= 1996–97 Bolton Wanderers F.C. season =

Bolton Wanderers
1996–97 season
- Chairman: Gordon Hargreaves
- Manager: Colin Todd
- Stadium: Burnden Park
- First Division: 1st (promoted)
- FA Cup: Fourth round
- League Cup: Quarter-final
- Top goalscorer: League: John McGinlay (24); All: John McGinlay (30)
- Highest home attendance: 22,030 v Charlton Athletic; 25 April 1997
- Lowest home attendance: 6,367 v Bristol City; 24 September 1996

The 1996–1997 season was the 118th season in Bolton Wanderers F.C.'s existence, and their first season back in the Football League First Division after relegation from the Premier League. It covers the period from 1 July 1996 to 30 June 1997. After 102 years, this was the club's last season at Burnden Park.

== Results ==
=== Nationwide League Division One ===
| Date | Opponents | H / A | Result F–A | Scorers | Attendance |
|---|---|---|---|---|---|
| 17 August 1996 | Port Vale | A | 1–1 | Thompson 23' | 10,057 |
| 20 August 1996 | Manchester City | H | 1–0 | Frandsen 49' | 18,257 |
| 24 August 1996 | Norwich City | H | 3–1 | Blake (2) 27', 77', Johansen 46' | 13,507 |
| 1 September 1996 | Queens Park Rangers | A | 2–1 | McGinlay 28', Thompson 90' | 11,225 |
| 7 September 1996 | Southend United | A | 2–5 | Blake 23', McGinlay 31' | 4,475 |
| 10 September 1996 | Grimsby Town | H | 6–1 | Johansen (2) 9', 80', Blake (2) 19', 54', Lee 78', Taylor 90' | 12,448 |
| 14 September 1996 | Portsmouth | H | 2–0 | Blake 49', Fairclough 86' | 14,248 |
| 21 September 1996 | Bradford City | A | 4–2 | Thompson 1', Blake (2) 20', 84', Frandsen 55' | 12,034 |
| 28 September 1996 | Stoke City | H | 1–1 | Blake 42' | 16,195 |
| 2 October 1996 | Wolverhampton Wanderers | A | 2–1 | McGinlay (2) 39', 86' | 26,540 |
| 12 October 1996 | Oldham Athletic | H | 3–1 | Johansen 7', McGinlay 20', 31' | 14,813 |
| 15 October 1996 | Tranmere Rovers | H | 1–0 | Sellars 51' | 14,136 |
| 19 October 1996 | Charlton Athletic | A | 3–3 | McGinlay (2) 23', 61'(pen), Blake 73' | 11,091 |
| 25 October 1996 | Barnsley | A | 2–2 | McGinlay 1'(pen), Thompson 49' | 9,413 |
| 29 October 1996 | Reading | H | 2–1 | Sellars 40', McGinlay 58' | 12,677 |
| 2 November 1996 | Huddersfield Town | H | 2–0 | Thompson 20', McGinlay 72' | 15,865 |
| 13 November 1996 | Birmingham City | A | 1–3 | Sheridan 75' | 17,033 |
| 16 November 1996 | Crystal Palace | H | 2–2 | Sheridan 11', McGinlay 21' (pen) | 16,892 |
| 19 November 1996 | Oxford United | A | 0–0 | | 7,517 |
| 22 November 1996 | Sheffield United | A | 1–1 | Blake 10' | 17,069 |
| 30 November 1996 | Barnsley | H | 2–2 | Blake 20', Thompson 88' | 16,852 |
| 8 December 1996 | West Bromwich Albion | A | 2–2 | Frandsen 37', Fairclough 62' | 13,082 |
| 14 December 1996 | Ipswich Town | H | 1–2 | Bergsson 70' | 13,314 |
| 22 December 1996 | Swindon Town | A | 2–2 | Green 58', McGinlay 84' | 8,948 |
| 26 December 1996 | Grimsby Town | A | 2–1 | Taggart 26', Blake 72' | 8,185 |
| 28 December 1996 | Southend United | H | 3–1 | Sellars (2) 30', 33', McGinlay 76' (pen) | 16,357 |
| 1 January 1997 | Bradford City | H | 2–0 | Lee 64', Sellars 84' | 16,192 |
| 11 January 1997 | Portsmouth | A | 3–0 | Blake (2) 55', 89', Johansen 74' | 10,467 |
| 18 January 1997 | Wolverhampton Wanderers | H | 3–0 | McGinlay 21', Curle 58'(og), Blake 62' | 18,980 |
| 29 January 1997 | Stoke City | A | 2–1 | Pollock 28', McGinlay 54' | 15,645 |
| 1 February 1997 | Birmingham City | H | 2–1 | Pollock 29', McGinlay 78'(pen) | 16,737 |
| 8 February 1997 | Reading | A | 2–3 | Thompson 61', McGinlay 64' | 10,739 |
| 15 February 1997 | Sheffield United | H | 2–2 | Paatelainen 4', Fairclough 20' | 17,922 |
| 22 February 1997 | Huddersfield Town | A | 2–1 | Fairclough 22', Taggart 47' | 16,061 |
| 2 March 1997 | West Bromwich Albion | H | 1–0 | Blake 34' | 13,258 |
| 4 March 1997 | Crystal Palace | A | 1–1 | Fairclough 90' | 16,035 |
| 8 March 1997 | Swindon Town | H | 7–0 | Thompson 30', Frandsen 36', Pollock 53', Bergsson (2) 82', 89'; McGinlay 85', Blake 87' | 13,981 |
| 15 March 1997 | Ipswich Town | A | 1–0 | McGinlay 26' | 16,187 |
| 18 March 1997 | Port Vale | H | 4–2 | Frandsen 9', Glover 38'(og), Fairclough 81', Blake 83' | 14,150 |
| 22 March 1997 | Norwich City | A | 1–0 | Sellars 24' | 17,585 |
| 5 April 1997 | Queens Park Rangers | H | 2–1 | Fairclough 44', McGinlay 49' | 19,198 |
| 9 April 1997 | Manchester City | A | 2–1 | Paatelainen 38', Sellars 58' | 28,026 |
| 12 April 1997 | Oxford United | H | 4–0 | Thompson (2) 32', 48', Sellars 40', Blake 61' | 15,994 |
| 19 April 1997 | Oldham Athletic | A | 0–0 | | 10,702 |
| 25 April 1997 | Charlton Athletic | H | 4–1 | Thompson 46', Taggart 65', McGinlay (2) 89'(pen), 90' | 21,880 |
| 4 May 1997 | Tranmere Rovers | A | 2–2 | McGinlay 27', Pollock 77' | 14,309 |

| Pos | Team | Pld | W | D | L | GF | GA | GD | Pts | Qualification or relegation |
|---|---|---|---|---|---|---|---|---|---|---|
| 1 | Bolton Wanderers (C, P) | 46 | 28 | 14 | 4 | 100 | 53 | +47 | 98 | Promotion to the Premier League |
| 2 | Barnsley (P) | 46 | 22 | 14 | 10 | 76 | 55 | +21 | 80 | Promotion to the Premier League |
| 3 | Wolverhampton Wanderers | 46 | 22 | 10 | 14 | 68 | 51 | +17 | 76 | Qualification for the First Division play-offs |
| 4 | Ipswich Town | 46 | 20 | 14 | 12 | 68 | 50 | +18 | 74 | Qualification for the First Division play-offs |
| 5 | Sheffield United | 46 | 20 | 13 | 13 | 75 | 52 | +23 | 73 | Qualification for the First Division play-offs |

Rules for classification: 1) Points; 2) Goals scored; 3) Goal difference
(C) Champions; (P) Promoted

=== F.A. Cup ===
| Date | Round | Opponents | H / A | Result F–A | Scorers | Attendance |
|---|---|---|---|---|---|---|
| 21 January 1997 | Round 3 | Luton Town | A | 1–1 | Pollock 26' | 7,414 |
| 25 January 1997 | Round 3 Replay | Luton Town | H | 6–2 | McGinlay 8', Blake 52', 66', Thompson 64', Pollock83', Green 90' | 9,713 |
| 4 February 1997 | Round 4 | Chesterfield | H | 2–3 | Taylor 14', Green 89' | 10,854 |

=== Coca-Cola Cup ===
| Date | Round | Opponents | H / A | Result F–A | Scorers | Attendance |
|---|---|---|---|---|---|---|
| 18 September 1996 | Round 2 First Leg | Bristol City | A | 0–0 | | 6,351 |
| 24 September 1996 | Round 2 Second Leg | Bristol City | H | 3–1 (aet); 3–1 (agg) | McGinlay 47', Blake 92', Thompson 107' | 6,367 |
| 22 October 1996 | Round 3 | Chelsea | H | 2–1 | McGinlay 22', Blake 43' | 16,867 |
| 27 November 1996 | Round 4 | Tottenham Hotspur | H | 6–1 | McGinlay 6, 37', 74' (pen), Taggart 60', Blake 79', Taylor 86' | 18,621 |
| 8 January 1997 | Round 5 | Wimbledon | H | 0–2 | | 16,968 |

== Transfers ==
=== Transfers in ===
| Player | From | Date | Fee |
|---|---|---|---|
| (Denmark) Michael Johansen | FC Copenhagen | 1 August 1996 | £1,250,000 |
| (Denmark) Per Frandsen | FC Copenhagen | 7 August 1996 | £1,250,000 |
| (England) Jamie Pollock | Middlesbrough | 15 November 1996 | £1,500,000 |
| (Republic of Ireland) John Sheridan | Sheffield Wednesday | 19 December 1996 | £180,000 |
| (England) Neil Cox | Middlesbrough | 21 May 1997 | £1,500,000 |

=== Transfers out ===
| Player | To | Date | Fee |
|---|---|---|---|
| (England) Mark Walton | Fulham | 1 August 1996 | Free |
| (Netherlands) Fabian de Freitas | CA Osasuna | 1 August 1996 | Free |
| (England) Alan Stubbs | Celtic | 1 August 1996 | £3,500,000 |
| (Federal Republic of Yugoslavia) Saša Ćurčić | Aston Villa | 23 August 1996 | £4,000,000 |
| (England) Wayne Burnett | Huddersfield Town | 20 September 1996 | £100,000 |
| (England) Mark Patterson | Sheffield United | 22 December 1996 | £300,000 |
| (Northern Ireland) Aidan Davison | Bradford City | 14 March 1997 | Free |

=== Loans in ===
| Player | From | Date From | Date To |
|---|---|---|---|
| (Republic of Ireland) John Sheridan | Sheffield Wednesday | 12 November 1996 | 18 December 1996 |

=== Loans out ===
| Player | To | Date From | Date To |
|---|---|---|---|
| (England) Stuart Whittaker | Wigan Athletic | 30 August 1996 | 10 September 1996 |
| (England) Wayne Burnett | Huddersfield Town | 6 September 1996 | 19 September 1996 |
| (Northern Ireland) Aidan Davison | Ipswich Town | 9 October 1996 | 9 November 1996 |
| (Northern Ireland) Aidan Davison | Hull City | 29 November 1996 | 25 January 1997 |

== Appearances ==
Bolton used a total of 22 players during the season.

| P | Player | Position | FL | FAC | LC | Total |
|---|---|---|---|---|---|---|
| 1 | (England) Chris Fairclough | Defender | 46 (0) | 3 (0) | 5 (0) | 54 (0) |
| 2= | (Wales) Nathan Blake | Striker | 42 (0) | 3 (0) | 5 (0) | 50 (0) |
| 2= | (Northern Ireland) Gerry Taggart | Defender | 43 (0) | 2 (0) | 5 (0) | 50 (0) |
| 4 | (Scotland) John McGinlay | Striker | 43 (0) | 1 (0) | 5 (0) | 49 (0) |
| 5 | (Denmark) Per Frandsen | Midfielder | 40 (1) | 2 (1) | 4 (1) | 46 (3) |
| 6 | (England) Scott Sellars | Midfielder | 40 (2) | 2 (0) | 3 (1) | 45 (3) |
| 7= | (Republic of Ireland) Keith Branagan | Goalkeeper | 36 (0) | 0 (0) | 4 (0) | 40 (0) |
| 7= | (England) Jimmy Phillips | Defender | 36 (0) | 0 (0) | 4 (0) | 40 (0) |
| 9 | (England) Alan Thompson | Midfielder | 34 (0) | 1 (1) | 4 (0) | 39 (1) |
| 10 | (Iceland) Guðni Bergsson | Defender | 30 (3) | 2 (0) | 3 (0) | 35 (3) |
| 11 | (Denmark) Michael Johansen | Midfielder | 24 (9) | 1 (1) | 3 (0) | 28 (10) |
| 12 | (England) Jamie Pollock | Midfielder | 18 (2) | 3 (0) | 0 (1) | 21(7) |
| 13 | (England) David Lee | Midfielder | 13 (12) | 0 (1) | 2 (1) | 24 (8) |
| 14 | (England) John Sheridan | Midfielder | 12 (7) | 2 (0) | 2 (0) | 16 (7) |
| 15= | (England) Bryan Small | Defender | 10 (1) | 3 (0) | 1 (0) | 14 (1) |
| 15= | (England) Gavin Ward | Goalkeeper | 10 (1) | 3 (0) | 1 (0) | 14 (1) |
| 17 | (England) Steve McAnespie | Defender | 11 (2) | 0 (0) | 1 (0) | 12 (2) |
| 18 | (England) Scott Green | Defender | 7 (5) | 1 (1) | 0 (0) | 8 (6) |
| 19 | (England) Andy Todd | Defender | 6 (9) | 0 (0) | 1 (2) | 7 (11) |
| 20 | (England) Scott Taylor | Striker | 2 (9) | 1 (0) | 0 (3) | 3 (12) |
| 21 | (England) Simon Coleman | Defender | 0 (0) | 1 (0) | 0 (0) | 1 (0) |
| 22 | (England) Wayne Burnett | Defender | 0 (1) | 0 (0) | 0 (0) | 0 (1) |

== Top scorers ==
| P | Player | Position | FL | FAC | LC | Total |
|---|---|---|---|---|---|---|
| 1 | (Scotland) John McGinlay | Striker | 24 | 1 | 5 | 30 |
| 2 | (Wales) Nathan Blake | Striker | 20 | 2 | 3 | 25 |
| 3 | (England) Alan Thompson | Midfielder | 11 | 1 | 1 | 13 |
| 3= | (England) Scott Sellars | Midfielder | 8 | 0 | 0 | 8 |
| 5 | (England) Chris Fairclough | Defender | 7 | 0 | 0 | 7 |
