= 1995–96 Bolton Wanderers F.C. season =

Bolton Wanderers F.C.
1995–96 season
- Chairman: Gordon Hargreaves
- Manager: Roy McFarland (until 2 January); Colin Todd (from 2 January)
- Stadium: Burnden Park
- FA Premier League: 20th
- FA Cup: Fourth round
- League Cup: Fourth round
- Top goalscorer: League: John McGinlay (6); All: John McGinlay (9)
- Highest home attendance: 21,381 (vs. Manchester United, 25 February 1996)
- Lowest home attendance: 5,247 (vs. Brentford, 19 September 1995)
- Average home league attendance: 18,822

The 1995–1996 season was the 117th season in Bolton Wanderers F.C.'s existence, and their first ever season in the FA Premier League following promotion from the Football League First Division.

This article covers the period from 1 July 1995 to 30 June 1996.

== Season summary ==
Bolton Wanderers returned to the top flight after a 15-year absence, only eight years after playing in the old Fourth Division, but with a new manager in Roy McFarland following Bruce Rioch's move to Arsenal. Bolton made a poor start to the campaign and McFarland made several moves in the transfer market, but this was not enough to turn things around and he was sacked on New Year's Day with Bolton bottom of the table and just two wins to their name. His assistant Colin Todd took over, and Bolton's form improved, but they could not avoid relegation. In spite of this, their form under Todd was so improved that, had the results from under Todd's management been shown all season, Bolton would have stayed up in 14th place.

== Squad ==
Squad at end of season

Note: Flags indicate national team as defined under FIFA eligibility rules; some limited exceptions apply. Players may hold more than one non-FIFA nationality.

No.	Pos.	Nation	Player
1	GK	ENG	Keith Branagan
2	DF	ENG	Scott Green
3	DF	ENG	Jimmy Phillips
4	MF	YUG	Saša Ćurčić
5	DF	ISL	Guðni Bergsson
6	DF	ENG	Alan Stubbs
7	MF	ENG	David Lee
9	FW	FIN	Mixu Paatelainen
10	FW	SCO	John McGinlay
11	MF	ENG	Alan Thompson
12	MF	ENG	Scott Sellars
13	GK	NIR	Aidan Davison
14	FW	NED	Fabian de Freitas
15	DF	ENG	Bryan Small
16	GK	ENG	Gavin Ward
17	DF	ENG	Simon Coleman

No.	Pos.	Nation	Player
18	DF	ENG	Nicky Spooner
19	MF	ENG	Stuart Whittaker
20	FW	WAL	Nathan Blake
21	DF	ENG	Chris Fairclough
22	DF	NIR	Gerry Taggart
23	DF	ENG	Andy Todd
24	DF	SCO	Steve McAnespie
25	FW	ENG	Scott Taylor
26	MF	ENG	Wayne Burnett
29	DF	ENG	Greg Strong
30	DF	ENG	Mark Powell
31	GK	ENG	Mark Westhead
32	DF	ENG	Neil Marsh
33	DF	ENG	Chris Gregory
34	MF	ENG	Matt Bowman

=== Left club during season ===
Note: Flags indicate national team as defined under FIFA eligibility rules; some limited exceptions apply. Players may hold more than one non-FIFA nationality.

No.	Pos.	Nation	Player
4	MF	IRL	Jason McAteer (to Liverpool)
8	MF	NED	Richard Sneekes (to West Bromwich Albion)
12	MF	ENG	Neil McDonald (to Preston North End)

No.	Pos.	Nation	Player
15	MF	ENG	Mark Patterson (to Sheffield United)
20	FW	IRL	Owen Coyle (to Dundee United)

== Results ==
=== FA Premier League ===
Date	Opponents	H / A	Result F – A	Scorers	Attendance
19 August 1995	Wimbledon	A	2 – 3	Thompson 27' (pen), de Freitas 39'	9,317
22 August 1995	Newcastle United	H	1 – 3	Bergsson	20,243
26 August 1995	Blackburn Rovers	H	2 – 1	de Freitas 21', Stubbs 80'	20,253
30 August 1995	Aston Villa	A	0 – 1		31,770
9 September 1995	Middlesbrough	H	1 – 1	McGinlay 21'	18,376
16 September 1995	Manchester United	A	0 – 3		32,812
23 September 1995	Liverpool	A	2 – 5	Todd 77', Patterson 81' (pen)	40,104
30 September 1995	Queens Park Rangers	H	0 – 1		17,362
14 October 1995	Everton	H	1 – 1	Paatelainen 1'	20,427
21 October 1995	Nottingham Forest	A	2 – 3	Sneekes 22', de Freitas 78'	25,426
30 October 1995	Arsenal	H	1 – 0	McGinlay 35'	18,682
4 November 1995	Manchester City	A	0 – 1		28,397
18 November 1995	West Ham United	H	0 – 3		19,047
22 November 1995	Chelsea	A	2 – 3	Ćurčić 10, Green 68'	17,495
25 November 1995	Southampton	A	0 – 1		14,404
2 December 1995	Nottingham Forest	H	1 – 1	de Freitas 67'	17,342
9 December 1995	Liverpool	H	0 – 1		21,042
16 December 1995	Queens Park Rangers	A	1 – 2	Sellars 43'	11,456
23 December 1995	Tottenham Hotspur	A	2 – 2	Green 77', Bergsson 79'	30,702
27 December 1995	Leeds United	H	0 – 2		18,414
30 December 1995	Coventry City	H	1 – 2	McGinlay 16'	16,678
1 January 1996	Sheffield Wednesday	A	2 – 4	Ćurčić 51', Taggart 77'	24,872
13 January 1996	Wimbledon	H	1 – 0	McGinlay 44' (pen)	16,216
20 January 1996	Newcastle United	A	1 – 2	Bergsson 19'	36,543
3 February 1996	Blackburn Rovers	A	1 – 3	Green 29'	30,419
10 February 1996	Aston Villa	H	0 – 2		18,099
17 February 1996	Middlesbrough	A	4 – 1	Blake 12', Coleman 45', de Freitas 62', Lee 73'	29,354
25 February 1996	Manchester United	H	0 – 6		21,381
2 March 1996	Leeds United	A	1 – 0	Bergsson	30,106
16 March 1996	Coventry City	A	2 – 0	Stubbs (2) 60', 70'	17,226
20 March 1996	Tottenham Hotspur	H	2 – 3	Stubbs 74', Sellars 84'	17,829
23 March 1996	Sheffield Wednesday	H	2 – 1	Sellars 52', Ćurčić 52'	18,368
30 March 1996	Manchester City	H	1 – 1	McGinlay 74'	21,050
6 April 1996	Everton	A	0 – 3		37,974
8 April 1996	Chelsea	H	2 – 1	McGinlay 40', Ćurčić 44'	18,021
13 April 1996	West Ham United	A	0 – 1		23,086
27 April 1996	Southampton	H	0 – 1		18,795
5 May 1996	Arsenal	A	1 – 2	Todd 76'	38,104

Pos	Team	Pld	W	D	L	GF	GA	GD	Pts	Qualification or relegation
16	Coventry City	38	8	14	16	42	60	−18	38	
17	Southampton	38	9	11	18	34	52	−18	38	
18	Manchester City (R)	38	9	11	18	33	58	−25	38	Relegation to Football League First Division
19	Queens Park Rangers (R)	38	9	6	23	38	57	−19	33	Relegation to Football League First Division
20	Bolton Wanderers (R)	38	8	5	25	39	71	−32	29	Relegation to Football League First Division

Source: Premier League
Rules for classification: 1) points; 2) goal difference; 3) number of goals scored.
(R) Relegated

=== FA Cup ===
Date	Round	Opponents	H / A	Result F – A	Scorers	Attendance
6 January 1996	Round 3	Bradford City	A	3 – 0	Ćurčić (2), McGinlay	10,265
14 February 1996	Round 4	Leeds United	H	0 – 1		16,694

=== Coca-Cola Cup ===
Date	Round	Opponents	H / A	Result F – A	Scorers	Attendance
19 September 1995	Round 2 First Leg	Brentford	H	1 – 0	Sneekes	5,243
3 October 1995	Round 2 Second Leg	Brentford	A	3 – 2; 4 – 2 (agg)	McGinlay, Patterson, Thompson	4,861
24 October 1995	Round 3	Leicester City	H	0 – 0		9,166
8 November 1995	Round 3 replay	Leicester City	A	3 – 2	Ćurčić, McGinlay, Sneekes	14,884
29 November 1995	Round 4	Norwich City	A	0 – 0		13,820
20 December 1995	Round 4 replay	Norwich City	H	0 – 0 (aet); 2 – 3 (pens)		8,736

== Top scorers ==
P	Player	Position	PL	FAC	LC	Total
1	(Scotland) John McGinlay	Striker	6	2	1	9
2	(Federal Republic of Yugoslavia) Saša Ćurčić	Midfielder	4	1	2	7
3	(Netherlands) Fabian de Freitas	Striker	5	0	0	5
4=	(Iceland) Guðni Bergsson	Defender	4	0	0	4
4=	(England) Alan Stubbs	Defender	4	0	0	4
