= 1997–98 Bolton Wanderers F.C. season =

Bolton Wanderers F.C.
1997–98 season
- Chairman: Gordon Hargreaves
- Manager: Colin Todd
- Stadium: Reebok Stadium
- FA Premier League: 18th (relegated)
- FA Cup: Third Round
- League Cup: Fourth Round
- Top goalscorer: League: Nathan Blake (12); All: Nathan Blake (14)
- Highest home attendance: 25,000, multiple occasions
- Lowest home attendance: 6,444 v Leyton Orient, 30 September 1997
- Average home league attendance: 24,352

The 1997–98 season was the 119th season in Bolton Wanderers F.C.'s existence, and their first season back in the FA Premier League after winning the Football League First Division the previous season. It covers the period from 1 July 1997 to 30 June 1998. After 102 years playing at Burnden Park, the club had moved to the new Reebok Stadium.

== Season summary ==
In their new 27,000-seat stadium, Bolton Wanderers began the season as the strongest-looking of the newly promoted side, particularly after paying a club record fee of £3.5 million for Wimbledon striker Dean Holdsworth and holding Manchester United to a 0–0 draw. But it was a season-long struggle for Colin Todd and his men, who lost their battle on the final day of the season and occupied the final relegation place – on goal difference – to complete a hat-trick of newly promoted clubs suffering relegation. Controversially Bolton had a goal against Everton disallowed in the belief that the ball had not crossed the line after crashing down off the Everton crossbar. Television replays showed the ball had indeed crossed the line. The game finished goal-less and the two sides finished level on points with Everton surviving on their superior goal difference. Bolton fans complained bitterly that the goal and resulting 1–0 win would have kept them in the FA Premier League at Everton's expense. Everton fans countered by pointing to Bolton's inability to hold onto a lead during the season while Everton had a good record of coming from behind to draw or even win against their fellow strugglers.

== Final league table ==
Pos	Team	Pld	W	D	L	GF	GA	GD	Pts	Qualification or relegation
16	Sheffield Wednesday	38	12	8	18	52	67	−15	44	
17	Everton	38	9	13	16	41	56	−15	40	
18	Bolton Wanderers (R)	38	9	13	16	41	61	−20	40	Relegation to the Football League First Division
19	Barnsley (R)	38	10	5	23	37	82	−45	35	Relegation to the Football League First Division
20	Crystal Palace (Note: Crystal Palace qualified for the 1998 Intertoto Cup as they were the only English team who applied.) (R)	38	8	9	21	37	71	−34	33	Intertoto Cup third round and relegation to the First Division

Source: Premier League
Rules for classification: 1) points; 2) goal difference; 3) number of goals scored.
(R) Relegated
Notes:

Results summary

Overall								Home						Away					
Pld	W	D	L	GF	GA	GD	Pts	W	D	L	GF	GA	GD	W	D	L	GF	GA	GD
38	9	13	16	41	61	−20	40	7	8	4	25	22	+3	2	5	12	16	39	−23

Source: 1997-98 FA Premier League table

Results by round

Round	1	2	3	4	5	6	7	8	9	10	11	12	13	14	15	16	17	18	19	20	21	22	23	24	25	26	27	28	29	30	31	32	33	34	35	36	37	38
Ground	A	A	A	H	A	H	H	A	H	A	H	H	A	A	H	H	A	H	A	H	A	H	A	H	A	H	A	A	H	H	H	A	H	A	H	A	H	A
Result	W	D	L	D	L	D	D	D	L	L	W	D	L	D	W	W	L	D	L	D	L	D	L	L	D	D	L	L	W	W	L	D	W	L	L	W	W	L
Position	5	8	13	12	16	16	16	17	17	18	17	17	18	18	18	13	14	16	17	16	17	18	19	19	19	18	19	19	19	19	19	18	18	18	19	18	17	18

Source: 11v11.com: 1997-98 Bolton Wanderers results
A = Away; H = Home; W = Win; D = Draw; L = Loss

== Results ==
=== FA Premier League ===
Date	Opponents	H / A	Result F – A	Scorers	Attendance
9 August 1997	Southampton	A	1 – 0	Blake 43'	15,206
23 August 1997	Coventry City	A	2 – 2	Blake (2) 69', 76'	16,633
27 August 1997	Barnsley	A	1 – 2	Beardsley 31'	18,661
1 September 1997	Everton	H	0 – 0		23,131
13 September 1997	Arsenal	A	1 – 4	Thompson 13'	38,138
20 September 1997	Manchester United	H	0 – 0		25,000
23 September 1997	Tottenham Hotspur	H	1 – 1	Thompson 20' (pen)	23,433
27 September 1997	Crystal Palace	A	2 – 2	Beardsley 36', Johansen 66'	17,134
4 October 1997	Aston Villa	H	0 – 1		24,186
18 October 1997	West Ham United	A	0 – 3		24,864
26 October 1997	Chelsea	H	1 – 0	Holdsworth 72'	24,080
1 November 1997	Liverpool	H	1 – 1	Blake 84'	25,000
8 November 1997	Sheffield Wednesday	A	0 – 5		25,027
22 November 1997	Leicester City	A	0 – 0		20,464
29 November 1997	Wimbledon	H	1 – 0	Blake 89'	22,703
1 December 1997	Newcastle United	H	1 – 0	Blake 22'	24,494
6 December 1997	Blackburn Rovers	A	1 – 3	Frandsen 84'	25,503
14 December 1997	Derby County	H	3 – 3	Thompson 50' (pen), Blake 73', Pollock 77'	23, 037
20 December 1997	Leeds United	A	0 – 2		31,163
26 December 1997	Barnsley	H	1 – 1	Bergsson 38'	25,000
28 December 1997	Everton	A	2 – 3	Bergsson 42', Sellars 43'	37,149
10 January 1998	Southampton	H	0 – 0		23,333
17 January 1998	Newcastle United	A	1 – 2	Blake 72'	36,767
31 January 1998	Coventry City	H	1 – 5	Sellars 21'	25,000
7 February 1998	Manchester United	A	1 – 1	B.Taylor 60'	55,156
21 February 1998	West Ham United	H	1 – 1	Blake 86'	25,000
1 March 1998	Tottenham Hotspur	A	0 – 1		29,032
8 March 1998	Liverpool	A	1 – 2	Thompson 7'	44,532
14 March 1998	Sheffield Wednesday	H	3 – 2	Frandsen 31', Blake 53', Thompson 69' (pen)	24,847
28 March 1998	Leicester City	H	2 – 0	Thompson (2) 52', 89'	25,000
31 March 1998	Arsenal	H	0 – 1		25,000
4 April 1998	Wimbledon	A	0 – 0		11,356
11 April 1998	Blackburn Rovers	H	2 – 1	Holdsworth 20', B. Taylor 67'	25,000
13 April 1998	Derby County	A	0 – 4		29,126
18 April 1998	Leeds United	H	2 – 3	Thompson 56', Fish 89'	25,000
25 April 1998	Aston Villa	A	3 – 1	Cox 18', B.Taylor 41', Blake 84'	38,392
2 May 1998	Crystal Palace	H	5 – 2	Blake 7', Fish 20', Phillips 30', Thompson 70', Holdsworth 79'	24,449
10 May 1998	Chelsea	A	0 – 2		34,845

=== FA Cup ===
Date	Round	Opponents	H / A	Result F – A	Scorers	Attendance
3 January 1998	Round 3	Barnsley	A	0 – 1		15,042

=== Coca-Cola Cup ===
Date	Round	Opponents	H / A	Result F – A	Scorers	Attendance
16 September 1997	Round 2 First Leg	Leyton Orient	A	3 – 1	Todd 13', Frandsen 20', McGinlay 79'	4,128
30 September 1997	Round 2 Second Leg	Leyton Orient	H	4 – 4 (aet); 7 – 5 (agg)	Blake (2) 8' 35', McGinlay 65' (pen), Gunnlaugsson 66'	6,444
14 October 1997	Round 3	Wimbledon	H	2 – 0 (aet)	Pollock 91', McAllister 94' (og)	9,875
18 November 1997	Round 4	Middlesbrough	A	1 – 2 (aet)	Thompson 33'	22,801

== Transfers ==
=== Transfers in ===
Player	From	Date	Fee
(England) Robbie Elliott	(England) Newcastle United	1 July 1997	£2,500,000
(Iceland) Arnar Gunnlaugsson	(Iceland) IA Akranes	10 July 1997	£100,000
(England) Peter Beardsley	(England) Newcastle United	18 August 1997	£450,000
(South Africa) Mark Fish	(Italy) Lazio	19 September 1997	£2,000,000
(England) Mike Whitlow	(England) Leicester City	19 September 1997	£500,000
(England) Dean Holdsworth	(England) Wimbledon	2 October 1997	£3,500,000
(Finland) Jussi Jääskeläinen	(Finland) VPS Vaasa	11 November 1997	£100,000

=== Transfers out ===
Player	To	Date	Fee
(England) Scott Green	(England) Wigan Athletic	1 July 1997	£300,000
(England) David Lee	(England) Wigan Athletic	14 July 1997	£250,000
(Finland) Mixu Paatelainen	(England) Wolverhampton Wanderers	8 August 1997	£200,000
(Scotland) John McGinlay	(England) Bradford City	6 November 1997	£625,000
(Scotland) Steve McAnespie	(England) Fulham	27 November 1997	£100,000
(England) Simon Coleman	(England) Southend	20 February 1998	Free
(England) Jamie Pollock	(England) Manchester City	20 March 1998	£1,000,000
(England) Alan Thompson	(England) Aston Villa	5 June 1998	£4,500,000

=== Loans in ===
Player	From	Date From	Date To
(England) Franz Carr	(Italy) Reggiana	24 October 1997	28 January 1998
(England) Bob Taylor	(England) West Bromwich Albion	9 January 1998	9 February 1998
(Switzerland) Gaetano Giallanza	(France) Nantes	26 March 1998	31 May 1998
(England) John Salako	(England) Coventry City	26 March 1998	31 May 1998
(England) Bob Taylor	(England) West Bromwich Albion	26 March 1998	31 May 1998

=== Loans out ===
Player	To	Date From	Date To
(England) Simon Coleman	(England) Wolverhampton Wanderers	2 September 1997	2 October 1997
(England) Bryan Small	(England) Luton Town	8 September 1997	12 December 1997
(England) Greg Strong	(England) Blackpool	21 November 1997	10 February 1998
(England) Scott Taylor	(England) Rotherham United	12 December 1997	7 February 1998
(England) Bryan Small	(England) Bradford City	19 December 1997	17 January 1998
(England) Bryan Small	(England) Bury	30 January 1998	31 May 1998
(England) Peter Beardsley	(England) Manchester City	17 February 1998	11 March 1998
(England) Peter Beardsley	(England) Fulham	26 March 1998	31 May 1998
(England) Scott Taylor	(England) Blackpool	26 March 1998	26 April 1998

== Appearances ==
Bolton used a total of 29 players during the season.

P	Player	Position	PL	FAC	LC	Total
1	(Denmark) Per Frandsen	Midfielder	38 (0)	1 (0)	4 (0)	43 (0)
2	(Wales) Nathan Blake	Striker	35 (0)	1 (0)	3 (0)	39 (0)
3	(Iceland) Guðni Bergsson (captain)	Defender	34 (1)	1 (0)	3 (0)	38 (1)
4	(England) Alan Thompson	Midfielder	33 (0)	1 (0)	4 (0)	38 (0)
5	(Republic of Ireland) Keith Branagan	Goalkeeper	34 (0)	0 (0)	3 (0)	37 (0)
6	(England) Jamie Pollock	Midfielder	25 (1)	1 (0)	4 (0)	30 (1)
7	(England) Andy Todd	Defender	23 (2)	1 (0)	4 (0)	28 (2)
8	(England) Scott Sellars	Midfielder	22 (0)	1 (0)	3 (0)	26 (0)
9	(South Africa) Mark Fish	Defender	22 (0)	1 (0)	1 (0)	24 (0)
10	(England) Jimmy Phillips	Defender	21 (1)	0 (0)	1 (1)	22 (2)
11	(England) Neil Cox	Defender	20 (1)	0 (1)	0 (0)	20(2)
12	(England) Peter Beardsley	Striker	14 (3)	0 (1)	3 (0)	17 (4)
13	(England) Dean Holdsworth	Striker	17 (3)	0 (0)	0 (0)	17 (3)
14	(England) Mike Whitlow	Defender	13 (0)	1 (0)	3 (0)	16 (0)
15	(Northern Ireland) Gerry Taggart	Defender	14 (1)	0 (0)	1 (0)	15 (1)
16	(England) John Sheridan	Midfielder	12 (0)	0 (0)	0 (0)	12 (0)
17	(England) Bob Taylor	Striker	10 (2)	0 (0)	0 (0)	10 (2)
18	(England) Chris Fairclough	Striker	10 (1)	0 (0)	0 (0)	10 (1)
19	(Scotland) John McGinlay	Striker	4 (3)	0 (0)	2 (1)	6 (4)
20	(England) Gavin Ward	Goalkeeper	4 (2)	1 (0)	1 (0)	6 (2)
21	(Denmark) Michael Johansen	Midfielder	4 (12)	0 (0)	1 (2)	5 (14)
22	(England) Robbie Elliott	Defender	4 (0)	0 (0)	0 (0)	4 (0)
23	(Iceland) Arnar Gunnlaugsson	Striker	2 (13)	1 (0)	0 (3)	3 (16)
24	(Scotland) Steve McAnespie	Defender	1 (1)	0 (0)	2 (0)	3 (1)
25	(England) Hasney Aljofree	Defender	2 (0)	0 (0)	0 (0)	2 (0)
26	(England) Greg Strong	Defender	0 (0)	0 (0)	1 (1)	1 (1)
27	(England) John Salako	Midfielder	0 (7)	0 (0)	0 (0)	0 (7)
28	(England) Franz Carr	Midfielder	0 (5)	0 (0)	0 (0)	0 (5)
29	(Switzerland) Gaetano Giallanza	Striker	0 (3)	0 (0)	0 (0)	0 (3)

== Top scorers ==
P	Player	Position	PL	FAC	LC	Total
1	(Wales) Nathan Blake	Striker	12	0	2	14
2	(England) Alan Thompson	Midfielder	9	0	1	10
3=	(Denmark) Per Frandsen	Midfielder	2	0	1	3
3=	(England) Dean Holdsworth	Striker	3	0	0	3
3=	(England) Bob Taylor	Striker	3	0	0	3
