= 1994–95 Bolton Wanderers F.C. season =

Bolton Wanderers
1994–95 season
- Chairman: Gordon Hargreaves
- Manager: Bruce Rioch (until 8 June 1995); Roy McFarland (from 20 June 1995)
- Stadium: Burnden Park
- First Division: 3rd
- FA Cup: 3rd Round
- Coca-Cola Cup: Runners Up
- Top goalscorer: League: John McGinlay (16); All: John McGinlay (22)
- Highest home attendance: 20,041 v Wolverhampton Wanderers; 17 May 1995
- Lowest home attendance: 8,212 v Ipswich Town; 5 October 1994

The 1994–1995 season was the 116th season in Bolton Wanderers F.C.'s existence, and their second successive season in the Football League First Division. It covers the period from 1 July 1994 to 30 June 1995.

== Results ==
=== Football League First Division ===
Date	Opponents	H / A	Result F–A	Scorers	Attendance
13 August 1994	Grimsby Town	A	3–3	Paatelainen (2), McGinlay (pen)	8,393
20 August 1994	Bristol City	H	0–2		12,127
27 August 1994	Middlesbrough	A	0–1		19,570
30 August 1994	Millwall	H	1–0	Patterson	9,519
3 September 1994	Stoke City	H	4–0	McGinlay, McAteer (2), Paatelainen	11,515
10 September 1994	Sheffield United	A	1–3	McGinlay	14,116
13 September 1994	Luton Town	A	3–0	McGinlay (2), Sneekes	5,764
17 September 1994	Portsmouth	H	1–1	McGinlay	11,284
24 September 1994	Southend United	A	1–2	Sneekes	4,507
1 October 1994	Derby County	H	1–0	McGinlay	12,015
8 October 1994	Burnley	A	2–2	McGinlay, Coleman	16,687
16 October 1994	Oldham Athletic	H	2–2	Paatelainen, Lee	11,106
22 October 1994	Port Vale	A	1–1	Green	10,003
29 October 1994	Watford	H	3–0	Paatelainen, McGinlay (2) (1pen)	10,483
1 November 1994	Swindon Town	H	3–0	Coleman, Thompson, de Freitas	10,046
5 November 1994	Charlton Athletic	A	2–1	Sneekes (2)	9,793
19 November 1994	Notts County	H	2–0	de Freitas, Paatelainen	11,698
23 November 1994	Wolverhampton Wanderers	A	1–3	Paatelainen	25,903
26 November 1994	Barnsley	A	0–3		8,507
6 December 1994	Port Vale	H	1–0	Patterson	10,324
10 December 1994	Bristol City	A	1–0	Patterson	6,144
17 December 1994	Grimsby Town	H	3–3	Coyle (2), Lee	10,522
26 December 1994	Sunderland	A	1–1	Paatelainen	19,758
27 December 1994	Tranmere Rovers	H	1–0	Thompson	16,782
31 December 1994	West Bromwich Albion	A	0–1		18,184
2 January 1995	Reading	H	1–0	Coleman	14,705
14 January 1995	Watford	A	0–0		9,113
21 January 1995	Charlton Athletic	H	5–1	McGinlay (2), McAteer, Coyle, Paatenlainen	10,516
4 February 1995	Wolverhampton Wanderers	H	5–1	Sneekes, Coleman, Phillips, Coyle, Thompson	16,964
7 February 1995	Notts County	A	1–1	Coyle	7,553
18 February 1995	Barnsley	H	2–1	Thompson, Sneekes	12,463
26 February 1995	Derby County	A	1–2	McAteer	11,003
4 March 1995	Southend United	H	3–0	Thompson, Lee, McAteer	10,766
11 March 1995	Middlesbrough	H	1–0	Paatelainen	18,370
19 March 1995	Millwall	A	1–0	McGinlay	6,103
22 March 1995	Sheffield United	H	1–1	Stubbs	16,756
25 March 1995	Portsmouth	A	1–1	Paatelainen	7,756
5 April 1995	Swindon Town	A	1–0	Thompson	8,100
8 April 1995	West Bromwich Albion	A	1–0	Thompson (pen)	16,207
11 April 1995	Luton Town	H	0–0		13,619
14 April 1995	Tranmere Rovers	A	0–1		15,595
17 April 1995	Sunderland	H	1–0	McGinlay	15,030
21 April 1995	Reading	A	1–2	Lee	13,223
29 April 1995	Oldham Athletic	A	1–3	McGinlay	11,901
3 May 1995	Stoke City	A	1–1	McGinlay	15,507
7 May 1995	Burnley	H	1–1	Paatelainen	16,853

Pos	Team	Pld	W	D	L	GF	GA	GD	Pts	Qualification or relegation
1	Middlesbrough (C, P)	46	23	13	10	67	40	+27	82	Promotion to the Premier League
2	Reading	46	23	10	13	58	44	+14	79	Qualification for the First Division play-offs
3	Bolton Wanderers (O, P)	46	21	14	11	67	45	+22	77	Qualification for the First Division play-offs
4	Wolverhampton Wanderers	46	21	13	12	77	61	+16	76	Qualification for the First Division play-offs
5	Tranmere Rovers	46	22	10	14	67	58	+9	76	Qualification for the First Division play-offs

Rules for classification: 1) Points; 2) Goals scored; 3) Goal difference
(C) Champions; (O) Play-off winners; (P) Promoted

=== Football League First Division play-offs ===
Date	Round	Opponents	H / A	Result F–A	Scorers	Attendance
14 May 1995	Semi Final First Leg	Wolverhampton Wanderers	A	1–2	McAteer	26,153
17 May 1995	Semi Final Second Leg	Wolverhampton Wanderers	H	2–0 (a.e.t.); 3–2 (agg)	McGinlay (2)	20,041
29 May 1995	Final	Reading	Wembley Stadium	4–3 (a.e.t.)	Coyle, de Freitas (2), Paatelainen	64,107

=== F.A. Cup ===
Date	Round	Opponents	H / A	Result F–A	Scorers	Attendance
7 January 1995	Round 3	Portsmouth	A	1–3	Sneekes	9,721

=== Coca-Cola Cup ===
Date	Round	Opponents	H / A	Result F–A	Scorers	Attendance
21 September 1994	Round 2 First Leg	Ipswich Town	A	3–0	McAteer, McGinlay, Thompson	7,787
5 October 1994	Round 2 Second Leg	Ipswich Town	H	1–0; 4–0 (agg)	Sneekes	8,212
25 October 1994	Round 3	Sheffield United	A	2–1	Paatelainen, Scott (og)	6,939
30 November 1994	Round 4	West Ham United	A	3–1	McGinlay (2) (1pen), Lee	18,190
11 January 1995	Round 5	Norwich City	H	1–0	Lee	17,029
12 February 1995	Semi Final First Leg	Swindon Town	A	1–2	Stubbs 10'	15,341
8 March 1995	Semi Final Second Leg	Swindon Town	H	3–1; 4–3 (agg)	McAteer 64', Paatelainen 71', McGinlay 88'	19,851
2 April 1995	Final	Liverpool	Wembley Stadium	1–2	Thompson 69'	75,595

== Top scorers ==
P	Player	Position	FL	FAC	LC	Total
1	(Scotland) John McGinlay	Striker	16	0	4	20
2	(Finland) Mixu Paatelainen	Striker	12	0	2	14
3	(England) Alan Thompson	Midfielder	7	0	2	9
4=	(Republic of Ireland) Jason McAteer	Midfielder	5	0	2	7
4=	(Netherlands) Richard Sneekes	Striker	6	1	1	8
