= Alan Thompson (footballer, born 1973) =

English footballer (born 1973)

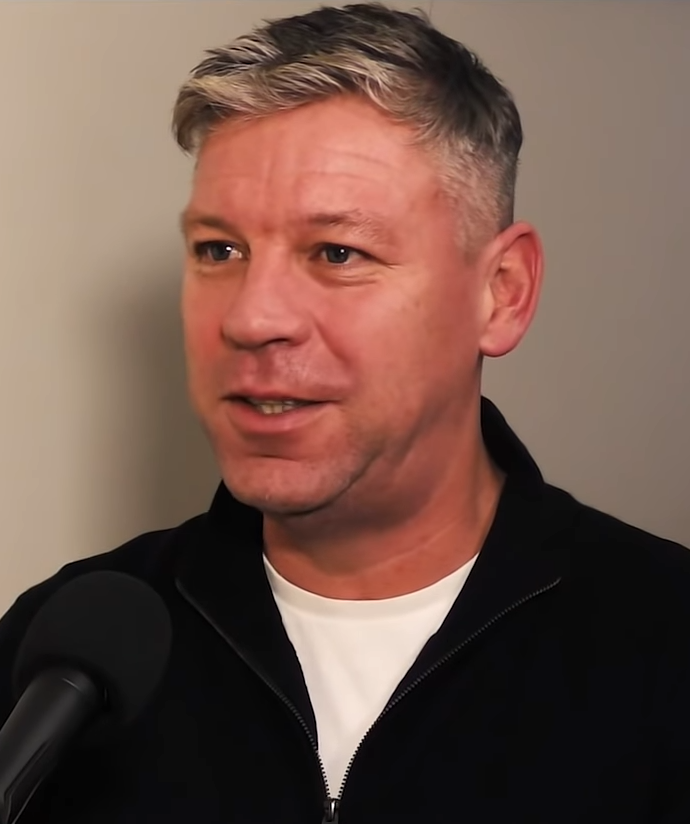
- Thompson in 2022

Personal information
- Full name: Alan Thompson
- Date of birth: 22 December 1973 (age 52)
- Place of birth: Newcastle upon Tyne, England
- Height: 6 ft 0 in (1.83 m)
- Position: Midfielder

Youth career
- 1989–1991: Newcastle United

Senior career*
| Years | Team | Apps | (Gls) |
| 1991–1993 | Newcastle United | 16 | (0) |
| 1993–1998 | Bolton Wanderers | 157 | (34) |
| 1998–2000 | Aston Villa | 46 | (4) |
| 2000–2007 | Celtic | 158 | (37) |
| 2007 | → Leeds United (loan) | 11 | (2) |
| 2007–2008 | Leeds United | 13 | (3) |
| 2008 | → Hartlepool United (loan) | 7 | (1) |
| Total | | 408 | (81) |

International career
| 1991–1992 | England U18 | 4 | (1) |
| 1992–1993 | England U19 | 9 | (2) |
| 1995 | England U21 | 2 | (0) |
| 2004 | England | 1 | (0) |
Medal record
England
FIFA Under-19 World Cup
| Bronze medal – third place | 1993 Australia |
- * Club domestic league appearances and goals

Alan Thompson (born 22 December 1973) is an English football coach and former professional footballer.

As a player he was a midfielder who notably played in the Premier League for Bolton Wanderers and Aston Villa and in the Scottish Premiership with Celtic. He also played in the Football League with Newcastle United, Leeds United and Hartlepool United He made 550 appearances during his career and was capped by England once against Sweden in 2004.

Following retirement, Thompson has worked as a coach for Newcastle United, Celtic, Birmingham City and Blackpool. He also had a brief spell as assistant manager of Bury but was dismissed with Lee Clark in October 2017.

== Club career ==
Thompson was born in Newcastle upon Tyne, Tyne and Wear. He began his career at his hometown club Newcastle United, progressing through their youth system before signing a professional contract on 11 March 1991.

Thompson's contract expired in summer 1993, and after rejecting the offer of a new contract with Newcastle, he signed for Bolton Wanderers in July 1993, with the two clubs later agreeing a £250,000 compensation fee for the transfer. He scored for Bolton with a spectacular shot from just inside the opponent's box at Wembley in the 1995 League Cup Final in a 2–1 defeat to Liverpool. Thompson was integral to the Bolton Wanderers team that gained promotion to the Premier League via the play-offs in 1995. After Bolton were relegated in their inaugural Premier League season, he helped them to return as First Division Champions in 1997, the club's final season at Burnden Park.

He also scored the first ever competitive goal at the Reebok Stadium in a match against Tottenham Hotspur. Two years earlier, he had been the scorer of their first ever Premier League goal on the opening day of the 1995–96 season in a 3–2 defeat to Wimbledon at Selhurst Park.

Thompson moved to Aston Villa in June 1998 for a £4.5 million fee, agreeing a five-year contract with the club.

Thompson moved to Celtic in 2000 for £2.75 million during manager Martin O'Neill's first season at the club. He was an integral part of the Celtic team that reached the 2003 UEFA Cup Final where Celtic lost 3–2 in extra time to Porto.

Thompson scored the only goal in the 2005 Scottish Cup Final for Celtic against Dundee United to give the outgoing O'Neill his seventh trophy whilst in charge of the club. He also scored the winning goal against Rangers in two separate Old Firm derby matches and seven against Rangers in all. He had mixed fortunes in Old Firm matches, however, being sent off three times, all at Ibrox Stadium. Thompson scored a spectacular goal in the dying minutes as Celtic beat Rangers in the first Old Firm match of 2004–05, in turn securing Celtic's seventh consecutive win over their Glasgow rivals. Thompson scored several important goals in European competition for Celtic as well; including the opening goal in Celtic's 2–0 win over Liverpool at Anfield in March 2003 during Celtic's run to the UEFA Cup Final, and he scored against Barcelona at Parkhead in a 1–0 win a year later to help Celtic reach the quarter-finals of the same tournament.

Under Celtic manager Gordon Strachan, Thompson fell out of favour and found first team opportunities very limited, often not even securing a place on the substitutes' bench.

On 12 January 2007, Thompson secured a loan move to Championship club Leeds United until the end of 2006–07 in a bid to play first-team football. He made his debut for Leeds against West Bromwich Albion on 20 January and scored in a 3–2 defeat. In his next appearance, he scored a trademark free kick; the winning goal against Hull City in a 2–1 victory. Thompson left Leeds at the end of the 2006–07 season after his loan period and Celtic contract ended. His agent commented "He was very happy at Leeds, and there's a chance he could go back there.".

Thompson signed a one-year contract with Leeds on 9 August 2007. He was made club captain for 2007–08, their first in League One He scored from a free kick against Southend United in the first home league match of the season.

Thompson was made acting assistant manager after the departure of Gus Poyet, but returned to his playing role upon the arrival of Dave Bassett. In January 2008, he joined another League One club, Hartlepool United, on a one-month loan deal, scoring once against Luton Town. He spent a spell out of the team injured, before returning to feature in the squad for Leeds' play-off campaign, although he did not play. He retired at the end of the season, at the age of 34.

Thompson ended his playing career on 28 May 2008 after 17 years as a professional. He said: "I've had a good career but I've decided to call it a day. I'll take a bit of time out but I'd like to stay in the match. The high point was playing for England against Sweden in 2004 but I've got plenty of good memories."

== International career ==
Thompson played for England U18s at the UEFA U18 Euros in 1992. England finished fourth. Thompson then played every match for England U19 at the FIFA U19 World Cup in 1993. England won the bronze medal.

Thompson was also capped by England at under-21 and B levels, before earning one cap for the senior team, when he was picked by Sven-Göran Eriksson for a friendly against Sweden in 2004. As a result, he became the first Celtic player to have won an England international cap whilst playing his club football for the Glasgow club.

== Coaching career ==
On 16 July 2008, Thompson was appointed new academy coach at Newcastle United. It was his former boss Kevin Keegan that handed him the role of looking after the club's young talents. He was the club's reserve-team coach for the 2009–10 season. On 4 June 2010, Thompson left Newcastle by mutual consent and on 17 June 2010 he was announced as the new first-team coach at Celtic, working under his former teammate Neil Lennon. Thompson was dismissed from his role at Celtic on 3 June 2012.

He was appointed development squad coach at Championship club Birmingham City in June 2014, but when manager Lee Clark and assistant Steve Watson were dismissed in October, Thompson left the club by mutual consent a few days later.

After a spell as first-team coach with Clark during his time at Blackpool, the pair re-united again in February 2017 with Thompson becoming Clark's assistant at Bury. On 30 October 2017, Thompson was dismissed as assistant manager at Bury.

== Personal life ==
Thompson's cousin David Longstaff is a former British international ice hockey player, whose sons Sean and Matty are footballers developed at Newcastle United.

== Career statistics ==
=== Club ===
Appearances and goals by club, season and competition
| Club | Season | League | | | National cup (Note: Includes FA Cup, Scottish Cup) | | League cup (Note: Includes Football League Cup, Scottish League Cup) | | Europe | | Other | | Total | |
| Club | Season | Division | Apps | Goals | Apps | Goals | Apps | Goals | Apps | Goals | Apps | Goals | Apps | Goals |
|---|---|---|---|---|---|---|---|---|---|---|---|---|---|---|
| Newcastle United | 1991–92 | Second Division | 14 | 0 | 1 | 0 | 0 | 0 | — | | — | | 15 | 0 |
| Newcastle United | 1992–93 | First Division | 2 | 0 | 0 | 0 | 0 | 0 | — | | 3 (Note: Appearances in Anglo-Italian Cup) | 0 | 5 | 0 |
| Newcastle United | Total | | 16 | 0 | 1 | 0 | 0 | 0 | — | | 3 | 0 | 20 | 0 |
| Bolton Wanderers | 1993–94 | First Division | 27 | 6 | 3 | 1 | 4 | 0 | — | | 5 | 1 | 39 | 8 |
| Bolton Wanderers | 1994–95 | First Division | 37 | 7 | 1 | 0 | 8 | 2 | — | | 3 (Note: Appearances in First Division play-offs) | 0 | 49 | 9 |
| Bolton Wanderers | 1995–96 | Premier League | 26 | 1 | 1 | 0 | 5 | 1 | — | | — | | 32 | 2 |
| Bolton Wanderers | 1996–97 | First Division | 34 | 11 | 2 | 1 | 4 | 1 | — | | — | | 40 | 13 |
| Bolton Wanderers | 1997–98 | Premier League | 33 | 9 | 1 | 0 | 4 | 1 | — | | — | | 38 | 10 |
| Bolton Wanderers | Total | | 157 | 34 | 8 | 2 | 25 | 5 | — | | 8 | 1 | 198 | 42 |
| Aston Villa | 1998–99 | Premier League | 25 | 2 | 0 | 0 | 1 | 0 | 3 (Note: Appearances in UEFA Cup) | 0 | — | | 29 | 2 |
| Aston Villa | 1999–2000 | Premier League | 21 | 2 | 1 | 0 | 5 | 1 | — | | — | | 27 | 3 |
| Aston Villa | 2000–01 | Premier League | 0 | 0 | — | | — | | 2 (Note: Appearances in UEFA Intertoto Cup) | 0 | — | | 2 | 0 |
| Aston Villa | Total | | 46 | 4 | 1 | 0 | 6 | 1 | 5 | 0 | — | | 58 | 5 |
| Celtic | 2000–01 | Scottish Premier League | 30 | 3 | 6 | 0 | 3 | 1 | — | | — | | 39 | 4 |
| Celtic | 2001–02 | Scottish Premier League | 25 | 6 | 4 | 2 | 1 | 0 | 6 (Note: Five appearances and one goal in UEFA Champions League, one appearance in UEFA Cup) | 1 | — | | 36 | 9 |
| Celtic | 2002–03 | Scottish Premier League | 29 | 8 | 1 | 0 | 3 | 1 | 12 | 3 | — | | 45 | 12 |
| Celtic | 2003–04 | Scottish Premier League | 26 | 11 | 4 | 0 | 1 | 0 | 13 (Note: Eight appearances and one goal in UEFA Champions League, five appearances in UEFA Cup) | 2 | — | | 44 | 13 |
| Celtic | 2004–05 | Scottish Premier League | 32 | 7 | 5 | 2 | 2 | 0 | 5 (Note: Appearances in UEFA Champions League) | 1 | — | | 44 | 10 |
| Celtic | 2005–06 | Scottish Premier League | 16 | 2 | 0 | 0 | 1 | 0 | 2 | 1 | — | | 19 | 3 |
| Celtic | 2006–07 | Scottish Premier League | 0 | 0 | 0 | 0 | 0 | 0 | 0 | 0 | — | | 0 | 0 |
| Celtic | Total | | 158 | 37 | 20 | 4 | 11 | 2 | 38 | 8 | — | | 227 | 51 |
| Leeds United (loan) | 2006–07 | Championship | 11 | 2 | — | | — | | — | | — | | 11 | 2 |
| Leeds United | 2007–08 | League One | 13 | 3 | 0 | 0 | 0 | 0 | — | | 1 (Note: Appearance in Football League Trophy) | 0 | 14 | 3 |
| Leeds United | Total | | 24 | 5 | 0 | 0 | 0 | 0 | — | | 1 | 0 | 25 | 5 |
| Hartlepool United (loan) | 2007–08 | League One | 7 | 1 | — | | — | | — | | — | | 7 | 1 |
| Career total | | | 408 | 81 | 30 | 6 | 42 | 8 | 44 | 8 | 11 | 1 | 535 | 104 |

=== International ===
Appearances and goals by national team and year
| National team | Year | Apps | Goals |
|---|---|---|---|
| England | 2004 | 1 | 0 |
| Total | | 1 | 0 |

== Honours ==
Bolton Wanderers

- Football League First Division: 1996–97; play-offs: 1995
- Football League Cup runner-up: 1994–95

Celtic

- Scottish Premier League: 2000–01, 2001–02, 2003–04, 2005–06
- Scottish Cup: 2000–01, 2003–04, 2004–05; runner-up: 2001–02
- Scottish League Cup: 2005–06; runner-up: 2002–03
- UEFA Cup runner-up: 2002–03

England U19

- FIFA U19 World Cup bronze medal: 1993

Individual

- PFA Team of the Year: 1996–97 First Division
