= Andy Todd (footballer, born 1974) =

English footballer (born 1974)

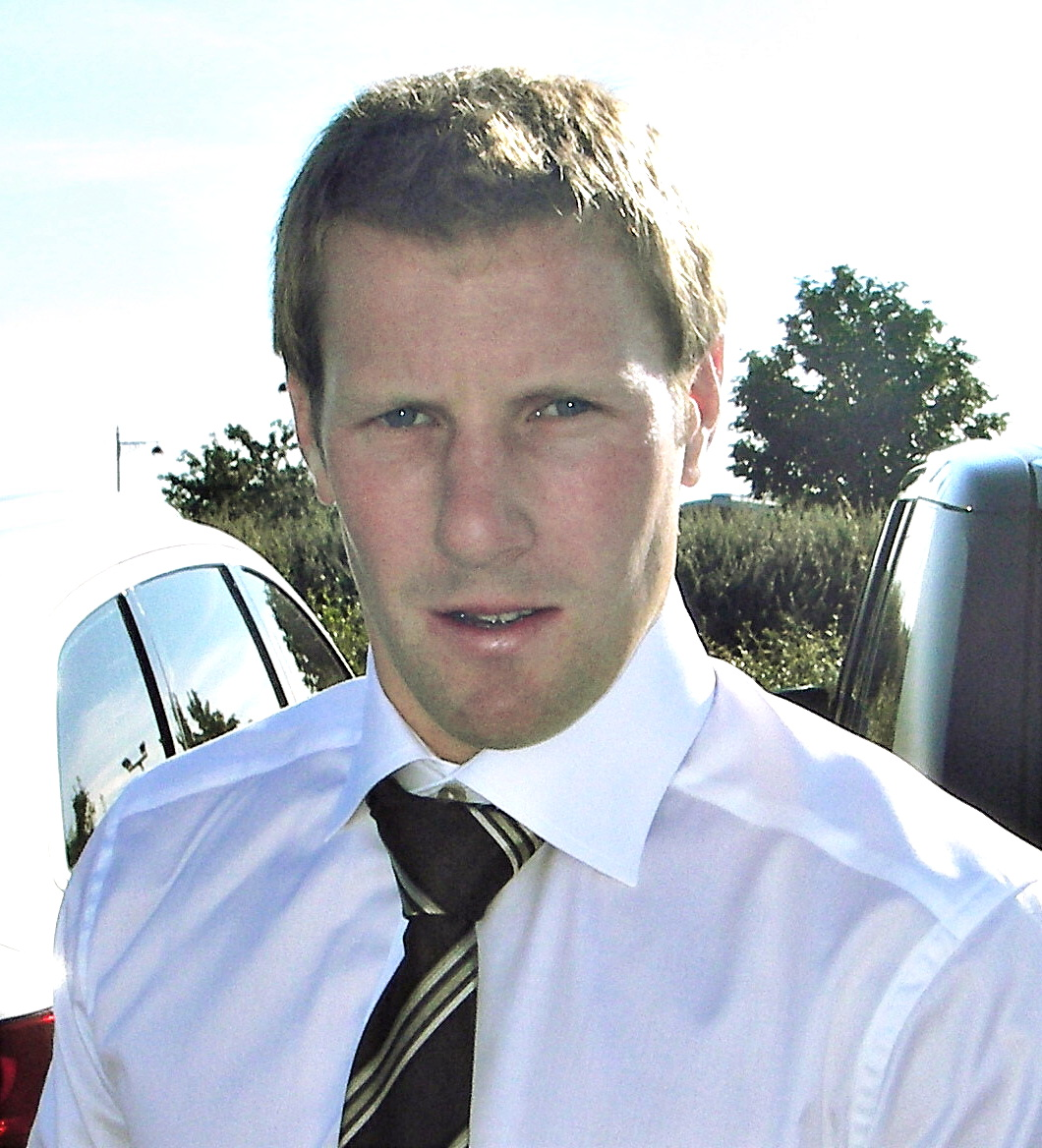
- Todd in 2007

Personal information
- Full name: Andrew John James Todd
- Date of birth: 21 September 1974 (age 52)
- Place of birth: Derby, England
- Height: 5 ft 11 in (1.80 m)
- Position: Centre-back

Youth career
- Middlesbrough

Senior career*
Years	Team	Apps	(Gls)
1992–1995	Middlesbrough	8	(0)
1995	→ Swindon Town (loan)	13	(0)
1995–1999	Bolton Wanderers	84	(2)
1999–2002	Charlton Athletic	40	(1)
2002	→ Grimsby Town (loan)	12	(3)
2002–2007	Blackburn Rovers	88	(4)
2003	→ Burnley (loan)	7	(0)
2007–2009	Derby County	30	(1)
2008–2009	→ Northampton Town (loan)	7	(0)
2009–2011	Perth Glory	40	(0)
2011	Oldham Athletic	6	(0)
2011	Hereford United	4	(0)
2013	Armadale	2	(0)
Total		341	(11)
- * Club domestic league appearances and goals

Andrew John James Todd (born 21 September 1974) is an English football coach and former player.

As a player he was a centre-back who notably played in the Premier League for Bolton Wanderers, Charlton Athletic and Blackburn Rovers, as well as in the Football League for Middlesbrough, Swindon Town, Grimsby Town, Burnley, Derby County, Northampton Town, Oldham Athletic and Hereford United. He also had several spells in Australia with Perth Glory and Armadale SC.

== Playing career ==
=== Middlesbrough ===
Born in Derby, Derbyshire, Todd attended Hermitage Comprehensive School (Chester le Street) playing in the same school football team as Michael Barron, with both players being taken on as youth players at Middlesbrough. He was initially a trainee at Middlesbrough and made his debut in 1992. Todd was loaned to Swindon Town shortly before leaving Boro in August 1995 to join Bolton Wanderers for a transfer fee of £250,000, where he joined his father, who was managing the Trotters.

=== Bolton Wanderers ===
Todd scored on his league debut for the club, losing 5–2 against Liverpool on 23 September 1995. However, he had a slow start to his Bolton Wanderers' career, due to competitions and was demoted to the club's reserve team. But Todd soon had a first team run-ins, playing in the midfield position. However, he suffered ankle injury that affected most of his 1995–96 season. By the time Todd returned from his injuries, Bolton Wanderers was already relegated to Division One and scored on his return in the last game of the season, losing 2–1 against Arsenal. At the end of the 1995–96 season, he made thirteen appearances and scoring two goals in all competitions.

The start of the 1996–97 season saw Todd out with a minor injury. On 7 September 1996, he made his first appearance of the season, coming on as a 73rd-minute substitute, in a 5–2 loss to Southend United. Since returning from injury, Todd found his playing time, coming from the substitute bench. By November, he started five times for Bolton Wanderers, playing in the right–back position. However, injuries and suspension continued to plague Todd's season once again. Despite this, his contributions at the club saw them win the 1996–97 Division One championship in the process and promoted back to the Premiership. At the end of the 1996–97 season, he made eighteen appearances in all competitions.

At the start of the 1997–98 season, Todd found himself out of the first team, due to competitions and his own injury concerns. He then made his first appearance of the season, coming on as a 47th-minute substitute, in a 4–1 loss to Arsenal on 13 September 1997. In a follow–up match against Leyton Orient in the League Cup, Todd scored his first goal of the season, in a 3–1 win. During a 1–0 loss against Aston Villa on 3 October 1997, Todd was involved with Stan Collymore in a physical altercation on the pitch, resulting in both players being sent off and given a three-match ban. After serving a three match ban, he returned to the first team, coming on as a 34th-minute substitute, in a 5–0 loss against Sheffield Wednesday on 8 November 1997. Todd was able to help Bolton Wanderers bounce back by helping the club keep three consecutive clean sheets in the next three matches. Following his return from suspension, Todd became a first team regular at Bolton Wanderers, forming a centre–back partnership with Guðni Bergsson, while also facing competition from Mark Fish. Throughout the second–half of the season, he found himself sustained with injury and suspension but this did not affect his first team place. Following the club's relegation, his performance earned him accolades and recognition throughout the season, including the Supporters Association Player of the Season award. At the end of the 1997–98 season, Todd made thirty appearances and scoring once in all competitions. On 2 June 1998, he signed a contract with Bolton Wanderers, keeping him until 2002.

The start of the 1998–99 season saw Todd appeared five times as a starter in the first five league games. However, he suffered a "bout of pleurisy" that saw him out for four matches. On 3 October 1998, Todd made his return to the starting line–up, in a 2–2 draw against Barnsley. Following his return, he started five matches in the centre–back position between 11 November 1998 and 7 November 1998. However, Todd's return was short–lived when he suffered "a lingering shin-splints condition" that saw him out for months. On 27 February 1999, Todd returned to the starting line–up against Crewe Alexandra, only for him to be substituted at half–time, in a 3–1 loss, and missed three matches. On 13 March 1999, he made his return to first team, coming on as a late substitute, in a 2–1 win against Queens Park Rangers. Since returning to the first team, Todd remains in the first team spotlight for the remainder of the season despite being suspended twice on two separate occasions. He helped Bolton Wanderers reach the Football League First Division play-off final, as the club went on to lose 2–0 against Watford. At the end of the 1998–99 season, Todd went on to make twenty–six appearances in all competitions.

Ahead of the 1999–00 season, Todd was subjected a move away from Bolton Wanderers. Amid the transfer speculation, he appeared six times as a starter in the first six league games. In a match against Charlton Athletic on 11 September 1999, Todd received a straight red card alongside Graham Stuart for after they were involved in "a punch up in first half overtime", as the club went on to lose 2–1. After a serving three match suspension, he returned to the first team, coming on as a 68th-minute substitute, in a 1–0 win against Huddersfield Town on 16 October 1999. Following this, Todd received a first team run ins for the next five matches for Bolton Wanderers. However in November 1999, he was suspended from Bolton Wanderers after allegedly breaking assistant manager Phil Brown's jaw in an incident at a team bonding session. Up until his departure from Bolton Wanderers, Todd had a recurring injuries, including a groin injury but he managed to quickly recover in time for matchday.

By the time Todd left the club, he made sixteen appearances in all competitions. During his time at the club, Todd scored two goals in total for Bolton Wanderers over a four-year period.

=== Charlton Athletic ===
Just two days after being suspended by Bolton Wanderers, Todd then moved to Charlton Athletic, another Division One club, in "a £750,000 transfer, with 'add-ons' taking the deal to £1 million". He was previously linked with a move to Nottingham Forest and Wolverhampton Wanderers.

However, Todd played mostly in central midfield position in the club's winning squad that saw them club won Division One for a second time, as he only made twelve appearances at the end of the 1999–00. In Charlton Athletic's first season back in the Premiership, Todd continued to remain in the first team despite being plagued with injuries. He scored his first and what turned out to be only goal for the club against Leicester City on 1 April 2001. Having helped Charlton Athletic stay in the Premiership in their first season, Todd went on to make 28 appearances and scoring once in all competitions.

In the 2001–02 season, Todd made five appearances for Charlton Athletic. However, a training fracas with a then unnamed player (who was later revealed to be Dean Kiely), meant that he was on a knife-edge at the club. As a result, Todd was placed on a transfer-list by the club and dropped him from the squad. He was also ordered to apologise to Kiely. However, Kiely revealed that he yet to receive an apology from Todd. Following this, he was initially welcomed back to the squad, playing for Charlton Athletic's reserve team before suffering an injury that kept him out for months.

==== Grimsby Town (loan) ====
On 21 February 2002, Todd was loaned to Grimsby Town, who at the time were struggling in Division One.

He made his debut for the club, starting the whole game, in a 0–0 draw against Nottingham Forest the next day. This was followed up by scoring the next two matches against Stockport County and Crystal Palace. On 15 March 2002, Todd scored his third goal for Grimsby Town, which was the winning goal against Wolverhampton Wanderers. He went on to score three goals in twelve league games for the Mariners, helping the club keep their place in the division. After leaving Grimsby Town, Todd earned a cult hero status from the Mariners supporters.

=== Blackburn Rovers ===
In May 2002, Todd left for Blackburn Rovers for £750,000, with 'add-ons' taking the deal to £1 million", based on appearances. It came after manager Graeme Souness was impressed with his performance at the trial. The club managed to beat newly promoted Premiership side Portsmouth, who was also interested in signing him.

He made his debut for Blackburn Rovers, starting the whole game in the right–back position, in for the 1–1 draw with CSKA Sofia in the UEFA Cup. However, Todd found his first team opportunities hard to come by, due to competitions in the defence, as well as, his own injury concern. He had to wait until 9 November 2002 to make his league debut for the club, in a 1–1 draw against Southampton. However in a match against his former club, Charlton Athletic, on 24 November 2022, Todd was at fault when he allowed the first two goals for the opposition team, as Blackburn Rovers went on to lose 3–1. This led Portsmouth to renew their interest in signing him, but Todd was stay put at the club. Soon after breaking into the team in January 2003, he was sent off against Birmingham City for kicking Christophe Dugarry in an off the ball incident on 18 January 2003. After the match, Todd served a four match suspension. After not playing for a month, he scored his first goal for Blackburn Rovers, in a 3–2 victory over Leeds United towards the end of that season. At the end of the 2002–03 season, Todd made nineteen appearances and scoring once in all competitions.

Ahead of 2003–04 season, Todd was put on the transfer list by manager Souness, due to lack of first-team opportunities under him. After being recalled by Souness due to Blackburn Rovers' defensive crisis, he made his first appearance of the season, starting the match, in a 1–0 loss against Charlton Athletic on 20 October 2003. Following his return, Todd was thrust straight back into Blackburn Rovers' first eleven with the team struggling near the bottom of the league. His performances was praised by manager Souness, describing it as "outstanding". However, he continued to be plague with injuries and suspension on two separate occasions throughout the 2003–04 season. By April, Todd was dropped from the starting line–up after his relationship with Souness deteriorated and never played for the club's first team for the rest of the 2003–04 season It came after when he scored an own goal, in a 4–0 loss against Liverpool on 5 April 2004. Despite this, Todd was awarded Blackburn Rovers' supporters' player of the year. At the end of the 2003–04 season, he made twenty–nine appearances in all competitions.

Ahead of the 2004–05 season, Todd stated that he wanted to stay at Blackburn Rovers to fight for his placer in the first team. It came after when Todd was expected to leave the club, due to his falling out with Souness. He, alongside Dwight Yorke, were even dropped from Blackburn Rovers' pre–season tour by Souness. Even staying at the club when the summer transfer window closed and Mark Hughes appointed as a new manager, Todd remained out of the first team for three months, due to a knee injury. He made his first appearance of the season, starting the whole game, in a 1–1 draw against Norwich City on 6 November 2004. Following this, Todd won back his place in the first team under the management of Mark Hughes. In a match against Crystal Palace on 11 December 2004, he helped Blackburn Rovers keep a clean sheet, in a goalless draw, which local newspaper The Lancashire Evening Telegraph described his performance as 'Paul Burrell-like'. On 24 December 2004, in a buildup to a match against Newcastle United at the St James' Park, newspaper The Lancashire Telegraph mentioned Todd's name as he and Garry Flitcroft "are to be fired up for the visit of the under-fire". Todd scored an equalising goal to draw 2–2 against the Magpies on Boxing Day. His performances led the club to open talks with him over a new contract. Todd was handed the Blackburn Rovers' captaincy by Mark Hughes following the departure of Barry Ferguson to Rangers, a recognition of his continued solid performances. On 2 February 2005, he signed a new contract with the club, keeping him until 2008. Following the new signing of Ryan Nelsen, they formed a centre–back partnership and manager Hughes praised their effective partnership. Todd helped the club keep three consecutive clean sheets in the league between 12 February 2005 and 16 March 2005. He helped Blackburn Rovers reach the semi–finals of the FA Cup by beating Leicester City on 13 March 2005. Todd, once again, helped the club keep four consecutive clean sheets in the league between 2 April 2005 and 23 April 2005. During the near end of a 2005 FA Cup Semi Final against Arsenal, he elbowed Robin van Persie in the head, drawing blood, as Blackburn Rovers went on to lose 3–0. After the involvement from his father, the FA subsequently cleared him of any wrongdoing. Despite being out on two separate occasions later in the 2004–05 season, due to suspension and injury, he once again won the player of the year. Todd went on to finish the 2004–05 season, making thirty–two appearances and scoring two times in all competitions.

In the opening game of the 2005–06 season, Todd scored his first goal of the season, in a 3–1 loss against West Ham United. In the absence of Nelsen, he captained Blackburn Rovers for the first time this season against Tottenham Hotspur and helped the club keep a clean sheet, in a 0–0 draw. During the match, Todd allegedly headbutted Andy Reid, which he was charged by the FA. As a result, Todd was suspended for three matches before he suffered another injury that kept him out briefly. Reflecting on his actions, Todd acknowledged his actions and got himself to blame, stating "I've since served my punishment but, to be fair, the lads have been different class while I've been out" but he insisted that he's" not a dirty player, who never deliberately injured anyone and never gone over the top with anyone". On 15 October 2005, Todd made his return from the sidelines, coming on as a 35th-minute substitute, in a 1–0 loss against Liverpool. He then suffered a knock on two separate occasions during the match against Liverpool on 15 October 2005 and Charlton Athletic on 5 November 2005 but he made a full recovery. However, Todd received a straight red card in the 31st minute for handball, as the club went on to lose 2–0 against Everton on 3 December 2005, which saw him serve one match. However, February proved to a struggling moment for him, as he began to make mistakes, including allowing a goal during a 4–3 win against Manchester United on 2 February 2006. But Todd was able to improve his performance by helping Blackburn Rovers keep a clean sheet in a 1–0 win against Arsenal and then scoring his second goal of the season, in a 2–0 win against Aston Villa. After sitting out for the five matches, Todd returned to the first team for a match against Birmingham City on 20 April 2006, he was involved in a row with manager Hughes after reacting angry to being substituted in the 75th minute and threw his captain's armband to the floor in disgust before returning to the dug-out. After the match, manager Hughes acknowledged that he and Todd "have a difference of opinion over his decision to substitute him at Birmingham recently", but also revealed that the player suffered a knee injury that kept him out for the rest of the 2005–06 season. Despite this, his contributions the club earn European qualification the following season. Throughout the 2005–06 season, he found himself in a competition over a place in the starting eleven, competing with Nelson, Aaron Mokoena, Zurab Khizanishvili and Dominic Matteo. At the end of the 2005–06 season, Todd went on to make twenty–eight appearances and scoring two goals in all competitions.

Ahead of the 2006–07 season, Todd announced his intention to stay at Blackburn Rovers, having fallen out of favour with Hughes. However in the opening game of the season, he received a straight red card in the last minute of the game, as the club lose 3–0 against Portsmouth. After the match, his red card was rescinded by the FA. However, Todd was dropped from the squad by manager Hughes after he began to prefer using Nelsen and André Ooijer and told him to fight for his place in the first team. While on the sidelines, Todd's name came up in the 2006 allegations of corruption in English football. Then Portsmouth manager Harry Redknapp was secretly filmed discussing the possibility of buying Todd with agent Peter Harrison, which is illegal under FA rules. However, the programme merely showed Harrison approaching Redknapp and asking direct questions which Redknapp answered. Redknapp simply stated, "Yeah, I'd have him, I like Toddy, he's a tough b*****d." On 9 December 2006, Todd made his first appearance in four months, coming on as a second–half substitute, in a 3–1 loss against Newcastle United. He then started four matches throughout December, helping the club win three matches. Todd had, however, found first team opportunities hard to come by during the latter stages of the 2006–2007 season and went on to make thirteen appearances in all competitions.

After talks with Todd, Mark Hughes let it be known that he was available for transfer, leading to Derby County, Sunderland, Birmingham City, Wigan Athletic and Portsmouth all expressed an interest in signing him.

==== Burnley (loan) ====
With his first team opportunity at Blackburn Rovers limited, Todd was loaned to Burnley on Deadline Day. Despite interest from Wolverhampton Wanderers, the club's chairman Barry Kilby described the move as a "coup". Upon joining the Clarets, he said: "It's not a problem moving here. I'm here to play football, not upset anyone, and it's a chance to help Burnley."

Todd made his debut for Burnley, starting the whole game, in a 2–1 win against Stoke City on 5 September 2003. Local newspaper The Lancashire Evening Telegraph reacted positively on his debut in the Clarets shirt, forming a centre–back partnership with David May. For his performance, he was one of the club's five players to be named Nationwide First Division Team of the Week. Since making his debut for the club, he started in the next matches for the Clarets. However on 30 September 2024, Todd was recalled by his parent club. By the time he left Burnley, Todd made eight appearances for the Clarets.

=== Derby County ===
Todd joined Derby County, a newly promoted Premier League club, for an undisclosed fee believed to be around £750,000 on 7 July 2007.

He scored a late equaliser on his debut against Portsmouth on 11 August 2007. However, Todd suffered both hamstring and back problems that saw him out for months. He made his return from injury, starting the whole game, in a 1–0 loss against Wigan Athletic on 12 January 2008. However, his performance level soon dropped and after making two mistakes in Derby's 4–1 FA Cup defeat to Preston North End, Derby boss Paul Jewell dropped him. It was announced on 8 May 2008 that Todd was not in Jewell's plans for his restructuring of the Derby squad following relegation and he would be allowed to leave on a free transfer.

On 24 November 2008, Todd joined Northampton Town of League One on loan until 3 January 2009. This was the first time Todd had played outside the top two tiers of English football. On 25 November 2008, Todd made his debut for The Cobblers in 2–1 victory against Leeds United. He returned to Derby County in January 2009, after featuring in seven league games for Northampton. His first game for Derby after returning from Northampton was the League Cup semi-final first leg against Manchester United, with Todd helping the club to a 1–0 victory. He also played in the second leg of the semi-final, but could not prevent Derby County losing 4–3 on aggregate. Todd appeared regularly at the end of the season, and his solid performances led to rumours that manager Nigel Clough would offer Todd a new one-year contract. However, it was later announced that Todd would not be offered an extension when his contract expired at the end of the 2008–09 season, which saw Todd linked with a possible move to Australia with Sydney FC and Perth Glory.

=== Perth Glory ===
On 22 April 2009, the Sydney Morning Herald reported that Todd signed for A-League club Perth Glory and would see out the rest of his career playing in Australia. He completed the move to Australia on 18 May 2009.

Todd made his Perth Glory debut, starting the match, in a 1-0 loss against Adelaide United in the opening game of the season. Since joining the club, he became a first team regular, forming a centre-back partnership with Chris Coyne. Together, they conceded only three goals in the first month to the season. The partnership was praised by manager Dave Mitchell. At one point during the season, Todd played in a midfield position, due to an injury crisis in the midfield position. However, he found himself out of the first team, due was out with injuries and suspension, including a second-bookable offence against Adelaide United on 9 October 2009. In the last game of the season, Todd was named as captain for Perth Glory and kept a clean sheet, in a 2-0 win against Brisbane Roar. However, he was unsuccessful in helping the club in the Finals series after the club loss 1-0 against Wellington Phoenix. In what turned out to be an outstanding debut season performance, making twenty-six appearances in all competitions, Todd was awarded Perth Glory's 'Most Glorious Player' award for 2009–10. On 8 March 2010, he signed a one-year contract extension with the club.

At the start of the 2010-11 season, Todd suffered a knee injury that saw him out for a month. He made his return from injury, coming on as a late substitute, in a 2-1 win against Wellington Phoenix on 5 September 2010. Following his return, Todd resumed his centre-back partnership with Coyne. However, he, once again, suffered injuries that saw him out for the rest of the year. Todd made his return from injury, coming on as a second-half substitute, in a 0-0 draw against Gold Coast United on 3 January 2011. On 20 January 2011, he was released by the club, two months before the end of his contract, to allow him to find a new club during the transfer window. By the time Todd left Perth Glory, he made fifteen appearances in all competitions.

=== Oldham Athletic ===
On 27 January 2011, Todd joined Oldham Athletic after returning to the United Kingdom, signing a contract for the remainder of the season.

He made his debut for the club coming on against Carlisle United at Brunton Park. Todd made his first start for the club when replacing the suspended Reuben Hazell, starting against Carlisle United at Boundary Park. At the end of the season he was informed that he was out of contract and would not be offered a new deal.

=== Hereford United ===
On 14 October 2011, Todd moved to Hereford United, on a non-contract basis having previously been on trial with Port Vale and Burton Albion.

He made his debut for the club, starting the whole game, in a 2–0 win against Bradford City on 15 October 2011. However, Todd was released by Hereford management after just four appearances in a Hereford shirt, due to a belief his legs had 'gone' and has retired from professional football. In response to some criticism of the decision from a number of Hereford fans, Hereford United Director of Football Gary Peters confirmed the decision to release the highly regarded fan's favourite on the club website (6 November 2011).

=== Armadale ===
In March 2013 it was announced that Todd came out of retirement to sign for Australian club Armadale in the Football West State League, Premier Division. He went on to make two appearances for the club before retiring from professional football once again.

== Coaching career ==
=== Non-playing coaching staff ===
On 26 April 2014, it was announced that Todd was appointed as the assistant manager to Warren Feeney at NIFL Premiership club Linfield in Northern Ireland, effective on 1 May 2014. Todd retained that position when David Healy was appointed the new manager of Linfield on 14 October 2015, as Feeney quit the job to become the assistant manager of Newport County.

On 15 January 2016, Warren Feeney was appointed as the manager of League Two club Newport County with Todd appointed as assistant manager. A positive start saw Newport gain 21 points from the first 12 games, but results later worsened. Newport finished the season in 22nd place in League Two, avoiding relegation. Feeney and Todd were dismissed by Newport on 28 September 2016 with Newport County bottom of League Two having gained just 6 points from their first 9 matches of the 2016–17 season.

From October 2016 to June 2018, Todd was the assistant under Gary Bowyer at Blackpool.

In March 2019, Todd was appointed as the assistant manager of Bradford City, again under Bowyer. Todd left Bradford City in May 2019, following the club's relegation to League Two.

In January 2020, Todd was appointed as the assistant manager of Bulgarian side Pirin Blagoevgrad again, under Feeney. He quickly settled in the country despite the pandemic. However in October, Todd left the club, "citing personal reasons".

== Personal life ==
His father is former Derby County and England defender Colin Todd who was manager of Middlesbrough when Andy made his debut. He spoke about his relationship with his father while they were at Bolton Wanderers.

Todd is married to his wife, Dawn, and together, they have three children. Todd and his wife took part in a charity organisation.

== Career statistics ==
Appearances and goals by club, season and competition
Club	Season	League			National Cup		League Cup		Continental		Other (Note: Includes other competitive competitions, including the Football League Trophy, the play-offs, and the A-League finals)		Total	
Club	Season	Division	Apps	Goals	Apps	Goals	Apps	Goals	Apps	Goals	Apps	Goals	Apps	Goals
Middlesbrough	1993–94	First Division	3	0	—		1	0	—		—		4	0
Middlesbrough	1994–95	First Division	5	0	—		1	0	—		—		6	0
Middlesbrough	Total		8	0	0	0	2	0	0	0	0	0	10	0
Swindon Town (loan)	1994–95	First Division	13	0	—		—		—		—		13	0
Bolton Wanderers	1995–96	Premier League	12	2	—		1	0	—		—		13	2
Bolton Wanderers	1996–97	First Division	15	0	—		3	0	—		—		18	0
Bolton Wanderers	1997–98	Premier League	25	0	1	0	4	1	—		—		30	1
Bolton Wanderers	1998–99	First Division	20	0	—		3	0	—		3	0	26	0
Bolton Wanderers	1999–2000	First Division	12	0	—		4	0	—		—		16	0
Bolton Wanderers	Total		84	2	1	0	15	1	0	0	3	0	103	3
Charlton Athletic	1999–2000	First Division	12	0	4	0	—		—		—		16	0
Charlton Athletic	2000–01	Premier League	23	1	3	0	2	0	—		—		28	1
Charlton Athletic	2001–02	Premier League	5	0	—		2	0	—		—		7	0
Charlton Athletic	Total		40	1	7	0	4	0	0	0	0	0	51	1
Grimsby Town (loan)	2001–02	First Division	12	3	—		—		—		—		12	3
Blackburn Rovers	2002–03	Premier League	12	1	2	0	4	0	1	0	—		19	1
Blackburn Rovers	2003–04	Premier League	19	0	1	0	—		1	0	—		21	0
Blackburn Rovers	2004–05	Premier League	26	1	6	0	—		—		—		32	1
Blackburn Rovers	2005–06	Premier League	22	2	2	1	4	0	—		—		28	3
Blackburn Rovers	2006–07	Premier League	9	0	2	0	—		2	0	—		13	0
Blackburn Rovers	Total		88	4	13	1	8	0	4	0	0	0	113	5
Burnley (loan)	2003–04	First Division	7	0	—		1	0	—		—		8	0
Derby County	2007–08	Premier League	19	1	3	0	1	0	—		—		23	1
Derby County	2008–09	Championship	11	0	—		2	0	—		—		13	0
Derby County	Total		30	1	3	0	3	0	0	0	0	0	36	0
Northampton Town (loan)	2008–09	League One	7	0	—		-		—		—		7	0
Perth Glory	2009–10	A-League	25	0			—		—		1	0	26	0
Perth Glory	2010–11	A-League	15	0			—		—		—		15	0
Perth Glory	Total		40	0			0	0	0	0	1	0	41	0
Oldham Athletic	2010–11	League One	6	0	—		—		—		—		6	0
Hereford United	2011–12	League Two	4	0	—		—		—		—		4	0
Armadale	2012–13	Football West State League Premier Division	2	0	—		—		—		—		2	0
Career total			341	11	24	1	33	1	4	0	4	0	406	13

== Honours ==
Middlesbrough

- Football League Division One: 1994–95

Bolton Wanderers

- Football League Division One: 1996–97

Charlton Athletic

- Football League Division One: 1999–2000

Individual

- Perth Glory Most Glorious Player Award: 2009–10
- Perth Glory Player's Player of the Year: 2009–10
- Perth Glory Member's Player of the Year: 2009–10
