= 2003–04 Blackburn Rovers F.C. season =

Blackburn Rovers
2003–04 season
- Chairman: John Williams
- Manager: Graeme Souness
- Premier League: 15th
- FA Cup: Third round
- League Cup: Third round
- UEFA Cup: First round
- Top goalscorer: League: Andy Cole (11); All: Andy Cole (11)
- Highest home attendance: 30,074 (vs. Liverpool, 13 September 2003)
- Lowest home attendance: 19,939 (vs. Charlton Athletic, 20 October 2003)
- Average home league attendance: 24,376

During the 2003–04 English football season, Blackburn Rovers competed in the FA Premier League (known as the FA Barclaycard Premiership for sponsorship reasons).

== Season summary ==
Finishing sixth in the Premiership at the end of 2002–03 had booked Blackburn Rovers their second successive UEFA Cup campaign, but it was short-lived. A 5–1 opening-day victory against newly promoted Wolverhampton Wanderers kickstarted their new season, however, their overall Premiership form was far too dismal to give the side any hope of a third successive European qualification. Indeed, much of the season was spent battling against relegation; a decent finish to the season saw relegation fears eradicated by the end of April. Rovers finished 15th in the final table, putting intense pressure on manager Graeme Souness to turn things around.

== Final league table ==
Pos	Team	Pld	W	D	L	GF	GA	GD	Pts
13	Portsmouth	38	12	9	17	47	54	−7	45
14	Tottenham Hotspur	38	13	6	19	47	57	−10	45
15	Blackburn Rovers	38	12	8	18	51	59	−8	44
16	Manchester City	38	9	14	15	55	54	+1	41
17	Everton	38	9	12	17	45	57	−12	39

Source: Premier League
Rules for classification: 1) points; 2) goal difference; 3) number of goals scored.

== Players ==
=== First-team squad ===
Squad at end of season

Note: Flags indicate national team as defined under FIFA eligibility rules; some limited exceptions apply. Players may hold more than one non-FIFA nationality.

No.	Pos.	Nation	Player
1	GK	USA	Brad Friedel
2	DF	AUS	Lucas Neill
3	DF	SVK	Vratislav Greško
5	DF	ITA	Lorenzo Amoruso
6	DF	ENG	Craig Short
7	MF	ENG	Garry Flitcroft
8	MF	TUR	Tugay Kerimoğlu
9	FW	ENG	Andy Cole
10	FW	ENG	Matt Jansen
11	DF	GER	Markus Babbel (on loan from Liverpool)
12	MF	IRL	Steven Reid (Note: Reid was born in Kingston upon Thames, England, but also qualifies to represent the Republic of Ireland internationally through his mother, and made his international debut for the Republic of Ireland in 2001.)
14	DF	SWE	Nils-Eric Johansson

No.	Pos.	Nation	Player
15	DF	ENG	Andy Todd
17	FW	SCO	Paul Gallagher
18	FW	ENG	Jonathan Stead
19	FW	TRI	Dwight Yorke
20	MF	ENG	David Thompson
23	MF	AUS	Brett Emerton
24	MF	SCO	Barry Ferguson
25	MF	NOR	Martin Andresen (on loan from Stabæk)
26	MF	IRL	Jonathan Douglas
30	MF	ENG	Neil Danns
31	GK	FIN	Peter Enckelman
33	DF	ENG	Michael Gray

=== Left club during season ===
Note: Flags indicate national team as defined under FIFA eligibility rules; some limited exceptions apply. Players may hold more than one non-FIFA nationality.

No.	Pos.	Nation	Player
4	DF	ENG	Martin Taylor (to Birmingham City)
13	GK	IRL	Alan Kelly (retired)
16	MF	IRL	Alan Mahon (on loan to Ipswich Town; to Wigan Athletic)
18	FW	ITA	Corrado Grabbi (to Ancona)
21	MF	ITA	Dino Baggio (on loan from Lazio)

No.	Pos.	Nation	Player
22	FW	NOR	Egil Østenstad (to Rangers)
25	DF	GER	Sebastian Pelzer (to Eintracht Trier)
26	MF	IRL	Jonathan Douglas (on loan to Blackpool)
27	DF	SCO	Gordon Greer (to Kilmarnock)
30	MF	ENG	Neil Danns (on loan to Blackpool and Hartlepool United)

=== Reserve squad ===
The following players did not appear for the first-team this season.

Note: Flags indicate national team as defined under FIFA eligibility rules; some limited exceptions apply. Players may hold more than one non-FIFA nationality.

No.	Pos.	Nation	Player
22	MF	ENG	Ciaran Donnelly
28	GK	GER	David Yelldell (Note: Yelldell was born in Stuttgart, West Germany, but also qualified to represent the United States internationally and made his international debut for the United States in March 2011)
29	DF	ENG	Jay McEveley (Note: McEveley was born in Liverpool, England, but also qualified to represent Scotland internationally and made his full international debut for Scotland in August 2007)
—	DF	ENG	Alex Bruce
—	DF	ENG	Michael Taylor
—	DF	SCO	Craig Barr
—	DF	IRL	John Fitzgerald

No.	Pos.	Nation	Player
—	DF	IRL	Gavin Peers
—	MF	ENG	Jerome Watt
—	MF	SCO	Ian Black
—	MF	SCO	Gary Harkins
—	MF	SCO	Alan Morgan
—	FW	ENG	Matt Derbyshire
—	FW	USA	Jemal Johnson

== Statistics ==
=== Appearances and goals ===
No.	Pos	Nat	Player	Total		Premier League		FA Cup		League Cup		UEFA Cup	
No.	Pos	Nat	Player	Apps	Goals	Apps	Goals	Apps	Goals	Apps	Goals	Apps	Goals
Goalkeepers
1	GK	(United States) USA	Brad Friedel	40	1	36	1	1	0	1	0	2	0
31	GK	(Finland) FIN	Peter Enckelman	2	0	2	0	0	0	0	0	0	0
Defenders
2	DF	(Australia) AUS	Lucas Neill	35	2	30+2	2	1	0	1	0	1	0
3	DF	(Slovakia) SVK	Vratislav Greško	28	1	22+2	1	1	0	1	0	2	0
5	DF	(Italy) ITA	Lorenzo Amoruso	14	3	11+1	3	0	0	0	0	2	0
6	DF	(England) ENG	Craig Short	20	1	19	1	1	0	0	0	0	0
11	DF	(Germany) GER	Markus Babbel	28	3	23+2	3	1	0	1	0	1	0
14	DF	(Sweden) SWE	Nils-Eric Johansson	15	0	7+7	0	0	0	0+1	0	0	0
15	DF	(England) ENG	Andy Todd	21	0	19	0	1	0	0	0	1	0
33	DF	(England) ENG	Michael Gray	14	0	14	0	0	0	0	0	0	0
Midfielders
7	MF	(England) ENG	Garry Flitcroft	33	3	29+2	3	1	0	0	0	1	0
8	MF	(Turkey) TUR	Tugay Kerimoğlu	40	1	30+6	1	1	0	1	0	2	0
12	MF	(Republic of Ireland) IRL	Steven Reid	19	0	9+7	0	0	0	1	0	1+1	0
20	MF	(England) ENG	David Thompson	14	1	10+1	1	0	0	1	0	2	0
23	MF	(Australia) AUS	Brett Emerton	40	3	31+6	2	0	0	0+1	0	2	1
24	MF	(Scotland) SCO	Barry Ferguson	16	2	14+1	1	0	0	1	1	0	0
25	MF	(Norway) NOR	Martin Andresen	11	0	11	0	0	0	0	0	0	0
26	MF	(Republic of Ireland) IRL	Jonathan Douglas	14	1	14	1	0	0	0	0	0	0
30	MF	(England) ENG	Neil Danns	1	0	0+1	0	0	0	0	0	0	0
Forwards
9	FW	(England) ENG	Andy Cole	37	11	27+7	11	1	0	1	0	0+1	0
10	FW	(England) ENG	Matt Jansen	21	3	9+10	2	0	0	0	0	2	1
17	FW	(Scotland) SCO	Paul Gallagher	28	3	12+14	3	1	0	0+1	0	0	0
18	FW	(England) ENG	Jon Stead	15	6	13	6	0	0	0	0	1+1	0
19	FW	(Trinidad and Tobago) TRI	Dwight Yorke	27	6	15+8	4	0+1	0	1	2	1+1	0
Players transferred out during the season
4	DF	(England) ENG	Martin Taylor	14	0	10+1	0	0+1	0	1	0	0+1	0
16	MF	(Republic of Ireland) IRL	Alan Mahon	4	0	1+2	0	1	0	0	0	0	0
18	FW	(Italy) ITA	Corrado Grabbi	7	0	0+5	0	0	0	0	0	1+1	0
21	MF	(Italy) ITA	Dino Baggio	12	1	0+9	1	0+1	0	0	0	1+1	0

Last updated: 31 May 2004

== Results ==
=== Premier League ===
==== Results by matchday ====
Matchday	1	2	3	4	5	6	7	8	9	10	11	12	13	14	15	16	17	18	19	20	21	22	23	24	25	26	27	28	29	30	31	32	33	34	35	36	37	38
Ground	H	A	H	A	H	A	H	A	H	A	A	H	A	H	A	A	H	H	A	A	H	A	H	A	H	A	H	H	A	H	A	H	A	H	A	H	A	H
Result	W	D	L	D	L	W	L	L	L	L	L	W	L	W	W	L	L	D	W	D	L	D	L	W	D	L	D	L	W	L	L	L	W	W	W	W	L	D
Position	1	4	7	9	10	9	11	12	15	16	19	16	17	16	14	14	16	16	14	15	16	16	16	14	14	15	15	16	15	16	16	17	17	16	14	13	13	15

Source: worldfootball.net
A = Away; H = Home; W = Win; D = Draw; L = Loss

16 August 2003 1	Blackburn Rovers	5–1	Wolverhampton Wanderers	Blackburn, Lancashire
15:00 BST	Amoruso 17'; Thompson 29'; Emerton 52'; Cole 79', 87'	Report	Iversen 71'	Stadium: Ewood Park; Attendance: 26,270; Referee: Jeff Winter

23 August 2003 2	Bolton Wanderers	2–2	Blackburn Rovers	Bolton, Greater Manchester
15:00 BST	Djorkaeff 3' (pen.); Davies 25'	Report	Jansen 50'; Yorke 90'	Stadium: Reebok Stadium; Attendance: 27,423; Referee: Andy D'Urso

25 August 2003 3	Blackburn Rovers	2–3	Manchester City	Blackburn, Lancashire
20:00	Sinclair 44' (o.g.); Amoruso 61'	Report	4' Tarnat; 59' Barton; 87' Anelka	Stadium: Ewood Park; Attendance: 23,361; Referee: Alan Wiley (Staffordshire)

30 August 2003 4	Chelsea	2–2	Blackburn Rovers	Fulham, London
15:00 BST (UTC+01)	Mutu 45'; Hasselbaink 63' (pen.)	Report	Cole 1', 58'	Stadium: Stamford Bridge; Attendance: 41,066; Referee: Mike Dean

12 September 2003 5	Blackburn Rovers	1–3	Liverpool	Blackburn, Lancashire
15:00	Jansen 8'; Neill (red card) 45'	Report	Owen 12' (pen.), 68'; Kewell 90'	Stadium: Ewood Park; Attendance: 30,074; Referee: Neale Barry

20 September 2003 6	Portsmouth	1–2	Blackburn Rovers	Portsmouth, Hampshire
15:00	De Zeeuw 57'	Report	Neill 35'; Cole 43'	Stadium: Fratton Park; Attendance: 20,024; Referee: Paul Durkin

28 September 2003 7	Blackburn Rovers	0–2	Fulham	Blackburn, Lancashire
15:00		Report	Luís Boa Morte 5'; Louis Saha 56'	Stadium: Ewood Park; Attendance: 21,985; Referee: Matt Messias

4 October 2003 8	Leeds United	2–1	Blackburn Rovers	Leeds, West Yorkshire
15:00	Johnson 11', 27'	Report	Baggio 86'	Stadium: Elland Road; Attendance: 35,039; Referee: Uriah Rennie

20 October 2003 9	Blackburn Rovers	0–1	Charlton Athletic	Blackburn, Lancashire
20:00 BST		Report	Hreidarsson 33'	Stadium: Ewood Park; Attendance: 19,939; Referee: Graham Barber

25 October 2003 10	Southampton	2–0	Blackburn Rovers	Southampton, Hampshire
15:00	Beattie 59'; Griffit 87'	Report		Stadium: St Mary's Stadium; Attendance: 31,620; Referee: Steve Bennett

2 November 2003 11	Leicester City	2–0	Blackburn Rovers	Leicester, Leicestershire
16:05	Bent 75'; Howey 82'	Report		Stadium: Walkers Stadium; Attendance: 30,975; Referee: Dermot Gallagher

10 November 2003 12	Blackburn Rovers	2–1	Everton	Blackburn, Lancashire
20:00	Babbel 6'; Yorke 13'	Report	Radzinski 49'	Stadium: Ewood Park; Attendance: 22,179; Referee: Paul Dowd

22 November 2003 13	Manchester United	2–1	Blackburn Rovers	Trafford, Greater Manchester
12:30	van Nistelrooy 24'; Kleberson 38'	Report	Emerton 62'	Stadium: Old Trafford; Attendance: 67,748; Referee: Mark Halsey

29 November 2003 14	Blackburn Rovers	1–0	Tottenham Hotspur	Blackburn, Lancashire
15:00	Greško 78'	Report		Stadium: Ewood Park; Attendance: 22,802; Referee: Graham Poll

6 December 2003 15	Birmingham City	0–4	Blackburn Rovers	Birmingham, West Midlands
15:00 GMT (UTC)	Dugarry (red card) 72'	Report	Ferguson 66'; Neill 68'; Tugay 82'; Gallagher 88'	Stadium: St Andrew's; Attendance: 29,354; Referee: Graham Barber

14 December 2003 16	Arsenal	1–0	Blackburn Rovers	Islington, London
14:00 GMT	Bergkamp 11'	Report		Stadium: Highbury; Attendance: 37,677; Referee: Andy D'Urso

20 December 2003 17	Blackburn Rovers	0–2	Aston Villa	Blackburn, Lancashire
15:00		Report	Moore 62'; Ángel 75'	Stadium: Ewood Park; Attendance: 20,722; Referee: Dermot Gallagher

26 December 2003 18	Blackburn Rovers	2–2	Middlesbrough	Blackburn, Lancashire
15:00	Babbel 3', 90'	Report	Juninho 31', 51'	Stadium: Ewood Park; Attendance: 25,452; Referee: Alan Wiley

28 December 2003 19	Newcastle United	0–1	Blackburn Rovers	Newcastle upon Tyne, Tyne and Wear
14:00		Report	Gallagher 72'	Stadium: St James' Park; Attendance: 51,648; Referee: Mark Halsey

7 January 2004 20	Wolverhampton Wanderers	2–2	Blackburn Rovers	Wolverhampton, West Midlands
19:45 GMT	Butler 63'; Rae 72'	Report	Cole 14'; Yorke 78'	Stadium: Molineux; Attendance: 27,393; Referee: Neale Barry

10 January 2004 21	Blackburn Rovers	3–4	Bolton Wanderers	Blackburn, Lancashire
	Greško 3'; Yorke 24'; Cole 34'	Report	Nolan 1', 78'; Djorkaeff 43'; Giannakopoulos 73'	Stadium: Ewood Park; Attendance: 23,538; Referee: Steve Dunn

17 January 2004 22	Manchester City	1–1	Blackburn Rovers	Manchester, Greater Manchester
15:00	Anelka 50'	Report	55' Flitcroft	Stadium: City of Manchester Stadium; Attendance: 47,090; Referee: Mike Dean

1 February 2004 23	Blackburn Rovers	2–3	Chelsea	Blackburn, Lancashire
	Flitcroft 3'; Gallagher 87'	Report	Lampard 25', 35'; Johnson 88'	Stadium: Ewood Park; Attendance: 24,867; Referee: Dermot Gallagher

7 February 2004 24	Middlesbrough	0–1	Blackburn Rovers	Middlesbrough, North Yorkshire
		Report	Stead 39'	Stadium: Ewood Park; Attendance: 28,307; Referee: Rob Styles

11 February 2004 25	Blackburn Rovers	1–1	Newcastle United	Blackburn, Lancashire
	Jon Stead 85'	Report	Craig Bellamy 52'	Stadium: Ewood Park; Attendance: 23,459; Referee: Matt Messias

21 February 2004 26	Charlton Athletic	3–2	Blackburn Rovers	Greenwich, London
	Cole 10'; Euell 36'; Jensen 90'	Report	Cole 74'; Friedel 90'	Stadium: The Valley; Attendance: 26,332; Referee: Uriah Rennie

28 February 2004 27	Blackburn Rovers	1–1	Southampton	Blackburn, Lancashire
	Andy Cole 52'	Report	Kevin Phillips 5'	Stadium: Ewood Park; Attendance: 21,970; Referee: Mike Dean

13 March 2004 28	Blackburn Rovers	0–2	Arsenal	Blackburn, Lancashire
15:00 GMT		Report	Henry 57'; Pires 87'	Stadium: Ewood Park; Attendance: 28,627; Referee: Alan Wiley

20 March 2004 29	Aston Villa	0–2	Blackburn Rovers	Birmingham, West Midlands
15:00		Report	Flitcroft 26'; Stead 36'	Stadium: Villa Park; Attendance: 37,532; Referee: Andy D'Urso

27 March 2004 30	Blackburn Rovers	1–2	Portsmouth	Blackburn, Lancashire
	Tugay 37'	Report	Sheringham 17'; Yakubu 82'	Stadium: Ewood Park; Attendance: 22,855; Referee: Paul Durkin

4 April 2004 31	Liverpool	4–0	Blackburn Rovers	Liverpool, Merseyside
	Owen 7', 24'; Todd 22' (o.g.); Heskey 79'	Report		Stadium: Anfield; Attendance: 41,559; Referee: Jeff Winter

10 April 2004 32	Blackburn Rovers	1–2	Leeds United	Blackburn, Lancashire
	Short 90'	Report	Caldwell 2'; Viduka 89'	Stadium: Ewood Park; Attendance: 26,611; Referee: Steve Dunn

12 April 2004 33	Fulham	3–4	Blackburn Rovers	Fulham, London
	John 26', 45'; Boa Morte 60'	Report	Cole 23'; Douglas 49'; Amoruso 51'; Stead 75'	Attendance: 13,981; Referee: Mike Dean

17 April 2004 34	Blackburn Rovers	1–0	Leicester City	Blackburn, Lancashire
	Dabizas 42' (o.g.)	Report		Stadium: Ewood Park; Attendance: 22,749; Referee: Rob Styles

24 April 2004 35	Everton	0–1	Blackburn Rovers	Liverpool, Merseyside
		Report	Stead 81'	Stadium: Goodison Park; Attendance: 38,884; Referee: Paul Dowd

1 May 2004 36	Blackburn Rovers	1–0	Manchester United	Blackburn, Lancashire
	Stead 85'	Report		Stadium: Ewood Park; Attendance: 29,616; Referee: Mike Dean

8 May 2004 37	Tottenham Hotspur	1–0	Blackburn Rovers	Haringey, London
	Defoe 18'	Report		Stadium: White Hart Lane; Attendance: 35,698; Referee: Andy D'Urso

15 May 2004 38	Blackburn Rovers	1–1	Birmingham City	Blackburn, Lancashire
15:00 BST (UTC+01)	Cole 24'	Report	John 83'	Stadium: Ewood Park; Attendance: 26,070; Referee: Dermot Gallagher

=== FA Cup ===
3 January 2004 Third round	Birmingham City	4–0	Blackburn Rovers	Birmingham, West Midlands
15:00	Morrison 23'; Clemence 36'; Forssell 78'; Hughes 84'	Report		Stadium: St Andrew's; Attendance: 18,688; Referee: Paul Durkin

=== League Cup ===
29 October 2003 Third round	Blackburn Rovers	3–4	Liverpool	Blackburn, Lancashire
20:00	Yorke 35', 90'; Ferguson 81'	Report	Murphy 39' (pen.); Heskey 49', 61'; Kewell 79'	Stadium: Ewood Park; Attendance: 16,918; Referee: Mike Riley

=== UEFA Cup ===
24 September 2003 First round 1 First leg	Gençlerbirliği S.K. (Turkey)	3–1	Blackburn Rovers (England)	Ankara 19 Mayıs Stadium
14:55	Skoko 42'; Youla 43', 60'	Report	Emerton 57'	Attendance: Ulus, Ankara; Referee: Paolo Vertini (Italy)

15 October 2003 Round 1 Leg 2	Blackburn Rovers (England)	1–1	Gençlerbirliği S.K. (Turkey)	Blackburn, Lancashire
20:15	Jansen 64'	Report	Özkan 66'	Stadium: Ewood Park; Attendance: 14,573; Referee: Eric Braamhaar (Netherlands)

== Top scorers ==
=== Premiership ===
- (England) Andy Cole 11
- (England) Jon Stead 6
- (Trinidad and Tobago) Dwight Yorke 4
- (Italy) Lorenzo Amoruso 3
- (Germany) Markus Babbel 3
