= Gerry Taggart =

Northern Irish footballer

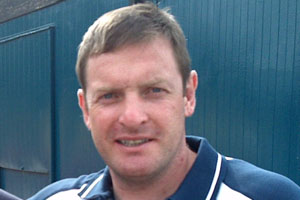
- Taggart in July 2009

Personal information
- Full name: Gerald Taggart
- Date of birth: 18 October 1970 (age 56)
- Place of birth: Belfast, Northern Ireland
- Height: 6 ft 2 in (1.88 m)
- Position: Defender

Senior career*
Years	Team	Apps	(Gls)
1989–1990	Manchester City	12	(1)
1990–1995	Barnsley	212	(16)
1995–1998	Bolton Wanderers	69	(4)
1998–2004	Leicester City	117	(9)
2003–2004	→ Stoke City (loan)	8	(2)
2004–2006	Stoke City	47	(3)
2007	Tamworth	2	(0)
Total		467	(35)

International career
1990–2002	Northern Ireland	51	(7)

Managerial career
- 2007: Leicester City (caretaker manager)
- 2010–2013: Oldham Athletic (assistant manager)
- * Club domestic league appearances and goals

Gerald Taggart (born 18 October 1970) is a Northern Irish former professional footballer. He played for Barnsley, Bolton Wanderers, Leicester City, Manchester City and Stoke City as well as the Northern Ireland national team.

A former defender, Taggart began his career as a trainee with Manchester City in 1989 but joined Barnsley in 1990 after being unable to break into the first team at Maine Road. He soon became a popular player with the "Tykes" supporters due to his passionate and committed performances. After spending five years with Barnsley making 249 appearances he joined Bolton Wanderers where he helped them to win the Division One title in 1996–97. He signed for Leicester City in 1998 and played in back to back League Cup Finals with Leicester winning the cup in 2000. He remained with Leicester until 2003 when he joined Stoke City. He spent three seasons at the Britannia Stadium and after a short spell with Tamworth he retired from playing.

After his retirement in 2007, he began his coaching/managing career for Leicester. On 10 June 2010, he was announced as the new assistant manager at Oldham Athletic. He was placed on garden leave by the club on 31 December 2012 following a run of poor results.

== Club career ==
=== Manchester City ===
Taggart started his career as a trainee with Manchester City in 1989. Taggart spent one season with the club making 13 appearances, and scoring one goal.

=== Barnsley ===
Limited chances in the Manchester City team saw Taggart drop down a division to take up the option of joining Barnsley where he spent five seasons, making the Northern Irish national team in the process. Taggart spent most of his time at Barnsley under former Northern Ireland player Danny Wilson, where he made 247 appearances and scored 20 goals for the club.

=== Bolton Wanderers ===
Taggart signed for Bolton Wanderers for a club record £1.5 million on 1 August 1995, as they prepared for the Premier League after winning promotion from Division One. However, he was unable to prevent them from being relegated after just one season.

In his second season with the club, Taggart helped Bolton reach the Premier League after they had amassed 98 points and scored 100 goals in that season and gained promotion as Champions of the First Division. The following season Taggart was relegated back to the First Division. In a total of three seasons with the club, Taggart made 81 appearances, scoring five goals for Bolton, with one such goal coming in the last ever game at the clubs old Burnden Park ground against Charlton Athletic in April 1997.

=== Leicester City ===
Taggart again played in the Premier League when he signed for Leicester City on 16 June 1998. Taggart was often partnered with Steve Walsh and Matt Elliott in Leicester's defence. In 2000, he won a League Cup winners medal with Leicester.

He scored his last European goal in a 1–1 UEFA Cup draw against Red Star Belgrade on 15 September 2000, at Filbert Street. In the 2001–02 season Leicester were relegated from the Premier League and Taggart opted to remain with the "Foxes" and helped them regain their top-flight status. He was overlooked for the first team squad in the Premier League and joined Stoke City on loan then on a permanent basis.

=== Stoke City ===
Taggart joined Stoke City on loan on 9 December 2003. He instantly impressed Stoke manager Tony Pulis with his leadership qualities. His loan deal was extended for another month on 6 January 2004. But he was recalled by Leicester.

He joined Stoke on a permanent basis on 26 February 2004 until the end of the 2003–04. He then signed an extension at Stoke turning down an approach from Derby County. He formed a decent defensive partnership with Michael Duberry in the 2004–05 season Pulis was sacked at the end of it though and was replaced by Johan Boskamp. Boskamp used Taggart as a coach during his one season spell and he was not offered a new contract at the end of the season.

=== Tamworth ===
Taggart had spent the 2006–07 season back with his former club Leicester City to take his coaching badges. He signed for Conference North division side Tamworth on 16 May 2007. He played twice for the "Lambs" leaving to become assistant manager at Leicester.

== International career ==
Taggart played international football for Northern Ireland, making his debut in 1990 and spending 13 years at the back for Northern Ireland with his final appearance coming in 2003 while at Leicester. Taggart earned 51 caps for Northern Ireland, scoring seven goals. He retired from his Northern Ireland and international football career on 18 August 2003.

Taggart spent 21 months out of the team after he was dropped by Lawrie McMenemy in 1998. He was recalled by incoming manager Sammy McIlroy.

== Coaching career ==
Taggart returned to Leicester on 13 September 2007 as first team coach under Gary Megson. He and Frank Burrows became caretaker managers following Megson's departure to Bolton Wanderers on 25 October 2007.

Taggart left Leicester on 10 June 2010, when it was announced he would become the new assistant manager at Oldham Athletic alongside former Leicester teammate Paul Dickov. He was placed on garden leave by the club on 31 December 2012 following a run of poor results.

== After football ==
In July 2014, Taggart was appointed as a match summariser for Leicester City matches on BBC Radio Leicester during the pre-season, replacing the popular Leicester striker, Alan Young. He also appeared on the station's weekly Leicester City Football Forum talk show. Taggart's media career was brief; less than three weeks later he resigned from the role in order to take up the role as chief scout at Doncaster Rovers, but resigned in October 2015, following the sacking of Paul Dickov.

== Career statistics ==
=== Club ===
Appearances and goals by club, season and competition
Club	Season	League			FA Cup		League Cup		Other		Total	
Club	Season	Division	Apps	Goals	Apps	Goals	Apps	Goals	Apps	Goals	Apps	Goals
Manchester City	1988–89	Second Division	11	1	0	0	0	0	0	0	11	1
Manchester City	1989–90	First Division	1	0	0	0	0	0	1 (Note: Appearances in Full Members' Cup)	0	2	0
Manchester City	Total		12	1	0	0	0	0	1	0	13	1
Barnsley	1989–90	Second Division	21	2	4	1	0	0	0	0	25	3
Barnsley	1990–91	Second Division	30	2	2	0	4	0	2	0	38	2
Barnsley	1991–92	Second Division	38	3	0	0	3	0	1	0	42	3
Barnsley	1992–93	First Division	44	4	4	0	2	0	2 (Note: Appearances in Anglo-Italian Cup)	1	52	5
Barnsley	1993–94	First Division	38	2	4	1	2	0	1	0	45	3
Barnsley	1994–95	First Division	41	3	0	0	4	1	0	0	45	4
Barnsley	Total		212	16	14	2	15	1	6	1	247	20
Bolton Wanderers	1995–96	Premier League	11	1	2	0	2	0	—		15	1
Bolton Wanderers	1996–97	First Division	43	3	2	0	5	1	—		50	4
Bolton Wanderers	1997–98	Premier League	15	0	0	0	1	0	—		16	0
Bolton Wanderers	Total		69	4	4	0	8	1	—		81	5
Leicester City	1998–99	Premier League	15	0	2	0	6	1	—		23	1
Leicester City	1999–2000	Premier League	31	6	5	0	8	1	—		44	7
Leicester City	2000–01	Premier League	24	2	2	0	0	0	2 (Note: Appearances in UEFA Cup)	1	28	3
Leicester City	2001–02	Premier League	1	0	0	0	0	0	—		1	0
Leicester City	2002–03	First Division	37	1	0	0	0	0	—		37	1
Leicester City	2003–04	Premier League	9	0	0	0	0	0	—		9	0
Leicester City	Total		117	9	9	0	14	2	2	1	142	12
Stoke City	2003–04	First Division	21	2	0	0	0	0	—		21	2
Stoke City	2004–05	Championship	31	2	1	0	0	0	—		32	2
Stoke City	2005–06	Championship	3	1	0	0	0	0	—		3	1
Stoke City	Total		55	5	1	0	0	0	—		56	5
Tamworth	2007–08	Conference North	2	0	0	0	—		0	0	2	0
Career total			467	35	28	2	37	4	9	2	541	43

=== International ===
Appearances and goals by national team and year
National team	Year	Apps	Goals
Northern Ireland	1990	5	0
Northern Ireland	1991	5	3
Northern Ireland	1992	6	1
Northern Ireland	1993	8	1
Northern Ireland	1994	7	0
Northern Ireland	1995	4	0
Northern Ireland	1996	2	1
Northern Ireland	1997	7	0
Northern Ireland	1998	1	1
Northern Ireland	2000	4	0
Northern Ireland	2001	1	0
Northern Ireland	2002	1	0
Total		51	7

Scores and results list Northern Ireland's goal tally first, score column indicates score after each Taggart goal.

List of international goals scored by Gerry Taggart
No.	Date	Venue	Opponent	Score	Result	Competition
1	5 February 1991	Belfast, Northern Ireland	Poland	1–1	3–1	Friendly match
2	5 February 1991	Belfast, Northern Ireland	Poland	3–1	3–1	Friendly match
3	13 November 1991	Odense, Denmark	Denmark	1–2	1–2	UEFA Euro 1992 qualifying
4	28 April 1992	Belfast, Northern Ireland	Lithuania	2–0	2–2	1994 FIFA World Cup qualification
5	2 June 1993	Riga, Latvia	Latvia	2–0	2–1	1994 FIFA World Cup qualification
6	9 November 1996	Nuremberg, Germany	Germany	1–1	1–1	1998 FIFA World Cup qualification
7	3 June 1998	Santander, Spain	Spain	1–2	1–4	Friendly match

== Honours ==
Manchester City

- FA Youth Cup runner-up: 1988–89

Bolton Wanderers

- Football League First Division: 1996–97

Leicester City

- Football League Cup: 1999–2000; runner-up: 1998–99
- Football League First Division runner-up: 2002–03

Individual

- PFA Team of the Year: 1996–97 First Division
