= Mark Westhead =

English footballer and coach (born 1975)

Personal information
- Full name: Mark Lee Westhead
- Date of birth: 19 July 1975 (age 51)
- Place of birth: Blackpool, England
- Position: Goalkeeper

Senior career*
Years	Team	Apps	(Gls)
- Blackpool Mechanics
1992–1997	Bolton Wanderers	0	(0)
1997–1998	Sligo Rovers		
1998	Telford United	8	(0)
1998	Kidderminster Harriers	2	(0)
1998–2001	Wycombe Wanderers	4	(0)
2001–2002	Leigh RMI	33	(0)
2002–2004	Stevenage Borough	46	(0)
2004	Hyde United	5	(0)
200?	Droylsden		
2011–	Warrington Town		
- * Club domestic league appearances and goals

Mark Westhead (born 19 July 1975) is an English professional footballer. He is currently the Youth Department goalkeeping coach with Blackpool and is also playing for Warrington Town.

== Career ==
=== Playing career ===
Westhead started his career as a 17-year-old goalkeeper at Bolton Wanderers after initially being spotted whilst playing for non-League side Blackpool Mechanics. During his four years there Bolton were promoted from the Second Division to the Premier League but the nearest Westhead got to any playing time was as an unused substitute in a game against Wolverhampton Wanderers in 1994.

On his release from Bolton a brief spell in Ireland playing for Sligo Rovers in the League of Ireland. He returned to England to Telford United and then Kidderminster Harriers. Later that season good performances saw a return to League football with Wycombe Wanderers where the highlight of his three-year spell was reaching the FA Cup semi-final against Liverpool.

Westhead returned to his native North West with a year spell at Leigh RMI. He them moved to Stevenage Borough with whom he spent three years ending with a Play-off final defeat to Carlisle United. A spell at Hyde United was followed by a brief spell at Droylsden until a knee injury brought a premature end to his career. Mark Westhead is now a teacher at Blackpool and Fylde college where he teaches sport the bulb

He came out of retirement on 2 September 2011 to sign a playing contract with Warrington Town after they lost their goalkeeper David Stephenson.

=== Coaching career ===
Westhead is now a fully qualified coach and is currently the Youth Department goalkeeping coach at his hometown club, Blackpool.
