= Per Frandsen =

Danish football manager (born 1970)

Personal information
- Date of birth: 6 February 1970 (age 56)
- Place of birth: Copenhagen, Denmark
- Height: 1.84 m (6 ft 0 in)
- Position: Midfielder

Team information
- Current team: Odd (manager)

Youth career
- BK Skjold
- B 93

Senior career*
Years	Team	Apps	(Gls)
1988–1990	B 1903	25	(15)
1990–1994	Lille	109	(19)
1994–1996	Copenhagen	55	(19)
1996–1999	Bolton Wanderers	130	(17)
1999–2000	Blackburn Rovers	31	(5)
2000–2004	Bolton Wanderers	135	(13)
2004	Wigan Athletic	9	(1)
Total		494	(89)

International career
1989–1992	Denmark u-21	21	(8)
1990–2003	Denmark	23	(0)

Managerial career
- 2009–2012: HB Køge (assistant)
- 2012–2014: HB Køge
- 2014–2015: Brøndby U19
- 2015–2016: AB
- 2017–2025: Hvidovre
- 2025–: Odd
- * Club domestic league appearances and goals

Per Frandsen (Danish pronunciation: [ˈpeːɐ̯ ˈfʁan.sn̩]; born 6 February 1970) is a Danish professional football manager and former player who is currently the head coach of Odd in the Norwegian second tier.

Most notably, he won the 1994–95 Danish Cup with Copenhagen, and played 265 league games as a midfielder for Bolton Wanderers in England. Frandsen gained 23 caps for the Denmark national team between 1990 and 2003, and represented his country at the 1992 Summer Olympics and 1998 FIFA World Cup tournaments.

== Biography ==
Born in Copenhagen, Frandsen started playing football with local clubs BK Skjold and B 93. He made his senior debut with top-flight club B 1903, debuted for the Danish under-21 national team in April 1989. He was the third best goalscorer of the 1990 Danish 1st Division, and made his national team debut in May 1990. He played three national team games under national manager Richard Møller Nielsen, until his national team career went on a hiatus in September 1991. In November 1990, he was sold to French club Lille, in a club record transfer deal.

Frandsen joined fellow Danish international Jakob Friis-Hansen at Lille, and played four years at the club. While at Lille, he represented Denmark at the 1992 Summer Olympics, where he played full-time in Denmark's three games before elimination. When Lille faced economical difficulties in the summer 1994, Frandsen returned home to Denmark to play for Copenhagen (FCK). Frandsen stated his intention to only play in Denmark temporarily, and having won the 1995 Danish Cup with FCK, he moved abroad once again in August 1996. He was sold to English club Bolton Wanderers for £1.25 million. Playing in the second tier of English football, he made his debut for the club in a 1–1 draw at Port Vale before scoring his first goal for Bolton in the following game against Manchester City.

He soon earned a reputation as one of the best players in English football playing outside the top-flight FA Premier League championship, and it was assumed that it would only be a matter of time before one of the bigger clubs came in for him. Instead, he helped Bolton win promotion back to the Premier League in the 1996–97 season. Frandsen's national team career was revived in November 1996, when he was recalled by new national manager Bo Johansson, after more than five years of absence from the Danish national team. He was one of the few bright spots of Bolton's second Premier League campaign, which ended in swift relegation back into the Football League. He was included in the Danish squad for the 1998 FIFA World Cup, where he was used as a substitute in two games.

In September 1999, Frandsen joined Bolton's league rivals Blackburn Rovers for £1.75 million. The decision was against the wishes of Bolton manager Colin Todd, who subsequently resigned. Frandsen's stay at Ewood Park for Blackburn was far from happy. He failed to settle at the club, and at the end of the season he returned to Bolton for £1.6 million. In his final year at Bolton, the club reached the 2004 League Cup final, though they were beaten 2–1 by Middlesbrough. He played 304 first team games for the club in all competitions, scoring 38 goals in the process. Frandsen left Bolton Wanderers to join Wigan Athletic on a free transfer in June 2004, helping them get promoted to the Premiership, scoring once in the process against Brighton. After playing well in his first time at the club, he received a severe cruciate ligament injury and he decided to retire in January 2005.

After his retirement Frandsen worked as a football agent in Denmark, until he was named new assistant manager at HB Køge in June 2009.

Following the sacking of Tommy Møller Nielsen in the autumn of 2012, he was promoted to manager of the club. He managed the club until June 2014, when he was hired as youth coach of Brøndby.

On 22 June 2015, Frandsen was appointed as the new manager of AB. In his first season, he led the club to promotion to the Danish 1st Division. His second season, however, saw the club struggling and, in December 2016, he was sacked, with the club in bottom place in the league.

On 18 June 2017, he was named new manager of Hvidovre in the Danish 2nd Divisions. During his time at the club, he managed to lead them from the third tier to promotion to the Danish Superliga in 2023. After eight years as Hvidovre manager, it was confirmed on 8 May 2025 that Frandsen would leave the club at the end of the season.

== Honours ==
=== Player ===
Copenhagen

- Danish Cup: 1994–95
- Danish Super Cup: 1995

Bolton Wanderers

- Football League First Division: 1996–97; play-offs: 2001
- Football League Cup runner-up: 2003–04

Wigan Athletic

- Football League Championship second-place promotion: 2004–05

Individual

- PFA Team of the Year: 1998–99 First Division

=== Manager ===
Individual

- Norwegian First Division Coach of the Month: April 2026
