= Fabian de Freitas =

Surinamese footballer (born 1972)

Personal information
- Full name: Fabian Zanzibar de Freitas
- Date of birth: July 28, 1972 (age 54)
- Place of birth: Paramaribo, Suriname
- Height: 6 ft 1 in (1.85 m)
- Position: Striker

Youth career
- WMS
- Blauw-Wit

Senior career*
| Years | Team | Apps | (Gls) |
| 1990–1994 | Volendam | 77 | (10) |
| 1994–1996 | Bolton Wanderers | 40 | (7) |
| 1996–1998 | Osasuna | 48 | (11) |
| 1998–2000 | West Bromwich Albion | 61 | (8) |
| 2000–2001 | Cambuur | 24 | (14) |
| 2001–2002 | Den Bosch | 32 | (8) |
| 2003–2004 | NEC | 19 | (3) |
| Total | | 301 | (61) |

International career
| 1992 | Netherlands U21 | 1 | (0) |
- * Club domestic league appearances and goals

Fabian de Freitas (born 28 July 1972) is a Dutch retired footballer who played as a striker.

He notably played in the Premier League for Bolton Wanderers and in La Liga for CA Osasuna. He also played in the Football League for West Bromwich Albion and in his native country for FC Volendam, SC Cambuur, FC Den Bosch and NEC.

== Playing career ==
Fabian de Freitas is probably best known for his late goals in the 1995 Division 1 Play-off final between Bolton Wanderers and Reading at Wembley which finished 4–3 to Bolton. Wanderers found themselves 2-0 down (although goalkeeper Keith Branagan saved a penalty in the first half to prevent Reading going 3-0 up) with 15 minutes to go before Owen Coyle pulled one back. De Freitas' goal in the 86th minute forced the game into extra-time, before Mixu Paatelainen headed Bolton in the lead. De Freitas then added the winner, firing in from close-range, with a minute to go, promoting Bolton to the Premier League, though Reading responded with a last gasp consolation goal which made the scoreline 4–3.

He made his Albion debut on 22 August 1998 in a 3–0 away win at Port Vale; in the 87th minute he replaced Lee Hughes, who had scored a hat-trick in the game.

He missed a home match against Crewe Alexandra on 5 April 1999 which West Bromwich Albion lost 5-1 due to a misunderstanding over the fact he thought the game was an evening kick-off. The club got through to him by phone at 2.20 PM and he arrived at The Hawthorns just before the 3.00 PM kick-off and by then the team sheet had already been handed in.

De Freitas played once for the Netherlands national under-21 football team.

== Personal life ==
De Freitas now lives in Belgium and works in property.

== Honours ==
Bolton Wanderers

- Football League First Division play-offs: 1995
