= Jamie Pollock =

English footballer (born 1974)

Personal information
- Date of birth: 16 February 1974 (age 52)
- Place of birth: Stockton-on-Tees, England
- Position: Defensive midfielder

Senior career*
Years	Team	Apps	(Gls)
1990–1996	Middlesbrough	155	(18)
1996	Osasuna	2	(0)
1996–1998	Bolton Wanderers	52	(5)
1998–2000	Manchester City	60	(5)
2000–2002	Crystal Palace	31	(4)
2001	→ Birmingham City (loan)	5	(0)
Total		305	(32)

International career
1992–1993	England U19	8	(0)
1994–1995	England U21	3	(0)

Managerial career
- 2003–2005: Spennymoor United
- 2005–2007: Spennymoor Town
- 2018–2019: Billingham Synthonia
- * Club domestic league appearances and goals

Jamie Pollock (born 16 February 1974) is an English former football club chairman, manager and professional player. As a player he was a midfielder from 1990 to 2002. He played Premier League football for Middlesbrough, Bolton Wanderers and Manchester City. He also made more than 300 appearances in the Football League also appearing for Crystal Palace and Birmingham City as well as a short spell in La Liga with CA Osasuna. From 2003 to 2007 he managed both Spennymoor United and Spennymoor Town.

== Playing career ==
His career began at Middlesbrough where he played as a defensive midfielder. He left Middlesbrough in 1996 joining Spanish side CA Osasuna. After failing to make an impression in Spain he returned to England, signing for Bolton Wanderers. He later played for Manchester City, a team which then fell into what was then Division Two. Pollock scored an own goal in the penultimate game of the season, against Queens Park Rangers, where he flicked the ball over an opposing player before sending a looping header over his own goalkeeper. The own goal condemned Manchester City to relegation to the third tier for the first time, whilst keeping QPR in the division. As a result, a group of QPR fans thanked him by voting him the "most influential man of the past 2,000 years" in an internet poll, where "Jesus came second, apparently." Speaking to The Athletic in 2021, Pollock said "When something of that nature happens, quite often people rally around and support you. The Manchester City fans were brilliant. They have a good sense of humour. I was expecting a lot of abuse but it never came." He added that people regularly still spoke to him about his infamous own goal with Pollock also saying "It's always a good icebreaker. When I'm coaching young kids, someone will come up to me, or I'll tell them to watch it. It's funny to laugh at now. There was a time when I couldn't watch it. But it's done and dusted now."

He was transferred to Crystal Palace and later spent a spell on loan to Birmingham City. On 1 March 2002, Pollock announced his retirement from professional football. He had been without a club since he left Crystal Palace by mutual consent. He was training with Grimsby Town but opted instead to play non-League football and become a director in his family's glass-making business.

== Managerial career ==
Pollock was the manager of non-League club Spennymoor Town until 2007, after his previous club Spennymoor United folded in 2005. His Spennymoor side won the Northern League Division 2 title in 2007. He also coaches a Polton Allstars team that plays in the Teesside Junior Alliance – North Riding League.

Pollock took over as Billingham Synthonia manager at the start of the 2018–19 season. Synthonia finished 10th at the end of season. He stepped down as manager in August 2019 to focus more on his chairman role. In 2019 he set up Billingham Synthonia Football Academy. He stepped down as chairman of the club in July 2021.

== Personal life ==
His sons Ben and Mattie also became professional footballers.

== Honours ==
=== As a player ===
Middlesbrough

- Football League First Division: 1994–95

Bolton Wanderers

- Football League First Division: 1996–97

Individual

- PFA Team of the Year: 1994–95 First Division

=== As a manager ===
Spennymoor Town

- Northern League Division Two: 2006–07
