= Scott Sellars =

English footballer and coach (born 1965)

Personal information
- Full name: Scott Sellars
- Date of birth: 27 November 1965 (age 60)
- Place of birth: Sheffield, England
- Height: 5 ft 8 in (1.73 m)
- Position: Left midfielder

Senior career*
| Years | Team | Apps | (Gls) |
| 1983–1986 | Leeds United | 76 | (12) |
| 1986–1992 | Blackburn Rovers | 202 | (35) |
| 1992–1993 | Leeds United | 7 | (0) |
| 1993–1995 | Newcastle United | 75 | (8) |
| 1995–1999 | Bolton Wanderers | 111 | (15) |
| 1999–2001 | Huddersfield Town | 48 | (17) |
| 2001 | AGF Aarhus | 20 | (1) |
| 2002–2003 | Mansfield Town | 20 | (3) |
| Total | | 545 | (72) |

International career
| 1988 | England U21 | 3 | (0) |

Managerial career
- 2014–2018: Wolverhampton Wanderers U23
- * Club domestic league appearances and goals

Scott Sellars (born 27 November 1965) is an English football coach and former professional footballer who was most recently technical director at Wolverhampton Wanderers.

As a player, he was a winger who made more than 500 appearances, notably playing in the Premier League with Leeds United, Newcastle United and Bolton Wanderers. He also played football with Blackburn Rovers, in Denmark with AGF Aarhus and in the Football League with Huddersfield Town and Mansfield Town. He was capped three times at England at under-21 level.

Since retirement he has previously been assistant manager at Chesterfield and academy coach at Manchester City. He has also worked as the head coach of Wolverhampton Wanderers U23s, as well as assistant head coach under caretaker manager Rob Edwards for Wolves' first team. He is the ex-technical director at Wolverhampton Wanderers.

== Playing career ==
After starting his career at Leeds United, Sellars established himself in the Second Division with Blackburn Rovers where he spent six years. After three play-off heartbreaks, Sellars finally found success in the 1991–92 Play-off Final which earned Rovers promotion to the newly formed Premier League. However, that would prove to be his last match for Rovers as he joined his former club Leeds who had just won the First Division.

He later joined Newcastle United. On 24 April 1993 he scored the winning goal for Newcastle in their 1–0 win over local rivals Sunderland in Division One at St James's Park, which meant that they only needed a point from their final three games to be sure of promotion.

== Coaching career ==
Sellars joined Manchester City as Academy coach in October 2009 after previously holding the role of assistant manager at Chesterfield in the League Two and U18s coach at Sheffield United in 2004–05. He was dismissed on 11 April 2014 after a "difference of footballing opinion with the current regime" and fears over the club's homegrown quota.

In July 2014 he was appointed to the coaching staff at Wolverhampton Wanderers FC.

In March 2019 Sellars applied for, and was appointed to, the post of Head of Academy at Wolverhampton Wanderers FC, succeeding Gareth Prosser in the role.

== Personal life ==
His son is Conor Sellars. He has another son, named Jude Charles Sellars who is a successful actor in Manchester.

In January 2013, Sellars pleaded guilty to causing death by careless driving. Sellars had been driving home from work after returning from Dubai, where he had been coaching Manchester City's youth team, when he crashed his car and killed a motorcyclist. Sellars received a six-month suspended sentence and was ordered to do 300 hours of community service.

He is a graduate of Manchester Metropolitan University's Masters of Sport Directorship programme.

== Honours ==
Blackburn Rovers

- Football League Second Division play-offs: 1992
- Full Members' Cup: 1986–87

Bolton Wanderers

- Football League First Division: 1996–97

Individual

- PFA Team of the Year: 1989–90 Second Division, 1991–92 Second Division
