= Bryan Small =

English footballer

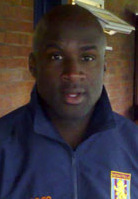
- Small in 2007

Personal information
- Full name: Bryan Small
- Date of birth: 15 November 1971 (age 54)
- Place of birth: Birmingham, England
- Height: 5 ft 9 in (1.75 m)
- Position: Defender

Youth career
- Aston Villa

Senior career*
Years	Team	Apps	(Gls)
1990–1996	Aston Villa	35	(0)
1994	→ Birmingham City (loan)	3	(0)
1996–1998	Bolton Wanderers	17	(0)
1997	→ Luton Town (loan)	16	(0)
1997–1998	→ Bradford City (loan)	5	(0)
1998	→ Bury (loan)	8	(0)
1998	→ Bury (loan)	10	(1)
1998–2001	Stoke City	45	(0)
2001	Walsall	0	(0)
2001	→ Forest Green Rovers (loan)	5	(0)
2001–2002	Kettering Town	7	(0)
2002–2003	Hednesford Town	20	(0)
Total		171	(1)

International career
1993	England U21	12	(0)
- * Club domestic league appearances and goals

Bryan Small (born 15 November 1971) is an English former professional footballer who played as a defender.

He started out as a trainee at his hometown club Aston Villa and played for a total of 11 clubs in a series of free transfers and loan deals. Small played for Birmingham City, Bolton Wanderers, Luton Town, Bradford City, Bury, Stoke City and Walsall. At international level he was capped 12 times for the England under-21 team.

== Playing career ==
Small was born in Birmingham and began his career as a trainee at Aston Villa making his debut away at Everton in 1991–92. He played in 13 matches that season and made 15 appearances in 1992–93.

In 1993–94 Small played 12 times for Villa including two against Deportivo de La Coruña in the UEFA Cup. In the 1994–95 season he played five matches for Villa and had a loan spell at second city rivals Birmingham City where he played three times.

He left Villa in March 1996 for Bolton Wanderers where he made 16 appearances helping the club win the First Division in 1996–97. Small was unable to force his way into the team in the Premier League and spent time out on loan at Luton Town, Bradford City and Bury. At Bury he scored his only goal of his career against Sunderland.

In the summer 1998 Small moved to Stoke City where he made 43 appearances in 1998–99 as Stoke failed to claim a play-off place. In 1999–2000 he made nine appearances before being released in the summer of 2000. Following his release from Stoke Small had unsuccessful trials at Carlisle United and Brentford.

Another free transfer followed to Walsall but he failed to make the first team. After a loan spell at Forest Green Rovers he moved to Kettering Town before he finished his career at Hednesford Town.

== Later career ==
Small began his coaching career with Stourport Swifts and in July 2008 turned out for old club Bolton in the Masters Tournament.

== Personal life ==
Small's nephew, Thierry Small, became Everton's youngest first-team debutant when he made a brief appearance in the FA Cup as a 16-year-old in early 2021, and turned professional later that year with Southampton.

== Career statistics ==
Appearances and goals by club, season and competition
Club	Season	League			FA Cup		League Cup		Other (Note: Appearances in the Football League Trophy, Full Members Cup and UEFA Champions League)		Total	
Club	Season	Division	Apps	Goals	Apps	Goals	Apps	Goals	Apps	Goals	Apps	Goals
Aston Villa	1991–92	First Division	8	0	3	0	0	0	2	0	13	0
Aston Villa	1992–93	Premier League	14	0	0	0	1	0	0	0	15	0
Aston Villa	1993–94	Premier League	9	0	0	0	1	0	2	0	12	0
Aston Villa	1994–95	Premier League	5	0	0	0	0	0	0	0	5	0
Aston Villa	Total		36	0	3	0	2	0	4	0	45	0
Birmingham City (loan)	1994–95	Second Division	3	0	0	0	0	0	0	0	3	0
Bolton Wanderers	1995–96	Premier League	1	0	0	0	0	0	0	0	1	0
Bolton Wanderers	1996–97	First Division	11	0	3	0	1	0	0	0	15	0
Bolton Wanderers	Total		12	0	3	0	1	0	0	0	16	0
Luton Town (loan)	1997–98	Second Division	15	0	0	0	0	0	0	0	15	0
Bradford City (loan)	1997–98	First Division	5	0	0	0	0	0	0	0	5	0
Bury	1997–98	First Division	18	1	0	0	0	0	0	0	18	1
Stoke City	1998–99	Second Division	37	0	2	0	2	0	2	0	43	0
Stoke City	1999–2000	Second Division	8	0	0	0	1	0	0	0	9	0
Stoke City	Total		45	0	2	0	3	0	2	0	52	0
Walsall	2000–01	Second Division	0	0	0	0	0	0	2	0	2	0
Forest Green Rovers (loan)	2001–02	Football Conference	5	0	0	0	0	0	0	0	5	0
Kettering Town	2002–03	Football Conference	7	0	0	0	0	0	0	0	7	0
Career total			146	1	8	0	6	0	8	0	168	1

== Honours ==
Bolton Wanderers

- Football League First Division: 1996–97
