= Nathan Blake =

Welsh footballer

Personal information
- Full name: Nathan Alexander Blake
- Date of birth: 27 January 1972 (age 54)
- Place of birth: Cardiff, Wales
- Position: Forward

Youth career
- 1988–1990: Chelsea

Senior career*
Years	Team	Apps	(Gls)
1990–1994	Cardiff City	131	(35)
1994–1995	Sheffield United	69	(34)
1995–1998	Bolton Wanderers	107	(38)
1998–2001	Blackburn Rovers	55	(13)
2001–2004	Wolverhampton Wanderers	75	(24)
2004–2005	Leicester City	14	(0)
2005	→ Leeds United (loan)	2	(1)
2006	Newport County	5	(1)
Total		458	(145)

International career
1991–1993	Wales U21	5	(4)
1991	Wales B	1	(0)
1994–2003	Wales	29	(4)
- * Club domestic league appearances and goals

Nathan Blake (born 27 January 1972) is a Welsh former professional footballer, pundit and television presenter.

He notably played in the Premier League for Sheffield United, Bolton Wanderers, Blackburn Rovers and Wolverhampton Wanderers. He also played in the Football League for Cardiff City, Leicester City and Leeds United before retiring with non-league side Newport County. He was capped 30 times by Wales, scoring four goals. He has previously been capped at U21 and B team level. He was relegated from the Premier League on a joint record of five occasions (with Hermann Hreiðarsson). Blake is also one of the most promoted players to the Premier League with three promotions.

Following retirement, Blake has worked for Wales Online reporting on Cardiff City, BBC Wales, BBC 5 Live, and Sky Sports. In October 2020 he presented a programme on BBC Wales titled Wales' Black Miners.

== Early life ==
Blake was born in Cardiff and grew up nearby on the Ringland estate in Newport, Wales. Blake was raised by his mother, aunt, and grandmother, and his cousins Matthew Robinson, a Wales rugby union international and Anthony Sullivan, a dual code rugby international. His uncle Clive Sullivan was a rugby league international. Blake attended Milton Primary School and Hartridge High School.

== Club career ==
=== Cardiff City ===
Blake was a trainee at Chelsea but was released in 1990, without graduating to the first team. He told WalesOnline in 2020 how, despite his upbringing showing "99% of people from the estate [having] no fear", he saw racism "like no other time in my life" at Chelsea. The club have since been accused of ignoring the racist abuse of coaches Graham Rix and Gwyn Williams.

He moved back to his home-city club Cardiff City after this, where he quickly made his senior debut against Bristol Rovers in March. He quickly rose to being a first team regular in 1990–91 and went on to become a firm favourite with fans.

He helped the club to the Third Division title in 1992–93, scoring 11 times, and made a strong start to life in the third tier the next season, scoring 14 goals in 20 games. It was during this season that he rose to national prominence when he scored a spectacular goal against Manchester City to send them crashing out of the FA Cup. This form attracted Premier League Sheffield United to snap him up for £300,000 in February 1994. In total, he scored 40 goals in 164 appearances for the Welsh side.

=== Sheffield United ===
Blake scored five goals in the remainder of Sheffield United's top flight campaign, but could not halt relegation. He then finished as the Blades' top scorer in the next two seasons, but neither season saw the club mount a serious promotion challenge in Division One. During the 1995–96 season, his goalscoring again won him a move to the Premier League, as he joined Bolton Wanderers in December 1995 in a £1,200,000 deal.

=== Bolton Wanderers ===
Blake failed to make an immediate impact at Bolton Wanderers and only managed one league goal as they dropped out of the Premier League after a solitary season. He rediscovered his goalscoring prowess in the 1996–97 season though, as he notched 19 league goals to fire Bolton back to the top flight as champions. The next season saw his best seasonal tally in the top flight as he bagged 12 goals, however this couldn't prevent yet another relegation for the club after one season.

=== Blackburn Rovers ===
He started the 1998–99 season brightly, with six goals in the opening 12 games, which won him his third move back to the Premier League with Blackburn Rovers in a £4.25 million deal in October 1998. History repeated itself though for Blake as he again suffered the drop in a season that saw him manage just three goals.

The striker remained at Ewood Park for two full seasons, the second of which saw him again win promotion, but he managed only nine goals over these seasons. He started the club's return in the top flight, and scored their opening goal away at Derby County, but was swiftly returned to Division One when he was sold to Wolverhampton Wanderers in September 2001 for an initial £1.5 million fee. Blake, who had a strained relationship with Blackburn manager Graeme Souness, was offered the chance to stay and fight for a place in the side but decided to accept the transfer.

=== Wolverhampton Wanderers ===
Blake quickly refound his form at First Division Wolves, scoring on his debut against Stockport County, and ending the season with 11 goals. However, he missed out on another promotion as the club suffered a late slump to fall into the play-offs where they lost to Norwich City. The next season saw Blake better his tally, despite suffering a broken foot during a match against Portsmouth in November 2002, as his 12 goals helped the club go one step further as they won the play-offs. Blake himself scored in the 3–0 final win over his former club Sheffield United, held at the Millennium Stadium in his birth city of Cardiff.

His final crack at the Premier League was hindered by a year of niggling injuries that kept him sidelined for the majority of the games. He managed just one goal, against Newcastle United, from 13 appearances as the club proved unable to survive. This relegation gave Blake the unenviable distinction of the player suffering the most Premier League relegations with five different seasons ending in the drop, a record that has since been matched by Hermann Hreiðarsson.

Blake left the club in acrimonious circumstances, having fallen out of favour, Blake fell out with manager Dave Jones after a proposed move to Portsmouth fell through when Wolves continually raised their asking price for Blake before eventually cancelling the deal.

=== Leicester City ===
Blake was released by Wolves upon their relegation in 2004, after making 85 appearances, scoring 26 times in all competitions. He joined fellow relegated club Leicester City on a one-year contract after having also had a trial at Sunderland. His opportunities here were mostly only as a substitute and he never scored a league goal for the Foxes, but did score once in a League Cup defeat to Preston North End. Failing to make an impact, he was instead loaned out to Leeds United in January 2005, where he managed the final goal of his league career against Coventry City. His loan was cut short by a ruptured hamstring and he returned to Leicester, but did not feature again before being released by the club in June 2005.

=== Newport County ===
His professional career derailed as he was given a six-month suspension in August 2005 for testing positive for a recreational drug. After serving his suspension, he had a trial at Stoke City but decided he was unwilling to commit to playing full-time anymore. Instead, he spent two months playing for non-league Newport County, where he had originally been a trainee, before his deal ended in October 2006.

== International career ==
Born in Wales and of Jamaican descent, Blake won 29 caps for Wales, scoring four times. He made his debut on 9 March 1994 in a 3–1 friendly loss to Norway, which marked the only game of John Toshack's first spell in charge. He scored his first goal against Moldova in a 3–1 Euro 96 qualifying defeat. Blake refused to play for Wales team manager Bobby Gould after accusing Gould of making a racist comment in training. His other three international goals came against Turkey (August 1997), Norway (October 2000) and Poland (June 2001). He also set the unfortunate record of being the first Welsh player to score an international goal at Wales' Millennium Stadium when he put through his own net against Finland on 29 March 2000.

He announced his retirement in September 2004, ten months after playing his final match in the Euro 2004 play-off loss to Russia.

== Outside football ==
On 27 January 2012, following several race related scandals in the English game, Blake came out to say whilst he was a player he was sent a racially motivated death threat after withdrawing from a Wales squad.

Blake won the award for Best Supporting Actor at Film Fest Cymru 2014 for his role in short film The Homing Bird, in which he plays a football coach. He had been nominated the previous year in the same category for his debut role in Say It.

In 2014 Blake graduated from the FA-funded Corporate Governance course On Board, aimed at getting more ex-professionals and more diverse backgrounds represented on football boards. In 2015 Blake returned to Newport County for five months as a non-executive Director advising on football decisions, including the appointment of a permanent successor to Justin Edinburgh. He remained at the club until the Supporters Trust took control of the club later in the year. Later that year he became chairman of County in the Community.

Blake has been a bit of a figure on the issue of race in football. In May 2020 he voiced his support for footballers Troy Deeney, Raheem Sterling, and Danny Rose who all expressed reluctance to return to training due to the disproportionate threat of COVID-19 to their families. In October 2020, Blake criticised former club Newport County for not taking the knee in their League Two fixture against Tranmere Rovers, despite the town having "probably one of the biggest black populations in Great Britain". County Chairman Gavin Foxall responded by clarifying he thought it had been a decision for "the referee [...] agreed with the two captains", but that the "club is fully behind the campaign".

Blake has worked for Wales Online reporting on Cardiff City, BBC Wales, BBC 5 Live, and Sky Sports. In October 2020 he presented a programme on BBC Wales titled Wales' Black Miners.

== Personal life ==
Blake grew up in the "tough" neighbourhood of Ringland in Newport. He nevertheless states he "would choose my upbringing 100 times out of 100 - it was amazing". He noted the existence of racism in his childhood, such as being called a "n*****" at the age of seven, and not being considered academically capable at school, but praised the community spirit among those growing up on the estate. Before breaking through as a footballer, Blake fell foul of the law and was prosecuted for theft from a fruit machine in London.

Following his retirement from professional football in 2006, he set up and runs his own property management company in his native Wales. He is also involved in a football agency and has three children.

== Honours ==
Cardiff City

- Football League Third Division: 1992–93
- Welsh Cup: 1990–91, 1991–92

Bolton Wanderers

- Football League First Division: 1996–97

Blackburn Rovers

- Football League First Division runner-up: 2000–01

Wolverhampton Wanderers

- Football League First Division play-offs: 2003
