= Keith Branagan =

Irish-English footballer (born 1966)

Personal information
- Full name: Keith Graham Branagan
- Date of birth: 10 July 1966 (age 60)
- Place of birth: Fulham, England
- Height: 6 ft 0 in (1.83 m)
- Position: Goalkeeper

Senior career*
Years	Team	Apps	(Gls)
1983–1988	Cambridge United	110	(0)
1988–1992	Millwall	46	(0)
1989	→ Brentford (loan)	2	(0)
1991	→ Gillingham (loan)	1	(0)
1992–2000	Bolton Wanderers	214	(0)
2000–2002	Ipswich Town	3	(0)
Total		376	(0)

International career
1997	Republic of Ireland	1	(0)
- * Club domestic league appearances and goals

Keith Graham Branagan (born 10 July 1966) is a football coach and former professional player.

As a player, he was a goalkeeper who notably played in the Premier League for Bolton Wanderers and Ipswich Town. He also played in the Football League for Cambridge United, Millwall, Brentford and Gillingham. Born in England, he won a single cap for the Republic of Ireland at international level in 1997.

== Club career ==
Branagan played for a number of clubs in his career. He began his career at Cambridge United, and later joined Millwall. However, his most successful years were spent at Bolton Wanderers, where he experienced three promotions, played two seasons in the Premier League and played at Wembley in the 1995 League Cup final. After eight years at Bolton, Branagan joined Ipswich Town in 2000.

He was forced to retire from the game in October 2002 following a nine-month battle against a shoulder injury. Branagan has remained in the game following retirement; he now has a UEFA 'A' Coaching licence and has coached the goalkeepers at Crewe Alexandra and Stockport County before taking up a coaching role at Bolton School. He is still there as a football coach.

== International career ==
At international level, Branagan won one full cap for the Republic of Ireland. His only senior cap came on 11 February 1997, in the 0–0 draw against Wales at The National Stadium, Cardiff. Branagan also played a couple of matches for the Republic of Ireland B team.

== Coaching career ==
He became a part-time youth goalkeeping coach for Bolton Wanderers on 28 March 2012.

== Personal life ==
His son Ritchie Branagan is also a goalkeeper and has played professionally for Bury and Macclesfield Town.

== Honours ==
Bolton Wanderers

- Football League First Division: 1996–97; play-offs: 1995
- Football League Cup runner-up: 1994–95

Ipswich Town

- Football League First Division play-offs: 2000

== See also ==
- List of Republic of Ireland international footballers born outside the Republic of Ireland
