= List of Bolton Wanderers F.C. players (1–24 appearances) =

Bolton Wanderers F.C. is an English association football club based in Lostock, Greater Manchester. The club was formed in Bolton in 1874 as Christ Church F.C., and played their first competitive match in October 1881, when they entered the First Round of the 1881–82 FA Cup. The club was renamed Bolton Wanderers F.C. in 1877, and they moved to Burnden Park in 1895 and the Reebok Stadium in 1997. The club won its first significant trophy in 1923 by beating West Ham United in the first FA Cup Final to be played at Wembley Stadium. Over the next forty years the club won a further three FA Cups. The club has gained promotion to the Premier League one three separate occasions; first in 1995, then again in 1997, with each term lasting for only one season on each occasion, before again gaining promotion in 2001. The club played at the highest level in English football for eleven years before relegation to the second tier in 2012.

Since playing their first competitive match, more than 1,050 players have made a competitive first-team appearance for the club, many of whom have played less than 25 matches (including substitute appearances).

As of November 2026, a total of 627 players have played fewer than 25 competitive matches for the club. Seven former players – C.E. Harrison, Tom Wilson, Bob Hatton, David Cross, Nicky Southall, Kaiyne Woolery and Shaun Miller – each made 24 appearances during their spell at Bolton Wanderers. Max Lott is the most recent player to have made their debut for the club.

== List of players ==
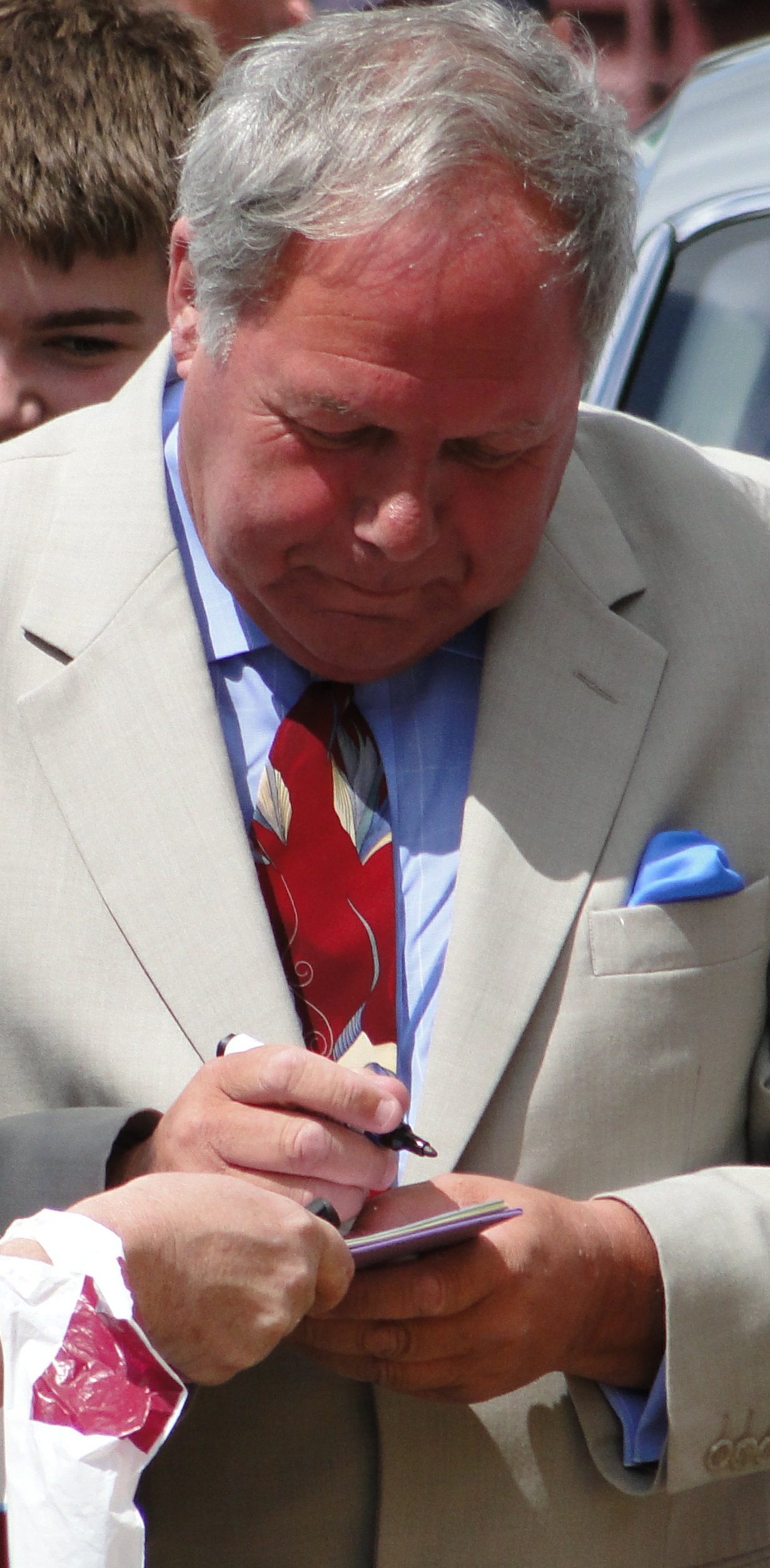
Barry Fry

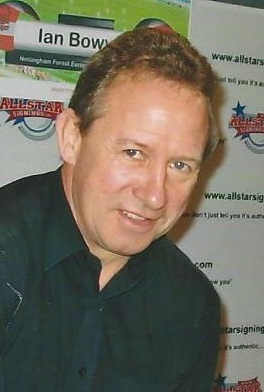
John McGovern

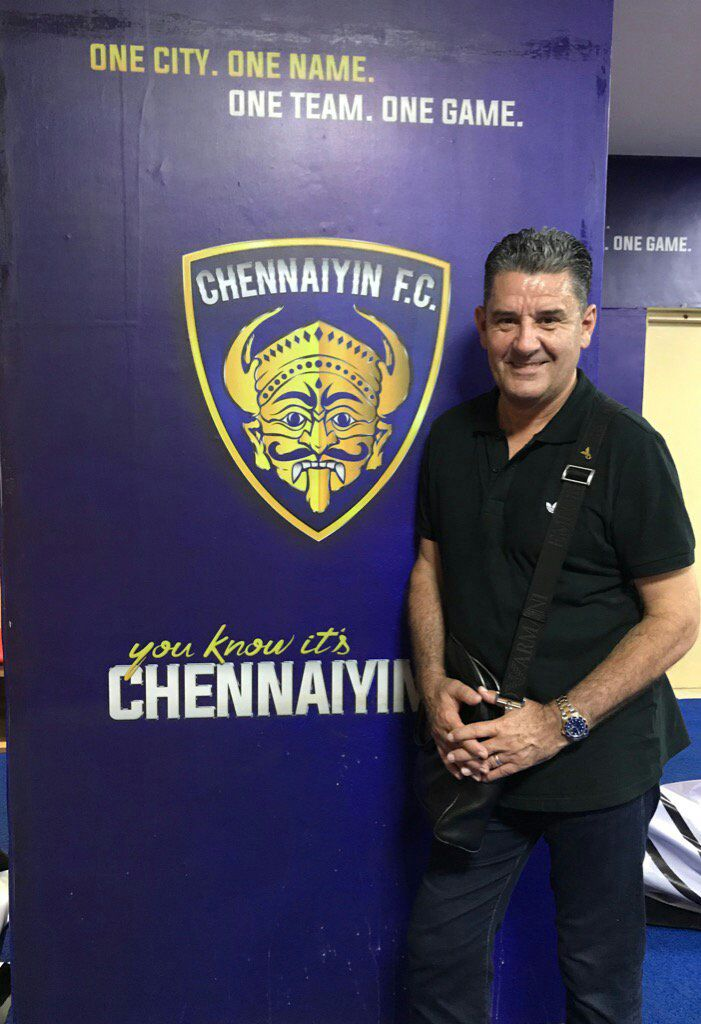
John Gregory

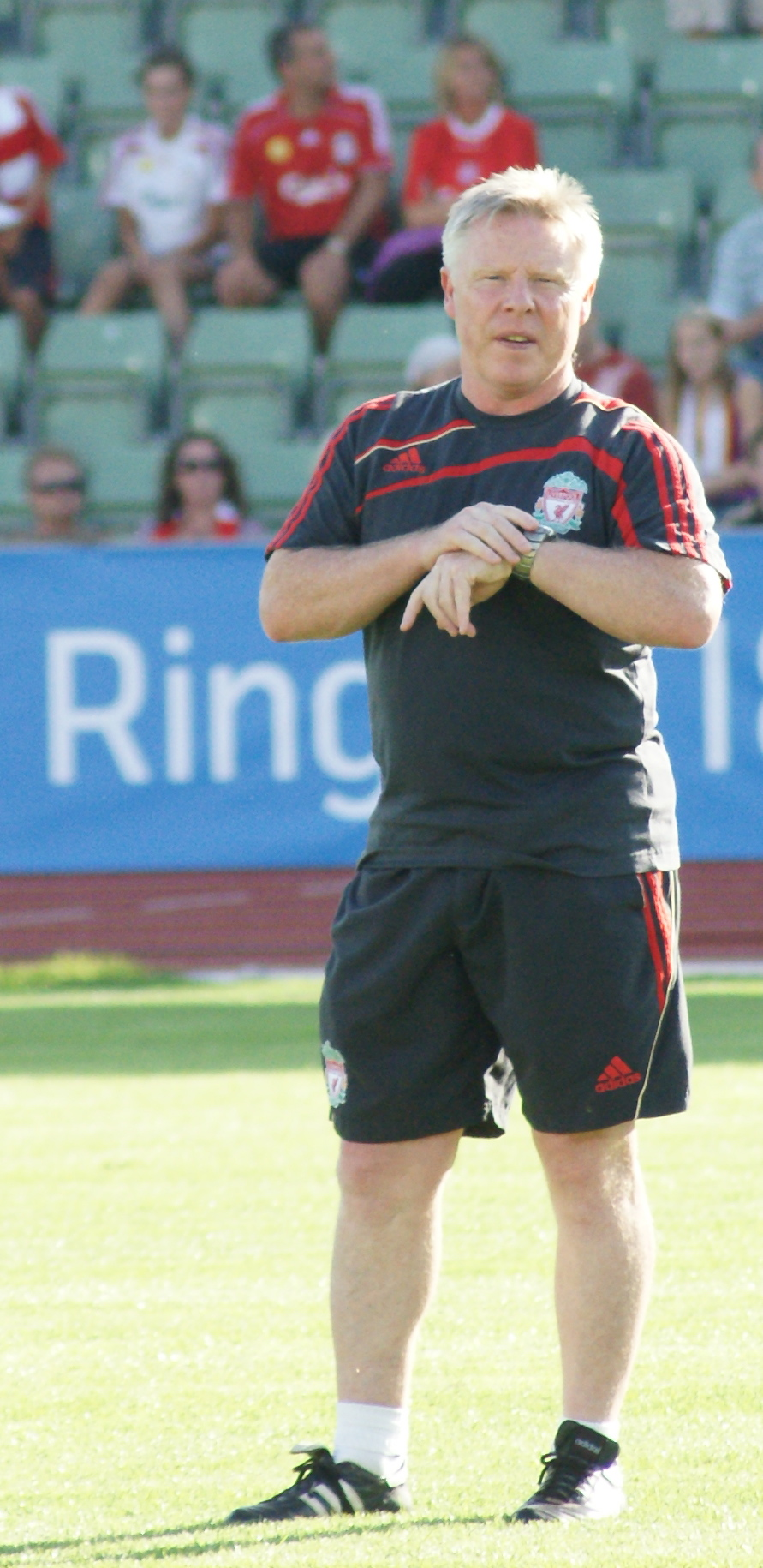
Sammy Lee

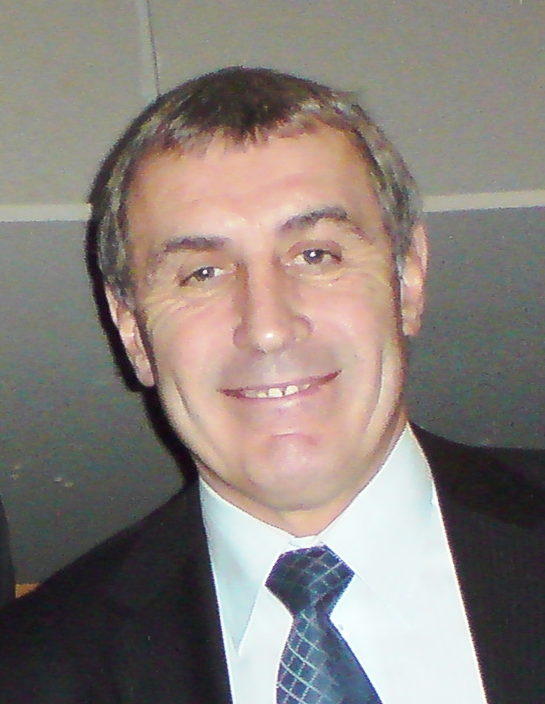
Peter Shilton

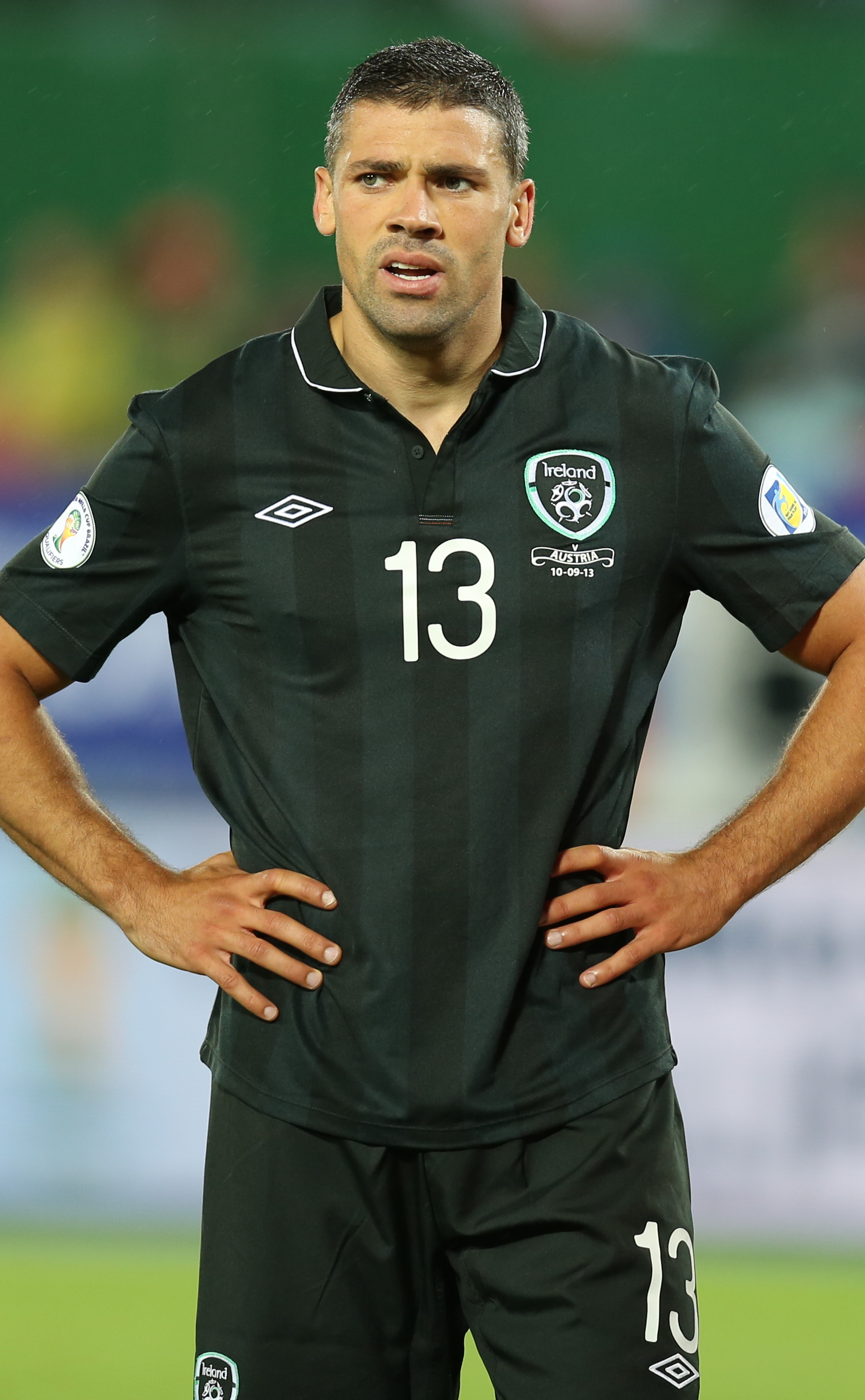
Jonathan Walters

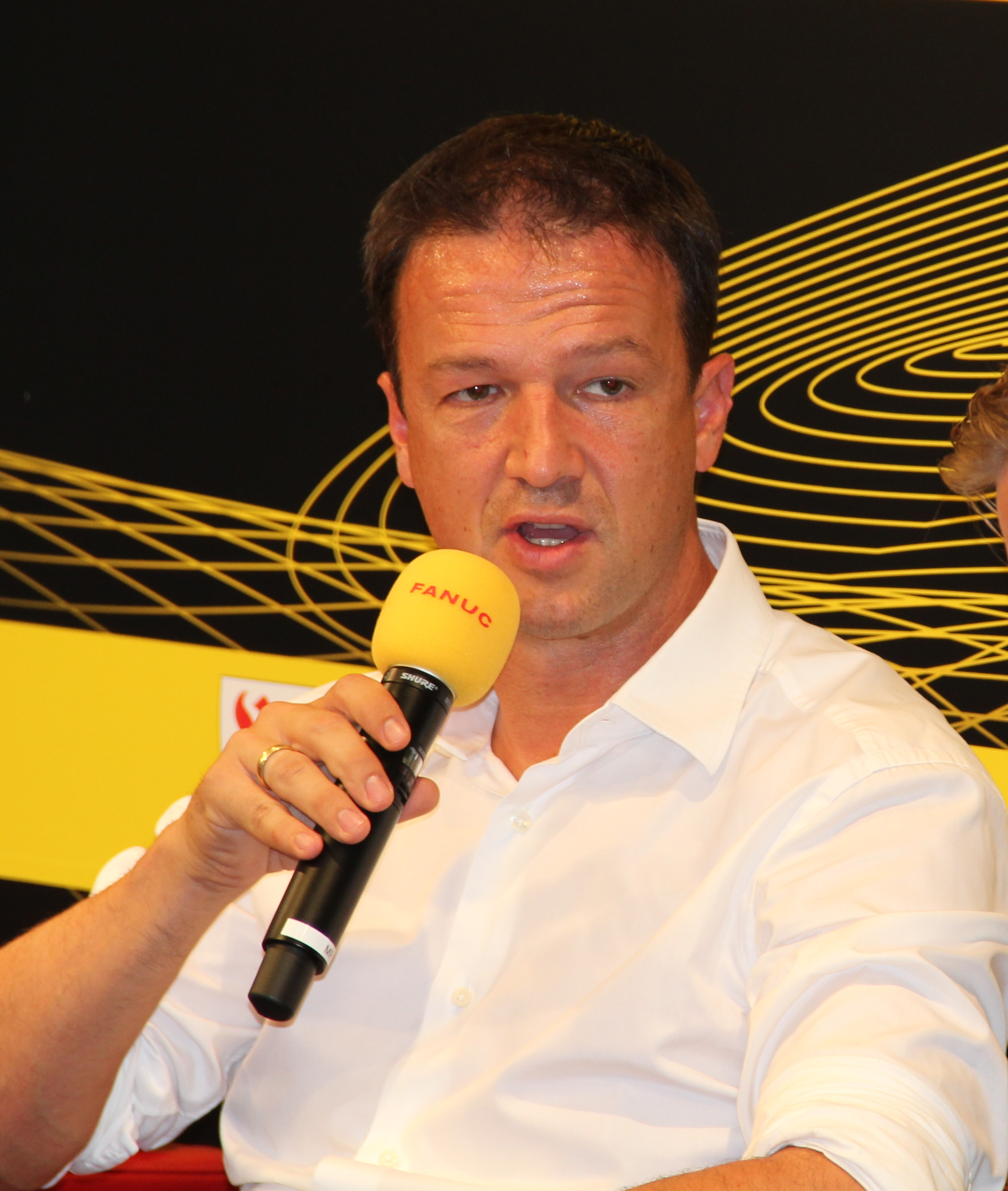
Fredi Bobic

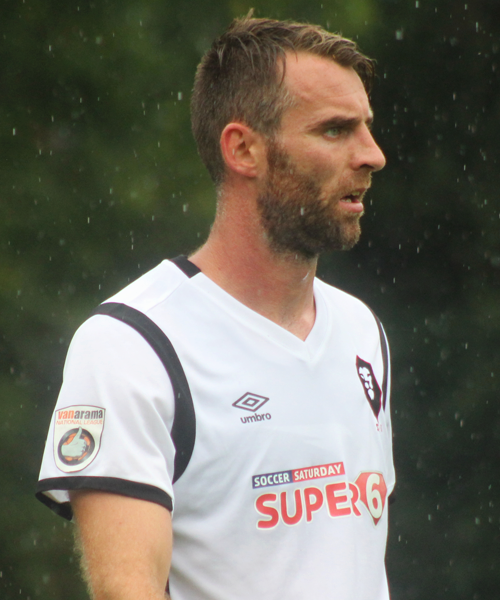
Danny Livesey

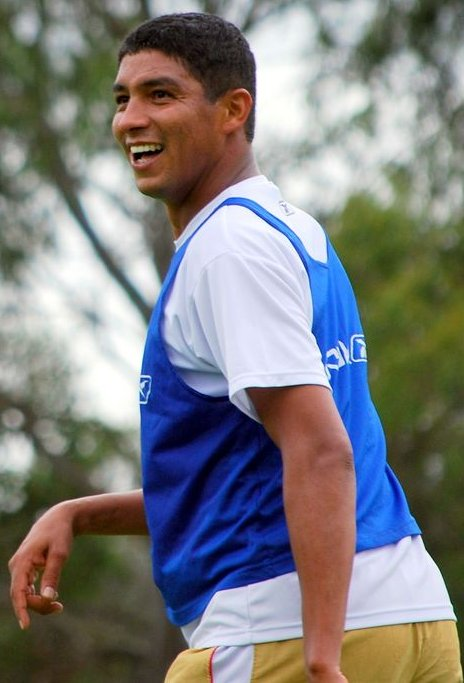
Mario Jardel

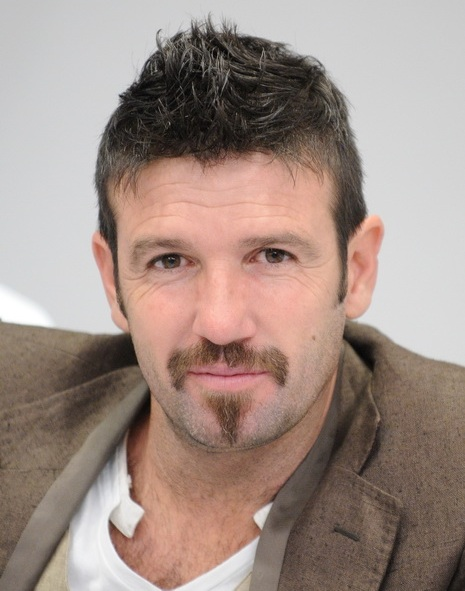
Vincent Candela

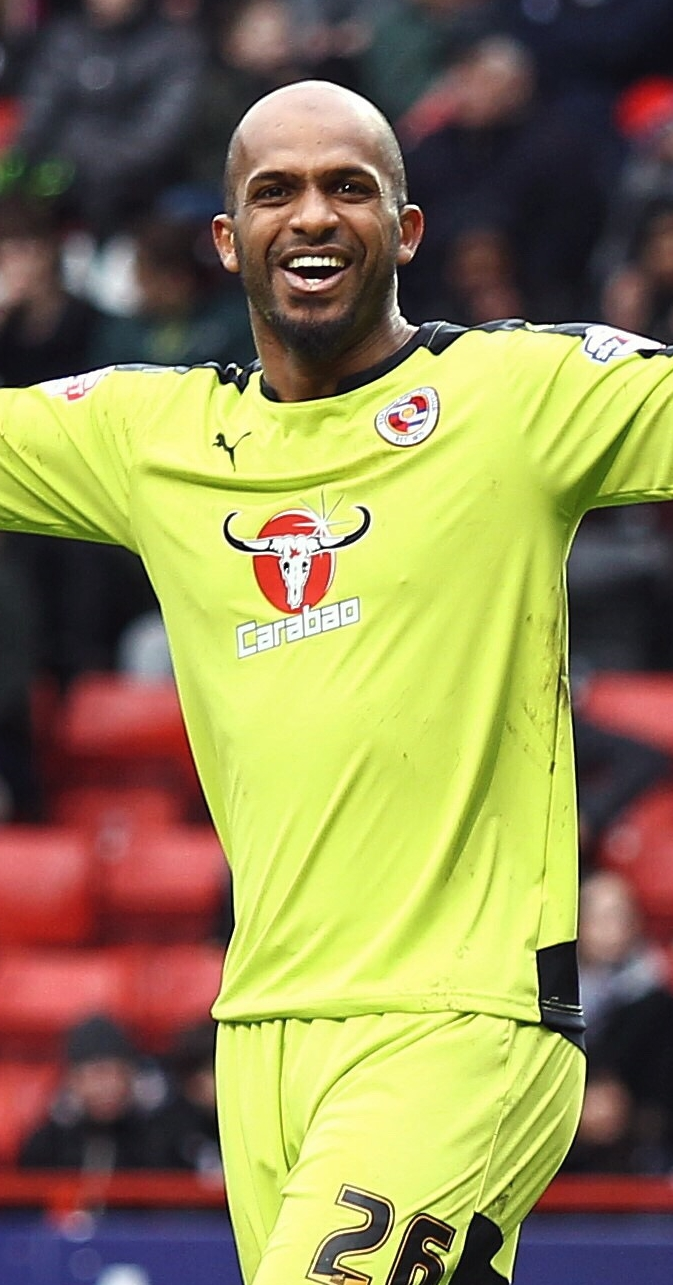
Ali Al-Habsi

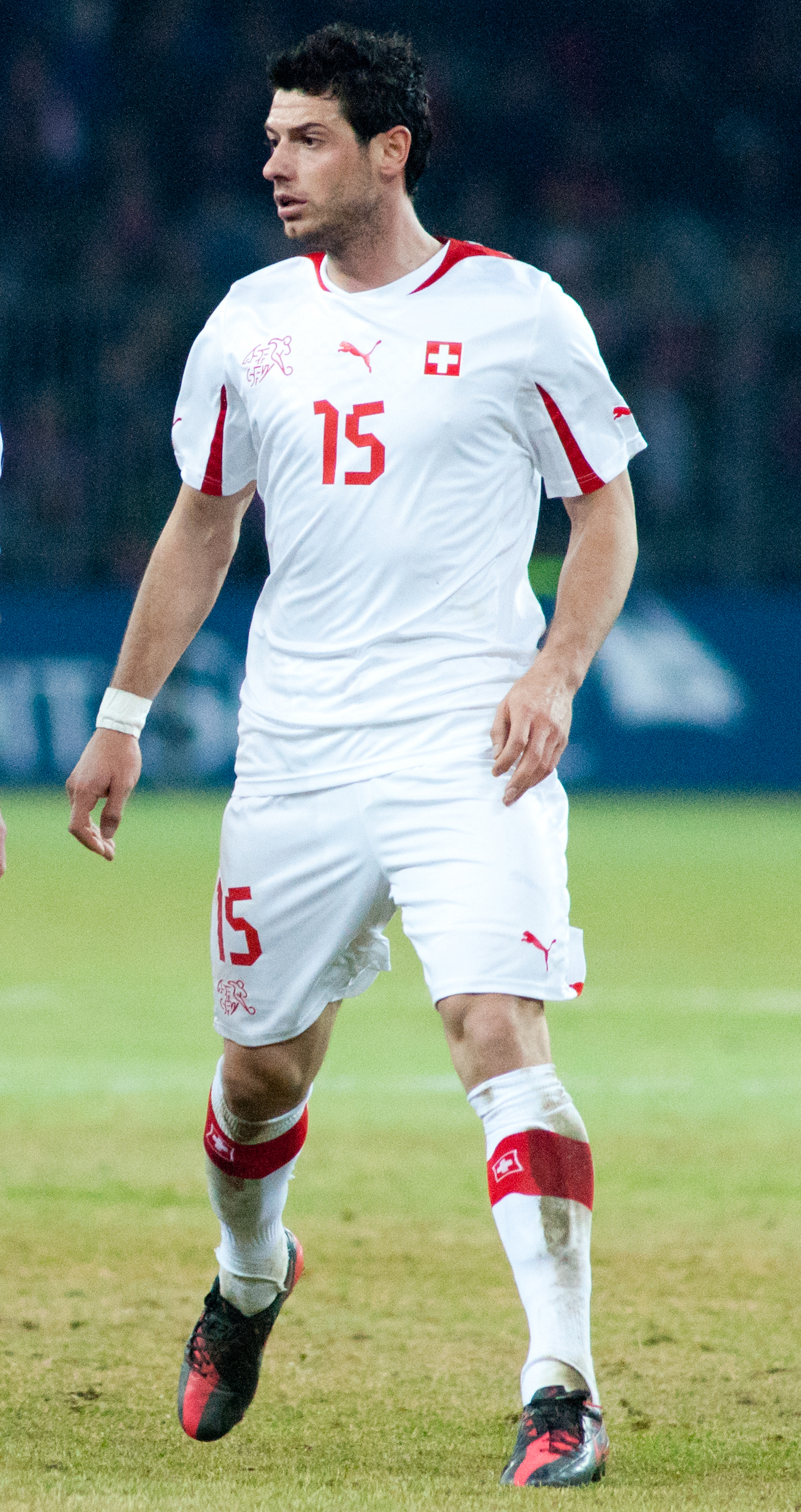
Blerim Džemaili

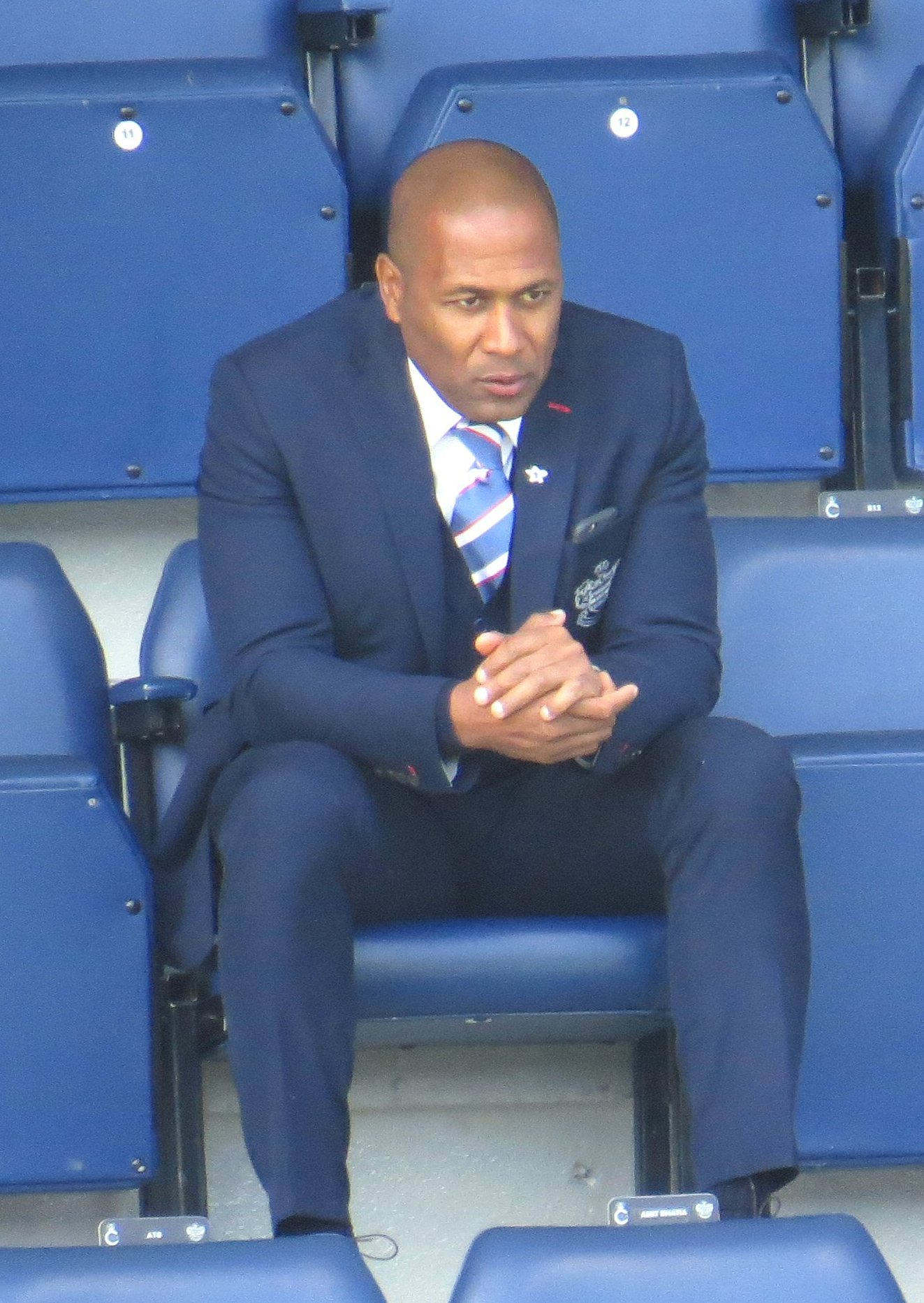
Les Ferdinand

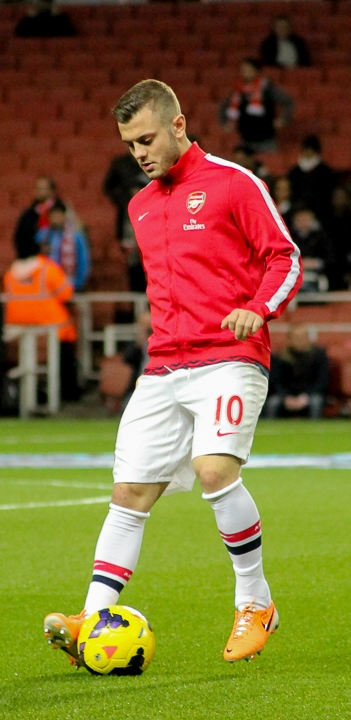
Jack Wilshere

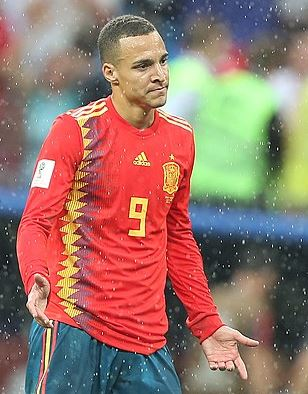
Rodrigo Moreno

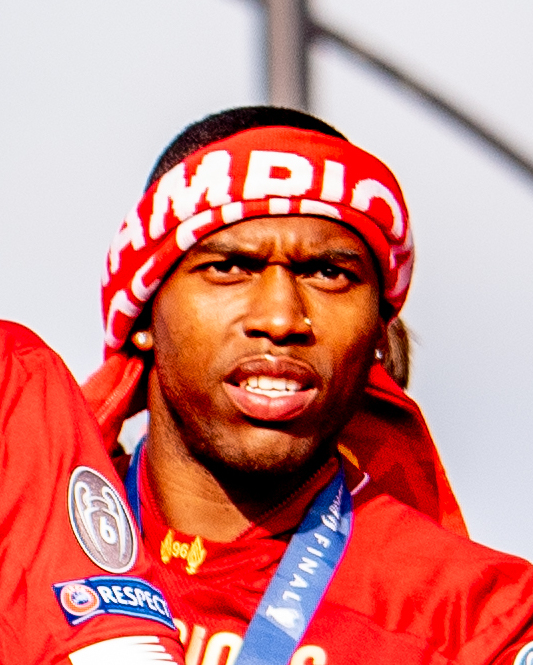
Daniel Sturridge

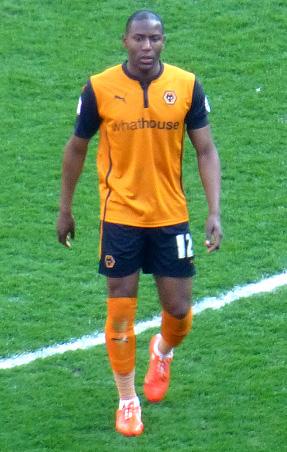
Benik Afobe

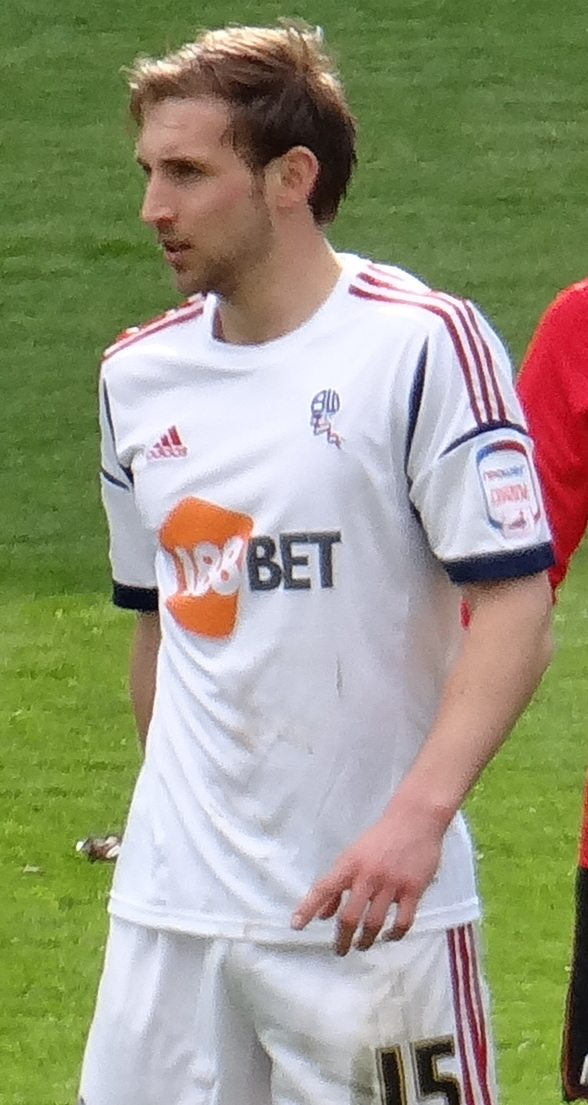
Craig Dawson

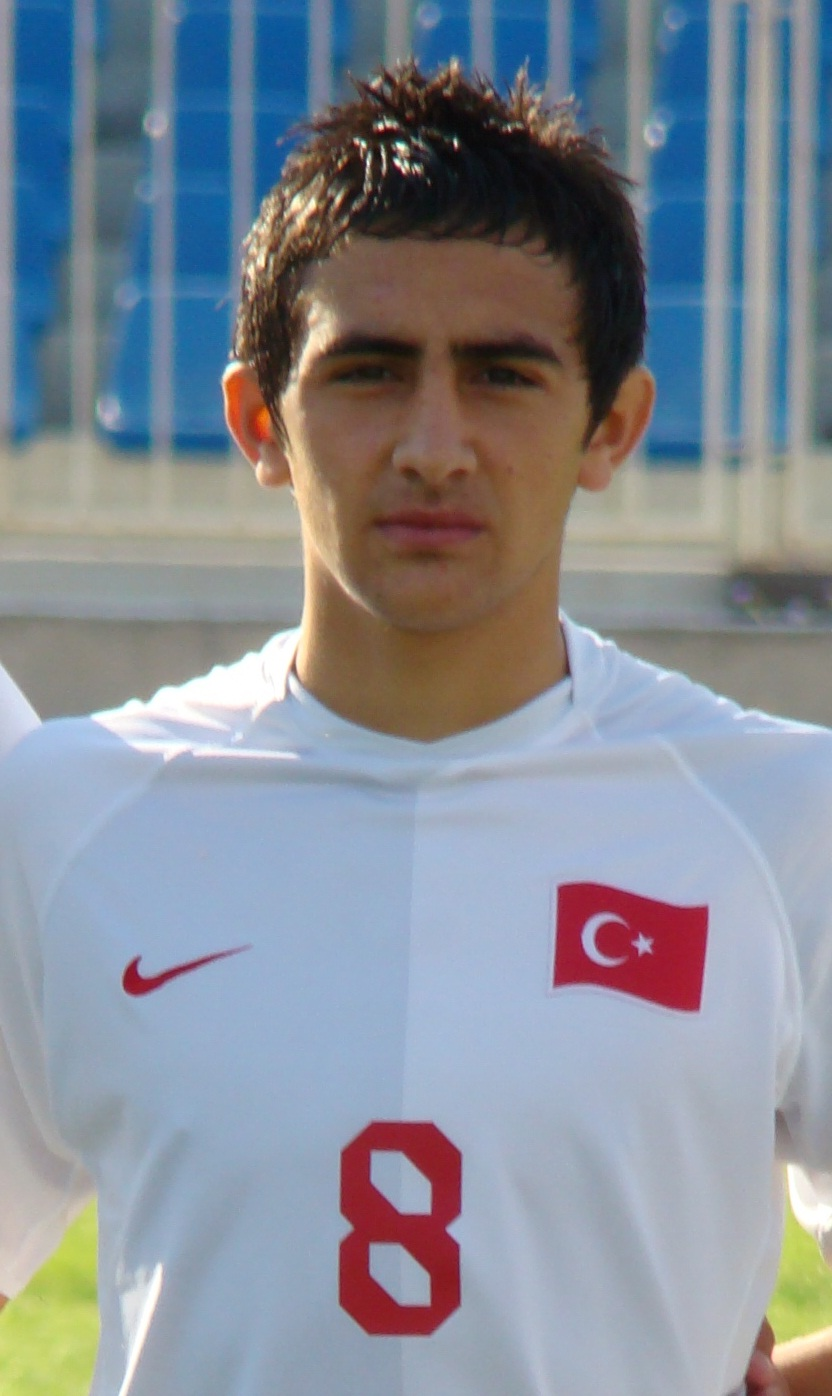
Jem Karacan
- Appearances and goals are for first-team competitive matches only, including Premier League, Football League, FA Cup, League Cup, Football League Trophy, Charity Shield and UEFA Cup; wartime matches are regarded as unofficial and are excluded, as are matches from the abandoned 1939–40 season.
- Players are listed according to the date of their first team debut for the club.

Statistics correct as of match played 21 November 2026

Table headers

- Nationality – If a player played international football, the country or countries he played for are shown. Otherwise, the player's nationality is given as his country of birth.
- Bolton Wanderers career – The year of the player's first appearance for Bolton Wanderers to the year of his last appearance.
- Starts – The number of games started.
- Sub – The number of games played as a substitute.
- Total – The total number of games played, both as a starter and as a substitute.

Positions key
Pre-1960s		Post-1960s	
GK	Goalkeeper		
FB	Full back	DF	Defender
HB	Half back	MF	Midfielder
FW	Forward		
U	Utility player^{1}		

Name	Nationality	Position	Bolton Wanderers career	Starts	Subs	Total	Goals	Ref
Name	Nationality	Position	Bolton Wanderers career	Appearances			Goals	Ref
J. Atherton				5	0	5	3	
Bateson				1	0	1	0	
Baxendale				1	0	1	0	
J. Christie				5	0	5	0	
W. Cox				5	0	5	0	
T. Dawson				1	0	1	0	
J. Devlin				3	0	3	0	
L. Fallon				6	0	6	5	
J. Fowler				7	0	7	0	
Gent				1	0	1	0	
Glaister				2	0	2	0	
J. Gleaves				13	0	13	2	
Gregory				2	0	2	1	
T. Hay				5	0	5	0	
J. Haydock				6	0	6	0	
Henderson				1	0	1	0	
Hewitson				2	0	2	3	
Holden				5	0	5	0	
Hough				2	0	2	0	
P. Howarth				8	0	8	3	
T. Howarth				6	0	6	1	
Jackson				3	0	3	0	
Jones				2	0	2	0	
J. Kennedy				10	0	10	0	
J. McKernon				17	0	17	0	
James Moores				3	0	3	1	
Tom Naylor				3	0	3	0	
Nelson				1	0	1	0	
R. Owen				3	0	3	0	
D.W. Parkinson				3	0	3	0	
W. Parkinson				1	0	1	0	
Jack Powell				6	0	6	0	
Robertson				3	0	3	0	
J. Scholes				2	0	2	1	
R. Steel				14	0	14	8	
W. Steel				8	0	8	0	
Bob Struthers				19	0	19	18	
Jimmy Trainer				4	0	4	0	
W. Unsworth				5	0	5	0	
Jacky Vaughan				4	0	4	1	
Ward				3	0	3	0	
T.R. Wilson				8	0	8	0	
J. Young				4	0	4	0	
T. Coupar			1888–1890	5	0	5	1	
F. Dyer			1888–1889	1	0	1	0	
W. Flitcroft			1888–1890	8	0	8	0	
S.G. Gillam			1888–1889	2	0	2	0	
Greenhalgh			1888–1889	3	0	3	0	
C.E. Harrison			1888–1890	24	0	24	0	
Knowles			1888–1889	3	0	3	2	
McGuiness			1888–1889	1	0	1	0	
Mercer			1888–1889	1	0	1	0	
John Mitchell		DF	1888–1889	2	0	2	0	
G. Owen			1888–1889	8	0	8	3	
J. Scowcroft			1888–1889	11	0	11	1	
Siddons			1888–1889	1	0	1	0	
W. Simmers			1888–1889	4	0	4	2	
R. Turner			1888–1889	3	0	3	0	
Harry Tyrer			1888–1889	14	0	14	2	
Whittle			1888–1889	3	0	3	1	
A. McWhirter			1889–1890	4	0	4	0	
J. Pearson			1889–1890	5	0	5	0	
W. Rushton			1889–1890	7	0	7	0	
F. Woods			1889–1890	5	0	5	0	
R.H. Jarrett			1890–1891	5	0	5	0	
W. Russell			1890–1892	6	0	6	0	
J.E. Chirnside			1891–1892	1	0	1	0	
H. Matthew			1892–1893	8	0	8	0	
G. Ferguson			1893–1896	19	0	19	3	
Archie Hughes			1893–1894	20	0	20	3	
R.R. Lawson			1893–1895	2	0	2	0	
A. Lever			1893–1894	1	0	1	0	
W. McArthur			1893–1894	19	0	19	6	
T. Shuttleworth			1893–1895	2	0	2	0	
William Andrews			1894–1895	13	0	13	3	
J. Docherty			1894–1895	2	0	2	0	
A. Guest			1894–1895	1	0	1	0	
J. Lyden			1894–1895	3	0	3	1	
James Martin			1894–1896	7	0	7	1	
J. McGinn			1894–1895	15	0	15	3	
J. Millar			1894–1896	10	0	10	1	
J. Settle			1894–1895	15	0	15	4	
A. Spence			1894–1895	5	0	5	2	
J. Stevenson			1894–1895	2	0	2	0	
G. Alexander			1895–1896	2	0	2	0	
A. Gillies			1895–1896	6	0	6	0	
J. Gunn			1895–1896	8	0	8	7	
E. Hamilton			1895–1896	3	0	3	0	
W. McReddie			1895–1896	2	0	2	0	
Paddy Smith			1895–1897	4	0	4	0	
Peter Turnbull	Scotland	FW	1895	4	0	4	5	
Tommy Vail		FW	1895–1896	4	0	4	1	
A. Hiles			1896–1897	1	0	1	0	
Fred Scotchbrook			1896–1900	5	0	5	0	
S. Scott			1896–1898	19	0	19	0	
H.H. Chorlton			1897–1901	9	0	9	2	
J. Gregory			1897–1899	6	0	6	0	
Joe Lee			1897–1899	6	0	6	0	
J. Miller			1897–1898	9	0	9	1	
W. Tatham			1897–1898	2	0	2	0	
J. Barnes			1898–1899	11	0	11	1	
R. Bolton			1898–1899	2	0	2	0	
S.R. Carr			1898–1899	2	0	2	0	
W.H. Davies			1898–1899	21	0	21	0	
W. Gilligan			1898–1899	3	0	3	0	
H. Howcroft			1898–1899	5	0	5	0	
Tom Hynds			1898–1899	8	0	8	0	
T. Marshall			1898–1903	4	0	4	0	
P. McKay			1898–1899	3	0	3	0	
A. Anthony			1899–1900	3	0	3	0	
J. Jones			1899–1900	2	0	2	0	
W.H. Waller			1899–1901	6	0	6	0	
H. Astley			1900–1902	6	0	6	0	
Frank Bell			1900–1902	5	0	5	0	
J. Burnison			1900–1902	18	0	18	0	
J. Calderbank			1900–1901	3	0	3	0	
Robert Haslam			1900–1901	1	0	1	0	
Bob Hodgkiss			1900–1901	1	0	1	0	
J. Low			1900–1901	1	0	1	0	
G.T. Smith			1900–1901	2	0	2	0	
T. Woolfall			1900–1901	23	0	23	0	
Martin Neyland	England	FW	1901–1902	2	0	2	0	
Harold Williams			1901–1903	18	0	18	7	
W. Worthington			1901–1902	3	0	3	1	
J. Grime			1902–1903	3	0	3	0	
J.H. Knowles			1902–1903	3	0	3	3	
W. McAfferty			1902–1903	8	0	8	0	
D. McKay			1902–1903	8	0	8	0	
P. McWilliams			1902–1903	1	0	1	0	
W. Morgan			1902–1903	3	0	3	0	
T. Strang			1902–1903	3	0	3	0	
Fred Thompson	England	GK	1902–1903	21	0	21	0	
J. Foster			1903–1904	2	0	2	0	
Andy Gardner	Scotland	DF	1903–1904	8	0	8	1	
S. Heaton			1903–1904	4	0	4	1	
J. Leigh			1903–1904	2	0	2	0	
J.N. Robertson			1903–1906	15	0	15	0	
J. Shaw			1903–1905	8	0	8	0	
F. Warburton			1903–1904	1	0	1	0	
H. Abbott			1904–1905	1	0	1	0	
George Eccles	England	DF	1904–1905	6	0	6	0	
F. Featherstone			1904–1905	2	0	2	1	
Archie Taylor			1904–1905	6	0	6	0	
Tom Wilson			1904–1906	24	0	24	5	
J. Atkinson			1905–1907	3	0	3	1	
Charles Beckett			1905–1906	1	0	1	0	
H. King			1905–1906	1	0	1	0	
H. Lawrie			1905–1906	3	0	3	0	
Sam Napier			1905–1906	4	0	4	0	
Wolstenholme	England	DF	1905–1907	10	0	10	0	
W.E. Bates			1906–1907	2	0	2	1	
E. Dempsey			1906–1907	7	0	7	1	
G. Russell			1906–1908	4	0	4	0	
J. Thorp			1906–1907	2	0	2	0	
W. Weaver			1906–1907	4	0	4	1	
W.P. Evans			1907–1908	1	0	1	0	
J. Gee			1907–1908	7	0	7	0	
F. Rollinson			1907–1908	1	0	1	0	
James McClarence			1907–1909	15	0	15	6	
W. Stuart			1907–1910	7	0	7	1	
H. Tierney			1907–1908	1	0	1	0	
R. Craven			1908–1909	2	0	2	0	
D. Griffiths			1908–1909	4	0	4	0	
W.A. Grundy			1908–1909	2	0	2	0	
J. Whiteside			1908–1911	7	0	7	1	
H.M. Adamson			1909–1911	15	0	15	0	
S. Woods			1908–1910	5	0	5	2	
H. Edmonds			1909–1911	10	0	10	0	
G. Jones			1909–1912	23	0	23	6	
H. Lockett			1909–1910	16	0	16	4	
J. Pulman			1909–1910	1	0	1	0	
H. Wilkinson			1909–1910	2	0	2	0	
Joe Hewitt			1910–1911	11	0	11	3	
S. Newton			1910–1912	15	0	15	0	
Fred Shinton	England	FW	1910–1911	7	0	7	1	
W. Egerton			1911–1912	3	0	3	0	
George Kay	England	MF	1911	3	0	3	0	
James Tyldesley			1911–1914	12	0	12	0	
A. Weir			1912–1913	2	0	2	2	
John Baverstock			1913–1914	2	0	2	0	
C.B. Hateley			1913–1914	1	0	1	0	
T.W. Heslop			1913–1915	7	0	7	0	
Alex Lochart			1913–1914	2	0	2	0	
Eric Sidlow			1913–1915	20	0	20	0	
H. Smith			1913–1914	8	0	8	1	
Jimmy Kidd	England	GK	1914	9	0	9	0	
P.E.S. Toone			1914–1915	3	0	3	0	
W. Wallace			1914–1915	2	0	2	1	
H.R. Cartman			1919–1922	22	0	22	0	
Alf Davies			1919–1920	8	0	8	1	
W.S. Gimblett			1919–1920	2	0	2	0	
J. Hodson			1919–1922	22	0	22	0	
J.M. Howarth			1919–1920	1	0	1	0	
W. Hulme			1919–1920	3	0	3	0	
J.H. Pickup			1919–1920	1	0	1	0	
A. Winterburn			1919–1920	1	0	1	0	
John Elvey			1920–1922	11	0	11	0	
G. Guy			1920–1921	2	0	2	1	
F. Mellor			1920–1922	2	0	2	0	
A.E. Moss			1920–1921	1	0	1	0	
T. Walsh			1920–1924	22	0	22	4	
S. Wright			1920–1922	10	0	10	0	
F. Chambers			1921–1924	13	0	13	0	
Fred Keetley			1921–1922	1	0	1	0	
J.P. Long			1921–1922	1	0	1	0	
J. Lowe			1921–1922	6	0	6	0	
E. Roberts			1921–1923	5	0	5	0	
H. Simpson			1921–1924	9	0	9	1	
Charles Smith			1921–1923	7	0	7	0	
W. Crewe			1922–1923	4	0	4	0	
Charles Flood			1922–1923	8	0	8	2	
Johnston			1922–1923	1	0	1	0	
J.L.M. Jones			1922–1926	15	0	15	3	
V.E. Matthews			1922–1925	3	0	3	0	
J. Newnes			1922–1923	7	0	7	0	
P. Thirkell			1922–1923	15	0	15	0	
J.T. Bourne			1924–1925	3	0	3	0	
Joe Cassidy			1924–1925	22	0	22	7	
R.I. Davies			1924–1926	3	0	3	0	
T. Eatock			1924–1926	11	0	11	1	
J. Forbes			1924–1926	3	0	3	0	
Albert Picken			1925–1928	18	0	18	2	
Les Roberts			1925–1927	6	0	6	2	
W. Yates			1925–1927	6	0	6	0	
W.D. Roberts			1926–1927	5	0	5	4	
H. Gough			1927–1928	4	0	4	0	
J. Bryan			1929–1930	1	0	1	1	
A. Parry			1929–1930	5	0	5	0	
M. Davin			1930–1931	3	0	3	0	
F.C. Corringe			1930–1931	1	0	1	0	
Tommy Tait	England	FW	1930–1931	10	0	4	0	
Jimmy Boyle			1931–1933	14	0	14	0	
Tommy Walters			1931–1932	5	0	5	1	
F. W. Wilson			1931–1933	4	0	4	1	
Dick Edmed	England	MF	1932–1933	5	0	5	1	
J.H. Hughes			1933–1934	9	0	9	3	
E. Jones			1933–1934	1	0	1	0	
Bill Chambers			1934–1935	2	0	2	1	
George Goldsmith	England	DF	1934–1935	19	0	19	0	
Tom Clark			1935–1937	23	0	23	0	
G. Kirkman			1935–1936	1	0	1	0	
Cyril Woods			1935–1936	2	0	2	1	
George Ainsley	England	FW	1936	7	0	7	0	
Ron Bower			1936–1937	3	0	3	0	
David Halford			1936–1938	8	0	8	2	
Jimmy Jones			1937–1938	6	0	6	1	
Cam Burgess	England	FW	1938–1948	5	0	5	3	
Edward Goodall			1938–1939	12	0	12	0	
F.K. Marsh			1938–1939	3	0	3	0	
Walter Sidebottom			1938–1939	1	0	1	0	
Tommy Sinclair			1938–1939	10	0	10	5	
John Aspinall	England		1946–1950	14	0	14	0	
Alan Middlebrough	England		1946–1948	5	0	5	1	
Richard Threlfall	England		1946–1947	11	0	11	0	
Billy Wrigglesworth			1946–1948	15	0	15	2	
Vincent Dillon	England		1947–1951	17	0	17	2	
James Jackson			1947–1950	11	0	1	0	
Alfred Lees	England		1947–1948	2	0	2	0	
John Simm			1947–1948	1	0	1	0	
Walter Bingley	England	DF	1948–1955	6	0	6	0	
Ernest Corfield	England		1948–1952	6	0	6	0	
Thomas Kinsell	England		1949–1950	17	0	17	0	
Alan Beards	England		1950–1954	14	0	14	2	
Gordon Kennedy	Scotland		1950–1951	18	0	18	0	
Robert Mathewson	England		1950–1953	3	0	3	0	
Matthew McIlwaine	Scotland		1952–1953	2	0	2	0	
Vincent Pilling	England		1952–1955	7	0	7	0	
Arthur Barnard	England		1954–1956	2	0	2	0	
Joseph Dean	England		1955–1960	17	0	17	0	
William Edisbury	England		1956–1958	2	0	2	0	
Malcolm Edwards	Wales		1956–1961	14	0	14	1	
Brian Riley	England		1956–1959	8	0	8	1	
Dennis Bailey	England	FW	1958	1	0	1	0	
Jeffrey Edwards	Wales		1958–1959	3	0	3	0	
John Bollands	England		1959–1960	13	0	13	0	
Richard Oxtoby	England		1959–1960	4	0	4	0	
Ernie Phythian	England	FW	1959–1961	11	0	11	3	
Reginald Hender			1960–1961	1	0	1	0	
Roy Wilkinson	England		1960–1962	3	0	3	0	
Geoffrey Sleight	England		1961–1962	3	0	3	0	
Albert Goulden	England		1962–1963	1	0	1	0	
Eric Redrobe	England	FW	1962–1965	4	0	4	1	
William Russell	England		1962–1965	22	0	22	2	
Alex Smith	England	GK	1962–1968	20	0	20	0	
James Davison	England		1963–1964	22	0	22	1	
Barry Fry	England	MF	1964–1965	3	0	3	1	
Harry Beech	England		1965–1967	15	1	16	0	
Martin Dobson	England	MF	1966	1	0	1	0	
Bob Hatton	England	FW	1967–1968	23	1	24	2	
Geoffrey Roberts	England		1967–1970	5	0	5	0	
Geoffrey Bromilow	England		1968–1969	3	2	5	0	
Chris Duffey	England		1969–1972	10	0	10	1	
Peter Clarke	England		1970–1971	13	0	13	0	
Roger Denton	England		1971–1972	3	1	4	0	
Kevin McMahon	England		1971–1972	4	2	6	1	
Graham Rowe	England	DF	1971–1972	6	2	8	1	
Michael McBurney	Wales		1973–1974	1	0	1	0	
Peter Olinyk	England		1973–1975	7	3	10	0	
Steve Smith	England	U	1974–1975	3	0	3	0	
Andy Clements	England	DF	1977–1978	1	0	1	0	
Craig Moores	England		1980–1981	0	1	1	0	
Dennis Peacock	England	GK	1980–1982	20	0	20	0	
Trevor Hebberd	England	MF	1981	6	0	6	0	
Geoffrey Langley	England		1981–1982	5	3	8	0	
John McGovern	Scotland	MF	1982–1984	20	0	20	1	
Stuart Gray	England	MF	1983	10	0	10	0	
John Platt	England		1983–1984	11	0	11	0	
Ian Bailey	England	DF	1982; 1984–1985	16	2	18	0	
Steve Saunders	England		1983–1984	4	2	6	0	
Eric Snookes	England		1983–1984	6	0	6	0	
Paul Booth	England		1984–1985	2	0	2	0	
David Cross	England	FW	1984–1985	23	1	24	10	
Paul Lodge	England	MF	1984–1985	5	0	5	0	
Roger Walker	England	MF	1984–1986	8	6	14	1	
Wayne Entwistle	England	FW	1985–1986	6	5	11	0	
Tony Evans	England	FW	1985	5	0	5	0	
Paul Fitzpatrick	England	DF	1985–1986	18	1	19	0	
Michael Ring	England		1985–1986	1	2	3	0	
Dean Roberts	England		1985–1986	1	0	1	0	
Stuart Ripley	England	MF	1986	5	0	5	1	
Paul Allen	England		1986–1987	2	1	3	1	
Paul Griffin			1986–1987	0	1	1	0	
Neil Matthews	England		1986–1987	1	0	1	0	
Ian Mullineux	England		1986–1987	1	2	3	0	
Paul Atkinson	England	MF	1987	2	1	3	0	
Paul Hughes	England		1987–1991	15	0	15	1	
Peter Barnes	England	MF	1987; 1988	4	2	6	0	
Ian Callaghan	England		1987–1988	2	0	2	0	
Andy May	England	MF	1987	9	1	10	2	
Glenn Keeley	England	DF	1988–1989	23	0	23	1	
Michael Jeffrey	England	FW	1989–1992	13	9	22	0	
Nigel Jemson	England	FW	1989	4	1	5	0	
Martin Pike	England	DF	1989–1990	6	0	6	1	
Kevin Rose	England	GK	1989–1991	16	0	16	0	
John Gregory	England	MF	1990	2	6	8	0	
Sammy Lee	England	MF	1990–1991	5	0	5	0	
Tony Cunningham	Jamaica	FW	1991	12	0	12	4	
Andy Dibble	Wales	GK	1991	14	0	14	0	
Andy Kennedy	Scotland	DF	1991	1	0	1	0	
Ally Maxwell	Scotland		1991–1992	3	0	3	0	
Gerry Peyton	Republic of Ireland	GK	1991–1992	1	0	1	0	
Andy Roscoe	England	DF	1991–1994	3	2	5	0	
Chic Charnley	Scotland	MF	1992	3	0	3	0	
Darren Oliver	England		1992–1993	4	0	4	0	
Robert Fleck	Scotland	FW	1993	7	1	8	1	
Steve Fulton	Scotland	MF	1993–1994	6	1	7	0	
Russell Hoult	England	GK	1993–1994	4	1	5	0	
Gary Parkinson	England	DF	1993–1994	5	2	7	0	
Stuart Whittaker	England	MF	1993–1997	2	2	4	0	
Alan Kernaghan	Republic of Ireland	DF	1994	9	2	11	0	
Mark Walton	Wales	GK	1994	3	0	3	0	
Neil McDonald	England	U	1994–1995	6	0	6	0	
John Dreyer	England	U	1995	2	2	4	0	
Peter Shilton	England	GK	1995	1	1	2	0	
Wayne Burnett	England	MF	1995–1996	0	2	2	0	
Bryan Small	England	DF	1996–1998	15	0	15	1	
Greg Strong	England	DF	1996–2000	18	4	22	1	
Scott Taylor	England	MF	1996–1998	3	14	17	3	
Hasney Aljofree	England	DF	1997–2000	10	12	22	0	
Peter Beardsley	England	U	1997–1998	17	4	21	2	
Franz Carr	England	U	1997–1998	0	5	5	0	
Gaetano Giallanza	Switzerland	FW	1998	0	3	3	0	
John Salako	England	MF	1998	0	7	7	0	
Dean Holden	England	DF	1998–2002	13	8	21	1	
Jon Newsome	England	DF	1998–1999	6	0	6	0	
Jamie Fullarton	Scotland	MF	1999	1	0	1	0	
Darren Holloway	England	DF	1999–2000	3	1	4	0	
Mickaël Kapriélian	France	FW	1999–2001	0	1	1	0	
Lee Potter	England	FW	1999–2000	0	1	1	0	
Paul Ritchie	Scotland	DF	1999–2000	19	2	21	0	
Luke Staton	England	MF	1999–2000	0	1	1	0	
Chris Armstrong	England	FW	2000	1	0	1	0	
John Gope-Fenepej	New Caledonia	DF	2000	0	2	2	0	
Chris Downey	England	FW	2000–2003	0	1	1	0	
Carsten Fredgaard	Denmark	MF	2000–2001	1	4	5	0	
Allan Johnston	Scotland	MF	2000	21	2	23	4	
David Norris	England	MF	2000–2002	4	1	5	0	
Isaiah Rankin	England	MF	2000	11	7	18	2	
Leam Richardson	England	DF	2000–2003	9	9	18	0	
Paul Wheatcroft	England	FW	2000–2002	0	2	2	0	
Nicky Summerbee	England	MF	2001	12	3	15	0	
Juergen Sommer	United States	GK	2001	1	0	1	0	
Wayne Buchanan	Northern Ireland	DF	2001–2003	0	1	1	0	
Andy Campbell	England	FW	2001	3	3	6	0	
Tommy Wright	Northern Ireland	GK	2001	3	1	4	0	
Matt Clarke	England	GK	2001	11	0	11	0	
Jermaine Johnson	Jamaica	MF	2001–2003	8	9	17	0	
Djibril Diawara	France	DF	2001–2002	6	5	11	0	
Emanuele Morini	Italy	MF	2001–2002	2	1	3	0	
Akinori Nishizawa	Japan	FW	2001–2002	3	0	3	1	
Kevin Poole	England	GK	2001–2005	15	1	16	0	
Jeff Smith	England	U	2001–2004	7	1	8	0	
Nicky Southall	England	MF	2001–2003	16	8	24	1	
Cleveland Taylor	Jamaica	MF	2001–2004	0	2	2	0	
Jani Viander	Finland	GK	2001–2002	1	0	1	0	
Rod Wallace	England	FW	2001–2002	16	7	23	4	
Jonathan Walters	England	FW	2001–2004	1	5	6	0	
Stig Tøfting	Denmark	MF	2002–2003	11	6	17	0	
Mario Espartero	France	MF	2002	0	3	3	0	
Kostas Konstantinidis	Greece	DF	2002	3	0	3	0	
Fredi Bobic	Germany	FW	2002	14	2	16	4	
David Holdsworth	England	DF	2002	1	0	1	0	
Bernard Mendy	France	U	2002–2003	22	1	23	0	
Bülent Akin	Turkey	MF	2002–2003	2	1	3	0	
Danny Livesey	England	DF	2002–2004	4	2	6	0	
Delroy Facey	England	FW	2002–2004	5	9	14	2	
Pierre-Yves André	France	FW	2003	0	9	9	0	
Salva Ballesta	Spain	FW	2003	1	5	6	0	
Florent Laville	France	DF	2003–2005	15	0	15	0	
Glen Little	England	MF	2003	0	4	4	0	
Mario Jardel	Brazil	FW	2003–2004	4	8	12	3	
Ibrahim Ba	France	MF	2003–2004	6	10	16	0	
Charlie Comyn-Platt	England	DF	2003–2005	2	2	4	0	
Steve Howey	England	DF	2004	2	1	3	0	
Javi Moreno	Spain	FW	2004	1	9	10	0	
Jon Otsemobor	England	DF	2004	1	0	1	0	
Les Ferdinand	England	FW	2004–2005	2	12	14	2	
Júlio César	Brazil	DF	2004–2005	6	1	7	1	
Khalilou Fadiga	Senegal	MF	2004–2006	12	9	21	1	
Blessing Kaku	Nigeria	MF	2004	1	2	3	0	
Andy Oakes	England	GK	2004–2005	1	0	1	0	
Ricky Shakes	Trinidad and Tobago	MF	2004–2005	1	1	2	1	
Vincent Candela	France	DF	2005	10	2	12	0	
Martin Djetou	France	DF	2005–2006	2	3	5	0	
Ian Walker	England	GK	2005–2009	8	0	8	0	
Fabrice Fernandes	France	MF	2005–2006	3	2	5	0	
Robert Sissons	England	MF	2005–2009	0	1	1	0	
Sam Ashton	England	GK	2006	0	1	1	0	
Quinton Fortune	South Africa	DF	2006–2007	6	1	7	0	
Jarosław Fojut	Poland	DF	2006–2009	1	3	4	0	
Błażej Augustyn	Poland	DF	2006–2007	0	1	1	0	
Matt Jansen	England	FW	2006	3	4	7	0	
Johann Smith	United States	FW	2006–2008	0	3	3	0	
Idan Tal	Israel	MF	2006–2007	7	13	20	1	
James Sinclair	England	MF	2007–2009	0	3	3	0	
Ľubomír Michalík	Slovakia	DF	2007–2008	13	4	17	1	
César Martín	Spain	DF	2007	0	1	1	0	
Gérald Cid	France	DF	2007–2008	13	1	14	0	
Heiðar Helguson	Iceland	FW	2007–2009	6	4	10	2	
Ali Al-Habsi	Oman	GK	2007–2011	18	0	18	0	
Mikel Alonso	Spain	MF	2007–2008	8	4	12	0	
Daniel Braaten	Norway	MF	2007–2008	5	9	14	1	
Nathan Woolfe	England	FW	2007–2009	0	1	1	0	
David Thompson	England	MF	2007	3	5	8	0	
Christian Wilhelmsson	Sweden	MF	2007	4	9	13	0	
Chris Basham	England	U	2008–2010	6	15	21	1	
Grzegorz Rasiak	Poland	FW	2008	2	5	7	0	
Tope Obadeyi	England	FW	2008–2012	0	3	3	0	
Danny Shittu	Nigeria	DF	2008–2010	11	1	12	0	
Riga Mustapha	Netherlands	MF	2008–2011	3	16	19	0	
Ebi Smolarek	Poland	FW	2008–2009	1	12	13	1	
Blerim Džemaili	Switzerland	MF	2008–2009	0	1	1	0	
Sébastien Puygrenier	France	DF	2009	5	2	7	1	
Ariza Makukula	Portugal	FW	2009	4	2	6	0	
Danny Ward	England	FW	2009–2011	0	2	2	0	
Sean Davis	England	MF	2009–2012	4	0	4	0	
Jack Wilshere	England	MF	2010	13	1	14	1	
Vladimír Weiss	Slovakia	MF	2010	3	10	13	0	
Robbie Blake	England	FW	2010–2012	4	11	15	1	
Rodrigo Moreno	Spain	MF	2010–2011	6	15	21	1	
Daniel Sturridge	England	FW	2011	11	1	12	8	
Joe Riley	England	DF	2011–2015	8	1	9	0	
Tuncay Şanlı	Turkey	FW	2011–2012	6	16	22	1	
Adam Blakeman	England	U	2011–2013	0	1	1	0	
Michael O'Halloran	Scotland	FW	2011–2014	0	2	2	0	
Dedryck Boyata	Belgium	DF	2011–2012	17	1	18	1	
Gaël Kakuta	DR Congo	U	2011	2	4	6	1	
Ryo Miyaichi	Japan	MF	2012	10	4	14	1	
Benik Afobe	England	FW	2012–2013	7	16	23	3	
Stephen Warnock	England	DF	2012	15	0	15	0	
Jacob Butterfield	England	MF	2012–2013	4	4	8	0	
Steve De Ridder	Belgium	MF	2013	2	1	3	0	
Craig Dawson	England	DF	2013	16	0	16	4	
Sanmi Odelusi	England	FW	2013–2015	2	7	9	2	
Tom Eaves	England	FW	2013–2016	1	4	5	0	
Marc Tierney	England	DF	2013–2015	9	0	9	0	
Tom Youngs	England	FW	2013–2015	0	2	2	0	
Kevin McNaughton	Scotland	DF	2013; 2014–2015	21	1	22	1	
Hayden White	England	DF	2013–2016	3	2	5	0	
Lukas Jutkiewicz	England	FW	2014	16	4	23	6	
Chris Lester	England	MF	2014–2015	1	1	2	0	
Andy Kellett	England	DF	2014–2015	1	3	4	0	
Oscar Threlkeld	England	DF	2014–2016	10	1	11	0	
Conor Wilkinson	Republic of Ireland	FW	2014–2017	6	11	17	0	
Owen Garvan	Republic of Ireland	MF	2014	3	0	3	0	
Chris Herd	Australia	DF	2014	3	0	3	0	
Tom Walker	England	MF	2015–2017	12	7	19	1	
Barry Bannan	Scotland	MF	2015	15	1	16	0	
Filip Twardzik	Czech Republic	MF	2015–2016	1	4	5	1	
Simeon Slavchev	Bulgaria	MF	2015	0	1	1	0	
Saidy Janko	Gambia	MF	2015	6	4	10	1	
Paddy McCarthy	Republic of Ireland	DF	2015	5	0	5	0	
Giles Coke	England	MF	2015	3	1	4	0	
Rochinha	Portugal	MF	2015	4	0	4	0	
Kaiyne Woolery	England	MF	2015–2016	6	18	24	3	
Quade Taylor	England	DF	2015–2016	1	0	1	0	
Prince-Désir Gouano	France	DF	2015–2016	19	0	19	0	
Alex Finney	England	DF	2015–2016	2	1	3	0	
Francesco Pisano	Italy	DF	2015–2016	2	1	3	0	
José Manuel Casado	Spain	DF	2015–2016	9	0	9	0	
Shola Ameobi	Nigeria	FW	2015–2016	6	4	10	2	
Paul Rachubka	England	GK	2015–2016	7	1	8	0	
Niall Maher	England	DF	2016	5	0	5	0	
Alex Samizadeh	Iran	FW	2016–2017	0	2	2	0	
Tyler Garratt	England	DF	2016	2	1	3	0	
George Newell	England	FW	2016–2017	0	1	1	0	
Chris Taylor	England	MF	2016–2018	7	16	23	0	
Lewis Buxton	England	DF	2016–2017	11	0	11	0	
Jack Earing	England	MF	2016–2019	2	2	4	0	
Alex Perry	England	MF	2016–2018	2	0	2	0	
Keshi Anderson	England	FW	2016–2017	4	6	10	1	
Chris Long	England	MF	2017	3	7	10	1	
Viv Solomon-Otabor	England	MF	2017	0	4	4	0	
Reece Wabara	England	DF	2017	1	0	1	0	
Jem Karacan	Turkey	MF	2017–2018	17	6	23	2	
Stephen Darby	England	DF	2017–2018	5	0	5	0	
Josh Cullen	Republic of Ireland	MF	2017–2018	9	3	12	0	
Adam Armstrong	England	FW	2017–2018	15	7	22	3	
Jeff King	England	MF	2017–2018	2	1	3	0	
Connor Hall	England	FW	2018–2020	1	3	4	0	
Harry Charsley	Republic of Ireland	MF	2018	1	0	1	0	
Tyler Walker	England	FW	2018	3	2	5	0	
Jon Flanagan	England	DF	2018	8	1	9	0	
Jan Kirchhoff	Germany	DF	2018	2	2	4	0	
Yanic Wildschut	Suriname	FW	2018–2019	6	12	18	2	
Marc Wilson	Republic of Ireland	DF	2018–2019	14	3	17	0	
Jonathan Grounds	England	DF	2018–2019	14	1	15	0	
Erhun Oztumer	England	MF	2018–2019	10	9	19	1	
Christian Doidge	Wales	FW	2018–2019	8	9	17	1	
Luca Connell	Republic of Ireland	MF	2019	9	3	12	0	
Callum Connolly	England	DF	2019	15	1	16	2	
Lloyd Dyer	England	MF	2019	2	5	7	0	
Joe Muscatt	Malta	DF	2019	0	1	1	0	
Joe Pritchard	England	MF	2019	2	3	5	0	
Matthew Alexander	England	GK	2019–2022	2	0	2	0	
Jordan Boon	England	DF	2019–2020	2	3	5	0	
Eddie Brown	England	FW	2019–2020	6	1	7	0	
De'Marlio Brown-Sterling	England	MF	2019–2020	1	3	4	0	
Josh Earl	England	DF	2019–2020	10	1	11	0	
Liam Edwards	England	DF	2019–2022	7	1	8	0	
Sonny Graham	England	MF	2019–2021	10	8	18	0	
Finlay Lockett	England	U	2019–2024	1	4	5	0	
Callum King-Harmes	Wales	MF	2019–2021	5	2	7	0	
James Weir	England	MF	2019–2020	11	1	12	0	
Joe White	England	DF	2019–2020	3	2	5	0	
Yoan Zouma	France	DF	2019–2020	20	3	23	0	
Regan Riley	England	MF	2019–2021	0	2	2	0	
Adam Senior	England	DF	2019–2023	6	1	7	1	
Jay Fitzmartin	England	MF	2019–2022	0	1	1	0	
Jake Wright	England	DF	2019–2020	12	0	12	0	
Adam Chicksen	Zimbabwe	DF	2019–2020	17	3	20	0	
Liam Bridcutt	Scotland	MF	2019	12	0	12	0	
Thibaud Verlinden	Belgium	MF	2019–2020	14	4	18	3	
Chris O'Grady	England	FW	2019–2020	13	10	23	4	
Aristote Nsiala	DR Congo	DF	2020	12	0	12	0	
Ethan Hamilton	Scotland	MF	2020	12	0	12	1	
Muhammadu Faal	England	FW	2020–2021	0	2	2	0	
Brandon Fleming	England	DF	2020	10	0	10	0	
Kean Bryan	England	DF	2020	6	0	6	1	
Anthony Georgiou	Cyprus	MF	2020	0	2	2	0	
Billy Crellin	England	GK	2020–2021	16	0	16	0	
George Taft	England	DF	2020–2021	5	0	5	0	
Brandon Comley	Montserrat	MF	2020–2021	9	6	14	0	
Tom White	England	MF	2020–2021	9	5	14	0	
Shaun Miller	England	FW	2020–2021	1	23	24	4	
Jak Hickman	England	DF	2020–2021	6	1	7	1	
Reiss Greenidge	Guyana	DF	2020–2022	4	3	7	0	
Bright Amoateng	England	FW	2020–2022	0	1	1	0	
Andrew Tutte	England	MF	2020–2022	14	7	21	0	
Jamie Mascoll	England	U	2020–2021	3	6	9	1	
Peter Kioso	Republic of Ireland	DF	2020	14	0	14	2	
Mitchell Henry	England	FW	2020–2022	0	5	5	0	
Ben Jackson	England	DF	2021	5	0	5	1	
Zack Elbouzedi	Republic of Ireland	MF	2021	2	11	13	0	
Marcus Maddison	England	MF	2021	4	6	10	0	
Xavier Amaechi	England	MF	2021–2022	3	9	12	1	
Arran Pettifer	England	MF	2021–2024	0	2	2	0	
Matthew Tweedley	England	MF	2021–2024	0	1	1	0	
Marlon Fossey	United States	DF	2022	16	0	16	1	
Nelson Khumbeni	Malawi	MF	2022–2025	0	2	2	1	
Lamine Toure	England	DF	2022–2024	0	1	1	0	
Owen Beck	Wales	DF	2022–2023	4	5	9	0	
Conor Carty	Republic of Ireland	FW	2022–2025	0	1	1	1	
Shola Shoretire	England	MF	2023	12	4	16	1	
Luke Mbete	England	DF	2023	9	0	9	1	
Zac Ashworth	Wales	DF	2023–2024	12	11	23	3	
Joel Coleman	England	GK	2023–2025	19	0	19	0	
Luke Matheson	England	DF	2023–2025	3	4	7	1	
Sam Inwood	Northern Ireland	DF	2023–	3	2	5	0	
Sonny Sharples-Ahmed	Egypt	MF	2023–2026	2	5	7	0	
Nathanael Ogbeta	England	DF	2024	14	3	17	2	
Calvin Ramsay	Scotland	DF	2024	2	2	4	0	
Caleb Taylor	England	DF	2024	4	3	7	0	
Scott Arfield	Canada	U	2024–2025	7	9	16	0	
Conor Lewis	England	MF	2024–	0	1	1	0	
Luke Hutchinson	England	GK	2024–2026	1	0	1	0	
Alex Murphy	Republic of Ireland	DF	2025	11	2	13	2	
Kion Etete	England	FW	2025	0	5	5	0	
Ben Andreucci	Scotland	FW	2025	0	1	1	0	
David Abimbola	England	FW	2025–2026	1	3	4	0	
Daeshon Lawrence	England	FW	2025–	1	3	4	0	
Harrison Rice	England	MF	2025–	0	1	1	0	
Teddy Sharman-Lowe	England	GK	2025–2026	23	0	23	0	
Charlie Warren	England	FW	2025–	2	3	5	0	
Tyler Miller	United States	GK	2025–2026	9	0	9	0	
Richard Taylor	England	DF	2025–	8	6	14	1	
Oliver Smith	England	DF	2025–2026	1	1	2	0	
Nathan Broome	England	GK	2025–	1	0	1	0	
Sean Hogan	England	DF	2025–2026	1	0	1	0	
Toby Ritchie	England	MF	2025–	0	2	2	1	
Harley Irwin	England	MF	2025–	0	1	1	0	
Rob Apter	Scotland	MF	2026	9	4	13	0	
Corey Blackett-Taylor	England	MF	2026	5	2	7	2	
Johnny Kenny	England	FW	2026	11	3	14	6	
Ben Davies	England	DF	2026–	7	2	9	0	
Akin Famewo	England	DF	2026–	12	1	13	0	
Gaizka Larrazabal	Spain	U	2026–	14	2	16	1	
Luca Stephenson	England	DF	2026–	6	0	6	0	
Kyliane Dong	France	FW	2026–	5	8	13	0	
David Watson	Scotland	MF	2026–	0	2	2	0	
Ryan Hardie	Scotland	FW	2026–	0	8	8	0	
Samuel Iling-Junior	England	FW	2026–	9	6	15	0	
Lewis Brunt	England	DF	2026–	7	3	10	0	
Jayden Nelson	Canada	FW	2026–	0	6	6	0	
Theo Bair	Canada	FW	2026–	2	6	8	2	
Gavin Bazunu	Republic of Ireland	GK	2026–	8	0	8	0	
Atsuki Itō	Japan	MF	2026–	4	6	10	2	
Max Lott	England	MF	2026–	1	3	4	0	

== Notes ==
- A utility player is one who is considered to play in more than one position.
