= 2001–02 Bolton Wanderers F.C. season =

Bolton Wanderers
2001–02 season
- Chairman: Phil Gartside
- Manager: Sam Allardyce
- Stadium: Reebok Stadium
- Premier League: 16th
- FA Cup: Fourth round
- League Cup: Fifth round
- Top goalscorer: League: Michael Ricketts (12); All: Michael Ricketts (15)
- Highest home attendance: 27,351 (vs Arsenal, 29 April 2002)
- Lowest home attendance: 5,761 (vs. Walsall, 11 September 2001)
- Average home league attendance: 25,098
Home colours	Away colours

The 2001–02 season was the 123rd season in Bolton Wanderers F.C.'s existence, and was their first season back in the top-flight after a Three-year absence. It covers the period from 1 July 2001 to 30 June 2002.

== Season summary ==
Three wins from their first three Premiership games put newly promoted Bolton on top of the table, and manager Sam Allardyce was boasting (tongue-in-cheek) that his side were capable of winning their first-ever league title, but the strong start to the season was not followed up and in the end they finished 16th, just enough to avoid relegation.

== First-team squad ==
Squad at end of season

Note: Flags indicate national team as defined under FIFA eligibility rules; some limited exceptions apply. Players may hold more than one non-FIFA nationality.

No.	Pos.	Nation	Player
1	GK	ENG	Steve Banks
2	DF	FRA	Bruno Ngotty
3	DF	ENG	Mike Whitlow
4	DF	ISL	Guðni Bergsson (captain)
5	DF	SCO	Colin Hendry
6	DF	ENG	Paul Warhurst
7	FW	DEN	Bo Hansen
8	MF	DEN	Per Frandsen
9	FW	DEN	Henrik Pedersen
10	FW	ENG	Dean Holdsworth
11	MF	JAM	Ricardo Gardner
12	DF	ENG	Dean Holden
13	FW	FRA	Youri Djorkaeff
14	MF	IRL	Gareth Farrelly
15	MF	ENG	Kevin Nolan
16	FW	GER	Fredi Bobic (on loan from Borussia Dortmund)

No.	Pos.	Nation	Player
17	FW	ENG	Michael Ricketts
19	MF	ENG	David Norris
20	MF	ENG	Nicky Southall
21	FW	ENG	Rod Wallace
22	GK	FIN	Jussi Jääskeläinen
23	MF	FRA	Mario Espartero (on loan from Metz)
24	DF	ENG	Anthony Barness
25	DF	ENG	Simon Charlton
26	DF	ENG	Leam Richardson
28	MF	JAM	Jermaine Johnson
29	MF	DEN	Stig Tøfting
30	GK	ENG	Kevin Poole
32	MF	ENG	Jeff Smith
34	MF	GRE	Kostas Konstantinidis (on loan from Hertha Berlin)
38	MF	NIR	Wayne Buchanan
46	MF	JAM	Cleveland Taylor

=== Left club during season ===
Note: Flags indicate national team as defined under FIFA eligibility rules; some limited exceptions apply. Players may hold more than one non-FIFA nationality.

No.	Pos.	Nation	Player
16	FW	ENG	Ian Marshall (to Blackpool)
23	MF	SEN	Djibril Diawara (on loan from Torino)
27	FW	JPN	Akinori Nishizawa (on loan from Cerezo Osaka)

No.	Pos.	Nation	Player
42	GK	FIN	Jani Viander (on loan from HJK)
—	MF	ENG	Nicky Summerbee (to Manchester City)

=== Reserve squad ===
Note: Flags indicate national team as defined under FIFA eligibility rules; some limited exceptions apply. Players may hold more than one non-FIFA nationality.

No.	Pos.	Nation	Player
18	FW	ENG	Paul Wheatcroft
27	MF	TAH	Gérald Forschelet
31	FW	ITA	Emanuele Morini
33	MF	ENG	Ryan Baldacchino
35	GK	USA	Jeff Cassar

No.	Pos.	Nation	Player
37	DF	ENG	Nicky Hunt
39	MF	IRL	Ciaran Ryan
40	MF	ENG	Chris Downey
41	DF	IRL	Alan O'Hare

== Transfers ==
=== In ===
Date	Pos	Name	From	Fee
11 June 2001	MF	(England) Nicky Southall	(England) Gillingham	Free
3 July 2001	FW	(Denmark) Henrik Pedersen	(Denmark) Silkeborg	£650,000
17 September 2001	FW	(England) Rod Wallace	(Scotland) Rangers	Free
26 October 2001	GK	(England) Kevin Poole	(England) Birmingham City	Free
28 November 2001	MF	(Scotland) Derek Niven	(Scotland) Raith Rovers	Free
2 January 2002	GK	(France) Jeremy Bon	(France) Bordeaux	Free
28 January 2002	DF	(France) Bruno Ngotty	(France) Marseille	£500,000
1 February 2002	MF	(French Polynesia) Gérald Forschelet	(France) Cannes	Undisclosed
8 February 2002	MF	(Denmark) Stig Tøfting	(Germany) Hamburg	£250,000
13 February 2002	FW	(France) Youri Djorkaeff	(Germany) Kaiserslautern	Free

=== Out ===
Date	Pos	Name	To	Fee
14 June 2001	DF	(England) John O'Kane	(England) Blackpool	Free
14 June 2001	GK	(England) Matt Glennon	(England) Hull City	£50,000
2 July 2001	DF	(England) Robbie Elliott	(England) Newcastle United	Free
4 September 2001	MF	(England) Nicky Summerbee	(England) Manchester City	Free
7 January 2002	FW	(England) Ian Marshall	(England) Blackpool	Free

=== Loan in ===
Date	Pos	Name	Club	Until	Ref
22 June 2001	DF	(Senegal) Djibril Diawara	(Italy) Torino	29 January 2002	
16 July 2001	FW	(Japan) Akinori Nishizawa	(Japan) Cerezo Osaka	8 January 2002	
7 September 2001	DF	(France) Bruno Ngotty	(France) Marseille	27 January 2002	
19 September 2001	MF	(Jamaica) Jermaine Johnson	(Jamaica) Tivoli Gardens	25 March 2004	
16 November 2001	GK	(Finland) Jani Viander	(Finland) HJK	17 January 2002	
11 January 2002	FW	(Germany) Fredi Bobic	(Germany) Borussia Dortmund	11 May 2002	
21 February 2002	MF	(France) Mario Espartero	(France) Metz	11 May 2002	
26 March 2002	MF	(Greece) Kostas Konstantinidis	(Germany) Hertha Berlin	11 May 2002	
28 March 2002	GK	(United States) Jeff Cassar	(United States) Miami Fusion	11 May 2002	

=== Loan out ===
Date	Pos	Name	Club	Return	Ref
28 September 2001	FW	(England) Paul Wheatcroft	(England) Rochdale	28 October 2001	
6 November 2001	FW	(England) Ian Marshall	(England) Blackpool	6 January 2002	
23 November 2001	MF	(England) Jeff Smith	(England) Macclesfield Town	19 January 2002	
13 December 2001	GK	(England) Steve Banks	(England) Rochdale	1 May 2002	
28 January 2002	DF	(Republic of Ireland) Alan O'Hare	(England) Chesterfield	21 April 2002	
25 February 2002	FW	(England) Paul Wheatcroft	(England) Mansfield Town	25 February 2002	
28 February 2002	DF	(Scotland) Colin Hendry	(England) Preston North End	28 March 2002	
4 March 2002	MF	(England) David Norris	(England) Hull City	21 April 2002	
22 March 2002	MF	(Northern Ireland) Wayne Buchanan	(England) Chesterfield	21 April 2002	
17 April 2002	FW	(Denmark) Henrik Pedersen	(Denmark) Silkeborg	1 June 2002	

== Results ==
=== FA Premier League ===
==== Results per matchday ====
Matchday	1	2	3	4	5	6	7	8	9	10	11	12	13	14	15	16	17	18	19	20	21	22	23	24	25	26	27	28	29	30	31	32	33	34	35	36	37	38
Ground	A	H	H	A	H	A	A	H	H	A	A	H	A	H	A	A	H	A	H	H	A	H	A	H	A	H	A	H	A	H	A	H	A	H	H	A	H	A
Result	W	W	W	D	L	D	D	L	L	W	L	D	W	D	L	L	D	L	L	D	D	D	D	L	L	W	D	D	L	L	W	W	L	W	D	L	L	L
Position	1	1	1	1	2	1	1	4	8	6	8	9	8	9	10	12	12	14	15	15	14	16	16	17	18	17	17	16	17	18	16	15	16	14	15	16	16	16

Updated to match(es) played on 11 May 2002. Source: Statto.com
A = Away; H = Home; W = Win; D = Draw; L = Loss

Date	Opponents	H / A	Result F – A	Scorers	Attendance
18 August 2001	Leicester City	A	5 – 0	Nolan (2) 15', 41', Ricketts 33', Frandsen (2) 45', 83'	19,987
21 August 2001	Middlesbrough	H	1 – 0	Ricketts 39'	20,747
27 August 2001	Liverpool	H	2 – 1	Ricketts 27', Holdsworth 90'	27,205
8 September 2001	Leeds United	A	0 – 0		40,153
15 September 2001	Southampton	H	0 – 1		24,378
19 September 2001	Blackburn Rovers	A	1 – 1	Wallace 69'	25,949
22 September 2001	Arsenal	A	1 – 1	Ricketts 83'	38,014
29 September 2001	Sunderland	H	0 – 2		24,520
13 October 2001	Newcastle United	H	0 – 4		25,631
20 October 2001	Manchester United	A	2 – 1	Nolan 35', Ricketts 84'	67,559
27 October 2001	Aston Villa	A	2 – 3	Ricketts (2) 2', 75'	33,599
3 November 2001	Everton	H	2 – 2	Frandsen 10', Ricketts 90'	27,343
18 November 2001	Ipswich Town	A	2 – 1	Bergsson 6', Ricketts 25'	22,335
24 November 2001	Fulham	H	0 – 0		23,848
3 December 2001	Tottenham Hotspur	A	2 – 3	Ricketts 8', Wallace 56'	32,971
8 December 2001	Derby County	A	0 – 1		25,712
15 December 2001	Charlton Athletic	H	0 – 0		20,834
23 December 2001	Chelsea	A	1 – 5	Nolan 3'	34,063
26 December 2001	Leeds United	H	0 – 3		27,060
29 December 2001	Leicester City	H	2 – 2	Nolan 34', Ricketts 90'	23,037
1 January 2002	Liverpool	A	1 – 1	Nolan 78'	43,710
12 January 2002	Chelsea	H	2 – 2	Ricketts 56', Nolan 79'	23,891
19 January 2002	Middlesbrough	A	1 – 1	Hansen 73'	26,104
29 January 2002	Manchester United	H	0 – 4		27,350
2 February 2002	Newcastle United	A	2 – 3	Gardner 19', Southall 34'	52,094
9 February 2002	West Ham United	H	1 – 0	Gardner 38'	24,342
23 February 2002	Southampton	A	0 – 0		31,380
2 March 2002	Blackburn Rovers	H	1 – 1	Wallace 45'	27,203
5 March 2002	Sunderland	A	0 – 1		43,011
16 March 2002	Derby County	H	1 – 3	Gardner 46'	25,893
23 March 2002	Charlton Athletic	A	2 – 1	Djorkaeff (2) 15', 39'	26,358
30 March 2002	Aston Villa	H	3 – 2	Delaney 8'(og), Bobic 40', Nolan 76'	24,600
1 April 2002	Everton	A	1 – 3	Ngotty 75'	39,784
6 April 2002	Ipswich Town	H	4 – 1	Bobic (3) 2', 30', 38', Djorkaeff 35'	25,817
20 April 2002	Tottenham Hotspur	H	1 – 1	Holdsworth 71'	25,817
23 April 2002	Fulham	A	0 – 3		18,107
29 April 2002	Arsenal	H	0 – 2		27,351
11 May 2002	West Ham United	A	1 – 2	Djorkaeff	35,546

Pos	Team	Pld	W	D	L	GF	GA	GD	Pts	Qualification or relegation
14	Charlton Athletic	38	10	14	14	38	49	−11	44	
15	Everton	38	11	10	17	45	57	−12	43	
16	Bolton Wanderers	38	9	13	16	44	62	−18	40	
17	Sunderland	38	10	10	18	29	51	−22	40	
18	Ipswich Town (R)	38	9	9	20	41	64	−23	36	UEFA Cup QR and relegation to the First Division (Note: Ipswich Town qualified for the UEFA Cup qualifying as the winners of Premiership Fair Play League by The Football Association, and as one of the UEFA Fair Play ranking winners.)

Source: Premier League
Rules for classification: 1) points; 2) goal difference; 3) number of goals scored.
(R) Relegated

=== FA Cup ===
Date	Round	Opponents	H / A	Result F – A	Scorers	Attendance
16 January 2002	Round 3	Stockport County	A	4 – 1	Bergsson 36', Fradin 42'(og), Frandsen 73', Ricketts 85'	5,821
5 February 2002	Round 4	Tottenham Hotspur	A	0 – 4		27,093

=== League Cup ===
Date	Round	Opponents	H / A	Result F – A	Scorers	Attendance
11 September 2001	Round 2	Walsall	H	4 – 3 (aet)	Ricketts 68', Holdsworth 80', Nishizawa 90', Pedersen 97'	5,761
8 October 2001	Round 3	Nottingham Forest	H	1 – 0	Wallace 3'	6,881
27 November 2001	Round 4	Southampton	H	2 – 2 (6 – 5 on penalties)	Holdsworth 55' (pen), Ricketts 110'	8,404
11 December 2001	Round 5	Tottenham Hotspur	A	0 – 6		28,430

== Statistics ==
=== Appearances ===
Bolton used a total of 35 players during the season.

P	Player	Position	PL	FAC	LC	Total
1	(Finland) Jussi Jääskeläinen	Goalkeeper	34 (0)	1 (0)	3 (0)	38 (0)
2	(England) Kevin Nolan	Midfielder	34 (1)	1 (1)	1 (1)	36 (3)
3	(England) Simon Charlton	Defender	35 (1)	0 (0)	1 (0)	36 (1)
4	(Jamaica) Ricardo Gardner	Midfielder	29 (2)	2 (0)	0 (1)	31 (1)
5	(Iceland) Guðni Bergsson	Defender	29 (0)	2 (0)	0 (0)	31 (0)
6	(Jamaica) Ricardo Gardner	Midfielder	31 (1)	0 (0)	0 (0)	31 (1)
7	(England) Mike Whitlow	Defender	28 (1)	1 (0)	0 (1)	29 (2)
8	(England) Michael Ricketts	Striker	26 (12)	1 (1)	0 (3)	27 (16)
9	(Denmark) Per Frandsen	Midfielder	25 (5)	0 (0)	1 (0)	26 (5)
10	(France) Bruno Ngotty	Defender	24 (2)	0 (0)	2 (1)	26 (3)
11	(England) Paul Warhurst	Defender/Midfielder	25 (0)	0 (0)	1 (0)	26 (0)
12	(England) Anthony Barness	Defender	19 (6)	2 (0)	2 (0)	23 (6)
13=	(England) Nicky Southall	Defender/Midfielder	10 (8)	2 (0)	4 (0)	16 (8)
13=	(England) Rod Wallace	Striker	14 (6)	1 (0)	1 (2)	16 (8)
15	(Republic of Ireland) Gareth Farrelly	Midfielder	11 (7)	2 (0)	3 (0)	16 (7)
16	(Denmark) Bo Hansen	Striker	10 (7)	2 (0)	2 (0)	14 (7)
17	(Germany) Fredi Bobic	Striker	14 (2)	0 (0)	0 (0)	14 (2)
18	(England) Dean Holdsworth	Striker	9 (22)	0 (1)	3 (1)	12 (24)
19	(France) Youri Djorkaeff	Midfielder/Striker	12 (0)	0 (0)	0 (0)	12 (0)
20	(Denmark) Henrik Pedersen	Streiker	5 (6)	2 (0)	1 (1)	8 (7)
21	(England) Delroy Facey	Striker	1 (8)	2 (0)	0 (0)	3 (8)
22	(Jamaica) Jermaine Johnson	Midfielder	4 (6)	1 (1)	2 (0)	7 (7)
23	(Scotland) Colin Hendry	Defender	3 (0)	0 (0)	4 (0)	7 (0)
24	(Senegal) Djibril Diawara	Defender	4 (5)	0 (0)	2 (0)	6 (5)
25	(Denmark) Stig Tøfting	Midfielder	6 (0)	0 (0)	0 (0)	6 (0)
26=	(England) Kevin Poole	Goalkeeper	3 (0)	0 (0)	0 (0)	3 (0)
26=	(Greece) Kostas Konstantinidis	Defender	3 (0)	0 (0)	0 (0)	3 (0)
26=	(Japan) Akinori Nishizawa	Striker	0 (0)	0 (0)	3 (0)	3 (0)
29=	(England) Ian Marshall	Defender/Striker	0 (1)	0 (0)	2 (0)	2 (1)
29=	(England) David Norris	Midfielder	0 (0)	1 (0)	1 (1)	2 (1)
29=	(England) Leam Richardson	Midfielder	0 (1)	0 (0)	2 (0)	2 (1)
32	(England) Steve Banks	Goalkeeper	1 (0)	1 (0)	0 (0)	2 (0)
33=	(England) Dean Holden	Defender	0 (0)	0 (0)	1 (0)	1 (0)
33=	(Finland) Jani Viander	Goalkeeper	0 (0)	1 (0)	0 (0)	1 (0)
34=	(Northern Ireland) Wayne Buchanan	Midfielder	0 (0)	0 (1)	0 (0)	0 (1)
34	(England) Cleveland Taylor	Midfielder	0 (0)	0 (1)	0 (0)	0 (1)

=== Top scorers ===
P	Player	Position	PL	FAC	LC	Total
1	(England) Michael Ricketts	Striker	12	1	2	15
2	(England) Kevin Nolan	Midfielder	8	0	0	8
3=	(Germany) Fredi Bobic	Striker	4	0	0	4
3=	(France) Youri Djorkaeff	Midfielder/Striker	4	1	0	4
3=	(England) Dean Holdsworth	Striker	2	0	2	4
3=	(England) Rod Wallace	Striker	3	0	1	4
