= Ronald Bolton =

Ronald Bolton may refer to:

- Ronald Bolton (fl. 1898–1899), footballer for Bolton Wanderers, see List of Bolton Wanderers F.C. players (1–24 appearances)
- Ronnie Bolton (born 1938), English footballer, see List of AFC Bournemouth players
- Ron Bolton (American football) (born 1950), NFL defensive back

== See also ==
- Ron Bolton
