= Kevin Nolan =

English football manager (born 1982)

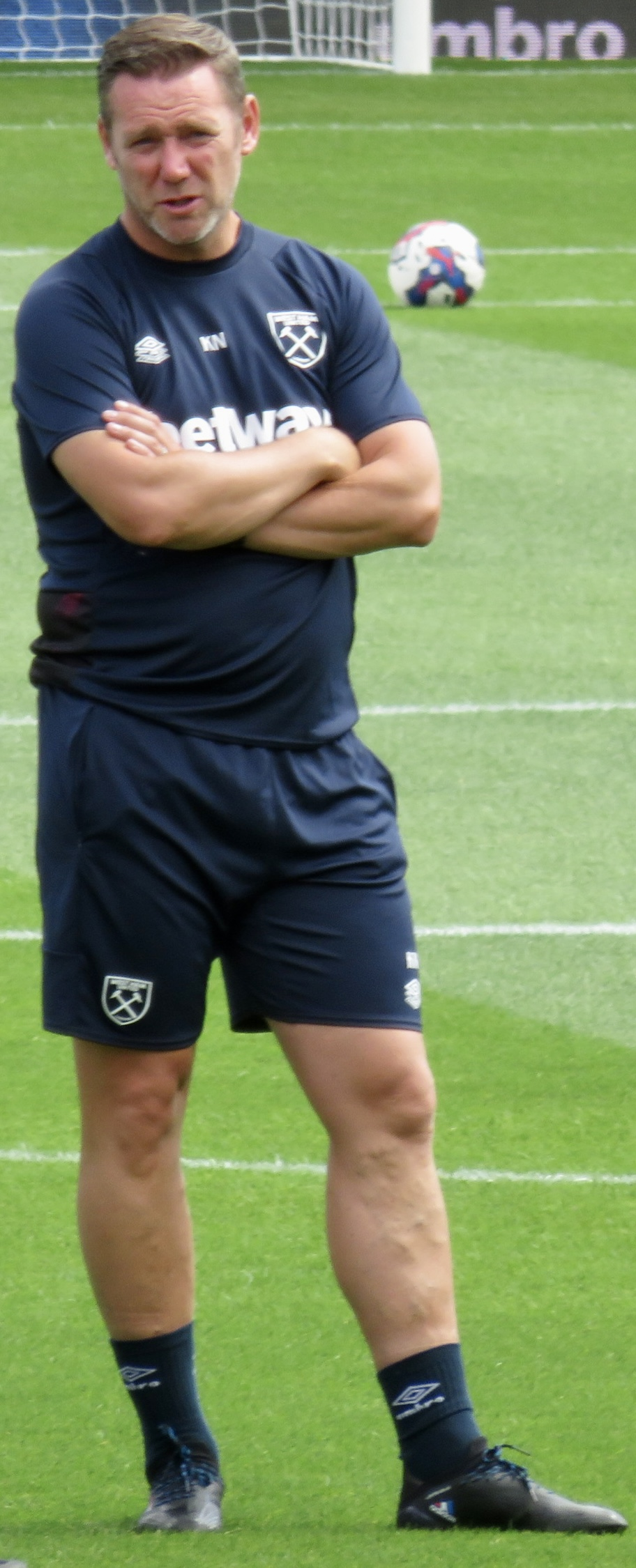
- Nolan coaching West Ham United in 2022

Personal information
- Full name: Kevin Anthony Jance Nolan
- Date of birth: 24 June 1982 (age 44)
- Place of birth: Liverpool, England
- Height: 6 ft 0 in (1.83 m)
- Position: Midfielder

Youth career
- 1997–1999: Bolton Wanderers

Senior career*
Years	Team	Apps	(Gls)
1999–2009	Bolton Wanderers	296	(40)
2009–2011	Newcastle United	85	(29)
2011–2015	West Ham United	141	(30)
2016	Leyton Orient	14	(0)
2017–2018	Notts County	0	(0)
Total		536	(99)

International career
2002–2004	England U21	2	(0)

Managerial career
- 2016: Leyton Orient
- 2017–2018: Notts County
- 2024–2026: Northampton Town
- * Club domestic league appearances and goals

Kevin Anthony Jance Nolan (born 24 June 1982) is an English football manager and former player who was most recently manager of Northampton Town. He has represented England at under-21 level.

After growing up in Toxteth, Liverpool, Nolan signed for Bolton Wanderers at the age of 16. Part of the team that beat Preston North End in the 2001 First Division play-offs to gain promotion to the Premier League, he soon became a regular first-team player for the club. He scored as Bolton beat rivals Manchester United at Old Trafford in both of his first two seasons in the top tier of English football, as well as important goals that helped Bolton regularly finish in the top half of the Premier League table.

Nolan was also a first team regular as Bolton qualified for the UEFA Cup for the first time in the club's history—where they reached the knockout stages. Following the departure of Jay-Jay Okocha in 2006, Nolan was appointed as the team captain, and he led the team again to UEFA Cup qualification and, again, eventual progression to the knockout round of the competition.

Following the arrival of Gary Megson as Bolton manager, the team's and Nolan's performances were criticised by a section of the club's fans. This resulted in the midfielder completing a £4 million transfer to Newcastle United in the January 2009 transfer window. The team were relegated to the Championship at the end of the season, but his performances the following season were widely praised, as he scored 18 goals—including the first hat-trick of his career—to help the club gain promotion back to the Premier League as the division's champions. Following promotion, Nolan was promoted to club captain.

In the summer of 2011 Nolan joined West Ham United on a five-year contract, joining up again with Sam Allardyce, his former manager at Bolton. He was appointed captain soon after his arrival and led the team to an instant return to the Premier League. Nolan left West Ham United by mutual consent in August 2015, and the following January he took over as player-manager at Leyton Orient, losing his managerial role in April. In January 2017, he took the same position at Notts County. On 26 August 2018, Nolan parted company with Notts County.

== Early life ==
Born on 24 June 1982 in Liverpool, Merseyside, Nolan was brought up by a football-playing family in Toxteth, and wanted to be a footballer from a young age. He attended Liverpool Blue Coat School and by 1996 was playing for the City of Liverpool's schoolboys team. As a child, he supported Celtic and Liverpool, although conversely, his favourite players were Eric Cantona and Lee Sharpe of Manchester United.

== Club career ==
=== Bolton Wanderers ===
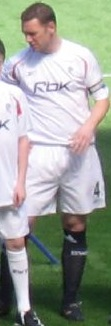
Nolan lining up for Bolton Wanderers in 2008

Nolan was invited to a Bolton Wanderers youth team training session by a friend, and was soon signed up to the club's books. At the age of 16, he was handed a year-to-year contract, coinciding with the opening of Bolton's academy. A year later, he signed professional terms and made his first team debut. He played the whole match as Bolton Wanderers beat Preston North End in the First Division play-off, winning promotion to the Premier League.

In the 2001–02 season, his first in the Premier League, Nolan scored eight league goals, including two at Leicester City on the opening day of the season. He also scored Bolton's first goal as they beat Manchester United 2–1 at Old Trafford. The following season, he scored at Old Trafford again; Nolan's only goal of the season was the winner at Old Trafford in the game which saw Bolton record their second shock win at the ground in as many seasons, this time winning 1–0. Manchester United manager Alex Ferguson was reported to have been seen scouting Nolan. Despite that win early in the season, the club were only saved from relegation from the Premier League on the final day of the season with a win against Middlesbrough.

In the 2003–04 season, Nolan's goals against Aston Villa and Tottenham Hotspur helped Bolton finish eighth in the league. He also scored as the club beat Villa 5–2 in the semi-finals of the League Cup, and was part of the team that was defeated 2–1 by Middlesbrough in the final. Despite this defeat, Nolan's goals—a career-best 12 in all competitions—helped Bolton to their highest top flight finishing position in over forty years.

The following season, Nolan was part of the team who reached the FA Cup quarter-final, before being defeated by Arsenal at the Reebok Stadium. Bolton also progressed in the league, with a 1–1 draw with Portsmouth in the final game of the season, and Nolan's four league goals helping to secure UEFA Cup qualification for the first time in their history. The club reached the last 32 of the UEFA Cup the following season; Nolan's goal in the first round defeat of Lokomotiv Plovdiv helped them through the group stages. He scored the winner as the club overcame Zenit St. Petersburg 1–0 in the group stages, and a further nine in the league to help Bolton finish eighth, missing out on European qualification.

The 2006–07 season saw Nolan take over from the departed Jay-Jay Okocha as club captain. His three league goals helped Bolton to again qualify for the UEFA Cup. Nolan's long throw-in set up a goal, which helped Bolton draw 2–2 away to German champions Bayern Munich, who dominated the match. Despite reaching the first knockout round, Bolton's league form suffered as they were pulled into a relegation fight, eventually finishing the season one point above the relegation zone in 16th. Nolan scored in the 2–0 win over Sunderland in May that virtually secured the club's Premier League status.

Having made 323 league appearances for the club, in January 2009 following perceived criticism of his performances by some of the club's supporters, Nolan began talks with representatives of Newcastle United over a move to the north-east club.

=== Newcastle United ===
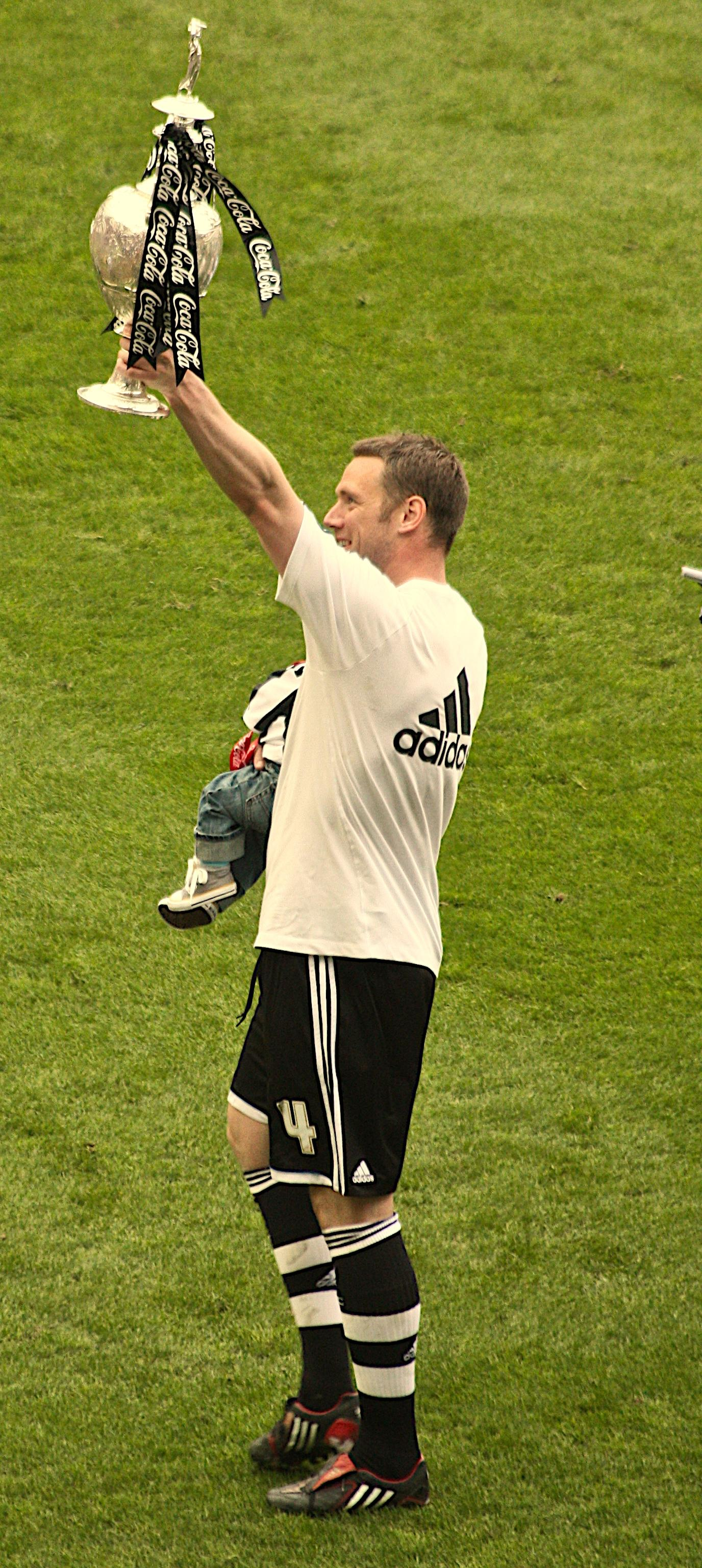
Nolan holding the Championship trophy aloft in 2010

On 29 January 2009, Newcastle agreed a £4 million fee with Bolton Wanderers, and Nolan completed his move that the same day, signing a 4 1/2-year contract. On 22 February, Nolan received his first red card playing for Newcastle United in a home match against Everton for a two-footed foul on Victor Anichebe. At the end of the season, Newcastle were relegated to the English Championship. Nolan was noted as one of the more vocal Newcastle players over the summer, demanding an end to the off the field distractions at the club, and suggesting the club should be looking to acquire players for an immediate return to the Premier League.

Nolan played a key role in Newcastle's push for promotion the following season; he scored his first league goal for Newcastle on 22 August against Crystal Palace, and the first hat-trick of his career, as part of a 4–0 away win against Ipswich Town on 26 September. Nolan captained Newcastle for the first time in a 5–1 win against Cardiff City taking over for the absent Nicky Butt and Alan Smith. After an 11-game goal drought, Nolan picked up his 11th league goal of the season on 20 February against Preston North End in a 3–0 win. He followed this up with the final goal in Newcastle's 6–1 home drubbing of Barnsley two games later. He was voted as the Championship Player of the Year at the Football League Awards on 16 March. On 5 April 2010, Newcastle United secured automatic promotion to the Premier League, after fellow contenders Nottingham Forest failed to beat Cardiff City. Newcastle took to the field hours later, in front of 48,750 fans, and Nolan scored the winner with a scissor-kick in the 2–1 win over Sheffield United.

Nolan was named as the new Newcastle United club captain for the 2010–11 season, succeeding the retired Nicky Butt. Nolan scored his first goals of the season as he netted a brace in Newcastle's 6–0 win against Aston Villa in their first home game. On 31 October 2010, Nolan scored his first Premier League hat-trick, achieving the feat in the Tyne–Wear derby against Sunderland in a 5–1 home win. Nolan scored the opener against Liverpool in new manager Alan Pardew's first game in charge on 11 December 2010, which Newcastle went on to win 3–1. Nolan scored the opening goal in the second derby of the season against Sunderland on 16 January, which finished 1–1. On 26 February 2011, Nolan scored his 50th Premier League goal, against his former club, Bolton Wanderers at St James' Park, which finished 1–1.

=== West Ham United ===
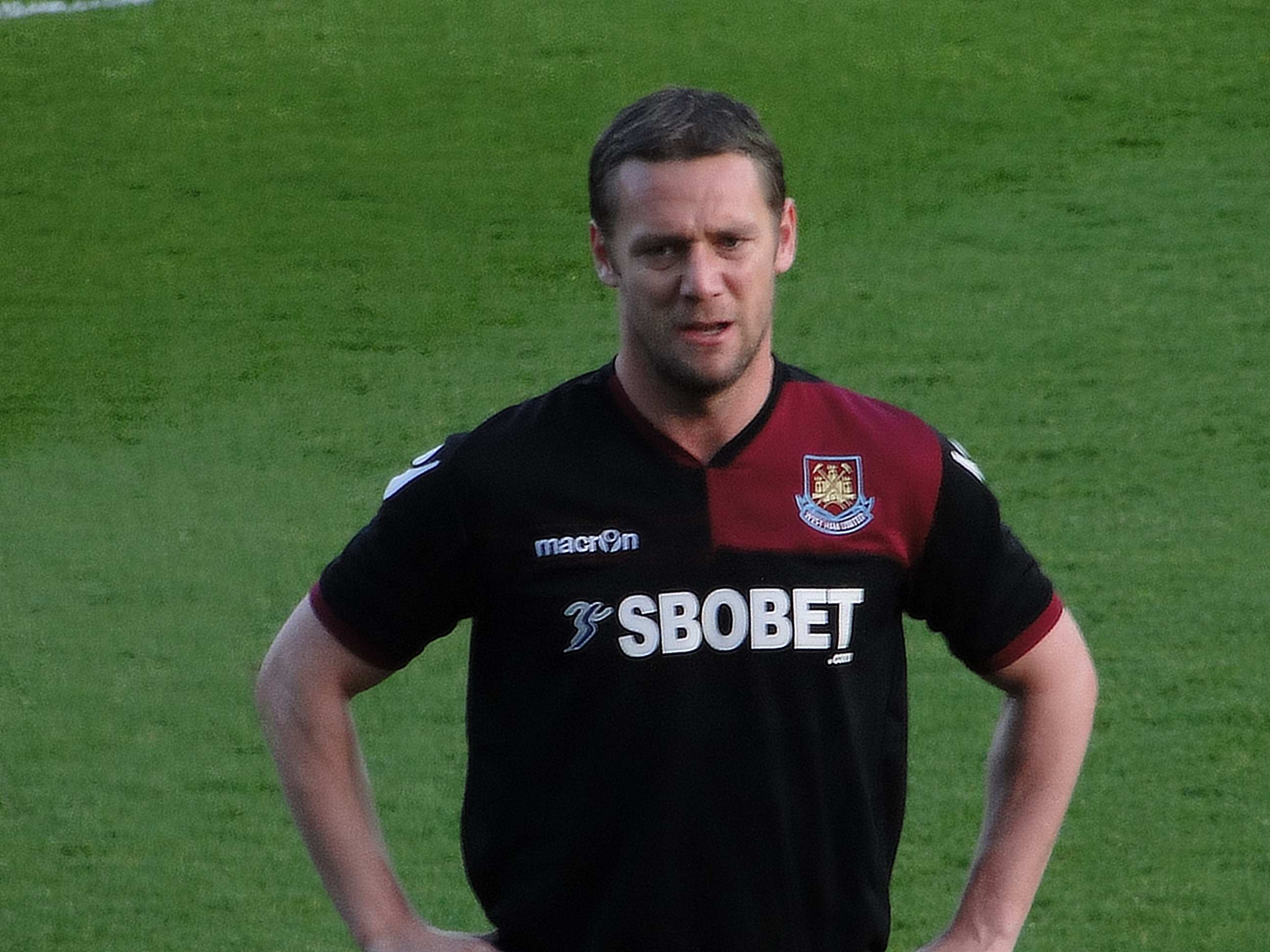
Nolan warming up for West Ham United in 2012

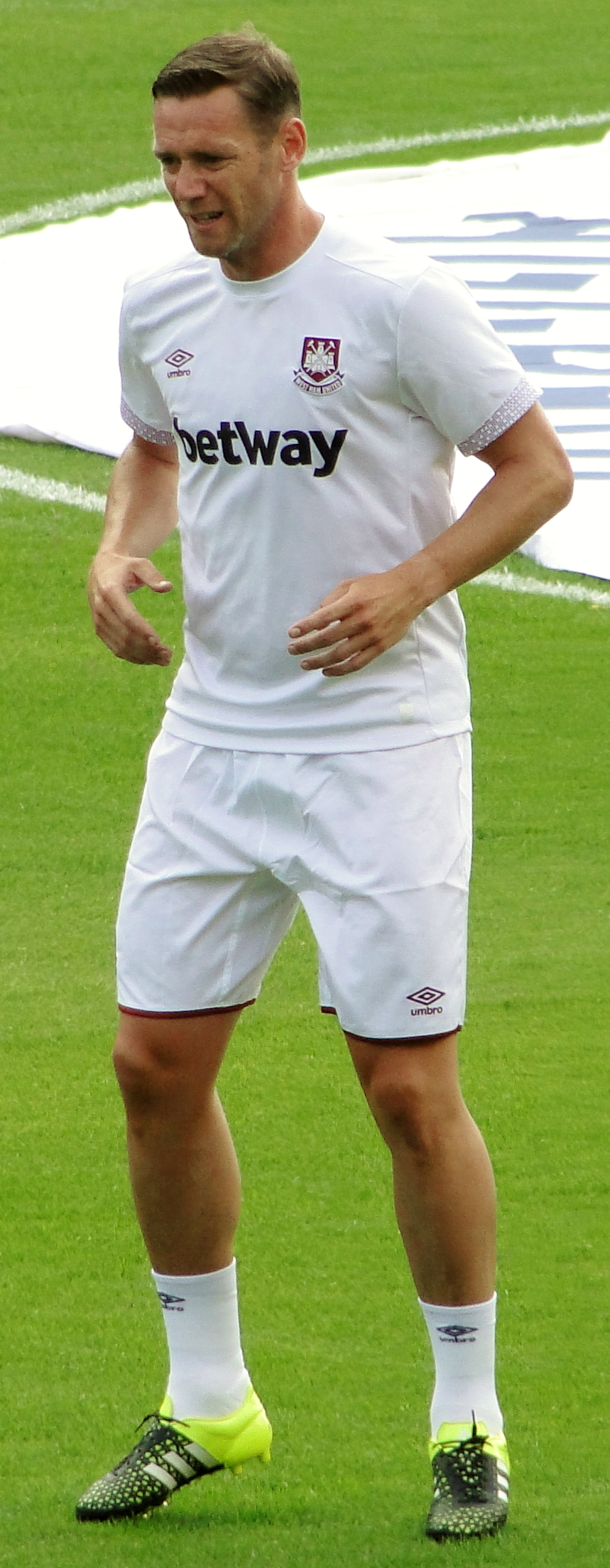
Nolan warming up for West Ham United in 2015

West Ham confirmed the signing of Nolan on 16 June 2011 for an undisclosed fee on a five-year contract, taking over the vacant number 4 shirt. Due to the departure of the previous West Ham captain, Matthew Upson, who moved to Stoke City, Nolan was immediately made captain. His league debut came on 7 August 2011 in a 1–0 home defeat to Cardiff City. Nolan scored his first goal for West Ham on 13 August 2011 in a 1–0 away win against Doncaster Rovers; his first home goal coming on 26 November, when scored a 25-yard volley in a 3–1 win against Derby County. On 7 May 2012, en route to the play-off final at Wembley, Nolan scored his thirteenth goal for the club against Cardiff City in a 3–0 win, sealing West Ham's Wembley appearance. On 19 May 2012 he captained West Ham in the 2012 Championship play-off final against Blackpool. West Ham won the match 2–1 with goals from Carlton Cole and Ricardo Vaz Tê sending them back to the Premier League after a one-season absence.

Nolan continued his good form into the 2012–13 season and scored his first goal of the season on the opening day, scoring the only goal of the game in a 1–0 win against Aston Villa. On 1 September, he scored inside one minute during a 3–0 win at home to Fulham. He scored his third goal of the season on 22 September, rescuing a point for West Ham by scoring in added time in a 1–1 draw at home to Sunderland. On 20 April 2013, Nolan scored his 100th career goal, netting the second goal in a 2–0 home victory against Wigan Athletic. Nolan wrapped up the 2012–13 season by scoring his second Premier League hat-trick in a 4–2 win against Reading on 19 May 2013. This hat-trick meant that Nolan had scored 10 league goals in a season for the fourth season in succession.

Nolan started the 2013–14 campaign by scoring in the first game of the season again, in a 2–0 home win against Cardiff City. West Ham struggled in the first half of the season and Nolan's influence on games was described as "low key". In December 2013 he was sent-off at Anfield in a defeat by Liverpool for a foul on Jordan Henderson. After serving a three match ban he was dismissed again, in only his second match back, for a foul on Fulham's Fernando Amorebieta in a 2–1 defeat at Craven Cottage. He was fined two weeks wages, £100,000, by West Ham with manager Sam Allardyce considering removing the captaincy of the club from Nolan. Nolan finished as top scorer for West Ham in the 2013–14 season.

At the start of the 2014–15 season he played in the first game, a 1–0 home defeat to Tottenham Hotspur but before their second game he fractured his shoulder in training, an injury which was expected to keep him out of football for at least six weeks. Nolan played 29 games for West Ham in the 2014–15 season, 10 after coming on as a substitute. Having been top scorer in the previous two seasons, he scored a single goal, in a 2–1 away win against West Bromwich Albion in December 2014. Nolan received criticism for some of his performances during the season, notably from some West Ham supporters and from Jack Sullivan, the son of West Ham's co-chairman, David Sullivan.

His last game for the club came on 22 August 2015 against AFC Bournemouth. Starting the game, Nolan was substituted for Matt Jarvis at half-time with his side already 2–0 behind in an eventual 4–3 home loss. Five days later, Nolan left West Ham United by mutual consent after four years at the club. He had played 157 games for West Ham in all competitions, scoring 31 goals.

== Coaching career ==
=== Leyton Orient ===
On 21 January 2016, Nolan was announced as the player-manager of Leyton Orient, signing a 2 1/2-year deal with the club. Two days later, he won his first match as manager in League Two, 2–0 at Wycombe Wanderers, with himself as an unused substitute. On 26 January, against Newport County at Brisbane Road, he made his debut in the 79th minute for Calaum Jahraldo-Martin, and sent in the cross from which the O's won a penalty kick which Jay Simpson converted for the only goal of the game. He made his first start for the club in the away game against Portsmouth on 6 February, where he played 70 minutes in a 1-0 victory for Leyton Orient.

Nolan's Orient team won three of the four league games in his first full month of management, only losing to league leaders, Northampton Town, and keeping three clean sheets. This led to him being nominated for February's manager of the month award, which eventually went to Chris Wilder of Northampton. On 12 April 2016, with the team two points off the play-offs, Nolan was relieved of his duties as manager of Orient, the role transferring to Andy Hessenthaler. He left the club altogether on 6 July.

=== Notts County ===
On 12 January 2017, Nolan was appointed manager of Notts County, replacing John Sheridan. He inherited a team that had lost its last ten matches and was a point from the relegation places in League Two. Two days later in his first game in charge, Notts County earned a goalless draw at home to Nottinghamshire rivals Mansfield Town. On 30 January, Nolan registered as a player, though he did not play during his time at Notts. Under his management, the team avoided relegation.

On 20 September 2017, with Notts County in second place in League Two, Nolan signed a new three-year contract. County owner Alan Hardy said: "Kevin has brought real pride, optimism and stability to this club which has not been seen for many years". In addition, he won the EFL League Two Manager of the Month award, the first honour of his managerial career.

On 26 August 2018, Nolan was dismissed as manager of Notts County after a six-game winless run.

=== West Ham United ===
In February 2020, Nolan was appointed as first team coach at West Ham United. Upon the departure of club manager, David Moyes in May 2024, Nolan left the club with other coaches and back-room staff.

=== England U20 ===
In August 2024, Nolan was appointed interim assistant head coach of the England U20 team, supporting Paul Nevin whom he had coached with at West Ham United.

=== Northampton Town ===
On 23 December 2024, Nolan was appointed as manager of Northampton Town on a two-and-a-half-year contract, replacing Jon Brady who had resigned three weeks earlier.

His first game as manager, on 26 December ended in a 4–1 defeat away to Reading. He was sacked on 9 March 2026 following a string of poor results which left the Cobblers in the relegation zone.

== International career ==
Nolan was called up to the England Under-18s and Under-21s. Reports suggested that Nolan could have been called up to the Republic of Ireland or Netherlands squads due to his ancestry.

In November 2012, Nolan was quoted as saying he has been left hurt by being regularly overlooked by England managers. He once held the record for the most Premier League appearances without winning an England cap (401 appearances), but has since been overtaken by former West Ham teammate, Mark Noble.

== Personal life ==
Nolan became engaged in 2005, and married his fiancée Hayley in the summer of 2008. The couple had their first child, a daughter, in November 2006. Their second child, a son, was born in January 2010.

== Career statistics ==
As of match played 6 May 2017

Appearances and goals by club, season and competition
Club	Season	League			FA Cup		League Cup		Europe		Other		Total	
Club	Season	Division	Apps	Goals	Apps	Goals	Apps	Goals	Apps	Goals	Apps	Goals	Apps	Goals
Bolton Wanderers	1999–2000	First Division	4	0	0	0	0	0	—		0	0	4	0
Bolton Wanderers	2000–01	First Division	31	1	4	2	0	0	—		2 (Note: Appearances in First Division play-offs)	0	37	3
Bolton Wanderers	2001–02	Premier League	35	8	2	0	2	0	—		—		39	8
Bolton Wanderers	2002–03	Premier League	33	1	2	0	1	0	—		—		36	1
Bolton Wanderers	2003–04	Premier League	37	9	2	1	5	2	—		—		44	12
Bolton Wanderers	2004–05	Premier League	36	4	4	0	2	0	—		—		42	4
Bolton Wanderers	2005–06	Premier League	36	9	3	0	2	0	7 (Note: Appearances in UEFA Cup)	2	—		48	11
Bolton Wanderers	2006–07	Premier League	31	3	2	1	1	1	—		—		34	5
Bolton Wanderers	2007–08	Premier League	33	5	0	0	1	0	5	0	—		39	5
Bolton Wanderers	2008–09	Premier League	20	0	1	0	1	1	—		—		22	1
Bolton Wanderers	Total		296	40	20	4	15	4	12	2	2	0	345	50
Newcastle United	2008–09	Premier League	11	0	—		—		—		—		11	0
Newcastle United	2009–10	Championship	44	17	2	0	2	1	—		—		48	18
Newcastle United	2010–11	Premier League	30	12	1	0	1	0	—		—		32	12
Newcastle United	Total		85	29	3	0	3	1	—		—		91	30
West Ham United	2011–12	Championship	42	12	0	0	1	0	—		3 (Note: Appearances in Championship play-offs)	1	46	13
West Ham United	2012–13	Premier League	35	10	2	0	1	0	—		—		38	10
West Ham United	2013–14	Premier League	33	7	0	0	2	0	—		—		35	7
West Ham United	2014–15	Premier League	29	1	4	0	0	0	—		—		34	1
West Ham United	2015–16	Premier League	2	0	—		—		3 (Note: Appearances in UEFA Europa League)	0	—		5	0
West Ham United	Total		141	30	6	0	4	0	3	0	3	1	157	31
Leyton Orient	2015–16	League Two	14	0	—		—		—		—		14	0
Notts County	2016–17	League Two	0	0	—		—		—		—		0	0
Career total			536	99	29	4	22	5	15	2	5	1	607	111

== Managerial statistics ==
As of match played 8 March 2026

Managerial record by team and tenure
Team	From	To	Record					Ref.
Team	From	To	P	W	D	L	Win %	Ref.
Leyton Orient	21 January 2016	12 April 2016	15	7	2	6	46.7	
Notts County	12 January 2017	26 August 2018	84	35	23	26	41.7	
Northampton Town	23 December 2024	9 March 2026	70	22	17	31	31.4	
Total			169	64	42	63	37.9	

== Honours ==
=== As a player ===
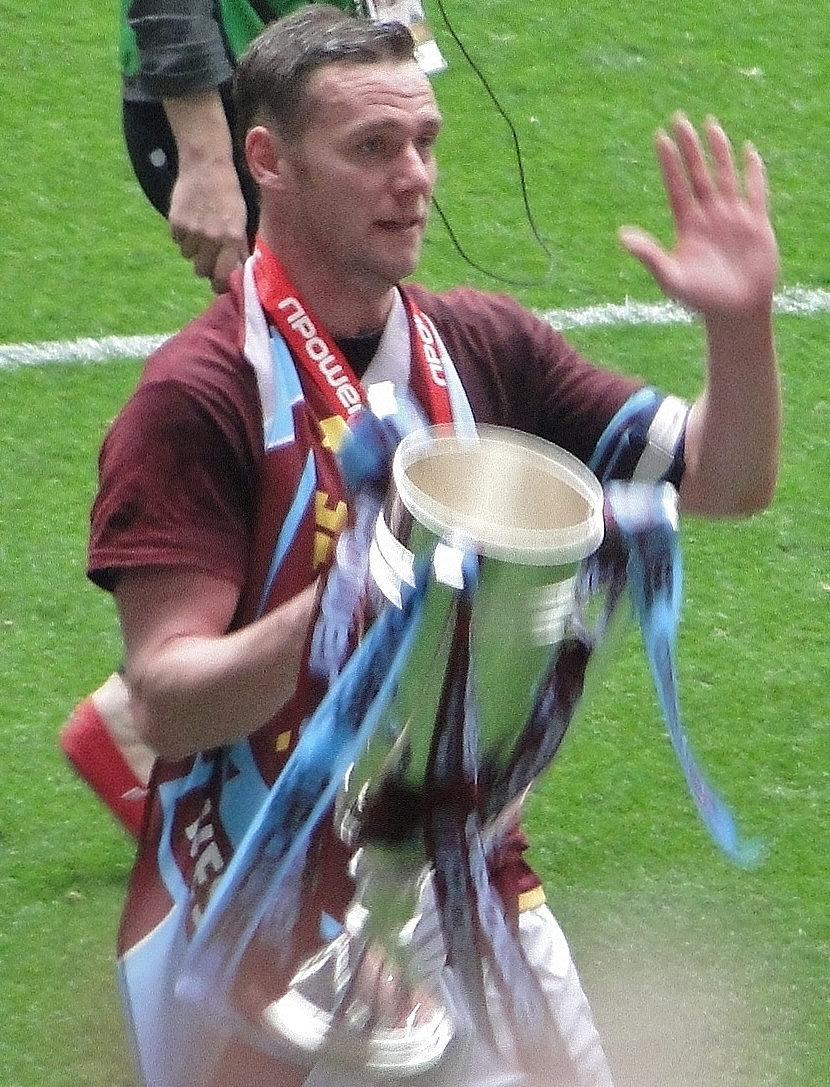
Nolan with the trophy after the 2012 Championship play-off final

Bolton Wanderers

- Football League First Division play-offs: 2001
- Football League Cup runner-up: 2003–04

Newcastle United

- Football League Championship: 2009–10

West Ham United

- Football League Championship play-offs: 2012

Individual

- Premier League Player of the Month: February 2006
- Football League Championship Player of the Year: 2009–10
- PFA Team of the Year: 2009–10 Championship
- Football League Championship Player of the Month: April 2010

=== As a manager ===
Individual

- EFL League Two Manager of the Month: September 2017
