= Ron Bolton =

Ron Bolton may refer to:

- Ron Bolton (American football) (born 1950), American football coach and former player
- Ron Bolton (politician) (fl. 2022), American politician

== Fictional characters ==
- Ron Bolton, in the US adult animated sitcom Mr. Pickles and its spin-off/sequel series Momma Named Me Sheriff, voiced by Will Carsola
