= Jani Viander =

Finnish footballer (born 1975)

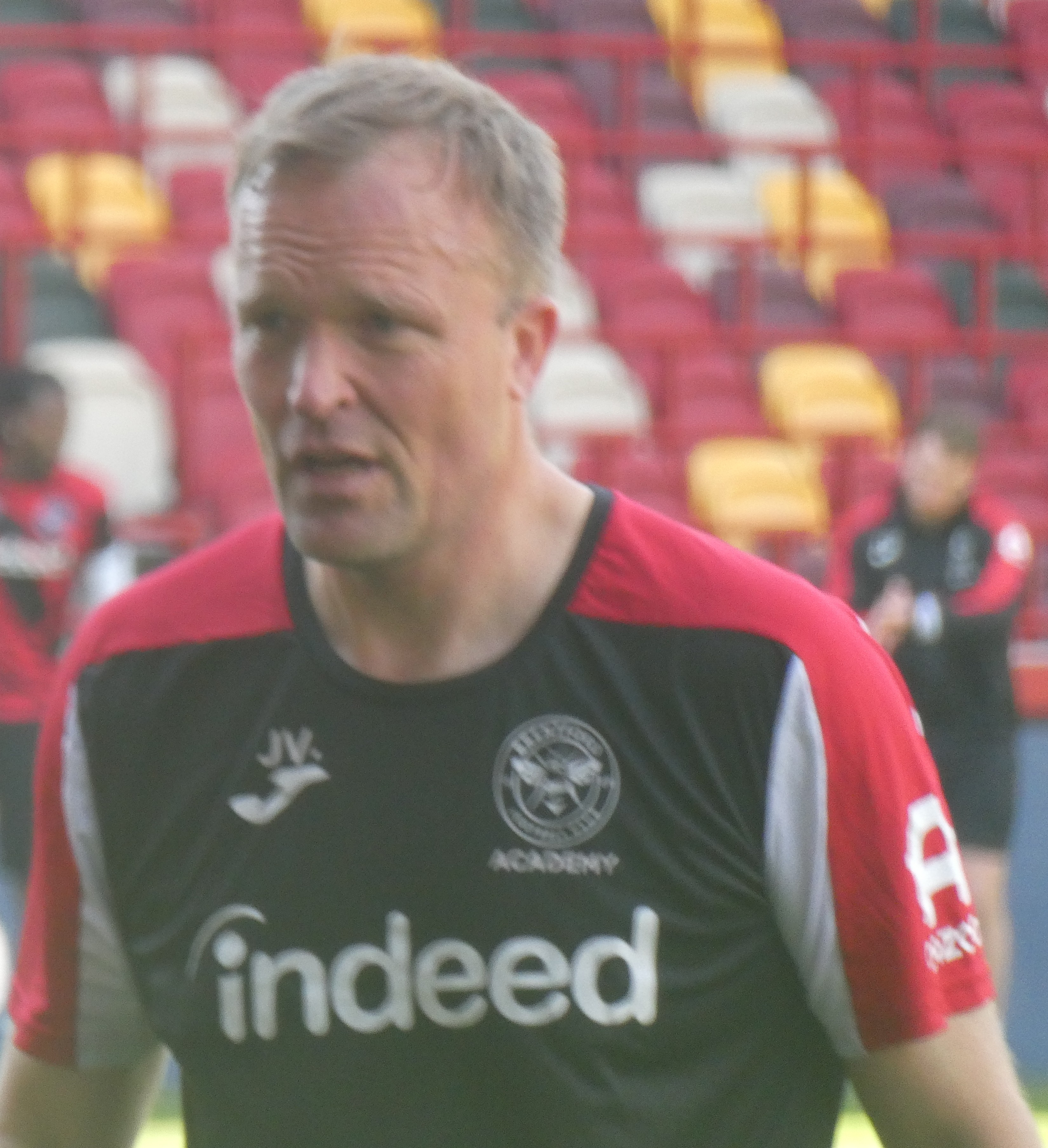
- Viander in 2026

Personal information
- Date of birth: 18 August 1975 (age 51)
- Place of birth: Tuusula, Finland
- Height: 1.96 m (6 ft 5 in)
- Position: Goalkeeper

Senior career*
Years	Team	Apps	(Gls)
1991–1992	TiPS Vantaa		
1992–1993	K-UP Kerava	20	(0)
1994–1995	FinnPa	39	(0)
1995	Ilves	6	(0)
1996	Jaro	27	(0)
1997	Jazz	2	(0)
1997–1998	KV Kortrijk	30	(0)
1998–2001	HJK Helsinki	83	(0)
2001–2002	→ Bolton Wanderers (loan)	0	(0)
2002–2003	Stoke City	0	(0)
2003	→ Midtjylland (loan)	2	(0)
2003	Plymouth Argyle	0	(0)
2004	Brentford	0	(0)
2004	Ashdod	15	(0)
2004	Aris Limassol	7	(0)
2005	RoPS	26	(0)
2006	Jaro	21	(0)
2007	AC Oulu	26	(0)
2008–2010	Klubi 04	1	(0)
2008–2010	HJK Helsinki	1	(0)
Total		305	(0)

International career
1999–2003	Finland	13	(0)
- * Club domestic league appearances and goals

Jani Viander (born 18 August 1975) is a Finnish former professional football goalkeeper who currently works as the Lead Academy Goalkeeper Coach at Premier League side Brentford. In a long career as a player, Viander played professionally in Finland, Belgium, England, Denmark, Israel, and Cyprus. He won 13 caps for Finland national team at international level.

== Playing career ==
Viander played 13 times for Finland national team. He used to play for clubs like HJK Helsinki, Bolton Wanderers and K.V. Kortrijk. With Bolton, his only appearance came in the FA Cup against Stockport County. He also joined Stoke City for a season, in which he did not feature in a single match, apart from being named on the substitutes bench.

He ended his long outland journey after returning to Finland to season 2005. He joined newly promoted RoPS, Rovaniemi, but he was not capable to keep them in Finnish Premier league. RoPS were relegated to first division and Viander left club to join Jaro. He played against 1. FC Kaiserslautern with HJK in the 1998–99 UEFA Champions League group stage in 1998.

== Coaching career ==
Viander began his coaching career in 2010, after being named HJK Helsinki's club's full-time goalkeeping coach. The following year, he was awarded the Coach of the Year award by the Veikkausliiga. Viander was named goalkeeping coach for the Finland U21 side in 2011. In the summer of 2012, Viander returned to England to take up the position of academy goalkeeping coach at Premier League side Norwich City. In April 2013, Viander returned to Brentford, to take up the role of Lead Academy Goalkeeper Coach.

== Personal life ==
Viander married British-born model Laura Duncan in June 2008.

== Career statistics ==
=== Club ===
Appearances and goals by club, season and competition
Club	Season	League			Cup		Total	
Club	Season	Division	Apps	Goals	Apps	Goals	Apps	Goals
K-UP Kerava	1993	Kakkonen	20	0	—		20	0
FinnPa	1994	Veikkausliiga	25	0	—		25	0
FinnPa	1995	Veikkausliiga	14	0	—		14	0
Ilves	1995	Veikkausliiga	6	0	—		6	0
Jaro	1996	Veikkausliiga	27	0	—		27	0
Jazz	1997	Veikkausliiga	2	0	—		2	0
KV Kortrijk	1997–98	Belgian Second Division	30	0	1	0	31	0
HJK	1998	Veikkausliiga	8	0	—		8	0
HJK	1999	Veikkausliiga	27	0	—		27	0
HJK	2000	Veikkausliiga	32	0	—		32	0
HJK	2001	Veikkausliiga	16	0	—		16	0
Bolton Wanderers (loan)	2001–02	First Division	0	0	1	0	1	0
Stoke City	2001–02	Second Division	0	0	0	0	0	0
Stoke City	2002–03	First Division	0	0	0	0	0	0
Midtjylland (loan)	2002–03	Danish Superliga	1	0	—		1	0
Plymouth Argyle	2003–04	Second Division	0	0	0	0	0	0
Brentford	2003–04	Second Division	0	0	0	0	0	0
Ashdod	2003–04	Israeli Premier League	15	0	2	0	17	0
Aris Limassol	2004–05	Cypriot First Division	7	0	—		7	0
RoPS	2005	Veikkausliiga	26	0	—		26	0
Jaro	2006	Veikkausliiga	21	0	—		21	0
AC Oulu	2007	Veikkausliiga	26	0	—		26	0
Klubi 04	2008	Kakkonen	0	0	—		0	0
Klubi 04	2009	Ykkönen	1	0	—		1	0
HJK	2010	Veikkausliiga	1	0	—		1	0
Career total			305	0	4	0	309	0

=== International ===
Appearances and goals by national team and year
National team	Year	Apps	Goals
Finland	1999	4	0
Finland	2000	3	0
Finland	2001	3	0
Finland	2002	2	0
Finland	2003	1	0
Total		13	0

== Honours ==
Stoke City

- Football League Second Division play-offs: 2002
