= Alan Beards =

English footballer (1932–2019)

Personal information
- Date of birth: 19 October 1932
- Place of birth: Normanton, England
- Date of death: 25 September 2019 (aged 86)
- Position: Winger

Senior career*
Years	Team	Apps	(Gls)
1950–1954	Bolton Wanderers	14	(2)
1954–????	Swindon Town		
- Stockport County
1957–1958	Grantham Town		
1958–????	Frickley Colliery		
- * Club domestic league appearances and goals

Alan Beards (19 October 1932 – 25 September 2019) was an English professional footballer who played as a winger. He made over 40 appearances in the Football League playing for Bolton Wanderers, Swindon Town and Stockport County.

== Playing career ==
Beards was born in Normanton, Yorkshire and played for Whitewood Juniors as a youth player before he began his professional football career with Bolton and he also played for Swindon Town and Stockport County and moved to Frickley Colliery in the Midland League in 1958, along with David Niven of Sheffield Wednesday.

== Death ==
Beards died at a hospital on 25 September 2019, aged 86.
