= Chris Downey (footballer) =

English footballer

Personal information
- Full name: Christopher Downey
- Date of birth: 19 April 1983 (age 43)
- Place of birth: England
- Position: Forward

Senior career*
Years	Team	Apps	(Gls)
–2003	Bolton Wanderers	1	(0)
2002	→ Sengkang Marine (loan)		
2003	Leigh RMI		
2004	Altrincham		
2004	Trafford		
2004–2006	Mossley		
2006–2007	Radcliffe Borough		
2007–2008	Flixton		
2008–2009	AFC Fylde		
- * Club domestic league appearances and goals

Chris Downey (born 19 April 1983) is an English retired footballer who is last known to have played for AFC Fylde in his home country from 2008 to 2009.

== Singapore ==
Loaned to Sengkang Marine of the Singaporean S.League in 2002 from Bolton Wanderers, Downey debuted in a 2–3 loss to SAFFC which worsened the Dolphins' travails, making it their fourth defeat in a row. Fortunately, the Englishman broke his duck in a hitting in a free-kick on the 26th minute to salvage a 2–2 tie with Geylang United.
