= Wayne Buchanan =

Northern Irish footballer

Personal information
- Full name: Wayne Bernard Buchanan
- Date of birth: 12 January 1982 (age 44)
- Place of birth: Banbridge, Northern Ireland
- Position: Defender

Team information
- Current team: North Shields Football Club

Youth career
- 1999–2001: Bolton Wanderers

Senior career*
| Years | Team | Apps | (Gls) |
| 2001–2003 | Bolton Wanderers | 0 | (0) |
| 2002 | → Chesterfield (loan) | 3 | (0) |
| 2003–2009 | Lisburn Distillery | 226 | (9) |
- Brisbane Olympic
- Gold Coast United
| 2010 | Gateshead | 2 | (0) |
| 2010–2013 | Blyth Spartans | 134 | (4) |
- Morpeth Town
- Ashington
| 2015 | South Shields | | |
| 2015–2016 | Sunderland RCA | 47 | (3) |
| 2016–2019 | Ashington | 112 | (5) |

International career
| 2002–2003 | Northern Ireland U21 | 5 | (0) |
| 2004 | Northern Ireland U23 | 1 | (0) |
| 2007 | Irish League XI | 1 | (0) |
- * Club domestic league appearances and goals as of 18:06, 10 February 2012 (UTC)

Wayne Buchanan (born 12 January 1982) is a Northern Irish footballer. He is the cousin of Chesterfield fc left-back David Buchanan.

== Career ==
=== Bolton Wanderers (and Chesterfield) ===
Buchanan started his career at Bolton Wanderers, making one appearance in the 2001–02 FA Cup fourth round against Tottenham Hotspur.

While at Bolton, he made 3 league appearances on loan at Chesterfield in 2002.

=== Lisburn Distillery ===
Moving back to Northern Ireland after his release from Bolton, he signed for Lisburn Distillery where he spend six years making 226 appearances many as captain.

=== Move to Australia ===
He moved to Australia at the end of the 2008–2009 season, where he trialed for Gold Coast United coming close to winning a contract two occasions.

=== Gateshead ===
Moving back to the United Kingdom in January 2010, he went on trial at Dundee before signing for Gateshead until the end of the 2009–2010 season. Buchanan made his debut for Gateshead on 13 February 2010 away at Hayes & Yeading United. Buchanan was released by Gateshead at the end of the 2009–10 season.

=== Blyth Spartans ===
On 6 August 2010 it was announced that Buchanan had signed for Conference North side Blyth Spartans following a successful trial period with the club. He went on to captain the club and receive a number of player of the year awards along the way, before leaving at the end of the 2012/13 season.

He later joined Morpeth Town. joining Ashington in January 2015. He moved to South Shields in July 2015, but moved to Sunderland RCA the following month. He rejoined Ashington in the 2016 close season, going on to captain the club and make over 100 appearances, receiving recognition by players and supporters with player of the year awards in 2018. A broken leg in August 2018 followed, before a return to action in December 2018. Buchanan signed for North Shields in July 2019
