= Djibril Diawara =

French-Senegalese footballer (born 1975)

Personal information
- Date of birth: 3 January 1975 (age 51)
- Place of birth: Dakar, Senegal
- Height: 1.85 m (6 ft 1 in)
- Position: Defender

Youth career
- 1989–1993: RCF Paris

Senior career*
Years	Team	Apps	(Gls)
1993–1997	Le Havre	58	(1)
1997–1998	Monaco	24	(0)
1998–2002	Torino	21	(0)
2001–2002	→ Bolton Wanderers (loan)	9	(0)
2002	Cosenza	8	(1)
Total		120	(2)
- * Club domestic league appearances and goals

Djibril Diawara (born 3 January 1975) is a retired French-Senegalese footballer.

== Career ==
He played for Le Havre, Monaco, Torino and Bolton Wanderers during his professional career.

Diawara played in Jean Tigana's talented Monaco side which famously put Manchester United out of the Champions League in 1998 on away goals after a 1–1 draw at Old Trafford.

He went on loan to Bolton in the Premier League in 2001 and made 9 league appearances, getting sent off once against Everton.

== Honours ==
Monaco

- Trophée des Champions: 1997
