= Mario Espartero =

French footballer (born 1978)

Personal information
- Date of birth: 17 January 1978 (age 48)
- Place of birth: Fréjus, France
- Height: 1.74 m (5 ft 9 in)
- Position: Defensive midfielder

Senior career*
| Years | Team | Apps | (Gls) |
| 1997–2000 | CS Louhans-Cuiseaux | 52 | (5) |
| 2000–2004 | Metz | 35 | (0) |
| 2002 | → Bolton Wanderers (loan) | 3 | (0) |
| 2004–2005 | La Louvière | 31 | (4) |
| 2005–2006 | Brussels | 20 | (1) |
| 2009 | SO Romorantin | 16 | (0) |
| Total | | 157 | (10) |
- * Club domestic league appearances and goals

Mario Espartero (born 17 January 1978) is a French former professional footballer who played as a defensive midfielder.

== Career ==
Born in Fréjus, Var, Espartero started his career at CS Louhans-Cuiseaux in the 1997–98 French Division 2, playing in the campaign that saw his club relegated. He helped the club on its way back to the 2nd division after winning the 1998-99 Championnat National, but again suffered relegation in the 1999–2000 French Division 2.

He moved to FC Metz in 2000. Although he was sparingly used in the 2000–01 French Division 1 matches, he became a starter near the end of the season, scoring two goals. In the next season, he started in 8 of the first 13 matches (one absence for a red card suspension), but was dropped to the bench and wanted to leave the club, also being considered a disruptive dressing room influence. He first had a trial at Blackburn Rovers but Graeme Souness opted against the signing as he was looking for a right midfielder. He later went for a trial at Rangers, snubbing a chance to join A.C. Milan. The move to the Scottish club was cancelled as he wanted to sign on a permanent basis and the Glasgow club wanted him on loan and he later joined Bolton Wanderers until the end of the season, with an option to make the deal permanent for £1.5 million. After only three Premier League matches, the club decided against the permanent move and Espartero returned to Metz for the 2002–03 season, now at Ligue 2.

Espartero played all the 90 minutes from the first 13 league matches, as well as the full match, including the extra time, in a Coupe de la Ligue game. However, due to a knee injury, he never played again for Metz and was sidelined the entire 2003–04 season. Then, he moved to Belgium to play for La Louvière.

One season later, he moved to FC Brussels, where he had disappointing performances and had problems off the field, prompting the club to announce his release months before the end of the season. After more than two years without a club, he had his final spell at French amateur club SO Romorantin.
