= Ron Bolton (American football) =

American football player and coach (born 1950)

No. 27, 28
- Position: Cornerback

Personal information
- Born: April 16, 1950 (age 76); Petersburg, Virginia, U.S.
- Listed height: 6 ft 2 in (1.88 m)
- Listed weight: 180 lb (82 kg)

Career information
- College: Norfolk State
- NFL draft: 1972: 5th round, 124th overall pick

Career history
- New England Patriots (1972–1975); Cleveland Browns (1976–1982)

Career NFL statistics
- Interceptions: 35
- Fumble recoveries: 8
- Defensive touchdowns: 1
- Stats at Pro Football Reference

Ronald Clifton Bolton (born April 16, 1950) is a former National Football League (NFL) defensive back and current college football coach. He is an alumnus of Norfolk State University, where he played college football. Bolton played from 1972 to 1975 for the New England Patriots and 1976 to 1982 for the Cleveland Browns.

During his coaching career, he served as an assistant coach at Norfolk State University, Delaware State University and Liberty University. Bolton is currently a defensive backs coach at Howard University.

Bolton has retired and spends his time in Virginia with his dog.
