= 2000–01 Bolton Wanderers F.C. season =

Bolton Wanderers
2000–01 season
- Chairman: Phil Gartside
- Manager: Sam Allardyce
- Stadium: Reebok Stadium
- First Division: 3rd (qualified for play-offs)
- Play-offs: Winners
- FA Cup: Fifth round
- League Cup: Second round
- Top goalscorer: League: Michael Ricketts (21); All: Michael Ricketts (24)
- Highest home attendance: 24,249 (vs. Grimsby Town, 20 February)
- Lowest home attendance: 4,957 (vs. Macclesfield Town, 27 August)
Home colours

The 2000–01 season was the 122nd season in Bolton Wanderers Football Club's existence, and their third successive season in the Football League First Division. It covers the period from 1 July 2000 to 30 June 2001.

== Season summary ==
Bolton finished third, qualifying for the play-offs. Two late goals gave the Wanderers a 3–0 win over local rivals Preston North End, thus allowing Bolton return to the Premiership after an absence of three seasons.

== Squad ==
Squad at end of season

Note: Flags indicate national team as defined under FIFA eligibility rules; some limited exceptions apply. Players may hold more than one non-FIFA nationality.

No.	Pos.	Nation	Player
1	GK	ENG	Steve Banks
2	DF	ENG	John O'Kane
3	DF	ENG	Mike Whitlow
4	DF	ISL	Guðni Bergsson
5	DF	ENG	Paul Warhurst
7	DF	ENG	Robbie Elliott
8	MF	DEN	Per Frandsen
9	FW	DEN	Bo Hansen
10	FW	ENG	Dean Holdsworth
11	MF	JAM	Ricardo Gardner
12	DF	ENG	Dean Holden
14	MF	IRL	Gareth Farrelly
15	MF	ENG	Kevin Nolan
16	DF	ENG	Jimmy Phillips
17	FW	ENG	Michael Ricketts
18	FW	ENG	Paul Wheatcroft
19	MF	ENG	David Norris
20	GK	ENG	Matthew Glennon
21	GK	ENG	Matt Clarke (on loan from Bradford City)
22	GK	FIN	Jussi Jääskeläinen
23	FW	FRA	Mickaël Kapriélian
24	DF	ENG	Anthony Barness

No.	Pos.	Nation	Player
25	DF	ENG	Simon Charlton
26	DF	ENG	Leam Richardson
27	MF	FRA	Franck Passi
28	FW	ENG	Ian Marshall
29	MF	ENG	Ryan Baldacchino
30	DF	SCO	Colin Hendry
31	FW	ITA	Emanuele Morini
32	DF	ENG	Jeff Smith
33	MF	ENG	Nicky Summerbee
34	GK	NIR	Tommy Wright
35	FW	ENG	Andy Campbell (on loan from Middlesbrough)
36	MF	NIR	Keiran O'Connor
37	DF	NIR	Gary Haveron
38	FW	ISL	Ólafur Páll Snorrason
39	MF	ENG	Danny Crumblehume
40	GK	SCO	James Evans
41	MF	NIR	Wayne Buchanan
42	MF	IRL	Ciaran Ryan
43	DF	ENG	Nicky Hunt
44	MF	ENG	Shaun Dootson
45	FW	ENG	Chris Downey

=== Left club during season ===
Note: Flags indicate national team as defined under FIFA eligibility rules; some limited exceptions apply. Players may hold more than one non-FIFA nationality.

No.	Pos.	Nation	Player
6	DF	RSA	Mark Fish (to Charlton Athletic)
13	DF	NCL	John Gope-Fenepej (on loan from Nantes)
21	GK	USA	Juergen Sommer (on loan from New England Revolution)

No.	Pos.	Nation	Player
29	FW	ENG	Isaiah Rankin (on loan from Bradford City)
32	MF	DEN	Carsten Fredgaard (on loan from Sunderland)
44	MF	IRL	Alan Power (released)

== Results ==
=== First Division ===
Date	Opponents	H / A	Result F – A	Scorers	Attendance
12 August 2000	Burnley	H	1 – 1	Frandsen 28' (pen)	20,662
19 August 2000	West Bromwich Albion	A	2 – 0	Rankin 23', Farrelly 75'	17,316
26 August 2000	Preston North End	H	2 – 0	Rankin 42', Ricketts 82'	19,954
28 August 2000	Tranmere Rovers	A	1 – 0	Whitlow 53'	9,350
9 September 2000	Huddersfield Town	A	3 – 2	Holdsworth 51', Ricketts (2) 70', 77'	12,248
12 September 2000	Grimsby Town	A	1 – 0	Ricketts 71'	3,732
16 September 2000	Portsmouth	H	2 – 0	Holdsworth 42', Ricketts 85'	14,113
23 September 2000	Blackburn Rovers	A	1 – 1	Hansen 88'	23,660
30 September 2000	Fulham	H	0 – 2		19,924
6 October 2000	Gillingham	A	2 – 2	Hansen 8', O'Kane 32'	9,311
14 October 2000	Wolverhampton Wanderers	H	2 – 1	Holdsworth 28', Bergsson 68'	15,585
17 October 2000	Nottingham Forest	H	0 – 0		13,017
21 October 2000	Stockport County	A	3 – 4	Marshall (2) 59', 84', Ricketts 69'	8,266
24 October 2000	Watford	A	0 – 1		11,799
28 October 2000	Crystal Palace	H	3 – 3	Bergsson 20', Ricketts 75' Frandsen 77'	12,879
31 October 2000	Queens Park Rangers	H	3 – 1	Bergsson 45, Elliott 62', Ricketts 65'	10,180
4 November 2000	Birmingham City	A	1 – 1	Ricketts 66'	20,043
11 November 2000	Barnsley	H	2 – 0	Ricketts 14', Gardner 28'	13,406
18 November 2000	Norwich City	A	2 – 0	Ricketts 58', Bergsson 74'	15,224
25 November 2000	Sheffield United	A	0 – 1		14,962
3 December 2000	Watford	H	2 – 1	Gardner 71', Marshall 79'	13,904
9 December 2000	Crewe Alexandra	H	4 – 1	Frandsen 20', Marshall 22', Bergsson 44', Nolan 89'	12,836
16 December 2000	Wimbledon	A	1 – 0	Holdsworth 78'	6,076
23 December 2000	Burnley	A	2 – 0	Ricketts (2) 53', 72'	19,552
26 December 2000	Sheffield Wednesday	H	2 – 0	Holdsworth 15', Hendry 51'	21,316
30 December 2000	West Bromwich Albion	H	0 – 1		18,985
1 January 2001	Preston North End	A	2 – 0	Farrelly 8', Ricketts 84'	15,863
13 January 2001	Tranmere Rovers	H	2 – 0	Hansen 16', Hill 20' (og)	15,493
20 January 2001	Sheffield Wednesday	A	3 – 0	Gardner 19', Ricketts 40', Marshall 88'	17,638
3 February 2001	Queens Park Rangers	A	1 – 1	Frandsen 87'	10,293
10 February 2001	Huddersfield Town	H	2 – 2	Bergsson 60', Frandsen 90'	14,866
13 February 2001	Portsmouth	A	2 – 1	Ricketts 48', Hansen 71'	11,377
20 February 2001	Grimsby Town	H	2 – 2	Bergsson 61', Hansen 74'	24,249
23 February 2001	Blackburn Rovers	H	1 – 4	Ricketts 84'	20,017
4 March 2001	Fulham	A	1 – 1	Frandsen 52'	16,468
10 March 2001	Gillingham	H	3 – 3	Frandsen 30', Patterson 45' (og), Holdsworth 51'	13,161
17 March 2001	Nottingham Forest	A	2 – 0	Holdsworth 61', Farrelly 90'	22,162
31 March 2001	Wimbledon	H	2 – 2	Elliott 28', Hendry 66'	14,562
3 April 2001	Stockport County	H	1 – 1	Hendry 11'	12,492
13 April 2001	Birmingham City	H	2 – 2	Bergsson 53', Holdsworth 55'	15,025
16 April 2001	Crystal Palace	A	2 – 0	Marshall 12', Summerbee 68'	16,268
18 April 2001	Crewe Alexandra	A	1 – 2	Holdsworth 62'	8,054
21 April 2001	Norwich City	H	1 – 0	Holdsworth 66'	17,967
28 April 2001	Barnsley F.C.	A	1 – 0	Ricketts 56'	13,979
1 May 2001	Wolverhampton Wanderers	A	2 – 0	Holdsworth 20', Ricketts 70'	16,242
6 May 2001	Sheffield United	H	1 – 1	Holden 90'	14,836

Pos	Team	Pld	W	D	L	GF	GA	GD	Pts	Qualification or relegation
1	Fulham (C, P)	46	30	11	5	90	32	+58	101	Promotion to the Premier League
2	Blackburn Rovers (P)	46	26	13	7	76	39	+37	91	Promotion to the Premier League
3	Bolton Wanderers (O, P)	46	24	15	7	76	45	+31	87	Qualification for the First Division play-offs
4	Preston North End	46	23	9	14	64	52	+12	78	Qualification for the First Division play-offs
5	Birmingham City	46	23	9	14	59	48	+11	78	Qualification for the First Division play-offs

Rules for classification: 1) Points; 2) Goal difference; 3) Goals scored
(C) Champions; (O) Play-off winners; (P) Promoted

=== Play-offs ===
Date	Round	Opponents	H / A	Result F – A	Scorers	Attendance
13 May 2001	Semi-final first leg	West Bromwich Albion	A	2 – 2	Bergsson 81', Frandsen 88' (pen)	18,167
17 May 2001	Semi-final second leg	West Bromwich Albion	H	3 – 0; 5 – 2 (agg)	Bergsson 10', Gardner 63', Ricketts 90'	23,515
28 May 2001	Final	Preston North End	Millennium Stadium	3 – 0	Farrelly 17', Ricketts 89', Gardner 90'	54,328

=== FA Cup ===
Date	Round	Opponents	H / A	Result F – A	Scorers	Attendance
6 January 2001	Round 3	Yeovil Town	H	2 – 1	O'Kane 44', Ricketts 90'	11,161
28 January 2001	Round 4	Scunthorpe United	H	5 – 1	Holdsworth (3) 27', 29', 47', Nolan (2) 51', 75'	11,737
17 February 2001	Round 5	Blackburn Rovers	H	1 – 1	Ricketts 62'	22,048
7 March 2001	Round 5 replay	Blackburn Rovers	A	0 – 3		20,318

=== League Cup ===
Date	Round	Opponents	H / A	Result F – A	Scorers	Attendance
22 August 2000	Round 1 first leg	Macclesfield Town F.C.	H	1 – 0	Holdsworth 84'	4,957
5 September 2000	Round 1 second leg	Macclesfield Town	A	1 – 3; 2 – 3 (agg)	Ricketts 71'	2,235

== Appearances ==
Bolton used a total of 35 players during the season.

P	Player	Position	FLFD	FAC	LC	Total
1	(Iceland) Guðni Bergsson	Defender	47 (0)	2 (0)	1 (1)	50 (1)
2	(Denmark) Bo Hansen	Midfielder/Striker	41 (3)	2 (1)	1 (1)	44 (5)
3	(Republic of Ireland) Gareth Farrelly	Midfielder	39 (5)	3 (0)	1 (0)	43 (5)
4	(Denmark) Per Frandsen	Midfielder	37 (3)	3 (1)	1 (1)	41 (5)
5	(England) Kevin Nolan	Midfielder	27 (6)	3 (1)	3 (0)	33 (7)
6	(England) Robbie Elliott	Defender	31 (3)	2 (0)	0 (0)	33 (3)
7	(Jamaica) Ricardo Gardner	Midfielder	29 (5)	2 (0)	0 (0)	31 (5)
8	(England) Dean Holdsworth	Striker	25 (9)	2 (1)	2 (0)	29 (10)
9	(England) John O'Kane	Defender	24 (2)	2 (0)	2 (0)	28 (2)
10	(Finland) Jussi Jääskeläinen	Goalkeeper	27 (0)	0 (0)	0 (0)	27 (0)
11	(England) Michael Ricketts	Striker	24 (17)	2 (2)	0 (1)	26 (20)
12	(Scotland) Colin Hendry	Defender	25 (0)	1 (0)	0 (0)	26 (0)
13	(England) Simon Charlton	Defender	21 (4)	3 (1)	0 (0)	24 (5)
14	(England) Anthony Barness	Defender	20 (3)	2 (0)	2 (0)	24 (3)
15	(England) Paul Warhurst	Defender	19 (1)	2 (0)	1 (0)	22 (1)
16	(France) Franck Passi	Midfielder	12 (9)	3 (0)	2 (0)	17 (9)
17	(England) Ian Marshall	Defender/Striker	13 (25)	3 (0)	0 (0)	16 (25)
18	(South Africa) Mark Fish	Defender	13 (1)	0 (0)	2 (0)	15 (1)
19	(England) Steve Banks	Goalkeeper	8 (1)	3 (0)	2 (0)	13 (1)
20	(England) Nicky Summerbee	Midfielder	9 (3)	3 (0)	0 (0)	12 (3)
21	(England) Isaiah Rankin	Striker	9 (7)	0 (0)	2 (0)	11 (7)
22	(England) Matt Clarke	Goalkeeper	11 (0)	0 (0)	0 (0)	11 (0)
23	(England) Mike Whitlow	Defender	7 (4)	1 (0)	0 (0)	8 (4)
24	(England) Leam Richardson	Defender	4 (7)	1 (0)	1 (1)	6 (8)
25	(England) Andy Campbell	Striker	3 (3)	0 (0)	0 (0)	3 (3)
26	(Northern Ireland) Tommy Wright	Goalkeeper	3 (1)	0 (0)	0 (0)	3 (1)
27=	(Italy) Emanuele Morini	Striker	1 (0)	1 (0)	0 (0)	2 (0)
27=	(England) David Norris	Midfielder	0 (0)	0 (0)	2 (0)	2 (0)
29	(Denmark) Carsten Fredgaard	Striker	1 (4)	0 (0)	0 (0)	1 (4)
30=	(England) Dean Holden	Defender	1 (0)	0 (0)	0 (0)	1 (0)
30=	(England) Jeff Smith	Midfielder	1 (0)	0 (0)	0 (0)	1 (0)
30=	(United States) Juergen Sommer	Goalkeeper	0 (0)	1 (0)	0 (0)	1 (0)
33	(England) Paul Wheatcroft	Striker	0 (0)	0 (2)	0 (1)	0 (3)
34	(France) John Gope-Fenepej	Defender	0 (2)	0 (0)	0 (0)	0 (2)
35=	(England) Chris Downey	Striker	0 (1)	0 (0)	0 (0)	0 (1)
35=	(England) Nicky Hunt	Defender	0 (1)	0 (0)	0 (0)	0 (1)

== Top scorers ==
P	Player	Position	FLFD	FAC	LC	Total
1	(England) Michael Ricketts	Striker	21	1	2	24
2	(England) Dean Holdsworth	Striker	11	1	3	15
3	(Iceland) Guðni Bergsson	Defender	10	0	0	10
4	(Denmark) Per Frandsen	Midfielder	8	0	0	8
5	(England) Ian Marshall	Defender/Striker	6	0	0	6
