= 1999–2000 Bolton Wanderers F.C. season =

Bolton Wanderers
1999–2000 season
- Chairman: Phil Gartside
- Manager: Colin Todd (until 22 September); Phil Brown (caretaker from 22 September to 19 October); Sam Allardyce (from 19 October)
- Stadium: Reebok Stadium
- First Division: 6th
- FA Cup: Semi-Final
- Worthington Cup: Semi-Final
- Top goalscorer: League: Eiður Guðjohnsen (13); All: Eiður Guðjohnsen (21)
- Highest home attendance: 21,671 v Manchester City; 28 August 1999
- Lowest home attendance: 3,673 v Gillingham; 21 September 1999

The 1999–2000 season was the 121st season in Bolton Wanderers F.C.'s existence, and their second successive season in the Football League First Division. It covers the period from 1 July 1999 to 30 June 2000.

== Results ==
=== Nationwide League Division One ===
Date	Opponents	H / A	Result F – A	Scorers	Attendance
7 August 1999	Tranmere Rovers	A	0 – 0		7,674
14 August 1999	Queens Park Rangers	H	2 – 1	Holdsworth 11' (pen), Guðjohnsen 64'	13,019
21 August 1999	Ipswich Town	A	0 – 1		17,696
28 August 1999	Manchester City	H	0 – 1		21,671
5 September 1999	Birmingham City	H	3 – 3	Frandsen (2) 14', 53', Holdsworth 90' (pen)	11,668
11 September 1999	Charlton Athletic	A	1 – 2	Johansen 12'	19,028
18 September 1999	Barnsley	A	2 – 2	Tuttle 4' (og), Gardner 85'	14,621
25 September 1999	Nottingham Forest	H	3 – 2	Gardner 32', Holdsworth 65' (pen), Cox 90'	14,978
2 October 1999	Swindon Town	A	4 – 0	Cox 9', Holdsworth 22', Gardner 26', Elliott 43'	6,711
9 October 1999	Wolverhampton Wanderers	A	0 – 1		18,665
16 October 1999	Huddersfield Town	H	1 – 0	Gardner 45'	16,603
19 October 1999	Crewe Alexandra	H	2 – 2	Guðjohnsen 44', Holdsworth 58'	12,676
24 October 1999	Norwich City	A	1 – 2	Gardner 74'	12,468
27 October 1999	Nottingham Forest	A	1 – 1	Guðjohnsen 20'	15,572
30 October 1999	Swindon Town	H	2 – 0	Taylor 87', Hansen 88'	12,486
6 November 1999	Crystal Palace	H	2 – 0	Guðjohnsen 64', Jensen 82'	12,744
14 November 1999	Sheffield United	A	2 – 1	Farrelly 2', Hansen 35'	10,013
20 November 1999	Grimsby Town	H	2 – 0	Hansen (2) 50', 69'	12,415
23 November 1999	Fulham	A	1 – 1	Guðjohnsen 15'	9,642
27 November 1999	Portsmouth	A	0 – 0		10,431
4 December 1999	Tranmere Rovers	H	2 – 3	Guðjohnsen 64', Taylor 77'	13,534
7 December 1999	Blackburn Rovers	A	1 – 3	Elliott 57'	21,046
18 December 1999	Stockport County	H	0 – 1		13,285
28 December 1999	West Bromwich Albion	H	1 – 1	Jensen 82'	16,269
3 January 2000	Walsall	A	0 – 2		6,873
15 January 2000	Queens Park Rangers	A	1 – 0	Jensen 64'	11,396
22 January 2000	Ipswich Town	H	1 – 1	Holdsworth 66'	11,924
5 February 2000	Blackburn Rovers	H	3 – 1	Bergsson 17', Johansen 39', Guðjohnsen 69'	17,687
8 February 2000	Port Vale	A	1 – 0	Guðjohnsen 77'	5,092
12 February 2000	Birmingham City	A	1 – 2	Johnston 20'	18,426
22 February 2000	Portsmouth	H	3 – 0	Taylor 12, Jensen 68', Elliott 77'	12,672
26 February 2000	Barnsley	A	1 – 1	Holdsworth 43' (pen)	14,604
4 March 2000	Charlton Athletic	H	0 – 2		15,000
7 March 2000	Crystal Palace	A	0 – 0		15,236
11 March 2000	Fulham	H	3 – 1	Holdsworth (2) 45' (pen), 50', Guðjohnsen 90'	12,761
14 March 2000	Stockport County	A	0 – 0		6,412
18 March 2000	Grimsby Town	A	1 – 0	Bergsson 39'	5,289
21 March 2000	Sheffield United	H	2 – 0	Johnston 32', O'Kane 45'	11,891
25 March 2000	Port Vale	H	2 – 1	Guðjohnsen 16', Johnston 42'	12,292
5 April 2000	Manchester City	A	0 – 2		32,927
8 April 2000	Walsall	H	4 – 3	Johansen 2' (pen), Hansen (2) 13', 74, Phillips 25'	11,777
15 April 2000	West Bromwich Albion	A	4 – 4	Hansen 36', Bergsson (2) 55, 90, Guðjohnsen 66'	12,802
22 April 2000	Huddersfield Town	A	3 – 0	Hansen (2) 9', 26', Whitlow 58'	16,404
26 April 2000	Crewe Alexandra	A	3 – 1	Guðjohnsen 15', Holdsworth 71' (pen), Jensen 89'	8,015
3 May 2000	Wolverhampton Wanderers	H	2 – 1	Jensen 60', Guðjohnsen 70'	18,871
7 May 2000	Norwich City	H	1 – 0	Holdsworth 72'	17,987

Pos	Team	Pld	W	D	L	GF	GA	GD	Pts	Qualification or relegation
4	Barnsley	46	24	10	12	88	67	+21	82	Qualification for the First Division play-offs
5	Birmingham City	46	22	11	13	65	44	+21	77	Qualification for the First Division play-offs
6	Bolton Wanderers	46	21	13	12	69	50	+19	76	Qualification for the First Division play-offs
7	Wolverhampton Wanderers	46	21	11	14	64	48	+16	74	
8	Huddersfield Town	46	21	11	14	62	49	+13	74	

Rules for classification: 1) Points; 2) Goal difference; 3) Goals scored

=== Nationwide League Division One play-offs ===
Date	Round	Opponents	H / A	Result F – A	Scorers	Attendance
14 May 2000	Semi-Final First Leg	Ipswich Town	H	2 – 2	Holdsworth 5', Guðjohnsen 26'	18,814
17 May 2000	Semi Final Second Leg	Ipswich Town	A	3 – 5 (aet); 5 – 7 (agg)	Holdsworth (2) 6', 39', Johnston 50'	21,543

=== F.A. Cup ===
Date	Round	Opponents	H / A	Result F – A	Scorers	Attendance
21 December 1999	Round 3	Cardiff City	H	1 – 0	Guðjohnsen 29'	5,734
8 January 2000	Round 4	Grimsby Town	A	2 – 0	Guðjohnsen 33', Hansen 54'	4,270
29 January 2000	Round 5	Cambridge United	A	3 – 1	Bob Taylor (2) 53, 75, Guðjohnsen 86'	7,523
19 February 2000	Round 6	Charlton Athletic	H	1 – 0	Guðjohnsen 47'	20,131
2 April 2000	Semi Final	Aston Villa	Wembley Stadium	0 – 0 (aet); Aston Villa won 4 – 1 on penalties		62,828

=== Worthington Cup ===
Date	Round	Opponents	H / A	Result F – A	Scorers	Attendance
10 August 1999	Round 1 First Leg	Darlington	A	1 – 1	Frandsen	5,361
24 August 1999	Round 1 Second Leg	Darlington	H	5 – 3; 6 – 4 (agg)	Reed 5' (og), Gardner 6', Taylor 50', Frandsen 55', Johansen 71' (pen)	4,991
14 September 1999	Round 2 First Leg	Gillingham	A	4 – 1	Cox 17', Guðjohnsen (2) 44', 58', Bergsson 64'	4,996
21 September 1999	Round 2 Second Leg	Gillingham	H	2 – 0; 6 – 1 (agg)	Hansen 4', Holdsworth 7'	3,673
13 October 1999	Round 3	Derby County	A	2 – 1	Fish 45', Johansen 88'	20,242
30 November 1999	Round 4	Sheffield Wednesday	H	1 – 0	Eliott 53'	12,543
14 December 1999	Round 5	Wimbledon	H	2 – 1	Guðjohnsen 34', Johansen 39' (pen)	9,463
12 January 2000	Semi Final First Leg	Tranmere Rovers	H	0 – 1		13,303
26 January 2000	Semi Final Second Leg	Tranmere Rovers	A	0 – 3; 0 – 4 (agg)		15,834

== Appearances ==
Bolton used a total of 30 players during the season.

P	Player	Position	FL	FAC	LC	Total
1	(Denmark) Michael Johansen	Midfielder	47 (1)	8 (1)	5 (0)	60 (1)
2	(Denmark) Claus Jensen	Midfielder	44 (1)	5 (0)	6 (0)	55 (1)
3	(Iceland) Eiður Guðjohnsen	Striker	41 (1)	4 (1)	8 (0)	53 (2)
4	(Iceland) Guðni Bergsson	Defender	40 (1)	4 (0)	7 (0)	51 (1)
5	(England) Mike Whitlow	Defender	38 (2)	5 (0)	7 (0)	50 (2)
6	(South Africa) Mark Fish	Defender	34 (0)	4 (0)	5 (0)	43 (0)
7	(Finland) Jussi Jääskeläinen	Goalkeeper	36 (1)	3 (0)	2 (0)	41 (1)
8	(Jamaica) Ricardo Gardner	Midfielder	27 (3)	2 (2)	9 (0)	38 (5)
9	(England) Dean Holdsworth	Striker	24 (13)	2 (0)	3 (2)	29 (15)
10	(England) Robbie Elliott	Defender	23 (6)	3 (0)	3 (1)	29 (7)
11	(Denmark) Bo Hansen	Midfielder/Striker	16 (15)	1 (0)	4 (1)	21 (16)
12	(England) Bob Taylor	Striker	15 (12)	3 (1)	3 (2)	21 (15)
13	(Scotland) Allan Johnston	Midfielder	19 (2)	2 (0)	0 (0)	21 (2)
14	(England) Jimmy Phillips	Defender	16 (9)	0 (0)	3 (1)	19 (10)
15	(England) Paul Warhurst	Defender/Midfielder	17 (4)	1 (1)	1 (3)	19 (8)
16	(Scotland) Paul Ritchie	Midfielder	15 (1)	3 (1)	1 (0)	19 (2)
17	(England) Neil Cox	Defender	15 (0)	0 (0)	4 (0)	19 (0)
18	(England) Andy Todd	Defender	10 (2)	0 (0)	4 (0)	14 (2)
19	(Republic of Ireland) Keith Branagan	Goalkeeper	11 (0)	0 (0)	3 (0)	14 (0)
20	(France) Franck Passi	Midfielder	7 (9)	2 (1)	2 (0)	11 (10)
21	(England) Dean Holden	Defender	6 (6)	3 (1)	2 (1)	11 (8)
22	(England) John O'Kane	Defender	7 (4)	1 (1)	2 (0)	10 (5)
23	(Denmark) Per Frandsen	Midfielder	7 (0)	0 (0)	3 (0)	10 (0)
24	(England) Greg Strong	Defender	6 (0)	0 (0)	3 (1)	9 (1)
25	(Republic of Ireland) Gareth Farrelly	Midfielder	8 (3)	0 (1)	0 (0)	8 (4)
26	(England) Steve Banks	Goalkeeper	2 (0)	2 (0)	4 (0)	8 (0)
27	(England) Hasney Aljofree	Striker	3 (5)	0 (2)	3 (2)	6 (9)
28	(England) Darren Holloway	Defender	3 (1)	0 (0)	0 (0)	3 (1)
29	(England) Kevin Nolan	Midfielder	0 (4)	0 (0)	0 (0)	0 (4)
30	(France) Mickael Kaprielian	Midfielder	0 (1)	0 (0)	0 (0)	0 (1)

== Top scorers ==
P	Player	Position	FL	FAC	LC	Total
1	(Iceland) Eiður Guðjohnsen	Striker	14	4	3	21
2	(England) Dean Holdsworth	Striker	14	0	1	15
3	(Denmark) Bo Hansen	Midfielder	9	1	1	11
4=	(Jamaica) Ricardo Gardner	Midfielder	5	1	0	6
4=	(Denmark) Claus Jensen	Midfielder	6	0	0	6
4=	(Denmark) Michael Johansen	Midfielder	3	0	3	6
4=	(England) Bob Taylor	Striker	3	1	2	6
