= 1998–99 Bolton Wanderers F.C. season =

Bolton Wanderers
1998–99 season
- Chairman: Gordon Hargreaves
- Manager: Colin Todd
- Stadium: Reebok Stadium
- First Division: 6th
- FA Cup: 3rd Round
- Worthington Cup: 4th Round
- Top goalscorer: League: Bob Taylor (15); All: Bob Taylor (18)
- Highest home attendance: 24,625 v Bradford City; 26 December 1998
- Lowest home attendance: 6,429 v Hartlepool United; 11 August 1998

The 1998–1999 season was the 120th season in Bolton Wanderers F.C.'s existence, and their first season back in the Football League First Division after relegation from the Premier League. It covers the period from 1 July 1998 to 30 June 1999.

== Results ==
=== Nationwide League Division One ===
Date	Opponents	H / A	Result F – A	Scorers	Attendance
8 August 1998	Crystal Palace	A	2 – 2	Holdsworth 33', Gunnlaugsson 90'	19,029
15 August 1998	Grimsby Town	H	2 – 0	Blake 56', Holdsworth 70' (pen)	16,584
23 August 1998	Bradford City	A	2 – 2	Gunnlaugsson 19', Blake 60'	13,163
29 August 1998	Sheffield United	H	2 – 2	Strong 5', Blake 36'	18,263
8 September 1998	West Bromwich Albion	A	3 – 2	Gunnlaugsson 19', Blake 26', Gardner 88'	15,789
12 September 1998	Birmingham City	H	3 – 1	Taylor (2) 1', 49', Frandsen 5'	19,637
19 September 1998	Crewe Alexandra	A	4 – 4	Gunnlaugsson 23', 44', Taylor 37', Frandsen 50'	5,744
26 September 1998	Huddersfield Town	H	3 – 0	Frandsen 15', Blake 26', Gunnlaugsson 43'	20,971
29 September 1996	Swindon Town	H	2 – 1	Blake 46', Gunnlaugsson 86'	16,497
3 October 1998	Barnsley	A	2 – 2	Gunnlaugsson 21', Johansen 42'	17,362
17 October 1998	Oxford United	H	1 – 1	Frandsen 37'	17,064
20 October 1998	Watford	H	1 – 2	Gunnlaugsson 25'	15,921
23 October 1998	Bristol City	A	1 – 2	Gunnlaugsson 5'	12,026
1 November 1998	Sunderland	H	0 – 3		21,676
4 November 1998	Port Vale	H	3 – 1	Taylor 5', Frandsen 20', Gunnlaugsson 69'	13,324
7 November 1998	Queens Park Rangers	A	0 – 2		11,814
14 November 1998	Tranmere Rovers	H	2 – 2	Johansen 53', Holdsworth 56' (pen)	16,564
21 November 1998	Ipswich Town	A	1 – 0	Taylor 90'	17,225
24 November 1998	Stockport County	A	1 – 0	Taylor 81'	8,520
28 November 1998	Bury	H	4 – 0	Johansen (2) 21', 57', Gunnlaugsson (2) 64', 67'	21,028
5 December 1998	Wolverhampton Wanderers	A	1 – 1	Taylor 58'	22,537
12 December 1998	Tranmere Rovers	A	1 – 1	Taylor 11'	6,959
19 December 1998	Portsmouth	H	3 – 1	Taylor 70', Frandsen 78', Holdsworth 84'	15,981
26 December 1998	Bradford City	H	0 – 0		24,625
28 December 1996	Port Vale	A	2 – 0	Sellars 48', Holdsworth 75' (pen)	8,201
10 January 1999	Crystal Palace	H	3 – 0	Taylor 3', Johansen 26', Jensen 33'	15,410
16 January 1999	Sheffield United	A	2 – 1	Holdsworth (2) 45', 72'	15,787
30 January 1999	Norwich City	H	2 – 0	Holdsworth 38', Cox 65'	17,269
6 February 1999	Grimsby Town	A	1 – 0	Holdsworth 54'	8,674
13 February 1999	West Bromwich Albion	H	2 – 1	Taylor 43', Cox 51'	20,657
21 February 1999	Birmingham City	A	0 – 0		26,051
27 February 1999	Crewe Alexandra	H	1 – 3	Holdsworth 55' (pen)	19,437
2 March 1999	Huddersfield Town	A	2 – 3	Holdsworth 19', Johansen 50'	13,867
6 March 1999	Swindon Town	A	3 – 3	Fish 60', Jensen 70, Guðjohnsen 77'	8,392
9 March 1999	Barnsley	H	3 – 3	Sellars 15', Holdsworth 25' (pen), Guðjohnsen 80'	16,537
13 March 1999	Queens Park Rangers	H	2 – 1	Taylor (2) 30', 58'	17,919
20 March 1999	Sunderland	A	1 – 3	Frandsen 49'	41,505
3 April 1999	Oxford United	A	0 – 0		7,547
5 April 1999	Stockport County	H	1 – 2	Taylor 49'	18,587
10 April 1999	Watford	A	0 – 2		13,001
13 April 1999	Bristol City	H	1 – 0	Guðjohnsen 7'	14,4559
17 April 1999	Ipswich Town	H	2 – 0	Taylor 37', Guðjohnsen 69'	19,894
20 April 1999	Norwich City	A	2 – 2	Cox 48', Frandsen 74'	11,137
23 April 1999	Bury	A	2 – 1	Cox 90'	7,680
30 April 1999	Wolverhampton Wanderers	H	1 – 1	Gardner 36'	20,280
9 May 1999	Portsmouth	A	2 – 0	Johansen 20', Guðjohnsen 67'	16,015

Pos	Team	Pld	W	D	L	GF	GA	GD	Pts	Qualification or relegation
4	Birmingham City	46	23	12	11	66	37	+29	81	Qualification for the First Division play-offs
5	Watford (O, P)	46	21	14	11	65	56	+9	77	Qualification for the First Division play-offs
6	Bolton Wanderers	46	20	16	10	78	59	+19	76	Qualification for the First Division play-offs
7	Wolverhampton Wanderers	46	19	16	11	64	43	+21	73	
8	Sheffield United	46	18	13	15	71	66	+5	67	

Rules for classification: 1) Points; 2) Goals scored; 3) Goal difference
(O) Play-off winners; (P) Promoted

=== Nationwide League Division One play-offs ===
Date	Round	Opponents	H / A	Result F – A	Scorers	Attendance
16 May 1999	Semi-Final First Leg	Ipswich Town	H	1 – 0	Johansen 84'	18,295
19 May 1999	Semi Final Second Leg	Ipswich Town	A	3 – 4 (aet); Bolton win on away goals	Taylor 51', 96' Frandsen 84'	21,755
31 May 1999	Final	Watford	Wembley Stadium	0 – 2		70,343

=== F.A. Cup ===
Date	Round	Opponents	H / A	Result F – A	Scorers	Attendance
2 January 1999	Round 3	Wolverhampton Wanderers	H	1 – 2	Sellars 57'	18,269

=== Worthington Cup ===
Date	Round	Opponents	H / A	Result F – A	Scorers	Attendance
11 August 1998	Round 1 First Leg	Hartlepool	H	1 – 0	Taylor	6,429
25 August 1998	Round 1 Second Leg	Hartlepool	A	3 – 0; 4 – 0 (agg)	Blake (3) 55', 59', 71'	3,185
15 September 1998	Round 2 First Leg	Hull City	H	3 – 1	Phillips 45', Gunnlaugsson 61', Frandsen 89'	7,544
22 September 1998	Round 2 Second Leg	Hull City	A	3 – 2; 6 – 3 (agg)	Jensen 26', Johansen 72', Gardner 79'	4,226
27 October 1998	Round 3	Norwich City	A	1 – 1 (aet); Bolton win 3 – 1 on penalties	Elliott 96'	14,189
10 November 1998	Round 4	Wimbledon	H	1 – 2	Jensen 52'	7,868

== Appearances ==
Bolton used a total of 27 players during the season.

P	Player	Position	FL	FAC	LC	Total
1	(Denmark) Claus Jensen	Midfielder	47 (0)	1 (0)	6 (0)	54 (0)
2	(Denmark) Per Frandsen	Midfielder	47 (0)	1 (0)	4 (0)	52 (0)
3	(England) Neil Cox	Defender	45 (2)	1 (0)	5 (0)	51 (2)
4	(Denmark) Michael Johansen	Midfielder	43 (3)	1 (0)	4 (1)	48 (4)
5	(South Africa) Mark Fish	Defender	39 (0)	1 (0)	5 (0)	45 (0)
6	(Finland) Jussi Jääskeläinen	Goalkeeper	34 (0)	1 (0)	5 (0)	40 (0)
7	(England) Bob Taylor	Striker	35 (6)	1 (0)	3 (3)	39 (9)
8	(England) Mike Whitlow	Defender	27 (1)	1 (0)	3 (1)	31 (2)
9	(Iceland) Arnar Gunnlaugsson	Striker	22 (5)	0 (1)	6 (0)	28 (6)
10	(England) Dean Holdsworth	Striker	22 (10)	1 (0)	3 (1)	26 (11)
11	(England) Scott Sellars	Midfielder	22 (4)	1 (0)	2 (0)	25(4)
12	(Jamaica) Ricardo Gardner	Midfielder	22 (6)	0 (1)	2 (1)	24 (8)
13	(England) Andy Todd	Defender	21 (2)	0 (0)	3 (0)	24 (2)
14	(Iceland) Guðni Bergsson	Defender	15 (3)	1 (0)	3 (0)	19 (3)
15	(England) Robbie Elliott	Defender	17 (8)	0 (0)	1 (0)	18 (8)
16	(England) Paul Warhurst	Defender/Midfielder	17 (5)	0 (0)	0 (0)	17 (5)
17	(England) Jimmy Phillips	Defender	14 (1)	0 (0)	3 (1)	17 (2)
18	(Wales) Nathan Blake	Striker	11 (1)	0 (0)	2 (1)	13 (2)
19	(England) Steve Banks	Goalkeeper	9 (0)	0 (0)	3 (0)	12 (0)
20	(Iceland) Eiður Guðjohnsen	Striker	11 (6)	0 (0)	0 (1)	11 (7)
21	(England) Greg Strong	Defender	4 (1)	0 (0)	4 (0)	8 (1)
22	(England) Jon Newsome	Defender	6 (0)	0 (0)	0 (0)	6 (0)
23	(Republic of Ireland) Keith Branagan	Goalkeeper	3 (0)	0 (0)	1 (0)	4 (0)
24	(England) Hasney Aljofree	Defender	1 (3)	0 (0)	1 (0)	2 (3)
25	(Denmark) Bo Hansen	Midfielder/Striker	1 (10)	0 (0)	0 (0)	1 (10)
26	(England) Jamie Fullarton	Midfielder	1 (0)	0 (0)	0 (0)	1 (0)
27	(England) Scott Taylor	Striker	0 (0)	0 (0)	0 (1)	0 (1)

== Top scorers ==
P	Player	Position	1st Div	FAC	LC	Total
1	(England) Bob Taylor	Striker	17	0	1	18
2	(Iceland) Arnar Gunnlaugsson	Striker	13	1	0	14
3	(England) Dean Holdsworth	Striker	12	0	0	12
4	(Denmark) Per Frandsen	Midfielder	9	0	1	10
5	(Wales) Nathan Blake	Striker	6	0	3	9
