= 2001 Football League First Division play-off final =

Association football match in Cardiff, UK

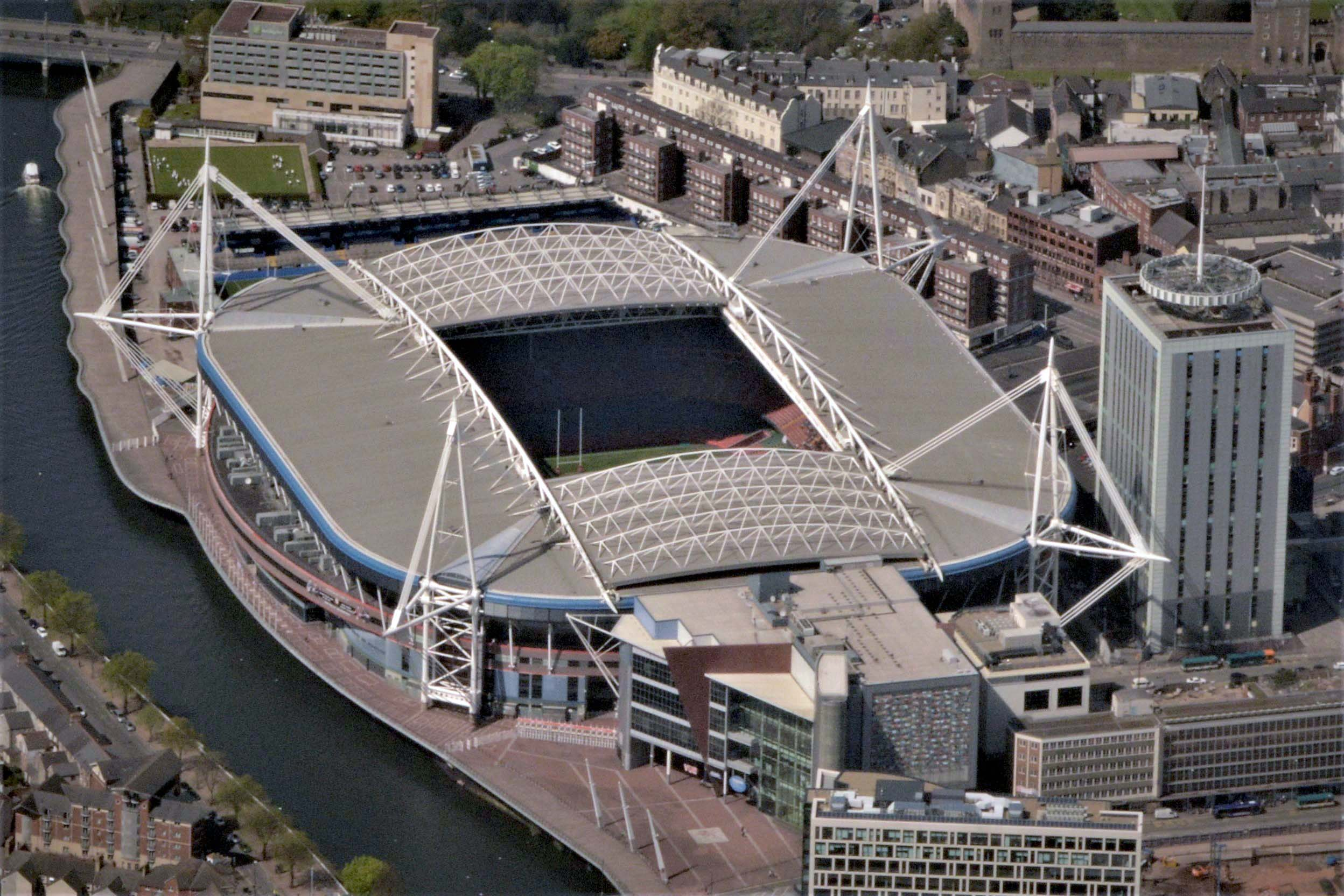
- The match was played at the Millennium Stadium in Cardiff.
Bolton Wanderers	Preston North End
3	0
- Date: 28 May 2001
- Venue: Millennium Stadium, Cardiff
- Referee: Uriah Rennie (Sheffield)
- Attendance: 54,328

The 2001 Football League First Division play-off final was an association football match which was played on 28 May 2001 at the Millennium Stadium, Cardiff, between Bolton Wanderers and Preston North End. The match was to determine the third and final team to gain promotion from the Football League First Division, the second tier of English football, to the Premier League. The top two teams of the 2000–01 Football League First Division season gained automatic promotion to the Premier League, while the clubs placed from third to sixth position in the table took part in play-off semi-finals; Bolton Wanderers ended the season in third position while Preston North End finished fourth. The winners of these semi-finals competed for the final place for the 2001–02 season in the Premier League. Birmingham City and West Bromwich Albion were the losing semi-finalists. Winning the final was estimated by the UK media to be worth up to £30 million to the successful team.

Played in front of a crowd of 54,328, the 2001 final was refereed by Uriah Rennie. Bolton took an early lead through Gareth Farrelly with a shot from outside the Preston penalty area. Second-half substitute Michael Ricketts doubled their lead late in the second half before Ricardo Gardner scored a third when he ran from inside his own half and shot past David Lucas in the Preston goal. The match ended 3–0 and saw Bolton promoted to the Premier League after a three-year absence.

Despite being favourites for relegation in their following season, Bolton finished sixteenth in the Premier League, two places above the relegation zone. Preston ended their next campaign in eighth place in the First Division, two places below the 2002 Football League play-offs.

== Route to the final ==
Football League First Division final table, leading positions
Pos	Team	Pld	W	D	L	GF	GA	GD	Pts
1	Fulham	46	30	11	5	90	32	+58	101
2	Blackburn Rovers	46	26	13	7	76	39	+37	91
3	Bolton Wanderers	46	24	15	7	76	45	+31	87
4	Preston North End	46	23	9	14	64	52	+12	78
5	Birmingham City	46	23	9	14	59	48	+11	78
6	West Bromwich Albion	46	21	11	14	60	52	+8	74

Bolton Wanderers finished the regular 2000–01 season in third place in the Football League First Division, the second tier of the English football league system, one place and nine points ahead of Preston North End. Both therefore missed out on the two automatic places for promotion to the Premier League and instead took part in the play-offs, along with Birmingham City and West Bromwich Albion, to determine the third promoted team. Bolton finished four points behind Blackburn Rovers (who were promoted in second place) and fourteen behind league winners Fulham.

Preston faced Birmingham City in their play-off semi-final, with the first match of the two-legged tie taking part at St Andrew's in Birmingham on 13 May 2001. After a goalless first half in which Birmingham's Marcelo hit the Preston crossbar, Nicky Eaden put the home side ahead in the 54th minute. David Healy's strike 20 minutes later was saved by Ian Bennett in Birmingham's goal, while Darren Purse's late header went wide from 6 yards (5.5 m) ensuring the game ended 1–0 to Birmingham. The second leg of the semi-final was played four days later at Preston's Deepdale. Midway through the first half, Healy's strike high into the Birmingham net levelled the aggregate score. Five minutes into the second half, Danny Sonner's header struck the home side's crossbar and in the 59th minute, Geoff Horsfield gave Birmingham the lead overall when he converted a cross from Stan Lazaridis at the far post. Preston were awarded a penalty in the 78th minute after a Sonner handball, but Graham Alexander's spot-kick hit the bar. A late shot from Lazaridis rolled along Preston's goal line before Birmingham conceded an injury-time goal from Mark Rankine to make it 2–2 on aggregate and send the match into extra time. No goals were scored during the additional period, so a penalty shootout decided the match: Marcelo and Purse both missed their spot-kicks for Birmingham and although Preston's Rob Edwards saw his effort also go awry, Paul McKenna's converted shot ensured Preston won the shootout 4–2 to progress to the final.

Bolton's opponents were West Bromwich Albion and the first leg of their play-off semi-final was hosted at The Hawthorns in West Bromwich on 13 May 2001. West Bromwich Albion dominated most of the match but it was not until a minute before half time that they took the lead with a goal from Jason Roberts who ran onto a Richard Sneekes pass and struck the ball past Matt Clarke in the Bolton goal. Ten minutes into the second half, Colin Hendry brought Roberts down and conceded a penalty which was converted by Lee Hughes to make it 2–0 to West Bromwich Albion. With less than ten minutes remaining, Guðni Bergsson scored with a header from Bo Hansen's corner to reduce the deficit. In the 88th minute, West Bromwich Albion's Tony Butler fouled Hansen to concede a penalty which was converted by Per Frandsen, and the match ended 2–2. The return leg of the semi-final was played four days later at the Reebok Stadium in Bolton. Bergsson opened the scoring for the home side after ten minutes, converting a free kick from Simon Charlton. In the 63rd minute, Ricardo Gardner doubled Bolton's lead on the day with a goal after running on to a pass from Anthony Barness. A last-minute goal from Michael Ricketts secured Bolton a 3–0 victory, and a 5–2 aggregate win and progression to the final.

== Match ==
=== Background ===
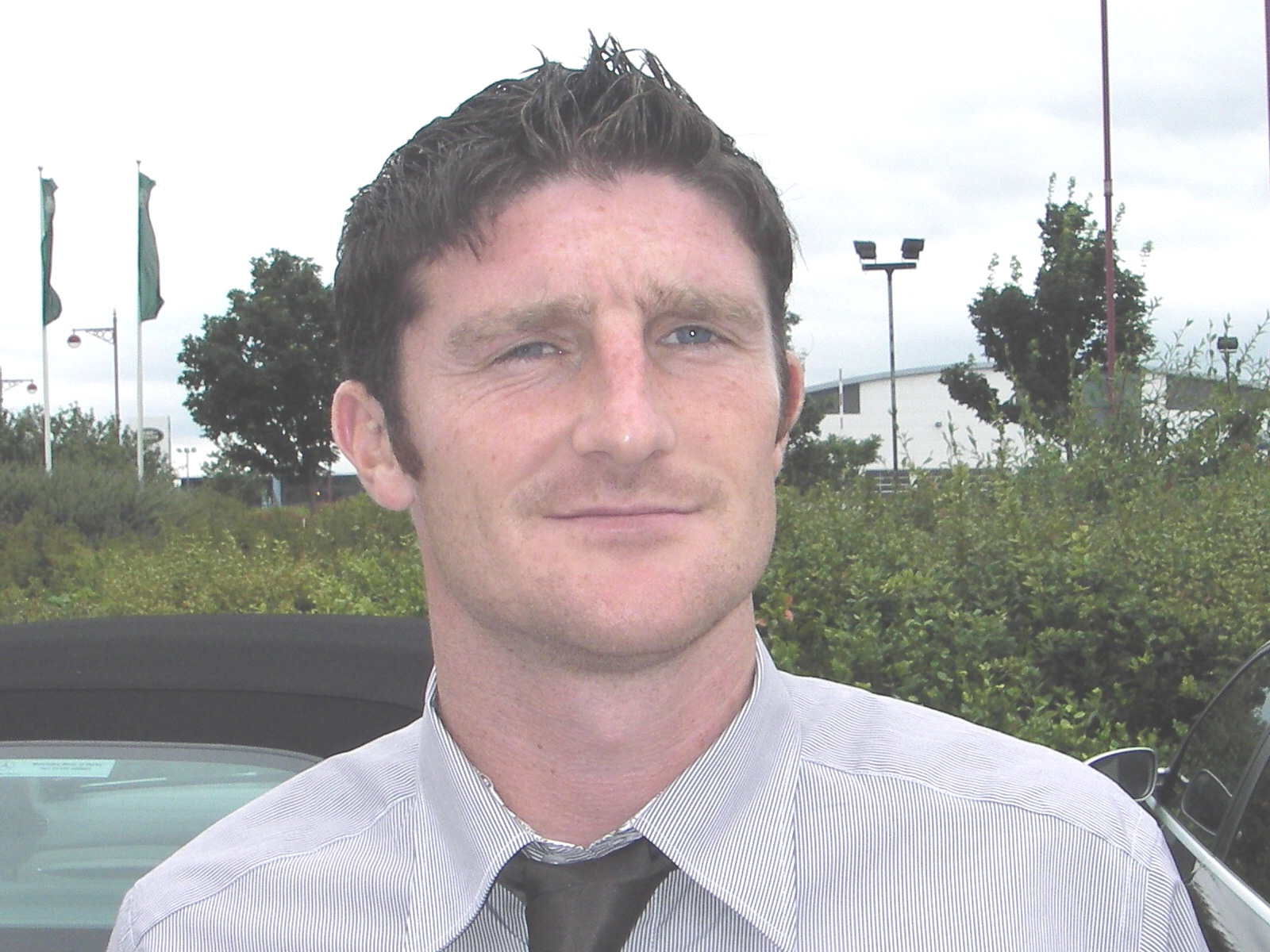
Jon Macken (pictured in 2007) was Preston North End's top league goalscorer.

The 2001 Football League First Division play-off final was Bolton's third appearance in the second tier play-off final: they had lost 2–0 in the 1999 final at Wembley Stadium against Watford and had defeated Reading 4–3 after extra time in the 1995 final. They had also lost to Ipswich Town 7–5 on aggregate in the previous season's play-offs. Preston were making their first appearance in the second tier play-off final, although they had lost 4–2 at Wembley against Wycombe Wanderers in the 1994 Third Division play-off final. Jon Macken was Preston's top scorer in the league throughout the regular season with 19 goals, while Ricketts was Bolton's leading marksman, also with 19. Bolton had last played in the top tier in the 1997–98 season when they were relegated on goal difference. Preston had not featured in the highest division in English football since their relegation in the 1960–61 season. This was the culmination of their first season back in the First Division, having been promoted from the Second Division the previous season. In the regular season, Bolton won both matches between the teams, with a 2–0 victory at home in August 2000 and a win by the same scoreline on New Year's Day in 2001.

The referee for the match was Uriah Rennie representing the Sheffield & Hallamshire County Football Association. Prior to the final, former Preston player Mark Lawrenson noted: "If we go up it will be a great boost. And even if we go straight down again, we'll still get half the Premiership TV money for two years afterwards". Eamonn McCann, writing in the Sunday Tribune, called the fixture "a victory for tradition", suggesting it would be a "rare and relaxed experience for faithful lovers of football". The Bolton manager Sam Allardyce suggested his team's experience would stand them in good stead for the final: "I hope we can draw on our experience ... If we can do that then we have a fantastic chance of getting the victory we want". His side's supporters were allocated the Canton End of the Millennium Stadium which had hosted fans of every winning side during the period when the play-off finals were played there as a substitute location for Wembley Stadium between 2001 and 2006. Bolton's Paul Warhurst had recovered from a hamstring injury and was available for selection. Preston's manager David Moyes was expecting the return of three injured players in Rankine, Michael Jackson and Richard Cresswell. According to the UK media, victory in the final was expected to be worth around £30 million to the winning team. The presidents of both clubs, Tom Finney and Nat Lofthouse, were in attendance to watch the match.

=== Summary ===
Bolton kicked off the match at 3 p.m. on 28 May 2001 in front of a Millennium Stadium crowd of 54,328. On five minutes, the first chance fell to Preston's Macken whose header from a Healy cross was straight at Clarke in the Bolton goal. Four minutes later, a Lee Cartwright cross found Healy at the near post but the opportunity was blocked by Hendry. Preston then had two successive corners, both cleared, before Bolton took the lead in the 16th minute. A long free kick was poorly cleared and allowed Gareth Farrelly to shoot from just outside the Preston penalty area, past David Lucas, to make it 1–0. Lucas then saved a Dean Holdsworth chance before a Bergsson header at the far post went over the goal. Bolton's domination of the game continued, and in the 32nd minute, Gardner's shot across goal was saved by Lucas. Eight minutes later, a low cross from Farrelly into the box was cleared by Preston's defence. With two minutes of the first half remaining, a mistake from Alexander allowed Hansen to take a snap shot which passed just over the Preston crossbar.

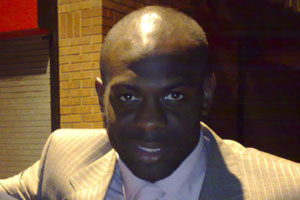
Michael Ricketts (pictured in 2007) scored Bolton's second goal in the play-off final.

Neither side made any changes during the half-time interval and Preston kicked off the second half. Two minutes in, Holdsworth made a run down the right and passed to Barness whose shot was too high. A minute later, a weak effort from Rankine was easily saved by Clarke. Preston began to exert pressure on Bolton with Healy in particular causing problems. In the 62nd minute, Farrelly passed to Holdsworth whose shot into the bottom left-hand corner was saved by Lucas. Three minutes later, an effort from Rankine went wide of the Bolton goal. Preston then made the first substitution of the game, with Iain Anderson coming on to replace Cartwright. In the 68th minute, Healy was denied by Clarke in the Bolton goal with a save low to his left. Bolton made their first change in the 70th minute, Hansen being substituted for Ricketts, with Allardyce changing his team's formation to a more defensive 4–4–2 from 4–3–3. Nine minutes later, Robbie Elliott came on in place of Frandsen for Bolton and in the 82nd minute, Preston made their second substitution, with Cresswell replacing McKenna. Two minutes later Clarke punched away a Healy cross to concede a corner from which Cresswell failed to capitalise from close range on a missed clearance. On 86 minutes, Ricketts hit the side netting with a shot and Preston responded with Sean Gregan striking over the Bolton bar. In the 89th minute, Ricketts doubled Bolton's lead, taking the ball from Farrelly, rounding the goalkeeper and passing into an empty net. In the first minute of injury time, Mike Whitlow came on for Bolton to replace Holdsworth, before Gardner increased their lead. He dispossessed Alexander in the Bolton half, went past a tiring Colin Murdock, and scored, making it 3–0 and securing Bolton's promotion to the Premier League.

=== Details ===
28 May 2001
15:00 BST

Bolton Wanderers	3–0	Preston North End
Farrelly 17'; Ricketts 89'; Gardner 90'

Millennium Stadium, Cardiff
Attendance: 54,328
Referee: Uriah Rennie (Sheffield)

Bolton Wanderers	Preston North End

Bolton Wanderers:
GK	21	(England) Matt Clarke
RB	24	(England) Anthony Barness
CB	4	(Iceland) Guðni Bergsson
CB	30	(Scotland) Colin Hendry
LB	25	(England) Simon Charlton
RM	15	(England) Kevin Nolan
CM	8	(Denmark) Per Frandsen	(substituted off) 79'
CM	14	(Republic of Ireland) Gareth Farrelly
LM	11	(Jamaica) Ricardo Gardner
CF	10	(England) Dean Holdsworth	(substituted off) 89'
CF	9	(Denmark) Bo Hansen	(substituted off) 70'
Substitutes:
MF	7	(England) Robbie Elliott	(substituted on) 79'
DF	3	(England) Mike Whitlow	(substituted on) 89'
FW	17	(England) Michael Ricketts	(substituted on) 70'
GK	1	(England) Steve Banks
DF	28	(England) Ian Marshall
Manager:
(England) Sam Allardyce

Preston North End:
GK	1	(England) David Lucas
RB	2	(Scotland) Graham Alexander
CB	14	(Northern Ireland) Colin Murdock
CB	4	(England) Ryan Kidd
LB	15	(Wales) Rob Edwards
RM	7	(England) Lee Cartwright
CM	8	(England) Mark Rankine
CM	6	(England) Sean Gregan
LM	16	(England) Paul McKenna	(substituted off) 82'
CF	11	(Northern Ireland) David Healy
CF	17	(England) Jon Macken	(substituted off) 66'
Substitutes:
FW	25	(England) Richard Cresswell	(substituted on) 82'
MF	31	(Scotland) Iain Anderson	(substituted on) 66'
GK	21	(Finland) Tepi Moilanen
DF	5	(England) Michael Jackson
MF	28	(Republic of Ireland) Brian Barry-Murphy
Manager:
(Scotland) David Moyes

== Post-match ==
Allardyce, the winning manager, was elated: "I can't quite put what I feel into words ... I feel like the world has come off my shoulders. It is a phenomenal achievement." Reflecting on his side's defensive competence, he continued: "I think that's our 20th clean sheet of the season and that's the secret of our success – soaking up the pressure and hitting them on the break". Moyes agreed with his counterpart's pre-match assessment: "The difference was experience ... I hope we'll learn from it and come back again". He continued: "When you lose the last game of the season you think the season has been a failure – but it's been a wonderful season". He conceded that Bolton had deserved the victory, noting "I was happy to go in at the interval only one down ... I don't think it was stage fright, we just kept giving the ball away." The Guardian reported that Holdsworth was the man of the match. Farrelly, whose goal for Everton condemned Bolton to relegation three years prior, was relieved: "I was so delighted to see that goal go in. I got the goal that sent them down three years ago, and it is fair to say it has been mentioned since I signed". Lofthouse, described by the BBC as a "Bolton legend" said: "They played great, those lads, they were first class, every one of them ... It's the proudest moment – though there's one moment that beats it and that's when we won the FA Cup in '58." Bookmakers immediately made Bolton favourites to be relegated from the Premier League the following season. Bolton's Bergsson had intended to retire at the end of the season to follow a legal career in Iceland, but after securing promotion his postponed this decision, and went on to make 30 Premier League appearances the next season.

In their following season, Bolton finished sixteenth in the Premier League, two places and four points above the relegation zone. Moyes left Preston in March 2002 to join Premier League club Everton and was replaced on an interim basis by Kelham O'Hanlon before Craig Brown was appointed the following month. Preston ended their next campaign in eighth place in the First Division, two places and three points below the play-offs.
