= 2002–03 Bolton Wanderers F.C. season =

Bolton Wanderers
2002–03 season
- Chairman: Phil Gartside
- Manager: Sam Allardyce
- Stadium: Reebok Stadium
- Premier League: 17th
- FA Cup: Third round
- League Cup: Second round
- Top goalscorer: Youri Djorkaeff; Jay-Jay Okocha; Henrik Pedersen (7)
- Highest home attendance: 27,409 (vs. Manchester United, 22 February)
- Lowest home attendance: 10,123 (vs. Sunderland, 4 January)
Home colours	Away colours

The 2002–03 season was the 124th season in Bolton Wanderers F.C.'s existence, and was their second consecutive season in the top-flight. This article covers the period from 1 July 2002 to 30 June 2003.

== Season summary ==
A home victory over Aston Villa and a memorable 1–0 victory over Manchester United at Old Trafford got Bolton off to another promising start to the season, but their subsequent form was memorable for all the wrong reasons as they only won 2 of their next 21 games, causing most pundits to write them off by the start of 2003. A 4–2 win over Birmingham City on 1 February finally kickstarted their campaign and the club only lost two more games (away to Chelsea and Liverpool) during the rest of the season, leaving them in control of their destiny on the final day. They achieved survival with a 2–1 victory over Middlesbrough.

== First-team squad ==
Note: Flags indicate national team as defined under FIFA eligibility rules; some limited exceptions apply. Players may hold more than one non-FIFA nationality.

No.	Pos.	Nation	Player
2	DF	FRA	Bernard Mendy (on loan from PSG)
3	DF	ENG	Mike Whitlow
4	DF	ISL	Guðni Bergsson
5	DF	FRA	Bruno Ngotty
6	DF	ENG	Paul Warhurst
8	MF	DEN	Per Frandsen
9	FW	DEN	Henrik Pedersen
10	FW	NGA	Jay-Jay Okocha
11	MF	JAM	Ricardo Gardner
12	FW	IRL	Jonathan Walters
13	FW	FRA	Youri Djorkaeff
14	MF	IRL	Gareth Farrelly
15	MF	ENG	Kevin Nolan
16	DF	ESP	Iván Campo (on loan from Real Madrid)
17	DF	FRA	Florent Laville (on loan from Lyon)

No.	Pos.	Nation	Player
18	FW	FRA	Pierre-Yves André (on loan from Nantes)
19	FW	ENG	Delroy Facey
20	FW	ESP	Salva Ballesta (on loan from Valencia)
21	FW	ENG	Chris Armstrong
22	GK	FIN	Jussi Jääskeläinen
23	DF	ENG	Danny Livesey
24	DF	ENG	Anthony Barness
25	DF	ENG	Simon Charlton
28	MF	JAM	Jermaine Johnson
29	MF	DEN	Stig Tøfting
30	GK	ENG	Kevin Poole
33	DF	SCO	Colin Hendry
34	MF	ENG	Jeff Smith
36	DF	ENG	Nicky Hunt

=== Left club during season ===
Note: Flags indicate national team as defined under FIFA eligibility rules; some limited exceptions apply. Players may hold more than one non-FIFA nationality.

No.	Pos.	Nation	Player
1	GK	ENG	Steve Banks (to Stoke City)
7	MF	TUR	Bülent Akın (released)
17	FW	ENG	Michael Ricketts (to Middlesbrough)
18	FW	ENG	Dean Holdsworth (to Coventry City)
20	MF	ENG	Nicky Southall (to Gillingham)
21	FW	DEN	Bo Hansen (to Midtjylland)

No.	Pos.	Nation	Player
26	MF	ENG	David Norris (to Plymouth Argyle)
38	MF	NIR	Wayne Buchanan (released)
39	MF	IRL	Ciaran Ryan (released)
36	DF	ENG	David Holdsworth (to Scarborough)
41	DF	IRL	Alan O'Hare (to Chesterfield)

== Reserve squad ==
Note: Flags indicate national team as defined under FIFA eligibility rules; some limited exceptions apply. Players may hold more than one non-FIFA nationality.

No.	Pos.	Nation	Player
27	MF	TAH	Gerald Forschelet
35	DF	ENG	Leam Richardson
37	MF	JAM	Cleveland Taylor

No.	Pos.	Nation	Player
40	MF	ENG	Chris Downey
42	MF	SCO	Derek Niven
50	GK	FRA	Jeremy Bon

== Results ==
=== FA Premier League ===
==== Results per matchday ====
Matchday	1	2	3	4	5	6	7	8	9	10	11	12	13	14	15	16	17	18	19	20	21	22	23	24	25	26	27	28	29	30	31	32	33	34	35	36	37	38
Ground	A	H	H	A	H	A	H	A	A	H	A	H	A	H	A	H	H	A	H	A	A	H	A	A	H	H	A	H	A	A	H	H	A	H	A	H	A	H
Result	L	L	W	W	L	L	D	L	L	D	L	D	W	D	L	D	L	D	W	D	L	D	D	L	L	W	D	D	L	W	W	W	L	W	D	D	D	W
Position	19	20	17	12	13	17	17	18	20	20	20	20	18	18	19	18	19	19	17	17	17	17	17	17	17	17	17	16	17	17	17	16	17	17	16	17	17	17

Updated to match(es) played on 11 May 2003. Source: Statto.com
A = Away; H = Home; W = Win; D = Draw; L = Loss

Date	Opponents	H / A	Result F – A	Scorers	Attendance
17 August 2002	Fulham	A	1 – 4	Ricketts 4' (pen)	16,338
24 August 2002	Charlton Athletic	H	1 – 2	Djorkaeff 2'	21,753
1 September 2002	Aston Villa	H	1 – 0	Ricketts 56' (pen)	22,500
11 September 2002	Manchester United	A	1 – 0	Nolan 76'	67,623
14 September 2002	Liverpool	H	2 – 3	Gardner 54', Campo 87'	27,328
21 September 2002	Arsenal	A	1 – 2	Farrelly 47'	37,974
28 September 2002	Southampton	H	1 – 1	Djorkaeff 90'	22,692
5 October 2002	Middlesbrough	A	0 – 2		31,005
20 October 2002	Tottenham Hotspur	A	1 – 3	Djorkaeff 63'	35,909
28 October 2002	Sunderland	H	1 – 1	Babb 80' (og)	23,036
2 November 2002	Birmingham City	A	1 – 3	Okocha 72'	27,224
9 November 2002	West Bromwich Albion	H	1 – 1	Frandsen 89'	23,630
17 November 2002	Leeds United	A	4 – 2	Pedersen (2) 3', 90', Djorkaeff 80' Ricketts 89' (pen)	36,627
23 November 2002	Chelsea	H	1 – 1	Pedersen 63'	25,476
30 November 2002	Manchester City	A	0 – 2		34,860
7 December 2002	Blackburn Rovers	H	1 – 1	Okocha 8'	24,556
16 December 2002	Leeds United	H	0 – 3		23,378
21 December 2002	West Ham United	A	1 – 1	Ricketts 65'	34,892
26 December 2002	Newcastle United	H	4 – 3	Okocha 5', Gardner 9', Ricketts (2) 45', 63'	27,314
28 December 2002	Everton	A	0 – 0		39,480
1 January 2003	Aston Villa	A	0 – 2		31,838
11 January 2003	Fulham	H	0 – 0		25,156
18 January 2003	Charlton Athletic	A	1 – 1	Djorkaeff 85'	26,057
22 January 2003	Newcastle United	A	0 – 1		52,005
28 January 2003	Everton	H	1 – 2	Bergsson 90'	25,119
1 February 2003	Birmingham City	H	4 – 2	Cunningham 12' (o.g.), Pedersen 46', Djorkaeff 84', Facey 87'	24,342
8 February 2003	West Bromwich Albion	A	1 – 1	Pedersen 18'	26,933
22 February 2003	Manchester United	H	1 – 1	Ngotty 90'	27,409
8 March 2003	Liverpool	A	0 – 2		41,462
15 March 2003	Sunderland	A	2 – 0	Okocha 50', Pedersen 55'	42,124
24 March 2003	Tottenham Hotspur	H	1 – 0	Okocha 90' (pen)	23,084
5 April 2003	Manchester City	H	2 – 0	Pedersen 32', Campo 52'	26,949
12 April 2003	Chelsea	A	0 – 1		39,852
19 April 2003	West Ham United	H	1 – 0	Okocha 38'	27,160
21 April 2003	Blackburn Rovers	A	0 – 0		28,862
26 April 2003	Arsenal	H	2 – 2	Djorkaeff 74', Keown 84' (og)	27,253
3 May 2003	Southampton	A	0 – 0		30,951
11 May 2003	Middlesbrough	H	2 – 1	Frandsen 10', Okocha 21'	27,241

Pos	Team	Pld	W	D	L	GF	GA	GD	Pts	Qualification or relegation
15	Leeds United	38	14	5	19	58	57	+1	47	
16	Aston Villa	38	12	9	17	42	47	−5	45	
17	Bolton Wanderers	38	10	14	14	41	51	−10	44	
18	West Ham United (R)	38	10	12	16	42	59	−17	42	Relegation to Football League First Division
19	West Bromwich Albion (R)	38	6	8	24	29	65	−36	26	Relegation to Football League First Division

Source: Premier League
Rules for classification: 1) points; 2) goal difference; 3) number of goals scored.
(R) Relegated

=== FA Cup ===
Date	Round	Opponents	H / A	Result F – A	Scorers	Attendance
4 January 2003	Round 3	Sunderland	H	1 – 1	Ricketts 18'	10,123
14 February 2003	Round 3 replay	Sunderland	A	0 – 2 (aet)		14,550

=== Coca-Cola Cup ===
Date	Round	Opponents	H / A	Result F – A	Scorers	Attendance
2 October 2002	Round 2	Bury	H	0 – 1		12,621

== Statistics ==
=== Appearances ===
Bolton used a total of 32 players during the season.

P	Player	Position	PL	FAC	LC	Total
1	(Finland) Jussi Jääskeläinen	Goalkeeper	38 (0)	0 (0)	0 (0)	38 (0)
2	(France) Youri Djorkaeff	Midfielder	36 (0)	1 (0)	0 (0)	37 (0)
3	(Denmark) Per Frandsen	Midfielder	34 (0)	0 (0)	0 (0)	34 (0)
4=	(Denmark) Henrik Pedersen	Striker	31 (2)	0 (0)	0 (1)	31 (3)
4=	(Spain) Iván Campo	Defender/Midfielder	28 (3)	2 (0)	1 (0)	31 (3)
6	(Jamaica) Ricardo Gardner	Midfielder	31 (1)	0 (0)	0 (0)	31 (1)
7	(Iceland) Guðni Bergsson	Defender	31 (0)	0 (0)	0 (0)	31 (0)
8	(England) Simon Charlton	Defender	27 (4)	0 (0)	0 (0)	27 (4)
9	(Nigeria) Jay-Jay Okocha	Midfielder	26 (5)	0 (1)	0 (0)	26 (6)
10	(France) Bruno Ngotty	Defender	23 (0)	1 (0)	0 (0)	24 (0)
11	(England) Anthony Barness	Defender	21 (4)	1 (0)	0 (0)	22 (4)
12	(France) Bernard Mendy	Defender	20 (1)	1 (0)	1 (0)	22 (1)
13	(England) Kevin Nolan	Midfielder	15 (18)	1 (1)	0 (1)	16 (20)
14	(England) Mike Whitlow	Defender	14 (3)	1 (1)	0 (0)	15 (4)
15	(England) Michael Ricketts	Striker	13 (9)	1 (0)	0 (0)	14 (9)
16	(France) Florent Laville	Defender	10 (0)	0 (0)	0 (0)	10 (0)
17	(Republic of Ireland) Gareth Farrelly	Midfielder	6 (2)	2 (0)	0 (0)	8 (2)
18	(Denmark) Stig Tøfting	Midfielder	2 (6)	2 (0)	1 (0)	5 (6)
19	(England) Dean Holdsworth	Striker	5 (4)	0 (0)	0 (1)	5 (5)
20	(England) Paul Warhurst	Defender/Midfielder	5 (2)	0 (1)	0 (0)	5 (3)
21	(Grenada) Delroy Facey	Striker	1 (8)	2 (0)	0 (0)	3 (8)
22=	(England) Kevin Poole	Goalkeeper	0 (0)	2 (0)	1 (0)	3 (0)
22=	(England) Jeff Smith	Midfielder	0 (0)	2 (0)	1 (0)	3 (0)
24	(England) Danny Livesey	Defender	0 (2)	1 (0)	1 (0)	2 (2)
25	(Turkey) Bülent Akın	Midfielder	0 (1)	1 (0)	1 (0)	2 (1)
26=	(Republic of Ireland) Jonathan Walters	Striker	0 (4)	0 (1)	1 (0)	1 (5)
26=	(Spain) Salva Ballesta	Striker	1 (5)	0 (0)	0 (0)	1 (5)
28	(Jamaica) Jermaine Johnson	Midfielder	0 (2)	0 (0)	1 (0)	1 (2)
29	(England) Nicky Hunt	Defender	0 (0)	1 (1)	0 (0)	1 (1)
30=	(England) Chris Armstrong	Striker	0 (0)	0 (0)	1 (0)	1 (0)
30=	(England) David Holdsworth	Defender	0 (0)	0 (0)	1 (0)	1 (0)
32	(France) Pierre-Yves André	Striker	0 (9)	0 (0)	0 (0)	0 (9)

=== Top scorers ===
P	Player	Position	PL	FAC	LC	Total
1=	(France) Youri Djorkaeff	Midfielder	7	0	0	7
1=	(Nigeria) Jay-Jay Okocha	Midfielder	7	0	0	7
1=	(Denmark) Henrik Pedersen	Striker	7	0	0	7
4	(England) Michael Ricketts	Striker	6	1	0	7
5	Own Goals		3	0	0	3
