= Dean Holdsworth =

English footballer (born 1968)

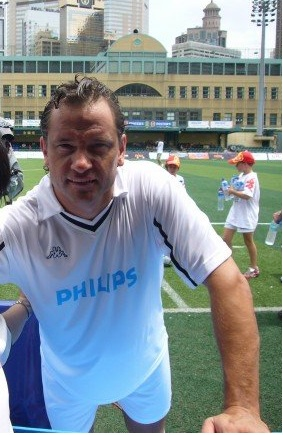
- Holdsworth pictured in 2007

Personal information
- Full name: Dean Christopher Holdsworth
- Date of birth: 8 November 1968 (age 57)
- Place of birth: Walthamstow, England
- Height: 5 ft 11 in (1.80 m)
- Position: Forward

Team information
- Current team: Kidderminster Harriers (technical director)

Youth career
- –1986: Watford

Senior career*
Years	Team	Apps	(Gls)
1986–1989	Watford	16	(3)
1988	→ Carlisle United (loan)	4	(1)
1988	→ Port Vale (loan)	6	(2)
1988	→ Swansea City (loan)	5	(1)
1988	→ Brentford (loan)	7	(1)
1989–1992	Brentford	110	(53)
1992–1997	Wimbledon	167	(58)
1997–2003	Bolton Wanderers	158	(39)
2002	→ Coventry City (loan)	6	(0)
2003	Coventry City	11	(0)
2003	Rushden & Diamonds	7	(2)
2003–2004	Wimbledon	28	(3)
2004–2005	Havant & Waterlooville	42	(24)
2005–2006	Derby County	3	(0)
2006	Weymouth	4	(0)
2006	Heybridge Swifts	6	(5)
2006	Havant & Waterlooville	6	(1)
2007	Cambridge United	3	(1)
2007	Newport County	12	(3)
2007–2008	Redbridge	0	(0)
Total		601	(197)

International career
1994	England B	1	(1)

Managerial career
- 2007–2008: Redbridge
- 2008–2011: Newport County
- 2011–2013: Aldershot Town
- 2013: Chelmsford City
- 2015: Brentwood Town
- 2022: Stratford Town
- * Club domestic league appearances and goals

Dean Christopher Holdsworth (born 8 November 1968) is an English former professional football player and manager who is the technical director at National League club Kidderminster Harriers. As a striker he scored 257 goals in 726 league and cup games over a 22-year career. Despite playing for 16 clubs in 19 spells the majority of his goals and appearances came at Brentford, Wimbledon, and Bolton Wanderers. He is the twin brother of David Holdsworth.

As a player, he started his career at Watford in 1986, where he spent three years before signing with Brentford, following a short loan spell. A highly successful three years followed before he was signed by Wimbledon in 1992. After an impressive five-year spell, he transferred to Bolton Wanderers. He spent six years at Bolton before, in 2003, joining Coventry City, Rushden & Diamonds and then back to Wimbledon. In 2004, he signed with Havant & Waterlooville, where he spent one season before joining Derby County as player–assistant manager. In 2006, he dropped out of the Football League for the final time, joining Weymouth. Short spells followed at Heybridge Swifts, Cambridge United, and Newport County.

His management career started at Redbridge in 2007. After one season there, he took the reins at Newport County. In his second season with the club, he took them to the Conference South title with 28 points to spare. In January 2011, he switched clubs to take charge at League Two side Aldershot Town until his dismissal in February 2013. He took charge at Chelmsford City in May 2013 before resigning five months later. He returned to management for five months with Brentwood Town in June 2015. In March 2016, he led a consortium to purchase Bolton Wanderers. A year later, he sold his shares to fellow co-owner Ken Anderson due to disagreements with how he ran the club. he He joined Kidderminster Harriers as technical director in December 2023.

== Playing career ==
=== Watford ===
Holdsworth primarily played as a striker, although he tended to play off the front man in the latter part of his career. He was a pacey striker with good shooting ability. He started his career at Watford, who finished ninth in the First Division in 1986–87 under Graham Taylor's stewardship, before suffering relegation in 1987–88 under Dave Bassett and then Steve Harrison. He was loaned out to Carlisle United towards the end of the campaign and scored once in four Fourth Division games for Clive Middlemass. He joined John Rudge's Port Vale in March. He scored twice at Vale Park in six Third Division appearances. He started 1988–89 on loan at Terry Yorath's Swansea City, and returned to Vicarage Road after one goal in five Third Division games. He then joined Steve Perryman's Brentford on loan, before joining the club permanently for £125,000 in September 1989.

=== Brentford ===
He was to prove himself as a prolific goalscorer for the "Bees", as the club moved from 13th in 1989–90 to the play-offs in 1990–91, before Holdsworth scored 38 goals in the Third Division championship winning season of 1991–92, in a fruitful partnership with Gary Blissett. For this achievement he was named on the PFA Team of the Year. Phil Holder was unable to keep him at Griffin Park following these exploits.

=== Wimbledon ===
He signed for Joe Kinnear's Wimbledon in the middle of 1992 for £650,000. He made an immediate impact in his first season at the "Dons", becoming the club's top scorer and the Premier League's third highest scorer with 19 goals, after forming a solid partnership with John Fashanu. During his time at Selhurst Park, eccentric club chairman Sam Hammam promised to buy Holdsworth a Ferrari sports car and even a camel if he managed to score 20 league goals in a season. However, Holdsworth never quite managed to reach that target. He hit 17 league and seven cup goals in 1993–94, including a hat-trick against Oldham Athletic on 26 April 1994. He was less prolific in 1994–95, though Wimbledon still finished in ninth place. He hit 16 goals in 1995–96, to become the club's joint-top scorer, along with strike partner Efan Ekoku. He hit nine goals in 1996–97, before he was signed to Bolton Wanderers in October 1997 for £3.5million, which was a record signing for Bolton at that time.

=== Bolton Wanderers ===
He scored just three goals in 17 Premier League starts in 1997–98, as Colin Todd's side slipped out of the top-flight after finishing 18th, behind 17th place Everton on goal difference. He rediscovered his scoring touch in the First Division, hitting 12 goals in 26 starts in 1998–99. He then hit 14 goals from 24 league starts in 1999–2000, as Sam Allardyce led Bolton to the semi-finals of the play-offs, the FA Cup and the League Cup. He scored 15 goals from 29 starts in 2000–01, including a hat-trick past Scunthorpe United in a 5–1 win at the Reebok Stadium. The "Trotters" reached the play-off final, and beat Preston North End 3–0 at the Millennium Stadium to regain their top-flight status. He was restricted to nine league starts and 22 substitute appearances in 2001–02, scoring once each against Liverpool and Tottenham Hotspur. He made 10 goalless appearances in 2002–03, though was briefly joined in Lancashire by his brother David for the first time since leaving Watford.

=== Later career ===
He joined Coventry City on loan in December 2002, making six goalless appearances, before he signed permanently for the club the following month. He scored once in the FA Cup against Cardiff City. However, he failed to find the net in his eleven league games and moved on to Brian Talbot's Rushden & Diamonds on a non-contract basis in March. Diamonds topped the Third Division in 2002–03, though Holdsworth left Nene Park in the summer. He returned to Wimbledon for the 2003–04 campaign, as the club relocated to Milton Keynes. He scored three goals in 28 games in 2003–04. He then spent the 2004–05 season with Havant & Waterlooville in the Conference South. He then joined Derby County, where he was appointed as assistant manager, but played as a striker during an injury crisis, leaving the club when manager Phil Brown was sacked in January 2006. He finished the 2005–06 season with spells in non-league football at Weymouth and Heybridge Swifts. Holdsworth returned to Havant & Waterlooville for the opening months of the 2006–07 season, before joining Cambridge United in the new year. Holdsworth joined Newport County on a short-term contract in February 2007 and was released by manager Peter Beadle at the end of the 2006–07 season, after playing in the 2007 FAW Premier Cup final defeat to The New Saints.

== International career ==
Holdsworth earned an England B cap in the 4–2 win against Northern Ireland B on 10 May 1994 at Hillsborough Stadium, Sheffield, scoring the opening goal for England's B team.

== Managerial career ==
=== Redbridge ===
Holdsworth was appointed as player-manager of Isthmian League Division One North club Redbridge in July 2007. The club finished third in 2007–08 before losing to Canvey Island in the play-off final, following a penalty shoot-out.

=== Newport County ===
He made a return to Newport County in May 2008 as their new manager in succession to Peter Beadle, after handing in his resignation at Redbridge. He also relocated to Worcester to accommodate his new role at Newport. After a poor start to the 2008–09 season, Newport improved in the second half of the season to finish tenth in the league. Holdsworth was awarded the Conference South Manager of the Month award for April 2009. His signings included Craig Reid, Danny Rose, Paul Bignot, Jamie Collins, Charlie Henry, Sam Foley and Gary Warren.

In September 2009 Holdsworth was again named the Conference South Manager of the Month after Newport County started the 2009–10 season with a run of 13 league matches unbeaten. He also won the awards for November 2009 and February 2010. On 15 March 2010, Newport County achieved promotion to the Conference National as champions with seven matches remaining and completed the season with a record 103 points, 28 points ahead of second placed Dover Athletic.

In June 2010, Holdsworth signed a new two-year contract with Newport, and was also awarded the Conference South Manager of the Year Award. Holdsworth was selected as Conference National Manager of the Month for September 2010 after a run of five consecutive wins for Newport County. He left the club in January of the 2010–11 campaign, with Newport County lying in the play-off zone of the Conference National. The "Exiles" finished the season in ninth place under Anthony Hudson's stewardship.

=== Aldershot Town ===
In January 2011 he was announced as the new manager of League Two side Aldershot Town. Holdsworth wasted no time making his mark on the team, bringing in forwards Peter Vincenti, Tim Sills, and Alex Rodman – as well as defender Simon Grand on loan from Fleetwood – before the end of the month. There were also players leaving the club during this period of transition, with both Glen Little and Wesley Ngo Baheng being released, whilst Anthony Straker and Damian Spencer were sent out on loan. Holdsworth's first game in charge resulted in a creditable 1–1 draw away to high-flying Bury, and he also improved on Aldershot's poor home form; winning his first game at "The Rec" 1–0 against Bradford City, whilst a last-minute Luke Guttridge free-kick gave the "Shots" a second consecutive home win 3–2 against Crewe. He continued attempting to strengthen the squad throughout February, with loan signings Albert Jarrett and Luke Medley from Lincoln and Mansfield, respectively, though neither had a large impact on the team with only a handful of appearances between them. Holdsworth also signed former "Shots" goalkeeper Mikhael Jaimez-Ruiz, who made 62 appearances in a previous spell at the club. On the pitch, Aldershot went on a run of five consecutive draws, the first away to league leaders Chesterfield who required a late equaliser to rescue a point.

His team went unbeaten throughout March to ensure the club's survival in the Football League. The upturn in form prompted speculation that the team could mount a charge for the play-offs. Though the club could only draw in their final game of the month at home to Accrington Stanley, Aldershot were left only seven points behind seventh-placed Rotherham United. March also saw defender Jamie Vincent released from the club after not featuring in Holdsworth's first-team plans, as well as a first-team opportunity for youth team winger Adam Mekki. The "Shots" continued their unbeaten run into the first half of April before defeat finally came at home to Burton Albion. At the end of the campaign Aldershot posted a comfortable mid-table finish, and Holdsworth handed out contracts to young players Adam Mekki, Doug Bergqvist and Henrik Breimyr. He also released nine players in Ben Harding, John Halls, Marvin Morgan, Damian Spencer, Tim Sills, Mikhael Jaimez-Ruiz, Wade Small, Clayton Fortune, and Jack Randall.

He assembled a number of free signings to replenish his squad: strikers Bradley Bubb and Michael Rankine; midfielders Anthony Pulis and Graeme Montgomery; defenders Aaron Brown and Jamie Collins; and goalkeeper Ross Worner. He also brought in a total of eight loanees in the first half of the season: Jake Taylor, Jordan Brown, Bruno Andrade, Adam Smith, Scott Davies, Jamie Day, Greg Pearson and Charlie Henry. His team proved to be inconsistent, though they did reach the fourth round of the League Cup, where they were beaten 3–0 by a Manchester United side that included Dimitar Berbatov, Michael Owen, and Antonio Valencia. In the January transfer window he released Graeme Montgomery and Anthony Pulis, whilst making four new loan signings in defenders Troy Brown and Sonny Bradley, midfielder Josh Payne, and striker Charlie Collins. He also recruited defender Chris Doig, and attempted to bolster his side's poor goalscoring record by paying a five figure fee for Cameroonian striker Guy Madjo. He also signed Stefan Payne, Wilko Risser and Josh Payne, as well as loanees Ben Smith, Darren Murphy, Michael Doughty, and Rob Sinclair. To make room for these signings he offloaded Jermaine McGlashan, Jamie Collins, Luke Guttridge, Chris Doig and Aaron Brown. The "Shots" finished the season just outside the play-offs.

"Sometimes you have to be an accountant as [well as] a football manager. It does come down to money. When you come to a club with financial constraints in the division, it was always a challenge to make sure we were a League club. I want to carry on that. The only way forward for a club like ours is loans. We don't have the finances for 52-week contracts but we also have to be realistic to know what sort of players we are going to bring in. We need to bring in players who need to have a point to prove and need to perform."

— Holdsworth, speaking in November 2012.

Holdsworth signed a new one-year extension to his contract with the club in June 2012, tying him to the club until summer 2014. The next month he rejected the opportunity to take over as manager of League One club Crawley Town. Over the summer he signed goalkeeper Glenn Morris, defenders Olly Lancashire and Guy Branston, and midfielders Craig Stanley and Harry Cooksley. Holdsworth targeted the play-offs for the 2012–13 season, though said that "our aim is, first and foremost, staying in the division." Over the course of the season he also added Sonny Bradley (on loan), Danny Rose (on loan), Kieron Cadogan, Oliver Risser, Asa Hall (on loan), and Anthony McNamee to his squad. He led Aldershot to the fourth round of the FA Cup for the first time in the club's history. On 20 February 2013 he was sacked by Aldershot, three days after his twin brother David Holdsworth was sacked as manager of Lincoln City, and one day after Aldershot recorded a 1–0 victory over Torquay United. At the time of his sacking Aldershot were in 20th position in League Two having taken only seven points from the last seven games.

=== Chelmsford City ===
Holdsworth was appointed manager at Conference South side Chelmsford City in May 2013. However, after eight defeats in 13 league games his contract with Chelmsford was ended by mutual consent in November 2013.

=== Brentwood Town ===
He was appointed director of football at Isthmian League Premier club Brentwood Town in June 2015 and also took up the vacant management role at the club. He resigned in November 2015 due to his growing business commitments. His primary focus was as a business consultant for Sport Shield Consultancy, a consortium seeking to buy into Bolton Wanderers.

=== Stratford Town ===
On 19 May 2022, Holdsworth was appointed manager of Stratford Town of the Southern League Premier Central, where the chairman noted that he had "a lot of managerial experience on budget constraints". He left the role in September, stating that his growing business commitments made him unable to focus on his role as manager.

== Football administration ==
Holdsworth is a former chairman of the Professional Footballers' Association and founder of the Non-League Footballers Association (NLFA).

=== Bolton Wanderers ===
In March 2016, Holdsworth led a consortium to purchase Bolton Wanderers, who were lying at the bottom of the Championship table and heading for administration, and upon completion of the takeover appointed himself as chief executive. However, he moved to the position of Director of football before the start of the 2016–17 season, but left the role less than a month later. He had a public falling out with chairman Ken Anderson over the sale of Zach Clough in January 2017 and sold out his share of the club to Anderson two months later. He resigned his directorship of the club in August 2017.

=== Kidderminster Harriers ===
In December 2023, he was appointed as technical director at National League club Kidderminster Harriers, with the club saying it was "a significant milestone in the club's journey following promotion".

== Outside football ==
Holdsworth was involved in tabloid scandal in 1996 when he had a highly publicised extramarital affair with topless model Linsey Dawn McKenzie, who was then aged 17. In December 1999 he was sentenced to 18 months probation for punching his wife Samantha Holdsworth.

Holdsworth appeared in the reality television series Deadline where ten celebrities had to produce their own weekly celebrity magazine. He was the sixth celebrity to be sacked by Janet Street-Porter. He also participated in the second series of Sky One reality TV series Cirque de Celebrité. The judges voted him out in the first episode on 7 October 2007. Tamara (another contestant) joined him in the bottom two, but the three judges voted to stay in the competition. However, because of a technical fault with the voting, Dean was asked to re-join the show.

Holdsworth married Susanna Cobham in June 2010. David Holdsworth, who was also a professional footballer is Dean's twin brother. On 18 September 2010, they became the first twins to manage against each other in the top five divisions of English football, when Dean was manager of Newport County and David manager of Mansfield Town – Newport won the match 1–0.

== Career statistics ==
=== Playing statistics ===
Appearances and goals by club, season and competition
Club	Season	League			FA Cup		League Cup		Other		Total	
Club	Season	Division	Apps	Goals	Apps	Goals	Apps	Goals	Apps	Goals	Apps	Goals
Watford	1987–88	First Division	2	0	0	0	0	0	1 (Note: Appearance(s) in Full Members' Cup)	0	3	0
Watford	1988–89	Second Division	10	2	0	0	0	0	3 (Note: One appearance in Full Members' Cup, two appearances in Second Division play-offs)	0	13	2
Watford	1989–90	Second Division	4	1	0	0	0	0	0	0	4	1
Watford	Total		16	3	0	0	0	0	4	0	20	3
Carlisle United (loan)	1987–88	Fourth Division	4	1	—		—		—		4	1
Port Vale (loan)	1987–88	Third Division	6	2	—		—		—		6	2
Swansea City (loan)	1988–89	Third Division	5	1	—		—		—		5	1
Brentford (loan)	1988–89	Third Division	7	1	—		—		—		7	1
Brentford	1989–90	Third Division	39	24	1	0	1	0	4 (Note: Appearance(s) in Football League Trophy)	4	45	28
Brentford	1990–91	Third Division	30	5	2	3	2	0	7 (Note: Five appearances and one goal in Football League Trophy, two appearances in Third Division play-offs)	1	41	9
Brentford	1991–92	Third Division	41	24	3	4	5	6	3	4	52	38
Brentford	Total		110	53	6	7	8	6	14	9	138	75
Wimbledon	1992–93	Premier League	34	19	3	0	3	0	—		40	19
Wimbledon	1993–94	Premier League	42	17	3	3	6	4	—		51	24
Wimbledon	1994–95	Premier League	28	7	3	0	2	1	—		33	8
Wimbledon	1995–96	Premier League	33	10	5	2	2	4	—		40	16
Wimbledon	1996–97	Premier League	25	5	6	2	5	2	—		36	9
Wimbledon	1997–98	Premier League	5	0	0	0	1	0	—		6	0
Wimbledon	Total		167	58	20	7	19	11	—		206	76
Bolton Wanderers	1997–98	Premier League	20	3	0	0	—		—		20	3
Bolton Wanderers	1998–99	First Division	32	12	1	0	4	0	—		37	12
Bolton Wanderers	1999–2000	First Division	35	11	2	0	5	1	2 (Note: Appearance(s) in First Division play-offs)	3	44	15
Bolton Wanderers	2000–01	First Division	31	11	3	3	2	1	3		39	15
Bolton Wanderers	2001–02	Premier League	31	2	1	0	4	2	—		36	4
Bolton Wanderers	2002–03	Premier League	9	0	—		1	0	—		10	0
Bolton Wanderers	Total		158	39	7	3	16	4	5	3	186	49
Coventry City	2002–03 (Note: Part of this season was spent on loan from Bolton Wanderers)	First Division	17	0	3	1	—		—		20	1
Rushden & Diamonds	2002–03	Third Division	7	2	—		—		—		7	2
Wimbledon	2003–04	First Division	28	3	2	0	1	0	—		31	3
Havant & Waterlooville	2004–05	Conference South	40	24	1	0	—		10 (Note: Five appearances and four goals in FA Trophy, four appearances and three goals in Conference League Cup, one appearance and two goals in Hampshire Senior Cup)	9	51	33
Havant & Waterlooville	2005–06	Conference South	2	0	—		—		—		2	0
Havant & Waterlooville	Total		42	24	1	0	—		10	9	53	33
Derby County	2005–06	Championship	3	0	1	0	0	0	0	0	4	0
Weymouth	2005–06	Conference South	4	0	—		—		—		4	0
Heybridge Swifts	2005–06	Isthmian League; Premier Division	6	5	—		—		1 (Note: Appearance(s) in Isthmian League Premier Division play-offs)	0	7	5
Havant & Waterlooville	2006–07	Conference South	6	1	4	0	—		3 (Note: Two appearances in FA Trophy, one appearance in Hampshire Senior Cup)	0	13	1
Cambridge United	2006–07	Conference Premier	3	1	—		—		—		3	1
Newport County	2006–07	Conference South	12	3	—		—		0	0	12	3
Redbridge	2007–08	Isthmian League; Division One North	0	0	0	0	—		0	0	0	0
Career total			601	197	44	18	44	21	37	21	726	257

=== Managerial statistics ===
Managerial record by team and tenure
Team	From	To	Record					Ref
Team	From	To	P	W	D	L	Win %	Ref
Aldershot Town	11 January 2011	20 February 2013	118	42	34	42	35.6	

== Honours ==
=== Player ===
Brentford

- Football League Third Division: 1991–92

Bolton Wanderers

- Football League First Division play-offs: 2001

Rushden & Diamonds

- Football League Third Division: 2002–03

Newport County

- FAW Premier Cup runner-up: 2006–07

Individual

- PFA Team of the Year: 1991–92 Third Division
- Brentford Hall of Fame (inducted 2013)

=== Manager ===
Newport County

- Conference South: 2009–10

Individual

- Conference South Manager of the Month: April 2009, September 2009, November 2009, February 2010
- Conference South Manager of the Year: 2009–10
- Conference Premier Manager of the Month: September 2010
- Football League Two Manager of the Month: March 2011
