= Hasney Aljofree =

English footballer

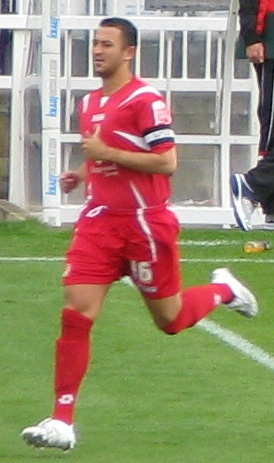

Personal information
- Full name: Hasney Aljofree
- Date of birth: 11 July 1978 (age 48)
- Place of birth: Blackley, Manchester, England
- Height: 6 ft 0 in (1.83 m)
- Position: Centre-back

Team information
- Current team: Kerala Blasters (assistant coach)

Youth career
- 1995–1996: Manchester United
- 1996–1997: Bolton Wanderers

Senior career*
Years	Team	Apps	(Gls)
1997–2000	Bolton Wanderers	14	(0)
2000–2002	Dundee United	54	(4)
2002–2007	Plymouth Argyle	117	(3)
2004	→ Sheffield Wednesday (loan)	2	(0)
2007	→ Oldham Athletic (loan)	5	(0)
2007–2010	Swindon Town	57	(2)
2010	Oldham Athletic	1	(0)
Total		250	(9)

International career
1995	England U18	1	(0)

Managerial career
- 2010: Oldham Athletic (youth)
- 2010–2011: Oldham Athletic (reserve team)
- 2012–2018: Manchester United (youth technical coach)
- 2018–2020: Manchester United (youth)
- 2021–2024: Manchester United (youth)
- 2024–2026: Singapore (Head of Coach Education & Development)
- 2026–: Kerala Blasters (assistant coach)
- * Club domestic league appearances and goals

Hasney Aljofree (born 11 July 1978) is an English professional football manager and former footballer who played as a defender. He is currently the assistant coach of Indian Super League club Kerala Blasters.

Aljofree began his career with Manchester United, during which time he earned one cap for the England U18 side. He joined Bolton Wanderers in 1996 and made his first-team debut the following year. Aljofree moved on to Dundee United in 2000 and spent a productive two years with the club, scoring his first four goals in league competition. He linked up with Paul Sturrock for a second time at Plymouth Argyle, where he enjoyed the most successful period of his career to date. Having gained his first league winners medal in 2004, Aljofree played an important role in re-establishing the club in the second tier of English football. He spent time on loan with Sheffield Wednesday and Oldham Athletic before being signed by Swindon Town; linking up with Sturrock for a fourth time.

Aljofree captained the side on numerous occasions, but was also hampered by injury problems, one of which kept him sidelined for 10 months. He was released from his contract in 2010 and then signed for Oldham Athletic on a short-term contract.

Hasney Aljofree has 2 sons: Sonny Aljofree (2004) and Rocco Aljofree (2011).

== Playing career ==
=== Early career ===
Aljofree started his career as a youth player with Manchester United, a move to Bolton Wanderers in July 1996. He made 22 first-team appearances for Bolton before being transferred in 2000 to Scottish Premier League side Dundee United, who were managed at the time by Paul Sturrock. Aljofree scored his first goal in his fourth match for the club, netting in a 2–1 defeat to St Johnstone, and he scored again in December, again in a defeat. Established as a first-team regular, Aljofree scored five times in the 2001–02 season, finishing on the winning side every time. After starting one match at the beginning of the following season, Aljofree was released from Tannadice, subsequently moving to by English Second Division side Plymouth Argyle, now managed by Sturrock.

=== Plymouth Argyle ===
During the 2004–05 season, he moved on loan to Sheffield Wednesday, again managed by Sturrock, and many thought that the manager would sign Aljofree again permanently. After just two appearances for Wednesday, he picked up an injury and returned to Argyle. Following the injury, he continued to make regular starts for Plymouth Argyle and captained the side during a pre-season friendly against Real Madrid in 2006. He appeared to have picked up a serious injury after 31 minutes of an away game against Southampton on 16 September 2006 and left the field on a stretcher with a neck brace. It was soon announced that he had been taken to hospital, and announced that he had suffered no injury at all.

In January 2007, Aljofree caused controversy with a goal celebration after scoring in a 2006–07 FA Cup match at Peterborough United. After celebrating in front of the opposing fans, bottles were thrown at the player, prompting a police investigation. Aljofree made a written apology to Peterborough fans, which was displayed on the club's official website, with then-Plymouth manager Ian Holloway saying, "To celebrate like that was a disgrace and I would have thrown a bottle at him myself."

=== Swindon Town ===
Aljofree had his fourth spell with manager Paul Sturrock by signing for Swindon Town in 2007, although Sturrock left for his former club, Plymouth Argyle, in November 2007, after naming Aljofree as Swindon's captain for the 2007–08 season. Under the management of Maurice Malpas he retained the captaincy.

As Malpas' Swindon team struggled at the wrong end of the table, Aljofree performances followed suit as he received criticism from the fans of a lack of leadership and under-par performances. Aljofree hit back publicly by telling the Swindon Advertiser that the felt the players were "scared to play at the County Ground", a statement that received widespread ridicule from the Swindon faithful, as they expected results to turn around.

A month later, Aljofree captained the Swindon team to a 1–0 defeat at Conference side Histon in the FA Cup, with an ankle injury keeping him out of the next two games, by which time Maurice Malpas had been given the sack. Aljofree is yet to play under current manager Danny Wilson as a knee injury forced him off in a relegation battle with Yeovil, a week prior to Wilson's arrival on Boxing Day. The knee injury was expected to keep him out of the festive period only, however, in early January, Aljofree underwent surgery on the injury, extending his layoff for another 5 weeks. To add insult to injury, during his five-week recovery period it was announced he would have to have another operation, keeping him out for the remainder of the season.

On 20 October 2009, Aljofree made a return to football, playing 45 minutes for Swindon Reserves in a match against his old side Plymouth, after 10 months out of action. However, with stiff competition for defensive roles at the club, Aljofree has accepted that he may need to head out on loan to regain full recovery.

On 1 February 2010, Aljofree's tenure with Swindon Town came to an end as it was announced that the player had left the club after both the player and club agreed to terminate his contract.

=== Return to Oldham ===
On 3 February 2010, Aljofree signed a pay-as-you-play contract with Oldham Athletic until the end of the 2009–10 season. He was released after the 3–0 defeat to Yeovil, his only start in an Oldham shirt.

== Managerial career ==
=== Oldham ===
Aljofree returned to Oldham Athletic for a third time in November 2010 as a coach for the under-14 side, having been forced to retire as a professional footballer after a 14-year career.

=== Manchester United ===
In 2011, Aljofree was recruited by Manchester United to be their Under 15 assistant coach. The following year, he was promoted to head coach of the under 13 side while from 2013 until 2015, Aljofree was then shifted to become the head coach coordinator.

In 2015, Aljofree was selected to become the Under 19 technical coach in their 2018–19 UEFA Youth League campaign. He also guided the team to finished at the top of the group stage table with 5 wins and 1 draw thus qualifying to the Round of 16. Aljofree was also then chosen to be the head coach of the under 14 side until 2018 where he was promoted to become the under 16 head coach and also under 17 technical coach until 2020.

=== Singapore ===
On 21 August 2024, Aljofree became the Head of Coach Education & Development of Football Association of Singapore (FAS).

== Personal life ==
Aljofree was born to a Singaporean-Yemeni father and a British mother.

Aljofree's son, Sonny (born 2004) is also a footballer and is part of the Manchester United academy.

== Career statistics ==
Appearances and goals by club, season and competition
Club	Season	League			National cup (Note: Includes Scottish Cup, FA Cup)		League cup (Note: Includes Scottish League Cup, Football League Cup)		Other		Total	
Club	Season	Division	Apps	Goals	Apps	Goals	Apps	Goals	Apps	Goals	Apps	Goals
Bolton Wanderers	1997–98	Premier League	2	0	0	0	0	0	0	0	2	0
Bolton Wanderers	1998–99	First Division	4	0	0	0	1	0	0	0	5	0
Bolton Wanderers	1999–2000	First Division	8	0	2	0	5	0	0	0	15	0
Bolton Wanderers	Total		14	0	2	0	6	0	0	0	22	0
Dundee United	2000–01	Scottish Premier League	26	2	2	0	3	0	0	0	31	2
Dundee United	2001–02	Scottish Premier League	27	2	4	3	3	0	0	0	34	5
Dundee United	2002–03	Scottish Premier League	1	0	0	0	0	0	0	0	1	0
Dundee United	Total		54	4	6	3	6	0	0	0	66	7
Plymouth Argyle	2002–03	Second Division	19	1	1	0	1	0	1 (Note: Appearance(s) in Football League Trophy)	0	22	1
Plymouth Argyle	2003–04	Second Division	24	0	0	0	1	0	1	0	26	0
Plymouth Argyle	2004–05	Championship	12	1	0	0	0	0	0	0	12	1
Plymouth Argyle	2005–06	Championship	37	1	1	0	0	0	0	0	38	1
Plymouth Argyle	2006–07	Championship	25	0	3	2	1	0	0	0	29	2
Plymouth Argyle	Total		117	3	5	2	3	0	2	0	127	5
Sheffield Wednesday (loan)	2004–05	League One	2	0	0	0	0	0	1	0	3	0
Oldham Athletic (loan)	2006–07	League One	5	0	0	0	0	0	0	0	5	0
Swindon Town	2007–08	League One	39	2	4	1	1	0	0	0	44	3
Swindon Town	2008–09	League One	18	0	1	0	1	0	0	0	20	0
Swindon Town	2009–10	League One	0	0	0	0	0	0	0	0	0	0
Swindon Town	Total		57	2	5	1	2	0	0	0	64	3
Oldham Athletic	2009–10	League One	1	0	0	0	0	0	0	0	1	0
Career total			250	9	18	6	17	0	3	0	290	15

== Honours ==
Plymouth Argyle

- Football League Second Division: 2003–04
