= 1987–88 Watford F.C. season =

English football team season

Watford
1987–88 season
- Chairman: Elton John
- Manager: Dave Bassett (until 11 January 1988); Steve Harrison (from 11 January 1988)
- Stadium: Vicarage Road
- First Division: 20th (relegated)
- FA Cup: Sixth round (eliminated by Wimbledon)
- League Cup: Fourth round (eliminated by Manchester City)
- Full Members' Cup: Third round (eliminated by Ipswich Town)

The 1987–88 season was Watford's 107th season in existence, and their sixth season in the First Division, following promotion in the 1981–82 season, in which they finished 20th, and were relegated back to the Second Division. Along with the First Division, they competed in the FA Cup and Football League Cup, being eliminated in the sixth round and fourth round respectively.

== Competitions ==
=== First Division ===
==== League table ====
Pos	Team	Pld	W	D	L	GF	GA	GD	Pts	Qualification or relegation
17	Charlton Athletic	40	9	15	16	38	52	−14	42	
18	Chelsea (R)	40	9	15	16	50	68	−18	42	Qualified for Second Division play-offs
19	Portsmouth (R)	40	7	14	19	36	66	−30	35	Relegated to Second Division
20	Watford (R)	40	7	11	22	27	51	−24	32	Relegated to Second Division
21	Oxford United (R)	40	6	13	21	44	80	−36	31	Relegated to Second Division

Source: World Football
Rules for classification: 1) Points; 2) Goal difference; 3) Goals scored
(R) Relegated

==== Matches ====
First Division match results
Date	Opponent	Venue	Result F–A	Scorers	Attendance
15 August 1987	Wimbledon	H	1–0	Blissett	15,344
19 August 1987	Nottingham Forest	A	0–1		14,527
22 August 1987	Manchester United	A	0–2		38,582
29 August 1987	Tottenham Hotspur	H	1–1	Porter	19,073
5 September 1987	Norwich City	H	0–1		11,724
12 September 1987	Sheffield Wednesday	A	3–2	Porter, Sterling, Senior	16,144
19 September 1987	Portsmouth	H	0–0		13,277
26 September 1987	Chelsea	H	0–3		16,213
3 October 1987	Coventry City	A	0–1		16,111
17 October 1987	Southampton	A	0–1		11,933
24 October 1987	Everton	A	0–2		28,501
31 October 1987	West Ham United	H	1–2	Allen	14,427
7 November 1987	Queens Park Rangers	A	0–0		12,101
14 November 1987	Charlton Athletic	H	2–1	Allen, Roberts	12,093
21 November 1987	Oxford United	A	1–1	Blissett	7,811
24 November 1987	Liverpool	A	0–4		32,396
28 November 1987	Arsenal	H	2–0	Jackett, Blissett	19,598
5 December 1987	Derby County	A	1–1	Hodges	14,516
12 December 1987	Luton Town	H	0–1		12,152
26 December 1987	Sheffield Wednesday	H	1–3	Sterland (o.g.)	12,026
28 December 1987	Portsmouth	A	1–1	Agana	15,003
1 January 1988	Tottenham Hotspur	A	1–2	Morris	25,235
2 January 1988	Manchester United	H	0–1		18,038
16 January 1988	Wimbledon	A	2–1	Sterling, Allen (pen.)	6,848
23 January 1988	Nottingham Forest	H	0–0		13,158
6 February 1988	Norwich City	A	0–0		13,316
13 February 1988	Liverpool	H	1–4	Blissett	23,838
27 February 1988	Coventry City	H	0–1		12,052
5 March 1988	Southampton	H	0–1		11,824
19 March 1988	West Ham United	A	0–1		16,015
26 March 1988	Everton	H	1–2	Porter	13,503
29 March 1988	Chelsea	A	1–1	Rimmer	11,240
1 April 1988	Queens Park Rangers	H	0–1		16,083
4 April 1988	Charlton Athletic	A	0–1		6,196
9 April 1988	Oxford United	H	3–0	Holden, Hodges (2)	10,045
12 April 1988	Newcastle United	A	0–3		16,318
15 April 1988	Arsenal	A	1–0	Holden	19,541
19 April 1988	Newcastle United	H	1–1	Jackett	12,075
30 April 1988	Derby County	H	1–1	Roberts	14,181
2 May 1988	Luton Town	A	1–2	M. Johnson (o.g.)	10,409

=== FA Cup ===
FA Cup match results
Round	Date	Opponent	Venue	Result F–A	Scorers	Attendance
Third round	9 January 1988	Hull City	H	1–1	Allen	12,761
Third round replay	12 January 1988	Hull City	A	2–2 (a.e.t.)	Jackett (pen.), Allen	13,681
Third round, second replay	18 January 1988	Hull City	H	1–0	Allen	15,261
Fourth round	30 January 1988	Coventry City	A	1–0	Senior	22,479
Fifth round	20 February 1988	Port Vale	A	0–0		22,483
Fifth round replay	23 February 1988	Port Vale	H	2–0	Senior, Porter	18,359
Sixth round	12 March 1988	Wimbledon	A	1–2	Allen	12,228

=== League Cup ===
League Cup match results
Round	Date	Opponent	Venue	Result F–A	Scorers	Attendance
Second round, first leg	22 September 1987	Darlington	A	3–0	Porter, Senior, Gibbs	5,005
Second round, second leg	6 October 1987	Darlington	H	8–0	Terry, Roberts, Hetherston (2), Hodges, Agana, Gibbs, Blissett	8,186
Third round	28 October 1987	Swindon Town	A	1–1	Agana	13,833
Third round replay	3 November 1987	Swindon Town	H	4–2	Morris, Porter, Hodges, Allen	13,378
Fourth round	17 November 1987	Manchester City	A	1–3	Allen	20,357

=== Full Members' Cup ===
Full Members' Cup match results
Round	Date	Opponent	Venue	Result F–A	Scorers	Attendance
Third round	25 January 1988	Ipswich Town	A	2–5	Atkins (o.g.), Senior	7,466
