= Michael Ricketts =

English footballer (born 1978)

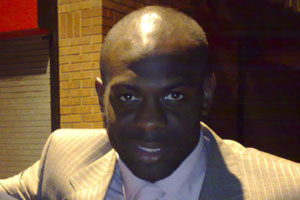
- Ricketts in 2007 while on loan at Walsall

Personal information
- Full name: Michael Barrington Ricketts
- Date of birth: 4 December 1978 (age 47)
- Place of birth: Birmingham, West Midlands, England
- Height: 6 ft 2 in (1.88 m)
- Position: Striker

Senior career*
| Years | Team | Apps | (Gls) |
| 1996–2000 | Walsall | 76 | (14) |
| 2000–2003 | Bolton Wanderers | 98 | (37) |
| 2003–2004 | Middlesbrough | 32 | (3) |
| 2004–2006 | Leeds United | 25 | (0) |
| 2005 | → Stoke City (loan) | 11 | (0) |
| 2005–2006 | → Cardiff City (loan) | 17 | (5) |
| 2006 | → Burnley (loan) | 13 | (2) |
| 2006–2007 | Southend United | 2 | (0) |
| 2007 | Preston North End | 14 | (1) |
| 2007–2008 | Oldham Athletic | 9 | (2) |
| 2007–2008 | → Walsall (loan) | 12 | (3) |
| 2008–2009 | Walsall | 28 | (9) |
| 2009–2010 | Tranmere Rovers | 12 | (2) |
| Total | | 349 | (78) |

International career
| 2002 | England | 1 | (0) |
- * Club domestic league appearances and goals

Michael Barrington Ricketts (born 4 December 1978) is an English former footballer. He played as a striker and was capped once by England, in a friendly against the Netherlands in 2002.

Ricketts had a 14-year career which saw him play for Walsall, Bolton Wanderers, Middlesbrough, Leeds United, Stoke City, Cardiff City, Burnley, Southend United, Preston North End, Oldham Athletic and Tranmere Rovers.

== Club career ==
=== Walsall ===
Ricketts began his career at Walsall, for which he signed in 1996. He made 76 league appearances for them, scoring 14 times.

=== Bolton Wanderers ===
In July 2000, First Division side Bolton Wanderers signed him for £400,000. He started his Bolton career in impressive style, scoring 24 times as they won promotion to the Premier League through the playoffs. His finest moments at Bolton Wanderers include sealing victory against Preston North End in the Division One Play-off final in 2001 and scoring the winning goal at Old Trafford in a 2–1 win for Bolton over Manchester United in the 2001–02 Premier League season.

Ricketts continued scoring in his first season in the Premier League, hitting 15 goals by February, and this form led to his call-up for England's friendly against the Netherlands in February 2002. Ricketts played 45 minutes in that game but failed to score, and subsequently did not score for Bolton again all season.

=== Middlesbrough ===
In January 2003, Middlesbrough spent £3.5 million to sign him from Bolton. He failed to recapture his goal-scoring form, netting just four times in 38 matches. While at Middlesbrough he did, however, win the League Cup in the 2003–04 season, coincidentally against Bolton.

=== Leeds United ===
In June 2004, he signed for Championship side Leeds United on a free transfer, agreeing a three-year deal with the club. Ricketts failed to impress, failing to score in 25 league appearances, although he did manage a solitary goal in the League Cup against Swindon Town.

=== Loans to Stoke, Cardiff and Burnley ===
Ricketts then joined Stoke City on a month-long loan in February 2005, but also failed to impress there, and returned to Leeds. He made five more appearances, scoring once against Oldham Athletic, again in the League Cup. He was then loaned out to Cardiff, where he scored four goals in 11 appearances, before returning to Leeds. On 30 January 2006, he signed for Championship side Burnley in a loan deal that would keep him at Turf Moor until the end of the season. Despite scoring twice in his first three matches against Plymouth Argyle and Ipswich Town, he again failed to impress (he did not score again) and returned to Leeds after the season had finished.

=== Move to Southend ===
On 30 June 2006, Ricketts signed a two-year deal with Championship side Southend United with an option to extend for another year. A clause in the contract he signed stated that he was prohibited from playing against Leeds United. However, after only a couple of months into the new season, Southend released Ricketts on the basis that he was overweight and had put on weight since joining the club, questioning his level of fitness.

=== Preston and Oldham ===
After leaving Southend, Ricketts joined Preston North End, playing a handful of games for their first team. In March 2007 he scored the winner against Ipswich Town. However, Ricketts' fitness and his inability to break into the first team on a regular basis led to him being released by Preston on 8 May 2007, again leaving him without a club until being picked up by Oldham Athletic, for whom he signed until 2010. He scored two league goals during his time at Oldham, in victories over Swansea City and his former club Walsall.

=== Walsall loan ===
On 2 November 2007, he returned to his first club Walsall on a three-month loan from Oldham. He made his second debut for Walsall in a league match against Cheltenham Town on 3 November. On 31 January 2008, transfer deadline day, Ricketts had his contract cancelled by Oldham Athletic.

=== Return to Walsall ===
On 24 July 2008, Ricketts once again rejoined Walsall and scored nine goals in his third spell there. At the game against Southend United played at Roots Hall on 7 March 2009, Ricketts was sent off in the 14th minute when he attempted to punch Kevin Betsy. At the end of the season he was released.

=== Tranmere Rovers ===
On 14 August 2009, it was announced that Ricketts had signed a one-year deal with Tranmere Rovers (his 11th professional club). Ricketts stated playing for John Barnes was a major factor in his decision to join the club. He made his debut for the club as a substitute in a League Cup game against his former club Bolton Wanderers on 25 August. He scored his first goal for Tranmere in a 2–1 defeat at Exeter City on 19 September 2009. On 21 January 2010, Ricketts had cancelled his contract by mutual consent.

== Personal life ==
On 17 January 2011, Ricketts pleaded guilty to a charge of common assault after punching and headbutting his ex-girlfriend. He was sentenced to a 12-month community order and fined £200 and ordered to pay £85 costs.

== Career statistics ==
=== Club ===
Appearances and goals by club, season and competition
| Club | Season | League | | | FA Cup | | League Cup | | Other^{[A]} | | Total | |
| Club | Season | Division | Apps | Goals | Apps | Goals | Apps | Goals | Apps | Goals | Apps | Goals |
|---|---|---|---|---|---|---|---|---|---|---|---|---|
| Walsall | 1995–96 | Second Division | 1 | 0 | 0 | 0 | 0 | 0 | 0 | 0 | 1 | 0 |
| Walsall | 1996–97 | Second Division | 11 | 1 | 0 | 0 | 1 | 0 | 0 | 0 | 12 | 1 |
| Walsall | 1997–98 | Second Division | 24 | 1 | 2 | 0 | 1 | 0 | 4 | 1 | 31 | 2 |
| Walsall | 1998–99 | Second Division | 8 | 0 | 0 | 0 | 1 | 0 | 0 | 0 | 9 | 0 |
| Walsall | 1999–2000 | First Division | 32 | 11 | 2 | 0 | 3 | 0 | 0 | 0 | 37 | 11 |
| Walsall | Total | | 76 | 14 | 4 | 0 | 6 | 0 | 4 | 1 | 90 | 15 |
| Bolton Wanderers | 2000–01 | First Division | 39 | 19 | 4 | 2 | 1 | 1 | 3 | 2 | 47 | 24 |
| Bolton Wanderers | 2001–02 | Premier League | 37 | 12 | 2 | 1 | 3 | 2 | 0 | 0 | 42 | 15 |
| Bolton Wanderers | 2002–03 | Premier League | 22 | 6 | 1 | 1 | 0 | 0 | 0 | 0 | 23 | 7 |
| Bolton Wanderers | Total | | 98 | 37 | 7 | 4 | 4 | 3 | 3 | 2 | 112 | 46 |
| Middlesbrough | 2002–03 | Premier League | 9 | 1 | 0 | 0 | 0 | 0 | 0 | 0 | 9 | 1 |
| Middlesbrough | 2003–04 | Premier League | 23 | 2 | 2 | 0 | 5 | 1 | 0 | 0 | 30 | 3 |
| Middlesbrough | Total | | 32 | 3 | 2 | 0 | 5 | 1 | 0 | 0 | 39 | 4 |
| Leeds United | 2004–05 | Championship | 21 | 0 | 0 | 0 | 3 | 1 | 0 | 0 | 24 | 1 |
| Leeds United | 2005–06 | Championship | 4 | 0 | 0 | 0 | 1 | 1 | 0 | 0 | 5 | 1 |
| Leeds United | Total | | 25 | 0 | 0 | 0 | 4 | 2 | 0 | 0 | 29 | 2 |
| Stoke City (loan) | 2004–05 | Championship | 11 | 0 | 0 | 0 | 0 | 0 | 0 | 0 | 11 | 0 |
| Cardiff City (loan) | 2005–06 | Championship | 17 | 5 | 0 | 0 | 0 | 0 | 0 | 0 | 17 | 5 |
| Burnley (loan) | 2005–06 | Championship | 13 | 2 | 0 | 0 | 0 | 0 | 0 | 0 | 13 | 2 |
| Southend United | 2006–07 | Championship | 2 | 0 | 0 | 0 | 0 | 0 | 0 | 0 | 2 | 0 |
| Preston North End | 2006–07 | Championship | 14 | 1 | 2 | 0 | 0 | 0 | 0 | 0 | 16 | 1 |
| Oldham Athletic | 2007–08 | League One | 9 | 2 | 1 | 0 | 2 | 0 | 1 | 0 | 13 | 2 |
| Walsall | 2007–08 | League One | 12 | 3 | 4 | 2 | 0 | 0 | 0 | 0 | 16 | 5 |
| Walsall | 2008–09 | League One | 28 | 9 | 1 | 1 | 1 | 1 | 2 | 1 | 32 | 12 |
| Walsall | Total | | 40 | 12 | 5 | 3 | 1 | 1 | 2 | 1 | 48 | 17 |
| Tranmere Rovers | 2009–10 | League One | 12 | 2 | 4 | 0 | 1 | 0 | 0 | 0 | 17 | 2 |
| Career total | | | 349 | 78 | 25 | 7 | 23 | 7 | 9 | 4 | 406 | 96 |

A. The "Other" column constitutes appearances and goals in the Football League play-offs, Football League Trophy.

=== International ===
| National team | Year | Apps | Goals |
|---|---|---|---|
| England | 2002 | 1 | 0 |
| Total | | 1 | 0 |

== Honours ==
Bolton Wanderers

- Football League First Division play-offs: 2001

Middlesbrough

- Football League Cup: 2003–04
