= 1987–88 Carlisle United F.C. season =

Carlisle United F.C.
1987–88 season
- Manager: Harry Gregg (to November); Clive Middlemass (from 23 November)
- Stadium: Brunton Park
- Fourth Division: 23rd
- FA Cup: First round
- League Cup: Second round
- Football League Trophy: First round

For the 1987–88 season, Carlisle United F.C. competed in Football League Division Four.

== Results & fixtures ==
=== Football League Fourth Division ===
==== League table ====
Pos	Team	Pld	W	D	L	GF	GA	GD	Pts	Promotion or relegation
20	Stockport County	46	12	15	19	44	58	−14	51	
21	Rochdale	46	11	15	20	47	76	−29	48	
22	Exeter City	46	11	13	22	53	68	−15	46	
23	Carlisle United	46	12	8	26	57	86	−29	44	
24	Newport County	46	6	7	33	35	105	−70	25	Automatically relegated to the Football Conference

==== Matches ====
Match Day	Date	Opponent	H/A	Score	Carlisle United Scorer(s)	Attendance
1	15 August	Peterborough United	A	0–1		
2	22 August	Scunthorpe United	H	3–1		
3	29 August	Burnley	A	3–4		
4	31 August	Hereford United	H	3–1		
5	4 September	Stockport County	A	0–3		
6	12 September	Hartlepool United	H	1–3		
7	16 September	Exeter City	A	1–1		
8	19 September	Cardiff City	A	2–4		
9	26 September	Scarborough	H	4–0		
10	29 September	Darlington	H	3–3		
11	3 October	Rochdale	A	2–1		
12	10 October	Wolverhampton Wanderers	H	0–1		
13	17 October	Bolton Wanderers	A	0–5		
14	20 October	Colchester United	A	0–1		
15	24 October	Tranmere Rovers	H	3–2		
16	31 October	Crewe Alexandra	A	1–4		
17	3 November	Leyton Orient	H	1–2		
18	7 November	Newport County	H	3–1		
19	21 November	Wrexham	A	0–4		
20	28 November	Torquay United	H	3–3		
21	12 December	Swansea City	A	1–3		
22	18 December	Cambridge United	H	2–1		
23	26 December	Scarborough	A	1–3		
24	1 January	Burnley	H	3–4		
25	2 January	Hartlepool United	A	0–0		
26	9 January	Darlington	A	1–2		
27	16 January	Cardiff City	H	0–0		
28	23 January	Exeter City	H	0–0		
29	30 January	Hereford United	A	0–2		
30	6 February	Stockport County	H	2–0		
31	20 February	Peterborough United	H	0–2		
32	27 February	Rochdale	H	2–0		
33	5 March	Bolton Wanderers	H	0–2		
34	12 March	Wolverhampton Wanderers	A	1–3		
35	19 March	Crewe Alexandra	H	0–1		
36	25 March	Tranmere Rovers	A	0–3		
37	2 April	Newport County	A	2–1		
38	4 April	Wrexham	H	0–4		
39	9 April	Leyton Orient	A	1–4		
40	12 April	Scunthorpe United	A	0–1		
41	19 April	Halifax Town	H	1–1		
42	23 April	Colchester United	H	4–0		
43	26 April	Halifax Town	A	1–1		
44	30 April	Torquay United	A	0–1		
45	2 May	Swansea City	H	0–1		
46	7 May	Cambridge United	A	2–1		

=== Football League Cup ===
Round	Date	Opponent	H/A	Score	Carlisle United Scorer(s)	Attendance
R1 L1	18 August	Stockport County	A	1–0		1,476
R1 L2	25 August	Stockport County	H	3–0		2,174
R2 L1	22 September	Oldham Athletic	H	4–3		1,476
R2 L2	6 October	Oldham Athletic	A	1–4		4,353

=== FA Cup ===
Round	Date	Opponent	H/A	Score	Carlisle United Scorer(s)	Attendance
R1	14 November	Macclesfield Town	A	2–4		2,385

=== Football League Trophy ===
Round	Date	Opponent	H/A	Score	Carlisle United Scorer(s)	Attendance
GS	13 October	Chester City	H	2–1		1,418
GS	24 November	Blackpool	A	1–0		1,491
R1	3 February	Hartlepool United	H	0–2		1,433
