= John Gope-Fenepej =

New Caledonian footballer (born 1978)

Personal information
- Date of birth: 6 November 1978 (age 47)
- Place of birth: Nouméa, New Caledonia
- Height: 1.85 m (6 ft 1 in)
- Position: Defender

Youth career
- –1998: Nantes

Senior career*
Years	Team	Apps	(Gls)
1998–2002	Nantes B	0	(0)
2000	→ Bolton Wanderers (loan)	2	(0)
2001–2002	→ Créteil (loan)	12	(0)
2002–2009	Orvault SF		
- * Club domestic league appearances and goals

John Gope-Fenepej (born 6 November 1978) is a New Caledonian former professional footballer who played as a defender. He is the brother of New Caledonian international footballer Georges Gope-Fenepej.

== Career ==
Gope-Fenepej played for Nantes B before briefly joining Bolton Wanderers on loan, under Sam Allardyce. He later moved on loan to Créteil. In 2002, he left Nantes for Orvault SF, and retired in 2009, at only 31.
