= Steve Harrison (footballer) =

English footballer, coach, and manager

Personal information
- Full name: Steven John Harrison
- Date of birth: 26 December 1952 (age 73)
- Place of birth: Blackpool, England
- Height: 5 ft 7 in (1.70 m)
- Position: Full-back

Senior career*
Years	Team	Apps	(Gls)
1971–1978	Blackpool	146	(2)
1978	Vancouver Whitecaps	24	(0)
1978–1981	Watford	83	(0)
1981–1982	Charlton Athletic	3	(0)

Managerial career
- 1988–1990: Watford
- 2010: Coventry City (caretaker)
- 2011: Coventry City (caretaker)
- * Club domestic league appearances and goals

Steven John Harrison (born 26 December 1952) is an English former professional footballer, manager and coach.

As a player, he played as a full-back for Blackpool (his hometown club), Vancouver Whitecaps, Watford and Charlton Athletic. Following his retirement, as a manager and coach he worked at Watford, Millwall, Crystal Palace, Wolverhampton Wanderers, Preston North End and Aston Villa, as well as working with the England national football team under Graham Taylor.

He moved to Middlesbrough in 2001 following the appointment of Steve McClaren and in 2003 he was appointed as the team's defensive coach. Harrison took on a more general role after Gareth Southgate took over, but left the club in July 2008 after suffering health problems in recent years. He has since recovered from his health problems and on 22 May 2009 he took up the role of assistant to Chris Coleman at Coventry City. On 4 May 2010 Harrison was named caretaker manager of the club after Coleman was sacked, returning to his role as assistant manager on 20 May with the appointment of Aidy Boothroyd as manager. On 14 March 2011 he was again appointed caretaker manager, following Boothroyd's sacking. In June 2012 Harrison parted company with the Sky Blues as a result of the strict cost-cutting measures implemented by the club's owners.
