= Michael Johansen =

Danish footballer (born 1972)

Personal information
- Full name: Michael Bro Johansen
- Date of birth: 22 July 1972 (age 54)
- Place of birth: Glostrup, Denmark
- Height: 1.68 m (5 ft 6 in)
- Position: Attacking midfielder

Youth career
- 1976–19??: Rosenhøj BK
- 19??–1990: Kjøbenhavns Boldklub

Senior career*
Years	Team	Apps	(Gls)
1990–1991	Kjøbenhavns Boldklub	15	(1)
1991–1992	B 1903	26	(1)
1992–1996	FC Copenhagen	114	(17)
1996–2000	Bolton Wanderers	137	(16)
2000–2004	AB Copenhagen	96	(13)
2004–2007	Greve IF		
Total		388+	(48+)

International career
2000–2002	Denmark	2	(0)
- * Club domestic league appearances and goals

Michael Bro Johansen (born 22 July 1972) is a Danish former professional football player who played as a midfielder in the Danish Superliga for FC Copenhagen and for English club Bolton Wanderers. He played two games for the Danish national team in 2000 and 2002, and was an unused substitute at the 1992 Summer Olympics. He is the older twin brother of former footballer Martin Johansen, and played alongside him in several clubs.

== Biography ==
Born in Glostrup, both Michael and Martin Johansen started playing for local Copenhagen club Rosenhøj IF at the age of four. They both went on to play for Kjøbenhavns Boldklub where they made their senior debut in the second-best Danish division in 1990. They moved to Danish Superliga club B 1903 in 1991 before they signed for FC Copenhagen upon the founding of that club in 1992. They helped the club win the Danish Superliga title in its first year of existence, and in 1996 the twins parted ways as Michael Johansen moved to the English First Division to join Bolton Wanderers. Signed for £1.250.000, he became a star at Bolton, earning the nickname "Smurf", and helped the club earn promotion to the Premier League for the 1997–98 season. Bolton's stint in the Premiership only lasted a year, before the club was once again relegated to the First Division. He also helped Bolton to the FA Cup semi final in 2000, but he was one of two Bolton players to have their penalty saved by Aston Villa goalkeeper David James as they crashed out in a penalty shootout. In all, Johansen played 137 matches and scored 16 goals for Bolton.

In June 2000, he returned to Denmark to play for Superliga bronze winners AB Copenhagen. As Morten Olsen became Danish national team coach in 2000, he called Johansen up for his national team debut in August 2000, in a 2–0 win against the Faroe Islands. In November 2002, Johansen won his second and last cap for Denmark, in a 2–0 win against Poland. As AB was relegated following the Danish Superliga 2003-04 season, Michael moved to amateur club Greve IF where he was reunited with Martin Johansen. Michael Johansen is now a FIFA-licensed player agent.

== Honours ==
Copenhagen

- Danish Cup: 1994–95
- Danish Super Cup: 1995

Bolton Wanderers

- Football League First Division: 1996–97
