= Guðni Bergsson =

Icelandic footballer and executive

9th Chairman of KSÍ
- In office 2017–2021
- Preceded by: Geir Þorsteinsson
- Succeeded by: Vanda Sigurgeirsdóttir

Personal details
- Born: 21 July 1965 (age 61) Reykjavík, Iceland
Association football career
- Height: 6 ft 1 in (1.85 m)
- Position: Defender
Senior career*
Years	Team	Apps	(Gls)
1983–1988	Valur	94	(7)
1986–1987	→ 1860 Munich (loan)	3	(0)
1988–1994	Tottenham Hotspur	71	(2)
1994	→ Valur (loan)	15	(0)
1995–2003	Bolton Wanderers	270	(23)
Total		453	(32)
International career
1984–2003	Iceland	80	(1)
- * Club domestic league appearances and goals

Guðni Bergsson (born 21 July 1965) is an Icelandic former professional footballer and former president of the Icelandic Football Association from 2017 to 2021.

As a player, he was a defender who notably played in the Premier League for Tottenham Hotspur and Bolton Wanderers. He also played for Valur and 1860 Munich. He was capped 80 times by Iceland, scoring 1 goal.

== Club career ==
Born in Reykjavík, Guðni started life in football with his local club Valur but soon harboured ambitions to play overseas. In 1985, he had a trial with English team Aston Villa but they did not follow up their initial interest.

=== Tottenham Hotspur ===
In December 1988, he was to return to England with Tottenham Hotspur, as then manager Terry Venables paid a fee of around £100,000 to Valur, a fee which was then a record sale for the Icelandic club who have since gone on to produce many other top Icelandic exports.

At Spurs, the central defender or full back teamed up with England internationals Paul Gascoigne, Gary Mabbutt, Gary Lineker and Chris Waddle. Understandably, he found it hard to make a regular breakthrough for the London club often filling in intermittently due to injuries or suspension. This did not stop him from becoming a regular for the Icelandic national team, where he eventually became captain winning in excess of 80 caps, which was a record for that country at the time.

He had his most successful spell at Spurs under the management of Venables, but he missed out on the FA Cup triumph of 1991. The appointment of Ossie Ardiles as the Tottenham manager effectively spelt the beginning of the end for Guðni, who feared a life away from football at one stage.

=== Bolton Wanderers ===
In 1995, after being told he could leave Spurs, Guðni began studying to become a lawyer. A trial game for Crystal Palace reserves alerted the then Bolton Wanderers manager Bruce Rioch to Guðni's availability. Rioch could not understand why such a seasoned international was struggling to find a new club. A fee of £65,000 was agreed between Bolton and Tottenham, rising to £110,000 dependent on a certain number of clauses.

Guðni made his Bolton debut in the most extreme surroundings of Wembley Stadium when coming on as a substitute for Scott Green in the 1995 Football League Cup Final defeat to Liverpool. England winger Steve McManaman had given Green a torrid time throughout the afternoon but Guðni's introduction gave Bolton renewed hope, as his first touch was to supply the cross for Alan Thompson to score. This was to be the start of a lifelong affection between Bolton Wanderers and Guðni.

On the eve of the 1995–96 season, he was promoted back to the Premiership with Bolton where he proved to be a cool and assured performer in an otherwise shaky Wandererer's defence. He scored a number of vital goals against Newcastle United, Leeds United and most notably on his return to White Hart Lane as Bolton drew 2–2 with Tottenham Hotspur. Unfortunately, that season ended in relegation for Bolton, but Guðni was eager to help the club bounce back at the first attempt. In 1996–97, the club finished the season as champions of the old Division One (now Championship), with Guðni chipping in with three vital league goals, two of which came in the 7–0 defeat of relegation-haunted Swindon Town.

During the 1997–98 season, the team relegated again, but this time the club showed much more of a fight than in their previous stint in the top league, only losing out to Everton on goal-difference on the final day. Bolton's loss at Chelsea coupled with Everton's draw against Coventry City meant that Guðni and Bolton were back in Division One. That season, Guðni scored one of the goals of the season; on 26 December 1997, Bolton played a home match against fellow strugglers Barnsley with both needing vital league points to climb away from trouble. Guðni equalised for the Trotters shortly before half time with a 35-yard shot from right-back which sailed into the top corner past the goalkeeper David Watson. The next season saw Guðni suffer a series of niggling injury problems and was one of his most frustrating seasons at Bolton. Players such as Mark Fish, Andy Todd, Jon Newsome and Paul Warhurst had all played in the heart of the defence in his absence, rumours even circulated that he may leave but this was soon dispelled.

The following 1999–2000 season saw Bolton and Guðni reach three domestic Semi-Final competitions, losing all of them. First, the club lost out to Tranmere Rovers in a two-legged League Cup semi-final, then were defeated by Premiership side Aston Villa on penalties in a hard-fought encounter at Wembley in a game which Guðni picked up a hamstring injury. Finally they faced Ipswich Town in the Divisional Play-offs in May 2000. Both sides had drawn 2–2 in the first leg at the Reebok Stadium, this making for an excellent second leg in the return at Portman Road. The game was marred by 12 Bolton bookings, the sending off of Robbie Elliott and Mike Whitlow and three debatable Ipswich penalties. Bolton criticised the highly controversial performance of referee Barry Knight claiming that the Orpington official had given Ipswich an unfair advantage. Ipswich later won the game 5–3 after extra-time and it looked as if Guðni would be retiring from football at the age of 35.

However, new Wanderers manager Sam Allardyce persuaded the ever reliable Guðni to sign up for another year and he did not disappoint as he scored 10 goals from defence, putting in a string of excellent performances alongside the likes of Whitlow and Colin Hendry, as Bolton ultimately returned to the Premiership following a 3–0 play off win over Preston North End at the Millennium Stadium in Cardiff.

With rumours again circulating of Guðni's imminent retirement Allardyce talked him into staying for one last season. This proved to be a rocky season for Bolton, only staying up on the last day with a 2–1 victory against Middlesbrough at the Reebok Stadium. Guðni almost scored against former club Tottenham in a game in March 2003 but his header rebounded back off the post.

== International career ==
Guðni made his debut for Iceland in 1984 and went on to earn 80 caps, scoring 1 goal. His last international came in June 2003 against Lithuania. He is number four in Iceland's all-time international appearances list, behind record-holder Rúnar Kristinsson, Hermann Hreiðarsson and Eiður Guðjohnsen.

== Post-football ==
Following his retirement from playing, Guðni became the presenter of the football TV-shows Boltinn með Guðna Bergs (English: The ball with Guðni Bergs) and 4-4-2 while also working as a lawyer.

On 8 August 2009, Guðni played in a Bolton Legends vs Bolton Legends match that took place before Jussi Jääskeläinen's testimonial. The Legends match finished 0–0.

On 6 March 2012, a man attacked his fellow lawyer, Skúli Eggert Sigurz, at their firm with a hunting knife. Whilst subduing the attacker, Guðni was stabbed twice in the leg. He was later released from hospital, however his colleague remained in a critical condition. On 26 June 2012, the attacker was sentenced to 14 years in prison. Gudni received 800.000 ISK in compensation.

On 11 February 2017, Guðni was elected chairman of the Icelandic Football Association. He resigned on 29 August 2021 following the 2021 Icelandic FA sex scandals.

On 14 November 2021, Guðni played in a charity match as part of a team of Bolton Wanderers Legends against the current Bolton first team with the match helping to raise money for the mother of Bolton player Gethin Jones, who had been diagnosed with Motor neuron disease. The Bolton first team won 7–4. Guðni was substituted off after eight minutes having picked up an injury.

== Honours ==
Tottenham Hotspur

- FA Charity Shield: 1991 (shared)

Bolton Wanderers

- Football League First Division: 1996–97; play-offs: 1995, 2001
- Football League Cup runner-up: 1994–95
