= Bo Hansen =

Danish footballer (born 1972)

Personal information
- Date of birth: 16 June 1972 (age 54)
- Place of birth: Holstebro, Denmark
- Height: 1.85 m (6 ft 1 in)
- Position: Striker

Senior career*
Years	Team	Apps	(Gls)
1990–1994	Holstebro Boldklub		
1994–1999	Brøndby	102	(43)
1999–2002	Bolton Wanderers	96	(15)
2002–2004	Midtjylland	39	(3)
Total		237	(61)

International career
1995	Denmark	1	(0)
- * Club domestic league appearances and goals

Bo Hansen (born 16 June 1972) is a Danish former football player in the striker position. He scored 52 goals in 143 games for Danish club Brøndby IF and 16 goals in 119 games for English club Bolton Wanderers. Hansen played one game for the Denmark national football team.

== Biography ==
Hansen started his career with Holstebro Boldklub in the Danish 1st Division. In July 1991, defending Danish champions Brøndby IF were reported to be interested in signing him. Hansen chose to finish his education, and played a further three years for Holstebro, amassing more than 140 games for the club. Hansen signed a part-time contract with Brøndby in July 1994, in order to use his education besides playing football.

Despite only playing part-time, he quickly impressed for Brøndby in the top-flight Danish Superliga championship, scoring three goals in his first four league games. He formed a striker duo with Danish international Mark Strudal, and Hansen was called up for the Danish national team in January 1995. He was a part of the Danish squad for the 1995 King Fahd Cup, and played a single game as Denmark won the tournament, when he replaced Mark Strudal at halftime during the 2–0 victory against Saudi Arabia. This was to be his only national team game.

Hansen was Brøndby's second best goalscorer of the 1994–95 Superliga season, scoring one goal fewer than Strudal. For the 1995–96 Superliga season, contention for the striker positions in the Brøndby starting line-up was intensified. Danish international Peter Møller arrived from Aalborg BK, and later Danish national team captain Ebbe Sand also emerged as a goalscorer. Hansen was a part of the Brøndby team which won three Superliga championships in a row from 1996 to 1998, though he was not among Brøndby's topscoring strikers until the 1997–98 Superliga season, when Peter Møller had been sold to PSV Eindhoven. He started the 1998–99 Superliga season well, and was Brøndby's top goalscorer with 12 goals after the first half of the season.

At the winter break, Hansen signed a transfer deal with Bolton Wanderers in the secondary Football League First Division, worth £1 million. At Bolton, he joined up with fellow Danish players Per Frandsen, Claus Jensen and Michael Johansen. In his first year at Bolton, Hansen did not score any goals, as the club narrowly missed promotion for the top-flight FA Premier League championship. He scored his first Bolton goal in a September 1999 Football League Cup game against Gillingham. In his second season, Bolton were once again close to promotion, before finally reaching the Premier League in 2001. Hansen scored one goal in 17 Premier League games, as Bolton finished in 16th place, and avoided relegation.

He moved back Denmark in the summer 2002, when he joined Superliga club FC Midtjylland (FCM) as a replacement for striker Morten Skoubo. In the fall 2003, Hansen suffered an injury due to osteoarthritis in his knees. He never returned to the pitch and was released by FCM in September 2004.

== Honours ==
Bolton Wanderers

- Football League First Division play-offs: 2001
