= Robbie Elliott =

English footballer (born 1973)

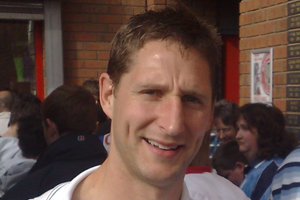
- Elliott in 2008

Personal information
- Full name: Robert James Elliott
- Date of birth: 25 December 1973 (age 52)
- Place of birth: Gosforth, Northumberland, England
- Height: 5 ft 10 in (1.78 m)
- Position: Left-back

Team information
- Current team: USA U20 (strength coach)

Youth career
- 1989–1991: Newcastle United

Senior career*
Years	Team	Apps	(Gls)
1991–1997	Newcastle United	79	(9)
1997–2001	Bolton Wanderers	86	(5)
2001–2006	Newcastle United	63	(2)
2006–2007	Sunderland	7	(0)
2007	Leeds United	7	(0)
2007–2008	Hartlepool United	15	(0)
Total		257	(16)
- * Club domestic league appearances and goals

Robert James Elliott (born 25 December 1973) is an English football coach and former professional player, who is the strength coach for the United States U20 men's football team.

As a player, he was a left-back and centre-half who notably played in the Premier League for Newcastle United and Bolton Wanderers, as well as in the Football League for Sunderland, Leeds United and Hartlepool United. With the Magpies during his first spell he was part of the side who won the First Division title in 1993, and who finished runners-up in two consecutive Premiership seasons.

Following retirement, Elliott returned for a third spell with Newcastle as a fitness coach but later moving to work for the United States Soccer Federation.

== Playing career ==
=== Newcastle United ===
Elliott began his career with his hometown club in 1989 as a youth trainee and offered a professional contract just two years later. He was one of a number of youngsters who had been blooded by the Magpies for first team action by Ossie Ardiles in 1991–92, others included Steve Watson, Steve Howey, Alan Thompson and Lee Clark. He had made his debut the previous season, in a 3–0 league defeat by Middlesbrough at Ayresome Park on 12 March 1991.

He found opportunities hard to come by in his early years at Newcastle, this mainly being due to the form of regular left-back and crowd favourite John Beresford, a signing from Portsmouth in 1992. However, he was still very much considered to be a key part of the first team squad and one to develop by the manager at the time Kevin Keegan. In the season of 1993–94, he was capped by the England U21 team along with fellow Geordie Lee Clark, whilst also making a total of 15 appearances in the Premier League, his first in the top flight.

1994–95 saw him score his first ever Newcastle goal as a substitute in the opening day fixture against top-flight new boys Leicester City at Filbert Street. He was also on the mark in the home against Leeds United towards the latter end of that season, a season which he temporarily became the club's first choice left-back in the final few months. It looked as if he would be out of the exit door at Newcastle in 1995–96 as he made just six league appearances. Blackburn Rovers showed strong interest in signing him but he remained with the Black and White stripes in order to fight for a first team place.

In contrast 1996–97 was probably his best ever season in a Newcastle jersey, he scored seven goals as the Magpies finished as the runners-up to eventual champions Manchester United, a club whom Elliott had previously trialled with as a schoolboy. The most memorable of his seven goals was the winner in a 1–0 win against Arsenal at Highbury.

=== Bolton Wanderers ===
Keegan's managerial departure from Newcastle also yielded the end of Elliott's first spell with his boyhood club. New manager Kenny Dalglish accepted a bid of around £2.5 million for Elliott from Division One champions Bolton Wanderers in July 1997, becoming their record signing at the time. Bolton had, at the time, moved to the new 25,000 all-seater Reebok Stadium arena and this looked to be a new start for Elliott as he faced the prospect of more regular first team football alongside his former Newcastle teammates Alan Thompson, Peter Beardsley and Scott Sellars, all of whom were also on Bolton's books at that time.

However disaster struck in the first ever match at the Reebok Stadium against Everton, just 30 minutes into the game Elliott landed awkwardly following a challenge by Toffees full back Tony Thomas and was stretchered off with a double fracture to his leg. Understandably Elliott was to miss the rest of that season and part of the next season, in a cruel twist of fate. Bolton had been relegated from the Premiership in his absence following an end of season drama at Chelsea.

In October 1998, Elliott's luck was to change for the better, he was named in midfield for Bolton's League Cup clash away to Norwich City for his first game since that fateful first night at the Reebok Stadium. He managed to get on the scoresheet at Carrow Road as Bolton advanced to the next round of the competition and later played in a handful of league matches thereafter to boost his fitness levels further.

The end of that season saw Bolton qualify for the divisions Play-offs, and they advanced to the final after a tricky semi-final against Ipswich Town over two legs. Elliott was to play at Wembley Stadium with Bolton in the final against Watford, but the club lost the game by two goals to nil. A year later Elliott reached three semi-finals with Bolton, who were now managed by Sam Allardyce. However, on each occasion these ended in defeat, with the Play Off match against Ipswich proving difficult for Elliott as he was sent off for throwing Ipswich forward David Johnson to the ground in what was a highly charged game against the Suffolk club.

Throughout his career at Bolton he was often touted for a possible return to the Premiership with other clubs because he was one of the club's highest paid and most experienced players. However, to his credit, he wanted to help Bolton back into the Premier League, and in his final season he did just that as the club won the 2001 Play Off Final against Preston North End at the Millennium Stadium in Cardiff having finished behind the other two promoted teams Fulham and Blackburn Rovers.

=== Return to Newcastle United ===
Just two days after that play-off success his contract expired with Bolton and he completed a dream return to Newcastle on a Bosman transfer.

Initially, Elliott was used as a backup player in Newcastle's squad for the 2001–02 season, however he then went on to have limited chances in the 2002–03 season and then failed to make any first team appearances at all during the 2003–04 season. However, by the 2004–05 season, injuries to the squad merited Elliott a recall to the first team football, he went on the make 17 appearances that season and scored one goal against Manchester City. For season 2005/06 he remained in Newcastle's first team squad albeit not as a first choice. With injuries occurring, he played numerous games in central defence and at left back but the younger academy graduate Peter Ramage was often preferred over Elliott's experience as the season progressed. He was released in the following summer.

=== Sunderland ===
Following his release, Elliott trained with Newcastle's rivals Sunderland following an unsuccessful trial with Leeds United. With Sunderland short on left backs, Elliott signed a one-month contract prior to the start of the 06/07 Football League Championship season, and made his debut in the 3–1 defeat to Southend United at Roots Hall on 19 August 2006. In a match against Stoke City in 2006 he broke the leg of Rory Delap who at the time was on loan at Stoke from Sunderland.

=== Leeds United ===
After an unsuccessful spell at the Stadium of Light, Elliott was transferred to Leeds United, who originally rejected his services six months previously. Elliott confirmed after his Leeds debut in the 2–1 victory over Coventry City on 1 January 2007 that his transfer was permanent, not a loan and his contract with the club was to expire at the end of the season, in May 2007. Elliot was released from Leeds at the end of the 2006–07 season having only made 7 appearances for the club.

=== Hartlepool United ===
After leaving Leeds, Elliott joined Hartlepool United in July 2007. Elliott was sent off against Doncaster Rovers on 18 August 2007 on his home debut for two yellow cards by referee Mike Dean.

== Coaching career ==
In July 2008, Elliott went back to Newcastle for his third spell at the club and become the new assistant Fitness and Conditioning coach for the club to work under senior fitness coach Mark Hulse.

In June 2009, Elliott left Newcastle United due to the turmoil regarding the take over of the club.

Since 2009, Elliott has worked with the US Soccer Federation in the position of Youth National Team Performance Expert (Male and Female).

== Personal life ==
Elliott, with his friend Phil Gray, have raised funds for the Sir Bobby Robson Foundation. In 2012 Elliott, along with Joey Barton, a former Newcastle United midfielder, sponsored a shirt each from Newcastle United's women's team. Elliot sponsored the number three shirt, the number he wore in the men's side.

== Honours ==
Bolton Wanderers

- Football League First Division play-offs: 2001
