= Mike Whitlow =

English footballer (born 1968)

Personal information
- Full name: Michael William Whitlow
- Date of birth: 13 January 1968 (age 58)
- Place of birth: Northwich, England
- Position: Defender

Team information
- Current team: Mansfield Town (under-18s coach)

Youth career
- 1985–1986: Bolton Wanderers

Senior career*
Years	Team	Apps	(Gls)
1987–1988	Witton Albion	?	(?)
1988–1992	Leeds United	77	(4)
1992–1997	Leicester City	147	(8)
1997–2003	Bolton Wanderers	132	(2)
2003–2004	Sheffield United	17	(1)
2004–2007	Notts County	24	(0)
Total		397	(15)

Managerial career
- 2014: Burton Albion (caretaker)
- * Club domestic league appearances and goals

Michael William Whitlow (born 13 January 1968) is an English former professional footballer and Under-18s coach at League Two club Mansfield Town.

As a player, he was a defender from 1987 to 2007. He notably played for Leeds United, and in the Premier League for Leicester City and Bolton Wanderers, and in the Football League for Sheffield United and Notts County.

He has since coached at various clubs across both youth academies and first teams including Derby County, Burton Albion and Birmingham City.

== Playing career ==
As a player, Whitlow was primarily used as left-back. He began his professional career at Leeds United, whom he joined from non-league Witton Albion in November 1988. He spent four seasons at Leeds and played slightly less than 100 games for the team. In March 1992, Whitlow was sold to Leicester City for a £250,000 transfer fee. Leeds went on to win the old First Division a few months later which Whitlow had contributed to with ten league appearances and a goal against rivals Sheffield Wednesday. Despite making enough appearances to earn a medal, he did not receive one at the time as he already left for Leicester by the time Leeds had been confirmed as champions. Ten years on, he received a letter from the Professional Footballers' Association informing him that he would belatedly receive the medal he was entitled to.

At Leicester, Whitlow became a first-team regular and was a member of the side that won the 1997 League Cup. In total, he played 180 games for the Foxes and scored nine goals. He then moved on to Bolton Wanderers in September 1997 for a £500,000 fee. At Bolton, Whitlow is remembered for being sent off in the dramatic 2000 playoff semi-final against Ipswich Town that Ipswich went on to win 5-3 after extra time, following a Jim Magilton equaliser in the last minute of normal time. The following season, Whitlow missed most of the action because of injury, but he returned to the side just in time for the playoffs, where Bolton this time got promoted to the Premier League.

After six seasons at Bolton, with 163 first-team appearances to his name, Whitlow was released at the end of the 2002-03 season. He spent the 2003-04 season at Sheffield United, scoring once against Burnley, and then joined Notts County the following season as player-coach. His last competitive match for County came in March 2005, although he remained registered as a player at the club until 2007.

== Coaching career ==
After leaving Notts County, Whitlow worked for Derby County's academy, before being appointed head of youth development at Mansfield Town in May 2009, following the departure of David Jervis., he stayed in this job for just over a year before joining Burton Albion in a similar capacity.

In 2014 Whitlow was appointed caretaker manager at Burton Albion after manager Gary Rowett and his coaching staff left the club to join Birmingham City. Whitlow's first game in charge was 1–1 home draw with Plymouth Argyle on 1 November 2014. Whitlow returned to his original role at the club following the appointment of Jimmy Floyd Hasselbaink as manager. In the summer of 2016, he returned to Mansfield Town's academy as coach of their under-18s.

== Honours ==
Leeds United

- Football League First Division: 1991–92
- Football League Second Division: 1989–90

Leicester City

- Football League First Division play-offs: 1994, 1996
- Football League Cup: 1996–97

Bolton Wanderers

- Football League First Division play-offs: 2001
