= 1992–93 Bolton Wanderers F.C. season =

Bolton Wanderers
1992–93 season
- Chairman: Gordon Hargreaves
- Manager: Bruce Rioch
- Stadium: Burnden Park
- Second Division: 2nd
- FA Cup: Fifth round
- League Cup: Second round
- Associate Members Cup: Northern Quarter-final
- Top goalscorer: League: Andy Walker (26); All: Andy Walker (33)
- Highest home attendance: 21,720 (vs. Preston North End, 8 May 1993
- Lowest home attendance: 3,278 (vs. Bury, 8 December 1992

The 1992–1993 season was the 114th season in Bolton Wanderers F.C.'s existence, and their fifth successive season in the third tier of English Football, now renamed the Football League Second Division after the formation of the FA Premier League. This article covers the period from 1 July 1992 to 30 June 1993.

== Playing Squad ==
Note: Flags indicate national team as defined under FIFA eligibility rules; some limited exceptions apply. Players may hold more than one non-FIFA nationality.

Pos.	Nation	Player
GK	IRL	Keith Branagan
GK	WAL	David Felgate
DF	ENG	Phil Brown
DF	ENG	Mark Seagraves
DF	ENG	Alan Stubbs
DF	ENG	David Burke
DF	ENG	Scott Green
DF	ENG	Gary Parkinson
DF	ENG	Nicky Spooner
DF	ENG	Mark Winstanley
DF	ENG	Jason Lydiate
DF	ENG	Mark Came

Pos.	Nation	Player
DF	ENG	Stuart Storer
MF	ENG	David Lee
MF	ENG	Tony Kelly
MF	IRL	Jason McAteer
MF	ENG	Julian Darby
MF	ENG	Neil Fisher
MF	ENG	Andy Roscoe
FW	SCO	John McGinlay
FW	ENG	Mark Patterson
FW	SCO	Andy Walker
FW	ENG	Tony Philliskirk
FW	ENG	David Reeves

== Results ==
=== Barclays League Division Two ===
Date	Opponents	H / A	Result F–A	Scorers	Attendance
15 August 1992	Huddersfield Town	H	2–0	Darby, Walker	7,897
22 August 1992	Brighton	A	1–2	Walker	6,205
29 August 1992	Reading	H	2–1	Seagraves, Walker	4,877
1 September 1992	Blackpool	H	3–0	Green, Walker, Philliskirk	7,291
5 September 1992	Stoke City	A	0–0		14,252
12 September 1992	Rotherham United	A	1–2	Brown	5,227
15 September 1992	West Bromwich Albion	H	0–2		8,531
19 September 1992	Bournemouth	H	1–1	Philliskirk	4,623
26 September 1992	Plymouth Argyle	A	1–2	Darby	6,829
3 October 1992	Leyton Orient	A	0–1		3,946
10 October 1992	Hartlepool United	H	1–2	Green	5,097
17 October 1992	Chester City	A	2–2	McGinlay, Reeves	3,394
24 October 1992	Hull City	H	2–0	McGinlay, Patterson	4,136
31 October 1992	Preston North End	A	2–2	Green, Stubbs	7,013
3 November 1992	Exeter City	A	3–1	Spooner, Walker (2)	2,431
7 November 1992	Port Vale	H	1–1	McGinlay	7,349
21 November 1992	Fulham	A	4–1	Lee, Stubbs, Walker (2)	4,049
28 November 1992	Burnley	H	4–0	Brown, Lee, Walker (2)	11,438
19 December 1992	Bradford City	H	5–0	Lee, Seagraves, Walker, McGinlay (2)	6,887
26 December 1992	Wigan Athletic	H	2–1	Walker (2)	11,493
28 December 1992	Swansea	A	2–1	Brown, McGinlay	7,220
9 January 1993	West Bromwich Albion	A	1–3	Walker	14,581
16 January 1993	Plymouth Argyle	H	3–1	Seagraves, Walker, McGinlay	8,256
27 January 1993	Reading	A	2–1	Lee, Walker	4,640
30 January 1993	Brighton	H	0–1		8,929
6 February 1993	Huddersfield Town	A	1–1	Walker	8,858
9 February 1993	Stockport County	A	0–2		7,363
20 February 1993	Blackpool	A	1–1	McGinlay	8,054
27 February 1993	Hartlepool United	A	2–0	Green, McGinlay	2,756
6 March 1993	Leyton Orient	H	1–0	Walker	7,763
9 March 1993	Mansfield Town	H	2–1	Walker (2)	6,557
13 March 1993	Port Vale	A	0–0		11,055
20 March 1993	Exeter City	H	4–1	Kelly, McAteer, Walker, McGinlay	6,819
23 March 1993	Burnley	A	1–0	McGinlay	15,085
27 March 1993	Fulham	H	1–0	Walker	8,402
30 March 1993	Rotherham United	H	2–0	Walker (2)	7,985
3 April 1993	Mansfield Town	A	1–1	Seagraves	5,366
6 April 1993	Stockport County	H	2–1	Walker, McGinlay	13,773
10 April 1993	Wigan Athletic	A	2–0	Kelly, Walker	5,408
12 April 1993	Swansea City	H	3–1	Lee, Green (2)	10,854
17 April 1993	Bradford City	A	1–2	McGinlay	9,813
24 April 1993	Chester City	H	5–0	Brown, Seagraves, McGinlay, Patterson, Winstanley	8,514
27 April 1993	Bournemouth	A	2–1	Brown, Darby	4,434
30 April 1993	Hull City	A	2–1	Windass (og), McGinlay	8,785
4 May 1993	Stoke City	H	1–0	Darby	19,238
8 May 1993	Preston North End	H	1–0	McGinlay (pen)	21,720

Pos	Team	Pld	W	D	L	GF	GA	GD	Pts	Qualification or relegation
1	Stoke City (C, P)	46	27	12	7	73	34	+39	93	Promotion to the First Division
2	Bolton Wanderers (P)	46	27	9	10	80	41	+39	90	Promotion to the First Division
3	Port Vale	46	26	11	9	79	44	+35	89	Qualification for the Second Division play-offs
4	West Bromwich Albion (O, P)	46	25	10	11	88	54	+34	85	Qualification for the Second Division play-offs
5	Swansea City	46	20	13	13	65	47	+18	73	Qualification for the Second Division play-offs

Rules for classification: 1) Points; 2) Goals scored; 3) Goal difference
(C) Champions; (O) Play-off winners; (P) Promoted

=== FA Cup ===
Date	Round	Opponents	H / A	Result F–A	Scorers	Attendance
14 November 1992	Round 1	Sutton Coldfield Town	H	2–1	Walker, Reeves	5,345
5 December 1992	Round 2	Rochdale	H	4–0	McAteer 42', McGinlay 64', 69', Walker 76'	6,876
3 January 1993	Round 3	Liverpool	H	2–2	McGinlay 6', Seagraves 22'	21,502
13 January 1993	Round 3 replay	Liverpool	A	2–0	McGinlay 3', Walker 78'	34,790
24 January 1993	Round 4	Wolverhampton Wanderers	A	2–0	Green 11', McGinlay 24'	19,120
13 February 1993	Round 5	Derby County	A	1–3	Walker	20,289

=== Coca-Cola Cup ===
Date	Round	Opponents	H / A	Result F–A	Scorers	Attendance
18 August 1992	Round 1 First Leg	Port Vale	A	2–1	Green, Stubbs	3,282
25 August 1992	Round 1 Second Leg	Port Vale	H	1–1; 3–2 (agg)	Walker	4,870
22 September 1992	Round 2 First Leg	Wimbledon	H	1–3	Stubbs	5,049
6 October 1992	Round 2 Second Leg	Wimbledon	A	1–0; 2–3 (agg)	Philliskirk	1,987

=== Associate Members Cup ===
Date	Round	Opponents	H / A	Result F–A	Scorers	Attendance
1 December 1992	Group Stage Game One	Rochdale	A	0–0		1,348
8 December 1992	Group Stage Game Two	Bury	H	1–1	McGinlay	3,278
19 January 1993	Northern Section Round 2	Darlington	A	4–3	Lee, Kelly, Walker (2)	1,265
2 February 1993	Northern Section Quarter Final	Huddersfield Town	A	0–3		2,996

== Top scorers ==
P	Player	Position	FL	FAC	LC	AMC	Total
1	(Scotland) Andy Walker	Striker	26	4	1	2	33
2	(Scotland) John McGinlay	Striker	16	5	0	1	22
3	(England) Scott Green	Midfielder	6	1	1	0	8
4=	(England) David Lee	Midfielder	5	0	0	1	6
4=	(England) Mark Seagraves	Defender	5	1	0	0	6
