= 1991–92 Bolton Wanderers F.C. season =

Bolton Wanderers
1991–92 season
- Chairman: Gordon Hargreaves
- Manager: Phil Neal (until 8 May 1992); Bruce Rioch (from 29 May 1992)
- Stadium: Burnden Park
- Third Division: 13th
- FA Cup: 5th Round
- League Cup: 2nd Round
- Associate Members Cup: Northern Section 1st Round
- Top goalscorer: League: Andy Walker (15); All: Tony Philliskirk (19)
- Highest home attendance: 20,136 v Southampton; 16 February 1992
- Lowest home attendance: 1,507 v Rochdale; 10 December 1991
Home colours

The 1991–1992 season was the 113th season in Bolton Wanderers F.C.'s existence, and their fourth successive season in the Football League Third Division. It covers the period from 1 July 1991 to 30 June 1992.

== Results ==
=== Football League Division Three ===
| Date | Opponents | H / A | Result F–A | Scorers | Attendance |
|---|---|---|---|---|---|
| 17 August 1991 | Huddersfield Town | H | 1–1 | Philliskirk | 7,606 |
| 24 August 1991 | Swansea City | A | 1–1 | Reeves | 3,578 |
| 31 August 1991 | Leyton Orient | H | 1–0 | Reeves | 5,058 |
| 3 September 1991 | Darlington | A | 2–3 | Philliskirk, Reeves | 3,385 |
| 7 September 1991 | West Bromwich Albion | H | 3–0 | Philliskirk (2), M. Brown | 7,980 |
| 14 September 1991 | Bournemouth | A | 2–1 | Reeves, P. Brown | 5,690 |
| 17 September 1991 | Bradford City | A | 4–4 | Darby (2), Reeves, Patterson | 5,669 |
| 19 September 1991 | Bournemouth | H | 1–1 | Philliskirk | 4,623 |
| 21 September 1991 | Wigan Athletic | H | 1–1 | Darby | 6,9,23 |
| 28 September 1991 | Brentford | A | 2–3 | Reeves, Darby | 5,658 |
| 5 October 1991 | Torquay United | H | 1–0 | Green | 5,092 |
| 12 October 1991 | Stoke City | A | 0–2 | | 12,420 |
| 19 October 1991 | Fulham | H | 0–3 | | 5,152 |
| 26 October 1991 | Chester City | A | 1–0 | Darby | 1,867 |
| 2 November 1991 | Reading | H | 1–1 | Philliskirk | 3,632 |
| 5 November 1991 | Stockport County | A | 2–2 | Philliskirk (2) (1pen) | 5,036 |
| 9 November 1991 | Bury | A | 1– 1 | M. Brown | 5,886 |
| 23 November 1991 | Preston North End | H | 1–0 | Reeves | 7,033 |
| 30 November 1991 | Shrewsbury Town | A | 3–1 | Philliskirk (pen), Kelly, Reeves | 3,937 |
| 14 December 1991 | Hull City | H | 1–0 | Philliskirk (pen) | 5,273 |
| 26 December 1991 | Leyton Orient | A | 1–2 | Green | 4,896 |
| 28 December 1991 | Huddersfield Town | A | 0–1 | | 11,884 |
| 1 January 1992 | Darlington | H | 2–0 | Philliskirk, Fisher | 5,841 |
| 11 January 1992 | Exeter City | A | 2–2 | Philliskirk, Walker | 3,336 |
| 18 January 1992 | Hartlepool United | H | 2–2 | Walker, Darby | 6,129 |
| 1 February 1992 | Fulham | A | 1–1 | Walker | 3,814 |
| 8 February 1992 | Chester City | H | 0–0 | | 6,609 |
| 11 February 1992 | Shrewsbury Town | H | 1–0 | Walker | 5,276 |
| 22 February 1992 | Exeter City | H | 1–2 | Walker | 5,631 |
| 29 February 1992 | Peterborough United | A | 0–1 | | 6,270 |
| 3 March 1992 | Hartlepool United | A | 4–0 | Walker (2), Kelly, M. Brown | 2,244 |
| 10 March 1992 | Stockport County | H | 0–0 | | 7,635 |
| 14 March 1992 | Reading | A | 0–1 | | 3,515 |
| 17 March 1992 | Birmingham City | H | 1–1 | P. Brown | 7,329 |
| 21 March 1992 | Bury | H | 2–1 | Walker (2) | 7,619 |
| 24 March 1992 | Peterborough United | H | 2–1 | Walker, Charlery (og) | 5,421 |
| 28 March 1992 | Preston North End | A | 1–2 | Philliskirk | 7,327 |
| 31 March 1992 | Bournemouth | H | 0–2 | | 4,955 |
| 4 April 1992 | West Bromwich Albion | A | 2–2 | Walker, Stubbs | 10,287 |
| 7 April 1992 | Swansea City | H | 0–0 | | 3,535 |
| 11 April 1992 | Bradford City | H | 1–1 | Walker | 4,892 |
| 14 April 1992 | Birmingham City | H | 1–2 | Walker | 4,892 |
| 18 April 1992 | Wigan Athletic | A | 1–1 | Spooner | 3,357 |
| 20 April 1992 | Brentford | H | 1–2 | Walker | 4,382 |
| 25 April 1992 | Torquay United | A | 0–2 | | 2,178 |
| 29 April 1992 | Hull City | A | 0–2 | | 3,997 |
| 2 May 1992 | Stoke City | H | 3–1 | Patterson, Seagraves, Walker | 10,000 |

| Pos | Team | Pld | W | D | L | GF | GA | GD | Pts | Promotion or relegation |
|---|---|---|---|---|---|---|---|---|---|---|
| 11 | Hartlepool United | 46 | 18 | 11 | 17 | 57 | 57 | 0 | 65 | Qualification for the Second Division (Note: From the 1992–93 season, the second tier - then known as the Second Division - was renamed to the First Division, the third tier - then known as the Third Division - was renamed to the Second Division, and the fourth tier - then known as the Fourth Division - was renamed to the Third Division.) |
| 12 | Reading | 46 | 16 | 13 | 17 | 59 | 62 | −3 | 61 | Qualification for the Second Division |
| 13 | Bolton Wanderers | 46 | 14 | 17 | 15 | 57 | 56 | +1 | 59 | Qualification for the Second Division |
| 14 | Hull City | 46 | 16 | 11 | 19 | 54 | 54 | 0 | 59 | Qualification for the Second Division |
| 15 | Wigan Athletic | 46 | 15 | 14 | 17 | 58 | 64 | −6 | 59 | Qualification for the Second Division |

=== F.A. Cup ===
| Date | Round | Opponents | H / A | Result F–A | Scorers | Attendance |
|---|---|---|---|---|---|---|
| 17 November 1991 | Round 1 | Emley | A | 3–0 | Reeves (2), Philliskik | 9,035 |
| 7 December 1992 | Round 2 | Bradford City | H | 3–1 | Burke, Reeves, Philliskirk | 7,129 |
| 4 January 1992 | Round 3 | Reading | H | 2–0 | Philliskirk (2) | 7,301 |
| 25 January 1992 | Round 4 | Brighton | H | 2–1 | Walker 51', Philliskirk (pen) 71' | 12,635 |
| 16 February 1992 | Round 5 | Southampton | H | 2–2 | Walker 79', Green 87' | 20,136 |
| 26 February 1992 | Round 5 replay | Southampton | A | 2–3 (a.e.t.) | Walker 30', Darby 90' | 18,009 |

=== Rumbelows Cup ===
| Date | Round | Opponents | H / A | Result F–A | Scorers | Attendance |
|---|---|---|---|---|---|---|
| 20 August 1991 | Round 1 First Leg | York City | H | 2–2 | Philliskirk, Darby | 3,017 |
| 27 August 1991 | Round 1 Second Leg | York City | A | 2–1; 4–3 (agg) | Darby, Patterson | 2,757 |
| 25 September 1991 | Round 2 First Leg | Nottingham Forest | A | 0–4 | | 19,936 |
| 8 October 1991 | Round 2 Second Leg | Nottingham Forest | H | 2–5; 2–9 (agg) | Darby, Kelly | 5,469 |

=== Associate Members Cup ===
| Date | Round | Opponents | H / A | Result F–A | Scorers | Attendance |
|---|---|---|---|---|---|---|
| 19 November 1991 | Group Stage Game One | Preston North End | A | 1–0 | Reeves | 2,709 |
| 10 December 1991 | Group Stage Game Two | Rochdale | H | 4–1 | Reeves (3), Philliskirk | 3,278 |
| 19 January 1993 | Northern Section Round 1 | Crewe Alexandra | A | 0–2 | | 2,155 |

== Top scorers ==
| P | Player | Position | FL | FAC | LC | AMC | Total |
|---|---|---|---|---|---|---|---|
| 1 | (England) Tony Philliskirk | Striker | 12 | 5 | 1 | 1 | 19 |
| 2 | (Scotland) Andy Walker | Striker | 15 | 3 | 0 | 0 | 18 |
| 3 | (England) David Reeves | Striker | 8 | 3 | 0 | 4 | 15 |
| 4 | (England) Julian Darby | Midfielder | 6 | 1 | 3 | 0 | 10 |
