= 1990–91 Bolton Wanderers F.C. season =

Bolton Wanderers
1990–91 season
- Chairman: Gordon Hargreaves
- Manager: Phil Neal
- Stadium: Burnden Park
- Third Division: 4th
- FA Cup: 4th Round
- Rumbelows Cup: 2nd Round
- Leyland DAF Cup: Northern Section Semi Final
- Top goalscorer: League: Tony Philliskirk (19); All: Tony Philliskirk (28)
- Highest home attendance: 19,198 v Bury; 22 May 1991
- Lowest home attendance: 3,101 v Huddersfield Town; 4 September 1990

The 1990–1991 season was the 112th season in Bolton Wanderers F.C.'s existence, and their third successive season in the Football League Third Division. It covers the period from 1 July 1990 to 30 June 1991.

The club was knocked out of the FA Cup by Manchester United.

== Playing Squad ==
Note: Flags indicate national team as defined under FIFA eligibility rules; some limited exceptions apply. Players may hold more than one non-FIFA nationality.

Pos.	Nation	Player
GK	WAL	David Felgate
GK	ENG	Kevin Rose
DF	ENG	Phil Brown
DF	ENG	Barry Cowdrill
DF	ENG	Paul Comstive
DF	ENG	Mark Seagraves
DF	ENG	Alan Stubbs
DF	ENG	Stuart Storer
DF	ENG	Steve Thompson
DF	ENG	David Burke
DF	ENG	Scott Green
DF	ENG	Gary Henshaw
DF	ENG	Mark Came
DF	ENG	Dean Crombie

Pos.	Nation	Player
DF	ENG	Mark Winstanley
DF	ENG	Nicky Spooner
MF	ENG	Julian Darby
MF	ENG	Sammy Lee
MF	ENG	Neil Fisher
MF	ENG	Robbie Savage
FW	JAM	Tony Cunningham
FW	ENG	Tony Philliskirk
FW	ENG	Mark Patterson
FW	ENG	David Reeves
FW	ENG	Ian Stevens
FW	ENG	Mike Jeffrey
	ENG	Paul Hughes

== Results ==
=== Barclays League Division Three ===
Date	Opponents	H / A	Result F–A	Scorers	Attendance
25 August 1990	Shrewsbury Town	A	1–0	Storer	4,608
1 September 1990	Bradford City	H	0–1		7,031
8 September 1990	Huddersfield Town	A	0–4		5,419
15 September 1990	Crewe Alexandra	H	3–2	Green, Philliskirk, Darby	4,933
18 September 1990	Preston North End	H	1–2	Darby	5,844
22 September 1990	Brentford	A	2–4	Green, Reeves	5,077
28 September 1990	Wigan Athletic	A	1–2	Philliskirk	4,366
2 October 1990	Mansfield Town	H	1–1	Reeves	3,631
5 October 1990	Stoke City	H	0–1		8,521
13 October 1990	Bury	A	2–2	Thompson, Philliskirk	5,634
20 October 1990	Leyton Orient	A	1–0	Storer	4,121
23 October 1990	Rotherham United	H	0–0		4,692
27 October 1990	Swansea City	H	1–0	Philliskirk	4,158
3 November 1990	Chester City	A	2–0	Reeves, Philliskirk	2,553
10 November 1990	Reading	H	3–1	Thompson, Reeves	4,648
24 November 1990	Grimsby Town	A	1–0	Green	6,240
1 December 1990	Tranmere Rovers	H	2–1	Green, Philliskirk	6,941
15 December 1990	Fulham	A	1–0	Philiskirk	3,466
22 December 1990	Cambridge United	H	2–2	Storer, Thompson	5,800
26 December 1990	Southend United	A	1–1	Green	7,539
29 December 1990	Birmingham City	A	3–1	Reeves, Philliskirk, Darby	7,318
1 January 1991	Bournemouth	H	4–1	Comstive (2), Philliskirk, Darby	7,639
12 January 1991	Bradford City	A	1–1	Philliskirk	8,764
19 January 1991	Shrewsbury Town	H	1–0	Thompson	6,164
2 February 1991	Preston North End	A	2–1	Philliskirk (2)	9,844
5 February 1991	Brentford	H	1–0	(Own goal)	6,731
9 February 1991	Huddersfield Town	H	1–1	Philliskirk	7,947
13 February 1991	Exeter City	H	0–1		5,532
16 February 1991	Grimsby Town	H	0–0		10,318
23 February 1991	Reading	A	1–0	Cowdrill	5,997
1 March 1991	Tranmere Rovers	A	1–1	Patterson	10,076
9 March 1991	Fulham	H	3–0	Patterson, Philiskirk (2)	7,316
12 March 1991	Mansfield Town	A	0–4		3,611
16 March 1991	Wigan Athletic	H	2–1	Reeves, Darby	7,812
19 March 1991	Bury	H	1–3	Green	9,006
22 March 1991	Stoke City	A	2–2	Storer, Darby	13,869
26 March 1991	Exeter City	A	1–2	Reeves	4,009
30 March 1991	Southend United	H	1–0	Darby	10,666
2 April 1991	Cambridge United	A	1–2	Philliskirk	7,763
7 April 1991	Birmingham City	H	3–1	Cunningham, Philliskirk, Darby	11,280
13 April 1991	Southend United	A	0–1		7,156
16 April 1991	Crewe Alexandra	A	3–1	Philliskirk (2), Reeves	4,419
20 April 1991	Leyton Orient	H	1–0	Reeves	7,926
27 April 1991	Rotherham United	A	2–2	Cunningham (2)	8,045
4 May 1991	Swansea City	A	2–1	Storer, Darby	4,713
11 May 1991	Chester City	H	1–0	Cunningham	12,826

Pos	Team	Pld	W	D	L	GF	GA	GD	Pts	Promotion or relegation
2	Southend United (P)	46	26	7	13	67	51	+16	85	Promotion to the Second Division
3	Grimsby Town (P)	46	24	11	11	66	34	+32	83	Promotion to the Second Division
4	Bolton Wanderers	46	24	11	11	64	50	+14	83	Qualification for the Third Division play-offs
5	Tranmere Rovers (O, P)	46	23	9	14	64	46	+18	78	Qualification for the Third Division play-offs
6	Brentford	46	21	13	12	59	47	+12	76	Qualification for the Third Division play-offs

(O) Play-off winners; (P) Promoted

=== Barclays League Division Three play-offs ===
Date	Round	Opponents	H / A	Result F–A	Scorers	Attendance
19 May 1991	Semi-Final First Leg	Bury	A	1–1	Philliskirk	8,000
22 May 1991	Semi Final Second Leg	Bury	H	1–0; 2–1 (agg)	Philliskirk	19,198
1 June 1991	Final	Tranmere Rovers	Wembley Stadium	0–1		30,217

=== F.A. Cup ===
Date	Round	Opponents	H / A	Result F–A	Scorers	Attendance
17 November 1990	Round 1	Witton Albion	A	2–1	Darby, Comstive	3,790
11 December 1990	Round 2	Chesterfield	A	4–3	Storer, Thompson, Reeves, Philliskirk	4,836
5 January 1991	Round 3	Barrow	H	1–0	Philliskirk	11,475
26 January 1991	Round 4	Manchester United	A	0–1		43,293

=== Rumbelows Cup ===
Date	Round	Opponents	H / A	Result F–A	Scorers	Attendance
29 August 1990	Round 1 First Leg	Huddersfield Town	A	3–0	Philliskirk, Darby (2)	4,444
8 September 1990	Round 1 Second Leg	Huddersfield Town	H	2–1; 5–1 (agg)	Stubbs, Darby	3,101
26 September 1990	Round 2 First Leg	Coventry City	A	2–4	Philliskirk (2)	6,193
9 October 1990	Round 2 Second Leg	Coventry City	H	2–3; 4–7 (agg)	Philliskirk (2)	5,222

=== Leyland DAF Cup ===
Date	Round	Opponents	H / A	Result F–A	Scorers	Attendance
6 November 1990	Group Stage Game One	Tranmere Rovers	H	1–0	Reeves	3,178
18 December 1990	Group Stage Game Two	Blackpool	A	0–3		2,579

== Top scorers ==
P	Player	Position	FL	FAC	LC	LD	Total
1	(England) Tony Philliskirk	Striker	19	2	5	0	26
2	(England) Julian Darby	Midfielder	9	1	3	0	13
3	(England) David Reeves	Striker	10	1	0	1	12
4=	(England) Stuart Storer	Midfielder	5	1	0	0	6
4=	(England) Scott Green	Midfielder	6	0	0	0	6
4=	(England) Steve Thompson	Midfielder	5	1	0	0	6
