= 1993–94 Bolton Wanderers F.C. season =

Bolton Wanderers
1993–94 season
- Chairman: Gordon Hargreaves
- Manager: Bruce Rioch
- Stadium: Burnden Park
- First Division: 14th
- FA Cup: Quarter Final
- Coca Cola Cup: 2nd Round
- Anglo-Italian Cup: Group Stage
- Top goalscorer: League: John McGinlay (25); All: John McGinlay (33)
- Highest home attendance: 21,072 v Everton; 8 January 1994
- Lowest home attendance: 3,021 v Brescia; 11 November 1993

The 1993–1994 season was the 115th season in Bolton Wanderers F.C.'s existence, and their first season back in the Football League First Division for nine years following promotion from the Football League Second Division. It covers the period from 1 July 1993 to 30 June 1994.

== Results ==
=== Endsleigh League First Division ===
Date	Opponents	H / A	Result F–A	Scorers	Attendance
14 August 1993	Grimsby Town	A	0–0		8,593
21 August 1993	Stoke City	H	1–1	Coyle	11,328
28 August 1993	Charlton Athletic	A	0–3		7,573
31 August 1993	Oxford United	H	1–0	McGinlay	8,230
11 September 1993	Luton Town	H	2–0	McGinlay (2)	7,189
18 September 1993	Leicester City	H	1–2	McGinlay (pen)	12,049
26 September 1993	Nottingham Forest	H	4–3	Lee (2), Thompson, Patterson	10,578
2 October 1993	Bristol City	A	0–2		7,704
9 October 1993	Tranmere Rovers	A	1–2	Brown	10,128
16 October 1993	Millwall	H	4–0	McGinlay (2), McAteer, Lee	9,386
19 October 1993	Birmingham City	A	1–2	Thompson	12,071
23 October 1993	Watford	A	3–4	McAteer, Lee, Thompson	7,492
30 October 1993	Derby County	H	0–2		11,464
2 November 1993	Peterborough United	H	1–1	McGinlay	7,058
6 November 1993	West Bromwich Albion	A	2–2	Green, McAteer	15,709
21 November 1993	Middlesbrough	A	1–0	McGinlay	6,828
24 November 1993	Crystal Palace	H	1–0	McGinlay	7,486
27 November 1993	Barnsley	A	1–1	Coyle	6,755
7 December 1993	West Bromwich Albion	H	1–1	Coyle	9,277
11 December 1993	Oxford United	A	2–0	Thompson, Kelly	5,559
18 December 1993	Grimsby Town	H	1–1	Coyle	9,431
27 December 1993	Sunderland	H	0–0		18,496
28 December 1993	Portsmouth	A	0–0		14,276
1 January 1994	Notts County	H	4–2	Fleck, Green, Thompson, Draper (og)	11,041
3 January 1994	Wolverhampton Wanderers	A	0–1		24,053
12 January 1994	Southend United	A	2–0	Stubbs, McGinlay	4,969
15 January 1994	Millwall	A	0–1		9,772
23 January 1994	Tranmere Rovers	H	2–1	McGinlay (2)	11,550
5 February 1994	Watford	H	3–1	Coyle, Watson (og), McGinlay (pen)	10,150
12 February 1994	Derby County	A	0–2		16,698
22 February 1994	Stoke City	A	0–2		14,257
26 February 1994	Crystal Palace	A	1–1	Coyle	17,245
5 March 1994	Charlton Athletic	H	3–2	McGinlay (3) (1pen)	13,027
19 March 1994	Nottingham Forest	A	2–3	Brown, Green	23,846
26 March 1994	Bristol City	H	2–2	Lee, Coyle	10,221
29 March 1994	Wolverhampton Wanderers	H	1–3	McGinlay	12,405
2 April 1994	Sunderland	A	0–2		18,574
4 April 1994	Portsmouth	H	1–1	McGinlay	9,560
9 April 1994	Notts County	A	1–2	McGinlay	7,270
12 April 1994	Southend United	H	0–2		7,140
16 April 1994	Peterborough United	A	3–2	Walker (2), Welsh (og)	6,616
23 April 1994	Middlesbrough	H	4–1	McGinlay (3), Green	9,220
30 April 1994	Birmingham City	H	1–1	Walker	13,602
3 May 1994	Leicester City	A	1–1	McGinlay	18,145
5 May 1994	Luton Town	H	2–1	McGinlay, Thompson	7,102
8 May 1994	Barnsley	H	2–3	Seagraves, McGinlay	16,853

Pos	Team	Pld	W	D	L	GF	GA	GD	Pts
12	Sunderland	46	19	8	19	54	57	−3	65
13	Bristol City	46	16	16	14	47	50	−3	64
14	Bolton Wanderers	46	15	14	17	63	64	−1	59
15	Southend United	46	17	8	21	63	67	−4	59
16	Grimsby Town	46	13	20	13	52	47	+5	59

Source: rsssf.com
Rules for classification: 1) Points; 2) Goals scored; 3) Goal difference

=== F.A. Cup ===
Date	Round	Opponents	H / A	Result F–A	Scorers	Attendance
13 November 1993	Round 1	Gretna	A (played at Burnden Park)	3–2	McGinlay (pen), Coyle (2)	6,447
4 December 1993	Round 2	Lincoln City	A	3–1	Thompson, Brown, Coyle	6,250
8 January 1994	Round 3	Everton	H	1–1	Patterson	21,072
19 January 1994	Round 3 replay	Everton	A	3–2 (a.e.t.)	McGinlay, Stubbs, Coyle	34,652
31 January 1994	Round 4	Arsenal	H	2–2	McAteer, Coyle	18,891
9 February 1994	Round 4 replay	Arsenal	A	3–1 (a.e.t.)	McGinlay, McAteer, Walker	33,863
20 February 1994	Round 5	Aston Villa	H	1–0	Stubbs	18,817
12 March 1994	Round 6	Oldham Athletic	H	0–1		20,321

=== Coca-Cola Cup ===
Date	Round	Opponents	H / A	Result F–A	Scorers	Attendance
17 August 1993	Round 1 First Leg	Bury	H	0–2		6,455
24 August 1993	Round 1 Second Leg	Bury	A	2–0; 2–0 (agg); Won 3–0 on penalties	Coyle, McGinlay	4,528
21 September 1993	Round 2 First Leg	Sheffield Wednesday	H	1–1	Kelly (pen)	11,590
6 October 1993	Round 2 Second Leg	Sheffield Wednesday	A	0–1; 1–2 (agg)		16,194

=== Anglo Italian Cup ===
Date	Round	Opponents	H / A	Result F–A	Scorers	Attendance
7 September 1993	Qualifying Group Stage	Tranmere Rovers	A	2–1	McGinlay, Coyle	2,786
14 September 1993	Qualifying Group Stage	Sunderland	H	2–0	Coyle (2)	3,460
12 October 1993	Group Stage	Ancona	H	5–0	McGinlay (2), McAteer, Thompson, Phillips	3,448
9 November 1993	Group Stage	Brescia	H	3–3	Coyle, McGinlay, Green	3,021
16 November 1993	Group Stage	Pisa	A	1–1	Phillips	1,000
22 December 1993	Group Stage	Ascoli	A	1–1	Seagraves	1,000

== Top scorers ==
P	Player	Position	FL	FAC	LC	AIC	Total
1	(Scotland) John McGinlay	Striker	25	3	1	4	33
2	(Scotland) Owen Coyle	Striker	7	5	1	4	17
3	(England) Alan Thompson	Midfielder	6	1	0	1	8
4	(Republic of Ireland) Jason McAteer	Midfielder	3	2	0	1	6
5=	(England) Scott Green	Midfielder	4	0	0	1	5
5=	(England) David Lee	Midfielder	5	0	0	0	5
