= Tony Kelly (footballer, born 1964) =

English footballer

Personal information
- Full name: Anthony Gerald Kelly
- Date of birth: 1 October 1964 (age 62)
- Place of birth: Prescot, England
- Height: 5 ft 10 in (1.78 m)
- Position: Midfielder

Youth career
- 1982–1983: Liverpool
- 1983–1984: Prescot Cables

Senior career*
Years	Team	Apps	(Gls)
1984–1986	Wigan Athletic	101	(15)
1986–1987	Stoke City	36	(4)
1988–1989	West Bromwich Albion	26	(1)
1988	→ Chester City (loan)	5	(0)
1988	→ Colchester United (loan)	13	(2)
1989–1991	Shrewsbury Town	101	(15)
1991–1994	Bolton Wanderers	106	(5)
1994	Port Vale	4	(1)
1994	Millwall	2	(0)
1994	Wigan Athletic	0	(0)
1994–1995	Peterborough United	13	(2)
1995–1996	Wigan Athletic	2	(0)
1996–1997	Altrincham		
1997	Sligo Rovers	13	(1)
Total		422	(46)
- * Club domestic league appearances and goals

Anthony Gerald Kelly (born 1 October 1964) is an English former footballer who played mainly in central midfield.

A former Liverpool trainee, he moved from non-League Prescot Cables to Wigan Athletic in 1984. The club's Player of the Year in 1985, he also helped Wigan to victory in the 1985 Associate Members' Cup final. sold to Stoke City in 1986 for a £80,000 fee, he was moved on to West Bromwich Albion for £60,000 a year later. Loaned out to Chester City and Colchester United, he was transferred to Shrewsbury Town in January 1989 for a £30,000 fee. Two years and more than 100 games later, he was sold to Bolton Wanderers for £100,000. A popular player at Bolton, he helped the club to win promotion out of the Second Division in 1992–93. Released in 1994, he had brief spells at Port Vale, Millwall, Wigan Athletic, Peterborough United, Altrincham and Sligo Rovers, before he retired in 1997.

== Career ==
=== Wigan Athletic ===
Kelly began his career as an apprentice at Liverpool, before joining non-League Prescot Cables in 1983. He returned to the Football League in January 1984, signing for Third Division Wigan Athletic. He made just over 100 appearances for Wigan. He was voted Player of the Year in 1985, after he scored in a 3–1 victory over Brentford in the Associate Members' Cup final at Wembley. The club missed out on promotion in 1985–86 after finishing one point behind third-place Derby County.

=== Stoke City ===
He moved on to Second Division Stoke City in April 1986, as manager Mick Mills paid out a fee of £80,000. However, Mills and Kelly did not enjoy a happy relationship. Mills ordered Kelly to lose weight not long after he arrived at the Victoria Ground. He still played 43 games for the "Potters" in 1986–87, scoring four goals, before he was sold to Ron Saunders' West Bromwich Albion for £60,000 in July 1987.

=== West Bromwich Albion ===
Ron Atkinson replaced Saunders as manager in September 1987, and so Kelly's impact at The Hawthorns was limited in 1987–88. He instead had successive loan outings with Chester City and Colchester United in 1988. At Chester, he was reunited with Harry McNally, the man who had signed him at Wigan; however, he only played five league games for the "Seals". At Colchester, he was signed by Steve Foley on 24 October and scored two goals in twenty games for Colchester in the 1988–89 season, as the club struggled at the foot of the Fourth Division. He was substituted at half-time by Jock Wallace in United's match at York City on 21 January and left the ground without saying goodbye to his teammates, ending his loan spell at Layer Road.

=== Shrewsbury Town ===
In January 1989, Shrewsbury Town manager Ian McNeill secured Kelly's services for £30,000. Just as with Wigan some years previous, he scored 15 goals in 101 Third Division appearances, however, this time after two years he was sold to Phil Neal's Bolton Wanderers for £100,000.

=== Bolton Wanderers ===
He established himself in the first team in 1991–92, and his consistent performances led to him being named on the PFA Team of the Year. He continued to be a first-team regular under new manager Bruce Rioch. He helped the "Trotters" to win promotion out of the Second Division as runners-up in 1992–93 before leaving the club at the end of the 1993–94 campaign.

In three years with Bolton, Kelly became a firm favourite with the fans, who nicknamed him Zico in homage to Kelly's footballing style, despite his (at times) obvious weight and fitness problems. He was a cult figure with the fans during his stay at Burnden Park. He was a key figure in the exciting team that Bruce Rioch built, as Bolton rose from Third Division obscurities to FA Cup 'giant killings' and pushing at the door of the newly formed Premier League. In total he amassed over 100 league appearances for the club before September 1994, when at age of 30 he was given a free transfer to Port Vale.

=== Later career ===
He did not find success at Vale Park, despite finding the net against Notts County, and instead moved on to Millwall later in 1994. Kelly struggled to regain his form and fitness, and after two games for the "Lions" he returned to former club Wigan Athletic, before signing for Peterborough United. He played 13 league games for United before returning to Wigan in 1995 and finally dropping out of the Football League as he joined non-League Altrincham in February 1996. In 1997, he enjoyed a spell in the League of Ireland with Sligo Rovers under Jimmy Mullen; Kelly scored his only league goal for the club on his debut; he made a total of 17 appearances for Sligo before retiring.

== Post-retirement ==
In 2008, Kelly rejoined Bolton Wanderers as Fans Liaison Officer. Like his former teammate John McGinlay, Kelly is a 'converted' Bolton fan and has a weekly column in The Bolton News where he gives an insight into recent events at the Wanderers. He now also coaches Bolton Wanderers' U18s alongside David Lee, Kelly's former teammate. In a September 2008 poll of Bolton fans, Kelly was voted the 34th greatest player ever to don a Bolton shirt. Kelly regularly takes part in charity football events at BWFC.

== Personal life ==
Kelly is the uncle of Joey Barton.

== Career statistics ==
Appearances and goals by club, season and competition
Club	Season	League			FA Cup		League Cup		Other^{[A]}		Total	
Club	Season	Division	Apps	Goals	Apps	Goals	Apps	Goals	Apps	Goals	Apps	Goals
Wigan Athletic	1983–84	Third Division	29	2	1	0	0	0	1	0	31	2
Wigan Athletic	1984–85	Third Division	40	4	4	0	2	0	7	3	53	7
Wigan Athletic	1985–86	Third Division	32	9	5	1	2	3	4	0	43	13
Wigan Athletic	Total		101	15	10	1	4	3	12	3	127	22
Stoke City	1985–86	Second Division	1	0	0	0	0	0	0	0	1	0
Stoke City	1986–87	Second Division	35	4	5	0	2	0	1	0	43	4
Stoke City	Total		36	4	5	0	2	0	1	0	44	4
West Bromwich Albion	1987–88	Second Division	26	1	1	0	2	0	1	0	30	1
West Bromwich Albion	1988–89	Second Division	0	0	0	0	0	0	0	0	0	0
West Bromwich Albion	Total		26	1	1	0	2	0	1	0	30	1
Chester City (loan)	1988–89	Third Division	5	0	0	0	2	0	0	0	7	0
Colchester United (loan)	1988–89	Fourth Division	13	2	4	0	0	0	3	0	20	2
Shrewsbury Town	1988–89	Second Division	20	5	0	0	0	0	0	0	20	5
Shrewsbury Town	1989–90	Third Division	43	5	1	0	4	0	3	0	51	5
Shrewsbury Town	1990–91	Third Division	38	5	6	1	4	1	1	0	49	7
Shrewsbury Town	Total		101	15	7	1	8	1	4	0	120	17
Bolton Wanderers	1991–92	Third Division	31	2	6	0	4	1	3	0	44	3
Bolton Wanderers	1992–93	Second Division	36	2	5	0	1	0	3	1	45	3
Bolton Wanderers	1993–94	First Division	35	1	7	0	4	1	3	0	49	2
Bolton Wanderers	1994–95	First Division	4	0	0	0	0	0	0	0	4	0
Bolton Wanderers	Total		106	5	18	0	9	2	9	1	142	8
Port Vale	1994–95	First Division	4	1	0	0	1	0	0	0	5	1
Millwall	1994–95	First Division	2	0	0	0	0	0	0	0	2	0
Peterborough United	1994–95	Second Division	13	2	0	0	0	0	0	0	13	2
Wigan Athletic	1995–96	Third Division	2	0	0	0	0	0	1	0	3	0
Career total			409	45	45	2	28	6	31	4	513	57

A. The "Other" column constitutes appearances and goals in the Anglo-Italian Cup, Football League Trophy and Full Members Cup.

== Honours ==
Wigan Athletic

- Associate Members' Cup: 1984–85

Bolton Wanderers

- Football League Second Division second-place promotion: 1992–93

Individual

- Wigan Athletic Player of the Year: 1985
- PFA Team of the Year: 1991–92 Third Division
