= 1995 Football League Cup final =

- Match programme cover
- Event: 1994–95 Football League Cup
Bolton Wanderers	Liverpool
1	2
- Date: 2 April 1995
- Venue: Wembley Stadium, London
- Man of the Match: Steve McManaman (Liverpool)
- Referee: Philip Don (Middlesex)
- Attendance: 75,595

The 1995 Football League Cup final was a football match played between Bolton Wanderers and Liverpool on 2 April 1995 at Wembley Stadium, London. It was the final match of the 1994–95 Football League Cup, the 35th staging of the Football League Cup, a football competition for the 92 teams in the Premier League and The Football League. This was Bolton's first-ever final appearance. In contrast, Liverpool appeared in their seventh final, having previously won four and lost twice.

Both teams entered the competition in the second round. Bolton's matches were equally close. Their biggest margin of victory was three goals in the second round against Ipswich Town, while they beat Norwich City by a single goal in the quarter-finals. Liverpool's matches were closely contested, with the exception of a 4–1 victory over Burnley in the second round. Otherwise, their biggest margin of victory was by two goals over Blackburn Rovers in the fourth round.

Watched by a crowd of 75,595, Bolton controlled the early exchanges in the match, but it was Liverpool who took the lead in the 37th minute when Steve McManaman scored. McManaman scored again in the 68th minute to extend Liverpool's lead to two goals. However, a minute later, Alan Thompson scored for Bolton to reduce the deficit to one goal. Despite repeated attacks, Bolton did not score an equaliser and Liverpool won the match 2–1.

Liverpool's victory was their fifth in the competition. McManaman was named as man of the match and awarded the Alan Hardaker Trophy. His performance was praised by both managers, as was the performance of both teams. Liverpool's win qualified Liverpool to play in European competition the following season, while Bolton would win promotion to the Premier League following a 4–3 victory in the First Division play-off final.

== Route to the final ==
=== Bolton Wanderers ===
Bolton entered the competition in the second round, where they faced Premier League team Ipswich Town. The first leg, held at Ipswich's home ground Portman Road, was won 3–0 by Bolton. Bolton won the second leg 1–0 at their home ground, Burnden Park, to progress to the third round courtesy of a 4–0 aggregate victory. Fellow First Division team Sheffield United were the opposition in the third round. The march held at United's home ground, Bramall Lane, was won 2–1 by Bolton.

Bolton were drawn against Premier League team West Ham United in the fourth round. The match held at West Ham's home ground, The Boleyn Ground, was won 3–1 by Bolton as they progressed to the quarter-finals. Their opposition were Norwich City of the Premier League. Bolton won 1–0 at Burnden Park to progress to the semi-finals.

Fellow First Division side Swindon Town were the opposition in the semi-finals. Swindon won the first leg at their home ground, the County Ground 2–1. Bolton recovered in the second leg to win 3–1, which meant they progressed to the final courtesy of a 4–3 aggregate victory.

=== Liverpool ===
Liverpool entered the competition in the second round, where they drawn against First Division team Burnley. The tie was played over two legs, with the first leg held at Liverpool's home ground Anfield. Goals from defender John Scales and striker Robbie Fowler secured a 2–0 victory for Liverpool. The second leg was held at Burnley's home ground Turf Moor, which Liverpool won 4–1 to progress to the third round courtesy of a 6–1 aggregate victory.

First Division team Stoke City were the opposition in the third round, with the match held at Anfield. Striker Ian Rush put Liverpool ahead in the fourth minute, but Stoke striker Paul Peschisolido equalised in the 40th minute. A further goal from Rush in the second half secured a 2–1 victory for Liverpool. Liverpool's opposition in the fourth round were fellow Premier League team Blackburn Rovers, at whose ground, Ewood Park, the match was held at. Three goals from Rush gave Liverpool a 3–1 victory and progression to the quarter-finals.

Fellow Premier League team Arsenal were the opposition in the quarter-finals. A goal from Rush in the 59th minute secured a 1–0 victory. Liverpool's opponents in the semi-finals, which were held over two legs, was First Division team Crystal Palace. The first leg, held at Anfield, was goalless until the 90th minute when striker Fowler scored. The second leg was held at Palace's home ground, Selhurst Park. A goal from Fowler in the 27th minute secured victory and a 2–0 aggregate win meant Liverpool progressed to the final.

=== Results ===
Bolton		Round	Liverpool
Opponent	Result		Opponent	Result
Ipswich Town (a)	3–0	2nd round	Burnley (h)	2–0
Ipswich Town (h)	1–0	2nd round	Burnley (a)	4–1
Sheffield United (a)	2–1	3rd round	Stoke City (h)	2–1
West Ham United (a)	3–1	4th Round	Blackburn Rovers (a)	3–1
Norwich City (h)	1–0	Quarterfinals	Arsenal (h)	1–0
Swindon Town (a)	1–2	Semifinals	Crystal Palace (h)	1–0
Swindon Town (h)	3–1	Semifinals	Crystal Palace (a)	1–0

== Match ==
=== Background ===
The final was held at Wembley Stadium.

Bolton were appearing in their first final, they had previously reached the semi-finals during the 1976–77 Football League Cup. Liverpool were appearing in their seventh final. They had won four (1981, 1982, 1983, 1984) and lost two (1978, 1987). The last meeting between the two sides was on 13 January 1993, in a replay of their third round tie in the 1992–93 FA Cup. Bolton won the match 2–0.

Despite their history in the competition, Liverpool manager Roy Evans, felt this would not count for anything in the final: "Our players haven't really got that much Wembley experience, certainly not in terms of finals. It will be good for us to have Ian Rush and John Barnes out there." Striker Rush had picked up a hamstring injury while playing for the Welsh national team against Bulgaria, but was expected to be fit. Midfielder Mark Kennedy would not feature in the final as he was ineligible.

Bolton defender Alan Stubbs was confident Bolton could cause Liverpool problems: "I think if you look round the team we have got good quality everywhere and that's why we are doing so well, we have also got good players in reserve who can come in and do a job. We have played together for a long time and we are strong both mentally and physically this year. And if the forwards have not been scoring, the midfield and wingers have."

=== First half ===
Bolton had the best chances in the first part of the first-half. Midfielder David Lee caused trouble for Liverpool defender Stig Inge Bjørnebye in the opening minutes, while fellow defender Phil Babb was shown a yellow card in the 20th minute for tripping Lee. The Bolton midfielder came close to opening the scoring in the 30th minute. A lofted pass by Jason McAteer sent him clear of the Liverpool defence, he subsequently beat Liverpool goalkeeper David James to the ball, but his shot 30 yards (27 m) from goal went wide of the goal. Bolton had another chance four minutes later. Midfielder Alan Thompson received the ball from a Jimmy Phillips thrown in, but his volleyed shot 25 yards (23 m) from goal was pushed onto the crossbar by James.

Despite their strong first half up to that point, Bolton went a goal behind in the 37th minute. Liverpool midfielder Steve McManaman received the ball from John Barnes, he ran past Bolton defender Alan Stubbs, then past Scott Green. His subsequent shot was not powerful, but Bolton goalkeeper Keith Branagan could not stop the ball from going into the goal, giving Liverpool a 1–0 lead.

=== Second half ===
Bolton started the second half on the attack. Bolton were awarded a free-kick, following a foul on Thompson, by Liverpool defender Rob Jones, who was shown a yellow card. From the subsequent free-kick, Bolton striker John McGinlay received the ball, keeping it from the onrushing James, his pass into the Liverpool penalty area found Mixu Paatelainen whose volleyed shot went wide of the Liverpool goal. Bolton had another attack almost immediately. A pass by McAteer found Thompson on the right side of the pitch, but his shot went across the face of the Liverpool goal. Liverpool began to assert more pressure following the attack. A pass by striker Ian Rush in the 52nd minute found Bjørnebye, whose subsequent shot hit the post. Another Liverpool attack was stopped by Bolton defender Mark Seagraves as he intercepted a cross from Bjørnebye to Rush, but his interception went towards the Bolton goal and was only stopped by Branagan.

Liverpool's pressure paid off in the 68th minute as McManaman scored a second goal. From the left side of the pitch, McManaman went past Green, then McAteer, before he got in front of Seagraves and scored with a shot into the Bolton goal. Bolton replied immediately. Liverpool defender Neil Ruddock's clearance was played back into the Liverpool penalty area by Guðni Bergsson who had replaced Green. Paatelainen headed the ball onto Thompson, whose shot went into the Liverpool goal. Bolton continued to pressure Liverpool in search of the equaliser but were unable to score and Liverpool won the match 2–1 to claim their fifth League Cup victory.

=== Details ===
2 April 1995
17:00 BST

Bolton Wanderers	1–2	Liverpool
Thompson 70'	(Report)	McManaman 37', 68'

Wembley Stadium, London
Attendance: 75,595
Referee: Philip Don (Middlesex)

Bolton Wanderers	Liverpool

GK	1	(Republic of Ireland) Keith Branagan
RB	2	(England) Scott Green		(substituted off) 65'
CB	5	(England) Mark Seagraves
CB	6	(England) Alan Stubbs (c)
LB	3	(England) Jimmy Phillips
RM	7	(England) David Lee
CM	8	(Netherlands) Richard Sneekes
CM	4	(Republic of Ireland) Jason McAteer
LM	11	(England) Alan Thompson	Yellow card
CF	9	(Finland) Mixu Paatelainen
CF	10	(Scotland) John McGinlay
Substitutes:
GK	16	(Northern Ireland) Aidan Davison
DF	14	(Iceland) Guðni Bergsson		(substituted on) 65'
MF	12	(England) Mark Patterson
Manager:
(Scotland) Bruce Rioch

GK	1	(England) David James
RWB	2	(England) Rob Jones	Yellow card
CB	6	(Republic of Ireland) Phil Babb	(yellow card) 20'
CB	12	(England) John Scales
CB	25	(England) Neil Ruddock
LWB	20	(Norway) Stig Inge Bjørnebye	Yellow card
CM	10	(England) John Barnes
CM	15	(England) Jamie Redknapp
AM	17	(England) Steve McManaman
CF	9	(Wales) Ian Rush (c)
CF	23	(England) Robbie Fowler
Substitutes:
GK	28	(England) Alec Chamberlain
MF	11	(England) Mark Walters
MF	16	(England) Michael Thomas
Manager:
(England) Roy Evans

Man of the match

- Steve McManaman (Liverpool)

Linesmen

- Bob Jeavons (West Midlands)
- Roy Pearson (County Durham)

Match rules

- 90 minutes.
- 30 minutes of extra-time if necessary.
- Penalty shootout if scores still level.
- Three named substitutes.
- Maximum of three substitutions.

== Post match ==
Liverpool captain Rush collected the trophy from the Royal box at Wembley Stadium. Liverpool's victory meant Rush won the competition for the fifth time in his career, which is a record. McManaman was awarded the Alan Hardaker Trophy as man of the match. McManaman praised the performance of the Bolton players: "Give Bolton their due, they battled back in the second half like we knew they would but it was a great team effort by our lads and I was just happy to get two goals like that." Liverpool manager Roy Evans praised the performance of McManaman stating: "The two goals were fantastic. Sometimes he does need a kick up the backside, but they were really two great goals." Evans was also delighted to have won his first trophy as Liverpool manager: "We believed that we've always had a decent squad with players of outstanding ability. The way the lads have worked this season is outstanding. This cup is the first step. We are in Europe and we are delighted."

Despite his team's defeat, Bolton manager Bruce Rioch praised the performance of Liverpool: "I'm delighted for Roy, if you're going to lose in a cup final then the winner couldn't have gone to a better club." Rioch also stated that the final "was great for the town and great for the people." Bolton would return to Wembley in May when they progressed to the First Division play-off final. A 4–3 win secured promotion to the Premier League for the following season. Liverpool's victory earned them qualification into European competition, the 1995–96 UEFA Cup. They would finish the 1994–95 season in fourth place in the Premier League, 15 points behind eventual winners Blackburn Rovers.
