= List of EFL Championship seasons =

This article lists seasons played in the second tier of English football from 1992–93, when the old Football League First Division was replaced by the Premier League as the top-level. Football League Division One was renamed the Football League Championship from 2004–05.

== Seasons ==
Season	Champions		Runners-up		Play-off winners	Relegated to League One	Relegated from Premier League	Promoted from League One	Top goal scorers	
Season	Club	Pts	Club	Pts	Club	Relegated to League One	Relegated from Premier League	Promoted from League One	Player	Goals
1992–93	Newcastle United	96	West Ham United	88	Swindon Town	Brentford; Cambridge United; Bristol Rovers	Crystal Palace; Middlesbrough; Nottingham Forest	Stoke City; Bolton Wanderers; West Bromwich Albion	Guy Whittingham (Portsmouth)	42
1993–94	Crystal Palace	90	Nottingham Forest	83	Leicester City	Birmingham City; Oxford United; Peterborough United	Sheffield United; Oldham Athletic; Swindon Town	Reading; Port Vale; Burnley	John McGinlay (Bolton Wanderers)	25
1994–95	Middlesbrough	82	Reading (Note: During the 1994–95 season the Premier League was to be reduced to twenty teams from twenty-two, so there were four relegation places in the Premier League and in Division One and only two promotion places in Division One and Division Two, therefore the runners-up didn't earn automatic promotion.)	78	Bolton Wanderers	Swindon Town; Burnley; Bristol City; Notts County	Crystal Palace; Norwich City; Leicester City; Ipswich Town	Birmingham City; Huddersfield Town	John Aldridge (Tranmere Rovers)	24
1995–96	Sunderland	83	Derby County	79	Leicester City	Millwall; Watford; Luton Town	Manchester City; Queens Park Rangers; Bolton Wanderers	Swindon Town; Oxford United; Bradford City	John Aldridge (Tranmere Rovers)	27
1996–97	Bolton Wanderers	98	Barnsley	80	Crystal Palace	Grimsby Town; Oldham Athletic; Southend United	Sunderland; Middlesbrough; Nottingham Forest	Bury; Stockport County; Crewe Alexandra	John McGinlay (Bolton Wanderers)	27
1997–98	Nottingham Forest	94	Middlesbrough	91	Charlton Athletic	Manchester City; Stoke City; Reading	Bolton Wanderers; Barnsley; Crystal Palace	Watford; Bristol City; Grimsby Town	Pierre van Hooijdonk (Nottingham Forest); Kevin Phillips (Sunderland)	29
1998–99	Sunderland	105	Bradford City	87	Watford	Bury; Oxford United; Bristol City	Charlton Athletic; Blackburn Rovers; Nottingham Forest	Fulham; Walsall; Manchester City	Lee Hughes (West Bromwich Albion)	31
1999–2000	Charlton Athletic	91	Manchester City	89	Ipswich Town	Walsall; Port Vale; Swindon Town	Wimbledon; Sheffield Wednesday; Watford	Preston North End; Burnley; Gillingham	Andy Hunt (Charlton Athletic)	24
2000–01	Fulham	101	Blackburn Rovers	91	Bolton Wanderers	Huddersfield Town; Queens Park Rangers; Tranmere Rovers	Manchester City; Coventry City; Bradford City	Millwall; Rotherham United; Walsall	Louis Saha (Fulham)	27
2001–02	Manchester City	99	West Bromwich Albion	89	Birmingham City	Crewe Alexandra; Barnsley; Stockport County	Ipswich Town; Derby County; Leicester City	Brighton & Hove Albion; Reading; Stoke City	Shaun Goater (Manchester City)	28
2002–03	Portsmouth	98	Leicester City	92	Wolverhampton Wanderers	Sheffield Wednesday; Brighton & Hove Albion; Grimsby Town	West Ham United; West Bromwich Albion; Sunderland	Wigan Athletic; Crewe Alexandra; Cardiff City	Svetoslav Todorov (Portsmouth)	26
2003–04	Norwich City	94	West Bromwich Albion	86	Crystal Palace	Walsall; Bradford City; Wimbledon	Leicester City; Leeds United; Wolves	Plymouth Argyle; Queens Park Rangers; Brighton & Hove Albion	Andrew Johnson (Crystal Palace)	27
Football League Championship
2004–05	Sunderland	94	Wigan Athletic	87	West Ham United	Gillingham; Nottingham Forest; Rotherham United	Crystal Palace; Norwich City; Southampton	Luton Town; Hull City; Sheffield Wednesday	Nathan Ellington (Wigan Athletic)	24
2005–06	Reading	106	Sheffield United	90	Watford	Crewe Alexandra; Millwall; Brighton & Hove Albion	Birmingham City; West Bromwich Albion; Sunderland	Southend United; Colchester United; Barnsley	Marlon King (Watford)	21
2006–07	Sunderland	88	Birmingham City	86	Derby County	Southend United; Luton Town; Leeds United	Sheffield United; Charlton Athletic; Watford	Scunthorpe United; Bristol City; Blackpool	Jamie Cureton (Colchester United)	23
2007–08	West Bromwich Albion	81	Stoke City	79	Hull City	Leicester City; Scunthorpe United; Colchester United	Reading; Birmingham City; Derby County	Swansea City; Nottingham Forest; Doncaster Rovers	Sylvan Ebanks-Blake (Plymouth Argyle/Wolverhampton Wanderers)	23
2008–09	Wolverhampton Wanderers	90	Birmingham City	83	Burnley	Norwich City; Southampton; Charlton Athletic	Newcastle United; Middlesbrough; West Bromwich Albion	Leicester City; Peterborough United; Scunthorpe United	Sylvan Ebanks-Blake (Wolverhampton Wanderers)	25
2009–10	Newcastle United	102	West Bromwich Albion	91	Blackpool	Sheffield Wednesday; Plymouth Argyle; Peterborough United	Hull City; Burnley; Portsmouth	Norwich City; Leeds United; Millwall	Nicky Maynard (Bristol City); Peter Whittingham (Cardiff City)	20
2010–11	Queens Park Rangers	88	Norwich City	84	Swansea City	Preston North End; Scunthorpe United; Sheffield United	Birmingham City; Blackpool; West Ham United	Brighton & Hove Albion; Southampton; Peterborough United	Danny Graham (Watford)	24
2011–12	Reading	89	Southampton	88	West Ham United	Portsmouth; Coventry City; Doncaster Rovers	Bolton Wanderers; Blackburn Rovers; Wolves	Charlton Athletic; Sheffield Wednesday; Huddersfield Town	Rickie Lambert	27
2012–13	Cardiff City	87	Hull City	79	Crystal Palace	Peterborough United; Wolves; Bristol City	Reading; Queens Park Rangers; Wigan Athletic	Bournemouth; Doncaster Rovers; Yeovil Town	Glenn Murray (Crystal Palace)	30
2013–14	Leicester City	102	Burnley	93	Queens Park Rangers	Yeovil Town; Barnsley; Doncaster Rovers	Cardiff City; Fulham; Norwich City	Wolves; Brentford; Rotherham United	Ross McCormack (Leeds United)	28
2014–15	AFC Bournemouth	90	Watford	89	Norwich City	Millwall; Wigan Athletic; Blackpool	Hull City; Burnley; Queens Park Rangers	Bristol City; Milton Keynes Dons; Preston North End	Daryl Murphy (Ipswich Town)	27
2015–16	Burnley	93	Middlesbrough	89	Hull City	Charlton Athletic; Milton Keynes Dons; Bolton Wanderers	Newcastle United; Norwich City; Aston Villa	Wigan Athletic; Burton Albion; Barnsley	Andre Gray (Burnley)	25
2016–17	Newcastle United	94	Brighton & Hove Albion	93	Huddersfield Town	Blackburn Rovers; Wigan Athletic; Rotherham United	Hull City; Middlesbrough; Sunderland	Sheffield United; Bolton Wanderers; Millwall	Chris Wood (Leeds United)	27
2017–18	Wolverhampton Wanderers	99	Cardiff City	90	Fulham	Barnsley; Burton Albion; Sunderland	Swansea City; Stoke City; West Bromwich Albion	Wigan Athletic; Blackburn Rovers; Rotherham United	Matěj Vydra (Derby County)	21
2018–19	Norwich City	94	Sheffield United	89	Aston Villa	Rotherham United; Bolton Wanderers; Ipswich Town	Cardiff City; Fulham; Huddersfield Town	Luton Town; Barnsley; Charlton Athletic	Teemu Pukki (Norwich City)	29
2019–20	Leeds United	93	West Bromwich Albion	83	Fulham	Charlton Athletic; Wigan Athletic; Hull City	Watford; Bournemouth; Norwich City	Coventry City; Rotherham United; Wycombe Wanderers	Aleksandar Mitrović (Fulham); Ollie Watkins (Brentford)	26
2020–21	Norwich City	97	Watford	91	Brentford	Wycombe Wanderers; Rotherham United; Sheffield Wednesday	Fulham; West Bromwich Albion; Sheffield United	Hull City; Peterborough United; Blackpool	Ivan Toney (Brentford)	31
2021–22	Fulham	90	Bournemouth	88	Nottingham Forest	Peterborough United; Derby County; Barnsley	Burnley; Watford; Norwich City	Wigan Athletic; Rotherham United; Sunderland	Aleksandar Mitrović (Fulham)	43
2022–23	Burnley	101	Sheffield United	91	Luton Town	Reading; Blackpool; Wigan Athletic	Leicester City; Leeds United; Southampton	Plymouth Argyle; Ipswich Town; Sheffield Wednesday	Chuba Akpom (Middlesbrough)	28
2023–24	Leicester City	97	Ipswich Town	96	Southampton	Birmingham City; Huddersfield Town; Rotherham United	Luton Town; Burnley; Sheffield United	Portsmouth; Derby County; Oxford United	Sammie Szmodics (Blackburn Rovers)	27
