= David Lee (footballer, born 1967) =

English footballer

Personal information
- Full name: David Mark Lee
- Date of birth: 5 November 1967 (age 59)
- Place of birth: Whitefield, England
- Height: 5 ft 7 in (1.70 m)
- Position: Midfielder

Senior career*
| Years | Team | Apps | (Gls) |
| 1986–1991 | Bury | 208 | (35) |
| 1991–1992 | Southampton | 20 | (0) |
| 1992 | → Bolton Wanderers (loan) | 7 | (3) |
| 1992–1997 | Bolton Wanderers | 148 | (14) |
| 1997–2000 | Wigan Athletic | 83 | (11) |
| 1999 | → Blackpool (loan) | 9 | (1) |
| 2000–2001 | Carlisle United | 13 | (0) |
| 2001 | Morecambe | 12 | (0) |
| Total | | 500 | (64) |

Managerial career
- 2016–2020: Bolton Wanderers Reserves
- * Club domestic league appearances and goals

David Mark Lee (born 5 November 1967 in Whitefield, Lancashire) is an English former professional footballer.

== Playing career ==
Lee, a right winger, began his career with Bury in 1986. In five years at Gigg Lane, he made just over 200 league appearances and scored 35 goals.

Southampton came in for his services in 1991 with a successful £350,000 bid. Lee's stay on the south coast was short-lived, however; after only twenty appearances he returned to the north-west with Bolton Wanderers in a one-month loan deal. In December 1992, Bolton made the move permanent in a £275,000 deal.

Lee remained at Burnden Park for five years, clocking up 147 appearances and scoring sixteen goals. Whilst at Bolton he played in the 1995 League Cup Final.

In 1997, he joined Wigan Athletic for £250,000, and he maintained his goalscoring touch, netting eleven goals during his three years with the Latics. Whilst at Wigan he played in the final as a substitute as they won the 1998–99 Football League Trophy.

Lee joined Blackpool on loan in 1999, before making a permanent move to Carlisle United on a non-contract basis.

A year later, the midfielder joined non-league side Morecambe, with whom he finished his career.

== Coaching ==
After retiring, he turned his hand to coaching and former club Wigan gave him his first opportunity on the ladder by naming him as their youth coach. He stayed in this position until 2007 when accepting the offer to return to Bolton as their Assistant Academy Director. He left his Bolton role after 14 years on 29 January 2021.

== Career statistics ==
Appearances and goals by club, season and competition
| Club | Season | League | | | FA Cup | | League Cup | | Other | | Total | |
| Club | Season | Division | Apps | Goals | Apps | Goals | Apps | Goals | Apps | Goals | Apps | Goals |
|---|---|---|---|---|---|---|---|---|---|---|---|---|
Bury
| Bury | 1985–86 | Third Division | 1 | 0 | 0 | 0 | 0 | 0 | 1 (Note: Appearances in Associate Members' Cup) | 0 | 2 | 0 |
| Bury | 1986–87 | Third Division | 30 | 4 | 0 | 0 | 0 | 0 | 3 | 1 | 33 | 5 |
| Bury | 1987–88 | Third Division | 40 | 3 | 1 | 0 | 6 | 0 | 4 | 1 | 51 | 4 |
| Bury | 1988–89 | Third Division | 45 | 4 | 2 | 0 | 4 | 1 | 2 | 0 | 53 | 5 |
| Bury | 1989–90} | Third Division | 45 | 8 | 2 | 0 | 2 | 0 | 5 (Note: Appearances in Associate Members' Cup (3 appearances, 1 goal) and play-offs (2 appearances)) | 1 | 54 | 9 |
| Bury | 1990–91 | Third Division | 45 | 15 | 1 | 0 | 2 | 0 | 5 (Note: Appearances in Associate Members' Cup (3 appearances) and play-offs (2 appearances, 1 goal)) | 1 | 53 | 16 |
| Bury | 1991–92 | Third Division | 2 | 1 | 0 | 0 | 1 | 0 | — | | 3 | 1 |
| Bury | Total | | 208 | 35 | 6 | 0 | 15 | 1 | 20 | 4 | 249 | 40 |
Southampton
| Southampton | 1991–92 | First Division | 19 | 0 | 1 | 0 | 0 | 0 | 2 (Note: Appearances in Full Members' Cup) | 0 | 22 | 0 |
| Southampton | 1992–93 | Premier League | 1 | 0 | 0 | 0 | 0 | 0 | — | | 1 | 0 |
| Southampton | Total | | 20 | 0 | 1 | 0 | 0 | 0 | 2 | 0 | 23 | 0 |
| Bolton Wanderers (loan) | 1992–93 | Second Division | 7 | 3 | 0 | 0 | 0 | 0 | 2 (Note: Appearances in EFL Trophy) | 0 | 9 | 3 |
Bolton Wanderers
| Bolton Wanderers | 1992–93 | Second Division | 25 | 2 | 4 | 0 | 0 | 0 | 2 | 1 | 31 | 3 |
| Bolton Wanderers | 1993–94 | First Division | 41 | 5 | 7 | 0 | 4 | 0 | 4 (Note: Appearances in Anglo-Italian Cup) | 0 | 56 | 5 |
| Bolton Wanderers | 1994–95 | First Division | 39 | 4 | 1 | 0 | 8 | 2 | 1 (Note: Appearances in play-offs) | 0 | 49 | 6 |
| Bolton Wanderers | 1995–96 | Premier League | 18 | 1 | 1 | 0 | 4 | 0 | — | | 23 | 1 |
| Bolton Wanderers | 1996–97 | First Division | 25 | 2 | 2 | 0 | 4 | 0 | — | | 31 | 2 |
| Bolton Wanderers | Total | | 155 | 17 | 15 | 0 | 20 | 2 | 9 | 1 | 199 | 20 |
Wigan Athletic
| Wigan Athletic | 1997–98 | Second Division | 43 | 5 | 3 | 2 | 2 | 1 | 3 | 0 | 51 | 8 |
| Wigan Athletic | 1998–99 | Second Division | 36 | 6 | 3 | 0 | 4 | 1 | 6 (Note: Appearances in EFL Trophy (4 appearances, 1 goal) and play-offs (2 appearances)) | 1 | 49 | 8 |
| Wigan Athletic | 1999–2000 | Second Division | 4 | 0 | 0 | 0 | 3 | 0 | — | | 7 | 0 |
| Wigan Athletic | Total | | 83 | 11 | 6 | 2 | 9 | 2 | 9 | 1 | 107 | 16 |
| Blackpool (loan) | 1999–2000 | Second Division | 9 | 1 | 2 | 0 | 0 | 0 | 1 | 0 | 12 | 1 |
| Carlisle United | 2000–01 | Third Division | 13 | 0 | 0 | 0 | 2 | 0 | — | | 15 | 0 |
| Morecambe | 2000–01 | Conference Premier | 12 | 0 | 0 | 0 | 0 | 0 | 2 (Note: Appearances in EFL Trophy (1 appearance) and FA Trophy (1 appearance)) | 0 | 14 | 0 |
| Career total | | | 500 | 64 | 30 | 2 | 46 | 5 | 43 | 6 | 619 | 77 |

== Honours ==
Southampton

- Full Members' Cup runner-up: 1991–92

Bolton Wanderers

- Football League First Division: 1996–97
- Football League Cup runner-up: 1994–95

Wigan Athletic

- Football League Trophy: 1998–99

Individual

- PFA Team of the Year: 1989–90 Third Division
