= David Felgate (footballer) =

Welsh footballer (born 1960)

Dave Felgate
Personal information
- Full name: David Wynne Felgate
- Date of birth: 4 March 1960 (age 66)
- Place of birth: Blaenau Ffestiniog, Wales
- Height: 6 ft 2 in (1.88 m)
- Position: Goalkeeper

Youth career
- 1977–1978: Blaenau Ffestiniog

Senior career*
Years	Team	Apps	(Gls)
1978–1980	Bolton Wanderers	0	(0)
1978–1979	→ Rochdale (loan)	35	(0)
1979	→ Crewe Alexandra (loan)	12	(0)
1980	→ Rochdale (loan)	12	(0)
1980–1985	Lincoln City	198	(0)
1984	→ Cardiff City (loan)	4	(0)
1985–1987	Grimsby Town	36	(0)
1987	→ Bolton Wanderers (loan)	15	(0)
1987–1993	Bolton Wanderers	223	(0)
1993	Bury	0	(0)
1993	Wolverhampton Wanderers	0	(0)
1993–1995	Chester City	72	(0)
1995–1996	Wigan Athletic	3	(0)
1996–2002	Leigh RMI	32	(0)
2001–2002	→ Hyde United (loan)	12	(0)
2002–2005	Radcliffe Borough	3	(0)
2004	→ Chorley (loan)	1	(0)
2004–2005	Bacup Borough		
2005–2006	Rossendale United	1	(0)
2006–2007	Manchester City	0	(0)
Total		655	(0)

International career
1983	Wales	1	(0)

Managerial career
- 2005–2006: Rossendale United assistant manager
- 2006–2009: Stockport County goalkeepers coach
- 2017–2018: Chester goalkeepers coach
- * Club domestic league appearances and goals

David Felgate (born 4 March 1960) is a Welsh former professional footballer who played as a goalkeeper. Due to his stature, many supporters affectionately nicknamed him "the fat goalie". Felgate had a long professional career from 1978 to 1995, making a total of 612 Football League appearances. Of the league appearances, 238 came with Bolton Wanderers and he also turned out for league sides Rochdale, Crewe Alexandra, Lincoln City, Grimsby Town, Cardiff City, Chester City, and Wigan Athletic.

He also had spells with Bury and Wolverhampton Wanderers without making any league appearances for these clubs, and Felgate later continued to play non-league football for clubs including Leigh RMI, Hyde United, and Bacup Borough until he was in his mid-40s.

Felgate is perhaps best known for his performance in net for Leigh RMI against Fulham in the 1998–99 FA Cup at Craven Cottage. Non-league Leigh achieved a 1–1 draw against the southwest London side, and thereby attention of the British media. In particular, Felgate, who was then 38 years old, received widespread plaudits for his performance in the match, which prompted then-Fulham boss Kevin Keegan to declare that Felgate's goalkeeping was "the best I've ever seen at any level."

Felgate won a solitary full Welsh international cap in 1983, having earlier played for his nation's schoolboys team. The keeper came on as a substitution for the legendary Neville Southall in a friendly against Romania. Felgate would have had an additional international cap had Wales's scheduled match against Northern Ireland two years earlier in 1981 not been cancelled to Bobby Sands's hunger strike.

After his retirement from playing, Felgate first acted as Manchester City's academy goalkeeping coach and later became the assistant manager for the semi-professional Rossendale United club. He was then employed by Stockport County as first team goalkeeping coach in League One.

In January 2009 he left Stockport County to rejoin Manchester City as their academy goalkeeping coach.

== Honours ==
Lincoln City

- Football League Group Cup runner-up: 1982–83

Bolton Wanderers

- Associate Members' Cup: 1988–89

Leigh RMI

- Northern Premier League Premier Division: 1999–2000
- Peter Swales Challenge Shield: 1999–2000
