= Neil Fisher =

English footballer (born 1970)

Personal information
- Full name: Neil John Fisher
- Date of birth: 7 November 1970 (age 55)
- Place of birth: St. Helens, Merseyside, England
- Position: Striker

Team information
- Current team: Farnworth Griffin F.C.

Youth career
- 1987–1989: Bolton Wanderers

Senior career*
Years	Team	Apps	(Gls)
1989–1995	Bolton Wanderers	24	(1)
1995–1998	Chester City	108	(4)
1998–1999	Bangor City	10	(0)
1999	Connah's Quay Nomads	7	(0)
1999–2001	Chester City	77	(5)
2001–2003	Leigh RMI	45	(3)
2003	Hyde United	3	(0)
2004	Speke Town		
2005–	Bala Town		
2018–	Farnworth Griffin		
- * Club domestic league appearances and goals

Neil Fisher (born 7 November 1970 in St Helens, Merseyside) is an English professional footballer who mainly plays as a striker. He played in The Football League for Bolton Wanderers and Chester City, as well as for non-league clubs in both England and Wales.

== Playing career ==
Fisher joined Bolton Wanderers as an apprentice in 1987, two years before he signed professional forms with the club. He had to wait until August 1991 for his first-team debut in a Football League Cup tie with York City and he was to struggle to ever establish himself with Wanderers. His most prominent season was 1994–95 when he played in 11 league games, but he was not included in the matchday squad as Bolton played at Wembley Stadium in the final of the League Cup and the Division One play-off final.

In June 1995 Fisher moved to Division Three side Chester City on a free transfer. He was to enjoy his first taste of regular first-team action with the Blues, missing just two league games in 1995–96. He made his debut in the opening day 2–0 win over Hartlepool United on 12 August 1995, with his first goal arriving in a 5–1 win against Lincoln City the following month.

Despite playing regularly in the closing stages of the 1997–98 season, Fisher was released at the end of the season and dropped into the League of Wales with Bangor City. He quickly moved to Connah's Quay Nomads before making a surprise return to Chester in March 1999 on a non-contract basis.

Fisher remained with Chester for the next two years playing in midfield or at full back, featuring prominently in both the 1999–2000 relegation season from Division Three and the club's first season in the Football Conference. His final game for the club was in the final of the Conference League Cup against Kingstonian on 7 May 2001, as he helped Chester to a victory on penalties after a goalless draw. It was announced on 13 June 2001 he would not be offered a new contract by Chester.

Fisher remained in the Conference with Leigh RMI until January 2003 when he joined Hyde United for a short spell.

He then went on to join Speke Town before joining Bala Town F.C.
