= John McGinlay =

Scottish footballer

Personal information
- Full name: John McGinlay
- Date of birth: 8 April 1964 (age 62)
- Place of birth: Inverness, Scotland
- Height: 1.75 m (5 ft 9 in)
- Position: Striker

Team information
- Current team: Bolton Wanderers (Club Ambassador)

Youth career
- 1978–1980: Fort William

Senior career*
Years	Team	Apps	(Gls)
1980–1982	Fort William		
1982–1983	Nairn County		
1983–1984	North Shore United	24	(10)
1984–1985	Nairn County		
1985–1988	Yeovil Town		
1988–1989	Elgin City		
1989–1990	Shrewsbury Town	60	(27)
1990–1991	Bury	25	(9)
1991	→ Millwall (loan)	2	(0)
1991–1992	Millwall	32	(10)
1992–1997	Bolton Wanderers	192	(87)
1997–1998	Bradford City	17	(3)
1998–1999	Oldham Athletic	7	(1)
2000	Cincinnati Riverhawks	7	(5)
2001–2002	Gresley Rovers		
2005–2006	Cincinnati Kings	4	(1)
Total		370	(153)

International career
1994–1997	Scotland	13	(4)
1994–1997	Scotland B	1	(0)

Managerial career
- 2001–2002: Gresley Rovers
- 2002: Ilkeston Town
- * Club domestic league appearances and goals

John McGinlay (born 8 April 1964) is a Scottish football manager, scout and former professional player who is the club ambassador of Bolton Wanderers.

As a player, he was a striker over a 26-year career that saw him notably play in the Premier League for Bolton Wanderers. He also played in the Football League for Shrewsbury Town, Bury, Millwall, Bradford City and Oldham Athletic. He also played non-league football in both Scotland and England for Fort William, Nairn County, Elgin City and Yeovil Town, as well as a spell in New Zealand with North Shore United, and in the United States with Cincinnati Riverhawks and Cincinnati Kings. He was capped 13 times by Scotland, scoring four goals.

Following his retirement, McGinlay had brief spells as manager of both Gresley Rovers and Ilkeston Town. He also returned to the USA as director of coaching for Cincinnati Kings. He later had spells as a scout for the Scottish Football Association, Wigan Athletic, Blackpool and Blackburn Rovers.

== Club career ==
=== Early years ===
A supporter of Celtic in childhood, McGinlay's first senior game was as a 16-year-old for his hometown club Fort William, in a Highland Football League game in August 1980 against Elgin City. Following a year playing in New Zealand either side of two seasons with Nairn County, and a three-year spell with English Football Conference club Yeovil Town, McGinlay returned to the Highland League with Elgin City in 1988.

He then progressed through English League football, initially playing with Shrewsbury Town then with Bury. After a successful loan spell with Millwall, in which he scored during their unsuccessful participation in the 1991 Football League play-offs, McGinlay moved to The Den permanently for the 1991–92 season. He scored 27 goals in 52 league matches for the London club.

=== Bolton Wanderers ===
McGinlay is perhaps best known for his five-year spell with Bolton Wanderers between 1992 and 1997, where his scoring exploits led to him being nicknamed 'Super John'. After his goals eliminated FA Cup holders Liverpool from the competition, he successfully partnered fellow Scot Andy Walker as the Trotters gained promotion from the third tier in 1993, with McGinlay scoring the match-winning penalty in the last fixture against local rivals Preston North End.

Further cup 'giant killings' over teams such as Everton and Arsenal followed the next year, with McGinlay featuring prominently – he scored 33 goals across all competitions during the campaign, and the team became known in local media as 'white hot' due to the performances. In 1995, he was in the side which gained promotion to the Premier League via the play-offs, playing all 120 minutes of the dramatic 4–3 victory over Reading (they were relegated in the subsequent campaign), and also started in the League Cup Final (lost 2–1 to Liverpool) in the same season.

In April 1997, he scored the last goals at Burnden Park, finishing as the club and the division's top scorer with 24 goals from 43 games as Bolton returned to the top level, this time as champions. He scored a hat-trick in a 6–1 cup win over Tottenham Hotspur. He made seven further league appearances for the club at the outset of the next season before joining second-tier Bradford City in November 1997 for £625,000 in what would be an injury-hit move. He later had the Bolton club crest tattooed on his arm.

=== Later years ===
McGinlay had short spells with Oldham Athletic and American team Cincinnati Riverhawks before moving into management with non-league sides Ilkeston Town and Gresley Rovers. In 2013, he was also employed as a chief scout by Wigan Athletic, appointed by former Bolton teammate Owen Coyle during his spell as manager, after spending time working in similar roles in the US with Cincinnati Kings (where he had also finished his playing career after serving as a manager), and with the Scottish Football Association. In 2014, McGinlay took over the 240-year old Horwich pub the Original Bay Horse. He rejoined Bolton Wanderers in an official ambassadorial role in 2020, in an attempt by the club to strengthen their ties with the sports courses held at the University of Bolton, and to bring former players back into contact with the club. On 14 November 2021, McGinlay played in a charity match as part of a team of Bolton Wanderers Legends against the current Bolton first team with the match helping to raise money for the mother of Bolton player Gethin Jones, who had been diagnosed with Motor neuron disease. The Bolton first team won 7–4, with McGinlay scoring a penalty for the Legends team. He also provides commentary for Bolton Wanderers matches on Bolton FM.

== International career ==
During his time with Bolton, McGinlay earned 13 international caps for Scotland, scoring four goals; his last and most important strike was the only goal of a 1–0 victory over Sweden (which featured a memorable goalkeeping display by Jim Leighton) and helped the national side qualify for 1998 FIFA World Cup, although he did not make the squad for that tournament, nor for the Euro 96 competition. McGinlay lined up for Scotland alongside his childhood friend from Fort William, Duncan Shearer, who also spent much of his career in England – the two never played in the same team at club level. He also featured in the infamous '3-second match' in Estonia and its replay in Monaco, and missed the birth of his daughter in order to travel to Belarus for another qualification game the following year.

== Coaching career ==
Following retirement, McGinlay had brief spells as manager of both Gresley Rovers and Ilkeston Town. He also returned to the USA as director of coaching for Cincinnati Kings. He later had spells as a scout for the Scottish Football Association, Wigan Athletic, Blackpool and Blackburn Rovers.

== Career statistics ==
=== International ===
Appearances and goals by national team and year
National team	Year	Apps	Goals
Scotland	1994	5	2
Scotland	1995	4	1
Scotland	1996	1	1
Scotland	1997	3	0
Total		13	4

Scores and results list Scotland's goal tally first, score column indicates score after each McGinlay goal.

List of international goals scored by John McGinlay
No.	Date	Venue	Opponent	Score	Result	Competition	Ref.
1	20 April 1994	Ernst-Happel-Stadion, Vienna, Austria	Austria	1–1	2–1	Friendly	
2	12 October 1994	Hampden Park, Glasgow, Scotland	Faroe Islands	1–0	5–1	UEFA Euro 1996 qualifying	
3	7 June 1995	Svangaskarð, Toftir, Faroe Islands	Faroe Islands	2–0	2–0	UEFA Euro 1996 qualifying	
4	10 November 1996	Ibrox Stadium, Glasgow, Scotland	Sweden	1–0	1–0	1998 FIFA World Cup qualification	

== Honours ==
Bolton Wanderers

- Football League First Division: 1996–97; play-offs: 1995
- Football League Second Division second-place promotion: 1992–93
- Football League Cup runner-up: 1994–95

Individual

- PFA Team of the Year: 1996–97 First Division
