= Julian Darby =

English footballer

Personal information
- Full name: Julian Timothy Darby
- Date of birth: 3 October 1967 (age 59)
- Place of birth: Farnworth, Lancashire, England
- Positions: Defender; midfielder

Team information
- Current team: Bolton Wanderers

Senior career*
Years	Team	Apps	(Gls)
1986–1993	Bolton Wanderers	270	(36)
1993–1995	Coventry City	55	(5)
1995–1997	West Bromwich Albion	39	(1)
1997–2000	Preston North End	36	(1)
1998	→ Rotherham United (loan)	3	(0)
2000–2001	Carlisle United	18	(1)
Total		421	(44)

Managerial career
- 2016–2019: Bolton Wanderers U16s
- 2020–2022: Bolton Wanderers U16s
- 2022–2026: Bolton Wanderers U18s
- 2025: Bolton Wanderers (joint caretaker)
- 2026–: Bolton Wanderers U21s
- * Club domestic league appearances and goals

Julian Timothy Darby (born 3 October 1967) is an English football coach and former professional footballer who is the under-21s Manager of Bolton Wanderers.

As a player he was a defender and midfielder from 1986 until 2001, notably in the Premier League for Coventry City and prior to that a large stint with Bolton Wanderers. He also played in the Football League for West Bromwich Albion, Preston North End, Rotherham United and Carlisle United.

Following retirement he began a coaching career and has been part of the coaching staff at Nottingham Forest, Derby County, Leeds United, Bolton Wanderers and Preston North End.

== Playing career ==
He played for Bolton Wanderers from 1986 to 1993, scoring 36 goals in 270 league appearances. He scored in the 1989 Associate Members Cup final, with Bolton beating Torquay United 4–1 at Wembley Stadium, in a side captained by future Derby boss Phil Brown. He subsequently joined Coventry City in 1993 but after 50+ games for them was transferred to West Bromwich Albion on 16 November 1995, making his debut for them shortly afterwards against Sunderland. In 1997, he moved to Preston North End, and following a loan spell at Rotherham United he transferred to Carlisle United in 2000 before retiring as a player in 2001.

== Coaching career ==
He started his coaching career at Preston and became first-team coach. He joined Billy Davies as first-team coach at Derby County in 2006.

In January 2009 he again joined up with Davies when he was appointed first team coach at Nottingham Forest. He left in June 2011 following the departure of Davies from the club and the appointment of his successor Steve McLaren.

In 2012, he returned to Bolton as U16 coach at the club's youth academy he assisted Jimmy Phillips during his brief stint as caretaker manager following Owen Coyle's sacking in October 2012.

On 7 February 2013, he returned to Nottingham Forest as first team coach to Billy Davies. Darby left the club after Fawaz Al-Hasawi brought an end to Davies' reign as manager at the club on 24 March 2014. On 20 November 2014, Darby settled with Forest out of court over an unpaid bonus case.

On 2 July 2015, it was announced that Darby had joined Uwe Rosler's backroom staff at Leeds United as first team coach.

In August 2017, it was confirmed that Darby had taken on a full-time role at the Bolton Wanderers academy, having spent the previous season coaching the U-16 team.

Upon the departure of Keith Hill as Bolton manager in the summer of 2020, Darby reverted to his old role with the club's academy. In May 2022, he was promoted from U16s Manager to U18s Manager. On 22 January 2025, after manager Ian Evatt left the club by mutual consent; Darby, Andy Taylor, and Andrew Tutte were named as joint caretaker managers. Their first game in charge was a 1–0 away win against Huddersfield Town, ending Huddersfield's 16-match unbeaten run. They took charge of one more match, a 3–1 home win against Northampton Town, before Steven Schumacher was hired as Evatt's replacement on 30 January. They returned to their youth/B team roles with a 100% winning record as caretakers. Darby's U18 team won a Treble in the 2024–25 season; winning the EFL Youth Alliance North, the EFL Youth Alliance National, and the LFA Professional Youth Cup. He was promoted to U21s Manager in June 2026.

== Honours ==
=== Player ===
Bolton Wanderers

- Football League Fourth Division third-place promotion: 1987–88
- Associate Members' Cup: 1988–89

=== Manager ===
Bolton Wanderers U18

- EFL Youth Alliance National: 2024–25
- EFL Youth Alliance North: 2024–25
- LFA Professional Youth Cup: 2024–25
