= Dave Reeves =

English footballer and manager (born 1967)

David Reeves
Personal information
- Full name: David Reeves
- Date of birth: 19 November 1967 (age 58)
- Place of birth: Birkenhead, England
- Height: 6 ft 1 in (1.85 m)
- Position: Forward

Senior career*
Years	Team	Apps	(Gls)
1986–1989	Sheffield Wednesday	17	(2)
1986	→ Scunthorpe United (loan)	4	(2)
1987	→ Scunthorpe United (loan)	6	(4)
1987	→ Burnley (loan)	16	(8)
1989–1993	Bolton Wanderers	134	(46)
1993	Notts County	13	(6)
1993–1996	Carlisle United	127	(47)
1996–1997	Preston North End	47	(33)
1997–2002	Chesterfield	168	(46)
2001–2002	→ Oldham Athletic (loan)	3	(0)
2002	Oldham Athletic	10	(3)
2002	→ Chesterfield (loan)	16	(25)
2002–2004	Chesterfield	55	(11)
2004–2005	Ards		(2)
2005	Scarborough	10	(4)
2005–2008	Gainsborough Trinity		
Total		616	(217)

Managerial career
- 2007–2009: Gainsborough Trinity (assistant manager)
- 2009: Gainsborough Trinity (caretaker)
- * Club domestic league appearances and goals

David Reeves (born 19 November 1967) is an English former professional footballer who played as a forward from 1986 to 2009.

He played in the Football League for many clubs, including making more than 100 appearances for each of Chesterfield, Bolton Wanderers and Carlisle United. He briefly held the assistant manager's position at Gainsborough Trinity prior to retiring from playing.

== Playing career ==
Reeves was drafted into the first team squad at Sheffield Wednesday in 1986 aged 18. He played just under 20 first team games for The Owls while at the club between 1986 and 1989 and while at Hillsborough he spent time on loan with Scunthorpe United.

He transferred to non-league side Heswall, where he stayed for one season, while there he re-joined Scunthorpe on loan and also spent time at Turf Moor with Burnley before joining Bolton Wanderers in 1989 for £80,000. Reeves stayed at Burnden Park until 1993 when he moved briefly to Notts County before a move to Carlisle United. Reeves went on to play for Preston North End, Chesterfield, Oldham Athletic and Scarborough before ending his career playing for Gainsborough Trinity.

== Coaching career ==
Upon retiring from the game Reeves took up a position on the coaching staff at former club Gainsborough Trinity. He later took up the position of Assistant Manager. Reeves remained the club's Assistant Manager until late August 2009. Following the dismissal of manager Steve Charles, Reeves and coach Steve Blatherwick were given temporary charge of first team affairs in a caretaker role. But after one game in charge, Reeves and Blatherwick departed the club.

== Personal life ==
His twin brother Alan was also a professional footballer, most notably with Rochdale, Wimbledon and Swindon Town. Dave was encouraged by his auntie Mary Burgess and uncle David Burgess to keep his football up from the young age of seven when they placed him in a local football club. He is married to Julie and has a daughter Jessica.

== Honours ==
Carlisle United

- Football League Third Division: 1994–95
- Football League Trophy runner-up: 1994–95

Individual

- PFA Team of the Year: 1993–94 Third Division, 1994–95 Third Division
