= Nicky Spooner =

English footballer

Personal information
- Full name: Nicholas Michael Spooner
- Date of birth: 5 June 1971 (age 55)
- Place of birth: Manchester, England
- Height: 5 ft 10 in (1.78 m)
- Positions: Right-back; midfielder

Youth career
- 1987–1989: Bolton Wanderers

Senior career*
| Years | Team | Apps | (Gls) |
| 1989–1999 | Bolton Wanderers | 23 | (1) |
| 1998 | → Oldham Athletic (loan) | 2 | (0) |
| 1999–2000 | Charleston Battery | 56 | (1) |
| 1999–2000 | → Chester City (loan) | 9 | (0) |
| 2000–2002 | Leigh RMI | 47 | (0) |
| 2002–2003 | Radcliffe Borough | 24 | (0) |
| 2003 | Hyde United | 11 | (0) |
| Total | | 172 | (2) |

Managerial career
- 2022–2025: Hyde United
- * Club domestic league appearances and goals

Nicholas Michael Spooner (born 5 June 1971) is an English football coach and former professional footballer.

As a player, he was a defender and midfielder who notably played in the Premier League for Bolton Wanderers. He also played in the Football League with Oldham Athletic and Chester City, in the United States with Charleston Battery and in non-league with Leigh RMI, Radcliffe Borough and Hyde United.

== Playing career ==
Born in Manchester, Spooner played for Bolton Wanderers, Oldham Athletic, Charleston Battery, Chester City and Leigh RMI.

He joined Bolton Wanderers in 1987 after signing YTS forms. His senior career with the club was marred by injury. In October 1994 he suffered a broken leg in a match against Burnley following a tackle by John Gayle, and he never played first-team football for the club again. He finally left Bolton in 1999 and moved to the United States, spending a year with Charleston Battery before returning to England to play non-league football for the final years of his playing career, with Leigh RMI, Radcliffe Borough, and Hyde United in 2003.

== Coaching career ==
Spooner returned to Bolton Wanderers as a youth coach and initially coached the under-8s' team. In November 2011, Spooner was working as the under-16 coach, and in January 2013 he was the club's Head of Youth Development. In September 2016, he was promoted to under-18s' head coach. He left Bolton on 29 January 2021 after 17 years in his coaching roles.

On 8 June 2021, he was appointed as the new Youth Team Coach at FC Halifax Town.

In February 2022, he was appointed as the new manager of Hyde United, replacing former Stockport County and Port Vale manager Jim Gannon. He resigned on 8 September 2025.

== Managerial statistics ==
As of 2 March 2024

Managerial record by team and tenure
| Team | From | To | Record | | | | | Ref. |
| Team | From | To | G | W | D | L | Win % | Ref. |
|---|---|---|---|---|---|---|---|---|
| Hyde United | 18 February 2022 | 8 September 2025 | 104 | 50 | 22 | 32 | 48.08 | |
| Total | | | 104 | 50 | 22 | 32 | 48.08 | — |
