= Mark Seagraves =

English footballer (born 1966)

Personal information
- Date of birth: 22 October 1966 (age 60)
- Place of birth: Bootle, England
- Height: 6 ft 0 in (1.83 m)
- Position: Defender

Senior career*
Years	Team	Apps	(Gls)
1983–1987	Liverpool	0	(0)
1986	→ Norwich City (loan)	3	(0)
1987–1990	Manchester City	42	(0)
1990–1995	Bolton Wanderers	157	(7)
1995–1998	Swindon Town	61	(0)
1998–1999	Barrow		
Total		263	(7)

International career
1984	England Youth	4	(1)
- * Club domestic league appearances and goals

Mark Seagraves (born 22 October 1966) is an English former professional footballer who played as a defender for Liverpool, Norwich City, Manchester City, Bolton Wanderers and Swindon Town.

== Career ==
Seagraves was born in Bootle. He began his playing career with Liverpool. He came through their youth system and won England Youth caps. However, he was unable to break into Liverpool's first team. He made two appearances for the club, both in cup matches. His debut came in the first leg of the 1985–86 League Cup semi-finals, against Queen's Park Rangers, when he deputised for the injured Gary Gillespie. He made one further appearance in an FA Cup tie against York City, but after Gillespie recovered, Seagraves never again featured in the Liverpool team. He spent a short spell on loan at Norwich City F.C. during the 1986–87 season and made three appearances for The Canaries.

Early in the 1987–88 season, Mel Machin signed Seagraves for Manchester City, then in the Second Division, for a transfer fee of £100,000. He made his debut the following Saturday, when he came on as a substitute for Paul Lake in a 2–0 home defeat at the hands of Leeds United. He made 14 starts in the 1987–88 season, mostly deputising for Kenny Clements. He was the first-choice right back in the first half of the 1988–89 season, in which City gained promotion to the First Division, but his season was ended in February by a cracked vertebra. His first team opportunities were limited the following season. A brief opportunity arrived after Machin was sacked in November 1989. Still, Seagraves made just two appearances before new manager Howard Kendall brought in Alan Harper as a new right-back. His final Manchester City appearance came on 9 December 1989 against Southampton. In September 1990 he was transferred to Bolton Wanderers for £100,000.

Whilst at Bolton Seagraves played in the 1995 Football League Cup Final. Seagraves went on to play for Swindon Town before moving into non-league football. He was appointed to his coaching position at Wigan in the summer of 2006. His manager at Wigan – Paul Jewell – was a teammate of Seagraves in the Liverpool FC youth team. In November 2007 he left Wigan to join Jewell at his new club Derby County. On Monday 29 December 2008, Seagraves left his position as coach at Derby County after the resignation of Paul Jewell.

He linked up with Jewell for a fourth time when agreeing to become a scout for Ipswich Town in November 2011.

In May 2013 Seagraves began working in Delhi India, for a company called "India On Track" in conjunction with Arsenal Soccer Schools. He is working to create a structure within the Soccer Schools that will be sustainable and will ensure the future development of football and football players within India.

== Post-playing career ==
After his retirement from playing Seagraves ran Football Faktory, a football school for children in India.

== Honours ==
Bolton Wanderers

- Football League Cup runner-up: 1994–95

Swindon Town

- Football League Second Division: 1995–96
