= Andy Walker (footballer, born 1965) =

Scottish footballer

Personal information
- Full name: Andrew Francis Walker
- Date of birth: 6 April 1965 (age 61)
- Place of birth: Glasgow, Scotland
- Height: 1.73 m (5 ft 8 in)
- Position: Striker

Youth career
- Cathkin United
- EK YM
- Baillieston

Senior career*
Years	Team	Apps	(Gls)
1984–1987	Motherwell	77	(17)
1987–1991	Celtic	108	(30)
1991	→ Newcastle United (loan)	2	(0)
1991–1994	Bolton Wanderers	67	(44)
1994–1996	Celtic	42	(9)
1996–1998	Sheffield United	52	(20)
1998	→ Hibernian (loan)	8	(3)
1998	→ Raith Rovers (loan)	7	(2)
1998–1999	Ayr United	33	(15)
1999	Carlisle United	3	(0)
1999	Partick Thistle	4	(0)
1999	Kilwinning Rangers		
1999	Isernia		
2000	Alloa Athletic	8	(3)

International career
1987	Scotland U21	1	(1)
1988–1994	Scotland	3	(0)
- * Club domestic league appearances and goals

Andrew Francis Walker (born 6 April 1965) is a Scottish former professional footballer, who played as a striker for several clubs in Scotland and England, including Motherwell, Celtic, Bolton Wanderers, Sheffield United, and Ayr United. He also made three full international appearances for Scotland. Since retiring as a player, Walker has become a television pundit and co-commentator.

== Playing career ==
Walker was born in Glasgow. He started his professional career with Motherwell in 1984, helping the club to gain promotion before moving to Celtic in the summer of 1987 for a fee of £350,000. His first season at Celtic Park was hugely successful, as the Bhoys won the double in 1987–88, their centenary season, and Walker himself earned a first Scotland cap against Colombia. The following three seasons were less fruitful however and by 1991–92 Walker was out of the first team picture.

After loan spells with Newcastle United and Bolton Wanderers, he joined the Burnden Park side permanently in 1992. At Bolton, Walker returned to his form of 1988, establishing a prolific partnership with John McGinlay as the Lancashire side earned promotion to the First Division in 1992–93. That same season, he famously scored at Anfield to help the Trotters knock holders Liverpool out of the FA Cup. Walker continued in the same vein the following season until sustaining a serious knee injury against Swansea City.

Upon his recovery, Walker was the subject of a surprise bid from Celtic and he returned to Glasgow in 1994. 1994–95 was a mixed season for Walker. On the positive side, he won a Scotland recall and earned his third (and last) cap in October, while his Celtic side won the Scottish Cup in May 1995. In between these events though were the negatives, as the Hoops struggled in the League and suffered a shock defeat by Raith Rovers in the League Cup final. Due to the arrival of Andreas Thom in the summer of 1995, Walker was again deemed surplus to requirements at Parkhead and joined Sheffield United for £500,000 in early 1996. Walker's time in the Steel City was relatively productive; his goals tally a respectable 24.

Nevertheless, Walker was again to quickly fall from favour, and after brief loan spells at Hibernian (where he scored in an Edinburgh Derby), and Raith Rovers in 1998, he ended his career in the lower leagues. This period encompassed short spells with Ayr United (scoring in the Ayrshire derby against former Celtic teammate Gordon Marshall), Carlisle United, Partick Thistle, and Alloa Athletic.

== Media career ==
Since his playing retirement, Walker has worked as a pundit for STV on their Scotsport highlights programme, which he became the main presenter of, alongside Grant Stott, due to Jim Delahunt's departure. The programme was axed in May 2008, due to increasing competition from BBC Scotland's Sportscene. Walker is also writing a column for the Glasgow-based Sunday Mail newspaper.

In 2007/08, Walker began presenting STV's coverage of the UEFA Champions League, as well the station's UEFA Cup matches, taking over from Jim White.

Walker now regularly features on Sky Sports as a co-commentator for Scottish Premiership and Cup games. During the 2015–16 season, Celtic captain Scott Brown criticised Walker, labelling him a "poor man's Gary Neville" in May 2016.

In 2021, Walker was prohibited from entering both Ibrox Stadium and Celtic Park after he commented live on-air about Rangers' finances and criticized Celtic's decision to send their squad to Dubai for a winter training camp, which resulted in two players testing positive for COVID-19 and others being forced into self-isolation.

== Career statistics ==
Appearances and goals by club, season and competition
Club	Season	League		National cup (Note: Includes Scottish Cup and FA Cup.)		League cup (Note: Includes Scottish League Cup and Football League Cup.)		Other (Note: Includes European Cup, UEFA Cup, European Cup Winners Cup, Dubai Champions Cup, Football League play-offs.)		Total	
Club	Season	Apps	Goals	Apps	Goals	Apps	Goals	Apps	Goals	Apps	Goals
Motherwell	1984–85	12	3	10	2	6	1	–			
Motherwell	1985–86	22	4	10	2	6	1	–			
Motherwell	1986–87	43	10	10	2	6	1	–			
Motherwell	Total	77	17	10	2	6	1	–		93	20
Celtic	1987–88	42	26	4	2	3	3	2 (Note: 2 appearances & 1 goal in the UEFA Cup.)	1	51	32
Celtic	1988–89	22	8	2	2	3	4	4 (Note: 3 appearances & 1 goal in the Europea Cup. 1 appearance in the Dubai Champions Cup.)	1	31	15
Celtic	1989–90	32	6	5	2	4	1	2 (Note: 2 appearances & 1 goal in the European Cup Winners Cup.)	1	43	10
Celtic	1990–91	11	0	–		4	0	–		15	0
Celtic	1991–92	1	0	–		1	0	–		2	0
Celtic	Total	108	40	11	6	15	8	8	3	142	57
Newcastle United (loan)	1991–92	2	0	0	0	1	0	–		3	0
Bolton Wanderers	1991–92	24	15					–			
Bolton Wanderers	1992–93	32	26					–			
Bolton Wanderers	1993–94	11	3					–			
Bolton Wanderers	Total	67	44								
Celtic	1994–95	26	6	4	0	5	2	–		35	8
Celtic	1995–96	16	3	1	0	2	0	3 (Note: 3 appearances & 1 goal in the European Cup Winners Cup.)	1	21	4
Celtic	Total	42	9	5	0	7	2	3	1	56	12
Sheffield United	1995–96	14	8	–		–		–		14	8
Sheffield United	1996–97	37	12	1	0	2	2	2 (Note: 2 appearances & 1 goal in the FL First Division play-offs.)	1	42	15
Sheffield United	1997–98	1	0	–		0	0	–		1	0
Sheffield United	Total	52	20	1	0	2	2	2	1	57	23
Hibernian (loan)	1997–98	8	3	1	0	–		–		9	3
Raith Rovers (loan)	1997–98	7	2	–		–		–		7	2
Ayr United	1998–99	33	15	4	3	3	1	–		40	19
Carlisle United	1999–2000	3	0	–		2	0	–		5	0
Partick Thistle	1999–2000	4	0	–				–			
Alloa Athletic	1999–2000	8	3	5	0	–		–		13	3
Career Total		415	153								

== Honours ==
Individual

- PFA Team of the Year: 1992–93 Second Division
