= Scott Green (footballer) =

English footballer and manager

Personal information
- Full name: Scott Paul Green
- Date of birth: 15 January 1970 (age 56)
- Place of birth: Walsall, England
- Position: Defender

Team information
- Current team: Pallo-Iirot (manager)

Senior career*
Years	Team	Apps	(Gls)
1986–1990	Derby County	0	(0)
1989	→ Euran Pallo (loan)	17	(23)
1990–1997	Bolton Wanderers	257	(25)
1997–2003	Wigan Athletic	213	(10)
2003	Wrexham	15	(3)
2003–2004	Telford United	20	(3)
2004–2005	Wrexham	12	(0)
2005–2006	Ashton United		
Total		534	(64)

Managerial career
- 2006–2008: Ashton United
- 2018–: Pallo-Iirot
- * Club domestic league appearances and goals

Scott Paul Green (born 15 January 1970) is an English football manager and former professional footballer who is the manager of Finnish club Pallo-Iirot.

As a player, he was a defender who notably played in the Premier League for Bolton Wanderers. He also played in the Football League with Wigan Athletic and Wrexham as well as non-league sides Telford United and Ashton United.

Following retirement, Green managed Ashton United before having spells as a youth coach at both Yeovil Town and Portsmouth.

== Playing career ==
As a schoolboy, Green spent time at Walsall, West Brom and Wolverhampton Wanderers before Derby County took him on trial as a centre-forward where he would do two year apprenticeship and two-year professional. He ultimately failed to play a single game for Derby but would have a successful loan spell in 1989 with Finnish side Euran Pallo, scoring 23 goals in 17 matches. In 1990, Green signed for Bolton Wanderers for £50,000, making his début against Shrewsbury Town. scoring his first goal against Bristol City at Burnden Park. He would help Wanderers reach the play-offs that season, and made an appearance in the 1991 play-off final at Wembley against Tranmere. In 1993 Green would help Bolton Secure Promotion to the First Division by beating Preston North End on the final day of the season 1–0 at Burnden Park to secure automatic promotion. In 1994, Green switched to full-back helping Bolton achieve promotion to the Premier League and also played in the 1995 Football League Cup Final against Liverpool.

Green joined Wigan Athletic for £300,000 in June 1997, scoring on his début in a 5–2 win over Wycombe Wanderers on the opening day of the 1997/98 season. Now a regular fixture at right-back, he was part of the side that would win the Football League Trophy at Wembley in 1999 as an unused substitute. A virtual ever present in the first half of Wigan's First Division Championship winning season, he would be allowed to leave the club for Wrexham in 2003 where Green would also play a big part in gaining promotion with Wrexham to Division one. Green's second spell at Wrexham in 2005 would see him gain another medal in the Johnstone's Paint Trophy at the Millennium Stadium.

== Coaching career ==
Green's first managerial job came in charge of Ashton United where he spent 18 months in charge from 2006 to 2007. On 15 October 2018, Green was appointed as manager of Finnish club Pallo-Iirot after spells at Preston North End Yeovil Town and Portsmouth.

== Honours ==
Bolton Wanderers

- Football League First Division: 1996–97; play-offs: 1995
- Football League Second Division second-place promotion: 1992–93
- Football League Cup runner-up: 1994–95

Wigan Athletic

- Football League Second Division: 2002–03
- Football League Trophy: 1998–99

Wrexham

- Football League Third Division third-place promotion: 2002–03
