= 1994–95 Football League Cup =

League Cup, Coca-Cola Cup
- The Coca-Cola Cup

Tournament details
- Country: England; Wales
- Teams: 92

Final positions
- Champions: Liverpool (5th title)
- Runners-up: Bolton Wanderers

Tournament statistics
- Top goal scorer(s): Jan Age Fjortoft (Swindon Town) (9 goals)

The 1994–95 Football League Cup (known as the Coca-Cola Cup for sponsorship reasons) was the 35th Football League Cup, a knockout competition for England's top 92 football clubs.

Liverpool won the competition, beating Bolton Wanderers 2–1 in the final at Wembley.

== First round ==
56 of the First, Second and Third Division clubs compete from the First Round. Each section is divided equally into a pot of seeded clubs and a pot of unseeded clubs. Clubs' rankings depend upon their finishing position in the 1993–94 season.

=== First leg ===
Home team	Score	Away team	Date
Barnet	4–0	Leyton Orient	15 August 1994
Blackpool	1–2	Chesterfield	16 August 1994
Bournemouth	2–0	Northampton Town	16 August 1994
Bradford City	2–1	Grimsby Town	16 August 1994
Brighton & Hove Albion	2–1	Wycombe Wanderers	17 August 1994
Bristol Rovers	1–3	Port Vale	17 August 1994
Burnley	1–0	York City	18 August 1994
Bury	2–0	Hartlepool United	16 August 1994
Cardiff City	1–0	Torquay United	16 August 1994
Colchester United	0–2	Brentford	16 August 1994
Crewe Alexandra	2–1	Wigan Athletic	16 August 1994
Darlington	2–2	Barnsley	17 August 1994
Doncaster Rovers	2–4	Wrexham	15 August 1994
Exeter City	2–2	Swansea City	17 August 1994
Gillingham	0–1	Reading	16 August 1994
Hereford United	0–0	West Bromwich Albion	16 August 1994
Hull City	2–1	Scarborough	16 August 1994
Lincoln City	2–0	Chester City	16 August 1994
Luton Town	1–1	Fulham	16 August 1994
Oxford United	3–1	Peterborough United	16 August 1994
Portsmouth	2–0	Cambridge United	17 August 1994
Preston North End	1–1	Stockport County	17 August 1994
Rochdale	1–2	Mansfield Town	16 August 1994
Rotherham United	1–0	Carlisle United	16 August 1994
Scunthorpe United	2–1	Huddersfield Town	16 August 1994
Shrewsbury Town	2–1	Birmingham City	16 August 1994
Southend United	0–0	Watford	16 August 1994
Walsall	4–0	Plymouth Argyle	16 August 1994

=== Second leg ===
Home team	Score	Away team	Date	Agg
Barnsley	0–0 (Note: After extra time.) (Note: Barnsley won on away goals.)	Darlington	23 August 1994	2–2
Birmingham City	2–0	Shrewsbury Town	23 August 1994	3–2
Brentford	2–0	Colchester United	23 August 1994	4–0
Cambridge United	2–3	Portsmouth	23 August 1994	2–5
Carlisle United	3–1	Rotherham United	23 August 1994	3–2
Chester City	2–3	Lincoln City	23 August 1994	2–5
Chesterfield	4–2	Blackpool	23 August 1994	6–3
Fulham	1–1 (Note: Fulham won 4–3 on penalties.)	Luton Town	23 August 1994	2–2
Grimsby Town	1–2	Bradford City	23 August 1994	2–4
Hartlepool United	5–1	Bury	23 August 1994	5–3
Huddersfield Town	3–0	Scunthorpe United	23 August 1994	4–2
Leyton Orient	1–1	Barnet	23 August 1994	1–5
Mansfield Town	1–0	Rochdale	23 August 1994	3–1
Northampton Town	0–1	Bournemouth	6 September 1994	0–3
Peterborough United	0–1	Oxford United	23 August 1994	1–4
Plymouth Argyle	2–1	Walsall	23 August 1994	2–5
Port Vale	1–1	Bristol Rovers	23 August 1994	4–2
Reading	3–0	Gillingham	23 August 1994	4–0
Scarborough	2–0	Hull City	7 September 1994	3–2
Stockport County	4–1	Preston North End	23 August 1994	5–2
Swansea City	2–0	Exeter City	23 August 1994	4–2
Torquay United	4–2	Cardiff City	23 August 1994	4–3
Watford	1–0	Southend United	23 August 1994	1–0
West Bromwich Albion	0–1	Hereford United	7 September 1994	0–1
Wigan Athletic	3–0	Crewe Alexandra	23 August 1994	4–2
Wrexham	1–1	Doncaster Rovers	23 August 1994	5–3
Wycombe Wanderers	1–3	Brighton & Hove Albion	23 August 1994	2–5
York City	2–2	Burnley	23 August 1994	2–3

== Second round ==
First leg matches were played on 20 and 21 September, eight-second leg matches were played on 27 and 28 September, whilst the other second leg matches were played on 4 and 5 October.

=== First leg ===
Home team	Score	Away team	Date
Aston Villa	5–0	Wigan Athletic	21 September 1994
Barnet	1–0	Manchester City	20 September 1994
Blackburn Rovers	2–0	Birmingham City	20 September 1994
Brighton & Hove Albion	1–0	Leicester City	21 September 1994
Bristol City	0–1	Notts County	20 September 1994
Carlisle United	0–1	Queens Park Rangers	20 September 1994
Chelsea	1–0	Bournemouth	21 September 1994
Chesterfield	1–3	Wolverhampton Wanderers	20 September 1994
Everton	2–3	Portsmouth	20 September 1994
Fulham	3–2	Stoke City	20 September 1994
Hartlepool United	0–5	Arsenal	21 September 1994
Huddersfield Town	0–1	Southampton	20 September 1994
Ipswich Town	0–3	Bolton Wanderers	21 September 1994
Leeds United	0–1	Mansfield Town	21 September 1994
Lincoln City	1–0	Crystal Palace	20 September 1994
Liverpool	2–0	Burnley	21 September 1994
Millwall	2–1	Sunderland	21 September 1994
Newcastle United	2–1	Barnsley	21 September 1994
Norwich City	3–0	Swansea City	21 September 1994
Nottingham Forest	2–1	Hereford United	21 September 1994
Oxford United	1–1	Oldham Athletic	20 September 1994
Port Vale	1–2	Manchester United	21 September 1994
Reading	3–1	Derby County	20 September 1994
Scarborough	1–4	Middlesbrough	20 September 1994
Sheffield Wednesday	2–1	Bradford City	21 September 1994
Stockport County	1–5	Sheffield United	20 September 1994
Swindon Town	1–3	Charlton Athletic	21 September 1994
Tranmere Rovers	1–0	Brentford	20 September 1994
Walsall	2–1	West Ham United	20 September 1994
Watford	3–6	Tottenham Hotspur	21 September 1994
Wimbledon	2–0	Torquay United	20 September 1994
Wrexham	1–2	Coventry City	20 September 1994

=== Second leg ===
Home team	Score	Away team	Date	Agg
Arsenal	2–0	Hartlepool United	5 October 1994	7–0
Barnsley	0–1	Newcastle United	5 October 1994	1–3
Birmingham City	1–1	Blackburn Rovers	4 October 1994	1–3
Bolton Wanderers	1–0	Ipswich Town	5 October 1994	4–0
Bournemouth	0–1	Chelsea	4 October 1994	0–2
Bradford City	1–1	Sheffield Wednesday	4 October 1994	2–3
Brentford	0–0	Tranmere Rovers	27 September 1994	0–1
Burnley	1–4	Liverpool	5 October 1994	1–6
Charlton Athletic	1–4 (Note: After extra time.)	Swindon Town	27 September 1994	4–5
Coventry City	3–2	Wrexham	5 October 1994	5–3
Crystal Palace	3–0	Lincoln City	4 October 1994	3–1
Derby County	2–0 (Note: Derby County won on away goals.)	Reading	28 September 1994	3–3
Hereford United	0–0	Nottingham Forest	4 October 1994	1–2
Leicester City	0–2	Brighton & Hove Albion	5 October 1994	0–3
Manchester City	4–1	Barnet	5 October 1994	4–2
Manchester United	2–0	Port Vale	5 October 1994	4–1
Mansfield Town	0–0	Leeds United	4 October 1994	1–0
Middlesbrough	4–1	Scarborough	27 September 1994	8–2
Notts County	3–0	Bristol City	27 September 1994	4–0
Oldham Athletic	1–0	Oxford United	4 October 1994	2–1
Portsmouth	1–1	Everton	5 October 1994	4–3
Queens Park Rangers	2–0	Carlisle United	5 October 1994	3–0
Sheffield United	1–0	Stockport County	27 September 1994	6–1
Southampton	4–0	Huddersfield Town	5 October 1994	5–0
Stoke City	1–0 (Note: Stoke City won on away goals.)	Fulham	28 September 1994	3–3
Sunderland	1–1	Millwall	4 October 1994	2–3
Swansea City	1–0	Norwich City	4 October 1994	1–3
Torquay United	0–1	Wimbledon	5 October 1994	0–3
Tottenham Hotspur	2–3	Watford	4 October 1994	8–6
West Ham United	2–0	Walsall	5 October 1994	3–2
Wigan Athletic	0–3	Aston Villa	5 October 1994	0–8
Wolverhampton Wanderers	1–1	Chesterfield	27 September 1994	4–2

== Third round ==
Most matches in the third round were played on 25 and 26 October with 3 replays being played on 9 November.

=== Ties ===
Home team	Score	Away team	Date
Aston Villa	1–0	Middlesbrough	26 October 1994
Blackburn Rovers	2–0	Coventry City	26 October 1994
Brighton & Hove Albion	1–1	Swindon Town	26 October 1994
Liverpool	2–1	Stoke City	25 October 1994
Mansfield Town	0–2	Millwall	25 October 1994
Newcastle United	2–0	Manchester United	26 October 1994
Notts County	3–0	Tottenham Hotspur	26 October 1994
Oldham Athletic	0–0	Arsenal	26 October 1994
Portsmouth	0–1	Derby County	26 October 1994
Queens Park Rangers	3–4	Manchester City	25 October 1994
Sheffield United	1–2	Bolton Wanderers	25 October 1994
Sheffield Wednesday	1–0	Southampton	26 October 1994
Tranmere Rovers	1–1	Norwich City	26 October 1994
West Ham United	1–0	Chelsea	26 October 1994
Wimbledon	0–1	Crystal Palace	25 October 1994
Wolverhampton Wanderers	2–3	Nottingham Forest	26 October 1994

=== Replays ===
Home team	Score	Away team	Date
Swindon Town	4–1	Brighton & Hove Albion	9 November 1994
Arsenal	2–0	Oldham Athletic	9 November 1994
Norwich City	4–2	Tranmere Rovers	9 November 1994

== Fourth round ==
All fourth round matches were played on 30 November with one replay being played on 21 December.

=== Ties ===
Home team	Score	Away team	Date
Arsenal	2–0	Sheffield Wednesday	30 November 1994
Blackburn Rovers	1–3	Liverpool	30 November 1994
Crystal Palace	4–1	Aston Villa	30 November 1994
Manchester City	1–1	Newcastle United	30 November 1994
Norwich City	1–0	Notts County	30 November 1994
Nottingham Forest	0–2	Millwall	30 November 1994
Swindon Town	2–1	Derby County	30 November 1994
West Ham United	1–3	Bolton Wanderers	30 November 1994

=== Replay ===
Home team	Score	Away team	Date
Newcastle United	0–2	Manchester City	21 December 1994

== Quarter finals ==
The four quarter final matches were played on 11 January.

Home team	Score	Away team	Date
Bolton Wanderers	1–0	Norwich City	11 January 1995
Crystal Palace	4–0	Manchester City	11 January 1995
Liverpool	1–0	Arsenal	11 January 1995
Swindon Town	3–1	Millwall	11 January 1995

== Semi-finals ==
The semi-final draw was made after the conclusion of the quarter-finals. Unlike the other rounds, the semi-final ties were played over two legs, with each team playing one leg at home and one away.

Swindon Town were heading for a second successive relegation in Division One but their fans were given hope of silverware when they beat Bolton Wanderers 2–1 in the semi-final first leg. However, their dreams were ended in the second leg when they lost 3–1 and the Greater Manchester side reached a domestic cup final for the first time in 37 years. Four time winners Liverpool defeated Crystal Palace, another relegation threatened side, in the other semi-final.

=== First leg ===
12 February 1995

Swindon Town	2–1	Bolton Wanderers
Thorne 38', 76'	Report	Stubbs 10'

County Ground, Swindon
Attendance: 15,341
Referee: P Alcock, Surrey
15 February 1995

Liverpool	1–0	Crystal Palace
Fowler 90+2'	Report

Anfield, Liverpool
Attendance: 25,480

=== Second leg ===
8 March 1995

Bolton Wanderers	3–1	Swindon Town
McAteer 64'; Paatelainen 71'; McGinlay 88'	Report	Fjørtoft 57'

Burnden Park, Bolton
Attendance: 19,851
Referee: I Cruikshanks

Bolton won 4–3 on aggregate

8 March 1995

Crystal Palace	0–1	Liverpool
	Report	Fowler 27'

Selhurst Park, London
Attendance: 18,224

Liverpool won 2–0 on aggregate

== Final ==
2 April 1995
17:00

Liverpool	2–1	Bolton Wanderers
McManaman 37', 68'	(Report)	Thompson 69'

Wembley Stadium, London
Attendance: 75,595
Referee: Philip Don
