= Mark Patterson (footballer, born 1965) =

English footballer and manager (born 1965)

Personal information
- Full name: Mark Andrew Patterson
- Date of birth: 24 May 1965 (age 61)
- Place of birth: Darwen, England
- Height: 5 ft 6 in (1.68 m)
- Position: Midfielder

Senior career*
Years	Team	Apps	(Gls)
1983–1988	Blackburn Rovers	101	(20)
1988–1990	Preston North End	55	(19)
1990–1991	Bury	42	(10)
1991–1995	Bolton Wanderers	169	(11)
1995–1997	Sheffield United	73	(4)
1997	→ Southend United (loan)	4	(0)
1997–1999	Bury	30	(2)
1998–1999	→Blackpool (loan)	7	(0)
1999	Southend United	5	(0)
2001–2003	Scarborough	23	(0)
2002–2003	→ Leigh RMI (loan)		

Managerial career
- 2003: Leigh RMI
- 2003–2004: Chorley
- 2006–2007: Scarborough
- 2017-2020: AFC Darwen
- * Club domestic league appearances and goals

Mark Andrew Patterson (born 24 May 1965) is an English former footballer who made nearly 500 appearances in the Football League playing as a midfielder for Blackburn Rovers, Preston North End, Bury, Bolton Wanderers, Sheffield United, Southend United and Blackpool. He went on to play, and then to manage, in non-League football.

== Career ==
Patterson used to be a midfielder playing for a number of clubs over a long career including: Blackburn Rovers, Preston North End, Bury, Bolton Wanderers, Sheffield United, Southend, Blackpool, Accrington Stanley, Rossendale and Scarborough. Patterson started his coaching career with Scarborough as player-coach and then assistant manager under Russell Slade. Since then he has managed several non-league clubs including Chorley, Darwen and Leigh RMI.

After the exit of Scarborough managagment duo Neil Redfearn and his assistant Eric Winstanley, in the 2006 close season, Patterson took over as manager. Due to injuries and a small playing squad Patterson, at age 41, had to register as a player and has sat on the bench. He left the club on 4 May 2007 by mutual consent, having failed to agree a new deal. He was assistant manager to Phil Starbuck at Hednesford Town until February 2008. He later coached the Bolton Wanderers Academy and at Wigan Athletic and Accrington Stanley. In June 2017, he was appointed manager of AFC Darwen. However, he resigned in December that year with the club in the relegation zone.

In November 2021, his autobiography Old School - A Proper Football Education (written with Kevin O'Hara) was issued.

== Honours ==
Blackburn Rovers

- Full Members' Cup: 1986–87

Bolton Wanderers

- Football League Cup runner-up: 1994–95
