= Phil Brown (footballer, born 1959) =

English association football manager (born 1959)

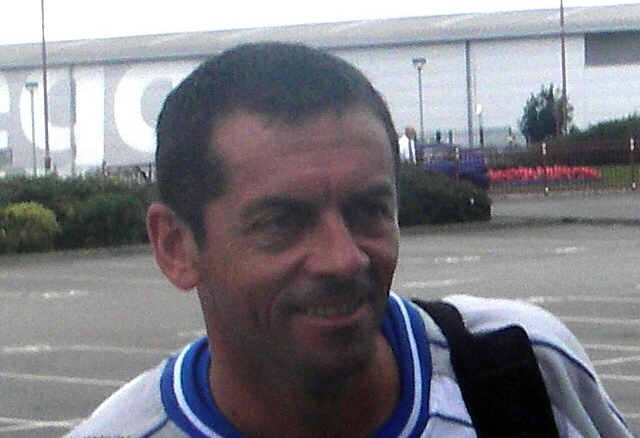
- Brown in 2005

Personal information
- Full name: Philip Brown
- Date of birth: 30 May 1959 (age 67)
- Place of birth: South Shields, England
- Height: 5 ft 11 in (1.80 m)
- Position: Right back

Team information
- Current team: Peterborough Sports (director of football)

Senior career*
| Years | Team | Apps | (Gls) |
| 1978–1985 | Hartlepool United | 217 | (8) |
| 1985–1988 | Halifax Town | 135 | (19) |
| 1988–1994 | Bolton Wanderers | 256 | (14) |
| 1994–1996 | Blackpool | 44 | (5) |
| Total | | 652 | (46) |

Managerial career
- 1999: Bolton Wanderers (caretaker)
- 2005–2006: Derby County
- 2006–2010: Hull City
- 2011: Preston North End
- 2013–2018: Southend United
- 2018: Swindon Town
- 2018–2020: Hyderabad
- 2021: Southend United
- 2022: Barrow
- 2024–2025: Kidderminster Harriers
- 2025–2026: Peterborough Sports
- * Club domestic league appearances and goals

Philip Brown (born 30 May 1959) is an English former professional footballer and coach who is currently director of football at Southern League Premier Division Central club Peterborough Sports.

As a player, Brown was a right-back who made over six hundred league appearances in an eighteen-year career, but never made it to the top flight. However, as a manager, he became the first to lead Hull City to the top division in their 104-year history, winning the Championship play-offs in 2008 after a 1–0 win against Bristol City at Wembley Stadium. He also guided Southend United to promotion from League Two to League One in 2014–15.

Since 2011, Brown has appeared as a match summariser on BBC Radio 5 Live.

== Playing career ==
Born in South Shields, County Durham, Brown started his career playing Sunday league football for South Shields side Red Duster in the South Shields Business Houses League, in the same team as Ray Dunbar and Bobby Davison, who went on to play for Derby County and Leeds United.

As a professional, Brown played at full back for many years with Hartlepool United, followed by a spell at Halifax Town (with fellow north-easterner Billy Ayre at both clubs and under him at the latter), In 1988, he moved to Bolton Wanderers, winning the Associate Members Cup in 1989.

Brown joined Blackpool in 1994, playing under Sam Allardyce until 1996 while also being his assistant manager.

== Managerial career ==
=== Coaching ===
Brown's first coaching role was as assistant to Sam Allardyce at Blackpool. He returned to Bolton Wanderers after his playing career ended and served as assistant manager to Colin Todd. Following Todd's departure in 1999, he took charge of the team as caretaker manager, winning four games out of five, until the appointment of Sam Allardyce. He then served as Allardyce's assistant for six years, before deciding to forge his own career as a manager.

=== Derby County ===
Brown's first full-time senior management position was at Derby County, where he succeeded George Burley in June 2005. His time at Derby County proved to be unsuccessful and he was dismissed after seven months in January 2006, after a 6–1 league defeat against Coventry City, followed by a 3–1 defeat to Colchester in the FA Cup fourth round. Derby were in 19th place when Brown departed.

=== Hull City ===
==== Championship and promotion ====
Brown was appointed as first-team coach at Hull City on 27 October 2006 under Phil Parkinson, and took over as joint caretaker manager alongside Colin Murphy on 4 December after Parkinson's sacking, with Hull in 22nd place in the Football League Championship. After taking Hull out of the relegation zone with three wins and a draw in the six matches as caretaker manager, he was appointed as the permanent manager of the club on 4 January 2007, while Murphy continued as his assistant.

Brown went on to lead The Tigers to Championship safety and the following season won promotion to the top level of English football for the first time in the club's 104-year history, by beating Bristol City at Wembley in the Championship play-off final on 24 May 2008. Brown described this as "the best day of my life, without a shadow of a doubt".

==== Premier League ====
Brown was rewarded with a new three-year contract, which he signed on the weekend of Hull City's first ever top-flight match, a 2–1 victory over Fulham on 16 August 2008. On 28 September Brown managed Hull to a 2–1 victory at Arsenal. It was only Arsenal's second defeat at the Emirates Stadium and was described by the Hull press as the greatest victory in the club's history. After a 1–0 victory at bottom of the table Tottenham Hotspur the following weekend, and a 3–0 away victory at the also newly promoted West Bromwich Albion, he was awarded the Manager of the Month award for Hull's performances in September.

The first nine games Hull spent as a top division club resulted in six wins as they occupied third place in the Premier League and were only being kept off the top by Liverpool and Arsenal having superior goal difference.

The remainder of the season was not so easy for Brown, as the team struggled to pick up the remaining points necessary to avoid relegation, and he was involved in several controversial incidents. In November 2008 he was fined £1,000 and warned about his future conduct by the FA after he admitted a charge of improper conduct. The charge related to a game against Wigan in August which Hull lost 5–0. On 26 December 2008, following a poor first-half performance which saw Hull 4–0 down in a league match at Manchester City, Brown conducted his half-time team-talk on the pitch, in full view of the crowd and at the end of the pitch where the Hull supporters were sitting. He explained, "I thought it was nice and cold and I thought I would keep the boys alive because they looked as if they were dead. Our 4,000 travelling fans deserved some kind of explanation for the first-half performance and it was difficult for me to do that from the confines of a changing room. We owed them an apology for the first-half performance." Hull lost the match 5–1 and Brown was widely mocked for the incident.

Brown was again charged with misconduct for his behaviour in an FA Cup tie against Newcastle United in January. During the match Brown and Newcastle manager Joe Kinnear were both sent to the stands after a confrontation in which Brown verbally abused Newcastle's assistant manager Chris Hughton. Brown admitted the charge and was subsequently fined £2,500 and warned as to his future conduct by the Football Association.

On 17 March 2009, Brown claimed that he saw Arsenal midfielder and captain Cesc Fàbregas spit at the feet of his assistant manager Brian Horton following Hull's 2–1 FA Cup defeat and elimination at the Emirates Stadium. Fabregas was cleared of the accusation on 22 May 2009. After the game Brown also falsely claimed that Arsenal manager Arsène Wenger had refused to shake his hand at one of their two previous meetings that season. Brown faced his third improper conduct charge of the season in relation to comments he made about referee Mike Riley after the Arsenal match. He denied the offence but was found guilty in a June hearing and once again fined £2,500 and warned about his future conduct.

On 24 May 2009, despite suffering a 1–0 loss to a second-string Manchester United side, Brown led Hull City to survival in the Premier League due to Newcastle United losing to Aston Villa. Hull finished in 17th place, one point above Newcastle, who also lost. Brown stated that this was the greatest achievement in his managerial career and the club's history. At the end of the game, Brown went onto the pitch with a microphone and started singing (a modified version of) "Sloop John B" to the crowd.

In the summer of 2009, Brown looked to strengthen his side. He attempted to sign former England international striker Michael Owen and former Tiger Fraizer Campbell, but was unsuccessful. Brown did manage to sign Seyi Olofinjana, Jozy Altidore (on loan from Villarreal), Kamel Ghilas, Stephen Hunt, Paul McShane, and he also signed Ibrahima Sonko on transfer deadline day on loan from Stoke City – after the departure of Michael Turner to Sunderland. Steven Mouyokolo also joined after he was initially purchased on 30 January 2009. Free agent Jan Vennegoor of Hesselink signed for the Tigers on 3 September 2009.

Brown's position as Hull manager was thought to be under threat in November 2009 following a poor start to the season, however a run of eight points from four games dampened such speculation. The team's disciplinary problems also continued, with a £40,000 fine levied following a fracas in a 3–0 defeat at Arsenal and Hull also occupying last place in the Fair Play League. On 15 March 2010 Brown was put on gardening leave at Hull after a run of four defeats left the team in the relegation zone. Hull achieved one win in the last fifteen games under Brown, and a total of five in the 2009–10 league season. His final match was a home defeat to Arsenal. His contract as manager was confirmed ended on 7 June 2010, by which time the Tigers had been relegated under new manager Iain Dowie.

=== Preston North End ===
On 6 January 2011, it was announced that Brown would become the new manager of Preston North End, replacing the sacked Darren Ferguson. In his first season at Preston, he was unable to save the club from relegation. He stated that "I nearly broke down in front of the supporters. I hold myself responsible for relegation, end of story" however "Next season we will hit the ground running – one thing is for sure, we'll be able to run".

On 14 December 2011, Brown and his assistant Brian Horton were dismissed. Preston had won once in the last 11 games, and were in 10th place, five points from the play-offs.

=== Southend United ===
On 25 March 2013, it was announced that Brown would succeed Paul Sturrock as manager of Southend United, 24 hours after Sturrock's dismissal. His contract was to last until 2015. Having reached the 2013 Football League Trophy Final under Sturrock, Southend lost 2–0 at Wembley on 7 April under Brown, to Crewe Alexandra.

In his first full season, Brown's Southend were eliminated from the playoff semi-finals by Burton Albion in May 2014. A year later, the Shrimpers won the playoff final on penalties against Wycombe Wanderers. In June 2015, shortly after promotion, his contract was extended by three years.

In 2016–17, Southend challenged for a place in the League One playoffs, but on the final day Millwall beat them to the last berth. On 17 January 2018, Brown was placed on gardening leave by Southend, after seven losses from eight left them a point above relegation.

=== Swindon Town ===
On 12 March 2018, following his spell at Southend, Brown was appointed the manager of League Two side Swindon Town until the end of the 2017–18 campaign. Although Swindon failed to qualify for the League Two playoffs, Brown signed a new two-year deal in May 2018. Brown was dismissed in November 2018, with the club lying 17th in the table.

=== Pune City / Hyderabad ===
In December 2018, Brown was appointed as head coach of Indian Super League side Pune City, which soon became Hyderabad FC, with Brown and most players staying on. He was dismissed on 11 January 2020, after just one win in 12 matches in the 2019–20 season.

=== Return to Southend ===
On 9 April 2021, Southend United confirmed that Brown would succeed Mark Molesley as manager. The team were six points from safety in League Two, with six games remaining. They were relegated with one game remaining, exiting the League for the first time since 1920. However, on 11 May 2021, Brown agreed a two-year contract to manage the club. By October 2021, Southend were in the relegation zone in the National League having lost four games in a row. Brown warned that the club were "facing oblivion" following poor results and angry confrontations between Southend chairman, Ron Martin and supporters. On 9 October, after a 4–0 home defeat by Chesterfield, Brown was "relieved of his duties". At the time Southend were in 20th place in the National League, one place above the relegation zone.

=== Barrow ===
On 21 March 2022, Brown was appointed manager of League Two club Barrow on a contract until the end of the 2021–22 season. At the time of his appointment Barrow were just six points clear of the relegation zone with the team placed in 21st having played a game less. Despite starting his spell in charge with three successive defeats, seven points from their next three matches, including a 4–0 thrashing of league leaders Forest Green Rovers, saw Barrow secure their Football League status for another season. Despite survival, negotiations with the club about Brown taking on the role on a permanent basis were unsuccessful and Brown subsequently left the club.

=== Kidderminster Harriers ===
On 10 January 2024, Brown was appointed manager of National League bottom club Kidderminster Harriers on a contract until the end of the season. Despite having overseen an initial upturn in form, winning six of his first eight matches in charge, Brown was unable to prevent the club being relegated. Following the final match of the season, Brown and his assistant Neil McDonald both signed new two-year contracts.

Seeking an immediate return to the National League, Brown was twice named National League North Manager of the Month, in November 2024, and again in March 2025 following a run of seven wins to keep the club in the hunt for automatic promotion. However, on 7 May 2025, Brown was dismissed, after failing to win promotion back to the National League.

=== Peterborough Sports ===
On 11 September 2025, Brown was appointed manager of National League North side Peterborough Sports.

In February 2026, he became director of football.

== Personal life ==
Brown is a trained electrician, and put his trade to use by carrying out electrical work at Southend's training ground. As of November 2025, he was living in the Cotswolds.

== Managerial statistics ==
As of match played 14 February 2026

Managerial record by team and tenure
| Team | From | To | Record | | | | | Ref. |
| Team | From | To | P | W | D | L | Win % | Ref. |
|---|---|---|---|---|---|---|---|---|
| Bolton Wanderers (caretaker) | 22 September 1999 | 19 October 1999 | 6 | 4 | 1 | 1 | 66.7 | |
| Derby County | 24 June 2005 | 30 January 2006 | 33 | 7 | 14 | 12 | 21.2 | |
| Hull City | 4 December 2006 | 15 March 2010 | 157 | 52 | 40 | 65 | 33.1 | |
| Preston North End | 6 January 2011 | 14 December 2011 | 51 | 15 | 15 | 21 | 29.4 | |
| Southend United | 25 March 2013 | 17 January 2018 | 251 | 98 | 65 | 88 | 39.0 | |
| Swindon Town | 12 March 2018 | 11 November 2018 | 32 | 10 | 11 | 11 | 31.3 | |
| Pune City / Hyderabad FC | 24 December 2018 | 11 January 2020 | 20 | 4 | 5 | 11 | 20.0 | |
| Southend United | 9 April 2021 | 9 October 2021 | 16 | 4 | 5 | 7 | 25.0 | |
| Barrow | 21 March 2022 | 30 June 2022 | 9 | 2 | 1 | 6 | 22.2 | |
| Kidderminster Harriers | 10 January 2024 | 7 May 2025 | 70 | 36 | 14 | 20 | 51.4 | |
| Peterborough Sports | 11 September 2025 | 4 March 2026 | 25 | 8 | 5 | 12 | 32.0 | |
| Total | | | 663 | 238 | 179 | 246 | 35.9 | — |

== Honours ==
=== Player ===
Bolton Wanderers

- Associate Members' Cup: 1988–89

Individual

- PFA Team of the Year: 1987–88 Fourth Division, 1989–90 Third Division, 1990–91 Third Division

=== Manager ===
Hull City

- Football League Championship play-offs: 2008

Southend United

- Football League Two play-offs: 2015
- Football League Trophy runner-up: 2012–13

Individual

- Premier League Manager of the Month: September 2008
- Football League Two Manager of the Month: November 2013, September 2014, November 2014, April 2015
- National League North Manager of the Month: November 2024, March 2025
