= Alan Stubbs =

English footballer (born 1971)

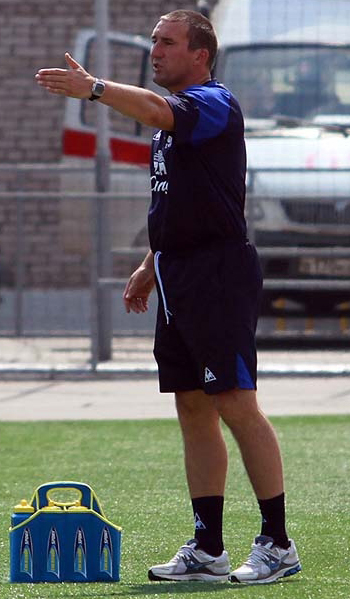
- Stubbs in 2011

Personal information
- Full name: Alan Stubbs
- Date of birth: 6 October 1971 (age 55)
- Place of birth: Kirkby, Lancashire, England
- Height: 6 ft 2 in (1.88 m)
- Position: Centre-back

Senior career*
Years	Team	Apps	(Gls)
1990–1996	Bolton Wanderers	202	(9)
1996–2001	Celtic	93	(3)
2001–2005	Everton	124	(3)
2005–2006	Sunderland	10	(1)
2006–2008	Everton	45	(3)
2008	Derby County	9	(0)
Total		483	(20)

International career
1994	England B	1	(0)

Managerial career
- 2014–2016: Hibernian
- 2016: Rotherham United
- 2018: St Mirren
- * Club domestic league appearances and goals

Alan Stubbs (born 6 October 1971) is an English football manager and former professional footballer.

As a player he was a centre-back who played top flight football for every club he played for. He played in the Premier League with Bolton Wanderers, Everton, Sunderland and Derby County as well as a five-year spell in the Scottish Premiership with Celtic. He was capped once at England B level.

Following retirement in 2008 through a knee injury, Stubbs then worked as a coach for Everton, and started his management career with Hibernian in 2014. He led Hibernian to a Scottish Cup victory in 2016, then had a brief tenure at Rotherham United. After working as a pundit for BT Sport, he was manager at St Mirren for 3 months in 2018.

== Early life ==
Alan Stubbs was born on 6 October 1971 in Kirkby, Lancashire.

== Club career ==
=== Bolton Wanderers ===
Stubbs started his career at Bolton Wanderers, turning professional in 1990 when they were members of the Football League Third Division. He played 23 league games that season but it was a disappointing first season at Burnden Park for Stubbs as his side missed out on automatic promotion on goal difference and were beaten by Tranmere Rovers in the playoff final. He remained a regular player in 1991–92 but this campaign brought further frustration as Bolton finished 13th in the Third Division and manager Phil Neal was dismissed to make way for Bruce Rioch.

Stubbs remained part of Rioch's plans as Bolton began 1992–93 in the new Division Two (following the creation of the FA Premier League and the renumbering of the three remaining Football League divisions) and scored twice in 42 league appearances as they sealed promotion as runners-up. He became club captain soon afterwards and in 1994–95 led them through their best season in years where they reached Wembley twice. The first visit to Wembley came in March, where they reached the Football League Cup final for the first time in their history, only to lose 2–1 to Liverpool. The return to Wembley for the Division One playoff final two months later was a happier occasion for Stubbs and his colleagues, though for 75 minutes it looked as though it would be another disappointment as Bolton trailed 2–0 to Reading in the contest for a place in the Premier League. But a remarkable turnaround saw them drawing 2–2 after 90 minutes to force extra time, and they went on to win 4–3 and return to the top flight for the first time since 1980.

Before the start of the season, Bolton manager Bruce Rioch departed to Arsenal and attempted to bring Stubbs with him, but this was unsuccessful.

Stubbs remained with Bolton throughout their 1995–96 campaign, their first in the top flight for 16 years, which was mostly spent in the bottom two places of the table and ended with them being relegated in bottom place.

=== Celtic ===
He joined Celtic on 10 July 1996 for £4 million, a record signing for Celtic and at the time the second biggest sale for Bolton. The deal became subject of scrutiny from FIFA, who initially fined Celtic £41,000 and Stubbs £28,000 for the use of unlicensed agents during the transfer. These fines were later reduced to £22,000 and £18,000 respectively on appeal.

His first season at Celtic, 1996–97, saw him play regularly but Stubbs did little to justify his expensive transfer fee as Rangers clinched their ninth successive Scottish League championship.

The following season (1997–98 season) saw a new manager, Wim Jansen, in charge at Celtic and a new partner in central defence alongside Stubbs, Danish international Marc Rieper. Both these factors saw an upturn in Stubbs' fortunes at Celtic, and his pairing with Rieper in defence made Celtic a much more formidable obstacle to rivals Rangers. After an initial shaky start to the season, Celtic began to find their form and Stubbs picked up his first winner's medal on 30 November 1997 with Celtic beating Dundee United 3–0 in the Scottish League Cup Final.

Stubbs is probably best remembered for his injury time goal 11 days earlier (19 November 1997) in a 1–1 draw with Rangers, which kept Rangers lead in the league at the time over Celtic to a recoverable 4 points. Many believe that this was the most important goal of the season for Celtic; they would later go on to overtake Rangers in the league and win the Scottish Premier Division that season, their first league title since 1988, and prevent Rangers from securing a record-breaking 10 league titles in a row.

Stubbs continued to impress at Celtic with his strong presence in defence, good range of passing and occasional goal. However a routine drug test after the Scottish Cup Final defeat to Rangers in May 1999 revealed Stubbs was suffering from testicular cancer. Stubbs recovered and continued to be a mainstay in the Celtic side, picking up another winner's medal in March 2000 when he came on as a second-half substitute for Ľubomír Moravčík during Celtic's 2–0 win over Aberdeen in the Scottish League Cup Final. Stubbs also played 11 games in their 2000–01 SPL title winning season under new manager Martin O'Neill. However, he missed most of that campaign as he discovered early in the season that the cancer had come back. and had again to undergo treatment.

Stubbs again recovered from his illness, making his comeback in May 2001 in a league match against Hibernian where he came on as a second-half substitute to a rousing reception from both sets of fans and scored Celtic's fourth goal in a 5–2 win. However, Stubbs wife never truly settled in Scotland and his own battles with cancer saw the family look to make a return home to England.

=== Everton ===
He joined Everton in July 2001 after winning his battle against cancer, and after his Celtic contract expired. On his arrival at Goodison Park, Stubbs stated it had always been his dream to play for the club. Stubbs confirmed at the time part of his motive for moving to Everton was that he wanted to return home to his native Merseyside with his wife Mandy.

Stubbs quickly became a regular member of the team and excelled during his first season, as Everton finished 15th and reached the quarter-finals of the FA Cup. Stubbs continued to be a consistent performer in the heart of the Toffees defence during the 2002–03 as he helped them finish seventh in the Premier League (their highest finish since 1996) under new manager David Moyes, and 2003–04, although they dipped to 17th and narrowly avoided relegation in this campaign.

The 2004–05 season was another successful campaign for Stubbs. Although a shoulder injury kept him out in April, he made 36 appearances, scoring once - in a 2–1 win against Portsmouth. He captained Everton to a 4th-place finish in the league which entered Everton into the qualifying rounds of the Champions League. He was set to continue as a vital part of the squad in 2005–06, but refused to sign a new contract as the club were willing to offer him only a one-year deal, and later revelations suggested a "cancer clause" in the contract that Stubbs was unhappy with; claims Everton denied.

=== Sunderland ===
Stubbs signed for Sunderland on 2 August 2005. Stubbs' final appearance at the Stadium of Light was to be the 3–0 victory over Northwich Victoria in the FA Cup. He scored once for Sunderland, in a 3–1 defeat at Arsenal on 5 November 2005. This was one of the worst seasons in Sunderland's history, as they were relegated with a then record Premier League low of three wins and 15 points.

=== Return to Everton ===
Stubbs returned to Everton on a free transfer on 20 January 2006, signing a contract that was due to last until the end of the season. His form improved dramatically following his return, leading to manager David Moyes referring to him as "indispensable" in March.

Despite the arrival of Joleon Lescott that summer, Stubbs maintained his place in starting line up and proved to be a pivotal figure behind Everton's push for a UEFA Cup place.

In September 2007, after the murder of Rhys Jones, an 11-year-old Everton fan shot dead in Croxteth, Stubbs delivered a reading at his funeral to a packed Liverpool Cathedral including members of Everton and Liverpool.

=== Derby County ===
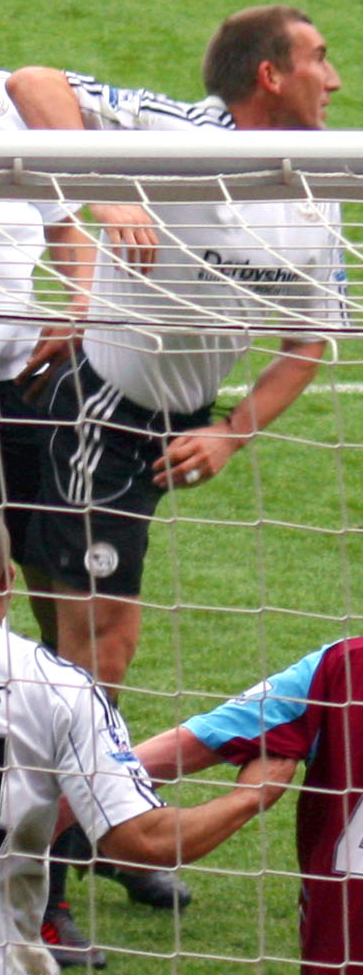
Stubbs playing for Derby County in 2008

On 31 January 2008, Stubbs moved to Derby County in an 18-month deal on a free transfer. Derby's relegation from the Premiership with 11 points meant that Stubbs had been involved in the campaigns of the teams with two lowest points totals attained since the league's inception. On 20 August 2008, just after the start of Derby's 2008–09 Football League Championship campaign, it was announced that a recurring knee injury had forced him to retire from playing football.

== International career ==
Stubbs won an England B cap on 10 May 1994 in a match against Northern Ireland 'B' at Hillsborough. England won the match 4–2, with Stubbs coming on during the second half as a substitute for Chris Bart-Williams.

== Coaching career ==
=== Everton coach ===
In September 2008, Stubs returned once more to Everton, this time as a coach, where he was assistant manager of the U21 team for five years, before managing them for one year. In May 2013, Stubbs was interviewed by Bill Kenwright for the vacant manager's role at Everton, but Roberto Martínez was eventually selected to be the team's new manager. Despite this, Stubbs later credited Martínez for inspiring him to become a manager in his own right.

=== Hibernian ===
Stubbs was appointed head coach of Scottish club Hibernian (Hibs) in June 2014 on a two-year contract, as Terry Butcher's successor after the club had been relegated to the Scottish Championship. This came after Hibs with Everton's permission had opened talks with Stubbs, who believed he was ready to become a manager. In his first press conference, Stubbs announced his aim of helping Hibs win promotion back to the Scottish Premiership by rebuilding the squad ahead of the new season. To do that, Stubbs also recruited his own backroom staff, consisting of assistant coach Andy Holden, player-coach Alan Combe, head physiotherapist John Porteous, strength and conditioning coach Paul Green, and first-team coach John Doolan.

Under Stubbs' management, Hibs made ten signings, of which four were loan deals. Stubbs' first league match in charge was against Livingston; unusually, the Hibs goalkeeper (Mark Oxley) scored the winning goal. Stubbs guided Hibs to second place in the 2014–15 Scottish Championship, securing the position above Rangers on the last day of the season. Hibs entered the Premiership playoffs at the semi-final stage, but lost 2–1 on aggregate to Rangers. Stubbs also guided Hibernian to a semi-final place in the 2014–15 Scottish Cup, where they lost 1–0 against Falkirk. In the 2015-16 season, Hibs initially challenged Rangers for automatic promotion but eventually finished third and lost in the playoffs to Falkirk. Hibs reached both domestic cup finals in 2015–16, losing the League Cup final to Ross County, but winning 3–2 in the Scottish Cup final against Rangers. This was the first time Hibs had won the Scottish Cup for 114 years.

=== Rotherham United ===
Stubbs was appointed manager of EFL Championship club Rotherham United on 1 June 2016. His only win came on 20 August 2016, with Danny Ward scoring the only goal in a 1–0 win over Brentford. However, he was sacked less than two months later on 19 October 2016 following a 4–2 defeat to Birmingham City, and a record seventh straight away loss. Under Stubbs' tenure, Rotherham lost ten of their first fourteen games, winning just once. They also conceded 37 goals during this period, leaving them with the worst goal difference in the entire EFL. Rotherham replaced Alan Stubbs with Kenny Jackett on 21 October 2016.

=== St Mirren ===
Stubbs was appointed St Mirren manager in June 2018. On 3 September, it was announced that Stubbs had left the club after less than three months in charge.

== Managerial statistics ==
As of match played 1 September 2018

Managerial record by team and tenure
Team	From	To	Record					Ref
Team	From	To	P	W	D	L	Win %	Ref
Hibernian	24 June 2014	1 June 2016	100	58	19	23	58.0	
Rotherham United	1 June 2016	19 October 2016	14	1	3	10	7.1	
St Mirren	8 June 2018	3 September 2018	9	2	3	4	22.2	
Career total			123	61	25	37	49.6	

== Honours ==
=== Player ===
Bolton Wanderers

- Football League First Division play-offs: 1995
- Football League Cup runner-up: 1994–95

Celtic

- Scottish Premier Division: 1997–98, 2000–01
- Scottish Cup: 2000–01
- Scottish League Cup: 1997–98, 1999–2000, 2000–01

Individual

- PFA Team of the Year: 1994–95 First Division

=== Manager ===
Hibernian

- Scottish Cup: 2015–16

Individual

- Scottish Championship Manager of the Month: September 2014, February 2015, October 2015, November 2015
