= List of Blyth Spartans A.F.C. seasons =

Blyth Spartans Association Football Club is an association football club based in Blyth, Northumberland. They are currently members of the Northern Premier League Division One East, the eighth tier of English football, and play at Croft Park.

== Early history ==
In the beginning, the club played only friendly matches before joining the East Northumberland League in 1901. The first recorded honour was a league success in 1901 followed by further victories in 1905–06 and 1906–07. The club then joined the Northern Football Alliance, remaining there for six seasons winning the league in 1908–09 and 1912–13. In 1913 the club moved upward joining the ranks of the semi professionals in the North Eastern League and remained there until this league folded in 1958.

== Key ==
Key to league record

- Level = Level of the league in the current league system
- Pld = Games played
- W = Games won
- D = Games drawn
- L = Games lost
- GF = Goals for
- GA = Goals against
- GD = Goals difference
- Pts = Points
- Position = Position in the final league table
- Top scorer and number of goals scored shown in bold when he was also top scorer for the division.

Key to cup records

- Res = Final reached round
- Rec = Final club record in the form of wins-draws-losses
- PR = Preliminary round
- QR1 (2, etc.) = Qualifying Cup rounds
- G = Group stage
- R1 (2, etc.) = Proper Cup rounds
- QF = Quarter-finalists
- SF = Semi-finalists
- F = Finalists
- A(QF, SF, F) = Area quarter-, semi-, finalists
- W = Winners

== Seasons ==
Year	League														Cup competitions				Manager
Year	Division	Lvl	Pld	W	D	L	GF	GA	GD	Pts	Position	Leading league scorer		Average attendance	FA Cup		FA Trophy		Manager
Year	Division	Lvl	Pld	W	D	L	GF	GA	GD	Pts	Position	Name	Goals	Average attendance	Res	Rec	Res	Rec	Manager
1913–14	**North Eastern League**		38	19	7	12	71	51	+20	45	6th of 20				—				
1914–15	**North Eastern League**		38	10	9	19	49	75	-26	29	15th of 20				—		—		
No competitive football was played between 1915 and 1919 due to the World War I
1919–20	**North Eastern League**		34	18	8	8	64	42	+22	44	4th of 18				—				
1920–21	**North Eastern League**		38	19	11	8	69	34	+35	49	5th of 20				QR6	1-0-1			
1921–22	**North Eastern League**		38	16	16	6	55	31	+24	48	3rd of 20				—				
1922–23	**North Eastern League**		38	23	7	8	78	43	+35	53	2nd of 20				R1	2-0-1			
1923–24	**North Eastern League**		38	21	7	10	68	35	+33	49	6th of 20				—				
1924–25	**North Eastern League**		38	17	9	12	69	46	+23	43	8th of 20				—				
1925–26	**North Eastern League**		38	13	6	19	77	106	-29	32	14th of 20				R2	3-1-1			
1926–27	**North Eastern League**		38	17	6	15	78	72	+6	40	9th of 20				—				
1927–28	**North Eastern League**		38	14	4	20	56	77	-21	32	13th of 20				QR4	?			
1928–29	**North Eastern League**		38	13	10	15	66	75	-9	36	11th of 20				—				
1929–30	**North Eastern League**		38	10	6	22	58	95	-37	26	19th of 20				—				
1930–31	**North Eastern League**		42	22	6	14	95	78	+17	50	7th of 22				—				
1931–32	**North Eastern League**		42	24	9	9	129	75	+54	57	5th of 22				R2	1-0-1			
1932–33	**North Eastern League**		38	15	4	19	79	84	-5	34	10th of 20				QR4	0-0-1			
1933–34	**North Eastern League**		38	23	5	10	81	58	+23	51	4th of 20				QR4	0-1-1			
1934–35	**North Eastern League**		38	23	4	11	95	55	+40	50	5th of 20				R1	1-1-1			
1935–36	**North Eastern League**		38	26	4	8	104	60	+44	56	1st of 20				R1	1-0-1			
1936–37	**North Eastern League**		38	21	7	10	103	68	+35	49	5th of 20				R1	1-0-1			
1937–38	**North Eastern League**		38	21	6	11	113	70	+43	48	4th of 20				R1	1-1-1			
1938–39	**North Eastern League**		38	15	9	14	82	97	-15	39	9th of 20				—				
1939–40	**North Eastern League**		3	2	0	1	4	4	0	6	9th of 20				—				
No competitive football was played between 1939 and 1946 due to the World War II
1947–48	**North Eastern League**		38	15	10	13	62	60	+2	40	8th of 20				QR3	3-0-1			Mark Lawton
1948–49	**North Eastern League**		38	18	7	13	71	56	+15	43	8th of 20				QR3	3-0-1			Joe Wilson
1949–50	**North Eastern League**		38	18	8	12	87	69	+18	44	6th of 20				QR3	3-0-1			Joe Wilson
1950–51	**North Eastern League**		38	15	9	14	67	76	-9	39	10th of 20				QR2	2-0-1			committee
1951–52	**North Eastern League**		34	11	10	13	53	68	-15	32	10th of 18				R2	5-4-1			committee
1952–53	**North Eastern League**		34	20	5	9	93	61	+32	45	4th of 18				QR4	0-0-1			committee
1953–54	**North Eastern League**		34	11	6	17	48	82	-34	28	14th of 18				R1	1-0-1			Tom Blenkinsopp
1954–55	**North Eastern League**		34	13	7	14	64	78	-14	33	9th of 18				R2	2-1-1			Doug Wright
1955–56	**North Eastern League**		34	17	3	14	68	80	-12	37	7th of 18				QR4	0-0-1			Doug Wright
1956–57	**North Eastern League**		34	17	5	12	90	71	+19	39	8th of 18				R2	2-0-1			Doug Wright
1957–58	**North Eastern League**		34	14	7	13	65	66	-1	35	9th of 18				QR4	0-0-1			Jim Turney
The North Eastern League folded. Club joined the Midland Football League
1958–59	**Midland Football League**		36	18	10	8	79	52	+27	46	5th of 19				R2	2-0-1			Jim Turney
1959–60	**Midland Football League**		32	13	10	9	74	51	+23	36	5th of 17				R1	1-0-1			Jim Turney
1960–61	**Northern Counties League**		18	8	6	4	29	22	+7	22	3rd of 10				R1	1-0-1			Jim Turney
1961–62	**Northern Counties League**		24	7	6	11	52	61	-9	20	9th of 13				R1	1-0-1			Jim Turney
The league changed name
1962–63	**North Eastern League**		22	11	3	8	49	39	+10	25	4th of 12				R2	2-0-1			Jim Turney
1963–64	**North Eastern League**		14	7	2	5	43	33	+10	16	4th of 8				R1	1-0-1			Jim Turney
The North Eastern League folded. Club joined the Northern Football League
1964–65	**Northern Football League**		34	4	2	28	38	105	-67	10	18th of 18				QR1	0-0-1			Jim Turney
1965–66	**Northern Football League**		34	13	7	14	87	81	+6	33	10th of 18				QR2	1-0-1			Jim Turney
1966–67	**Northern Football League**		34	16	4	14	69	63	+6	36	9th of 18				QR1	4-4-1			Jim Turney
1967–68	**Northern Football League**		34	14	7	13	80	71	+9	35	8th of 18				QR1	0-0-1			Tony Knox
1968–69	**Northern Football League**		34	18	9	7	76	36	+40	45	5th of 18				QR2	1-0-1			Jackie Marks
1969–70	**Northern Football League**		34	23	6	5	92	34	+58	52	3rd of 18				QR2	1-2-1	—		Jackie Marks
1970–71	**Northern Football League**		38	19	7	12	74	49	+25	45	5th of 20				QR4	3-1-1	—		Allan Jones
1971–72	**Northern Football League**		38	24	7	7	85	42	+43	55	2nd of 20				R3	6-2-1	—		Allan Jones
1972–73	**Northern Football League**		38	28	3	7	102	39	+63	59	1st of 20				QR4	0-0-1	—		Billy Bell
1973–74	**Northern Football League**		38	30	4	4	87	37	+50	64	2nd of 20				QR2	2-2-1	—		Eddie Alder & Billy Fenwick
1974–75	**Northern Football League**		36	30	6	0	105	38	+67	96	1st of 19				R1	1-1-1	R1	1-0-1	Alan O’Neill
1975–76	**Northern Football League**		38	28	4	6	88	36	+52	88	1st of 20				QR4	0-1-1	QR3	0-0-1	Alan O’Neill
1976–77	**Northern Football League**		38	19	9	10	80	49	+31	66	5th of 20				QR4	0-0-1	R1	0-0-1	Alan O’Neill; Brian Slane
1977–78	**Northern Football League**		38	27	8	3	107	37	+70	89	2nd of 20				R5	8-2-1	R1	1-0-1	Brian Slane; Jackie Marks
1978–79	**Northern Football League**		38	19	12	7	81	39	+42	69	5th of 20				R1	1-1-1	R2	1-2-1	Jackie Marks
1979–80	**Northern Football League**		38	29	5	4	93	28	+65	92	1st of 20				R1	1-1-1	QF	3-2-1	Jackie Marks
1980–81	**Northern Football League**		38	27	5	6	89	35	+54	86	1st of 20				QR3	2-0-1	R3	2-0-1	Jackie Marks
1981–82	**Northern Football League**		38	25	8	5	77	31	+46	83	1st of 20				R1	1-0-1	R2	1-0-1	Bob Elwell
Northern Football League expanded up to two divisions
1982–83	**Northern Football League**; **Division One**		36	23	11	2	92	31	+61	80	1st of 19				QR4	0-0-1	QF	3-1-1	Bob Elwell; John Connolly
1983–84	**Northern Football League**; **Division One**		34	23	9	2	74	22	+52	78	1st of 18				QR4	0-1-1	R1	0-1-1	John Connolly; Mick Dagless
1984–85	**Northern Football League**; **Division One**		34	24	3	7	86	36	+50	75	2nd of 18				QR1	0-1-1	R1	0-0-1	Peter Feenan
1985–86	**Northern Football League**; **Division One**		38	19	9	10	79	52	+27	66	4th of 20				QR3	2-1-1	R1	1-0-1	Peter Feenan; Jim Pearson
1986–87	**Northern Football League**; **Division One**		38	29	7	2	87	36	+51	94	1st of 20				QR3	2-1-1	R3	3-4-1	Jim Pearson
1987–88	**Northern Football League**; **Division One**		38	28	8	2	106	36	+70	92	1st of 20				QR3	2-0-1	R1	0-2-1	Jim Pearson
1988–89	**Northern Football League**; **Division One**		38	13	13	12	51	50	+1	52	9th of 20				QR2	1-0-1	R1	0-0-1	Dave Clarke; Tommy Dixon
1989–90	**Northern Football League**; **Division One**		38	15	8	15	58	58	0	53	9th of 20				QR3	2-0-1	R1	1-0-1	Tommy Dixon
1990–91	**Northern Football League**; **Division One**		38	20	8	10	80	50	+30	68	3rd of 20				QR2	1-0-1	QR3	0-2-1	Ronnie Walton
1991–92	**Northern Football League**; **Division One**		38	19	8	11	63	44	+19	65	6th of 20				QR1	0-0-1	R1	1-1-1	Ronnie Walton
1992–93	**Northern Football League**; **Division One**		38	26	4	8	83	35	+48	82	4th of 20				R1	4-1-1	R1	1-0-1	Ronnie Walton; Peter Feenan
1993–94	**Northern Football League**; **Division One**		38	22	7	9	81	37	+44	73	2nd of 20				QR1	0-0-1	R1	1-0-1	Peter Feenan
1994–95	**Northern Premier League**; **Division One**	7	42	26	9	7	95	55	+40	87	1st of 22				QR4	3-0-1	R1	1-2-1	Harry Dunn
1995–96	**Northern Premier League**; **Premier Division**	6	42	17	13	12	75	61	+14	64	6th of 22				R2	5-0-1	R2	2-0-1	Harry Dunn; Peter Harrison
1996–97	**Northern Premier League**; **Premier Division**	6	44	22	11	11	74	49	+25	77	7th of 23				QR4	0-0-1	R1	1-2-1	Peter Harrison; John Burridge
1997–98	**Northern Premier League**; **Premier Division**	6	42	12	13	17	52	63	-11	39	18th of 22				R1	4-1-1	R1	1-0-1	John Burridge
1998–99	**Northern Premier League**; **Premier Division**	6	42	14	9	19	56	64	-8	51	14th of 22				QR2	0-1-1	R1	0-1-1	Alan Shoulder; John Gamble
1999–2000	**Northern Premier League**; **Premier Division**	6	44	15	9	20	62	67	-5	54	14th of 23				QR2	0-0-1	R3	2-0-1	John Gamble; Mick Tait
2000–01	**Northern Premier League**; **Premier Division**	6	44	15	9	20	61	64	-3	54	14th of 23			328	QR2	0-0-1	R5	4-1-1	John Charlton
2001–02	**Northern Premier League**; **Premier Division**	6	44	14	16	14	59	62	-3	58	12th of 23			432	QR3	1-0-1	R3	2-0-1	John Charlton
2002–03	**Northern Premier League**; **Premier Division**	6	44	14	9	21	67	87	-20	51	19th of 23			366	QR4	2-1-1	R3	2-0-1	John Charlton; Paul Baker
2003–04	**Northern Premier League**; **Premier Division**	6	44	10	10	24	54	74	-20	40	21st of 23			398	QR4	2-0-1	R4	3-0-1	Paul Baker
Conference North, a new sixth tier league created, club did not qualified to join it
2004–05	**Northern Premier League**; **Premier Division**	7	42	13	13	16	53	55	-2	52	12th of 22			313	QR1	0-0-1	R2	1-0-1	Paul Baker; Harry Dunn
2005–06	**Northern Premier League**; **Premier Division**	7	42	26	11	5	79	32	+47	89	1st of 22			528	QR4	3-1-1	R2	4-0-1	Harry Dunn
2006–07	**Conference North**	6	42	19	9	14	57	49	+8	66	7th of 22			659	QR3	1-1-1	QR3	0-2-0	Harry Dunn
2007–08	**Conference North**	6	42	12	10	20	52	62	-10	46	18th of 22			489	QR3	1-0-1	R2	1-2-1	Harry Dunn
2008–09	**Conference North**	6	42	14	7	21	50	58	-8	49	15th of 22			566	R3	5-2-1	QR3	0-0-1	Harry Dunn
2009–10	**Conference North**	6	40	13	9	18	67	72	-5	48	13th of 21			486	QR4	2-2-1	QR3	0-1-1	Mick Tait
2010–11	**Conference North**	6	40	16	10	14	61	54	+7	58	9th of 21	Paul Brayson	23	449	QR2	0-0-1	QF	4-1-1	Mick Tait
2011–12	**Conference North**	6	42	7	13	22	51	81	-30	34	21st of 22	Graeme Armstrong; Glen Taylor	7	422	R1	3-1-1	QR3	0-0-1	Steve Cuggy; Tommy Cassidy
2012–13	**Northern Premier League**; **Premier Division**	7	42	15	6	21	70	87	-17	51	16th of 22			326	QR2	1-1-1	QR1	0-0-1	Tommy Cassidy; Paddy Atkinson; Tom Wade
2013–14	**Northern Premier League**; **Premier Division**	7	46	20	12	14	79	78	+1	72	8th of 24			360	QR1	0-0-1	QR2	1-0-1	Tom Wade
2014–15	**Northern Premier League**; **Premier Division**	7	46	21	16	9	84	54	+30	79	6th of 24			464	R3	6-1-1	QR2	1-1-1	Tom Wade
2015–16	**Northern Premier League**; **Premier Division**	7	46	32	3	11	89	41	+48	99	2nd of 24			688	QR1	0-0-1	QR3	2-0-1	Tom Wade
2015–16	**Northern Premier League**; **Premier Division**	7	Lost in the **play-off** semifinal												QR1	0-0-1	QR3	2-0-1	Tom Wade
2016–17	**Northern Premier League**; **Premier Division**	7	46	31	8	7	114	44	+70	101	1st of 24			649	QR2	1-0-1	QR3	2-2-1	Tom Wade; Alun Armstrong
2017–18	**National League North**	6	42	19	2	21	76	69	+7	59	10th of 22	Daniel Maguire	16	798	QR2	0-0-1	R2	2-0-1	Alun Armstrong
2018–19	**National League North**	6	42	20	9	13	74	62	+12	69	6th of 22	Daniel Maguire	20	816	QR4	2-1-1	R3	3-0-1	Alun Armstrong
2018–19	**National League North**	6	Lost in the **play-off** semifinal												QR4	2-1-1	R3	3-0-1	Alun Armstrong
2019–20	**National League North**	6	33	6	5	22	32	78	-46	23	21st of 22	Callum Roberts	11	839	QR3	1-1-1	R1	1-1-1	Lee Clark; Michael Nelson
2019–20	**National League North**	6	The regular season was cut short due to COVID-19, final league positions decided by points-per-game												QR3	1-1-1	R1	1-1-1	Lee Clark; Michael Nelson
2020–21	**National League North**	6	14	1	3	10	10	36	-26	6	22nd of 22	Paul Blackett	5	– (Note: COVID-19 prevented fans from attending games)	QR3	1-0-1	R2	0-0-0	Michael Nelson
2020–21	**National League North**	6	The season was declared null and void due to COVID-19												QR3	1-0-1	R2	0-0-0	Michael Nelson
2021–22	**National League North**	6	42	12	7	23	41	76	-35	43	19th of 22	JJ O'Donnell	14	926	QR3	1-1-1	R2	0-0-1	Michael Nelson; Terry Mitchell
2022–23	**National League North**	6	46	12	14	20	49	62	-13	50	19th of 24	Nicky Deverdics	7	786	QR4	2-1-1	R3	1-0-1	Graham Fenton
2023–24	**National League North**	6	46	13	11	22	66	82	-16	50	21st of 24	Nicky Deverdics; JJ Hooper	11	893	QR3	1-2-1	R3	1-0-1	Graham Fenton; Jon Shaw
2024–25	**Northern Premier League**; **Premier Division**	7	42	3	9	30	38	100	-62	18	22nd of 22	JJ Hooper; Billy Gordon	5	594	QR2	1-1-1	QR3	0-0-1	Nolberto Solano; David Stockdale; Michael Connor; Colin Myers

== Notes ==
- Source: Blyth Spartans at the Football Club History Database
