= 2006 English football corruption investigation =

Football Corruption, (2006) England

In 2006, several allegations were made of corruption in English football, by sources both inside and outside the game, including a BBC Panorama investigation. In response, the Football Association commissioned a report from Lord Stevens, former Commissioner of the Metropolitan Police, and subsequently an investigation was carried out by the City of London police, leading to many arrests.

== Allegations ==
=== January – Managers ===
In January 2006, then Luton Town manager, Mike Newell and then-manager of Queens Park Rangers, Ian Holloway alleged that bribes were rife in the sport. The Football Association subsequently held talks with the two managers and established an enquiry.

=== September – BBC Panorama ===
On 19 September 2006 the BBC current affairs television programme Panorama broadcast a special investigation into corruption in English football which had begun filming in August 2005.

"Undercover: Football's Dirty Secrets" included footage shown of meetings between agents, managers and high ranking football club officials, filmed undercover by Knut auf dem Berge, a freelance coach posing as a prospective football agent. This footage purported to show agents and managers accepting backhanders and illegally "tapping-up" players under contract to other clubs.

These allegations included:

- That Bolton Wanderers manager Sam Allardyce, and his agent son Craig were alleged to have accepted bribes from agents for signing certain players. Two agents, Teni Yerima and Peter Harrison, were secretly filmed, each separately claiming that they had paid Allardyce through his son. Allardyce denies ever taking, or asking for, a bribe.
- Then Portsmouth manager Harry Redknapp is secretly filmed discussing the possibility of buying the Blackburn Rovers captain Andy Todd with agent Peter Harrison, which is illegal under FA rules. However, the programme merely showed Harrison approaching Redknapp and asking direct questions which Redknapp answered.
- Then Portsmouth first-team coach Kevin Bond, first team coach of Newcastle United when the programme was aired, is secretly recorded admitting he would consider discussing receiving payments from a proposed new agency involving agent Peter Harrison. This was the programme's description; it did not seem explicit from the extract broadcast. Bond was suspended and then sacked by Newcastle as a result of the allegations.
- Chelsea director of youth football Frank Arnesen is secretly filmed making an illegal approach or "tapping up" Middlesbrough's England youth star 15-year-old Nathan Porritt. Arnesen offers a fee of £150,000 spread over three years as an incentive to move, although he had been advised that it was 99.9% certain that Porritt would leave Middlesbrough. Both of these allegations are illegal under FA rules. Officials from Liverpool and Newcastle United were also implicated in attempts to sign Porritt.
- Agent Peter Harrison told the undercover reporter that, to secure transfer deals with Bolton, he bribed Sam Allardyce by offering to pay his son Craig. Harrison is a FIFA-listed agent, who is based in the north-east of England.
- That three different Bolton transfer signings involved secret payments from agents to Craig Allardyce, some when he was contractually banned from doing any Bolton deals. Panorama alleged Bolton's transfer signings of defender Tal Ben Haim, midfielder Hidetoshi Nakata and goalkeeper Ali Al Habsi involved secret payments from agents to Craig Allardyce. Allardyce's son quit the agency business in summer 2006, and has admitted in newspaper interviews that his working as an agent might have cost his father the chance of becoming England manager.
- Agent Charles Collymore, is secretly filmed in the Panorama film, saying: "There's managers out there who take bungs all day long. I would say to you comfortably there's six to eight managers we could definitely approach and they'd be up for this no problem." Later, Collymore is named publicly for the first time by Luton Town manager Mike Newell as the agent who offered him an illegal payment. Collymore also represents England cricketer Simon Jones.

The programme also claimed to have set up a sting involving handing a cash payment to an unnamed Premiership manager, but the alleged manager did not turn up at the rendezvous. The programme claimed that he had been scared off by Mike Newell's claims being revealed that same day.

=== September – Telegraph Sport ===
On 26 September, the Daily Telegraph alleged that an unlicensed agent was paid in the deal to bring Tal Ben Haim to Bolton Wanderers. When the Israeli international moved to England, agent Jamie Hart – the official middle man – was paid a fee by Bolton. But he has now confirmed that unlicensed agent David Abu also received a cut of the fee for the role he played in the deal. Allardyce's son, Craig, a key protagonist in the Panorama documentary, also received a payment but when quizzed on such payments Bolton Chairman Phil Gartside confirmed he had no such knowledge.

== Reaction ==
On 3 March 2006, The Football Association established an enquiry to be headed by Lord Stevens, former Commissioner of the Metropolitan Police and former head of an enquiry into corruption in cricket. The initial findings of Stevens' report were announced in December 2006.

On 20 September, The Football Association asked the BBC to provide all of the collected evidence and announced that it would investigate these allegations. It was to investigate allegations of illegal approaches involving Chelsea sporting director Frank Arnesen, Liverpool, Newcastle United and Portsmouth manager Harry Redknapp, along with allegations "relating to players' agents and connected activities" involving Bolton Wanderers manager Sam Allardyce, son Craig Allardyce, Newcastle United assistant manager Kevin Bond, and agents Charles Collymore and Peter Harrison.

All of those accused of impropriety have denied all allegations arising from the programme, including:

- Sam Allardyce: said that he had placed the matter in the hands of his lawyers. On 25 September he announced that after lengthy discussions his lawyers had advised that "I have a very strong case in relation to the programme, and I am planning to sue the BBC over the false and highly damaging allegations. I have therefore instructed my lawyers to prepare my case against the BBC." Allardyce added that he would discuss the matter with Bolton chairman, Phil Gartside, as well as his wife before he took any final decision. Allardyce has not yet filed any legal action against the BBC, meaning the allegations remain legally unchallenged.
- Kevin Bond: said that he intended to sue the BBC for libel. Newcastle United placed him on gardening leave following the broadcast, and terminated his contract on 26 September. In response, Bond issued a statement claiming that Newcastle had sacked him without investigating properly. Bond was employed again within a month, as manager of AFC Bournemouth. Kevin Bond filed legal papers against the BBC, but withdrew the libel action, 8 days before the trial was set to commence. The BBC's claims against Bond remain legally unchallenged.

The League Managers Association demanded hard evidence: "As the organisation which represents managers we were very disappointed with the programme. There was a complete lack of substance and evidence, and if the BBC has any hard evidence it should give it to the Football Association." HM Revenue & Customs has also indicated it will look into the claims. No libel proceedings were issued by any of those accused of wrongdoing in the broadcast.

== Stevens report ==
It was announced on 2 October 2006 that Lord Stevens' inquiry into football corruption had been extended by two months to investigate 39 transfers involving eight clubs. On 20 December 2006, Stevens presented his preliminary report, which found that while the level of corruption within English football was not as high as had been anticipated, there were several causes for concern. Seventeen transfer deals were still subject to further scrutiny.

On 15 June 2007, Lord Stevens' inquiry issued its final report which raised concerns over issues involving 17 player transfers, involving five clubs, three managers and numerous agents and other third parties. In summary, the report stated: "there is no evidence of any irregular payments to club officials or players, and they are identified only as a consequence of the outstanding issues the inquiry has with the agents involved".

Details of one of the suspect transfer deals was withheld. The other transfers about which there are unresolved issues are:

=== Bolton Wanderers ===
- Ali Al-Habsi (Free transfer from Lyn Oslo – 7 January 2006)
- Tal Ben Haim (Free transfer from Maccabi Tel Aviv – 29 July 2004)
- Blessing Kaku (Free transfer from F.C. Ashdod – 24 August 2004)
- Julio Correia (Free transfer from Real Valladolid – 25 July 2004)

There were also unanswered concerns regarding the involvement of Craig Allardyce in a number of transactions. "The inquiry remains concerned at the conflict of interest that it believes existed between Craig Allardyce, his father Sam Allardyce – the then manager at Bolton – and the club itself".

=== Chelsea ===
- Didier Drogba (£24 million from Marseille – 20 July 2004)
- Petr Čech (£7 million from Rennes – 1 June 2004)
- Michael Essien (£24.4 million from Lyon – 19 August 2005)

"Agent Pinhas Zahavi has failed to co-operate fully with the inquiry. There was an initial failure to disclose his involvement in a number of transfers but, more seriously, he has failed to provide the inquiry with complete bank statements due to the confidential nature of them. There has also been a lack of responsiveness by Zahavi. There remains questions relating to his relationship with, and payments to, licensed agent Barry Silkman, and with Silkman's failure to initially disclose his involvement in all the transactions in which he has received fees".

=== Middlesbrough ===
- Fábio Rochemback (Free transfer from Barcelona – 31 August 2005)
- Yakubu (£7.5 million from Portsmouth – 4 July 2005)

The statement relating to Zahavi and Silkman above also relates to the two Middlesbrough transfers.

=== Newcastle United ===
- Albert Luque (£8.5 million from Deportivo La Coruña – 26 August 2005)
- Emre Belözoğlu (£3.8 million from Inter Milan – 14 July 2005)
- Jean-Alain Boumsong (£8 million from Rangers – 1 January 2005)
- Amdy Faye (£2 million from Portsmouth – 25 January 2005)

"There remains inconsistencies in evidence provided by Graeme Souness – a former manager of the club – and Kenneth Shepherd” (son of the former Newcastle chairman Freddy Shepherd)“— apparently acting in an undefined role but not as a club official – as to their respective roles in transfer negotiations". Souness issued a statement denying any wrongdoing: "I cannot understand why my name features in this report. I volunteered full information to Quest as a witness and I have heard nothing further from them." The Stevens enquiry then issued a clarification: "We wish to make it clear that inconsistencies did not exist within the evidence given by Graeme Souness to Quest concerning his role in transfers covered by the Inquiry during his time as manager of Newcastle United FC and neither the Premier League nor do Quest have any concerns in this regard".

"The inquiry has been unable to obtain the co-operation of the agent Ahmet Bulut” in connection with the Emre transfer.

"The inquiry is still awaiting clarification from agent Willie McKay” in connection with the Boumsong and Faye transfers. However, Quest later issued the following statement: "Further to the key findings from the final Quest report published on 15 June 2007 by the Premier League, Quest would like to emphasise that, in that report, it was clear that no evidence of irregular payments was found in the transfers in the inquiry period which involved the agent Willie McKay. Quest would also like to thank Mr McKay for his cooperation with the inquiry."

In relation to the Luque transfer: "The inquiry still has unanswered questions relating to possible payments made by agent Francis Martin, who Newcastle officials believed was working for the selling club".

=== Portsmouth ===
- Collins Mbesuma (Free transfer from Kaizer Chiefs – 1 August 2005)
- Benjani Mwaruwari (£4.1 million from Auxerre – 6 January 2006)
- Aliou Cissé (£300,000 from Birmingham City – 6 August 2004)

"Agent Willie McKay acted for the selling club, Auxerre, in the transfer of Benjani and for Portsmouth in the transfer of Cisse and, for the same reason as above" (still awaiting clarification) "the inquiry is not prepared to clear these transfers at this stage". However, as mentioned above, the enquiry issued a further statement saying that no evidence of irregular payments had been found in the transfers in the inquiry period which involved McKay and thanking McKay for his co-operation.

"In relation to Benjani’s transfer, the inquiry also has identified concerns regarding the role of (agent) Teni Yerima and (third party) Ralph N’Komo.”

With regard to manager Harry Redknapp, his ownership of a racehorse named "Double Fantasy" thought to have been given to him by the agent Willie McKay, has aroused some suspicion. Redknapp told the inquiry that it was possible that he did own the horse but insisted that he had not made any money out of it because the horse was a failure and never won a race.

== November 2007 arrests ==
On 28 November 2007 it was reported by BBC News that the then Portsmouth manager, Harry Redknapp, Managing Director, Peter Storrie, former Portsmouth chairman, Milan Mandaric, former Portsmouth footballer Amdy Faye and agent Willie McKay had been arrested by City of London Police in relation to the ongoing inquiries into allegations of corruption in football.

== 2008 investigations ==
City of London Police continued an ongoing investigation in 2008, including a search of Birmingham City in March. Birmingham officials Karren Brady and David Sullivan were arrested, interviewed and released on bail in April; David Gold and Julia Shelton were interviewed in July. Pascal Chimbonda was released from bail in June, effectively clearing him of wrongdoing. The Guardian reported in June 2009, that both Kevin Bond and Harry Redknapp had dropped their libel cases against the BBC, shortly before the trial. Meaning the BBC's claims are now legally unchallenged.

When questioned on the subject, the FA stated that their own investigation was still ongoing, and any charges will probably wait until the government's own investigation into football corruption has concluded.

On 14 May 2008, The Football Association dropped one of the two charges it had brought against each of six players' agents relating to alleged breaches of rules in transfer dealings at Luton Town.

The F.A. has laid twelve charges against agents - two each against Sky Andrew, Mike Berry, Mark Curtis, Stephen Denos, and Andrew Mills.

The first charge was that payments were made to them by a third company, unrelated to the club and not by the club itself. All six had denied the charge and, eventually, after seven months of "investigation," the charge was dropped.

The other charge against each agent was that they did not have written agreements, a.k.a. "representation contracts," to act for the club when conducting negotiations. F.A. stated it is continuing with that one. Denos, Manasseh and Berry have admitted the charge but Andrew, Curtis and Mills denied it and requested personal hearings.

Agent Andrew Mills, who had never previously been charged with any disciplinary offence since he began as a FIFA-licensed agent in 1993, stated that he was disappointed by the "sensationalist coverage" of the case. "The headlines suggested there had been serious wrongdoing," Mills said. "It is now clear that was not the case."

== See also ==
- 2016 English football scandal
