= Júlio César (footballer, born November 1978) =

Brazilian footballer

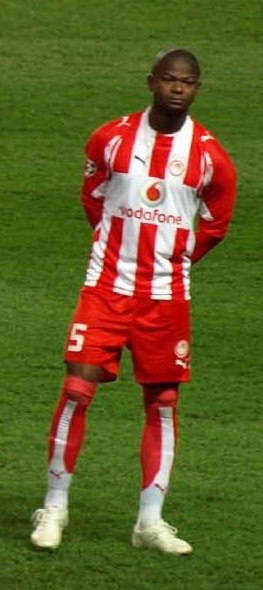
- César with Olympiacos in 2008

Personal information
- Full name: Júlio César Santos Correa
- Date of birth: 18 November 1978 (age 47)
- Place of birth: São Luís, Brazil
- Height: 1.85 m (6 ft 1 in)
- Position: Centre back

Youth career
- 1995: Club América

Senior career*
Years	Team	Apps	(Gls)
1995–1996	Marathón	17	(0)
1996–1999	Valladolid	60	(4)
1999–2002	Real Madrid	21	(0)
2000	→ Milan (loan)	4	(0)
2000–2001	→ Real Sociedad (loan)	16	(1)
2001–2002	→ Benfica (loan)	20	(3)
2002–2003	Austria Wien	9	(1)
2003–2004	Valladolid	28	(1)
2004–2005	Bolton Wanderers	5	(0)
2005–2006	Tigres	33	(6)
2006–2008	Olympiacos	45	(9)
2008	Dinamo București	10	(0)
2009–2010	Gaziantepspor	29	(1)
2010	Marítimo	0	(0)
2011–2012	Sporting Kansas City	58	(3)
2013	Toronto FC	0	(0)
2014	Parrillas One	7	(0)
Total		362	(28)

Managerial career
- 2019: Cristo Atlético
- 2019: Olimpik Donetsk
- 2023: Real Apodaca (Interim)
- * Club domestic league appearances and goals

Júlio César Santos Correa (Portuguese pronunciation: [ˈʒulju ˈsɛzɐʁ]; born 18 November 1978), known as Júlio César, is a Brazilian retired professional footballer who played mainly as a central defender, and a manager.

During a professional career that spanned two decades, he played for 16 clubs in 12 countries, but never in Brazil. In the Spanish La Liga, he amassed totals of 125 matches and six goals over six seasons, winning the Champions League with Real Madrid in 2000.

== Playing career ==
=== Early years ===
Júlio César was born São Luís, Maranhão. He played youth football in Mexico with Club América, and made his professional debut in Honduras with C.D. Marathón.

Aged 17, Júlio César signed with Spanish side Real Valladolid. He immediately began playing regularly (25 La Liga matches in his first season, helping his team finish seventh and qualify for the UEFA Cup), and attracting interest from bigger clubs.

=== Real Madrid ===
Júlio César was bought by Real Madrid in the summer of 1999, appearing regularly in his first year for a team which also included established stoppers Iván Helguera, Fernando Hierro and Aitor Karanka, as well as Iván Campo. He helped them to win the season's UEFA Champions League, although he did not make the list of 18 for the final itself.

After being loaned to A.C. Milan in October 2000, Júlio César quickly left the Italians unsettled, and he returned to Spain with Real Sociedad also on loan. The following off-season, he joined S.L. Benfica on yet another loan.

=== Bolton ===
After a one-year spell with FK Austria Wien, Júlio César returned to Valladolid in 2003, again being a starter but seeing the Castile and León side be relegated to Segunda División. He then moved to England's Premier League, signing with Bolton Wanderers.

Júlio César's debut came on 14 August 2004 in a 4–1 home victory over Charlton Athletic. However, after the next game, a 2–0 away defeat to Fulham, he found himself dropped from the starting line-up in favour of Tunisian international Radhi Jaïdi; he also sustained a broken foot against Manchester United at Old Trafford, on Boxing Day, which was his last appearance of the season.

Júlio César's transfer was one of those about which the Stevens enquiry report in June 2007 expressed concerns, because of the apparent conflict of interest between agent Craig Allardyce, his father Sam Allardyce – the Trotters' manager – and the club itself.

=== Professional journeyman ===
Júlio César joined Tigres UANL in 2005, and quickly became a key in the Mexican team's defense in both the Liga MX and the Copa Libertadores. He scored in the match dubbed "Aztecazo", a 4–1 turn-around win against Club América after a 3–1 home loss for the 2005 Apertura.

In July 2006, Júlio César moved to Olympiacos F.C. on a three-year contract. He scored five times from 27 appearances in his first year, being essential to the conquest of the Super League Greece championship. On 31 October 2006, he scored in a 1–1 away draw against A.S. Roma for Champions League group stage, but his team eventually ranked last.

In the following years, Júlio César represented FC Dinamo București (Romania) and Gaziantepspor (Turkey). Before agreeing to a one-and-a-half-year deal with the latter, he spoke with compatriot and former Real Madrid teammate Roberto Carlos, then at Fenerbahçe SK, asking him for information about the Süper Lig.

=== Sporting Kansas City ===
On 14 March 2011, after only a few weeks in Portugal with C.S. Marítimo, 32-year-old Júlio César signed for Major League Soccer club Sporting Kansas City. The terms of the contract were unknown, but general manager Peter Vermes stated that the seasoned veteran would be "a very nice addition to the back line this season".

César was released by Kansas City on 19 November 2012.

=== Toronto FC ===
On 14 January 2013, Júlio César joined Toronto FC. He was released two months later, after only appearing in one pre-season game; during his spell in North America, he was deployed mainly as a defensive midfielder.

== Coaching career ==
After retiring, Júlio César obtained his UEFA Pro licence as a manager. He also worked as an ambassador for the Real Madrid Foundation in Brazil.

In January 2019, Julio César was appointed head coach of Spanish amateurs CD Cristo Atlético in Palencia.

== Honours ==
Real Madrid

- UEFA Champions League: 1999–2000

Austria Wien

- Austrian Football Bundesliga: 2002–03

Tigres

- InterLiga: 2006

Olympiacos

- Super League Greece: 2006–07, 2007–08
- Greek Cup: 2007–08
- Greek Super Cup: 2007

Sporting Kansas City

- U.S. Open Cup: 2012
