= Blessing Kaku =

Nigerian footballer

Personal information
- Full name: Blessing Kaku
- Date of birth: 5 March 1978 (age 48)
- Place of birth: Ughelli, Nigeria
- Height: 1.80 m (5 ft 11 in)
- Position: Midfielder

Youth career
- 1994: Steel Pioneers

Senior career*
Years	Team	Apps	(Gls)
1996–1997	Sharks F.C.	0	(0)
1997–1998	SV Braunau	0	(0)
1998–1999	RWD Molenbeek	28	(0)
1999–2000	KRC Harelbeke	26	(5)
2000–2002	K.R.C. Genk	20	(0)
2002–2003	Hapoel Be'er-Sheva	42	(11)
2003–2004	F.C. Ashdod	19	(4)
2004	Bolton Wanderers	1	(0)
2005	Derby County	4	(0)
2005	Maccabi Tel Aviv	8	(1)
2006	F.C. Ashdod	18	(3)
2006–2008	Maccabi Petah Tikva	58	(4)
2008–2009	Enosis Neon Paralimni	11	(1)
Total		235	(29)

International career^{‡}
2000–2004	Nigeria	4	(0)
- * Club domestic league appearances and goals as of 30 October 2008 ‡ National team caps and goals as of 31 August 2006

Blessing Kaku (born 5 March 1978) is a former Nigerian international football player, who was a member of the national squad at the 2000 Summer Olympics in Sydney. He spent most of his time in Israel playing for multiple clubs (Hapoel Be'er Sheva, Maccabi Tel Aviv, F.C. Ashdod, Maccabi Petah Tikva). He also played for Cyprus-based club Enosis Neon Paralimni and Belgian side K.R.C. Genk. He also played in England for Bolton Wanderers, and Derby County but failed to make an impact in his short spells with both of the English clubs.

== Transfer Controversy ==
His transfer from F.C. Ashdod to Bolton Wanderers in August 2004 is mentioned in the Stevens inquiry report in June 2007, concerns were raised because of the apparent conflict of interest between agent Craig Allardyce and his father Sam Allardyce (Bolton manager at the time) and the club itself.
