= Peter Harrison (footballer) =

English footballer, manager, and agent

Personal information
- Full name: Michael Peter Harrison
- Date of birth: 14 August 1959 (age 67)
- Place of birth: Newcastle upon Tyne, England
- Position: Centre back

Youth career
- Nottingham Forest

Senior career*
Years	Team	Apps	(Gls)
- Nottingham Forest
–1982	Gateshead		
1982–1987	Charleroi		

Managerial career
- Hebburn
- 1995–1997: Blyth Spartans
- * Club domestic league appearances and goals

Michael Peter Harrison (born 14 August 1959) is an English former footballer, manager and football agent. In 2006, he came to the public's attention after being filmed by an undercover reporter for a Panorama documentary entitled "Undercover: Football's Dirty Secrets".

== Career ==
=== Playing and managerial career ===
Harrison had a reasonably short football career, playing for Nottingham Forest, Gateshead and Belgian side Charleroi. He then moved on to manage Hebburn, before taking a year out away from football.

In 1995, he was appointed as Harry Dunn's replacement at Blyth Spartans. Harrison kept the caretaker managers Tony Lowery and David McCreery on as part of the backroom staff, with the intention of Lowery being his assistant coach and McCreery in a consultant role. However, after a few weeks, Lowery joined Bedlington Terriers and McCreery took up a new role in the US to help promote the inaugural Major League Soccer season. Harrison brought in his former Gateshead teammate Derek Bell soon afterwards, in a player-assistant role. Harrison led the club to sixth place in the 1995–96 season. He could not replicate the same form the following season, and after one win in ten matches, he handed in his resignation after a 4–0 defeat to Leek Town. John Burridge, who was playing for the club at the time, became caretaker manager, and eventually, Harrison's successor.

=== Career as a football agent ===
As a football agent, he was responsible for Ali Dia's move to Gateshead, following the infamous 53-minute appearance for Southampton. Harrison was a friend of Gateshead's chairman John Gibson, and as the club were struggling to find players, he turned to Harrison, who suggested Dia. The Senegalese had played under Harrison, making one appearance for Blyth Spartans. He joined the Tynesiders, scoring two goals in eight matches, leaving in 1997, following a change of manager. Harrison later became a licensed FIFA football agent and represented many players including Lucas Neill, Ali Al-Habsi, Eiður Guðjohnsen, Jussi Jääskeläinen, Hidetoshi Nakata and Andy Carroll. He was also the agent of Rivaldo, who following his release from A.C. Milan, was linked with a move to Bolton Wanderers, but in the end, moved to Olympiacos.

In 2006, he was filmed by an undercover reporter for Panorama's "Undercover: Football's Dirty Secrets", and featured prominently in the documentary. Well known figures in football shown in the documentary include:

- Harry Redknapp, who discussed with Harrison on the possibility on buying Andy Todd. Redknapp later denied the conversation with Harrison amounted to "tapping up".
- Kevin Bond, who admitted he would consider discussing receiving payments from a proposed new agency involving Harrison. Bond later denied that he had taken a bung or had ever taken a bung. He was first team coach at Newcastle United at the time of broadcast, and was relieved of his duties following the revelations.
- Frank Arnesen, then-director of youth football at Chelsea, who was filmed "tapping up" Middlesbrough's Nathan Porritt and offers a fee of £150,000 spread over three years as an incentive to relocate. Both of these allegations are against FA rules. Harrison is shown to privately decline the offer and decides to look elsewhere. (Porritt ended up staying at Middlesbrough, but never made an appearance for the first team.)
- Sam Allardyce, who was allegedly bribed by Harrison, in regards with new signings to Bolton Wanderers, to pay his son Craig, also an agent, the money. Allardyce strenuously denies the allegations.

In a statement to the Evening Chronicle, Harrison said, "Have a good look at the programme and see where the bungs are. There aren't any. There is no film, no evidence of them happening at all; no money changes hands. I've been in football for a lot of years and I've never had anything at all to do with bungs and I wouldn't want to."

Harrison had previous dealings with Allardyce – in 2005, Allardyce loaned him and Lucas Neill £300,000 to fund a property development at Laverick Hall Farm, Gateshead into 14 homes, and the agreement was to repay Allardyce £600,000 plus interest, but the development was never built. The then-Bolton Wanderers manager took legal action against Harrison and Neill to recoup his money through the High Court in 2007, claiming some £650,000 plus interest and costs, and the pair conceded and agreed to repay it. In 2009, Harrison faced a bankruptcy hearing in which the court made the order for £782,000 – it had emerged that he has already paid back around £650,000.

In an interview with The Daily Mail, Harrison admitted taking advantage of the then-chairman of West Ham United, Eggert Magnússon, over the 2007 transfer of Neill to the Hammers. Neill was initially going to Liverpool, but West Ham United offered a better wage packet. At the time, Neill refuted that the transfer was monetary reasons, stating the move was for purely footballing reasons.

Harrison represented Andy Carroll since the age of 16, and successfully negotiated his first professional contract and subsequent deals at Newcastle United. However, Carroll had told him that he wanted to be represented by Kevin Nolan's agent Mark Curtis, a couple of months after signing a two-year contract with Harrison. In the aftermath of Carroll's £35 million transfer to Liverpool, the Reds used David Bromley, a little-known agent (although Carroll stated otherwise; he had taken advice from a solicitor, Richard Green). Bromley is an associate of Curtis, and Harrison had been reported to have sued Carroll for loss of earnings (as per FA rules), which was referred to arbitration. He also lost Jussi Jääskeläinen, then at West Ham United, to Curtis around this time.

Curtis has represented Allardyce for years, and was at odds with Harrison, following the Panorama documentary. In 2012, Harrison made a number of accusations on Twitter towards Curtis, Allardyce and Bolton Wanderers chairman and FA board member Phil Gartside. These actions resulted in a threat of legal action from the FA to protect Gartside.

He retired as a football agent later that year, after the FA arbitration panel found against him in the Andy Carroll deal.

=== Other interests ===
In 2010, Harrison was the public face behind the takeover of Olympic Charleroi, and was described as the general manager by the club's secretary and the president by the team coach. Although he appeared on Belgian TV outlining his plans for the club, his lawyers described him simply as an "ambassador" for Olympic, who merely "encouraged" players to sign. The club went into insolvency, struggled to pay bills and players' wages, and some young players become hungry and homeless. According to FIFA rules, an applicant for a players' agent licence may not hold a position at a club. Harrison declined to speak to the BBC over the matter.
