= Tal Ben Haim =

Israeli footballer (born 1982)

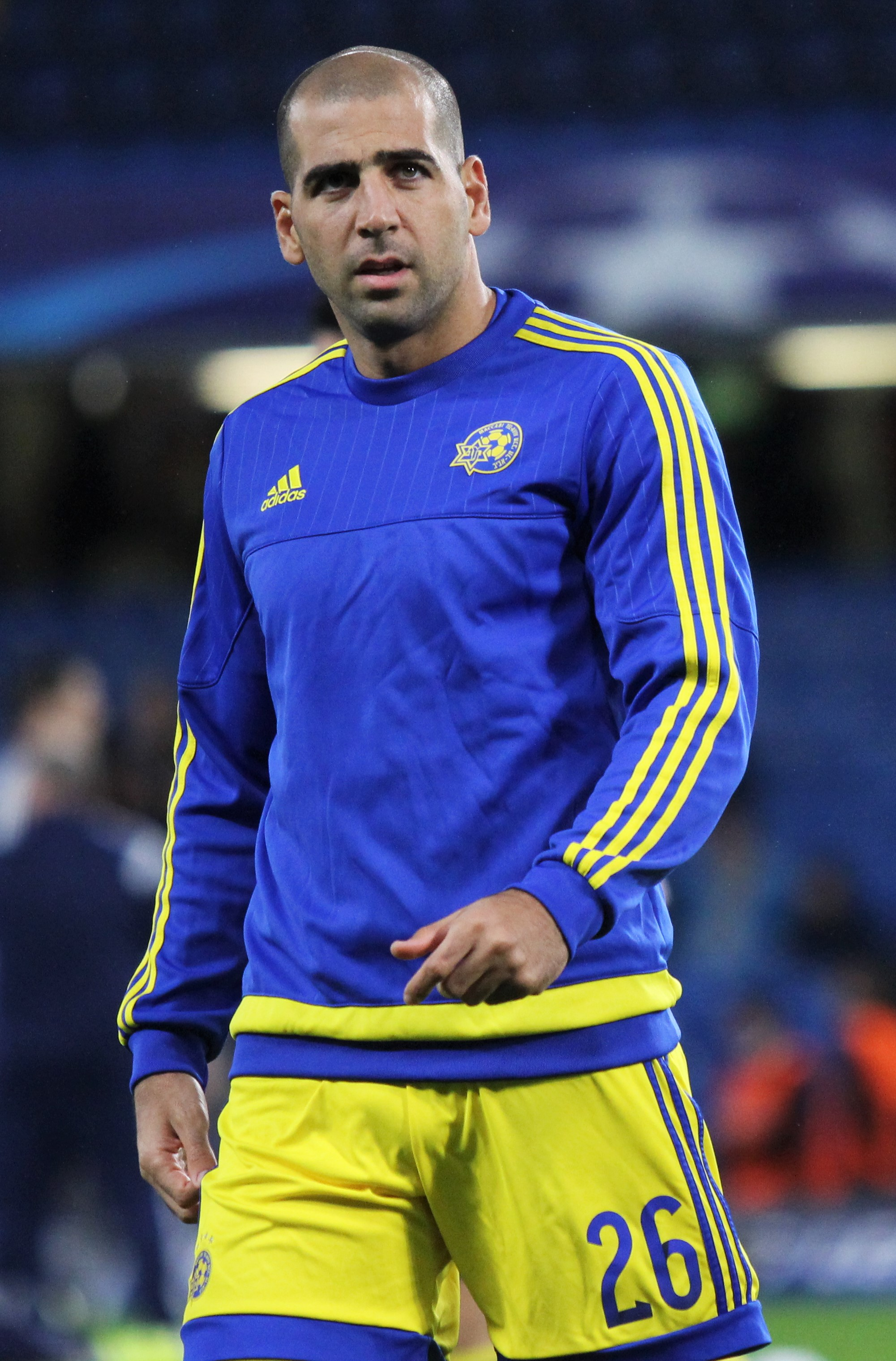
- Ben Haim warming-up for Maccabi Tel Aviv in 2015

Personal information
- Full name: Tal Ben Haim
- Date of birth: 31 March 1982 (age 44)
- Place of birth: Rishon LeZion, Israel
- Height: 1.83 m (6 ft 0 in)
- Positions: Centre back; right back

Youth career
- 1998–2001: Maccabi Tel Aviv

Senior career*
Years	Team	Apps	(Gls)
2001–2004	Maccabi Tel Aviv	85	(2)
2004–2007	Bolton Wanderers	87	(1)
2007–2008	Chelsea	13	(0)
2008–2009	Manchester City	9	(0)
2009	→ Sunderland (loan)	5	(0)
2009–2012	Portsmouth	55	(0)
2010–2011	→ West Ham United (loan)	8	(0)
2013	Queens Park Rangers	3	(0)
2013–2014	Standard Liège	10	(0)
2014–2015	Charlton Athletic	37	(0)
2015–2018	Maccabi Tel Aviv	63	(0)
2018–2021	Beitar Jerusalem	58	(0)
Total		433	(3)

International career
2001–2002	Israel U21	6	(0)
2002–2017	Israel	95	(2)
- * Club domestic league appearances and goals as of 25 May 2021

Tal Ben Haim (or Tal Ben Haim I, Hebrew: טל בן-חיים; born 31 March 1982) is an Israeli former professional footballer who played at either centre back or right back. He has played for Maccabi Tel Aviv, Bolton Wanderers, Chelsea, Manchester City, Sunderland, Portsmouth, West Ham United, Queens Park Rangers, Standard Liége, Beitar Jerusalem and Charlton Athletic.

== Early life ==
Ben Haim was born in Rishon LeZion, Israel, to a Jewish family.

== Club career ==
=== Maccabi Tel Aviv ===
Born in Rishon LeZion, Ben Haim joined the Maccabi Tel Aviv senior squads in 1998 as a reserve player. His league debut came on 30 April 2001 when he came on in the 90th minute as a substitute in the Tel Aviv derby match against Hapoel. Known for his adaptability, Ben Haim exhibits his skills both as a right back and a centre-back on the field. He played a significant part in Maccabi's Israeli Premier League title in the 2002–03 season, and was appointed club captain the following season, replacing Gadi Brumer who retired in mid-season.

=== Bolton Wanderers ===
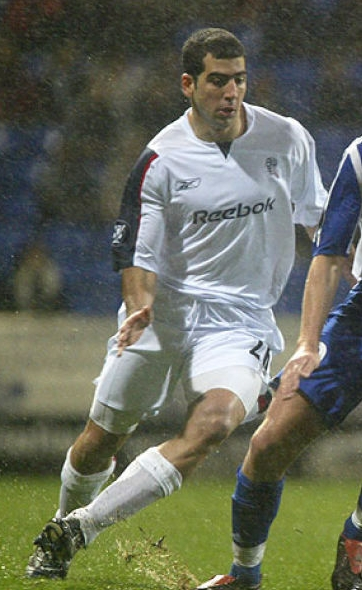
Ben Haim playing for Bolton in November 2005

After a two-week trial with Bolton Wanderers in the summer of 2004, Sam Allardyce secured the services of Ben Haim on a three-year deal for a fee believed to be in the region of £150,000.

His first season at the Reebok Stadium was a successful one as he made 27 appearances. On 1 February 2005, Ben Haim scored his first and only goal for Bolton, heading a free-kick from Stelios Giannakopoulos into the net in Bolton's 3–1 victory over Tottenham Hotspur. This is his only goal in the Premier League. His campaign was hampered in a league match, when Wayne Rooney appeared to shove him in the face. Ben Haim, alleged to have gone down too easily, was charged with improper conduct by the Football Association, but later cleared.

On 20 October 2005 while playing for Bolton in the UEFA Cup away at Beşiktaş, Ben Haim wore the captain's armband and was praised by the regular team captain Jay-Jay Okocha. In the second leg of the UEFA Cup Round of 32 against the French side Marseille which they drew 0–0 in the first leg, Ben Haim was the blame when he scored an own goal in the 69th minute which turned out to be a winner for Marseille as the result was 2–1 on 23 February 2006.

Ben Haim's defensive displays in his following seasons at Bolton had attracted the interests of many clubs including Chelsea, West Ham United and Tottenham Hotspur. In January 2007, Chelsea confirmed that talks to sign Ben Haim from Bolton were unsuccessful.

Following the end of the 2006–07 season, Ben Haim's contract with Bolton had expired and his future at Bolton was in doubt with media reports linking him with a move to Chelsea and Newcastle United, ex-Bolton boss Sam Allardyce admitting that he was ready to make an offer to his former charge to bring him to Newcastle.

The Stevens inquiry report in June 2007 expressed concerns about his move from Maccabi to Bolton, due to the apparent conflict of interest between agent Craig Allardyce, his father Sam Allardyce – the then manager at Bolton – and the club itself.

=== Chelsea ===
In June 2007, Chelsea officially announced the signing of Ben Haim on a Bosman transfer after he had passed his medical at Stamford Bridge and agreed on personal terms to join the club on a four-year deal. Ben-Haim told the Jewish Telegraph exclusively: "I am very happy to join one of the greatest clubs in the world. I needed a new challenge. I will play in any position Jose Mourinho wants me to play. I am looking forward to starting the new season with Champions League football."

He made his competitive debut for Chelsea against Manchester United in the FA Community Shield. With injuries to fellow Chelsea defenders John Terry and Ricardo Carvalho Ben Haim became a regular in the Chelsea first team. However, after the recovery of first team pairing Terry and Carvalho and the impressive form of Alex, Ben Haim found himself to be the fourth choice centre back.

In April 2008, he criticized Chelsea manager Avram Grant after Chelsea's 1–1 draw with Wigan Athletic stating: "If I knew Avram Grant was going to be the coach I would have signed for another club. It was Jose who brought me here and no one except he and I know the conversation we had when he tried to sign me the first time a year ago last January. The fact is while Jose was the coach I played most of the games and people who know me know that I would not have come here to be a reserve. I knew nothing good would come for me with Grant as Chelsea coach."

In a press conference, Avram Grant responded: "I don't think José promised Ben Haim he will play before John Terry, Carvalho and Alex. It is internal business but, in my opinion, if a player was wrong we need to deal with it — in our way, my way." Tal Ben Haim was fined two weeks wages, about £80,000.

During Ben Haim's stay at Chelsea, he made 13 Premier League appearances, before transferring to Manchester City.

=== Manchester City ===
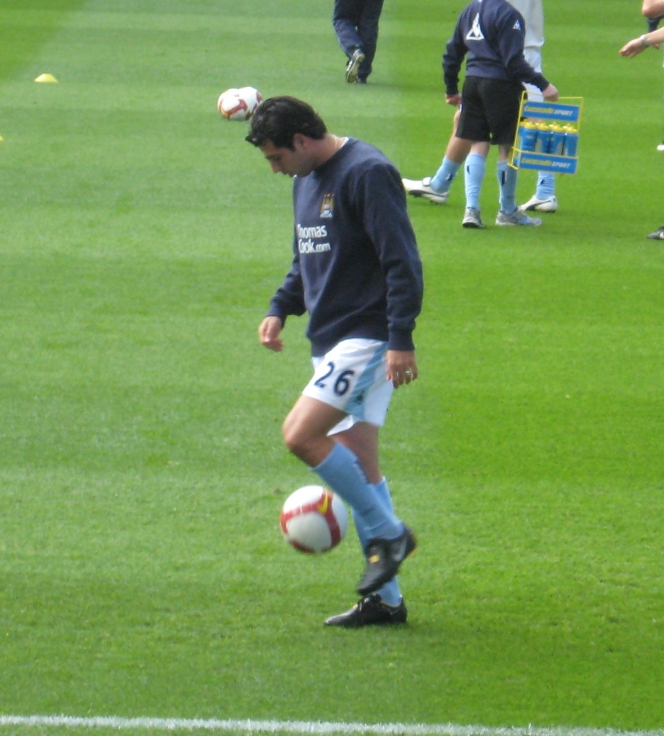
Ben Haim at Manchester City

Ben Haim joined City on 30 July 2008 for a fee around £5 million, becoming only the second first-team signing of new manager Mark Hughes.

He chose to wear the number 26 jersey, vacated by the transfer of Matthew Mills because, apart from his time at Chelsea where it was worn by John Terry, he had always worn that number at club level. After signing, Ben Haim said "I'm definitely going to give my best to City and give my heart in every game. I hope that we can do good things this season. I'm looking forward to starting the season here." Ben Haim made his City debut in second leg of the UEFA Cup qualifier against EB/Streymur at Barnsley's Oakwell Stadium on 31 July where City won 2–0. Ben Haim eventually made his league debut for Manchester City which he received a booking as Manchester City lost to Aston Villa 4–2 on 17 August 2008. He failed to establish himself as a first team regular, which saw him left on the substitutes bench for a long period of the season. After returning to the club, following a loan spell at Sunderland, it was clear that he was surplus to requirements at the City of Manchester Stadium. He was then transfer listed.

=== Sunderland (loan) ===
Ben Haim signed for Sunderland on loan until the end of the 2008–09 season on 1 February 2009. He made his debut away to Arsenal on 21 February and made his home debut at the Stadium of Light on 7 March against Tottenham Hotspur. He again found it difficult to break into the side. Ben-Haim was limited to only 5 appearances in a Sunderland shirt. At the end of the 2008–09 season, he returned to Manchester City.

=== Portsmouth ===
On 31 August 2009 it was announced that Portsmouth had signed Ben-Haim on a four-year deal. On 12 September 2009, Ben Haim made his league debut for the club in a 3–2 loss against his former club Bolton. Since then he has become one of the two first choice centre-backs under managers Paul Hart and his former manager at Chelsea, Avram Grant. He suffered an injury in the second half of the season, which kept him out of Portsmouth's FA Cup final game against Chelsea, which Pompey lost 1–0. On 20 December 2009 a match between Portsmouth and Liverpool which Portsmouth won 2–0, Ben Haim accused Liverpool striker Fernando Torres elbowing him during the match.

In May 2010, after Portsmouth had been relegated, Ben Haim opted to stay at Portsmouth although he had a relegation-release clause in his contract but declined the chance to activate it. He played for just one season for Portsmouth and made 24 appearances for the club in all competitions. Ben Haim criticised the club's former owners as they prepared for life in the Championship the following season and the cash issues did play a significant role in the club's demise. As the 2010/11 Championship campaign for Portsmouth was set to start, the club's administrator Andrew Andronikou wanted Ben Haim's crippling salary off the club's wage bill. West Ham and an unnamed Greek club were interested in signing him.

=== West Ham United (loan) ===
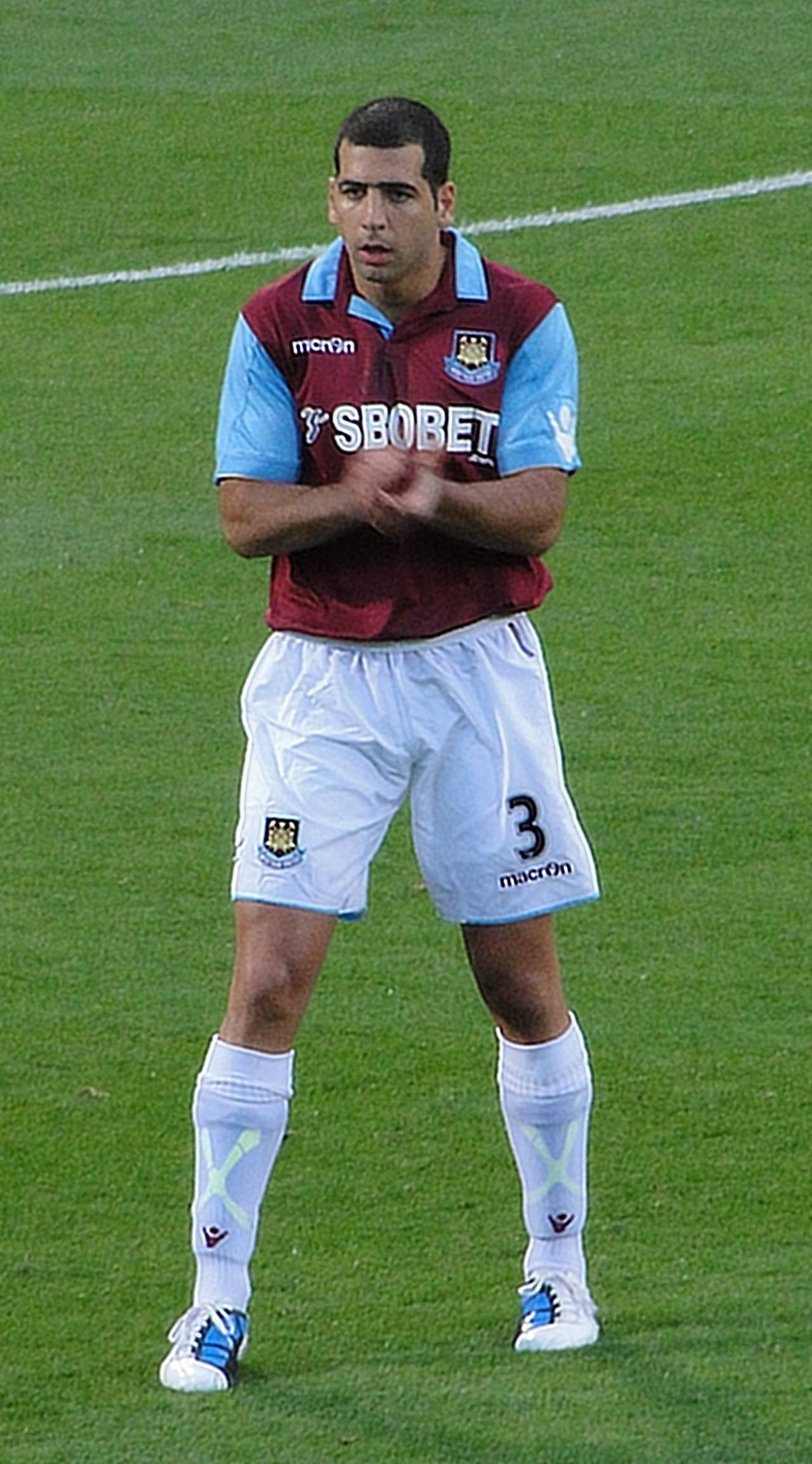
Ben Haim at West Ham United, August 2010

In July 2010, Ben Haim was set to join his ex-Portsmouth manager, Avram Grant at West Ham United on a free transfer, but it was reported that the move had collapsed after Ben Haim had failed a medical and Ben Haim's rumoured wage demands of £38,000-a-week. On 2 August 2010, the Israeli press reported that Ben Haim had agreed terms with West Ham on a three-year deal after passing a medical with Ben Haim considering legal action against the reporter who had published reports about his failed medical. He joined West Ham on 3 August 2010 on loan until January 2011 with a view to a permanent deal.

On 24 August 2010, Ben Haim played his first game for West Ham, against Oxford United in the League Cup, in a 1–0 victory and made his league debut for the club in a 3–1 loss against his former club Chelsea on 11 September 2010. On 1 January 2011 assisted Freddie Sears to score in a 2–0 win over Wolverhampton Wanderers. Four days later on 5 January 2011 he played for West Ham as they lost 5–0 to Newcastle United. This turned out his last appearance for West Ham. Despite his loan spell at West Ham having ended, the club continued talks with Portsmouth regarding a deal to bring Ben Haim back; the two clubs could not come to an agreement, while financial issues prevented him from linking up with Pompey.

=== Return to Portsmouth ===
In January 2011, Ben Haim returned to Portsmouth after his loan spell expired, but he did not make any appearances for Portsmouth that season, returning to training with the squad. He was in dispute with Portsmouth over £1.4million in unpaid wages. Because of this, manager Steve Cotterill was unable to select Ben Haim for the final fixtures of the 2010/11 season. The case was set to go to a Football League hearing in July 2011, but with new owners (CSI) installed at the club, Portsmouth were able to reach an acceptable agreement with Ben Haim.

On 11 July, Ben Haim made his first appearance for Portsmouth since the 2009–10 season in a 4–0 pre-season win over Havant & Waterlooville. On 6 August 2011, Ben Haim made his first league appearance in a 2–2 draw against Middlesbrough. On 27 August 2011, Ben Haim provided an assist to allow Nwankwo Kanu to score to make it 1–1 against Welsh side Cardiff City and also provided another assist the following week for Greg Halford to score the third goal in the match as Portsmouth lost 4–3 to his former club, West Ham. Later on in the 2011/12 season, Portsmouth would go into administration for the second time in two years, bringing them an automatic 10-point deduction. An arrest warrant was issued for Vladimir Aleksandrovich Antonov and Portsmouth were issued a winding up petition by HMRC for over £1.6 million in unpaid taxes, which was heard on 20 February.

The end of the 2011–12 season saw Portsmouth get relegated from the Championship, after which Ben Haim's agent, Pini Zahavi, stated that he would not play in League One despite having one year remaining on his deal, worth around £2 million. However, Zahavi later stated that he was in the dark over Ben Haim's future. Ben Haim's contract was criticized by administrator Trevor Birch because he was offered £36,000-a-week over four years, shortly before the club first went into liquidation. However, due to administration the maximum the club paid any player at that time was just £5,000-a-week. In response, Ben Haim refused to take a letter from a supporters group asking them to waive their wages and has suggested that the administrator takes a pay cut instead. He came to an agreement to leave the club in August 2012.

=== Queens Park Rangers ===
On 4 January 2013, Ben Haim joined Queens Park Rangers on a short-term contract deal. He made his debut the next day in an FA Cup match against West Bromwich Albion, where he provided an assist for a late equaliser from Kieron Dyer to make the result 1–1. On 9 May 2013, Canadian side Toronto FC of Major League Soccer announced they had acquired Ben Haim on loan from Queens Park Rangers. However, four days later, Toronto FC GM Kevin Payne said that Ben Haim never officially signed for the club as originally announced, and never ended up joining the team.

He was released by Queens Park Rangers at the end of the 2012–13 season. He continued training with the club for a short time after his release however, and appeared in a pre-season friendly against Exeter City on 11 July 2013.

=== Standard Liège ===
On 24 July 2013, Ben Haim signed for Belgian side Standard Liège on a two-year contract, following his release from Queens Park Rangers. However, Ben Haim made ten appearances for the club after losing his first team place to Dino Arslanagic.

=== Charlton Athletic ===
On 11 July 2014, Ben Haim signed for Charlton Athletic on a one-year deal, with the Addicks becoming his eighth English club. Upon the move, Ben Haim was given number twenty-six shirt. Ben Haim started in the opening game of the season, in a 1–1 draw against Brentford. On 12 May 2015, Ben Haim was released at the end of his contract.

=== Return to Maccabi Tel Aviv ===
On 3 June 2015, Ben Haim signed a two-year contract with his former club and current Israeli champions Maccabi Tel Aviv. On 25 August, he qualified with Maccabi to the Champions League group stage after passing FC Basel in the Play-offs round.

On 24 November 2015, Ben Haim was sent off in a 4–0 defeat by his former club Chelsea in the Champions League group stage.

=== Beitar Jerusalem F.C ===
On 7 August 2018, Ben Haim signed a two-year contract with Beitar Jerusalem F.C. He has since played 46 times for the club. on 7 August 2020, it was announced that the player has extended his contract with the club for one more year.

== International career ==
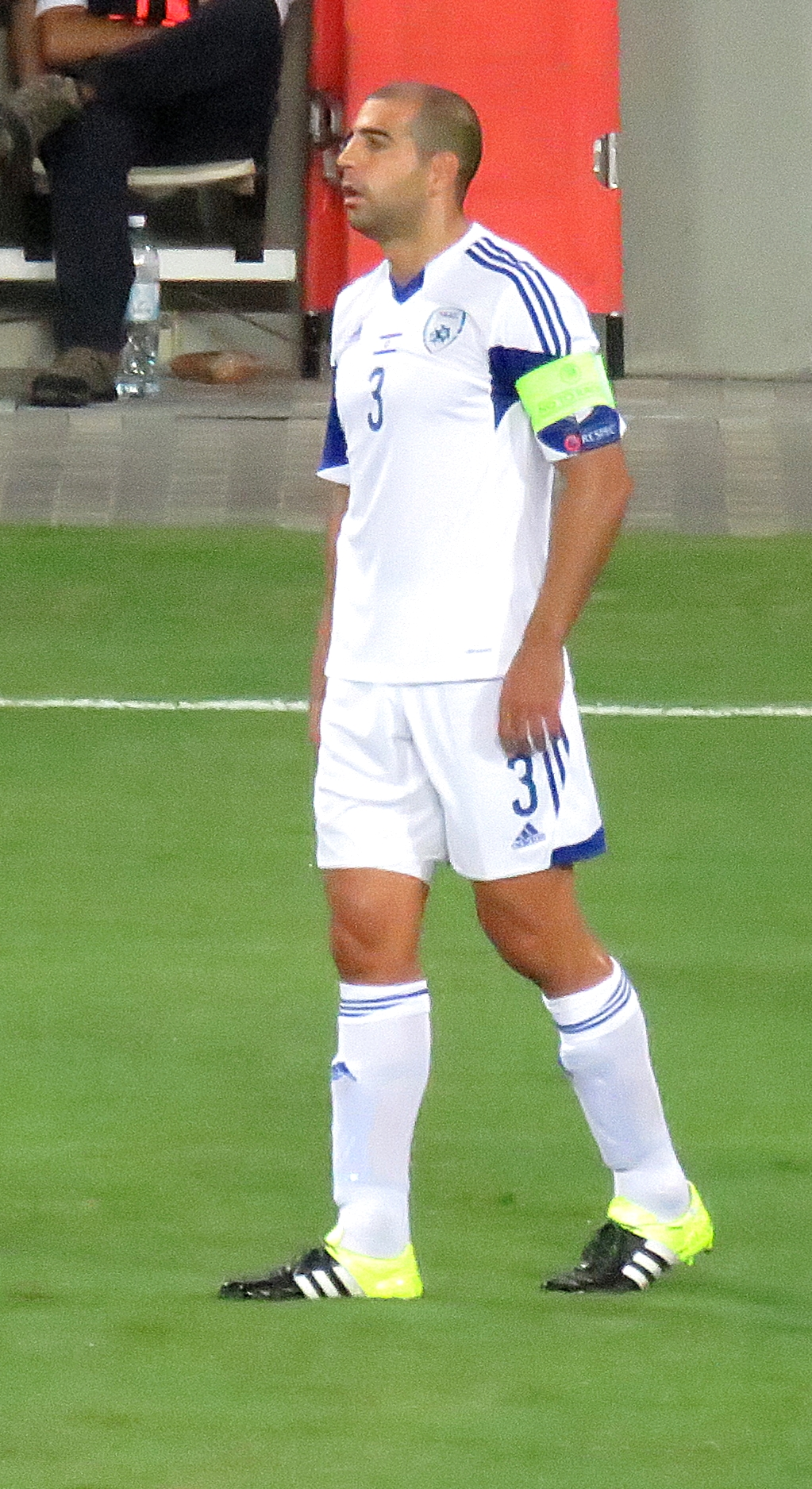
Ben Haim as the captain of Israel in 2015

Ben Haim made his debut in the Israel national team on 13 February 2002 in a friendly match against Germany. He scored his first goal from a penalty in a 2–1 win against Latvia on 4 June 2011.

== Personal life ==
He has exactly the same name as winger, Tal Ben Haim, who also played for Israel and Maccabi Tel Aviv, and he is referred to in UEFA reports as Tal Ben Haim I, while Tal Ben Haim II wears a jersey with his surname spelled as Ben Chaim to distinguish him from his fellow countryman.

== Honours ==
Portsmouth

- FA Cup runner-up: 2009–10

== See also ==
- List of select Jewish football (association; soccer) players

Sporting positions
Preceded by Yossi Benayoun	Israel national football team captain 2014–2016	Succeeded by Eran Zahavi
