= 1995–96 Blackpool F.C. season =

English football club season

Blackpool F.C.
1995–96 season
- Owner: Owen Oyston (until 22 May); Vicki Oyston (from 22 May)
- Manager: Sam Allardyce
- Stadium: Bloomfield Road
- Division Two: 3rd
- FA Cup: Third round
- League Cup: First round
- Top goalscorer: Tony Ellis & Andy Preece (14)

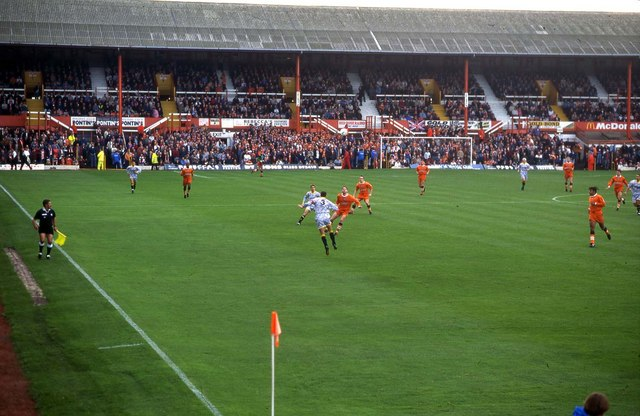
Blackpool hosting Oxford United on 28 October

The 1995–96 season was Blackpool F.C.'s 88th season (85th consecutive) in the Football League. They competed in the 24-team Division Two, then the third tier of English league football, finishing third, their highest league finish since the 1976–77 season. They made the end-of-season play-offs, but lost to Chris Kamara's Bradford City at the semi-finals stage. They won the first leg 2–0, but lost 3–0 in the return leg at Bloomfield Road, a result that cost Sam Allardyce his job, in his second season. In 2020, Andy Preece stated that the majority of the playing staff suffered a major dose of complacency after the first leg of the semi-final. "There was a feeling all around the club that we were there. Even in the programme they put directions for Wembley. Bradford probably picked up on a lot of that."

Tony Ellis was the club's top scorer in the league for the second consecutive season, tied with Andy Preece on fourteen goals apiece.

== Table ==
Pos	Team	Pld	W	D	L	GF	GA	GD	Pts	Promotion or relegation
1	Swindon Town (C, P)	46	25	17	4	71	34	+37	92	Promotion to the First Division
2	Oxford United (P)	46	24	11	11	76	39	+37	83	Promotion to the First Division
3	Blackpool	46	23	13	10	67	40	+27	82	Qualification for the Second Division play-offs
4	Notts County	46	21	15	10	63	39	+24	78	Qualification for the Second Division play-offs
5	Crewe Alexandra	46	22	7	17	77	60	+17	73	Qualification for the Second Division play-offs

(C) Champions; (P) Promoted
