= 2016 English football scandal =

Sports corruption scandal

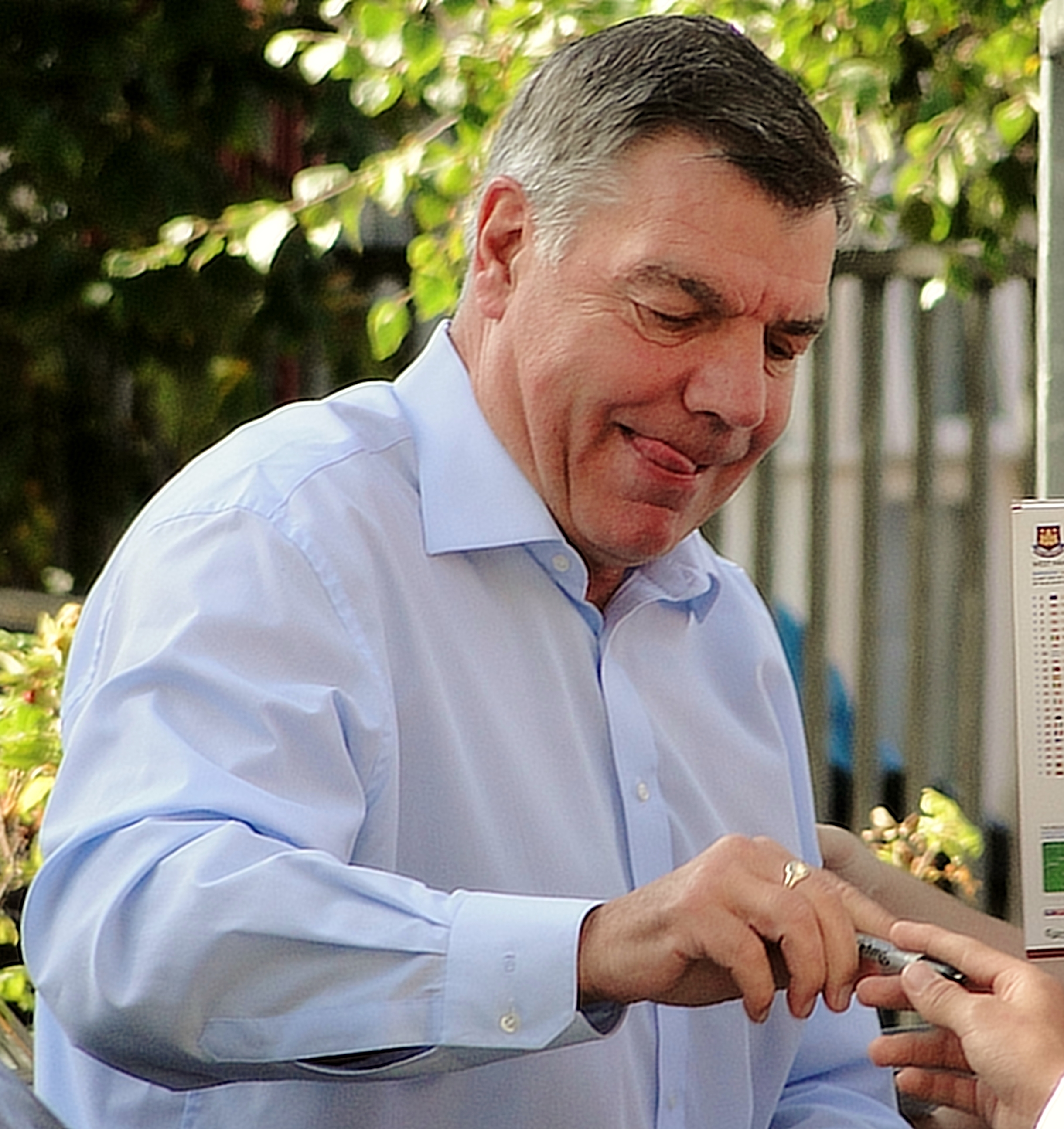
Sam Allardyce resigned as England national football team manager following the scandal

The 2016 English football scandal was a sports corruption scandal which began on 26 September 2016 following the publishing of the first part of the Daily Telegraph newspaper's "Football for Sale" investigation into corruption in English football. It resulted in the resignation of England national football team manager Sam Allardyce after only one game in charge, as well as the sacking or suspension of numerous English Football League club staff, including Barnsley assistant manager Tommy Wright.

== Events ==
On 26 September 2016, the Daily Telegraph published footage filmed by undercover reporters in which then England manager Sam Allardyce is shown speaking with fictitious Asian businessmen, detailing how to get around FIFA and Football Association (FA) bans on third-party ownership of football players, before making derogatory comments about former England assistant manager Gary Neville and previous England manager Roy Hodgson. Allardyce subsequently spoke about HM Revenue and Customs, calling them the "most corrupt business in the world", Allardyce himself having been caught up in alleged tax fraud schemes in the past.

Following the revelations by the Telegraph, the FA and Allardyce agreed on 27 September for him to resign as England manager with immediate effect by mutual consent, with Gareth Southgate being named as caretaker manager. Following Allardyce's departure, the Telegraph published further details of much wider-reaching corruption through English club football, claiming that eight Premier League managers accepted "bungs" for player transfers.

On 27 September, the Telegraph revealed that the Barnsley assistant manager Tommy Wright had taken a £5,000 "bung" in order to arrange for the club to purchase part-owned players from a fictitious East Asian firm. He was initially suspended by Barnsley as they launched an investigation into the allegations; he was sacked on 28 September. On 28 September, it was claimed by the Telegraph that Queens Park Rangers manager Jimmy Floyd Hasselbaink had agreed to become an ambassador for a fictitious East Asian sports company involved in third-party ownership of players in exchange for £55,000, subsequently also discussing potential tax avoidance involving his bank account in the Netherlands. Hasselbaink denied the claim, although he admitted he had been naive, and was supported by Queens Park Rangers after their internal investigation. Leeds United chairman Massimo Cellino was shown on video agreeing to sell 20% of the club in order to work around third-party player ownership rules.

On 29 September, the Telegraph released further footage from their investigation, alleging to show the assistant manager of Southampton, Eric Black, advising fictitious businessmen on how to bribe lower-league clubs. Additionally, Jimmy Houtput, chairman of Belgian First Division B club Oud-Heverlee Leuven, allegedly offered his club as a "conduit" in order to aid third-party companies in gaining ownership of football players in England. Houtput resigned as OH Leuven chairman the following day.

== Reaction ==
Then Wales manager Chris Coleman commented that corruption in the football industry should be punished by lifetime bans for the perpetrators. Former player and pundit Alan Shearer was particularly critical, claiming he "didn't think England could stoop any lower" following the England team's 2–1 loss to Iceland during UEFA Euro 2016 three months earlier, and called the team "a laughing stock of world football".

== Aftermath ==
Robert Sullivan, Director of Strategy at the FA, later confirmed to the Commons Culture, Media and Sport Select Committee that Allardyce's comments were "a factual, correct statement around the laws of the English game and having third-party ownership".

Following a review by City of London Police, Allardyce was cleared of any wrongdoing, the Telegraph also clarifying that it "did not suggest that Allardyce had broken the law", though he agreed that he had been "a fool". However, a criminal investigation was launched into Tommy Wright. He was convicted of soliciting and accepting bribes in December 2019. Speaking to the Observer, Martin Glen, CEO of the FA, said that "it is a tragedy that we have ended up having to part company with him [Allardyce] over the, the – you know – entrapment".
