= Jim Turney =

English footballer and manager

Personal information
- Full name: James Allan Turney
- Date of birth: 8 July 1922
- Place of birth: Seaton Sluice, England
- Date of death: 8 July 1995 (aged 73)
- Place of death: North Tyneside, England
- Position: Winger

Senior career*
Years	Team	Apps	(Gls)
–	Blyth Shipyard		
–	Blackhall CW		
1948–1950	Darlington	40	(3)
1950–19??	Blyth Spartans		

Managerial career
- 1957–1967: Blyth Spartans
- * Club domestic league appearances and goals

James Allan Turney (8 July 1922 – 8 July 1995) was an English footballer who made 40 appearances in the Football League playing as a winger for Darlington. He previously played non-league football for Blyth Shipyard and Blackhall Colliery Welfare, and went on to play for Blyth Spartans, eventually spending ten years as manager and becoming long serving chairman.
