= Harry Dunn (footballer, born 1953) =

English footballer and manager

Personal information
- Date of birth: 5 September 1953 (age 73)
- Place of birth: County Durham, England
- Position: Midfielder

Youth career
- Burnley
- Derby County

Senior career*
Years	Team	Apps	(Gls)
1971–1975	Bishop Auckland		
1975–1981	Scarborough	265	(65)
1981–1983	Blyth Spartans		
1983–1989	Bishop Auckland		

Managerial career
- 1989–1993: Bishop Auckland
- 1995: Blyth Spartans
- 1995–2004: Whitby Town
- 2004–2009: Blyth Spartans
- 2009–2010: Whitby Town
- * Club domestic league appearances and goals

Harry Dunn (born 5 September 1953), also referred to as Harry A. Dunn, is an English football manager and former player.

As a player, he played as a midfielder, beginning and ending his career with Bishop Auckland, with spells with Scarborough and Blyth Spartans in between. As a manager, he began his career with Bishop Auckland, before having two spells with Blyth Spartans and Whitby Town.

== Background and playing career ==
Dunn was born in County Durham, raised in the village of East Howle before attending school in Durham. At the age of 12, Dunn was involved with the youth team of Burnley for four years, before joining Derby County's academy set-up.

His debut with hometown club Bishop Auckland was in 1971, and he joined Scarborough in 1975 with whom he gained two FA Trophy winners medals, having scored in the 1977 final at Wembley against Dagenham. He made 265 appearances for Scarborough in all competitions, scoring 65 goals.

He is sometimes confused with another long-standing Scarborough player also named Harry Dunn, who made over 900 appearances for the club and was already at the club before Dunn joined from Bishop Auckland. To avoid confusion, the new signing was given the fictitious middle initial "A" to differentiate between the two players. Therefore, to Scarborough fans he has always been known as Harry A. Dunn. It was the original Harry Dunn who managed Scarborough in 1982, and between 1984 and 1986, and was clubman of the year in 1970 and 1974, and not Harry A. Dunn as it is often reported.

Dunn joined Blyth Spartans in 1981, winning a Northern League Championship medal, before rejoining Bishop Auckland in 1983.

== Managerial career ==
From 1989 to 1993, he was manager of Bishop Auckland, until he left the club to join Phil Staley at Fleetwood Town. In 1995, he left to manage Blyth Spartans. However, he did not stay long at Croft Park as he was appointed as manager of Whitby Town in December 1995, steering the Blues to their first-ever promotion from the Northern League in 1997. Dunn then won the FA Vase, at Wembley, days later. Town were promoted again a year on, to the Northern Premier League Premier Division, but he was sacked in September 2004 after a poor start to the campaign, months after missing out in a play-off tournament for the newly-formed Conference North. He returned to Blyth the following month.

On 8 November 2008, his Blyth Spartans side defeated League Two club Shrewsbury Town 3–1, in the first round of the FA Cup. They went on to defeat League Two club Bournemouth 1–0 in a second round replay at Croft Park, before losing 1–0 to Premier League club Blackburn Rovers on the same ground in the third round, a game which Dunn refused to be moved to Newcastle United's St James' Park. Alongside his managerial duties for Blyth, Dunn worked in a caretaking capacity for a Durham nursing home. On 27 April 2009, Blyth confirmed that the club would not be renewing Dunn's contract.

Dunn was re-appointed as manager of Whitby Town in May 2009, before resigning on 4 October 2010.

He was appointed as chief scout at Darlington 1883 in June 2012. In October 2017, Dunn followed Martin Gray to York City as chief scout, and also headed transfer policy and "assessment of forthcoming opponents". He was replaced as York City's chief scout by Peter Whinham by the start of the 2018–19 season.

Dunn was appointed chief scout at Bishop Auckland in July 2021.
