= Sam Allardyce =

English footballer and manager (born 1954)

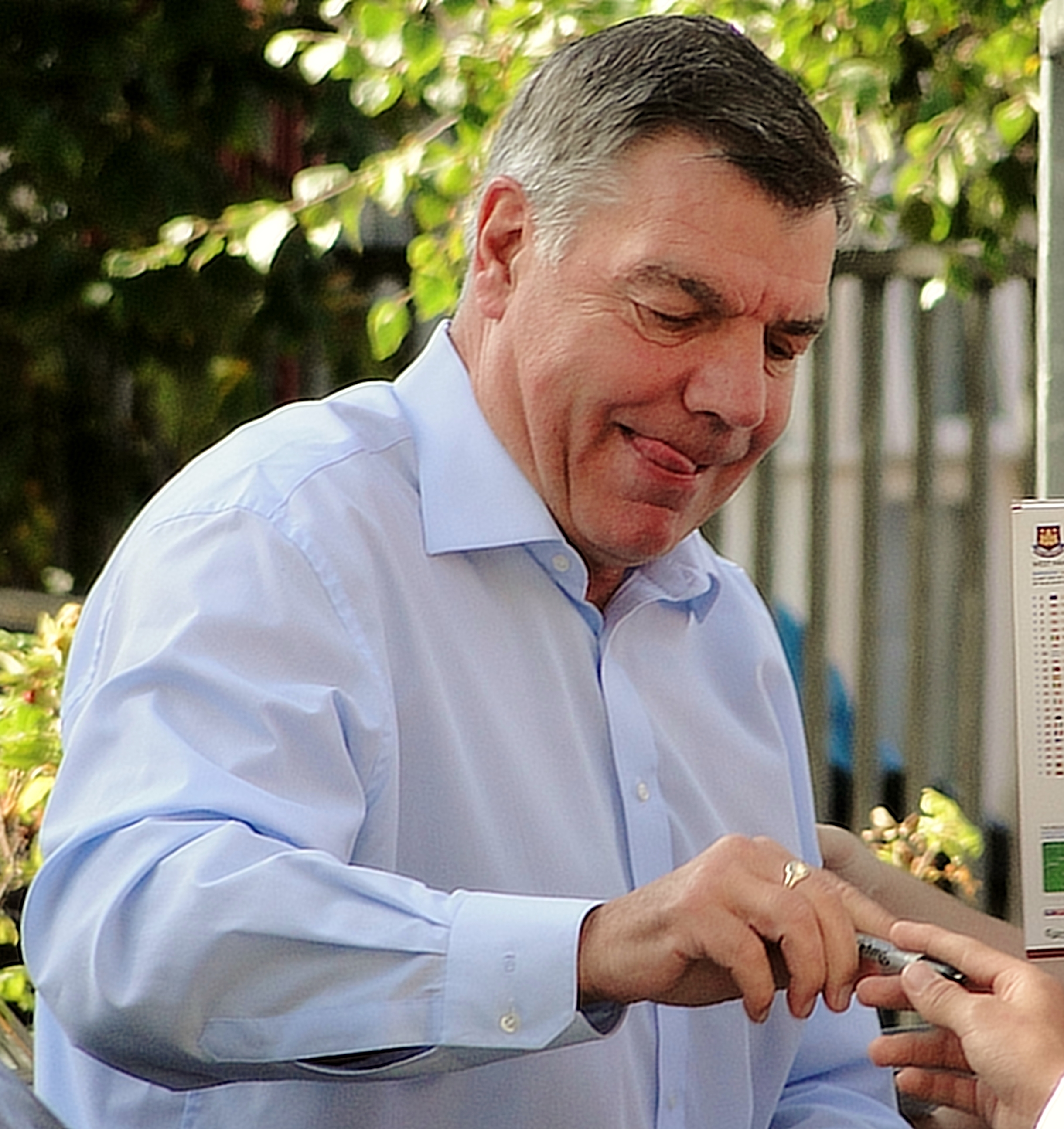
- Allardyce in 2014

Personal information
- Full name: Samuel Allardyce
- Date of birth: 19 October 1954 (age 72)
- Place of birth: Dudley, England
- Height: 6 ft 3 in (1.91 m)
- Position: Defender

Youth career
- 1968–1969: Dudley Town
- 1969–1971: Bolton Wanderers

Senior career*
Years	Team	Apps	(Gls)
1971–1980	Bolton Wanderers	184	(21)
1980–1981	Sunderland	25	(2)
1981–1983	Millwall	63	(2)
1983	Tampa Bay Rowdies	11	(1)
1983–1984	Coventry City	28	(1)
1984–1985	Huddersfield Town	37	(0)
1985–1986	Bolton Wanderers	14	(0)
1986–1989	Preston North End	90	(2)
1989–1991	West Bromwich Albion	1	(0)
1991–1992	Limerick	23	(3)
1992	Preston North End	3	(0)
Total		479	(32)

Managerial career
- 1991–1992: Limerick (player-manager)
- 1992: Preston North End (caretaker)
- 1994–1996: Blackpool
- 1997–1999: Notts County
- 1999–2007: Bolton Wanderers
- 2007–2008: Newcastle United
- 2008–2010: Blackburn Rovers
- 2011–2015: West Ham United
- 2015–2016: Sunderland
- 2016: England
- 2016–2017: Crystal Palace
- 2017–2018: Everton
- 2020–2021: West Bromwich Albion
- 2023: Leeds United
- * Club domestic league appearances and goals

Samuel Allardyce (born 19 October 1954) is an English football manager and former professional player. Also known as "Big Sam", Allardyce made 578 league and cup appearances in a 21-year career spent mostly in the Football League, as well as brief spells in the North American Soccer League and League of Ireland. He was signed by Bolton Wanderers from Dudley Town in 1969 and spent nine years at Bolton, helping the club to win the Second Division title in 1977–78. He spent the 1980s as a journeyman player, spending time with Sunderland, Millwall, Tampa Bay Rowdies, Coventry City, Huddersfield Town, Bolton Wanderers (for a second spell), Preston North End, and West Bromwich Albion (also working as assistant manager). During this time, he helped Preston win promotion out of the Fourth Division in 1986–87.

Moving into management, he took charge of Irish club Limerick in 1991, leading the club to the League of Ireland First Division (second tier) title in 1991–92. He returned to England as a youth coach at Preston North End and served briefly as caretaker-manager. He took up his first permanent management role in England at Blackpool in July 1994 but was dismissed after two years, having narrowly failed to achieve promotion. He spent January 1997 to October 1999 in charge at Notts County, taking them to the Third Division title in 1997–98. He then returned to Bolton Wanderers as manager, leading the club to promotion out of the First Division via the play-offs in 2001, as well as a League Cup final and UEFA Cup qualification on two occasions.

Following a spell at Newcastle United from May 2007 to January 2008, Allardyce managed Blackburn Rovers for two years from December 2008. He was appointed West Ham United manager in June 2011, leading the club to promotion out of the Championship via the play-offs in 2012 before leaving West Ham in May 2015 after criticism from fans over his playing style. He was appointed Sunderland manager in October 2015, saving the club from relegation. He was appointed as manager of the England national team for a brief spell in July 2016 before taking charge at Crystal Palace five months later. After helping Palace avoid relegation that season, he resigned in May 2017. He has since had spells as manager at Everton from 2017 to 2018, West Bromwich Albion from 2020 to 2021, and Leeds United in May 2023.

Some analysts have labelled Allardyce a long ball manager, though he has disputed this perception as "totally and utterly wrong". He takes a modern technology—and statistics-centred approach to tactics and coaching and has been praised for his organizational and man-management skills. Allardyce has faced allegations of misconduct in two separate undercover media investigations, though he denied wrongdoing and was ultimately not charged in either case. In September 2006, he and his son, Craig, were implicated in a BBC Panorama documentary for taking bribes, allegations which they denied. In September 2016, undercover Daily Telegraph reporters posing as businessmen recorded him offering to help them to get around FA third party ownership rules and provisionally agreeing a £400,000 contract. Following the Daily Telegraph investigation, Allardyce resigned as England manager in a mutual agreement with the Football Association on 27 September.

== Early life ==
Samuel Allardyce was born on 19 October 1954 on the Old Park Farm Estate, Dudley, the son of Robert Allardyce (27 April 1916 – 23 August 1989) and Mary Agnes Maxwell Allardyce née Duff (7 June 1918 – 3 July 1991). His father was a police sergeant. Both parents originated from Scotland: his father from Nairn and his mother from Dumfries. He has an older sister, Mary, born in Scotland in 1939, and an older brother, Robert Junior, born in 1951. Allardyce was educated at Sycamore Green Primary School and later at Mons Hill School, having been unsuccessful in his Eleven-plus exam. He discovered in later life that he has dyslexia. As a child, he supported Wolverhampton Wanderers and dreamed that one day he would play at and manage the club.

== Club career ==
=== Bolton Wanderers ===
Allardyce spent his youth with semi-professional side Dudley Town, making his debut at 14. He quickly learned how to play centre-half in the highly physical West Midlands (Regional) League. He trained with local Football League clubs West Bromwich Albion and Wolverhampton Wanderers. He had an unsuccessful trial with Aston Villa. He was spotted by Bolton Wanderers just before leaving school at the age of 15 and signed an apprenticeship with the club. To supplement his income before officially starting his apprenticeship he worked in a factory producing record decks. The Bolton under-18s were very successful, winning the Lancashire Youth Cup and reaching the quarter-finals of the FA Youth Cup, and Allardyce quickly rose through the B-team into the A-team. He signed his first professional contract on his 17th birthday, receiving a £125 signing on fee and wages of £14 a week.

Manager Jimmy Armfield gave Allardyce his debut for the "Trotters" on 6 November 1973, in a 2–1 League Cup defeat to Millwall at Burnden Park. He made his Second Division debut eleven days later, in a 2–1 defeat to Notts County. However he failed to establish himself in the first team under Armfield, and only got a run of games under new manager Ian Greaves, who played Allardyce in the last ten games of the 1974–75 season after he sold Don McAllister to Tottenham Hotspur. He impressed during this short run, winning himself the club's Young Player of the Year award.

Bolton lost to Newcastle United after two replays in the FA Cup Fifth Round in the 1975–76 season, and went on to miss out on promotion out of the league by a single point. They were similarly disappointed in the 1976–77 campaign, reaching the semi-finals of the League Cup, and again finished just one point outside the promotion places. Allardyce played alongside Paul Jones at centre-half, and a scouting report for England manager Don Revie in 1977 described Allardyce and Jones as "one of the best central defensive pairings in the Football League." Despite this, however, he was never called up to the England team. Promotion was finally achieved in the 1977–78 season, as Bolton returned to the First Division as champions of the Second Division. Bolton consolidated their top-flight status with a 17th-place finish in 1978–79. However the 1979–80 season proved difficult, and manager Greaves was dismissed as the club went seven months without a league victory, whilst his replacement Stan Anderson was unable to steer the club away from relegation and a last-place finish. Allardyce decided to leave Bolton at the end of the season as he felt that he was underpaid at Bolton and did not get on with Anderson.

=== Sunderland and Millwall ===
Allardyce was offered a contract by Norwich City manager John Bond. The offer was bettered by Colin Addison at Derby County, and he verbally agreed a three-year contract with Derby. However, before signing the contract, he received a late offer from Ken Knighton to play for Sunderland on a £300 a week contract with a £20,000 signing on fee – which more than quadrupled his wage at Bolton. Allardyce signed for Sunderland on 1 July 1980 for £150,000. Knighton appointed him as club captain. However, Allardyce soon wearied of the long-distance travel from Sunderland to his home in Bolton, and put in a transfer request when chairman Tom Cowie refused to help finance the purchase of a home in Sunderland. Cowie dismissed Knighton late in the 1980–81 season, leaving caretaker manager Mick Docherty in charge to steer the club out of the First Division relegation zone. New manager Alan Durban left Allardyce out of the team at the start of the 1981–82 campaign, leaving Allardyce's departure from Roker Park inevitable.

He was offered the chance to return to Bolton Wanderers, but manager George Mulhall was only able to offer 50% of Allardyce's wages at Sunderland. Instead he made a surprise £95,000 move to Third Division side Millwall, who were able to match Sunderland's wages and also pay out a £30,000 signing on fee and a £10,000 loyalty bonus. Millwall player-manager Peter Anderson had seen Allardyce as the successor to long-serving central defender Barry Kitchener, and as Anderson was also a property developer he allowed Allardyce to live rent free in a six-bedroom mansion. The "Lions" ended the 1981–82 season in mid-table, and Anderson was dismissed in November 1982. Chairman Alan Thorne offered Allardyce the vacant management position, but Allardyce rejected the offer as he felt that at aged 28 he was far too young to enter management. Instead it was George Graham who took up his first management position, and Graham immediately froze Allardyce out of the first team on both matchdays and training after Allardyce insisted that he would not report teammates who broke Graham's rules. He came close to joining Charlton Athletic on a free transfer in March 1983, but Charlton boss Lennie Lawrence did not complete the move before the end of the transfer deadline. Graham agreed to pay Allardyce £15,000 to cancel his contract, acting under the assumption that Allardyce would struggle to find a club willing to offer him £300 a week.

=== Later career ===
Allardyce wrote to every club in the top two divisions to inform them he was available on a free transfer and privately lamented choosing his past clubs for financial rather than footballing reasons. Over the summer he played 11 games in the North American Soccer League for the Tampa Bay Rowdies, a club that shared facilities with the NFL's Tampa Bay Buccaneers. Allardyce subsequently applied in his managerial career many modern practices of American football with regards to training, player management and tactics. He found playing difficult however, due to the heat and the all-out attacking nature of his teammates, which led to him being frequently exposed at the back, though he found that the club's masseurs managed to cure a long-standing hamstring scar tissue problem.

Upon returning to the UK, he joined Bobby Gould's First Division Coventry City on a one-year £300 a week contract. He was made captain, and though Coventry enjoyed a good first half to the 1983–84 season, they faltered badly in the second half of the season. They finished just one place and two points above the relegation zone after beating Norwich City on the season's final day. Midway through the campaign, Gould had promised him a new two-year contract, but following the poor end to the season, he instead opted to release Allardyce.

In July 1984, he was signed by Mick Buxton at Second Division Huddersfield Town. The move reunited him with Paul Jones, his former centre-half partner at Bolton. Huddersfield finished in 13th place in the 1984–85 season, and at the end of the campaign accepted an offer of £15,000 from Bolton Wanderers, who offered Allardyce a three-year contract. Bolton were then managed by Charlie Wright, who was the goalkeeper during Allardyce's first spell with the club. However, Wright was dismissed in December 1985, and his successor, Phil Neal, did not get along with Allardyce. Neal played himself at centre-half and relegated Allardyce to the bench, despite Neal being a full-back. Bolton reached the 1986 Associate Members' Cup Final at Wembley Stadium, which ended in a 3–0 defeat to Bristol City, with Allardyce as an unused substitute.

Allardyce was offered the chance to join Tranmere Rovers, but instead joined Preston North End after being persuaded by manager John McGrath, who promised to make Allardyce the backbone of his team. Preston won promotion out of the Fourth Division in second-place in 1986–87 (Allardyce was also named on the PFA Team of the Year), and consolidated their Third Division status with a 16th-place finish in 1987–88. By this time Allardyce began considering his retirement as a player, and applied to management positions at York City and Notts County, and had an unsuccessful interview with Doncaster Rovers.

== Style of play ==
Bolton fans gave him the nickname "Super Sam Bionic Man" due to his tough tackling approach and the way he quickly got up after heavy collisions whilst the opposition player would be left flat on the ground. Veteran manager Dave Bassett, a friend of Allardyce, once humorously remarked that "He was what I called a ball-playing defender... If he wasn't playing with the ball he was playing with your balls." He was uncomfortable in possession. He played simple balls to his nearest teammates when he found himself with the ball, whilst teammates would be reluctant to pass to him. He did however possess good awareness and heading skills, and his anticipation made up for his lack of pace.

== Managerial career ==
=== Early career ===
Allardyce was hired as a player-coach by Brian Talbot at West Bromwich Albion in February 1989. He spent most of the rest of the 1988–89 season at The Hawthorns managing and playing for the reserve team, before being promoted to first team coach in the summer, in a move that saw former first-team coach Stuart Pearson demoted to reserve team coaching. Allardyce and Talbot were dismissed in January 1991 following a defeat to Isthmian League side Woking in the FA Cup. He later worked as a part-time coach at Bury, but manager Mike Walsh could not afford to keep him on the staff for the 1989–90 season.

Allardyce then took up the role of player-manager of Limerick and guided the team to promotion into the League of Ireland Premier Division after winning the 1991–92 League of Ireland First Division. Despite tremendous financial pressures, they achieved promotion, with Allardyce coaching and playing for the first team whilst the club board signed players as Allardyce had no knowledge of the Irish football scene.

After his season in Ireland, Allardyce returned to England for the start of the 1992–93 season to coach at Preston North End under Les Chapman. Ten games into the season, however, Chapman was dismissed and Allardyce was appointed caretaker manager. Despite a promising spell in charge, Allardyce did not get the job permanently, and in December 1992 Preston appointed John Beck as manager. Allardyce worked as youth team coach for 18 months, but later said the extreme long ball tactics Beck enforced upon the club were "indefensible".

=== Blackpool ===
On 19 July 1994 Blackpool, West Lancashire derby rivals to Preston North End, appointed Allardyce as their new manager following the departure of Billy Ayre, agreeing a salary of £18,000 a year. He signed defender Darren Bradshaw, midfielder Micky Mellon and spent a club record £245,000 on Andy Morrison, who Allardyce described as a "horrible in-your-face" centre-back and a "complete nutter". He also changed the club's backroom staff, hiring Bobby Saxton as his assistant, promoting player Phil Brown to a coaching role, and appointing Mark Taylor as physio, who would follow Allardyce to Blackburn and Newcastle. Blackpool finished the 1994–95 season in 12th place after falling out of the promotion race with just one win in their final 11 games.

He spent £200,000 on striker Andy Preece, and also brought in young defender Jason Lydiate and goalkeeper Steve Banks for the 1995–96 campaign. Blackpool finished third, missing out on automatic promotion on the last day of the season, and were beaten in the play-off semi-finals by Bradford City. They had won 2–0 away at Valley Parade, only to lose 3–0 in the return leg at Bloomfield Road. Chairman Owen Oyston, while he was in a prison cell, dismissed Allardyce shortly after the play-off defeat. Allardyce then had a brief spell on the coaching staff under Peter Reid at Sunderland, working as director of the academy.

We had missed promotion to the First Division by a point. Yet it had all been done on next-to-nothing, and during the months leading towards the end of the season, I hardly ever saw Owen Oyston. But he always assured me that, no matter what, my job would be safe. I turned up for that meeting having been told it was to discuss new terms. Instead, I was told that I was being sacked. It was cold, calculated, pre-planned, whatever. I walked out of there with £10,000, no job, and desperately worried that my reputation would be damaged forever.

— Five years after his sacking, Allardyce stated that he still had no idea why Blackpool relieved him of his position.

=== Notts County ===
In January 1997, Allardyce returned to football as manager of struggling Division Two club Notts County. He arrived too late to save them from relegation in 1996–97, and in his autobiography, described how the players "would not respond" to his coaching methods as they went 18 games without a win and pressure mounted on Allardyce. However, he held on to his job and led the club to promotion as champions of Division Three at the end of the 1997–98 season, built upon a three-man defence and a mid-season run of ten consecutive wins. County broke several club and national records, winning the title by a 19-point margin and becoming the first post-war side to win promotion in March.

Despite the success, chairman Derek Pavis refused to spend money on transfers and, as a result, fell out with Allardyce. Allardyce was eventually allowed to spend £50,000 on striker Kevin Rapley, who helped the club to steer clear of relegation at the end of the 1998–99 campaign. In the summer, he signed midfielder Craig Ramage and utility player Clayton Blackmore. Allardyce remained in charge at Meadow Lane until 14 October 1999, when he resigned his post at Notts County to return to Bolton Wanderers.

=== Bolton Wanderers ===
==== Promotion out of Division One ====
Allardyce was appointed manager of Bolton Wanderers following Colin Todd's departure, who had resigned in protest at the sale of Per Frandsen as the club attempted to raise funds for the new Reebok Stadium. He inherited a talented squad, which included Eiður Guðjohnsen, Jussi Jääskeläinen, Mark Fish, Claus Jensen, Dean Holdsworth, Bo Hansen, Michael Johansen, and Ricardo Gardner. He was forced to sell Andy Todd, son of Colin Todd, after he broke assistant manager Phil Brown's jaw in a team-bonding session. Despite being in the bottom half of the table when he took over, Bolton reached the 1999–2000 Division One play-offs, losing to Ipswich Town in the semi-finals, and had an eventful run to the League Cup and FA Cup semi-finals, only missing out on the 2000 FA Cup Final after a penalty shoot-out defeat to Aston Villa. He blamed referee Barry Knight for the play-off defeat, accused him of being biased against Bolton. Allardyce was rewarded for turning the club around with a ten-year contract, though the terms of the contract only entitled him to a one-year's compensation pay if he was dismissed.

In summer 2000, Guðjohnsen and Jensen were sold for £4 million each. Allardyce focused on spending money to improve the club's facilities and backroom staff, believing that money spent in these areas would allow Bolton to compete with clubs who had bigger budgets and paid bigger wages than Bolton could afford. On the playing front he spent £400,000 on striker Michael Ricketts and £1.5 million to bring back Frandsen from Blackburn and also signed utility player Ian Marshall and Bradford City loanee Isaiah Rankin. Teenager Kevin Nolan was also promoted from the youth team, whilst 35-year-old defender Colin Hendry arrived on loan. Bolton reached the play-off final at the Millennium Stadium in 2000–01, where they beat Preston North End 3–0 to achieve promotion to the Premier League after a three-year absence.

==== Premier League survival ====
Building for the 2001–02 Premier League campaign, Allardyce signed France international defender Bruno Ngotty from Marseille in a loan deal which was eventually made into a permanent one after Ngotty established himself as a key first team player. He also brought in Henrik Pedersen from Silkeborg IF for £650,000, though otherwise remained loyal to the players that had won promotion the previous campaign. They recorded a 5–0 win at Leicester City on the opening day, then beat Middlesbrough and Liverpool to secure nine points from their first three games. After six games without a win, Bolton then recorded a shock 2–1 victory over Manchester United on 20 October. However their form dropped, and so in the January transfer window Allardyce brought in Danish midfielder Stig Tøfting, German striker Fredi Bobic (on loan), and World Cup-winning attacker Youri Djorkaeff. Djorkaeff scored both goals in a 2–1 win over Charlton Athletic on 23 March and Bobic scored a hat-trick in a 4–1 win over Ipswich Town on 6 April; the victory over Ipswich proved to be essential as Bolton ended the season in 16th place on 40 points, ahead of Ipswich who were relegated with 36 points.

Allardyce managed to sign another big name on a free transfer for the 2002–03 season, bringing in 28-year-old Nigeria captain Jay-Jay Okocha, who four years previously had been purchased by Paris Saint-Germain for £14 million. He also brought in Spanish central defender Iván Campo on loan from Real Madrid. He sold 2001–02 top-scorer Michael Ricketts to Middlesbrough for £3.5 million, bringing in Pierre-Yves André on loan as his replacement. Bolton struggled all season but managed to avoid relegation with a final-day win over Middlesbrough.

Looking to avoid another relegation battle, Allardyce made some signings in preparation for the 2003–04 season, the most significant of which were Brazilian defender Emerson Thome, Greece international Stelios Giannakopoulos, and target-man striker Kevin Davies. Allardyce's side finished eighth in the league and reached the League Cup final, in what was his first major domestic final appearance as a player or manager. Bolton lost 2–1 to Middlesbrough in the final, though Allardyce blamed referee Mike Riley for not giving a late penalty for an alleged handball by Ugo Ehiogu.

==== Venture in Europe ====
Now an established Premier League club, Bolton signed veteran internationals Gary Speed and Fernando Hierro, aged 35 and 36 respectively. Speed and Hierro went into midfield, while Tunisia international Radhi Jaïdi was played at centre-back after arriving on a free transfer from Espérance; he was played alongside another new arrival, Israel defender Tal Ben Haim, who was recommended by Allardyce's son Craig. He also brought in Senegal striker El Hadji Diouf on a season-long loan from Liverpool, whom he would eventually sign permanently for £3 million. After a good start to the season, Allardyce was offered the Newcastle United job, but turned it down and instead signed a new five-year contract with Bolton as he felt the Bolton squad to be more talented. Bolton went on to finish in sixth place in 2004–05 to win qualification to the UEFA Cup for the first time in the club's history.

Bolton reached the Round of 32 in the UEFA Cup in 2005–06, beating Lokomotiv Plovdiv (Bulgaria) in the First Round and successfully negotiating through the Group stage after beating Zenit Saint Petersburg (Russia), and drawing with Sevilla (Spain), Beşiktaş (Turkey) and Vitória Guimarães (Portugal), before losing to Marseille (France) in the knock-out stages. Allardyce's success with Bolton resulted in the FA putting him on a short-list of four people to succeed Sven-Göran Eriksson as England manager after the 2006 FIFA World Cup, alongside Alan Curbishley, Steve McClaren and Martin O'Neill. He was interviewed for the position and was told by FA Chief Executive Brian Barwick that the final choice would be between him and McClaren however the FA eventually decided to give the job to McClaren. Allardyce was also again offered the Newcastle job and was this time to keen to take it, but Newcastle chairman Freddie Shepard broke off contract negotiations after electing to appoint caretaker-manager Glenn Roeder on a full-time basis. Allardyce's team seemed unaffected by speculation on his future or by their European exploits and ended the season in eighth position.

Keen to strengthen Bolton for a European push in the 2006–07 season, Allardyce signed France international striker Nicolas Anelka from Fenerbahçe for a club record £8 million. He also signed Ivory Coast defender Abdoulaye Méïté from Marseille, and in an unusual sequence of events made a £400,000 profit on Dietmar Hamann, who changed his mind about joining Bolton and signed with Manchester City a day after signing a pre-contract agreement with Bolton; Manchester City agreed to pay Bolton £400,000 in compensation. Bolton had another good season: their 16 points from their first eight games was the last time for 14 years that two teams from outside the so-called 'big six' averaged at least two points per match in their first eight games (the other team being Portsmouth). However, Allardyce's relationship with chairman Phil Gartside became increasingly strained as Gartside refused to sanction greater transfer spending to finance a push for UEFA Champions League qualification. On 29 April 2007, Allardyce resigned with the club in fifth place with two games of the season left to play, and the following day, his assistant Sammy Lee was announced as his replacement.

=== Newcastle United ===
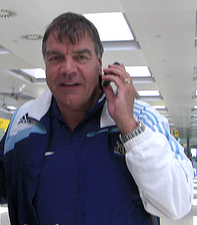
Allardyce in 2007

Allardyce was offered the Manchester City job, but the offer was withdrawn after Thaksin Shinawatra's purchase offer of the club was accepted. On 15 May 2007, Newcastle United announced that Allardyce had signed a three-year contract to succeed Glenn Roeder as manager. Coincidentally Newcastle then also had a change of owners, as Mike Ashley completed his takeover of the club. The sales of Scott Parker and Kieron Dyer raised £13 million, allowing Allardyce to sign Australia international striker Mark Viduka (free transfer), utility man Alan Smith (£6 million), midfielder Geremi Njitap, controversial midfielder Joey Barton (£5.5 million), left-back José Enrique (£6.3 million), right-back Habib Beye (£2 million), and defender Abdoulaye Faye. Newcastle enjoyed a good start to the season, beating Allardyce's former club Bolton 3–1 on the opening day in a run of five wins and two draws from the opening nine league games. However they then had a series of disappointing results in the run-up to Christmas, and after gaining only one point from a possible six from bottom-of-the-table Wigan and Derby Allardyce parted company with Newcastle United on 9 January 2008. He had gone into the meeting with chairman Chris Mort expecting to be told Newcastle had signed a new player only to learn he was being replaced by Kevin Keegan in his second stint as Newcastle manager.

=== Blackburn Rovers ===
On 17 December 2008, Allardyce was appointed as manager of Blackburn Rovers on a three-year contract, succeeding Paul Ince, who left the club in 19th place with just three wins from 17 games. Allardyce's first game in charge was a 3–0 victory over Stoke City at Ewood Park three days later. This was the first game of a nine-game unbeaten run. He strengthened the team by spending £2 million on Sunderland winger El Hadji Diouf and brought in defender Gaël Givet on loan from Marseille. Allardyce finished his first season in charge with a 0–0 draw with West Bromwich Albion and a final league position of 15th.

Blackburn were forced to sell talismanic Paraguay striker Roque Santa Cruz to Manchester City and defender Stephen Warnock to Aston Villa for a combined £21.5 million to balance the books. Allardyce was permitted to bring in defensive midfielder Steven Nzonzi from Amiens for £500,000, Croatia international forward Nikola Kalinić from Hajduk Split for £6 million, and Pascal Chimbonda from Tottenham Hotspur for £2.5 million. In the 2009–10 season, Blackburn reached the League Cup semi-final against Aston Villa, but lost over two legs. Blackburn remained mid-table for the duration of the season, and finished tenth with a final day victory away at Aston Villa.

The club was put up for sale in the summer of 2010, and Allardyce was offered the job of managing Shabab Al-Ahli Dubai but could not secure permission to leave Blackburn without paying compensation to the club and so remained in charge at Ewood Park. Allardyce was later dismissed by new owners the Venky family on 13 December 2010, with Rovers placed 13th in the league. He was replaced by one of his coaches, Steve Kean, whose agent Jerome Anderson was a highly influential figure with the Venky family.

=== West Ham United ===
Allardyce was appointed as manager of then-recently relegated West Ham United on 1 June 2011, signing a two-year contract. He vowed to play "attractive football" in getting West Ham back to the Premier League, according to the "traditions of the club", and rejected the claims that he played dull, long-ball football at previous clubs. He signed Abdoulaye Faye, Kevin Nolan, Joey O'Brien and Matt Taylor. Faye, Nolan and O'Brien had all played under Allardyce at his former club Bolton Wanderers while Taylor was a Bolton player who had joined after Allardyce left the club. He made striker John Carew West Ham's fifth signing of the season, on a free transfer, followed by defender George McCartney from Sunderland on a season-long loan, strikers Sam Baldock from Milton Keynes Dons and midfielder Papa Bouba Diop on a free transfer. He concluded his summer transfer window signings on deadline day by bringing in midfielders David Bentley from Tottenham Hotspur and Henri Lansbury from Arsenal, both on season-long loans, as well as utility man Guy Demel from Hamburg for an undisclosed fee. Nicky Maynard, Ricardo Vaz Tê and Ravel Morrison followed in the 2011 winter transfer window. Over the course of the 2011–12 season a total of 25 players left the club while 19 were signed. In March 2012, despite standing in third place in the Championship, Allardyce's style of football was again questioned. Fans called for more passing of the ball and football played on the pitch and not in the air. On 19 May 2012, West Ham were promoted back to the Premier League after only one season in the Championship after beating Blackpool 2–1 in the play-off final. Allardyce described this promotion as his best-ever achievement.

A busy transfer window for the summer of 2012 saw Allardyce bring in eleven players, including his former Bolton goalkeeper Jussi Jääskeläinen, midfielder Mohamed Diamé, Mali international striker Modibo Maïga, Wales international centre-back James Collins, defensive midfielder Alou Diarra, winger Matt Jarvis, England striker Andy Carroll (on loan from Liverpool) and Israel international midfielder Yossi Benayoun. West Ham finished the 2012–13 season in tenth place, and Allardyce renewed his contract at West Ham by signing a new two-year deal.

Allardyce's main signing of summer 2013 was Andy Carroll, for a £15 million fee from Liverpool, whilst he also spent an undisclosed fee on winger Stewart Downing, again from Liverpool, to provide crosses for Carroll to convert into goals. He also signed goalkeeper Adrián on a free transfer from Real Betis. However, Allardyce's plans were disrupted when Carroll picked up a long-term injury, which left Allardyce regretting the transfer, especially as he had chosen Carroll instead of signing Swansea City's Wilfried Bony, who went on to score 16 league goals in the 2013–14 campaign. Allardyce was awarded the Premier League Manager of the Month for February 2014 following a run of four wins and one draw in their five Premier League games. In April 2014, during an away game against West Bromwich Albion, a section of West Ham fans expressed their distaste at the style of football played under Allardyce by displaying a banner which read "Fat Sam Out, killing WHU". The following month some supporters hung a banner bearing the legend "Fat Sam Out" outside the mansion owned by club chairman, David Sullivan, in Theydon Bois, Essex. Despite protests, on 20 May 2014, the club announced that Allardyce would be staying as manager and would be supported by new attacking coach Teddy Sheringham for the 2014–15 season to "ensure the team provides more entertainment" and to "improve the club's goal tally".

In summer 2014, Allardyce signed midfielder Cheikhou Kouyaté, left-back Aaron Cresswell, attacker Enner Valencia, right-back (on loan from Arsenal) Carl Jenkinson, striker Diafra Sakho, defensive midfielder Alex Song (on loan from Barcelona), midfielder Morgan Amalfitano, and forward Mauro Zárate. In October 2014, pundits like BBC's Robbie Savage were commenting about the team's "more attractive and attacking playing style" or "the statistics [that] show the progress that West Ham have made in the last few months." Allardyce was awarded the Premier League Manager of the Month for October 2014 after three wins for West Ham out of four games played that month. Allardyce left West Ham on 24 May 2015, the final day of the season, after his contract was not renewed. Allardyce stated that "I didn't want to stay. I suppose you could say it was mutual if they didn't want me to stay either". His West Ham side had finished 12th in the 2014–15 season, one place higher than in the 2013–14 season.

=== Sunderland ===
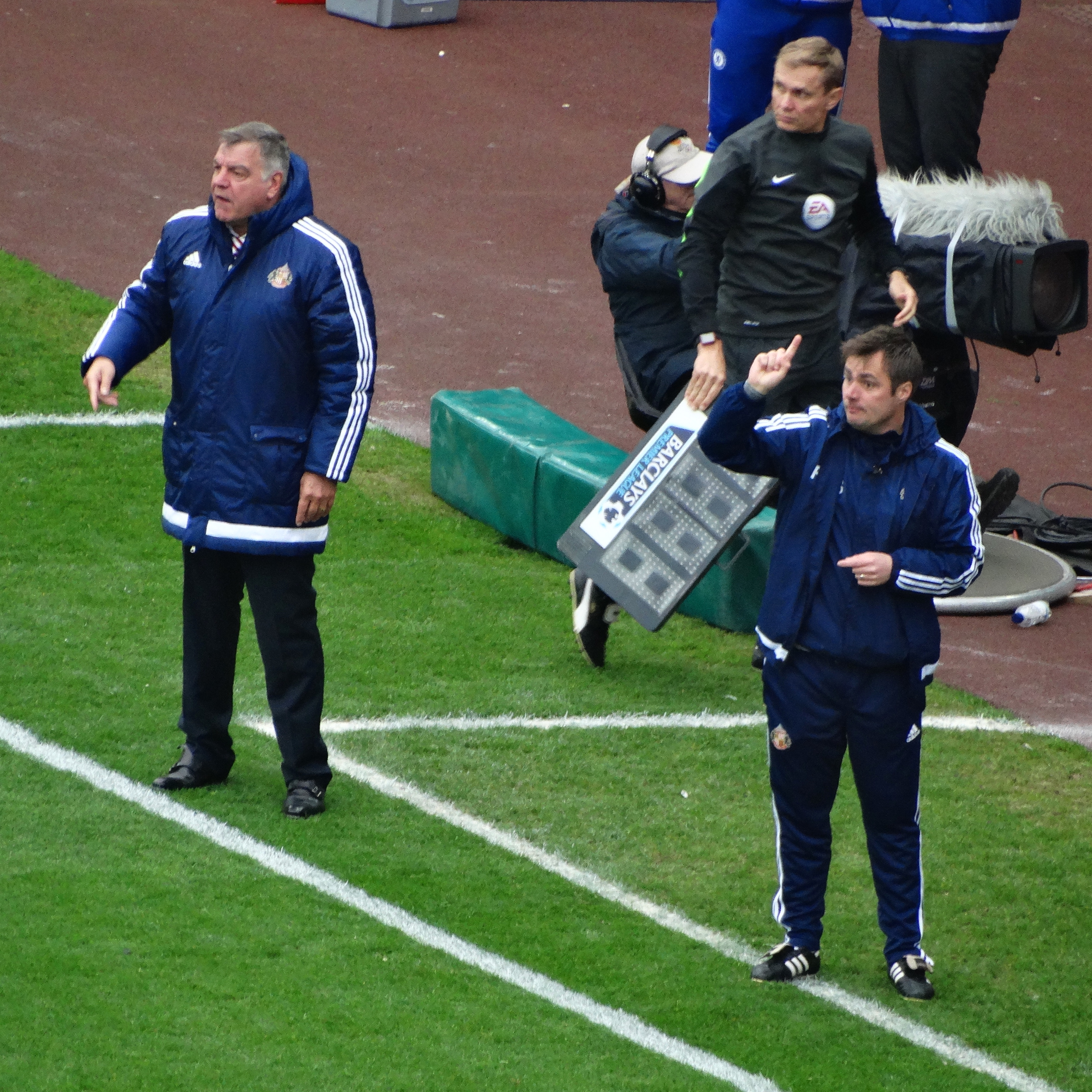
Allardyce (left) as manager of Sunderland in 2016

On 9 October 2015, Allardyce was named the new Sunderland manager, replacing Dick Advocaat. When Allardyce was appointed, Sunderland sat 19th in the Premier League table with three points from their first eight games of the season. Signing a two-year contract, he became the first manager to have managed both Newcastle United and Sunderland. On 25 October, in his second game as manager, he guided Sunderland to a 3–0 win against rivals and his former club Newcastle United. However, after a run of 5 defeats in a row in December, Sunderland headed into the second half of the season in the relegation zone with only 12 points from 19 games.

In the January transfer window he signed centre-backs Lamine Koné and Jan Kirchhoff and attacking midfielder Wahbi Khazri. On 6 February 2016, Sunderland scored two late goals to draw 2–2 with Liverpool at Anfield, having trailed 2–0 with ten minutes remaining. Later that week winger Adam Johnson was dismissed by the club after pleading guilty to one count of sexual activity with a child and one charge of grooming. Sunderland remained in the relegation zone for much of the remainder of the 2015–16 season, before they boosted their survival chances by beating Norwich City 3–0 at Carrow Road on 16 April, closing the gap on 17th-place Norwich to just one point. Allardyce successfully led Sunderland to safety from relegation after beating Everton 3–0 on 11 May, a result which also ensured the relegation of rivals (and one of his former clubs) Newcastle United. Allardyce earned praise for his management of Sunderland from some pundits, particularly for his organized approach and emphasis on a strong defence.

=== England ===
On 22 July 2016, Allardyce signed a two-year contract to become manager of the England national team. He won his first and only game in charge on 4 September, as an Adam Lallana goal deep into injury-time was enough to beat Slovakia on the opening day of qualification for the 2018 FIFA World Cup. Following allegations of malpractice, Allardyce left the role by mutual consent on 27 September, having managed the team for just 67 days and one match.

=== Crystal Palace ===
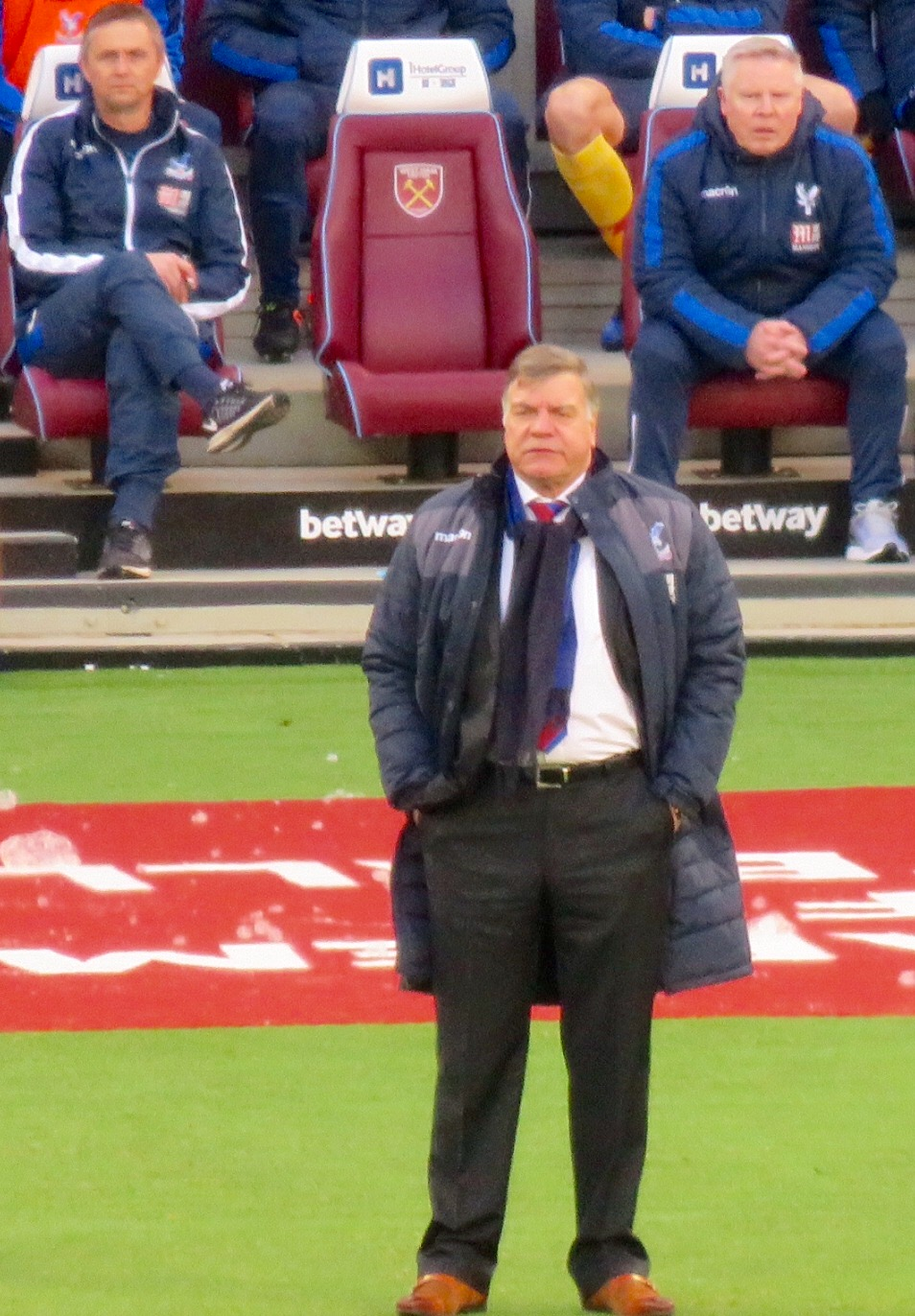
Allardyce (front) as manager of Crystal Palace in 2017

On 23 December 2016, Allardyce signed a two-and-a-half-year contract to become manager of Crystal Palace, a day after the dismissal of Alan Pardew. He strengthened in the January transfer window by spending around £30 million on Jeffrey Schlupp, Patrick van Aanholt, and Luka Milivojević. The "Eagles" confirmed their safety from relegation in the penultimate game of the 2016–17 season with a 4–0 victory over Hull City at Selhurst Park. Allardyce unexpectedly announced his departure from Crystal Palace on 23 May 2017, saying he had no intention of seeking another job, in what was interpreted as a retirement announcement. However, on 19 July 2017, Allardyce clarified that he would be open to an international management position, but not another club job.

=== Everton ===
Despite announcing his retirement from club management, on 30 November 2017, Allardyce was appointed manager of Everton on an 18-month contract. Everton were lying in thirteenth place in the Premier League table upon his arrival, following a poor start to the 2017–18 season under previous manager Ronald Koeman. His first game in charge came two days later, when his side defeated Huddersfield Town in a 2–0 victory. He guided the "Toffees" to a seven-game unbeaten run at the start of his tenure, a spell which included five clean sheets. Having steadied the defence, he stated that his next task was to bring in a consistent goalscorer. Everton ended the season in eighth-position, but fans were dissatisfied with the style of play. Whilst under Allardyce's management, Everton were ranked 20th for total shots, 19th for total shots on target, 16th for passing accuracy and 17th for shots faced in the Premier League. Allardyce left the club on 16 May 2018.

=== West Bromwich Albion ===
On 16 December 2020, Allardyce was appointed manager of West Bromwich Albion on an 18-month contract after Slaven Bilić was dismissed with the club 19th in the Premier League table. His time as manager began with West Brom losing 3–0 at home to local rivals Aston Villa on 20 December with defender Jake Livermore being sent-off in the first half for a bad foul on Jack Grealish. BBC correspondent Simon Stone reported after the match that "Allardyce has his work cut out... the size of this task [avoiding relegation] cannot be overstated". It took until his sixth game in charge for the Baggies to record a victory, when they won 3–2 away at Black Country derby rivals Wolverhampton Wanderers. In the same month, he testified that it would "kill" him if he was relegated with West Brom and that he was aware of the health risks of returning to the managerial position.

In January 2021, Allardyce said that three transfers had fallen through for West Brom as, following Brexit, the players would not have obtained a work permit. In the same month, it was reported that Allardyce could not get the hoped for reinforcements. He had wanted to sign another two players before the transfer window closed. Despite picking up some notable results, such as a memorable 5–2 away victory against eventual 2020–21 UEFA Champions League winners Chelsea, he was unable to keep West Brom in the Premier League, as they were relegated to the Championship on 9 May following a 3–1 away defeat against Arsenal. This marked Allardyce's first relegation from the Premier League in his career. On 19 May, following a 3–1 defeat to West Ham, Allardyce confirmed he would step down as manager at the end of the 2020–21 season, despite the club stating their desire for him to continue as manager next season.

=== Leeds United ===
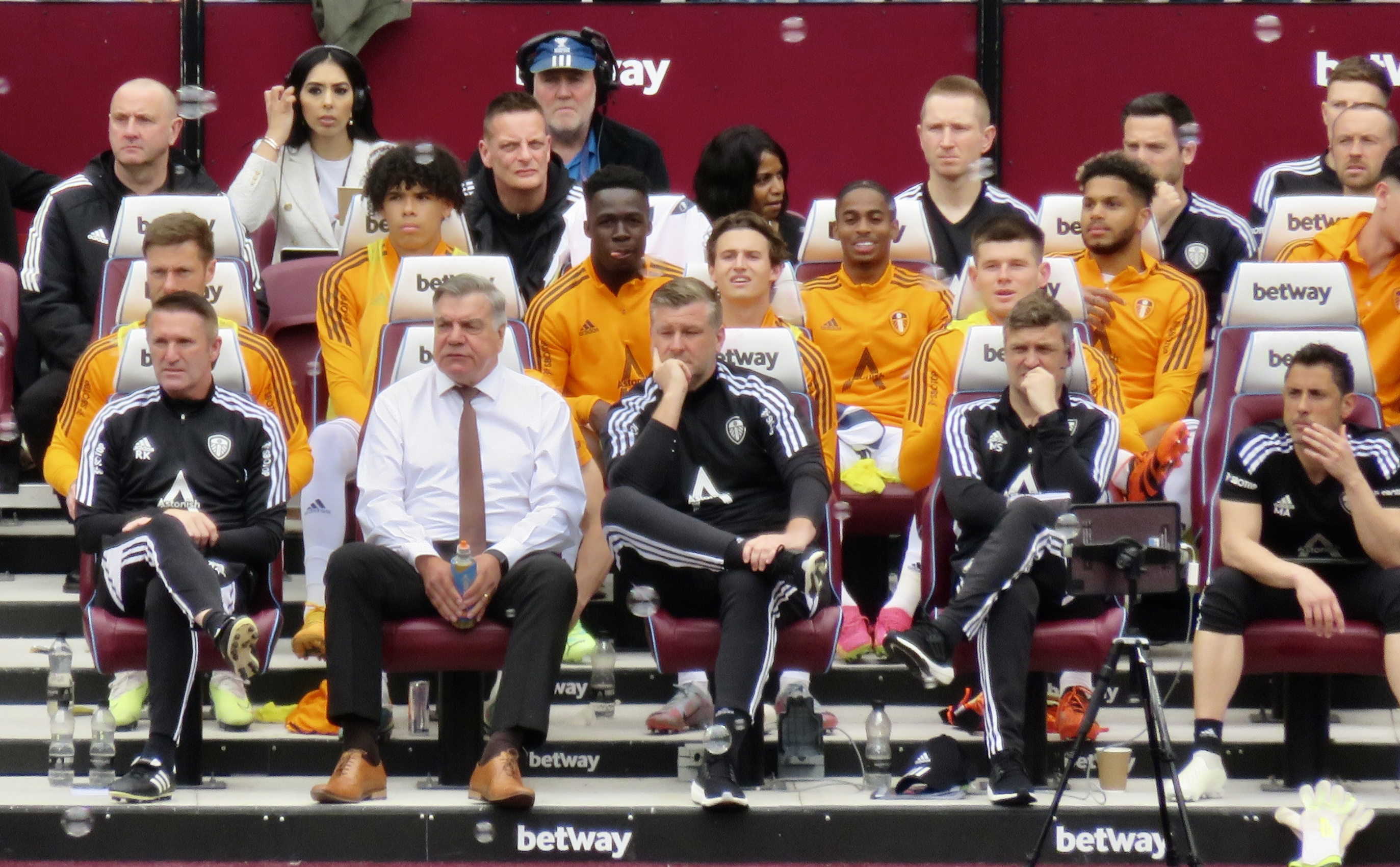
Allardyce as manager of Leeds United

On 3 May 2023, Allardyce was appointed as manager of Premier League club Leeds United following the dismissal of Javi Gracia, with four matches left to play of the 2022–23 season. At the time of his appointment, Leeds were in 17th place, outside of the relegation zone on goal difference. In his first game in charge on 6 May, Leeds lost 2–1 away to Manchester City. Leeds drew their next game, against Newcastle United but lost the last two games of the season, 3–1 away to West Ham and 4–1 at home to Tottenham Hotspur. Leeds finished in 19th place in the Premier League and were relegated to the Championship. On 2 June 2023, following the club's relegation, it was announced by the club that Allardyce had left by mutual agreement. As such, Allardyce became the manager with the shortest tenure for a Premier League manager with just 30 days at Leeds, surpassing Les Reed at Charlton Athletic who previously held the record with a 40-day tenure.

== Managerial style ==
Allardyce is a keen proponent of sports science and using technology and innovative techniques in coaching his teams, such as computerised performance analysis and yoga. Martin Hardy of The Independent described him as "one of the pioneers of sports science in English football". Former players and pundits have cited his preparation as his main strength, which allows his teams to have better organisation and defensive stability. Former Bolton player Kevin Davies also highlighted Allardyce's man-management skills as a strength.

Allardyce has a reputation for using long ball tactics, though he has said that this perception is "totally and utterly wrong". Former Newcastle player Lee Clark defended Allardyce from criticism of his tactics and said that Allardyce was right to work hard on set-plays and on the organisation of his team. His talent for getting the best out of modest squads also gave him a reputation as a "survival specialist" who could steer a struggling Premier League club out of the relegation zone.

Criticism of his perceived long-ball tactics became more intense as he managed West Ham United in the Premier League, including discontent from West Ham's own supporters. In January 2014, following a 0–0 draw at Stamford Bridge, Chelsea manager, José Mourinho criticised West Ham's football, likening it to "football from the 19th century". In October 2014, Allardyce claimed his reputation for playing long ball football was "not founded in fact" and had been used as an excuse by opposing managers such as Arsène Wenger, David O'Leary, Graeme Souness and Rafael Benítez following defeats by sides managed by Allardyce. Allardyce wrote in his autobiography that "when they hit a 50-yard ball it was a cultural pass; when we did it, it was a hopeful hoof". In 2021, Allardyce was described by Pep Guardiola as a "genius" for his ability to save clubs from relegation.

== Personal life ==
He met his wife Lynne Ward while still a youth team player at Bolton Wanderers, and the pair married on 1 June 1974. They have a son, Craig (9 June 1975), and daughter, Rachael (21 April 1979). He was given an honorary doctorate by the University of Bolton in July 2010. In addition to his football career, Allardyce has also run several businesses, including a motor spares firm, a fast-food restaurant, a social club, a pub, a piano bar, and a pub restaurant. He published his autobiography, Big Sam, in October 2015.

In January 2013, Allardyce received "substantial", but undisclosed, damages from former Blackburn Rovers manager Steve Kean. In 2011, Kean had been recorded in a bar in Hong Kong alleging that Allardyce had been dismissed from his post at Blackburn Rovers because he was a "crook".

In May 2019, Allardyce's grandson, also named Sam, signed for Oxford United having previously been a youth team player with Manchester United and Bury.

Allardyce was the manager for the England teams at Soccer Aid in 2012, 2014, 2016, 2018, 2019, and 2020.

On 14 November 2021, Allardyce took part in a charity match to help raise money for the mother of Bolton Wanderers player Gethin Jones, who had been diagnosed with motor neuron disease. The current Bolton first team played against a team of legendary Bolton players, with Allardyce acting as manager of the legends team. The Bolton first team won 7–4.

== Corruption allegations ==
=== 2006 Panorama investigation ===
On 19 September 2006, a BBC Panorama documentary alleged that Allardyce and his son, Craig, had accepted payments from agents in exchange for signing certain players. Allardyce denied the allegations, and no formal charges were brought against him. Two agents, Teni Yerima and Peter Harrison, were secretly filmed, each separately claiming that they had paid Allardyce through his son. Allardyce denied ever taking or asking for a bribe. Others implicated of wrongdoing were Harry Redknapp, Kevin Bond, and Frank Arnesen. As a result of the allegation, Allardyce refused to speak to the BBC. While he also stated he was going to sue the broadcaster to clear his name, Allardyce failed to issue libel proceedings as he was advised that suing for damage to reputation was a costly and time-consuming process. The final report of the Stevens inquiry published in June 2007 expressed concerns regarding the involvement of Craig Allardyce in some transactions, stating that: "The inquiry remains concerned at the conflict of interest that it believes existed between Craig Allardyce, his father Sam Allardyce—the then manager at Bolton—and the club itself." Allardyce stated that the inquiry was a public relations exercise and that the conclusion of a "conflict of interest" was "innuendo, without any facts".

=== 2014 Ravel Morrison situation ===
In February 2014, Daniel Taylor, chief football writer for The Guardian and The Observer, wrote that West Ham player and England prospect Ravel Morrison felt he had come "under considerable pressure" from Allardyce to sign up with football agent Mark Curtis, who represented Allardyce and a number of other West Ham players, including Kevin Nolan, James Tomkins, Jack Collison, Matt Jarvis, Andy Carroll, and Jussi Jääskeläinen. Curtis had been charged and eventually cleared by the Football Association during the 2008 investigation into Luton Town's illegal transfer dealings. Curtis responded to the allegations by saying they were "nonsense", while Allardyce talked of Morrison complaining about "a groin injury" while the club's medical staff could find "no problem", Morrison was eventually loaned to Championship side Queens Park Rangers for the remainder of the 2013–14 season. and made a reference to the player's "disciplinary issues in the past".

=== 2016 Daily Telegraph investigation ===
In September 2016, Daily Telegraph reporters posing as businessmen filmed Allardyce, who had recently been appointed the manager of the England football team, allegedly offering to advise on how to get around FA rules on player third party ownership and negotiating a £400,000 deal, subject to FA approval. Following the publication of the recordings, Allardyce left his role as England manager by mutual agreement with the FA, stating that he had made 'an error of judgment'. Robert Sullivan, Director of Strategy at the FA, later confirmed to the Commons Culture, Media and Sport Select Committee that Allardyce's comments were "a factual, correct statement around the laws of the English game and having third-party ownership".

Following a review by City of London Police, Allardyce was cleared of any wrongdoing, with The Daily Telegraph also clarifying that it "did not suggest that Allardyce had broken the law", though he agreed that he had been "a fool". Speaking to The Observer, Martin Glen, CEO of the FA, said that "it is a tragedy that we have ended up having to part company with him [Allardyce] over the, the – you know – entrapment".

== Career statistics ==
=== Club ===
Appearances and goals by club, season and competition
Club	Season	League			National cup (Note: Includes FA Cup, U.S. Open Cup, FAI Cup)		Other^{[A]}		Total	
Club	Season	Division	Apps	Goals	Apps	Goals	Apps	Goals	Apps	Goals
Bolton Wanderers	1973–74	Second Division	7	0	1	0	1	0	9	0
Bolton Wanderers	1974–75	Second Division	18	3	0	0	0	0	18	3
Bolton Wanderers	1975–76	Second Division	40	5	6	1	1	0	47	6
Bolton Wanderers	1976–77	Second Division	41	6	0	0	13	0	54	6
Bolton Wanderers	1977–78	Second Division	41	4	4	0	6	1	51	5
Bolton Wanderers	1978–79	First Division	20	1	0	0	5	0	25	1
Bolton Wanderers	1979–80	First Division	17	2	4	1	2	2	23	5
Bolton Wanderers	Total		184	21	15	2	28	3	227	26
Sunderland	1980–81	First Division	25	2	0	0	2	0	27	2
Millwall	1981–82	Third Division	36	1	4	2	1	0	41	3
Millwall	1982–83	Third Division	27	1	1	0	8	0	36	1
Millwall	Total		63	2	5	2	9	0	77	4
Tampa Bay Rowdies	1983	North American Soccer League	11	1	0	0	0	0	11	1
Coventry City	1983–84	First Division	28	1	1	0	3	0	32	1
Huddersfield Town	1984–85	Second Division	37	0	3	0	2	0	42	0
Bolton Wanderers	1985–86	Third Division	14	0	0	0	3	0	17	0
Preston North End	1986–87	Fourth Division	37	2	5	0	7	1	49	3
Preston North End	1987–88	Third Division	39	0	2	0	5	1	46	1
Preston North End	1988–89	Third Division	14	0	2	0	5	0	21	0
Preston North End	Total		90	2	9	0	17	2	116	4
West Bromwich Albion	1989–90	Second Division	1	0	0	0	0	0	1	0
West Bromwich Albion	1990–91	Second Division	0	0	0	0	0	0	0	0
West Bromwich Albion	Total		1	0	0	0	0	0	1	0
Limerick	1991–92	League of Ireland First Division	23	3	0	0	0	0	23	3
Preston North End	1992–93	Second Division	3	0	2	0	0	0	5	0
Career total			479	32	35	5	64	5	578	42

A. The "Other" column constitutes appearances and goals in the League Cup, Football League Trophy, and Full Members Cup.

=== Managerial statistics ===
As of match played 28 May 2023

Managerial record by team and tenure
Team	From	To	Record					Ref.
Team	From	To	P	W	D	L	Win %	Ref.
Limerick (player-manager)	1991	1992	27	14	10	3	51.9	
Preston North End (caretaker)	30 September 1992	30 November 1992	12	3	4	5	25.0	
Blackpool	19 July 1994	29 May 1996	102	44	23	35	43.1	
Notts County	16 January 1997	14 October 1999	145	56	39	50	38.6	
Bolton Wanderers	19 October 1999	29 April 2007	371	153	104	114	41.2	
Newcastle United	15 May 2007	9 January 2008	24	8	6	10	33.3	
Blackburn Rovers	17 December 2008	13 December 2010	90	32	24	34	35.6	
West Ham United	1 June 2011	24 May 2015	181	68	46	67	37.6	
Sunderland	9 October 2015	22 July 2016	31	9	9	13	29.0	
England	22 July 2016	27 September 2016	1	1	0	0	100.0	
Crystal Palace	23 December 2016	23 May 2017	24	9	3	12	37.5	
Everton	30 November 2017	16 May 2018	26	10	7	9	38.5	
West Bromwich Albion	16 December 2020	30 June 2021	26	4	8	14	15.4	
Leeds United	3 May 2023	2 June 2023	4	0	1	3	0.0	
Total			1,064	411	284	369	38.6	—

== Honours ==
=== Player ===
Bolton Wanderers

- Football League Second Division: 1977–78

Millwall

- Football League Group Cup: 1982–83

Preston North End

- Football League Fourth Division promotion: 1986–87

Individual

- PFA Team of the Year: 1986–87 Fourth Division

=== Manager ===
Limerick

- League of Ireland First Division: 1991–92

Notts County

- Football League Third Division: 1997–98

Bolton Wanderers

- Football League First Division play-offs: 2001
- Football League Cup runner-up: 2003–04

West Ham United

- Football League Championship play-offs: 2012

Individual

- Football League First Division Manager of the Month: January 2001
- Premier League Manager of the Month: August 2001, November 2003, January 2004, December 2006, February 2014, October 2014

== See also ==
- List of football managers with the most matches
