= Phil Gartside =

English businessman (1952–2016)

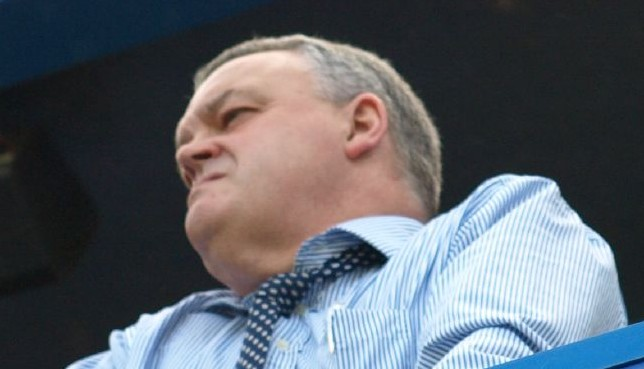
- Gartside pictured in May 2008
- Born: Philip Andrew Gartside; 27 April 1952; Leigh, England
- Died: 10 February 2016 (aged 63); Cheshire, England
- Occupations: Chairman of Bolton Wanderers; FA (Board Member)
- Years active: 1999–2015

Philip Andrew Gartside (27 April 1952 – 10 February 2016) was an English businessman who was chairman of Bolton Wanderers Football Club.

== Career ==
Philip Andrew Gartside was born in Leigh, England on Sunday, 27 April 1952. He joined the board of Bolton in April 1989, having been a fan of the club since his days as a pupil at Leigh Grammar School. He admitted he screamed for the sacking of manager Bill Ridding when on the terraces at Burnden Park in the late 1960s

He became chairman of Bolton Wanderers in October 1999 at the same time that Sam Allardyce was appointed as manager. While Gartside was chairman the club gained promotion to the Premier League and reached the UEFA Cup for the first time in their history. However, he was unable to hold on to Sam Allardyce in May 2007, who left the club to go to Newcastle United.

Bolton were relegated to the Championship in May 2012.

He oversaw a number of high profile arrivals to the playing staff at the club including Nicolas Anelka, Youri Djorkaeff, Jay-Jay Okocha, Fernando Hierro and Iván Campo. He was a prominent football administrator, a Football Association Board Member, and an executive director of the new Wembley Stadium.

Gartside proposed a plan to his fellow chairmen of the Premier League on 23 April 2009 about splitting the Premier League into two divisions of eighteen teams in each, and allowing clubs in the Scottish Premier League, such as Celtic and Rangers to join. UEFA have said they would not veto the proposed move.

== Health ==
At the beginning of December 2015, it was reported that he was gravely ill and his family requested privacy.

Phil Gartside died of a brain tumour on 10 February 2016 at his home near Northwich, Cheshire at the age of 63. A memorial service was held for him on 16 March.
