= Craig Allardyce =

English footballer and manager

Personal information
- Full name: Craig Samuel Allardyce
- Date of birth: 9 June 1975 (age 51)
- Place of birth: Bolton, England
- Height: 6 ft 3 in (1.91 m)
- Position: Defender

Senior career*
Years	Team	Apps	(Gls)
1993–1994	Preston North End	1	(0)
1994	Macclesfield Town	2	(0)
1994	Guangdong Hongyuan	5	(0)
1994	Northwich Victoria		
1994–1997	Blackpool	1	(0)
1997	Rushden & Diamonds	1	(0)
1997–1998	Chorley		
1998	Chesterfield	1	(0)
1998	Peterborough United	4	(0)
1998	Welling United	3	(0)
1998–2000	Mansfield Town	10	(0)
2000	Boston United	3	(1)
Total		31+	(1+)

Managerial career
- 2007–2009: Turton
- * Club domestic league appearances and goals

Craig Samuel Allardyce (born 9 June 1975) is a retired footballer and a football agent. He is the son of former player and manager, Sam Allardyce. He was the manager of non-League club Turton from 2007 to 2009.

== Footballing career ==
=== Playing career ===
Allardyce had a journeyman career, playing for eleven clubs in seven years.

Allardyce started his career in 1993 with Preston North End and left the club in 1994, to join Macclesfield Town.

In 1994, Allardyce moved to Chinese outfit Guangdong Hongyuan. On 31 July 1994, Allardyce was involved in an on-pitch brawl with Hao Haidong in Guangdong Hongyuan's league match with Bayi FC. This resulted in Allardyce and Hao receiving a half-year ban by the Chinese Football Association. He left China after this incident.

Allardyce then returned to England to play for a short spell at Northwich Victoria, before moving to Blackpool, where his father Sam was manager until he was sacked in 1996. He stayed at the club for three years, playing only once in a league game during the 1995–96 season.

After he was released by Blackpool in 1997, Allardyce then had short spells at Rushden & Diamonds, Chorley, Chesterfield, Peterborough United, Welling United and Mansfield Town, before joining Boston United to end his career in 2000.

=== Career as a football agent ===
After his retirement at 25, Allardyce became a football agent.

=== Corruption allegations ===
On 19 September 2006, Allardyce, and his father Sam were implicated in a BBC Panorama documentary for allegedly taking "bungs" (bribes) from agents if they signed certain players. Two agents, Teni Yerima and Peter Harrison, were secretly filmed, each separately saying that they had paid Sam Allardyce through his son. Sam Allardyce denied ever taking or asking for a bribe.

The final report of the Stevens inquiry, published in June 2007, expressed concerns regarding the involvement of father and son Allardyce in a number of transactions, however found no evidence of criminal wrongdoing, stating: ″The inquiry remains concerned at the conflict of interest that it believes existed between Craig Allardyce, his father Sam Allardyce – the then manager at Bolton – and the club itself.″ In Summary, the Stevens Report stated: "there is no evidence of any irregular payments to club officials or players, and they are identified only as a consequence of the outstanding issues the inquiry has with the agents involved."

=== Managerial career ===
In December 2007 Allardyce took on a joint-managerial role of the West Lancashire Football League club Turton. He left in 2009.
