= Jussi Jääskeläinen =

Finnish footballer and coach (born 1975)

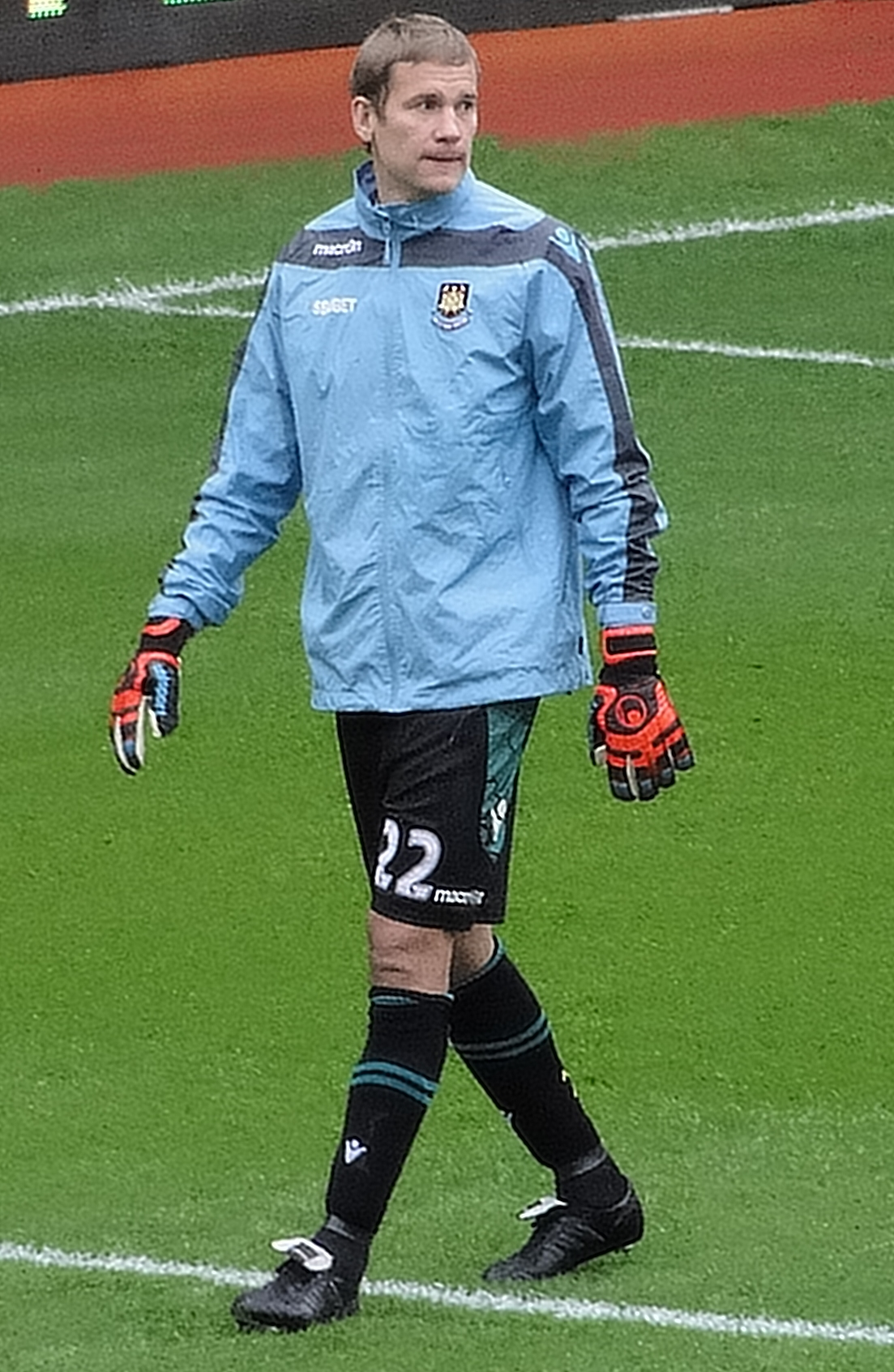
- Jääskeläinen training with West Ham United in 2012

Personal information
- Full name: Jussi Albert Jääskeläinen
- Date of birth: 19 April 1975 (age 51)
- Place of birth: Mikkeli, Finland
- Height: 1.91 m (6 ft 3 in)
- Position: Goalkeeper

Team information
- Current team: PK-35 (goalkeeping coach)

Youth career
- MP

Senior career*
Years	Team	Apps	(Gls)
1992–1995	MP	64	(0)
1995–1997	VPS	54	(0)
1997–2012	Bolton Wanderers	474	(0)
2012–2015	West Ham United	57	(0)
2015–2017	Wigan Athletic	44	(0)
2017–2018	ATK	1	(0)
Total		694	(0)

International career
1998–2010	Finland	56	(0)

Managerial career
- 2018: Wrexham (joint caretaker)
- * Club domestic league appearances and goals

Jussi Albert Jääskeläinen (pronounced [ˈjusːi ˈjæːskelæi̯nen]; born 19 April 1975) is a Finnish professional football coach and a former footballer who played as a goalkeeper. He is currently working as a goalkeeping coach of Ykkösliiga club PK-35.

During his career, Jääskeläinen most notably represented Bolton Wanderers from 1997 until 2012, making 530 appearances across all competitions. During his time at the club, Jääskeläinen was one of their key players, as Bolton transformed from a second-tier side into one of the Premier League’s top clubs under Sam Allardyce. He left Bolton for West Ham United at the end of the 2011–12 season, moving on after three seasons to Wigan Athletic on a free transfer. In his first season with Wigan, he won the League One title. He left Wigan after two seasons to join Indian club ATK, where he retired in 2018.

Jääskeläinen earned 56 caps for the Finland national team, making his debut in 1998 and retiring from international football in 2010.

== Club career ==
=== MP Mikkeli ===
Jääskeläinen was born in Mikkeli, and started his football career at Veikkausliiga side MP Mikkeli. He got his big break in the first team following the injury of Esa Viitanen. Jääskeläinen made his debut for the club, starting the whole game and kept a clean sheet, in a 1–0 win against HJK Helsinki on 17 May 1992. He made five more appearances for MP Mikkeli, as the club avoided relegation in the Veikkausliiga. In the opening game of the 1993 season, Jääskeläinen kept another clean sheet, in a 1–0 win against Ilves. He later made more appearances later in the 1993 season, including another clean sheet, in a 5–0 win against Kuusysi on 12 August 1993.

At the start of the 1994 season, Jääskeläinen became a first choice goalkeeper for MP Mikkeli. However, the club went on a seven match run without a win in the league. This last until on 12 June 1994 when he helped Mikkeli win 2–1 against TPV, to end the club’s winless streak. Jääskeläinen pulled off another win against HJK Helenski on 7 August 1994 when he helped Mikkeli win 5–1. Jääskeläinen helped the club avoid relegation for the second by collecting five points in the last three remaining matches. At the end of the 1994 season, he went on to make twenty–six appearances in all competitions.

In the 1995 season, Jääskeläinen kept three consecutive clean sheets in the league between 21 June 1995 and 6 July 1995. The club, once again, found themselves in a relegation zone but he helped Mikkeli avoid relegation for the third time. At the end of the 1995 season, Jääskeläinen went on to make twenty–six appearances in all competitions.

=== VPS Vaasa ===
Shortly after helping Mikkeli avoid relegation, it was announced on 26 October 1995 that Jääskeläinen joined VPS Vaasa. The move reported to have cost 110,000 mk.

He made his debut for the club in the opening game of the 1996 season, starting as a first choice goalkeeper, in a 2–1 loss against Turun Palloseura. Jääskeläinen then kept three consecutive clean sheets in the league between 9 June 1996 and 16 June 1996. He, once again, kept three consecutive clean sheets in the relegation play–offs in the first three matches; and the wins have kept VPS Vaasa safe from relegation. At the end of the 1996 season, Jääskeläinen made twenty–seven appearances in all competitions.

In the 1997 season, Jääskeläinen started the season on a good note when he helped VPS Vaasa go on the first seven league matches unbeaten. During that run, Jääskeläinen kept three consecutive clean sheets in the league between 18 May 1997 and 25 May 1997. He, once again, kept three consecutive clean sheets in the league between 24 August 1997 and 10 September 1997. Throughout the 1997 season, VPS Vaasa found themselves, competing with HJK Helsinki over the league title, but eventually, HJK Helsinki won the league and VPS Vaasa had to settle for second place. At the end of the 1997 season, Jääskeläinen made twenty–seven appearances in all competitions. For his performance, he finished third for the league’s Player of the Year.

=== Bolton Wanderers ===
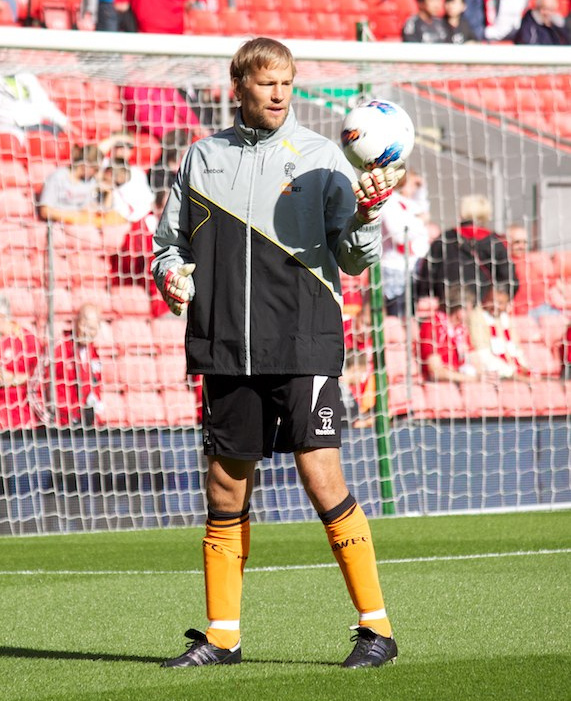
Jääskeläinen warming up ahead of Bolton Wanderers’ match against Liverpool on 27 August 2011.

Jääskeläinen was bought by manager Colin Todd for £100,000 for Bolton Wanderers of the Football League First Division in 1997. Originally, he went on a trial with Norwich City before being persuaded to join Bolton Wanderers by Todd. Upon joining the club, manager Todd said: "He's one for the future. I saw him playing for the Under 21s and he was very impressive. I followed it up immediately but things got held up. When I got wind of him being on trial and possibly signing for another English club I moved in quickly. You can't let people of his quality pass you by." However, Jääskeläinen was the third choice goalkeeper for the rest of the 1997–98 season, behind Keith Branagan and Gavin Ward, as Bolton Wanderers were relegated to Football League First Division.

Following the injury of Branagan and the departure of Ward, Jääskeläinen was promoted to the club’s first choice goalkeeper ahead of the 1998–99 season. He made his Bolton Wanderers debut, starting the whole game, in a 2–2 draw against Crystal Palace in the opening game of the season. Jääskeläinen soon established himself as the club's first choice keeper, managing to beat off Branagan, who returned from injury. He suffered a broken nose during the match against Huddersfield Town, but managed to play on, as the club won 3–0 and also receiving a clean sheet in the process. Jääskeläinen’s twelve matches winning streak as a Bolton Wanderers’ starter ended on 7 November 1998 when the club loss 2–0 against Queen Park Rangers. Despite briefly losing a place to Branagan in late–October, he continued to regain his place as Bolton Wanderers’ first choice goalkeeper. Jääskeläinen then helped the club kept three consecutive clean sheets in the league on two separate occasions during the 1998–99 season, which the first one was between 21 November 1998 and 28 November 1998, and the second one was between 26 December 1998 and 10 January 1999. Due to "playing a small a part to play", this led manager Todd to give him a nickname "The Forgotten Man". However, by March, Jääskeläinen soon came under criticism when he conceded 16 goals in the last six games. As a result, Jääskeläinen was dropped in favour of Steve Banks, as well as, his own injury concern and didn’t play for the rest of the 1998–99 season. At the end of the 1998–99 season, he went on to make forty appearances in all competitions.

Since the start of the 1999–00 season, Jääskeläinen was competing with Banks and Branagan over Bolton Wanderers’ first choice goalkeeper role in the pre–season friendly, with Branagan eventually taking the role, leaving him to play for the club’s reserve matches instead. Following the Branagan’s injury, he made his first appearance of the season against Huddersfield Town on 16 October 1999 and kept a clean sheet, in a 1–0 win. Afterwards, Jääskeläinen regained his first choice goalkeeper role; local newspaper, The Bolton News, stated that: "On the form he is showing at the moment, it's hard to see Jaaskelainen being ousted by either Keith Branagan or Steve Banks, when they are fit again." His performance earned praise from skipper Neil Cox, stating at one match in a 2–1 defeat against Norwich City: "He went into the game under pressure with one or two people having digs at him but one of his saves was world class. And, if he hadn't made the saves he did, we might have gone in 2-0 down at half time." Although Jääskeläinen was dropped in favour of Banks in January, he managed to regain his first choice goalkeeper role for the rest of the 1999–00 season. Jääskeläinen reflected on his enjoyment the highest point of his Bolton Wanderers career so far, saying: "I've still got a lot to learn. I have learned a lot in the two years I have been here but I feel I can get much better. You learn from every game and you continue to gain in confidence the more you play."’’ By March, Jääskeläinen kept four clean sheets, as he was determined to help the club improve by keeping their league season alive to qualify for the play-offs. In doing so, Jääskeläinen turned down a call up from Finland to focus on Bolton Wanderers. However, the club was unsuccessful in the play-off final after losing 7–5 on aggregate against eventual winners, Ipswich Town. At the end of the 1999–00 season, he went on to make forty–one appearances in all competitions. For his performance, Jääskeläinen won Bolton Wanderers’ Junior Whites Player of the Year award.

In the 2000–01 season, Jääskeläinen continued to regain his first team place despite suffering a knee injury in the club’s pre–season. He then also signed a three–year contract extension with Bolton Wanderers. Jääskeläinen helped the club keep five clean sheets in the first two months to the season. He kept three consecutive clean sheets in the league between 16 December 2000 and 26 December 2000. His performances made his among favourite of Bolton Wanderers supporters. Despite signing a contract with Bolton Wanderers earlier in the season, Jääskeläinen was linked with a move away from the club in January. However during a 2–0 win against Tranmere Rovers on 13 January 2001, he suffered a cruciate ligament injury and was a substituted in the 53rd minute. Shortly after, it was announced that Jääskeläinen would be ruled out for the rest of the 2000–01 season. He previously missed one match due to international commitment last October at one point during the season. While out with an injury, Jääskeläinen successfully predicted Bolton's 2000–01 promotion season when he said to team-mates: "I'll see you in the Premiership." At the end of the 2000–01 season, Jääskeläinen made twenty–seven appearances in all competitions.

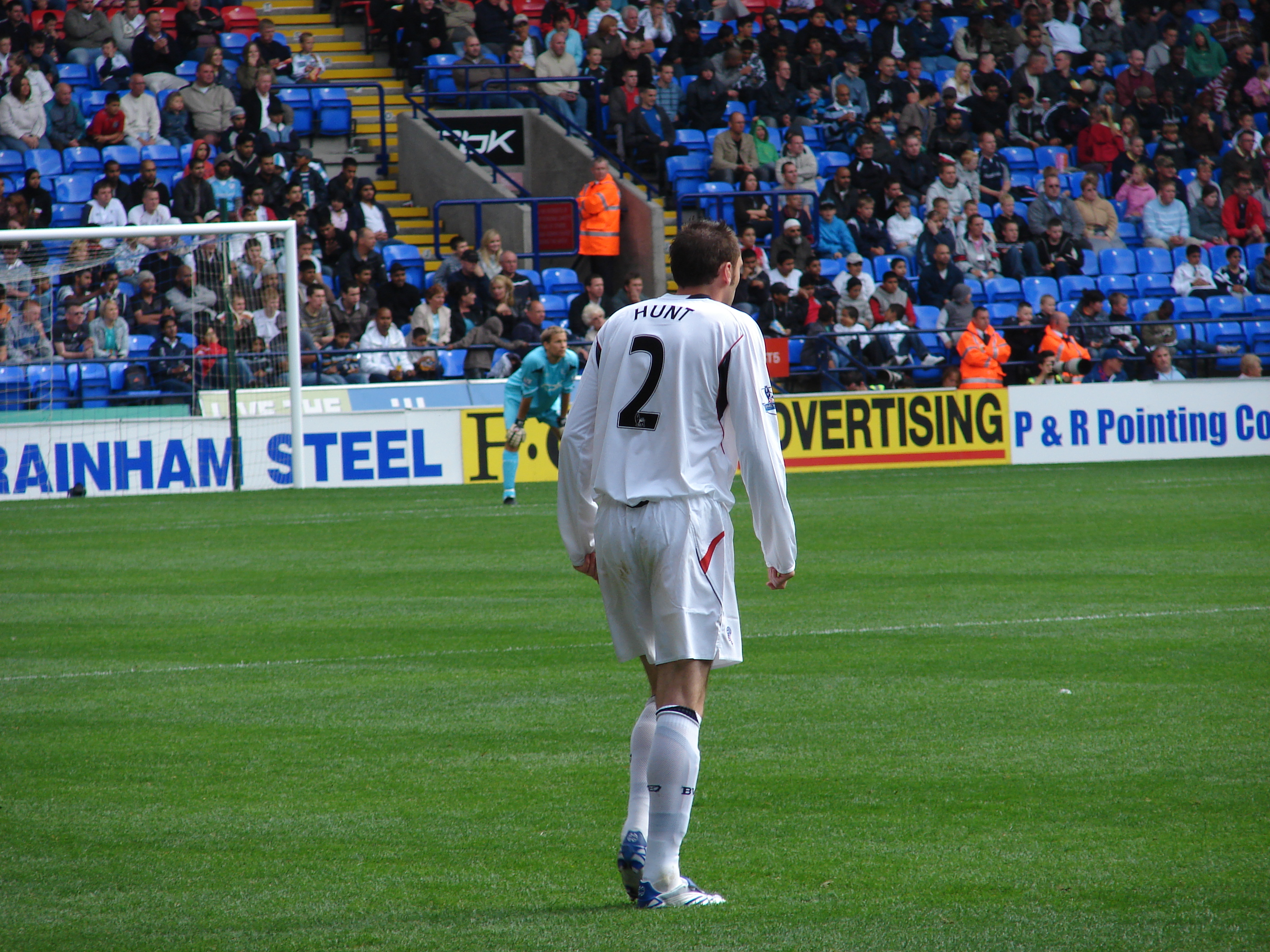
Jääskeläinen in goal, as Nicky Hunt was preparing to defend.

Ahead of the 2001–02 season, questions arose whether Jääskeläinen would be fit at the start of the club’s first Premiership season and stated that his aim was to become the first choice goalkeeper upon returning from injury. On 24 July 2001, he signed a contract extension with Bolton Wanderers, keeping him until 2005. Jääskeläinen made his first appearance since returning from injury, starting and played 80 minutes, in a 1–0 win against Halifax Town on 1 August 2001. He made his Premiership debut, starting the whole game and keeping a clean sheet, in a 5–0 win at Leicester City on the opening day. Jääskeläinen then help Bolton Wanderers beat Middlesbrough and Liverpool to secure nine points from their first three games. During the match against Liverpool, he "made inspirational saves at key moments", including one from Emile Heskey, which was described as "a match winning save." For his performance, Jääskeläinen was awarded the goalkeeper of the month for August by Shoot magazine. However in a match against Newcastle United on 13 October 2001, he received a red card in the 61st minutes for "handling the ball outside the area", as the club went on to lose 4–0. After the match, Jääskeläinen said on his personal website that the referee was right to send him off. But he was included in the starting line–up against Manchester United on 20 October 2001, as Bolton Wanderers won 2–1. On 9 May 2012, in the Premier League 20 Seasons Awards, a double-save from Jääskeläinen against Manchester United on 20 October 2001 came third in a poll deciding the best save in the Premier League's 20-year existence. After the match, he served a one match ban, followed up by a wrist injury that saw him out for weeks. But on 18 November 2001, Jääskeläinen returned to the starting line–up against Ipswich Town and helped the club win 2–1. He helped Bolton Wanderers reach the quarter–finals of the League Cup against Southampton after saving a penalty from Chris Marsden in a penalty shoot–out. His performance led to transfer speculation, linking him with a move to Manchester United, a move Allardyce dismissed and Jääskeläinen, himself, was happy to stay at the club. His performance throughout January earned him the BEN Website Player of the Month for January. In a fourth round of the FA Cup 4–0 defeat against Tottenham Hotspur, local newspaper The Bolton News said Jääskeläinen was the only positive performer throughout the match in Bolton Wanderers’ heavy defeat of the season. On 27 February 2002, he signed a further contract extension with the club, keeping him until 2007. However in a match against Derby County on 16 March 2002, Jääskeläinen received a straight red card for bringing down Lee Morris in the penalty box, as Bolton Wanderers loss 3–1. After serving a two match ban, he returned to the starting line–up in a 4–1 win over Ipswich Town on 6 April 2002; the victory over Ipswich proved to be essential as the club ended the season in 16th place on 40 points, ahead of Ipswich who were relegated with 36 points. After the match, Jääskeläinen said beating Ipswich Town was a "sweet revenge" after defeating the Trotters two seasons ago. Throughout the 2001–02 season, he re-established himself as the club’s first choice goalkeeper, competing once again with Banks and made thirty–eight appearances in all competitions. Jääskeläinen also praised manager Sam Allardyce for his role on "balancing between established players and new faces" on his personal website, while Allardyce later praised him as "top level goalkeeper", describing his form as "putting him in the top Premiership goalkeeper bracket." He was also hailed as the best goalkeeper in the F.A. Premier League by sponsors Barclaycard.

Ahead of the 2002–03 season, Jääskeläinen said that he must avoid getting cards in order to "earn himself the distinction of being a Premiership ever-present this season" and continued to be Bolton Wanderers’ first choice goalkeeper. Despite the club lost the first two league matches of the 2002–03 season, Jääskeläinen managed to make a comeback by keeping two consecutive clean sheets in the league, including another win against Manchester United on 11 September 2002. This led manager Allardyce praising him, describing him as "the big man was outstanding with his commanding performance", who "is responsible most for giving the back four confidence." Bolton Wanderers’ legend Eddie Hopkinson praised his performance, calling him as the club’s best ever keeper. Jääskeläinen said getting a clean sheet would ensure Bolton Wanderers avoid relegation. Despite Bolton Wanderers’ struggles in the Premiership all season, he continued to remain a standout for the side. By March towards the end of the 2002–03 season, Jääskeläinen successfully kept six clean sheets and helped the club go on winning streak in effort to avoid relegation. Their effort to avoid relegation was successfully confirmed on a final day when Bolton Wanderers beat Middlesbrough. Having successfully fulfil his aim to become an ever present goalkeeper in the 2002–03 season, he made thirty–eight appearances in all competitions.

Ahead of the 2003–04 season, Jääskeläinen dismissed links with a move to Manchester City following the retirement of Peter Schmeichel. After just earning one point in the first three league matches, he then kept three consecutive clean sheets in the next three league matches. In a match against Aston Villa on 5 October 2003, Jääskeläinen played a pivotal role when he saved a penalty kick from Juan Pablo Ángel in a 1–1 draw. Throughout November, Jääskeläinen kept four consecutive sheets in the league against Tottenham Hotspur, Southampton, Leeds United and Everton. He played in both legs of the semi–finals of the Football League Cup against Aston Villa, as Bolton Wanderers won 5–4 on aggregate to reach the final. In the Football League Cup final against Middlesbrough, Jääskeläinen started in the goal and conceded two goals in the first ten minutes before the club pulled one goal back but was unable to overcome deficit, resulting in a 2–1 win for the opposition team to win the Football League Cup. After the penalty, he felt that Bolton Wanderers should have got a penalty towards the end of the game, calling it "a clear handball". Jääskeläinen made his 200th league appearances for the club against Tottenham Hotspur on 19 April 2004 and kept a clean sheet, in a 2–0 win. For the second time in the 2003–04 season, Jääskeläinen was an ever present goalkeeper, making forty–one appearances in all competitions. For his performance, he won the Lion of Vienna Award.

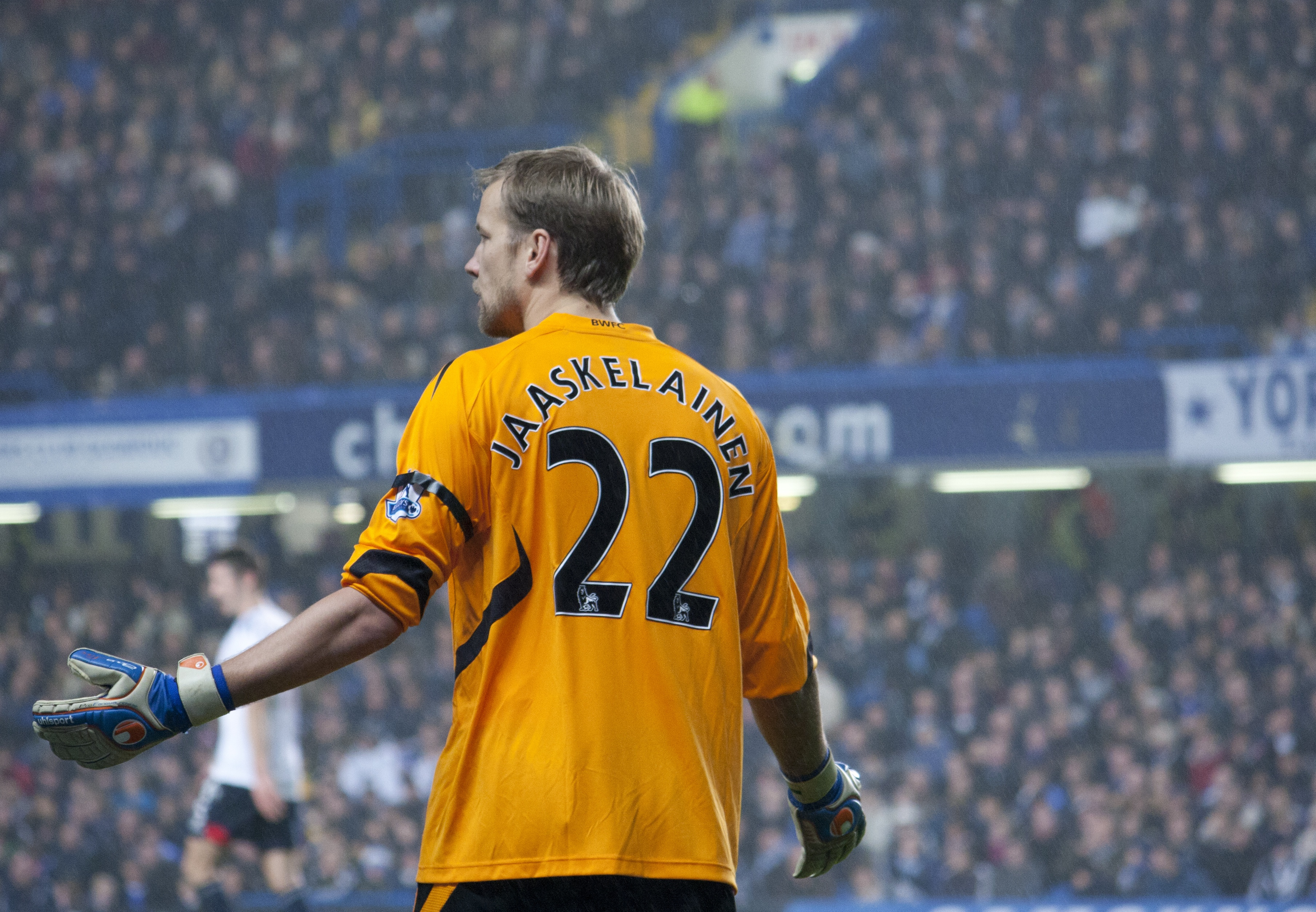
Jääskeläinen playing against Chelsea on 29 December 2010.

Ahead of the 2004–05 season, Jääskeläinen said he's determined to remain as Bolton Wanderers’ first choice goalkeeper following the new signing of Donovan Ricketts, which was successful and Ricketts left the club soon after, and Kevin Poole. In a match against Fulham on 26 August 2004, Jääskeläinen "produced a hat-trick of saves in the second half" before "helplessly" conceded two goals, as Bolton Wanderers loss 2–0. After the match, manager Allardyce said: "There were so many players played badly that I could have changed the whole 11 and they wouldn't have much to complain about -- apart from Jussi," while the club's captain Kevin Nolan sympathised with him, saying: "he had a great game and made some fantastic saves." Jääskeläinen was able to improve the next two matches by a back to back wins against Southampton and Liverpool. His performance continued to spark interests from Manchester United once again, prompting Jääskeläinen, himself, to dismiss the move, stating he’s happy at Bolton Wanderers for the second time. Amid to the future at the club, however, Jääskeläinen received a straight red card in the 87th minute for a professional foul on Jimmy Floyd Hasselbaink, as the club drew 1–1 against Middlesbrough on 7 November 2004. After the match, Bolton Wanderers unsuccessfully appealed for his red card to be overturned, ending his 93 match Premiership starting run. He returned to the starting line–up following his one match ban against Chelsea on 20 November 2004 and helped the club draw 1–1. After being dropped for one match, Jääskeläinen returned to the starting line–up and then kept three consecutive clean sheets, both in the league and FA Cup between 15 January 2005 and 31 January 2005. He, once again, kept another three consecutive clean sheets, both in the league and FA Cup between 5 February 2005 and 19 February 2005. Halfway through the 2004–05 season, Jääskeläinen spoke out Bolton Wanderers’ improved performance, while manager Allardyce praised his performance once more, saying: "He is one of the top, top goalkeepers in the Premiership, not only for his ability but for his consistency. His overall game has got better and better as the years have gone on. His maturity has got better, his decision making and his consistency level now make him one of the top goalies in the world, as far as I am concerned." He helped the club finish sixth place in 2004–05 to earn a place in the UEFA Cup spot for the first time in their history. At the end of the 2004–05 season, he went on to make forty appearances in all competitions. Jääskeläinen described the 2004–05 season as "the first year I've felt really strong all the way through." Following this, he signed a three-year contract extension with Bolton Wanderers, keeping him until 2008.

At the start of the 2005–06 season, Jääskeläinen said about the club’s slow start: "Bolton Wanderers just have to start keeping clean sheets and taking our chances". He played in the club’s first ever European match in first leg of the UEFA Cup first round against Lokomotiv Plovdiv and helped Bolton Wanderers win 2–1. In the return leg, the club won 4–2 on aggregate to qualify for the UEFA Cup group stage. Jääskeläinen kept three consecutive clean sheets in the league between 11 September 2005 and 24 September 2005. However, he came under criticism from the English media after conceding five goals, in a 5–1 loss against Chelsea on 15 October 2005. Jääskeläinen was able to regain his form by keeping another four consecutive clean sheets in the next four matches both in the league and the UEFA Cup, which saw him kept seven clean sheets in the first seventeen matches in all competitions by November. His performance at Bolton Wanderers to led him to say: "I'm only doing my job" when he was praised by manager Allardyce. However, it was later emerged that Jääskeläinen did not a sign a contract with the club last–June, due to his "objection to a particular clause in the contract", leading to a contract breakdown between the two parties. Amid to his future at Bolton Wanderers, he kept three consecutive clean sheets, both in the league and the FA Cup. By February, Jääskeläinen re–opened talks with the club over a new contract. In his 300th appearance for Bolton Wanderers match against Newcastle United on 4 March 2006, he was at fault for the first two goals, in a 3–1 loss, ending the club’s seven league unbeaten. After the match, Jääskeläinen was defended by teammate, Gary Speed. Following two months of contract negotiations, Jääskeläinen signed a contract extension with the club, keeping him until 2008. At the end of the 2005–06 season, he made forty–eight appearances in all competitions.

Ahead of the 2006–07 season, Jääskeläinen said the club can make an improvement for the new season and hope to qualify for Europe again. From 9 September 2006 to 30 September 2006, he kept four consecutive clean sheets in the league. For his performance, both Jääskeläinen and Speed were named Actim Premiership team of the month for September. On 22 October 2006, he saved two penalties in one match from Blackburn Rovers' Benni McCarthy and Jason Roberts to secure a 1–0 away win. After the match, local newspaper The Bolton News wrote positively about his performance, saying: "Faultless in everything he did in the first 87 minutes, he surpassed himself with two penalty saves in as many minutes to secure a famous victory. Whatever else Jussi Jääskeläinen achieves in his time with Bolton Wanderers, he will forever be remembered as the goalkeeper who saved two penalties in a famous derby triumph over Blackburn Rovers." While manager Allardyce praised his performance and compared him to Peter Schmeichel. From 9 December 2006 to 23 December 2006, Jääskeläinen kept four consecutive clean sheets in the league. On 1 January 2007, he made his 300th appearance for the club, in a 3–0 loss against Liverpool. In a match against Charlton Athletic on 30 January 2007, Jääskeläinen conceded an equalising free kick from Talal El Karkouri, as Bolton Wanderers drew 1–1; which he acknowledged his mistake after the match. Having set a target for the club to qualify for the UEFA Champions League, Bolton Wanderers had spent much of the season, challenging for a Champions League and had peak as high as third, but poor results and the sacking of Allardyce saw the club drop out of the top four. On 13 May 2007, Jääskeläinen received Bolton's "Player of the Year Award" and also the "Players' Player of the Year Award" after helping the club secure a UEFA Cup spot for only the second time in their history. At the end of the 2006–07 season, he made forty appearances in all competitions. Following this, Jääskeläinen revealed that Bolton Wanderers opened talks with him over a new contract over his future at the club, with one more year left.

Ahead of the 2007–08 season, Jääskeläinen, however, turned down a contract from Bolton Wanderers, putting his future at the club in doubt. But it was revealed that he would stay at Bolton Wanderers. The start of the proved to be tough for Jääskeläinen, as Bolton Wanderers struggled to win only one league game from eleven matches. Following 1–1 draw against Tottenham Hotspur on 23 September 2007, he was involved in a bust up with teammate Abdoulaye Méïté. After the match, manager Sammy Lee said about the incident: "If anybody had any doubts as to the lads' commitment, then that said it all in a nutshell. Sometimes you want a bit more of that, be it on the field or on the training ground. It shows they are committed and care passionately." Jääskeläinen played in both legs of the UEFA Cup first round against FK Rabotnički, as the club won 2–1 on aggregate to advance to the group stage. After the sacking of manager Sammy Lee, results began to improve under the new management of Gary Megson. In a match against Manchester United on 24 November 2007, Jääskeläinen produced a good save from Owen Hargreaves’ free kick and kept a clean sheet, in a 1–0 win. After a brief recovery from a wrist injury, he set up a last minute goal for Stelios Giannakopoulos to score a header, in a 1–0 win against Derby County on 2 January 2008. Jääskeläinen then kept three consecutive clean sheets in the league between 19 January 2008 and 2 February 2008. He played in both legs of the Round of 32 UEFA Cup against Atlético Madrid and helped Bolton Wanderers win 1–0 on aggregate to advance to the next round. In a match against Liverpool on 1 March 2008, however, Jääskeläinen was at fault when he scored an own goal, in a 3–1 loss. His hopes of redemption was short–lived when Jääskeläinen suffered a back injury and was out for the rest of the 2007–08 season. But as he was recuperating from his back injury, Jääskeläinen appeared as an unused substitute on the last game of the season, in a 1–1 draw against Chelsea. At the end of the 2007–08 season, he made thirty–five appearances in all competitions. Throughout the 2007–08 season, there was a much speculation linking him with a move away from Bolton when his contract expired following the season conclusion. Jääskeläinen agreed a new four-year contract on 11 June, which he signed on 9 July.

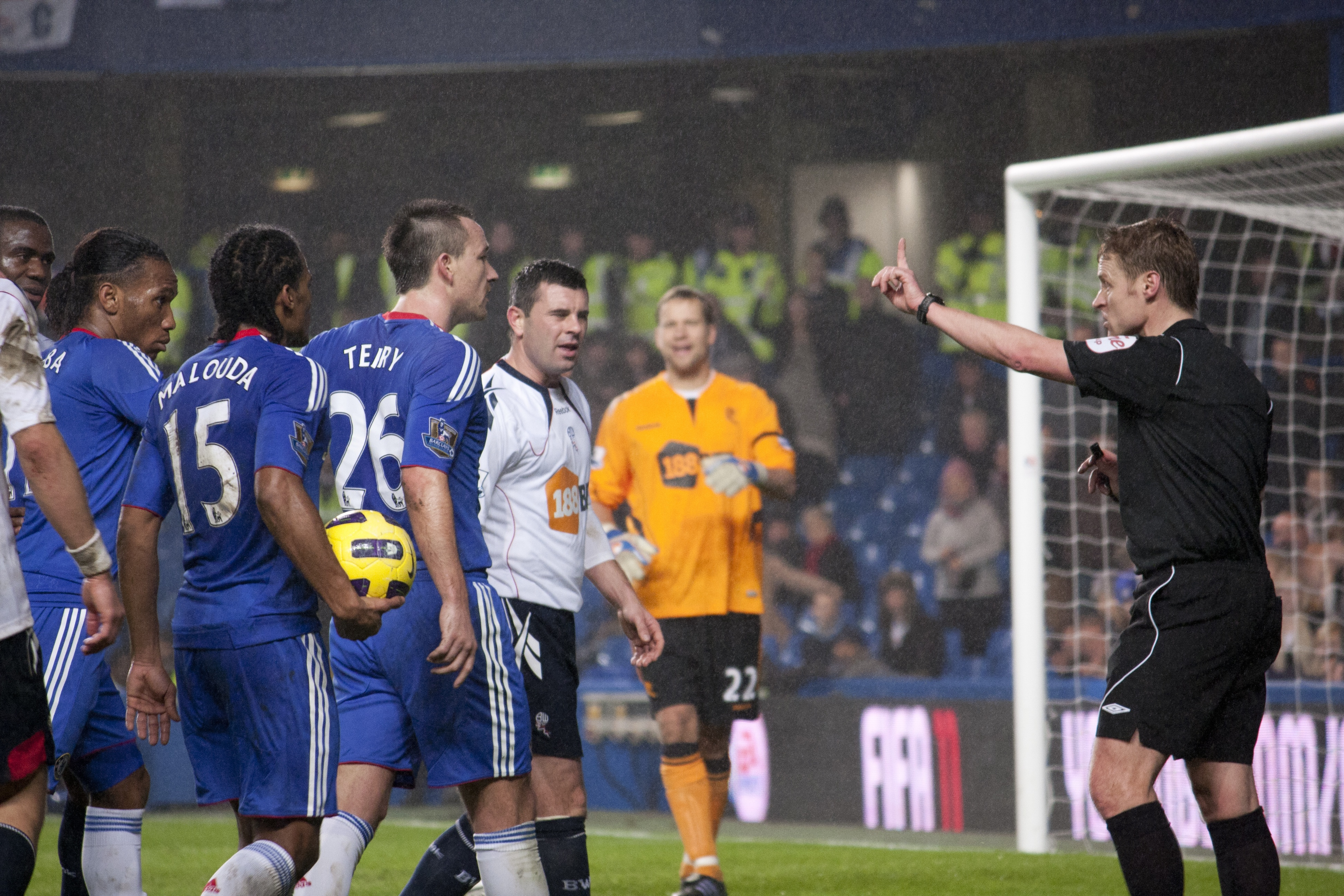
Jääskeläinen (second right) looked on, as players from Chelsea and Bolton Wanderers confronted referee Mike Jones.

Ahead of the 2008–09 season, Jääskeläinen made a recovery from his back injury and made his first appearance, playing in the second half, in a 0–0 draw against Rochdale in a pre–season friendly match. He said that his target was to help Bolton Wanderers rediscover their winning ways. Jääskeläinen then provided an assist for Kevin Davies to score a header, in a 2–1 loss against Fulham on 13 September 2008. His 400th appearance came against Manchester City on 2 November 2008, with his 400th start coming six days later against Hull City, both of the matches were wins and earned himself a clean sheet. After the match, manager Megson said about Jääskeläinen’s performance: "That’s as good a performance as you will ever see – he was unbelievable. There’s some good goalkeepers throughout the world but we wouldn’t swap him for anyone. In 400 games I doubt he’s had one above that standard. He looks after himself, on the field and off the field, so he can go on for as long as he wants to as long as injuries permit." On 28 January 2009, Jääskeläinen saved another penalty from Benni McCarthy in a match against Blackburn Rovers, now managed by his former manager Sam Allardyce, to secure a 2–2 draw. However, the club faced a threat of relegations following an inconsistent results. In a match against Portsmouth on 18 April 2009, Jääskeläinen produced a number of good saves before conceding a goal, as Bolton Wanderers loss 1–0, putting the club’s Premier League under threat. But Bolton Wanderers’ Premier League status was secured when the club drew 1–1 against Hull City on 16 May 2009, thanks to Jääskeläinen’s performances. At the end of the 2008–09 season, he made forty appearances in all competitions. Despite the inconsistent season, Jääskeläinen was named Player of the Year by readers of The Bolton News.

After twelve years at Bolton Wanderers, Jääskeläinen was granted a testimonial match against Hibernian in August 2009, a match attended by 13,000 fans, in which he kept a clean sheet. Jääskeläinen said his target was to "earn about 12 or 13 in a season, though he expressed optimistic ahead of the new season. At the start of the 2009–10 season, however, Bolton Wanderers did not get off to the best of starts, losing all three matches in the first month to the season despite his good performances. As months goes by, results began to improve slowly, though poor results eventually saw manager Megson sacked and replaced by Owen Coyle. But Jääskeläinen’s performance was a few unscathed from the club’s inconsistent form and criticism despite conceding 36 times by the time Megson left. He then made his 400th Premier League appearance for Bolton Wanderers, in a 3–3 draw against Manchester City on 12 December 2009. After the appointment of Coyle, he played down suggestions over reports that Jääskeläinen confronted the newly appointed goalkeeping coach Phil Hughes. Under the management, he earned four clean sheets by February and helped the club climb out of the bottom three. In fifth round of the FA Cup against Tottenham Hotspur, Jääskeläinen saved a penalty from Tom Huddlestone, in a 1–1 draw to earn a replay. Eventually, Bolton Wanderers went on to keep their Premier League status by finishing 14th with 39 points. At the end of the 2009–10 season, he went on to make forty–three appearances in all competitions. Reflecting on the season, Jääskeläinen said that Megson’s negative relationship with the club’s supporters had the effect on the season’s performance.

Ahead of the 2010–11 season, Jääskeläinen said his target for the new season was to pass 500 appearances for Bolton Wanderers and earn more clean sheets. He performed a good display for the club, earning four points in the first two league matches. After the match, Coyle and pundits praised Jääskeläinen’s performances, even as going so far as calling him "one of the best keepers in the business". However in a match against Birmingham City in a follow–up match, he received a straight red card in the 36th minute for slapping Roger Johnson in the face, in a 2–2 draw. After serving a three match ban, Jääskeläinen returned to the starting line–up, in a 2–2 draw against Manchester United on 26 September 2010. Following his return, he then contributed to Bolton Wanderers’ good performance that saw the club in the top ten with twenty–nine points in the first half of the 2010–11 season. However, Jääskeläinen’s performance came under criticism when he conceded a total of nine goals in the league throughout January, including an own goal against Stoke City, followed by conceding four goals in a defeat against Chelsea. Responding to criticism on his performance, Jääskeläinen said he’s not affected with Bolton Wanderers’ poor form. In a match against Aston Villa on 5 March 2011, Jääskeläinen played a significant role when he saved a 14-yard strike from Darren Bent and saved a penalty from Ashley Young, in a 3–2 win. His 500th appearance came against Birmingham City on 12 March 2011 in an FA Cup Quarter-Final to help the club win 3–2 to reach the semi–finals and his 500th start a week later at Manchester United, losing 1–0. In a semi–finals of the FA Cup match against Stoke City on 17 April 2011, Jääskeläinen conceded five goals, as Bolton Wanderers loss 5–0 and prevented his dreams of playing in the final once again. In a follow–up match against Arsenal, he was able to make amends for his mistakes and helped the club win 2–1. After being dropped to the substitute bench in favour of Ádám Bogdán, this raised question from the local newspaper The Bolton News on whether would Jääskeläinen become Bolton Wanderers’ first choice goalkeeper ahead of the new season. But he was able to return to the starting line–up for the remaining three matches of the 2010–11 season, losing all of the remaining matches. At the end of the 2010–11 season, Jääskeläinen made thirty eight–appearances in all competitions.

Ahead of the 2011–12 season, manager Coyle revealed that Bolton Wanderers opened talks with Jääskeläinen over a new contract. However, he reportedly rejected a new contract by the club, but manager Coyle maintain his confidence to stay at Bolton Wanderers. In the opening game of the season, Jääskeläinen started the whole game and earned himself a clean sheet when he helped the club win 4–0 against Queens Park Rangers. In a follow–up match against Manchester City, Jääskeläinen was at fault when he made a howler that led to David Silva scoring, in a 3–2 loss. After the match, manager Coyle defended his performance. However, he conceded a total of thirteen goals in the next five matches, facing further criticism. After missing one match with a thigh injury, Jääskeläinen made his return to the starting line–up against Wigan Athletic on 15 October 2011 and helped Bolton Wanderers win 3–1 to end their seven match losing streak. However, the club’s results continued to be poor once again and found themselves, which he expressed confidently of the relegation survival. However in early–January, Jääskeläinen suffered a thigh injury and missed three matches. Even after returning from injury, he was placed on the substitute bench in favour of Bogdán for the rest of the 2011–12 season and finished the season, making eighteen appearances in all competitions.

At the end of the 2011–12 season, Bolton were relegated from the Premier League and Jääskeläinen rejected a two-year contract bringing an end to his 15-year stay with the club. Earlier in the 2011–12 season, he previously turned down a new contract, which was initially denied by manager Coyle. Jääskeläinen made 530 appearances in all competitions, putting him joint third in Bolton's all-time appearance list. Local newspaper The Bolton News paid tribute to Jaaskelainen, saying: "there is no doubt his professionalism ensured he stood as one of, if not the, most consistent goalkeeper in the Premier League for a whole decade."

In March 2005, Jääskeläinen was ranked 10th as the greatest Bolton Wanderers player of all time. In June 2006, he was named as the clubs’s greatest starting eleven in the "modern era". This also led the Bolton News reporter to write an article on whether he was greatest Bolton Wanderers goalkeeper of all time. Jääskeläinen described not winning a silverware for Bolton Wanderers as a "disappointment". Despite this, he later stated that "Bolton Wanderers means everything to his football career and everything in his life".

=== West Ham United ===
On 13 June 2012, West Ham confirmed that Jääskeläinen had agreed personal terms on a one-year deal with an option for a second year. Jääskeläinen was once again reunited with former manager Sam Allardyce, under whom he worked for eight years at Bolton Wanderers. Upon joining the club, he was given a number twenty–two shirt, the same number he wore throughout his time at Bolton Wanderers.

Jääskeläinen made his debut for West Ham United on 18 August 2012 in a 1–0 win against Aston Villa. He kept two more clean sheet, making three clean sheets in their opening four Premier League matches. Manager Allardyce praised Jääskeläinen’s performance for regaining his confidence since he become West Ham United’s first choice goalkeeper. Jääskeläinen then contributed an impressive saves from Fernando Torres and Juan Mata to help the club win 3–1 against Chelsea on 1 December 2012. Shortly after, he was awarded November’s SBOBET Player of the Month. Jääskeläinen, once again, was awarded February’s SBOBET Player of the Month despite West Ham United’s inconsistent form and mixed results. On 12 April 2013, the option for contract extension was activated, keeping Jääskeläinen with "the Hammers" until summer 2014. He played all 38 games of West Ham's 2012–13 season, in the Premier League and was named runner-up in the Hammer of the Year.

Jääskeläinen started the 2013–14 season off to a good start when he kept another three clean sheets in their opening four Premier League matches. Jääskeläinen played a contributing role for West Ham United when he kept a clean sheet in a "vital win" against Tottenham Hotspur to climb out of the relegation zone on 6 October 2013. Jääskeläinen played 18 games in the 2013–14 Premier League season before being dropped in January for Adrián. On 4 June 2014, signed a new one-year contract extension with West Ham keeping him at the club until the end of the 2014–15 season, saying "Physically I feel good and I felt good last season so I hope I can carry on from there." Jääskeläinen played just one game for West Ham in the 2014–15 season, coming on for Carlton Cole after Adrián had been sent-off in a goalless draw at Southampton on 11 February 2015. He was released at the end of the campaign.

=== Wigan Athletic ===
After his release from West Ham, Jääskeläinen trialled with Bradford City. On 11 August 2015, he signed a one-year deal with Wigan Athletic, newly relegated to League One.

Initially back-up to fellow incomer Richard O'Donnell, Jääskeläinen made his debut on 3 October at the age of 40, keeping a clean sheet in a goalless draw with Walsall at the DW Stadium. He kept three consecutive clean sheets in the league between 31 October 2015 and 21 November 2015 that saw the club rise up to fourth place. Jääskeläinen, once again, kept another kept three consecutive clean sheets in the league between 28 January 2016 and 13 February 2016. On 31 March 2016, after his 15 clean sheets in 32 games helped Wigan Athletic onto an 18-match unbeaten run and second place in the table, he extended his contract with the club for another season. Wigan Athletic ended the season as champions after beating Blackpool on 30 April 2016. At the end of the 2015–16 season, Jääskeläinen made thirty–eight appearances in all competitions.

However at the start of the 2016–17 season, he became Wigan Athletic’s second choice goalkeeper following the new signing of Ádám Bogdán, who once again dispatched his first choice goalkeeper role. This continues to last until on 19 November 2016 when Bogdán suffered a cruciate knee ligament damage against Barnsley and was replaced by Jääskeläinen, who played the remaining matches, in a 0–0 draw. He started eight more matches for the club, which saw them earned four points. However by January, Jääskeläinen, once again, lost his first choice goalkeeper role to Matt Gilks and never played for Wigan Athletic again. Following the end of his contract at the end of the 2016–17 season, with the club being relegated back to League One after finishing 23rd, he was one of four players to be released by Wigan. Shortly after, there was a report in Finland suggest that he retired from professional football. However, Jaaskelainen responded to the report, saying that he hasn’t retired from playing yet.

=== ATK ===
On 1 September 2017, 42-year old Jääskeläinen switched clubs and countries, signing for Indian Super League club ATK. He made his debut three months later in a goalless draw at Jamshedpur FC. On 17 January 2018, Jääskeläinen was released after having played as a second choice to Debjit Majumder. Later reports clarified he will remain at the club as a coach, but his playing career had ended.

== International career ==
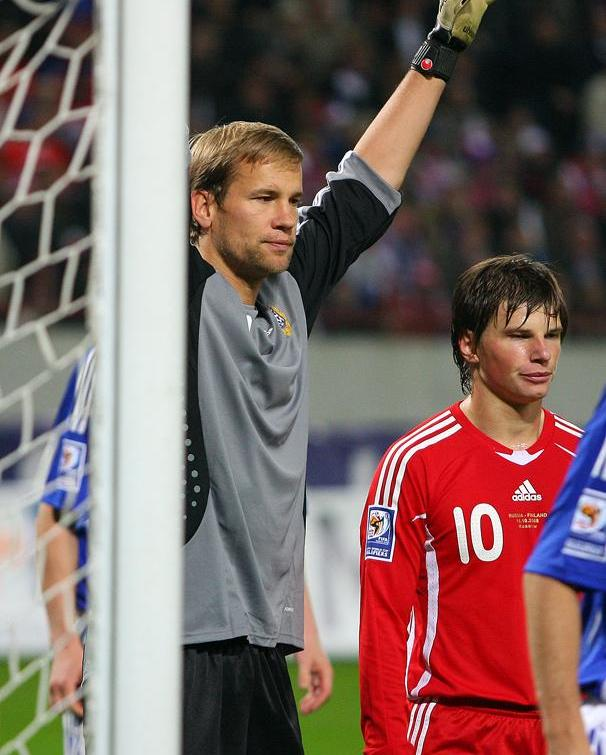
Jääskeläinen next to Andrey Arshavin in goal against Russia in 2008.

Having previously represented Finland levels, Jääskeläinen made his debut for Finland on 25 March 1998 against Malta, having been called up to the national team for the first time. Having not played for Finland for over a year, he picked up his sixth international cap against Norway on 16 August 2000, winning 3–1. Jääskeläinen had to wait until on 20 March 2002 when he earned his eighth international cap, in a 2–0 loss against South Korea. Jääskeläinen was Finland's second choice behind Antti Niemi for years, as he spoke out on becoming the national side’s first choice one day.

But after Niemi retired from international football in 2005, Jääskeläinen finally became the Finnish number one. However, he started four out of the six qualifying campaign matches for the national side, as Finland finished fourth place. In a match against Belarus on 1 March 2006, which it went to penalty shootout following a 2–2 draw, Jääskeläinen saved a penalty from Uladzimir Karytska, which led Finland winning 5–4. In the first match of the UEFA Euro 2008 qualifying match against Poland, he set up a goal for Jari Litmanen, who later scored twice, in a 3–1 win. Jääskeläinen then kept three consecutive clean sheets in the qualifier matches between 7 October 2006 and 15 November 2006. He, once again, kept three consecutive clean sheets in the qualifier matches between 8 September 2007 and 13 October 2007. However, Finland failed to qualify for the UEFA Euro after a goalless draw against Portugal on 21 November 2007. By the end of the year, he won Finnish Footballer of the Year.

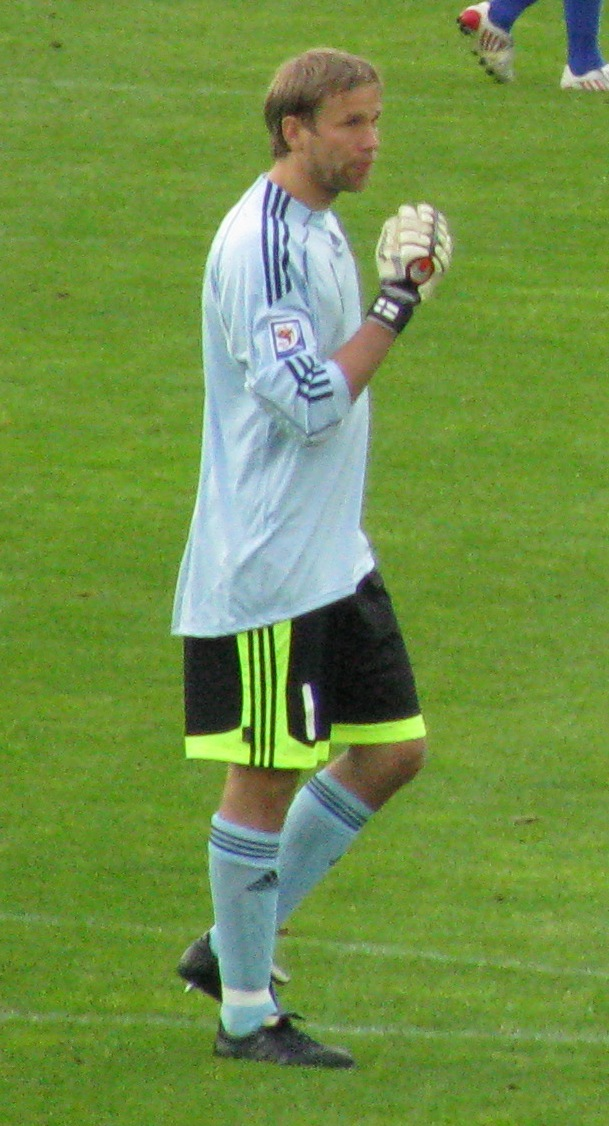
Jääskeläinen playing for Finland in 2009.

At the start of the FIFA World Cup qualification, Jääskeläinen helped Finland earn four points after drawing against Germany and Azerbaijan. In a match against Wales on 28 March 2009, he started the whole game and kept a clean sheet, in a 2–0 win. After the match, Jääskeläinen said he was happy with the performance and called it "one of the best games he played in the national team." However, Finland failed to qualify for the FIFA World Cup after finishing third in the qualifying campaign. On 29 October 2009, Jääskeläinen announced his retirement from international football having collected 55 caps for his country. In explaining his decision Jääskeläinen stated that he hoped that it would allow him to prolong his club career. However, on 6 October 2010 Jääskeläinen announced his comeback to national team in a match against Hungary as Otto Fredrikson was unable to play because of an injury but confirmed that this was just a one-off.

== Coaching career ==
In 2018 he was appointed as the goalkeeper coach at Wrexham by manager Sam Ricketts, a former team-mate at Bolton. Due to the speculation over Ricketts' job, Jääskeläinen, alongside Graham Barrow and Carl Darlington, took charge of Wrexham's second round FA Cup match against Newport County on 1 December. The match finished 0–0, meaning a replay would be played. Two days later, the departure of Ricketts was confirmed, and Barrow was named sole caretaker manager until a replacement was found. He left the club on 7 June 2019.

On 1 February 2024, Jääskeläinen started working as a goalkeeping coach of Finnish club PK-35 competing in the second-tier Ykkösliiga.

== Personal life ==
Jääskeläinen is married to Tessa and together, they have three sons, all of them were born in England. Jääskeläinen's eldest son Will Jääskeläinen plays for Woking FC, in the same position, having left Bolton in August 2017 without making a competitive senior appearance. He wears the shirt number 22, the same that his father did during his time at Bolton. His second son, Emil Jääskeläinen, plays for Sporting JAX of USL Championship. His youngest son, Robin, plays collegiate soccer in the United States. Former Bolton Wanderers’ goalkeeper coach and mentor Fred Barber said about Jääskeläinen: "He's a very modest person, just a nice family man. He loves his wife, loves his children and he's very quiet. But you have to admire him for what he's achieved."

Jääskeläinen is close friends with Tepi Moilanen. Growing up in Finland, he followed Liverpool, due to their history and reputation, and idolised Bruce Grobbelaar as the main inspiration for him to become a goalkeeper. Having lived in England since 1997, Jääskeläinen became a fan of cricket, saying about the sport: "Sometimes it lasts a bit too long, but I like the good bits. It's a decent game." Jääskeläinen consider himself an adopted Boltonian during his time at Bolton Wanderers. He also spoke out about getting used to playing football in December; in contrast to his home country’s football schedule. In 2021, Jääskeläinen moved back to Finland after spending 23 years away from the country.

Jääskeläinen also took part in charity and local communities work during his playing career at Bolton Wanderers. After his testimonial match against Hibernian on 8 August 2009, he donated the proceeds of the money contributed to three local charities.

Jääskeläinen has worked as a football studio commentator for Viaplay.

== Career statistics ==
=== Club ===
Appearances and goals by club, season and competition
Club	Season	League			National cup		League cup		Continental		Other		Total	
Club	Season	Division	Apps	Goals	Apps	Goals	Apps	Goals	Apps	Goals	Apps	Goals	Apps	Goals
MP Mikkeli	1992	Veikkausliiga	6	0			—		—		—		6	0
MP Mikkeli	1993	Veikkausliiga	6	0			—		—		—		6	0
MP Mikkeli	1994	Veikkausliiga	26	0					—		—		26	0
MP Mikkeli	1995	Veikkausliiga	26	0					—		—		26	0
MP Mikkeli	Total		64	0					—		—		64	0
VPS Vaasa	1996	Veikkausliiga	27	0					—		—		27	0
VPS Vaasa	1997	Veikkausliiga	27	0					—		—		27	0
VPS Vaasa	Total		54	0					—		—		54	0
Bolton Wanderers	1997–98	Premier League	0	0	0	0	0	0	—		—		0	0
Bolton Wanderers	1998–99	First Division	34	0	1	0	5	0	—		—		40	0
Bolton Wanderers	1999–2000	First Division	34	0	3	0	2	0	—		2	0	41	0
Bolton Wanderers	2000–01	First Division	27	0	0	0	0	0	—		0	0	27	0
Bolton Wanderers	2001–02	Premier League	34	0	1	0	3	0	—		—		38	0
Bolton Wanderers	2002–03	Premier League	38	0	0	0	0	0	—		—		38	0
Bolton Wanderers	2003–04	Premier League	38	0	0	0	3	0	—		—		41	0
Bolton Wanderers	2004–05	Premier League	36	0	4	0	0	0	—		—		40	0
Bolton Wanderers	2005–06	Premier League	38	0	3	0	2	0	5	0	—		48	0
Bolton Wanderers	2006–07	Premier League	38	0	2	0	0	0	—		—		40	0
Bolton Wanderers	2007–08	Premier League	28	0	0	0	1	0	6	0	—		35	0
Bolton Wanderers	2008–09	Premier League	38	0	1	0	1	0	—		—		40	0
Bolton Wanderers	2009–10	Premier League	38	0	3	0	2	0	—		—		43	0
Bolton Wanderers	2010–11	Premier League	35	0	3	0	0	0	—		—		38	0
Bolton Wanderers	2011–12	Premier League	18	0	0	0	0	0	—		—		18	0
Bolton Wanderers	Total		474	0	21	0	19	0	11	0	2	0	527	0
West Ham United	2012–13	Premier League	38	0	2	0	0	0	—		—		40	0
West Ham United	2013–14	Premier League	18	0	0	0	1	0	—		—		19	0
West Ham United	2014–15	Premier League	1	0	0	0	1	0	—		—		2	0
West Ham United	Total		57	0	2	0	2	0	—		—		61	0
Wigan Athletic	2015–16	League One	35	0	0	0	0	0	—		—		35	0
Wigan Athletic	2016–17	Championship	9	0	0	0	1	0	—		—		10	0
Wigan Athletic	Total		44	0	0	0	1	0	—		—		45	0
ATK	2017–18	Indian Super League	1	0	0	0	0	0	—		—		1	0
Career total			694	0	23	0	22	0	11	0	2	0	752	0

=== International ===
Appearances and goals by national team and year
National team	Year	Apps	Goals
Finland	1998	2	0
Finland	1999	2	0
Finland	2000	3	0
Finland	2001	0	0
Finland	2002	3	0
Finland	2003	6	0
Finland	2004	2	0
Finland	2005	7	0
Finland	2006	8	0
Finland	2007	9	0
Finland	2008	5	0
Finland	2009	8	0
Finland	2010	1	0
Total		56	0

== Honours ==
Bolton Wanderers

- Football League Cup runner-up: 2003–04

Wigan Athletic

- Football League One: 2015–16

Finland

- Nordic Football Championship: 2000–01

Individual

- Lion of Vienna Award: 2003–04
- Bolton Wanderers Player of the Year: 2006–07
- Finnish Footballer of the Year: 2007
- SBOBET Player of the Month: November 2012, February 2013
