= 2003–04 Bolton Wanderers F.C. season =

Bolton Wanderers
2003–04 season
- Chairman: Phil Gartside
- Manager: Sam Allardyce
- Stadium: Reebok Stadium
- Premier League: 8th
- FA Cup: Third round
- Carling Cup: Runners-up
- Top goalscorer: Kevin Nolan (10)
- Highest home attendance: 28,353 (vs. Leicester City, 28 December 2003)
- Lowest home attendance: 5,229 (vs Walsall, 24 September 2003)
Home colours	Away colours

The 2003–04 season was the 126th season in Bolton Wanderers F.C.'s existence, and was their third consecutive year in the top-flight. This article covers the period from 1 July 2003 to 30 June 2004.

== First-team squad ==
Note: Flags indicate national team as defined under FIFA eligibility rules; some limited exceptions apply. Players may hold more than one non-FIFA nationality.

No.	Pos.	Nation	Player
1	GK	ENG	Kevin Poole
2	DF	ENG	Anthony Barness
3	DF	ENG	Simon Charlton
4	MF	ENG	Kevin Nolan
5	DF	FRA	Bruno Ngotty
6	MF	FRA	Youri Djorkaeff
7	MF	GRE	Stelios Giannakopoulos
8	MF	DEN	Per Frandsen
9	FW	DEN	Henrik Pedersen
10	MF	NGA	Jay-Jay Okocha
11	MF	JAM	Ricardo Gardner
13	FW	BRA	Mário Jardel
14	FW	ENG	Kevin Davies

No.	Pos.	Nation	Player
15	MF	FRA	Ibrahim Ba
16	DF	ESP	Iván Campo
17	DF	FRA	Florent Laville
18	DF	ENG	Nicky Hunt
20	MF	ENG	Jeff Smith
22	GK	FIN	Jussi Jääskeläinen
23	DF	ENG	Danny Livesey
25	FW	ESP	Javi Moreno (on loan from Atlético Madrid)
26	DF	BRA	Emerson Thome
31	DF	ENG	Charlie Comyn-Platt
32	FW	POR	Ricardo Vaz Tê
36	FW	ENG	Ricky Shakes
42	DF	ENG	Steve Howey

=== Left club during season ===
Note: Flags indicate national team as defined under FIFA eligibility rules; some limited exceptions apply. Players may hold more than one non-FIFA nationality.

No.	Pos.	Nation	Player
12	FW	IRL	Jonathan Walters (to Hull City)
19	FW	ENG	Delroy Facey (to West Bromwich Albion)
19	DF	ENG	Jon Otsemobor (on loan from Liverpool)
21	MF	IRL	Gareth Farrelly (to Wigan Athletic)

No.	Pos.	Nation	Player
24	MF	JAM	Jermaine Johnson (to Oldham Athletic)
25	MF	ENG	Glen Little (on loan from Burnley)
28	MF	JAM	Cleveland Taylor (to Scunthorpe United)

== Reserve squad ==
Note: Flags indicate national team as defined under FIFA eligibility rules; some limited exceptions apply. Players may hold more than one non-FIFA nationality.

No.	Pos.	Nation	Player
27	MF	SCO	Derek Niven
29	DF	COD	Kangana Lord N'Diwa
30	GK	FRA	Jeremy Bon
33	MF	ENG	Lewis Hamlin

No.	Pos.	Nation	Player
34	DF	ENG	Jason Talbot
35	GK	JAM	Donovan Ricketts (on loan from Village United)
37	FW	GUA	Dwight Pezzarossi (on loan from Communicaciones)

== Transfers ==
=== In ===
- (Greece) Stelios Giannakopoulos - (Greece) Olympiacos, 28 May 2003
- (Spain) Iván Campo - (Spain) Real Madrid, free transfer, 18 July 2003
- (England) Kevin Davies - (England) Southampton, free transfer, 23 July 2003
- (Portugal) Ricardo Vaz Tê - (Portugal) S.C. Farense, free transfer, 27 August 2003
- (Brazil) Mário Jardel - (Portugal) Sporting CP, free transfer, 13 August 2003
- (Brazil) Emerson Thome - Sunderland, free transfer, 29 August 2003
- (France) Ibrahim Ba - (Italy) Milan, free transfer, 11 September 2003
- (England) Glen Little - (England) Burnley, month loan, 1 September 2003
- (Jamaica) Donovan Ricketts - (Jamaica) Village United, five-month loan, 2 January 2004
- (Spain) Javi Moreno - (Spain) Atlético Madrid, five-month loan, 5 January 2004
- (England) Steve Howey - (England) Leicester City, free transfer, 29 January 2004
- (Guatemala) Dwight Pezzarossi - (Guatemala) Comunicaciones, four-month loan, 30 January 2004
- (England) Jon Otsemobor - (England) Liverpool, four-month loan, 2 February 2004

=== Out ===
- (Scotland) Colin Hendry - retired
- (Iceland) Guðni Bergsson - retired
- (England) Leam Richardson - released (later joined (England) Blackpool on 23 June 2003)
- (England) Mike Whitlow - released (later joined (England) Sheffield United in 2003)
- (England) Paul Warhurst - released (later joined (England) Chesterfield in October 2003)
- (Republic of Ireland) Jonathan Walters - (England) Hull City, 2004
- (Turkey) Bülent Akın - (Turkey) Akçaabat Sebatspor
- (Republic of Ireland) Gareth Farrelly - (England) Wigan Athletic
- (Grenada) Delroy Facey - (England) West Bromwich Albion
- (England) Chris Armstrong - (Wales) Wrexham
- (French Polynesia) Gerald Forschelet - (Switzerland) Neuchâtel Xamax
- (Jamaica) Cleveland Taylor - (England) Scunthorpe United
- (England) Jon Otsemobor - (England) Liverpool, loan end

== Results ==
=== FA Premier League ===
Matchday	1	2	3	4	5	6	7	8	9	10	11	12	13	14	15	16	17	18	19	20	21	22	23	24	25	26	27	28	29	30	31	32	33	34	35	36	37	38
Ground	A	H	A	H	H	A	H	A	A	H	A	H	A	H	A	A	H	A	H	H	A	H	A	H	A	H	A	H	A	H	A	H	A	H	A	H	A	H
Result	L	D	L	D	W	D	D	D	L	L	W	D	W	W	L	W	D	L	D	L	W	W	W	D	D	L	L	L	L	W	L	D	W	W	W	W	W	L
Position	20	18	19	18	16	13	15	16	16	18	15	14	14	11	13	10	10	10	12	13	11	10	9	10	10	11	12	13	13	13	13	12	12	12	10	7	7	8

Updated to match(es) played on 11 May 2003. Source: Statto.com
A = Away; H = Home; W = Win; D = Draw; L = Loss

Date	Opponents	H / A	Result F – A	Scorers	Attendance
16 August 2003	Manchester United	A	0 – 4		67,647
23 August 2003	Blackburn Rovers	H	2 – 2	Djorkaeff 3' (pen), Davies 25'	27,423
26 August 2003	Portsmouth	A	0 – 4		20,113
30 August 2003	Charlton Athletic	H	0 – 0		23,098
13 September 2003	Middlesbrough	H	2 – 0	Davies 23', Ngotty 81'	26,419
20 September 2003	Newcastle United	A	0 – 0		52,014
27 September 2003	Wolverhampton Wanderers	H	1 – 1	Davies 85'	27,043
5 October 2003	Aston Villa	A	1 – 1	Nolan 46'	30,229
18 October 2003	Manchester City	A	2 – 6	Nolan 25', Campo 60'	47,101
25 October 2003	Birmingham City	H	0 – 1		25,023
1 November 2003	Tottenham Hotspur	A	1 – 0	Nolan 73'	35,191
8 November 2003	Southampton	H	0 – 0		25,619
22 November 2003	Leeds United	A	2 – 0	Davies 16', Stelios 17'	36,558
29 November 2003	Everton	H	2 – 0	Frandsen 26', Djorkaeff 46'	27,350
6 December 2003	Fulham	A	1 – 2	Davies 53'	14,393
13 December 2003	Chelsea	A	2 – 1	Ngotty 39', Terry 90' (og)	40,491
20 December 2003	Arsenal	H	1 – 1	Pedersen 83'	28,003
26 December 2003	Liverpool	A	1 – 3	Pedersen 85'	42,987
28 December 2003	Leicester City	H	2 – 2	Ngotty 35', Campo 54'	28,353
7 January 2004	Manchester United	H	1 – 2	Gary Neville (og) 89'	27,668
10 January 2004	Blackburn Rovers	A	4 – 3	Nolan (2) 1', 78', Djorkaeff 43', Stelios 73'	23,538
17 January 2004	Portsmouth	H	1 – 0	Davies 53'	26,558
31 January 2004	Charlton Athletic	A	2 – 1	Pedersen 1', Nolan 78'	26,249
7 February 2004	Liverpool	H	2 – 2	Hunt 11', Djorkaeff 58'	27,552
10 February 2004	Leicester City	A	1 – 1	Walker 33' (og)	26,674
21 February 2004	Manchester City	H	1 – 3	Nolan 22'	27,301
6 March 2004	Birmingham City	A	0 – 2		28,003
13 March 2004	Chelsea	H	0 – 2		26,717
20 March 2004	Arsenal	A	1 – 2	Campo 41'	38,053
28 March 2004	Newcastle United	H	1 – 0	Pedersen 4'	27,360
3 April 2004	Middlesbrough	A	0 – 2		30,107
10 April 2004	Aston Villa	H	2 – 2	Pedersen 48', Davies 86'	26,374
12 April 2004	Wolverhampton Wanderers	A	2 – 1	Pedersen 43', Davies 90'	26,895
17 April 2004	Tottenham Hotspur	H	2 – 0	Campo 7', Pedersen 65'	26,440
24 April 2004	Southampton	A	2 – 1	Nolan 77', Davies 78'	31,712
2 May 2004	Leeds United	H	4 – 1	Djorkaeff (2) 47', 53', Harte 55' (og), Nolan 78'	27,420
8 May 2004	Everton	A	2 – 1	Djorkaeff (2) 14', 87'	40,191
15 May 2004	Fulham	H	0 – 2		27,383

Pos	Team	Pld	W	D	L	GF	GA	GD	Pts
6	Aston Villa	38	15	11	12	48	44	+4	56
7	Charlton Athletic	38	14	11	13	51	51	0	53
8	Bolton Wanderers	38	14	11	13	48	56	−8	53
9	Fulham	38	14	10	14	52	46	+6	52
10	Birmingham City	38	12	14	12	43	48	−5	50

Source: Premier League
Rules for classification: 1) points; 2) goal difference; 3) number of goals scored.

=== FA Cup ===
Date	Round	Opponents	H / A	Result F – A	Scorers	Attendance
3 January 2004	Round 3	Tranmere Rovers	A	1-1	Nolan 78'	10,587
14 February 2004	Round 3 replay	Tranmere Rovers	H	1-2 (aet)	Shakes	8,759

=== Carling Cup ===
Date	Round	Opponents	H / A	Result F – A	Scorers	Attendance
24 September 2003	Round 2	Walsall	H	3-1	Jardel (2) 15', 80', Nolan 69'	5,229
28 October 2003	Round 3	Gillingham	H	2-0	Stelios 25', Pedersen 66'	5,258
3 December 2003	Round 4	Liverpool	A	3-2	Jardel 4', Okocha 79', Djorkaeff 90' (pen)	33,185
16 December 2003	Round 5	Southampton	H	1-0 (aet)	Pedersen 115'	13,957
21 January 2004	Semi-final first leg	Aston Villa	H	5-2	Okocha (2) 2', 80', Nolan 9', Stelios 17', Ngotty 74'	16,302
27 January 2004	Semi-final second leg	Aston Villa	A	0-2; 5-4 (agg)		36,883
29 February 2004	Final	Middlesbrough	N	1-2	Davies 21'	72,634

== Statistics ==
=== Appearances ===
Bolton used a total of 29 players during the season.

P	Player	Position	PL	FAC	LC	Total
1	(Spain) Iván Campo	Midfielder	37 (1)	0 (0)	6 (0)	43 (1)
2	(England) Kevin Davies	Striker	38 (0)	0 (0)	4 (1)	42 (1)
3	(England) Kevin Nolan	Midfielder	37 (0)	0 (2)	4 (0)	41 (2)
4	(Finland) Jussi Jääskeläinen	Goalkeeper	38 (0)	0 (0)	3 (0)	41 (0)
5	(Nigeria) Jay-Jay Okocha	Midfielder	33 (2)	0 (0)	5 (1)	38 (3)
6	(France) Bruno Ngotty	Defender	32 (1)	0 (0)	6 (0)	38 (1)
7	(England) Simon Charlton	Defender	28 (3)	0 (0)	5 (2)	33 (5)
8	(Brazil) Emerson Thome	Defender	25 (1)	1 (0)	5 (0)	31 (1)
9	(France) Youri Djorkaeff	Midfielder	25 (2)	0 (0)	4 (1)	29 (3)
10	(Denmark) Henrik Pedersen	Striker	19 (14)	2 (0)	4 (3)	25 (17)
11	(Denmark) Per Frandsen	Midfielder	22 (11)	1 (1)	2 (1)	25 (13)
12	(Greece) Stelios Giannakopoulos	Midfielder	18 (13)	2 (0)	4 (2)	24 (15)
13	(Jamaica) Ricardo Gardner	Defender/Midfielder	20 (2)	0 (0)	2 (2)	22 (4)
14	(England) Anthony Barness	Defender	11 (4)	2 (0)	4 (2)	17 (6)
15	(France) Ibrahim Ba	Midfielder	0 (9)	1 (0)	5 (1)	6 (10)
16	(England) Kevin Poole	Goalkeeper	0 (0)	2 (0)	4 (0)	6 (0)
17	(France) Florent Laville	Defender	5 (0)	0 (0)	0 (0)	5 (0)
18	(Brazil) Mario Jardel	Striker	0 (7)	1 (0)	3 (1)	4 (8)
19=	(England) Charlie Comyn-Platt	Defender	0 (0)	2 (0)	0 (1)	2 (1)
19=	(England) Delroy Facey	Striker	0 (1)	2 (0)	0 (0)	2 (1)
19=	(England) Steve Howey	Defender	2 (1)	0 (0)	0 (0)	2 (1)
22=	(England) Danny Livesey	Defender	0 (0)	2 (0)	0 (0)	2 (0)
22=	(England) Jeff Smith	Midfielder	0 (0)	2 (0)	0 (0)	2 (2)
24	(Spain) Javi Moreno	Striker	1 (7)	0 (0)	0 (2)	1 (9)
25	(Portugal) Ricardo Vaz Tê	Striker	0 (1)	1 (1)	0 (0)	1 (2)
26	(England) Jon Otsemobor	Defender	1 (0)	0 (0)	0 (0)	1 (0)
27	(England) Glen Little	Midfielder	0 (4)	0 (0)	0 (0)	0 (4)
28=	(Trinidad and Tobago) Ricky Shakes	Defender	0 (0)	0 (1)	0 (0)	0 (1)
28=	(Jamaica) Cleveland Taylor	Midfielder	0 (0)	0 (1)	0 (0)	0 (1)

=== Top scorers ===
P	Player	Position	PL	FAC	LC	Total
1	(England) Kevin Nolan	Midfielder	9	1	2	12
2=	(England) Kevin Davies	Striker	9	0	1	10
2=	(France) Youri Djorkaeff	Midfielder	8	0	1	9
2=	(Denmark) Henrik Pedersen	Striker	7	0	2	9
5=	(Greece) Stelios Giannakopoulos	Midfielder	2	0	2	4
5=	(France) Bruno Ngotty	Defender	3	0	1	4
