= 2004–05 Bolton Wanderers F.C. season =

Bolton Wanderers
2004–05 season
- Chairman: Phil Gartside
- Manager: Sam Allardyce
- Stadium: Reebok Stadium
- FA Premier League: 6th
- FA Cup: Sixth round
- League Cup: Fourth round
- Top goalscorer: League: El Hadji Diouf (9); All: Kevin Davies; El Hadji Diouf; Henrik Pedersen (9)
- Highest home attendance: 27,880 (vs. Liverpool, 29 August)
- Lowest home attendance: 16,151 (vs. Fulham, 19 February 2005)
Home colours	Away colours	Third colours

The 2004–05 season was the 127th season in Bolton Wanderers F.C.'s existence, and was their fourth consecutive year in the top-flight. This article covers the period from 1 July 2004 to 30 June 2005.

== Season summary ==
Bolton finished in sixth place in the final Premiership table - tied on points but one place behind that season's European champions Liverpool, and three points off qualification for the Champions League. As it was, sixth place was enough to grant Bolton their first ever excursion into European competition, in the UEFA Cup.

== First-team squad ==
Note: Flags indicate national team as defined under FIFA eligibility rules; some limited exceptions apply. Players may hold more than one non-FIFA nationality.

No.	Pos.	Nation	Player
1	GK	ENG	Kevin Poole
2	DF	ENG	Anthony Barness
3	DF	BRA	Júlio César
4	MF	ENG	Kevin Nolan
5	DF	FRA	Bruno Ngotty
6	MF	WAL	Gary Speed
7	MF	GRE	Stelios Giannakopoulos
9	FW	DEN	Henrik Pedersen
10	MF	NGA	Jay-Jay Okocha (captain)
11	MF	JAM	Ricardo Gardner
14	FW	ENG	Kevin Davies
15	DF	TUN	Radhi Jaïdi
16	DF	ESP	Iván Campo

No.	Pos.	Nation	Player
17	DF	FRA	Florent Laville
18	DF	ENG	Nicky Hunt
20	DF	ESP	Fernando Hierro
21	FW	SEN	El Hadji Diouf (on loan from Liverpool)
22	GK	FIN	Jussi Jääskeläinen
23	DF	FRA	Vincent Candela
24	MF	NGA	Blessing Kaku
26	DF	ISR	Tal Ben Haim
28	FW	POR	Ricardo Vaz Tê
30	FW	ENG	Ricky Shakes (Note: Shakes was born in Brixton, England, but also qualified to represent Trinidad and Tobago and Guyana internationally. He won his first cap for Trinidad and Tobago in a friendly game in 2006, and made his full international debut for Guyana in October 2011.)
33	MF	IRL	Joey O'Brien
39	MF	SEN	Khalilou Fadiga

=== Left club during season ===
Note: Flags indicate national team as defined under FIFA eligibility rules; some limited exceptions apply. Players may hold more than one non-FIFA nationality.

No.	Pos.	Nation	Player
8	FW	ENG	Michael Bridges (to Sunderland)
13	GK	ENG	Andy Oakes (on loan from Derby County)

No.	Pos.	Nation	Player
23	FW	ENG	Les Ferdinand (to Reading)
-	DF	ENG	Danny Livesey (to Carlisle United)

== Reserve squad ==
Note: Flags indicate national team as defined under FIFA eligibility rules; some limited exceptions apply. Players may hold more than one non-FIFA nationality.

No.	Pos.	Nation	Player
31	DF	ENG	Charlie Comyn-Platt
32	DF	ENG	Jason Talbot

No.	Pos.	Nation	Player
34	FW	FRA	Bédi Buval
35	DF	ENG	Bradley Hill

== Transfers ==
=== In ===
- (England) Michael Bridges - (England) Leeds United, free, 9 June
- (England) Les Ferdinand - (England) Leicester City, free, 5 July
- (Tunisia) Radhi Jaïdi - (Tunisia) Espérance, free, 6 July
- (Wales) Gary Speed - (England) Newcastle United, £750,000, 21 July
- (Spain) Fernando Hierro - (Qatar) Al Rayyan, free, 28 July
- (Israel) Tal Ben Haim - (Israel) Maccabi Tel Aviv, £203,000, 28 July
- (Senegal) El Hadji Diouf - (England) Liverpool, season loan, 19 August
- (Nigeria) Blessing Kaku - (Israel) F.C. Ashdod, free transfer, 24 August
- (Senegal) Khalilou Fadiga - (Italy) Internazionale, free, 14 September
- (France) Vincent Candela - (Italy) Roma, free transfer, 31 January
- (Brazil) Júlio César - (Spain) Real Valladolid, free, July

=== Out ===
- (England) Simon Charlton - (England) Norwich City, £250,000, 13 July
- (England) Jeff Smith - (England) Port Vale, free, 22 June
- (Denmark) Per Frandsen - (England) Wigan Athletic, free, 24 June
- (Brazil) Emerson Thome - (England) Wigan Athletic, free, 4 August
- (Brazil) Mário Jardel - (Argentina) Newell's Old Boys, free, 13 August
- (France) Ibrahim Ba - (Turkey) Çaykur Rizespor, free, 24 August
- (England) Michael Bridges - (England) Sunderland, season loan, 23 September
- (France) Youri Djorkaeff - (England) Blackburn Rovers, free, 28 September
- (England) Les Ferdinand - (England) Reading, free, 6 January
- (England) Danny Livesey - (England) Carlisle United, month loan, 25 December
- (England) Danny Livesey - (England) Carlisle United, free, 25 January
- (Republic of Ireland) Joey O'Brien - (England) Sheffield Wednesday, loan
- (Scotland) Derek Niven - (England) Chesterfield
- Steve Howey - (United States) New England Revolution, free
- (Democratic Republic of the Congo) Ndiwa Lord-Kangana - released
- (France) Jeremy Bon - released
- (England) Lewis Hamlin - released

Note: All players listed as joining other clubs from Bolton on a free transfer were released by the club on 17 May 2004, with the exception of Ferdinand, who was released on 2 January 2005.

== Competitions ==
=== Premier League ===
==== Final league table ====
Pos	Team	Pld	W	D	L	GF	GA	GD	Pts	Qualification or relegation
4	Everton	38	18	7	13	45	46	−1	61	Qualification for the Champions League third qualifying round
5	Liverpool	38	17	7	14	52	41	+11	58	Qualification for the Champions League first qualifying round (Note: Although they failed to qualify for the Champions League as one of the top four English clubs, Liverpool were given a special dispensation to compete as the defending champions. They were, however, forced to enter in the first qualifying round.)
6	Bolton Wanderers	38	16	10	12	49	44	+5	58	Qualification for the UEFA Cup first round (Note: Since the finalists of the FA Cup, Arsenal and Manchester United, as well as Chelsea, who won the 2004–05 Football League Cup, were qualified for the Champions League, and the fifth-placed team (Liverpool) were moved to the Champions League, the sixth and seventh-placed teams in the Premier League were rewarded entry to the UEFA Cup.)
7	Middlesbrough	38	14	13	11	53	46	+7	55	Qualification for the UEFA Cup first round
8	Manchester City	38	13	13	12	47	39	+8	52	

Rules for classification: 1) points; 2) goal difference; 3) number of goals scored.

==== Results by matchday ====
Matchday	1	2	3	4	5	6	7	8	9	10	11	12	13	14	15	16	17	18	19	20	21	22	23	24	25	26	27	28	29	30	31	32	33	34	35	36	37	38
Ground	H	A	A	H	H	A	H	A	H	A	H	A	H	A	H	A	A	H	A	H	H	A	H	A	H	A	H	A	A	H	A	H	A	H	A	H	A	H
Result	W	L	W	W	D	D	D	L	W	W	W	D	L	D	L	L	L	L	L	L	D	W	W	W	W	W	D	L	W	W	L	W	W	D	D	L	D	W
Position	2	7	3	3	3	4	4	7	4	4	4	4	5	7	8	8	9	11	13	13	14	11	11	9	8	7	6	8	6	6	6	5	6	6	6	6	6	6

Source: Statto.com
A = Away; H = Home; W = Win; D = Draw; L = Loss

==== Matches ====
14 August 2004	Bolton Wanderers	4–1	Charlton Athletic	Reebok Stadium
15:00	Okocha 11', 59'; Pedersen 30', 72'	Report	Lisbie 67'	Attendance: 24,100; Referee: Phil Dowd

21 August 2004	Fulham	2–0	Bolton Wanderers	Craven Cottage
15:00	Cole 5', 82'	Report		Attendance: 17,541; Referee: Rob Styles

25 August 2004	Southampton	1–2	Bolton Wanderers	St Mary's Stadium
19:45	Crouch 85'	Report	Pedersen 7'; Okocha 27' (pen.)	Attendance: 30,713; Referee: Steve Dunn

29 August 2004	Bolton Wanderers	1–0	Liverpool	Reebok Stadium
16:05	Davies 38'	Report		Attendance: 27,880; Referee: Phil Dowd

11 September 2004	Bolton Wanderers	2–2	Manchester United	Reebok Stadium
15:00	Nolan 52'; Ferdinand 90'	Report	Heinze 44'; Hunt 90' (o.g.)	Attendance: 27,766; Referee: Matt Messias

18 September 2004	Arsenal	2–2	Bolton Wanderers	Highbury
12:45	Henry 31'; Pires 66'	Report	Jaïdi 63'; Pedersen 85'	Attendance: 37,010; Referee: Phil Dowd

25 September 2004	Bolton Wanderers	1–1	Birmingham City	Reebok Stadium
15:00	Jaïdi 16'	Report	Izzet 49'	Attendance: 23,692; Referee: Rob Styles

2 October 2004	West Bromwich Albion	2–1	Bolton Wanderers	The Hawthorns
17:15	Kanu 57'; Gera 65'	Report	Stelios 73'	Attendance: 23,849; Referee: Mark Clattenburg

16 October 2004	Bolton Wanderers	1–0	Crystal Palace	Reebok Stadium
15:00	Davies 45'	Report		Attendance: 25,051; Referee: Neale Barry

23 October 2004	Tottenham Hotspur	1–2	Bolton Wanderers	White Hart Lane
15:00	Keane 41'	Report	Jaïdi 11'; Pedersen 75'	Attendance: 36,025; Referee: Chris Foy

31 October 2004	Bolton Wanderers	2–1	Newcastle United	Reebok Stadium
16:05	Diouf 52'; Davies 70'	Report	Ambrose 55'	Attendance: 27,196; Referee: Graham Poll

7 November 2004	Middlesbrough	1–1	Bolton Wanderers	Riverside Stadium
14:00	Boateng 90'	Report	Pedersen 72'	Attendance: 29,656; Referee: Peter Walton

13 November 2004	Bolton Wanderers	1–2	Aston Villa	Reebok Stadium
15:00	Diouf 21'	Report	McCann 41'; Hitzlsperger 89'	Attendance: 25,779; Referee: Andy D'Urso

20 November 2004	Chelsea	2–2	Bolton Wanderers	Stamford Bridge
15:00	Duff 1'; Tiago 48'	Report	Davies 52'; Jaïdi 87'	Attendance: 42,203; Referee: Dermot Gallagher

27 November 2004	Bolton Wanderers	0–1	Portsmouth	Reebok Stadium
15:00		Report	De Zeeuw 45'	Attendance: 25,008; Referee: Steve Dunn

4 December 2004	Everton	3–2	Bolton Wanderers	Goodison Park
15:00	Ferguson 45'; Gravesen 75'; Jaïdi 85' (o.g.)	Report	Davies 16', 59'	Attendance: 35,929; Referee: Howard Webb

11 December 2004	Norwich City	3–2	Bolton Wanderers	Carrow Road
15:00	Svensson 19', 84'; Huckerby 69' (pen.)	Report	Okocha 19' (pen.); Hierro 23'	Attendance: 23,549; Referee: Barry Knight

18 December 2004	Bolton Wanderers	0–1	Manchester City	Reebok Stadium
19:45		Report	Barton 52'	Attendance: 27,274; Referee: Uriah Rennie

26 December 2004	Manchester United	2–0	Bolton Wanderers	Old Trafford
15:00	Giggs 10'; Scholes 89'	Report		Attendance: 67,867; Referee: Dermot Gallagher

28 December 2004	Bolton Wanderers	0–1	Blackburn Rovers	Reebok Stadium
15:00		Report	Dickov 6'	Attendance: 27,038; Referee: Rob Styles

1 January 2005	Bolton Wanderers	1–1	West Bromwich Albion	Reebok Stadium
15:00	Diouf 85'	Report	Gera 13'	Attendance: 25,205; Referee: Mike Dean

4 January 2005	Birmingham City	1–2	Bolton Wanderers	St Andrew's
19:45	Upson 66'	Report	Diouf 17'; Nolan 90'	Attendance: 27,177; Referee: Uriah Rennie

15 January 2005	Bolton Wanderers	1–0	Arsenal	Reebok Stadium
17:15	Stelios 41'	Report		Attendance: 27,514; Referee: Mark Clattenburg

24 January 2005	Blackburn Rovers	0–1	Bolton Wanderers	Ewood Park
20:00		Report	Diouf 77'	Attendance: 20,056; Referee: Steve Bennett

1 February 2005	Bolton Wanderers	3–1	Tottenham Hotspur	Reebok Stadium
20:00	Diouf 49' (pen.); Ben Haim 86'; Davies 87'	Report	Defoe 66'	Attendance: 24,780; Referee: Mike Dean

11 February 2005	Crystal Palace	0–1	Bolton Wanderers	Selhurst Park
15:00		Report	Nolan 31'	Attendance: 23,163; Referee: Graham Poll

12 February 2005	Bolton Wanderers	0–0	Middlesbrough	Reebok Stadium
17:15		Report		Attendance: 24,322; Referee: Alan Wiley

27 February 2005	Newcastle United	2–1	Bolton Wanderers	St James' Park
13:00	Bowyer 35'; Dyer 69'	Report	Stelios 41'	Attendance: 50,430; Referee: Steve Dunn

7 March 2005	Manchester City	0–1	Bolton Wanderers	City of Manchester Stadium
20:00		Report	Diouf 45+1'	Attendance: 43,050; Referee: Alan Wiley

19 March 2005	Bolton Wanderers	1–0	Norwich City	Reebok Stadium
17:15	Stelios 41'	Report		Attendance: 25,081; Referee: Mark Clattenburg

2 April 2005	Liverpool	1–0	Bolton Wanderers	Anfield
15:00	Biscan 86'	Report		Attendance: 43,755; Referee: Steve Bennett

9 April 2005	Bolton Wanderers	3–1	Fulham	Reebok Stadium
15:00	Okocha 13' (pen.); Nolan 33'; Stelios 54'	Report	Boa Morte 47'	Attendance: 25,493; Referee: Dermot Gallagher

16 March 2005	Charlton Athletic	1–2	Bolton Wanderers	The Valley
15:00	Jeffers 29'	Report	Okocha 7' (pen.); Diouf 58'	Attendance: 26,708; Referee: Alan Wiley

19 April 2005	Bolton Wanderers	1–1	Southampton	Reebok Stadium
20:00	Stelios 25'	Report	Kevin Phillips 69'	Attendance: 25,125; Referee: Mark Clattenburg

23 April 2005	Aston Villa	1–1	Bolton Wanderers	Villa Park
15:00	Hierro 26' (o.g.)	Report	Speed 54'	Attendance: 36,053; Referee: Uriah Rennie

30 April 2005	Bolton Wanderers	0–2	Chelsea	Reebok Stadium
17:15		Report	Lampard 60', 76'	Attendance: 27,653; Referee: Uriah Rennie

7 May 2005	Portsmouth	1–1	Bolton Wanderers	Fratton Park
15:00	Yakubu 72'	Report	Diouf 11'	Attendance: 20,188; Referee: Matt Messias

15 May 2005	Bolton Wanderers	3–2	Everton	Reebok Stadium
15:00	Jaïdi 53'; Davies 61'; Stelios 66'	Report	Cahill 9'; Carsley 63'	Attendance: 27,701; Referee: Matt Messias

=== FA Cup ===
8 January 2005 Third round	Ipswich Town	1–3	Bolton Wanderers	Portman Road
15:00	Miller 70'	Report	Stelios 60'; Pedersen 65' 68'	Attendance: 20,080; Referee: Steve Bennett

30 January 2005 Fourth round	Oldham Athletic	0–1	Bolton Wanderers	Boundary Park
13:45		Report	Vaz Tê 9'	Attendance: 12,029; Referee: Matt Messias

19 February 2005 Fifth round	Bolton Wanderers	1–0	Fulham	Reebok Stadium
15:00	Davies 12'	Report		Attendance: 16,151; Referee: Howard Webb

12 March 2005 Sixth round	Bolton Wanderers	0–1	Arsenal	Reebok Stadium
12:15		Report	Ljungberg 3'	Attendance: 23,523; Referee: Steve Bennett

=== League Cup ===
21 September 2004 Second round	Yeovil Town	0–2	Bolton Wanderers	Huish Park
19:45		Report	Julio Cesar 80'; Pedersen 87'	Attendance: 8,047; Referee: Dermot Gallagher

27 October 2004 Third round	Bolton Wanderers	3–4 (a.e.t.)	Tottenham Hotspur	Reebok Stadium
20:00	King 27' (o.g.); Okocha 75' (pen.); Ferdinand 105'	Report	Defoe 44', 103'; Bunjevčević 84'; Brown 95'	Attendance: 18,037; Referee: Mike Dean

== Statistics ==
=== Appearances ===
Bolton used a total of 26 players during the season.

P	Player	Position	PL	FAC	LC	Total
1	(France) Bruno Ngotty	Defender	37 (0)	4 (0)	0 (0)	41 (0)
2	(Finland) Jussi Jääskeläinen	Goalkeeper	36 (0)	4 (0)	0 (0)	40 (0)
3	(Wales) Gary Speed	Midfielder	37 (1)	2 (0)	0 (0)	39 (1)
4	(England) Kevin Davies	Striker	33 (1)	4 (0)	1 (1)	38 (2)
5	(Jamaica) Ricardo Gardner	Defender/Midfielder	30 (3)	3 (1)	1 (0)	34 (4)
6	(England) Nicky Hunt	Defender	29 (0)	3 (1)	1 (0)	33 (1)
7	(England) Kevin Nolan	Midfielder	27 (9)	2 (0)	2 (2)	31 (11)
8	(Greece) Stelios Giannakopoulos	Midfielder	28 (6)	1 (1)	2 (0)	31 (7)
9	(Nigeria) Jay-Jay Okocha	Midfielder	29 (2)	1 (0)	1 (0)	31 (2)
10	(Senegal) El Hadji Diouf	Midfielder/Striker	23 (4)	2 (0)	1 (2)	26 (6)
11	(Israel) Tal Ben Haim	Defender	19 (2)	4 (0)	2 (0)	25 (2)
12	(Spain) Iván Campo	Defender/Midfielder	21 (7)	1 (1)	0 (0)	22 (8)
13	(Tunisia) Radhi Jaïdi	Defender	21 (7)	1 (0)	0 (0)	22 (7)
14	(Spain) Fernando Hierro	Midfielder	15 (14)	4 (0)	2 (0)	21 (14)
15	(Denmark) Henrik Pedersen	Striker	13 (14)	3 (1)	1 (1)	17 (16)
16	(France) Vincent Candela	Defender	9 (1)	1 (1)	0 (0)	10 (2)
17	(England) Anthony Barness	Defender	5 (3)	0 (2)	1 (0)	6 (5)
18	(Spain) Julio Cesar	Defender	4 (1)	0 (0)	2 (0)	6 (1)
19	(Portugal) Ricardo Vaz Tê	Striker	1 (6)	2 (0)	0 (0)	3 (6)
20	(Senegal) Khalilou Fadiga	Midfielder	0 (5)	3 (0)	0 (0)	3 (5)
21	(England) Kevin Poole	Goalkeeper	1 (1)	0 (0)	2 (0)	3 (1)
22	(England) Les Ferdinand	Striker	1 (11)	0 (0)	1 (1)	2 (12)
23	(Nigeria) Blessing Kaku	Midfielder	0 (1)	0 (0)	1 (1)	1 (2)
24	(England) Andy Oakes	Goalkeeper	1 (0)	0 (0)	0 (0)	1 (0)
25	(Republic of Ireland) Joey O'Brien	Defender/Midfielder	0 (1)	0 (0)	0 (1)	0 (2)
26	(Trinidad and Tobago) Ricky Shakes	Midfielder	0 (0)	0 (0)	0 (1)	0 (1)

=== Top scorers ===
P	Player	Position	PL	FAC	LC	Total
1	(England) Kevin Davies	Striker	8	1	0	9
1	(Senegal) El Hadji Diouf	Midfielder/Striker	9	0	0	9
1	(Denmark) Henrik Pedersen	Striker	6	2	1	9
4	(Greece) Stelios Giannakopoulos	Midfielder	7	1	0	8
5	(Nigeria) Jay-Jay Okocha	Midfielder	6	0	1	7
