= Jamie Jackson (footballer) =

British footballer (born 1986)

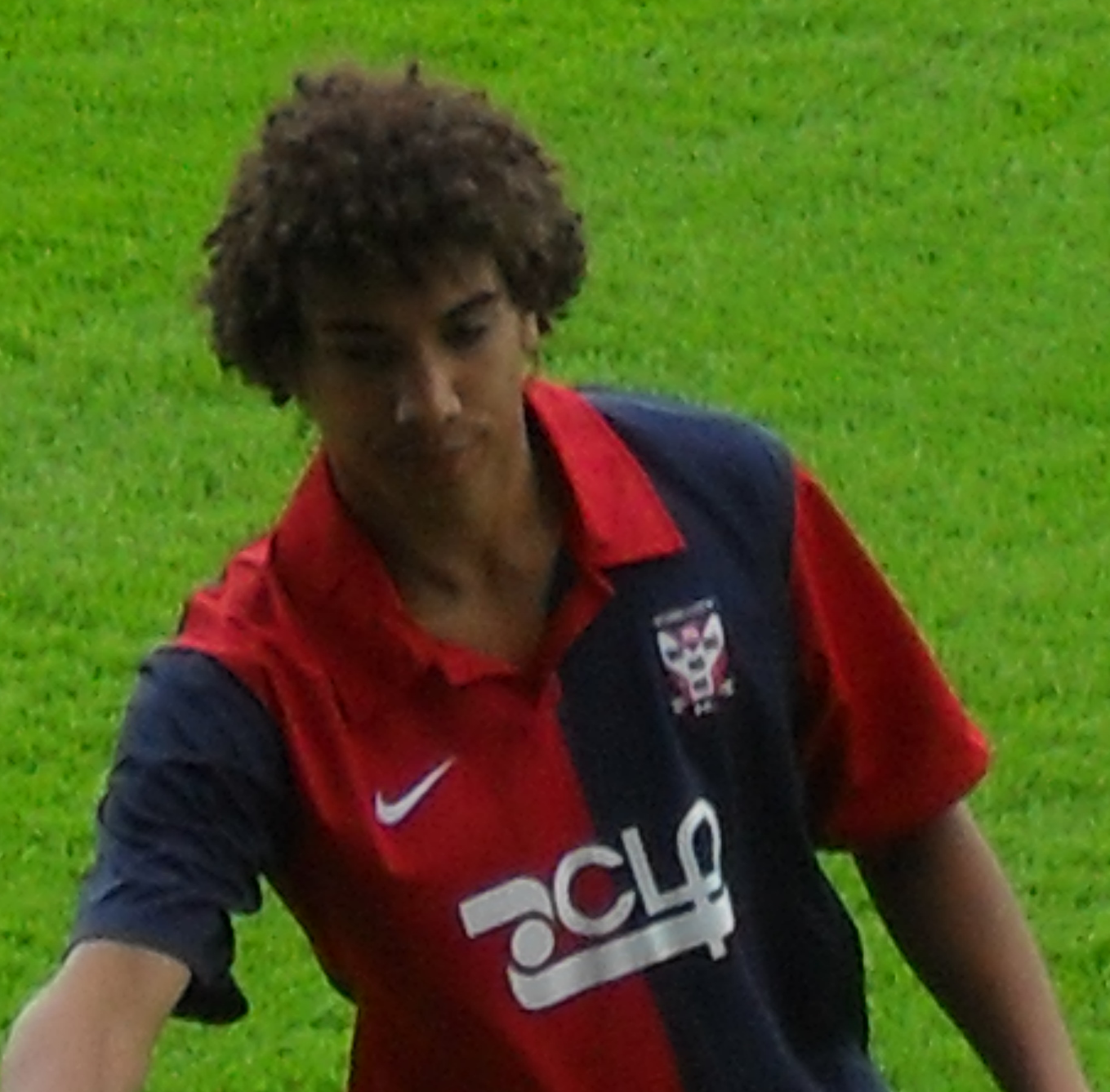
- Jackson playing for York City on trial in 2009

Personal information
- Full name: Jamie Noel Emmanuel Donnelly-Jackson
- Date of birth: 1 November 1986 (age 40)
- Place of birth: Sheffield, England
- Height: 5 ft 6 in (1.68 m)
- Position: Striker

Team information
- Current team: Grantham Town

Youth career
- 2003–2006: Chesterfield

Senior career*
Years	Team	Apps	(Gls)
2006–2008	Chesterfield	20	(0)
2007–2008	→ Matlock Town (loan)		
2008	→ Gainsborough Trinity (loan)	4	(0)
2008–2009	Matlock Town		
2009–2010	Sheffield		
2010–2012	Worksop Town		
2012–2013	Bradford Park Avenue		
2013	→ Worksop Town (loan)		
2013	Belper Town		
2013–2014	Grantham Town		
2014	Worksop Town		
2014–2015	FC Halifax Town	38	(4)
2015–2016	Alfreton Town		
2016–2017	Buxton		
2017–2019	Matlock Town		
2019–	Grantham Town		
- * Club domestic league appearances and goals as of 14:24, 5 December 2017 (UTC)

Jamie Noel Emmanuel Donnelly-Jackson (born 1 November 1986), known as Jamie Jackson, is an English semi-professional footballer who plays as a striker for Grantham Town.

== Career ==
=== Chesterfield ===
Born in Sheffield, South Yorkshire, Jackson started his career with Chesterfield after signing a three-year scholarship in 2003, before signing a two-year professional contract in April 2006. He made his first team debut after coming on as a 71st minute substitute in a 3–1 defeat to Port Vale on 29 April. He had loans with Matlock Town and Gainsborough Trinity, where he made four appearances during the 2007–08 season.

=== Matlock Town ===
He joined Matlock permanently in August 2008. He had a trial with Conference Premier team York City in July 2009 and played in the first half of a 3–3 draw with Leeds United in a pre-season friendly. He went on to score York's second goal in a 2–0 victory over Hartlepool United. He was told to leave Matlock by manager Mark Atkins in October, who criticised Jackson's attitude and conduct after having a trial with York while still being contracted by Matlock. He later had his contract cancelled by the club.

=== Worksop Town ===
In February 2010 he signed for Worksop Town, initially until the end of the season this was extended. Jamie also helped the club win their first trophy in 9 years scoring 2 goals at Hillsborough in the Sheffield Senior Cup final, as Worksop came twice from behind to beat rivals Frickley 3–2 in May 2012.

=== Bradford Park Avenue ===
In June 2012 Jackson joined Bradford Park Avenue. He joined Conference Premier club FC Halifax Town following a successful trial on 29 July 2014.

=== Buxton ===
In 2016, Jackson joined Buxton. At the end of the 2016–17 season, Jackson was released by Buxton.

He subsequently signed for Matlock Town.

== Personal life ==
Jackson is the half brother of former Bolton Wanderers and Preston North End striker Kevin Davies.
