= Charlie Comyn-Platt =

English footballer

Personal information
- Date of birth: 2 October 1985 (age 41)
- Place of birth: Withington, Manchester, England
- Positions: Defender; midfielder

Youth career
- 1994–1998: Wythenshawe Amateurs
- 1997–2002: Bolton Wanderers

Senior career*
Years	Team	Apps	(Gls)
2003–2005	Bolton Wanderers	4	(0)
2004	→ Wycombe Wanderers (loan)	5	(0)
2005–2007	Swindon Town	42	(2)
2006	→ Grays Athletic (loan)	5	(0)
2007	Rochdale	0	(0)
2007–2009	Weston-super-Mare	42	(5)
2009–2010	ECU Joondalup	46	(6)
2011	Cirencester Town	5	(0)
2012–2015	ECU Joondalup	61	(7)
Total		210	(20)
- * Club domestic league appearances and goals

Charlie Comyn-Platt (born 2 October 1985) is an English former professional footballer who played as a defender and midfielder.

Comyn-Platt attended Parrs Wood High School in East Didsbury along with fellow footballers Danny Webber, Carlos Roca and Lewis Montrose. He started his career at Bolton Wanderers under Sam Allardyce, and made his debut on 24 September 2003 as a late substitute in a 3–1 League Cup win over Walsall. Later in the 2003–04 season he started twice against Tranmere Rovers in the FA Cup. Comyn-Platt was in the match day squad for numerous Premier League games and also the 2004 League Cup Final, but in total, appeared for the Wanderers four times.

In the 2004–05 season he was loaned to Wycombe Wanderers for one month, playing five times for Tony Adams' side. He was released by Bolton Wanderers at the end of the season and signed by Andy King for Swindon Town along with fellow Bolton youngster Ricky Shakes.

Comyn-Platt did not play much under King, but after his dismissal he found himself a regular player in the team under Iffy Onuora. Though Swindon were relegated at the end of the 2005–06 season, Comyn-Platt signed a new one-year contract. In 2006–07, Comyn-Platt was a consistent member of the first team under Dennis Wise's reign, but then found himself out of favour under Paul Sturrock. In total, Comyn-Platt appeared 42 times for Swindon. On 23 November 2006 he joined Grays Athletic on loan until January 2007, playing five times in the league for the club.

On 31 January 2007, Comyn-Platt joined Rochdale just a few minutes before the transfer window closed at midnight. He signed an 18-month contract, but didn't play in his first half-season, and his contract was terminated by mutual consent in July 2007.

In November 2007 he signed for and captained Conference South side Weston-super-Mare. In early 2009 he moved to Australian club ECU Joondalup. In June 2011, he went on trial with A-League club Perth Glory and after failing to secure a deal with Perth he returned to England and spent time with Forest Green Rovers.

In October 2011, Comyn-Platt signed for Cirencester Town. He left the club shortly after however to return to Australia and play for ECU Joondalup. He returned to England in 2015 to pursue a career in coaching. He worked in Oldham Athletic's Academy and now works for Liverpool F.C. International Academy.

As of December 2023, Comyn-Platt lives in Liminka, Finland.
