= Nicky Hunt =

English footballer (born 1983)

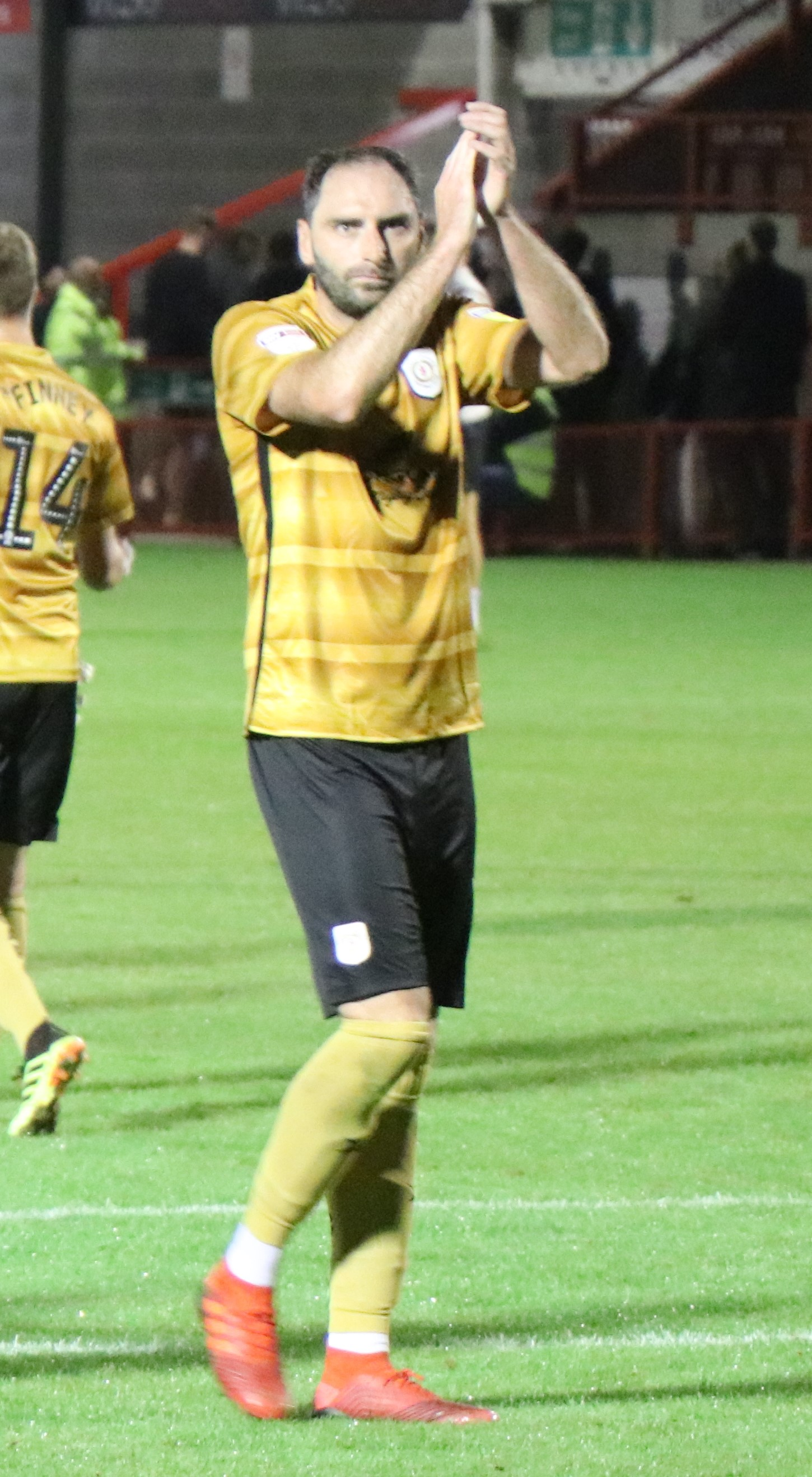
- Hunt celebrates Crewe win at Crawley Town, August 2019.

Personal information
- Full name: Nicholas Brett Hunt
- Date of birth: 3 September 1983 (age 43)
- Place of birth: Westhoughton, England
- Height: 6 ft 1 in (1.85 m)
- Positions: Right-back; centre-back

Team information
- Current team: Daisy Hill (manager)

Youth career
- –2001: Bolton Wanderers

Senior career*
Years	Team	Apps	(Gls)
2001–2010	Bolton Wanderers	128	(1)
2008	→ Birmingham City (loan)	11	(0)
2010	→ Derby County (loan)	21	(0)
2010–2012	Bristol City	7	(0)
2012	Preston North End	17	(1)
2012–2013	Rotherham United	9	(0)
2013	→ Accrington Stanley (loan)	11	(0)
2013–2015	Accrington Stanley	66	(0)
2015–2016	Mansfield Town	19	(0)
2016–2017	Leyton Orient	50	(1)
2017–2018	Notts County	13	(0)
2018–2020	Crewe Alexandra	47	(1)
2020–2021	Darlington	6	(0)
2021–2023	Ashton United	2	(0)
Total		407	(4)

International career
2004–2005	England U21	10	(0)

Managerial career
- 2025–: Daisy Hill
- * Club domestic league appearances and goals

Nicholas Brett Hunt (born 3 September 1983) is an English former footballer and manager of Daisy Hill. He is best known for his spell at Bolton Wanderers at the beginning of his career. Originally a right-back, he converted to centre-back in 2016 in order to extend his playing career.

He made 127 Premier League appearances for his boyhood club Bolton Wanderers and more than 250 in the Football League for a variety of clubs, and represented England at under-21 level.

== Club career ==
=== Bolton Wanderers ===
Hunt made his professional debut as a substitute for Colin Hendry in the First Division match against Sheffield United on the final day of the 2000–01 regular season, shortly before Bolton Wanderers won promotion to the Premier League via the play-offs. He had to wait some time for further first-team opportunities, only playing in two FA Cup ties (against Sunderland in January 2003) before making his breakthrough at the start of the 2003–04 season when he became a key part of the defence and a first-team regular for Bolton. His Premier League debut came in the 4–0 defeat at Manchester United on 16 August 2003. He made over a century of appearances for the club, scoring once, against Liverpool in February 2004. His form earned him a four-year contract at Bolton, taking him until the end of the 2010–11 season, which he signed on 30 August 2007.

=== Birmingham City loan ===
The departure of Sam Allardyce to Newcastle United and his eventual replacement by Gary Megson saw Hunt fall out of favour at the Reebok Stadium and he joined Championship club Birmingham City on an emergency one-month loan deal as cover for the injured Stuart Parnaby and Stephen Kelly on 3 November 2008. He made his debut the same day, in a 1–0 defeat to Coventry City at St Andrew's. The loan was extended for a further month, but on 30 December, a 24-hour recall clause in the loan agreement was invoked and the player returned to Bolton.

=== Derby County loan ===
Despite being recalled Hunt played no further role for Bolton in the ensuing year and was again loaned out to a Championship club, this time Derby County, on 7 January 2010 as competition for the club's sole available rightback, Paul Connolly. Initially a month's loan, it was extended until the end of the season.

=== Bristol City ===
On 30 July 2010, Hunt signed a two-year deal with Championship club Bristol City. He made his debut in a 3–0 loss to Millwall. Hunt made seven appearances in the first two months of the season, and an eighth in a 3–1 loss against Leeds United on 13 November, but that was his last for the club. Under Steve Coppell, Hunt was put in the first team which gave Hunt his debut for the club until Coppell's unexpected resignation over his lack of passion for the job. Under Coppell's assistant manager Keith Millen, Hunt was given more playing time until Hunt fell out favour with Millen. Things came to a head when Hunt replaced an injured Louis Carey in a game against Leeds. At the time City were drawing 1–1 in a hard-fought game but went on to lose 3–1. Millen favoured Carey and Jordan Spence at right back until he was sacked. At the start of the 2011–12 season, Millen was keen to offload him but received no offers for the player. On 31 January 2012, Hunt's contract was terminated.

=== Preston North End ===
A few days later, Hunt signed a short-term deal with Preston North End. He played regularly over the next few months, and was released when his contract expired.

=== Rotherham United ===
Hunt signed for Rotherham United on 22 May 2012. A hamstring tear during a pre-season friendly delayed his competitive debut, he played just a few matches before falling out of favour, and he joined Accrington Stanley on loan in January 2013.

=== Accrington Stanley ===
On his third appearance, Hunt collided with Plymouth Argyle's Ronan Murray, lost consciousness, and was taken to hospital after ten minutes of treatment on the pitch. Once his recovery was well on the way, the loan was extended to the end of the season.

He signed for Stanley on a two-year deal in June 2013 after Rotherham released him from his contract.

Hunt chose to leave Stanley at the end of his contract.

=== Mansfield Town ===
In June 2015 he signed for Mansfield Town.

=== Leyton Orient ===
In the January 2016 transfer window, Hunt joined Leyton Orient until the end of the season with an option for a further year. He scored his first goal for Orient in a 3–0 win at Colchester United on 12 November 2016.

=== Notts County ===
On 1 August 2017, Hunt signed for Notts County. He was released at the end of the season.

=== Crewe Alexandra ===
On 31 July 2018, Hunt joined Crewe Alexandra on a one-year deal after a successful trial. He made his first-team debut on 4 August as a 29th-minute substitute for George Ray in a 6–0 win over Morecambe. He signed a new one-year deal in May 2019. On 12 October 2019, he scored his first and ultimately only Crewe goal in a 4–2 win at Carlisle United. He was released at the end of the season.

=== Darlington ===
Hunt joined Darlington in July 2020. On 10 November, in a match against Boston United, Hunt lost consciousness following a collision with another player and received treatment on the pitch for more than an hour before being taken to hospital; the match was abandoned. After scans on his head and neck, Hunt was released from the hospital the following morning. He was able to return to action at the end of the month, finishing the truncated season with 16 appearances in all competitions, and was released when his contract expired.

== International career ==
Hunt won ten England U21 caps, the first in February 2004 against the Netherlands.

== Coaching career ==
In June 2021, Hunt joined Northern Premier League Premier Division club Ashton United as first-team coach working under manager Michael Clegg, and would register as a player "on a bit-part basis if needed".

On 14 February 2023, Hunt joined Warrington Rylands 1906 as a coach.

Ahead of the 2025–26 season, Hunt once again linked up with Clegg, joining Atherton Collieries as assistant manager.

On 3 September 2025, Hunt was appointed manager of North West Counties League Division One North club Daisy Hill.

== Career statistics ==
Appearances and goals by club, season and competition
Club	Season	League			FA Cup		League Cup		Other		Total	
Club	Season	Division	Apps	Goals	Apps	Goals	Apps	Goals	Apps	Goals	Apps	Goals
Bolton Wanderers	2000–01	First Division	1	0	0	0	0	0	0	0	1	0
Bolton Wanderers	2001–02	Premier League	0	0	0	0	0	0	—		0	0
Bolton Wanderers	2002–03	Premier League	0	0	2	0	0	0	—		2	0
Bolton Wanderers	2003–04	Premier League	31	1	1	0	6	0	—		38	1
Bolton Wanderers	2004–05	Premier League	29	0	4	0	1	0	—		34	0
Bolton Wanderers	2005–06	Premier League	20	0	2	0	1	0	2 (Note: Appearances in UEFA Cup)	0	25	0
Bolton Wanderers	2006–07	Premier League	33	0	2	0	2	0	—		37	0
Bolton Wanderers	2007–08	Premier League	14	0	1	0	1	0	8	0	24	0
Bolton Wanderers	2008–09	Premier League	0	0	0	0	0	0	—		0	0
Bolton Wanderers	2009–10	Premier League	0	0	0	0	0	0	—		0	0
Bolton Wanderers	Total		128	1	12	0	11	0	10	0	161	1
Birmingham City (loan)	2008–09	Championship	11	0	—		—		—		11	0
Derby County (loan)	2009–10	Championship	21	0	2	0	—		—		23	0
Bristol City	2010–11	Championship	7	0	0	0	1	0	—		8	0
Preston North End	2011–12	League One	17	1	—		—		—		17	1
Rotherham United	2012–13	League Two	9	0	0	0	0	0	0	0	9	0
Accrington Stanley (loan)	2012–13	League Two	11	0	—		—		—		11	0
Accrington Stanley	2013–14	League Two	37	0	1	0	1	0	0	0	39	0
Accrington Stanley	2014–15	League Two	29	0	0	0	1	0	0	0	30	0
Accrington Stanley	Total		77	0	1	0	2	0	0	0	80	0
Mansfield Town	2015–16	League Two	19	0	1	0	1	0	0	0	21	0
Leyton Orient	2015–16	League Two	16	0	—		—		—		16	0
Leyton Orient	2016–17	League Two	34	1	1	0	1	0	2 (Note: Appearances in EFL Trophy)	0	38	1
Leyton Orient	Total		50	1	1	0	1	0	2	0	54	1
Notts County	2017–18	League Two	13	0	2	0	1	0	3	0	19	0
Crewe Alexandra	2018–19	League Two	22	0	1	0	1	0	1	0	25	0
Crewe Alexandra	2019–20	League Two	25	1	3	0	0	0	1	0	29	1
Crewe Alexandra	Total		47	1	4	0	1	0	2	0	54	1
Darlington	2020–21	National League North	6	0	5	0	—		5 (Note: Appearance in FA Trophy)	0	16	0
Ashton United	2021–22	NPL Premier Division	2	0	0	0	—		0	0	2	0
Ashton United	2022–23	NPL Premier Division	0	0	0	0	—		0	0	0	0
Ashton United	Total		2	0	0	0	0	0	0	0	2	
Career total			407	4	28	0	18	0	22	0	475	4

== Honours ==
Bolton Wanderers

- Football League Cup runner-up: 2003–04
