= Ricky Shakes =

Guyanese footballer

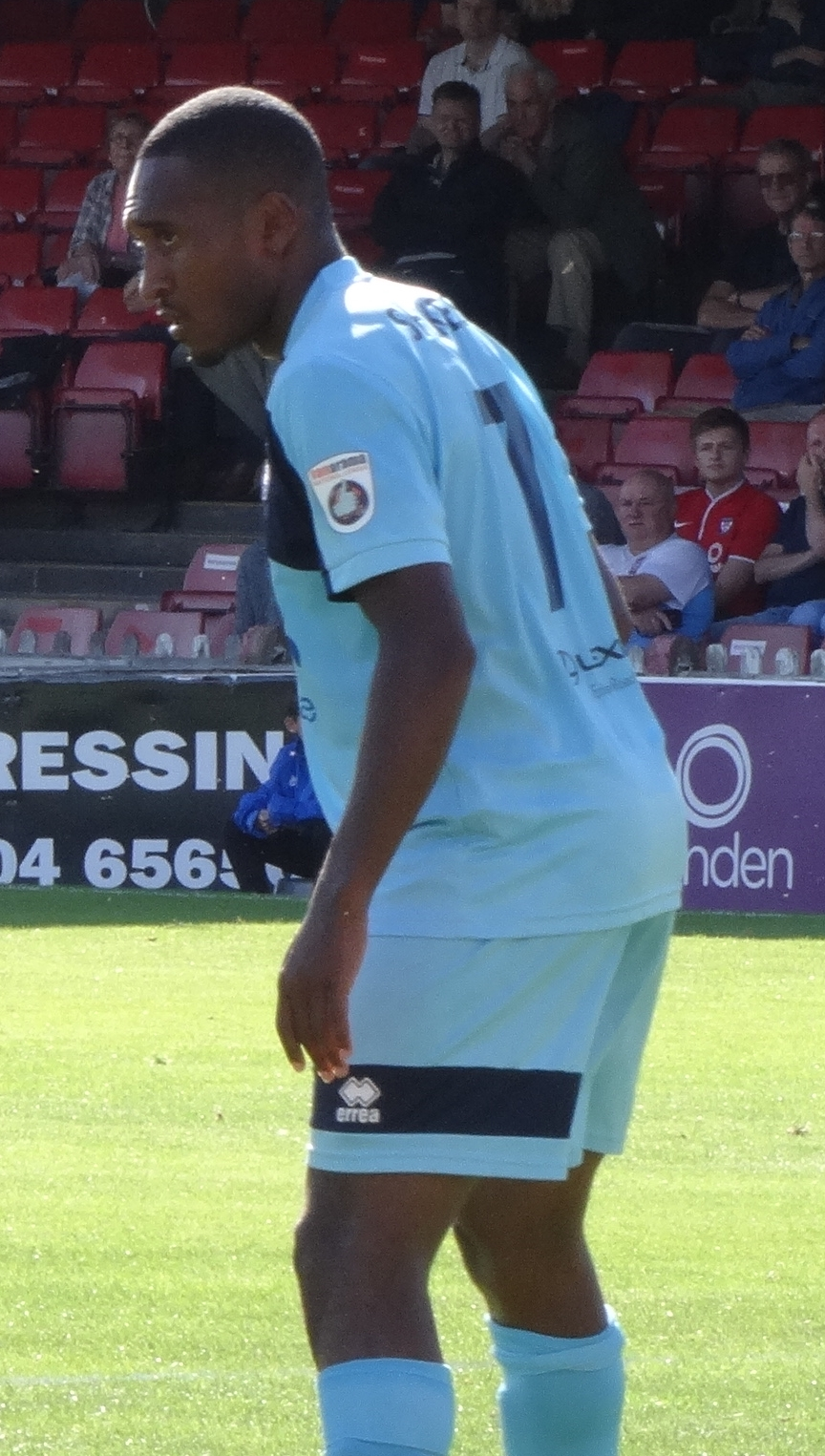
- Shakes playing for Boreham Wood in 2016

Personal information
- Full name: Ricky Ulric Bascombe Shakes
- Date of birth: 25 January 1985 (age 41)
- Place of birth: Brixton, England
- Height: 1.78 m (5 ft 10 in)
- Position: Winger

Senior career*
Years	Team	Apps	(Gls)
2004–2005	Bolton Wanderers	0	(0)
2005	→ Bristol Rovers (loan)	1	(0)
2005	→ Bury (loan)	7	(2)
2005–2007	Swindon Town	69	(5)
2007–2008	Brentford	39	(3)
2008–2012	Ebbsfleet United	151	(21)
2012–2013	Kidderminster Harriers	17	(0)
2013–2021	Boreham Wood	229	(24)
2021	St Albans City	4	(0)

International career
2006	Trinidad and Tobago	1	(0)
2011–2016	Guyana	14	(5)
- * Club domestic league appearances and goals

Ricky Ulric Bascombe Shakes (born 25 January 1985) is a retired professional footballer who played as a winger. He has played in the Football League for Bristol Rovers, Bury, Swindon Town and Brentford. Born in England, Shakes represented the Trinidad and Tobago national football team once in a friendly, and thereafter has represented Guyana internationally.

== Club career ==
Born in Brixton, Greater London, Shakes began his career at Bolton Wanderers in 2004, and made his debut in an FA Cup third-round replay against Tranmere Rovers in January 2004, scoring a last-minute equaliser to take the match into extra time. He failed to make a league appearance for Bolton, and after spells on loan with Bristol Rovers and Bury, joined Swindon Town in July 2005. Shakes made almost 70 league appearances in two seasons at Swindon but was released at the end of the 2006–07 season.

He joined Brentford in August 2007 after training with the club during the summer and scored a late goal on his debut in September 2007 to give Brentford victory away to Bury. However, after making 39 league appearances, he was released at the end of the 2007–08 season.

He joined Conference Premier club Ebbsfleet United in July 2008. In August 2010, it was reported that he was on trial with League Two club Stockport County, before re-signing for Ebbsfleet a few weeks into the season.

Having scored 11 goals in 46 matches for Ebbsfleet in the 2010–11 season, he added to that statistic by scoring eight goals in 45 appearances for the club during the 2011–12 season. On 29 June 2012, Shakes signed for Kidderminster Harriers. Shakes made 18 appearances for Kidderminster in the 2012–13 season, helping the club finish second in the Conference Premier.

On 3 July 2013, Shakes signed for Conference South club Boreham Wood. Shakes suffered a serious knee injury in pre-season training and was expected to be out for six months.

On 7 January 2021, Shakes signed for National League South side St Albans City. On 6 April 2021, Shakes announced his retirement.

== International career ==
Shakes made his international debut in March 2006, coming on as a half-time substitute for Trinidad and Tobago in a 2–0 victory against Iceland.

In October 2011, Shakes was called up to Guyana for their 2014 FIFA World Cup qualifiers against Barbados and Bermuda. Originally, Shakes failed to meet FIFA's age regulations for changing international allegiance, however, Guyana won an appeal in 2010 which allowed him to do so. He made his debut for Guyana in a 2–0 away win against Barbados on 7 October 2011, before scoring his first goal four days later in a 1–1 draw with Bermuda.

Shakes' third international appearance came in the 2–1 victory over Trinidad & Tobago on 11 November 2011 which sealed Guyana's qualification to the third round of the 2014 FIFA World Cup qualifiers. In that game, Shakes scored the first goal and created the second for Burnley's Leon Cort, before Kenwyne Jones' consolation for Trinidad & Tobago.

Shakes was eligible to play for Trinidad and Tobago through his mother's heritage, and Guyana through his father's birth.

== Career statistics ==
=== Club ===
As of match played 16 February 2021

Appearances and goals by club, season and competition
Club	Season	League			FA Cup		League Cup		Other		Total	
Club	Season	Division	Apps	Goals	Apps	Goals	Apps	Goals	Apps	Goals	Apps	Goals
Bolton Wanderers	2003–04	Premier League	0	0	1	1	0	0	—		1	1
Bolton Wanderers	2004–05	Premier League	0	0	0	0	1	0	—		1	0
Bolton Wanderers	Total		0	0	1	1	1	0	—		2	1
Bristol Rovers (loan)	2004–05	League Two	1	0	—		—		1 (Note: Appearance in Football League Trophy)	0	2	0
Bury (loan)	2004–05	League Two	7	2	—		—		—		7	2
Swindon Town	2005–06	League One	37	3	2	0	1	0	0	0	40	3
Swindon Town	2006–07	League Two	32	2	3	0	1	0	1	0	37	2
Swindon Town	Total		69	5	5	0	2	0	1	0	77	5
Brentford	2007–08	League Two	39	3	2	0	0	0	1	1	42	4
Ebbsfleet United	2008–09	Conference Premier	34	4	2	0	—		11 (Note: Four appearances in Conference League Cup, seven in FA Trophy)	0	47	4
Ebbsfleet United	2009–10	Conference Premier	42	4	1	0	—		1 (Note: Appearance(s) in FA Trophy)	0	44	4
Ebbsfleet United	2010–11	Conference South	34	6	6	2	—		6 (Note: Three appearances in FA Trophy, three appearances and three goals in Conference South play-offs)	3	46	11
Ebbsfleet United	2011–12	Conference Premier	41	7	1	0	—		3	1	45	8
Ebbsfleet United	Total		151	21	10	2	—		21	4	182	27
Kidderminster Harriers	2012–13	Conference Premier	17	0	0	0	—		1	0	18	0
Boreham Wood	2013–14	Conference South	8	1	0	0	—		0	0	8	1
Boreham Wood	2014–15	Conference South	40	9	4	1	—		4 (Note: One appearance in FA Trophy, three appearances and one goal in Conference South play-offs)	1	48	11
Boreham Wood	2015–16	National League	45	2	2	0	—		1	0	48	2
Boreham Wood	2016–17	National League	29	7	0	0	—		5	0	34	7
Boreham Wood	2017–18	National League	42	3	2	0	—		7 (Note: Four appearances and one goal in FA Trophy, three appearances in National League play-offs)	1	51	4
Boreham Wood	2018–19	National League	46	2	3	0	—		3 (Note: One appearance in Scottish Challenge Cup, two in FA Trophy)	0	52	2
Boreham Wood	2019–20	National League	16	0	0	0	—		0	0	16	0
Boreham Wood	Total		226	24	11	2	—		20	2	257	28
St Albans City	2020–21	National League South	4	0	—		—		—		4	0
Career total			514	55	29	3	3	0	45	7	591	65

=== International ===
As of match played 4 June 2016

Appearances and goals by national team and year
National team	Year	Apps	Goals
Trinidad and Tobago	2006	1	0
Total		1	0
Guyana	2011	3	2
Guyana	2012	7	0
Guyana	2015	2	1
Guyana	2016	2	2
Total		14	5

=== International goals ===
As of match played 4 June 2016. Guyana score listed first, score column indicates score after each Shakes goal.

International goals by date, venue, cap, opponent, score, result and competition
No.	Date	Venue	Cap	Opponent	Score	Result	Competition
1	11 October 2011	Bermuda National Stadium, Devonshire Parish, Bermuda	2	Bermuda	1–1	1–1	2014 FIFA World Cup qualification
2	11 November 2011	Providence Stadium, Providence, Guyana	3	Trinidad and Tobago	1–0	2–1	2014 FIFA World Cup qualification
3	10 June 2015	Arnos Vale Stadium, Kingstown, Saint Vincent and the Grenadines	11	Saint Vincent and the Grenadines	2–1	2–2	2018 FIFA World Cup qualification
4	4 June 2016	Addelita Cancryn Junior High School Ground, Charlotte Amalie, United States Virgin Islands	14	U.S. Virgin Islands	2–0	7–0	2017 Caribbean Cup qualification
5	4 June 2016	Addelita Cancryn Junior High School Ground, Charlotte Amalie, United States Virgin Islands	14	U.S. Virgin Islands	4–0	7–0	2017 Caribbean Cup qualification

== Honours ==
Swindon Town

- Football League Two third-place promotion: 2006–07

Ebbsfleet United

- Conference South play-offs: 2011

Boreham Wood

- Conference South play-offs: 2015
