= Henrik Pedersen (footballer) =

Danish footballer (born 1975)

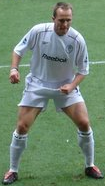

Personal information
- Full name: Henrik Pedersen
- Date of birth: 10 June 1975 (age 51)
- Place of birth: Kjellerup, Denmark
- Height: 1.86 m (6 ft 1 in)
- Position: Striker

Senior career*
Years	Team	Apps	(Gls)
1995–2001	Silkeborg IF	122	(62)
2001–2007	Bolton Wanderers	143	(22)
2002	→ Silkeborg IF (loan)	5	(1)
2007–2008	Hull City	21	(4)
2008–2012	Silkeborg IF	107	(20)
Total		398	(109)

International career
2000–2004	Denmark	3	(0)
- * Club domestic league appearances and goals

Henrik Pedersen (born 10 June 1975) is a Danish retired footballer who played as a striker for Silkeborg IF, Bolton Wanderers and Hull City. He played three games for the Danish national team.

He has the Silkeborg IF club goalscoring record with 96, together with Heine Fernandez.

== Career ==
=== Silkeborg ===
Born in Kjellerup, Denmark, Pedersen started his career with Danish club Silkeborg IF in 1995. He made his debut for the Danish national team in an August 2000 game against the Faroe Islands. He finished the second highest scoring player of the 2000–01 Superliga season and helped Silkeborg win the 2001 Danish Cup trophy.

=== Bolton Wanderers ===
Pedersen signed for Bolton Wanderers on 3 July 2001 for £650,000, both Borussia Dortmund and Stuttgart had expressed interest in taking Pedersen to the Bundesliga that summer as well. He made his debut on 18 August 2001 in Bolton's opening day 5–0 win against Leicester City, coming on as a second-half substitute for Ricardo Gardner. Pedersen scored his first goal for the club on 11 September 2001 in the League Cup second round tie against Walsall, he came on as a second-half substitute for Gareth Farrelly before scoring an extra-time winning goal to seal a 4–3 victory for The Wanderers.

Struggling with his performances in the English Premier League, he went on loan back to Silkeborg IF, to aid their fight against relegation in the last part of the 2001–02 season. He returned to Bolton for the 2002–03 season and became an important part of the Bolton squad. At the start of the 2005–06 season he showed his versatility by playing at left-back in an emergency. He is known for his "peacock" goal celebration, a treat he developed with fellow Danish player Martin Retov.

=== Hull City ===
He left Bolton Wanderers in May 2007 and signed for Hull City on 13 August 2007. In an injury-hit season, he mainly played on the left of midfield when fit, and also deputised at left-back.

In July 2008, Pedersen left Hull City, citing family reasons.

=== Return to Silkeborg ===
Having left Hull City Pedersen re-signed for his third stint at Silkeborg.

== Personal life ==
In Denmark he is known by his nickname, "Tømrer", which means "Carpenter".

Pedersen is now retired and lives in Silkeborg where he owns the sports pub Målet (English: The Goal).

== Honours ==
Silkeborg

- UEFA Intertoto Cup: 1996
- Danish Cup: 2000–01

Bolton Wanderers

- Football League Cup runner-up: 2003–04
