= Bolton Wanderers F.C. Player of the Year =

English football club award

The Bolton Wanderers F.C. Player of the Year is an award presented to the Bolton Wanderers fans' player of the season.

The first winner of the award was Simon Charlton in 2002. Since then, fourteen more players have won the award with one player, Kevin Davies, winning the award three times and another, Tim Ream, winning it twice. Davies was the only player to retain the trophy, winning it in 2008 and 2009 until Ream retained it himself in 2014 and 2015.

Voting takes place towards the end of each season, usually in April, and is open to anyone. Fans can click on a link on the Bolton Wanderers website.

== Winners ==
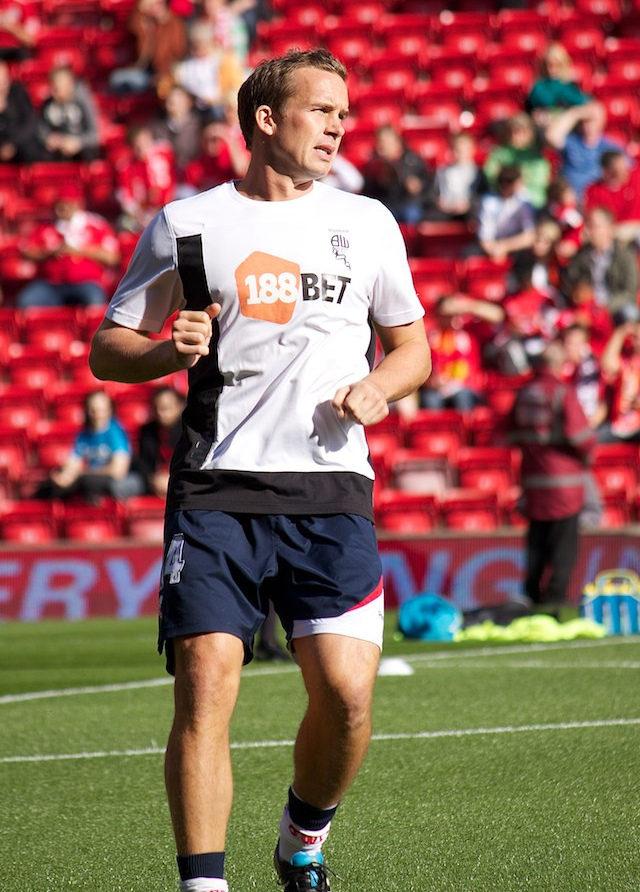
Kevin Davies is the only player to win the award three times

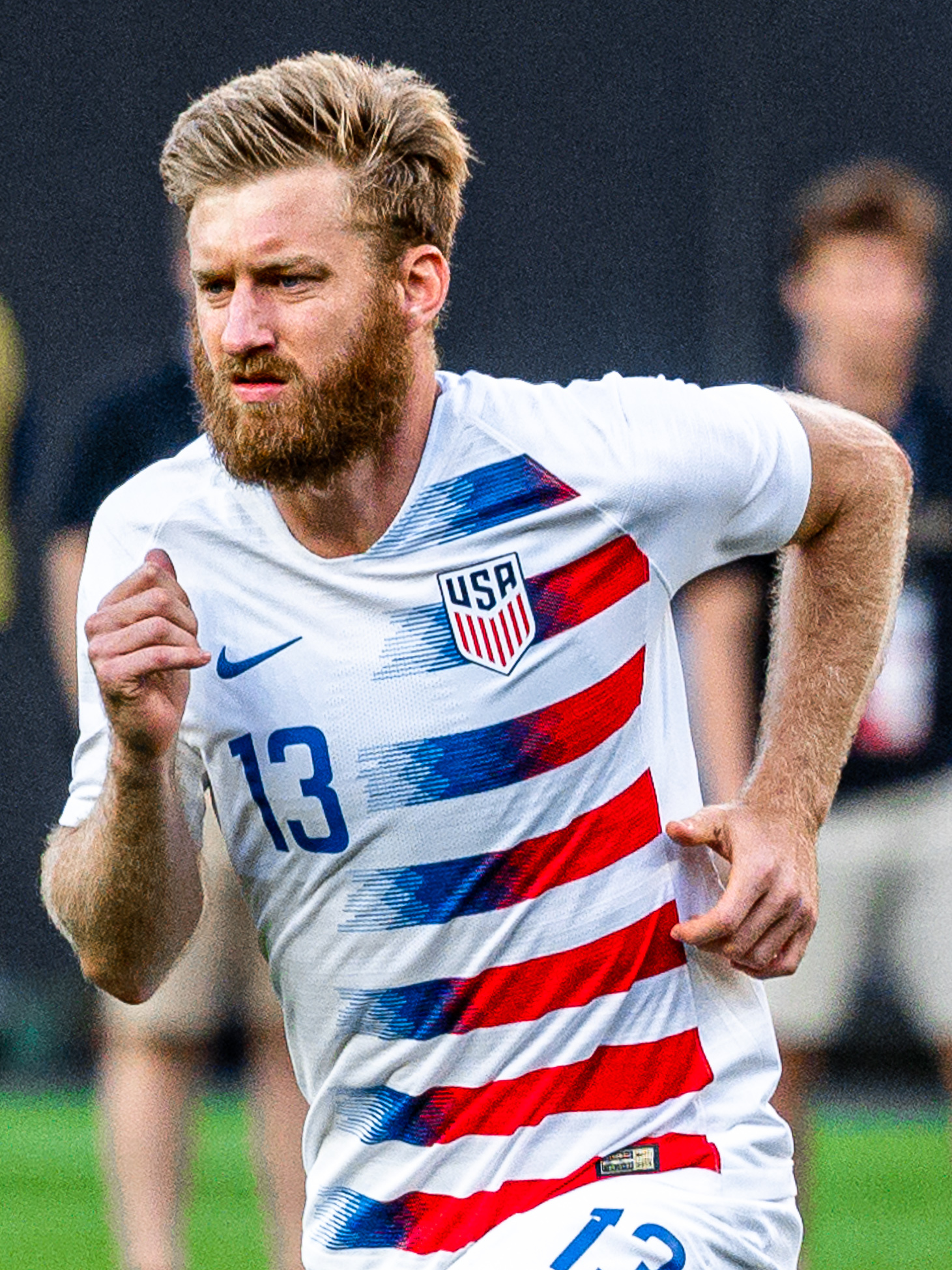
Tim Ream is one of only two players to retain the award

Players in bold are still playing for Bolton Wanderers.

Season	Name	Nationality	Position	Notes	Ref(s)
2001–02	Simon Charlton	England	Defender		
2002–03	Jay-Jay Okocha	Nigeria	Midfielder	First winner from outside England	
2003–04	Kevin Davies	England	Forward		
2004–05	Bruno Ngotty	France	Defender	First winner from mainland Europe	
2005–06	Ricardo Gardner	Jamaica	Midfielder	First winner from CONCACAF	
2006–07	Jussi Jääskeläinen	Finland	Goalkeeper		
2007–08	Kevin Davies	England	Forward	First player to win the award twice	
2008–09	Kevin Davies	England	Forward	First player to retain the award	
2009–10	Lee Chung-yong	South Korea	Midfielder	First winner from Asia	
2010–11	Stuart Holden	United States	Midfielder	First winner from North America	
2011–12	Ádám Bogdán	Hungary	Goalkeeper		
2012–13	Jay Spearing	England	Midfielder	First on loan player to win award	
2013–14	Tim Ream	United States	Defender		
2014–15	Tim Ream	United States	Defender		
2015–16	Rob Holding	England	Defender	First player to come through the youth team to win award	
2016–17	David Wheater	England	Defender		
2017–18	Ben Alnwick	England	Goalkeeper		
2018–19	Gary O'Neil	England	Midfielder		
2019–20	N/A	N/A	N/A	Season ended early because of the COVID-19 pandemic	
2020–21	Ricardo Santos	Portugal	Defender		
2021–22	Oladapo Afolayan	England	Midfielder		
2022–23	Conor Bradley	Northern Ireland	Defender		
2023–24	**Josh Sheehan**	Wales	Midfielder		
2024–25	Aaron Collins	Wales	Forward		
2025–26	**Sam Dalby**	England	Forward		

=== Wins by player ===
Winner	Total wins	Year(s)
(England) Kevin Davies	3	2004, 2008, 2009
(United States) Tim Ream	2	2014, 2015
(England) Simon Charlton	1	2002
(Nigeria) Jay-Jay Okocha	1	2003
(France) Bruno Ngotty	1	2005
(Jamaica) Ricardo Gardner	1	2006
(Finland) Jussi Jääskeläinen	1	2007
(South Korea) Lee Chung-yong	1	2010
(United States) Stuart Holden	1	2011
(Hungary) Ádám Bogdán	1	2012
(England) Jay Spearing	1	2013
(England) Rob Holding	1	2016
(England) David Wheater	1	2017
(England) Ben Alnwick	1	2018
(England) Gary O'Neil	1	2019
(Portugal) Ricardo Santos	1	2021
(England) Oladapo Afolayan	1	2022
(Northern Ireland) Conor Bradley	1	2023
(Wales) Josh Sheehan	1	2024
(Wales) Aaron Collins	1	2025
(England) Sam Dalby	1	2026

=== Wins by playing position ===
Position	Number of wins
Goalkeeper	3
Defender	8
Midfielder	8
Forward	5

=== Wins by nationality ===
Nationality	Number of winners
England	11
United States	3
Wales	2
Nigeria	1
France	1
Jamaica	1
Finland	1
South Korea	1
Hungary	1
Portugal	1
Northern Ireland	1
