= Ricardo Gardner =

Jamaican footballer (born 1978)

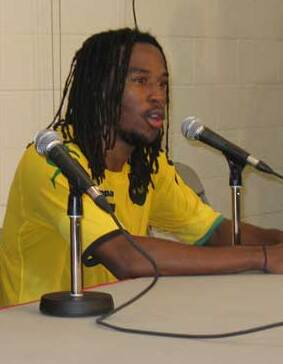
- Gardner in 2008

Personal information
- Full name: Ricardo Wayne Gardner
- Date of birth: 25 September 1978 (age 48)
- Place of birth: Saint Andrew Parish, Jamaica
- Height: 1.75 m (5 ft 9 in)
- Positions: Left winger; left wing-back

Youth career
- 1992–1997: Harbour View

Senior career*
Years	Team	Apps	(Gls)
1997–1998	Harbour View	10	(2)
1998–2012	Bolton Wanderers	342	(20)
2011	→ Preston North End (loan)	4	(0)
Total		356	(22)

International career
1997–2012	Jamaica	111	(9)

Managerial career
- 2015–2016: Jamaica U-20
- 2015–2018: Harbour View
- 2020–2021: Portmore United
- * Club domestic league appearances and goals

Ricardo Wayne Gardner (born 25 September 1978) is a Jamaican former professional footballer. He works as assistant coach at Portmore United. A left winger, he could also play in the centre of midfield or at left wing-back. He last played for Bolton Wanderers in May 2012, completing a 14-year spell at the club, of which 11 were spent in the Premier League. Gardner earned 111 caps for the Jamaica national football team, scoring 9 goals and playing at four CONCACAF Gold Cups and the 1998 FIFA World Cup.

== Playing career ==
=== Club career ===
==== Early career ====
Born in Saint Andrew, Jamaica, Gardner began his professional career with Harbour View, where he debuted as a starter at the age of only 14 years. He also, representing Wolmer's Boys' High School, dominated the local high school football leagues and was considered outstanding. His performances for Jamaica during the 1998 World Cup attracted English First Division side Bolton Wanderers to offer Harbour View £1 million for his services.

==== Bolton Wanderers ====
Gardner immediately established himself a place in the first team for Bolton. He came on as a substitute to make his debut against Hartlepool in the League Cup on 25 August 1998, and made his league debut as a substitute again against West Bromwich Albion on 8 September 1998. In this game, Bolton were reduced to 10 men after the sending off of Guðni Bergsson shortly after Gardner came on, but he scored a late winner to give his team a memorable 3–2 victory over West Brom. He made 22 appearances, half of them starts, in his first year while scoring three goals. In his second season, 1999–2000, he established a place in the starting eleven, starting 23 of 26 games, that he has held on to since. Although Gardner suffered a cruciate ligament injury that took him out of action at the end of the season, he made a full recovery, and was able to return to the starting line-up in 2000–01 (scoring in the 2001 Division One Play off Final), playing with the promoted Bolton in the Premier League. He was voted Bolton Wanderers F.C. Player of the Year for the 2005–06 season by the club's fans. Due to a knee injury, Gardner did not make his first appearance in the 2006–07 season until December.

In November 2007, he scored his first goal at club level in nearly five years when he opened the scoring in Bolton's 2–2 draw against German giants Bayern Munich at the Allianz Arena in the UEFA Cup group stage. A year later after being moved from a wing-back role back into midfield he scored in the Wanderers 2–0 win over local rivals Manchester City.

Gardner made his 400th appearance for Bolton in a 3–0 defeat to Fulham on 27 April 2011. On 24 May 2011, he was in discussions to extend his Bolton contract into a fourteenth year. Gardner rejected a move to West Ham United favouring to sign a new one-year contract at Bolton, which he signed on 5 August. He made four league appearances at the beginning of the next season but was sent off for two bookable offences in Bolton's 3–1 defeat at Swansea City on 29 October and then suffered an injury, making no further appearances that year.

At the close of the January 2012 transfer window, he wasn't named in Bolton's twenty five man Premier League squad for the second half of the season meaning he would play no further part in the league campaign. It was later revealed that he had been omitted due to having had an operation on his knee that the Bolton medical staff could not guarantee he would recover from in time to play again that season. It was announced on 18 May 2012 that Ricardo had left the club in line with the expiration of his contract. At the time, Gardner was the second longest serving foreign player in Premier League history after serving fourteen years at Bolton, only beaten by his former Bolton teammate Jussi Jääskeläinen.

==== Preston North End (loan) ====
On 8 March 2011, Gardner went to Preston North End on an emergency one-month loan as cover for Phil Brown's side. Bolton manager Owen Coyle said it was a great chance for Gardner to improve his match fitness after only just recovering from injury.

He made his debut the following day at the left-back position in the 2–1 loss to Leeds United and played three more games for the club.

==== Retirement ====
After the end of his contract with Bolton Wanderers, he spent a year training at his old club, West Ham United and Barnsley to keep up his fitness, and played in two reserve team matches for West Ham but decided to leave England to seek a move to the MLS. He went on an unsuccessful trial at Real Salt Lake where he played for the reserves in a 1–0 win against the Portland Timbers reserves and announced his official retirement in May 2014.

=== International career ===
Gardner rose to international prominence following the 1998 World Cup. Gardner was an important player for the Jamaican national team and earned his place as the team's captain, captaining the team between 2005 and 2009. He also captained the team for one game in 2012 at the 2012 Caribbean Cup.

== Coaching career ==
In December 2015, Gardner was appointed as coach of the Jamaica U-20 team. Gardner resigned as Harbour View FC Head coach in December 2018. In March 2019, Gardner joined the staff of Portmore United as assistant coach. In 2021, Gardner left his role as head of Portmore United to move back to England.

== Personal life ==
Gardner is a Rastafarian and sports dreadlocks. He is part owner, with Robert Scarlett and Ian Goodison, of a record label, Heart of Love Production, which promotes ragga and dancehall music. His son Che Gardner is also a professional footballer.

== Career statistics ==
=== Club ===
Appearances and goals by club, season and competition
Club	Season	League			FA Cup		League Cup		Europe		Other		Total	
Club	Season	Division	Apps	Goals	Apps	Goals	Apps	Goals	Apps	Goals	Apps	Goals	Apps	Goals
Bolton Wanderers	1998–99	First Division	30	2	1	0	3	1	–		3	0	37	3
Bolton Wanderers	1999–2000	First Division	29	5	4	0	9	1	–		–		42	6
Bolton Wanderers	2000–01	First Division	32	3	2	0	–		–		3	2	37	5
Bolton Wanderers	2001–02	Premier League	31	3	2	0	1	0	–		–		34	3
Bolton Wanderers	2002–03	Premier League	32	2	–		–		–		–		32	2
Bolton Wanderers	2003–04	Premier League	22	0	–		4	0	–		–		26	0
Bolton Wanderers	2004–05	Premier League	33	0	4	0	1	0	–		–		38	0
Bolton Wanderers	2005–06	Premier League	30	0	4	0	3	0	7	0	–		44	0
Bolton Wanderers	2006–07	Premier League	18	0	3	0	–		–		–		21	0
Bolton Wanderers	2007–08	Premier League	26	0	–		–		4	1	–		30	1
Bolton Wanderers	2008–09	Premier League	29	4	1	0	1	0	–		–		31	4
Bolton Wanderers	2009–10	Premier League	21	1	3	0	2	0	–		–		26	1
Bolton Wanderers	2010–11	Premier League	5	0	0	0	1	0	–		–		6	0
Bolton Wanderers	2011–12	Premier League	4	0	0	0	2	0	–		–		6	0
Bolton Wanderers	Total		342	20	24	0	27	2	11	1	6	2	410	25
Preston North End (loan)	2010–11	Championship	4	0	0	0	0	0	–		–		4	0
Career total			346	20	24	0	27	2	11	1	6	2	414	25

=== International ===
Appearances and goals by national team and year
National team	Year	Apps	Goals
Jamaica	1997	24	3
Jamaica	1998	19	0
Jamaica	1999	9	0
Jamaica	2000	5	0
Jamaica	2001	11	2
Jamaica	2002	1	0
Jamaica	2003	10	0
Jamaica	2004	9	0
Jamaica	2005	1	0
Jamaica	2007	4	2
Jamaica	2008	12	2
Jamaica	2009	3	0
Jamaica	2012	3	0
Total		111	9

Scores and results list Jamaica's goal tally first, score column indicates score after each Gardner goal.

List of international goals scored by Ricardo Gardner
No.	Date	Venue	Opponent	Score	Result	Competition	Ref.
1	13 July 1997	Antigua Recreation Ground, St. John's, Antigua and Barbuda	Grenada	2–0	4–1	1997 Caribbean Cup	
2	6 August 1997	National Stadium, Kingston, Jamaica	Colombia	1–0	1–0	Friendly	
3	31 August 1997	National Stadium, Kingston, Jamaica	Trinidad and Tobago	–	6–1	Friendly	
4	25 April 2001	National Stadium, Kingston, Jamaica	Honduras	1–0	1–1	2002 FIFA World Cup qualification	
5	10 July 2001	National Stadium, Kingston, Jamaica	Cuba	2–0	4–1	Friendly	
6	18 November 2007	National Stadium, Kingston, Jamaica	El Salvador	2–0	3–0	Friendly	
7	18 November 2007	National Stadium, Kingston, Jamaica	El Salvador	3–0	3–0	Friendly	
8	3 June 2008	National Stadium, Kingston, Jamaica	Saint Vincent and the Grenadines	5–1	5–1	Friendly	
9	15 June 2008	National Stadium, Kingston, Jamaica	Bahamas	1–0	7–0	2010 FIFA World Cup qualification	

== Honours ==
Bolton Wanderers

- Football League First Division play-offs: 2001

Jamaica

- Caribbean Cup: 1998

Individual

- Bolton Wanderers Player of the Year: 2005–06

== See also ==
- List of men's footballers with 100 or more international caps
