= 2010–11 Bolton Wanderers F.C. season =

Bolton Wanderers
2010–11 season
- Chairman: Phil Gartside
- Manager: Owen Coyle
- Stadium: Reebok Stadium
- Premier League: 14th
- FA Cup: Semi-finalist
- League Cup: Third Round
- Top goalscorer: League: Johan Elmander (10); All: Johan Elmander (12)
- Highest home attendance: 26,881 vs Arsenal (24 April 2011)
- Lowest home attendance: 13,120 vs York City (8 January 2011)
- Average home league attendance: 22,028
Home colours	Away colours

The 2010–11 season was Bolton Wanderers's twelfth season in the Premier League, and their tenth consecutive season in the top-flight of English football.

It covers the period from 1 July 2010 to 30 June 2011. As Bolton Wanderers did not win the 2010–11 Premier League title, it is the 72nd time that they have competed at the top level without winning the title, the most of any club.

The home strip for the 2010–11 season was revealed on 23 April 2010. The Reebok strip represents a move back to a predominantly all white top. The away strip was revealed on 16 June and is blue with an orange and white trim.

== Pre-season ==
On 27 May, Bolton announced that they would be undertaking a three-game, pre-season tour of North America, taking in matches at Charlotte Eagles, Charleston Battery and Toronto F.C. Further games were announced on 29 May, against Rochdale on 24 July and Morecambe on 28 July, with a reserve team fixture against Fleetwood Town on 30 July. The game at Morecambe was designed to be the opening fixture at their new ground, The Globe Arena, but due to site delays the fixture was cancelled on 14 July and replaced by one at Oldham Athletic. The pre-season schedule announcements were concluded on 1 June when the club announced a small tour of Scotland to play Falkirk on 31 July before a game against Bolton manager Owen Coyle's former charges St Johnstone on 2 August. They also announced that the club's only pre-season game would be against La Liga club Osasuna on 6 August.

A 23-man squad, including new signing Martin Petrov but minus those that had participated in the 2010 FIFA World Cup travelled to the United States on 13 July. The first tour match took place on 14 July against Charlotte Eagles at the Transamerica Field, with Bolton running out 3–0 winners, the goals coming from Gary Cahill, Johan Elmander and Petrov. This was followed three days later with another victory, this time against Charleston Battery at Blackbaud Stadium, the goals this time coming from Kevin Davies and Tamir Cohen in a 2–0 win. The team then travelled across the border to take on Major League Soccer side Toronto where they were joined by Stuart Holden who had played for the USA in the World Cup. The match took place on 21 July at Toronto's BMO Field with the winner pronounced winner of the Carlsberg Cup. After a 1–1 draw, Matty Taylor scoring Bolton's goal, the winner of the trophy was decided by penalties. Holden, Robbie Blake, Sean Davis and Cahill scored for Bolton with Jussi Jääskeläinen saving two of the home side's efforts, thus ensuring Bolton would lift the trophy and finish the tour unbeaten.

On the team's return home they took on local rivals Rochdale at Spotland on the afternoon of 24 July. A Robbie Blake penalty opened the scoring, but Bolton could not finish their League One opponents off and the home side's Chris O'Grady equalised with six minutes remaining. Four days later, a strong side travelled to Oldham Athletic but were well beaten, Tom Eaves scoring all the goals in Oldham's 3–0 win. Eaves would move from Oldham to Bolton a little over two weeks later for an undisclosed fee.

The very end of July saw Bolton travel to Scotland for games against Falkirk and St. Johnstone. The Falkirk game saw the return of Lee Chung-Yong after his extended break following the World Cup. The return of the South Korean could not stop the game ending in a goalless stalemate. Two days later, St Johnstone welcomed Bolton to McDiarmid Park and the English side finished their pre-season away fixtures with a 2–0 victory, Martin Petrov and Johan Elmander scoring their second goals of the summer.

Bolton finished their pre-season schedule with a home match against Osasuna at the Reebok Stadium on 6 August. The result was, again, a 2–0 victory to the home side. Johan Elmander finished as the pre season's leading scorer when he netted early in the game, and Lee Chung-Yong scored his first of the summer shortly afterwards.

14 July 2010	Charlotte Eagles (United States)	0–3	(England) Bolton Wanderers	Transamerica Field
19:00 EDT		Report	Cahill 8'; Elmander 50'; Petrov 80'	Attendance: 2,383

17 July 2010	Charleston Battery (United States)	0–2	(England) Bolton Wanderers	Blackbaud Stadium
19:30 EDT		Report	K. Davies 30'; Cohen 51'	Attendance: 5,249

21 July 2010	Toronto (Canada)	1–1 (3–4 p)	(England) Bolton Wanderers	BMO Field
19:30 EDT	Correa 45'	Report	Taylor 28'	Attendance: 19,507

24 July 2010	Rochdale (England)	1–1	(England) Bolton Wanderers	Spotland
15:00 BST	O'Grady 84'	Report	Blake 35'	Attendance: 1,833

28 July 2010	Oldham Athletic (England)	3–0	(England) Bolton Wanderers	Boundary Park
19:30 BST	Eaves 26', 42', 56'	Report		Attendance: 1,871

31 July 2010	Falkirk (Scotland)	0–0	(England) Bolton Wanderers	Falkirk Stadium
15:00 BST		Report		Attendance: 2,104

2 August 2010	St Johnstone (Scotland)	0–2	(England) Bolton Wanderers	McDiarmid Park
19:45 BST		Report	Petrov 75'; Elmander 77'	Attendance: 2,076

6 August 2010	Bolton Wanderers (England)	2–0	(Spain) Osasuna	Reebok Stadium
20:00 BST	Elmander 11'; Lee 24'	Report		Attendance: 4,847

== Premier League ==
The fixtures for the 2010–11 season were announced on 17 June, and revealed that Bolton would begin their league campaign by welcoming Fulham to the Reebok Stadium in Mark Hughes' first competitive fixture as Fulham's manager. The match finished goalless with Bolton giving a debut to Martin Petrov. A week later, Bolton travelled to London to take on West Ham United. Goalless at half time, with Carlton Cole having a penalty saved by Jussi Jääskeläinen, Bolton took the lead early in the second half through a Matthew Upson own goal, which was followed by a Johan Elmander header. Although Mark Noble pulled a goal back from the penalty spot after Gary Cahill had been adjudged to have pushed Scott Parker, Elmander scored his second of the game with six minutes remaining. The game saw a debut for Robbie Blake.

Bolton's next match was at home to Birmingham City and was moved to the Sunday to allow for live television coverage. The game started badly for the home team, with Roger Johnson scoring for Birmingham in the first five minutes. Shortly before the end of the first half, the situation got worse when Jussi Jääskeläinen was sent off for slapping Johnson in the face. As a result, Hungarian goalkeeper Ádám Bogdán was brought on for Martin Petrov, to replace Jääskeläinen in goal, marking Bogdán's league debut. Birmingham doubled their advantage early in the second half through Craig Gardner. However, the ten men battled back, first through captain Kevin Davies, scoring his 100th league goal from the penalty spot after he himself was fouled in the area by Johnson, and then Robbie Blake, firing in a free-kick for his first goal for the club. The result saw Bolton finish the weekend in fifth place in the Premier League.

The following round of fixtures took place a fortnight later, due to an international break. On 3 September, Gary Cahill, who had been called up to previous squads without playing, became the first Bolton player to play for England since Michael Ricketts in 2002, in the national team's 4–0 win over Bulgaria.

Bolton returned to league football on 11 September, with an away fixture at Arsenal. Drawing 1–1 at half-time, through Johan Elmander's third league goal of the season, which saw him equal his league tally from the previous season, Bolton were 2–1 down when Cahill was sent off for a tackle on Marouane Chamakh. Playing against ten men, Arsenal dominated the rest of the game and ran out 4–1 winners. As a result, the club fell into the bottom half of the table for the first time that season. The club appealed the three-match ban that Cahill would have to serve for the sending off, but this was rejected. A week later, a second successive away game saw Bolton finish level with Aston Villa, in the last game before Gérard Houllier took over as manager of the Midlands club. Ashley Young put the home side ahead early on from a free-kick, but Bolton had drawn level by the end of the half, Kevin Davies netting his second league goal of the season, to put an end to the scoring.

Bolton's next home was again moved to the Sunday to allow for live television coverage, with the visitors being near neighbours, Manchester United. An early Zat Knight goal, flicking in a corner, gave Bolton the lead, but United equalised halfway through the first half, after Nani had run unchecked through Bolton's half before shooting from just outside the area past the returning Jussi Jääskeläinen. Bolton have only beaten Manchester United once at home in thirty years, but it looked like they would make it twice after Martin Petrov shot home with his unfavoured right foot in the sixty-seventh minute, scoring his first goal for the club in the process. The home side almost made it 3–1 soon after, but Johan Elmander failed to make a one on one with United keeper Edwin van der Sar count, and Bolton were made to rue this chance when Michael Owen, on as a substitute three minutes earlier, flicked on a Nani free-kick into Jääskeläinen's right-hand corner to make the final result 2–2. A fourth game without a win ensured that Bolton remained in the bottom half of the Premier League.

October began with an away game at newly promoted West Bromwich Albion. Kevin Davies set up Johan Elmander in the sixty fourth minute, but James Morrison equalised fourteen minutes later to earn the home side a draw. Elmander's goal, his fourth of the season, meant he had already scored more league goals this season than he had in the whole of the previous season. The day after, Kevin Davies was called up into the England squad for the first time and included in the squad to play Montenegro on 12 October. Later in the week, Gary Cahill was called into the squad as a late replacement for Phil Jagielka, meaning that, for the first time since Eddie Hopkinson and Doug Holden in 1959, Bolton had two representatives in the England squad. Although Cahill didn't make it onto the pitch, Davies made his international debut as a second-half substitute in the game.

Bolton returned to league action on 16 October with a home fixture against Stoke City. A Lee Chung-Yong goal midway through the first half sent Bolton in at halftime ahead, but Rory Delap equalised early in the second half. The game had moved into the fourth minute of injury time when substitute Ivan Klasnić scored what turned out to be the winning goal. Almost immediately, Klasnić was sent off after receiving two yellow cards in the two minutes after his goal.

A week later, Bolton played their first game of the season against near neighbours Wigan Athletic. Bolton would eventually play their closest rivals geographically four times, after drawing their FA Cup Fourth round tie. Hugo Rodallega opened the scoring at the DW Stadium but this was swiftly equalised by Johan Elmander as Bolton consolidated their position in the top half of the Premier League. However, the following Sunday, a late Maxi Rodríguez goal would see Liverpool beat Bolton and continue their good form at the Reebok Stadium, where they had not lost since 2006. The result saw Bolton finish October in tenth place.

November opened with a home fixture against Tottenham Hotspur, who had not won a league game at the Reebok Stadium. This run continued as two goals from Kevin Davies and a goal apiece for Grétar Steinsson and Martin Petrov saw Bolton run out 4–2 winners. This began a run of five unbeaten games throughout the month of November. On 10 November, a late Jermaine Beckford goal saw Everton salvage a draw at Goodison Park after Ivan Klasnić had put Bolton ahead. The following Saturday, Bolton raced into a 3–0 lead at Wolverhampton Wanderers through a Richard Stearman own goal, a Johan Elmander solo effort and a Stuart Holden strike, before Wolves pulled back two goals. A week later, Bolton earned their largest win of the season when Newcastle United came to the Reebok Stadium. This was the first game that former captain Kevin Nolan had played at Bolton since his move to Newcastle in January 2009. Two converted penalties by Kevin Davies, two more goals for Johan Elmander and one for Lee Chung-yong gave Bolton a 5–1 win. Bolton finished the month by welcoming Blackpool to the Reebok Stadium for the first time. It was also the first time the clubs had met for seventeen years. Trailing by two goals halfway through the second half, Bolton pulled the goals back, first through a Martin Petrov free kick and then a team effort completed by Mark Davies. Bolton finished the month in fifth place and challenging for European football.

December opened with a game at Manchester City who, despite having Aleksandar Kolarov sent off in the second half, kept hold of their one-goal lead, given to them in the first half by Carlos Tevez. The week after, Bolton themselves had a man sent off, with Mark Davies receiving his marching orders for elbowing Phil Jones with the game goalless. Fabrice Muamba then scored his first goal of the season but Blackburn equalised late on, with Mame Biram Diouf bringing the scores level. However, just one minute later, Stuart Holden ran onto a Kevin Davies header to score from twenty yards. The game would prove to be the last as Blackburn manager for former Bolton boss Sam Allardyce, who was fired the day after.

=== League table ===
Pos	Team	Pld	W	D	L	GF	GA	GD	Pts	Qualification or relegation
12	Newcastle United	38	11	13	14	56	57	−1	46	
13	Stoke City	38	13	7	18	46	48	−2	46	Qualification for the Europa League third qualifying round (Note: Stoke City qualified for the third qualifying round of the Europa League as FA Cup runners-up to Champions League-qualified Manchester City.)
14	Bolton Wanderers	38	12	10	16	52	56	−4	46	
15	Blackburn Rovers	38	11	10	17	46	59	−13	43	
16	Wigan Athletic	38	9	15	14	40	61	−21	42	

Source: Barclays Premier League
Rules for classification: 1) points; 2) goal difference; 3) number of goals scored.

=== Results summary ===
Overall								Home						Away					
Pld	W	D	L	GF	GA	GD	Pts	W	D	L	GF	GA	GD	W	D	L	GF	GA	GD
38	12	10	16	52	56	−4	46	10	5	4	34	24	+10	2	5	12	18	32	−14

Last updated: 4 March 2019.
Source: 11v11

=== Results per matchday ===
Matchday	1	2	3	4	5	6	7	8	9	10	11	12	13	14	15	16	17	18	19	20	21	22	23	24	25	26	27	28	29	30	31	32	33	34	35	36	37	38
Ground	H	A	H	A	A	H	A	H	A	H	H	A	A	H	H	A	H	A	H	A	A	H	A	H	H	A	H	A	H	A	A	H	H	A	A	H	A	H
Result	D	W	D	L	D	D	D	W	D	L	W	D	W	W	D	L	W	L	W	L	L	D	L	L	W	L	W	D	W	L	L	W	W	L	L	L	L	L
Position	8	3	5	12	12	12	11	7	8	10	5	6	5	4	5	6	6	7	6	6	7	7	7	8	8	8	7	6	7	8	8	8	8	8	8	9	9	14

Source: Statto.com
A = Away; H = Home; W = Win; D = Draw; L = Loss

14 August 2010	Bolton Wanderers	0–0	Fulham	Reebok Stadium
15:00 BST				Attendance: 20,352; Referee: Stuart Attwell

21 August 2010	West Ham United	1–3	Bolton Wanderers	Upton Park
15:00 BST	Noble 79' (pen.)		Upson 48' (o.g.); Elmander 68', 84'	Attendance: 32,533; Referee: Andre Marriner

29 August 2010	Bolton Wanderers	2–2	Birmingham City	Reebok Stadium
13:30 BST	K. Davies 71' (pen.); Blake 81'		Johnson 4'; Gardner 50'	Attendance: 18,139; Referee: Kevin Friend

11 September 2010	Arsenal	4–1	Bolton Wanderers	Emirates Stadium
15:00 BST	Koscielny 24'; Chamakh 58'; Song 78'; Vela 83'		Elmander 44'	Attendance: 59,876; Referee: Stuart Attwell

18 September 2010	Aston Villa	1–1	Bolton Wanderers	Villa Park
15:00 BST	A. Young 13'		K. Davies 35'	Attendance: 34,655; Referee: Mike Dean

26 September 2010	Bolton Wanderers	2–2	Manchester United	Reebok Stadium
12:00 BST	Knight 6'; Petrov 67'		Nani 23'; Owen 74'	Attendance: 23,926; Referee: Phil Dowd

2 October 2010	West Bromwich Albion	1–1	Bolton Wanderers	The Hawthorns
15:00 BST	Morrison 78'		Elmander 64'	Attendance: 22,846; Referee: Peter Walton

16 October 2010	Bolton Wanderers	2–1	Stoke City	Reebok Stadium
15:00 BST	Lee 22'; Klasnić 90+2'		Delap 48'	Attendance: 22,975; Referee: Peter Walton

23 October 2010	Wigan Athletic	1–1	Bolton Wanderers	DW Stadium
15:00 BST	Rodallega 59'		Elmander 66'	Attendance: 17,100; Referee: Howard Webb

31 October 2010	Bolton Wanderers	0–1	Liverpool	Reebok Stadium
16:00 GMT	Taylor (yellow card) 49'; Steinsson (yellow card) 89'		Konchesky (yellow card) 21'; Škrtel (yellow card) 75'; Rodríguez 86'	Attendance: 25,171; Referee: Martin Atkinson

6 November 2010	Bolton Wanderers	4–2	Tottenham Hotspur	Reebok Stadium
12:45 GMT	K. Davies 31', 76' (pen.); Steinsson 56'; Petrov 90+4'		Hutton 79'; Pavlyuchenko 87'	Attendance: 20,255; Referee: Chris Foy

10 November 2010	Everton	1–1	Bolton Wanderers	Goodison Park
20:00 GMT	Beckford 90+4'		Klasnić 79'	Attendance: 31,808 (400 away); Referee: Phil Dowd

13 November 2010	Wolverhampton Wanderers	2–3	Bolton Wanderers	Molineux
15:00 GMT	Foley 69'; Fletcher 77'		Stearman 1' (o.g.); Elmander 62'; Holden 67'	Attendance: 27,508; Referee: Peter Walton

20 November 2010	Bolton Wanderers	5–1	Newcastle United	Reebok Stadium
15:00 GMT	K. Davies 18' (pen.), 90+3' (pen.); Lee 39'; Elmander 50', 72'		Carroll 52'	Attendance: 22,203; Referee: Howard Webb

27 November 2010	Bolton Wanderers	2–2	Blackpool	Reebok Stadium
15:00 GMT	Petrov 76'; M. Davies 89'		Evatt 28'; Varney 57'	Attendance: 25,851; Referee: Mike Dean

4 December 2010	Manchester City	1–0	Bolton Wanderers	City of Manchester Stadium
15:00 GMT	Tevez 4'			Attendance: 46,860; Referee: Andre Marriner

12 December 2010	Bolton Wanderers	2–1	Blackburn Rovers	Reebok Stadium
13:30 GMT	Muamba 65'; Holden 88'		M. Diouf 88'	Attendance: 24,471; Referee: Mark Clattenburg

18 December 2010	Sunderland	1–0	Bolton Wanderers	Stadium of Light
12:45 GMT	Welbeck 32'			Attendance: 35,101; Referee: Chris Foy

26 December 2010	Bolton Wanderers	2–0	West Bromwich Albion	Reebok Stadium
15:00 GMT	Taylor 40'; Elmander 86'			Attendance: 23,413; Referee: Howard Webb

29 December 2010	Chelsea	1–0	Bolton Wanderers	Stamford Bridge
19:45 GMT	Malouda 61'			Attendance: 40,982; Referee: Mike Jones

1 January 2011	Liverpool	2–1	Bolton Wanderers	Anfield
15:00 GMT	Torres 49'; Cole 90+2'		K. Davies 43'	Attendance: 35,400; Referee: Kevin Friend

5 January 2011	Bolton Wanderers	1–1	Wigan Athletic	Reebok Stadium
20:00 GMT	Rodrigo 54'		Stam 80'	Attendance: 18,852; Referee: Phil Dowd

15 January 2011	Stoke City	2–0	Bolton Wanderers	Britannia Stadium
15:00 GMT	Higginbotham 37'; Etherington 63' (pen.)			Attendance: 26,809; Referee: Michael Oliver

24 January 2011	Bolton Wanderers	0–4	Chelsea	Reebok Stadium
20:00 GMT			Drogba 11'; Malouda 41'; Anelka 56'; Ramires 74'	Attendance: 22,837; Referee: Chris Foy

2 February 2011	Bolton Wanderers	1–0	Wolverhampton Wanderers	Reebok Stadium
20:00 GMT	Sturridge 90+2'			Attendance: 18,944; Referee: Peter Walton

5 February 2011	Tottenham Hotspur	2–1	Bolton Wanderers	White Hart Lane
15:00 GMT	Van der Vaart 6' (pen.); Kranjčar 90+2'		Sturridge 55'	Attendance: 36,197; Referee: Mark Clattenburg

13 February 2011	Bolton Wanderers	2–0	Everton	Reebok Stadium
16:00 GMT	Cahill 10'; Sturridge 67'			Attendance: 22,986; Referee: Lee Probert

26 February 2011	Newcastle United	1–1	Bolton Wanderers	St James' Park
15:00 GMT	Nolan 13'		Sturridge 38'	Attendance: 48,062; Referee: Chris Foy

5 March 2011	Bolton Wanderers	3–2	Aston Villa	Reebok Stadium
15:00 GMT	Cahill 45+2', 75'; Klasnić 86'		Bent 15'; Albrighton 64'	Attendance: 22,533; Referee: Kevin Friend

19 March 2011	Manchester United	1–0	Bolton Wanderers	Old Trafford
15:00 GMT	Berbatov 88'			Attendance: 75,486; Referee: Andre Marriner

2 April 2011	Birmingham City	2–1	Bolton Wanderers	St Andrew's
15:00 BST	Phillips 4'; Gardner 59'		Elmander 70'	Attendance: 26,142; Referee: Michael Oliver

9 April 2011	Bolton Wanderers	3–0	West Ham United	Reebok Stadium
15:00 BST	Sturridge 14', 51'; Lee 20'			Attendance: 25,857; Referee: Lee Probert

24 April 2011	Bolton Wanderers	2–1	Arsenal	Reebok Stadium
16:00 BST	Sturridge 38'; Cohen 90'		Van Persie 48'	Attendance: 26,881; Referee: Mike Jones

27 April 2011	Fulham	3–0	Bolton Wanderers	Craven Cottage
20:00 BST	Dempsey 15', 48'; Hangeland 65'			Attendance: 23,222; Referee: Anthony Taylor

30 April 2011	Blackburn Rovers	1–0	Bolton Wanderers	Ewood Park
15:00 BST	Olsson 20'			Attendance: 28,985; Referee: Mike Dean

7 May 2011	Bolton Wanderers	1–2	Sunderland	Reebok Stadium
15:00 BST	Klasnić 87'		Zenden 45'; Knight 90+4' (o.g.)	Attendance: 22,597; Referee: Kevin Friend

14 May 2011	Blackpool	4–3	Bolton Wanderers	Bloomfield Road
12:45 BST	Campbell 9', 45'; Puncheon 19'; Adam 63'		Davies 6'; Taylor 24'; Sturridge 53'	Attendance: 15,979; Referee: Andre Marriner

22 May 2011	Bolton Wanderers	0–2	Manchester City	Reebok Stadium
16:00 BST			Lescott 43'; Džeko 62'	Attendance: 26,285; Referee: Chris Foy

Last updated: 22 May 2011
Source: Bolton Wanderers F.C.
Note: Premier League fixtures not listed due to copyright

== FA Cup ==
Bolton Wanderers entered the 2010–11 FA Cup at the Third Round stage, the draw being made on 28 November 2010. Bolton were drawn against non-league opposition in the form of York City, the first time that they had played a non-league side since beating Yeovil Town ten years previously. The match was played on 8 January 2011.

Bolton started the game showing seven changes from their previous game against Wigan Athletic and struggled to break down York. It took the introduction of first choice forwards Kevin Davies and Johan Elmander to make the difference, Davies scoring in the eighty-third minute and Elmander scoring with a drive from outside the box six minutes later.

The draw for the fourth round was made the following afternoon and saw Bolton drawn against their nearest local rivals, Wigan Athletic. The match took place on 29 January and ended goalless. The draw for the fifth round took place the day after and gave the winner of the replay an away tie at Fulham on 20 February. The replay took place at the DW Stadium on 16 February, where a single goal from Ivan Klasnić took Bolton through to the fifth round. The draw for the sixth round took place whilst Bolton were still playing at Craven Cottage and saw the winners of the game drawn away at Birmingham City. Again, a single Klasnić goal scored early in the first half, saw Bolton go through to the quarter-finals.

The quarter-final was played on 12 April and was shown live on ESPN. A goal early in the first half by Johan Elmander was cancelled out by Cameron Jerome before half-time, the first goal that Bolton had conceded in that year's competition. A Kevin Davies penalty restored Bolton's lead in the second half, but Kevin Phillips hit a dipping shot over Jussi Jääskeläinen, playing his 500th game for Bolton, to again bring Birmingham level. However, a Lee Chung-yong header, early in added time, completed the scoring and took Bolton into the Semi-final for the first time in eleven years. The day after, England coaches Hope Powell and Fabio Capello performed the semi-final draw, and Bolton was paired with Stoke City with Bolton the home team for the game at Wembley Stadium.

The game was played on 17 April, with whoever won the tie knowing that they would be playing Manchester City in the final after their victory over Manchester United the day before. Stoke ran out 5–0 victors, the largest FA Cup Semi-final win since before World War II, with former Bolton player Jonathan Walters scoring twice. Bolton captain Kevin Davies later apologised to the fans for the performance of the players.

8 January 2011 R3	Bolton Wanderers	2–0	York City	Reebok Stadium
15:00 GMT	K. Davies 83'; Elmander 89'			Attendance: 13,120; Referee: Keith Hill

29 January 2011 R4	Bolton Wanderers	0–0	Wigan Athletic	Reebok Stadium
15:00 GMT				Attendance: 14,950; Referee: Andre Marriner

16 February 2011 R4 Replay	Wigan Athletic	0–1	Bolton Wanderers	DW Stadium
19:45 GMT			Klasnić 66'	Attendance: 7,515; Referee: Michael Oliver

20 February 2011 R5	Fulham	0–1	Bolton Wanderers	Craven Cottage
15:00 GMT			Klasnić 19'	Attendance: 19,571; Referee: Stuart Attwell

12 March 2011 R6	Birmingham City	2–3	Bolton Wanderers	St Andrew's
12:45 GMT	Jerome 38'; Phillips 80'		Elmander 21'; K. Davies 66' (pen.); Lee 90'	Attendance: 23,699; Referee: Phil Dowd

17 April 2011 semi-final	Bolton Wanderers	0–5	Stoke City	Wembley Stadium
16:00 BST			Etherington 11'; Huth 17'; Jones 30'; Walters 68', 81'	Attendance: 75,064; Referee: Howard Webb

== League Cup ==
Bolton Wanderers entered the 2010–11 Football League Cup at the Second Round stage, the draw being made on 11 August 2010. It saw Bolton given an away tie at League One side Southampton, who they had not faced since Southampton were relegated from the Premier League in 2005. The game was played on 24 August and saw the debut of young Hungarian goalkeeper Ádám Bogdán. He kept a clean sheet in a 1–0 win, Ivan Klasnić scoring the only goal in the first half.

The draw for the third round was made on 29 August and saw Owen Coyle's side drawn against his previous club Burnley, who he had left to join Bolton the previous January, with the game played at Turf Moor on 21 September. Bolton made numerous changes to the team that had played the previous Saturday at Aston Villa. A Wade Elliott goal, shortly before half time, was the only goal of the game and brought to an end Bolton's participation in the competition.

24 August 2010 R2	Southampton	0–1	Bolton Wanderers	St Mary's Stadium
19:45 BST			Klasnić 31'	Attendance: 10,251; Referee: Keith Hill

21 September 2010 R3	Burnley	1–0	Bolton Wanderers	Turf Moor
19:45 BST	Elliott 45'			Attendance: 17,602; Referee: Mark Clattenburg

== Squad statistics ==
No.	Pos.	Name	League		FA Cup		League Cup		Total		Discipline	
No.	Pos.	Name	Apps	Goals	Apps	Goals	Apps	Goals	Apps	Goals	Yellow card	Red card
1	GK	Ádám Bogdán	3(1)	0	3	0	2	0	8(1)	0	0	0
2	DF	Grétar Steinsson	23	1	2	0	1	0	25	1	7	0
3	DF	Jlloyd Samuel	0	0	0	0	0	0	0	0	0	0
4	DF	Paul Robinson	35	0	5	0	0	0	40	0	10	0
5	DF	Gary Cahill	36	3	4	0	0	0	39	3	8	1
6	MF	Fabrice Muamba	32(3)	1	4	0	0	0	36(3)	1	7	0
7	MF	Matthew Taylor	22(14)	2	1(2)	0	2	0	25(15)	2	4	0
8	MF	Stuart Holden	26	2	2(1)	0	0(1)	0	29(2)	2	4	0
9	FW	Johan Elmander	37	10	4(2)	2	0(2)	0	40(4)	12	5	0
10	MF	Martin Petrov	18(9)	3	6	0	0	0	23(9)	3	1	0
11	MF	Ricardo Gardner	3(2)	0	0	0	1	0	4(2)	0	0	0
12	DF	Zat Knight	34	1	3	0	2	0	38	1	2	0
13	GK	Rob Lainton	0	0	0	0	0	0	0	0	0	0
14	FW	Kevin Davies	38	8	4(2)	2	1	0	42(2)	10	12	0
15	MF	Riga Mustapha	0	0	0	0	0	0	0	0	0	0
15	FW	Daniel Sturridge	11(1)	8	0	0	0	0	11(1)	8	0	1
16	MF	Mark Davies	9(14)	1	3(2)	0	2	0	14(16)	0	6	1
17	FW	Ivan Klasnić	0(21)	4	5	2	2	1	7(21)	7	1	1
18	DF	Sam Ricketts	14(3)	0	3	0	2	0	19(3)	0	2	0
19	MF	Rodrigo	4(12)	1	1(2)	0	1	0	6(14)	1	0	0
20	FW	Robbie Blake	0(8)	1	1(1)	0	2	0	3(9)	1	1	0
21	MF	Tamir Cohen	3(4)	1	0(2)	0	1	0	4(6)	1	2	0
22	GK	Jussi Jääskeläinen	35	0	3	0	0	0	38	0	1	1
23	MF	Sean Davis	0	0	0	0	0	0	0	0	0	0
25	DF	Marcos Alonso	4	0	2(1)	0	2	0	7(1)	0	2	0
26	GK	Ali Al-Habsi	0	0	0	0	0	0	0	0	0	0
27	MF	Lee Chung-Yong	25(6)	3	3(1)	1	0(1)	0	28(8)	4	1	0
28	MF	Joey O'Brien	0	0	0	0	0	0	0	0	0	0
29	FW	Michael O'Halloran	0	0	0	0	0	0	0	0	0	0
31	DF	Andy O'Brien	1(1)	0	0	0	1	0	2(1)	0	0	0
31	DF	David Wheater	5(2)	0	3	0	0	0	8(2)	0	4	0
33	FW	Danny Ward	0	0	0	0	0	0	0	0	0	0
35	FW	Tope Obadeyi	0	0	0	0	0	0	0	0	0	0
40	FW	Tom Eaves	0	0	0	0	0	0	0	0	0	0
44	MF	Josh Vela	0	0	0	0	0	0	0	0	0	0
–	–	Own goals	–	2	–	0	–	0	–	2		

Statistics accurate as of match played 22 May 2011

== Transfers ==
On the commencement of the summer transfer window on 1 July, Portuguese striker Ricardo Vaz Tê, who has been at the club since 2003, was released. At the same time, young Australian midfielder Aaron Mooy turned down the chance of a new contract and also left. Coming into the club were Martin Petrov, signed on a free transfer from Manchester City and Robbie Blake from manager Owen Coyle's former club Burnley, also on a free transfer. In the middle of July, as the team prepared to fly to the United States for their pre season tour, the club agreed a season long loan deal with Wigan Athletic for second choice goalkeeper Ali Al-Habsi. Later in the month, Spain under-19 international Marcos Alonso signed from Spain's giants Real Madrid for an undisclosed fee. This allowed the club to let long serving defender Nicky Hunt leave on a free transfer to Bristol City three days later.

August saw the club sign Croatian international Ivan Klasnić, who had been at the club the previous season on loan, from Nantes after the player had negotiated his release from the French club, as well as young striker Tom Eaves from Oldham Athletic for an undisclosed fee. Eaves had scored a hat trick for Oldham against Bolton in a friendly a fortnight earlier. A day after Eaves was signed, Bolton sold Chris Basham to Premier League new boys Blackpool, again for an undisclosed fee.

As the summer transfer window closed, a loan deal with Benfica of Portugal was made to bring young Spanish international Rodrigo to the Reebok Stadium for the season. At the same time, Bolton agreed a mutual termination with Nigerian international Danny Shittu, and he left the club.

As the closure of the transfer window does not preclude Premier League clubs loaning players to lower league teams, Danny Ward joined Championship team Coventry City until the New Year, but this was cut short in the middle of October when the player suffered a groin injury and returned to Bolton. Tope Obadeyi was loaned to League Two side Shrewsbury Town for an initial month in mid October and this loan was extended at its conclusion for another month.

When the January transfer window opened, Irish international Andy O'Brien, who had been on loan at Championship team Leeds United since the end of October, joined them on a permanent basis. As a replacement, Bolton signed David Wheater from Middlesbrough for an undisclosed fee. Riga Mustapha, who had rejected a deal to terminate his contract in September, finally agreed and left the club after making twenty two appearances since he joined in 2008. On transfer deadline day, Bolton signed Daniel Sturridge on loan from Chelsea until the end of the season.

=== In ===
Date	Pos.	Name	From	Fee
1 July 2010	MF	Martin Petrov	Manchester City	Free
1 July 2010	FW	Robbie Blake	Burnley	Free
27 July 2010	DF	Marcos Alonso	Real Madrid	£2,160,000
4 August 2010	FW	Ivan Klasnić	Nantes	Free
12 August 2010	FW	Tom Eaves	Oldham Athletic	£221,000
20 January 2011	DF	David Wheater	Middlesbrough	£2,480,000

=== Out ===
Date	Pos.	Name	To	Fee
1 July 2010	FW	Ricardo Vaz Tê	Panionios	Free
1 July 2010	MF	Aaron Mooy	St Mirren	Free
30 July 2010	DF	Nicky Hunt	Bristol City	Free
13 August 2010	MF	Chris Basham	Blackpool	£1,260,000
2 September 2010	DF	Danny Shittu	Millwall	Free
4 January 2011	DF	Andy O'Brien	Leeds United	Free
27 January 2011	MF	Riga Mustapha	Cartagena	Free

=== Loan in ===
Date from	Date to	Pos.	Name	From
31 August 2010	30 June 2011	MF	Rodrigo	Benfica
31 January 2011	30 June 2011	FW	Daniel Sturridge	Chelsea

=== Loan out ===
Date from	Date to	Pos.	Name	To
15 July 2010	30 June 2011	GK	Ali Al-Habsi	Wigan Athletic
10 September 2010	14 October 2010	MF	Danny Ward	Coventry City
22 October 2010	8 January 2011	FW	Tope Obadeyi	Shrewsbury Town
29 October 2010	4 January 2011	DF	Andy O'Brien	Leeds United
8 March 2011	6 April 2011	MF	Ricardo Gardner	Preston North End
15 March 2011	31 May 2011	MF	Danny Ward	Huddersfield Town
23 March 2011	4 May 2011	MF	Joey O'Brien	Sheffield Wednesday
23 March 2011	31 May 2011	DF	Jlloyd Samuel	Cardiff City

== Mid-season friendlies ==
15 November 2010	Cliftonville	0–2	Bolton Wanderers	Solitude
20:00 GMT		Report	Klasnić 20'; Coyle 68'	Attendance: 1,020

Last updated: 8 January 2011
Source: Bolton Wanderers F.C.
