= Sam Ricketts =

Wales international football player and manager

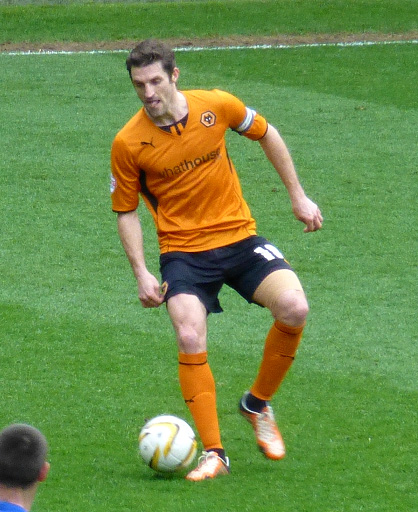
- Ricketts playing for Wolverhampton Wanderers in 2014

Personal information
- Full name: Samuel Derek Ricketts
- Date of birth: 11 October 1981 (age 45)
- Place of birth: Aylesbury, England
- Height: 6 ft 1 in (1.85 m)
- Position: Defender

Youth career
- –2000: Oxford United

Senior career*
Years	Team	Apps	(Gls)
2000–2003	Oxford United	45	(1)
2002–2003	→ Nuneaton Borough (loan)	11	(1)
2003–2004	Telford United	41	(4)
2004–2006	Swansea City	86	(1)
2006–2009	Hull City	113	(1)
2009–2013	Bolton Wanderers	96	(1)
2013–2015	Wolverhampton Wanderers	48	(2)
2015	→ Swindon Town (loan)	9	(0)
2015–2016	Coventry City	46	(1)
Total		495	(12)

International career
2003–2004	England C	4	(1)
2005–2014	Wales	52	(0)

Managerial career
- 2018: Wrexham
- 2018–2020: Shrewsbury Town
- * Club domestic league appearances and goals

Samuel Derek Ricketts (born 11 October 1981) is a professional football coach and former player.

As a player, his favoured position was at full back, where he was able to play either side as well as being able to operate at the centre of defence. He played over 100 games for Swansea City before playing Premier League football for both Hull City and Bolton Wanderers. He left Bolton in 2013 and captained Wolverhampton Wanderers to the League One title with a record points total. Furthermore, he represented Wales at international level, making over 50 appearances for the national team.

== Early life ==
Ricketts was born in Aylesbury, Buckinghamshire. His family is highly involved in equestrianism. His father is the 1978 world showjumping champion Derek Ricketts, later performance manager of the UK showjumping team from 2002 to 2010, and his uncle is the former National Hunt champion jockey John Francome. As a teenager, Ricketts himself was a keen rider until prioritising football.

== Club career ==
=== Early career ===
Ricketts began his career at Oxford United, making his first team debut on 8 October 2000 in a 2–1 Second Division defeat at rivals Swindon Town. He played 48 total games and scored once, in a 2–0 home win over Southend United on 22 September 2001.

In 2002 he was loaned to Nuneaton Borough of the Football Conference. On 26 December, he was sent off in the 25th minute of a 2–1 home loss to Burton Albion for a foul on John Burns. In the last of his 11 games for Nuneaton, he scored the equaliser in a 1–1 home draw with leaders Yeovil Town on 25 January 2003.

He was released from his professional contract to sign for Conference side Telford United in the summer of 2003. His form for Telford led him to be selected for the England non-League XI that season. On 6 April 2004, he scored the only goal of a win against Shropshire rivals Shrewsbury Town at the New Bucks Head.

=== Swansea City ===
Telford United went out of business at the end of the 2003–04 season, meaning Ricketts' contract was annulled. Swansea manager Kenny Jackett offered him a return to league football though, and he joined Swansea City on a two-year deal on 27 May 2004.

He helped the team to promotion from League Two in his first season, during which he was selected in the division's PFA Team of the Year. At the end of the campaign he was rewarded for his performances with a new improved contract. His second season saw the team reach the League One Play-off Final, but Ricketts was part of the team that lost on penalties to Barnsley.

=== Hull City ===
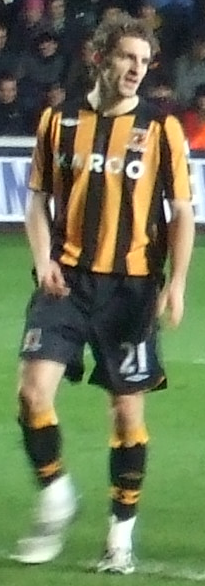
Ricketts playing for Hull City in 2009

After 103 appearances in total for Swansea, Ricketts moved to Championship club Hull City on 14 July 2006 on a three-year contract. Hull triggered his release clause by paying £300,000. He started every minute of Hull's first ten games but sustained a broken cheekbone in the tenth game – a win against Hartlepool United – that required an operation, thereby ruling him out for several weeks. He made 45 appearances during the season, and scored his only goal for Hull on 31 March 2007, in a 4–0 home win over Southend United.

The defender was part of the Hull team that won promotion to the Premier League for the first time in the club's history at the end of the 2007–08 season; he played in their Championship play-off final victory over Bristol City. Hull manager Phil Brown had stated in advance of this that he wanted to extend Ricketts' contract due to his performances.

Ricketts made 29 league appearances for the Tigers in their inaugural top-flight campaign, as they narrowly avoided relegation on the final day of the season. Following this, he entered into talks regarding a new deal with the club, but had been linked to other Premier League clubs.

=== Bolton Wanderers ===
On 25 July 2009, fellow Premier League club Bolton Wanderers confirmed Ricketts had signed a three-year deal with them for an undisclosed fee. He made his debut in a 1–0 defeat to Sunderland on 15 August and went on to play in every defensive position for the club.

In February 2011 he suffered a snapped Achilles tendon during an FA Cup replay against Wigan Athletic, which put him out of first team contention until the end of the year. He made his return on New Year's Eve 2011, where he also scored his first Bolton goal, in a 1–1 draw against his future club Wolverhampton Wanderers. Ricketts' contract expired at the end of the 2011–12 season but, despite Bolton being relegated from the Premier League, he signed a new two-year deal with the club in the summer of 2012. On 4 July 2013, after a season in which the team failed to make an instant return to the top flight, Bolton confirmed that his contract had been cancelled by mutual agreement.

He later expressed his disappointment at leaving Bolton Wanderers.

=== Wolverhampton Wanderers ===
On the same day as his exit from Bolton, Ricketts joined Wolverhampton Wanderers of League One as a free agent in a two-year deal, reuniting with his former Swansea manager Kenny Jackett. Having been appointed club captain, he made his debut on 3 August 2013 in a goalless draw at Preston North End. Ricketts was a regular member of the Wolves team that won the League One title that season with a record 103 points. He scored his first goal for the club in a 6–4 win against Rotherham United on 18 April 2014.

Back in the Championship, Ricketts seldom featured for Wolves, despite remaining club captain, and in January 2015 was made available for loan. Soon after he took on a coaching role at the club, but on 21 March 2015, left to join League One promotion contenders Swindon Town on loan for the remainder of the season. He helped the club to the play-off final, scoring an equaliser in the semi-final at Sheffield United, but the Robins lost the Wembley final 4–0 to Preston, in which Ricketts came on as an early substitute.

On 17 June 2015 it was announced that his contract with Wolves will not be renewed.

=== Coventry City ===
Ricketts signed for Coventry City on 6 July 2015 signing a one-year deal with the club. In July 2016 his contract was extended until the end of the 2016–17 season. On 16 November 2016, he was forced to retire from football because of a knee injury.

== International career ==
Although born in England, Ricketts was eligible for the Wales national football team due to a Welsh grandmother. He made his international debut for Wales on 9 February 2005 in a friendly against Hungary that was John Toshack's first game in charge after his return as manager. On 6 September 2013, he reached the milestone of 50 caps in a 2–1 loss away to Macedonia in 2014 FIFA World Cup qualification.

== Managerial career ==
=== Wrexham ===
After his retirement from playing, Ricketts integrated into coaching, inaugurally spending a week working alongside Brendan Rodgers's backroom staff at Scottish Premiership champions Celtic. Rodgers then advised Ricketts to begin coaching at academy level to gain experience, with the latter taking his advice and joined the academy coaching set-up at his former side Wolverhampton Wanderers in 2017.

A year into his role, Ricketts left to become the first team manager of National League club Wrexham, signing a three-year contract, beginning on 2 May 2018. On his managerial debut, his team won 1–0 at Dover Athletic. During his brief spell in charge, Ricketts guided Wrexham to 13 victories out of a possible 23, with his side constantly being in the running to gain promotion to the Football League throughout his tenure.

On 1 December 2018, he was told by club officials to stay away from their FA Cup second round match against Newport County, amid speculation that he was poised to be appointed the new manager of League One side Shrewsbury Town, a local rival. With compensation agreed, he was subsequently appointed their manager days later; Wrexham were sat fourth in the table when he left.

=== Shrewsbury Town ===
On 3 December 2018, Ricketts was appointed manager of Shrewsbury on a 2 1/2-year contract, leaving a Wrexham side fourth in the table. Two days later in his first match, Shrewsbury won 2–1 against Walsall to reach the third round of the EFL Trophy; he was the first manager to win on his Shrewsbury debut since Graham Turner in 2010. He brought in eight players in the January 2019 transfer window including Tyrese Campbell, Ro-Shaun Williams and Scott Golbourne. In early 2019, Ricketts lead the club to the fourth round of the FA Cup. The club's cup run ended at the hands of rivals, and one of Ricketts' former clubs, Wolverhampton Wanderers. Town were 2–0 up in the original tie at New Meadow with just under 20 minutes to play, but late goals from Raúl Jiménez and Matt Doherty took the tie to a replay at Molineux. Ricketts' Shrewsbury side went 2–1 up in the replay, only to eventually lose 3–2. A 1–1 draw away at Coventry City on 28 April mathematically secured League One survival for Ricketts and the club.

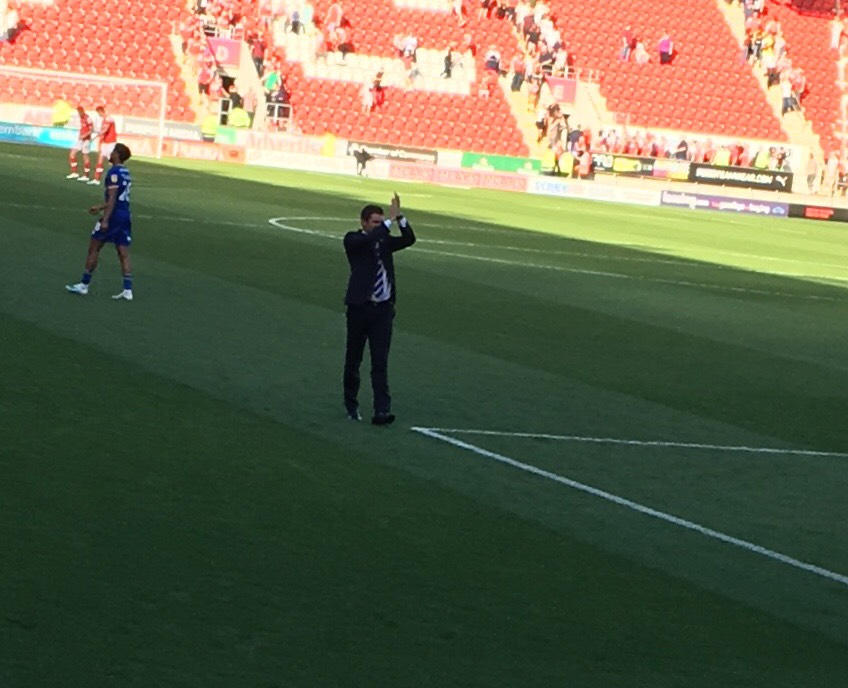
Ricketts managing Shrewsbury in September 2019

In the summer of 2019, Ricketts made more notable signings to strengthen the squad for the upcoming 2019–20 season, bringing in players such as Jason Cummings from Nottingham Forest, Sean Goss from Queens Park Rangers, Donald Love from Sunderland, Ethan Ebanks-Landell from Wolves and Aaron Pierre from Northampton Town. Ricketts started the season with a 1–0 win at home to Portsmouth on 4 August, with loanee Ryan Giles scoring the goal. During the 2019–20 season, Ricketts lead the club to the fourth round of the FA Cup for the second time during his management spell, defeating Bradford City, Mansfield Town and Bristol City along the way. The fourth round would see Ricketts and his Shrewsbury side host Premier League leaders and European and World champions Liverpool, where Shrewsbury came from 0–2 down to draw 2–2 with 2 goals from substitute Jason Cummings, forcing a replay at Anfield. In the replay, Shrewsbury fell short after a Shaun Whalley goal was disallowed by VAR for offside and an own goal from Ro-Shaun Williams saw the hosts win 1–0. This cup run brought repercussions, however, as Ricketts and the club went 10 league games without a win between December 2019 and February 2020. A 2–0 home defeat to Accrington Stanley on 11 February 2020 followed by another 2–0 defeat away at Portsmouth on 15 February put Ricketts' job under severe pressure. The winless run ended a week later on 22 February after a 1–0 win at home to Doncaster Rovers. On 14 March 2020, Ricketts and his Shrewsbury side were scheduled to take on top-of-the-table Coventry City at St Andrew's, however the match was postponed due to the outbreak of COVID-19. Due to the pandemic, the 2019–20 League One season was cut short and it was decided that final league positions would be based on a points-per-game basis. This saw the club finish 15th in the final table.

With first-team midfielder Josh Laurent leaving for Championship club Reading, Ricketts looked to strengthen his Shrewsbury squad again in the summer of 2020. The departure of Irish goalkeeper Joe Murphy also meant Ricketts only had 1 senior goalkeeper. On 3 August, Ricketts managed to get 3 deals over the line, bringing in striker Rekeil Pyke from Huddersfield Town and promising Northern Irish winger Josh Daniels from Glenavon, as well as the loan signing of young midfielder Scott High, also from Huddersfield Town. The club played their first pre-season friendly of the season on 11 August, beating Cymru Premier side Bala Town 3–0 at Telford United's New Bucks Head. Two days later on 13 August, defender Omar Beckles rejected a new contract and subsequently also left the club, leaving a gap in Ricketts' defence. On 18 August, Ricketts won his second pre-season friendly of the season, defeating Nuneaton Borough 3–1 at home. (Note: During the summer of 2020, the club played their pre-season home fixtures at AFC Telford United's New Bucks Head in Wellington to allow pitch works at New Meadow, that had been delayed due to the COVID-19 pandemic, to take place.) This was followed by a defeat 0–1 home defeat to rivals Walsall on 21 August, a 5–1 defeat away at Stoke City on 25 August and a 1–0 win over Wolverhampton Wanderers U23, also on 25 August. On 28 August, Ricketts managed to strengthen his defence with the loan signing of United States U20 international Marlon Fossey from Fulham. The club's final pre-season friendly took place on 29 August, a 2–1 win away at Premier League club Burnley. On 2 September, Ricketts managed to fill the goalkeeper void, bringing in Montenegro international Matija Sarkic on loan from Wolverhampton Wanderers.

Ricketts and the team had a steady but rocky start to the 2020–21 League One season, drawing 3 and losing 1 of their first 4 played games. Ricketts' first win of the season came on 17 October when a stoppage time winner from new signing Leon Clarke confirmed a 1–0 win at AFC Wimbledon. Four consecutive defeats then followed, including a 5–1 defeat away at Peterborough United on 31 October. Two more draws and another defeat later and the club found themselves in the relegation zone and only off the bottom of the table on goal difference. A 2–2 draw at Milton Keynes Dons, in which The Shrews led 2–0, on 24 November turned out to be the last straw as Ricketts and assistant manager Dean Whitehead were relieved of their duties a day later on 25 November. The club sat 23rd in League One after 13 league games, gaining only 9 points from a possible 39.

== Personal life ==
After leaving Shrewsbury Town in November 2020, Ricketts opened a builder's merchant.

== Career statistics ==
=== Club ===
Appearances and goals by club, season and competition
Club	Season	League			FA Cup		League Cup		Other		Total	
Club	Season	Division	Apps	Goals	Apps	Goals	Apps	Goals	Apps	Goals	Apps	Goals
Oxford United	2000–01	Second Division	14	0	0	0	0	0	1 (Note: Appearances in Football League Trophy)	0	15	0
Oxford United	2001–02	Third Division	29	1	0	0	1	0	1	0	31	1
Oxford United	2002–03	Third Division	2	0	0	0	0	0	0	0	2	0
Oxford United	Total		45	1	0	0	1	0	2	0	48	1
Nuneaton Borough (loan)	2002–03	Football Conference	11	1	0	0	0	0	0	0	11	1
Telford United	2003–04	Football Conference	41	4	5	1	0	0	5 (Note: Appearances in FA Trophy)	1	51	6
Swansea City	2004–05	League Two	42	0	5	0	1	0	2	1	50	1
Swansea City	2005–06	League One	44	1	1	0	1	0	9 (Note: Appearances in 2006 Football League play-offs)	1	55	2
Swansea City	Total		86	1	6	0	2	0	11	2	105	3
Hull City	2006–07	Championship	40	1	2	0	3	0	0	0	45	1
Hull City	2007–08	Championship	44	0	0	0	2	0	3 (Note: Appearances in 2008 Football League play-offs)	0	49	0
Hull City	2008–09	Premier League	29	0	6	0	0	0	0	0	35	0
Hull City	Total		113	1	8	0	5	0	3	0	129	1
Bolton Wanderers	2009–10	Premier League	27	0	3	0	3	0	0	0	33	0
Bolton Wanderers	2010–11	Premier League	17	0	3	0	2	0	0	0	22	0
Bolton Wanderers	2011–12	Premier League	20	1	4	0	0	0	0	0	24	1
Bolton Wanderers	2012–13	Championship	32	0	2	0	0	0	0	0	34	0
Bolton Wanderers	Total		96	1	12	0	5	0	0	0	113	1
Wolverhampton Wanderers	2013–14	League One	44	2	2	0	0	0	0	0	46	2
Wolverhampton Wanderers	2014–15	Championship	4	0	0	0	1	1	0	0	5	1
Wolverhampton Wanderers	Total		48	2	2	0	1	0	0	0	51	2
Swindon Town (loan)	2014–15	League One	9	0	0	0	0	0	2 (Note: Appearances in 2015 Football League play-offs)	1	11	1
Coventry City	2015–16	League One	43	1	1	0	1	0	1	0	46	1
Coventry City	2016–17	League One	3	0	0	0	1	0	0	0	4	0
Coventry City	Total		46	1	1	0	2	0	1	0	50	1
Career total			495	12	34	1	16	1	24	4	569	18

=== International ===
Wales
Year	Apps	Goals
2005	9	0
2006	5	0
2007	11	0
2008	7	0
2009	5	0
2010	4	0
2011	1	0
2012	4	0
2013	5	0
2014	1	0
Total	52	0

=== Managerial ===
As of match played 24 November 2020

Managerial record by team and tenure
Team	From	To	Record				
Team	From	To	P	W	D	L	Win %
Wrexham (Note: Soccerbase's total includes the FA Cup match against Newport County that Wrexham told him to stay away from.)	2 May 2018	3 December 2018	23	13	7	3	56.5
Shrewsbury Town	3 December 2018	25 November 2020	96	28	34	34	29.2
Total			119	41	41	37	34.5

== Honours ==
=== As a player ===
Swansea City

- Football League Two third-place promotion: 2004–05
- Football League Trophy: 2005–06

Hull City

- Football League Championship play-offs: 2008

Wolverhampton Wanderers

- Football League One: 2013–14

Individual

- PFA Team of the Year: 2004–05 League Two, 2013–14 League One

=== As a manager ===
Individual

- National League Manager of the Month: October 2018
