= Ali Al-Habsi =

Omani footballer (born 1981)

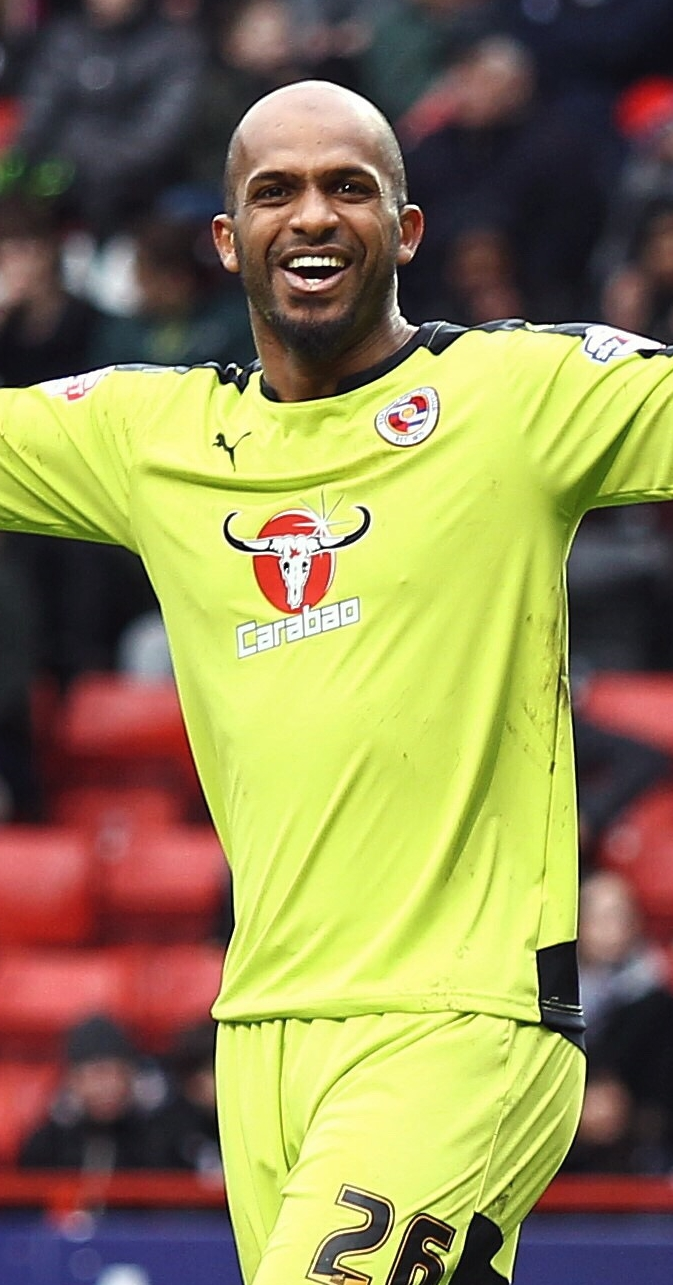
- Al-Habsi playing for Reading in 2016

Personal information
- Full name: Ali Abdullah Harib Al-Habsi
- Date of birth: 30 December 1981 (age 44)
- Place of birth: Muscat, Oman
- Height: 1.94 m (6 ft 4 in)
- Position: Goalkeeper

Senior career*
Years	Team	Apps	(Gls)
1998–2002	Al-Mudhaibi	35	(0)
2002–2003	Al-Nasr	4	(0)
2003–2006	Lyn Oslo	62	(0)
2006–2011	Bolton Wanderers	10	(0)
2010–2011	→ Wigan Athletic (loan)	34	(0)
2011–2015	Wigan Athletic	102	(0)
2014	→ Brighton & Hove Albion (loan)	1	(0)
2015–2017	Reading	78	(0)
2017–2019	Al-Hilal	34	(0)
2019–2020	West Bromwich Albion	0	(0)
Total		360	(0)

International career
2001–2019	Oman	147	(0)
- * Club domestic league appearances and goals

Ali Abdullah Harib Al-Habsi (Arabic: علي بن عبد الله بن حارب الحبسي; born 30 December 1981) is an Omani professional footballer who played as a goalkeeper. He played for the Oman national team for nearly two decades, from 2001 to 2019.

== Club career ==
=== Early career ===
Al-Habsi was born in Oman and started his early career in the country, racking up appearances before his move.

=== Bolton Wanderers ===
His transfer from Lyn Oslo to Bolton Wanderers in January 2006 was a transfer highlighted in the Stevens inquiry report, in June 2007. The report expressed concerns because of the apparent conflict of interest between agent Craig Allardyce, his father Sam Allardyce – and the club itself.

Al-Habsi did not make any first team appearances in his first year at Bolton. Al-Habsi made his full Bolton debut in the 2–1 extra time League Cup victory over Fulham in September 2007.

Al-Habsi then went on to make a further 15 appearances during the course of the 2007–08 season, most notably his performance against Bayern Munich in the UEFA Cup against whom he produced several good saves against the star-studded German team. He made his first Premier League start against Wigan Athletic. In December 2008, he was rewarded for his work with an extension to his contract until 2013. Despite this, Al-Habsi lost his place when Jussi Jääskeläinen returned from injury.

=== Wigan Athletic (loan) ===
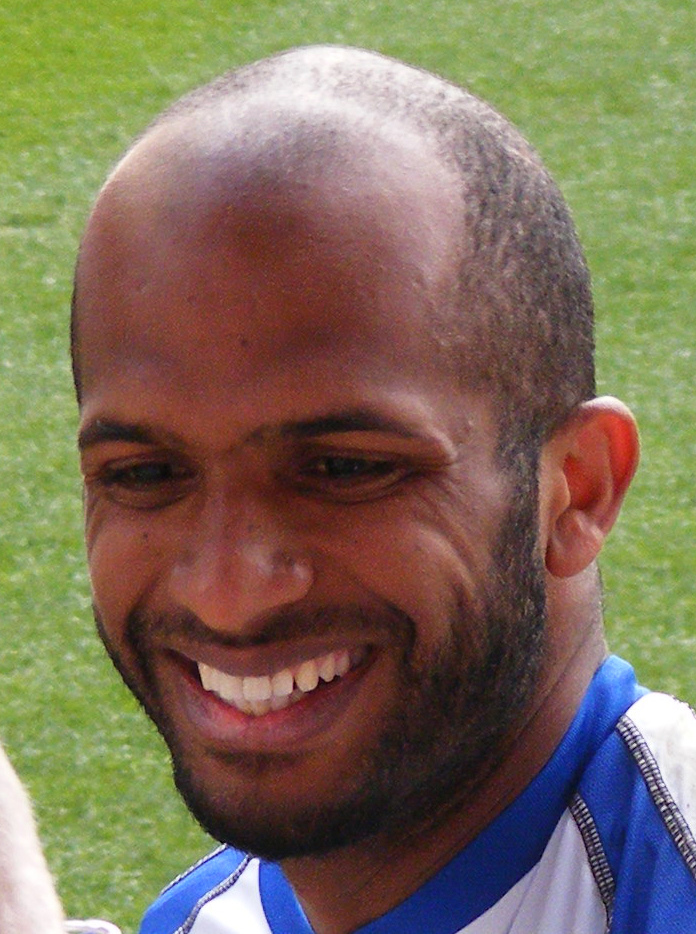
Al-Habsi training with Wigan Athletic in 2011

In July 2010, Al-Habsi joined local rivals Wigan Athletic on a season-long loan. He made his debut on 24 August 2010 in a League Cup match against Hartlepool United and made his League debut four days later against Tottenham Hotspur. He was named Wigan's player of the season for the 2010–11 season.

=== Wigan Athletic ===
On 4 July 2011 Al-Habsi joined the club permanently, signing a four-year contract for an estimated £4 million transfer fee from Bolton. Al-Habsi established himself as an outstanding penalty saver, saving approximately 50% of all the penalties he faced since joining Wigan. Robin van Persie, Carlos Tevez, Javier Hernández and Mikel Arteta are among the penalty takers Al-Habsi has stopped. This earned him links to Liverpool and Arsenal. During the back end of the 2012–13 season, Al-Habsi was dropped to the bench as his position as Wigan's number one was threatened by the arrival of the athletic, young Spaniard Joel Robles on loan. Al-Habsi started Wigan's FA Cup semi-final win over Millwall but was on the bench for the final itself. Shortly after the final Wigan were relegated back to the championship.

=== Brighton & Hove Albion (loan) ===
On 31 October 2014, Al-Habsi signed for fellow Championship side Brighton & Hove Albion on a one-month loan. After playing only one game for the club, Al-Habsi returned to his parent club Wigan.

=== Reading ===
Following his release from Wigan Athletic, Al-Habsi went on trial with Reading in July 2015. This ended in Al-Habsi signing a two-year contract with the club on 14 July 2015. On 5 January 2017, Al-Habsi extended his contract with Reading until the end of the 2018–19 season.

On 17 March 2017, Al-Habsi made several crucial saves in a 2–0 victory against playoff rivals Sheffield Wednesday. This performance and others throughout the season saw Al-Habsi named in the EFL Championship team of the season and awarded the Reading player of the season award.

=== Al-Hilal ===
On 17 July 2017, Al-Habsi moved to Al-Hilal for an undisclosed fee, signing a three-year contract.

=== West Bromwich Albion ===
On 29 August 2019, Al-Habsi moved to Championship side West Bromwich Albion on a free transfer, signing a deal until the end of the season with the West Midlands club. Al-Habsi was released by the club in June 2020 without having made an appearance for the club. West Brom manager Slaven Bilić stated that he had been keen to extend Al-Habsi's contract until the end of the delayed 2019–20 season, but this was not pursued as he had returned to his native Oman and would have to undertake a two-week quarantine period before rejoining the squad.

=== Retirement ===
On 21 August 2020, Al-Habsi announced his retirement.

== International career ==
Al-Habsi began playing in his native country Oman at the age of seventeen, and joined the ranks of the Oman under-19s squad, before he was spotted by John Burridge in 2001. Due to the difficulty of securing a work permit, he was unable to move to Europe at this early stage of his career.

He was called up for Oman, and played in all of their three group matches at the 2004 AFC Asian Cup in China and also made four appearances for the team in their qualifying campaign for the 2006 FIFA World Cup, which they exited in the first group stage after finishing second in a group with Japan, India and Singapore. He was also Oman's first-choice goalkeeper at the 2007 AFC Asian Cup, appearing in all of their three group matches.

Al-Habsi also has appeared as main keeper in four consecutive Arabian Gulf Cups. In each tournament he earned the award for best goalkeeper, most recently at the 19th Arabian Gulf Cup. He kept a clean sheet throughout the 2009 tournament that Oman eventually won. He earned his 100th cap with Oman in a 0–4 loss to Australia in 2015 AFC Asian Cup.

On 5 January 2020, Al-Habsi announced his retirement from international football.

== Personal life ==
Al-Habsi is a practising Muslim and has said that his faith plays a big part in his life. He is married and has three daughters.

After finishing high school, he was a fireman in the Seeb International Airport in Muscat. In an interview with Al-Jazeera Sports, Al-Habsi accredited his previous profession with teaching him patience, hard work and patriotism. In another interview with AMF, he says that if he had not played professional football, he would have most likely continued with being a fireman.

Al-Habsi is the co-founder of Safety First, a non-profit road safety organisation in Oman that seeks to decrease car accident fatalities in the country.

== Career statistics ==
=== Club ===
Appearances and goals by club, season and competition
Club	Season	League			National cup (Note: Includes Norwegian Football Cup, FA Cup, King Cup)		League cup (Note: Includes Football League Cup/EFL Cup)		Continental		Other		Total	
Club	Season	Division	Apps	Goals	Apps	Goals	Apps	Goals	Apps	Goals	Apps	Goals	Apps	Goals
Lyn	2003	Tippeligaen	13	0	3	0	–		2	0	–		18	0
Lyn	2004	Tippeligaen	24	0	4	0	–		–		–		28	0
Lyn	2005	Tippeligaen	25	0	2	0	–		–		–		27	0
Lyn	Total		62	0	9	0	–		2	0	–		73	0
Bolton Wanderers	2005–06	Premier League	0	0	0	0	0	0	0	0	–		0	0
Bolton Wanderers	2006–07	Premier League	0	0	0	0	0	0	–		–		0	0
Bolton Wanderers	2007–08	Premier League	10	0	1	0	1	0	4 (Note: Appearances in UEFA Cup)	0	–		16	0
Bolton Wanderers	2008–09	Premier League	0	0	0	0	0	0	–		–		0	0
Bolton Wanderers	2009–10	Premier League	0	0	1	0	1	0	–		–		2	0
Bolton Wanderers	2010–11	Premier League	0	0	0	0	0	0	–		–		0	0
Bolton Wanderers	Total		10	0	2	0	2	0	4	0	–		18	0
Wigan Athletic (loan)	2010–11	Premier League	34	0	2	0	4	0	–		–		40	0
Wigan Athletic	2011–12	Premier League	38	0	1	0	1	0	–		–		40	0
Wigan Athletic	2012–13	Premier League	29	0	2	0	3	0	–		–		34	0
Wigan Athletic	2013–14	Championship	24	0	4	0	0	0	–		0	0	28	0
Wigan Athletic	2014–15	Championship	11	0	1	0	1	0	–		–		13	0
Wigan Athletic	Total		136	0	10	0	9	0	–		0	0	155	0
Brighton & Hove Albion (loan)	2014–15	Championship	1	0	0	0	0	0	–		–		1	0
Reading	2015–16	Championship	32	0	5	0	3	0	–		–		40	0
Reading	2016–17	Championship	46	0	1	0	1	0	–		3 (Note: Appearances in Championship play-offs)	0	51	0
Reading	Total		78	0	6	0	4	0	–		3	0	91	0
Al-Hilal	2017–18	Saudi Pro League	13	0	1	0	–		4 (Note: Appearances in AFC Champions League)	0	0	0	18	0
Al-Hilal	2018–19	Saudi Pro League	21	0	2	0	—		—		1 (Note: Appearance in Saudi Super Cup)	0	24	0
Al-Hilal	Total		34	0	3	0	—		4	0	1	0	42	0
West Bromwich Albion	2019–20	Premier League	0	0	0	0	0	0	—		—		0	0
Career total			321	0	30	0	15	0	10	0	4	0	380	0

=== International ===
Appearances and goals by national team and year
National team	Year	Apps	Goals
Oman	2001	2	0
Oman	2002	1	0
Oman	2003	11	0
Oman	2004	19	0
Oman	2005	0	0
Oman	2006	5	0
Oman	2007	14	0
Oman	2008	11	0
Oman	2009	13	0
Oman	2010	6	0
Oman	2011	8	0
Oman	2012	9	0
Oman	2013	3	0
Oman	2014	10	0
Oman	2015	13	0
Oman	2016	2	0
Oman	2017	4	0
Oman	2018	3	0
Oman	2019	2	0
Total		136	0

== Honours ==
Lyn Oslo

- Norwegian Football Cup runner-up: 2004

Wigan Athletic

- FA Cup: 2012–13

Al Hilal

- Saudi Pro League: 2017–18
- Saudi Super Cup: 2018

Oman

- Arabian Gulf Cup: 2009; runner-up: 2004, 2007

Individual

- Best Goalkeeper of the Gulf Cup: 2003, 2004, 2007, 2009, 2011
- Arab Goalkeeper of the Year: 2004
- Norwegian Goalkeeper of the Year: 2004
- Wigan Athletic Player of the Year: 2010–11
- Nominated for the Best at Sport award at the British Muslim Awards: 2015
- Reading FC Player of the Year: 2015–16, 2016–17

== See also ==
- List of footballers with 100 or more caps
