= 2009–10 Bolton Wanderers F.C. season =

Bolton Wanderers
2009–10 season
- Chairman: Phil Gartside
- Manager: Gary Megson (until 30 December 2009); Chris Evans and Steve Wigley (caretakers from 30 December to 8 January); Owen Coyle (from 8 January)
- Stadium: Reebok Stadium
- Premier League: 14th
- League Cup: 4th round
- FA Cup: 5th round
- Top goalscorer: League: Matthew Taylor; Ivan Klasnić (8); All: Kevin Davies (9)
- Highest home attendance: 25,370 v Manchester United, 27 March 2010
- Lowest home attendance: 8,050 v West Ham United, 22 September 2009
- Average home league attendance: 20,125
Home colours	Away colours

The 2009–10 season was Bolton Wanderers 11th season in the Premier League, and their ninth consecutive season in the top division of English football and covers the period from 1 July 2009 to 30 June 2010. Bolton Wanderers failed to win the 2009–10 Premier League title, making it the 71st time that they have competed at the top level without winning the title, the most of any club.

The team kit for the 2009–10 season was produced by Reebok who were replaced as shirt sponsor by 188BET after nineteen years. Reebok still held naming rights to the stadium. To reflect the change in sponsor the home kit was changed to an all-white body with black vertical lines nearer the bottom. The away kit was the same as the home but blue, whilst the 188bet logo was white.

== Pre-season ==
Bolton confirmed that they would not be taking up the option of signing Ebi Smolarek, Sébastien Puygrenier or Ariza Makukula after the end of the previous season, and all returned to their parent clubs.

Bolton announced on 6 May 2009 that long serving goalkeeper Jussi Jääskeläinen had been granted a testimonial against Hibernian at the Reebok Stadium on 8 August. This was later followed by an announcement that the club would play Hibs' neighbours Hearts at Tynecastle four days earlier. On 12 June, the club published its full set of pre-season fixtures which included a three-game tour of Germany and the Netherlands, where the team met Borussia Mönchengladbach, Den Bosch and FC Eindhoven. Local fixtures were organised against Leigh Genesis, Altrincham, Fleetwood Town and Chorley.

The first team finished its pre-season unbeaten, drawing all their games with the exception of Den Bosch, which they won 2–1, with Sam Ricketts and Kevin Davies scoring. The younger players did not do as well, the game against Leigh Genesis, where the new away kit was revealed, being their only victory.

== Full season ==
Bolton's Premier League season did not get off to the best of starts, a 0–1 home defeat to Sunderland. This was followed by a similar reverse away to Hull City. This immediately put pressure on manager Gary Megson, with some fans chanting for his resignation during Bolton's 1–0 League Cup victory at Tranmere Rovers three days later. Bolton went into the international break on the back of a 2–3 defeat to Liverpool, Sean Davis being sent off with Bolton leading 2–1. This would prove to be Davis' last game of the season after an operation on his articular cartilage.

The international break appeared to do the team some good as they went on a five-game unbeaten run, lasting until the next international break. A last-minute Gary Cahill goal saw Portsmouth fall in a 3–2 victory at Fratton Park, and a week later another last-minute goal, this time a penalty converted by Matt Taylor, salvaged a point at home to Stoke City. Another late goal, this time from captain Kevin Davies, took Bolton's third round League Cup tie against West Ham United into extra time, from which Bolton prevailed 3–1, and yet another late goal, time from Lee Chung-yong, gave Bolton a 2–1 victory at Birmingham City, pushing Bolton up to 13th place. The team returned from the fortnight's break to suffer a narrow defeat to Manchester United at Old Trafford, Matt Taylor scoring in a 2–1 defeat which saw Zat Knight score an own goal. The club, however, bounced back a week later to defeat Everton 3–2 at Reebok Stadium, with Ivan Klasnić scoring the winner, his first goal for the club, after having been knocked unconscious minutes earlier. This, however, was Bolton's last win for seven games as they went on a run that included two successive 4–0 defeats to Chelsea, the first away in the League Cup, the second at home three days later with Zat Knight scoring another own goal. A 5–1 defeat at Aston Villa followed before a 0–2 home defeat to local rivals Blackburn Rovers, who had not managed to collect an away point all season before the game and whose manager, the former Bolton manager Sam Allardyce, was incapacitated due to an impending heart operation. This run off defeats was halted after a 1–1 draw at Fulham but a 2–1 loss to fellow strugglers Wolverhampton Wanderers led to renewed pressure on the manager and calls for him to be replaced.

This, however, was the team's last defeat of the calendar year, a 3–3 draw at home against big spending Manchester City being followed with a 3–1 home victory against West Ham, which again lifted Bolton out of the relegation places. A chance to move further away from the bottom three was curtailed by the postponement of the last game before Christmas at Wigan Athletic. The Christmas programme started with a 1–1 draw at Lancashire rivals Burnley, managed by Bolton's former striker Owen Coyle, before former Bolton player and assistant manager Phil Brown brought his Hull side to the Reebok. The game ended in a 2–2 draw after Bolton had led 2–0, the home fans loudly booing the decision to replace goalscorer Ivan Klasnić with Gavin McCann while leading 2–1. The following morning, it was announced that manager Gary Megson had been relieved of his duties, with assistant manager Chris Evans and head coach Steve Wigley put in temporary charge.

Various names were mentioned when it came to replacing Megson, who called his dismissal "galling", with ex-Bolton players Peter Reid and Gary Speed mentioned as manager and assistant to Alan Shearer respectively, as well as Darren Ferguson and Alan Curbishley. Two people who ruled themselves out of the running were Mark Hughes and Owen Coyle. In the meantime, the club safely came through its FA Cup third round tie at home to Lincoln City, winning 4–0. Despite earlier seeming to rule himself out of the job, however, Coyle quickly became the favourite to take the job and within three days of the FA Cup game, Burnley confirmed that their manager wanted to leave and join his former club. On 8 January 2010, it was announced that, after the clubs had agreed compensation, Coyle had been appointed manager of Bolton on a two-and-a-half-year deal. With Bolton's weekend game at Sunderland being postponed due to the weather, this meant that Coyle's first two games were due to be against Arsenal, home and away, losing the first 2–0 and the return 4–2. On Coyle's appointment, both Wigley and reserve team coach Alan Cork left the club on 10 January, with Evans following them out of the club two days later.

Coyle's first win in charge came in the FA Cup fourth round with a 2–0 defeat of Sheffield United and his first win in the Premier League was a 1–0 defeat of his former club Burnley, during which he was subjected to abuse from the away fans. January finished with a 2–0 away defeat at Liverpool. The January transfer window saw Bolton loan Vladimír Weiss from Manchester City and Jack Wilshere from Arsenal, as well as bringing in American international Stuart Holden on a free transfer, all until the end of the season, while the club loaned out Nicky Hunt to Derby County, Tope Obadeyi to Rochdale and Mark Connolly to St Johnstone, all again until the end of the season. Meanwhile, Ricardo Vaz Tê refused a loan deal to Hamilton Academical.

February started with a 0–0 draw at home to Fulham after which it was confirmed that Gary Cahill had suffered a blood clot in his arm and could be out for the rest of the season. Cahill, however, returned to the side in mid-March. In Cahill's absence, the team did not win a game until the end of February, going down 2–0 at Manchester City and 3–0 at Blackburn while drawing 0–0 at Wigan Athletic. They were also knocked out of the FA Cup by Tottenham Hotspur when, after a 1–1 draw at the Reebok, Spurs won the replay 4–0. Bolton recorded their first win in a month on 27 February with a 1–0 win over Wolves, during which Zat Knight scored his first goal for the club. March began with Bolton securing a second successive win for the first and only time in the season, winning at West Ham 2–1, before the run immediately came to an end with a 4–0 reversal at Sunderland. Bolton then beat Wigan by the same score with Fabrice Muamba scoring his first goal for the club.

Bolton then went on another poor run with four successive defeats to Everton, Manchester United, Aston Villa and Chelsea, failing to score in the process. This lasted until the 85th minute of the following game at Stoke before Matt Taylor scored two quick goals in a 2–1 win. A point from the next game against already relegated Portsmouth all but ensured Bolton's participation in the following season's top flight and although they lost to Spurs the following week, results in other games made sure. Bolton finished the season with a 2–1 home win against Birmingham.

After the final game of the season, it was announced that Lee Chung-yong has been awarded the club's Player of the Year as well as the Players' Player of the Year and Newcomer of the Year. The following day, when the club released the names of those that would be leaving the club, the two highest profile names were Ricardo Vaz Tê, who had been at the club since 2003, and Zoltán Harsányi, who had been there for three years.

=== Pre-season ===
21 July 2009	Leigh Genesis	1–4	Bolton Wanderers	Leigh Sports Village
19:45 BST	Thompson 58'	Report	Harsányi 5'; Obadeyi 14', 78'; Ward 42'	Attendance: 1,105

25 July 2009	Borussia Mönchengladbach	1–1	Bolton Wanderers	Borussia-Park
15:00 BST	Bobadilla 75'	Report	McCann 26'	Attendance: 17,141

25 July 2009	Altrincham	3–3	Bolton Wanderers	Moss Lane
15:00 BST	Obadeyi 43' (o.g.); Heffernan 56'; Young 84'	Report	Ward 45'; Obadeyi 55'; Michael 73'	Attendance: 397

28 July 2009	Den Bosch	1–2	Bolton Wanderers	De Vliert
19:00 BST	Caracciolo 80'	Report	Ricketts 28'; K.Davies 57'	Attendance: 2,050

31 July 2009	FC Eindhoven	2–2	Bolton Wanderers	Jan Louwers Stadion
19:30 BST	Kurbegovic 14'; Van Boekel 88'	Report	K. Davies 44'; Cohen 79'	Attendance: 2,050

3 August 2009	Fleetwood Town	2–0	Bolton Wanderers	Highbury Stadium
19:45 BST	Warlow 5'; Dodgson 73'	Report		Attendance: 808

4 August 2009	Hearts	1–1	Bolton Wanderers	Tynecastle Stadium
19:30 BST	Nadé 57'	Report	Muamba 53'

8 August 2009	Bolton Wanderers	0–0	Hibernian	Reebok Stadium
15:00 BST		Report

9 August 2009	Chorley	2–3	Bolton Wanderers	Victory Park
13:00 BST	Rogers 81'; Fearns 86'	Report	Campbell 25'; Sheridan 33' (pen.); Harsányi 79'	Attendance: 452; Referee: Dean Mohareb

=== Premier League ===
==== Results by matchday ====
Matchday	1	2	3	4	5	6	7	8	9	10	11	12	13	14	15	16	17	18	19	20	21	22	23	24	25	26	27	28	29	30	31	32	33	34	35	36	37	38
Ground	H	A	H	A	H	A	H	A	H	H	A	H	A	A	H	H	A	A	H	H	A	H	A	H	A	A	H	A	A	H	A	H	H	A	A	H	A	H
Result	L	L	L	W	D	W	D	L	W	L	L	L	D	L	D	W	D	D	D	L	L	W	L	D	L	L	W	W	L	W	L	L	L	L	W	D	L	W
Position	14	17	19	19	17	15	14	15	13	15	16	18	18	19	19	17	17	18	16	19	19	16	16	18	19	19	16	14	14	14	14	15	15	15	14	14	14	14

Source: Statto.com
A = Away; H = Home; W = Win; D = Draw; L = Loss

15 August 2009	Bolton Wanderers	0–1	Sunderland	Reebok Stadium
15:00 BST		Report	Bent 5'	Attendance: 22,247; Referee: Andre Marriner

22 August 2009	Hull City	1–0	Bolton Wanderers	KC Stadium
15:00 BST	Ghilas 61'	Report		Attendance: 22,999; Referee: Mike Jones

29 August 2009	Bolton Wanderers	2–3	Liverpool	Reebok Stadium
15:00 BST	K. Davies 33'; Cohen 47'	Report	Johnson 41'; Torres 56'; Gerrard 83'	Attendance: 23,284; Referee: Alan Wiley

12 September 2009	Portsmouth	2–3	Bolton Wanderers	Fratton Park
15:00 BST	Kaboul 25'; Boateng 63'	Report	Cohen 13'; Taylor 41' (pen.); Cahill 89'	Attendance: 17,564; Referee: Chris Foy

19 September 2009	Bolton Wanderers	1–1	Stoke City	Reebok Stadium
15:00 BST	Taylor 89' (pen.)	Report	Kitson 53'	Attendance: 20,265; Referee: Mark Clattenburg

26 September 2009	Birmingham City	1–2	Bolton Wanderers	St Andrew's
15:00 BST	Phillips 84'	Report	Cohen 10'; Lee 86'	Attendance: 28,671; Referee: Steve Bennett

3 October 2009	Bolton Wanderers	2–2	Tottenham Hotspur	Reebok Stadium
15:00 BST	Gardner 4'; K. Davies 69'	Report	Kranjčar 34'; Ćorluka 73'	Attendance: 21,305; Referee: Mike Jones

17 October 2009	Manchester United	2–1	Bolton Wanderers	Old Trafford
15:00 BST	Knight 5' (o.g.); Valencia 33'	Report	Taylor 75'	Attendance: 75,103; Referee: Mark Clattenburg

25 October 2009	Bolton Wanderers	3–2	Everton	Reebok Stadium
13:30 GMT	Lee 16'; Cahill 27'; Klasnić 86'	Report	Saha 32'; Fellaini 55'	Attendance: 21,547; Referee: Phil Dowd

31 October 2009	Bolton Wanderers	0–4	Chelsea	Reebok Stadium
15:00 GMT		Report	Lampard 45+2' (pen.); Deco 61'; Knight 82' (o.g.); Drogba 90'	Attendance: 22,680; Referee: Peter Walton

7 November 2009	Aston Villa	5–1	Bolton Wanderers	Villa Park
15:00 GMT	A. Young 5'; Agbonlahor 43'; Carew 53'; Milner 72'; Cuéllar 75'	Report	Elmander 45'	Attendance: 38,101; Referee: Mark Clattenburg

22 November 2009	Bolton Wanderers	0–2	Blackburn Rovers	Reebok Stadium
13:30 GMT		Report	Dunn 32'; Ricketts 73' (o.g.)	Attendance: 21,777; Referee: Mike Dean

28 November 2009	Fulham	1–1	Bolton Wanderers	Craven Cottage
15:00 GMT	Duff 75'	Report	Klasnić 35'	Attendance: 23,554; Referee: Steve Bennett

5 December 2009	Wolverhampton Wanderers	2–1	Bolton Wanderers	Molineux Stadium
15:00 GMT	Craddock 3'; Milijaš 63'	Report	Elmander 79'	Attendance: 27,362; Referee: Chris Foy

12 December 2009	Bolton Wanderers	3–3	Manchester City	Reebok Stadium
15:00 GMT	Klasnić 11', 53'; Cahill 43'	Report	Tevez 28', 77'; Richards 45+2'	Attendance: 22,735; Referee: Mark Clattenburg

15 December 2009	Bolton Wanderers	3–1	West Ham United	Reebok Stadium
20:00 GMT	Lee 64'; Klasnić 77'; Cahill 88'	Report	Diamanti 69'	Attendance: 17,849; Referee: Andre Marriner

26 December 2009	Burnley	1–1	Bolton Wanderers	Turf Moor
14:00 GMT	Nugent 56'	Report	Taylor 29'	Attendance: 21,761; Referee: Chris Foy

29 December 2009	Bolton Wanderers	2–2	Hull City	Reebok Stadium
20:00 GMT	Klasnić 20'; K. Davies 61'	Report	Hunt 71', 78'	Attendance: 20,696; Referee: Phil Dowd

17 January 2010	Bolton Wanderers	0–2	Arsenal	Reebok Stadium
16:00 GMT		Report	Fàbregas 28'; Mérida 78'	Attendance: 23,893; Referee: Phil Dowd

20 January 2010	Arsenal	4–2	Bolton Wanderers	Emirates Stadium
19:45 GMT	Rosický 43'; Fàbregas 52'; Vermaelen 65'; Arshavin 85'	Report	Cahill 7'; Taylor 28' (pen.)	Attendance: 59,084; Referee: Alan Wiley

26 January 2010	Bolton Wanderers	1–0	Burnley	Reebok Stadium
20:00 GMT	Lee 35'	Report		Attendance: 23,986; Referee: Martin Atkinson

30 January 2010	Liverpool	2–0	Bolton Wanderers	Anfield
15:00 GMT	Kuyt 37'; K. Davies 70' (o.g.)	Report		Attendance: 43,413; Referee: Steve Bennett

6 February 2010	Bolton Wanderers	0–0	Fulham	Reebok Stadium
15:00 GMT		Report		Attendance: 22,289; Referee: Mark Clattenburg

9 February 2010	Manchester City	2–0	Bolton Wanderers	City of Manchester Stadium
19:45 GMT	Tevez 31' (pen.); Adebayor 73'	Report		Attendance: 42,016; Referee: Mike Jones

17 February 2010	Wigan Athletic	0–0	Bolton Wanderers	DW Stadium
20:00 GMT		Report		Attendance: 18,089; Referee: Howard Webb

20 February 2010	Blackburn Rovers	3–0	Bolton Wanderers	Ewood Park
12:00 GMT	Kalinić 41'; Roberts 73'; Givet 84'	Report		Attendance: 23,888; Referee: Chris Foy(Lee Probert)

27 February 2010	Bolton Wanderers	1–0	Wolverhampton Wanderers	Reebok Stadium
15:00 GMT	Knight 45+1'	Report		Attendance: 21,261; Referee: Andre Marriner

6 March 2010	West Ham United	1–2	Bolton Wanderers	Boleyn Ground
15:00 GMT	Diamanti 88'	Report	K. Davies 10'; Wilshere 16'	Attendance: 33,824; Referee: Lee Probert

9 March 2010	Sunderland	4–0	Bolton Wanderers	Stadium of Light
19:45 GMT	Campbell 1'; Bent 64', 74' (pen.), 88'	Report		Attendance: 36,087; Referee: Steve Bennett

13 March 2010	Bolton Wanderers	4–0	Wigan Athletic	Reebok Stadium
15:00 GMT	Elmander 10'; K. Davies 48' (pen.); Muamba 53'; Taylor 69'	Report		Attendance: 20,053; Referee: Mike Dean

20 March 2010	Everton	2–0	Bolton Wanderers	Goodison Park
15:00 GMT	Arteta 72'; Pienaar 89'	Report		Attendance: 36,503; Referee: Alan Wiley

27 March 2010	Bolton Wanderers	0–4	Manchester United	Reebok Stadium
17:30 GMT		Report	Samuel 38' (o.g.); Berbatov 69', 78'; Gibson 82'	Attendance: 25,370; Referee: Martin Atkinson

3 April 2010	Bolton Wanderers	0–1	Aston Villa	Reebok Stadium
15:00 BST		Report	A. Young 11'	Attendance: 21,111; Referee: Mike Jones

13 April 2010	Chelsea	1–0	Bolton Wanderers	Stamford Bridge
20:00 BST	Anelka 43'	Report		Attendance: 40,539; Referee: Lee Probert

17 April 2010	Stoke City	1–2	Bolton Wanderers	Britannia Stadium
15:00 BST	Kitson 13'	Report	Taylor 85', 88'	Attendance: 27,250; Referee: Stuart Attwell

24 April 2010	Bolton Wanderers	2–2	Portsmouth	Reebok Stadium
15:00 BST	Klasnić 26'; K. Davies 28'	Report	Dindane 54', 68'	Attendance: 20,526; Referee: Howard Webb

1 May 2010	Tottenham Hotspur	1–0	Bolton Wanderers	White Hart Lane
15:00 BST	Huddlestone 38'	Report		Attendance: 35,852; Referee: Chris Foy

9 May 2010	Bolton Wanderers	2–1	Birmingham City	Reebok Stadium
16:00 BST	K. Davies 33'; Klasnić 60'	Report	McFadden 77'	Attendance: 22,863; Referee: Kevin Friend

=== Table ===
Pos	Team	Pld	W	D	L	GF	GA	GD	Pts
12	Fulham	38	12	10	16	39	46	−7	46
13	Sunderland	38	11	11	16	48	56	−8	44
14	Bolton Wanderers	38	10	9	19	42	67	−25	39
15	Wolverhampton Wanderers	38	9	11	18	32	56	−24	38
16	Wigan Athletic	38	9	9	20	37	79	−42	36

Source: Premier League

=== FA Cup ===
2 January 2010 R3	Bolton Wanderers	4–0	Lincoln City	Reebok Stadium
15:00 GMT	Swaibu 49' (o.g.); Lee 51'; Cahill 83'; M. Davies 90+3'	Report		Attendance: 11,193; Referee: Michael Oliver

23 January 2010 R4	Bolton Wanderers	2–0	Sheffield United	Reebok Stadium
15:00 GMT	Steinsson 48'; Elmander 84'	Report		Attendance: 14,572; Referee: Andre Marriner

14 February 2010 R5	Bolton Wanderers	1–1	Tottenham Hotspur	Reebok Stadium
13:30 GMT	K. Davies 34'	Report	Defoe 61'	Attendance: 13,596; Referee: Phil Dowd

24 February 2010 R5 Replay	Tottenham Hotspur	4–0	Bolton Wanderers	White Hart Lane
20:00 GMT	Pavlyuchenko 23', 87'; Jääskeläinen 35' (o.g.); A. O'Brien 47' (o.g.)	Report		Attendance: 31,436; Referee: Peter Walton

=== League Cup ===
25 August 2009 R2	Tranmere Rovers	0–1	Bolton Wanderers	Prenton Park
20:00 BST		Report	M. Davies 41'	Attendance: 5,381; Referee: Nigel Miller

22 September 2009 R3	Bolton Wanderers	3 – 1 a.e.t.	West Ham United	Reebok Stadium
20:00 BST	K. Davies 86'; Cahill 96'; Elmander 119'	Report	Ilunga 59'	Attendance: 8,050; Referee: Howard Webb

28 October 2009 R4	Chelsea	4–0	Bolton Wanderers	Stamford Bridge
20:00 BST	Kalou 15'; Malouda 26'; Deco 67'; Drogba 89'	Report		Attendance: 41,538; Referee: Andre Marriner

== Squad statistics ==
No.	Pos.	Name	League		FA Cup		League Cup		Total		Discipline	
No.	Pos.	Name	Apps	Goals	Apps	Goals	Apps	Goals	Apps	Goals	Yellow card	Red card
1	GK	(Hungary) Ádám Bogdán	0	0	0	0	0	0	0	0	0	0
2	DF	(England) Nicky Hunt	0	0	0	0	0	0	0	0	0	0
3	DF	(Trinidad and Tobago) Jlloyd Samuel	13	0	0	0	0	0	13	0	4	1
4	DF	(England) Paul Robinson	25	0	2	0	0	0	27	0	7	0
5	DF	(England) Gary Cahill	29	5	2	1	3	1	34	7	3	0
6	MF	(England) Fabrice Muamba	36	1	4	0	3	0	43	1	11	0
7	MF	(England) Matt Taylor	37	8	3	0	3	0	43	8	3	0
8	MF	(Republic of Ireland) Joey O'Brien	0	0	0	0	0	0	0	0	0	0
9	FW	(Sweden) Johan Elmander	25	3	4	1	3	1	32	5	2	0
10	MF	(Netherlands) Riga Mustapha	1	0	2	0	0	0	3	0	0	0
11	MF	(Jamaica) Ricardo Gardner	20	1	3	0	1	0	24	1	1	0
12	DF	(England) Zat Knight	35	1	3	0	3	0	41	1	2	0
14	FW	(England) Kevin Davies	37	7	3	1	2	1	42	9	10	0
15	DF	(Iceland) Grétar Steinsson	27	0	3	1	1	0	31	1	4	1
16	MF	(England) Mark Davies	17	0	2	1	2	1	21	2	0	0
17	FW	(Croatia) Ivan Klasnić	27	8	3	0	2	0	32	8	4	0
18	DF	(Wales) Sam Ricketts	27	0	3	0	3	0	33	0	3	0
19	MF	(England) Gavin McCann	11	0	0	0	2	0	13	0	4	0
20	FW	(Portugal) Ricardo Vaz Tê	0	0	0	0	0	0	0	0	0	0
21	MF	(Israel) Tamir Cohen	27	3	4	0	1	0	32	3	7	0
22	GK	(Finland) Jussi Jääskeläinen	38	0	3	0	2	0	43	0	3	0
23	MF	(England) Sean Davis	3	0	0	0	1	0	4	0	3	0
24	DF	(Nigeria) Danny Shittu	0	0	0	0	0	0	0	0	0	0
25	MF	(United States) Stuart Holden	2	0	1	0	0	0	3	0	0	0
26	GK	(Oman) Ali Al-Habsi	0	0	1	0	1	0	2	0	0	0
27	MF	(South Korea) Lee Chung-yong	34	4	4	1	2	0	40	5	4	0
29	FW	(Slovakia) Zoltán Harsányi	0	0	0	0	0	0	0	0	0	0
30	DF	(England) Chris Basham	8	0	1	0	1	0	10	0	0	0
31	DF	(Republic of Ireland) Andy O'Brien	6	0	3	0	0	0	9	0	0	0
32	MF	(England) Jack Wilshere	14	1	0	0	0	0	14	1	3	0
33	FW	(England) Danny Ward	2	0	0	0	0	0	2	0	0	0
35	FW	(England) Tope Obadeyi	0	0	0	0	0	0	0	0	0	0
40	MF	(Slovakia) Vladimír Weiss	13	0	0	0	0	0	13	0	0	0
–	–	Own goals	–	1	–	0	–	0	–	1		

Statistics accurate as of match played 9 May 2010

== Technical staff ==
Name	Role
(England) Gary Megson	Team manager (until 30 December)
(Scotland) Owen Coyle	Team manager (from 8 January)
(Wales) Chris Evans	Assistant manager / Performance Director (until 12 January); Joint caretaker manager (30 December – 8 January)
(Scotland) Sandy Stewart	Assistant manager (from 15 January)
(England) Steve Wigley	First team coach (until 10 January); Joint caretaker manager (30 December – 8 January)
(England) Steve Davis	First team coach (from 15 January)
(England) Alan Cork	Reserve team coach (until 10 January)
(England) Fred Barber	Goalkeeping coach

Name	Role
(Northern Ireland) Phil Hughes	Goalkeeping coach (from 15 January)
(Wales) Neil Edwards	Assistant Goalkeeping coach
(England) Jimmy Phillips	Academy Director
(England) Adie Stovell	Fitness coach
(England) Nick Worth	Head physiotherapist (until 17 May)
(England) Steve Foster	Physiotherapist
(England) Paul Lake	Physiotherapist
(England) Colin Harvey	Chief scout
(England) Clive Richards	Scout

== Transfers ==
=== In ===
Date	Pos.	Name	From	Fee
1 July 2009	MF	(England) Sean Davis	(England) Portsmouth	Free
25 July 2009	DF	(England) Zat Knight	(England) Aston Villa	£4,230,000
25 July 2009	MF	(Wales) Sam Ricketts	(England) Hull City	£2,160,000
14 August 2009	MF	(South Korea) Lee Chung-yong	(South Korea) FC Seoul	£2,250,000
26 January 2010	FW	(United States) Stuart Holden	(United States) Houston Dynamo	Free
29 January 2010	DF	(England) Paul Robinson	(England) West Bromwich Albion	£1,080,000

=== Out ===
Date	Pos.	Name	To	Fee
1 July 2009	MF	(Switzerland) Blerim Džemaili	(Italy) Torino	£1,800,000
1 July 2009	FW	(England) Nathan Woolfe	Released	Free
1 July 2009	MF	(England) Robert Sissons	Released	Free
1 July 2009	FW	(England) James Sinclair	(England) Gateshead	Free

=== Loan in ===
Date from	Date to	Pos.	Name	From
12 July 2009	29 January 2010	DF	(England) Paul Robinson	(England) West Bromwich Albion
1 September 2009	30 June 2010	FW	(Croatia) Ivan Klasnić	(France) Nantes
25 January 2010	30 June 2010	MF	(Slovakia) Vladimír Weiss	(England) Manchester City
29 January 2010	30 June 2010	MF	(England) Jack Wilshere	(England) Arsenal

=== Loan out ===
Date from	Date to	Pos.	Name	To
14 August 2009	17 November 2009	FW	(England) Tope Obadeyi	(England) Swindon Town
28 September 2009	28 October 2009	GK	(Hungary) Ádám Bogdán	(England) Crewe Alexandra
26 November 2009	30 June 2010	FW	(England) Danny Ward	(England) Swindon Town
7 January 2010	30 June 2010	DF	(England) Nicky Hunt	(England) Derby County
30 January 2010	30 June 2010	FW	(England) Tope Obadeyi	(England) Rochdale
1 February 2010	30 June 2010	DF	(Republic of Ireland) Mark Connolly	(Scotland) St Johnstone
