= 2008–09 Bolton Wanderers F.C. season =

Bolton Wanderers
2008–09 season
- Chairman: Phil Gartside
- Manager: Gary Megson
- Stadium: Reebok Stadium
- Premier League: 13th
- FA Cup: 3rd round
- League Cup: 2nd round
- Top goalscorer: League: Kevin Davies (12); All: Kevin Davies (12)
- Highest home attendance: 26,021 v Manchester United (17 January 2009)
- Lowest home attendance: 19,884 v Portsmouth (20 December 2008)
Home colours	Away colours

The 2008–09 season was Bolton Wanderers 10th season in the Premier League, and their eighth consecutive season in the top division of English football and covers the period from 1 July 2008 to 30 June 2009. As they failed to win the 2008–09 Premier League title it was the 70th time that they have competed at the top level without winning the title, the most of any club.

The team kit for the 2008–09 season was produced by Reebok who were also the shirt sponsor. Unlike previous seasons, the new kit did not debut in the final home game of the 07–08 season. The new home kit is predominantly white with a blue upper third going over the shoulders. The new away kit is predominantly yellow with the same style over the shoulders, this time green. Due to no other club playing in a kit similar to the away design, no third choice kit was needed.

== Pre-season ==
Bolton signed Fabrice Muamba from relegated Birmingham City for £5m and broke the club transfer fee record to sign Johan Elmander from Toulouse FC for £8.2m in a deal which saw Daniel Braaten move the other way as a makeweight. Riga Mustapha and Danny Shittu were also signed for undisclosed figures. Both Iván Campo and Stelios Giannakopoulos did not have their contracts renewed, leading Campo to write a public letter to Bolton fans on a website, expressing his regret at not being able to say goodbye to them. He would later join Ipswich Town whilst Stelios joined Hull City. Andranik Teymourian also left on a free, joining Fulham, Abdoulaye Méïté joined recently promoted West Bromwich Albion for £2m and El Hadji Diouf made good his promise that he would leave the club by joining Sunderland for £2.6m.

Bolton kicked off their pre-season programme by drawing 0–0 at local rivals Rochdale. Their next pre-season friendly, away to Tranmere Rovers was postponed due to a waterlogged pitch. A convincing 5–0 defeat of Doncaster Rovers by a mostly first team squad was followed the next day by a mostly reserve squad beating local team Chorley 2–0. Pre-season was completed by a mini-tour of Greece, drawing 1–1 against previous UEFA Cup opponents Aris Thessaloniki before losing to AEK Athens 1–0.

25 July 2008	Rochdale	0–0	Bolton Wanderers	Spotland Stadium
		Report		Attendance: 2,576; Referee: K. Hill

26 July 2008	Macclesfield Town	1–0	Bolton Wanderers	Moss Rose
	Hessey 70'	Report		Attendance: 1,023; Referee: Andre Marriner

29 July 2008	Tranmere Rovers	A – A	Bolton Wanderers	Prenton Park
		Report

1 August 2008	Doncaster Rovers	0–5	Bolton Wanderers	Keepmoat Stadium
		Report	K.Davies 5'; Elmander 11', 72'; Muamba 33'; J.O'Brien 35'

2 August 2008	Chorley	0–2	Bolton Wanderers	Victory Park
		Report	Džemaili 56'; Riga 85'	Attendance: 949

4 August 2008	Aris	1–1	Bolton Wanderers	Kleanthis Vikelidis Stadium
	Javito 90+2'	Report	McCann 81'

8 August 2008	AEK Athens	1–0	Bolton Wanderers	Olympic Stadium
	Hetemaj 19'	Report

== Premier League ==
Bolton got off to a winning start in the league opener at the Reebok Stadium against newly promoted Stoke City on 16 August, Gretar Steinsson and Kevin Davies scoring before Johan Elmander scored a debut goal in a 3–1 victory.

A week later Bolton travelled to Newcastle United but left with a 1–0 defeat. This was followed four days later by a home 2–1 Carling Cup defeat to League One side Northampton Town, a result not helped by the sending off of Gary Cahill. Bolton's first goalless draw of the season followed when West Bromwich Albion visited The Reebok.

After an international break, Bolton returned to action by facing Fulham at Craven Cottage but performed poorly in another 2–1 defeat, Kevin Davies scoring late on. Davies scored again a week later when Arsenal visited the Reebok Stadium but it was not enough in a 3–1 defeat. A third consecutive defeat came at Premier League champions Manchester United, a converted penalty, given in controversial circumstances, one of the goals in a 2–0 defeat.

Bolton's second victory of the season came in the live game at West Ham on 4 October, Gary Cahill and a thirty five-yard free kick from Matthew Taylor adding to Kevin Davies' fourth goal of the season. A week later the local derby against Blackburn brought Bolton their second goalless draw.

The first reported murmurings of discontent amongst the fans against the manager followed a 2–0 defeat at Tottenham Hotspur in Harry Redknapp's first game in charge of the home team on 26 October. and the team were jeered off after a last minute goal consigned them to another defeat on 29 October, 1–0 at home to Everton.

The pressure was eased somewhat with a 2–0 derby victory over Manchester City on 2 November, a Richard Dunne own-goal adding to Ricardo Gardner's first league goal in six years. The match marked Jussi Jääskeläinen's 400th game for the club. A second successive win followed the week after, 1–0 away at Hull City and although a 2–0 followed at home to Liverpool, two more victories away at Middlesbrough and Sunderland brought the manager his first manager of the month award in the Premier League.

Winning the award seemed to have a detrimental effect on the team as two successive defeats followed to high flying Chelsea and Aston Villa. The club's only victory of the month, 2–1 at home to Portsmouth was followed by two more defeats, a Boxing Day loss away to Liverpool and two days later at home to local rivals Wigan Athletic.

The New Year commenced with an early FA Cup defeat away to Sunderland. A week later Bolton held out for 84 minutes before losing 1–0 away at Arsenal. Another conceded late goal at home to Manchester United, this time in the 90th minute, made it four losses in a row but the run halted in the next game, a 2–2 draw away at Blackburn Rovers, now managed by former Bolton manager Sam Allardyce, although Bolton had been two goals up with half an hour left. A similar fate almost befell the team in the next home game against Tottenham Hotspur, Darren Bent scoring twice in two minutes to cancel out early goals from Sébastien Puygrenier and Kevin Davies. However, a late Davies goal gave Bolton their first win in more than a month.

The January transfer window saw three new players arrive and one player leave. Kevin Nolan, the team captain for three years, was sold to Newcastle United for £4,000,000. Kevin Davies replaced him as captain. Mark Davies arrived from Wolves for £1,200,000 and two loan signings, Puygrenier and Ariza Makukula arrived from Zenit St. Petersburg and Benfica respectively.

Due to international fixtures and the club's early departure from the FA Cup, only two games were played in February, a 3–0 away defeat to Everton and a 2–1 victory over West Ham, Bolton completing a double over the London side. Kevin Davies' goal in this game gave him his best ever goal haul for the season in league games in the top flight. He would go on to score twice more and finished the season as the club's leading marksman.

March saw four points collected, through a 1–0 victory over Newcastle United and a 1–1 draw at West Bromwich. These results bookended two successive defeats, a 2–0 away defeat to Stoke City and a 3–1 reverse to Fulham.

In April, a 4–1 win over Middlesbrough at the Reebok Stadium at the very beginning of the month would prove to be Bolton's last victory of the season. The week after, a visit to Chelsea saw Bolton recover from four goals down to almost snatch a draw, an injury time shot by Gary Cahill being cleared off the Chelsea line. A 1–0 result at Portsmouth was then followed by four successive draws stretching into May, Aston Villa, Sunderland and Hull City taking points at the Reebok whilst a local derby at Wigan Athletic. The season finished with a 1–0 derby defeat at Manchester City

=== Matches ===
==== Results by matchday ====
Matchday	1	2	3	4	5	6	7	8	9	10	11	12	13	14	15	16	17	18	19	20	21	22	23	24	25	26	27	28	29	30	31	32	33	34	35	36	37	38
Ground	H	A	H	A	H	A	A	H	A	H	H	A	H	A	A	H	A	H	A	H	A	H	A	H	A	H	H	A	H	A	H	A	A	H	A	H	H	A
Result	W	L	D	L	L	L	W	D	L	L	W	W	L	W	W	L	L	W	L	L	L	L	D	W	L	W	W	L	L	D	W	L	L	D	D	D	D	L
Position	3	9	9	14	16	17	16	15	16	19	17	10	13	12	9	9	11	9	10	11	13	14	16	12	14	12	10	11	12	12	12	12	13	13	12	13	13	13

Source: Statto.com
A = Away; H = Home; W = Win; D = Draw; L = Loss

16 August 2008	Bolton Wanderers	3–1	Stoke City	Reebok Stadium
15:00 BST	Steinsson 34'; K.Davies 41'; Elmander 45'	Report	Fuller 90+3'	Attendance: 22,717; Referee: Chris Foy

23 August 2008	Newcastle United	1–0	Bolton Wanderers	St James' Park
15:00 BST	Owen 71'	Report		Attendance: 47,711; Referee: Steve Bennett

30 August 2008	Bolton Wanderers	0–0	West Bromwich Albion	Reebok Stadium
15:00 BST		Report		Attendance: 20,387; Referee: Keith Stroud

13 September 2008	Fulham	2–1	Bolton Wanderers	Craven Cottage
15:00 BST	Gera 15'; Zamora 41'	Report	K.Davies 82'	Attendance: 23,656; Referee: Steve Tanner

20 September 2008	Bolton Wanderers	1–3	Arsenal	Reebok Stadium
17:30 BST	K.Davies 14'	Report	Eboué 26'; Bendtner 27'; Denílson 87'	Attendance: 22,694; Referee: Steve Bennett

27 September 2008	Manchester United	2–0	Bolton Wanderers	Old Trafford
15:00 BST	Ronaldo 60' (pen.); Rooney 77'	Report		Attendance: 75,484; Referee: Rob Styles

5 October 2008	West Ham United	1–3	Bolton Wanderers	Boleyn Ground
13:30 BST	Cole 69'	Report	K.Davies 30'; Cahill 34'; Taylor 86'	Attendance: 33,715; Referee: Mike Dean

18 October 2008	Bolton Wanderers	0–0	Blackburn Rovers	Reebok Stadium
15:00 BST		Report		Attendance: 24,778; Referee: Howard Webb

26 October 2008	Tottenham Hotspur	2–0	Bolton Wanderers	White Hart Lane
15:00 GMT	Pavlyuchenko 17'; Bent 76' (pen.)	Report		Attendance: 35,507; Referee: Andre Marriner

29 October 2008	Bolton Wanderers	0–1	Everton	Reebok Stadium
20:00 GMT		Report	Fellaini 90'	Attendance: 21,692; Referee: Phil Dowd

2 November 2008	Bolton Wanderers	2–0	Manchester City	Reebok Stadium
16:00 GMT	Gardner 77'; Dunne 88' (o.g.)	Report		Attendance: 21,095; Referee: Mike Riley

8 November 2008	Hull City	0–1	Bolton Wanderers	KC Stadium
15:00 GMT		Report	Taylor 50'	Attendance: 24,903; Referee: Alan Wiley

15 November 2008	Bolton Wanderers	0–2	Liverpool	Reebok Stadium
13:30 GMT		Report	Kuyt 28'; Gerrard 73'	Attendance: 24,893; Referee: Rob Styles

22 November 2008	Middlesbrough	1–3	Bolton Wanderers	Riverside Stadium
15:00 GMT	Pogatetz 77'	Report	K.Davies 8'; Taylor 10'; Elmander 78'	Attendance: 24,487; Referee: Martin Atkinson

29 November 2008	Sunderland	1–4	Bolton Wanderers	Stadium of Light
15:00 GMT	Cissé 11'	Report	Taylor 18'; Cahill 21'; Elmander 39', 55'	Attendance: 35,547; Referee: Chris Foy

6 December 2008	Bolton Wanderers	0–2	Chelsea	Reebok Stadium
15:00 GMT		Report	Anelka 9'; Deco 21'	Attendance: 22,023; Referee: Howard Webb

13 December 2008	Aston Villa	4–2	Bolton Wanderers	Villa Park
15:00 GMT	Agbonlahor 25', 67'; K.Davies 40' (o.g.); Young 78'	Report	Elmander 17'; K.Davies 86'	Attendance: 35,134; Referee: Alan Wiley

20 December 2008	Bolton Wanderers	2–1	Portsmouth	Reebok Stadium
15:00 GMT	Taylor 1'; Gardner 3'	Report	Crouch 20'	Attendance: 19,884; Referee: Martin Atkinson

26 December 2008	Liverpool	3–0	Bolton Wanderers	Anfield
15:00 GMT	Riera 26'; Keane 53', 58'	Report		Attendance: 43,548; Referee: Alan Wiley

28 December 2008	Bolton Wanderers	0–1	Wigan Athletic	Reebok Stadium
14:00 GMT		Report	Zaki 44' (pen.)	Attendance: 23,726; Referee: Phil Dowd

10 January 2009	Arsenal	1–0	Bolton Wanderers	Emirates Stadium
15:00 GMT	Bendtner 84'	Report		Attendance: 60,068; Referee: Chris Foy

17 January 2009	Bolton Wanderers	0–1	Manchester United	Reebok Stadium
15:00 GMT		Report	Berbatov 90'	Attendance: 26,021; Referee: Andre Marriner

28 January 2009	Blackburn Rovers	2–2	Bolton Wanderers	Ewood Park
20:00 GMT	Warnock 66'; McCarthy 87'	Report	Taylor 15'; K.Davies 35'	Attendance: 25,205; Referee: Mike Dean

31 January 2009	Bolton Wanderers	3–2	Tottenham Hotspur	Reebok Stadium
15:00 GMT	Puygrenier 31'; K.Davies 64', 87'	Report	Bent 73', 75'	Attendance: 21,575; Referee: Phil Dowd

7 February 2009	Everton	3–0	Bolton Wanderers	Goodison Park
15:00 GMT	Arteta 40' (pen.); Jô 49', 90+4'	Report		Attendance: 33,791; Referee: Peter Walton

21 February 2009	Bolton Wanderers	2–1	West Ham United	Reebok Stadium
15:00 GMT	Taylor 10'; K.Davies 11'	Report	Parker 66'	Attendance: 21,245; Referee: Steve Tanner

1 March 2009	Bolton Wanderers	1–0	Newcastle United	Reebok Stadium
13:00 GMT	Gardner 47'	Report		Attendance: 20,763; Referee: Alan Wiley

4 March 2009	Stoke City	2–0	Bolton Wanderers	Britannia Stadium
19:45 GMT	Beattie 14'; Fuller 73'	Report		Attendance: 26,319; Referee: Mike Dean

14 March 2009	Bolton Wanderers	1–3	Fulham	Reebok Stadium
15:00 GMT	K.Davies 45+1'	Report	Johnson 42'; S.Davies 56'; Kamara 88'	Attendance: 22,117; Referee: Rob Styles

21 March 2009	West Bromwich Albion	1–1	Bolton Wanderers	The Hawthorns
15:00 GMT	Shittu 82' (o.g.)	Report	Taylor 67'	Attendance: 25,530; Referee: Howard Webb

4 April 2009	Bolton Wanderers	4–1	Middlesbrough	Reebok Stadium
15:00 BST	K.Davies 8'; Cahill 44'; Taylor 78'; Gardner 84'	Report	O'Neil 38'	Attendance: 20,819; Referee: Alan Wiley

11 April 2009	Chelsea	4–3	Bolton Wanderers	Stamford Bridge
15:00 BST	Ballack 40'; Drogba 48', 63'; Lampard 60' (pen.)	Report	A.O'Brien 70'; Basham 74'; Taylor 78'	Attendance: 41,096; Referee: Peter Walton

18 April 2009	Portsmouth	1–0	Bolton Wanderers	Fratton Park
15:00 BST	Kanu 78'	Report		Attendance: 20,158; Referee: Phil Dowd

25 April 2009	Bolton Wanderers	1–1	Aston Villa	Reebok Stadium
15:00 BST	Cohen 60'	Report	Young 43'	Attendance: 21,709; Referee: Lee Probert

2 May 2009	Wigan Athletic	0–0	Bolton Wanderers	JJB Stadium
15:00 BST		Report		Attendance: 18,655; Referee: Mike Jones

9 May 2009	Bolton Wanderers	0–0	Sunderland	Reebok Stadium
15:00 BST		Report		Attendance: 24,005; Referee: Rob Styles

16 May 2009	Bolton Wanderers	1–1	Hull City	Reebok Stadium
15:00 BST	Steinsson 78'	Report	Fagan 47'	Attendance: 25,085; Referee: Peter Walton

24 May 2009	Manchester City	1–0	Bolton Wanderers	City of Manchester Stadium
16:00 BST	Felipe Caicedo 8'	Report		Attendance: 47,202; Referee: Mark Clattenburg

=== Table ===
Pos	Team	Pld	W	D	L	GF	GA	GD	Pts
11	Wigan Athletic	38	12	9	17	34	45	−11	45
12	Stoke City	38	12	9	17	38	55	−17	45
13	Bolton Wanderers	38	11	8	19	41	53	−12	41
14	Portsmouth	38	10	11	17	38	57	−19	41
15	Blackburn Rovers	38	10	11	17	40	60	−20	41

Source: Barclays Premier League
Rules for classification: 1) points; 2) goal difference; 3) number of goals scored.

== FA Cup ==
3 January 2009	Sunderland	2–1	Bolton Wanderers	Stadium of Light
15:00 GMT	Jones 57'; Cissé 67'	Report	Smolarek 79'	Attendance: 20,685; Referee: Steve Bennett

== League Cup ==
26 August 2008	Bolton Wanderers	1–2	Northampton Town	Reebok Stadium
20:00 BST	Nolan 82'	Report	Akinfenwa 22' (pen.), 28'	Attendance: 7,136; Referee: Graham Laws

== Squad statistics ==
No.	Pos.	Name	League		FA Cup		League Cup		Total		Discipline	
No.	Pos.	Name	Apps	Goals	Apps	Goals	Apps	Goals	Apps	Goals	Yellow card	Red card
1	GK	(Hungary) Ádám Bogdán	0	0	0	0	0	0	0	0	0	0
2	DF	(England) Nicky Hunt	0	0	0	0	0	0	0	0	1	0
3	DF	(England) Jlloyd Samuel	38	0	1	0	1	0	40	0	3	0
4	MF	(England) Kevin Nolan	20	0	1	0	1	1	22	1	10	0
5	DF	(England) Gary Cahill	32	3	1	0	0	0	33	3	1	1
6	MF	(England) Fabrice Muamba	38	0	1	0	1	0	40	0	6	0
7	MF	(England) Matthew Taylor	34	10	1	0	0	0	35	10	4	0
8	U	(Republic of Ireland) Joey O'Brien	7	0	0	0	1	0	8	0	1	0
9	FW	(Sweden) Johan Elmander	29	5	1	0	0		30	5	1	0
10	FW	(Poland) Ebi Smolarek	13	0	1	1	0	0	14	0	1	0
11	MF	(Jamaica) Ricardo Gardner	28	4	1	0	1	0	30	4	1	0
12	GK	(England) Ian Walker	0	0	0	0	0	0	0	0	0	0
14	FW	(England) Kevin Davies	38	12	1	0	1	0	40	12	4	0
15	DF	(Iceland) Grétar Steinsson	37	3	1	0	1	0	39	3	8	0
16	MF	(England) Mark Davies	10	0	0	0	0	0	0	0	3	0
17	MF	(Netherlands) Riga Mustapha	18	0	1	0	1	0	20	0	1	0
18	FW	(Iceland) Heiðar Helguson	1	0	0	0	1	0	0	0	0	0
18	DF	(France) Sébastien Puygrenier	7	1	0	0	0	0	7	1	1	0
19	MF	(England) Gavin McCann	33	0	0	0	1	0	34	0	8	1
20	FW	(Portugal) Ricardo Vaz Tê	2	0	0	0	0	0	2	0	0	0
21	FW	(Portugal) Ariza Makukula	6	0	0	0	0	0	6	0	1	0
22	GK	(Finland) Jussi Jääskeläinen	38	0	1	0	1	0	40	0	3	0
23	MF	(Switzerland) Blerim Džemaili	0	0	0	0	0	0	0	0	0	0
24	DF	(Nigeria) Danny Shittu	9	0	1	0	1	0	11	0	2	0
25	MF	(Israel) Tamir Cohen	4	1	0	0	0	0	4	0	1	0
26	GK	(Oman) Ali Al-Habsi	0	0	0	0	0	0	0	0	0	0
27	DF	(England) James Sinclair	0	0	0	0	0	0	0	0	0	0
28	DF	(Poland) Jarosław Fojut	0	0	0	0	0	0	0	0	0	0
29	FW	(Slovakia) Zoltán Harsányi	0	0	0	0	0	0	0	0	0	0
30	U	(England) Chris Basham	11	0	0	0	0	0	11	1	0	0
31	DF	(Republic of Ireland) Andy O'Brien	34	1	1	0	1	0	36	1	5	0
35	FW	(England) Tope Obadeyi	3	0	0	0	0	0	3	0	0	0
43	FW	(England) Nathan Woolfe	0	0	0	0	0	0	0	0	0	0
–	–	Own goals	–	1	–	0	–	0	–	1		

Statistics accurate as of match played 24 May 2009

== Transfers ==
=== In ===
Date	Pos.	Name	From	Fee
1 July 2008	MF	(England) Fabrice Muamba	(England) Birmingham City	£5,000,000
1 July 2008	FW	(Sweden) Johan Elmander	(France) Toulouse	near £10,000,000
28 July 2008	MF	(Netherlands) Riga Mustapha	(Spain) Levante	£360,000
6 August 2008	DF	(Nigeria) Danny Shittu	(England) Watford	£2,160,000
26 January 2009	MF	(England) Mark Davies	(England) Wolverhampton Wanderers	£540,000

=== Out ===
Date	Pos.	Name	To	Fee
1 July 2008	DF	(England) Mark Ellis	(England) Torquay United	Free
1 July 2008	FW	(United States) Johann Smith	(Canada) Toronto FC	Free
1 July 2008	MF	(Greece) Stelios Giannakopoulos	(England) Hull City	Free
1 July 2008	MF	(Spain) Iván Campo	(England) Ipswich Town	Free
1 July 2008	MF	(Iran) Andranik Teymourian	(England) Fulham	Free
1 July 2008	MF	(Norway) Daniel Braaten	(France) Toulouse	p/x
28 July 2008	MF	(Senegal) El Hadji Diouf	(England) Sunderland	£2,500,000
10 August 2008	DF	(Ivory Coast) Abdoulaye Méïté	(England) West Bromwich Albion	£2,000,000
11 December 2008	GK	(England) Ian Walker	Released	Free
2 January 2009	FW	(Iceland) Heiðar Helguson	(England) Queens Park Rangers	Undisclosed
30 January 2009	MF	(England) Kevin Nolan	(England) Newcastle United	£4,000,000
12 February 2009	DF	(Poland) Jarosław Fojut	(Poland) Śląsk Wrocław	Undisclosed

=== Loan in ===
Date from	Date to	Pos.	Name	From
29 August 2008	30 June 2009	FW	(Poland) Ebi Smolarek	(Spain) Racing de Santander
9 January 2009	30 June 2009	DF	(France) Sébastien Puygrenier	(Russia) Zenit Saint Petersburg
16 January 2009	30 June 2009	FW	(Portugal) Ariza Makukula	(England) Benfica

=== Loan out ===
Date from	Date to	Pos.	Name	To
1 September 2008	30 June 2009	MF	(Switzerland) Blerim Džemaili	(Italy) Torino
3 November 2008	31 December 2008	DF	(England) Nicky Hunt	(England) Birmingham City
13 November 2008	15 February 2009	FW	(England) Nathan Woolfe	(Wales) Wrexham
28 November 2008	1 January 2009	FW	(Iceland) Heiðar Helguson	(England) Queens Park Rangers

== Kit Profile ==
Supplier: Reebok
Sponsor(s): Reebok

Home Strip	Away Strip
