= Chris Basham =

English footballer (born 1988)

Personal information
- Full name: Christopher Paul Basham
- Date of birth: 30 May 1988 (age 38)
- Place of birth: Hebburn, England
- Height: 6 ft 3 in (1.90 m)
- Positions: Defensive midfielder; centre back

Youth career
- –2004: Newcastle United
- 2006: Bolton Wanderers

Senior career*
Years	Team	Apps	(Gls)
2006–2010	Bolton Wanderers	21	(1)
2006–2007	→ Stafford Rangers (loan)	3	(0)
2007–2008	→ Rochdale (loan)	13	(0)
2010–2014	Blackpool	94	(5)
2014–2024	Sheffield United	394	(14)
Total		526	(20)
- * Club domestic league appearances and goals

Christopher Paul Basham (born 30 May 1988) is an English former professional footballer who played as a defensive midfielder or centre-back.

Having started as a junior with Newcastle United, he played for Bolton Wanderers, as well as having loan spells at Stafford Rangers and Rochdale, prior to joining Blackpool in August 2010. In 2014, he joined Sheffield United, where he went on to spend the majority of his professional career with, and where he became best known as a pioneer of the role of the overlapping centre-back (usually on the right flank), a position he developed under manager Chris Wilder during the 2016–17 season.

== Club career ==
=== Bolton Wanderers ===
Basham was a member of the youth team at Newcastle United before being released at age sixteen. Soon after, he joined Bolton Wanderers, where he signed his first professional contract with the club, signing a two-year deal. In November 2006 Basham joined Conference National side Stafford Rangers on a month's loan, making his debut on 25 November in a 2–2 home draw with St Albans City. After four appearances for Rangers, Basham returned to Bolton when his loan deal expired.

On 7 February 2008, Basham joined League Two side Rochdale on loan until the end of the 2007–08 season. Making his debut on 12 February 2008 in a 4–2 home defeat to Hereford United, Basham went on to make a total of 13 appearances for his temporary employers, helping Rochdale to finish fifth in the league and qualify for the League Two play-offs.

The following season saw Basham make his senior debut for Bolton Wanderers as an 89th-minute substitute in the 4–1 win over Sunderland at the Stadium of Light on 29 November 2008. He scored his first goal on 11 April 2009, in a 4–3 defeat to Chelsea at Stamford Bridge, and eventually made a total of eleven appearances that season.

The following season saw Basham making his first appearance came on 29 August 2009, where he came on as a substitute in the second half, in a 3–2 loss against Liverpool, followed up by assisting a winning goal for Gary Cahill, in a 3–2 win over Portsmouth on 12 September 2009. On 6 November 2009, and after 17 appearances for the club, Basham signed a contract extension with Bolton until the summer of 2012. Remaining on the fringes of the first-team Basham made a total of eight league and two cup appearances in the 2009–10 season before an injury kept him out for the rest of the season.

=== Blackpool ===
On 6 August 2010, Bolton Wanderers turned down a bid from newly promoted Premier League side Blackpool. Eventually, Blackpool made a second bid for Basham, which was accepted by the club and the next day, on 13 August 2010, Basham signed a three-year contract with Blackpool for a fee reported to be in the region of £1million.

The following day after signing for the club, Basham made his debut as a 60th-minute substitute for Marlon Harewood as Blackpool marked their Premier League debut on the opening day of the 2010–11 season with a 4–0 win over Wigan Athletic at the DW Stadium. It wasn't until 10 November when he made his second league appearance, playing the whole game against Aston Villa in a 3–2 loss. However, Basham spent most of the season on the reserve bench or injured and at the end of the season, the club were relegated to the Championship.

After appearing in three matches at the start of the 2011–12 season, Basham suffered an injury that kept him out for a month. He was expected to be sent out on loan following his recovery, however he was recalled to the first team due to the club's injury crisis. On 10 December 2011, Basham scored his first goal for Blackpool, heading the first equaliser of a 2–2 away draw at Southampton. His second goal for the club came on 21 January 2012, in a 2–1 win over Crystal Palace. He made 21 appearances during the season in all competitions, scoring twice.

In the 2012–13 season, Basham appeared in and out of the first team at the start of the season, due to being on the sidelines and played in the reserve. By the time he suffered ankle injury in early-December, he made seven appearances. After returning from injury, Basham then scored his first Blackpool on 29 December 2012, in a 4–2 loss against Middlesbrough. As the 2012–13 season progressed, Basham remained in the first team despite suffering from injuries during a match against Leicester City that kept him out for a month and went on to finish the 2012–13 season, making 28 appearances and scoring once in all competitions. Following this, Blackpool opted to take up their option of a contract extension, keeping Basham under contract until summer 2014.

In the 2013–14 season, Basham began to establish himself in the first team and started well, helping the club go unbeaten for the first six matches to the start of the season, including scoring his first goal of the season, in a 1–1 draw against Middlesbrough on 17 August 2013. After appearing four matches throughout September, including scoring another against Leicester City, Basham's performance earned him Wonga.com Player of the Month award for September. Despite missing out on two occasions, due to injury and suspension, Basham continued to be in the first team throughout the season and went on to make 42 appearances in all competitions.

At the end of the 2013–14 season, Basham was offered a new contract by the club.

=== Sheffield United ===
On 5 June 2014, Basham signed a three-year deal with Sheffield United on a free transfer after his contract with Blackpool came to an end. Upon joining the club, Basham was given number six shirt for the new season.

Basham made his Sheffield United debut in a 2–1 loss against Bristol City in the opening game of the season, playing 86 minutes before being substituted. He became a first team regular at the club and was praised by manager Nigel Clough, playing most of the season in midfield or centre-back positions. As the 2014–15 season progressed, he continued to be in the first team unless suspended or injured. In the League One play-offs, Basham played both legs against Swindon Town and scored in the second leg, a 5–5 draw. However, this was not enough to progress, having previously lost the first leg 2–1. He finished his first season at the club making 50 appearances in all competitions (37 in the league).

In the 2015–16 season, Basham continued to be a first team regular following the arrival of manager Nigel Adkins. He captained the club for the first time against Doncaster Rovers on 26 September 2015, also scoring his first goal of the season in a 3–1 win. Basham went on to captain the team on five occasions following Jay McEveley's absence. His second goal of the season came on 28 November 2015, in a 1–1 draw against Barnsley. Basham also scored against Walsall in April. Despite missing two league matches due to injuries, he made 49 appearances in all competitions, scoring three goals.

In the 2016–17 season, Basham retained his place under manager Chris Wilder and played in midfield alongside Paul Coutts. Basham scored his first goal of the season – but was later sent off – in a 2–2 draw against Scunthorpe United on 24 September 2016. After serving a three-match league suspension, Basham returned on 18 October 2016 in a 3–0 win against Shrewsbury Town. This was followed by scoring in the next game, a 3–3 draw against Bradford City. Two weeks later, on 6 November 2016, Basham scored and registered an assist in a 6–0 win over Leyton Orient in the first round of the FA Cup. Due to his impressive performances, Wilder hinted that Basham could be earning a new contract, with a year to his current deal remaining. As the 2016–17 season progressed, Basham began to play in defence as a centre-back, alongside teammates such as Jack O'Connell, Ethan Ebanks-Landell and Jake Wright. In a 3–0 win over Port Vale on 14 April 2017, Basham produced an impressive display when he set up two goals. At the end of the season Sheffield United were crowned champions of League One, with Basham making 48 appearances and scoring three goals in all competitions.

In July 2017, Basham penned a new two-year contract with the Blades, having played a key role in United's promotion to the Championship. On 28 April 2019, Basham saw his second promotion in three seasons with United as the Blades were promoted to the Premier League.

Basham won the Player of the Year award and Players' Player of the Year award for the 2019–20 season, as he played in all 38 of the club's Premier League matches.

On 1 August 2020, Basham signed a new two-year deal at Sheffield United.

On 12 May 2022, Basham signed a new two-year deal at Sheffield United, extending his stay with the club until June 2024.

On 7 October 2023, he sustained ankle dislocation and ligament damage during a 3–1 defeat against Fulham. On 12 October, it was announced that Basham had undergone two surgeries to repair the damage caused by his ankle dislocation and accompanying ligament damage. On 29 May 2024, Sheffield United announced he would be leaving in the summer when his contract expired, ending his decade-long stay with the club. In August 2024, Basham retired from professional football at the age of 36, after failing to effectively recover from his injury.

== Personal life ==
Basham was born in Hebburn, Tyne and Wear. He grew up supporting Sunderland. Basham considers Alan Cork as a great influence and is indebted to Cork for guiding him throughout his professional football career.

Having two years away from football, after leaving Newcastle United at sixteen, Basham worked at McDonald's and enrolled at Gateshead College and trained with their Academy for Sport.

In late 2014, Basham became a father.

== Career statistics ==
Appearances and goals by club, season and competition
Club	Season	League			FA Cup		League Cup		Other		Total	
Club	Season	Division	Apps	Goals	Apps	Goals	Apps	Goals	Apps	Goals	Apps	Goals
Stafford Rangers (loan)	2006–07	Conference National	3	0	1	0	—		—		4	0
Rochdale (loan)	2007–08	League Two	13	0	—		—		—		13	0
Bolton Wanderers	2008–09	Premier League	11	1	—		—		—		11	1
Bolton Wanderers	2009–10	Premier League	8	0	1	0	1	0	—		10	0
Bolton Wanderers	Total		19	1	1	0	1	0	—		21	1
Blackpool	2010–11	Premier League	2	0	0	0	1	0	—		3	0
Blackpool	2011–12	Championship	17	2	3	0	1	0	—		21	2
Blackpool	2012–13	Championship	26	1	2	0	0	0	—		28	1
Blackpool	2013–14	Championship	40	2	1	0	1	0	—		42	2
Blackpool	Total		85	5	6	0	3	0	—		94	5
Sheffield United	2014–15	League One	37	0	5	0	4	0	4 (Note: 2 appearances in Football League Trophy, 2 appearances and 1 goal in League One play-offs)	1	50	1
Sheffield United	2015–16	League One	44	3	3	0	1	0	1 (Note: Appearance(s) in Football League Trophy)	0	49	3
Sheffield United	2016–17	League One	43	2	2	1	1	0	2 (Note: Appearances in EFL Trophy)	0	48	3
Sheffield United	2017–18	Championship	45	2	3	0	2	0	—		50	2
Sheffield United	2018–19	Championship	41	4	1	0	1	0	—		43	4
Sheffield United	2019–20	Premier League	38	0	4	0	0	0	—		42	0
Sheffield United	2020–21	Premier League	31	0	3	1	1	0	—		35	1
Sheffield United	2021–22	Championship	28	0	1	0	2	0	2 (Note: Appearances in Championship play-offs)	0	33	0
Sheffield United	2022–23	Championship	29	0	6	0	0	0	—		35	0
Sheffield United	2023–24	Premier League	8	0	0	1	0	0	—		9	0
Sheffield United	Total		344	11	28	3	12	0	9	1	394	14
Career total			464	17	36	3	16	0	9	1	526	20

== Honours ==
Sheffield United

- EFL League One: 2016–17
- EFL Championship runner-up: 2018–19, 2022–23

Individual

- Sheffield United Player of the Year: 2019–20
- Sheffield United Players' Player of the Year: 2019–20
