= Pool Hayes Academy =

Location
- Castle Drive; Willenhall, West Midlands, WV12 4QZ; England; 52°36′04″N 2°03′08″W

Information
- Type: Academy
- Local authority: Walsall
- Department for Education URN: 142594 Tables
- Ofsted: Reports
- Executive Principal: Vince Green
- Gender: Mixed
- Age: 11 to 18
- Enrolment: 1,151
- Website: http://www.poolhayes.attrust.org.uk/

Pool Hayes Academy is a mixed secondary school and sixth form located in Willenhall, in the West Midlands of England. It is one of the biggest secondary schools in the Metropolitan Borough of Walsall.

== Buildings ==
Construction of the school began in the early 1960s. Pool Hayes Farm was levelled and a nearby pool plus Pool Hayes Colliery were filled in to make way for the school. Patricks Lane was renamed 'Pool Hayes Lane' and was redeveloped in 1965. The school itself was opened in 1964 around the same time as construction of the surrounding areas (including housing), was still in progress.

During 2006 the school came under partial redevelopment. The original 40-years old wooden windows were removed and replaced by new PVC framed windows. The I.T block was also redeveloped along with the tennis court, plus automatic doors replaced the original 60s wooden ones in the reception area. The maths section was altered as part of the redevelopment, with the two original doors either side being bricked over and replaced with a main door, which faces the grassy area.

== School performance and inspection judgements ==
As of 2022, the school's most recent inspection by Ofsted was on 26 April 2022, with a judgement of Good.

== Specialist status ==
In September 2006, Pool Hayes was designated a Specialist Status as an Arts College which brought an increase in resources to support Drama, Music Technology and Creative Technology. This Specialist Status also carries with it the challenge of raising standards in those subjects throughout the school.

== Notable former pupils ==
- Mark Davies, footballer with Wolverhampton Wanderers and Bolton Wanderers.
