= Mark Davies (footballer, born 1988) =

English footballer

Personal information
- Full name: Mark Nicholas Davies
- Date of birth: 18 February 1988 (age 38)
- Place of birth: Willenhall, England
- Height: 5 ft 11 in (1.80 m)
- Position: Midfielder

Youth career
- –2005: Wolverhampton Wanderers

Senior career*
Years	Team	Apps	(Gls)
2005–2009	Wolverhampton Wanderers	27	(1)
2008–2009	→ Leicester City (loan)	7	(1)
2009–2017	Bolton Wanderers	184	(14)
Total		218	(16)

International career
2003	England U16	4	(0)
2004–2005	England U17	12	(2)
2005–2007	England U19	6	(0)
- * Club domestic league appearances and goals

Mark Nicholas Davies (born 18 February 1988) is an English former professional footballer who played as a midfielder.

== Club career ==
=== Wolverhampton Wanderers ===
Born in Willenhall, West Midlands, Davies was a former student of Pool Hayes Community School. He joined Wolverhampton Wanderers Youth Academy at the age of nine. He signed his first professional contract at Wolves in February 2005, aged 17.

In the 2005–06 season, Davies broke into the Wolves first team under then manager Glenn Hoddle, making his league debut as a substitute against Leeds United on 20 August 2005, losing the game 2–0 at Elland Road. He made his first league start for Wolves against Watford on 20 September 2005, losing the game 2–1. Davies scored his first professional league goal against Luton Town on 13 January 2006, winning the game 2–1 at Molineux. He went on to frequently feature for Wolves throughout the season, and becoming a vital member of the team, making 20 appearances for Wolves in his first season. Former Wolves Academy manager Chris Evans said Davies was the best prospect to come out the youth system since players Robbie Keane and Joleon Lescott.

The start of the 2006–07 season was a blow to Davies as he suffered a cartilage problem in pre-season. However, he returned to fitness in January 2007, making 10 substitute appearances for Wolves, and also went on to feature for the England U-19s.

In the 2007–08 season, Davies picked up a shoulder injury and other niggling injuries which kept him out for the whole season, limiting him to only a few reserve outings.

The 2008–09 season started brightly for Davies as he had a successful pre-season for Wolves. His first and final game for Wolves ended with him coming off the bench to assist and score the winning goal against Accrington Stanley in the League Cup, winning the game 3–2 at Molineux. This was Davies last appearance for Wolves as on 27 November 2008 he joined League One club Leicester City on a one-month loan deal.

In late January 2009, Davies handed in a transfer request at Wolves. Wolves did offer him a new three-and-a-half-year contract, but he declined the offer. Wolves went on to receive a bid from League One side Leicester City, for around £650,000, but this was declined by the club. Wolves then later received another bid from Premier League side Bolton Wanderers, believed to be in the region of £1m, rising to £2m, and accepted the offer, with Wolves adding a hefty sell on clause in part of the deal. Davies went on to sign for Bolton Wanderers on 26 January 2009, ending his ten-year stay with the club.

=== Loan spell at Leicester City ===
On 27 November 2008, Davies joined League One side Leicester City on a one-month loan deal in order to gain full match fitness after almost two years on the sidelines. He made his debut for Leicester as a substitute against Southend United on 6 December 2008, winning the game 3–0 at the Walkers Stadium. He made his first start for Leicester against Peterborough United on 20 December 2008, thrashing them 4–0 at the Walkers Stadium. He scored his only goal for the club against Leyton Orient on 10 January 2009, as Leicester won 3–0 at the Walkers Stadium. Davies impressed during his short loan spell, causing Leicester to extend it to 1 February 2009.

=== Bolton Wanderers ===
On 26 January 2009, Davies joined Premier League side Bolton Wanderers on a four-and-a-half-year contract, for an undisclosed fee. He extended his contract by another year on 15 February 2011. He made his debut two days after signing when he came on as a substitute in the 2–2 draw with local rivals Blackburn Rovers at Ewood Park. He made his first start for his new club three days later against Tottenham Hotspur on 31 January 2009, winning the game 3–2 at the Reebok Stadium. He scored his first goal for Bolton at the start of the 2009–10 season, in the League Cup against Tranmere Rovers on 25 August 2009, winning the game 1–0. He scored his second goal for the club in the FA Cup against Lincoln City on 2 January 2010, winning the game 4–0 at the Reebok Stadium. Davies scored his first league goal for Bolton against Blackpool on 27 November 2010, earning his side a 2–2 draw at the Reebok Stadium. This goal was voted the club's goal of the 2010–11 season at the official Player of the Year dinner, beating Johan Elmander's individual effort against Wolverhampton Wanderers.

Davies his first goal of the 2011–12 season at Blackburn Rovers on 20 December as Bolton won 2–1. His second came in a 3–1 home win against Liverpool on 21 January 2012. He also scored on 11 February in the 2–1 loss to Wigan Athletic with a half volley from twenty yards out. He scored on the final day of the 2011–12 season, 13 May, in a 2–2 draw against Stoke City but the result wasn't enough to keep Bolton in the Premier League as they needed a win to stay up.

On 23 October 2012, in a Championship match against Wolverhampton Wanderers at Molineux, Davies scored a 90th-minute equaliser against his former club with a left-foot volley from the edge of the box into the far top corner to earn Bolton a 2–2 draw.

On 27 February 2013, Davies signed a new contract with Bolton, keeping at the club until 2017. Two days later Davies was ruled out with injury for up to ten months. His return came as he came on as a late substitute against Wigan Athletic ten months later in December 2013. He missed the final two months of that season with injury, as well as all of pre season and the first month of the following season. In November 2014, Davies was again injured, this time for up to four months.

On 19 May 2017, the club confirmed that Davies would be leaving when his contract expired on 30 June. According to former teammate Robbie Blake Davies had agreed a transfer to Chelsea before his injury troubles. As of May 2020 Davies is working in property development in the Midlands.

== International career ==
=== Youth teams ===
Davies represented England U17s in the UEFA European Under-17 Football Championship in 2004. He scored two goals for his country, his first against Portugal U17s in the group stages, and his second against Portugal in the third-place play-off, drawing the game 4–4, but losing on penalties. Davies captained the England U17 team in the UEFA European Under-17 Football Championship Qualifier against Northern Ireland U17 at Molineux in March 2005. He also went on to represent the England U17s in the UEFA European Under-17 Football Championship in May 2005, but they did not make it out of the group stages.

Davies was called up to the England U21 squad to face Ecuador U21s on 16 February 2010, but had to pull out due to the ankle injury he picked up against Arsenal. On 14 March 2011, Davies received his second call up to the England Under-21s, but pulled out due to injury. He received a third call up, for the England Under-21 Championships provisional squad, but once again pulled out due to the same injury from his second call up and was replaced by Liverpool's Jay Spearing.

== Personal life ==
His younger brother Richard Davies was also a professional footballer.

== Career statistics ==
As of match played 27 August 2016.

Appearances and goals by club, season and competition
Club	Season	League			FA Cup		League Cup		Other		Total	
Club	Season	Division	Apps	Goals	Apps	Goals	Apps	Goals	Apps	Goals	Apps	Goals
Wolverhampton Wanderers	2005–06	Championship	20	1	2	0	2	0	—		24	1
Wolverhampton Wanderers	2006–07	Championship	7	0	3	0	0	0	0	0	10	0
Wolverhampton Wanderers	2008–09	Championship	0	0	0	0	1	1	—		1	1
Wolverhampton Wanderers	Total		27	1	5	0	3	1	—		35	2
Leicester City (loan)	2008–09	League One	7	1	2	0	0	0	—		9	1
Bolton Wanderers	2008–09	Premier League	10	0	0	0	0	0	—		10	0
Bolton Wanderers	2009–10	Premier League	17	0	2	1	2	1	—		21	2
Bolton Wanderers	2010–11	Premier League	24	1	5	0	2	0	—		31	1
Bolton Wanderers	2011–12	Premier League	35	4	5	0	3	0	—		43	4
Bolton Wanderers	2012–13	Championship	24	6	0	0	1	0	—		25	6
Bolton Wanderers	2013–14	Championship	18	1	0	0	0	0	—		18	1
Bolton Wanderers	2014–15	Championship	15	2	0	0	0	0	—		15	2
Bolton Wanderers	2015–16	Championship	36	0	2	0	1	0	—		39	0
Bolton Wanderers	2016–17	League One	5	0	0	0	1	0	—		6	0
Bolton Wanderers	Total		184	14	14	1	10	1	—		208	16
Career total			218	16	21	1	14	2	0	0	259	19
