= 2011–12 Bolton Wanderers F.C. season =

Bolton Wanderers
2011–12 season
- Chairman: Phil Gartside
- Manager: Owen Coyle
- Stadium: Reebok Stadium
- Premier League: 18th (relegated)
- FA Cup: 6th round
- League Cup: 4th round
- Top goalscorer: League: Ivan Klasnić (8); All: Ivan Klasnić (9)
- Highest home attendance: 26,901 v Blackburn Rovers (24 March 2012)
- Lowest home attendance: 6,777 v Macclesfield Town (24 August 2011)
- Average home league attendance: 21,414
Home colours	Away colours	Third colours

The 2011–12 season was Bolton Wanderers's thirteenth season in the Premier League, and their eleventh consecutive season in the top-flight of English football. It is their third season with shirt sponsors 188BET.

It covers the period from 1 July 2011 to 30 June 2012. As Bolton Wanderers didn't win the 2011–12 Premier League title, it is the 73rd time that they have competed at the top level without winning the title, the most of any club.

The home strip for the 2011–12 season was revealed on 12 May 2011 bearing the 188 Bet logo. The Reebok home strip has a white and blue body with a white right arm and a blue left arm. The away strip is all black with a yellow trim. Last seasons away strip was retained and used in Bolton's 2-0 loss away to Newcastle on 9 April.

At the end of the season, Bolton Wanderers finished in eighteenth place in the Premier League, meaning relegation to the following season's Football League Championship and ending their longest run in the top division for forty eight years.

== Pre-season ==
Bolton Wanderers preceded their 2011–12 campaign with a tour of the United States for the second year in a row. They originally announced games at Orlando City on 17 July, with Bolton winning the game 3–1, and against midfielder Stuart Holden's former club Houston Dynamo on 20 July, which they also won, 2–0. On 14 June they announced an extra game at FC Tampa Bay which was played on 14 July, with the home team winning 1–0. On 3 June, the club announced two initial games to be played against domestic opposition. They met Newport County on 30 July and won 3–1. However, the game was overshadowed by an injury suffered by Lee Chung-Yong who broke his leg following a challenge by Tom Miller. Initial reports suggested that Lee would miss the vast majority of the season. Two days later they beat Hereford United scoring three goals with no reply. On 7 June the club announced further games at Bradford City and a local derby at Bury. The Bradford game took place on 24 July, with Bolton winning 4–1 and the Bury game followed three days later, Bolton beating their nearest rivals 2–0. On 13 June, Bolton announced their only pre season game at the Reebok Stadium would be on 5 August against La Liga side Levante. The Spanish side won the match 1–0. This meant that Ivan Klasnić finished the pre season as the club's leading scorer with five goals. In addition to this, the reserve team also played five games away from home at non-league opposition, winning three, drawing one and losing one. Lee was not the only Bolton player to suffer a major injury in pre season, with Tyrone Mears who had only just joined the club from Burnley, also breaking his leg in a training session on 4 August.

14 July 2011	FC Tampa Bay	1–0	Bolton Wanderers	Al Lang Stadium
19:30 EDT	Clare 65'	Report

17 July 2011	Orlando City	1–3	Bolton Wanderers	Citrus Bowl
19:30 EDT	Luzunaris 28'	Report	K. Davies 18'; Pratley 36'; Petrov 39'	Attendance: 6,392

20 July 2011	Houston Dynamo	0–2	Bolton Wanderers	Robertson Stadium
19:30 EDT		Report	Klasnić 31'; K. Davies 58'	Attendance: 13,612; Referee: Alex Prus

24 July 2011	Bradford City	1–4	Bolton Wanderers	Valley Parade
15:00 BST	Rodney 71'	Report	Petrov 15' (pen.); Pratley 65'; K. Davies 87'; Klasnić 90'	Attendance: 2,349; Referee: Jon Moss

27 July 2011	Bury	0–2	Bolton Wanderers	Gigg Lane
19:45 BST		Report	Klasnić 43'; Cahill 61'	Attendance: 2,997; Referee: Craig Pawson

30 July 2011	Newport County	1–3	Bolton Wanderers	Newport Stadium
15:00 BST	Buchanan 10'	Report	Miller 14' (o.g.); Klasnić 21', 45+1'	Attendance: 2,007

1 August 2011	Hereford United	0–3	Bolton Wanderers	Edgar Street
19:30 BST		Report	Eagles 15'; Pratley 60'; K. Davies 62'	Attendance: 2,250; Referee: Peter Gibbs

5 August 2011	Bolton Wanderers	0–1	Levante	Reebok Stadium
20:00 BST		Report	Iborra 79'	Attendance: 5,172; Referee: John Moss

=== Reserves ===
16 July 2011	Chorley	0–3	Bolton Wanderers	Victory Park
15:00 BST		Report	Riley (2); Sampson	Attendance: 602

23 July 2011	Lancaster City	4–1	Bolton Wanderers	Giant Axe
15:00 BST	Johnson (2); Meaney; Clark	Report	Kellett

26 July 2011	Nantwich Town	0–2	Bolton Wanderers	The Weaver Stadium
19:30 BST		Report	Eckersley; O'Halloran

29 July 2011	Northwich Victoria	1–1	Bolton Wanderers	Victoria Stadium
BST	Short 44'	Report	Odelusi 21'

6 August 2011	York City	0–1	Bolton Wanderers	Bootham Crescent
15:00 BST		Report	O'Halloran 60'	Attendance: 1,416; Referee: Billy Khatib

== Premier League ==
The fixtures for the 2011–12 season were announced on 17 June at 09:00 BST, and revealed that Bolton will begin the season away from home for the first time in six years. Bolton travelled to Loftus Road to take on newly promoted Queens Park Rangers on 13 August 2011. Goals from Gary Cahill, Ivan Klasnić, Fabrice Muamba and an own goal from Danny Gabbidon gave Bolton a 4–0 win. This was their best season opener since the first game of the 2001–02 season. They finished the weekend in joint first place with their next opponents, Manchester City, to whom they suffered a 2–3 home defeat. Manchester City scored two first-half goals from David Silva and Gareth Barry before Ivan Klasnić pulled one back shortly before halftime from Martin Petrov's cross for his second goal of the season. Edin Džeko restored Manchester City's two-goal cushion straight after halftime before Kevin Davies pulled a goal back with a header midway through the second half from Petrov's free-kick. The Saturday after, Bolton travelled to Anfield to take on Liverpool. The home side dominated the game, and scored three goals from Jordan Henderson, Martin Škrtel and Charlie Adam before Ivan Klasnić scored a consolation goal in stoppage time.

After an international break, which saw Gary Cahill become the first Bolton player since Ray Parry in 1959 to score for England, Bolton's next home game was against the other Manchester club, Manchester United. In suffering a 0–5 loss, Bolton recorded their worst home defeat since their return to the Premier League in 2001. It was also the worst home defeat at the Reebok Stadium and the worst home defeat since Manchester United won 6–0 at Burnden Park in 1996. A Wayne Rooney hat trick and a Javier Hernández brace causing the damage. A week later there was a second successive home fixture, this time against newly promoted Norwich City. Two first half goals from Anthony Pilkington and Bradley Johnson saw the away side on their way to their first win at Bolton since 1982. A second half Martin Petrov penalty was not enough for Bolton, who also saw Ivan Klasnić sent off for a head butt on Marc Tierney. The defeat, Bolton's fifth successive at home including the previous season, saw them fall into the relegation zone just over a month after leading the league. A week later they fell to bottom with a 3–0 loss at Arsenal, two goals from Robin van Persie and a late strike from Alex Song doing the damage. For the second week in a row they also had a man sent off, David Wheater being shown red for a foul on Theo Walcott. Bolton remained bottom going into an international break with a 1–5 home loss to Chelsea. Former loanee Daniel Sturridge added two goals to a Frank Lampard hat trick. This was Chelsea's ninth straight win at the Reebok Stadium, but Bolton did finally score a goal against them at home, through Dedryck Boyata, something they hadn't managed since 2002–03. This was Bolton's worst start to a top flight season since 1902–03, when they were relegated.

Bolton returned after the international break with an away game at local rivals Wigan Athletic. A Gary Caldwell own goal was pulled back by Mohamed Diamé, but David Ngog, opening his account for Bolton, regained the lead on the stroke of half time. Kevin Davies had a second half penalty saved by former Bolton goalkeeper Ali Al-Habsi before Chris Eagles secured the win in second half injury time. However a week later their poor run at home continued with a 2–0 loss to Sunderland, late goals from Stéphane Sessègnon and Nicklas Bendtner leaving Bolton still in the relegation zone where they remained after the next game, away at Swansea City where goals scored by Joe Allen, Scott Sinclair and Danny Graham saw Bolton fall to one off the bottom. Bolton's only goal was put into his own net by Graham, whilst Ricardo Gardner was sent off for the third time in his Bolton career after receiving two yellow cards. Going into their next game at home to Stoke City, Bolton were in danger of setting a new record if they lost their sixth home game in a row from the start of the season. However an early, and contentious, Kevin Davies goal along with braces from both Chris Eagles and Ivan Klasnić gave Bolton a 5–0 win, equalling their best ever victory in the Premier League. The game also marked the league debut of Joe Riley who received a standing ovation from the fans when substituted late in the game. The scoreline was the reverse of the FA Cup Semi-final the previous March which, ironically, had been overseen by the same referee, Howard Webb. The result left Bolton just inside the relegation zone going into an international break.

Returning from the break, Bolton played West Bromwich Albion at The Hawthorns. Jerome Thomas scored first for the home side but this was quickly levelled through an Ivan Klasnić penalty. However, Shane Long won the game for West Bromwich midway through the second half, leaving Bolton still just inside the relegation zone. The week after, Bolton faced Everton at The Reebok Stadium. David Wheater was sent off midway through the first half, his second red card of the season. Second half goals from Marouane Fellaini and Apostolos Vellios gave Everton a 2–0 win and Bolton finished November still just inside the relegation zone. Bolton suffered a third successive defeat the following weekend, losing 3–0 at Tottenham Hotspur. Goals from Gareth Bale, Aaron Lennon and Jermain Defoe followed Gary Cahill's dismissal, Bolton's fifth of the season. This red card was overturned by the FA the following Tuesday after Bolton successfully appealed. The result left Bolton in nineteenth place, ahead of Wigan Athletic on goal difference only. A week later, Bolton returned to the foot of the table after a 2–1 home defeat to Aston Villa. Two first-half goals from Marc Albrighton and Stiliyan Petrov put Villa into a half time lead, before Ivan Klasnić scored his seventh goal of the season early in the second half. Before the match there was a minute's applause in memory of former player Gary Speed, who had died a fortnight earlier. This was followed by another loss, this time to Fulham at Craven Cottage. Two first-half goals, the second coming just 66 seconds after the first, from Clint Dempsey and Bryan Ruiz ensured that Bolton stayed at the bottom of the table after a 2–0 loss. With only one team in Premier League history surviving at the end of the season when being bottom at Christmas, Bolton went into the local derby at Blackburn Rovers the following Tuesday knowing that only a victory would prevent this. An early Mark Davies goal, followed by Nigel Reo-Coker's first goal for the club, and his first goal in over three years, midway through the first half took Bolton into the lead and although Yakubu pulled one back in the second halfway, Bolton leapfrogged their opponents and moved up one place. The next match was against Newcastle United on Boxing Day, where two individual mistakes led to Newcastle's goals in a 2–0 win, Hatem Ben Arfa and Demba Ba scoring. Bolton's final game of 2011 came at The Reebok against Wolverhampton Wanderers on 31 December, the game finishing 1–1, Bolton's first draw since their game at Newcastle United on 26 February, a run of 34 consecutive matches. Sam Ricketts, making his return after a ten-month absence due to injury, put Bolton ahead midway through the first half from twenty yards, but Steven Fletcher equalised early in the second half. This draw coupled with Blackburn Rovers's win at Manchester United ensured that Bolton would finish 2011 bottom of the Premier League.

Bolton's first game of 2012 came in midweek against Everton on 4 January. Tim Howard, Everton's goalkeeper, opened the scoring in bizarre fashion when a wind assisted clearance from his own penalty area took on bounce just outside Bolton's penalty area and looped over Ádám Bogdán. Goals from David Ngog and Gary Cahill in an eleven-minute period gave Bolton the three points. This result moved Bolton up into eighteenth, one point and one place from safety. This was the first time since the previous April that Bolton had avoided defeat in two consecutive games. The run didn't last however, with Bolton going down 3–0 at Manchester United ten days later. After Bogdán had saved a Wayne Rooney penalty midway through the first half, Paul Scholes scored his first goal since coming out of retirement just before the break. Danny Welbeck and Michael Carrick added two further goals in the second half as Bolton slipped to nineteenth. However, by virtue of kicking off in the late game the following Saturday, Bolton knew that they would rise out of the bottom three with a win against Liverpool at The Reebok. An early Mark Davies goal was followed by Nigel Reo-Coker's second goal of the season. Craig Bellamy pulled on back late in the first half but Grétar Steinsson's first goal of the season secured the points in the second half as Bolton won by the same scoreline as Liverpool had done in the reverse fixture earlier in the season. The result took Bolton out of the relegation zone for the first time in over three months.

The club started February with a goalless draw at home to Arsenal which kept them just outside the relegation zone, two points ahead of eighteenth placed Blackburn Rovers. This was Bolton's first clean sheet since the 5–0 victory over Stoke in November and their first goalless draw since the opening day of the previous season when they had drawn at home to Fulham. However, they returned to the relegation zone the following weekend with a 2–0 loss at Norwich City, goals from Andrew Surman and Anthony Pilkington giving Norwich their first double over Bolton in forty years. A week later, they suffered their first home defeat of 2012 when losing 2–1 to relegation rivals Wigan Athletic. A first half goal from Gary Caldwell was cancelled out by Mark Davies midway through the second half. However, James McArthur put Wigan back in front with fifteen minutes left and the result caused Bolton to fall a further place to nineteenth. A fortnight later, Chelsea completed the double over Bolton with a 3–0 win at Stamford Bridge. Second half goals from David Luiz, Didier Drogba and Frank Lampard, the latter's 12th career goal against Bolton, leaving Bolton in 19th.

Bolton began March with a derby at league leaders Manchester City, where manager Owen Coyle started with a 4–1–4–1 formation. However, this could not arrest Bolton's slump as a Grétar Steinsson own goal in the first half and a second from Mario Balotelli in the second half gave their opponents a 2–0 win and left Bolton still in nineteenth place. After four straight defeats, Bolton finally scored a win with a 2–1 victory over relegation rivals Queens Park Rangers at the Reebok Stadium a week later. The away side thought that they had scored midway through the first half when Clint Hill's header appeared to, and was later shown to have, cross the line. However, the goal wasn't given and Darren Pratley gave Bolton the lead with his first Premier League goal late in the half. Djibril Cissé equalised for the visitors soon after the restart but substitute Ivan Klasnić scored late on to take Bolton out of the relegation zone into seventeenth place and to secure a double over the London side.

Bolton's next game was due to be away at Aston Villa on 20 March, but due to the collapse, and subsequent hospitalisation, of Fabrice Muamba during Bolton's FA Cup tie at Tottenham Hotspur the previous Saturday, the game was postponed. This meant that Bolton's next game was a home fixture against local rivals and fellow strugglers Blackburn Rovers the following Saturday. Before the game there was applause for Muamba and a mosaic formed in the lower part of the Lofthouse Stand, spelling out Muamba's name and his squad number. Bolton went on to win the game 2–1, thanks to two David Wheater goals, with Blackburn's sole reply coming from Steven Nzonzi. This result returned Bolton to seventeenth place after they had fallen into the relegation zone due to their midweek inactivity and gave them their first double over Blackburn since the 1977–78 season. A week later, Bolton won their third straight game with a 3–2 victory at Wolverhampton Wanderers. Turning round at half time goalless, Wolves took an early second half lead when Michael Kightly scored. This was quickly cancelled out by a Martin Petrov penalty, after former Wolves player Mark Davies was judged to have been fouled in the area. With ten minutes remaining, Marcos Alonso scored his first goal for the away side and this was quickly followed by another from Kevin Davies. Although Matt Jarvis pulled one back straight away, Bolton held on for the win which lifted them to sixteenth in the table. Bolton's results in March earned manager Owen Coyle the Premier League Manager of the Month award.

The beginning of April saw Bolton's winning run came to an end when they suffered a 3–0 home loss to Fulham, a team that they had not beaten at home since 2007. Two Clint Dempsey goals in the first half were added to by Mahamadou Diarra late in the second half. Results elsewhere, however, meant that Bolton remained in sixteenth place. Two days later, Bolton travelled to high flying Newcastle United but fell to their second defeat of the Easter weekend, Hatem Ben Arfa and Papiss Cissé scoring second half goals for the home team. The defeat initially left Bolton in sixteenth place but results later in the week returned them to the relegation zone. Due to the club's home game with Tottenham Hotspur being postponed as the London side were involved in an FA Cup Semi-Final, Bolton's next game was almost a fortnight later, at home to Swansea City. The away side opened the scoring early on through Scott Sinclair but Chris Eagles equalised within eight minutes. The subsequent draw saw Bolton fall back to nineteenth place. However, three days later they moved back up a place thanks to a win at Aston Villa, the game that had been postponed the previous month. The home side opened the scoring midway through the second half through Stephen Warnock but Bolton quickly replied, scoring twice in the space of just over a minute, first with a Martin Petrov penalty, after Mark Davies had been fouled in the area, and then a David Ngog goal. This result left Bolton one point from safety with a game in hand. The following Saturday they travelled to Sunderland and took the lead through a Kevin Davies volley. However, Nicklas Bendtner equalised before half time and James McClean scored from a free kick ten minutes into the second half to give Sunderland the advantage. However, a second Kevin Davies goal secured Bolton a point which left Bolton inside the relegation zone on goal difference only.

Bolton began may with a home fixture against Tottenham Hotspur, which had been rearranged due to the away side playing in the FA Cup Semi-Final. Before the game, Fabrice Muamba came onto the pitch to a rapturous reception from both sets of supporters which left him visibly moved. Tottenham took the lead towards the end of the first half through a long range effort from Luka Modrić but Bolton drew themselves level early in the second half with a goal from Nigel Reo-Coker. However, three goals in nine minutes, one from Rafael van der Vaart and a brace from Emmanuel Adebayor, gave Tottenham their first ever league win at the Reebok Stadium and left Bolton in the bottom three. There penultimate game, and last home game of the season, was against West Bromwich Albion. Bolton took a first half lead through a Martin Petrov penalty and looked to have secured the game when Billy Jones put the ball into his own net with less than twenty minutes remaining. However, Chris Brunt pulled one back for the away side almost immediately and, with time running out, James Morrison scored an equaliser just before the ninety minutes were up. This result left Bolton in eighteenth place and, with one game left, their fate wasn't in their hands as it left them two points from safety.

The final game of the season saw Bolton travel to Stoke City, while their relegation rivals Queens Park Rangers were at title chasing Manchester City. Former Bolton striker Jonathan Walters scored a controversial early goal when he appeared to bundle goalkeeper Ádám Bogdán into the net when he had hold of the ball, but by the end of the half the away side were ahead through Mark Davies and Kevin Davies. However, Walters scored a second from the penalty spot after Bogdán had fouled Peter Crouch and, although Queens Park Rangers had lost, the point earned at the end of the game was not enough and consigned Bolton to relegation, ending their 11-year run in the Premier League.

=== Results per matchday ===
Matchday	1	2	3	4	5	6	7	8	9	10	11	12	13	14	15	16	17	18	19	20	21	22	23	24	25	26	27	28	29	30	31	32	33	34	35	36	37	38
Ground	A	H	A	H	H	A	H	A	H	A	H	A	H	A	H	A	A	H	H	A	A	H	H	A	H	A	A	H	H	A	H	A	H	A	A	H	H	A
Result	W	L	L	L	L	L	L	W	L	L	W	L	L	L	L	L	W	L	D	W	L	W	D	L	L	L	L	W	W	W	L	L	D	W	D	L	D	D
Position	1	8	10	15	19	20	20	18	18	19	18	18	18	19	20	20	19	19	20	18	19	17	17	18	19	19	19	17	17	16	16	16	18	18	18	18	18	18

Source: WorldFootball.com
A = Away; H = Home; W = Win; D = Draw; L = Loss

13 August 2011	Queens Park Rangers	0–4	Bolton Wanderers	London
15:00 BST		Report	Cahill 45+2'; Gabbidon 67' (o.g.); Klasnić 70'; Muamba 79'	Stadium: Loftus Road; Attendance: 15,195 (771 away); Referee: Martin Atkinson

21 August 2011	Bolton Wanderers	2–3	Manchester City	Bolton
16:00 BST	Klasnić 39'; Muamba (yellow card) 44'; K. Davies (yellow card) 44' (goal) 63'	Report	Silva 26'; Barry 37'; Džeko 47'	Stadium: Reebok Stadium; Attendance: 24,273; Referee: Mike Jones

27 August 2011	Liverpool	3–1	Bolton Wanderers	Liverpool
17:30 BST	Henderson 15'; Škrtel 52'; Adam 53'	Report	Klasnić 90+2'	Stadium: Anfield; Attendance: 44,725; Referee: Lee Probert

10 September 2011	Bolton Wanderers	0–5	Manchester United	Bolton
17:30 BST		Report	Hernández 5', 58'; Rooney 20', 25', 68'	Stadium: Reebok Stadium; Attendance: 25,944; Referee: Andre Marriner

17 September 2011	Bolton Wanderers	1–2	Norwich City	Bolton
15:00 BST	Petrov 63' (pen.)	Report	Pilkington 36'; Johnson 41'	Stadium: Reebok Stadium; Attendance: 21,223; Referee: Howard Webb

24 September 2011	Arsenal	3–0	Bolton Wanderers	London
15:00 BST	Van Persie 46', 71'; Song 89'	Report		Stadium: Emirates Stadium; Attendance: 59,727; Referee: Mark Clattenburg

2 October 2011	Bolton Wanderers	1–5	Chelsea	Bolton
13:30 BST	Ngog (yellow card) 10'; Boyata 46'	Report	2', 25' Sturridge; 15', 27', 59' Lampard; (yellow card) 61' David Luiz; (yellow card) 78' Terry	Stadium: Reebok Stadium; Attendance: 24,657; Referee: Peter Walton

15 October 2011	Wigan Athletic	1–3	Bolton Wanderers	Wigan
15:00 BST	Diamé 40'	Report	Caldwell 4' (o.g.); Ngog 45+3'; Eagles 90+2'	Stadium: DW Stadium; Attendance: 17,261; Referee: Mike Dean

22 October 2011	Bolton Wanderers	0–2	Sunderland	Bolton
15:00 BST		Report	Sessègnon 82'; Bendtner 90+3'	Stadium: Reebok Stadium; Attendance: 24,349; Referee: Mike Jones

29 October 2011	Swansea City	3–1	Bolton Wanderers	Swansea
15:00 BST	Allen 49'; Sinclair 57' (pen.); Graham 90+3'	Report	Graham 73' (o.g.)	Stadium: Liberty Stadium; Attendance: 19,477; Referee: Mark Clattenburg

6 November 2011	Bolton Wanderers	5–0	Stoke City	Bolton
15:00 GMT	K. Davies 2'; Eagles 23', 73'; Klasnić 61', 79'	Report		Stadium: Reebok Stadium; Attendance: 20,028; Referee: Howard Webb

19 November 2011	West Bromwich Albion	2–1	Bolton Wanderers	West Bromwich
15:00 GMT	Thomas 16'; Long 56'	Report	Klasnić 21' (pen.)	Stadium: The Hawthorns; Attendance: 26,221 (2,600 away); Referee: Neil Swarbrick

26 November 2011	Bolton Wanderers	0–2	Everton	Bolton
15:00 GMT		Report	Fellaini 49'; Vellios 78'	Stadium: Reebok Stadium; Attendance: 24,058; Referee: Michael Oliver

3 December 2011	Tottenham Hotspur	3–0	Bolton Wanderers	London
15:00 GMT	Bale 7'; Lennon 50'; Defoe 61'	Report		Stadium: White Hart Lane; Attendance: 35,896; Referee: Stuart Attwell

10 December 2011	Bolton Wanderers	1–2	Aston Villa	Bolton
15:00 GMT	Klasnić 55'	Report	Albrighton 33'; Petrov 39'	Stadium: Reebok Stadium; Attendance: 20,285; Referee: Phil Dowd

17 December 2011	Fulham	2–0	Bolton Wanderers	London
15:00 GMT	Dempsey 32'; Ruiz 34'	Report		Stadium: Craven Cottage; Attendance: 25,643; Referee: Chris Foy

20 December 2011	Blackburn Rovers	1–2	Bolton Wanderers	Blackburn
20:00 GMT	Yakubu 67'	Report	M. Davies 5'; Reo-Coker 30'	Stadium: Ewood Park; Attendance: 25,570; Referee: Martin Atkinson

26 December 2011	Bolton Wanderers	0–2	Newcastle United	Bolton
15:00 GMT		Report	Ben Arfa 69'; Ba 71'	Stadium: Reebok Stadium; Attendance: 26,080; Referee: Peter Walton

31 December 2011	Bolton Wanderers	1–1	Wolverhampton Wanderers	Bolton
15:00 GMT	Ricketts 22'	Report	Fletcher 49'	Stadium: Reebok Stadium; Attendance: 20,354; Referee: Mark Clattenburg

4 January 2012	Everton	1–2	Bolton Wanderers	Liverpool
20:00 GMT	Howard 63'	Report	Ngog 67'; Cahill 78'	Stadium: Goodison Park; Attendance: 29,568 (400 away); Referee: Phil Dowd

14 January 2012	Manchester United	3–0	Bolton Wanderers	Manchester
15:00 GMT	Scholes 45+1'; Welbeck 74'; Carrick 83'	Report		Stadium: Old Trafford; Attendance: 75,444 (3,100 away); Referee: Peter Walton

21 January 2012	Bolton Wanderers	3–1	Liverpool	Bolton
17:30 GMT	Davies 4'; Reo-Coker 29'; Steinsson 50'	Report	Bellamy 37'; José Enrique (yellow card) 63'; Kuyt (yellow card) 90+2'	Stadium: Reebok Stadium; Attendance: 26,854; Referee: Kevin Friend

1 February 2012	Bolton Wanderers	0–0	Arsenal	Bolton
20:00 GMT		Report		Stadium: Reebok Stadium; Attendance: 24,371; Referee: Chris Foy

4 February 2012	Norwich City	2–0	Bolton Wanderers	Norwich
15:00 GMT	Surman 70'; Pilkington 85'	Report		Stadium: Carrow Road; Attendance: 26,358; Referee: Lee Probert

11 February 2012	Bolton Wanderers	1–2	Wigan Athletic	Bolton
15:00 GMT	M. Davies 67'	Report	Caldwell 43'; McArthur 76'	Stadium: Reebok Stadium; Attendance: 23,450; Referee: Howard Webb

25 February 2012	Chelsea	3–0	Bolton Wanderers	London
15:00 GMT	David Luiz 48'; Drogba 61'; Lampard 79'	Report		Stadium: Stamford Bridge; Attendance: 40,999; Referee: Michael Oliver

3 March 2012	Manchester City	2–0	Bolton Wanderers	Manchester
15:00 GMT	Steinsson 23' (o.g.); Balotelli 69'	Report		Stadium: Etihad Stadium; Attendance: 47,219; Referee: Mark Clattenburg

10 March 2012	Bolton Wanderers	2–1	Queens Park Rangers	Bolton
12:45 GMT	Pratley 37'; Klasnić 86'	Report	Cissé 48'	Stadium: Reebok Stadium; Attendance: 21,551; Referee: Martin Atkinson

24 March 2012	Bolton Wanderers	2–1	Blackburn Rovers	Bolton
15:00 GMT	Wheater 28', 35'	Report	Nzonzi 56'	Stadium: Reebok Stadium; Attendance: 26,901; Referee: Andre Marriner

31 March 2012	Wolverhampton Wanderers	2–3	Bolton Wanderers	Wolverhampton
15:00 BST	Kightly 53'; Jarvis 88'	Report	Petrov 63' (pen.); Alonso 80'; K. Davies 84'	Stadium: Molineux Stadium; Attendance: 25,215 (1,200 away); Referee: Jonathan Moss

7 April 2012	Bolton Wanderers	0–3	Fulham	Bolton
15:00 BST		Report	Dempsey 30', 45'; Diarra 80'	Stadium: Reebok Stadium; Attendance: 21,939; Referee: Mike Dean

9 April 2012	Newcastle United	2–0	Bolton Wanderers	Newcastle upon Tyne
15:00 BST	Ben Arfa 73'; Cissé 83'	Report		Stadium: Sports Direct Arena; Attendance: 52,264 (1,000 away); Referee: Mike Jones

21 April 2012	Bolton Wanderers	1–1	Swansea City	Bolton
15:00 BST	Eagles 14'; M. Davies (yellow card) 41'; Steinsson (yellow card) 63'	Report	Sinclair 6'; Williams (yellow card) 30'	Stadium: Reebok Stadium; Attendance: 25,401; Referee: Phil Dowd

24 April 2012	Aston Villa	1–2	Bolton Wanderers	Birmingham
19:45 BST	Warnock 61'	Report	Petrov 62' (pen.); Ngog 63'	Stadium: Villa Park; Attendance: 32,263 (1,000 away); Referee: Chris Foy

28 April 2012	Sunderland	2–2	Bolton Wanderers	Sunderland
15:00 BST	Bendtner 36'; McClean 55'	Report	K. Davies 26', 70'	Stadium: Stadium of Light; Attendance: 40,768; Referee: Lee Probert

2 May 2012	Bolton Wanderers	1–4	Tottenham Hotspur	Bolton
20:00 BST	Reo-Coker 51'	Report	Modrić 37'; Van der Vaart 60'; Adebayor 62', 69'	Stadium: Reebok Stadium; Attendance: 22,349; Referee: Mike Dean

6 May 2012	Bolton Wanderers	2–2	West Bromwich Albion	Bolton
14:00 BST	Petrov 24' (pen.); Jones 72' (o.g.)	Report	Brunt 75'; Morrison 90'	Stadium: Reebok Stadium; Attendance: 25,662 (4,635 away); Referee: Kevin Friend

13 May 2012	Stoke City	2–2	Bolton Wanderers	Stoke-on-Trent
15:00 BST	Walters 13', 76' (pen.)	Report	M. Davies 39'; K. Davies 45'	Stadium: Britannia Stadium; Attendance: 27,789; Referee: Chris Foy

=== Table ===
Pos	Team	Pld	W	D	L	GF	GA	GD	Pts	Qualification or relegation
16	Aston Villa	38	7	17	14	37	53	−16	38	
17	Queens Park Rangers	38	10	7	21	43	66	−23	37	
18	Bolton Wanderers (R)	38	10	6	22	46	77	−31	36	Relegation to Football League Championship
19	Blackburn Rovers (R)	38	8	7	23	48	78	−30	31	Relegation to Football League Championship
20	Wolverhampton Wanderers (R)	38	5	10	23	40	82	−42	25	Relegation to Football League Championship

Source: Barclays Premier League
Rules for classification: 1) points; 2) goal difference; 3) number of goals scored.
(R) Relegated

== FA Cup ==
Bolton entered the FA Cup at the Third Round stage with the other Premier League clubs, as well as those from the Championship. The Third Round ties were played on the weekend beginning 7 January 2012. The draw made on 4 December 2011 gave Bolton an away tie at either Chelmsford City or Macclesfield Town who had drawn their second round tie. Macclesfield won the replay on 14 December. This marked the teams' second meeting of the season after their League Cup tie in August. Ivan Klasnić scored an early goal in the tie, his eighth of the season, before Macclesfield scored twice through Colin Daniel and Arnaud Mendy either side of half time. David Wheater, with his first goal for Bolton, equalised late in the second half, taking the game to a replay at the Reebok Stadium ten days later, which Bolton won 2–0. A goal within the first five minutes from Kevin Davies, his first since November, and Martin Petrov set up a home tie against Swansea City in the Fourth round. The game took place on 29 January with Bolton winning 2–1. Darren Pratley's first goal for the club in first half injury time, against the team he left in the summer, equalised Luke Moore's opener for Swansea. Chris Eagles scored the winner early in the second half to send Bolton into the fifth round. The draw was held the following day and gave Bolton an away tie at either Millwall or Southampton who would be replaying their tie on 7 February. Millwall won the replay 3–2 and played Bolton on 18 February. Goals from Ryo Miyaichi, making his first start for the club, and David Ngog took Bolton into the quarter-finals for the second successive season where they were away to Tottenham Hotspur, who won their replayed tie against Stevenage. Bolton took the lead early in the first half through a Gareth Bale own goal but Kyle Walker equalised shortly afterwards. However, the game was abandoned after forty one minutes when Fabrice Muamba collapsed and was taken to hospital. After Muamba, who has suffered a cardiac arrest, showed signs of improvement in hospital, the game was rearranged for 27 March. This game, however, would prove to be Bolton's last in the competition that season. Although they went in goalless at half-time, Bolton had not had a single shot in that time. They eventually held out until the seventy fourth minute before Ryan Nelsen scored his first goal from Tottenham. This was quickly followed by another Spurs goal as Gareth Bale scored. Kevin Davies gave Bolton some hope with a late goal but this was quickly extinguished when Louis Saha scored in injury time.

7 January 2012 R3	Macclesfield Town	2–2	Bolton Wanderers	Macclesfield
15:00 GMT	Daniel 16'; Mendy 68'	Report	Klasnić 7'; Wheater 77'	Stadium: Moss Rose; Attendance: 5,757; Referee: Jonathan Moss

17 January 2012 R3 Replay	Bolton Wanderers	2–0	Macclesfield Town	Bolton
20:00 GMT	K. Davies 1'; Petrov 26'	Report		Stadium: Reebok Stadium; Attendance: 9,466; Referee: Michael Oliver

28 January 2012 R4	Bolton Wanderers	2–1	Swansea City	Bolton
15:00 GMT	Pratley 45+2'; Eagles 56'	Report	Moore 43'	Stadium: Reebok Stadium; Attendance: 11,597; Referee: Anthony Taylor

18 February 2012 R5	Millwall	0–2	Bolton Wanderers	London
15:00 GMT		Report	Ryo 4'; Ngog 59'	Stadium: The Den; Attendance: 11,134 (1,054 away); Referee: Kevin Friend

17 March 2012 R6	Tottenham Hotspur	1–1 (Abandoned)	Bolton Wanderers	London
17:30 GMT	Walker 11'	Report	Bale 6' (o.g.)	Stadium: White Hart Lane; Referee: Howard Webb

27 March 2012 R6	Tottenham Hotspur	3–1	Bolton Wanderers	London
19:30 BST	Nelsen 74'; Bale 77'; Saha 90+3'	Report	K.Davies 90'	Stadium: White Hart Lane; Attendance: 30,718; Referee: Howard Webb

== League Cup ==
Bolton entered the League Cup at the Second Round stage along with the other Premier League clubs other than those involved in European competition. The draw took place on 11 August 2011, with Bolton starting their League Cup campaign at home to League Two side Macclesfield Town on 24 August. Goals from debutant Tuncay and Martin Petrov gave Bolton a 2–1 win and put them into the draw for the third round, which took place on 27 August and gave Bolton an away tie at Aston Villa.

The game was played on 20 September. After a scoreless first half, second half goals from Chris Eagles and debutant Gaël Kakuta gave Bolton a 2–0 win and put them in the draw for the last sixteen which took place on 24 September. Ironically, on the day that Bolton played Arsenal at the Emirates Stadium in the league, they were drawn to play them away in the next round on 25 October. Former Arsenal youth player Fabrice Muamba opened the scoring early in the second half, but two quick replies from Andrei Arshavin and Park Chu-Young ensured Bolton's exit from the competition.

24 August 2011 R2	Bolton Wanderers	2–1	Macclesfield Town	Reebok Stadium
20:00 BST	Tuncay 56'; Petrov 73'		Sinclair 11'	Attendance: 6,777; Referee: Eddie Ilderton

20 September 2011 R3	Aston Villa	0–2	Bolton Wanderers	Villa Park
19:45 BST			Eagles 54'; Kakuta 77'	Attendance: 22,261; Referee: Darren Deadman

25 October 2011 R4	Arsenal	2–1	Bolton Wanderers	Emirates Stadium
19:45 BST	Arshavin 53'; Park 56'		Muamba 47'	Attendance: 56,628 (100 away); Referee: Anthony Taylor

== Squad statistics ==
No.	Pos.	Name	League		FA Cup		League Cup		Total		Discipline	
No.	Pos.	Name	Apps	Goals	Apps	Goals	Apps	Goals	Apps	Goals	Yellow card	Red card
1	GK	(Hungary) Ádám Bogdán	20	0	5	0	3	0	28	0	0	0
2	DF	(Iceland) Grétar Steinsson	23	1	1	0	2	0	26	1	6	0
3	DF	(Spain) Marcos Alonso	5	1	1	0	1	0	7	1	0	0
4	DF	(England) Paul Robinson	17	0	2	0	1	0	20	0	5	0
5	DF	(England) Gary Cahill	19	2	0	0	2	0	21	2	3	0
6	MF	(England) Fabrice Muamba	20	1	2	0	2	1	24	2	2	0
7	MF	(England) Chris Eagles	34	4	4	1	3	1	41	6	1	0
8	MF	(United States) Stuart Holden	0	0	0	0	1	0	1	0	0	0
9	FW	(Turkey) Tuncay	16	0	4	0	2	1	22	1	0	0
10	MF	(Bulgaria) Martin Petrov	31	4	3	1	1	1	35	6	2	0
11	MF	(Jamaica) Ricardo Gardner	4	0	0	0	2	0	6	0	2	1
12	DF	(England) Zat Knight	25	0	2	0	2	0	29	0	1	0
14	FW	(England) Kevin Davies	31	6	4	2	2	0	35	8	3	0
15	DF	(England) Tyrone Mears	1	0	0	0	0	0	1	0	0	0
16	MF	(England) Mark Davies	35	4	5	0	3	0	43	4	7	0
17	FW	(Croatia) Ivan Klasnić	29	8	3	1	1	0	35	9	3	1
18	DF	(Wales) Sam Ricketts	20	1	4	0	0	0	24	1	3	0
19	MF	(England) Nigel Reo-Coker	37	3	5	0	0	0	42	3	8	0
20	FW	(England) Robbie Blake	1	0	0	0	2	0	3	0	0	0
21	MF	(England) Darren Pratley	25	1	4	1	3	0	31	2	5	0
22	GK	(Finland) Jussi Jääskeläinen	18	0	0	0	0	0	18	0	2	0
23	MF	(England) Sean Davis	0	0	0	0	0	0	0	0	0	0
24	FW	(France) David Ngog	33	3	4	1	2	0	39	4	2	0
25	DF	(Belgium) Dedryck Boyata	14	1	3	0	0	0	17	1	4	0
26	GK	(England) Rob Lainton	0	0	0	0	0	0	0	0	0	0
27	MF	(South Korea) Lee Chung-Yong	2	0	0	0	0	0	2	0	0	0
28	MF	(France) Gaël Kakuta	4	0	0	0	2	1	6	1	0	0
29	FW	(England) Marvin Sordell	3	0	0	0	0	0	3	0	0	0
30	MF	(Japan) Ryo Miyaichi	12	0	2	1	0	0	14	1	0	0
31	DF	(England) David Wheater	24	2	4	1	2	0	30	3	4	2
32	DF	(United States) Tim Ream	13	0	2	0	0	0	15	0	1	0
33	DF	(Republic of Ireland) Mark Connolly	0	0	0	0	0	0	0	0	0	0
34	FW	(England) Tom Eaves	0	0	0	0	0	0	0	0	0	0
35	FW	(England) Tope Obadeyi	0	0	0	0	0	0	0	0	0	0
36	FW	(Scotland) Michael O'Halloran	0	0	1	0	1	0	2	0	0	0
37	MF	(England) Josh Vela	3	0	0	0	0	0	3	0	1	0
38	MF	(England) Adam Blakeman	0	0	0	0	1	0	1	0	0	0
39	DF	(England) Joe Riley	3	0	3	0	1	0	7	0	1	0
40	MF	(England) Rhys Bennett	0	0	0	0	0	0	0	0	0	0
43	GK	(England) Jay Lynch	0	0	0	0	0	0	0	0	0	0
--	MF	(Scotland) Gregg Wylde	0	0	0	0	0	0	0	0	0	0
–	–	Own goals	–	3	–	0	–	0	–	3		

Statistics accurate as of match played 13 May 2012

== Transfers ==
On the commencement of the summer transfer window on 1 July, long-serving midfielder Joey O'Brien, central midfielder Tamir Cohen, and defender Jlloyd Samuel all left the club as their contracts had expired. Swedish forward Johan Elmander, who three years previously had been the club's record signing, also left at the end of his contract and quickly signed for Turkish club Galatasary. On the same day, the club signed Darren Pratley on a free transfer after he had rejected a new deal at Swansea City. Three days later, Ali Al-Habsi, who had spent the previous season on loan at Wigan Athletic, joined them on a permanent basis in a deal believed to be in the region of £4million. On 11 July 2011, young striker Danny Ward signed for Huddersfield Town for an undisclosed fee on a three-year deal, with the option of a further year. Later that month, Matt Taylor, who had been at the club for three years, joined former Bolton manager Sam Allardyce at his new club West Ham United, again for an undisclosed fee. A few days later, Bolton made their second signing of the window, bringing in free agent Nigel Reo-Coker, who had left Aston Villa following the end of the previous season. The club then supplemented this signing by bringing in Chris Eagles and Tyrone Mears from Burnley, manager Owen Coyle's previous club, for a combined fee in the region of £3million. Bolton also signed Tuncay and Dedryck Boyata on loan from Wolfsburg and Manchester City respectively. On the final day of the transfer window, Bolton signed David Ngog from Liverpool on a three-year contract for an undisclosed fee and Gaël Kakuta from Chelsea until January respectively.

Bolton's first action of the January transfer window, on 11 January, was to send reserve team player Jack Sampson, who had signed a new deal the previous day, to Southend United on loan for a month, with Southend having the option to extend it, which they did on 13 February for a further month. This was further extended for another month on 12 March. On 16 January, England international Gary Cahill completed a move to Chelsea with the fee believed to be around £7million. Bolton had agreed a fee with Chelsea for the player shortly before the turn of the year but the transfer had been delayed due to the player failing to agree personal terms with the London club. Bolton replaced Cahill with another defender later in the month when they signed United States international Tim Ream from the New York Red Bulls. Ream had been on trial with both Bolton and West Bromwich Albion in late 2011 and signed on a three-and-a-half-year deal, for an undisclosed fee, believed to be £2.5 million. On transfer deadline day, 31 January, Bolton secured the loan signing of Japanese under-19 international Ryo Miyaichi from Arsenal for the rest of the season and England under-21 international Marvin Sordell from Watford for a figure believed to be between £3–4 million. On the same day they loaned reserve team midfield player Graeme MacGregor to Hamilton Academical until the end of the season. On 24 February, Bolton loaned out two players, reserve team captain Mark Connolly to Macclesfield and midfielder Sean Davis, who had made only four first team appearances following two major injures since joining the club in 2009, to Bristol City, both on one month deals. At the beginning of March, Bolton loaned veteran defender Paul Robinson to Leeds United, also on a month loan. At the end of the initial month, the loan was extended until the end of the season. Later in the month Tope Obadeyi was loaned to Rochdale for a second time having been there for a period two seasons previously. On 17 March, Bolton signed free agent Gregg Wylde, subject to FIFA approval, who had left Scottish club Rangers after they went into administration and had to lay off players in order to stay in business. Five days later, young Scottish forward Michael O'Halloran joined Sheffield United on loan until the end of the season.

=== In ===
Date	Pos.	Name	From	Fee
1 July 2011	MF	(England) Darren Pratley	(Wales) Swansea City	Free
27 July 2011	MF	(England) Nigel Reo-Coker	(England) Aston Villa	Free
29 July 2011	MF	(England) Chris Eagles	(England) Burnley	£1,530,000
29 July 2011	DF	(England) Tyrone Mears	(England) Burnley	£1,530,000
31 August 2011	FW	(France) David Ngog	(England) Liverpool	£4,000,000
26 January 2012	DF	(United States) Tim Ream	(United States) New York Red Bulls	£2,790,000
31 January 2012	FW	(England) Marvin Sordell	(England) Watford	£3,240,000
17 March 2012	MF	(Scotland) Gregg Wylde	(Scotland) Rangers	Free

=== Out ===
Date	Pos.	Name	To	Fee
1 July 2011	DF	(Trinidad and Tobago) Jlloyd Samuel	(Iran) Esteghlal	Free
1 July 2011	MF	(Republic of Ireland) Joey O'Brien	(England) West Ham United	Free
1 July 2011	MF	(Israel) Tamir Cohen	(Israel) Maccabi Haifa	Free
1 July 2011	FW	(Sweden) Johan Elmander	(Turkey) Galatasaray	Free
1 July 2011	MF	(Republic of Ireland) Sam Sheridan	(England) Stockport County	Free
4 July 2011	GK	(Oman) Ali Al-Habsi	(England) Wigan Athletic	£3,870,000
11 July 2011	FW	(England) Danny Ward	(England) Huddersfield Town	£1,020,000
23 July 2011	MF	(England) Matthew Taylor	(England) West Ham United	£4,230,000
16 January 2012	DF	(England) Gary Cahill	(England) Chelsea	£7,560,000

=== Loan in ===
Date from	Date to	Pos.	Name	From
11 August 2011	30 June 2012	FW	(Turkey) Tuncay	(Germany) Wolfsburg
26 August 2011	30 June 2012	DF	(Belgium) Dedryck Boyata	(England) Manchester City
31 August 2011	1 January 2012	MF	(France) Gaël Kakuta	(England) Chelsea
31 January 2012	30 June 2012	MF	(Japan) Ryo Miyaichi	(England) Arsenal

=== Loan out ===
Date from	Date to	Pos.	Name	To
13 July 2011	30 June 2012	DF	(England) Rhys Bennett	(Scotland) Falkirk
8 November 2011	26 December 2011	FW	(England) Tope Obadeyi	(England) Chesterfield
11 January 2012	12 April 2012	FW	(England) Jack Sampson	(England) Southend United
31 January 2012	30 June 2012	MF	(Scotland) Graeme MacGregor	(Scotland) Hamilton Academical
24 February 2012	23 March 2012	DF	(Republic of Ireland) Mark Connolly	(England) Macclesfield Town
24 February 2012	24 March 2012	MF	(England) Sean Davis	(England) Bristol City
6 March 2012	30 April 2012	DF	(England) Paul Robinson	(England) Leeds United
14 March 2012	13 April 2012	FW	(England) Tope Obadeyi	(England) Rochdale
22 March 2012	30 June 2012	FW	(Scotland) Michael O'Halloran	(England) Sheffield United
