= Richard Davies (footballer) =

English former footballer (born 1990)

Personal information
- Full name: Richard Peter Davies
- Date of birth: 15 May 1990 (age 36)
- Place of birth: Willenhall, England
- Position: Midfielder

Youth career
- ?–2008: Walsall

Senior career*
Years	Team	Apps	(Gls)
2008–2010	Walsall	6	(0)
2009	→ Solihull Moors (loan)		
2010–2013	AFC Telford United	47	(4)
2010–2011	→ Chasetown (loan)	26	(4)
2013–2014	Barrow	31	(2)
2014–2015	Chasetown		
- * Club domestic league appearances and goals

Richard Peter Davies (born 15 May 1990) is an English former professional footballer.

== Career ==
=== Walsall ===
He made his Walsall debut on 27 January 2009 in the Football League One clash with Swindon Town at the County Ground, which ended in a 3–2 loss. He was released by Walsall on 10 May 2010 along with six other players

=== AFC Telford United ===
He joined AFC Telford in 2010 after he got released from Walsall FC. He went on loan to Chasetown FC shortly after. After spending a season long loan at Chasetown FC he got recalled for the play off semi-final against Nuneaton Town which they won. Following his good performance in that game he became a first team player for the Bucks. He became a key player for AFC Telford in the Blue Square Prem.

=== Barrow ===
In June 2013 he joined Barrow AFC in the Conference North after his contract was not renewed at Telford.

== Career statistics ==
Appearances and goals by club, season and competition
Club	Season	League		FA Cup		League Cup		Other		Total	
Club	Season	Apps	Goals	Apps	Goals	Apps	Goals	Apps	Goals	Apps	Goals
Walsall	2008–09	3	0	0	0	0	0	0	0	3	0
A.F.C. Telford United	2011–12	34	3	1	0	0	0	0	0	35	3
A.F.C. Telford United	2012–13	13	2	0	0	0	0	0	0	13	2
Total		50	5	1	0	0	0	0	0	51	5

== Personal life ==
He is the younger brother of former Bolton Wanderers midfielder Mark Davies.
