= Ádám Bogdán =

Hungarian footballer (born 1987)

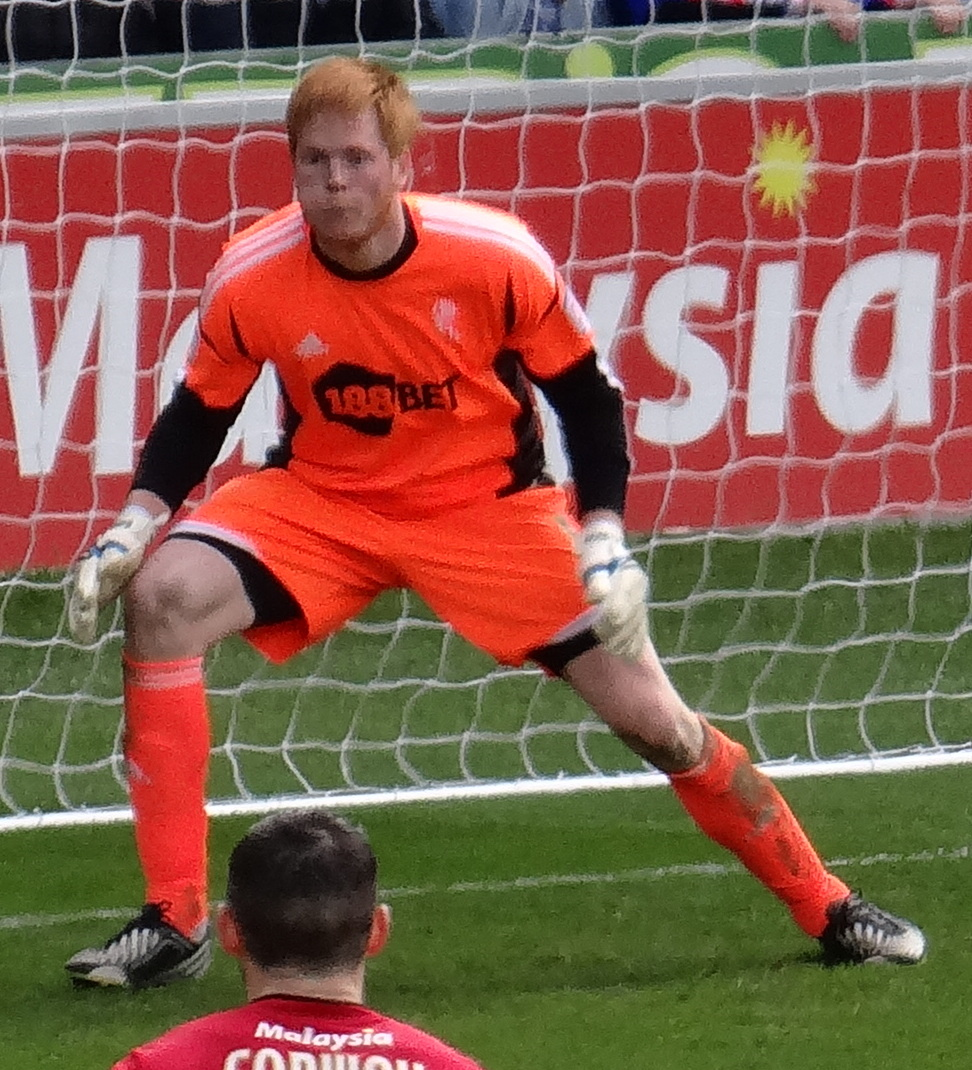
- Bogdán playing for Bolton Wanderers in 2013

Personal information
- Full name: Ádám Bogdán
- Date of birth: 27 September 1987 (age 39)
- Place of birth: Budapest, Hungary
- Height: 1.94 m (6 ft 4 in)
- Position: Goalkeeper

Youth career
- Vasas

Senior career*
Years	Team	Apps	(Gls)
2005–2007	Vasas	0	(0)
2006	→ Vecsés (loan)	9	(0)
2007–2015	Bolton Wanderers	104	(0)
2009	→ Crewe Alexandra (loan)	1	(0)
2015–2019	Liverpool	2	(0)
2016	→ Wigan Athletic (loan)	17	(0)
2018–2019	→ Hibernian (loan)	18	(0)
2019–2020	Hibernian	0	(0)
2020–2023	Ferencváros	15	(0)

International career^{‡}
2007–2008	Hungary U21	7	(0)
2011–2021	Hungary	21	(0)
- * Club domestic league appearances and goals as of 18:20, 15 May 2022 (UTC) ‡ National team caps and goals as of 13:11, 12 November 2021 (UTC)

Ádám Bogdán (Hungarian pronunciation: [ˈaːdaːm ˈboɡdaːn]; born 27 September 1987) is a Hungarian former professional footballer who played as a goalkeeper.

Bogdán began his career in Hungary at Vasas before spending time on loan at Vecsés. In 2007, he moved to English club Bolton Wanderers, for whom he made 120 appearances across all competitions, before moving to Liverpool in 2015. Rarely used at Liverpool, he had a loan at Wigan Athletic in 2016, cut short by a knee injury. After a long period recovering from the injury, Bogdán was loaned to Scottish club Hibernian in July 2018. He was released by Liverpool in the summer of 2019, and then signed with Hibernian.

He made his senior international debut for Hungary in 2011. Bogdán has since earned 20 caps and represented Hungary in 2014 FIFA World Cup qualification matches.

== Club career ==
=== Early career ===
Born in Budapest, Bogdán started his career with Hungarian Nemzeti Bajnokság I team Vasas. He also had a loan spell at Vecsés where in his nine games he impressed Bolton Wanderers scouts.

=== Bolton Wanderers ===
He signed for Bolton on a two-year contract on 1 August 2007. His contract was extended in 2009 until June 2011.

In September 2009, Bogdán joined League Two team Crewe Alexandra on a one-month loan. He made his debut on 29 September 2009 in a 3–2 home defeat to Bury, during which he made an error that cost Alexandra a point.

He made his Bolton debut in a 1–0 League Cup victory over Southampton on 24 August 2010. On 29 August 2010, Bogdán made his Premier League debut when he replaced Jussi Jääskeläinen, who had been sent off for violent conduct, 37 minutes into the home game against Birmingham City. He made his first Premier League start in the away game at Arsenal on 11 September. Following Jääskeläinen's return, Bogdán returned to the bench but manager Owen Coyle gave Bogdán starts in both the League Cup and FA Cup. On 31 March 2011, he signed an extension to his existing contract, which would keep him at the club until 2014.

The 2011–12 season gave Bogdán more playing time after Jääskeläinen suffered an injury during an international break, but in his first league game, on 2 October, he conceded five goals against Chelsea and Jääskeläinen returned for the next league game. Three months later on 4 January, after Jääskeläinen suffered another injury, Bogdán returned for a game at Everton where he was beaten by a 102-yard wind assisted clearance by Everton goalkeeper Tim Howard from his own penalty area in a 2–1 victory at Goodison Park. On 14 January 2012, Bogdán saved a penalty kick from Wayne Rooney, although Bolton lost 3–0 to Manchester United.

He performed well during Jääskeläinen's absence and when the Finn returned from injury, Bogdán kept his place for the home game against Arsenal on 1 February, in which he kept a clean sheet in a goalless draw. Despite Jääskeläinen's return to full fitness, Bogdán remained first choice goalkeeper. On 11 March 2012, after Bolton's victory over QPR, and on 1 April 2012, after Bolton's 3–2 victory over Wolverhampton Wanderers, Bogdán was selected for in the "team of the week" by Garth Crooks. On 14 May 2012, Bolton Wanderers held their annual end of season dinner, with Bogdán the recipient of the main accolade as he was named the club's Player of the Year, which is voted by the supporters. Bogdán admitted he felt mixed emotions after getting the award due to the draw against Stoke City which resulted in Bolton's relegation from the Premier League.

Bogdán signed a contract extension on 29 November 2012, which extended his contract to summer 2015. During the 2014–15 season, Bogdán only made 10 appearances for Bolton, after being displaced as the team's first-choice goalkeeper by Andy Lonergan.

=== Liverpool ===
On 12 June 2015, it was confirmed that Bogdán would join Liverpool on a free transfer on 1 July, when his contract expired. He made his debut on 23 September, in a League Cup third round tie against Carlisle United at Anfield, and saved three penalties in the shootout, enabling his side to win the shootout 3–2.

On 20 December, he made his Premier League debut for the Reds in a 3–0 loss to Watford at Vicarage Road, dropping a corner kick after three minutes to allow Nathan Aké to open the scoring. Bogdán also played in a much-changed Liverpool side away to Exeter City on 8 January 2016 in the third round of the FA Cup, conceding direct from Lee Holmes' corner kick in a 2–2 draw.

On the last match of the 2015–16 Premier League season, Bogdán was named in the starting line up against West Brom after a long absence from the first team squad. West Brom opened the scoring through Salomón Rondón in the 13th minute, before Jordon Ibe leveled in the 23rd minute – the match ended in a 1–1 draw.

On 20 July 2016, Bogdán joined Wigan Athletic on loan for the 2016–17 season. Bogdán made 17 appearances for Wigan, keeping five clean sheets. In his final game, a 0–0 draw against Barnsley on 19 November, Bogdán suffered a tear in his anterior cruciate ligament and was substituted in the 59th minute. Bogdán then returned to his parent club Liverpool for rehabilitation.

On 2 July 2018, Bogdán moved on a season-long loan to Scottish Premiership club Hibernian. Bogdán played regularly for Hibernian during the early part of the 2018–19 season, but then missed several games due to concussion symptoms.

He was released by Liverpool at the end of the 2018–19 season.

=== Hibernian ===
Bogdán signed a short-term contract with Hibernian, where he had been on loan in the previous season, in November 2019. His contract was extended in January 2020 to the end of the 2019–20 season, as the loan of Chris Maxwell was expected to be curtailed. Bogdán was one of three first team players released by Hibs at the end of the 2019–20 season.

=== Ferencváros ===
On 1 July 2020, Bogdán returned to Hungary and signing for reigning champions Ferencváros.

On 5 May 2023, he won the 2022–23 Nemzeti Bajnokság I with Ferencváros, after Kecskemét lost 1–0 to Honvéd at the Bozsik Aréna on the 30th matchday.

== International career ==
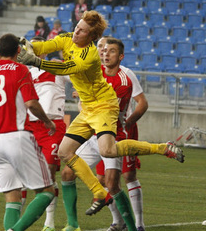
Bogdán playing for Hungary in 2011

Bogdán received his first call up for Hungary in October 2008, and was an unused substitute in their 1–0 win over Malta. In June 2011 he made his first full international appearance, in a 1–0 win against Luxembourg. He was named as Hungarian Player of the Year for 2012. On 11 October 2013, he kept goal in the nation's record defeat, 1–8 to the Netherlands at the Amsterdam Arena in 2014 World Cup qualification. He was named as the Hungarian Player of the Year for the second year in a row for 2013.

On 1 June 2021, Bogdán was included in the final 26-man squad to represent Hungary at the rescheduled UEFA Euro 2020 tournament.

== Career statistics ==
=== Club ===
As of 20 May 2023

Appearances and goals by club, season and competition
Club	Season	League			National cup (Note: Includes FA Cup, Scottish Cup, Magyar Kupa)		League cup (Note: Includes Football League Cup, Scottish League Cup)		Europe		Total	
Club	Season	Division	Apps	Goals	Apps	Goals	Apps	Goals	Apps	Goals	Apps	Goals
Bolton Wanderers	2009–10	Premier League	—		—		—		—		—	
Bolton Wanderers	2010–11	Premier League	4	0	3	0	2	0	—		9	0
Bolton Wanderers	2011–12	Premier League	20	0	5	0	3	0	—		28	0
Bolton Wanderers	2012–13	Championship	41	0	—		—		—		41	0
Bolton Wanderers	2013–14	Championship	29	0	—		—		—		29	0
Bolton Wanderers	2014–15	Championship	10	0	2	0	1	0	—		13	0
Bolton Wanderers	Total		104	0	10	0	6	0	—		120	0
Crewe Alexandra (loan)	2009–10	League One	1	0	—		—		—		1	0
Liverpool	2015–16	Premier League	2	0	1	0	3	0	—		6	0
Liverpool	2017–18	Premier League	0	0	0	0	0	0	0	0	0	0
Liverpool	Total		2	0	1	0	3	0	—		6	0
Wigan Athletic (loan)	2016–17	Championship	17	0	—		—		—		17	0
Hibernian (loan)	2018–19 (Note: Soccerbase did not record appearances made by Bogdán against NSI Runavik on 19 July, Asteras Tripolis on 26 July and 2 August, and Molde on 16 August 2018.)	Scottish Premiership	18	0	1	0	1	0	5 (Note: Appearance(s) in UEFA Europa League)	0	25	0
Hibernian	2019–20	Scottish Premiership	0	0	0	0	0	0	0	0	0	0
Ferencváros	2020–21 (Note: Soccerway did not record appearances made by Bogdán against Ráckeve VAFC on 19 September and Dorogi FC on 10 February)	Nemzeti Bajnokság I	5	0	2	0	—		0	0	7	0
Ferencváros	2021–22 (Note: Soccerway did not record appearances made by Bogdán against FC Hatvan on 19 September and VSK Tököl on 27 October)	Nemzeti Bajnokság I	7	0	3	0	—		1	0	11	0
Ferencváros	2022–23 (Note: Soccerway did not record an appearancea made by Bogdán against Bicskei TC on 18 September)	Nemzeti Bajnokság I	3	0	2	0	—		1	0	6	0
Ferencváros	Total		15	0	7	0	—		2	0	29	0
Career total			157	0	19	0	10	0	7	0	193	0

=== International ===
As of match played on 8 June 2021

Appearances and goals by national team and year
National team	Year	Apps	Goals
Hungary	2011	4	0
Hungary	2012	8	0
Hungary	2013	6	0
Hungary	2014	1	0
Hungary	2016	1	0
Hungary	2021	1	0
Total		21	0

== Honours ==
Liverpool

- Football League Cup runner-up: 2015–16

Ferencváros

- Nemzeti Bajnokság I: 2020–21, 2021–22, 2022–23
- Magyar Kupa: 2021–22

Individual

- Bolton Wanderers Player of the Year: 2012
- Hungarian Player of the Year: 2012, 2013
