= Gary Cahill =

English footballer (born 1985)

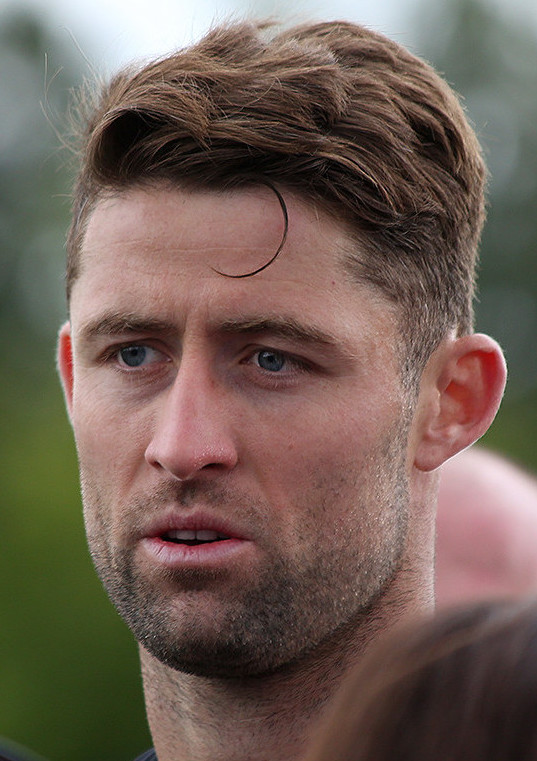
- Cahill training with England at the 2018 FIFA World Cup

Personal information
- Full name: Gary James Cahill
- Date of birth: 19 December 1985 (age 40)
- Place of birth: Dronfield, England
- Height: 6 ft 4 in (1.93 m)
- Position: Centre-back

Youth career
- –2000: AFC Dronfield
- 2000–2004: Aston Villa

Senior career*
Years	Team	Apps	(Gls)
2004–2008	Aston Villa	28	(1)
2004–2005	→ Burnley (loan)	27	(1)
2007	→ Sheffield United (loan)	16	(2)
2008–2012	Bolton Wanderers	130	(13)
2012–2019	Chelsea	191	(13)
2019–2021	Crystal Palace	45	(1)
2021–2022	AFC Bournemouth	22	(0)
Total		459	(31)

International career
2004–2005	England U20	3	(0)
2007	England U21	3	(0)
2009–2018	England	61	(5)
- * Club domestic league appearances and goals

Gary James Cahill (born 19 December 1985) is an English former professional footballer who played as a centre-back.

Cahill began his career playing for the AFC Dronfield youth system in Derbyshire. In 2000, he joined the Aston Villa Academy and continued his development. In 2004, he joined Burnley on a season-long loan, where he performed well before returning to make his Aston Villa debut. Later, he signed for hometown club Sheffield United on a three-month loan deal. On 30 January 2008, he signed for Bolton Wanderers for around £5 million. Cahill performed well for Bolton through the years, cementing a place in the first team. He made 130 league appearances and scored 13 league goals for Bolton. In January 2012, Cahill signed for Chelsea for approximately £7 million. He won the UEFA Champions League in his debut season at Chelsea, and went on to win the UEFA Europa League twice, the Premier League twice, the FA Cup twice and the League Cup. Following his release in 2019, Cahill joined fellow London club Crystal Palace on a free transfer. He left the club after two seasons in 2021, later joining Bournemouth, before retiring in 2022.

Cahill is a former England international with over 60 caps, and represented the nation in England tournament squads for the FIFA World Cups of 2014 and 2018, and the UEFA European Championship in 2012 and 2016, though he withdrew injured from the 2012 event. He was eligible to play for either England or the Republic of Ireland, but chose to play for England. In June 2009, Cahill was called up to the England squad for the match against Kazakhstan; however, he only made his debut on 3 September 2010, coming on as a substitute against Bulgaria. He made his first start for the national team on 29 March 2011, in the friendly against Ghana. He scored his first international goal against Bulgaria, in a UEFA Euro 2012 qualifier.

== Early life ==
Cahill was born and raised in Dronfield, Derbyshire, and attended Dronfield Henry Fanshawe School. He was a boyhood Sheffield Wednesday supporter and "grew up watching Sheffield Wednesday, and points to Des Walker as his childhood hero."

== Club career ==
=== Early career ===
Cahill began his career with AFC Dronfield, a Sunday league team, where he played until he was 15. During his time there, he was scouted by a number of clubs, including Barnsley, Sheffield Wednesday, Derby County and Aston Villa, the last of which he signed for as a member of the club's Academy. "All my friends played for the local side, AFC Dronfield, so I went along and started playing centre half and in centre midfield for them", said Cahill in an interview with the Manchester Evening News. Cahill started his career as central midfielder, but moved to centre-back after rapidly increasing in height within the space of a year when he was about 15 or 16, just when he was looking to get his first YTS contract.

=== Aston Villa ===
On 8 November 2004, Cahill was loaned to Burnley. He made his first-team debut the following day in the fourth round of the League Cup, playing the full 90 minutes as they lost 0–3 to Tottenham Hotspur at Turf Moor. On 13 November, he made his debut in the Football League, in the Clarets' 1–0 home Championship win over Nottingham Forest. He made 32 appearances on loan, 27 of which were in the league, scoring once on 3 January 2005, the only goal against Stoke City at the Britannia Stadium. At the end of the season, nineteen-year-old Cahill was handed the accolade of Burnley's Young Player of the Year.

Cahill made his Villa debut on 20 September 2005 in the second round of the League Cup, playing the entirety of an 8–3 win over Wycombe Wanderers away at Adams Park. On the following 1 April, he made his Premier League debut as a 52nd-minute replacement for Ulises de la Cruz in the 5–0 defeat at Arsenal. Fifteen days later, he scored his first goal, an overhead kick against rivals Birmingham City, to put Villa back into the lead as they went on to win the match 3–1.

On 19 September 2007, Cahill joined Championship team Sheffield United on a three-month loan deal. He made his debut in a 3–2 away defeat at Crystal Palace three days later, and scored his first goal for the Blades as the only one of a win at Stoke City on 10 November. On 27 November, he scored again in a 0–3 win at Charlton Athletic. Under the terms of his loan agreement, Cahill returned to Villa Park in mid-December 2007 having made 16 appearances and scoring two goals.

Speculation surrounded Cahill's future in the January 2008 transfer window, with Birmingham City, Bolton Wanderers and Turkish club Beşiktaş all reportedly showing an interest.

=== Bolton Wanderers ===
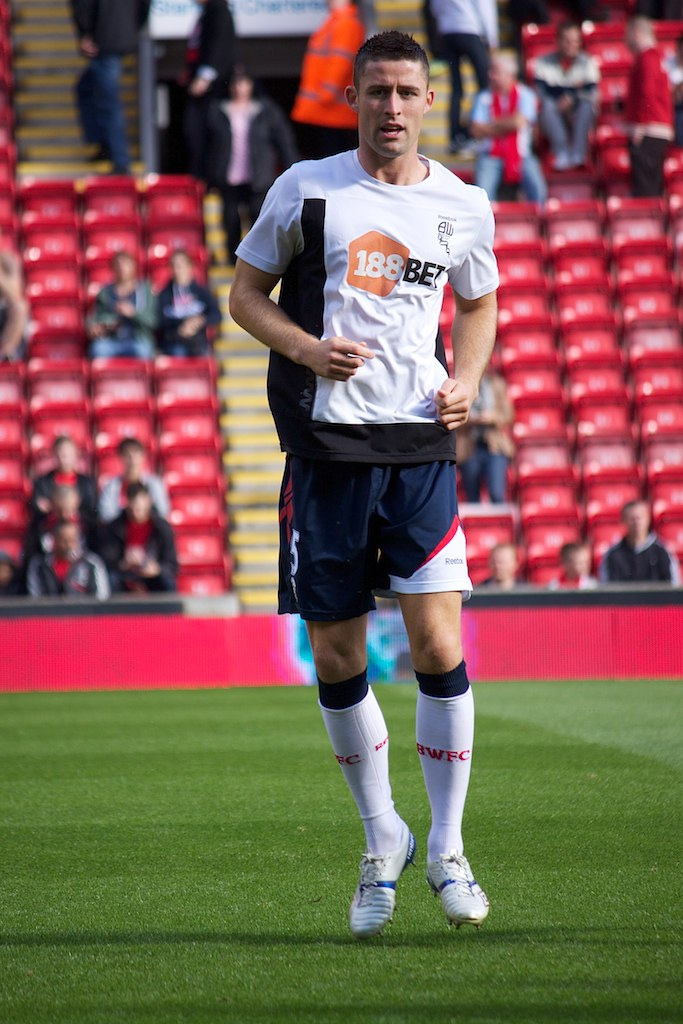
Cahill warming up for Bolton Wanderers in 2011

Bolton scout Colin Harvey was impressed by Cahill and on 30 January 2008, Cahill joined them on a three-and-a-half-year deal. Three days later, he made his debut for Bolton in their 0–2 victory over Reading away at the Madejski Stadium.

Cahill was sent off on 26 August 2008 in the second round of the League Cup, receiving a straight red card in the 38th minute for a foul on Giles Coke as the team lost 1–2 at home to Northampton Town. On 5 October, Cahill scored his first Bolton goal in a 1–3 victory at West Ham United, and he added two more over the campaign in 4–1 wins over Sunderland and Middlesbrough.

In August 2009, 18 months after joining Bolton, Cahill signed a new three-year contract with the club. He suffered a blood clot in his left arm after a training injury which forced him to pull out of the home match against Fulham on 6 February 2010; he spent the weekend in hospital. The treatment for the ailment meant that Cahill could not play for a number of months. He nonetheless cemented his place at the heart of the Bolton defence in the 2010–11 season, making 36 Premier League appearances and scoring three goals, all of which came at home.

On 13 August 2011, Cahill scored on the opening day of the 2011–12 Premier League season against Queens Park Rangers at Loftus Road in a 4–0 victory from 25 yards out in the 45th minute. In December 2011, before the January transfer window, Bolton manager Owen Coyle admitted that Cahill may be sold as his contract will expire at the end of the 2011–12 season. Coyle said, "If he [Cahill] does move, there is no doubt there will be top clubs clamouring for Gary." This led much speculation that Cahill could move to higher-placed clubs like Arsenal, Chelsea, Manchester United or Tottenham Hotspur, all of which showed interest. On 23 December, Coyle confirmed that they had started negotiations with Chelsea about a possible transfer, and a week later a transfer fee was agreed. Despite being on the brink of joining Chelsea, Cahill continued to play for Bolton, scoring the crucial goal in the 1–2 away win against Everton at Goodison Park on 4 January 2012. Two days after that, Coyle said that Cahill was not going to play in their FA Cup clash against Macclesfield Town, as it would leave him cup-tied for Chelsea.

=== Chelsea ===
==== 2011–12 season ====
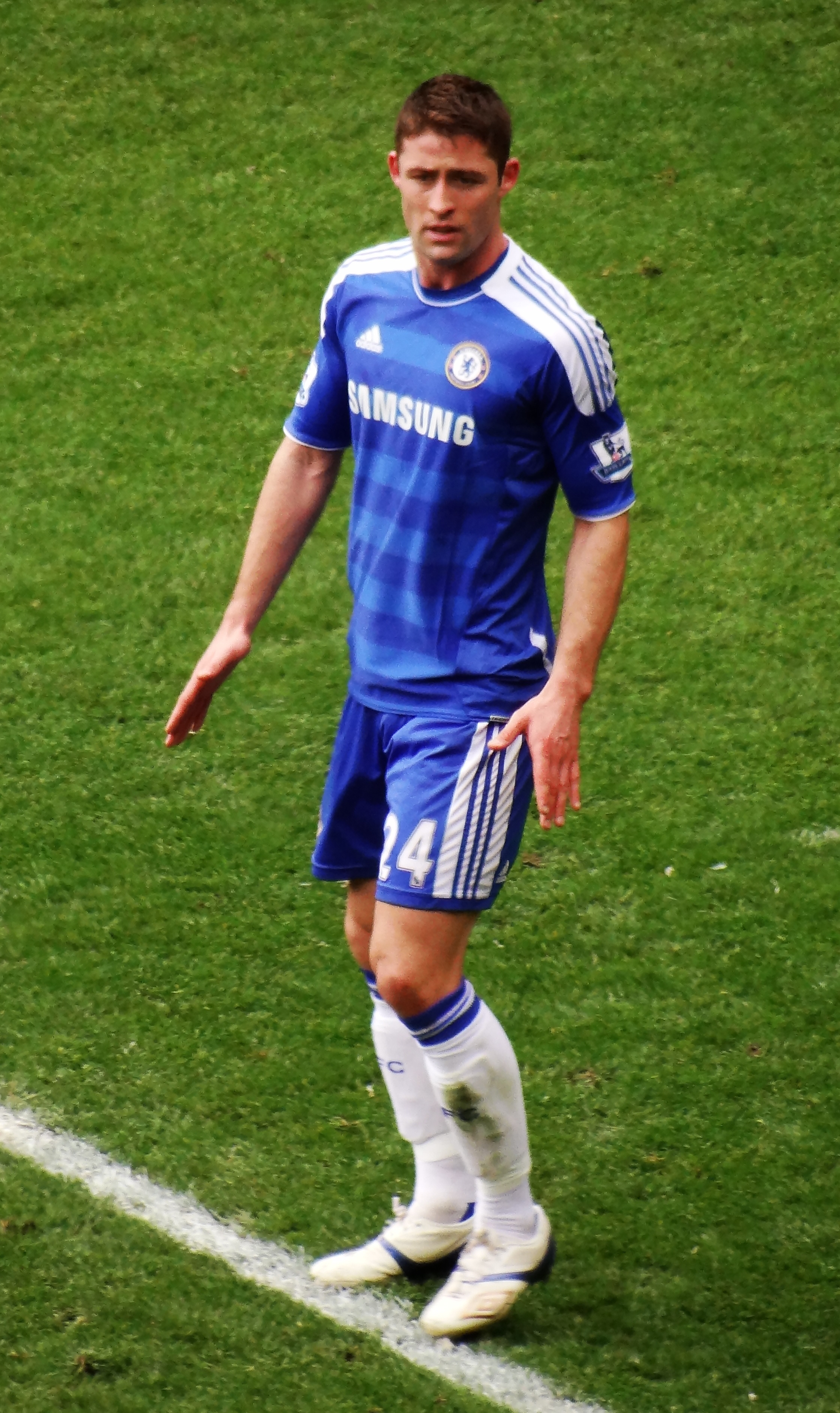
Cahill playing for Chelsea in 2012

After more than two weeks, the clubs had agreed a fee for him, and on 16 January 2012 Cahill signed for Chelsea for what was believed to be around the region of £7 million, and the negotiating of personal terms. Cahill told the club's official website, "Chelsea is a massive club, it is a club that looks to win trophies season in season out and it is a big opportunity for me to be a part of that. Opportunities like this you can't turn down." He also thanked his former club and their fans, saying, "This is the right move for me at the right time and I would like to thank everyone at Bolton because I've had a great four years at the football club. My spell with Wanderers has enabled me to break into the England squad, and I would particularly like to thank the fans for their support along the way. I always appreciated their backing." He was one of Chelsea's unused substitutes in their 1–0 away victory in the 2011–12 FA Cup against West London rivals Queens Park Rangers on 28 January 2012. On 5 February, Cahill made his debut for Chelsea in the 3–3 draw against Manchester United at Stamford Bridge. On 18 March 2012, he scored his first goal in a Chelsea shirt against Leicester City in the FA Cup, a 5–2 win. Cahill scored when he rose above Wes Morgan to head the ball from six yards from a Juan Mata corner, before unveiling the word's "PRAY 4 MUAMBA" on his inner T-shirt, in support of his former Bolton teammate Fabrice Muamba, who had collapsed in a match the day before. He scored his first league goal for the club in the following match, opening the scoring in a 2–1 away defeat to Manchester City. He made a substitute appearance in a 5–1 victory in the FA Cup semi-final against Tottenham Hotspur, after David Luiz was taken off injured.

Cahill started Chelsea's UEFA Champions League semi-final first leg against Barcelona because of the injury picked up by David Luiz in the FA Cup semi-final. The match finished 1–0, with Cahill making some crucial tackles in the second half. In the sixth minute of the second leg, Cahill stretched to win the ball and went down with a hamstring injury. Although he tried to run it off, he eventually had to be replaced by José Bosingwa in the 13th minute. Chelsea went on to win 3–2 on aggregate and set up a meeting with Bayern Munich at the Allianz Arena in the 2012 UEFA Champions League Final. Chelsea went on to win the season's FA Cup, beating Liverpool 2–1 at Wembley Stadium in the final, although Cahill missed the match with a hamstring injury. With the suspensions of both defenders John Terry and Branislav Ivanović, questions arose whether Cahill, along with David Luiz, would be fit for the UEFA Champions League Final to fill the gap. On 15 May 2012, he completed his first full training session after three weeks. "We've worked really hard, all day, afternoons, and I'm fortunate enough to be back," he said. "Hopefully, I'll be fit, I will be fit, and hopefully I'll be out there if selected." He started the match and was part of the squad that defeated Bayern on penalties in the 2012 UEFA Champions League Final, giving Chelsea their first ever UEFA Champions League title. He received praise for his performance especially, as he was still suffering from the injury sustained during the semi-final's second leg. During his first half-season at Stamford Bridge, Cahill appeared in 19 matches, scoring two goals and providing one assist in 1,596 minutes on the pitch.

==== 2012–13 season ====
Cahill scored on his first appearance of the season in a 4–2 win against Reading on 22 August 2012. On 31 August, he scored in the 2012 UEFA Super Cup against Atlético Madrid, which Chelsea lost 4–1. On 5 December 2012, Cahill scored his first UEFA Champions League goal, coming against Nordsjælland in a 6–1 home rout. On 16 December 2012, Cahill was sent-off against Corinthians in Chelsea's 1–0 2012 FIFA Club World Cup Final defeat after a clash with Emerson. In January 2013, Cahill did not feature in the league match against Stoke City due to the birth of his son, Leo. On 15 May, he started the 2013 UEFA Europa League Final against Benfica and made a vital last-ditch tackle in the final moments to ensure that Chelsea won the match 2–1.

==== 2013–14 season ====
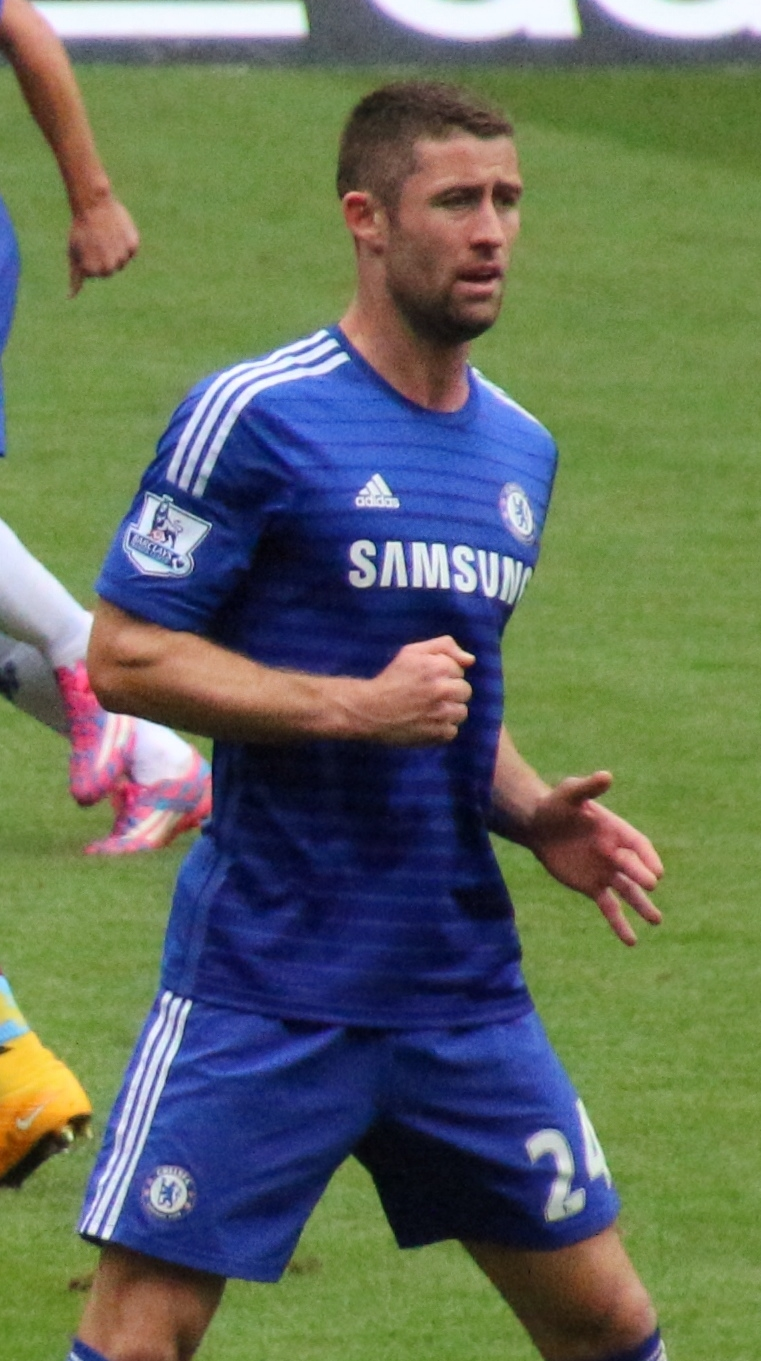
Cahill playing for Chelsea in 2014

Cahill made his season debut in José Mourinho's first match back as Chelsea manager, helping them keep a clean sheet in a 2–0 victory over newly promoted Hull City on 18 August 2013. Twelve days later, Cahill picked up his first yellow card of the season as Chelsea fell to Bayern Munich on penalty kicks after the teams played out a 2–2 draw in the 2013 UEFA Super Cup, held at the Eden Arena in Prague.

Cahill headed in Chelsea's equaliser in their 3–1 comeback win over Southampton on 1 December 2013, moving within four points of 2013–14 Premier League leaders Arsenal. On 18 March 2014, Cahill scored on a rebound of a John Terry header, giving Chelsea a 2–0 win over Galatasaray and a spot in the last eight of the 2013–14 UEFA Champions League. This match also marked Cahill's 100th appearance in a Chelsea shirt since his January 2012 move to Stamford Bridge. At the PFA Awards ceremony on 27 April 2014, Cahill was unveiled as a member of the 2013–14 PFA Team of the Year along with Chelsea teammates Petr Čech and Eden Hazard.

==== 2014–15 season ====
By 18 October 2014, Cahill was the only Chelsea player to play every minute of their 2014–15 campaign so far. On 8 November, he scored his first Premier League goal of the season against Liverpool, the equaliser in Chelsea's 2-1 win at Anfield. On 24 January 2015, Cahill scored the opener against Bradford City in an FA Cup match, but in the end Chelsea crashed out of the tournament after a 4–2 defeat, which ended their hopes of winning a quadruple this season.

Cahill started for Chelsea as they beat rivals Tottenham Hotspur 2–0 at Wembley Stadium in the 2015 League Cup Final. He won the Premier League title with Chelsea that season, as they finished first with 87 points. He was one of six Chelsea players named in the 2014–15 PFA Team of the Year.

==== 2015–16 season ====
On 2 August 2015, Cahill made his first appearance of the season in Chelsea's 1–0 defeat at Wembley Stadium in the 2015 FA Community Shield against London rivals Arsenal. On 24 October 2015, Cahill scored his first goal of the season against West Ham United in a 2–1 defeat as Chelsea suffered their fifth defeat in ten matches. On 2 December 2015, Cahill signed a new four-year deal at Chelsea, keeping him at the club until 2019.

==== 2016–17 season ====
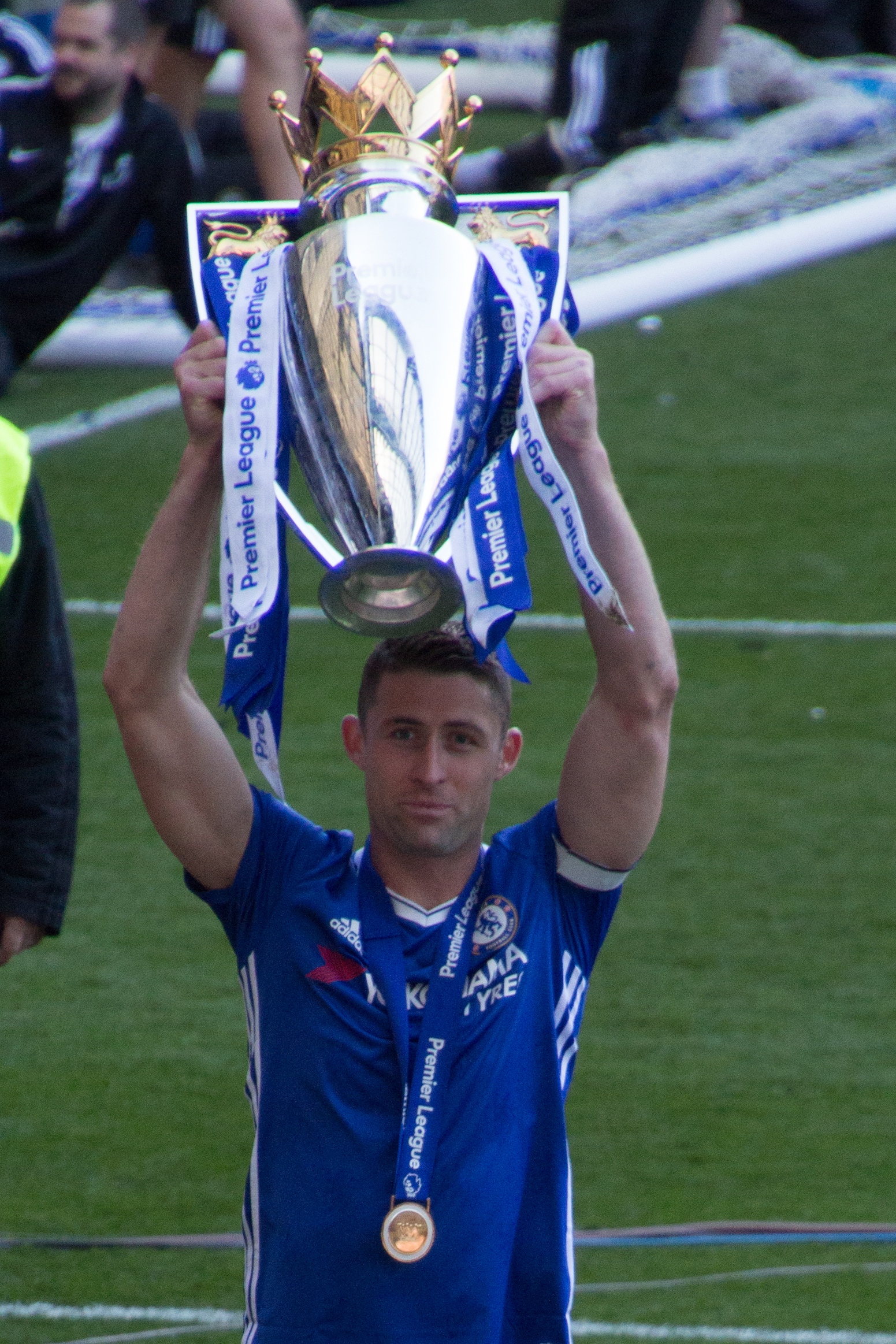
Cahill with the 2016–17 Premier League trophy

Under new management in Antonio Conte, Cahill continued his partnership with John Terry in defence at the start of the season. On 27 August 2016, Cahill made his 200th appearance for Chelsea at home against Burnley, helping his team to earn a clean-sheet for this first time during the season in a 3–0 victory. On 20 September 2016, with Terry injured and Ivanović being rested, Cahill captained Chelsea for the first time that season, and scored his first goal of the season in a 4–2 win over Leicester City during the third round of the EFL Cup.

On 23 October 2016, Cahill continued to serve as captain with Terry on the bench. He scored his second goal of the season and the second goal of the match in a 4–0 win over former manager José Mourinho's Manchester United at Stamford Bridge. On 26 October 2016, Chelsea lost 2–1 to West Ham United in an EFL Cup match, with Cahill scoring a consolation goal for the Blues in the 94th minute. On 31 December 2016, Cahill headed in Chelsea's first goal in a 4–2 Premier League win against Stoke City, in the process helping Chelsea to a 13th consecutive league win, a club record for the Blues.

On 18 March 2017, Cahill scored the winning goal in a 2–1 away victory at Stoke City, having also scored in the reverse fixture against Stoke earlier in the season. The win sent Chelsea 13 points clear at the top of the table, with 10 fixtures remaining. On 20 April 2017, Cahill was named in the PFA Team of the Year for the third time in his career. On 25 April 2017, Cahill scored Chelsea's second goal in a 4–2 Premier League win over Southampton, at Stamford Bridge, to help maintain Chelsea's seven-point lead at the top of the Premier League.

==== 2017–18 season ====
On 26 July 2017, Cahill was appointed as the Chelsea club captain ahead of the 2017–18 season, following John Terry's departure. On 12 August 2017, in the first match of Chelsea's 2017–18 season against Burnley at Stamford Bridge, Cahill was sent off in the 13th minute of the match for a reckless studs-up challenge on Burnley midfielder Steven Defour, culminating in a sequence of events that saw Chelsea begin their title defence with a shock 3–2 defeat to a Burnley team that had only won once away from home in the previous season. Cahill was suspended for Chelsea's league matches against rivals Tottenham Hotspur, Everton and Leicester City. He captained Chelsea to victory at Wembley Stadium in the 2018 FA Cup Final, his team beating Manchester United 1–0.

==== 2018–19 season ====
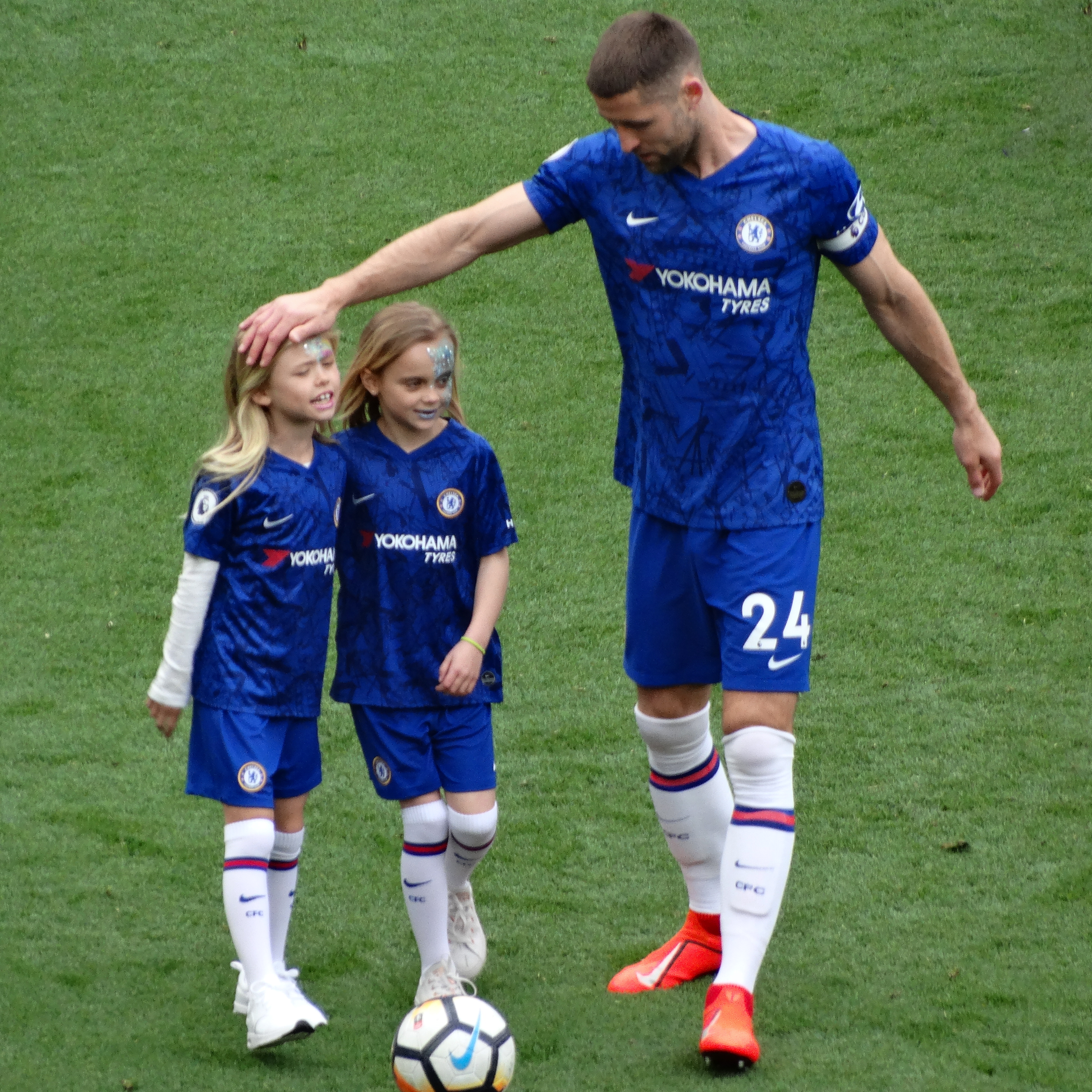
Cahill after his last Chelsea appearance at Stamford Bridge

After making just nine first-team appearances all season under new manager Maurizio Sarri, Cahill confirmed he would leave Chelsea at the end of the campaign. He made his last appearance in the last home match of the season, coming on as an 88th-minute substitute against Watford in the Premier League, a game Chelsea won 3–0.

=== Crystal Palace ===
Cahill signed for Premier League club Crystal Palace on 5 August 2019 on a two-year contract, re-uniting him with his former England manager Roy Hodgson. He made his debut in an away 2–1 victory over Manchester United on 24 August. On 2 February 2021, he scored his first goal for Crystal Palace with the winner against Newcastle United. On 1 August 2021, Cahill announced via social media that he had left the club following the expiration of his contract. He made 45 league appearances across two seasons for the club, scoring once.

=== AFC Bournemouth ===
Cahill signed for Championship club AFC Bournemouth on 20 August 2021 on a one-year contract. He was part of a defensive deployment conceding just twice in September 2021, winning him the club's Player of the Month award. Having not appeared because of a red card at the end of January 2022 and due to the loan signing of Nathaniel Phillips, Cahill was released at the end of the season following a subsequent promotion to the Premier League.

On 16 November 2022, he announced his retirement from professional football, ending an 18-year long career with over 450 league appearances.

== International career ==
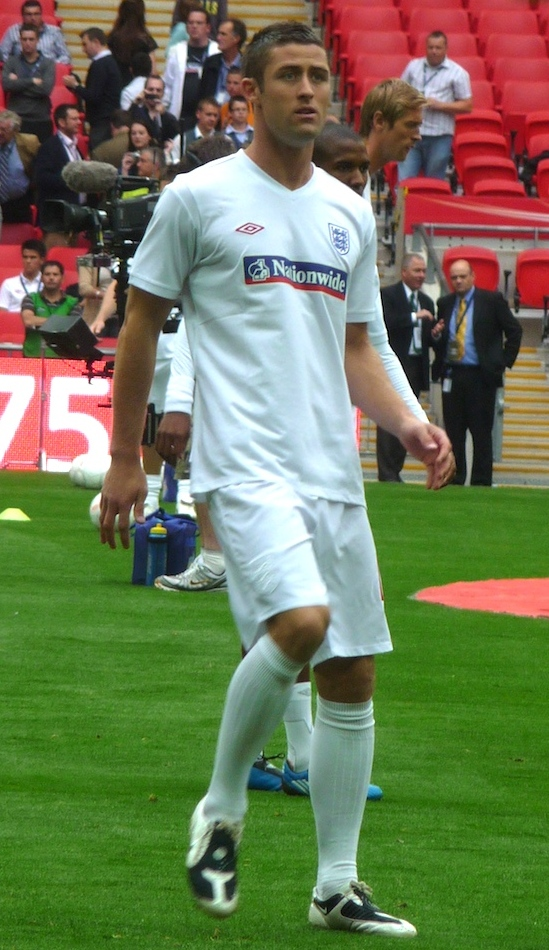
Cahill warming up for England in 2009

Capped three times by England under-20s, Cahill was one of a number of players in Stuart Pearce's first squad as England U21 coach to receive their first U21 call-up, though he did not feature in the match, which was played on 6 February 2007, against Spain. His first under-21 cap for England was the first match at the new Wembley Stadium, where he partnered Anton Ferdinand at the centre of the England defence. His final of three caps came in the 2007 UEFA European Under-21 Championship, where he made one appearance.

Cahill was called up to the England squad for the match against Kazakhstan on 4 June 2009 following the withdrawal of Rio Ferdinand, but had to wait over a year for his first cap, until he came on as a second-half substitute for Michael Dawson on 3 September 2010 against Bulgaria in a 4–0 win at Wembley Stadium. In doing so, he became the first Bolton Wanderers player to play for England since Michael Ricketts in 2002. On 29 March 2011, Cahill made his first start for the national team against Ghana in a friendly that ended 1–1.

Until Cahill played for England, he was also eligible to play for the Republic of Ireland through an Irish grandparent. However, his manager at Bolton and former Ireland international, Owen Coyle, said that Cahill only wanted to represent England.

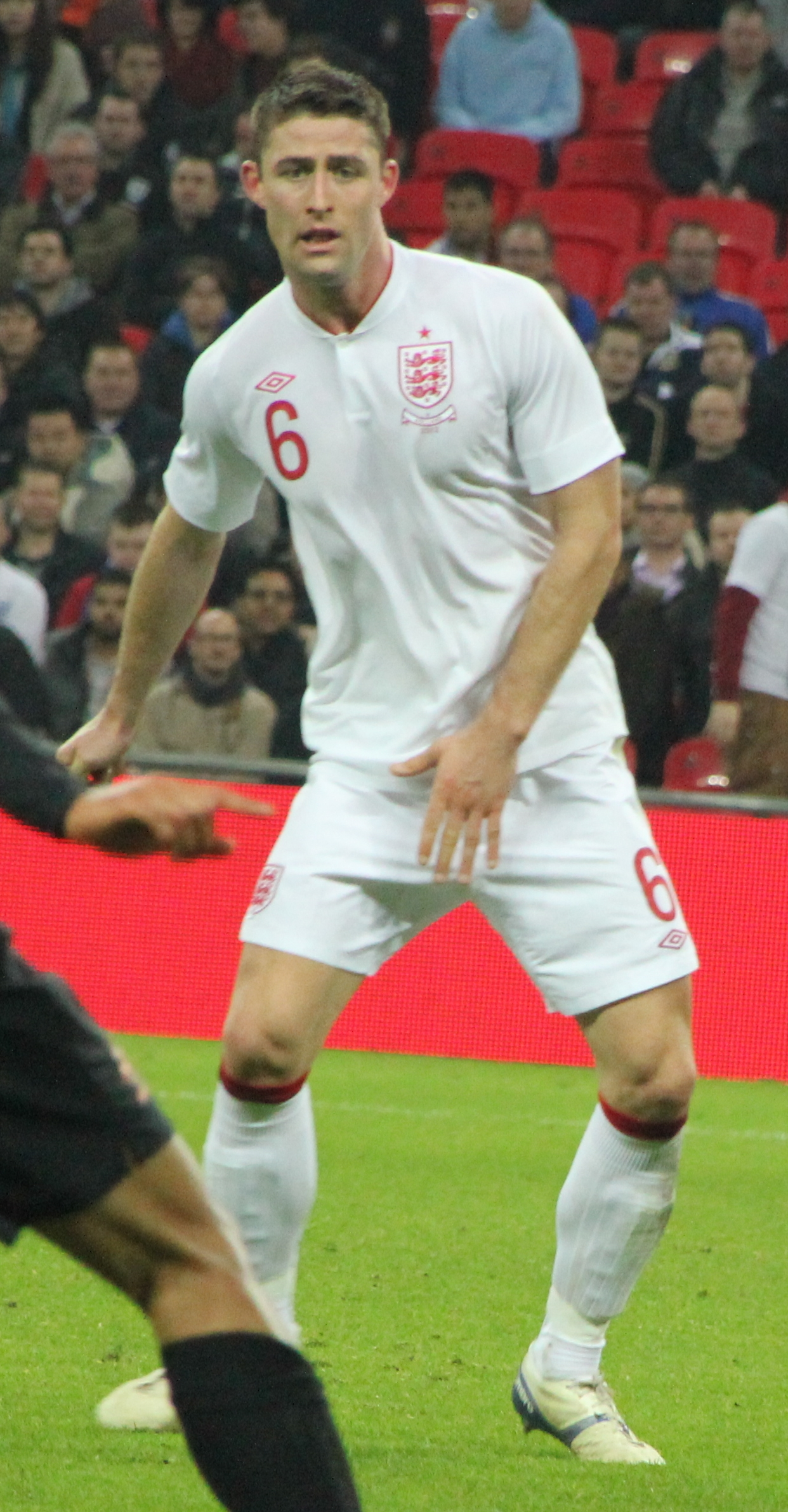
Cahill playing for England in 2012

On 2 September 2011, in his first competitive start, Cahill scored his first international goal for England against Bulgaria in the qualifying rounds of UEFA Euro 2012 in the 13th minute. In netting the opening goal, Cahill became the first Bolton player to score for England since Ray Parry against Northern Ireland in 1959.

On 29 February 2012, Cahill scored a goal at Wembley Stadium against the Netherlands to make the score 1–2, with England eventually losing 2–3.

On 16 May 2012, he was named in new England manager Roy Hodgson's UEFA Euro 2012 squad. On 2 June, during a 1–0 friendly win against Belgium at Wembley Stadium, he was pushed by Belgium player Dries Mertens and collided with England goalkeeper Joe Hart, and was ruled out of Euro 2012 with a broken jaw. He was replaced by Liverpool defender Martin Kelly.

Cahill headed in Leighton Baines' corner to score his third international goal in a 3–0 win over Peru on 30 May 2014 at Wembley Stadium.

On 12 May 2014, Cahill was named in the 23-man England squad for the 2014 FIFA World Cup. He started all three matches as England were eliminated at the group stage. In September 2014, he was named England's vice-captain to Wayne Rooney, after the international retirements of Steven Gerrard and Frank Lampard. On 9 October 2015, with the team already qualified, he captained England for the first time in a 2–0 home win over Estonia in UEFA Euro 2016 qualifying.

Cahill was called up to the 23-man cohort for UEFA Euro 2016. He played every minute of their campaign, skippering the side in the final Group B match, against Slovakia.

Cahill was named in the 23-man England squad for the 2018 FIFA World Cup. He made one appearance in the tournament, in the dead rubber match against Belgium in Group G.

On 28 August 2018, Cahill "stepped aside" from the England national team, telling manager Gareth Southgate that he did not want to be considered for selection unless there was an injury crisis.

== Style of play ==
Cahill was known for his technical ability, powerful heading in defence and attack, volleying, and good tackling. The centre-back also had an impressive goal-scoring record from defence. Former Chelsea manager André Villas-Boas said of Cahill, "I think his technical attributes are immense and his pace is fantastic." Despite being a defender, Cahill was noted for his technical ability and distribution, and occasionally, for his finishing prowess, and strength with his head. A quick, consistent and reliable centreback, Cahill was also known for his positioning and his ability to read the game.

== Career statistics ==
=== Club ===
Appearances and goals by club, season and competition
Club	Season	League			FA Cup		League Cup		Europe		Other		Total	
Club	Season	Division	Apps	Goals	Apps	Goals	Apps	Goals	Apps	Goals	Apps	Goals	Apps	Goals
Aston Villa	2004–05	Premier League	0	0	—		0	0	—		—		0	0
Aston Villa	2005–06	Premier League	7	1	0	0	1	0	—		—		8	1
Aston Villa	2006–07	Premier League	20	0	1	0	0	0	—		—		21	0
Aston Villa	2007–08	Premier League	1	0	0	0	1	0	—		—		2	0
Aston Villa	Total		28	1	1	0	2	0	—		—		31	1
Burnley (loan)	2004–05	Championship	27	1	4	0	1	0	—		—		32	1
Sheffield United (loan)	2007–08	Championship	16	2	—		—		—		—		16	2
Bolton Wanderers	2007–08	Premier League	13	0	—		—		4 (Note: Appearances in UEFA Cup)	0	—		17	0
Bolton Wanderers	2008–09	Premier League	33	3	0	0	1	0	—		—		34	3
Bolton Wanderers	2009–10	Premier League	29	5	2	1	3	1	—		—		34	7
Bolton Wanderers	2010–11	Premier League	36	3	5	0	0	0	—		—		41	3
Bolton Wanderers	2011–12	Premier League	19	2	0	0	2	0	—		—		21	2
Bolton Wanderers	Total		130	13	7	1	6	1	4	0	—		147	15
Chelsea	2011–12	Premier League	10	1	4	1	—		5 (Note: Appearances in UEFA Champions League)	0	—		19	2
Chelsea	2012–13	Premier League	26	2	4	0	4	2	8 (Note: Four appearances and one goal in UEFA Champions League, four appearances in UEFA Europa League)	1	3 (Note: One appearance and one goal in UEFA Super Cup, two appearances in FIFA Club World Cup)	1	45	6
Chelsea	2013–14	Premier League	30	1	3	0	3	0	10	1	1 (Note: Appearance in UEFA Super Cup)	0	47	2
Chelsea	2014–15	Premier League	36	1	2	1	4	0	6	1	—		48	3
Chelsea	2015–16	Premier League	23	2	4	1	2	0	7	1	1 (Note: Appearance in FA Community Shield)	0	37	4
Chelsea	2016–17	Premier League	37	6	3	0	3	2	—		—		43	8
Chelsea	2017–18	Premier League	27	0	6	0	3	0	6	0	1	0	43	0
Chelsea	2018–19	Premier League	2	0	0	0	2	0	4 (Note: Appearances in UEFA Europa League)	0	0	0	8	0
Chelsea	Total		191	13	26	3	21	4	46	4	6	1	290	25
Crystal Palace	2019–20	Premier League	25	0	1	0	1	0	—		—		27	0
Crystal Palace	2020–21	Premier League	20	1	0	0	0	0	—		—		20	1
Crystal Palace	Total		45	1	1	0	1	0	—		—		47	1
AFC Bournemouth	2021–22	Championship	22	0	0	0	0	0	—		—		22	0
Career total			459	31	39	4	31	5	50	4	6	1	585	45

=== International ===
Appearances and goals by national team and year
National team	Year	Apps	Goals
England	2010	1	0
England	2011	6	1
England	2012	5	1
England	2013	9	0
England	2014	12	1
England	2015	7	0
England	2016	12	1
England	2017	6	0
England	2018	3	1
Total		61	5

England score listed first, score column indicates score after each Cahill goal

List of international goals scored by Gary Cahill
No.	Date	Venue	Cap	Opponent	Score	Result	Competition	Ref.
1	2 September 2011	Vasil Levski National Stadium, Sofia, Bulgaria	4	Bulgaria	1–0	3–0	UEFA Euro 2012 qualification	
2	29 February 2012	Wembley Stadium, London, England	8	Netherlands	1–2	2–3	Friendly	
3	30 May 2014	Wembley Stadium, London, England	23	Peru	2–0	3–0	Friendly	
4	11 November 2016	Wembley Stadium, London, England	51	Scotland	3–0	3–0	2018 FIFA World Cup qualification	
5	2 June 2018	Wembley Stadium, London, England	59	Nigeria	1–0	2–1	Friendly	

== Honours ==
Chelsea

- Premier League: 2014–15, 2016–17
- FA Cup: 2011–12, 2017–18; runner-up: 2016–17
- Football League Cup: 2014–15
- UEFA Champions League: 2011–12
- UEFA Europa League: 2012–13, 2018–19
- FIFA Club World Cup runner-up: 2012

Bournemouth

- EFL Championship runner-up: 2021–22

Individual

- PFA Team of the Year: 2013–14 Premier League, 2014–15 Premier League, 2016–17 Premier League
- Bolton Wanderers Players' Player of the Year: 2008–09

Sporting positions
Preceded by John Terry	Chelsea F.C. captain 2017–2019	Succeeded by César Azpilicueta
