= 2003–04 Liverpool F.C. season =

English football club season

Liverpool
2003–04 season
- Chairman: David Moores
- Manager: Gérard Houllier
- FA Premier League: 4th
- FA Cup: Fifth round
- League Cup: Fourth round
- UEFA Cup: Fourth round
- Top goalscorer: League: Michael Owen (16); All: Michael Owen (19)
- Average home league attendance: 41,777
Home colours	Away colours	Third colours

The 2003–04 season was Liverpool's 112th season in existence and their 42nd consecutive year in the top-flight. The season covers the period from 1 July 2003 to 30 June 2004. Liverpool finished the FA Premier League season in fourth place.

== Season summary ==
Liverpool finished the season in fourth position in the Premier League in what was to be Gérard Houllier's last in charge of Liverpool. He was replaced by Rafael Benítez at the end of the season after six years in charge.

Competition	Result	Top Scorer
Premier League	4th	(England) Michael Owen, 16
UEFA Cup	Fourth round	(Australia) Harry Kewell, 3
FA Cup	Fifth round	(France) Bruno Cheyrou, 2
League Cup	Fourth round	(England) Emile Heskey, 2 (England) Danny Murphy, 2
Overall		(England) Michael Owen, 19

== Players ==
=== First-team squad ===
Note: Flags indicate national team as defined under FIFA eligibility rules; some limited exceptions apply. Players may hold more than one non-FIFA nationality.

No.	Pos.	Nation	Player
1	GK	POL	Jerzy Dudek
2	DF	SUI	Stéphane Henchoz
3	DF	IRL	Steve Finnan
4	DF	FIN	Sami Hyypiä
5	FW	CZE	Milan Baroš
6	DF	GER	Markus Babbel
7	MF	AUS	Harry Kewell
8	FW	ENG	Emile Heskey
9	FW	SEN	El Hadji Diouf
10	FW	ENG	Michael Owen
11	MF	CZE	Vladimír Šmicer
13	MF	ENG	Danny Murphy
15	MF	SEN	Salif Diao

No.	Pos.	Nation	Player
16	MF	GER	Dietmar Hamann
17	MF	ENG	Steven Gerrard
18	DF	NOR	John Arne Riise
20	MF	FRA	Anthony Le Tallec
21	DF	FRA	Djimi Traoré (Note: Traoré was born in Saint-Ouen, France, but also qualified to represent Mali internationally and would make his international debut for Mali in October 2004.)
22	GK	ENG	Chris Kirkland
23	DF	ENG	Jamie Carragher
24	FW	FRA	Florent Sinama Pongolle
25	MF	CRO	Igor Bišćan
28	DF	FRA	Bruno Cheyrou
29	GK	FRA	Patrice Luzi
32	MF	ENG	John Welsh
36	DF	ENG	Jon Otsemobor

=== Left club during season ===
Note: Flags indicate national team as defined under FIFA eligibility rules; some limited exceptions apply. Players may hold more than one non-FIFA nationality.

No. / Pos. / Nation / Player; 7 / FW / FIN / Daniel Sjölund (to Djurgårdens IF)	No. / Pos. / Nation / Player; 12 / GK / WAL / Paul Jones (on loan from Southampton)

=== Reserve squad ===
The following players did not appear for the first team this season.

Note: Flags indicate national team as defined under FIFA eligibility rules; some limited exceptions apply. Players may hold more than one non-FIFA nationality.

No.	Pos.	Nation	Player
26	MF	IRL	Richie Partridge
27	DF	FRA	Grégory Vignal
30	DF	FRA	Carl Medjani (Note: Medjani was born in Lyon, France, but also qualified to represent Algeria internationally through his father and would make his international debut for Algeria in 2010.)
31	MF	FRA	Alou Diarra
33	FW	ENG	Neil Mellor
34	MF	IRL	Darren Potter (Note: Potter was born in Liverpool, England, but also qualified to represent the Republic of Ireland internationally and represented them at youth level before making his international debut for the Republic of Ireland in May 2007.)
35	DF	ENG	Stephen Warnock
37	DF	USA	Zak Whitbread
38	MF	IRL	Michael Foley-Sheridan
40	GK	ENG	Paul Harrison
—	DF	ENG	Danny O'Donnell

No.	Pos.	Nation	Player
—	DF	ENG	Lee Peltier
—	DF	ENG	James Smith
—	DF	ENG	Calum Woods
—	MF	SCO	Robbie Foy
—	MF	ENG	Danny Guthrie
—	MF	ENG	David Mannix
—	MF	ENG	Jason Massie
—	MF	ENG	Mark Smyth
—	FW	ENG	Steven Gillespie
—	FW	ENG	Conal Platt

== Transfers ==
=== In ===
#	Pos	Player	From	Fee	Date
20	MF	(France) Anthony Le Tallec	(France) Le Havre	£1,500,000	1 July 2003
24	FW	(France) Florent Sinama Pongolle	(France) Le Havre	£1,500,000	1 July 2003
3	DF	(Republic of Ireland) Steve Finnan	(England) Fulham	£3,500,000	1 July 2003
7	MF	(Australia) Harry Kewell	(England) Leeds United	£5,000,000	9 July 2003
30	DF	(France) Carl Medjani	(France) Saint-Étienne	Free	8 August 2003
12	GK	(Wales) Paul Jones	(England) Southampton	Loan	9 January 2004

=== Out ===
#	Pos	Player	To	Fee	Date
15	MF	(Czech Republic) Patrik Berger	(England) Portsmouth	Free	1 July 2003
24	MF	(France) Bernard Diomède	(France) Ajaccio	Free	1 July 2003
14	DF	(Norway) Vegard Heggem	Unattached	Free	1 July 2003
19	GK	(Guadeloupe) Pegguy Arphexad	(England) Coventry City	Free	1 July 2003
34	FW	(Finland) Daniel Sjölund	(Sweden) Djurgårdens IF	Free	15 January 2004
3	DF	(Portugal) Abel Xavier (Note: Xavier was born in Nampula, Portuguese Mozambique (now Mozambique), which was then an overseas territory of Portugal, and made his international debut for Portugal in March 1993.)	(Germany) Hannover 96	Free	2 February 2004
8	FW	(England) Emile Heskey	(England) Birmingham City	£6,250,000	18 May 2004

- In: ▲£6,500,000
- Out: ▼£6,250,000
- Total spending: ▲£250,000

== Competitions ==
=== Premier League ===
==== League table ====
Pos	Team	Pld	W	D	L	GF	GA	GD	Pts	Qualification or relegation
2	Chelsea	38	24	7	7	67	30	+37	79	Qualification for the Champions League group stage
3	Manchester United	38	23	6	9	64	35	+29	75	Qualification for the Champions League third qualifying round (Note: Since Manchester United qualified for the Champions League, their place in the UEFA Cup as 2003–04 FA Cup winners went to First Division club Millwall, who were the FA Cup runners-up.)
4	Liverpool	38	16	12	10	55	37	+18	60	Qualification for the Champions League third qualifying round
5	Newcastle United	38	13	17	8	52	40	+12	56	Qualification for the UEFA Cup first round
6	Aston Villa	38	15	11	12	48	44	+4	56	

Source: Premier League
Rules for classification: 1) points; 2) goal difference; 3) number of goals scored.

==== Results summary ====
Overall								Home						Away					
Pld	W	D	L	GF	GA	GD	Pts	W	D	L	GF	GA	GD	W	D	L	GF	GA	GD
38	16	12	10	55	37	+18	60	10	4	5	29	15	+14	6	8	5	26	22	+4

==== Big Four games ====
Overall								Home						Away					
Pld	W	D	L	GF	GA	GD	Pts	W	D	L	GF	GA	GD	W	D	L	GF	GA	GD
6	2	0	4	7	10	−3	6	0	0	3	3	6	−3	2	0	1	4	4	0

==== Results by round ====
Round	1	2	3	4	5	6	7	8	9	10	11	12	13	14	15	16	17	18	19	20	21	22	23	24	25	26	27	28	29	30	31	32	33	34	35	36	37	38
Ground	H	A	H	A	A	H	A	H	A	H	A	H	A	H	A	H	H	A	A	H	A	A	H	A	H	A	A	H	H	A	H	A	H	H	A	H	A	H
Result	L	D	D	W	W	W	L	L	L	W	W	L	D	W	D	L	W	D	W	W	L	D	D	D	W	D	L	W	W	D	W	L	L	D	W	W	W	D
Position	16	17	16	10	8	7	7	8	11	10	8	8	9	6	5	9	9	7	7	5	5	5	5	6	4	4	4	5	4	4	4	4	5	5	5	4	4	4

Source: Competitive Matches
A = Away; H = Home; W = Win; D = Draw; L = Loss

==== Matches ====
The league fixtures were announced on 26 June 2003.

17 August 2003 1	Liverpool	1–2	Chelsea	Liverpool
16:05	Owen 79' (pen.)	Report	Verón 25'; Hasselbaink 87'	Stadium: Anfield; Attendance: 44,082; Referee: Steve Bennett

24 August 2003 2	Aston Villa	0–0	Liverpool	Birmingham
		Report		Stadium: Villa Park; Attendance: 42,573; Referee: Paul Durkin

27 August 2003 3	Liverpool	0–0	Tottenham Hotspur	Liverpool
		Report		Stadium: Anfield; Attendance: 43,778; Referee: Uriah Rennie

30 August 2003 4	Everton	0–3	Liverpool	Liverpool
		Report	Owen 39', 52'; Kewell 80'	Stadium: Goodison Park; Attendance: 40,200; Referee: Mike Riley

12 September 2003 5	Blackburn Rovers	1–3	Liverpool	Blackburn
	Jansen 8'; Neill (red card) 45'	Report	Owen 12' (pen.), 68'; Kewell 90'	Stadium: Ewood Park; Attendance: 30,074; Referee: Neale Barry

20 September 2003 6	Liverpool	2–1	Leicester City	Liverpool
	Owen 20' (pen.); Heskey 75'	Report	Bent 90'	Stadium: Anfield; Attendance: 44,094; Referee: Mark Halsey

28 September 2003 7	Charlton Athletic	3–2	Liverpool	London
	Lisbie 31', 43', 83'	Report	Šmicer 15'; Owen 52' (pen.)	Stadium: The Valley; Attendance: 26,508; Referee: Rob Styles

4 October 2003 8	Liverpool	1–2	Arsenal	Liverpool
	Kewell 14'	Report	Hyypiä 31' (o.g.); Pires 68'	Stadium: Anfield; Attendance: 44,374; Referee: Graham Barber

18 October 2003 9	Portsmouth	1–0	Liverpool	Portsmouth
	Berger 4'	Report		Stadium: Fratton Park; Attendance: 20,123; Referee: Steve Dunn

25 October 2003 10	Liverpool	3–1	Leeds United	Liverpool
	Owen 35'; Murphy 57'; Sinama Pongolle 84'	Report	Smith 42'	Stadium: Anfield; Attendance: 43,599; Referee: Jeff Winter

2 November 2003 11	Fulham	1–2	Liverpool	London
	Saha 40'; Boa Morte (red card) 90'	Report	Heskey 17'; Murphy 89' (pen.)	Stadium: Loftus Road; Attendance: 17,682; Referee: Rob Styles

9 November 2003 12	Liverpool	1–2	Manchester United	Liverpool
	Kewell 76'	Report	Giggs 59', 70'	Stadium: Anfield; Attendance: 44,159; Referee: Graham Poll

22 November 2003 13	Middlesbrough	0–0	Liverpool	Middlesbrough
		Report		Stadium: Riverside; Attendance: 34,268; Referee: Phil Dowd

30 November 2003 14	Liverpool	3–1	Birmingham City	Liverpool
	Gerrard 35' (pen.); Kewell 69'; Heskey 78'	Report	Forssell 33'	Stadium: Anfield; Attendance: 42,683; Referee: Neale Barry

6 December 2003 15	Newcastle United	1–1	Liverpool	Newcastle-upon-Tyne
	Shearer 63' (pen.)		Murphy 6'	Stadium: St. James' Park

13 December 2003 16	Liverpool	1–2	Southampton	Liverpool
	Heskey 75'	Report	Ormerod 2'; M. Svensson 64'	Stadium: Anfield; Attendance: 41,762; Referee: Paul Durkin

26 December 2003 17	Liverpool	3–1	Bolton Wanderers	Liverpool
	Hyypiä 30'; Sinama Pongolle 47'; Šmicer 54'	Report	Pedersen 85'	Stadium: Anfield; Attendance: 42,987; Referee: Jeff Winter

28 December 2003 18	Manchester City	2–2	Liverpool	Manchester
	Anelka 30' (pen.); Fowler 90'	Report	Šmicer 66'; Hamann 80'	Stadium: City of Manchester Stadium; Attendance: 47,201; Referee: Mike Riley

7 January 2004 19	Chelsea	0–1	Liverpool	London
		Report	Cheyrou 38'; Diouf (red card)	Stadium: Stamford Bridge; Attendance: 41,420; Referee: Steve Dunn

10 January 2004 20	Liverpool	1–0	Aston Villa	Liverpool
	Delaney 36' (o.g.)	Report		Stadium: Anfield; Attendance: 43,771; Referee: Graham Barber

17 January 2004 21	Tottenham Hotspur	2–1	Liverpool	London
	Keane 25' (pen.); Postiga 54'	Report	Kewell 75'	Stadium: White Hart Lane; Attendance: 36,104; Referee: Uriah Rennie

21 January 2004 22	Wolverhampton Wanderers	1–1	Liverpool	Wolverhampton
	Miller 90'	Report	Cheyrou 34'	Stadium: Molineux; Attendance: 29,380; Referee: Barry Knight

31 January 2004 23	Liverpool	0–0	Everton	Liverpool
		Report		Stadium: Anfield; Attendance: 44,056; Referee: Steve Bennett

7 February 2004 24	Bolton Wanderers	2–2	Liverpool	Bolton
	Hunt 11'; Djorkaeff 58'	Report	Hyypiä 51'; Gerrard 69'	Stadium: Reebok Stadium; Attendance: 27,552; Referee: Alan Wiley

11 February 2004 25	Liverpool	2–1	Manchester City	Liverpool
	Owen 3'; Gerrard 51'	Report	Wright-Phillips 50'	Stadium: Anfield; Attendance: 43,257; Referee: Mike Riley

29 February 2004 26	Leeds United	2–2	Liverpool	Leeds
	Bakke 29'; Viduka 34'	Report	Kewell 21'; Baroš 42'	Stadium: Elland Road; Attendance: 39,932; Referee: Paul Durkin

14 March 2004 27	Southampton	2–0	Liverpool	Southampton
	Beattie 51'; Phillips 85'	Report		Stadium: St. Mary's; Attendance: 32,056; Referee: Dermot Gallagher

17 March 2004 28	Liverpool	3–0	Portsmouth	Liverpool
	Hamann 6'; Owen 28', 55'	Report		Stadium: Anfield; Attendance: 34,663; Referee: Barry Knight

20 March 2004 29	Liverpool	1–0	Wolverhampton Wanderers	Liverpool
	Hyypiä 90+3'	Report		Stadium: Anfield; Attendance: 43,795; Referee: Rob Styles

28 March 2004 30	Leicester City	0–0	Liverpool	Leicester
		Report		Stadium: Walkers Stadium; Attendance: 32,013; Referee: Phil Dowd

4 April 2004 31	Liverpool	4–0	Blackburn Rovers	Liverpool
	Owen 7', 24'; Todd 22' (o.g.); Heskey 79'	Report		Stadium: Anfield; Attendance: 41,559; Referee: Jeff Winter

9 April 2004 32	Arsenal	4–2	Liverpool	London
	Henry 31', 50', 78'; Pires 49'	Report	Hyypiä 5'; Owen 42'	Stadium: Highbury; Attendance: 38,119; Referee: Alan Wiley

12 April 2004 33	Liverpool	0–1	Charlton Athletic	Liverpool
		Report	Bartlett 63'	Stadium: Anfield; Attendance: 40,003; Referee: Phil Dowd

17 April 2004 34	Liverpool	0–0	Fulham	Liverpool
		Report		Stadium: Anfield; Attendance: 42,042; Referee: Steve Bennett

24 April 2004 35	Manchester United	0–1	Liverpool	Manchester
		Report	Murphy 65' (pen.)	Stadium: Old Trafford; Attendance: 67,647; Referee: Mike Riley

2 May 2004 36	Liverpool	2–0	Middlesbrough	Liverpool
	Murphy 50' (pen.); Heskey 52'	Report		Stadium: Anfield; Attendance: 42,031; Referee: Andy D'Urso

8 May 2004 37	Birmingham City	0–3	Liverpool	Birmingham
	Cunningham (red card)	Report	Owen 29'; Heskey 51'; Gerrard 86'	Stadium: St Andrew's; Attendance: 29,553; Referee: Steve Dunn

15 May 2004 38	Liverpool	1–1	Newcastle United	Liverpool
	Owen 67'	Report	Ameobi 25'	Stadium: Anfield; Attendance: 44,172; Referee: Mike Riley

=== FA Cup ===
==== Matches ====
4 January 2004 Third Round	Yeovil Town	0–2	Liverpool	Yeovil
		0–2	Heskey 70'; Murphy 77' (pen.)	Stadium: Huish Park; Attendance: 9,348

24 January 2004 Fourth Round	Liverpool	2–1	Newcastle United	Liverpool
	Cheyrou 2', 61'	2-1	Robert 4'	Stadium: Anfield; Attendance: 41,365

15 February 2004 Fifth Round	Liverpool	1–1	Portsmouth	Liverpool
	Owen 2'	1–1	Taylor 77'	Stadium: Anfield; Attendance: 34,669

22 February 2004 Fifth Round Replay	Portsmouth	1–0	Liverpool	Portsmouth
	Hughes 72'	1–0		Stadium: Fratton Park; Attendance: 19,529

=== League Cup ===
==== Matches ====
29 October 2003 Third Round	Blackburn Rovers	3–4	Liverpool	Ewood Park, Blackburn
	Yorke 35'; Ferguson 81'; Yorke 90'	Report	Murphy 39' (pen.); Heskey 49'; Heskey 61'; Kewell 79'	Attendance: 16,918; Referee: Mike Riley

3 December 2003 Fourth Round	Liverpool	2–3	Bolton Wanderers	Anfield, Liverpool
	Murphy 66'; Šmicer 88'	Report	Mário Jardel 4'; Okacha 79'; Djorkaeff 90' (pen.)	Attendance: 33,185; Referee: Mike Riley

=== UEFA Cup ===
==== Matches ====
24 September 2003 First Round; First Leg	Olimpija Ljubljana (Slovenia)	1–1	(England) Liverpool	Bežigrad Stadium, Ljubljana
20:15	Žlogar 66'	Report	Owen 78'	Attendance: 10,000; Referee: Julian Rodriguez Santiago (Spain)

15 October 2003 First Round; Second Leg	Liverpool (England)	3–0	(Slovenia) Olimpija Ljubljana	Anfield, Liverpool
21:00	Le Tallec 30'; Heskey 37'; Kewell 47'	Report		Attendance: 42,880; Referee: Stefan Messner (Austria)

6 November 2003 Second Round; First Leg	Steaua București (Romania)	1–1	(England) Liverpool	Stadionul Steaua, Bucharest
20:00	Răducanu 68'	Report	Traoré 22'	Attendance: 20,000; Referee: Stefano Farina (Italy)

27 November 2003 Second Round; Second Leg	Liverpool (England)	1–0	(Romania) Steaua București	Anfield, Liverpool
21:00	Kewell 50'	Report		Attendance: 42,837; Referee: Florian Meyer (Germany)

26 February 2004 Third Round; First Leg	Liverpool (England)	2–0	(Bulgaria) Levski Sofia	Anfield, Liverpool
21:00	Gerrard 67'; Kewell 70'	Report		Attendance: 39,149; Referee: René Temmink (Netherlands)

3 March 2004 Third Round; Second Leg	Levski Sofia (Bulgaria)	2–4	(England) Liverpool	Vasil Levski National Stadium, Sofia
20:10	G. Ivanov 27'; Simonović 40'	Report	Gerrard 7'; Owen 11'; Hamann 43'; Hyypiä 68'	Attendance: 40,281; Referee: Peter Fröjdfeldt (Sweden)

11 March 2004 Fourth Round; First Leg	Liverpool (England)	1–1	(France) Marseille	Anfield, Liverpool
	Baroš 55'	Report	Drogba 78'	Attendance: 41,270; Referee: Yuri Baskakov (Russia)

25 March 2004 Fourth Round; Second Leg	Marseille (France)	2–1	(England) Liverpool	Stade Vélodrome, Marseille
	Drogba 38' (pen.); Méïté 58'	Report	Heskey 15'	Attendance: 58,000; Referee: Arturo Daudén Ibáñez (Spain)

== Statistics ==
=== Appearances and goals ===
No.	Pos	Nat	Player	Total		Premier League		FA Cup		League Cup		UEFA Cup	
No.	Pos	Nat	Player	Apps	Goals	Apps	Goals	Apps	Goals	Apps	Goals	Apps	Goals
Goalkeepers
1	GK	(Poland) POL	Jerzy Dudek	38	0	30	0	3	0	1	0	4	0
22	GK	(England) ENG	Chris Kirkland	12	0	6	0	1	0	1	0	4	0
29	GK	(France) FRA	Patrice Luzi	1	0	0+1	0	0	0	0	0	0	0
Defenders
2	DF	(Switzerland) SUI	Stéphane Henchoz	27	0	15+3	0	4	0	1	0	3+1	0
3	DF	(Republic of Ireland) IRL	Steve Finnan	31	0	19+3	0	3	0	0	0	5+1	0
4	DF	(Finland) FIN	Sami Hyypiä	51	5	38	4	4	0	1	0	8	1
18	DF	(Norway) NOR	John Arne Riise	35	0	22+6	0	1	0	1+1	0	4	0
21	DF	(France) FRA	Djimi Traoré	11	1	7	0	0	0	2	0	2	1
23	DF	(England) ENG	Jamie Carragher	29	0	22	0	3	0	0	0	4	0
25	DF	(Croatia) CRO	Igor Bišćan	39	0	27+2	0	1	0	2	0	5+2	0
36	DF	(England) ENG	Jon Otsemobor	5	0	4	0	0	0	1	0	0	0
Midfielders
7	MF	(Australia) AUS	Harry Kewell	49	11	36	7	3	0	0+2	1	8	3
9	MF	(Senegal) SEN	El Hadji Diouf	33	0	20+6	0	1	0	2	0	3+1	0
11	MF	(Czech Republic) CZE	Vladimír Šmicer	25	4	15+5	3	1	0	1	1	2+1	0
13	MF	(England) ENG	Danny Murphy	42	6	19+12	3	1+1	1	2	2	6+1	0
15	MF	(Senegal) SEN	Salif Diao	7	0	2+1	0	0	0	1	0	2+1	0
16	MF	(Germany) GER	Dietmar Hamann	35	3	25	2	4	0	0+1	0	5	1
17	MF	(England) ENG	Steven Gerrard	47	6	34	4	3	0	1+1	0	7+1	2
28	MF	(France) FRA	Bruno Cheyrou	19	4	9+3	2	3+1	2	0	0	1+2	0
32	MF	(England) ENG	John Welsh	2	0	0+1	0	0	0	0	0	0+1	0
Forwards
5	FW	(Czech Republic) CZE	Milan Baroš	18	2	6+7	1	0+1	0	0	0	2+2	1
8	FW	(England) ENG	Emile Heskey	47	12	25+10	7	3+1	1	2	2	4+2	2
10	FW	(England) ENG	Michael Owen	38	19	29	16	3	1	0	0	6	2
20	FW	(France) FRA	Anthony Le Tallec	23	1	3+10	0	1+3	0	2	0	2+2	1
24	FW	(France) FRA	Florent Sinama Pongolle	23	2	3+12	2	1+2	0	1+1	0	1+2	0
Players transferred out during the season
12	GK	(Wales) WAL	Paul Jones	2	0	2	0	0	0	0	0	0	0

Last updated: 30 May 2004
Source: Competitions

=== Top scorers ===
Rank	No.	Pos	Nat	Name	Premier League	FA Cup	League Cup	UEFA Cup	Total
1	10	FW	(England)	Michael Owen	16	1	0	2	19
2	8	FW	(England)	Emile Heskey	7	1	2	2	12
3	7	MF	(Australia)	Harry Kewell	7	0	1	3	11
4	7	MF	(England)	Danny Murphy	5	1	2	0	8
5	17	MF	(England)	Steven Gerrard	4	0	0	2	6
6	4	DF	(Finland)	Sami Hyypiä	4	0	0	1	5
7	11	MF	(Czech Republic)	Vladimír Šmicer	3	0	1	0	4
7	28	MF	(France)	Bruno Cheyrou	2	2	0	0	4
9	16	MF	(Germany)	Dietmar Hamann	2	0	0	1	3
10	5	FW	(Czech Republic)	Milan Baroš	1	0	0	1	2
10	24	FW	(France)	Florent Sinama Pongolle	2	0	0	0	2
12	20	FW	(France)	Anthony Le Tallec	0	0	0	1	1
12	25	DF	(France)	Djimi Traoré	0	0	0	1	1
Own goal					2	0	0	0	2
Totals					55	5	6	14	80
