= 2005–06 Liverpool F.C. season =

English football club season

Liverpool
2005−06 season
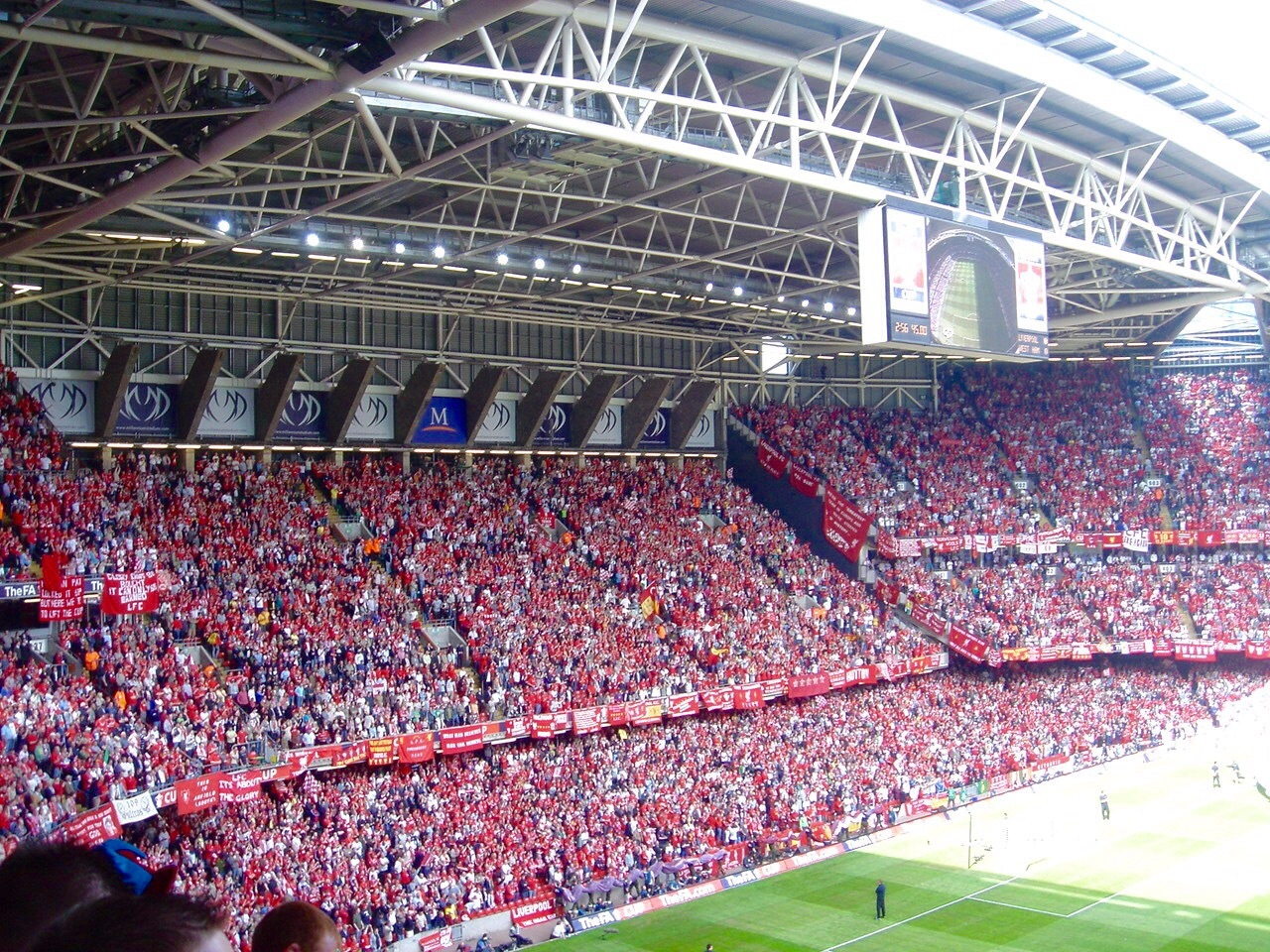
- Liverpool supporters at the 2006 FA Cup Final
- Chairman: David Moores
- Manager: Rafael Benítez
- Premier League: 3rd
- FA Cup: Winners
- League Cup: Third round
- UEFA Champions League: Round of 16
- UEFA Super Cup: Winners
- FIFA Club World Cup: Runners-up
- Top goalscorer: League: Steven Gerrard (10); All: Steven Gerrard (23)
Home colours	Away colours	Third colours

The 2005–06 season was the 114th season in Liverpool Football Club's existence, and their 44th consecutive year in the top-flight, and covers the period from 1 July 2005 to 30 June 2006. Liverpool finished the season in third position, nine points behind champions Chelsea. They won the FA Cup for the seventh time by beating West Ham United in the final 3–1 on penalties after a 3–3 draw.

== Players ==
=== First team squad ===
Note: Flags indicate national team as defined under FIFA eligibility rules; some limited exceptions apply. Players may hold more than one non-FIFA nationality.

No.	Pos.	Nation	Player
1	GK	POL	Jerzy Dudek
2	DF	NED	Jan Kromkamp
3	DF	IRL	Steve Finnan
4	DF	FIN	Sami Hyypiä
5	DF	DEN	Daniel Agger
6	DF	NOR	John Arne Riise
7	MF	AUS	Harry Kewell
8	MF	ENG	Steven Gerrard (captain)
9	FW	FRA	Djibril Cissé
10	MF	ESP	Luis García
11	FW	ENG	Robbie Fowler
14	MF	ESP	Xabi Alonso

No.	Pos.	Nation	Player
15	FW	ENG	Peter Crouch
16	MF	GER	Dietmar Hamann
19	FW	ESP	Fernando Morientes
20	GK	ENG	Scott Carson
21	DF	MLI	Djimi Traoré (Note: Traoré was born in Saint-Ouen, France, but also qualified to represent Mali internationally and made his international debut for Mali in 2004.)
22	MF	MLI	Mohamed Sissoko (Note: Sissoko was born in Mont-Saint-Aignan, France, but also qualified to represent Mali internationally and made his international debut for Mali in 2004.)
23	DF	ENG	Jamie Carragher
24	FW	FRA	Florent Sinama Pongolle
25	GK	ESP	Pepe Reina
28	DF	ENG	Stephen Warnock
30	MF	NED	Boudewijn Zenden
36	DF	ESP	Antonio Barragán

=== Left club during season ===
Note: Flags indicate national team as defined under FIFA eligibility rules; some limited exceptions apply. Players may hold more than one non-FIFA nationality.

No.	Pos.	Nation	Player
5	FW	CZE	Milan Baroš (to Aston Villa)
17	DF	ESP	Josemi (to Villarreal)
31	DF	ENG	David Raven (on loan to Tranmere Rovers)
32	DF	ENG	John Welsh (to Hull City)
33	FW	ENG	Neil Mellor (on loan to Wigan Athletic)

No.	Pos.	Nation	Player
34	MF	IRL	Darren Potter (Note: Potter was born in Liverpool, England, but also qualified to represent the Republic of Ireland internationally and represented them at youth level before making his international debut for the Republic of Ireland in May 2007.) (on loan to Southampton)
35	DF	FRA	Carl Medjani (Note: Medjani was born in Lyon, France, and represented them at youth level, but also qualified to represent Algeria internationally through his father and would make his international debut for Algeria in 2010.) (on loan to Metz)
37	DF	USA	Zak Whitbread (on loan to Millwall)
—	MF	SEN	Salif Diao (on loan to Portsmouth)
—	MF	CHI	Mark González (Note: González was born in Durban, South Africa, but was raised in Chile from the age of 10 and made his international debut for Chile in 2003.) (on loan to Real Sociedad)

== Reserve squad ==
Note: Flags indicate national team as defined under FIFA eligibility rules; some limited exceptions apply. Players may hold more than one non-FIFA nationality.

No.	Pos.	Nation	Player
26	MF	ENG	Paul Anderson
32	MF	AUT	Besian Idrizaj
35	MF	ENG	Danny Guthrie
38	MF	ENG	David Mannix

No.	Pos.	Nation	Player
39	MF	SCO	Ryan Wilkie
40	GK	ENG	David Martin
42	FW	SCO	Robbie Foy

== Statistics ==
=== Appearances and goals ===
No.	Pos	Nat	Player	Total		Premier League		FA Cup		League Cup		Continental	
No.	Pos	Nat	Player	Apps	Goals	Apps	Goals	Apps	Goals	Apps	Goals	Apps	Goals
Goalkeepers
1	GK	(Poland) POL	Jerzy Dudek	6	0	5+1	0	0	0	0	0	0	0
25	GK	(Spain) ESP	Pepe Reina	53	0	33	0	5	0	0	0	15	0
20	GK	(England) ENG	Scott Carson	4	0	0	0	1	0	1	0	2	0
Defenders
2	DF	(Netherlands) NED	Jan Kromkamp	17	0	6+7	0	1+3	0	0	0	0	0
3	DF	(Republic of Ireland) IRL	Steve Finnan	52	0	33	0	5+1	0	0	0	13	0
4	DF	(Finland) FIN	Sami Hyypiä	59	2	35+1	1	6	1	1	0	16	0
5	DF	(Denmark) DEN	Daniel Agger	5	0	4	0	1	0	0	0	0	0
6	DF	(Norway) NOR	John Arne Riise	52	4	24+8	1	6	3	0	0	12+2	0
21	DF	(Mali) MLI	Djimi Traoré	24	0	9+6	0	1+1	0	0+1	0	6	0
23	DF	(England) ENG	Jamie Carragher	57	1	36	0	6	0	0	0	15	1
28	DF	(England) ENG	Stephen Warnock	30	1	15+5	1	1+1	0	1	0	6+1	0
36	DF	(Spain) ESP	Antonio Barragán	1	0	0	0	0	0	0	0	0+1	0
Midfielders
7	MF	(Australia) AUS	Harry Kewell	41	3	22+5	3	4+2	0	1	0	3+4	0
8	MF	(England) ENG	Steven Gerrard	53	23	32	10	6	4	1	1	10+4	8
10	MF	(Spain) ESP	Luis Garcia	50	11	15+16	7	2+1	1	0+1	0	11+4	3
14	MF	(Spain) ESP	Xabi Alonso	53	5	29+6	3	5	2	0	0	13	0
16	MF	(Germany) GER	Dietmar Hamann	32	0	13+4	0	1+1	0	1	0	8+4	0
22	MF	(Mali) MLI	Mohamed Sissoko	45	0	21+5	0	6	0	0	0	10+3	0
30	MF	(Netherlands) NED	Bolo Zenden	19	2	5+2	2	0	0	1+1	0	6+4	0
Forwards
9	FW	(France) FRA	Djibril Cissé	54	19	19+14	9	3+3	2	0	0	7+8	8
11	FW	(England) ENG	Robbie Fowler	16	5	9+5	5	0	0	0	0	1+1	0
15	FW	(England) ENG	Peter Crouch	49	13	27+5	8	5+1	3	1	0	9+1	2
19	FW	(Spain) ESP	Fernando Morientes	46	9	20+8	5	2+3	1	1	0	10+2	3
24	FW	(France) FRA	Florent Sinama Pongolle	16	3	3+4	0	0+1	2	0+1	0	1+6	1
Players transferred out during the season
5	FW	(Czech Republic) CZE	Milan Baroš	2	0	0+2	0	0	0	0	0	0	0
13	MF	(France) FRA	Anthony Le Tallec	2	0	0	0	0	0	0	0	2	0
17	DF	(Spain) ESP	Josemi	12	0	3+3	0	0	0	0	0	6	0
31	DF	(England) ENG	David Raven	1	0	0	0	0	0	1	0	0	0
34	MF	(Republic of Ireland) IRL	Darren Potter	7	0	0	0	0	0	1	0	4+2	0
37	DF	(United States) USA	Zak Whitbread	3	0	0	0	0	0	1	0	1+1	0

Last updated: 15 May 2006
Source: Competitions

=== Goalscorers ===
Rank	No.	Pos	Player	Premier League	FA Cup	League Cup	Champions League	Club World Cup	UEFA Super Cup	Total
1	8	MF	(England) Steven Gerrard	10	4	1	7	1	0	23
2	9	FW	(France) Djibril Cissé	9	2	0	6	0	2	19
3	15	FW	(England) Peter Crouch	8	3	0	0	2	0	13
4	10	MF	(Spain) Luis García	7	1	0	2	0	1	11
5	19	FW	(Spain) Fernando Morientes	5	1	0	3	0	0	9
6	11	FW	(England) Robbie Fowler	5	0	0	0	0	0	5
6	14	MF	(Spain) Xabi Alonso	3	2	0	0	0	0	5
8	6	DF	(Norway) John Arne Riise	1	3	0	0	0	0	4
9	7	MF	(Australia) Harry Kewell	3	0	0	0	0	0	3
9	24	FW	(France) Florent Sinama Pongolle	0	2	0	1	0	0	3
11	4	DF	(Finland) Sami Hyypiä	1	1	0	0	0	0	2
11	30	MF	(Netherlands) Boudewijn Zenden	2	0	0	0	0	0	2
13	23	DF	(England) Jamie Carragher	0	0	0	1	0	0	1
13	28	DF	(England) Stephen Warnock	1	0	0	0	0	0	1
Own Goal				2	1	0	0	0	0	3
TOTALS				57	19	1	20	3	3	104

== Transfers ==
=== In ===
#	Pos	Player	From	Fee	Date
36	DF	(Spain) Antonio Barragán	(Spain) Seville	Free	4 July 2005
30	MF	(Netherlands) Boudewijn Zenden	(England) Middlesbrough	Free	4 July 2005
25	GK	(Spain) Pepe Reina	(Spain) Villarreal	£6,860,000	4 July 2005
22	MF	(Mali) Mohamed Sissoko	(Spain) Valencia	£5,600,000	13 July 2005
15	FW	(England) Peter Crouch	(England) Southampton	£7,000,000	20 July 2005
34	DF	(Spain) Miki Roqué	(Spain) Lleida	Unknown	16 August 2005
46	DF	(England) Jack Hobbs	(England) Lincoln City	£150,000	18 August 2005
32	ST	(Austria) Besian Idrizaj	(Austria) Linz	£190,000	30 August 2005
–	MF	(Chile) Mark González	(Spain) Albacete	£1,500,000	20 October 2005
26	MF	(England) Paul Anderson	(England) Hull City	Swap	4 January 2006
2	MF	(Netherlands) Jan Kromkamp	(Spain) Villarreal	Swap	4 January 2006
40	GK	(England) David Martin	(England) Milton Keynes	£250,000	12 January 2006
5	DF	(Denmark) Daniel Agger	(Denmark) Brøndby	£5,800,000	12 January 2006
11	FW	(England) Robbie Fowler	(England) Manchester City	Free	27 January 2006

=== Out ===
#	Pos	Player	To	Fee	Date
11	MF	(Czech Republic) Vladimír Šmicer	(France) Bordeaux	Free	13 June 2005
9	FW	(Senegal) El Hadji Diouf	(England) Bolton Wanderers	£3,500,000	16 June 2005
12	DF	(Argentina) Mauricio Pellegrino	(Spain) Alavés	Free	17 June 2005
31	DM	(France) Alou Diarra	(France) Lens	£2,000,000	23 June 2005
25	DM	(Croatia) Igor Bišćan	(Greece) Panathinaikos	Free	15 July 2005
36	DF	(England) Jon Otsemobor	(England) Rotherham United	Free	4 July 2005
26	MF	(Republic of Ireland) Richie Partridge	Unattached	Free	1 July 2005
29	GK	(France) Patrice Luzi	Unattached	Free	1 July 2005
27	DF	(France) Gregory Vignal	(England) Portsmouth	Free	12 July 2005
18	MF	(Spain) Antonio Núñez	(Spain) Celta Vigo	£2,000,000	17 July 2005
5	FW	(Czech Republic) Milan Baroš	(England) Aston Villa	£6,500,000	23 August 2005
32	MF	(England) John Welsh	(England) Hull City	Swap	4 January 2006
17	DF	(Spain) Josemi	(Spain) Villarreal	Swap	4 January 2006

== All games ==
=== Pre-season ===
Friendlies

Kick Off	Opponents	H / A	Result	Scorers	Referee	Attendance
9 July 2005 15:00	(Wales) Wrexham	A	4 – 3	Morientes 16', 41', Baroš 51', 71'	(England) Mike Jones	(Report)
16 July 2005 18:30	(Germany) Bayer Leverkusen	N	3 – 0	Cissé 25', 26', Baroš 56'		(Report)
23 July 2005 19:00	(Greece) Olympiacos	N	4 – 3	García 31', Morientes 49', Baroš 53', 59'	(Switzerland) Reno Rutz	(Report)

== Premier League ==
=== Matches ===
13 August 2005 1	Middlesbrough	0–0	Liverpool	Middlesbrough
17:15 BST	Ehiogu (red card) 74'	Report		Stadium: Riverside Stadium; Attendance: 31,908; Referee: Mark Halsey

20 August 2005 2	Liverpool	1–0	Sunderland	Liverpool
15:00 BST	Alonso 24'	Report	Welsh (red card) 74'	Stadium: Anfield; Attendance: 44,913; Referee: Barry Knight

10 September 2005 3	Tottenham Hotspur	0–0	Liverpool	London
15:00 BST		Report		Stadium: White Hart Lane; Attendance: 36,148; Referee: Howard Webb

18 September 2005 4	Liverpool	0–0	Manchester United	Liverpool
12:00 BST		Report		Stadium: Anfield; Attendance: 44,917; Referee: Rob Styles

24 September 2005 5	Birmingham City	2–2	Liverpool	Birmingham
12:45 BST	Warnock 72' (o.g.); Pandiani 75'; Kilkenny (red card) 84'	Report	García 68'; Cissé 85' (pen.)	Stadium: St Andrew's; Attendance: 27,733; Referee: Steve Bennett

2 October 2005 6	Liverpool	1–4	Chelsea	Liverpool
16:00 BST	Gerrard 36'	Report	Lampard 27' (pen.); Duff 43'; J. Cole 63'; Geremi 82'	Stadium: Anfield; Attendance: 44,235; Referee: Graham Poll

15 October 2005 7	Liverpool	1–0	Blackburn Rovers	Liverpool
15:00 BST	Cissé 78'	Report	Khizanishvili (red card) 33'	Stadium: Anfield; Attendance: 44,697; Referee: Mark Halsey

22 October 2005 8	Fulham	2–0	Liverpool	London
15:00 BST	John 30'; Boa Morte 90'	Report		Stadium: Craven Cottage; Attendance: 22,480; Referee: Martin Atkinson

29 October 2005 9	Liverpool	2–0	West Ham United	Liverpool
15:00 BST	Alonso 18'; Zenden 82'	Report		Stadium: Anfield; Attendance: 44,537; Referee: Uriah Rennie

5 November 2005 10	Aston Villa	0–2	Liverpool	Birmingham
12:45 GMT		Report	Gerrard 85' (pen.); Alonso 89'	Stadium: Villa Park; Attendance: 42,551; Referee: Steve Bennett

19 November 2005 11	Liverpool	3–0	Portsmouth	Liverpool
15:00 GMT	Zenden 23'; Cissé 39'; Morientes 73'	Report		Stadium: Anfield; Attendance: 44,394; Referee: Peter Walton

26 November 2005 12	Manchester City	0–1	Liverpool	Manchester
15:00 GMT		Report	Riise 61'	Stadium: City of Manchester Stadium; Attendance: 47,105; Referee: Alan Wiley

30 November 2005 13	Sunderland	0–2	Liverpool	Sunderland
19:45 GMT		Report	García 30'; Gerrard 45'; Sissoko (red card) 65'	Stadium: Stadium of Light; Attendance: 32,697; Referee: Phil Dowd

3 December 2005 14	Liverpool	3–0	Wigan Athletic	Liverpool
12:45 GMT	Crouch 19', 42'; García 70'	Report		Stadium: Anfield; Attendance: 44,098; Referee: Uriah Rennie

10 December 2005 15	Liverpool	2–0	Middlesbrough	Liverpool
12:45 GMT	Morientes 72', 77'	Report	Riggott (red card) 84'	Stadium: Anfield; Attendance: 43,510; Referee: Steve Bennett

26 December 2005 16	Liverpool	2–0	Newcastle United	Liverpool
15:00 GMT	Gerrard 14'; Crouch 43'	Report	Bowyer (red card) 66'	Stadium: Anfield; Attendance: 44,197; Referee: Mark Halsey

28 December 2005 17	Everton	1–3	Liverpool	Liverpool
20:00 GMT	Beattie 42'	Report	Crouch 11'; Gerrard 18'; Cissé 47'	Stadium: Goodison Park; Attendance: 40,158; Referee: Graham Poll

31 December 2005 18	Liverpool	1–0	West Bromwich Albion	Liverpool
15:00 GMT	Crouch 52'	Report		Stadium: Anfield; Attendance: 44,192; Referee: Alan Wiley

2 January 2006 19	Bolton Wanderers	2–2	Liverpool	Bolton
15:00 GMT	Jaïdi 10'; Diouf 71'	Report	Gerrard 67' (pen.); García 82'	Stadium: Reebok Stadium; Attendance: 27,604; Referee: Mark Clattenburg

14 January 2006 20	Liverpool	1–0	Tottenham Hotspur	Liverpool
15:00 GMT	Kewell 59'	Report	Stalteri (red card) 87'	Stadium: Anfield; Attendance: 44,983; Referee: Dermot Gallagher

22 January 2006 21	Manchester United	1–0	Liverpool	Trafford
16:00 GMT	Ferdinand 90'	Report		Stadium: Old Trafford; Attendance: 67,874; Referee: Mike Riley

1 February 2006 22	Liverpool	1–1	Birmingham City	Liverpool
20:00 GMT	Gerrard 62'	Report	Johnson (red card) 28'; Alonso 88' (o.g.)	Stadium: Anfield; Attendance: 43,851; Referee: Uriah Rennie

5 February 2006 23	Chelsea	2–0	Liverpool	London
16:00 GMT	Gallas 35'; Crespo 68'	Report	Reina (red card) 82'	Stadium: Stamford Bridge; Attendance: 42,316; Referee: Alan Wiley

8 February 2006 24	Charlton Athletic	2–0	Liverpool	London
20:00 GMT	D. Bent 42'; L. Young 45'	Report		Stadium: The Valley; Attendance: 27,111; Referee: Andre Marriner

11 February 2006 25	Wigan Athletic	0–1	Liverpool	Wigan
12:45 GMT		Report	Hyypiä 30'	Stadium: JJB Stadium; Attendance: 25,023; Referee: Rob Styles

14 February 2006 26	Liverpool	1–0	Arsenal	Liverpool
20:00 GMT	García 87'	Report		Stadium: Anfield; Attendance: 44,065; Referee: Graham Poll

26 February 2006 27	Liverpool	1–0	Manchester City	Liverpool
12:15 GMT	Kewell 40'	Report	Barton (red card) 52'	Stadium: Anfield; Attendance: 44,121; Referee: Dermot Gallagher

4 March 2006 28	Liverpool	0–0	Charlton Athletic	Liverpool
17:15 GMT		Report		Stadium: Anfield; Attendance: 43,892; Referee: Martin Atkinson

12 March 2006 29	Arsenal	2–1	Liverpool	London
16:00 GMT	Henry 21', 83'	Report	García 76'; Alonso (red card) 81'	Stadium: Highbury; Attendance: 38,221; Referee: Steve Bennett

15 March 2006 30	Liverpool	5–1	Fulham	Liverpool
20:00 GMT	Fowler 15'; Brown 34' (o.g.); Morientes 71'; Crouch 89'; Warnock 90'	Report	John 25'	Stadium: Anfield; Attendance: 42,293; Referee: Alan Wiley

19 March 2006 31	Newcastle United	1–3	Liverpool	Newcastle upon Tyne
13:30 GMT	Ameobi 41'; Boumsong (red card) 51'	Report	Crouch 10'; Gerrard 35'; Cissé 52' (pen.)	Stadium: St. James' Park; Attendance: 52,302; Referee: Mike Riley

25 March 2006 32	Liverpool	3–1	Everton	Liverpool
12:45 GMT	Gerrard (red card) 18'; P. Neville 45' (o.g.); García 47'; Kewell 84'	Report	Cahill 61'	Stadium: Anfield; Attendance: 44,923; Referee: Phil Dowd

1 April 2006 33	West Bromwich Albion	0–2	Liverpool	West Bromwich
17:15 BST		Report	Fowler 7'; Cissé 38'	Stadium: The Hawthorns; Attendance: 27,576; Referee: Uriah Rennie

9 April 2006 34	Liverpool	1–0	Bolton Wanderers	Liverpool
14:00 BST	Fowler 45'	Report		Stadium: Anfield; Attendance: 44,194; Referee: Rob Styles

16 April 2006 35	Blackburn Rovers	0–1	Liverpool	Blackburn
14:30 BST		Report	Fowler 29'	Stadium: Ewood Park; Attendance: 29,142; Referee: Alan Wiley

26 April 2006 36	West Ham United	1–2	Liverpool	London
19:45 BST	Reo-Coker 46'; Mullins (red card) 82'	Report	Cissé 19', 54'; García (red card) 82'	Stadium: Boleyn Ground; Attendance: 34,852; Referee: Howard Webb

29 April 2006 37	Liverpool	3–1	Aston Villa	Liverpool
15:00 BST	Morientes 4'; Gerrard 61', 66'	Report	Barry 58'	Stadium: Anfield; Attendance: 44,479; Referee: Mark Halsey

7 May 2006 38	Portsmouth	1–3	Liverpool	Portsmouth
15:00 BST	Koroman 85'	Report	Fowler 52'; Crouch 84'; Cissé 89'	Stadium: Fratton Park; Attendance: 20,240; Referee: Graham Poll

=== League table ===
Pos	Team	Pld	W	D	L	GF	GA	GD	Pts	Qualification or relegation
1	Chelsea (C)	38	29	4	5	72	22	+50	91	Qualification for the Champions League group stage
2	Manchester United	38	25	8	5	72	34	+38	83	Qualification for the Champions League group stage
3	Liverpool	38	25	7	6	57	25	+32	82	Qualification for the Champions League third qualifying round
4	Arsenal	38	20	7	11	68	31	+37	67	Qualification for the Champions League third qualifying round
5	Tottenham Hotspur	38	18	11	9	53	38	+15	65	Qualification for the UEFA Cup first round (Note: Since Manchester United qualified for the Champions League, their place in the UEFA Cup as League Cup winners passed down to the league and was awarded to Blackburn Rovers as the highest-placed team not already qualified for European competitions.)

Source: Barclays Premier League
Rules for classification: 1) points; 2) goal difference; 3) number of goals scored.
(C) Champions

=== Results summary ===
Overall								Home						Away					
Pld	W	D	L	GF	GA	GD	Pts	W	D	L	GF	GA	GD	W	D	L	GF	GA	GD
38	25	7	6	57	25	+32	82	15	3	1	31	8	+23	10	4	5	26	17	+9

==== Results by round ====
Round	1	2	3	4	5	6	7	8	9	10	11	12	13	14	15	16	17	18	19	20	21	22	23	24	25	26	27	28	29	30	31	32	33	34	35	36	37	38
Ground	A	H	A	H	A	H	H	A	H	A	H	A	A	H	H	H	A	H	A	H	A	H	A	A	A	H	H	H	A	H	A	H	A	H	A	A	H	A
Result	D	W	D	D	D	L	W	L	W	W	W	W	W	W	W	W	W	W	D	W	L	D	L	L	W	W	W	D	L	W	W	W	W	W	W	W	W	W
Position	11	8	11	8	8	9	9	12	10	11	10	10	7	4	3	3	3	3	3	3	3	2	3	3	3	3	3	3	3	3	3	3	3	3	3	3	3	3

Source: Competitive Matches
A = Away; H = Home; W = Win; D = Draw; L = Loss

== UEFA Champions League ==
Home kit used in the UEFA Champions League and FIFA Club World Cup.

=== Qualifying rounds ===
First qualifying round

13 July 2005 First round (First leg)	Liverpool (England)	3–0	(Wales) TNS	Liverpool, England
19:45 BST	Gerrard 8', 21', 89'	Report		Stadium: Anfield; Attendance: 44,760; Referee: Joeri van de Velde (Belgium)

19 July 2005 First round (Second leg)	TNS (Wales)	0–3 (0–6 agg.)	(England) Liverpool	Wrexham, Wales
20:00 BST		Report	Cissé 26'; Gerrard 85', 86'	Stadium: Racecourse Ground; Attendance: 8,009; Referee: Carlo Bertolini (Switzerland)

Second qualifying round

26 July 2005 Second round (First leg)	FBK Kaunas (Lithuania)	1–3	(England) Liverpool	Kaunas, Lithuania
21:45 BST	Barevičius 21'	Report	Cissé 27'; Carragher 30'; Gerrard 54' (pen.)	Stadium: Darius and Girėnas Stadium; Attendance: 8,300; Referee: Knud Erik Fisker (Denmark)

2 August 2005 Second round (Second leg)	Liverpool (England)	2–0 (5–1 agg.)	(Lithuania) FBK Kaunas	Liverpool, England
20:45	Gerrard 77'; Cissé 86'	Report		Stadium: Anfield; Attendance: 43,717; Referee: Gianluca Paparesta (Italy)

Third qualifying round

10 August 2005 Third round (First leg)	CSKA Sofia (Bulgaria)	1–3	(England) Liverpool	Sofia, Bulgaria
20:45	Dimitrov 44'	Report	Cissé 24'; Morientes 30', 58'	Stadium: Vasil Levski National Stadium; Attendance: 16,512; Referee: Jan Wegereef (Netherlands)

23 August 2005 Third round (Second leg)	Liverpool (England)	0–1 (3–2 agg.)	(Bulgaria) CSKA Sofia	Liverpool, England
21:05		Report	Iliev 16'	Stadium: Anfield; Attendance: 42,175; Referee: Wolfgang Stark (Germany)

=== Group stage ===
Pos	Team	Pld	W	D	L	GF	GA	GD	Pts	Qualification
1	(England) Liverpool	6	3	3	0	6	1	+5	12	Advance to knockout stage
2	(England) Chelsea	6	3	2	1	7	1	+6	11	Advance to knockout stage
3	(Spain) Real Betis	6	2	1	3	3	7	−4	7	Transfer to UEFA Cup
4	(Belgium) Anderlecht	6	1	0	5	1	8	−7	3	

Source: RSSSF

13 September 2005 Group stage	Real Betis (Spain)	1–2	(England) Liverpool	Seville, Spain
20:45 CEST	Arzu 51'	Report	Sinama Pongolle 2'; García 14'	Stadium: Estadio Manuel Ruiz de Lopera; Attendance: 45,000; Referee: Konrad Plautz (Austria)

28 September 2005 Group stage	Liverpool (England)	0–0	(England) Chelsea	Liverpool, England
20:45 BST		Report		Stadium: Anfield; Attendance: 42,750; Referee: Massimo De Santis (Italy)

19 October 2005 Group stage	Anderlecht (Belgium)	0–1	(England) Liverpool	Brussels, Belgium
20:45 CEST		Report	Cissé 20'	Stadium: Constant Vanden Stock Stadium; Attendance: 25,000; Referee: Massimo Busacca (Switzerland)

1 November 2005 Group stage	Liverpool (England)	3–0	(Belgium) Anderlecht	Liverpool, England
20:45 GMT	Morientes 34'; García 61'; Cissé 89'	Report		Stadium: Anfield; Attendance: 42,600; Referee: Kim Milton Nielsen (Denmark)

23 November 2005 Group stage	Liverpool (England)	0–0	(Spain) Real Betis	Liverpool, England
19:45 GMT		Report		Stadium: Anfield; Attendance: 42,100; Referee: Eric Poulat (France)

6 December 2005 Group stage	Chelsea (England)	0–0	(England) Liverpool	London, England
19:45 GMT		Report		Stadium: Stamford Bridge; Attendance: 41,600; Referee: Herbert Fandel (Germany)

=== Round of 16 ===
21 February 2006 Round of 16 (First leg)	Benfica (Portugal)	1–0	(England) Liverpool	Lisbon, Portugal
	Luisão 84'	Report		Stadium: Estádio da Luz; Attendance: 65,000; Referee: Konrad Plautz (Austria)

8 March 2006 Round of 16 (Second leg)	Liverpool (England)	0–2 (0–3 agg.)	(Portugal) Benfica	Liverpool, England
		Report	Simão 36'; Miccoli 89'	Stadium: Anfield; Attendance: 42,750; Referee: Massimo De Santis (Italy)

== FA Cup ==
7 January 2006 Third round	Luton Town (2)	3–5	Liverpool (1)	Luton
	Howard 31'; Robinson 43'; Nicholls 53' (pen.)	Report	Gerrard 16'; Sinama Pongolle 62', 74'; Alonso 69', 90+3'	Stadium: Kenilworth Road; Attendance: 10,170

29 January 2006 Fourth round	Portsmouth (1)	1–2	Liverpool (1)	Portsmouth
	Davis 54'	Report	Gerrard 37' (pen.); Riise 41'	Stadium: Fratton Park; Attendance: 17,247

18 February 2006 Fifth round	Liverpool (1)	1–0	Manchester United (1)	Liverpool
	Crouch 19'	Report		Stadium: Anfield; Attendance: 44,039

21 March 2006 Quarter-finals	Birmingham City (1)	0–7	Liverpool (1)	Birmingham
		Report	Hyypiä 1'; Crouch 5', 38'; Morientes 59'; Riise 70'; Tébily 78' (o.g.); Cissé 89'	Stadium: St Andrew's; Attendance: 27,378; Referee: Rob Styles (Hampshire)

22 April 2006 Semi-finals	Liverpool (1)	2–1	Chelsea (1)	Manchester
	Riise 20'; García 53'	Report	Drogba 70'	Stadium: Old Trafford; Attendance: 64,575; Referee: Graham Poll (Hertfortshire)

13 May 2006 Final	Liverpool (1)	3–3 (a.e.t.) (3–1 p)	West Ham United (1)	(Wales) Cardiff
15:00 BST	Cissé 32'; Carragher (yellow card) 52'; Gerrard 54', 90+1'; Hamann (yellow card) 118'	Report	Carragher 21' (o.g.); Ashton 28' (yellow card) 59'; Konchesky 63'	Stadium: Millennium Stadium; Attendance: 71,140; Referee: Alan Wiley (Staffordshire)
	Penalties
	Hamman (penalty scored); Hyypiä (penalty missed); Gerrard (penalty scored); Riise (penalty scored)		(penalty missed) Zamora; (penalty scored) Sheringham; (penalty missed) Konchesky; (penalty missed) Ferdinand

== League Cup ==
25 October 2005 Third round	Crystal Palace	2–1	Liverpool	London
	Freedman 37'; Reich 66'	Report	Gerrard 40'	Stadium: Selhurst Park; Attendance: 19,673; Referee: Phil Dowd (Staffordshire)

== UEFA Super Cup ==
26 August 2005	Liverpool (England)	3–1 (a.e.t.)	(Russia) CSKA Moscow	Monaco
20:45 CEST	Cissé 82', 103'; García 109'	Report	Carvalho 28'	Stadium: Stade Louis II; Attendance: 17,042; Referee: René Temmink (Netherlands)

== FIFA Club World Cup ==
=== Semi-finals ===
15 December 2005 Semi-finals	Liverpool (England)	3–0	(Costa Rica) Saprissa	Yokohama
19:20	Crouch 3', 58'; Gerrard 32'	Report		Stadium: International Stadium Yokohama; Attendance: 43,902; Referee: Carlos Chandia (Chile)

=== Final ===
18 December 2005 Final	São Paulo (Brazil)	1–0	(England) Liverpool	Yokohama
19:20	Mineiro 27'	Report		Stadium: International Stadium Yokohama; Attendance: 66,821; Referee: Benito Archundia (Mexico)

== See also ==
- 2005–06 in English football
- 2006 FA Cup Final
