= 2002–03 Liverpool F.C. season =

English football club season

Liverpool
2002–03 season
- Chairman: David Moores
- Manager: Gérard Houllier
- Premier League: 5th
- FA Cup: Fourth round
- League Cup: Winners
- UEFA Champions League: Group stage
- UEFA Cup: Quarter-finals
- FA Community Shield: Runners-up
- Top goalscorer: League: Michael Owen (19); All: Michael Owen (28)
- Average home league attendance: 42,768
Home colours	Away colours	Third colours

The 2002–2003 season was Liverpool Football Club's 111th season in existence and their 41st consecutive season in the top-flight of English football.

== Season summary ==
Having finished second the previous season, Liverpool had high hopes to win their first league title since 1990. Indeed, they topped the Premier League table after their first 12 games (including a seven-game winning streak), picking up 30 points out of a possible 36, a run which saw them four points clear at the top from reigning champions Arsenal. However, on 9 November 2002, they suffered a surprise 1–0 away defeat at the hands of high-fliers Middlesbrough. This wasn't completely disastrous; it did see their lead cut to one point but three days later, they completed a miserable week after they bowed out of the Champions League after failure to beat Basel. That week's two results started a freefall of 13 matches without victory (including 11 league games) and a dismal run of only two wins in 16 league matches (both away at Southampton and West Ham United) which ended such title hopes. They were, in fact, out of the top four altogether, never to return after a shock 2–1 defeat at struggling Sunderland. However, their first home league win in four months came in a 2–0 win over Bolton Wanderers on 8 March 2003, starting a more promising run of seven wins in eight league games which almost took the club to Champions League qualification anyway, but defeats at the hands of Manchester City and Chelsea in the final two games of the season buried those hopes. A League Cup win following a 2–0 victory over arch-rivals Manchester United was the sole glorious moment of a disappointing season.

Competition	Result	Top scorer
Premier League	5th	(England) Michael Owen, 19
Champions League	First group stage	(England) Michael Owen, 4
UEFA Cup	Quarter-finals	(England) Michael Owen, 3
FA Cup	Fourth round	(England) Danny Murphy, 1
League Cup	Winners	(Senegal) El Hadji Diouf, 3
Overall		(England) Michael Owen, 28

== First-team squad ==
Note: Flags indicate national team as defined under FIFA eligibility rules; some limited exceptions apply. Players may hold more than one non-FIFA nationality.

No.	Pos.	Nation	Player
1	GK	POL	Jerzy Dudek
2	DF	SUI	Stéphane Henchoz
3	DF	POR	Abel Xavier (Note: Xavier was born in Nampula, Portuguese Mozambique (now Mozambique), which was then an overseas territory of Portugal, and made his international debut for Portugal in March 1993.)
4	DF	FIN	Sami Hyypiä (captain)
5	FW	CZE	Milan Baroš
6	DF	GER	Markus Babbel
7	MF	CZE	Vladimír Šmicer
8	FW	ENG	Emile Heskey
9	FW	SEN	El Hadji Diouf
10	FW	ENG	Michael Owen
13	MF	ENG	Danny Murphy
14	DF	NOR	Vegard Heggem
15	MF	CZE	Patrik Berger
16	MF	GER	Dietmar Hamann
17	MF	ENG	Steven Gerrard
18	DF	NOR	John Arne Riise
19	GK	GLP	Pegguy Arphexad
21	MF	SEN	Salif Diao

No.	Pos.	Nation	Player
22	GK	ENG	Chris Kirkland
23	DF	ENG	Jamie Carragher
24	MF	FRA	Bernard Diomède
25	MF	CRO	Igor Bišćan
26	MF	IRL	Richie Partridge
27	DF	FRA	Grégory Vignal
28	MF	FRA	Bruno Cheyrou
30	DF	FRA	Djimi Traoré (Note: Traoré was born in Saint-Ouen, France, but also qualified to represent Mali internationally and would make his international debut for Mali in 2004.)
31	DF	FRA	Alou Diarra
32	MF	ENG	John Welsh
33	FW	ENG	Neil Mellor
34	MF	FIN	Daniel Sjölund
35	DF	ENG	Stephen Warnock
36	DF	ENG	Jon Otsemobor
38	MF	IRL	Michael Foley-Sheridan
39	GK	FRA	Patrice Luzi
40	MF	SCO	Robbie Foy

=== Left club during season ===
Note: Flags indicate national team as defined under FIFA eligibility rules; some limited exceptions apply. Players may hold more than one non-FIFA nationality.

No.	Pos.	Nation	Player
20	MF	ENG	Nick Barmby (to Leeds United)
29	DF	ENG	Stephen Wright (to Sunderland)

No.	Pos.	Nation	Player
37	MF	FIN	Jari Litmanen (to Ajax)

== Statistics ==
=== Appearances ===
As of end of season

No.	Pos	Nat	Player	Total		Premier League		FA Cup		League Cup		Champions League UEFA Cup		Community Shield	
No.	Pos	Nat	Player	Apps	Goals	Apps	Goals	Apps	Goals	Apps	Goals	Apps	Goals	Apps	Goals
1	GK	(Poland) POL	Jerzy Dudek	46	0	30	0	1+1	0	2	0	11	0	1	0
2	DF	(Switzerland) SUI	Stéphane Henchoz	32	0	19	0	2	0	4	0	6	0	1	0
3	DF	(Portugal) POR	Abel Xavier	6	0	4	0	0	0	1	0	0	0	1	0
4	DF	(Finland) FIN	Sami Hyypiä	56	5	36	3	3	0	4	0	12	2	1	0
5	FW	(Czech Republic) CZE	Milan Baroš	42	12	17+10	9	0+1	0	2+2	2	3+6	1	0+1	0
6	DF	(Germany) GER	Markus Babbel	7	0	2	0	0	0	3	0	1	0	0+1	0
7	MF	(Czech Republic) CZE	Vladimír Šmicer	34	1	10+11	0	1	0	4+1	0	3+3	1	0+1	0
8	FW	(England) ENG	Emile Heskey	51	10	22+10	6	2	1	2+3	0	10+1	3	1	0
9	FW	(Senegal) SEN	El Hadji Diouf	47	6	21+8	3	3	0	5	3	5+4	0	1	0
10	FW	(England) ENG	Michael Owen	54	28	32+3	19	2	0	3+1	2	11+1	7	1	0
13	MF	(England) ENG	Danny Murphy	55	12	36	7	3	1	4	2	11	2	0+1	0
15	MF	(Czech Republic) CZE	Patrik Berger	4	1	0+2	0	0	0	1	1	0+1	0	0	0
16	MF	(Germany) GER	Dietmar Hamann	42	2	29+1	2	1	0	1	0	7+2	0	1	0
17	MF	(England) ENG	Steven Gerrard	54	7	32+2	5	2	0	6	2	11	0	1	0
18	DF	(Norway) NOR	John Arne Riise	55	7	31+6	6	2	1	4	0	10+1	0	1	0
21	MF	(Senegal) SEN	Salif Diao	40	2	13+13	1	1+1	0	6+3	1	2+1	0	0	0
22	GK	(England) ENG	Chris Kirkland	15	0	8	0	2	0	4	0	1	0	0	0
23	DF	(England) ENG	Jamie Carragher	54	0	34+1	0	3	0	9+2	0	5	0	0	0
25	MF	(Croatia) CRO	Igor Bišćan	13	0	3+3	0	0+1	0	2+2	0	0+2	0	0	0
27	DF	(France) FRA	Gregory Vignal	5	0	0+1	0	1	0	2	0	0+1	0	0	0
28	MF	(France) FRA	Bruno Cheyrou	29	1	8+11	0	2	0	1+1	0	3+2	1	0+1	0
30	DF	(France) FRA	Djimi Traoré	49	0	30+2	0	2	0	2+1	0	10+1	0	1	0
32	MF	(England) ENG	John Welsh	1	0	0	0	0	0	0+1	0	0	0	0	0
33	FW	(England) ENG	Neil Mellor	6	1	1+2	0	1	0	2	1	0	0	0	0
36	DF	(England) ENG	Jon Otsemobor	1	0	0	0	0	0	1	0	0	0	0	0

== Transfers ==
=== In ===
#	Pos	Player	From	Fee	Date
28	MF	(France) Bruno Cheyrou	(France) Lille	£3,700,000	16 May 2002
9	FW	(Senegal) El Hadji Diouf	(France) Lens	£10,000,000	1 June 2002
–	MF	(France) Alou Diarra	(Germany) Bayern Munich	Free	9 July 2002
39	GK	(France) Patrice Luzi	(France) Monaco	Free	29 July 2002
21	MF	(Senegal) Salif Diao	(France) Sedan	£4,700,000	6 August 2002

=== Out ===
#	Pos	Player	To	Fee	Date
21	GK	(Denmark) Jørgen Nielsen	(Denmark) Nordsjælland	Free	1 July 2002
20	MF	(England) Nick Barmby	(England) Leeds United	£3,750,000	8 August 2002
29	DF	(England) Stephen Wright	(England) Sunderland	£1,500,000	15 August 2002
37	MF	(Finland) Jari Litmanen	(Netherlands) Ajax	Free	30 August 2002

- In: ▼£18,400,000
- Out: ▲£5,250,000
- Total spending: ▼£13,150,000

== Competitions ==
=== Premier League ===
==== League table ====
Pos	Team	Pld	W	D	L	GF	GA	GD	Pts	Qualification or relegation
3	Newcastle United	38	21	6	11	63	48	+15	69	Qualification for the Champions League third qualifying round
4	Chelsea	38	19	10	9	68	38	+30	67	Qualification for the Champions League third qualifying round
5	Liverpool	38	18	10	10	61	41	+20	64	Qualification for the UEFA Cup first round (Note: Since Liverpool qualified for the UEFA Cup via the league, their place in the UEFA Cup as League Cup winners reverted to the league and was awarded to Blackburn Rovers as the highest-placed team not already qualified for European competitions.)
6	Blackburn Rovers	38	16	12	10	52	43	+9	60	Qualification for the UEFA Cup first round
7	Everton	38	17	8	13	48	49	−1	59	

Source: Premier League
Rules for classification: 1) points; 2) goal difference; 3) number of goals scored.

==== Results by round ====
Round	1	2	3	4	5	6	7	8	9	10	11	12	13	14	15	16	17	18	19	20	21	22	23	24	25	26	27	28	29	30	31	32	33	34	35	36	37	38
Ground	A	H	A	H	H	A	H	A	H	A	H	H	A	H	A	H	A	A	H	H	A	A	H	A	H	A	H	A	H	A	H	A	H	A	H	A	H	A
Result	W	W	D	D	D	W	W	W	W	W	W	W	L	D	L	L	L	L	D	D	D	L	D	W	D	W	D	L	W	W	W	L	W	W	W	W	L	L
Position	6	2	2	3	4	5	2	2	2	1	1	1	1	2	2	2	4	6	6	6	6	7	7	6	6	6	6	7	6	6	5	6	6	5	5	5	5	5

Source: Competitive Matches
A = Away; H = Home; W = Win; D = Draw; L = Loss

==== Matches ====
18 August 2002 1	Aston Villa	0–1	Liverpool	Birmingham
14:00 BST		Report	Riise 47'	Stadium: Villa Park; Attendance: 41,183; Referee: Andy D'Urso

24 August 2002 2	Liverpool	3–0	Southampton	Liverpool
15:00 BST	Diouf 3', 51'; Murphy 90' (pen.)	Report		Stadium: Anfield; Attendance: 43,058; Referee: Jeff Winter

28 August 2002 3	Blackburn Rovers	2–2	Liverpool	Blackburn
20:00 BST	Dunn 15'; Grabbi 83'	Report	Murphy 31'; Riise 77'	Stadium: Ewood Park; Attendance: 29,207; Referee: Steve Bennett

2 September 2002 4	Liverpool	2–2	Newcastle United	Liverpool
20:00 BST	Hamann 53'; Owen 73' (pen.)	Report	Speed 80'; Shearer 88'	Stadium: Anfield; Attendance: 43,241; Referee: Graham Poll

11 September 2002 5	Liverpool	2–2	Birmingham City	Liverpool
20:00 BST	Murphy 25'; Gerrard 49'	Report	Morrison 61', 90'	Stadium: Anfield; Attendance: 43,113; Referee: Neale Barry

14 September 2002 6	Bolton Wanderers	2–3	Liverpool	Bolton
15:00 BST	Gardner 54'; Campo 87'	Report	Baroš 45', 72'; Heskey 88'	Stadium: Reebok Stadium; Attendance: 27,328; Referee: Rob Styles

21 September 2002 7	Liverpool	2–0	West Bromwich Albion	Liverpool
15:00 BST	Baroš 56'; Riise 90'	Report		Stadium: Anfield; Attendance: 43,830; Referee: David Elleray

28 September 2002 8	Manchester City	0–3	Liverpool	Manchester
15:00 BST		Report	Owen 4', 64', 89'	Stadium: Maine Road; Attendance: 35,131; Referee: Paul Durkin

6 October 2002 9	Liverpool	1–0	Chelsea	Liverpool
16:00 BST	Owen 90'	Report		Stadium: Anfield; Attendance: 43,856; Referee: Graham Barber

19 October 2002 10	Leeds United	0–1	Liverpool	Leeds
12:00 BST		Report	Diao 66'	Stadium: Elland Road; Attendance: 40,187; Referee: Steve Dunn

26 October 2002 11	Liverpool	2–1	Tottenham Hotspur	Liverpool
15:00 BST	Murphy 72'; Owen 86' (pen.)	Report	Richards 82'	Stadium: Anfield; Attendance: 44,084; Referee: Mike Riley

2 November 2002 12	Liverpool	2–0	West Ham United	Liverpool
15:00 GMT	Owen 28', 55'	Report		Stadium: Anfield; Attendance: 44,048; Referee: Eddie Wolstenholme

9 November 2002 13	Middlesbrough	1–0	Liverpool	Middlesbrough
15:00 GMT	Southgate 82'	Report		Stadium: Riverside; Attendance: 34,747; Referee: Mark Halsey

17 November 2002 14	Liverpool	0–0	Sunderland	Liverpool
14:00 GMT		Report		Stadium: Anfield; Attendance: 43,074; Referee: Andy D'Urso

23 November 2002 15	Fulham	3–2	Liverpool	London
15:00 GMT	Sava 5', 68'; Davis 38'	Report	Hamann 62'; Baroš 86'	Stadium: Loftus Road; Attendance: 18,144; Referee: Graham Poll

1 December 2002 16	Liverpool	1–2	Manchester United	Liverpool
12:15 GMT	Hyypiä 82'	Report	Forlán 64', 67'	Stadium: Anfield; Attendance: 44,250; Referee: Alan Wiley

7 December 2002 17	Charlton Athletic	2–0	Liverpool	London
15:00 GMT	Euell 36'; Konchesky 78'	Report		Stadium: The Valley; Attendance: 26,694; Referee: Mike Riley

15 December 2002 18	Sunderland	2–1	Liverpool	Sunderland
16:00 GMT	McCann 36'; Proctor 85'	Report	Baroš 68'	Stadium: Stadium of Light; Attendance: 37,118; Referee: Mark Halsey

22 December 2002 19	Liverpool	0–0	Everton	Liverpool
16:00 GMT		Report		Stadium: Anfield; Attendance: 44,025; Referee: Graham Poll

26 December 2002 20	Liverpool	1–1	Blackburn Rovers	Liverpool
	Riise 17'	Report	Cole 77'	Stadium: Anfield; Attendance: 43,075; Referee: Neale Barry

29 December 2002 21	Arsenal	1–1	Liverpool	London
16:00 GMT	Henry 79' (pen.)	Report	Murphy 70' (pen.)	Stadium: Highbury; Attendance: 38,074; Referee: Jeff Winter

1 January 2003 22	Newcastle United	1–0	Liverpool	Newcastle-upon-Tyne
	Robert 13'	Report	Diao (red card) 66'	Stadium: St. James' Park; Attendance: 52,147; Referee: Dermot Gallagher

11 January 2003 23	Liverpool	1–1	Aston Villa	Liverpool
15:00 GMT	Owen 38'	Report	Dublin 49' (pen.)	Stadium: Anfield; Attendance: 43,210; Referee: Paul Durkin

18 January 2003 24	Southampton	0–1	Liverpool	Southampton
15:00 GMT		Report	Heskey 14'	Stadium: St. Mary's; Attendance: 32,104; Referee: Steve Bennett

29 January 2003 25	Liverpool	2–2	Arsenal	Liverpool
	Riise 52'; Heskey 90'	Report	Pires 9'; Bergkamp 63'	Stadium: Anfield; Attendance: 43,668; Referee: Mark Halsey

2 February 2003 26	West Ham United	0–3	Liverpool	London
		Report	Baroš 7'; Gerrard 9'; Heskey 67'	Stadium: Boleyn Ground; Attendance: 35,033; Referee: Matt Messias

8 February 2003 27	Liverpool	1–1	Middlesbrough	Liverpool
15:00 GMT	Riise 74'	Report	Geremi 27'	Stadium: Anfield; Attendance: 42,247; Referee: Steve Bennett

23 February 2003 28	Birmingham City	2–1	Liverpool	Birmingham
16:00 GMT	Clemence 34'; Morrison 68'	Report	Owen 77'	Stadium: St Andrew's; Attendance: 29,449; Referee: C Wilkes

8 March 2003 29	Liverpool	2–0	Bolton Wanderers	Liverpool
	Diouf 44'; Owen 67'	Report		Stadium: Anfield; Attendance: 41,462; Referee: Graham Barber

16 March 2003 30	Tottenham Hotspur	2–3	Liverpool	London
	Taricco 48'; Sheringham 87'	Report	Owen 51'; Heskey 72'; Gerrard 82'	Stadium: White Hart Lane; Attendance: 36,077; Referee: Uriah Rennie

23 March 2003 31	Liverpool	3–1	Leeds United	Liverpool
	Owen 12'; Murphy 20'; Gerrard 73'	Report	Viduka 44'	Stadium: Anfield; Attendance: 43,021; Referee: Andy D'Urso

5 April 2003 32	Manchester United	4–0	Liverpool	Manchester
	van Nistelrooy 5' (pen.), 65' (pen.); Giggs 78'; Solskjær 90'	Report	Hyypia (red card) 4'	Stadium: Old Trafford; Attendance: 67,639; Referee: Mike Riley

12 April 2003 33	Liverpool	2–0	Fulham	Liverpool
15:00 BST	Heskey 36'; Owen 59'	Report		Stadium: Anfield; Attendance: 42,120; Referee: Alan Wiley

19 April 2003 34	Everton	1–2	Liverpool	Liverpool
15:00 BST	Unsworth 58' (pen.)	Report	Owen 31'; Murphy 54'	Stadium: Goodison Park; Attendance: 40,162; Referee: Paul Durkin

21 April 2003 35	Liverpool	2–1	Charlton Athletic	Liverpool
	Hyypiä 86'; Gerrard 90'	Report	Bartlett 47'	Stadium: Anfield; Attendance: 42,010; Referee: Steve Dunn

26 April 2003 36	West Bromwich Albion	0–6	Liverpool	West Bromwich
15:00 BST		Report	Owen 15', 49', 61', 67'; Baroš 47', 84'	Stadium: The Hawthorns; Attendance: 27,128; Referee: Dermot Gallagher

3 May 2003 37	Liverpool	1–2	Manchester City	Liverpool
	Baroš 59'	Report	Anelka 74' (pen.), 90'	Stadium: Anfield; Attendance: 44,220; Referee: Neale Barry

11 May 2003 38	Chelsea	2–1	Liverpool	London
15:00 BST	Desailly 14'; Grønkjær 27'	Report	Hyypiä 11'	Stadium: Stamford Bridge; Attendance: 41,911; Referee: Alan Wiley

=== FA Cup ===
==== Matches ====
5 January 2003 3	Manchester City	0–1	Liverpool	Manchester
		Report	Murphy 47' (pen.)	Stadium: Maine Road; Attendance: 28,586; Referee: Uriah Rennie

26 January 2003 4	Crystal Palace	0–0	Liverpool	London
		Report		Stadium: Selhurst Park; Attendance: 26,054; Referee: Rob Styles

5 February 2003 4 Replay	Liverpool	0–2	Crystal Palace	Liverpool
		Report	Gray 55'; Henchoz 79' (o.g.)	Stadium: Anfield; Attendance: 35,109; Referee: Phil Dowd

=== League Cup ===
==== Matches ====
6 November 2002 3	Liverpool	3–1	Southampton	Liverpool
	Berger 45'; Diouf 57'; Baroš 60'	Report	Delgado 55'	Stadium: Anfield; Attendance: 35,870; Referee: Phil Dowd

4 December 2002 4	Liverpool	1–1 (a.e.t.) (5–4 p)	Ipswich Town	Liverpool
	Diouf 54' (pen.)	Report	Miller 14'	Stadium: Anfield; Attendance: 26,305; Referee: Dermot Gallagher
	Penalties
	Gerrard (penalty scored); Baroš (penalty scored); Riise (penalty scored); Carragher (penalty scored); Diouf (penalty scored)		Holland (penalty scored); Clapham (penalty missed); Magilton (penalty scored); Miller (penalty scored); Armstrong (penalty scored)

18 December 2002 Quarter-final	Aston Villa	3–4	Liverpool	Birmingham
	Vassell 23' (pen.); Hitzlsperger 72'; Henchoz 88' (o.g.)	Report	Murphy 27', 90'; Baroš 54'; Gerrard 67'	Stadium: Villa Park; Attendance: 38,530; Referee: Graham Barber

8 January 2003 Semi-final; First leg	Sheffield United	2–1	Liverpool	Sheffield
	Tonge 76', 82'	Report	Mellor 35'	Stadium: Bramall Lane; Attendance: 30,095; Referee: Mike Dean

21 January 2003 Semi-final; Second leg	Liverpool	2–0 (a.e.t.)	Sheffield United	Liverpool
	Diouf 9'; Owen 107'	Report		Stadium: Anfield; Attendance: 43,837; Referee: Alan Wiley

2 March 2003 Final	Liverpool	2–0	Manchester United	Cardiff
	Gerrard 39'; Owen 86'	Report		Stadium: Millennium Stadium; Attendance: 74,500; Referee: Paul Durkin

=== Champions League ===
==== Group B ====
Pos	Team	Pld	W	D	L	GF	GA	GD	Pts	Qualification	VAL	BSL	LIV	SPM
1	(Spain) Valencia	6	5	1	0	17	4	+13	16	Advance to second group stage	—	6–2	2–0	3–0
2	(Switzerland) Basel	6	2	3	1	12	12	0	9	Advance to second group stage	2–2	—	3–3	2–0
3	(England) Liverpool	6	2	2	2	12	8	+4	8	Transfer to UEFA Cup	0–1	1–1	—	5–0
4	(Russia) Spartak Moscow	6	0	0	6	1	18	−17	0		0–3	0–2	1–3	—

Source: RSSSF

==== Matches ====
17 September 2002 1	Valencia (Spain)	2–0	Liverpool	Valencia, Spain
20:45 CEST	Pablo Aimar 20'; Baraja 38'	Report	Hamann (red card)	Stadium: Mestalla; Attendance: 43,000; Referee: (Germany) Herbert Fandel

25 September 2002 2	Liverpool	1–1	(Switzerland) Basel	Liverpool
19:45 BST	Baroš 34'	Report	Rossi 42'	Stadium: Anfield; Attendance: 37,634; Referee: (Netherlands) Dick Van Egmond

2 October 2002 3	Liverpool	5–0	(Russia) Spartak Moscow	Liverpool
19:45 BST	Heskey 7', 90'; Cheyrou 15'; Hyypiä 29'; Diao 81'	Report		Stadium: Anfield; Attendance: 40,812; Referee: (Luxembourg) Alain Hamer

22 October 2002 4	Spartak Moscow (Russia)	1–3	Liverpool	Moscow, Russia
20:00 MSD	Danishevsky 23'	Report	Owen 29', 70', 90'	Stadium: Dynamo Stadium; Attendance: 15,000; Referee: (Austria) Konrad Plautz

30 October 2002 5	Liverpool	0–1	(Spain) Valencia	Liverpool
19:45 GMT		Report	Rufete 34'	Stadium: Anfield; Attendance: 41,831; Referee: (Norway) Terje Hauge

12 November 2002 6	Basel (Switzerland)	3–3	Liverpool	Basel, Switzerland
20:45 CET	Rossi 2'; Giménez 22'; Atouba 29'	Report	Murphy 61'; Šmicer 64'; Owen 85'	Stadium: St. Jakob-Park; Attendance: 35,000; Referee: (France) Claude Colombo

=== UEFA Cup ===
==== Matches ====
28 November 2002 Third round First leg	Vitesse (Netherlands)	0–1	Liverpool	Arnhem, Netherlands
		Report	Owen 26'	Stadium: GelreDome; Attendance: 28,500; Referee: (Spain) Manuel Mejuto González

12 December 2002 Third round Second leg	Liverpool	1–0	(Netherlands) Vitesse	Liverpool, England
	Owen 21'	Report		Stadium: Anfield; Attendance: 23,576; Referee: (Germany) Wolfgang Stark

20 February 2003 Fourth round First leg	Auxerre (France)	0–1	Liverpool	Auxerre, France
		Report	Hyypiä 72'	Stadium: Stade de l'Abbé-Deschamps; Attendance: 20,452; Referee: (Italy) Massimo De Santis

27 February 2003 Fourth round Second leg	Liverpool	2–0	(France) Auxerre	Liverpool, England
	Owen 66'; Murphy 72'	Report		Stadium: Anfield; Attendance: 34,252; Referee: (Spain) Antonio Jesús López Nieto

13 March 2003 Quarter-final; First leg	Celtic (Scotland)	1–1	Liverpool	Glasgow, Scotland
	Larsson 2'	Report	Heskey 17'	Stadium: Celtic Park; Attendance: 59,759; Referee: (Norway) Terje Hauge

20 March 2003 Quarter-finals; Second leg	Liverpool	0–2	(Scotland) Celtic	Liverpool, England
		Report	Thompson 45'; Hartson 82'	Stadium: Anfield; Attendance: 44,238; Referee: (Germany) Markus Merk
