= 2007–08 Stade Rennais FC season =

Rennes
2007–08 season
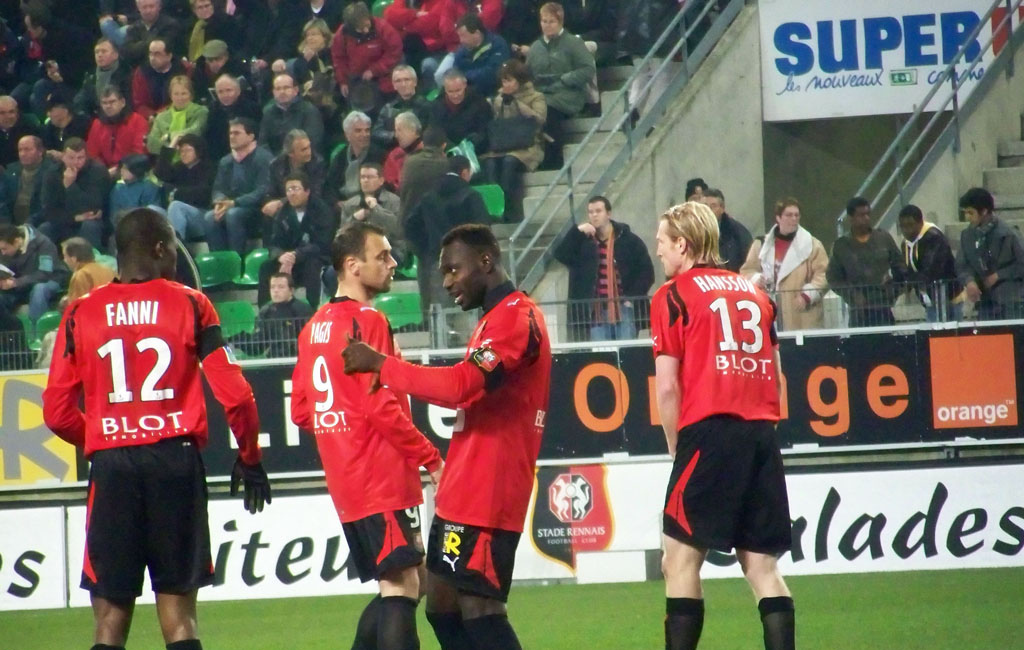
- President: Frédéric de Saint-Sernin
- Head coach: Pierre Dréossi (until 16 December); Guy Lacombe (from 17 December)
- Stadium: Stade de la Route de Lorient
- Ligue 1: 6th
- Coupe de France: Round of 32
- Coupe de la Ligue: Round of 16
- UEFA Cup: Group stage
- Top goalscorer: League: Mickaël Pagis (12); All: Mickaël Pagis (13)
- Highest home attendance: 29,278 vs Marseille
- Average home league attendance: 25,515
Home colours	Away colours	Third colours

The 2007–08 season was the 106th season in the history of Stade Rennais FC and the club's 14th consecutive season in the top flight of French football. In addition to the domestic league, Rennes participated in this season's editions of the Coupe de France and Coupe de la Ligue.

== Competitions ==
=== Overall record ===
Competition	First match	Last match	Starting round	Final position	Record							
Competition	First match	Last match	Starting round	Final position	Pld	W	D	L	GF	GA	GD	Win %
Ligue 1	4 August 2007	15 May 2008	Matchday 1	6th	38	16	10	12	47	44	+3	42.11
Coupe de France	6 January 2008	2 February 2008	Round of 64	Round of 32	2	1	1	0	3	0	+3	50.00
Coupe de la Ligue	26 September 2007	31 October 2007	Third round	Round of 16	2	1	0	1	1	2	−1	50.00
UEFA Cup	20 September 2007	20 December 2007	First round	Group stage	6	1	2	3	6	9	−3	16.67
Total					48	19	13	16	57	55	+2	39.58

Source: Competitions

=== Ligue 1 ===
==== League table ====
Pos	Team	Pld	W	D	L	GF	GA	GD	Pts	Qualification or relegation
4	Nancy	38	15	15	8	44	30	+14	60	Qualification to UEFA Cup first round
5	Saint-Étienne	38	16	10	12	47	34	+13	58	Qualification to UEFA Cup first round
6	Rennes	38	16	10	12	47	44	+3	58	Qualification to Intertoto Cup third round
7	Lille	38	13	18	7	45	32	+13	57	
8	Nice	38	13	16	9	35	30	+5	55	

Source: Ligue 1
Rules for classification: 1) points; 2) goal difference; 3) number of goals scored.

==== Results summary ====
Overall								Home						Away					
Pld	W	D	L	GF	GA	GD	Pts	W	D	L	GF	GA	GD	W	D	L	GF	GA	GD
38	16	10	12	47	44	+3	58	10	2	7	27	19	+8	6	8	5	20	25	−5

Source: Ligue 1

==== Results by round ====
Round	1	2	3	4	5	6	7	8	9	10	11	12	13	14	15	16	17	18	19	20	21	22	23	24	25	26	27	28	29	30	31	32	33	34	35	36	37	38
Ground	H	A	H	A	H	A	H	A	H	A	H	A	H	A	H	A	A	H	A	H	A	H	A	H	A	H	A	H	A	H	A	H	A	H	H	A	H	A
Result	L	D	W	D	W	W	D	W	L	W	W	W	L	L	L	L	L	L	D	W	L	D	D	L	L	W	D	W	D	W	W	L	D	W	W	D	W	W
Position	19	18	10	10	8	5	6	4	6	5	3	3	3	4	4	7	9	13	13	9	12	11	11	14	17	13	14	10	10	10	5	6	10	7	7	7	7	6

Source: Ligue 1
A = Away; H = Home; W = Win; D = Draw; L = Loss

==== Matches ====
4 August 2007 1	Rennes	0–2	Nancy	Rennes
				Stadium: Stade de la Route de Lorient

11 August 2007 2	Marseille	0–0	Rennes	Marseille
				Stadium: Stade Vélodrome

15 August 2007 3	Rennes	1–0	Saint-Étienne	Rennes
				Stadium: Stade de la Route de Lorient

19 August 2007 4	Nice	1–1	Rennes	Nice
				Stadium: Stade du Ray

25 August 2007 5	Rennes	2–0	Metz	Rennes
				Stadium: Stade de la Route de Lorient

29 August 2007 6	Auxerre	0–2	Rennes	Auxerre
				Stadium: Stade de l'Abbé Deschamps

1 September 2007 7	Rennes	2–2	Lille	Rennes
				Stadium: Stade de la Route de Lorient

16 September 2007 8	Lorient	0–1	Rennes	Lorient
				Stadium: Stade du Moustoir

23 September 2007 9	Rennes	0–2	Sochaux	Rennes
				Stadium: Stade de la Route de Lorient

6 October 2007 10	Paris Saint-Germain	1–3	Rennes	Paris
				Stadium: Parc des Princes

20 October 2007 11	Rennes	3–0	Le Mans	Rennes
				Stadium: Stade de la Route de Lorient

28 October 2007 12	Lens	1–2	Rennes	Lens
				Stadium: Stade Félix Bollaert

3 November 2007 13	Rennes	0–1	Monaco	Rennes
				Stadium: Stade de la Route de Lorient

11 November 2007 14	Bordeaux	3–0	Rennes	Bordeaux
				Stadium: Stade Chaban-Delmas

24 November 2007 15	Rennes	0–2	Lyon	Rennes
				Stadium: Stade de la Route de Lorient

2 December 2007 16	Valenciennes	3–0	Rennes	Valenciennes
				Stadium: Stade Nungesser

8 December 2007 17	Strasbourg	3–0	Rennes	Strasbourg
				Stadium: Stade de la Meinau

15 December 2007 18	Rennes	1–2	Caen	Rennes
				Stadium: Stade de la Route de Lorient

23 December 2007 19	Toulouse	0–0	Rennes	Toulouse
				Stadium: Stade de Toulouse

13 January 2008 20	Rennes	3–1	Marseille	Rennes
				Stadium: Stade de la Route de Lorient; Attendance: 29,278

19 January 2008 21	Saint-Étienne	2–0	Rennes	Saint-Étienne
				Stadium: Stade Geoffroy Guichard

23 January 2008 22	Rennes	1–1	Nice	Rennes
				Stadium: Stade de la Route de Lorient; Attendance: 23,241

26 January 2008 23	Metz	1–1	Rennes	Metz
				Stadium: Stade Saint-Symphorien

9 February 2008 24	Rennes	1–2	Auxerre	Rennes
				Stadium: Stade de la Route de Lorient; Attendance: 22,733

16 February 2008 25	Lille	3–1	Rennes	Lille
				Stadium: Stadium Lille Métropole

23 February 2008 26	Rennes	2–0	Lorient	Rennes
				Stadium: Stade de la Route de Lorient; Attendance: 24,633

1 March 2008 27	Sochaux	0–0	Rennes	Montbéliard
20:00				Stadium: Stade Auguste Bonal

8 March 2008 28	Rennes	2–0	Paris Saint-Germain	Rennes
17:10				Stadium: Stade de la Route de Lorient; Attendance: 27,523

15 March 2008 29	Le Mans	1–1	Rennes	Le Mans
				Stadium: Stade Léon Bollée

23 March 2008 30	Rennes	3–1	Lens	Rennes
19:00				Stadium: Stade de la Route de Lorient; Attendance: 24,411

31 March 2008 31	Monaco	1–2	Rennes	Monaco
				Stadium: Stade Louis II

5 April 2008 32	Rennes	0–2	Bordeaux	Rennes
17:10			Diarra 18'; Menegazzo 83'	Stadium: Stade de la Route de Lorient; Attendance: 28,124; Referee: Stéphane Lannoy

12 April 2008 33	Lyon	1–1	Rennes	Lyon
17:10	Cris 16'		Mbia 90+2'	Stadium: Stade de Gerland; Attendance: 39,900; Referee: Laurent Duhamel

19 April 2008 34	Rennes	1–0	Valenciennes	Rennes
				Stadium: Stade de la Route de Lorient; Attendance: 26,532

26 April 2008 35	Rennes	3–0	Strasbourg	Rennes
				Stadium: Stade de la Route de Lorient; Attendance: 24,318

3 May 2008 36	Caen	2–2	Rennes	Caen
				Stadium: Stade Michel d'Ornano

10 May 2008 37	Rennes	2–1	Toulouse	Rennes
				Stadium: Stade de la Route de Lorient; Attendance: 28,078

17 May 2008 38	Nancy	2–3	Rennes	Tomblaine
20:50				Stadium: Stade Marcel Picot; Attendance: 19,563; Referee: Stéphane Lannoy

=== Coupe de France ===
6 January 2008 Round of 64	Martigues	0–3	Rennes	Martigues
15:15			Wiltord 30'; Briand 50'; Lemoine 68'	Stadium: Stade Francis Turcan; Attendance: 3,000; Referee: Jérôme Auroux

2 February 2008 Round of 32	Lorient	0–0 (a.e.t.) (3–1 p)	Rennes	Lorient
20:00				Stadium: Stade du Moustoir; Attendance: 11,661; Referee: Laurent Duhamel

=== Coupe de la Ligue ===
26 September 2007 Round of 32	Clermont	0–1 (a.e.t.)	Rennes	Clermont-Ferrand
20:00			Thomert 114'	Stadium: Stade Gabriel Montpied; Attendance: 5,499; Referee: Sandryk Biton

31 October 2007 Round of 16	Rennes	0–2	Valenciennes	Rennes
18:00			Traoré 24'; Pujol 75'	Stadium: Stade de la Route de Lorient; Attendance: 14,748; Referee: Éric Poulat

== Statistics ==
=== Appearances and goals ===
No.	Pos	Nat	Player	Total		Ligue 1		Coupe de France		Coupe de la Ligue		UEFA Cup	
No.	Pos	Nat	Player	Apps	Goals	Apps	Goals	Apps	Goals	Apps	Goals	Apps	Goals
Goalkeepers
	GK	(France) FRA	Simon Pouplin	19	0	19	0	0	0	0	0	0	0
	GK	(France) FRA	Patrice Luzi	19	0	19	0	0	0	0	0	0	0
Defenders
	DF	(France) FRA	Guillaume Borne	5	0	5	0	0	0	0	0	0	0
	DF	(France) FRA	Bira Dembélé	7	0	7	0	0	0	0	0	0	0
	DF	(Nigeria) NGA	Elderson Echiéjilé	4	0	4	0	0	0	0	0	0	0
	DF	(Sweden) SWE	Erik Edman	12	0	12	0	0	0	0	0	0	0
	DF	(Mali) MLI	Djimi Traoré	15	0	15	0	0	0	0	0	0	0
	DF	(Ghana) GHA	John Mensah	25	0	25	0	0	0	0	0	0	0
	DF	(France) FRA	Rod Fanni	28	0	28	0	0	0	0	0	0	0
	DF	(Sweden) SWE	Petter Hansson	35	0	35	0	0	0	0	0	0	0
Midfielders
	MF	(France) FRA		0	0	0	0	0	0	0	0	0	0
	MF	(France) FRA		0	0	0	0	0	0	0	0	0	0
Forwards
	FW	(Qatar) QAT	Emerson Sheik	3	0	3	0	0	0	0	0	0	0
	FW	(Switzerland) SUI	Julián Estéban	3	0	3	0	0	0	0	0	0	0
	FW	(Senegal) SEN	Lhadji Badiane	5	0	5	0	0	0	0	0	0	0
	FW	(France) FRA	Jirès Kembo Ekoko	7	0	7	0	0	0	0	0	0	0
	FW	(France) FRA	Daniel Moreira	10	0	10	0	0	0	0	0	0	0
	FW	(France) FRA	Mickaël Pagis	31	11	31	11	0	0	0	0	0	0

Last updated: May 2008
Source: Competitions
