= Djimi Traoré =

Malian football manager (born 1980)

Personal information
- Date of birth: 1 March 1980 (age 46)
- Place of birth: Saint-Ouen, Seine-Saint-Denis, France
- Height: 1.91 m (6 ft 3 in)
- Position: Defender

Team information
- Current team: Right to Dream Academy (coach)

Senior career*
Years	Team	Apps	(Gls)
1996–1999	Laval	5	(0)
1999–2006	Liverpool	88	(0)
2001–2002	→ Lens (loan)	19	(0)
2006–2007	Charlton Athletic	11	(0)
2007–2009	Portsmouth	13	(0)
2008	→ Rennes (loan)	15	(0)
2009	→ Birmingham City (loan)	3	(0)
2009–2011	Monaco	36	(0)
2011–2012	Marseille	11	(0)
2013–2014	Seattle Sounders	42	(1)
Total		243	(1)

International career
2004–2006	Mali	6	(1)

Managerial career
- 2015: Seattle Sounders 2 (assistant)
- 2016–2021: Seattle Sounders (assistant)
- * Club domestic league appearances and goals

Djimi Traoré (born 1 March 1980) is a professional football coach and former player who played as a left-back or centre-back. He is a coach for the Right to Dream Academy. Born in France, Traoré played for the Mali national team.

At club level, Traoré played for Laval, Liverpool – with whom he won multiple honours including the 2004–05 Champions League – Lens, Charlton Athletic, Portsmouth, Rennes, Birmingham City, Monaco, Marseille and Seattle Sounders.

== Club career ==
=== Liverpool ===
Traoré started his career at local club Laval before moving on to Liverpool. He made his debut for the Reds on 14 September 1999 in a 5–1 win over Hull City in the League Cup.

In the 2001–02 season, Traoré was loaned to Lens for the season, during which he made 19 appearances. He returned to Anfield for the 2002–03 season, scoring his first (and what turned out to be his only) Liverpool goal in the UEFA Cup against Steaua București.

Traoré spent the 2003–04 season, manager Gérard Houllier's last at the club, in the reserve team, of which he was captain, and almost left Liverpool for their Merseyside neighbours Everton on the 2004 transfer deadline day, but was convinced to remain at Liverpool by their new manager Rafael Benítez.

The defender's career appeared to have been revitalised by Benítez: While the defender had appeared poor positionally, and seemed reluctant to attack, particularly during the 2004–05 season, he showed more willingness to support the left winger, as well as improving his positional play.

Traoré scored an own goal in the third round of the 2004–05 FA Cup against then Championship side Burnley, as he attempted a turn and drag-back within his own six-yard box. It turned out to be the only goal of the game and handed Burnley a 1–0 victory over their Premiership opponents.

Traoré remained a regular at Liverpool, and eventually made the starting line-up as Liverpool qualified for the 2005 UEFA Champions League final against Milan. After conceding the free kick that led to Paolo Maldini's goal in the opening minute, In the second half his play improved, and a goalline clearance to deny Andriy Shevchenko a likely winner contributed to his winning a Champions League medal as Liverpool fought back from 3–0 down to draw 3–3 and beat Milan 3–2 on penalties.

In the 2005–06 season, Traoré found his first team appearances limited, with John Arne Riise and Stephen Warnock also starting regularly at left back. He was an unused substitute as Liverpool beat West Ham United on penalties to win the 2006 FA Cup final at the Millennium Stadium. This was to be his last season with Liverpool, and, although he had played some part in Liverpool's pre-season in 2006, he was sold to Charlton Athletic for £2 million on 8 August 2006.

=== Charlton Athletic and Portsmouth ===
Traoré was sent off on his Charlton Athletic debut on 19 August, after receiving two yellow cards, the latter of which was for preventing a free kick being taken. This was the fifth time in eight seasons an Addicks player had been sent off in the first game of the season. On 16 December, he conceded a penalty against Liverpool, his former club, for a tackle on Jermaine Pennant. He was soon deemed surplus to requirements at Charlton. After only half a season at the Valley, Traoré was allowed to leave the club by new manager Alan Pardew, joining Portsmouth.

==== Birmingham City (loan) ====
On 10 February 2009, Traoré joined Birmingham City, then of the Championship, on a three-month emergency loan. He sustained a hamstring injury later the same month, and finally made his debut for the club in April as a late substitute against Watford.

=== Monaco ===
On 18 June 2009, Traore signed a two-year deal with Monaco, moving from Portsmouth after his loan period at Birmingham expired.

=== Marseille ===
On 18 August 2011, Traoré signed a one-year contract with Ligue 1 club Marseille. He was an unused substitute as Marseille won the 2012 Coupe de la Ligue final, and left the club at the end of the season.

=== Seattle Sounders ===
On 23 February 2013, Traoré signed with Major League Soccer club Seattle Sounders after a successful preseason trial. He scored his first goal for the club in spectacular fashion, a 30 yd (27 m) volley off the underside of the crossbar, during a CONCACAF Champions League quarterfinal match against Tigres. Traoré's goal equalized their match with Tigres 2–2 on aggregate, and preceded Eddie Johnson's 75th-minute game-winning goal, allowing the Sounders to become the first MLS club to eliminate a Mexican side in the history of the Champions League. Traoré's first ever league goal came on 8 May 2013 as the Sounders beat Sporting Kansas City 1–0 in Kansas City. The goal was a game-winning volley in the 94th minute to give the Sounders just their second win of the 2013 season in their first eight games. Traoré retired at the end of the 2014 season.

== Coaching career ==
Traoré was an assistant coach with Seattle Sounders until 12 August 2021.

== Career statistics ==
Appearances and goals by club, season and competition
Club	Season	League			National cup		League cup		Other		Total	
Club	Season	Division	Apps	Goals	Apps	Goals	Apps	Goals	Apps	Goals	Apps	Goals
Laval	1997–98	Division 2	1	0	0	0	0	0	—		1	0
Laval	1998–99	Division 2	4	0	0	0	0	0	—		4	0
Laval	Total		5	0	0	0	0	0	—		5	0
Liverpool	1998–99	Premier League	0	0	—		—		—		0	0
Liverpool	1999–2000	Premier League	0	0	0	0	2	0	0	0	2	0
Liverpool	2000–01	Premier League	8	0	0	0	1	0	3 (Note: Appearances in UEFA Cup)	0	12	0
Liverpool	2001–02	Premier League	0	0	—		—		1 (Note: Appearances in UEFA Champions League)	0	1	0
Liverpool	2002–03	Premier League	32	0	2	0	3	0	12 (Note: One appearance in FA Community Shield, five in Champions League, six in UEFA Cup)	0	49	0
Liverpool	2003–04	Premier League	7	0	0	0	2	0	2	1	11	1
Liverpool	2004–05	Premier League	26	0	1	0	5	0	10	0	42	0
Liverpool	2005–06	Premier League	15	0	2	0	1	0	6 (Note: Five appearances in Champions League, one in FIFA Club World Cup)	0	24	0
Liverpool	Total		88	0	5	0	14	0	34	1	141	1
Lens (loan)	2001–02	Division 1	19	0	0	0	1	0	—		20	0
Charlton Athletic	2006–07	Premier League	11	0	1	0	1	0	—		13	0
Portsmouth	2006–07	Premier League	10	0	—		—		—		10	0
Portsmouth	2007–08	Premier League	3	0	0	0	2	0	0	0	5	0
Portsmouth	2008–09	Premier League	0	0	0	0	0	0	0	0	0	0
Portsmouth	Total		13	0	0	0	2	0	—		15	0
Rennes (loan)	2007–08	Ligue 1	15	0	0	0	0	0	—		15	0
Birmingham City (loan)	2008–09	Championship	3	0	0	0	0	0	0	0	3	0
Monaco	2009–10	Ligue 1	29	0	6	1	0	0	—		35	1
Monaco	2010–11	Ligue 1	7	0	0	0	1	0	—		8	0
Monaco	Total		36	0	6	1	1	0	0	0	43	1
Marseille	2011–12	Ligue 1	11	0	3	0	3	0	3	0	20	0
Seattle Sounders	2013	MLS	27	1	0	0	—		7 (Note: Three appearances in MLS Cup Playoffs, four appearances and one goal in CONCACAF Champions League)	1	34	2
Seattle Sounders	2014	MLS	15	0	0	0	—		1 (Note: Appearance in MLS Cup Playoffs)	0	16	0
Seattle Sounders	Total		42	1	0	0	—		8	1	50	2
Career total			243	1	15	1	22	0	45	2	325	4

== Honours ==
Liverpool

- FA Cup: 2005–06
- Football League Cup: 2002–03; runner-up 2004–05
- FA Charity Shield: 2001
- UEFA Champions League: 2004–05
- FIFA Club World Championship runner-up: 2005

Marseille

- Coupe de la Ligue: 2011–12

Seattle Sounders

- MLS Supporters' Shield: 2014
