= 2001–02 RC Lens season =

Lens
2001–02 season
- President: Gervais Martel
- Head coach: Joël Müller
- Stadium: Stade Félix-Bollaert
- Division 1: 2nd
- Coupe de France: Round of 16
- Coupe de la Ligue: Round of 32
- Top goalscorer: League: Daniel Moreira (11); All: Daniel Moreira (11)
- Average home league attendance: 37,339
- Biggest win: Lens 7–0 Bastia
- Biggest defeat: Monaco 4–1 Lens

The 2001–02 season was the 95th season in the existence of RC Lens and the club's 13th consecutive season in the top flight of French football. In addition to the domestic league, Lens participated in this season's editions of the Coupe de France and the Coupe de la Ligue. The season covered the period from 1 July 2001 to 30 June 2002.

== First-team squad ==
Squad at end of season

Note: Flags indicate national team as defined under FIFA eligibility rules; some limited exceptions apply. Players may hold more than one non-FIFA nationality.

No.	Pos.	Nation	Player
1	GK	FRA	Guillaume Warmuz (captain)
2	DF	FRA	Éric Sikora
3	FW	FRA	Mathieu Bucher
4	DF	MLI	Adama Coulibaly
5	MF	FRA	Jocelyn Blanchard
6	DF	FRA	Franck Queudrue
7	MF	FRA	Mickaël Debève
8	DF	FRA	Jean-Guy Wallemme
9	FW	FRA	Lamine Sakho
10	MF	FRA	Daniel Moreira
11	FW	SEN	El Hadji Diouf
13	MF	SEN	Pape Sarr
14	DF	SEN	Ferdinand Coly

No.	Pos.	Nation	Player
15	MF	CZE	Radek Bejbl
16	GK	FRA	Sébastien Chabbert
17	DF	FRA	Yoann Lachor
19	DF	FRA	Patrick Barul
20	FW	FRA	Antoine Sibierski
21	DF	FRA	Djimi Traoré
23	MF	YUG	Nenad Grozdić
25	DF	FRA	Valérien Ismaël
26	MF	FRA	Stéphane Pédron
27	DF	MLI	Daouda Jabi
28	MF	FRA	Charles-Édouard Coridon
29	FW	FRA	Ludovic Delporte
30	GK	FRA	Charles Itandje

== Pre-season and friendlies ==
Win Draw Loss

3 July 2001 Friendly	Lens	1–1	Ajaccio	Vichy, France
17:30 CEST (UTC+2)	Moreira 35'		Squillaci 2'
Note: Match was played in three 30-minute periods.

7 July 2001 Friendly	Lens	3–0	Saint-Étienne	Clermont-Ferrand, France
18:00 CEST (UTC+2)

18 July 2001 Friendly	Amiens	0–3	Lens	Amiens, France
19:00 CEST (UTC+2)			Sikora 12'; Blanchard 23'; Rodriguez 83'	Stadium: Stade de la Licorne; Attendance: 6,218; Referee: M. Cotrel

24 July 2001 Friendly	Wasquehal	0–0	Lens	Armentières, France
18:30 CEST (UTC+2)

30 December 2001 Friendly	Wasquehal	0–2	Lens	Wasquehal, France
17:00 CET (UTC+1)			Bąk 59'; Bouden 90'	Stadium: Stade Arthur Buyse; Attendance: 500
Note: Match was played in three 30-minute periods.

20 April 2002 Friendly	Lens	1–1	Amiens	Béthune, France
17:00 CEST (UTC+2)	Diouf 4'		Diallo 75'	Stadium: stade municipal Attendance: 2,000; Referee: M. Lannoy

10 May 2002 Friendly	Lens	1–0	Beauvais	Saint-Omer, France
20:00 CEST (UTC+2)	Bejbl 60'			Stadium: Stade Gaston Bonnet; Attendance: 2,300; Referee: M. Gautier

== Competitions ==
=== Overview ===
Competition	First match	Last match	Starting round	Final position	Record							
Competition	First match	Last match	Starting round	Final position	Pld	W	D	L	GF	GA	GD	Win %
French Division 1	28 July 2001	4 May 2002	Matchday 1	2nd	34	18	10	6	55	30	+25	52.94
Coupe de France	14 December 2001	19 January 2001	Round of 32	Round of 16	2	1	0	1	1	1	+0	50.00
Coupe de la Ligue	1 December 2001		Round of 32	Round of 32	1	0	0	1	1	4	−3	0.00
Total					37	19	10	8	57	35	+22	51.35

Source: Competitions

=== French Division 1 ===
==== League table ====
Pos	Team	Pld	W	D	L	GF	GA	GD	Pts	Qualification or relegation
1	Lyon (C)	34	20	6	8	62	32	+30	66	Qualification to Champions League first group stage
2	Lens	34	18	10	6	55	30	+25	64	Qualification to Champions League first group stage
3	Auxerre	34	16	11	7	48	38	+10	59	Qualification to Champions League third qualifying round
4	Paris Saint-Germain	34	15	13	6	43	24	+19	58	Qualification to UEFA Cup first round
5	Lille	34	15	11	8	39	32	+7	56	Qualification to Intertoto Cup third round

Source: Ligue 1
Rules for classification: 1) points; 2) goal difference; 3) number of goals scored.
(C) Champions

==== Results summary ====
Overall								Home						Away					
Pld	W	D	L	GF	GA	GD	Pts	W	D	L	GF	GA	GD	W	D	L	GF	GA	GD
34	18	10	6	55	30	+25	64	10	7	0	33	7	+26	8	3	6	22	23	−1

Last updated: 4 May 2002.
Source: Ligue 1

==== Results by round ====
Round	1	2	3	4	5	6	7	8	9	10	11	12	13	14	15	16	17	18	19	20	21	22	23	24	25	26	27	28	29	30	31	32	33	34
Ground	H	A	H	A	H	A	H	A	H	A	H	A	H	H	A	H	A	H	A	H	A	H	A	H	A	H	A	H	A	A	H	A	H	A
Result	W	W	W	W	D	D	W	L	D	W	W	W	D	W	D	W	L	W	W	D	W	D	W	W	L	D	W	W	L	D	D	L	W	L
Position	4	1	1	1	1	2	1	3	4	2	1	1	1	1	1	1	1	1	1	1	1	1	1	1	1	1	1	1	1	1	1	1	1	2

Source: Ligue 1
A = Away; H = Home; W = Win; D = Draw; L = Loss

==== Matches ====
28 July 2001 1	Lens	2–0	Lyon	Lens
20:00 CEST (UTC+2)				Stadium: Stade Félix-Bollaert

4 August 2001 2	Nantes	1–2	Lens	Nantes
17:15 CEST (UTC+2)				Stadium: Stade de la Beaujoire

11 August 2001 3	Lens	2–0	Marseille	Lens
20:00 CEST (UTC+2)				Stadium: Stade Félix-Bollaert

18 August 2001 4	Metz	0–1	Lens	Metz
17:15 CEST (UTC+2)				Stadium: Stade Saint-Symphorien

26 August 2001 5	Lens	1–1	Lille	Lens
20:45 CEST (UTC+2)				Stadium: Stade Félix-Bollaert

8 September 2001 6	Paris Saint-Germain	2–2	Lens	Paris
20:00 CEST (UTC+2)				Stadium: Parc de Princes

15 September 2001 7	Lens	3–0	Sochaux	Lens
20:00 CEST (UTC+2)				Stadium: Stade Félix-Bollaert

22 September 2001 8	Monaco	3–0	Lens	Monaco
17:15 CEST (UTC+2)				Stadium: Stade Louis II

29 September 2001 9	Lens	1–1	Auxerre	Lens
20:00 CEST (UTC+2)				Stadium: Stade Félix-Bollaert

13 October 2001 10	Lorient	2–3	Lens	Lorient
20:00 CEST (UTC+2)				Stadium: Stade du Moustoir

20 October 2001 11	Lens	2–0	Montpellier	Lens
20:00 CEST (UTC+2)				Stadium: Stade Félix-Bollaert

27 October 2001 12	Rennes	1–2	Lens	Rennes
17:15 CEST (UTC+2)				Stadium: Stade de la Route de Lorient

4 November 2001 13	Lens	0–0	Bordeaux	Lens
18:00 CET (UTC+1)				Stadium: Stade Félix-Bollaert

17 November 2001 14	Lens	1–0	Sedan	Lens
20:00 CET (UTC+1)				Stadium: Stade Félix-Bollaert

24 November 2001 15	Troyes	1–1	Lens	Troyes
20:00 CET (UTC+1)				Stadium: Stade de l'Aube

28 November 2001 16	Lens	7–0	Bastia	Lens
20:30 CET (UTC+1)				Stadium: Stade Félix-Bollaert

8 December 2001 17	Guingamp	1–0	Lens	Guingamp
20:00 CET (UTC+1)				Stadium: Stade du Roudourou

18 December 2001 18	Lens	3–0	Nantes	Lens
18:00 CET (UTC+1)				Stadium: Stade Félix-Bollaert

21 December 2001 19	Marseille	1–2	Lens	Marseille
20:45 CET (UTC+1)				Stadium: Stade Vélodrome

11 January 2002 21	Lille	0–1	Lens	Lille
20:45 CET (UTC+1)				Stadium: Stade Grimonprez-Jooris

24 January 2002 22	Lens	1–1	Paris Saint-Germain	Lens
20:45 CET (UTC+1)				Stadium: Stade Félix-Bollaert

30 January 2002 23	Sochaux	0–2	Lens	Montbéliard
20:30 CET (UTC+1)				Stadium: Stade Auguste Bonal

2 February 2002 24	Lens	1–0	Monaco	Lens
20:00 CET (UTC+1)				Stadium: Stade Félix-Bollaert

6 February 2002 25	Auxerre	1–0	Lens	Auxerre
20:30 CET (UTC+1)				Stadium: Stade Abbé-Deschamps

16 February 2002 26	Lens	1–1	Lorient	Lens
20:00 CET (UTC+1)				Stadium: Stade Félix-Bollaert

23 February 2002 27	Montpellier	1–2	Lens	Montpellier
17:15 CET (UTC+1)				Stadium: Stade de la Mosson

2 March 2002 20	Lens	2–2	Metz	Lens
17:15 CET (UTC+1)				Stadium: Stade Félix-Bollaert

6 March 2002 28	Lens	2–0	Rennes	Lens
20:30 CET (UTC+1)				Stadium: Stade Félix-Bollaert

17 March 2002 29	Bordeaux	2–1	Lens	Bordeaux
20:45 CET (UTC+1)				Stadium: Stade Chaban-Delmas

23 March 2002 30	Sedan	1–1	Lens	Sedan]
20:00 CET (UTC+1)				Stadium: Stade Louis Dugauguez

6 April 2002 31	Lens	0–0	Troyes	Lens
17:15 CET (UTC+1)				Stadium: Stade Félix-Bollaert

13 April 2002 32	Bastia	3–1	Lens	Furiani
20:00 CET (UTC+1)				Stadium: Stade Armand Cesari

27 April 2002 33	Lens	4–1	Guingamp	Lens
20:00 CET (UTC+1)				Stadium: Stade Félix-Bollaert

4 May 2002 34	Lyon	3–1	Lens	Lyon
20:00 CET (UTC+1)				Stadium: Stade de Gerland

=== Coupe de France ===
14 December 2001 Round of 64	Valenciennes	0–1	Lens	Valenciennes
20:30 CET (UTC+1)		Report	Bucher 73'	Stadium: Stade Nungesser; Attendance: 11,316; Referee: Hervé Piccirillo

19 January 2002 Round of 32	Lens	0–1	Marseille	Lens
17:00 CET (UTC+1)		Report	Rivera 62'	Stadium: Stade Félix-Bollaert; Attendance: 28,630; Referee: Éric Poulat

=== Coupe de la Ligue ===
1 December 2001 Round of 32	Monaco	4–1	Lens	Monaco
--:-- CET (UTC+1)	Nonda 10', 84' (pen.); Nyarko (yellow card) 37'; Bierhoff 57'; Jugović (yellow card) 60' (goal) 75'; Rodriguez (yellow card) 89'	Report	Sibierski 4'; Diouf (yellow card) 35'; Traoré (yellow card) 47'	Stadium: Stade Louis II; Attendance: 6,295; Referee: Laurent Duhamel
