= Stephen Warnock =

English footballer (born 1981)

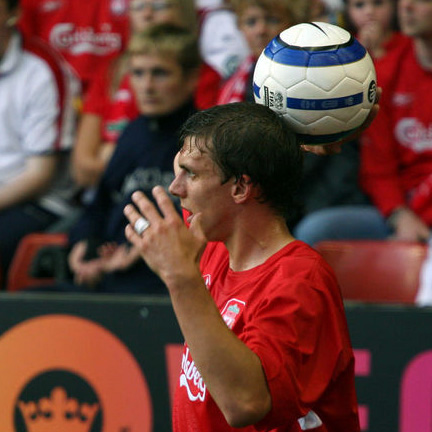
- Warnock in 2005

Personal information
- Full name: Stephen Warnock
- Date of birth: 12 December 1981 (age 44)
- Place of birth: Ormskirk, England
- Height: 5 ft 9 in (1.75 m)
- Position: Left-back

Youth career
- –2002: Liverpool

Senior career*
Years	Team	Apps	(Gls)
2002–2007	Liverpool	40	(1)
2002	→ Bradford City (loan)	12	(1)
2003–2004	→ Coventry City (loan)	44	(3)
2007–2009	Blackburn Rovers	88	(5)
2009–2013	Aston Villa	84	(2)
2012	→ Bolton Wanderers (loan)	15	(0)
2013–2015	Leeds United	64	(3)
2015–2016	Derby County	27	(0)
2016	→ Wigan Athletic (loan)	11	(0)
2016–2017	Wigan Athletic	45	(0)
2017–2018	Burton Albion	14	(1)
2018	→ Bradford City (loan)	13	(0)
Total		457	(16)

International career
1998	England U16	1	(0)
2008–2010	England	2	(0)
- * Club domestic league appearances and goals

Stephen Warnock (born 12 December 1981) is an English former professional footballer who played as a left-back.

Starting off his career at Liverpool, he went on to also represent Coventry City, Bradford City, Blackburn Rovers, Aston Villa, Bolton Wanderers, Leeds United, Derby County, Wigan Athletic and Burton Albion during a career that spanned between 2002 and 2018. A full international between 2008 and 2010, he was capped twice by the England national team and was part of the nation's squad at the 2010 FIFA World Cup.

== Club career ==
=== Liverpool ===
Warnock was born in Ormskirk, Lancashire where, in his childhood, he played for Rufford Colts (based at St Bede's RC High School) and also played for St Bede's RC High School. Following his time spent in the Liverpool youth academy and England youth set up, with his first international cap in the under-16s, he had loan spells at Bradford City (where he scored his first career goal against Sheffield Wednesday) and Coventry City.

Warnock made his first-team debut for Liverpool against Grazer AK on 10 August 2004, in the first leg of a UEFA Champions League third qualifying round match.

In May 2005 he missed out on a place in the squad for the 2005 UEFA Champions League final. He was initially named in the squad but according to Rafa Benitez this was a mistake and was subsequently removed.

In his second season, he was asked to play primarily at left back, in rotation with John Arne Riise. Warnock scored his only goal for Liverpool against Fulham in a 5–1 win on 15 March 2006.

=== Blackburn Rovers ===
In a media speculated swap deal, Blackburn's captain Lucas Neill was reported to being changing clubs with Warnock in both summer 2006 and winter 2007. Eventually Neill joined West Ham United, while on 22 January 2007 Warnock joined Blackburn Rovers for an undisclosed fee believed to be £1.5 million. He made his debut in the FA Cup fourth round in a 4–0 away victory over Luton Town.

On 31 January 2007, he played his first Premier League match for Rovers against Chelsea. He was dismissed for the match after two cautions in the 2–1 victory over Sheffield United on 3 February 2007. Warnock scored his first goal for Blackburn in the 3–0 victory over Portsmouth on 25 February 2007.

On 11 April 2009, before Blackburn Rovers' match against Warnock's former club Liverpool, Stephen presented a flower display displaying the numbers '96' in reference to the 96 Liverpool supporters who lost their lives in the Hillsborough disaster on 15 April 1989. Before the kick off Warnock presented the flowers in front of famous Spion Kop on behalf of Blackburn. This was greeted with chants of 'Stephen Warnock' from the Kop.

=== Aston Villa ===
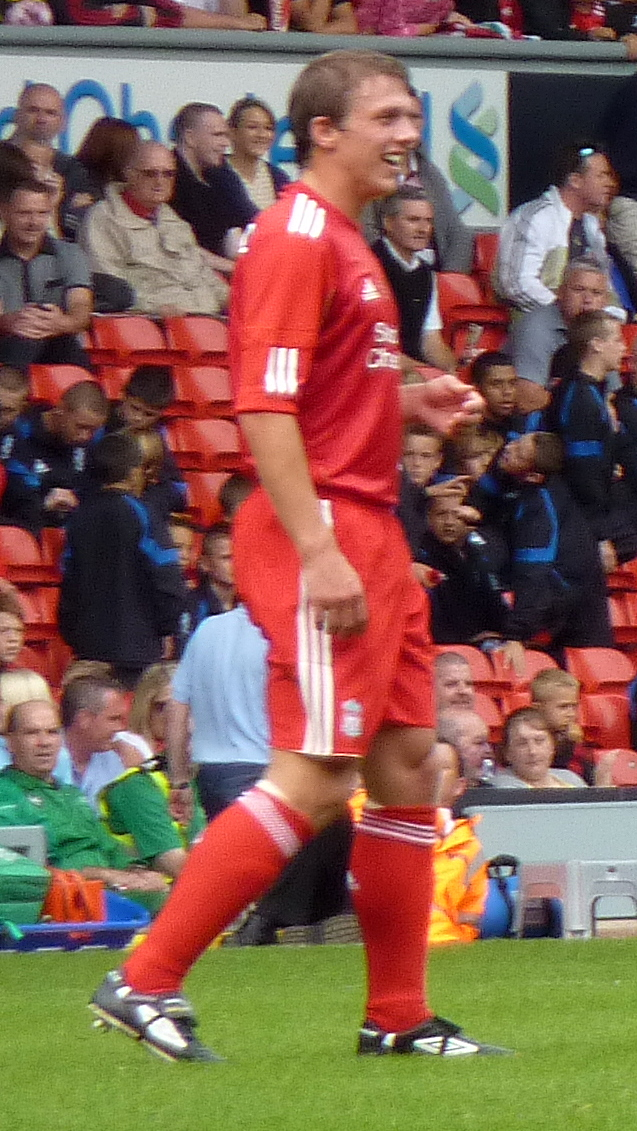
Warnock during Jamie Carragher's testimonial match in 2010

On 26 August 2009, it was confirmed that Aston Villa were in talks with Blackburn over a possible move for Warnock to the Villa Park club. The next day it was confirmed that 27-year-old Warnock had signed a four-year contract with Villa. He scored his first goal for Villa in the League Cup semi-final second leg victory over former club Blackburn Rovers on 20 January 2010, which ended 6–4 to Aston Villa.

From December 2010 onwards, Warnock was out of favour with Aston Villa manager Gérard Houllier and was forced to play with the reserve team. Warnock was widely expected to leave the club in the summer transfer window, with a number of teams reportedly interested in his signature. However, new manager Alex McLeish stated that he was impressed with Warnock's "phenomenal" attitude, and stated he would be given a clean slate, as with other players excluded by Houllier, all but guaranteeing his place in the squad. On 15 October 2011, Warnock scored his first league goal away at Manchester City. Warnock made 35 appearances (all but one of which were starts) for Villa during the 2011–12 season, missing only three Premier League fixtures. During the 2012–13 season under new manager Paul Lambert, Warnock found his chances limited and was made to train with the development squad.

==== Loan to Bolton Wanderers ====
On 21 September 2012, Warnock joined Bolton Wanderers on a three-month loan deal. He was on the bench a day later in their 2–1 win against Sheffield Wednesday and made his debut in their next match, starting at left back in Bolton's 1–0 defeat against Crystal Palace. In his second appearance, at home against Leeds United, Warnock gave away a penalty (which was subsequently scored) as the match finished 2–2. Warnock would play 15 times for Bolton before returning to Villa.

=== Leeds United ===
On transfer deadline day 31 January 2013, Warnock signed a two-and-a-half-year contract at Leeds United. He made his Leeds debut on 9 February 2013, playing the whole match in the club's 2–2 draw against Wolverhampton Wanderers at Molineux. Warnock scored his first goal from the penalty spot for Leeds on 2 March 2013 in a 1–0 win against Millwall. Warnock was named as captain in Brian McDermott's first match in charge on 13 April against Sheffield Wednesday. Before joining Leeds, West Ham United manager Sam Allardyce revealed that Warnock had turned down signing for the Premier League club as Leeds had offered Warnock a longer contract.

In February 2014, in conditions such that, according to the Yorkshire Evening Post, "the ferocious wind was man-of-the-match and the rain would have stripped paint", Warnock's free kick from distance was caught by the wind and dropped over the goalkeeper's head to give Leeds a 2–1 win away to Yeovil Town.

Warnock scored the only goal in a 1–0 win against his former club Bolton on 30 August. During the course of the 2014–15 season, Warnock replaced Jason Pearce as the new Leeds captain. Warnock picked up an injury against Derby County on 30 December 2014, which kept Warnock out of the team and he was subsequently replaced at left back by Charlie Taylor, where Taylor came into the starting lineup for Leeds on 4 January 2015 in Leeds' FA Cup 1–0 defeat against Sunderland.

=== Derby County ===
On 15 January 2015, Warnock signed for Derby County for an undisclosed fee.

=== Wigan Athletic ===
Warnock joined Wigan Athletic on a one-year contract on 30 May 2016.

=== Burton Albion ===
On 26 June 2017, Warnock signed for Championship club Burton Albion on a free transfer on a one-year contract. He scored his first goal for Burton in a 2–1 win against Fulham on 16 September 2017.

=== Bradford City and retirement ===
On 26 January 2018, Warnock joined Bradford City on loan for the rest of the 2017–18 season. In April 2018, he announced that he would retire at the end of the season.

== International career ==
Warnock was capped by the England schools team before making one appearance for the under-16s against Norway on 6 April 1998.

Despite having made relatively few first team appearances for Liverpool, 23-year-old Warnock was called into the senior England squad for the first time on 29 August 2005, due to lack of cover in the squad at left back. He was again called into the squad by England coach Fabio Capello in May 2008 for the friendlies against the United States and Trinidad and Tobago. He made his England debut against the latter on 1 June coming on as a substitute for Wayne Bridge in the 84th minute.

After impressing with Aston Villa in the early 2009–10 season Warnock received a call up to the international squad once more for a friendly against Egypt. On 11 May 2010, Warnock was named in the 30-man provisional squad for the 2010 FIFA World Cup in South Africa. On 1 June 2010, he was named in the final 23-man selection by manager Fabio Capello, ahead of other left back Leighton Baines. Due to the widely accepted adeptness of Ashley Cole at left back, Warnock did not feature in any of England's matches during their short-lived run in the World Cup which ended against Germany. On 7 June 2010, he played in a friendly match against Platinum Stars before the tournament. This does not count towards a full cap, as it was not played against a full international side. The 28-year-old made his second and final appearance for England against France in November 2010.

In May 2012, Scotland manager Craig Levein made an approach to Warnock to play for them. Warnock remained eligible for Scotland as his England caps all came in friendly matches.

== Media work ==
Since his retirement, Warnock has become a regular football pundit on radio and television, covering the Premier League, Champions League, Europa League, Copa Libertadores, and EFL for the BBC, BT Sport, DAZN, Quest TV, and NBC Sports.

In 2024, Warnock took part in the Sky Sports News Real Talk series, where he opened up about his struggle with depression and suicidal thoughts following his retirement from football.

== Career statistics ==
=== Club ===
Appearances and goals by club, season and competition
Club	Season	League			FA Cup		League Cup		Other		Total	
Club	Season	Division	Apps	Goals	Apps	Goals	Apps	Goals	Apps	Goals	Apps	Goals
Liverpool	2002–03	Premier League	0	0	0	0	0	0	0	0	0	0
Liverpool	2003–04	Premier League	0	0	—		—		—		0	0
Liverpool	2004–05	Premier League	19	0	1	0	4	0	6 (Note: Appearances in UEFA Champions League)	0	30	0
Liverpool	2005–06	Premier League	20	1	2	0	1	0	7 (Note: Six appearances in UEFA Champions League, one in FIFA Club World Championship)	0	30	1
Liverpool	2006–07	Premier League	1	0	0	0	3	0	3	0	7	0
Liverpool	Total		40	1	3	0	8	0	16	0	67	1
Bradford City (loan)	2002–03	First Division	12	1	—		—		—		12	1
Coventry City (loan)	2003–04	First Division	44	3	3	0	2	0	—		49	3
Blackburn Rovers	2006–07	Premier League	13	1	5	0	—		2 (Note: Appearances in UEFA Cup)	0	20	1
Blackburn Rovers	2007–08	Premier League	37	1	0	0	2	0	6 (Note: Two appearances in UEFA Intertoto Cup, four appearances and one goal in UEFA Cup)	1	45	2
Blackburn Rovers	2008–09	Premier League	37	3	3	0	3	0	—		43	3
Blackburn Rovers	2009–10	Premier League	1	0	—		0	0	—		1	0
Blackburn Rovers	Total		88	5	8	0	5	0	8	1	109	6
Aston Villa	2009–10	Premier League	30	0	6	0	5	1	—		41	1
Aston Villa	2010–11	Premier League	19	0	0	0	2	0	1 (Note: Appearance in UEFA Europa League)	0	22	0
Aston Villa	2011–12	Premier League	35	2	2	0	1	0	—		38	2
Aston Villa	2012–13	Premier League	0	0	0	0	0	0	—		0	0
Aston Villa	Total		84	2	8	0	8	2	1	0	101	3
Bolton Wanderers (loan)	2012–13	Championship	15	0	—		—		—		15	0
Leeds United	2012–13	Championship	16	1	1	0	—		—		17	1
Leeds United	2013–14	Championship	27	1	0	0	1	0	—		28	1
Leeds United	2014–15	Championship	21	1	0	0	1	0	—		22	1
Leeds United	Total		64	3	1	0	2	0	—		67	3
Derby County	2014–15	Championship	7	0	1	0	—		—		8	0
Derby County	2015–16	Championship	20	0	2	0	—		0	0	22	0
Derby County	Total		27	0	3	0	0	0	0	0	30	0
Wigan Athletic (loan)	2015–16	League One	11	0	—		—		—		11	0
Wigan Athletic	2016–17	Championship	45	0	2	0	1	0	—		48	0
Wigan Athletic	Total		56	0	2	0	1	0	—		59	0
Burton Albion	2017–18	Championship	14	1	0	0	1	0	—		15	1
Bradford City (loan)	2017–18	League One	13	0	—		—		—		13	0
Career total			457	16	30	0	28	2	25	1	553	19

=== International ===
Appearances and goals by national team and year
National team	Year	Apps	Goals
England	2008	1	0
England	2009	0	0
England	2010	1	0
Total		2	0

== Honours ==
Liverpool

- UEFA Super Cup: 2005
- FIFA Club World Championship runner-up: 2005
- UEFA Champions League: 2004–05

Aston Villa

- Football League Cup runner-up: 2009–10

Wigan Athletic

- Football League One: 2015–16

Individual

- Coventry City F.C. Player of the Year: 2003–04
- Blackburn Rovers Player of the Year: 2008–09
