= Mody Traoré =

French footballer (born 1980)

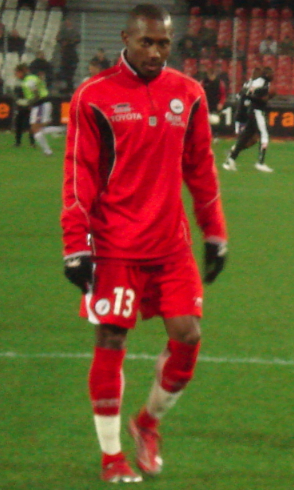

Personal information
- Date of birth: 14 July 1980 (age 46)
- Place of birth: Metz, France
- Height: 1.73 m (5 ft 8 in)
- Position: Defender

Youth career
- 1997–2000: Nancy

Senior career*
Years	Team	Apps	(Gls)
2000–2014	Valenciennes	98	(0)
2010	→ Ajaccio (loan)	13	(1)
2010–2011	→ Le Havre (loan)	23	(0)
Total		134	(1)
- * Club domestic league appearances and goals

Mody Traoré (born 14 July 1980) is a French retired professional footballer who played as a defender.

== Career ==
Born in Metz, Traoré played youth football for Nancy. Apart from two loan stints at Ajaccio and Le Havre, he spent all of his career with Valenciennes.

== Personal life ==
Traoré also holds Senegalese nationality. His brothers Dame and Mamadou are also footballers.
