= Richie Partridge =

Irish footballer (born 1980)

Personal information
- Full name: Richard Joseph Partridge
- Date of birth: 12 September 1980 (age 46)
- Place of birth: Dublin, Ireland
- Height: 1.73 m (5 ft 8 in)
- Position: Midfielder

Youth career
- 19xx–2000: Stella Maris

Senior career*
| Years | Team | Apps | (Gls) |
| 2000–2005 | Liverpool | 0 | (0) |
| 2001 | → Bristol Rovers (loan) | 6 | (1) |
| 2002–2003 | → Coventry City (loan) | 27 | (4) |
| 2005–2006 | Sheffield Wednesday | 18 | (0) |
| 2006–2007 | Rotherham United | 33 | (3) |
| 2007–2009 | Chester City | 65 | (5) |
| 2009–2010 | Milton Keynes Dons | 5 | (0) |
| 2009 | → Kettering Town (loan) | 2 | (1) |
| 2010 | Stockport County | 22 | (1) |
| 2010–2011 | The New Saints | 26 | (11) |
| 2012–2013 | Airbus UK Broughton | 11 | (1) |
| Total | | 219 | (27) |

International career
| 1996 | Republic of Ireland U17 | 1 | (0) |
| 1997–1999 | Republic of Ireland U18 | 12 | (1) |
| 1999–2000 | Republic of Ireland U21 | 8 | (0) |
- * Club domestic league appearances and goals

Richard Joseph Partridge (born 12 September 1980) is an Irish retired footballer who played as a midfielder. Active in senior football between 2000 and 2013, he was capped at Under 17, 18 and Under 21 level by the Irish national team, called up by the senior national team in 2002, and played for nine English clubs before finishing his career in the Welsh Premier League.

== Football career ==
=== Club career ===
==== Liverpool ====
Born in Dublin, Partridge started playing football as a trainee with Liverpool on 1 August 2000. He suffered many injuries during his spell at Liverpool and failed to make a Premier League appearance. However, he played in three League Cup ties for Liverpool, the first being an 8–0 demolition of Stoke City in November 2000. In his third and final League Cup appearance for Liverpool he came on as a substitute and scored a penalty in the shootout as Liverpool defeated Tottenham Hotspur.

On 20 March 2001, he was loaned to Bristol Rovers where he made six appearances and scored a goal against Wrexham. The loan deal lasted until 7 May.

While at Anfield, Partridge spent an entire season, from 27 September 2002 to 1 April 2003, on loan at Coventry City and was voted fans player of the season 2003–04. Partridge was released by Liverpool at the back of the 2004–05 season.

==== Sheffield Wednesday ====
Partridge signed for Sheffield Wednesday on a free transfer on 29 July 2005. However, on 4 May 2006, it was announced that, after failing to hit a consistent run of form, his contract would not be renewed upon expiry at the end of the season. He scored once for Wednesday, in a League Cup tie with Stockport County.

==== Rotherham United ====
He subsequently joined Rotherham on 30 June 2006 and played 36 times for the Millers in 2006–07. He was released at the end of the season.

==== Chester City ====
He subsequently signed for Chester on 21 June 2007 making his competitive club debut in a 0–0 draw with Chesterfield on 11 August 2007, with his first goal coming against Crewe Alexandra in the Football League Trophy the following month. In the following weeks he enhanced his reputation as a lively winger with an eye for goal, most notably after scoring two very well taken goals in Chester's 2–1 win at Stockport County on 20 October. However, he managed just two more goals during the rest of the season and struggled to establish a first–team starting place in the 2008–09 season, as Chester were relegated from the Football League.

==== Milton Keynes Dons ====
On 21 July 2009, Partridge joined Milton Keynes Dons on a one-year contract. Partridge then joined Kettering Town on loan alongside fellow MK Dons player Sol Davis on 26 November 2009. He scored his only goal for Kettering in a match against Luton Town and went on to make a total of 4 appearances for the club while on his loan spell.

==== Stockport County ====
On 18 January 2010 MK Dons announced that Partridge had been released and was to join Stockport County for the remaining six months of the season alongside fellow released player Danny Swailes. All four MK Dons players who had joined on 18 January, plus David Perkins who had joined from Colchester United on loan started the match on 19 January against Swindon Town. On 31 August 2010 it was announced by Stockport that an agreement had been made regarding early settlement of player's contract and as a result he had left the club.

==== The New Saints ====
In September 2010, Partridge joined Welsh Premier League side The New Saints. In his first six Welsh Premiership matches, he scored six times including a hat-trick on 10 October 2010 against Aberystwyth Town. After his impressive start to the season he was awarded the Welsh Premier's player of the month award for October 2010. In March 2011 he signed a contract extension keeping him with the club until June 2012. In August 2011 it was announced that he had been forced to retire after failing to recover from a persistent knee injury.

==== Airbus UK Broughton ====
In November 2012, Partridge came out of retirement and joined Welsh Premier League side Airbus. He made 15 appearances for the club – 10 as a substitute, scoring one goal.

=== International career ===
Partridge is a former Republic of Ireland Under-18 international where he was a member of the team that won the European Under–18 Football Championship in 1998 beating Germany 4–3 on penalties in the final in Cyprus. He scored for the side in the first group match against Croatia in a 5–2 win, and played in the third match and the final.

He was also capped as an Under-21 international. He was called up to the senior Irish international team in November 2002 whilst at Coventry City for a friendly match versus Greece but did not play.

== Physiotherapy career ==
He studied at the University of Salford for a degree in Physiotherapy and graduated in 2009 with a first class degree. Following the completion of his Physiotherapy degree, he became a director at a physiotherapy clinic in Chester He then studied for a 2-year part-time master's degree in Football Rehabilitation at Edge Hill University which he completed with a distinction.

Having been previously a member of physiotherapy staff for Liverpool F.C Academy where he oversaw the medical department from Under-9 to Under-16 level he then held a physiotherapist role for the club's Under 21 team, before in the summer of 2016 he moved to a similar post supporting the first team.

In January 2020 it was announced Partridge would be leaving Liverpool to take on a similar role with the Qatar national team.

== Personal life ==
Partridge, through his wife Lesley, is the brother-in-law of former Liverpool striker Michael Owen, and the son-in-law of Terry Owen.

== Honours ==
=== As physio ===
Liverpool FC

- UEFA Champions League: 2019
- FIFA Club World Cup: 2019
