= Robbie Foy =

Scottish footballer (born 1985)

Personal information
- Date of birth: 28 October 1985 (age 40)
- Place of birth: Edinburgh, Scotland
- Height: 5 ft 6 in (1.68 m)
- Position: Winger

Youth career
- 2000–2005: Liverpool

Senior career*
Years	Team	Apps	(Gls)
2002–2006	Liverpool	0	(0)
2005	→ Chester City (loan)	13	(0)
2005	→ Wrexham (loan)	17	(3)
2006–2007	Scunthorpe United	5	(0)
Total		35	(3)

International career
2004	Scotland U21	5	(0)
- * Club domestic league appearances and goals

Robbie Foy (born 28 October 1985 in Edinburgh) is a Scottish former footballer, who played as a winger.

== Career ==
Foy attended Oxgangs Primary School and Firrhill High School, and played for youth club Hutchison Vale, before making the move down south and signing for Liverpool in 2000. Foy came through the ranks at the Liverpool Academy and began training full-time at Melwood during the 2003–04 season. At this time he was selected for a Scotland under-20 team. He later played five times for the Scotland under-21 team.

Foy made his debut for the Liverpool first team during a pre-season game with Wrexham in July 2004, replacing Harry Kewell at half-time. He made a substitute appearance for the first team during the League Cup win over Tottenham Hotspur in the same season.

Foy finished the 2004–05 season at Chester City with a three-month loan spell, having been signed by Liverpool legend Ian Rush. This move allowed Foy to gain first-team experience, although he failed to find the net for the Blues, however he did help them avoid relegation.

In September 2005, Foy was sent out on loan to Wrexham. During a five-month spell at Wrexham, Foy scored three league goals in total. He made 12 appearances for Liverpool reserves during the 2005–06 season, scoring three goals. He was given a free transfer by Liverpool in May 2006.

Foy undertook a trial with SPL side Dunfermline Athletic during July 2006, but failed to gain a contract. At the end of July, Foy undertook a trial with Grimsby Town; he impressed during their final friendly match versus Leeds United, but yet again, financial circumstances stopped negotiations. He signed for Scunthorpe United in August 2006, but was released near the end of the 2006–07 season by new manager Nigel Adkins after struggling to command a place in the side in their League One championship season.
