= Patrice Luzi =

French footballer (born 1980)

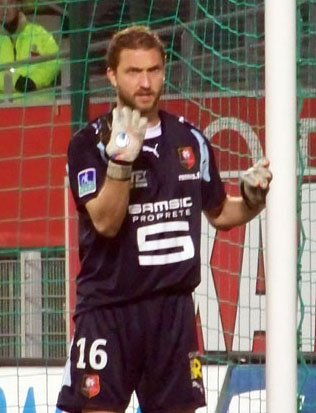
- Luzi with Rennes in 2008

Personal information
- Full name: Patrice René Jean Luzi-Bernardi
- Date of birth: 8 July 1980 (age 46)
- Place of birth: Ajaccio, France
- Height: 1.91 m (6 ft 3 in)
- Position: Goalkeeper

Youth career
- Monaco

Senior career*
Years	Team	Apps	(Gls)
1999–2001	Monaco	1	(0)
2001–2002	Ajaccio	1	(0)
2002–2005	Liverpool	1	(0)
2005–2006	Excelsior Mouscron	26	(0)
2006–2007	Charleroi	28	(0)
2007–2010	Rennes	25	(0)
Total		82	(0)
- * Club domestic league appearances and goals

Patrice René Jean Luzi-Bernardi (born 8 July 1980) is a French former professional footballer who played as a goalkeeper. The longest stay in his career was his three years with Liverpool, which came to an end when he was released by the Anfield club in June 2005. He then signed a contract with the Belgian side Excelsior Mouscron. In 2006, he moved from Mouscron to another Belgian club, Charleroi.

Having previously played for Monaco and Ajaccio, Luzi made his only appearance for Liverpool in January 2004 against Chelsea in a 1–0 win. His chances were limited when Liverpool brought in Southampton's Paul Jones on loan to cover Jerzy Dudek and Chris Kirkland.
