= 2004–05 Liverpool F.C. season =

English football club season

Liverpool
2004–05 season
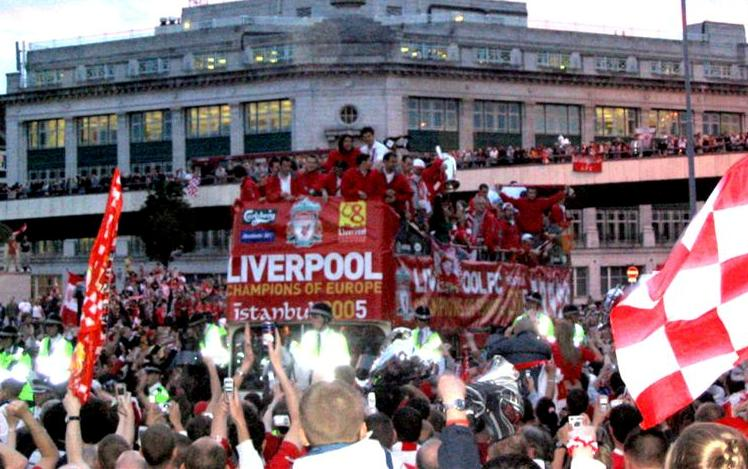
- Liverpool players during their UEFA Champions League victory parade, 2005
- Chairman: David Moores
- Manager: Rafael Benitez
- Stadium: Anfield
- Premier League: 5th
- FA Cup: Third round
- League Cup: Runners-up
- UEFA Champions League: Winners
- Top goalscorer: League: Milan Baroš (9); All: Milan Baroš; Luis García; Steven Gerrard (13 each)
- Average home league attendance: 42,586
Home colours	Away colours	Third colours

The 2004–05 season was Liverpool Football Club's 113th season in existence and their 43rd consecutive season in the top-flight of English football. The season began on 1 July 2004 and concluded on 30 June 2005, with competitive matches played between August and May. Liverpool finished in fifth place, 37 points behind eventual winners Chelsea with a record of 17 wins, 7 draws and 14 defeats. This was not an improvement on the previous Premier League season when they finished fourth. Liverpool fared better in cup competitions. Although they were eliminated by Burnley in the third round of the FA Cup, they reached the final of the League Cup, which they lost 3–2 to Chelsea. Despite their lack of success domestically, Liverpool were successful in the UEFA Champions League. They won the competition for the fifth time, defeating Italian team AC Milan in the final.

After six years in charge, Gérard Houllier was replaced as manager by Rafael Benítez, who had led Valencia to victory in La Liga and the UEFA Cup the previous season. Liverpool acquired eight players in the transfer market, including Djibril Cissé, Xabi Alonso and Luis García. They were supplemented by the arrival of Mauricio Pellegrino, Fernando Morientes and Scott Carson during the January transfer window. A total of four players departed including Markus Babbel, Danny Murphy and Michael Owen, who were all transferred in the summer transfer window. Stéphane Henchoz left the club during the winter transfer window.

Thirty-two different players represented the club in four competitions, and there were 17 different goalscorers. Liverpool's top goalscorers were Milan Baroš, Steven Gerrard and García with 13 goals each. Defender John Arne Riise made the most appearances during the season with 57.

== Background ==
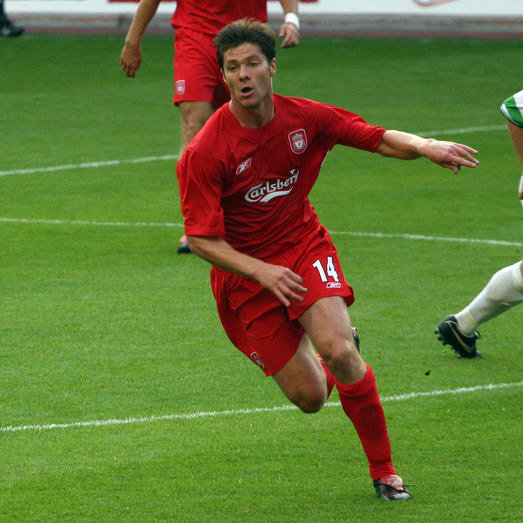
Xabi Alonso (pictured in July 2005) joined the club from Real Sociedad for £10.7 million.

Liverpool did not win any trophies in the 2003–04 season. The team finished fourth in the Premier League, securing a return to the UEFA Champions League, but finished 30 points behind eventual winners Arsenal. They fared little better in the cup competitions, exiting the FA Cup in the fifth round losing 1–0 to Portsmouth in a replay after the original tie finished 1–1. A 3–2 defeat to Bolton Wanderers resulted in Liverpool's exit from the League Cup in the fourth round. Liverpool reached the same round of the UEFA Cup before they were eliminated by Marseille 3–2 on aggregate.

Following the end of the season, manager Gérard Houllier was replaced by Rafael Benítez after six years in charge. It was felt that Houllier had taken the club as far as he could and that his reign had peaked in the 2000–01 season, when the club won the League Cup, FA Cup and UEFA Cup. Benítez had won La Liga and the UEFA Cup with Valencia during the 2003–04 season. The performance of Benítez's team against Liverpool during the 2002–03 UEFA Champions League, when Valencia won both games in the group stage, were important factors influencing the Liverpool board to appoint him as manager. Several new players were brought in as well as Benítez. A deal for striker Djibril Cissé was secured before Houllier left, while Benítez's first signing as manager was defender Josemi from Málaga. Antonio Núñez, who joined as part of Owen's transfer to Real Madrid, Xabi Alonso and Luis García were the remaining transfers made in the summer transfer window.

Liverpool's first match of the pre-season was against Wrexham at their home stadium, the Racecourse Ground. Two goals from Anthony Le Tallec secured a 2–1 victory. The remainder of their games were in the ChampionsWorld Series held in America. Liverpool beat Celtic 5–1 in the first game, lost 1–0 to Porto in the second and beat Roma 2–1 in the final game with Owen and Cissé scoring.

Several players left Liverpool during the season. Defender Markus Babbel joined VfB Stuttgart on a free transfer after his contract had expired. Midfielder Danny Murphy joined Charlton Athletic for £2.5 million. Forward Michael Owen joined Real Madrid for £8.5 million with Núñez moving to Liverpool after talks stalled on a new contract. Benítez stated he was happy for Owen to stay but contract issues made that difficult: "I was very happy with Michael and I wanted him to stay. The problem was he only had a year left on his contract."

Arsenal and Chelsea were considered the pre-season favourites, with Arsenal looking to retain their title after their unbeaten season in the 2003–04 Premier League. It was felt that Liverpool would push the top three teams with BBC Sport's Mark Lawrenson stating: "My immediate thoughts are that Liverpool will finish fourth, pushing to break into the top three."

=== Transfers ===
==== In ====
Players transferred in
No.	Position	Player	Transferred from	Fee	Date	Ref
9	FW	Djibril Cissé	Auxerre	£14,500,000	1 July 2004	
17	DF	Josemi	Málaga	£2,000,000	28 July 2004	
18	MF	Antonio Núñez	Real Madrid	£1,500,000	17 August 2004	
14	MF	Xabi Alonso	Real Sociedad	£10,700,000	20 August 2004	
10	MF	Luis García	Barcelona	£6,000,000	20 August 2004	
12	DF	Mauricio Pellegrino	Valencia	Free	5 January 2005	
19	FW	Fernando Morientes	Real Madrid	£6,300,000	13 January 2005	
20	GK	Scott Carson	Leeds United	£1,000,000	21 January 2005	

==== Out ====
Players transferred out
No.	Position	Player	Transferred to	Fee	Date	Ref
6	DF	Markus Babbel	VfB Stuttgart	Free	16 July 2004	
13	MF	Danny Murphy	Charlton Athletic	£2,500,000	10 August 2004	
10	FW	Michael Owen	Real Madrid	£8,000,000 + Antonio Núñez	14 August 2004	
2	DF	Stéphane Henchoz	Celtic	Free	28 January 2005	

==== Transfer summary ====
Summary of transfer activity during the season
Period	Spending	Income	Net expenditure
Summer	▼£34,700,000	▲£10,250,000	▼£24,450,000
Winter	▼£7,300,000	£0	▼£7,300,000
Total	▼£42,000,000	▲£10,250,000	▼£31,750,000

=== Pre-season matches ===
2004–05 Pre-season matches
Date	Opponents	Venue	Result	Score	Scorers	Attendance
21 July 2004	Wrexham	A	W	2–1	Le Tallec (2) 24', 78'	14,978
27 July 2004	Celtic	N	W	5–1	Riise 5', Owen 36', Cissé (2) 62', 76', Henchoz 69'	24,271
31 July 2004	Porto	N	L	0–1		40,078
3 August 2004	Roma	N	W	2–1	Cissé 30', Owen 85'	25,028

== Competitions ==
=== Overall record ===
Competition	First match	Last match	Starting round	Final position	Record							
Competition	First match	Last match	Starting round	Final position	Pld	W	D	L	GF	GA	GD	Win %
Premier League	14 August 2004	15 May 2005	Matchday 1	5th	38	17	7	14	52	41	+11	44.74
FA Cup	18 January 2005		Third round	Third round	1	0	0	1	0	1	−1	0.00
League Cup	26 October 2004	27 February 2005	Third round	Runners-up	6	4	1	1	10	4	+6	66.67
UEFA Champions League	10 August 2004	25 May 2005	Third qualifying round	Winners	15	8	4	3	20	10	+10	53.33
Total					60	29	12	19	82	56	+26	48.33

Source: Soccerway

=== Premier League ===
A total of 20 teams competed in the Premier League in the 2004–05 season. Each team played 38 matches; two against every other team and one match at each club's stadium. Three points were awarded for each win, one point per draw, and none for defeats. At the end of the season the top two teams qualified for the group stages of the UEFA Champions League; teams in third and fourth needed to play a qualifier. The provisional fixture list was released on 24 June 2004, but was subject to change in the event of clashes with other competitions, international football, inclement weather, or matches being selected for television coverage.

==== August–October ====
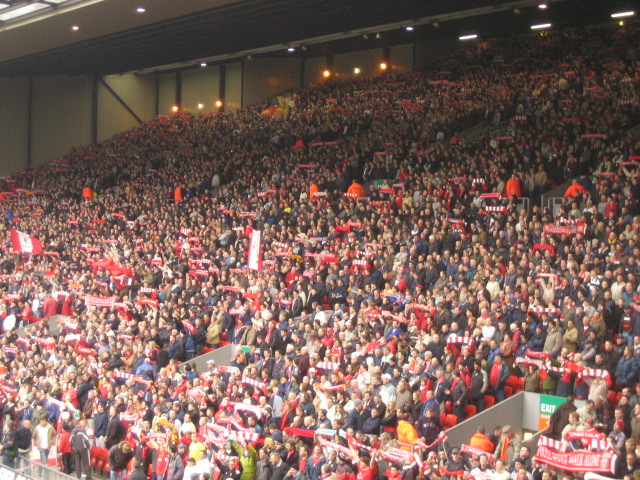
Liverpool supporters during a match at Anfield in the season

Liverpool travelled to Tottenham Hotspur on the opening weekend of the season. Djibril Cissé scored on his league debut to give Liverpool the lead in the first half but an equaliser from Jermain Defoe in the second half meant the match finished 1–1. The following weekend, Liverpool hosted Manchester City at Anfield. City took the lead at the end of the first half when former Liverpool striker, Nicolas Anelka scored. However, a goal three minutes into the second half from Milan Baroš and another from Steven Gerrard in the 75th minute meant Liverpool won the match 2–1. A trip to the Reebok Stadium to face Bolton Wanderers was next for Liverpool. Luis García, making his debut, had a goal disallowed for offside before Kevin Davies 38th-minute goal secured a 1–0 win for Bolton. Due to international fixtures, Liverpool did not play another game for two weeks. When domestic football resumed, Liverpool faced West Bromwich at Anfield in their next match. Goals from Gerrard, Steve Finnan and García helped Liverpool to a 3–0 win. Manager Rafael Benítez was encouraged by his side's performance: "It was perhaps the best performance so far because we scored three goals and had many possibilities, I'm a little closer to finding the balance, but I need more time. I cannot say how long, it's impossible to know, what we've seen is a better team. It's a small step, we need to do more."

Liverpool's following match was against rivals Manchester United at their home ground, Old Trafford. Mikaël Silvestre opened the scoring for United in the 20th minute but an own goal by defender John O'Shea levelled the score 14 minutes later. Captain Gerrard went off with an injury after 40 minutes and Liverpool struggled to create more chances, and a further goal from Silvestre delivered a 2–1 win for United. A home match against Norwich City was next for Liverpool. Goals from Baroš, García and Cissé resulted in a 3–0 win. Liverpool's subsequent match was away to Chelsea at their home ground, Stamford Bridge. A tight game was settled by a goal from Joe Cole in the 64th minute to give Chelsea a 1–0 victory. Liverpool travelled to Craven Cottage to face Fulham in their subsequent match. They were 2–0 down at halftime due to two goals from Luís Boa Morte, but an own goal by Zat Knight and goals from Baroš, Xabi Alonso and Igor Bišćan secured a 4–2 victory for Liverpool.

Goals from John Arne Riise and García were enough to secure a 2–0 win in the following match against Charlton Athletic at Anfield, which moved Liverpool up to fifth place. Liverpool's next opposition were Blackburn Rovers. They took the lead in the seventh minute when Riise scored, but Jay Bothroyd scored in the 16th minute to level the scores. Liverpool suffered a setback in the 30th minute when Cissé was forced off with a broken leg after a challenge with Jay McEveley. Blackburn took the lead on the stroke of halftime when Brett Emerton scored after the Liverpool defence failed to clear the ball, but Liverpool levelled the scores in the 54th minute when Baroš scored from a pass by García. Benítez was disappointed his side did not win the match: "I'm disappointed as we began the game with a high tempo like we did at the start of the second half."

==== November–December ====
The following weekend, Liverpool faced Birmingham City at Anfield. Liverpool had the majority of the chances but failed to score and a Darren Anderton goal for Birmingham in the 77th minute gave them a 1–0 win. Liverpool rebounded the following week as they beat Crystal Palace 3–2, courtesy of a hat-trick by Baroš, which included a last-minute penalty. Middlesbrough were the opponents the next weekend. A first-half goal from Chris Riggott and a goal in the second-half from Boudewijn Zenden resulted in a 2–0 defeat for Liverpool. Liverpool faced defending champions Arsenal at Anfield the following weekend. They took the lead in the 37th minute when Alonso scored. Arsenal equalised in the 57th minute through a goal by Patrick Vieira, but with the match heading for a draw, a goal by Neil Mellor from 25 yards (23 m) secured a 2–1 victory for Liverpool. Benítez was delighted with the result and hailed his team's performance: "We worked very hard against a very good team and it's fantastic, I think we were almost perfect in the first half—with and without the ball. In the second half, we were a little tired and they played very well. We knew it would be difficult not to concede a goal but at the end of the game, I think it was a fair result."

Liverpool faced Aston Villa next at their home ground, Villa Park. A Harry Kewell goal in the 16th minute gave Liverpool the lead but Nolberto Solano scored just before half-time to level the scores, and with no further goals, the match finished 1–1. Local rivals Everton were the opposition the following weekend at their home ground, Goodison Park in the 200th Merseyside derby. A goal from Lee Carsley in the 68th minute earned victory for Everton. Benítez was disappointed with the result and bemoaned the finishing of his side: "This has been a bad end to a fine week for us. It has taken the shine off the win over Olympiakos, I felt we had enough chances to be ahead at the break, but in tight games like this you have to score them. They scored and we didn't—that was the difference. We're thinking about this game—and need to learn from it." Liverpool faced Portsmouth three days later at Anfield. Benítez made six changes to the starting lineup from the defeat against Everton and with a Gerrard free-kick giving Liverpool the lead in the 70th minute, his changes looked to have worked. However, a goal from Lomana LuaLua in injury time after goalkeeper Jerzy Dudek misjudged a cross, meant the match finished 1–1.

Newcastle United were the opposition in the subsequent match held at Anfield. They took the lead in the 32nd minute when Patrick Kluivert scored. But an own goal by Titus Bramble and goals from Mellor and Baroš secured a 3–1 victory for Liverpool. Liverpool travelled to The Hawthorns on Boxing Day to face West Bromwich Albion. Riise opened the scoring in the 17th minute, and West Bromwich were reduced to ten men when Cosmin Contra was sent off for handling a shot by Antonio Nuñez. Liverpool were awarded a penalty following Contra's handball, but Baroš's penalty was saved. Liverpool scored a further four goals in the second half, courtesy of Florent Sinama Pongolle, Gerrard, Riise and García, to secure a 5–0 win. A goal from Sinama Pongolle secured a 1–0 victory two days later at Anfield against Southampton. Benítez was happy with the win but wanted to play with more authority: "It was hard work. We controlled the game in the first half but in the second half it is difficult. In the end it was important to win three games in a row. We had some chances at the end of the game and the goalkeeper made some good saves, perhaps we need more confidence when we are up 1–0 ahead."

==== January–February ====
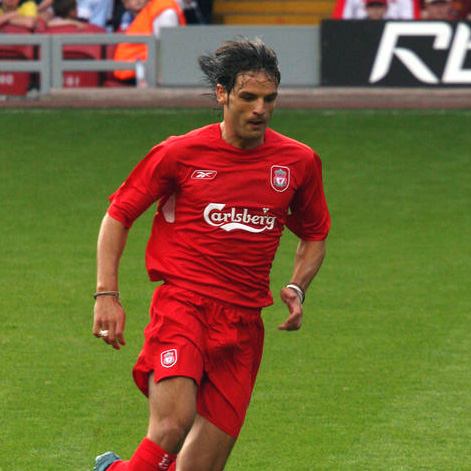
Fernando Morientes (pictured in August 2005) joined Liverpool during the January transfer window.

Liverpool signed a further three players in the January transfer window with defender Mauricio Pellegrino, striker Fernando Morientes and goalkeeper Scott Carson joining the club. While Defender Stéphane Henchoz was sold to Celtic. On 1 January 2005, Liverpool faced Chelsea at Anfield. A close match saw Liverpool denied a penalty in the first half when Tiago handled the ball before Joe Cole scored in the 80th minute to give Chelsea a 1–0 victory. Liverpool midfielder Alonso suffered a broken leg after a challenge with Frank Lampard that meant he would be out for three months. Two days later, Liverpool faced Norwich at Carrow Road. Goals from García and Riise before a late Norwich goal courtesy of Ryan Jarvis were enough to secure a 2–1 victory and move Liverpool up to fifth place. Liverpool's next opponents were rivals Manchester United. The match marked the debut of recent signing Fernando Morientes but he could not influence proceedings as United won 1–0. Despite being reduced to ten men when Wes Brown was sent off for a second bookable offence in the 64th minute, United won 1–0 thanks to a Wayne Rooney goal from 25 yards (23 m) which slipped past Dudek. Liverpool suffered another defeat in their next match against Southampton. Goals from David Prutton and Peter Crouch secured a 2–0 for the home side at St Mary's Stadium. Benítez bemoaned the two early goals his side conceded in an interview after the match: "If you concede two goals early, it's never easy to get back. We conceded too soon and they tried to play the long ball. We needed to go forward more. We had chances but it's difficult when you're losing and time's against you."

Liverpool travelled to The Valley for their following match against Charlton. They went behind in the 20th minute when Shaun Bartlett scored but goals in the second half from Morientes and Riise scored a 2–1 victory. Fulham were Liverpool's next opponents at Anfield. Morientes gave Liverpool the lead in the eighth minute but an Andy Cole goal eight minutes later levelled the scores at 1–1. Two goals in the second half courtesy of Sami Hyypiä and Baroš gave Liverpool a 3–1 victory. Liverpool went into their next match against Birmingham City at St Andrew's looking to win to the close the gap to Everton in fourth place to two points. However, they were unable to do so as they lost 2–0.

==== March–May ====
Newcastle were the next opposition as Liverpool travelled to St James' Park. Liverpool went into the match without Morientes, Djimi Traore, Kewell and Hamann and were "injury hit" according to BBC Sport. They were unable to score and a Laurent Robert goal in the 70th minute secured victory for Newcastle. Liverpool faced Blackburn Rovers in their next match at Anfield and were looking for a win to keep their hopes of finishing in the top four and securing a place in the Champions League alive. However, they were unable to defeat Blackburn with the match finishing 0–0 and the gap to Everton in fourth place was seven points. The next match was against Everton at Anfield and a win would see Liverpool reduce the gap to their rivals to four points with eight games left. Liverpool took the lead in the 27th minute from a free-kick 20 yards (18 m) from goal. García doubled the lead five minutes after a Morientes shot was pushed onto the crossbar by Everton goalkeeper Nigel Martyn and fell to him. Baroš was sent off for a high tackle on Alan Stubbs in the 77th minute, and despite a goal from Tim Cahill five minutes later, Liverpool held on to win 2–1. Benítez was pleased with the win but was concerned about the injuries his side were suffering from as Stephen Warnock, Hamann and Morientes all picked up injuries during the match: "We need to see how the injuries settle down now, maybe they will all be out for two or three weeks. It's hard to say at this stage but clearly we have a lot of problems at the moment. I am so proud of the players for the way they coped with the situation. It was a very difficult game and this is such a good win for us. We played with a high tempo in the first half and definitely deserved our victory."

Liverpool's following match was against Bolton at Anfield. A goal from Bišćan clinched a 1–0 victory which moved them to within a point of Everton in fourth place. A week later, Liverpool travelled to the City of Manchester Stadium to face Manchester City. A win would have taken Liverpool to fourth place but they conceded a goal in the 90th minute when Kiki Musampa scored from the edge of the penalty area to give City a 1–0 win. Benítez was disappointed with the result and felt a draw would have been a good result: "I am very disappointed. Sometimes when you cannot win a draw is a good result. We were in the last minute, we had a throw-in, then we give the ball away. They counter and we lose a goal. If we play to the level we can, we can make fourth but it will be difficult if we do not improve our mental attitude." A 2–2 draw in their next match against Tottenham at Anfield meant Liverpool were three points behind Everton in fourth place who also had a game in hand. Portsmouth were the opposition in Liverpool's next match at Fratton Park. Morientes scored in the fourth minute to give Liverpool the lead. Portsmouth equalised in the 34th minute when Diomansy Kamara scored after a header by Arjan de Zeeuw was blocked by Finnan. Liverpool restored their lead in the 45th minute with García heading in from Riise's cross, which was enough to secure a 2–1 victory.

Liverpool faced Crystal Palace in their subsequent match at Selhurst Park, which ended in disappointment as a 1–0 defeat meant they were four points behind Everton in fourth place. With three games left, Middlesbrough were the next opponents for Liverpool at Anfield. The match started poorly for Liverpool as they conceded within the first four minutes when Szilárd Németh scored. Liverpool equalised in the 52nd minute when Gerrard scored from 35 yards (32 m) from Middlesbrough's goal, but they were unable to find a second goal. The result meant Liverpool were three points behind Everton in fourth place after they lost 2–0 to Fulham. A 3–1 defeat to Arsenal a week later at Highbury meant that Liverpool were unable to finish in fourth place above rivals Everton. Aston Villa were the opponents for Liverpool's final game of the season at Anfield. Two goals from Cisse secured a 2–1 victory which meant Liverpool finished the season in fifth place with 58 points, three points behind rivals Everton.

==== League table ====
Pos	Team	Pld	W	D	L	GF	GA	GD	Pts	Qualification or relegation
3	Manchester United	38	22	11	5	58	26	+32	77	Qualification for the Champions League third qualifying round
4	Everton	38	18	7	13	45	46	−1	61	Qualification for the Champions League third qualifying round
5	Liverpool	38	17	7	14	52	41	+11	58	Qualification for the Champions League first qualifying round (Note: Although they failed to qualify for the Champions League as one of the top four English clubs, Liverpool were given a special dispensation to compete as the defending champions. They were, however, forced to enter in the first qualifying round.)
6	Bolton Wanderers	38	16	10	12	49	44	+5	58	Qualification for the UEFA Cup first round (Note: Since the finalists of the FA Cup, Arsenal and Manchester United, as well as Chelsea, who won the 2004–05 Football League Cup, were qualified for the Champions League, and the fifth-placed team (Liverpool) were moved to the Champions League, the sixth and seventh-placed teams in the Premier League were rewarded entry to the UEFA Cup.)
7	Middlesbrough	38	14	13	11	53	46	+7	55	Qualification for the UEFA Cup first round

Rules for classification: 1) points; 2) goal difference; 3) number of goals scored.

==== Results summary ====
Overall								Home						Away					
Pld	W	D	L	GF	GA	GD	Pts	W	D	L	GF	GA	GD	W	D	L	GF	GA	GD
38	17	7	14	52	41	+11	58	12	4	3	31	15	+16	5	3	11	21	26	−5

==== Matches ====
2004–05 Premier League matches
Date	Opponents	Venue	Result	Score	Scorers	Attendance	Position	Ref
14 August 2004	Tottenham Hotspur	A	D	1–1	Cissé 38'	35,105	7	
21 August 2004	Manchester City	H	W	2–1	Baroš 48', Gerrard 75'	42,831	5	
29 August 2004	Bolton Wanderers	A	L	0–1		27,880	5	
11 September 2004	West Bromwich Albion	H	W	3–0	Gerrard 16', Finnan 42', García 60'	42,947	10	
20 September 2004	Manchester United	A	L	1–2	O'Shea 34' o.g.	67,857	7	
24 September 2004	Norwich City	H	W	3–0	Baroš 23', García 26', Cissé 64'	43,152	9	
3 October 2004	Chelsea	A	L	0–1		42,028	6	
16 October 2004	Fulham	A	W	4–2	Knight 50' o.g., Baroš 71', Alonso 79', Bišćan 90'	21,884	8	
23 October 2004	Charlton Athletic	H	W	2–0	Riise 52', García 74'	41,625	5	
30 October 2004	Blackburn Rovers	A	D	2–2	Riise 7', Baroš 54'	21,884	5	
6 November 2004	Birmingham City	H	L	0–1		42,669	5	
13 November 2004	Crystal Palace	H	W	3–2	Baroš 23' (pen.), 45', 90' (pen.)	42,862	6	
20 November 2004	Middlesbrough	A	L	0–2		34,751	6	
28 November 2004	Arsenal	H	W	2–1	Alonso 37', Mellor 90+2'	43,730	8	
4 December 2004	Aston Villa	A	D	1–1	Kewell 16'	42,593	6	
11 December 2004	Everton	A	L	0–1		40,552	6	
14 December 2004	Portsmouth	H	D	1–1	Gerrard 70'	35,064	6	
19 December 2004	Newcastle United	H	W	3–1	Bramble 35' o.g., Mellor 38', Baroš 61'	43,856	6	
26 December 2004	West Bromwich Albion	A	W	5–0	Riise 17', 82', Sinama Pongolle 51', Gerrard 55', García 89'	27,533	6	
28 December 2004	Southampton	H	W	1–0	Sinama Pongolle 44'	42,382	6	
1 January 2005	Chelsea	H	L	0–1		43,886	6	
3 January 2005	Norwich City	A	W	2–1	García 58', Riise 66'	24,503	5	
15 January 2005	Manchester United	H	L	0–1		44,183	5	
22 January 2005	Southampton	A	L	0–2		32,017	5	
1 February 2005	Charlton Athletic	A	W	2–1	Morientes 61', Riise 79'	27,102	5	
5 February 2005	Fulham	H	W	3–1	Morientes 8', Hyypiä 63', Baroš 77'	43,534	5	
12 February 2005	Birmingham City	A	L	0–2		29,318	5	
5 March 2005	Newcastle United	A	L	0–1		52,323	5	
16 March 2005	Blackburn Rovers	A	D	0–0		37,765	5	
20 March 2005	Everton	H	W	2–1	Gerrard 27', García 32'	44,224	5	
2 April 2005	Bolton Wanderers	H	W	1–0	Bišćan 82'	43,755	5	
9 April 2005	Manchester City	A	L	0–1		47,303	5	
16 April 2005	Tottenham Hotspur	H	D	2–2	García 44', Hyypiä 63'	44,029	5	
20 April 2005	Portsmouth	A	W	2–1	Morientes 4', García 45'	20,205	5	
23 April 2005	Crystal Palace	A	L	0–1		26,043	5	
30 April 2005	Middlesbrough	H	D	1–1	Gerrard 52'	43,250	5	
8 May 2005	Arsenal	A	L	1–3	Gerrard 51'	38,119	5	
15 May 2005	Aston Villa	H	W	2–1	Cissé 20' (pen.), 27'	43,406	5	

=== FA Cup ===
Liverpool entered the competition in the third round, as a result of their Premier League status. Their opponents in the third round were Burnley. The match was played at Burnley's home ground, Turf Moor, with Liverpool resting several regular first-team players and opting to field "a collection of reserve and youth team players" according to The Guardian. The decision was unsuccessful. Burnley won the match 1–0 due to an own goal by defender Djimi Traoré in the second half.

==== Matches ====
2004–05 FA Cup matches
Round	Date	Opponents	Venue	Result	Score	Scorers	Attendance	Ref
Third round	18 January 2005	Burnley	A	L	0–1		19,033	

=== League Cup ===
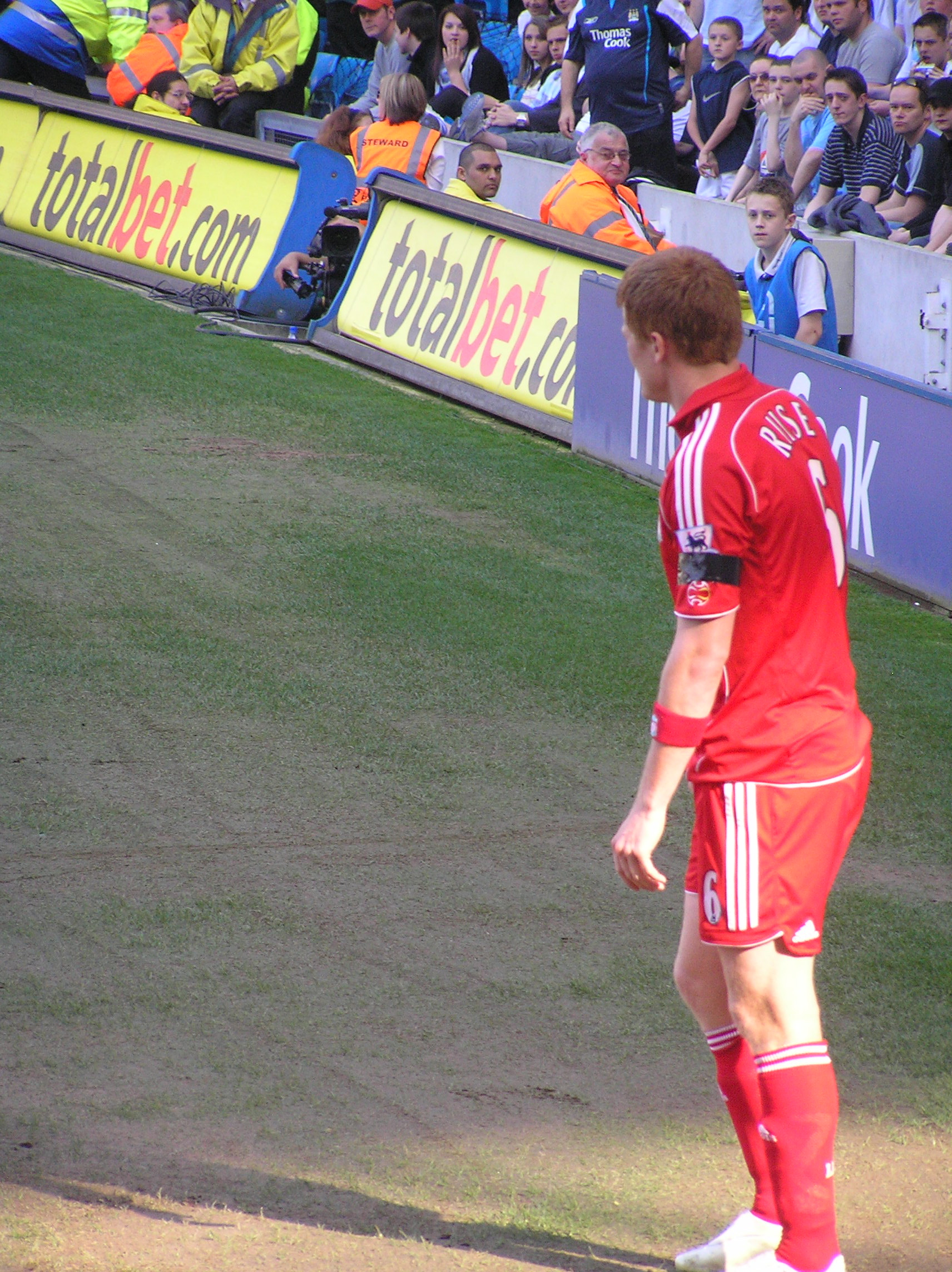
John Arne Riise scored the opening goal in the Football League Cup final, which Liverpool lost 3–2.

Liverpool entered the League Cup in the third round due to them qualifying for European competition. Their opponents were Millwall. A "second-string Liverpool", according to BBC Sport, won 3–0 courtesy of a goal from Salif Diao in the first half and two from Milan Baroš in the second. They were drawn against fellow Premier League team Middlesbrough in the fourth round. Two goals from Neil Mellor secured a 2–0 win for Liverpool to progress to the quarter-finals. Benítez opted to field a reserve side again against Tottenham Hotspur, in a match which went to extra time after a goalless first 90 minutes. Tottenham opened the scoring in the 108th minute when Jermain Defoe scored from a Frederic Kanoute cross. Three minutes before the end, Liverpool were awarded a penalty kick after Kanoute handled the ball in the Tottenham penalty area. Florent Sinama-Pongolle scored from the penalty spot to level the match at 1–1 and set up a penalty shoot-out, which Liverpool won 4–3.

Liverpool were drawn against Championship side Watford in the semi-finals. Played over two-legs, Liverpool won the first leg at Anfield 1–0 after Gerrard scored in the 56th minute. The second leg at Watford's home ground, Vicarage Road, was "a game of few chances" according to BBC Sport. A goal from Gerrard in the 77th minute secured a 1–0 victory, and a 2–0 win on aggregate to secure Liverpool's place in the final. Liverpool faced Chelsea in the final, which Benítez felt would favour Liverpool: "There will be more pressure on them, they have spent a lot of money and are the best team in the league, because they are in first position, but they've lost their last two important games. That means they will be under pressure. People will see them as the favourites, I'm sure, so the pressure is on them and not us."

The final was held at the Millennium Stadium in Cardiff. Liverpool took the lead within a minute of the kick-off. A cross from Fernando Morientes was met by John Arne Riise, who volleyed the ball past Petr Čech in the Chelsea goal. It was the fastest goal scored in a League Cup final. The score remained 1–0 until the 79th minute when Gerrard scored an own goal, after he headed a Chelsea free-kick into his own goal. The match finished 1–1 after 90 minutes and went to extra-time. Chelsea took the lead in the 97th minute when Didier Drogba scored and they extended their lead further six minutes later following a Mateja Kežman goal. Liverpool scored through Antonio Núñez a minute later, but they were unable to score another goal and Chelsea won the match 3–2 to win the League Cup.

==== Matches ====
2004–05 League Cup matches
Round	Date	Opponents	Venue	Result	Score	Scorers	Attendance	Ref
Third round	26 October 2004	Millwall	A	W	3–0	Diao 18', Baroš 70', 80'	17,655	
Fourth round	10 November 2004	Middlesbrough	H	W	2–0	Mellor 83', 89'	28,176	
Quarter-final	1 December 2004	Tottenham Hotspur	A	W	1–1; 4–3 (pen.)	Sinama Pongolle 117' pen.	46,100	
Semi-final	11 January 2005	Watford	H	W	1–0	Gerrard 56'	35,739	
Semi-final	25 January 2005	Watford	A	W	1–0	Gerrard 77'	19,797	
Final	27 February 2005	Chelsea	N	L	2–3 (a.e.t.)	Riise 1', Núñez 113'	78,000	

=== UEFA Champions League ===
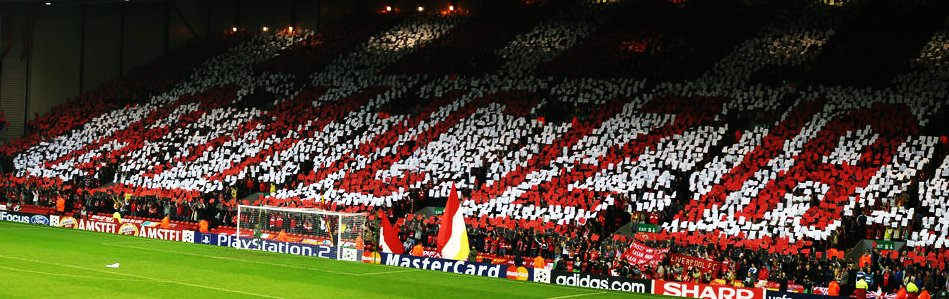
Fans in the Kop hold a mosaic during the match with Juventus. Amicizia means "friendship" in Italian.

As Liverpool had finished fourth in the league the previous season, they needed to play in the qualifying round against Grazer AK to reach the group stages. Liverpool won the first leg 2–0 courtesy of two goals from Gerrard. They lost the second leg 1–0 at Anfield, a Mario Tokić goal securing victory for Grazer, but they progressed 2–1 on aggregate. Liverpool were drawn in Group A along with Deportivo La Coruña, Monaco and Olympiacos.

Liverpool won their first match against Monaco at Anfield 2–0, courtesy of goals from Cissé and Baroš. A 1–0 loss against Olympiacos at the Karaiskakis Stadium followed and this was the first time Liverpool had lost to Greek opposition. Deportivo La Coruña were the opposition in Liverpool's third group game at Anfield. The match ended 0–0 with Liverpool dominating the game and lacking a 'cutting edge' according to BBC Sport. Liverpool won the reverse fixture at the Estadio Riazor 1–0 thanks to an own goal by Deportivo defender Jorge Andrade. A 1–0 defeat to Monaco at the Stade Louis II meant Liverpool needed to win their final match against Olympiacos at Anfield by two clear goals to progress to the knockout stages. Liverpool started the game well but went behind to a free-kick from Rivaldo. This meant they needed to score three goals to progress to the next round. Sinama-Pongolle levelled the scores in the 47th minute after coming on as a substitute at half-time. Mellor scored a second in the 81st minute to put Liverpool ahead. In the 86th minute, Gerrard's "stunning half-volley, speared majestically from the edge of the area," according to The Guardian to earn a 3–1 victory and Liverpool's place in the round of 16. Gerrard was delighted with the result after it looked like Liverpool might exit the competition after falling a goal behind in the first half: "I'd be a liar if I didn't say I thought we were down and out at the break. They were spoiling the game and were strong defensively, so there was a mountain to climb at half-time."

Liverpool were drawn against Bayer Leverkusen of Germany in the round of 16. Liverpool took the lead in the first leg at Anfield when García scored in the 15th minute. Riise scored from a free-kick in the 35th minute to make it 2–0 and Hamman added a third in the second half. An error in the last minute by goalkeeper Jerzy Dudek saw França score for Leverkusen to make the score 3–1 at full-time. The second leg at Leverkusen's home ground, the BayArena finished with the same scoreline. Two goals in quick succession in the first half by García, were followed by a goal from Baroš in the second half. Jacek Krzynówek scored late in the match, but Liverpool's 3–1 victory meant they won 6–2 on aggregate to progress to the quarter-finals. Liverpool were drawn against Juventus. This was the first time the clubs had met since the Heysel Stadium disaster at the 1985 European Cup Final, where 39 people, many of them Juventus supporters, died. Liverpool took the lead in the first leg at Anfield in the tenth minute when Sami Hyypiä scored and García added a second fifteen minutes later. Juventus replied in the second half, when Liverpool goalkeeper Scott Carson allowed a Fabio Cannavaro header to slip through his fingers. But they were unable to score a second goal and the match finished 2–1. Benítez was pleased with the result and optimistic about their prospects in the second leg: "I was delighted with the first half, unfortunately the first half and second half were very different. They pressed us back after the break and made it difficult for us to keep the ball. The blow was conceding a goal in the second half." Gerrard was adamant Liverpool would not play for a draw in the second leg: "I'm sure Scott will be disappointed with it but to be fair to him he stopped one in the first half and it was one of the best saves I've seen all season. It means we've got to keep a clean sheet over there, but we won't play for a 0–0 in the second leg. We've got the ability to nick a goal so that will be our game plan and if we keep a clean sheet we're into the last four." Liverpool progressed to the semi-finals after a 0–0 draw in a game of few chances at Juventus' home ground, the Stadio Delle Alpi.

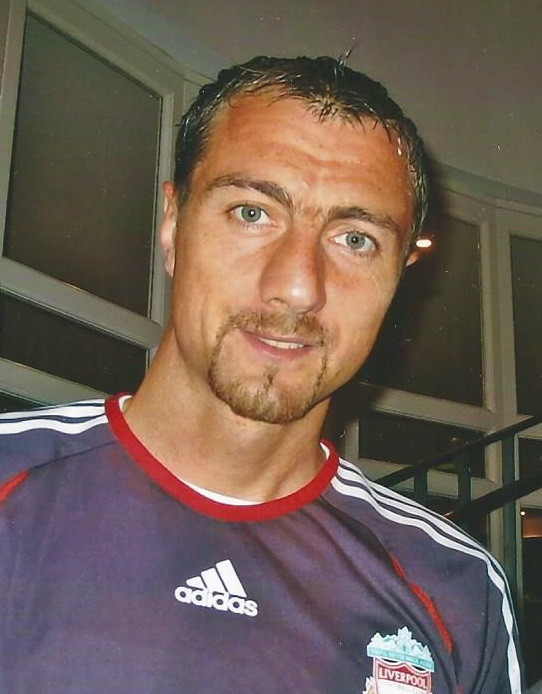
Liverpool goalkeeper Jerzy Dudek (pictured in 2006), whose save from Shevchenko in the penalty-shootout secured a fifth European Cup victory for Liverpool

Liverpool faced Chelsea in the semi-finals, who were the favourites as they had already beaten Liverpool three times during the season. The first leg was a close match with both sides close to scoring in the early stages. Riise and Baroš missed chances for Liverpool, while Didier Drogba and Frank Lampard had chances to put Chelsea in the lead too. The second half was a 'sterile affair' according to BBC Sport with neither side able to score as the match finished 0–0. Despite failing to score an away goal, Benítez was confident Liverpool would progress following the second leg at Anfield: "It is a good situation. We have very good supporters, they will be with us at Anfield and we need to win, we always have confidence and we need to believe in ourselves. We played a good game. The team worked hard and controlled the game, they had chances but a draw is a good result." Liverpool took the lead within the first four minutes at Anfield, when Baroš beat Chelsea goalkeeper Petr Čech to the ball and García tapped the ball into Chelsea goal, despite the protestations of Chelsea players who claimed the ball had not gone over the line. For the remainder of the match, Liverpool withstood Chelsea's attacks, whose best chance came in the final minute when Eiður Guðjohnsen's volley went just wide of the Liverpool goal. A 1–0 victory meant Liverpool progressed to their first European Cup final since 1985. Chelsea manager José Mourinho was critical of the officials following over the Liverpool goal: "The linesman scored the goal. No one knows if that shot went over the line and you must be 100%, but they are in the final and from my heart I hope they win it. The night belongs to them and I don't want to criticise them." Goalscorer García was adamant the ball was over the line when he scored and was delighted to have reached a final in his first season at the club: "I hooked the ball towards the goal, I felt it went in and I am very happy now. When I arrived here last summer I was intent on winning some trophies, but I did not expect to get to the Champions League final in my first season in England. For us to get to the final is beyond all our dreams, and for me to score the goal is a special moment too."

Liverpool faced Milan in the final at the Atatürk Olympic Stadium in Istanbul, Turkey. Milan were considered to be the favourites and took the lead in the first minute when Paolo Maldini scored. Milan added two more goals towards the end of the first half through Hernán Crespo to take a 3–0 lead into half-time. Liverpool reduced the deficit in the 53rd minute when Gerrard headed in a cross from Riise. They scored a further goal two minutes later when Vladimír Šmicer scored, and equalised to make it 3–3 when Alonso scored from a rebound after his penalty was saved following a foul on Gerrard. No further goals were scored and the match went into extra time. The extra 30 minutes were cagey with Milan having the best chance to win the match with three minutes left when Andriy Shevchenko had a shot saved by Dudek, who then saved the rebound at point-blank range. With no further goals, the match went to a penalty shoot-out. Milan missed their first two penalties, while Liverpool scored theirs to give them a 2–0 lead. Liverpool missed their next penalty by Riise and Milan scored twice to level the scores at 2–2, but Šmicer scored his penalty to give Liverpool a 3–2 lead. Milan needed to score their next penalty to remain the match but Dudek saved from Shevchenko to secure victory for Liverpool and their fifth European Cup triumph.

==== Group A ====
Group A
Pos	Team	Pld	W	D	L	GF	GA	GD	Pts	Qualification
1	(France) Monaco	6	4	0	2	10	4	+6	12	Advance to knockout stage
2	(England) Liverpool	6	3	1	2	6	3	+3	10	Advance to knockout stage
3	(Greece) Olympiacos	6	3	1	2	5	5	0	10	Transfer to UEFA Cup
4	(Spain) Deportivo La Coruña	6	0	2	4	0	9	−9	2	

==== Matches ====
2004–05 UEFA Champions League matches
Round	Date	Opponents	Venue	Result	Score	Scorers	Attendance	Ref
Third qualifying round	10 August 2004	Grazer AK	A	W	2–0	Gerrard 23', 79'	15,000	
Third qualifying round	24 August 2004	Grazer AK	H	L	0–1		42,590	
Group stage	15 September 2004	Monaco	H	W	2–0	Cissé 22', Baroš 84'	33,517	
Group stage	28 September 2004	Olympiacos	A	L	0–1		33,000	
Group stage	19 October 2004	Deportivo La Coruña	H	D	0–0		40,236	
Group stage	3 November 2004	Deportivo La Coruña	A	W	1–0	Andrade 14' o.g.	32,000	
Group stage	23 November 2004	Monaco	A	L	0–1		15,000	
Group stage	8 December 2004	Olympiacos	H	W	3–1	Sinama Pongolle 47', Mellor 81', Gerrard 86'	42,045	
Round of 16	22 February 2005	Bayer Leverkusen	H	W	3–1	García 15', Riise 35', Hamann 90'	40,942	
Round of 16	9 March 2005	Bayer Leverkusen	A	W	3–1	García 28', 32', Baroš 67'	23,000	
Quarter final	5 April 2005	Juventus	H	W	2–1	Hyypiä 10', García 25'	41,216	
Quarter final	13 April 2005	Juventus	A	D	0–0		50,000	
Semi final	27 April 2005	Chelsea	A	D	0–0		40,497	
Semi final	3 May 2005	Chelsea	H	W	1–0	García 4'	42,529	
Final	25 May 2005	Milan	N	D	3–3 (a.e.t.); 3–2 (pen.)	Gerrard 54', Šmicer, 56', Alonso 60'	65,000	

== Squad statistics ==
Liverpool used a total of 32 players during the season, with 17 different goalscorers. There were also five squad members who did not make an appearance during the season. Riise featured in 57 matches, the most of any Liverpool player during the campaign. Carragher was the only player to appear in every Premier League match. Baroš, Gerrard and García were topscorers with 13 goals each.

Key

No. = Squad number

Pos = Playing position

Nat. = Nationality

Apps = Appearances

GK = Goalkeeper

DF = Defender

MF = Midfielder

FW = Forward

= Yellow cards

= Red cards

Numbers in parentheses denote appearances as substitute. Players marked † left the club during the playing season.

Squad statistics
No.	Pos.	Nat.	Name	Premier League		FA Cup		League Cup		Champions League		Total		Discipline	
No.	Pos.	Nat.	Name	Apps	Goals	Apps	Goals	Apps	Goals	Apps	Goals	Apps	Goals	A yellow rectangular card	A red rectangular card
1	GK	POL	Jerzy Dudek	24	0	1	0	6	0	10	0	41	0	1	0
2	DF	SUI	Stéphane Henchoz†	0	0	0	0	3	0	1	0	4	0	0	0
3	DF	IRL	Steve Finnan	29 (4)	1	0	0	4 (1)	0	12 (2)	0	52	1	5	0
4	DF	FIN	Sami Hyypiä	32	2	1	0	1	0	15	1	49	3	4	0
5	FW	CZE	Milan Baroš	22 (4)	9	0 (1)	0	1 (3)	2	13 (1)	2	45	13	7	1
6	DF	NOR	John Arne Riise	34 (3)	6	0	0	3 (2)	1	15	1	57	8	2	0
7	FW	AUS	Harry Kewell	15 (3)	1	0	0	1	0	7 (5)	0	31	1	0	0
8	MF	ENG	Steven Gerrard	28 (2)	7	0	0	3	2	10	4	43	13	5	0
9	FW	FRA	Djibril Cissé	10 (6)	4	0	0	0	0	4 (5)	1	25	5	0	0
10	MF	ESP	Luis García	26 (3)	8	0	0	2 (1)	0	12	5	44	13	6	0
11	MF	CZE	Vladimír Šmicer	2 (8)	0	0	0	3	0	0 (6)	1	19	1	1	0
12	DF	ARG	Mauricio Pellegrino	11 (1)	0	0	0	1	0	0	0	13	0	1	0
13	MF	FRA	Anthony Le Tallec	2 (2)	0	0	0	0	0	1 (2)	0	7	0	0	0
14	MF	ESP	Xabi Alonso	20 (4)	2	0	0	0	0	7 (1)	1	32	3	4	0
15	MF	SEN	Salif Diao	4 (4)	0	0	0	3	1	1 (2)	0	14	1	3	0
16	MF	GER	Dietmar Hamann	23 (7)	0	0	0	3	0	8 (2)	1	43	1	11	0
17	DF	ESP	Josemi	13 (2)	0	0	0	1	0	5 (2)	0	23	0	5	1
18	MF	ESP	Antonio Núñez	8 (10)	0	0	0	2 (1)	1	2 (3)	0	26	1	2	1
19	FW	ESP	Fernando Morientes	12 (1)	3	0	0	2 (1)	1	0	0	15	3	1	0
20	GK	ENG	Scott Carson	4	0	0	0	0	0	1	0	5	0	0	0
21	DF	MLI	Djimi Traoré	18 (8)	0	1	0	5	0	10	0	42	0	3	0
22	GK	ENG	Chris Kirkland	10	0	0	0	0	0	4	0	14	0	0	0
23	DF	ENG	Jamie Carragher	38	0	0	0	3	0	15	0	56	0	8	0
24	FW	FRA	Florent Sinama Pongolle	6 (10)	2	1	0	4 (1)	1	0 (4)	1	26	4	1	0
25	MF	CRO	Igor Bišćan	8 (11)	2	1	0	4 (2)	0	8 (1)	0	35	2	2	0
28	DF	ENG	Stephen Warnock	11 (8)	0	1	0	3 (1)	0	2 (4)	0	30	0	3	0
31	DF	ENG	David Raven	0 (1)	0	1	0	1	0	0	0	3	0	1	0
32	MF	ENG	John Welsh	2 (1)	0	1	0	0 (2)	0	0 (1)	0	7	0	1	0
33	FW	ENG	Neil Mellor	6 (3)	2	0 (1)	0	4	2	1 (1)	1	16	5	2	0
34	MF	IRL	Darren Potter	0 (2)	0	1	0	3 (1)	0	1 (2)	0	10	0	0	0
37	DF	USA	Zak Whitbread	0	0	1	0	3	0	0	0	4	0	0	0
41	MF	ENG	Mark Smyth	0	0	0	0	0 (1)	0	0	0	1	0	0	0

== Aftermath ==
Liverpool celebrated their Champions League victory with a parade around the city in an open-top double-decker bus. Over 100,000 people were estimated to have shown up to the parade. Despite victory in the final, Liverpool were not guaranteed a place in the 2005–06 UEFA Champions League as they had finished out of the top four qualifying positions in the Premier League. On 10 June, UEFA decided to grant Liverpool special dispensation to defend their title, however, they would enter the Champions League in the first qualifying round and receive no country protection, which meant they could face an English team at any stage of the competition.

Liverpool finished the subsequent season in 3rd position in the Premier League, nine points behind eventual winners Chelsea. It would be another 14 years until Liverpool won another European trophy when they won the European Cup for the sixth time in the 2019 final against Tottenham.

== Bibliography ==
- Balagué, Guillem (2005). A Season on the Brink: A Portrait of Rafael Benitez's Liverpool. London: Orion Publishing. ISBN 978-0-7528-7936-9.
