= List of English football transfers summer 2004 =

This is a list of English football transfers for the 2004–05 season. Only moves featuring at least one Premier League or First Division club are listed.

The summer transfer window opened on 1 July 2004, although a few transfers took place prior to that date. Players without a club could join one at any time, either during or in between transfer windows. Clubs below Premier League level could also sign players on loan at any time. If need be, clubs could sign a goalkeeper on an emergency loan, if all others were unavailable. Clubs were able to purchase players again in January when the window re-opened.

== Transfers ==
28 April 2004

- (France) Fabien Barthez from Manchester United to (France) Marseille, free

=== May ===
Date	Name	Nat	Moving from	Moving to	Fee

17 May 2004

- (Netherlands) Robin Van Persie from Feyenoord to Arsenal, £2.75 million

18 May 2004

- (England) Emile Heskey from Liverpool to Birmingham City, £6.25m

25 May 2004

- (Netherlands) Giovanni van Bronckhorst from Arsenal to (Spain) Barcelona, Undisclosed

=== June ===
Date	Name	Nat	Moving from	Moving to	Fee

3 June 2004

- (Argentina) Juan Sebastián Verón from Chelsea to (Italy) Inter Milan, two season-long loan
- (Denmark) Martin Albrechtsen from (Denmark) FC Copenhagen to West Bromwich Albion, £2.7m
- (Turkey) Muzzy Izzet from Leicester City to Birmingham City, free

7 June 2004

- (Scotland) Paul Dickov from Leicester City to Blackburn Rovers, £150k

8 June 2004

- (Czech Republic) Petr Čech from (France) Rennes to Chelsea, £12m
- (Netherlands) Arjen Robben from (Netherlands) PSV to Chelsea, £7m

11 June 2004

- (Argentina) Gabriel Heinze from (France) Paris Saint-Germain to Manchester United, £6.9m

14 July 2004

- (England) Dion Dublin from Aston Villa to Leicester City, free
- (Republic of Ireland) Paul Butler from Wolverhampton Wanderers to Leeds United, free

18 June 2004

- (England) Darren Purse from Birmingham City to West Bromwich Albion, £500k

22 June 2004

- (Portugal) Paulo Ferreira from (Portugal) Porto to Chelsea, £13.2m

23 June 2004

- (England) Marcus Bent from Ipswich Town to Everton, £450k
- (England) Julian Gray from Crystal Palace to Birmingham City, free

=== July ===
Date	Name	Nat	Moving from	Moving to	Fee

1 July 2004

- (Denmark) Dennis Rommedahl from (Netherlands) PSV to Charlton Athletic, £1.4m
- (England) Alan Smith from (England) Leeds United to Manchester United, €9.00m

2 July 2004

- (England) James Milner from Leeds United to Newcastle United, £3.6m

5 July 2004

- (England) Les Ferdinand from Leicester City to Bolton Wanderers, free

6 July 2004

- (Netherlands) Michael Reiziger from (Spain) Barcelona to Middlesbrough, free

7 July 2004

- (Scotland) Dominic Matteo from Leeds United to Blackburn Rovers, free

8 July 2004

- (Australia) Mark Viduka from Leeds United to Middlesbrough, £4.5m

9 July 2004

- (England) Peter Crouch from Aston Villa to Southampton, £2m
- (Netherlands) Jimmy Floyd Hasselbaink from Chelsea to Middlesbrough, free
- (Portugal) Hélder Postiga from Spurs to (Portugal) Porto, £5m
- (Portugal) Pedro Mendes from (Portugal) Porto to Tottenham Hotspur, £2m
- (Netherlands) Mario Melchiot from Chelsea to Birmingham City, free
- (England) Sean Davis from Fulham to Tottenham Hotspur, Undisclosed

12 July 2004

- (Serbia and Montenegro) Mateja Kežman from (Netherlands) PSV to Chelsea, £5m
- (Denmark) Jesper Grønkjær from Chelsea to Birmingham City, £2.2m
- (Democratic Republic of the Congo) Lomana LuaLua from Newcastle United to Portsmouth, £1.7m (making a previous loan deal permanent)
- (England) David Unsworth from Everton to Portsmouth, free

14 July 2004

- (England) Teddy Sheringham from Portsmouth to West Ham United, free

15 July 2004

- (Argentina) Hernán Crespo from Chelsea to (Italy) AC Milan, season-long loan

16 July 2004

- (Germany) Markus Babbel from Liverpool to (Germany) VfB Stuttgart, Undisclosed

18 July 2004

- (England) Andy Cole from Blackburn Rovers to Fulham, free

20 July 2004

- (Ivory Coast) Didier Drogba from (France) Marseille to Chelsea, £24m
- (England) Martin Keown from Arsenal to Leicester City, free
- (Republic of Ireland) David Connolly from West Ham United to Leicester City, £500k
- (Portugal) Tiago from (Portugal) Benfica to Chelsea

21 July 2004

- (Netherlands) Patrick Kluivert from (Spain) Barcelona to Newcastle United, free
- (Wales) Gary Speed from Newcastle United to Bolton Wanderers, £750k
- (Portugal) Hugo Viana from Newcastle United to (Portugal) Sporting Lisbon season-long loan

22 July 2004

- (Denmark) Thomas Helveg from (Italy) Inter Milan to Norwich City, free

23 July 2004

- (United States) Bobby Convey from (United States) Major League Soccer (D.C. United) to Reading, Undisclosed
- (Canada) Tomasz Radzinski from Everton to Fulham, Undisclosed
- (Australia) Tim Cahill from Millwall to Everton, £2m
- (Denmark) Claus Jensen from Charlton Athletic to Fulham, £1.25m
- (England) Ray Parlour from Arsenal to Middlesbrough, free

27 July 2004

- (Portugal) Ricardo Carvalho from (Portugal) Porto to Chelsea, £19.85m
- (Senegal) Papa Bouba Diop from (France) Lens to Fulham, Undisclosed
- (Spain) Josemi from (Spain) Málaga to Liverpool, £2m
- (Russia) Serhii Rebrov from Tottenham Hotspur to West Ham, free

28 July 2004

- (Spain) Fernando Hierro from (Qatar) Al Rayyan to Bolton Wanderers, free

29 July 2004

- (Senegal) Henri Camara from Wolves to (Scotland) Celtic season-long loan
- (England) Nicky Butt from Manchester United to Newcastle United, £2.5m
- (England) Jonathan Greening from Middlesbrough to West Bromwich Albion £1.25m

30 July 2004

- (Hungary) Zoltan Gera from (Hungary) Ferencváros to West Bromwich Albion, £1.5m
- (Nigeria) Nwankwo Kanu from Arsenal to West Bromwich Albion, free

=== August ===
Date	Name	Nat	Moving from	Moving to	Fee

2 August 2004

- (Netherlands) Boudewijn Zenden from Chelsea to Middlesbrough, free (making a previous loan deal permanent)
- (Scotland) Neil Sullivan from Chelsea to Leeds United, free

5 August 2004

- (Sweden) Mattias Jonson from (Denmark) Brøndby to Norwich City, Undisclosed

10 August 2004

- (England) Francis Jeffers from Arsenal to Charlton Athletic, £2.6m
- (Republic of Ireland) Stephen Carr from Tottenham Hotspur to Newcastle United, Undisclosed
- (Italy) Paolo di Canio from Charlton Athletic to (Italy) Lazio, free
- (England) Darren Anderton from Tottenham Hotspur to Birmingham City, free

12 August 2004

- (England) Fitz Hall from Southampton to Crystal Palace, £1.5m
- (Hungary) Gabor Kiraly from (Germany) Hertha Berlin to Crystal Palace, free

13 August 2004

- (England) Michael Owen from Liverpool to (Spain) Real Madrid, £12m
- (Spain) Antonio Nuñez from (Spain) Real Madrid to Liverpool, free (Part of Owen deal)

20 August 2004

- (Spain) Xabi Alonso from (Spain) Real Sociedad to Liverpool, £10.5m
- (Spain) Luis Garcia from (Spain) Barcelona to Liverpool, Undisclosed
- (England) Jonathan Woodgate from Newcastle United to (Spain) Real Madrid, £15m

21 August 2004

- (Uruguay) Diego Forlán from Manchester United to (Spain) Villarreal, Undisclosed

24 August 2004

- (England) Michael Carrick from West Ham United to Tottenham Hotspur, Undisclosed

28 August 2004

- (South Korea) Seol Ki-hyun from (Belgium) Anderlecht to Wolves, £2m

30 August 2004

- (Wales) Robert Earnshaw from (Wales) Cardiff City to West Brom, £3m

31 August 2004

- (Japan) Junichi Inamoto from (Japan) Gamba Osaka to West Brom, £200k
- (England) Wayne Rooney from Everton to Manchester United, £26m
- (Trinidad and Tobago) Dwight Yorke from Blackburn Rovers to Birmingham City, free
- (France) Sylvain Wiltord from Arsenal to (France) Lyon, free
- (Costa Rica) Paulo Wanchope from Manchester City to (Spain) Málaga CF, £500k
- (Sweden) Marcus Allbäck from Aston Villa to (Germany) Hansa Rostock, free
- (England) Calum Davenport from Coventry City to Tottenham Hotspur, £3m
- (Brazil) Juninho Paulista from Middlesbrough to (Scotland) Celtic, free
