= 2004–05 Football League Cup =

Carling Cup, League Cup

Tournament details
- Country: England; Wales
- Teams: 92

Final positions
- Champions: Chelsea (3rd title)
- Runners-up: Liverpool

Tournament statistics
- Matches played: 93
- Top goal scorer(s): Jermain Defoe (5 goals)

The 2004–05 Football League Cup (known as the Carling Cup for sponsorship reasons) was the 45th staging of the Football League Cup, a knockout competition for England's top 92 football clubs. The competition name reflects a sponsorship deal with lager brand Carling.

The competition began in August 2004 and ended with the final on 25 February 2005. The Millennium Stadium in Cardiff hosted the final match, as it had done since 2001, with the new Wembley Stadium still not complete.

The winners were Chelsea, beating Liverpool in the final 3–2 thanks to an own goal from Steven Gerrard, and goals in extra-time from Didier Drogba and Mateja Kežman in extra-time after the match finished 1–1.

== First round ==
Tie no	Home team	Score^{1}	Away team	Date
1	Mansfield Town	0–4	Preston North End	21 September 2004
2	Boston United	3–3	Luton Town	7 September 2004
Boston United win 4–3 after extra time
3	Bradford City	1–1	Notts County	25 August 2004
Notts County win 2–1 after extra time
4	Coventry City	4–1	Torquay United	25 August 2004
5	Nottingham Forest	2–0	Scunthorpe United	25 August 2004
6	Oxford United	0–2	Reading	25 August 2004
7	Sheffield Wednesday	1–0	Walsall	25 August 2004
8	Brighton & Hove Albion	1–2	Bristol Rovers	24 August 2004
9	Bury	2–3	Burnley	24 August 2004
10	Colchester United	2–1	Cheltenham Town	24 August 2004
11	Crewe Alexandra	4–1	Blackpool	24 August 2004
12	Darlington	0–2	Barnsley	24 August 2004
13	Doncaster Rovers	3–1	Port Vale	24 August 2004
14	Gillingham	1–2	Northampton Town	24 August 2004
15	Grimsby Town	1–0	Wigan Athletic	24 August 2004
16	Hartlepool United	2–1	Macclesfield Town	24 August 2004
17	Hull City	2–2	Wrexham	24 August 2004
2–2 after extra time — Wrexham win 3 – 1 on penalties
18	Ipswich Town	2–0	Brentford	24 August 2004
19	Kidderminster Harriers	1–1	Cardiff City	24 August 2004
1–1 after extra time — Cardiff City win 5–4 on penalties
20	Leeds United	1–0	Huddersfield Town	24 August 2004
21	Leyton Orient	1–3	Bournemouth	24 August 2004
22	Lincoln City	3–1	Derby County	24 August 2004
23	Oldham Athletic	2–1	Stoke City	24 August 2004
24	Peterborough United	0–3	Milton Keynes Dons	24 August 2004
25	Queens Park Rangers	3–0	Swansea City	24 August 2004
26	Rotherham United	2–1	Chesterfield	24 August 2004
27	Rushden & Diamonds	0–1	Swindon Town	24 August 2004
28	Sheffield United	1–1	Stockport County	24 August 2004
Sheffield United win 4–1 after extra time
29	Sunderland	3–0	Chester City	24 August 2004
30	Tranmere Rovers	2–1	Shrewsbury Town	24 August 2004
31	Watford	1–0	Cambridge United	24 August 2004
32	West Ham United	2–0	Southend United	23 August 2004
33	Wycombe Wanderers	0–1	Bristol City	24 August 2004
34	Yeovil Town	2–2	Plymouth Argyle	24 August 2004
Yeovil win 3–2 after extra time
35	Rochdale	2–4	Wolverhampton Wanderers	23 August 2004

== Second round ==
Tie no	Home team	Score^{1}	Away team	Date
1	Leicester City	2–2	Preston North End	4 October 2004
Preston win 2–3 after extra time
2	Aston Villa	3–1	Queens Park Rangers	22 September 2004
3	Blackburn Rovers	2–2	Bournemouth	22 September 2004
3–3 after extra time — Bournemouth win 7 – 6 on penalties
4	Boston United	1–4	Fulham	22 September 2004
5	Bristol City	2–2	Everton	22 September 2004
2–2 after extra time — Everton win 4–3 on penalties
6	Coventry City	1–0	Sheffield Wednesday	22 September 2004
7	Northampton Town	0–3	Southampton	22 September 2004
8	Nottingham Forest	1–1	Rotherham United	22 September 2004
Nottingham Forest win 2–1 after extra time
9	Oldham Athletic	0–6	Tottenham Hotspur	22 September 2004
10	Birmingham City	3–1	Lincoln City	21 September 2004
11	Burnley	1–1	Wolverhampton Wanderers	21 September 2004
1–1 after extra time — Burnley win 4–2 on penalties
12	Crystal Palace	1–1	Hartlepool United	21 September 2004
Crystal Palace win 2–1 after extra time
13	Colchester United	1–1	West Bromwich Albion	21 September 2004
Colchester United win 2–1 after extra time
14	Crewe Alexandra	2–2	Sunderland	21 September 2004
3–3 after extra time — Crewe Alexandra win 4–2 on penalties
15	Doncaster Rovers	2–0	Ipswich Town	21 September 2004
16	Grimsby Town	0–2	Charlton Athletic	21 September 2004
17	Leeds United	1–0	Swindon Town	21 September 2004
18	Milton Keynes Dons	1–4	Cardiff City	21 September 2004
19	Manchester City	7–1	Barnsley	21 September 2004
20	Norwich City	1–0	Bristol Rovers	21 September 2004
21	Reading	0–3	Watford	21 September 2004
22	Tranmere Rovers	0–1	Portsmouth	21 September 2004
23	West Ham United	3–2	Notts County	21 September 2004
24	Wrexham	2–3	Sheffield United	21 September 2004
25	Yeovil Town	0–2	Bolton Wanderers	21 September 2004

== Third round ==
Tie no	Home team	Score^{1}	Away team	Date
1	Birmingham City	0–1	Fulham	27 October 2004
2	Bolton Wanderers	2–2	Tottenham Hotspur	27 October 2004
Tottenham Hotspur win 4–3 after extra time
3	Charlton Athletic	1–2	Crystal Palace	27 October 2004
4	Chelsea	1–0	West Ham United	27 October 2004
5	Everton	2–0	Preston	27 October 2004
6	Manchester City	1–2	Arsenal	27 October 2004
7	Middlesbrough	3–0	Coventry City	27 October 2004
8	Newcastle United	2–1	Norwich City	27 October 2004
9	Southampton	3–2	Colchester United	27 October 2004
10	Bournemouth	2–2	Cardiff City	26 October 2004
3–3 after extra time — Cardiff City win 5 – 4 on penalties
11	Burnley	3–1	Aston Villa	26 October 2004
12	Crewe Alexandra	0–3	Manchester United	26 October 2004
13	Doncaster Rovers	0–2	Nottingham Forest	26 October 2004
14	Millwall	0–3	Liverpool	26 October 2004
15	Portsmouth	2–1	Leeds United	26 October 2004
16	Sheffield United	0–0	Watford	26 October 2004
0–0 after extra time — Watford win 4 – 2 on penalties

== Fourth round ==
10 November 2004

Liverpool	2–0	Middlesbrough
Mellor 83', 89'

Anfield, Liverpool
Attendance: 28,176
Referee: Howard Webb

10 November 2004

Manchester United	2–0	Crystal Palace
Saha 22'; Richardson 39'

Old Trafford, Manchester
Attendance: 48,891
Referee: Steve Dunn

10 November 2004

Newcastle United	0–2 (a.e.t.)	Chelsea
		Guðjohnsen 100'; Robben 112'

St James' Park, Newcastle
Attendance: 38,055
Referee: Steve Bennett

10 November 2004

Nottingham Forest	2–4 (a.e.t.)	Fulham
King 71'; Reid 104'		Radzinski 86', 93'; McBride 101'; Cole 119'

City Ground, Nottingham
Attendance: 9,252
Referee: Mike Riley

9 November 2004

Arsenal	3–1	Everton
Owusu-Abeyie 25'; Lupoli 52', 85'		Gravesen 8'

Highbury, London
Attendance: 27,791
Referee: Alan Wiley

9 November 2004

Burnley	0–3	Tottenham Hotspur
		Keane 31', 52'; Defoe 58'

Turf Moor, Burnley
Attendance: 10,639
Referee: Graham Poll

9 November 2004

Cardiff City	0–2	Portsmouth
		Yakubu 47', 55' (pen.)

Ninian Park, Cardiff
Attendance: 13,555
Referee: Graham Laws

9 November 2004

Watford	5–2	Southampton
Dyer 39'; Chambers 52', 62'; Helguson 66'; Bouazza 84'		Blackstock 84'; Ormerod 88'

Vicarage Road, Watford
Attendance: 13,008
Referee: Barry Knight

== Quarter-finals ==
1 December 2004

Manchester United	1–0	Arsenal
Bellion 1'

Old Trafford, Manchester
Attendance: 67,103
Referee: Mark Halsey

1 December 2004

Tottenham Hotspur	1–1 (a.e.t.)	Liverpool
Defoe 108'	Report	Sinama Pongolle 117' (pen.)
Penalties
	3–4

White Hart Lane, London
Attendance: 36,100
Referee: Neale Barry

30 November 2004

Fulham	1–2	Chelsea
McBride 74'	Report	Duff 55'; Lampard 88'

Craven Cottage, London
Attendance: 14,531
Referee: Steve Dunn

30 November 2004

Watford	3–0	Portsmouth
Helguson 24', 57'; Dyer 61'	Report

Vicarage Road, Watford
Attendance: 18,877
Referee: Dermot Gallagher

== Semi-finals ==
=== First leg ===
12 January 2005
20:00

Chelsea	0–0	Manchester United

Stamford Bridge, London
Attendance: 41,492
Referee: Neale Barry

11 January 2005
20:00

Liverpool	1–0	Watford
Gerrard 56'

Anfield, Liverpool
Attendance: 35,739
Referee: Steve Dunn

=== Second leg ===
26 January 2005
20:00

Manchester United	1–2	Chelsea
Giggs 67'		Lampard 29'; Duff 85'

Old Trafford, Manchester
Attendance: 67,000
Referee: Rob Styles

Chelsea win 2–1 on aggregate.

25 January 2005
19:45

Watford	0–1	Liverpool
		Gerrard 77'

Vicarage Road, Watford
Attendance: 19,797
Referee: Mike Riley

Liverpool win 2–0 on aggregate

== Final ==
27 February 2005
15:00

Liverpool	2–3	Chelsea
Riise 1'; Núñez 113'		Gerrard 79' (o.g.); Drogba 107'; Kežman 112'

Millennium Stadium, Cardiff
Attendance: 78,000
Referee: Steve Bennett (Kent)

== See also ==
- Football League Cup
