= 2005 UEFA Champions League final =

Association football match

- Match programme cover
- Event: 2004–05 UEFA Champions League
Milan	Liverpool
(Italy)	(England)
3	3
- After extra time Liverpool won 3–2 on penalties
- Date: 25 May 2005
- Venue: Atatürk Olympic Stadium, Istanbul, Turkey
- Man of the Match: Steven Gerrard (Liverpool)
- Referee: Manuel Mejuto González (Spain)
- Attendance: 69,000
- Weather: Clear night 18 °C (64 °F); 78% humidity

The 2005 UEFA Champions League final was the final match of the 2004–05 UEFA Champions League, Europe's primary club football competition. The showpiece event was contested between Milan of Italy and Liverpool of England at the Atatürk Olympic Stadium in Istanbul on 25 May 2005. Liverpool, who had won the competition four times, were appearing in their sixth final, and their first since 1985. Milan, who had won the competition six times, were appearing in their second final in three years and tenth overall.

Each club needed to progress through the group stage and knockout rounds to reach the final, playing 12 matches in total. Liverpool finished second in their group behind 2004 runners-up Monaco and subsequently beat Bayer Leverkusen, Juventus and Chelsea to progress to the final. Milan won their group ahead of Barcelona and faced Manchester United, Inter Milan and PSV Eindhoven before reaching the final.

Milan were regarded as favourites before the match and took the lead within the first minute through captain Paolo Maldini. Milan striker Hernán Crespo added two more goals before half-time to make it 3–0. In the second half Liverpool launched a comeback and scored three goals in a dramatic six-minute spell to level the scores at 3–3, with goals from Steven Gerrard, Vladimír Šmicer and Xabi Alonso. The scores remained the same during extra time, and a penalty shoot-out was required to decide the champions. The score was 3–2 to Liverpool when Andriy Shevchenko's penalty was saved by Liverpool goalkeeper Jerzy Dudek. It was Liverpool's fifth European Cup, which meant they were awarded the trophy permanently and the right to wear a multiple-winner badge. Liverpool's comeback gave rise to the final being known as the Miracle of Istanbul, and is regarded as one of the greatest finals in the history of the tournament.

== Background ==
This was Liverpool's sixth final and it was their first appearance since the 1985 European Cup final, when they lost 1–0 to Juventus and were subsequently banned from European competition for six years due to the Heysel Stadium disaster. They had previously won the European Cup on four occasions in 1977, 1978, 1981 and 1984. The match was Milan's tenth appearance in the final. They had won on six occasions (1963, 1969, 1989, 1990, 1994, 2003), and lost three times (1958, 1993, 1995). In total the teams had participated in 14 finals between them. Prior to the game, Milan were assured of entering the Champions League the following season after finishing second in Serie A. Liverpool meanwhile had failed to finish in the top four in the Premier League, and had to win the final to enter the competition the following season. Even if they did win the match, they were not assured of a place after UEFA failed to confirm whether they would allow Liverpool to defend the championship. The Football Association supported Liverpool, stating, "We have already submitted a written request to have an additional place, should they win the Champions League". Milan manager Carlo Ancelotti said "I think a team that wins should have the right to defend it but we may just do the English federation a favour and solve this."

Milan were regarded as favourites and their team included many players who had experienced success in the competition. The most notable was captain Paolo Maldini, who had won the competition four times previously, all with Milan, and Clarence Seedorf, who had won the competition three times with three clubs. Liverpool had been considered underdogs throughout the competition, but had beaten more favoured opposition, including Juventus and Chelsea, to reach the final. Liverpool manager Rafael Benítez acknowledged this: "Maybe Milan are favourites, but we have confidence, and we can win". Arsenal manager Arsène Wenger felt Liverpool would win the match: "I fancy Liverpool as Milan look jaded physically and certainly mentally, by losing the [Serie A] title, I think they have never had a better chance than now to beat Milan." Liverpool defender Jamie Carragher was not so optimistic, stating that the Liverpool side were not as good as the one that had won the 2001 UEFA Cup final: "No disrespect to the squad we have got now but it is obvious we are not as strong as we were when we won the UEFA Cup in 2001. Back then we had a settled team and that season when we went into games against Barcelona and Roma, we always felt we were as good as them."

== Venue ==
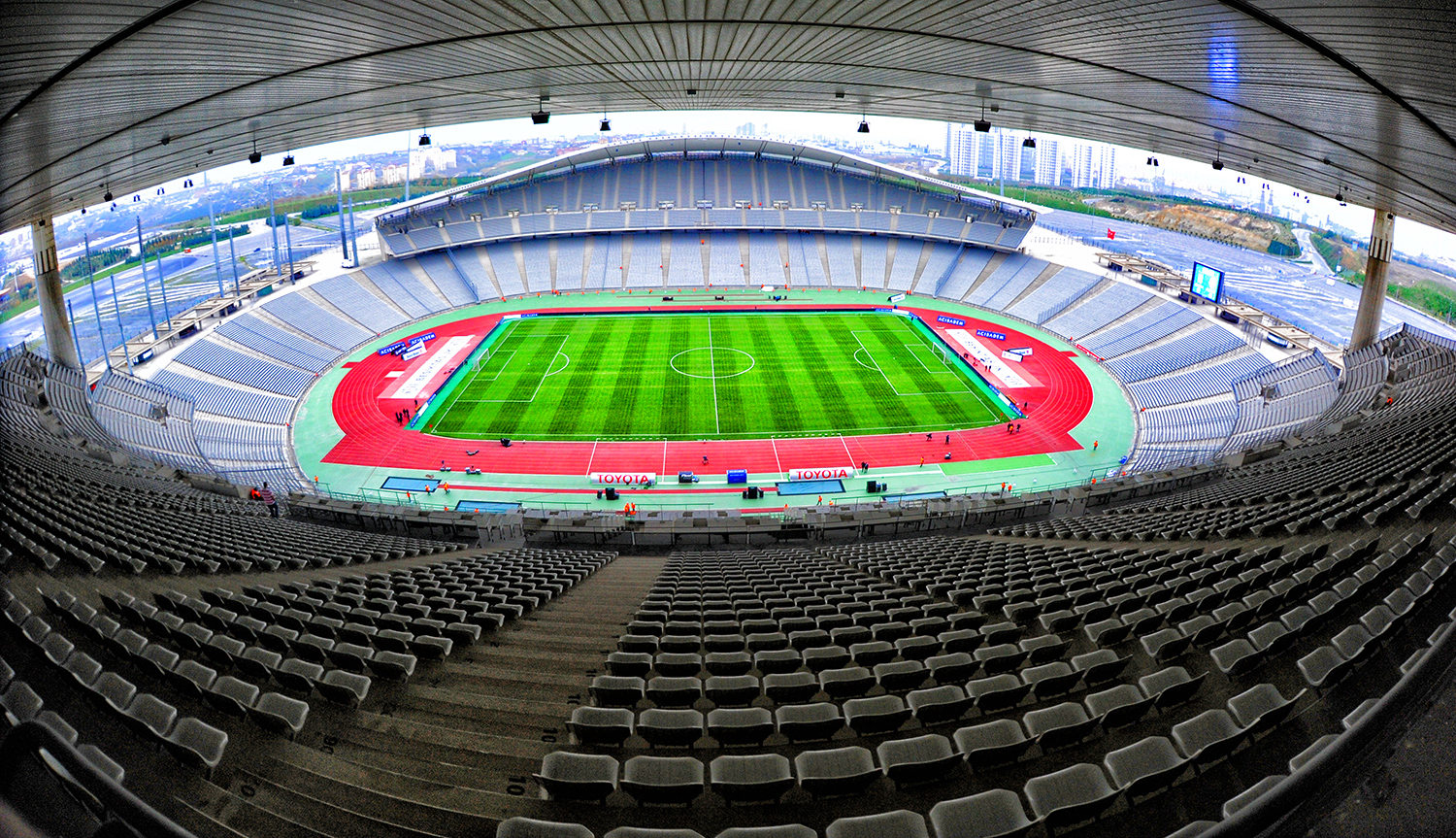
The Atatürk Olympic Stadium held the final

The final was held at Istanbul's Atatürk Olympic Stadium; it was the first time a European final had been held in Turkey. There were reservations about holding the final in Turkey but UEFA chief executive, Lars-Christer Olsson was satisfied by the assurances of the Turkish authorities: "The conditions there are the same, generally, as for all countries and they have given guarantees, this is important, especially since their experiences last autumn. We have also asked for additional investments in the infrastructure around the stadium and they have agreed to this, too."

== Route to the final ==
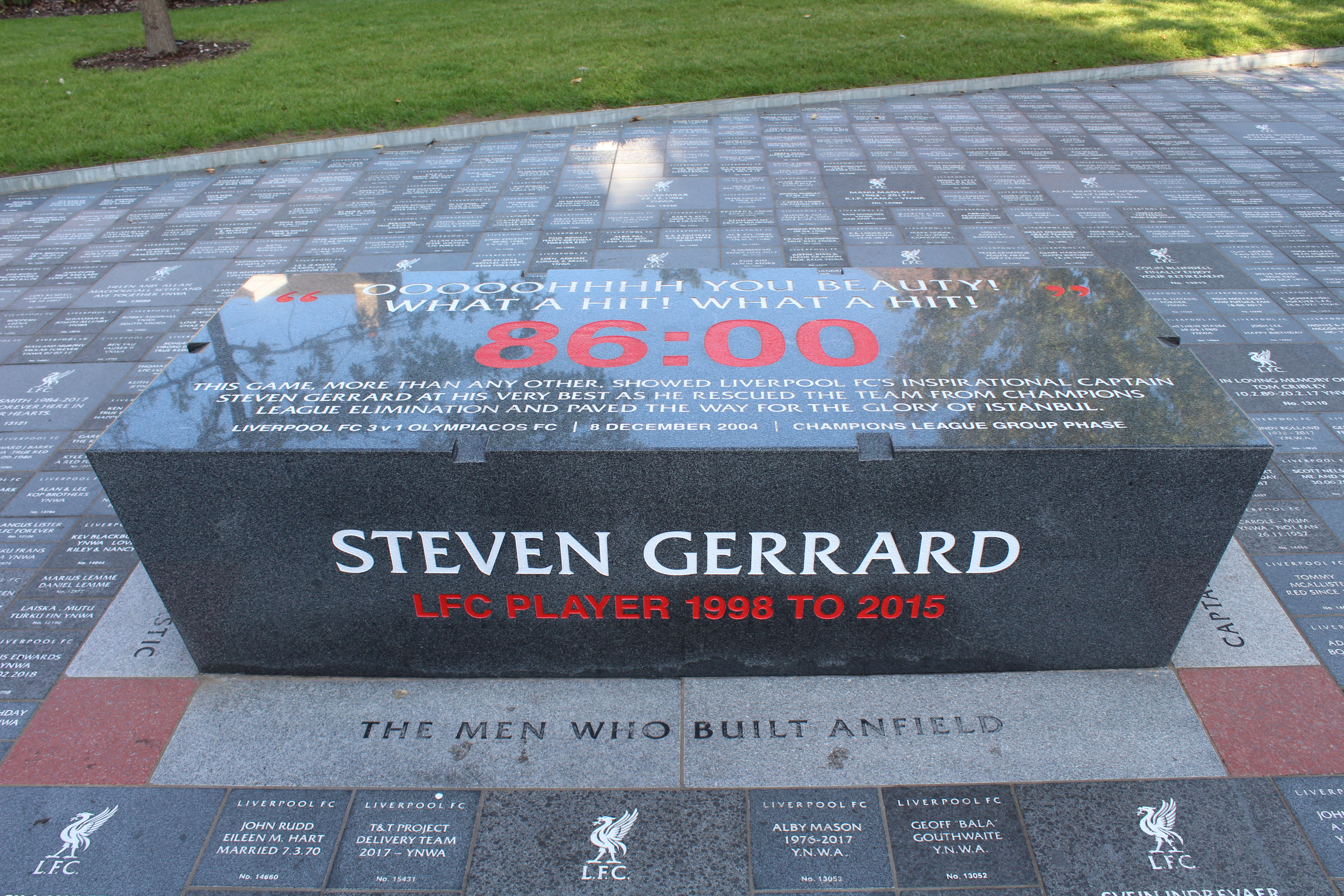
The Steven Gerrard plinth outside Anfield inscribed with 86 minutes (the time of his strike for Liverpool against Olympiacos) and the commentary: "Oh, you beauty! What a hit son! What a hit!"

Teams qualified for the Champions League group stage, either directly or through three preliminary rounds, based on both their position in the preceding domestic league and the strength of that league. The competition proper started with the group stage, contested as eight double round-robin groups of four teams, with the top two qualifying for the knockout stages. The knockout stage ties from the round of 16 to the semi-finals were decided based on home and away matches.

Milan entered the competition in the group stage after winning Serie A. They won their group ahead of Barcelona and faced Manchester United, Inter Milan and PSV Eindhoven before reaching the final.

Liverpool entered the competition in the third qualifying round after finishing fourth in the 2003–04 FA Premier League. They faced Austrian side GAK and won the first leg 2–0 at Graz after two goals from captain Steven Gerrard. They lost the second leg 1–0 at Anfield but progressed to the group stage by virtue of winning the tie 2–1 on aggregate. Liverpool finished second in their group behind 2004 Champions League runners-up Monaco. In Liverpool's final group stage match against Olympiacos on 8 December, Steven Gerrard scored a 25-yard half volley in the 86th minute to send the club through to the knockout round. A strike that saw co-commentator Andy Gray exclaim, "Oh, you beauty! What a hit son! What a hit!", Gerrard stated it was his most important, if not his best, goal for Liverpool to date. In the knockout rounds, Liverpool beat Bayer Leverkusen, Juventus and Chelsea to progress to the final. The winning goal in the semi-final scored by Luis García was dubbed a ghost goal by Chelsea manager José Mourinho. He did however recognise the atmosphere generated by Liverpool fans in the match: "I felt the power of Anfield, it was magnificent."

(Italy) Milan				Round	(England) Liverpool			
Opponent	Agg.	1st leg	2nd leg	Qualifying phase	Opponent	Agg.	1st leg	2nd leg
Bye				Third qualifying round	(Austria) GAK	2–1	2–0 (A)	0–1 (H)
Opponent	Result			Group stage	Opponent	Result		
(Ukraine) Shakhtar Donetsk	1–0 (A)			Matchday 1	(France) Monaco	2–0 (H)		
(Scotland) Celtic	3–1 (H)			Matchday 2	(Greece) Olympiacos	0–1 (A)		
(Spain) Barcelona	1–0 (H)			Matchday 3	(Spain) Deportivo La Coruña	0–0 (H)		
(Spain) Barcelona	1–2 (A)			Matchday 4	(Spain) Deportivo La Coruña	1–0 (A)		
(Ukraine) Shakhtar Donetsk	4–0 (H)			Matchday 5	(France) Monaco	0–1 (A)		
(Scotland) Celtic	0–0 (A)			Matchday 6	(Greece) Olympiacos	3–1 (H)		
Group F winners: Pos / Team / Pld / Pts; 1 / (Italy) Milan / 6 / 13; 2 / (Spain) Barcelona / 6 / 10; 3 / (Ukraine) Shakhtar Donetsk / 6 / 6; 4 / (Scotland) Celtic / 6 / 5; Source:				Final standings	Group A runners-up: Pos / Team / Pld / Pts; 1 / (France) Monaco / 6 / 12; 2 / (England) Liverpool / 6 / 10; 3 / (Greece) Olympiacos / 6 / 10; 4 / (Spain) Deportivo La Coruña / 6 / 2; Source:			
Opponent	Agg.	1st leg	2nd leg	Knockout stage	Opponent	Agg.	1st leg	2nd leg
(England) Manchester United	2–0	1–0 (A)	1–0 (H)	First knockout round	(Germany) Bayer Leverkusen	6–2	3–1 (H)	3–1 (A)
(Italy) Inter Milan	5–0	2–0 (H)	3–0 (A)	Quarter-finals	(Italy) Juventus	2–1	2–1 (H)	0–0 (A)
(Netherlands) PSV Eindhoven	3–3 (a)	2–0 (H)	1–3 (A)	Semi-finals	(England) Chelsea	1–0	0–0 (A)	1–0 (H)

== Pre-match ==
=== Ticketing ===
Each team was allocated 20,000 tickets for the final, out of a total of 69,000. 14,400 tickets were made available to the general public, with half of those allocated through a ballot on UEFA's website, and the other half reserved for Turkish fans by the Turkish Football Federation. The final 14,600 tickets were distributed to UEFA's "football family", consisting of UEFA officials, national football associations, commercial partners and broadcasters. Hotel rooms in the city were scarce, with the 100,000 available quickly booked by travel agents and fans. At least 30,000 Liverpool fans made the trip to Istanbul, but only 20,000 were expected to have tickets. The BBC reported early arrivals were lively but there was no violence and the mood between the two fans was friendly.

=== Team selection ===
Milan were expected to field a 4–4–2 formation, and there was much speculation about who would partner Andriy Shevchenko in attack. Filippo Inzaghi and Jon Dahl Tomasson were touted, but it was expected that on-loan striker Hernán Crespo would be chosen. This was echoed by Milan manager Ancelotti: "I will not say if he will play from the start, but he will definitely play." Liverpool were also expected to adopt a 4–4–2 formation. Dietmar Hamann was expected to start ahead of Igor Bišćan, and when questioned over whether Djibril Cissé or Milan Baroš would start as main striker, Benítez replied, "Both are good enough, maybe both can play, why not?"

=== Officials ===
The referee for the final was Manuel Mejuto González, who led an all-Spanish crew of officials. His assistant referees were Oscar Martínez Samaniego and Clemente Ayete Plou, and the fourth official was Arturo Daudén Ibáñez. Mejuto González was only the third Spanish referee to officiate a European Cup final, following Manuel Díaz Vega in 1996 and José María Ortiz de Mendíbil in 1969.

== Match ==
=== Summary ===
==== First half ====
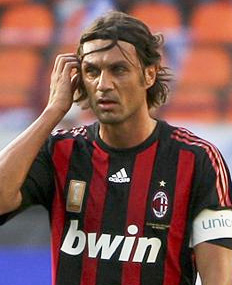
Milan captain Paolo Maldini scored in the first minute of the match

Liverpool fielded a 4–4–1–1 formation, with the surprise inclusion in the squad being Harry Kewell, who played just behind Milan Baroš, who himself had been picked ahead of Djibril Cissé. The inclusion of Kewell meant Dietmar Hamann was left on the substitutes' bench and Xabi Alonso and Steven Gerrard started in the centre of midfield. Milan fielded a 4–4–2 diamond formation, with Hernán Crespo preferred to Jon Dahl Tomasson and Filippo Inzaghi, who was not included in the match day squad. Liverpool lined up in their red home kit, whilst Milan wore a changed strip of all white, which they historically used in European Cup finals. Liverpool won the coin toss and kicked off.

Milan scored within the first minute of the match after captain Paolo Maldini volleyed in an Andrea Pirlo free kick that had been conceded by Djimi Traoré. The goal made Maldini the oldest scorer in the history of the competition. Liverpool responded almost immediately; John Arne Riise, who was picked out by a corner kick from Steven Gerrard, hit a volley from the edge of the penalty box. His shot was cleared only for Gerrard to cross in from the right wing, which Sami Hyypiä headed towards goal producing a save out of Dida. Milan almost extended their lead in the 13th minute, after Crespo's header was cleared off the goal line by Luis García. A few minutes later, Liverpool made a substitution after Harry Kewell picked up a groin injury; he was replaced by Vladimír Šmicer. Soon after, Kaká passed through to Andriy Shevchenko who put his shot past Liverpool goalkeeper Jerzy Dudek, but Shevchenko was adjudged to have been in an offside position and the goal did not stand. Shevchenko had another chance to score a few minutes later; after being played onside by Traore, his shot was saved by Dudek after he came under pressure from the Liverpool defence. Luis García had two chances to score following Shevchenko's shot; the first shot from the edge of the penalty area went well over the crossbar and after he was headed through by Baroš his next shot went wide. Straight after this attack, Crespo went through on goal only to be flagged for offside. Almost immediately after this, Liverpool had a penalty claim turned down after Alessandro Nesta allegedly handballed. Milan countered and scored; Kaka dribbled the ball into the Liverpool half and passed to Shevchenko, who passed to Crespo at the far post to score and make it 2–0. Minutes later, Crespo extended Milan's lead with a chip over Dudek after Kaka provided the assist to make it 3–0.

==== Second half ====
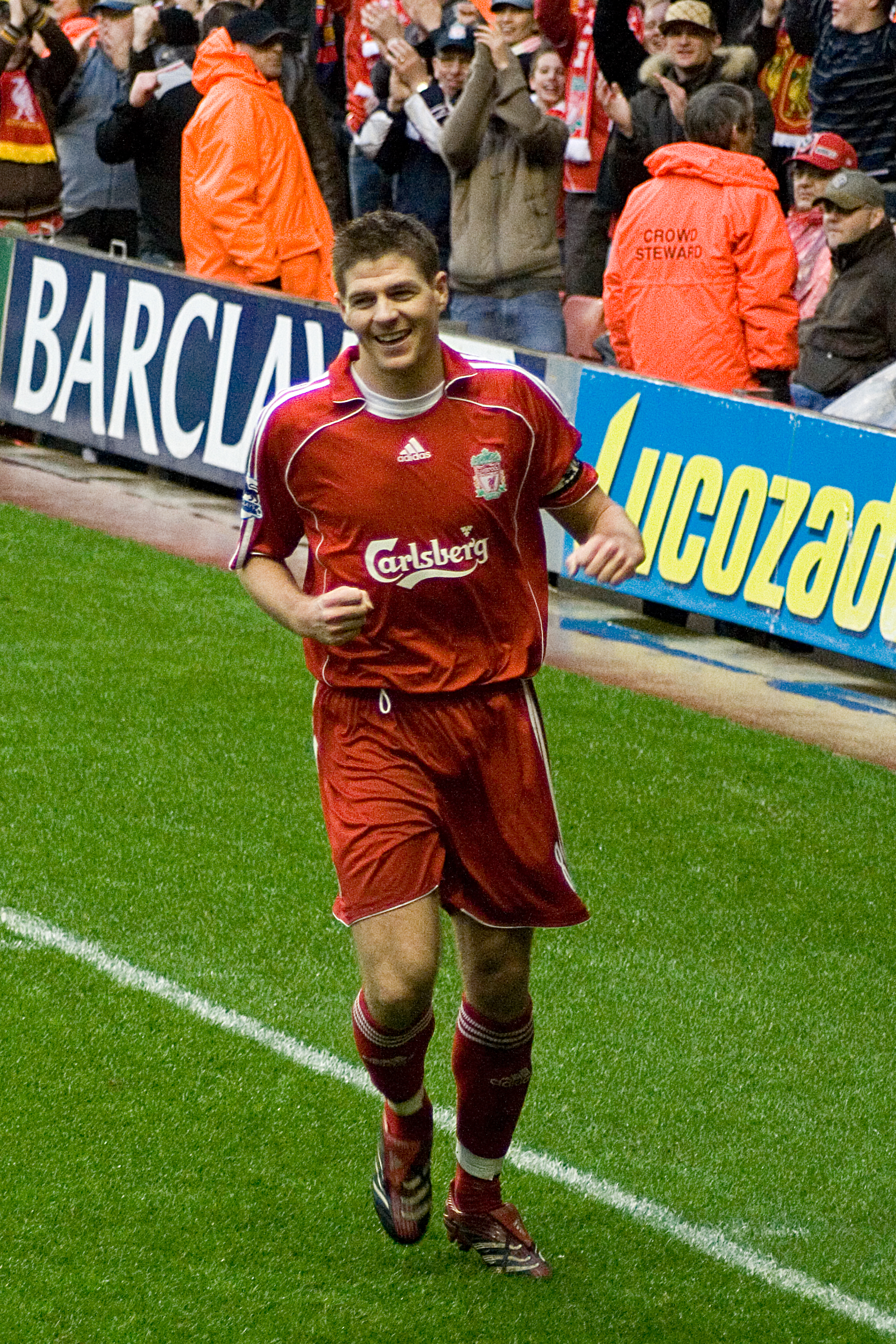
Steven Gerrard scored a goal and won a penalty as Liverpool came from behind to win the final

At the start of the second half, Liverpool made a substitution with Dietmar Hamann replacing Steve Finnan and also changed to a 3–4–2–1 formation to reduce the deficit, with Riise and Šmicer on the flanks, Alonso and Hamann as holding midfielders and Gerrard playing as an attacking midfielder. Liverpool had the best chance early on with Xabi Alonso sending an effort from 35 yards (32 m) narrowly past Milan's right hand post. Two minutes later, Shevchenko forced a save from Dudek with a strong free-kick from just outside the Liverpool box.

A minute after this, Liverpool scored through captain Gerrard, who connected with Riise's cross and lofted a header past Dida. Soon afterwards, Liverpool scored again as Šmicer beat Dida with a long-range shot into the bottom left-hand corner to leave Liverpool a goal behind. Three minutes after Šmicer's goal, Liverpool were awarded a penalty, after Gerrard made a run into the Milan box for Baros' lay-off and was brought down by Gennaro Gattuso. Alonso's penalty was saved, but he scored from the rebound to equalise for Liverpool. Milan and Liverpool had chances to take the lead after this, but Clarence Seedorf and Riise failed to score.

Milan almost took the lead in the 70th minute, after Dudek dropped a low cross towards Shevchenko, whose effort was cleared off the line by Traoré. Gerrard then had a chance to score but he sent his shot over the crossbar. About ten minutes later García could not control a pass from Gerrard which led to a Milan attack, Crespo played the ball back to Kaka, whose subsequent shot was blocked by Jamie Carragher. A number of substitutions were made before full-time with Liverpool replacing Milan Baroš with Djibril Cissé, while Milan replaced Hernán Crespo and Clarence Seedorf with Jon Dahl Tomasson and Serginho respectively. Milan had the last chance before full-time but Kaka failed to direct Jaap Stam's header towards goal, meaning the final went to extra time for the 13th time in the competition's history.

==== Extra time ====
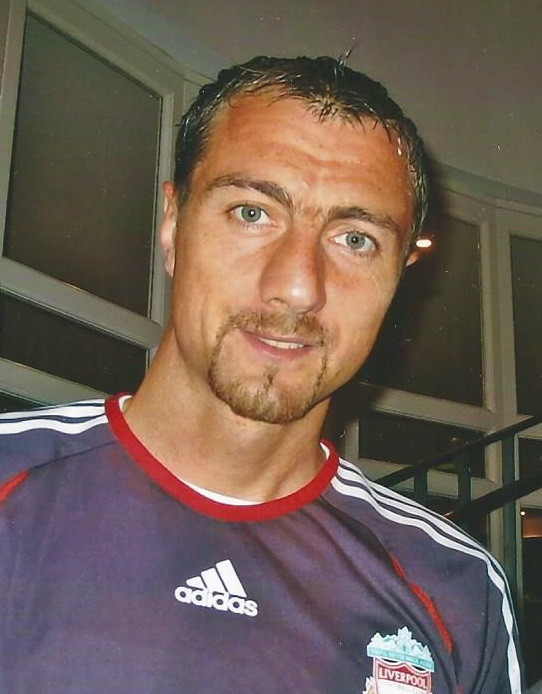
Liverpool goalkeeper Jerzy Dudek described his second save from Andriy Shevchenko in the 117th minute as "the save of my life".

Liverpool kicked off the first half of extra time. Pirlo had a chance in the early stages, but he put his shot over the crossbar. Tomasson came close in the later stages of the first period of extra time, but he could not make contact with the ball. Šmicer required treatment for cramp towards the end of the first period, as a number of Liverpool players felt fatigued. Liverpool had most of the early exchanges after winning two corners, but could not score. Shortly afterwards, Milan made their final substitution, replacing Gennaro Gattuso with Rui Costa.

The best chance of the second half of extra time came in the 117th minute (three minutes from penalties) when Shevchenko shot at goal. Dudek saved, only for it to rebound back out to Shevchenko, who again shot from under 3 yards (2.7 m), which Dudek saved again, pushing the shot over the bar. Liverpool had one last chance at the end of extra time, but John Arne Riise's free kick was blocked, and following this the referee signalled the end of extra time, which meant a penalty shoot-out would decide the championship.

==== Penalties ====
Liverpool and Milan had each won their last European Cups after winning penalty shoot-outs, and it was also the second time in three years that the final would be decided this way; previously, in the 2003 all-Italian final at Old Trafford, Milan had defeated Juventus 3–2. Milan were first to take a penalty, but Serginho – who had taken Milan's first penalty in 2003 and scored – shot over the crossbar after attempts from Dudek to distract him, which mimicked Bruce Grobbelaar's "spaghetti legs" antics during the shootout in the 1984 final against Roma. Dietmar Hamann took Liverpool's first penalty and, despite having a broken toe, he scored to put Liverpool 1–0 up. Andrea Pirlo was next for Milan, and his penalty was saved by Dudek who dived low to his right. Cisse then scored his penalty to put Liverpool 2–0 up. Tomasson scored Milan's next penalty to make the score 2–1 in Liverpool's favour. Riise was next for Liverpool, but his penalty was saved by Dida. Kaká then scored the subsequent penalty to level the scores at 2–2. Šmicer took the next Liverpool penalty and scored with his eventual last competitive kick for Liverpool to put them on the brink of victory.

Shevchenko, who had scored the decisive penalty against Juventus' Gianluigi Buffon in 2003, then had to score to keep Milan in the shootout. He hit his penalty straight down the middle of the goal and Dudek went down to his right, but blocked the shot with his left hand to give Liverpool a 3–2 win in the shoot-out.

=== Details ===
25 May 2005
21:45 UTC+3

Milan (Italy)	3–3 (a.e.t.)	(England) Liverpool
Maldini 1'; Crespo 39', 44'	Report	Gerrard 54'; Šmicer 56'; Alonso 60'
Penalties
Serginho (penalty missed); Pirlo (penalty missed); Tomasson (penalty scored); Kaká (penalty scored); Shevchenko (penalty missed)	2–3	(penalty scored) Hamann; (penalty scored) Cissé; (penalty missed) Riise; (penalty scored) Šmicer

Atatürk Olympic Stadium, Istanbul
Attendance: 69,000
Referee: Manuel Mejuto González (Spain)

Milan	Liverpool

GK	1	(Brazil) Dida
RB	2	(Brazil) Cafu
CB	31	(Netherlands) Jaap Stam
CB	13	(Italy) Alessandro Nesta
LB	3	(Italy) Paolo Maldini (c)
DM	21	(Italy) Andrea Pirlo
RM	8	(Italy) Gennaro Gattuso	(substituted off) 112'
LM	20	(Netherlands) Clarence Seedorf	(substituted off) 86'
AM	22	(Brazil) Kaká
CF	7	(Ukraine) Andriy Shevchenko
CF	11	(Argentina) Hernán Crespo	(substituted off) 85'
Substitutes:
GK	46	(Italy) Christian Abbiati
DF	4	(Georgia (country)) Kakha Kaladze
DF	5	(Italy) Alessandro Costacurta
MF	10	(Portugal) Rui Costa	(substituted on) 112'
MF	24	(France) Vikash Dhorasoo
MF	27	(Brazil) Serginho	(substituted on) 86'
FW	15	(Denmark) Jon Dahl Tomasson	(substituted on) 85'
Manager:
(Italy) Carlo Ancelotti

GK	1	(Poland) Jerzy Dudek
RB	3	(Republic of Ireland) Steve Finnan		(substituted off) 46'
CB	23	(England) Jamie Carragher	(yellow card) 75'
CB	4	(Finland) Sami Hyypiä
LB	21	(Mali) Djimi Traoré
DM	14	(Spain) Xabi Alonso
RM	10	(Spain) Luis García
CM	8	(England) Steven Gerrard (c)
LM	6	(Norway) John Arne Riise
SS	7	(Australia) Harry Kewell		(substituted off) 23'
CF	5	(Czech Republic) Milan Baroš	(yellow card) 81'	(substituted off) 85'
Substitutes:
GK	20	(England) Scott Carson
DF	17	(Spain) Josemi
MF	16	(Germany) Dietmar Hamann		(substituted on) 46'
MF	18	(Spain) Antonio Núñez
MF	25	(Croatia) Igor Bišćan
FW	9	(France) Djibril Cissé		(substituted on) 85'
FW	11	(Czech Republic) Vladimír Šmicer		(substituted on) 23'
Manager:
(Spain) Rafael Benítez

Man of the Match:
Steven Gerrard (Liverpool)

Assistant referees:
Clemente Plou (Spain)
Oscar Samaniego (Spain)
Fourth official:
Arturo Dauden Ibáñez (Spain)

Match rules

- 90 minutes
- 30 minutes of extra-time if necessary
- Penalty shoot-out if scores still level
- Seven named substitutes
- Maximum of three substitutions

=== Statistics ===
First half
Statistic	Milan	Liverpool
Goals scored	3	0
Total shots	7	5
Shots on target	5	1
Ball possession	56%	44%
Corner kicks	2	1
Fouls committed	8	7
Offsides	5	1
Yellow cards	0	0
Red cards	0	0

Second half and extra time
Statistic	Milan	Liverpool
Goals scored	0	3
Total shots	15	10
Shots on target	5	6
Ball possession	54%	46%
Corner kicks	8	3
Fouls committed	8	16
Offsides	2	4
Yellow cards	0	2
Red cards	0	0

Overall
Statistic	Milan	Liverpool
Goals scored	3	3
Total shots	22	15
Shots on target	10	7
Ball possession	55%	45%
Corner kicks	10	4
Fouls committed	16	23
Offsides	7	5
Yellow cards	0	2
Red cards	0	0

== Post-match ==
Liverpool have their hands on the European Cup again, and this time it's for keeps! That trophy isn't going anywhere but Anfield. Liverpool become only the third club in the history of the competition to win it five times, and earn the right to keep the cup forever.

— Clive Tyldesley commentary on ITV as Gerrard lifted the trophy.

Liverpool's triumph marked their fifth European Cup and the first by an English team since Manchester United had defeated Bayern Munich in the 1999 final in Barcelona. By winning the European Cup for a fifth time, Liverpool earned the privilege of wearing a multiple-winner badge and the right to keep the trophy (under normal competition rules, the winning club can keep the trophy for only 10 months, as they must deliver it to UEFA two months before the next year's final). Liverpool were given ownership of the trophy every winner had held aloft since 1995 (after Milan were permanently given the previous trophy after their fifth win in 1994). The 2005–06 participants competed for a new identical trophy. The rule to keep the trophy, which had been in effect since the 1968–69 season, was changed for the 2008–09 season so that the actual trophy remained with UEFA at all times. Liverpool became the fifth and final club to be given this honour after Real Madrid, Ajax, Bayern Munich and Milan – all of whom had either won at least five times or three times consecutively.

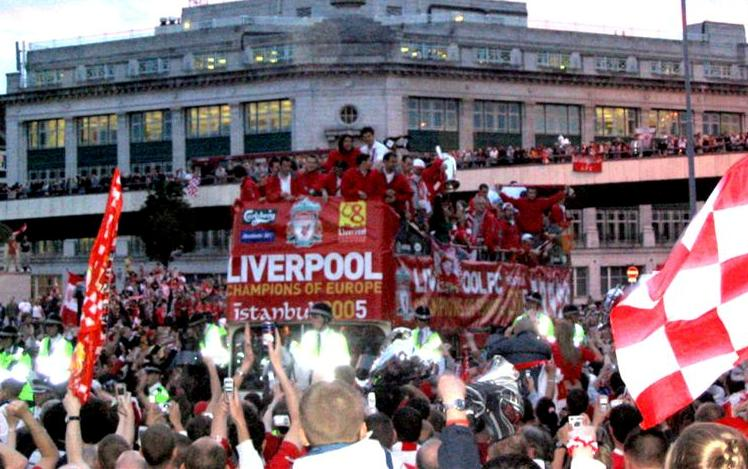
The Liverpool team parading the Champions League trophy in Liverpool city centre after their victory.

Liverpool celebrated their victory by parading the trophy around Liverpool in an open-top double-decker bus the day after the final. They were cheered by approximately 1 million supporters, with an estimated 300,000 fans located around St George's Hall – the final destination of the parade. Business experts estimated that one in five workers took time off following the victory. It was also estimated that Liverpudlians drank around 10,000 bottles of champagne after the match, with supermarket chain Sainsbury's stating: "We've never seen anything like it. We would usually expect to sell this much champagne at Christmas".

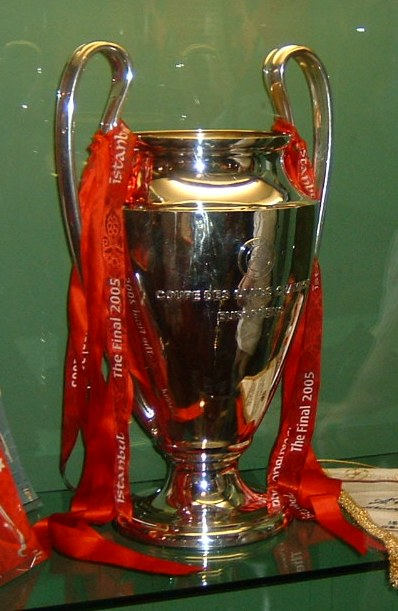
The UEFA Champions League trophy won by Liverpool in Istanbul, on display in the club's museum a few weeks after the match.

Liverpool manager Rafael Benítez admitted after the match that the manner of his side's victory had stunned him and he stated: "My problem is that I don't have words to express the things that I feel at this moment". Praise for Liverpool also came from outside England, including from Argentine legend Diego Maradona, who said, "Even the Brazil team that won the 1970 World Cup could not have staged a comeback with Milan leading 3–0... The English club proved that miracles really do exist. I've now made Liverpool my English team. They showed that football is the most beautiful sport of all. You knew they could defend, but the team showed they could play too and wrote a page in the history books. The match will last forever. The Liverpool supporters didn't let me go to sleep the night before. There were 10 of them to every three Milan supporters. They showed their unconditional support at half-time when they were losing 3–0 and still they didn't stop singing." Johan Cruyff similarly praised the supporters after the game, saying "There's not one club in Europe with an anthem like "You'll Never Walk Alone." There's not one club in the world so united with the fans. I sat there watching the Liverpool fans and they sent shivers down my spine. A mass of 40,000 people became one force behind their team".

Benítez was also prepared to break up his winning side after the final with a number of players expected to leave the club to make way for new arrivals. One of those leaving was Vladimír Šmicer, who had scored Liverpool's second goal in Istanbul, and whose contract was known not to be renewed before the final, meaning he entered knowing the final was his last game for the club. Milan were similarly astonished at the manner in which they had lost the final. Manager Carlo Ancelotti said, "We had six minutes of madness in which we threw away the position we had reached until then". The result compounded Milan's failure to win Serie A a week before the match. Milan's vice-president, Adriano Galliani, played down the loss, asserting: "Even if we come second in the league, and second in the Champions League, this is not a disastrous season for us". Captain Paolo Maldini was less optimistic, stating that the reverse was a "huge disappointment", but he added that Milan would accept the defeat and "go out with their heads high".

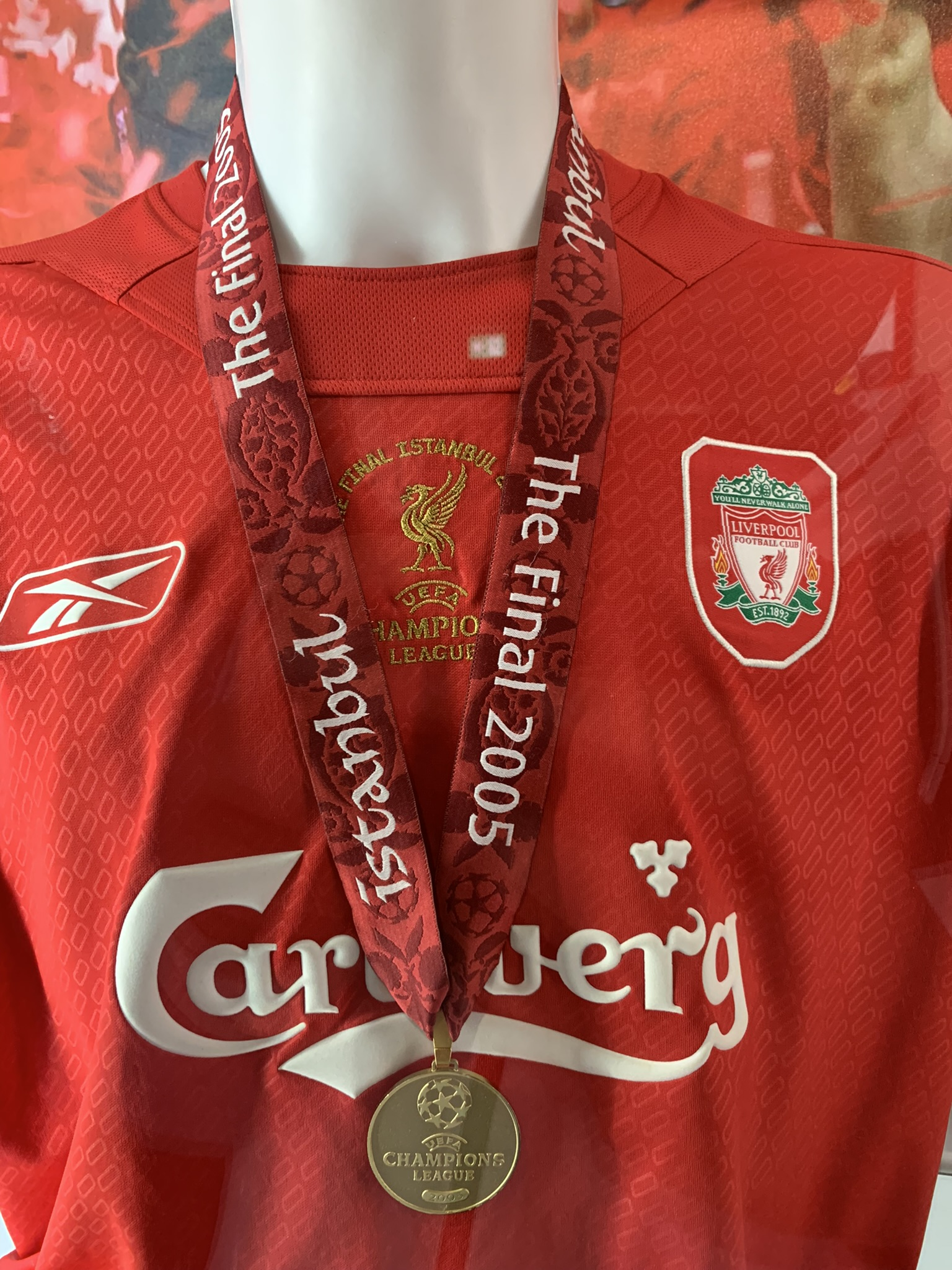
Liverpool shirt from the final and a winners medal in the club's museum

Much discussion after the final centered on the future of Liverpool captain Steven Gerrard who had been linked with a move to rivals Chelsea. Gerrard stated in the immediate aftermath of the victory, "How can I think of leaving Liverpool after a night like this?" Media reports then quoted Gerrard as saying he wished to leave Liverpool, citing events that had occurred in the month after the Champions League victory as the reason. On 6 July, however, Liverpool chief executive Rick Parry released a statement confirming that Gerrard would remain at the club, and Gerrard signed a new four-year contract on 8 July. He ultimately never played for another club in Europe, as he departed for the Los Angeles Galaxy of Major League Soccer a decade later.

Despite winning the competition and the precedent that the holders defend their trophy, Liverpool's place in next season's Champions League was still in doubt. Prior to the 2005 Champions League final, The Football Association (FA) of England had decided on 5 May that only the top four finishers in the Premier League would qualify and Liverpool ended their domestic season in fifth place behind Everton. The governing body of the competition UEFA initially maintained that each country could only have four Champions League spots and suggested that the FA could nominate Liverpool instead of Everton. Liverpool faced a three-week wait to discover if they would be allowed to defend their title as all previous winners of the competition had done. UEFA came to a decision on 10 June, confirming that both Everton and Liverpool would be able to compete in the Champions League qualifying rounds; however, Liverpool were entered into the first qualifying round, and were given no "country protection"; meaning they could face another English club at any stage of the competition. Liverpool were seeded meaning at the third qualifying round they could have faced the unseeded Everton (who ultimately faced Villarreal and were knocked out), while UEFA chief executive Lars-Christer Olsson said there was never any discussion of whether Liverpool should enter the competition as it was unanimous as holders they should. To ensure no repeat the UEFA Executive Committee also amended the regulations for future competitions so that the holders would have the right to defend their title automatically, though at the expense of the lowest placed team in those countries that had more than one qualifier.

As champions, Liverpool faced CSKA Moscow (winners of the 2005 UEFA Cup Final) in the 2005 UEFA Super Cup, held on 26 August. Liverpool won the match 3–1 after extra time. Liverpool's victory in Istanbul also meant they qualified for the 2005 FIFA Club World Championship. Liverpool beat Deportivo Saprissa 3–0 in the semi-final, and played Copa Libertadores champions São Paulo in the final, losing 1–0.

Both teams retained a number of players who played in this final for the rematch in the 2007 final in Athens, which Milan won 2–1. Many players who played in this game also played for their clubs' legends teams, Liverpool Legends and Milan Glorie, in Liverpool's 2019 Legends Game at Anfield; Robbie Fowler and Cissé put Liverpool 2–0 up before Pirlo and Giuseppe Pancaro brought Milan level. Gerrard then scored in the final minute of play to give Liverpool a 3–2 win. The match raised an estimated £1 million for the LFC Foundation.

It was the six minutes that shook the world. It was the six minutes that so stunned AC Milan that Carlo Ancelotti's devastated players threw away their losers' medals at the end. Orchestrated by the determination of Steven Gerrard, the tactical cunning of Rafa Benítez and the support of the fans who demanded that each player perform with pride in the shirt, these six minutes showed you should never give up. Even now, a familiar exhortation will go around Liverpool players or supporters when they walk through a storm. "Remember Istanbul".

— Henry Winter in The Telegraph (December 2009), Top 20 sporting moments of the decade: Liverpool's 'Miracle of Istanbul'.

In a 2011 poll conducted by UEFA.com, Dudek's double save from Shevchenko in the 117th minute was voted the greatest Champions League moment of all time, ahead of Zinedine Zidane's left-footed volley against Bayer Leverkusen in the 2002 final and Ole Gunnar Solskjær's injury-time winner against Bayern Munich in 1999 for Manchester United. On the second save from inside 3 yards, Dudek wrote in his autobiography: "They called the 2005 Champions League final the 'Miracle of Istanbul'. Well, this was my miracle. The save of my career. Of my life." When asked to explain his saves after the game, an emotional Dudek said he took inspiration from Pope John Paul II (a fellow Pole and goalkeeper in his youth) who died in April, the month before the final. "I'm dedicating this to the memory of John Paul. I had contact with him during his life and I've felt the inspiration since his death. I can't account for it." Dudek dubbed it the "Hand of Pope", an allusion to Diego Maradona dubbing his infamous first goal in the 1986 World Cup quarter final the "Hand of God".

== In popular culture ==
The 2014 British comedy movie One Night in Istanbul is set in Istanbul on the night of the final, and includes some footage from the match.

The 2011 British sports drama Will (starring Liverpool fan Damian Lewis) centres on the trials and tribulations in the lives of two main fictional characters: eleven-year-old Will Brennan and Bosnian footballer Alek, and their trek to see Liverpool play Milan in the 2005 Champions League final.

The final is discussed in author John Green's podcast The Anthropocene Reviewed, and the essay was later adapted for Green's book of the same name.

The final is an important shared memory between the main characters of the 2017 Korean romantic drama series Rain or Shine.

== See also ==
- 2007 UEFA Champions League final – contested by same teams
- 2005 UEFA Cup final
- 2005 UEFA Women's Cup final
- 2004–05 Liverpool F.C. season
- 2004–05 AC Milan season
- AC Milan in international football
- Liverpool F.C. in international football
