= Antonio Núñez (footballer) =

Spanish footballer (born 1979)

Personal information
- Full name: Antonio Núñez Tena
- Date of birth: 15 January 1979 (age 47)
- Place of birth: Madrid, Spain
- Height: 1.83 m (6 ft 0 in)
- Position: Midfielder

Senior career*
Years	Team	Apps	(Gls)
1998–1999	San Federico		
1999–2001	Las Rozas		
2001–2003	Real Madrid B	64	(12)
2003–2004	Real Madrid	11	(1)
2004–2005	Liverpool	18	(0)
2005–2008	Celta	96	(7)
2008–2009	Murcia	35	(1)
2009–2012	Apollon Limassol	60	(7)
2012–2013	Huesca	55	(6)
2013–2014	Deportivo La Coruña	22	(0)
2014–2018	Recreativo	136	(14)
Total		497	(48)
- * Club domestic league appearances and goals

Antonio Núñez Tena (born 15 January 1979) is a Spanish former professional footballer who played as a right midfielder.

His early career included spells at Real Madrid and Liverpool, on the fringes of both teams. Much of the rest of his career was spent in the Segunda División, while he also played three years for Apollon Limassol in Cyprus.

== Club career ==
=== Real Madrid ===
Born in Madrid, Núñez started his career with San Federico, before joining Tercera División team Las Rozas. In 2001, he moved to Real Madrid, his favourite club growing up.

Courtesy of manager Carlos Queiroz, Núñez was promoted to the main squad for the 2003–04 season. On 2 September 2003, in his La Liga debut, he came on as a substitute for Javier Portillo 15 minutes from time in an away game against Villarreal and scored the 1–1 equaliser after just seven minutes; for the remainder of the campaign, however, in which the Merengues came up totally empty, he only made a further ten league appearances, all from the bench.

=== Liverpool ===
In August 2004, Núñez was transferred to Liverpool, becoming Rafael Benítez's second signing as manager – after compatriot Josemi – as part of an exchange deal that saw Michael Owen go in the opposite direction for £8 million. He injured his knee in his first day of training for the Reds, and was out of action for three months. He made his Premier League debut on 28 November, playing 21 minutes in a 2–1 win over Arsenal.

Núñez scored his first and only goal for Liverpool in the 3–2 loss against Chelsea in the final of the Football League Cup, therefore becoming the only player in the club's history to score his only goal for the team in a major cup final. In his only season, he also won a UEFA Champions League medal, as he was one of the substitutes in the final against AC Milan (although he did not play).

=== Celta and later years ===
Following a disappointing season, Núñez transferred back to Spain and joined newly-promoted side Celta de Vigo on 26 July 2005. During his three-year spell with the Galicians, where he would be heavily played, he also lived one top-flight relegation, and joined Real Murcia in the summer of 2008.

In August 2009, Núñez bought out the remainder of his Murcia contract and was released, shortly after joining Cyprus' Apollon Limassol. After three seasons, he returned to his country and its Segunda División, signing a one-and-a-half-year deal with Huesca. After the team's relegation in 2013, he remained in the division by agreeing to a four-month contract at Deportivo de La Coruña on 12 September; he was part of the squad that returned to the top tier after one year, but started only seven matches and did not score once.

On 8 July 2014, Núñez signed a one-year deal at Recreativo de Huelva, scoring five times in his first season as the team descended to Segunda División B. In April 2016, he spoke to Diario AS about the club's financial emergency that was threatening its existence.

== Career statistics ==
Club performance			League		Cup		League Cup		Continental		Total	
Season	Club	League	Apps	Goals	Apps	Goals	Apps	Goals	Apps	Goals	Apps	Goals
Spain			League		Copa del Rey		Supercopa de España		Europe		Total	
2003–04	Real Madrid	La Liga	11	1	2	0	0	0	0	0	13	1
England			League		FA Cup		League Cup		Europe		Total	
2004–05	Liverpool	Premier League	18	0	1	0	3	1	5	0	27	1
Spain			League		Copa del Rey		Supercopa de España		Europe		Total	
2005–06	Celta	La Liga	32	2	1	0	0	0	0	0	33	2
2006–07	Celta	La Liga	24	0	2	0	0	0	7	1	33	1
2007–08	Celta	Segunda División	40	5	0	0	0	0	0	0	40	5
2008–09	Murcia	Segunda División	35	1	2	0	0	0	0	0	37	1
2008–09	Apollon Limassol	Cypriot First Division	17	1	0	0	0	0	0	0	17	1
2009–10	Apollon Limassol	Cypriot First Division	26	3	1	0	0	0	0	0	27	3
2010–11	Apollon Limassol	Cypriot First Division	17	3	1	0	2	0	0	0	20	3
2011–12	Huesca	Segunda División	16	4	1	0	0	0	0	0	17	4
2012–13	Huesca	Segunda División	39	2	1	0	0	0	0	0	40	2
2013–14	Deportivo	Segunda División	22	0	1	0	0	0	0	0	23	0
Total	Spain		219	15								
Total	England		18	0								
Total	Cyprus		60	7								
Career total			297	22								

== Honours ==
Liverpool

- UEFA Champions League: 2004–05
- Football League Cup runner-up: 2004–05

Apollon Limassol

- Cypriot Cup: 2009–10
