= Liverpool F.C.–Manchester United F.C. rivalry =

Rivalry between English association football clubs

Liverpool F.C. v Manchester United F.C.
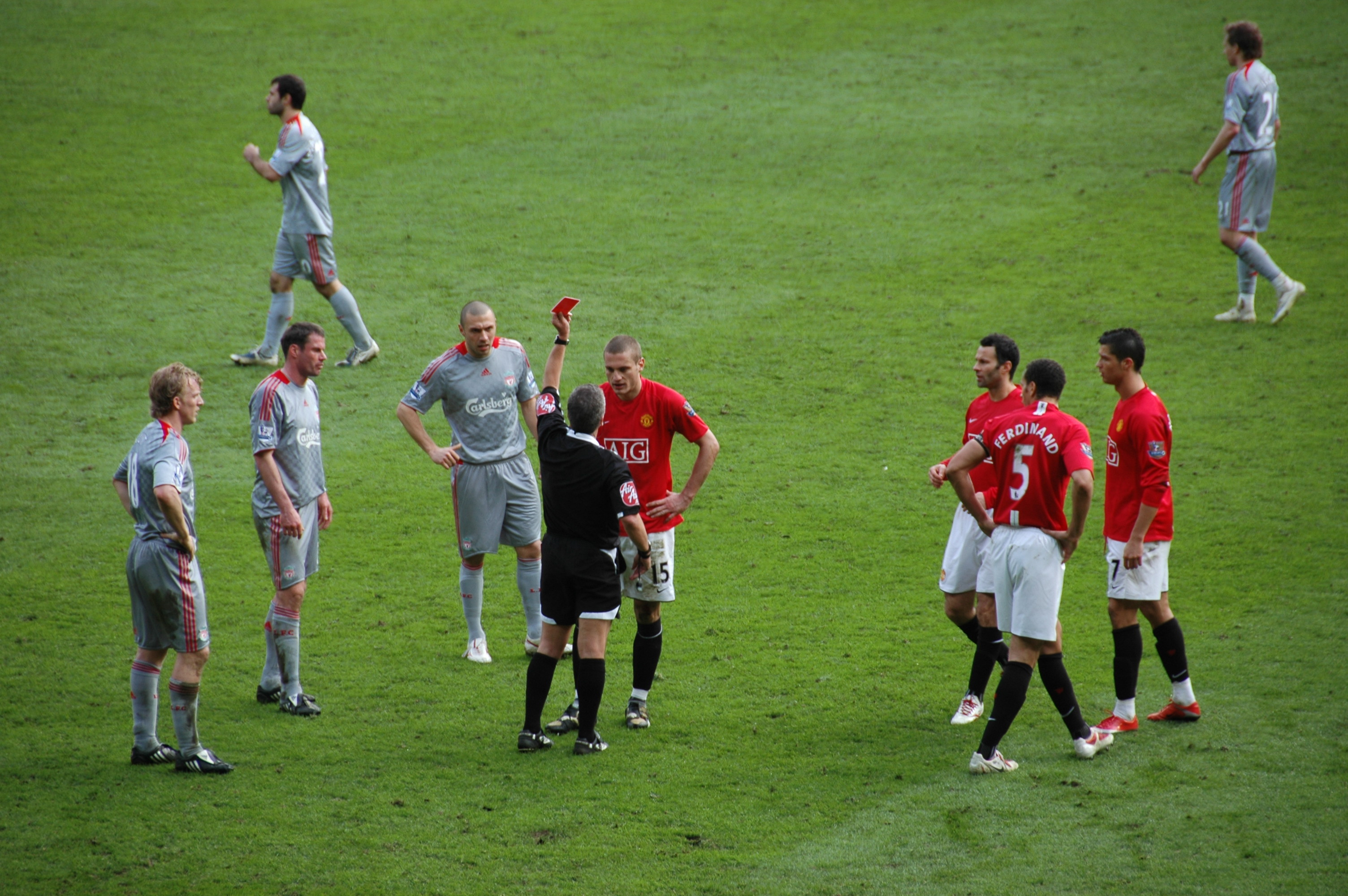
- Nemanja Vidić of Manchester United being sent off in a Premier League match against Liverpool on 14 March 2009
- Location: North West England
- Teams: Liverpool; Manchester United
- First meeting: 28 April 1894; Football League test match Liverpool 2–0 Newton Heath
- Latest meeting: 22 November 2026; Premier League; Liverpool 4–0 Manchester United
- Next meeting: 24 January 2027; Premier League; Manchester United v Liverpool
- Stadiums: Anfield (Liverpool); Old Trafford (Manchester United)

Statistics
- Total meetings: 219
- Most wins: Manchester United (85)
- Most player appearances: Ryan Giggs (48, Manchester United)
- Top scorer: Mohamed Salah (16, Liverpool)
- All-time series: Liverpool: 73; Drawn: 61; Manchester United: 85
- Largest victory: Liverpool 7–0 Manchester United; Premier League (5 March 2023)
- Largest goal scoring: Liverpool 7–4 Manchester United; First Division (25 March 1908)
- Longest win streak: 5 games Liverpool (2000–2002)
- Longest unbeaten streak: 13 games Liverpool (1919–1927)
- Current win streak: 1 game Liverpool (2026–present)
- Current unbeaten streak: 1 game Liverpool (2026–present)

The Liverpool F.C.–Manchester United F.C. rivalry, sometimes referred to as the Northwest derby, is a high-profile inter-city rivalry between English professional association football clubs Liverpool and Manchester United. It is considered one of the biggest fixtures in English football and one of the biggest and fiercest rivalries in world football. Players, fans and the media consider the fixture between the two clubs to be their biggest rivalry, above even their own local derbies, with Everton and Manchester City respectively.

The rivalry has been fuelled by the proximity of the two major cities that they represent, their historic economic and industrial rivalry, significant periods of domestic footballing dominance and European success, and their popularity at home and abroad, as two of the biggest-earning and widely supported football clubs in the world.

The two clubs are the most successful in the history of English football and among the most decorated in the world; between them they have won 40 league titles, 21 FA Cups, 16 League Cups, 37 FA Community Shields, nine European Cups/UEFA Champions Leagues, four UEFA Cups, one UEFA Cup Winners' Cup, five UEFA Super Cups, one Intercontinental Cup and two FIFA Club World Cups. As of 3 May 2026, Liverpool lead in terms of number of trophies won with 69 to United's 68, while United lead in the head-to-head record between the two teams with 85 wins to Liverpool's 72; the remaining 61 matches have finished as draws.

Neither of the two, as well as Arsenal, Chelsea, Everton, and Tottenham, have been relegated from the Premier League, the current top-tier league serving as the highest level of the English football pyramid.

== Inter-city rivals ==
The Liverpool coat of arms features the mythical bird known as the 'Liver' bird. It is believed to be based on a cormorant. This creature formed the basis of the Liverpool FC badge.

The Manchester coat of arms formed the foundation of the original Manchester United badge.

The cities of Liverpool and Manchester are located in the north west of England, 35 miles (56 km) apart. Since the Industrial Revolution, there has been a consistent rivalry between the two cities based on economic and industrial competition. Manchester through to the 18th century was the far more populous city and was considered representative of the north. By the late 18th century, Liverpool had grown as a major seaport – critical to the growth and success of the northern cotton mills. Over the next century, Liverpool grew to supersede Manchester and throughout the late 19th and early 20th century was often described as the British Empire's second city. The links between the two cities were strengthened with the construction of the Bridgewater Canal, the Mersey and Irwell Navigation and the world's first inter-city railway, the Liverpool and Manchester Railway, for the transport of raw materials inland.

The construction of the Manchester Ship Canal, funded by Manchester merchants, was opposed by Liverpool politicians and bred resentment between the two cities. Tensions between working-class Liverpool dockers and labourers in Manchester was heightened after its completion in 1894, just three months before the first meeting between Liverpool and Newton Heath (as United were called at the time) in a play-off match that would see Newton Heath relegated to the Second Division.

Today, the crests of both the city of Manchester and Manchester United include stylised ships representing the Manchester Ship Canal and Manchester's trade roots. The ship is also included on the crest of many other Mancunian institutions such as the Manchester City Council.

Post-war shifts in economic ties, reliance on regional coal and shifts in transatlantic trade patterns caused by the growth of Asian labour markets caused the gradual decline of British manufacturing. Both Liverpool and Manchester suffered the loss of their primary sources of income. With Liverpool, the switch from North American to continental European and Asian shipping routes tended to benefit southern English ports, while Manchester suffered from the expansion of the Asian textile industry. This reversal of fortunes happened against the backdrop of shifting political backgrounds and significant events in British culture and society in the second half of the 20th century.

Both cities were part of the county of Lancashire until 1974, with the enactment of the Local Government Act 1972. Since then, Liverpool and Manchester respectively anchor the neighbouring metropolitan counties of Merseyside and Greater Manchester.

The two cities continue to be strong regional rivals. Their continued importance to the UK economy has been reflected with the awarding of the 2002 Commonwealth Games to Manchester, while Liverpool was awarded the title of 2008 European Capital of Culture as part of its regeneration.

More recent projects by Peel Ports have sought to re-establish the economic links between the Port of Liverpool and Port of Manchester, including re-developing trade links via the Manchester Ship Canal.

== Football rivals ==
=== Formation to 1945 ===
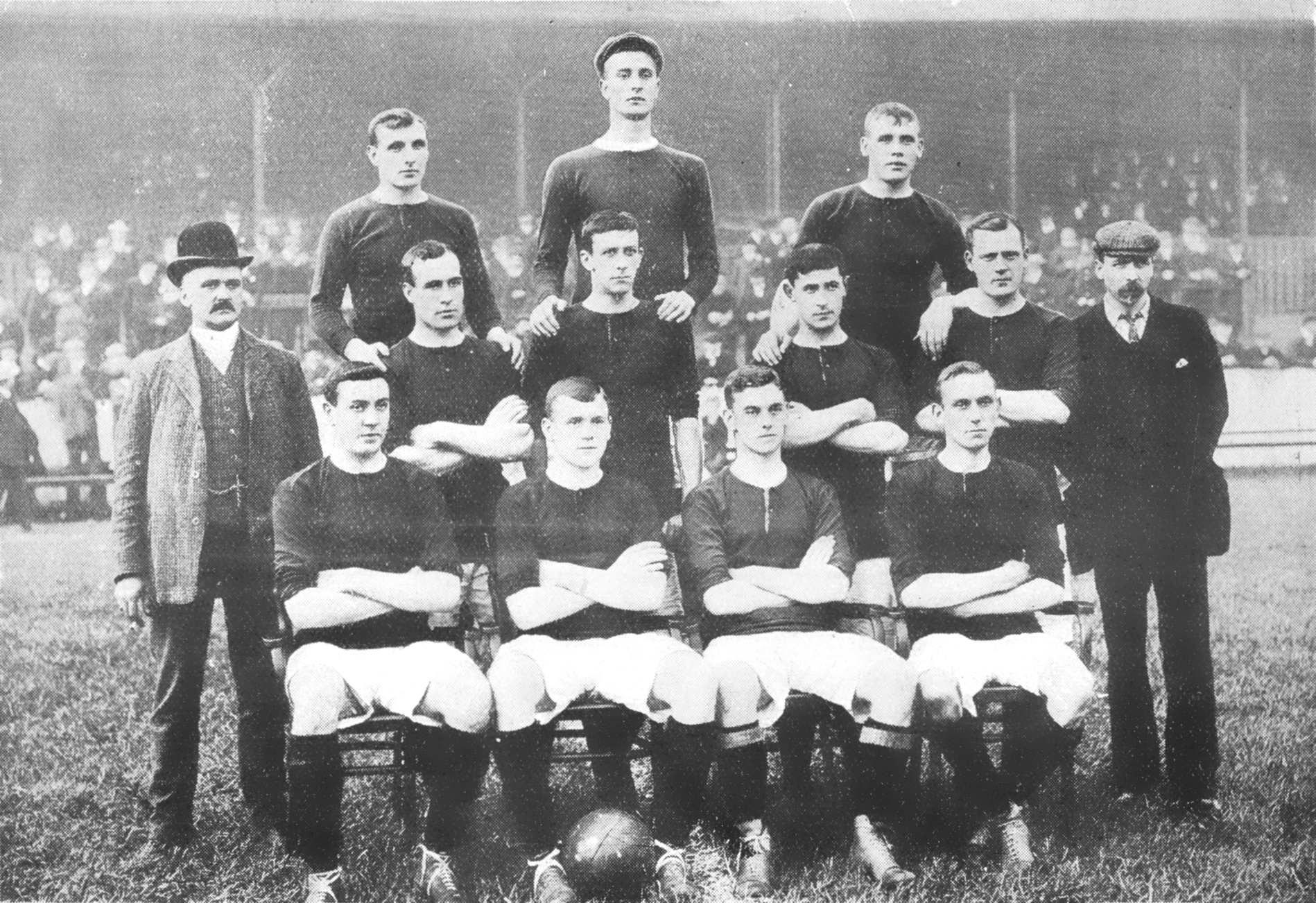
The Manchester United team at the start of the 1905–06 season

Manchester United F.C. was formed in Newton Heath in 1878 as Newton Heath LYR F.C., and played their first competitive match in October 1886, when they entered the first round of the 1886–87 FA Cup.

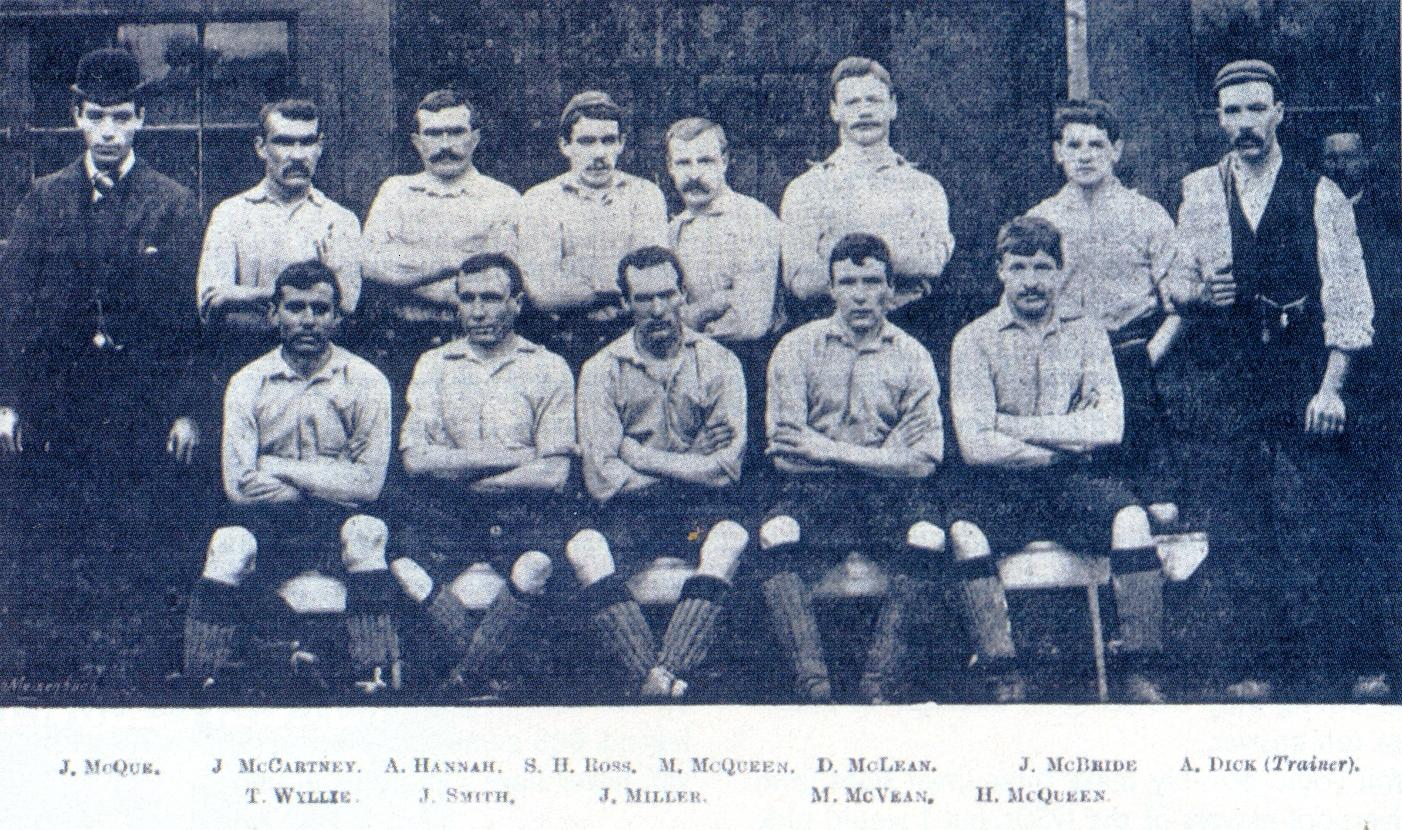
Liverpool's team during its first season, 1892–93

Liverpool F.C. was formed in 1892 following a disagreement between the board of Everton and club president John Houlding, who owned the club's ground, Anfield. The disagreement between the two parties over rent resulted in Everton moving to Goodison Park from Anfield, and Houlding founded Liverpool F.C. to play in the vacated stadium. Liverpool supporters often sing the chant 'You should have paid the rent' to Everton fans during matches between the two sides, to reflect this.

Liverpool's first season was in the Second Division in 1893. The team went undefeated all season, winning the title and being put up for election to the First Division, which would see them play a one-off test match against the bottom side of the First Division for their place. The team that Liverpool were to face was Newton Heath, whom they beat 2–0 to take their place in the first tier.

Liverpool won their first Football League Championship trophy in 1901 and followed it up in 1906, the same season that saw the newly renamed Manchester United promoted to the top flight after finishing as Second Division runners-up behind Bristol City. Two seasons later, by which time Liverpool had fallen into mid-table, Manchester United secured their first league title, winning the 1907–08 Football League nine points clear of Aston Villa and Manchester City. They followed this up by winning the first-ever FA Charity Shield match when they defeated Queens Park Rangers over two legs in 1908. The following season, they won the 1909 FA Cup Final, and followed this up with another league title and Charity Shield in 1911.

The outbreak of World War I disrupted domestic football, and following the resumption of competitions in 1919 Liverpool asserted themselves on domestic football with a brace of league Championships while United found themselves in steep decline that saw them relegated in 1923. Between 1923 and the outbreak of World War II, neither team won any more competitive trophies other than regional trophies, with Manchester United spending three separate periods in the Second Division.

=== 1945 to 1992 ===
A comparative chart showing yearly table positions of Manchester United and Liverpool in the English football league system since 1892–93

After the Second World War, Liverpool again became English champions in 1947 before the clubs' roles reversed once more, with Manchester United finding stability under the management of former Liverpool captain Matt Busby, winning the FA Cup in 1948 and then three league titles and Charity Shields apiece in the 1950s, while the Merseysiders dropped into the second tier in 1954. During this time, future Liverpool manager Bill Shankly was approached by then Liverpool chairman Tom Williams and asked, "How would you like to manage the best club in the country?", to which Shankly replied, "Why? Is Matt Busby packing it in?"

Following Liverpool's promotion under Shankly in 1962, the two clubs found themselves in direct competition with each other for the first time, sharing four league titles between 1964 and 1967, as well as the 1965 FA Charity Shield. Following this period however, the two sides began to drift in opposite directions once more. United's title victory of 1967 would be their last for 26 years, while Liverpool would enjoy 19 years of sustained success, winning 11 league titles, 19 domestic cups and seven European trophies from 1973 to 1992. United's main reprieves during this time came through cup competitions, such as their triumphs over the Merseysiders in the 1977 FA Cup final and the 1979 FA Cup semi-final replay at Goodison Park. It was during this period, in the late 1970s and early 1980s, that the modern-day rivalry between the two clubs truly began to develop. According to football sociologist John Williams, Manchester United had developed a "glamour and media profile" but didn't have the success to match it, while Liverpool fans felt the Red Devils were "media darlings who got far too much publicity". There was a perception in Liverpool that their hugely successful but "professional" and "workmanlike" teams were always somehow in the shadow of the stars at Old Trafford. This led to a derisory nickname for United in Liverpool: "The Glams".

=== 1992–present ===
Manchester United's 26-year spell without a league title was replicated and exceeded by Liverpool from 1990 to 2020, during which time United dominated English football and won 13 league titles, 23 domestic cups and five European trophies. Liverpool's success in domestic competitions such as the 2003 League Cup and 2006 FA Cup, as well as European competitions like the 2005 and 2019 Champions Leagues, allowed them some consolation during their league title dry spell, which finally ended in 2020.

Despite their contrasting fortunes, only eight times since 1972 have neither Liverpool nor United finished in the top two of the league table – in 1980–81, 2003–04, 2004–05, 2014–15, 2015–16, 2016–17, 2022–23 and 2023–24 – and in seven of those eight campaigns, silverware was still taken home by one of the two clubs; Liverpool paraded the European Cup and League Cup in 1981, while Manchester United lifted the FA Community Shield and FA Cup in the 2004 season and Liverpool claimed the Champions League in 2005. United brought home the FA Cup again in 2016, won a treble of trophies consisting of the Community Shield, League Cup and UEFA Europa League in 2016–17, won the League Cup again in 2023 and brought back the FA Cup in 2024.

== Managers ==
=== Notable managers ===
If you are first you are first. If you are second you are nothing.

— Bill Shankly

While Liverpool and Manchester United's successes are almost identical in number, their systems of achieving these successes vary considerably. Liverpool built their dominance on a dynasty known as the Anfield Boot Room. The boot room itself was where strategy for future matches was planned, however, it became a breeding ground for future Liverpool managers following the arrival of Bill Shankly in 1959. The original members were Shankly himself, Bob Paisley, Joe Fagan and Reuben Bennett, although the likes of Kenny Dalglish joined later on. Shankly laid down principles which subsequent Boot Room graduates retained and developed: the club adopted a back four sooner than most and played a game based on possession, pushing high and pressing.

Following Shankly's retirement in 1974, having secured eight trophies in 15 years, Bob Paisley stepped into the vacant manager's position and amassed 20 trophies in nine seasons. Following his retirement, Joe Fagan took over and in the first of two seasons at the club, won a treble of trophies. Kenny Dalglish was accepted into the group as the next in line for the role of manager, and he combined it with his playing duties to win Liverpool 10 trophies. The boot room connection was finally broken in 1991, 32 years after Shankly's arrival, with the appointment of former Liverpool player Graeme Souness, who demolished the original boot room itself to make way for a press room. It did still manage to produce a final Liverpool manager in Roy Evans, who won the League Cup in 1995, but upon his resignation in 1998, the era was over. Liverpool have gone on to achieve success with managers outside of the dynasty since then, most notably under Rafael Benítez, who won the UEFA Champions League in 2005, and Jürgen Klopp, who won it in 2019 before going on to win the club's first league title in 30 years in 2019–20. Klopp's gegenpressing strategy has been described as a modern development of the classic Liverpool style.

My greatest challenge was knocking Liverpool right off their fucking perch, and you can print that.

— Alex Ferguson in response to an Alan Hansen comment in 2002

By contrast, the vast majority of Manchester United's success has come in three separate eras in the club's history, under three different managers. Out of the club's 68 trophies, 56 were won under the management of Ernest Mangnall, Sir Matt Busby and Sir Alex Ferguson. Mangnall was the club's first great manager, winning five trophies in three years from 1908–11. Following his departure to local rivals Manchester City a year later, it was not until Busby's arrival 33 years later that the club would be on the trophy trail again. Busby became United's second most decorated manager of all time (ironically as an ex-Liverpool player and captain), winning 13 trophies at the club, including the 1968 European Cup, which saw an English team secure European football's top prize for the first time. After Busby's retirement in 1969 however, Manchester United saw their fortunes slip and the club struggled to stay successful until Alex Ferguson's arrival in 1986, a 17-year period in which United won only three FA Cups and two Charity Shields. It was under Ferguson that United regained their glory days, winning 38 trophies during his 26-year tenure to scale the pinnacles of both English and European football.

== Players ==
=== Players' rivalry ===
A mate owned a [Manchester United captain] Bryan Robson top. We were kicking about, and I asked if I could be Robbo for a while. My dad looked out and went ballistic. He wasn't having his kid dragging the Gerrard name through the gutter. I thought we'd have to move!

— Steven Gerrard

The rivalry has extended to the players as well: Wayne Rooney, a product of Liverpool's city rivals Everton who played for United from 2004 to 2017, described how he grew up hating the Reds (Liverpool), while Liverpool's Steven Gerrard took a film crew on tour of his home where he showed off a collection of football shirts he had swapped with opposing players as part of the after-match routine; he pointed out that there were no Manchester United shirts in there and he would never have one of them in his house. Former Liverpool goalkeeper David James said: "I could never say I hated any United players just for being United players... But the rivalry became a habit, I suppose; on England trips Liverpool lads would eat at one table, United boys at another. There was tension there and we avoided one other". Liverpool defender Neil Ruddock once broke both of United forward Andy Cole's legs in a reserve match, later saying that "I didn’t meant to break both legs, I only meant to break one... I absolutely destroyed him... I know it's not big and it's not clever but it was great".

Manchester United's Gary Neville has been vocal about his dislike of Liverpool. He notably drew the ire of Liverpool fans during the 2006 match at Old Trafford when he celebrated Rio Ferdinand's last-gasp winner by running to the stand where the away fans were seated while kissing the crest on his jersey and appearing to shout angrily towards them; he was fined and given a two-match ban by The Football Association but has stated on several occasions that he has never regretted his actions. Neville was regularly subjected to offensive chants from Liverpool supporters afterwards. In a Manchester derby during the 2003–04 season, Neville was sent off after attempting to headbutt Manchester City's ex-Liverpool midfielder Steve McManaman; as Paul Scholes commented, "It's fair to say the pair of them never got on too well together".

In a retrospective special leading up to the January 2017 match at Old Trafford, Neville and his fellow Monday Night Football pundit and retired Liverpool one-club man Jamie Carragher both acknowledged that it was not uncommon for both United and Liverpool players, particularly locally born youth academy graduates such as Bury-born Neville and Merseyside natives Gerrard and Robbie Fowler, to celebrate in front of rival fans and that "you just got to take it on the chin". Neville hinted that the rivalry is as much about shared values when criticising both clubs' involvement in the aborted European Super League in 2021: “I value the history and tradition that runs through those … clubs. … I don’t like them, they don’t like me, but you know one thing I always thought about them? They were honest, they had integrity, they would look after their people; they would look after their own.”

I can't stand Liverpool, I can't stand the people, I can't stand anything to do with them.

— Gary Neville

In the 2011–12 season's first league meeting of the season at Anfield, United defender Patrice Evra accused Liverpool striker Luis Suárez of racially abusing him. After considering the evidence, an FA panel found that Suárez had referred to Evra using the term "negrito" seven times (Suárez himself admitted to having done so once, but denied racism); he was banned for eight games. This included the FA Cup fourth-round tie between the two clubs (again at Anfield), which Liverpool won. 24 hours after Suarez was found guilty of racial abuse, the Liverpool players and manager wore shirts to support Suárez.

On 11 February 2012, United and Liverpool met again at Old Trafford, and Suárez played for Liverpool for the first time since his ban. Before kick-off, the two teams were expected to shake hands, but Suárez ignored Evra's offered hand and moved onto the next United player in line, David de Gea. The player after De Gea, Rio Ferdinand, then rejected Suárez's handshake. United went on to win 2–1 and Evra celebrated in front of the home supporters, with Suárez close by. Sir Alex Ferguson declared Suárez to be a "disgrace" and suggested that he should not be allowed to play for Liverpool again. Kenny Dalglish said he had not seen the missed handshake. The following day, Suárez, Dalglish and Liverpool all issued statements of apology for the handshake incident, which United accepted.

Liverpool's vice-captain for the 2011–12 season, Jamie Carragher, later apologised to Evra in 2019 for wearing shirts in support of Suarez, saying '"There's no doubt we made a massive mistake. I'm not lying on that and saying I wasn't part of it because as the club we got it wrong and I was vice-captain. I'm not sure who was actually behind it". Similarly in 2020 Jordan Henderson, a young Liverpool player at the time of the incident who went on to captain the club, stated in an interview for a BBC documentary on football and racism that he was "not sure the club or everybody dealt with it in the best way. From a player point of view, our mindset was on Luis and how to protect him, but really we didn't really think about Patrice. I think that's where we got it wrong from top to bottom".

=== Player transfers ===
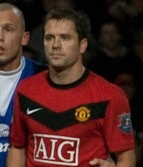
Michael Owen is the most recent player to play for both clubs.

Since the 1964 transfer of Phil Chisnall from United to Liverpool, no player has been transferred directly between the two clubs. Some players, however, have played for both clubs but played elsewhere between each tenure, such as Paul Ince (playing for Inter Milan in between), Peter Beardsley (Vancouver Whitecaps and Newcastle United) and more recently Michael Owen (Real Madrid and Newcastle United). Although Beardsley only played once for United, he went on to be a key player during his four years at Liverpool.

In 2007, there was a bid from Liverpool to sign Gabriel Heinze from United, but United refused to allow him to join their biggest rivals due to the ongoing feud. United claimed that it was agreed Heinze would only join a foreign club if he chose to leave. Heinze went public with his request to join Liverpool which was seen as the ultimate betrayal by the Manchester United fans. The Manchester United fans who once chanted "Argentina" in honour of the player then turned their backs on him. Heinze was eventually sold to Real Madrid instead. In 2019, after Swedish striker Zlatan Ibrahimović left LA Galaxy, Liverpool manager Jürgen Klopp said that he might have considered signing Ibrahimović had he not previously played for Manchester United.

Date	Player	From	To	Fee
August 1912	Tom Chorlton	Liverpool	Manchester United	
November 1913	Jackie Sheldon	Manchester United	Liverpool	
September 1920	Tom Miller	Liverpool	Manchester United	£2,000
May 1921	Fred Hopkin	Manchester United	Liverpool	
February 1929	Tommy Reid	Liverpool	Manchester United	
January 1938	Ted Savage	Liverpool	Manchester United	
November 1938	Allenby Chilton	Liverpool	Manchester United	
February 1954	Thomas McNulty	Manchester United	Liverpool	£7,000
April 1964	Phil Chisnall	Manchester United	Liverpool	£25,000

== Supporters ==
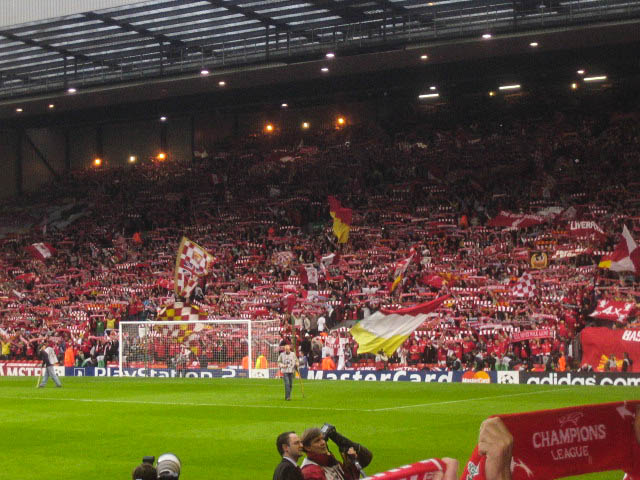
Liverpool Kopites in The Kop stand at Anfield

Both Manchester United and Liverpool are among the most popular football clubs (and sporting organisations) globally. Both are in the top 10 in Europe. Manchester United states that its worldwide fan base includes more than 320 officially recognised branches of the Manchester United Supporters Club (MUSC) in at least 90 countries. Liverpool states that its worldwide fan base also includes more than 300 officially recognised branches of the Official LFC Supporters Clubs (OLSCs) in over 100 countries. Notable groups include Spirit of Shankly.

The 2005 leveraged takeover of Manchester United by the Glazer family created a schism amongst Manchester fans, directly causing the creation of F.C. United of Manchester, and the "Love United Hate Glazer" movement, and subsequently the Red Knights who attempted to buy the Glazers out the club. Two years later, Liverpool went through its own controversial takeover when Chairman David Moores sold the club to American businessmen George Gillett and Tom Hicks. Disagreements between Gillett and Hicks, and the lack of popular support from fans, resulted in the pair looking to sell the club. Martin Broughton was appointed chairman of the club on 16 April 2010 to oversee its sale. Court action finally forced the sale of the club to Fenway Sports Group.

=== Hooliganism ===
With the rise of football hooliganism across English football during the 1970s and 1980s, matches between the two clubs brought some minor and major incidents of hooliganism. Since then, the modern game has seen a decrease in violence between the rival supporters and incidents are fairly uncommon. This is more likely due to an increase in Police presence and CCTV with huge steps taken to keep the fans separated. To this day, both sets of fans still hold resentment toward each other. As well as physical violence, sections of the clubs' fan bases often taunt each other with unsavoury chants about the Munich air disaster and the Hillsborough disaster respectively.

At the 1996 FA Cup final, an unidentified Liverpool fan spat at Eric Cantona and threw a punch at Alex Ferguson as a victorious Manchester United team walked up the steps at Wembley Stadium to collect the trophy from the Royal Box.

The 2006 FA Cup match at Anfield featured foreign objects thrown at United fans by Liverpool supporters, including human excrement. Liverpool's FA Cup semi-final game against Chelsea at Old Trafford later that year also resulted in damage to the stadium, including graffiti about serial killer Harold Shipman.

In March 2011, an FA Youth Cup game between the two clubs was marred because of "sick chants" about Hillsborough and Heysel coming from the Manchester United fans at Anfield. Former Liverpool striker John Aldridge was at the game and told the Liverpool Echo that "the level of abuse was absolutely sickening".

In March 2016, before Liverpool's first leg tie at Anfield against Manchester United in the UEFA Europa League, it was reported that a group of Liverpool fans hung a "Manc Bastards" banner on the M62, as 2,300 Manchester United supporters made the trip to Anfield. It was confiscated by the police, shortly after. Liverpool won the match 2–0. Before the second leg tie at Old Trafford, Liverpool fans were greeted with a banner on the M62 in Salford that said 'murderers' and also had the Hillsborough disaster's date on it. UEFA took no disciplinary action against Manchester United. During the same game, there were reported crowd disturbances, coming from the Manchester United end. It was later reported that a Liverpool supporter snuck a Liverpool banner into the United section, aggravating United supporters in the stands. Liverpool supporters ripped out seats, and supporters threw objects at each other, also fighting with United supporters. Liverpool were fined £43,577 by UEFA for setting off flares and fireworks in the crowd, as well as the singing of "illicit chants", while Manchester United were fined £44,342 for illicit chants and the throwing of objects. £15,290 of each club's fine was suspended for two years. The match was drawn 1–1 and Liverpool progressed to the quarter-finals against Borussia Dortmund.

In August 2022, ITV reported that some Manchester United fans attacked a bus en route to Old Trafford, in the belief it was transporting the Liverpool team or fans; it was actually carrying children who supported Manchester United.

In May 2023, shortly after the FA Cup final between Manchester United and Manchester City, a photograph emerged online of a United supporter wearing a kit with the words "Not Enough" and the number 97 printed on the back, a mockery of the Hillsborough disaster. The supporter was later identified and arrested following the attention the photo received, and was fined £1000 and given a 4-year ban from attending regulated football games.

== Significant games ==
=== 1894 test match ===
The first-ever meeting between both clubs came in a Football League test match in 1894, a post-season series to determine who would receive First Division membership for 1894–95. As Newton Heath finished bottom of the First Division at the end of 1893–94, they had to play off against the champions of the Second Division, Liverpool. Liverpool won the tie 2–0 at Ewood Park in Blackburn, earning them First Division membership and condemning Newton Heath to the Second Division.

=== 1977 FA Cup final ===
In 1977, the two clubs met in a cup final for the first time, when they reached the final of the FA Cup. The two clubs took to the field at Wembley on 21 May, with Liverpool having just won the league title, knowing that winning this game would put them on course for a unique treble as they had the European Cup final to look forward to four days later. However, United ended Liverpool's treble dreams with a 2–1 win, with goals from Stuart Pearson and Jimmy Greenhoff, five minutes apart with a Jimmy Case goal for Liverpool in between.

=== 1983 Football League Cup final ===
Six years later, on 26 March 1983, the two sides met for the Football League Cup final. Goals from Alan Kennedy and Ronnie Whelan won the game 2–1 for Liverpool, after Norman Whiteside had given United the lead. Liverpool collected the trophy for the third year in succession. It was the last of Liverpool manager Bob Paisley's nine seasons in charge (during which Liverpool had dominated the English and European scene) before his retirement, and his players allowed him to climb the 39 steps to collect the trophy from the Royal Box.

=== Anfield 1988 ===
On 4 April 1988, Liverpool were 11 points ahead at the top of the league and almost certain of winning the First Division title with barely a month of the league season remaining. United, in their first full season under the management of Alex Ferguson, were their nearest rivals. The two sides took to the field for a league encounter at Anfield and with the second half just minutes old the home side had a 3–1 lead with goals from Peter Beardsley, Gary Gillespie and Steve McMahon, with United's only goal coming from Bryan Robson. Robson then pulled a goal back for United, and with 12 minutes remaining fellow midfielder Gordon Strachan equalised to force a 3–3 draw.

=== Other notable games ===
On 4 January 1994, in the second season of the new Premier League, United took a 3–0 lead at Anfield in the opening 25 minutes with goals from Steve Bruce, Ryan Giggs and Denis Irwin. Liverpool managed to claw back to draw 3–3 with two goals from Nigel Clough and another from Neil Ruddock. It was one of the last games in charge of Liverpool for manager Graeme Souness, who had resigned by the end of the month.

On 1 October 1995, United's Eric Cantona made his comeback to the side after serving an eight-month suspension for attacking a spectator in a game against Crystal Palace. His comeback game was against Liverpool in the Premier League at Old Trafford. United took an early lead through Nicky Butt, only for Liverpool's Robbie Fowler to score twice and give the visitors a 2–1 lead. However, United were awarded a penalty in the 71st minute and Cantona converted it successfully, forcing a 2–2 draw. At the end of the season, the two sides met again at Wembley for the FA Cup final. The game stayed goalless until the 85th minute, when Liverpool conceded a corner, which David Beckham swung into the box to be cleared by David James, only for Eric Cantona to fire home United's winner. In March 2003, the two clubs once again met in a cup final, this time in the League Cup, with Liverpool lifting the trophy after goals from Steven Gerrard and Michael Owen gave them a 2–0 win.

On 14 March 2009, the two sides met at Old Trafford in the Premier League. United were ahead at the top of the league and Liverpool were looking to make a late run to the title which had eluded them since 1990. United went ahead in the 23rd minute with a Cristiano Ronaldo penalty, but Fernando Torres equalised five minutes later for Liverpool, and a Steven Gerrard penalty just before half-time put Liverpool in the lead. United had Nemanja Vidić sent off in the 76th minute, and their misery was swiftly compounded by late goals from Fábio Aurélio and finally Andrea Dossena, condemning them to a 4–1 defeat, their heaviest at Old Trafford in any competition for 17 years. Despite the loss, Manchester United were crowned league champions for the third season in succession and equalled Liverpool's 18 league titles, with Liverpool finishing four points behind in second.

The league fixture on 11 February 2012 was marked by controversy regarding Liverpool striker Luis Suárez refusal to shake hands with Patrice Evra, following an eight-match suspension for racially abusing Evra in the previous meeting between the sides. Following the 2–1 victory for United after a brace from Wayne Rooney, Evra in turn controversially celebrated right in front of Suárez, and was swept aside by opposition players finding the gesture provocative.

In the 2015–16 season the two rivals faced each other for the first time on the European stage, in the round of 16 of the UEFA Europa League. Liverpool won the tie 3–1 on aggregate with a 2–0 victory at Anfield on 10 March 2016 and the sides drawing 1–1 at Old Trafford seven days later. Liverpool would go on to reach the final, losing 3–1 to Sevilla.

On 24 October 2021, Manchester United suffered their heaviest ever home defeat to Liverpool, as a Mohamed Salah hat-trick – the first by a Liverpool player at Old Trafford since Fred Howe in November 1936 – and goals from Naby Keïta and Diogo Jota gave Liverpool a 5–0 win in the 2021–22 Premier League. Salah's hat-trick was the first scored by an away team at Old Trafford since Ronaldo's in April 2003 and the first hat-trick scored there by an away team in the Premier League.

On 5 March 2023, Liverpool recorded their biggest ever competitive win against Manchester United with a 7–0 victory at Anfield. Cody Gakpo, Darwin Núñez and Mohamed Salah each scored a brace, with Roberto Firmino adding on a seventh. This surpassed their previous record set in October 1895, a 7–1 victory in the Second Division. This was also Manchester United's joint-biggest ever defeat and the heaviest since Wolverhampton Wanderers beat them by the same scoreline in 1931. Despite this result, Liverpool finished the season in fifth place, eight points behind third-placed Manchester United.

== Honours, head to head, and statistics ==
=== Honours ===
As of 27 April 2025

- Numbers with this background denote club holds record in the competition.

Domestic honours
Competition	Liverpool		Manchester United	
Competition	Titles	Year	Titles	Year
Premier League/First Division	20	1900–01, 1905–06, 1921–22, 1922–23, 1946–47, 1963–64, 1965–66, 1972–73, 1975–76, 1976–77, 1978–79, 1979–80, 1981–82, 1982–83, 1983–84, 1985–86, 1987–88, 1989–90, 2019–20, 2024–25	20	1907–08, 1910–11, 1951–52, 1955–56, 1956–57, 1964–65, 1966–67, 1992–93, 1993–94, 1995–96, 1996–97, 1998–99, 1999–2000, 2000–01, 2002–03, 2006–07, 2007–08, 2008–09, 2010–11, 2012–13
FA Cup	8	1964–65, 1973–74, 1985–86, 1988–89, 1991–92, 2000–01, 2005–06, 2021–22	13	1908–09, 1947–48, 1962–63, 1976–77, 1982–83, 1984–85, 1989–90, 1993–94, 1995–96, 1998–99, 2003–04, 2015–16, 2023–24
League Cup	10	1980–81, 1981–82, 1982–83, 1983–84, 1994–95, 2000–01, 2002–03, 2011–12, 2021–22, 2023–24	6	1991–92, 2005–06, 2008–09, 2009–10, 2016–17, 2022–23
FA Charity Shield/FA Community Shield (* = shared)	16	1964*, 1965*, 1966, 1974, 1976, 1977*, 1979, 1980, 1982, 1986*, 1988, 1989, 1990*, 2001, 2006, 2022	21	1908, 1911, 1952, 1956, 1957, 1965*, 1967*, 1977*, 1983, 1990*, 1993, 1994, 1996, 1997, 2003, 2007, 2008, 2010, 2011, 2013, 2016
Football League Super Cup	1	1986	0	
Domestic total	55		60	
European honours
European Cup/UEFA Champions League	6	1976–77, 1977–78, 1980–81, 1983–84, 2004–05, 2018–19	3	1967–68, 1998–99, 2007–08
UEFA Cup/Europa League	3	1972–73, 1975–76, 2000–01	1	2016–17
European Cup Winners' Cup	0		1	1990–91
European Super Cup/UEFA Super Cup	4	1977, 2001, 2005, 2019	1	1991
European total	13		6	
Worldwide honours
FIFA Club World Cup	1	2019	1	2008
Intercontinental Cup	0		1	1999
Worldwide total	1		2	
Combined total
Combined total	69		68	

=== Head-to-head ===
As of 22 November 2026

The below table demonstrates the competitive results between the two sides (not indicative of titles won).

Competition	Liverpool wins	Draws	Manchester United wins
League	63	53	71
FA Cup	4	4	11
League Cup	3	0	2
Europa League	1	1	0
Charity Shield	1	3	1
Play-offs	1	0	0
Total	73	61	85

=== All-time results ===
==== Liverpool in the league at home ====
Date	Venue	Score	Competition
12 October 1895	Anfield	7–1	Second Division
22 April 1905	Anfield	4–0	Second Division
1 April 1907	Anfield	0–1	First Division
25 March 1908	Anfield	7–4	First Division
30 January 1909	Anfield	3–1	First Division
9 October 1909	Anfield	3–2	First Division
26 November 1910	Anfield	3–2	First Division
11 November 1911	Anfield	3–2	First Division
29 March 1913	Anfield	0–2	First Division
15 April 1914	Anfield	1–2	First Division
26 December 1914	Anfield	1–1	First Division
1 January 1920	Anfield	0–0	First Division
9 February 1921	Anfield	2–0	First Division
17 December 1921	Anfield	2–1	First Division
19 September 1925	Anfield	5–0	First Division
28 August 1926	Anfield	4–2	First Division
24 December 1927	Anfield	2–0	First Division
13 February 1929	Anfield	2–3	First Division
25 January 1930	Anfield	1–0	First Division
3 April 1931	Anfield	1–1	First Division
27 March 1937	Anfield	2–0	First Division
7 September 1938	Anfield	1–0	First Division
18 November 1939	Anfield	1–0	West Region War League
23 November 1940	Anfield	2–2	North Region War League
23 November 1940	Anfield	2–2	North Region War League
26 April 1941	Anfield	2–1	North Region War League
22 November 1941	Anfield	1–1	North Region War League
17 October 1942	Anfield	2–1	North Region War League
23 October 1943	Anfield	3–4	North Region War League
30 October 1943	Anfield	0–1	North Region War League
4 November 1944	Anfield	3–2	North Region War League
16 February 1946	Anfield	0–5	North Region War League
3 May 1947	Anfield	1–0	First Division
3 September 1947	Anfield	2–2	First Division
27 December 1948	Anfield	0–2	First Division
7 September 1949	Anfield	1–1	First Division
23 August 1950	Anfield	2–1	First Division
24 November 1951	Anfield	0–0	First Division
13 December 1952	Anfield	1–2	First Division
22 August 1953	Anfield	4–4	First Division
13 April 1963	Anfield	1–0	First Division
10 April 1964	Anfield	3–0	First Division
31 October 1964	Anfield	0–2	First Division
1 January 1966	Anfield	2–1	First Division
25 March 1967	Anfield	0–0	First Division
11 November 1967	Anfield	1–2	First Division
12 October 1968	Anfield	2–0	First Division
13 December 1969	Anfield	1–4	First Division
5 September 1970	Anfield	1–1	First Division
25 September 1971	Anfield	2–2	First Division
15 August 1972	Anfield	2–0	First Division
22 December 1973	Anfield	2–0	First Division
8 November 1975	Anfield	3–1	First Division
3 May 1977	Anfield	1–0	First Division
25 February 1978	Anfield	3–1	First Division
14 April 1979	Anfield	2–0	First Division
26 December 1979	Anfield	2–0	First Division
14 April 1981	Anfield	0–1	First Division
24 October 1981	Anfield	1–2	First Division
16 October 1982	Anfield	0–0	First Division
2 January 1984	Anfield	1–1	First Division
31 March 1985	Anfield	0–1	First Division
9 February 1986	Anfield	1–1	First Division
26 December 1986	Anfield	0–1	First Division
4 April 1988	Anfield	3–3	First Division
3 September 1988	Anfield	1–0	First Division
23 December 1989	Anfield	0–0	First Division
16 September 1990	Anfield	4–0	First Division
26 April 1992	Anfield	2–0	First Division
6 March 1993	Anfield	1–2	Premier League
4 January 1994	Anfield	3–3	Premier League
19 March 1995	Anfield	2–0	Premier League
17 December 1995	Anfield	2–0	Premier League
19 April 1997	Anfield	1–3	Premier League
6 December 1997	Anfield	1–3	Premier League
5 May 1999	Anfield	2–2	Premier League
11 September 1999	Anfield	2–3	Premier League
31 March 2001	Anfield	2–0	Premier League
4 November 2001	Anfield	3–1	Premier League
1 December 2002	Anfield	1–2	Premier League
9 November 2003	Anfield	1–2	Premier League
15 January 2005	Anfield	0–1	Premier League
18 September 2005	Anfield	0–0	Premier League
3 March 2007	Anfield	0–1	Premier League
16 December 2007	Anfield	0–1	Premier League
13 September 2008	Anfield	2–1	Premier League
25 October 2009	Anfield	2–0	Premier League
6 March 2011	Anfield	3–1	Premier League
15 October 2011	Anfield	1–1	Premier League
23 September 2012	Anfield	1–2	Premier League
1 September 2013	Anfield	1–0	Premier League
22 March 2015	Anfield	1–2	Premier League
17 January 2016	Anfield	0–1	Premier League
17 October 2016	Anfield	0–0	Premier League
14 October 2017	Anfield	0–0	Premier League
16 December 2018	Anfield	3–1	Premier League
19 January 2020	Anfield	2–0	Premier League
17 January 2021	Anfield	0–0	Premier League
19 April 2022	Anfield	4–0	Premier League
5 March 2023	Anfield	7–0	Premier League
17 December 2023	Anfield	0–0	Premier League
5 January 2025	Anfield	2–2	Premier League
19 October 2025	Anfield	1–2	Premier League
22 November 2026	Anfield	4–0	Premier League

==== Manchester United in the league at home ====
Date	Venue	Score	Competition
2 November 1895	Bank Street	5–2	Second Division
24 December 1904	Bank Street	3–1	Second Division
25 December 1906	Bank Street	0–0	First Division
7 September 1907	Bank Street	4–0	First Division
26 September 1908	Bank Street	3–2	First Division
19 February 1910	Old Trafford	3–4	First Division
1 April 1911	Old Trafford	2–0	First Division
23 March 1912	Old Trafford	1–1	First Division
23 November 1912	Old Trafford	3–1	First Division
1 November 1913	Old Trafford	3–0	First Division
2 April 1915	Old Trafford	2–0	First Division
26 December 1919	Old Trafford	0–0	First Division
5 February 1921	Old Trafford	1–1	First Division
24 December 1921	Old Trafford	0–0	First Division
10 March 1926	Old Trafford	3–3	First Division
15 January 1927	Old Trafford	0–1	First Division
5 May 1928	Old Trafford	6–1	First Division
15 September 1928	Old Trafford	2–2	First Division
21 September 1929	Old Trafford	1–2	First Division
6 April 1931	Old Trafford	4–1	First Division
21 November 1936	Old Trafford	2–5	First Division
6 May 1939	Old Trafford	2–0	First Division
16 March 1940	Old Trafford	1–0	West Region War League
30 Novemrber 1940	Old Trafford	2–0	North Region War League
3 May 1941	Maine Road	1-1	North Region War League
29 Novemrber 1941	Maine Road	2–2	North Region War League
10 October 1942	Maine Road	3–4	North Region War League
30 October 1943	Maine Road	1-0	North Region War League
11 Novemrber 1944	Maine Road	2–5	North Region War League
9 February 1946	Maine Road	2–1	North Region War League
11 September 1946	Maine Road	5–0	First Division
27 August 1947	Maine Road	2–0	First Division
25 December 1948	Old Trafford	0–0	First Division
15 March 1950	Old Trafford	0–0	First Division
30 August 1950	Old Trafford	1–0	First Division
12 April 1952	Old Trafford	4–0	First Division
20 April 1953	Old Trafford	3–1	First Division
19 December 1953	Old Trafford	5–1	First Division
10 November 1962	Old Trafford	3–3	First Division
23 November 1963	Old Trafford	0–1	First Division
24 April 1965	Old Trafford	3–0	First Division
9 October 1965	Old Trafford	2–0	First Division
10 December 1966	Old Trafford	2–2	First Division
6 April 1968	Old Trafford	1–2	First Division
14 December 1968	Old Trafford	1–0	First Division
13 September 1969	Old Trafford	1–0	First Division
19 April 1971	Old Trafford	0–2	First Division
3 April 1972	Old Trafford	0–3	First Division
11 November 1972	Old Trafford	2–0	First Division
29 September 1973	Old Trafford	0–0	First Division
18 February 1976	Old Trafford	0–0	First Division
16 February 1977	Old Trafford	0–0	First Division
1 October 1977	Old Trafford	2–0	First Division
26 December 1978	Old Trafford	0–3	First Division
5 April 1980	Old Trafford	2–1	First Division
26 December 1980	Old Trafford	0–0	First Division
7 April 1982	Old Trafford	0–1	First Division
26 February 1983	Old Trafford	1–1	First Division
24 September 1983	Old Trafford	1–0	First Division
22 September 1984	Old Trafford	1–1	First Division
19 October 1985	Old Trafford	1–1	First Division
20 April 1987	Old Trafford	1–0	First Division
15 November 1987	Old Trafford	1–1	First Division
1 January 1989	Old Trafford	3–1	First Division
18 March 1990	Old Trafford	1–2	First Division
3 February 1991	Old Trafford	1–1	First Division
6 October 1991	Old Trafford	0–0	First Division
18 October 1992	Old Trafford	2–2	Premier League
30 March 1994	Old Trafford	1–0	Premier League
17 September 1994	Old Trafford	2–0	Premier League
1 October 1995	Old Trafford	2–2	Premier League
12 October 1996	Old Trafford	1–0	Premier League
10 April 1998	Old Trafford	1–1	Premier League
24 September 1998	Old Trafford	2–0	Premier League
4 March 2000	Old Trafford	1–1	Premier League
17 December 2000	Old Trafford	0–1	Premier League
22 January 2002	Old Trafford	0–1	Premier League
5 April 2003	Old Trafford	4–0	Premier League
24 April 2004	Old Trafford	0–1	Premier League
20 September 2004	Old Trafford	2–1	Premier League
22 January 2006	Old Trafford	1–0	Premier League
22 October 2006	Old Trafford	2–0	Premier League
23 March 2008	Old Trafford	3–0	Premier League
14 March 2009	Old Trafford	1–4	Premier League
21 March 2010	Old Trafford	2–1	Premier League
19 September 2010	Old Trafford	3–2	Premier League
11 February 2012	Old Trafford	2–1	Premier League
13 January 2013	Old Trafford	2–1	Premier League
16 March 2014	Old Trafford	0–3	Premier League
14 December 2014	Old Trafford	3–0	Premier League
12 September 2015	Old Trafford	3–1	Premier League
15 January 2017	Old Trafford	1–1	Premier League
10 March 2018	Old Trafford	2–1	Premier League
24 February 2019	Old Trafford	0–0	Premier League
20 October 2019	Old Trafford	1–1	Premier League
13 May 2021	Old Trafford	2–4	Premier League
24 October 2021	Old Trafford	0–5	Premier League
22 August 2022	Old Trafford	2–1	Premier League
7 April 2024	Old Trafford	2–2	Premier League
1 September 2024	Old Trafford	0–3	Premier League
3 May 2026	Old Trafford	3–2	Premier League

==== Total league head-to-head ====
League home record
Home team	Wins	Draws	Losses
Liverpool	44	24	26
Manchester United	45	29	19

Overall league head-to-head record
Liverpool wins	Draws	Manchester United wins
63	53	71

==== Results in domestic cup matches ====
Date	Venue	Matches			Competition
Date	Venue	Team 1	Score	Team 2	Competition
12 February 1898	Bank Street	Newton Heath	0–0	Liverpool	FA Cup 2nd round
16 February 1898	Anfield	Liverpool	2–1	Newton Heath	FA Cup 2nd round replay
7 February 1903	Bank Street	Manchester United	2–1	Liverpool	FA Cup 1st round
8 January 1921	Anfield	Liverpool	1–1	Manchester United	FA Cup 1st round
12 January 1921	Old Trafford	Manchester United	1–2	Liverpool	FA Cup 1st round replay
24 January 1948	Goodison Park (Note: Due to war damage, Old Trafford was closed at the time, and Manchester United were playing their home matches at Maine Road. However, on the same day, Manchester City were at home to Chelsea in another FA Cup tie and as a result this tie was switched to Goodison Park.)	Manchester United	3–0	Liverpool	FA Cup 4th round
30 January 1960	Anfield	Liverpool	1–3	Manchester United	FA Cup 4th round
14 August 1965	Old Trafford	Manchester United	2–2	Liverpool	Charity Shield
21 May 1977	Wembley	Manchester United	2–1	Liverpool	FA Cup final
13 August 1977	Wembley	Liverpool	0–0	Manchester United	Charity Shield
31 March 1979	Maine Road	Manchester United	2–2 (a.e.t.)	Liverpool	FA Cup semi-final
4 April 1979	Goodison Park	Manchester United	1–0	Liverpool	FA Cup semi-final replay
26 March 1983	Wembley	Liverpool	2–1 (a.e.t.)	Manchester United	League Cup final
20 August 1983	Wembley	Manchester United	2–0	Liverpool	Charity Shield
13 April 1985	Goodison Park	Manchester United	2–2 (a.e.t.)	Liverpool	FA Cup semi-final
17 April 1985	Maine Road	Manchester United	2–1	Liverpool	FA Cup semi-final replay
26 November 1985	Anfield	Liverpool	2–1	Manchester United	League Cup 4th round
18 August 1990	Wembley	Liverpool	1–1	Manchester United	Charity Shield
31 October 1990	Old Trafford	Manchester United	3–1	Liverpool	League Cup 3rd round
11 May 1996	Wembley	Manchester United	1–0	Liverpool	FA Cup final
24 January 1999	Old Trafford	Manchester United	2–1	Liverpool	FA Cup 4th round
12 August 2001	Millennium Stadium	Liverpool	2–1	Manchester United	Charity Shield
2 March 2003	Millennium Stadium	Liverpool	2–0	Manchester United	League Cup final
18 February 2006	Anfield	Liverpool	1–0	Manchester United	FA Cup 5th round
9 January 2011	Old Trafford	Manchester United	1–0	Liverpool	FA Cup 3rd round
28 January 2012	Anfield	Liverpool	2–1	Manchester United	FA Cup 4th round
25 September 2013	Old Trafford	Manchester United	1–0	Liverpool	League Cup 3rd round
24 January 2021	Old Trafford	Manchester United	3–2	Liverpool	FA Cup 4th round
17 March 2024	Old Trafford	Manchester United	4–3 (a.e.t.)	Liverpool	FA Cup quarter-final

Overall domestic cups head-to-head record
Liverpool wins	Draws	Manchester United wins
8	7	14

==== Results in European competitions ====
Date	Venue	Matches			Competition
Date	Venue	Team 1	Score	Team 2	Competition
10 March 2016	Anfield	Liverpool	2–0	Manchester United	Europa League round of 16
17 March 2016	Old Trafford	Manchester United	1–1	Liverpool	Europa League round of 16

Overall European competitions head-to-head record
Liverpool wins	Draws	Manchester United wins
1	1	0

==== Results in play-offs ====
Date	Venue	Matches			Competition
Date	Venue	Team 1	Score	Team 2	Competition
28 April 1894	Ewood Park	Liverpool	2–0	Newton Heath	Football League test match

Overall play-off head-to-head record
Liverpool wins	Draws	Manchester United wins
1	0	0

==== Results in friendly matches ====
Date	Venue	Matches			Competition
Date	Venue	Team 1	Score	Team 2	Competition
5 August 2014	Sun Life Stadium	Liverpool	1–3	Manchester United	2014 International Champions Cup
29 July 2018	Michigan Stadium	Manchester United	1–4	Liverpool	2018 International Champions Cup
12 July 2022	Rajamangala Stadium	Manchester United	4–0	Liverpool	Bangkok Century Cup
3 August 2024	Williams–Brice Stadium	Manchester United	0–3	Liverpool	Friendly

Overall friendly matches head-to-head record
Liverpool wins	Draws	Manchester United wins
2	0	2

=== Women's football results ===
Following the creation of Manchester United W.F.C. in 2018, the rivalry has now appeared in women's football as matches between the sides are now possible. Liverpool F.C. Women was created in 1989.

Date	Venue	Matches			Competition
Date	Venue	Team 1	Score	Team 2	Competition
19 August 2018	Prenton Park	Liverpool	0–1	Manchester United	League Cup
28 September 2019	Leigh Sports Village	Manchester United	2–0	Liverpool	Women's Super League
7 October 2020	Prenton Park	Liverpool	3–1	Manchester United	League Cup
8 August 2021	Carrington	Manchester United	2–2	Liverpool	Pre-season friendly
15 January 2023	Leigh Sports Village	Manchester United	6–0	Liverpool	Women's Super League
27 May 2023	Prenton Park	Liverpool	0–1	Manchester United	Women's Super League
17 December 2023	Leigh Sports Village	Manchester United	1–2	Liverpool	Women's Super League
5 May 2024	Prenton Park	Liverpool	1–0	Manchester United	Women's Super League
2 October 2024	Leigh Sports Village	Manchester United	2–0	Liverpool	Women's League Cup
8 December 2024	Leigh Sports Village	Manchester United	4–0	Liverpool	Women's Super League

Overall women's football head-to-head record
Liverpool wins	Draws	Manchester United wins
3	1	6

== See also ==
- List of association football rivalries
- Liverpool–Manchester rivalry
- List of football clubs in England by competitive honours won
- 1915 British football betting scandal
