= El Hadji Diouf =

Senegalese footballer (born 1981)

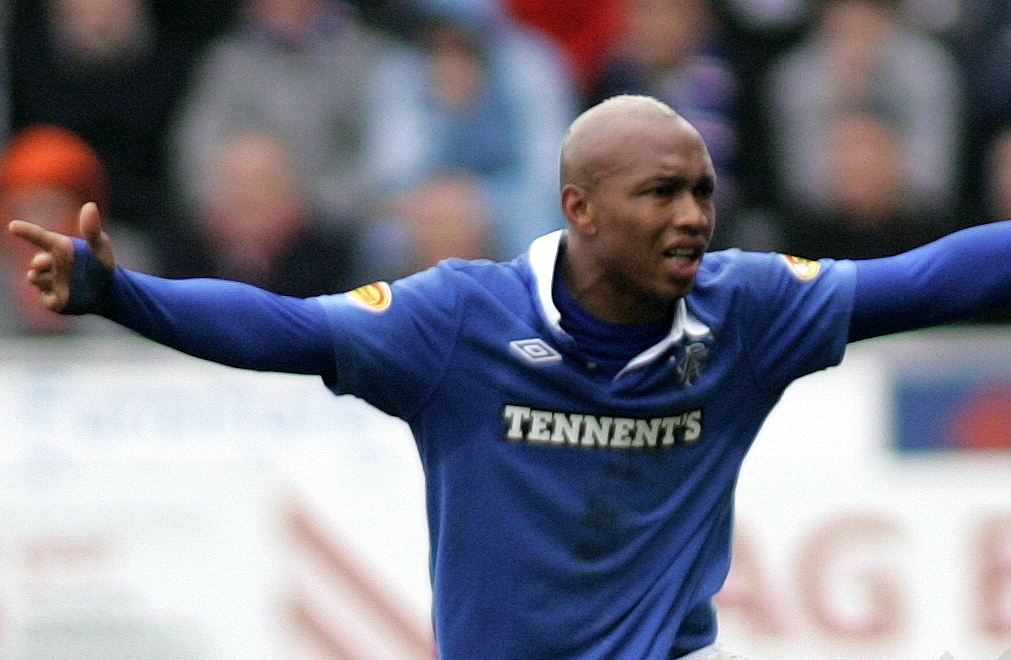
- Diouf playing for Rangers in 2011

Personal information
- Full name: El Hadji Ousseynou Diouf
- Date of birth: 15 January 1981 (age 45)
- Place of birth: Dakar, Senegal
- Height: 1.80 m (5 ft 11 in)
- Positions: Winger; forward

Youth career
- –1998: Sochaux

Senior career*
| Years | Team | Apps | (Gls) |
| 1998–1999 | Sochaux | 16 | (0) |
| 1999–2000 | Rennes | 28 | (1) |
| 2000–2002 | Lens | 54 | (18) |
| 2002–2005 | Liverpool | 55 | (3) |
| 2004–2005 | → Bolton Wanderers (loan) | 27 | (9) |
| 2005–2008 | Bolton Wanderers | 87 | (12) |
| 2008–2009 | Sunderland | 14 | (0) |
| 2009–2011 | Blackburn Rovers | 60 | (4) |
| 2011 | → Rangers (loan) | 15 | (1) |
| 2011–2012 | Doncaster Rovers | 22 | (6) |
| 2012–2014 | Leeds United | 42 | (5) |
| 2014–2015 | Sabah | 10 | (4) |
| Total | | 428 | (69) |

International career
| 2000–2008 | Senegal | 70 | (24) |
Medal record
Men's football
Representing Senegal
African Cup of Nations
| Runner-up | 2002 Mali |
- * Club domestic league appearances and goals

El Hadji Ousseynou Diouf (French pronunciation: [ɛ.ladʒi.djuf]; born 15 January 1981) is a Senegalese former professional footballer who played as a winger or a forward.

Having started his professional football career in France with Sochaux, Rennes and Lens, Diouf finalised a move to Premier League side Liverpool prior to the 2002 FIFA World Cup for Senegal and went on to have a memorable tournament. He has also played in England's top flight for Bolton Wanderers, Sunderland and Blackburn Rovers before a stint in the Scottish Premier League with Rangers. In 2011, he joined Football League Championship side Doncaster Rovers but was released at the end of the 2011–12 season following the club's relegation. He then moved to Leeds United where he spent two seasons. During his nine-year international career, he scored 21 goals in 69 caps, and also garnered considerable notoriety for a series of controversial incidents.

== Early life ==
Born in Dakar, Senegal, Diouf came from a Serer background of the noble Diouf family.

== Club career ==
=== Early career ===
Diouf started his career in France with Sochaux. He made his debut appearance in a 2–1 win against Bastia on 12 November 1998, before moving to Rennes for the 1999–2000 season. He moved to Lens the following season, spending two years at the Pas-de-Calais.

=== Liverpool ===
In early June 2002, he was reportedly linked with the English club Liverpool, who had also just signed his club and international compatriot Salif Diao. The news initially broke following his Man of the Match performance in the opening 2002 FIFA World Cup 1–0 group game vs France, who were the defending World and European Champions and one of the favourites to win the 2002 tournament. Lens initially denied that the signing had been made, but it was finally confirmed on 2 June with an estimated price tag of £10m. His continued impressive performances in the World Cup for Senegal, where they reached the quarter-finals, led to much excitement prior to his arrival in England. Diouf was the striker that manager Gérard Houllier hoped would take the Premier League title from Arsenal, after Liverpool had finished in second place the previous season.

Diouf won praises for his early games for Liverpool including his first game at Anfield where he scored two goals, his first for the club, in a 3–0 win against Southampton on 24 August 2002. He started the 2003 Football League Cup Final as Liverpool defeated Manchester United.

Liverpool fans had to wait until March 2003 for Diouf's next goal for Liverpool. That occurred in a 2–0 win against Bolton Wanderers, in a game where he scored once and provided the assist for the second. The next game saw Diouf play in a UEFA Cup match against Celtic at Parkhead which finished 1–1. The game marked a watershed in his career when, in the 87th minute, he spat at a Celtic fan, causing crowd disturbances and Diouf to be interviewed by the police. He received a two match ban and was fined two weeks wages with Liverpool making a donation of £60,000 to a Glasgow charity of Celtic's choice.

Diouf failed to score for the remainder of the 2002–03 season or at all in the 2003–04 season which saw him pick up 13 yellow and one red card which came on 7 January 2004 when he was sent-off in a 1–0 away win against Chelsea for fouling Adrian Mutu. By then, he had become unpopular, due to both his attitude and his lack of goals. Jamie Carragher later said of him: "He has one of the worst strike rates of any forward in Liverpool history. He's the only no. 9 ever to go through a whole season without scoring, in fact he's probably the only no. 9 of any club to do that. He was always the last one to get picked in training". At the beginning of the 2004–05 season, he was loaned to Bolton Wanderers. At the end of the season-long loan — and after scoring a mere six goals in 80 appearances with only three in the league — Diouf left Liverpool signing permanently for Bolton in the summer of 2005.

=== Bolton Wanderers ===
Bolton Wanderers bought Diouf from Liverpool for an undisclosed fee at the start of the 2005–06 season, after they had loaned the player for the 2004–05 season. On 15 September 2005, Diouf scored Bolton's first ever goal in a European competition against Lokomotiv Plovdiv in a UEFA Cup match at the Reebok Stadium. Bolton went on to win the game 2–1. He was largely successful at Bolton and became a fans' favourite due to his flair and direct running. Diouf confirmed in an interview with the BBC that he would be leaving Bolton at the end of the 2007–08 season and that his goal against Sunderland on 3 May marked his last appearance at the Reebok Stadium.

=== Sunderland ===
Diouf signed for Sunderland on 28 July 2008, after Bolton agreed to a transfer fee of £2.63m. He signed a four-year contract at the Stadium of Light after undergoing a medical. Diouf said that he was happy to join Sunderland. Then-manager Roy Keane stated he was happy that Diouf had joined Sunderland, saying: "El Hadji has always been the kind of player opposition teams and supporters hate. That's why we're delighted to now have him in our squad." Diouf made a promising start for Sunderland but failed to score in any of his sixteen appearances.

=== Blackburn Rovers ===
Diouf signed for Blackburn Rovers for a £2 million fee on 30 January 2009, signing a three-and-a-half-year deal after just six months at the Stadium of Light, rejoining former Bolton manager Sam Allardyce at the club. He was given the number 18 shirt and scored his first goal for the club against Fulham at Craven Cottage on 11 March 2009 in a 2–1 win. During the summer transfer window, Blackburn manager Sam Allardyce revealed that Diouf was acquired for £1 million. Diouf scored his first home goal for Rovers at Ewood Park in the club's 3–1 victory over Wolverhampton Wanderers on 12 September 2009. On 2 January 2010, he was sent off in a 3–1 defeat to Aston Villa in the third round of the FA Cup. On 21 March 2010, Diouf scored the equalising goal against Chelsea in a 1–1 draw at Ewood Park which opened up the 2010 title race. He started the next two Premier League games against Birmingham and Burnley; he then made his fortieth appearance for the club at Fratton Park, playing against bottom-of-the-league side Portsmouth in a 0–0 draw on 3 April. By the end of the 2009–10 season, he had made 27 appearances, scoring three goals.

On 20 August 2011, Blackburn manager Steve Kean confirmed that Diouf was not in his first-team plans, and that he expected him to leave before the end of the 2011–12 transfer window. On 31 August 2011, Blackburn terminated Diouf's contract by mutual consent. He had fallen out with manager Kean after returning late for pre-season training.

==== Loan to Rangers ====
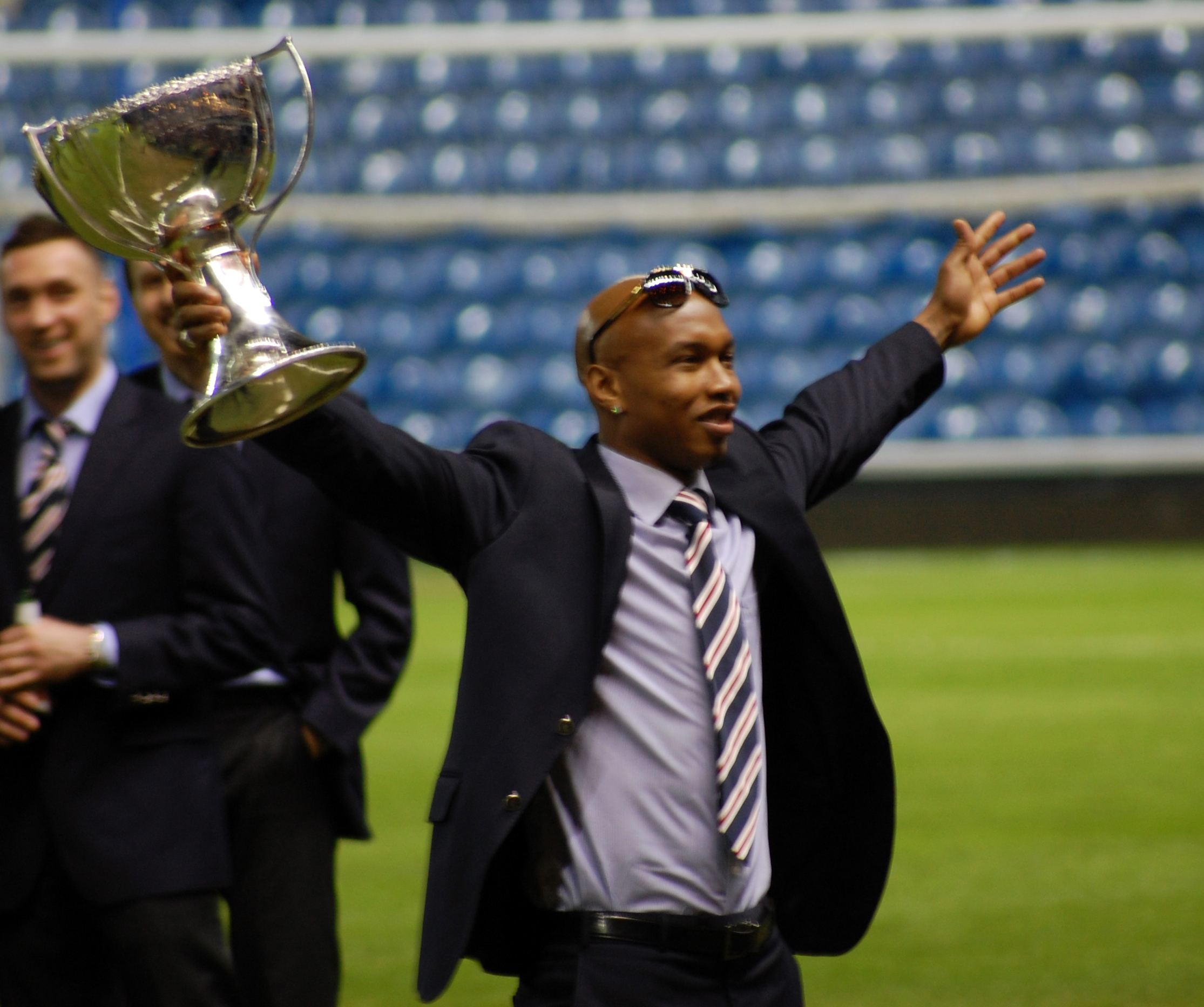
Diouf holding the Scottish League Cup during his time with Rangers.

On the last day of the 2011 January transfer window, Diouf joined Scottish Premier League champions Rangers on loan until the end of the 2010–11 season. He made his debut on 2 February, coming on as a 20th-minute substitute for injured teammate Lee McCulloch during a 1–0 win over Hearts at Ibrox. He made his first start for Rangers four days later in a 2–2 draw with Celtic in the Scottish Cup. Diouf scored his first goal for Rangers on 24 February in a 2–2 draw against Sporting CP in the Europa League, netting the opening goal of the game with a header in the 20th minute. He then scored his second goal for Rangers on 13 March in a Scottish Premier League match with Kilmarnock, again scoring the first goal as Rangers won 2–1. In March 2011, Diouf was part of the Rangers team that won the Scottish League Cup after a 2–1 win over rivals Celtic. Diouf also collected an SPL winners medal as Rangers performed a comeback from two points behind Celtic to win the league by one point.

=== Doncaster Rovers ===
In October 2011, Diouf was handed a trial by West Ham United and their manager, Sam Allardyce, his manager at both Bolton Wanderers and Blackburn Rovers. On 28 October, it was announced that Diouf would not be joining the club because of a lack of fitness and his bad reputation. Allardyce later confirmed that the depth of feeling amongst fans was taken into account in his decision not to sign the player.

On 31 October 2011, Diouf signed for Doncaster Rovers on a three-month contract. He scored his first two goals for Doncaster against Ipswich at Portman Road on 5 November 2011, earning Man of the Match honours and a 3–2 victory. He took the captain's armband in a goalless draw against Watford but a training injury meant he was unable to play the following games. On 2 February 2012, Diouf signed a six-month deal with the view to an extra year.

After Doncaster were relegated from the Championship, On 25 April 2012, Diouf was believed to have held talks with Leeds United with a view to signing him at the end of his Doncaster contract. Diouf claimed on 26 April he was very keen on moving to Leeds despite Leeds manager, Neil Warnock, having previously described him as "lower than a sewer rat" for an incident involving Jamie Mackie.

On 19 July 2012, it was announced that Diouf would not face charges for assault after being arrested following an incident in a Manchester nightclub in April.

=== Leeds United ===
On 9 August 2012, Diouf joined Leeds United on trial and started training with the first team. Diouf was confirmed to have signed a non-contract deal with Leeds United on 11 August. Diouf appeared as a substitute in the second half for Leeds against Shrewsbury Town in the League Cup on 11 August.

Diouf made his league début for Leeds as a first-half substitute in their 1–0 victory against Wolverhampton Wanderers. He made his first start for Leeds in their 2–1 victory over Peterborough United on 25 August.

On 1 September, Diouf scored his first goal for Leeds in a 3–3 draw against his former club Blackburn Rovers. After the match, it was announced that Diouf had signed a permanent contract at Leeds until January 2013. Diouf revealed that he had turned down more lucrative offers from elsewhere to become 'a legend' at Leeds by helping them reach the Premier League. Diouf put in an impressive performance for Leeds' 2–1 victory against Premiership side Everton on 25 September. After the match, manager Neil Warnock described Diouf as his 'matador' and that Diouf had made promises to stay at the club beyond his initial six-month contract.

Diouf scored a brace against Bristol City to help earn Leeds a 3–2 victory on 29 September. Diouf was named captain against his old side Bolton Wanderers in a 2–2 draw on 2 October. Diouf scored his fourth goal of the season on 30 October in a 3–0 League Cup win against Premier League side Southampton to help Leeds advance to the quarter-finals of the competition. Diouf scored his milestone fifth goal of the season with a penalty to help earn Leeds a 2–2 draw against Brighton on 2 November.

On 14 December 2012, Diouf signed a new 18-month deal at the club taking him until the end of the 2013–14 season. He scored his seventh goal of the season against Brighton on 27 April, but received his first red card as a Leeds player for celebrating it with a rude 'gesture' towards the Brighton fans.

In May 2013, after Guinea club AS Kaloum claimed to have signed Diouf, Leeds United and Diouf strenuously dismissed the claim as 'complete rubbish,' stating that Diouf would be playing for Leeds in the 2013–14 season. Diouf was ruled out of the entire 2013–14 pre-season due to a shin infection.

On 15 August 2013, the Yorkshire Evening Post reported that Diouf had been made available for transfer.

In December 2013, it was revealed that Diouf had missed several Leeds fixtures and training sessions due to unspecified "personal problems", and in order to attend the funerals of former mentor and Senegal coach Bruno Metsu and former President of South Africa Nelson Mandela.

Diouf made his first start for Leeds in several months on 28 January in a 1–1 draw against Ipswich Town. It was to be his final game for the club. On 16 May 2014, Diouf was released.

=== Sabah ===
In November 2014, Diouf signed a one-year contract with Malaysian side Sabah of the Malaysia Premier League, and was named team captain. However, Diouf soon found himself embroiled in controversy with his new club after comparing it unfavourably with rival club Johor Darul Takzim II during an interview with Johor TV. Diouf was reported to have said that "he is willing to build a JDT academy on his own land in Senegal and JDT will get the monetary returns from the proceed of selling players to European countries. He also said that he is willing to play for JDT without any money because of his love for the state of Johor as well as being impressed by the vision and mission of the club". Diouf said this was due to the lack of vision and mission by Sabah Football Association (SAFA). Deeming this behaviour "unprofessional," Sabah stripped Diouf of the captaincy in July 2015.

== International career ==
Diouf's international career started in April 2000 against Benin. He has earned 69 international caps and scored 21 goals for his country. He played for Senegal in their 2002 FIFA World Cup campaign and was elected to the World Cup All-Star team, after leading Senegal to the quarter-finals and victories over France (1–0) and Sweden (2–1). Senegal eventually lost 1–0 in extra time to Turkey. He was also part of the Senegal team who were the runners-up in the 2002 African Cup of Nations, but was one of the players who missed a penalty during the shootout in the final as they lost to Cameroon. Diouf was banned from international football for four matches in 2004 for a verbal assault on referee Ali Bujsaim.

In 2004, he was named in the FIFA 100, a list of the 125 greatest living footballers selected by Pelé in conjunction with FIFA's centenary celebrations. In October 2007, Diouf retired from international football, stating he had been frustrated by organisational problems with the side. However, Senegal coach Henryk Kasperczak announced later in the month that he would name Diouf in the next squad.

In 2011, Diouf was banned for five years from playing for the Senegal national side, after reacting angrily to claims that he had failed to attend a disciplinary hearing. In September 2012, The Senegal Football Federation confirmed that Diouf's five-year ban had been decreased and that he was available to play for the Senegal national side again. After becoming available for the Senegal national side, in October 2012, Diouf was left out of the squad to face Côte d'Ivoire in an African Cup of Nations qualifier, Diouf proclaimed that he felt he was left out of the squad because the Senegal federation were 'scared' of him.

Diouf was twice named the African Footballer of the Year.

== Controversies ==
=== In France ===
Diouf's professional career has at times been overshadowed by controversy. During his time at Sochaux, he was involved in a succession of minor transgressions. This resulted in the move to Rennes, where he was convicted for driving without a licence, and was involved in a car crash. Taking into account his age and evident remorse, the French courts sentenced Diouf to community service.

=== In England ===
Several times during his early Premier League career, Diouf was accused of spitting at fans and opposition players. In 2002, he was accused of spitting at West Ham United fans while warming up as a substitute for Liverpool during a game at Anfield. An investigation by Merseyside Police found no evidence that an offence had been committed, but that Diouf had spat on the ground. On 13 March 2003, while playing for Liverpool, he was involved in an incident when he spat at Celtic fans during a televised UEFA Cup quarter-final. His club fined him two weeks' wages, UEFA gave him a two-match ban, and Diouf was charged with assault. Although Diouf initially pleaded not guilty, he later changed his plea to guilty, and was fined £5,000. In November 2004 while on loan to Bolton, Diouf was charged by the police for spitting at an 11-year-old Middlesbrough fan during a 1–1 draw. Then, on 27 November 2004, Diouf spat in the face of Portsmouth player Arjan de Zeeuw. Bolton fined him two weeks' wages and the FA banned him for three games after he pleaded guilty to a charge of improper conduct. Bolton manager Sam Allardyce later revealed that he considered sending Diouf to see a sports psychologist.

On 20 September 2009, Diouf was questioned by police after allegations that he had made a racial slur to a ball-boy during a match at Everton, telling him to "fuck off, white boy". Diouf defended his actions by saying that the ball-boy had thrown the ball to him "like a bone to a dog" and that Everton fans were racially abusing and throwing bananas at him. Police found no evidence of this.

In April 2010, Diouf was arrested and charged with motoring offences in Manchester.

On 8 January 2011, following Blackburn's 1–0 win over Queens Park Rangers in the FA Cup third round, QPR manager Neil Warnock accused Diouf of taunting Jamie Mackie whilst the latter lay on the pitch injured with a broken leg and referred to Diouf as "lower than a sewer rat".

On 14 July 2011, it was reported that Diouf had not joined Blackburn Rovers for a pre-season tour of Austria and that his whereabouts were unknown. The club stated that disciplinary measures would be taken against him.

On 15 April 2012, Diouf and five other men were arrested following reports of a nightclub brawl in Manchester. One man was seriously injured and Diouf was bailed for a week.

On 27 April 2013, Diouf was shown a controversial red card at Elland Road after making offensive gestures towards the Brighton away fans.

=== In Scotland ===
In February 2011, Diouf became embroiled in an argument with Celtic Captain Scott Brown after several on pitch altercations with Brown in the Scottish Cup fifth round, most notable of which resulted in Brown specifically turning to Diouf to celebrate his equalising goal.

On 2 March 2011, Diouf was one of three Rangers players sent off in the Scottish Cup fifth round replay after an altercation at the touchline with Neil Lennon and dissent to the referee at full-time. Diouf was fined £5,000 in April 2011 and warned over his future conduct by the Scottish Football Association.

== After football ==
In 2017, Diouf, was in Dakar working as a government goodwill ambassador and adviser on sport to Senegalese President Macky Sall, and running his own sports newspaper and a gymnasium.

Before the 2026 World Cup, Diouf publicly backed the Senegal national team, claiming they have enough quality to reach the tournament's final. He also shared that he stays in touch with senior squad members like Sadio Mane and Idrissa Gueye, urging them to build on the legacy of the famous 2002 generation in their group stage matches against France, Norway, and Iraq.

== Career statistics ==
=== Club ===
Appearances and goals by club, season and competition
| Club | Season | League | | | National cup (Note: Includes Coupe de France, FA Cup, Scottish Cup) | | League cup (Note: Includes Coupe de la Ligue, Football League Cup, Scottish League Cup) | | Continental | | Other | | Total | |
| Club | Season | Division | Apps | Goals | Apps | Goals | Apps | Goals | Apps | Goals | Apps | Goals | Apps | Goals |
|---|---|---|---|---|---|---|---|---|---|---|---|---|---|---|
| Sochaux | 1998–99 | Division 1 | 15 | 0 | 0 | 0 | 3 | 0 | — | | — | | 18 | 12 |
| Rennes | 1999–2000 | Division 1 | 28 | 1 | 3 | 1 | 1 | 0 | 6 | 2 | — | | 38 | 4 |
| Lens | 2000–01 | Division 1 | 28 | 8 | 0 | 0 | 2 | 1 | 2 | 0 | — | | 32 | 9 |
| Lens | 2001–02 | Division 1 | 26 | 10 | 0 | 0 | 1 | 0 | — | | — | | 27 | 10 |
| Lens | Total | | 54 | 18 | 0 | 0 | 3 | 1 | 2 | 0 | — | | 59 | 19 |
| Liverpool | 2002–03 | Premier League | 29 | 3 | 3 | 0 | 5 | 3 | 9 | 0 | 1 (Note: Appearance in FA Community Shield) | 0 | 47 | 6 |
| Liverpool | 2003–04 | Premier League | 26 | 0 | 1 | 0 | 2 | 0 | 4 (Note: Appearances in UEFA Cup) | 0 | — | | 33 | 0 |
| Liverpool | Total | | 55 | 3 | 4 | 0 | 7 | 3 | 13 | 0 | 1 | 0 | 80 | 6 |
| Bolton Wanderers | 2004–05 | Premier League | 27 | 9 | 3 | 0 | 2 | 0 | — | | — | | 32 | 9 |
| Bolton Wanderers | 2005–06 | Premier League | 20 | 3 | — | | 1 | 0 | 6 | 1 | — | | 27 | 4 |
| Bolton Wanderers | 2006–07 | Premier League | 33 | 5 | 1 | 0 | 1 | 0 | — | | — | | 35 | 5 |
| Bolton Wanderers | 2007–08 | Premier League | 34 | 4 | 1 | 0 | 1 | 0 | 6 | 2 | — | | 42 | 6 |
| Bolton Wanderers | Total | | 114 | 21 | 5 | 0 | 5 | 0 | 12 | 3 | — | | 136 | 24 |
| Sunderland | 2008–09 | Premier League | 14 | 0 | 1 | 0 | 1 | 0 | — | | — | | 16 | 0 |
| Blackburn Rovers | 2008–09 | Premier League | 14 | 1 | 0 | 0 | 0 | 0 | — | | — | | 14 | 1 |
| Blackburn Rovers | 2009–10 | Premier League | 26 | 3 | 1 | 0 | 0 | 0 | — | | — | | 27 | 3 |
| Blackburn Rovers | 2010–11 | Premier League | 20 | 0 | 1 | 0 | 0 | 0 | — | | — | | 21 | 0 |
| Blackburn Rovers | Total | | 60 | 4 | 2 | 0 | 0 | 0 | — | | — | | 62 | 4 |
| Rangers (loan) | 2010–11 | Scottish Premier League | 15 | 1 | 2 | 0 | 1 | 0 | 4 (Note: Appearances in UEFA Europa League) | 1 | — | | 22 | 2 |
| Doncaster Rovers | 2011–12 | Championship | 22 | 6 | 1 | 0 | 0 | 0 | 0 | 0 | — | | 23 | 6 |
| Leeds United | 2012–13 | Championship | 36 | 5 | 4 | 1 | 5 | 1 | 0 | 0 | — | | 45 | 7 |
| Leeds United | 2013–14 | Championship | 6 | 0 | 0 | 0 | 1 | 0 | 0 | 0 | — | | 7 | 0 |
| Leeds United | Total | | 42 | 5 | 4 | 1 | 6 | 1 | 0 | 0 | — | | 52 | 7 |
| Sabah | 2015 | Malaysia Premier League | 3 | 3 | 1 | 0 | 0 | 0 | — | | — | | 4 | 3 |
| Career total | | | 422 | 62 | 23 | 2 | 27 | 5 | 37 | 6 | 1 | 0 | 510 | 75 |

=== International ===
Appearances and goals by national team and year
| National team | Year | Apps | Goals |
|---|---|---|---|
| Senegal | 2000 | 3 | 0 |
| Senegal | 2001 | 10 | 11 |
| Senegal | 2002 | 15 | 2 |
| Senegal | 2003 | 8 | 3 |
| Senegal | 2004 | 6 | 0 |
| Senegal | 2005 | 7 | 4 |
| Senegal | 2006 | 7 | 0 |
| Senegal | 2007 | 3 | 2 |
| Senegal | 2008 | 11 | 2 |
| Total | | 70 | 24 |

Scores and results list Senegal's goal tally first, score column indicates score after each Diouf goal.

List of international goals scored by El Hadji Diouf
| No. | Date | Venue | Opponent | Score | Result | Competition | Ref. |
|---|---|---|---|---|---|---|---|
| 1 | 10 March 2001 | Stade Léopold Sédar Senghor, Dakar, Senegal | Namibia | 1-0 | 4-0 | 2002 FIFA World Cup qualification | |
| 2 | 10 March 2001 | Stade Léopold Sédar Senghor, Dakar, Senegal | Namibia | 2-0 | 4-0 | 2002 FIFA World Cup qualification | |
| 3 | 10 March 2001 | Stade Léopold Sédar Senghor, Dakar, Senegal | Namibia | 3-0 | 4-0 | 2002 FIFA World Cup qualification | |
| 4 | 24 March 2001 | Stade Léopold Sédar Senghor, Dakar, Senegal | Uganda | 1-0 | 3-0 | 2002 African Cup of Nations qualification | |
| 5 | 24 March 2001 | Stade Léopold Sédar Senghor, Dakar, Senegal | Uganda | 3-0 | 3-0 | 2002 African Cup of Nations qualification | |
| 6 | 21 April 2001 | Stade Léopold Sédar Senghor, Dakar, Senegal | Algeria | 1-0 | 3-0 | 2002 FIFA World Cup qualification | |
| 7 | 21 April 2001 | Stade Léopold Sédar Senghor, Dakar, Senegal | Algeria | 2-0 | 3-0 | 2002 FIFA World Cup qualification | |
| 8 | 21 April 2001 | Stade Léopold Sédar Senghor, Dakar, Senegal | Algeria | 3-0 | 3-0 | 2002 FIFA World Cup qualification | |
| 9 | 14 July 2001 | Stade Léopold Sédar Senghor, Dakar, Senegal | Morocco | 1-0 | 1-0 | 2002 FIFA World Cup qualification | |
| 10 | 21 July 2001 | Independence Stadium, Windhoek, Namibia | Namibia | 2-0 | 5-0 | 2002 FIFA World Cup qualification | |
| 11 | 4 October 2001 | Stade Bollaert-Delelis, Lens, France | Japan | 1-0 | 2-0 | Friendly | |
| 12 | 4 February 2002 | Stade Modibo Kéïta, Bamako, Mali | DR Congo | 2-0 | 2-0 | 2002 African Cup of Nations | |
| 13 | 14 May 2002 | Riyadh, Saudi Arabia | Saudi Arabia | 2-2 | 2-3 | Friendly | |
| 14 | 7 June 2003 | Stade Léopold Sédar Senghor, Dakar, Senegal | Gambia | 3-1 | 3-1 | 2004 African Cup of Nations qualification | |
| 15 | 14 June 2003 | Stade Léopold Sédar Senghor, Dakar, Senegal | Lesotho | 1-0 | 3-0 | 2004 African Cup of Nations qualification | |
| 16 | 15 November 2003 | Stade Léopold Sédar Senghor, Dakar, Senegal | Ivory Coast | 1-0 | 1-0 | Friendly | |
| 17 | 26 March 2005 | Stade Léopold Sédar Senghor, Dakar, Senegal | Liberia | 2-0 | 6-1 | 2006 FIFA World Cup qualification | |
| 18 | 26 March 2005 | Stade Léopold Sédar Senghor, Dakar, Senegal | Liberia | 6-0 | 6-1 | 2006 FIFA World Cup qualification | |
| 19 | 3 September 2005 | Konkola Stadium, Chililabombwe, Zambia' | Zambia | 1-0 | 1-0 | 2006 FIFA World Cup qualification | |
| 20 | 8 October 2005 | Stade Léopold Sédar Senghor, Dakar, Senegal | Mali | 2-0 | 3-0 | 2006 FIFA World Cup qualification | |
| 21 | 21 August 2007 | The Den, London, United Kingdom | Ghana | 1-1 | 1-1 | Friendly | |
| 22 | 8 September 2007 | Stade Léopold Sédar Senghor, Dakar, Senegal | Burkina Faso | 5-1 | 5-1 | 2008 Africa Cup of Nations qualification | |
| 23 | 15 June 2008 | Samuel Kanyon Doe Sports Complex, Monrovia, Liberia | Liberia | 1-0 | 2-2 | 2010 FIFA World Cup qualification | |
| 24 | 21 June 2008 | Stade Léopold Sédar Senghor, Dakar, Senegal | Liberia | 2-0 | 3-1 | 2010 FIFA World Cup qualification | |

== Honours ==
Liverpool

- Football League Cup: 2002–03

Rangers

- Scottish Premier League: 2010–11
- Scottish League Cup: 2010–11

Senegal

- Africa Cup of Nations runner-up: 2002

Individual

- African Footballer of the Year: 2001, 2002
- BBC African Footballer of the Year: 2002
- FIFA World Cup All-star team: 2002
- FIFA 100
