= Liverpool–Manchester rivalry =

Urban area of North West England

Locations of the cities, in England

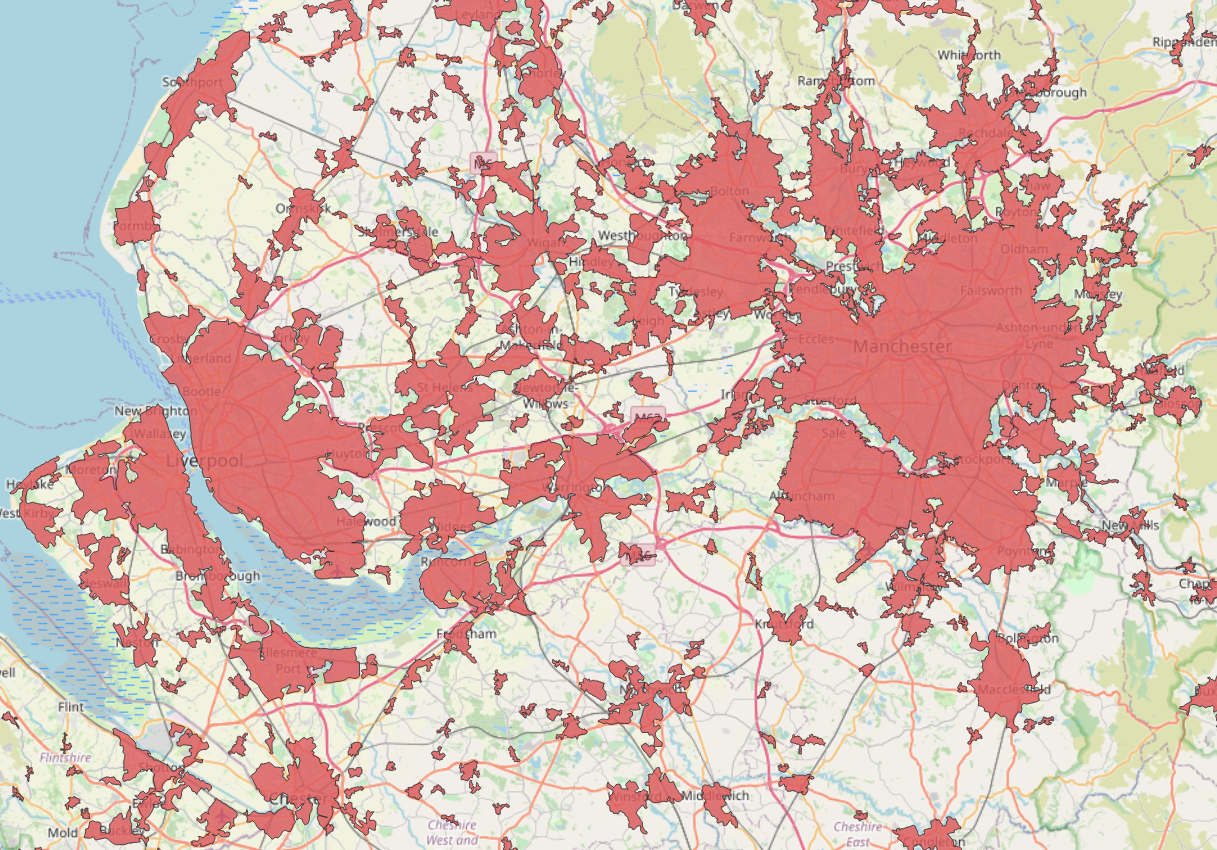
Map of built-up areas around Liverpool and Manchester

The cities of Liverpool and Manchester are about 35 miles (56 km) apart in North West England. Since the Industrial Revolution, there has been a consistent rivalry between the two cities based on economic and industrial competition. The two cities continue to be strong regional rivals in sporting and other senses.

== History ==
=== Industrialisation ===
In the Victorian era, both cities underwent substantial industrialisation. The Liverpool and Manchester Railway in 1830 was the world's first inter-city railway, and the first railway to rely exclusively on locomotives driven by steam power, with no horse-drawn traffic permitted at any time; the first to be entirely double track throughout its length; the first to have a signalling system; the first to be fully timetabled; and the first to carry mail.

Trains were hauled by company steam locomotives between the two towns, though private wagons and carriages were allowed. Cable haulage of freight trains was down the steeply-graded 1.26-mile (2.03 km) Wapping Tunnel to Liverpool Docks from Edge Hill junction. The railway was primarily built to provide faster transport of raw materials, finished goods and passengers between the Port of Liverpool and the cotton mills and factories of Manchester and surrounding towns.

The rail network of the North West's largest conurbations - Greater Manchester and Merseyside. Includes the two rapid transit systems Metrolink and Merseyrail.

Designed and built by George Stephenson, the line was financially successful, and influenced the development of railways across Britain in the 1830s. In 1845 the railway was absorbed by its principal business partner, the Grand Junction Railway (GJR), which in turn amalgamated the following year with the London and Birmingham Railway and the Manchester and Birmingham Railway to form the London and North Western Railway.

=== Manchester Ship Canal ===
Relations between the cities turned bitter after the construction of the Manchester Ship Canal in 1894 by Manchester merchants. The Mancunian merchants became disenchanted with the dues they had to pay to import and export goods to and from Manchester. Consequently, they decided to build a ship canal, which was the largest ship canal in the world upon opening in 1894, a direct response to Liverpool’s monopoly on trade. Even after the canal opening Liverpool remained Britain's largest port outside London. It held its position as leading of conventional cargo shipping well into the late 1960s, with Manchester having only won a fraction of Liverpool’s massive cotton trade by 1900; raw cotton made up 12 percent of the canal tonnage. Liverpool continued to hold its status as the “second city of the empire” and the primary gateway for global trade.

=== Road ===
In 1934, the A580 road- Liverpool- East Lancashire Road built, the United Kingdom first A road linking two cities first inter-city road.

In 1976, the M62 motorway at the Liverpool end was completed and opened, connecting Liverpool to Manchester by one motorway.

== Rivalry ==
Since the Industrial Revolution, there has been a consistent rivalry between the two cities based on economic and industrial competition. Manchester through to the 18th century was the far more populous city and was considered representative of the north. By the late 18th century, Liverpool had grown as a major shipping port – critical to the growth and success of the northern cotton mills. Over the next century, Liverpool grew to supersede Manchester and throughout the late 19th and early 20th century was often described as the British Empire's second city. The links between the two cities were strengthened with the construction of the Bridgewater Canal, the Mersey and Irwell Navigation and the world’s first inter-city railway, the Liverpool and Manchester Railway, for the transport of raw materials inland.

During the American Civil War, the two cities diverged in their response. Mancunian workers supported an embargo on slave-picked cotton to show support for Union president Abraham Lincoln; this was very costly to the city which relied heavily on the cotton trade and many mill workers faced starvation and destitution. Lincoln acknowledged the self-sacrifice in a letter he sent to the 'working men of Manchester' in 1863. Lincoln's words are inscribed on the pedestal of his statue that can still be found in Lincoln Square, Manchester. By contrast, in Liverpool it was said that there were more Confederate flags flying along the banks of the Mersey than in Virginia, and ships were built for the Confederate navy.

The rivalry is generally agreed to have ignited after the construction of the Manchester Ship Canal. Manchester merchants became disenchanted with the level of dues they had to pay to export and import their goods. The construction, funded by Manchester merchants, was opposed by Liverpool politicians and bred resentment between the two cities. The Ship Canal would become the largest in the world upon opening in January 1894 and highlighted the lengths to which merchants were prepared to go to avoid paying dues. Today, the crests of both the city of Manchester and Manchester United include stylised ships representing the Manchester Ship Canal and Manchester's trade roots. The ship is also included on the crest of many other Mancunian institutions such as Manchester City Council, Manchester United F.C. and rivals Manchester City F.C.

The Liverpool coat of arms features the mythical bird known as the 'Liver' bird. It is depicted as a cormorant. This creature formed the basis of the Liverpool FC badge.

The Manchester coat of arms formed the foundation of the original Manchester United badge and heavily influenced the Manchester City badge.

Tensions between working-class Liverpool dockers and labourers in Manchester was heightened after its completion in 1894, just three months before the first meeting between Liverpool and Newton Heath (which would later become Manchester United) in a play-off match that would see Newton Heath relegated to the Second Division. In 2001, an agreement was signed between representatives of the two cities to not compete with each other for funding in which Manchester was referenced as the regional capital city.

== Rivalry in football ==
Rivalries exist between the football clubs and supporters of Everton, Liverpool, Manchester City, and Manchester United.

=== Liverpool vs Manchester United ===
The rivalry between Liverpool and United supporters is fierce. This is partly due to the fact that Manchester United and Liverpool have dominated the English game and are the country's two most successful clubs.

=== Liverpool vs Manchester City ===
Aside from a head-to-head title race in the 1976–77 season, Liverpool and Manchester City have a newer and growing rivalry that began in the Premier League in the early 2010s, with the rivalry intensifying as the decade progressed. The two clubs competed against each other for the top four in the 2016–17 season. They also faced off in the UEFA Champions League quarter-finals in 2017–18, when Liverpool saw off Manchester City. They competed as the top two in the Premier League title for multiple seasons, first in 2013–14, and then in the historic 2018–19 season, in which the two clubs finished with 97 and 98 points, respectively (25 points above third place). Having attempted to one-up against each other throughout the mid-season until the final matchday, Manchester City ultimately won the title after defeating Brighton with a 4–1 scoreline. The sides both finished in the top two again in the 2019–20 season, with Liverpool finally winning on this occasion, as well as in the 2021–22 campaign, when Manchester City earned 93 points, one ahead of Liverpool's 92.

=== Everton vs Manchester City ===
Perhaps one of the earliest examples of a heated rivalry between the two cities emerged between Everton & Manchester City in the late 1920s and early 1930s, a rivalry heightened by City's then-all time leading goalscorer Tommy Johnson joining Everton and enjoying great success, including playing a part in the 1933 FA Cup Final victory over City. The general rivalry between the two cities has ensured the existence of the rivalry between the two clubs ever since.

=== Everton vs Manchester United ===
A significant rivalry dating back to the 1960s, the two have met in two FA Cup finals that both ended in shock wins. A ten-man Manchester United stopping newly crowned League and European Cup Winners' Cup champions Everton 1–0 in 1985. A decade later, a mid-table Everton beat a dominant United 1–0 in 1995 with a spirited defensive display. Crowd trouble has often marred fixtures. A 2005 FA Cup game at Goodison Park was described as the "worst football related violence seen in Liverpool" by Merseyside Police.

=== Cup finals between the cities' teams ===
Season	Competition	Winners	Score	Runners–up	Venue	Attendance
1932–33	FA Cup	Everton	3–0	Manchester City	Wembley Stadium (original)	92,950
1976–77	FA Cup	Manchester United	2–1	Liverpool	Wembley Stadium (original)	100,000
1982–83	EFL Cup	Liverpool	2–1 (aet)	Manchester United	Wembley Stadium (original)	99,304
1984–85	FA Cup	Manchester United	1–0 (aet)	Everton	Wembley Stadium (original)	100,000
1994–95	FA Cup	Everton	1–0	Manchester United	Wembley Stadium (original)	79,592
1995–96	FA Cup	Manchester United	1–0	Liverpool	Wembley Stadium (original)	79,007
2002–03	EFL Cup	Liverpool	2–0	Manchester United	Millennium Stadium	74,500
2015–16	EFL Cup	Manchester City	1–1 (3–1p)	Liverpool	Wembley Stadium (new)	86,206

== See also ==
- North West England#Metropolitan areas
- Liverpool and Manchester Railway
- Northwest Regional Development Agency
