= 2002–03 Football League Cup =

Worthington Cup, League Cup

Tournament details
- Country: England; Wales
- Teams: 92

Final positions
- Champions: Liverpool (7th title)
- Runners-up: Manchester United

Tournament statistics
- Top goal scorer(s): Nathan Ellington; Gary McSheffrey (5 goals)

The 2002–03 Football League Cup (known as the Worthington Cup for sponsorship reasons) was the 43rd staging of the Football League Cup, a knockout competition for England's top 92 football clubs.

The competition began on 20 August 2002, and ended with the final on 2 March 2003. The holders were Blackburn Rovers, but they were eliminated in the semi-finals by Manchester United.

The tournament was won by Liverpool, who beat Manchester United 2–0 in the final, thanks to goals from Michael Owen and Steven Gerrard.

== Preliminary round ==
A preliminary round was necessary to reduce the number of teams by one, because of the extra UEFA Cup place awarded to newly relegated Ipswich Town through the Fair Play league.

| Tie no | Home team | Score | Away team | Date |
|---|---|---|---|---|
| 1 | Bristol Rovers | 0–2 | Boston United | 20 August 2002 |

== First round ==
| Tie no | Home team | Score | Away team | Date |
|---|---|---|---|---|
| 1 | Boston United | 1–5 | Cardiff City | 11 September 2002 |
| 2 | Brighton & Hove Albion | 1–1 | Exeter City | 11 September 2002 |
Brighton win 2–1 after extra time
| 3 | Coventry City | 3–0 | Colchester United | 11 September 2002 |
| 4 | Macclesfield Town | 1–1 | Barnsley | 11 September 2002 |
Macclesfield Town win 4–1 after extra time
| 5 | Nottingham Forest | 4–0 | Kidderminster Harriers | 11 September 2002 |
| 6 | Preston North End | 1–1 | Scunthorpe United | 11 September 2002 |
Preston win 2–1 after extra time
| 7 | Sheffield Wednesday | 1–0 | Rochdale | 11 September 2002 |
| 8 | Swansea City | 2–3 | Wolverhampton Wanderers | 11 September 2002 |
| 9 | Swindon Town | 0–0 | Wycombe Wanderers | 11 September 2002 |
Wycombe Wanderers win 2–1 after extra time
| 10 | AFC Bournemouth | 3–3 | Brentford | 10 September 2002 |
3–3 after extra time — Brentford win 4–2 on penalties
| 11 | Bristol City | 0–1 | Oxford United | 10 September 2002 |
| 12 | Burnley | 3–0 | Blackpool | 10 September 2002 |
| 13 | Bury | 1–0 | Stoke City | 10 September 2002 |
| 14 | Crystal Palace | 1–1 | Plymouth Argyle | 10 September 2002 |
Crystal Palace win 2–1 after extra time
| 15 | Cambridge United | 3–1 | Reading | 10 September 2002 |
| 16 | Grimsby Town | 0–1 | Chesterfield | 10 September 2002 |
| 17 | Hartlepool United | 1–2 | Tranmere Rovers | 10 September 2002 |
| 18 | Huddersfield Town | 2–0 | Darlington | 10 September 2002 |
| 19 | Hull City | 1–1 | Leicester City | 10 September 2002 |
Leicester City win 4–2 after extra time
| 20 | Leyton Orient | 3–2 | Queens Park Rangers | 10 September 2002 |
| 21 | Lincoln City | 1–3 | Stockport County | 10 September 2002 |
| 22 | Mansfield Town | 1–3 | Derby County | 10 September 2002 |
| 23 | Northampton Town | 0–1 | Wigan Athletic | 10 September 2002 |
| 24 | Norwich City | 0–3 | Cheltenham Town | 10 September 2002 |
| 25 | Oldham Athletic | 3–2 | Notts County | 10 September 2002 |
| 26 | Port Vale | 0–2 | Crewe Alexandra | 10 September 2002 |
| 27 | Portsmouth | 2–0 | Peterborough United | 10 September 2002 |
| 28 | Rotherham United | 3–1 | Carlisle United | 10 September 2002 |
| 29 | Rushden & Diamonds | 0–0 | Millwall | 10 September 2002 |
0–0 after extra time — Rushden & Diamonds win 5–3 on penalties
| 30 | Sheffield United | 1–0 | York City | 10 September 2002 |
| 31 | Southend United | 1–4 | Wimbledon | 10 September 2002 |
| 32 | Torquay United | 0–1 | Gillingham | 10 September 2002 |
| 33 | Walsall | 1–0 | Shrewsbury Town | 10 September 2002 |
| 34 | Watford | 1–2 | Luton Town | 10 September 2002 |
| 35 | Wrexham | 2–1 | Bradford City | 10 September 2002 |

== Second round ==
| Tie no | Home team | Score | Away team | Date |
|---|---|---|---|---|
| 1 | Aston Villa | 3–0 | Luton Town | 2 October 2002 |
| 2 | Bolton Wanderers | 0–1 | Bury | 2 October 2002 |
| 3 | Crystal Palace | 7–0 | Cheltenham Town | 2 October 2002 |
| 4 | Coventry City | 8–0 | Rushden & Diamonds | 2 October 2002 |
| 5 | Derby County | 1–1 | Oldham Athletic | 2 October 2002 |
Oldham Athletic win 2–1 after extra time
| 6 | Leyton Orient | 2–3 | Birmingham City | 2 October 2002 |
| 7 | Nottingham Forest | 1–2 | Walsall | 2 October 2002 |
| 8 | Sheffield Wednesday | 1–1 | Leicester City | 2 October 2002 |
Leicester City win 2–1 after extra time
| 9 | Southampton | 6–1 | Tranmere Rovers | 2 October 2002 |
| 10 | Wigan Athletic | 3–1 | West Bromwich Albion | 2 October 2002 |
| 11 | Brentford | 1–4 | Middlesbrough | 1 October 2002 |
| 12 | Cambridge United | 0–7 | Sunderland | 1 October 2002 |
| 13 | Charlton Athletic | 0–0 | Oxford United | 1 October 2002 |
0–0 after extra time — Oxford United win 6–5 on penalties
| 14 | Chesterfield | 1–1 | West Ham | 1 October 2002 |
1–1 after extra time — West Ham win 5–4 on penalties
| 15 | Huddersfield Town | 0–1 | Burnley | 1 October 2002 |
| 16 | Macclesfield Town | 1–2 | Preston North End | 1 October 2002 |
| 17 | Manchester City | 3–2 | Crewe Alexandra | 1 October 2002 |
| 18 | Portsmouth | 1–3 | Wimbledon | 1 October 2002 |
| 19 | Rotherham United | 3–3 | Wolverhampton Wanderers | 1 October 2002 |
4–4 after extra time — Rotherham United win 4–2 on penalties
| 20 | Sheffield United | 4–1 | Wycombe Wanderers | 1 October 2002 |
| 21 | Stockport County | 1–1 | Gillingham | 1 October 2002 |
Gillingham win 2–1 after extra time
| 22 | Tottenham Hotspur | 1–0 | Cardiff City | 1 October 2002 |
| 23 | Wrexham | 0–3 | Everton | 1 October 2002 |
| 24 | Ipswich Town | 3–1 | Brighton & Hove Albion | 24 September 2002 |

== Third round ==
| Tie no | Home team | Score | Away team | Date |
|---|---|---|---|---|
| 1 | Arsenal | 2–3 | Sunderland | 6 November 2002 |
| 2 | Blackburn Rovers | 1–1 | Walsall | 6 November 2002 |
2–2 after extra time — Blackburn Rovers win 5–4 on penalties
| 3 | Burnley | 2–1 | Tottenham Hotspur | 6 November 2002 |
| 4 | Crystal Palace | 3–0 | Coventry City | 6 November 2002 |
| 5 | Chelsea | 2–1 | Gillingham | 6 November 2002 |
| 6 | Fulham | 3–1 | Bury | 6 November 2002 |
| 7 | Ipswich Town | 3–1 | Middlesbrough | 6 November 2002 |
| 8 | Liverpool | 3–1 | Southampton | 6 November 2002 |
| 9 | Newcastle United | 2–2 | Everton | 6 November 2002 |
3–3 after extra time — Everton win 3–2 on penalties
| 10 | Oxford United | 0–3 | Aston Villa | 6 November 2002 |
| 11 | Sheffield United | 2–1 | Leeds United | 6 November 2002 |
| 12 | West Ham | 0–1 | Oldham Athletic | 6 November 2002 |
| 13 | Birmingham City | 0–2 | Preston North End | 5 November 2002 |
| 14 | Wimbledon | 1–3 | Rotherham United | 5 November 2002 |
| 15 | Manchester United | 2–0 | Leicester City | 5 November 2002 |
| 16 | Wigan Athletic | 1–0 | Manchester City | 5 November 2002 |

== Fourth round ==
2002-12-04

| Aston Villa | 5–0 | Preston North End |
|---|---|---|
| Vassell 44', 55'; Dublin 80'; Ángel 84'; Hitzlsperger 87' | Report |

Villa Park, Birmingham
Attendance: 23,042
Referee: Clive Wilkes

2002-12-04

| Blackburn Rovers | 4–0 | Rotherham United |
|---|---|---|
| Yorke 12', 39'; Cole 16'; Duff 43' | Report |

Ewood Park, Blackburn
Attendance: 11,220
Referee: Matt Messias

2002-12-04

| Chelsea | 4–1 | Everton |
|---|---|---|
| Hasselbaink 26', 71'; Petit 44'; Stanić 69' | Report | Naysmith 80' |

Stamford Bridge, London
Attendance: 32,322
Referee: Paul Durkin

2002-12-04

| Liverpool | 1–1 (a.e.t.) | Ipswich Town |
|---|---|---|
| Diouf 54' (pen.) | Report | Miller 14' |

Anfield, Liverpool
Attendance: 26,305
Referee: Dermot Gallagher

2002-12-04

| Wigan Athletic | 2–1 | Fulham |
|---|---|---|
| Ellington 20', 28' | Report | Boa Morte 86' |

JJB Stadium, Wigan
Attendance: 7,615
Referee: Mark Halsey

2002-12-03

| Burnley | 0–2 | Manchester United |
|---|---|---|
| | Report | Forlán 35'; Solskjær 65' |

Turf Moor, Burnley
Attendance: 22,034
Referee: Neale Barry

2002-12-03

| Crystal Palace | 2–0 | Oldham Athletic |
|---|---|---|
| Black 11', 74' | Report |

Selhurst Park, London
Attendance: 7,431
Referee: Chris Foy

2002-12-03

| Sheffield United | 2–0 | Sunderland |
|---|---|---|
| Murphy 54'; Allison 56' | Report |

Bramall Lane, Sheffield
Attendance: 27,068
Referee: Alan Wiley

== Quarter-finals ==
2002-12-18

| Aston Villa | 3–4 | Liverpool |
|---|---|---|
| Vassell 23'; Hitzlsperger 72'; Henchoz 88' (o.g.) | Report | Murphy 27', 90'; Baroš 54'; Gerrard 67' |

Villa Park, Birmingham
Attendance: 38,530
Referee: Graham Barber

2002-12-17

| Manchester United | 1–0 | Chelsea |
|---|---|---|
| Forlán 80' | Report |

Old Trafford, Manchester
Attendance: 57,985
Referee: Steve Bennett

2002-12-17

| Sheffield United | 3–1 | Crystal Palace |
|---|---|---|
| Asaba 35'; Peschisolido 86', 88' | Report | Page 82' (o.g.) |

Bramall Lane, Sheffield
Attendance: 22,211
Referee: Eddie Wolstenholme

2002-12-17

| Wigan Athletic | 0–2 | Blackburn Rovers |
|---|---|---|
| | Report | Cole 16', 80' |

JJB Stadium, Wigan
Attendance: 16,922
Referee: Andy D'Urso

== Semi-finals ==
=== First leg ===
2003-01-08
20:00

| Sheffield United | 2–1 | Liverpool |
|---|---|---|
| Tonge 76', 82' | Report | Mellor 35' |

Bramall Lane, Sheffield
Attendance: 30,095
Referee: Mike Dean

2003-01-07
20:00

| Manchester United | 1–1 | Blackburn Rovers |
|---|---|---|
| Scholes 58' | Report | Thompson 61' |

Old Trafford, Manchester
Attendance: 62,740
Referee: Uriah Rennie

=== Second leg ===
2003-01-21
20:00

| Liverpool | 2–0 (a.e.t.) | Sheffield United |
|---|---|---|
| Diouf 9'; Owen 107' | Report |

Anfield, Liverpool
Attendance: 43,837
Referee: Alan Wiley

Liverpool win 3-2 on aggregate.

2003-01-22
20:00

| Blackburn Rovers | 1–3 | Manchester United |
|---|---|---|
| Cole 12' | Report | Scholes 30', 42'; Van Nistelrooy 77' (pen.) |

Ewood Park, Blackburn
Attendance: 29,048
Referee: Jeff Winter

Manchester United win 4–2 on aggregate

== Final ==
The 2003 Football League Cup final was played on 2 March 2003 at the Millennium Stadium in Cardiff. The game was contested between Manchester United and Liverpool. Liverpool won the game 2–0.

2003-03-02
14:00

| Manchester United | 0–2 | Liverpool |
|---|---|---|
| | Report | Gerrard 39'; Owen 86' |

Millennium Stadium, Cardiff
Attendance: 74,500
Referee: Paul Durkin (Portland)

== See also ==
- EFL Cup
- 2002–03 in English football
