= 2003 Football League Cup final =

- Match programme cover
- Event: 2002–03 Football League Cup
Liverpool	Manchester United
2	0
- Date: 2 March 2003
- Venue: Millennium Stadium, Cardiff
- Man of the Match: Jerzy Dudek (Liverpool)
- Referee: Paul Durkin (Dorset)
- Attendance: 74,500

The 2003 Football League Cup final was a football match played between Liverpool and Manchester United on 2 March 2003 at the Millennium Stadium, Cardiff. It was the final match of the 2002–03 Football League Cup, the 43rd season of the Football League Cup, a football competition for the 92 teams in the Premier League and The Football League. Liverpool were appearing in their ninth final; they had previously won six and lost two, while Manchester United were appearing in the final for the fifth time. They had previously won once and lost three times.

As both teams qualified for European football in 2002–03, they entered the competition in the third round. Liverpool's matches were generally close affairs, with only two victories secured by two goals or more. They beat Southampton 3–1 in the third round, while their match in the next round against Ipswich Town went to a penalty-shootout, which they won 5–4. Manchester United's matches were also close affairs, their biggest margin of victory of was by two goals. A 2–0 win over Burnley in the fourth round was followed by a 1–0 victory over Chelsea in the fifth round.

Watched by a crowd of 74,500, the first half was goalless until Liverpool took the lead in the 39th minute when midfielder Steven Gerrard scored. The score remained the same until the 86th minute when striker Michael Owen scored to make the score 2–0 to Liverpool. No further goals were scored and Liverpool won to secure their seventh League Cup victory.

Liverpool goalkeeper Jerzy Dudek was awarded the Alan Hardaker Trophy as man of the match. Liverpool manager Gérard Houllier praised Dudek's performance and claimed that he had a premonition that Dudek would perform well in the match. Manchester United manager Sir Alex Ferguson also praised Dudek's performance, stating, "Their goalkeeper has won them the game."

== Route to the final ==
=== Liverpool ===
Round	Opponents	Score
3rd	Southampton (h)	3–1
4th	Ipswich Town (h)	1–1 (5–4 pen)
QF	Aston Villa (a)	4–3
SF	Sheffield United (a)	1–2
SF	Sheffield United (h)	2–0 (a.e.t.)

As Liverpool were competing in the Premier League, they entered the competition in the third round and were drawn against fellow Premier League side Southampton. Despite resting a number of first-team players, Liverpool won 3–1 courtesy of goals from Patrik Berger, El-Hadji Diouf and Milan Baroš at their home ground Anfield. Their opposition in the fourth round were Ipswich Town. They took the lead in the 14th minute, in the match held at Anfield, when Tommy Miller scored. Diouf equalised in the 54th minute, but the score remained the same through full-time and extra-time to take the match to a penalty shootout. Liverpool won 5–4 to progress to the fifth round.

Fellow Premier League side Aston Villa were the opposition in the match at their home ground, Villa Park. They took the lead in the 20th minute when striker Darius Vassell scored a penalty. Midfielder Danny Murphy levelled the score seven minutes later. Liverpool took the lead in the second half when Baros scored and extended it when Steven Gerrard scored in the 67th minute. Two goals for Villa courtesy of midfielder Thomas Hitzlsperger and an own goal by defender Stéphane Henchoz levelled the score at 3–3 late in the match. However, a Murphy goal in the 90th minute of the match meant Liverpool won 4–3 to progress to the semi-finals.

Their opposition were Sheffield United of the First Division in the semi-final, which was held over two-legs. The first leg at United's home ground Bramall Lane saw Liverpool take the lead in the 36th minute when striker Neil Mellor scored. However, two goals in the second half from United midfielder Michael Tonge meant they won the match 2–1. The second leg was held at Liverpool's home ground, Anfield. Liverpool took the lead in the ninth minute when Diouf scored. This levelled the tie at 2–2 and as no further goals were scored upon reaching full-time, the match went into extra-time. Liverpool extended their lead in the 107th minute when striker Michael Owen scored. No further goals were scored in the remaining minutes of extra-time and Liverpool progressed to the final courtesy of a 3–2 aggregate victory.

=== Manchester United ===
Round	Opponents	Score
3rd	Leicester City (h)	2–0
4th	Burnley (a)	2–0
QF	Chelsea (h)	1–0
SF	Blackburn Rovers (h)	1–1
SF	Blackburn Rovers (a)	3–1

First Division side Leicester City were the opposition as United entered the competition in the third round, due to being in the Premier League. The match, held at United's home ground Old Trafford, was goalless until the 80th minute when midfielder David Beckham scored from a penalty. They extended their lead in the 90th minute when Kieran Richardson scored to win the match 2–0.

United were drawn against First Division side Burnley in the fourth round. The match held at Burnley's home ground, Turf Moor, saw United take the lead in the 35th minute when striker Diego Forlán scored. They extended their lead in the 65th minute when striker Ole Gunnar Solskjær scored to secure a 2–0 victory for United. Fellow Premier League side Chelsea were the opposition in the quarter-final. A goal in the 80th minute by striker Forlán was enough to secure a 1–0 victory and progression to the semi-final.

United were drawn against fellow Premier League side Blackburn Rovers in the semi-final. The first leg at Old Trafford was goalless in the first half, but United took the lead in the 58th minute when midfielder Paul Scholes scored. However, three minutes later Blackburn equalised when David Thompson scored. The match finished at 1–1. The second leg held at Blackburn's home ground, Ewood Park, saw them take the lead when striker Andy Cole scored early in the match. However, United responded and two goals from Scholes in the remainder of the first half gave United the lead. They scored a third in the second half when striker Ruud van Nistelrooy converted a penalty. United won the match 3–1 and progressed to the final after winning the tie 4–2.

== Match ==
=== Background ===
Liverpool were appearing in their ninth final they had won six (1981, 1982, 1983, 1984, 1995, 2001) and lost two (1978, 1987). This was Manchester United's fifth appearance in the final. They had won once in 1992 and lost three times in 1983, 1991 and 1994. The teams had met once before in the 1983 final, a match which Liverpool won 2–1. The last match between the two sides before the final was on 1 December 2002, which United won 2–1 courtesy of goals from striker Diego Forlán. Both sides last match before the final was in European competition. Liverpool beat French team Auxerre 2–0 in the second leg of their 2002–03 UEFA Cup fourth round tie, while United beat Italian team Juventus 3–0 in the second group stage of the 2002–03 UEFA Champions League.

Liverpool midfielder Vladimír Šmicer was looking forward to playing a part in the final: "Everyone wants to play in the final, I'm no different. I was just happy to be on the pitch against Auxerre because I didn't know even the day before whether I'd be fit enough after my injury problem. I'm still not 100% fit, I just wanted to train well this week and be fit for the final." Šmicer was hopeful that victory in the final would rescue Liverpool's season: "I hope that this re-ignites our season. Our season is not good, we know, but there is still plenty to play for. We have not said this is a bad season, let's forget about it and concentrate on the next one, we have been criticised and we are intent on responding on the pitch." Liverpool midfielder Danny Murphy was eager to win the match: "Winning in Cardiff would be a massive result for us, we have to be honest, we haven't been as good as Manchester United over the last 10 years. And winning would bring European football next year, which isn't guaranteed at the moment."

Manchester United manager Sir Alex Ferguson revealed that captain Roy Keane would return to his midfield role after playing in central defence in their win over Juventus: "It took Roy about 15 minutes to settle into Tuesday's game but once he started to make sure he could see his opponent, he grasped the role very quickly, in the end, he could have played with a bowler hat and white gloves on it was so easy for him. He is a marvellous player and choosing him in defence is certainly an option but Mikaël Silvestre and John O'Shea should be fit and I have a back four in my mind." The final was United's first since the 1999 UEFA Champions League Final and Ferguson was determined to win: That is too long for us, and we are delighted. We have always looked at the League Cup as an extra to blood young players, but the format now has encouraged teams to have a go. We've played Liverpool once in Cardiff – in the Charity Shield – and lost so I hope this time it will be a different result."

Both sides had injury concerns heading into the final. Liverpool defender Stéphane Henchoz was a doubt after he suffered a thigh injury in Liverpool's win over Auxerre. However, Liverpool midfielder Šmicer had recovered from an ankle problem and would be available for selection. United had a number of injury concerns. Wes Brown, Scholes and Ryan Giggs were all doubts for the final, after they had picked up knocks in the week before the final. They would also be without striker Diego Forlán, who had injured his ankle against Juventus, however, defender Mikaël Silvestre was declared fit to start.

=== First half ===
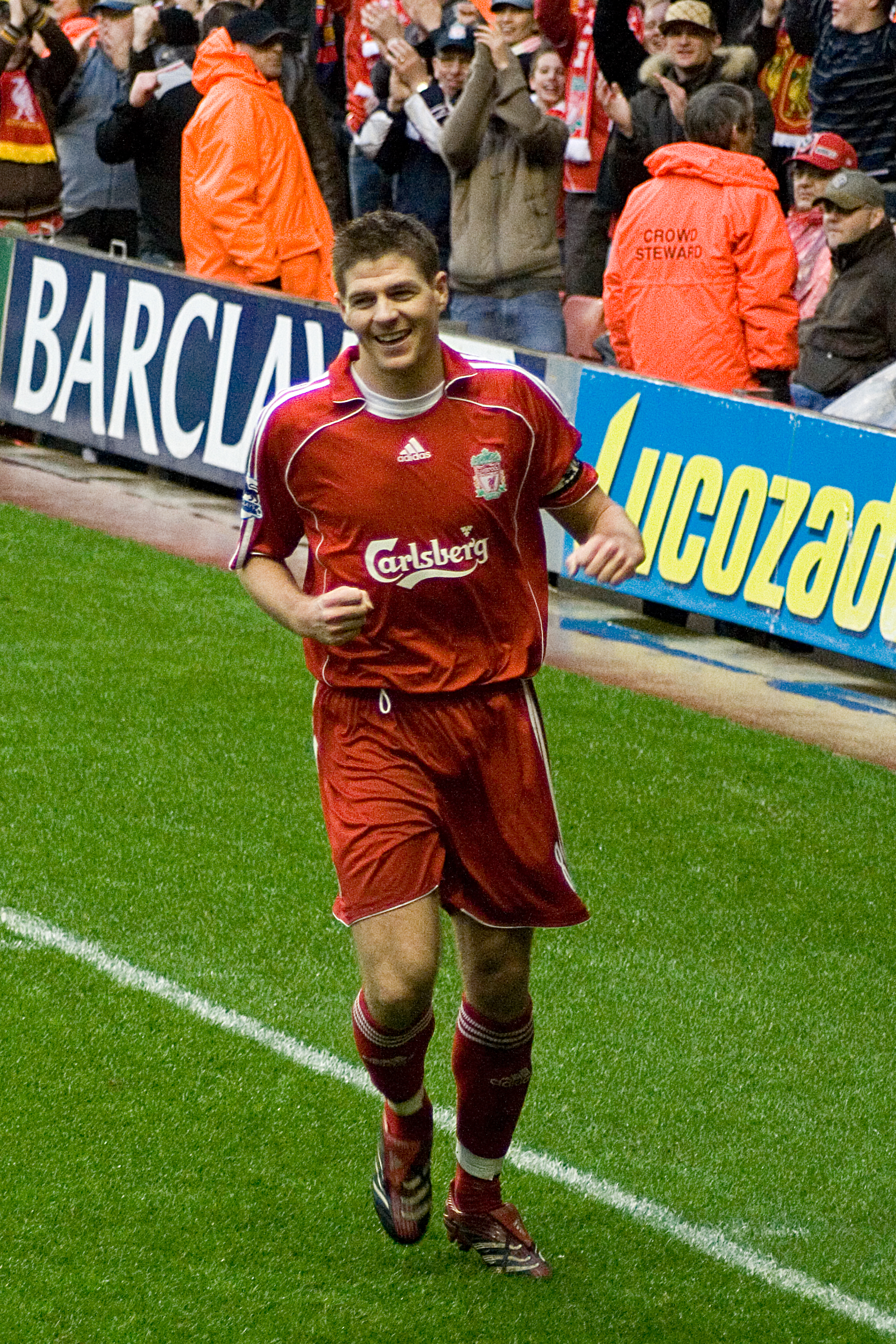
Steven Gerrard (pictured in 2007), scorer of Liverpool's first goal.

Liverpool kicked off the match and they had first chance of the match in the fourth minute, but the free-kick by midfielder Murphy was caught by United goalkeeper Fabien Barthez. Defender Henchoz was shown a yellow card in the 12th minute and United midfielder Giggs had the first shot of the match, which was saved by Liverpool goalkeeper Jerzy Dudek. Twice in the next few minutes, Liverpool had chances from moves down the right-hand side of the pitch. On both occasions, however, the pass into the penalty area was intercepted. United had a chance to score in the 20th minute. Keane passed to Scholes, who found Giggs on the left-hand side of the pitch. His cross into the penalty area found striker Ruud van Nistelrooy, but his shot went wide of the Liverpool goal.

Liverpool began to get a foothold in the match after 30 minutes, their best chance came in the 36th minute when a shot by Murphy went over the crossbar. Three minutes later, their approach paid off as they scored. A long-range shot from Steven Gerrard deflected off United midfielder David Beckham and into the United goal to give Liverpool a 1–0 lead. Three minutes after the goal, United had a chance to equalise: A shot by midfielder Juan Sebastián Verón was saved by Dudek, but the ball rebounded to Scholes, but his subsequent shot was blocked by Henchoz. After a free-kick by Beckham just before half-time was saved by Dudek, Liverpool counter-attacked through midfielder El Hadji Diouf down the right-hand side of the pitch, though his subsequent cross into the penalty area was intercepted by Keane.

=== Second half ===
Almost immediately after the restart, Liverpool had the first attack. Striker Michael Owen went past United defender Brown, but he was unable to shoot when the ball got stuck in between his feet. A minute later, Liverpool had an appeal for a penalty after striker Emile Heskey went down in the United penalty area, but referee Paul Durkin did not award a penalty. They had another chance in the 52nd minute after an exchange of passes between Murphy and Heskey, but Murphy's shot went over the bar. United began to exert more pressure on Liverpool after this. A minute later a shot by Keane was blocked by Liverpool defender Sami Hyypiä. The ball went out for a United, which resulted in a throw-in, that was headed into the arms of Dudek. Five minutes later, Van Nistelrooy had a chance to score as he turned and shot at the Liverpool goal, but it was saved by Dudek. Heskey was replaced by striker Milan Baroš following an injury.

United had another chance in the 66th minute when Verón crossed from the right-hand side of the pitch to Scholes, but his shot was saved by Dudek. A Liverpool attack in the 72nd minute ended after Baros put the ball out for a goal-kick. From the subsequent kick, Barthez found Giggs, who ran through the middle of the pitch, but his pass to Beckham was intercepted by Liverpool. United subsequently replaced Brown with striker Ole Gunnar Solskjær. United had an appeal for a penalty in the 77th minute when Scholes went down near Liverpool midfielder Dietmar Hamann, but Durkin turned down the appeal. Minutes later, Van Nistelrooy had another chance to score, but his shot from inside the Liverpool penalty area was saved by Dudek. Five minutes later, Liverpool scored through Owen. A pass by Silvestre was intercepted by Liverpool, Hamann passed to Owen, who beat Barthez to give Liverpool a 2–0 lead. Four minutes later, Liverpool had a chance to extend their lead, but Šmicer, who had replaced Baroš, missed the target. No further goals were scored and Liverpool won 2–0 to win the League Cup for the seventh time.

=== Details ===
2 March 2003
14:00 GMT

Liverpool	2–0	Manchester United
Gerrard 39'; Owen 86'	Report

Millennium Stadium, Cardiff
Attendance: 74,500
Referee: Paul Durkin (Dorset)

Liverpool	Manchester United

GK	1	(Poland) Jerzy Dudek
RB	23	(England) Jamie Carragher
CB	2	(Switzerland) Stéphane Henchoz	(yellow card) 13'
CB	4	(Finland) Sami Hyypiä (c)
LB	18	(Norway) John Arne Riise
RM	9	(Senegal) El Hadji Diouf		(substituted off) 90'
CM	16	(Germany) Dietmar Hamann
CM	17	(England) Steven Gerrard
LM	13	(England) Danny Murphy
CF	10	(England) Michael Owen
CF	8	(England) Emile Heskey		(substituted off) 61'
Substitutes:
GK	19	(France) Pegguy Arphexad
DF	30	(Mali) Djimi Traoré
MF	7	(Czech Republic) Vladimír Šmicer			(substituted on) 89'
MF	25	(Croatia) Igor Bišćan		(substituted on) 90'
FW	5	(Czech Republic) Milan Baroš		(substituted on) 61'	(substituted off) 89'
Manager:
(France) Gérard Houllier

GK	1	(France) Fabien Barthez
RB	2	(England) Gary Neville
CB	24	(England) Wes Brown	(substituted off) 74'
CB	6	(England) Rio Ferdinand
LB	27	(France) Mikaël Silvestre
RM	7	(England) David Beckham
CM	16	(Republic of Ireland) Roy Keane (c)
CM	4	(Argentina) Juan Sebastián Verón
LM	11	(Wales) Ryan Giggs
SS	18	(England) Paul Scholes
CF	10	(Netherlands) Ruud van Nistelrooy
Substitutes:
GK	13	(Northern Ireland) Roy Carroll
DF	3	(England) Phil Neville
MF	8	(England) Nicky Butt
MF	22	(Republic of Ireland) John O'Shea
FW	20	(Norway) Ole Gunnar Solskjær	(substituted on) 74'
Manager:
(Scotland) Sir Alex Ferguson

Man of the match

- Jerzy Dudek (Liverpool)

Match rules

- 90 minutes
- 30 minutes of extra-time if necessary
- Penalty shootout if scores still level
- Five named substitutes
- Maximum of three substitutions

== Post-match ==
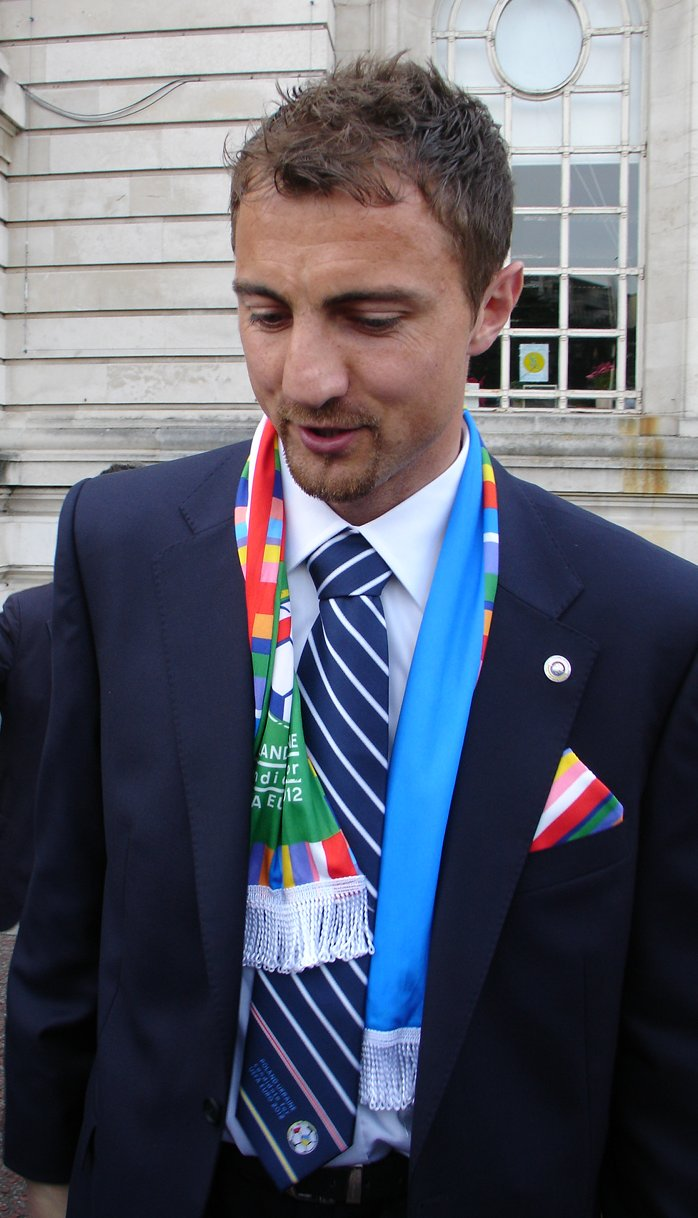
The performance of Liverpool goalkeeper Jerzy Dudek was highlighted by both managers

Following the match, Liverpool manager Gérard Houllier claimed he had a premonition that goalkeeper Dudek would be the hero of the final: "I told Jerzy three days ago 'I can feel you will be the hero. You were too unlucky when we played them, today he was man of the match. But football can be like that. Sometimes you can be at the bottom and then be a hero again. I just had a feeling. I'm a great believer that when you have the right attitude everything else follows. He had a good run after the World Cup but then he made some mistakes and we had to support him. The squad get on very well. There was no finger-pointing after that game. He has saved us before in games and we had to keep faith in him." Houllier also praised Manchester United manager Sir Alex Ferguson: "I wished him the best in the Champions League because he represents the best in English football, he congratulated every Liverpool player after the final whistle and that shows that he is not just a great manager but a great man."

United manager Ferguson also praised Dudek's performance in the match: "Their goalkeeper has won them the game, sometimes you just have to put your hands up on these occasions. Dudek has won them the cup. He deserved to be man of the match. We didn't get a break. Dudek's performance encouraged them to stay near their penalty box. In tough games like that the first goal is very important. It's a test for us. We can either accept defeat or we can fight back." Captain Keane was disappointed with the defeat: "The players, managers, staff are all upset but I suppose nowhere near as bad as the fans, if you don't win a match in football you feel as though you have let the fans down." His focus turned to United's participation in the UEFA Champions League, as they looked to end the season with a trophy: "It would have been nice to get a piece of silverware in the cabinet, especially with the opposition being Liverpool, we've just got to lick our wounds. We've got a game against Leeds on Wednesday and we'll get on with training for Wednesday. The players know we'll have to get together, get ready and try to keep the pressure on Arsenal. But we are eight points behind them, which puts them in a very strong position and again we are pinning our hopes on the European Cup, which is a dangerous game to play as we saw last season."
