= 2005–06 Bolton Wanderers F.C. season =

Bolton Wanderers
2005–06 season
- Chairman: Phil Gartside
- Manager: Sam Allardyce
- Stadium: Reebok Stadium
- FA Premier League: 8th
- FA Cup: 5th round
- League Cup: 5th round
- UEFA Cup: Round of 32
- Top goalscorer: League: Stelios Giannakopoulos; Kevin Nolan (9); All: Stelios Giannakopoulos (12)
- Highest home attendance: 27,718 (vs. Manchester United, 1 April 2006)
- Lowest home attendance: 10,927 (vs. West Ham United, 26 October 2005)
- Average home league attendance: 25,265
Home colours	Away colours

The 2005–06 season was the 128th season in Bolton Wanderers F.C.'s existence and their fifth consecutive year in the top-flight. This article covers the period from 1 July 2005 to 30 June 2006.

Having finished sixth the previous season, Bolton had qualified for the UEFA Cup for the first time in their history.

== Season summary ==
In June 2005, Allardyce's assistant Phil Brown left Bolton to take up the challenge of managing Derby County and he was replaced by coach Sammy Lee.

Off the field, with Bolton looking to get into Europe for the second successive season, Allardyce was being linked with the England manager's job. He was interviewed for the England manager vacancy during the Spring, though the news broke that the FA wanted Brazilian Luiz Felipe Scolari. In the end it came down to Allardyce or Steve McClaren. Between the middle of March and the beginning of April with rumours surrounding Allardyce in terms of taking the England job, Bolton's form hit an unexpected slump with five successive defeats seeing the side slide to eighth.

== First-team squad ==
Squad at end of season

Note: Flags indicate national team as defined under FIFA eligibility rules; some limited exceptions apply. Players may hold more than one non-FIFA nationality.

No.	Pos.	Nation	Player
1	GK	OMA	Ali Al Habsi
2	DF	ENG	Nicky Hunt
4	MF	ENG	Kevin Nolan (captain from November)
5	DF	FRA	Bruno Ngotty
6	MF	WAL	Gary Speed
7	MF	GRE	Stelios Giannakopoulos
8	MF	ESP	Iván Campo
9	FW	DEN	Henrik Pedersen
10	MF	NGA	Jay-Jay Okocha (captain until November)
11	DF	JAM	Ricardo Gardner
12	GK	ENG	Ian Walker
14	FW	ENG	Kevin Davies
15	DF	TUN	Radhi Jaïdi
16	MF	JPN	Hidetoshi Nakata

No.	Pos.	Nation	Player
17	FW	ENG	Matt Jansen
18	FW	MEX	Jared Borgetti
20	FW	POR	Ricardo Vaz Tê
21	FW	SEN	El Hadji Diouf
22	GK	FIN	Jussi Jääskeläinen
24	MF	IRL	Joey O'Brien
25	DF	SEN	Abdoulaye Faye
26	DF	ISR	Tal Ben Haim
32	DF	POL	Jarosław Fojut
33	FW	USA	Johann Smith
39	MF	SEN	Khalilou Fadiga
42	MF	ENG	Robert Sissons
43	GK	ENG	Sam Ashton

=== Left club during season ===
Note: Flags indicate national team as defined under FIFA eligibility rules; some limited exceptions apply. Players may hold more than one non-FIFA nationality.

No. / Pos. / Nation / Player; 17 / DF / FRA / Martin Djetou (released)	No. / Pos. / Nation / Player; 23 / MF / FRA / Fabrice Fernandes (released)

== Reserve squad ==
Note: Flags indicate national team as defined under FIFA eligibility rules; some limited exceptions apply. Players may hold more than one non-FIFA nationality.

No.	Pos.	Nation	Player
27	FW	FRA	Bédi Buval
29	MF	ESP	Óscar Pérez
30	GK	ENG	Chris Howarth

No.	Pos.	Nation	Player
31	MF	ENG	James Sinclair
35	MF	AUS	Scott Jamieson

== Competitions ==
=== Premier League ===
==== Final league table ====
Pos	Team	Pld	W	D	L	GF	GA	GD	Pts	Qualification or relegation
6	Blackburn Rovers	38	19	6	13	51	42	+9	63	Qualification for the UEFA Cup first round (Note: Since Manchester United qualified for the Champions League, their place in the UEFA Cup as League Cup winners passed down to the league and was awarded to Blackburn Rovers as the highest-placed team not already qualified for European competitions.)
7	Newcastle United	38	17	7	14	47	42	+5	58	Qualification for the Intertoto Cup third round
8	Bolton Wanderers	38	15	11	12	49	41	+8	56	
9	West Ham United	38	16	7	15	52	55	−3	55	Qualification for the UEFA Cup first round (Note: Since Liverpool had already qualified for the Champions League, their UEFA Cup berth as the FA Cup winners went to West Ham, who were the FA Cup runners-up.)
10	Wigan Athletic	38	15	6	17	45	52	−7	51	

Source: Barclays Premier League
Rules for classification: 1) points; 2) goal difference; 3) number of goals scored.

==== Results by matchday ====
Matchday	1	2	3	4	5	6	7	8	9	10	11	12	13	14	15	16	17	18	19	20	21	22	23	24	25	26	27	28	29	30	31	32	33	34	35	36	37	38
Ground	A	H	H	A	H	A	H	A	A	H	A	H	A	A	H	H	A	A	A	H	A	H	A	H	A	H	A	H	H	A	H	A	H	A	H	A	H	H
Result	D	L	W	W	D	W	W	L	L	W	W	W	L	L	W	D	W	D	L	D	D	W	D	D	D	W	L	W	W	L	L	L	L	D	W	L	D	W
Position	8	13	7	5	5	4	4	5	7	7	7	4	5	7	6	5	5	5	7	8	8	8	8	8	8	6	8	7	7	7	7	7	8	9	8	8	8	8

Source: Statto.com
A = Away; H = Home; W = Win; D = Draw; L = Loss

==== Matches ====
13 August 2005	Aston Villa	2–2	Bolton Wanderers	Villa Park
15:00	Phillips 4'; Davis 9'	Report	Davies 6'; Campo 8'	Attendance: 33,263; Referee: Mike Riley

21 August 2005	Bolton Wanderers	0–1	Everton	Reebok Stadium
13:30		Report	Bent 52'	Attendance: 25,608; Referee: Alan Wiley

24 August 2005	Bolton Wanderers	2–0	Newcastle United	Reebok Stadium
20:00	Diouf 37'; Stelios 50'	Report		Attendance: 25,904; Referee: Steve Tanner

27 August 2005	West Ham United	1–2	Bolton Wanderers	Boleyn Ground
15:00	Sheringham 90' (pen.)	Report	Nolan 59'; Campo 85'	Attendance: 25,904; Referee: Phil Dowd

11 September 2005	Bolton Wanderers	0–0	Blackburn Rovers	Reebok Stadium
16:00		Report		Attendance: 24,405; Referee: Graham Poll

18 September 2005	Manchester City	0–1	Bolton Wanderers	City of Manchester Stadium
16:00		Report	Speed 90' (pen.)	Attendance: 43,137; Referee: Andy D'Urso

24 September 2005	Bolton Wanderers	1–0	Portsmouth	Reebok Stadium
17:15	Nolan 25'	Report		Attendance: 23,134; Referee: Mark Clattenburg

2 October 2005	Wigan Athletic	2–1	Bolton Wanderers	JJB Stadium
13:00	Camara 48'; McCulloch 63'	Report	Jaïdi 68'	Attendance: 20,553; Referee: Alan Wiley

15 October 2005	Chelsea	5–1	Bolton Wanderers	Stamford Bridge
15:00	Drogba 52', 61'; Lampard 55', 59'; Guðjohnsen 74'	Report	Stelios 5'	Attendance: 41,775; Referee: Rob Styles

23 October 2005	Bolton Wanderers	2–0	West Bromwich Albion	Reebok Stadium
15:00	Nakata 81'; Nolan 90'	Report		Attendance: 24,151; Referee: Rob Styles

29 October 2005	Charlton Athletic	0–1	Bolton Wanderers	The Valley
15:00		Report	Nolan 72'	Attendance: 26,175; Referee: Mark Clattenburg

7 November 2005	Bolton Wanderers	1–0	Tottenham Hotspur	Reebok Stadium
20:00	Nolan 32'	Report		Attendance: 26,634; Referee: Howard Webb

27 November 2005	Fulham	2–1	Bolton Wanderers	Craven Cottage
14:00	McBride 4', 18'	Report	Legwinski 90+2' (o.g.)	Attendance: 19,768; Referee: Graham Poll

3 December 2005	Bolton Wanderers	2–0	Arsenal	Reebok Stadium
15:00	Faye 20'; Stelios 32'	Report		Attendance: 26,792; Referee: Howard Webb

10 December 2005	Bolton Wanderers	1–1	Aston Villa	Reebok Stadium
15:00	Diouf 82'	Report	Ángel 88'	Attendance: 23,646; Referee: Phil Dowd

17 December 2005	Everton	0–4	Bolton Wanderers	Goodison Park
15:00		Report	Davies 32'; Stelios 75', 80'; Speed 79' (pen.)	Attendance: 34,500; Referee: Alan Wiley

26 December 2005	Sunderland	0–0	Bolton Wanderers	Stadium of Light
15:00		Report		Attendance: 32,232; Referee: Martin Atkinson

31 December 2005	Manchester United	4–1	Bolton Wanderers	Old Trafford
15:00	Ngotty 8' (o.g.); Saha 44'; Ronaldo 68', 90+1'	Report	Speed 33'	Attendance: 67,858; Referee: Steve Bennett

2 January 2006	Bolton Wanderers	2–2	Liverpool	Reebok Stadium
15:00	Jaïdi 10'; Diouf 71'		Gerrard 67' (pen.); García 82'	Attendance: 27,604; Referee: Mark Clattenburg

14 January 2006	Blackburn Rovers	0–0	Bolton Wanderers	Ewood Park
17:45				Attendance: 18,180; Referee: Mike Riley

21 January 2006	Bolton Wanderers	2–0	Manchester City	Reebok Stadium
15:00	Borgetti 37'; Nolan 41'			Attendance: 26,466; Referee: Rob Styles

1 February 2006	Portsmouth	1–1	Bolton Wanderers	Fratton Park
19:45	Karadas 86'		Fadiga 69'	Attendance: 19,128; Referee: Dermot Gallagher

4 February 2006	Bolton Wanderers	1–1	Wigan Athletic	Reebok Stadium
15:00	Stelios 63'		Johansson 77'	Attendance: 25,854; Referee: Steve Bennett

11 February 2006	Arsenal	1–1	Bolton Wanderers	Highbury Stadium
15:00	Gilberto 90+3'		Nolan 12'	Attendance: 38,193; Referee: Howard Webb

26 February 2006	Bolton Wanderers	2–1	Fulham	Reebok Stadium
15:00	Helguson 45+1' (o.g.); Nolan 68'		Helguson 22'	Attendance: 23,104; Referee: Phil Dowd

4 March 2006	Newcastle United	3–1	Bolton Wanderers	St James' Park
15:00	Solano 34'; Shearer 45'; Ameobi 70'		Davies 72'	Attendance: 52,012; Referee: Alan Wiley

11 March 2006	Bolton Wanderers	4–1	West Ham United	Reebok Stadium
15:00	Stelios 12', 33'; Speed 45+2'; Pedersen 81'		Sheringham 79'	Attendance: 24,461; Referee: Mike Dean

18 March 2006	Bolton Wanderers	2–0	Sunderland	Reebok Stadium
15:00	Davies 47'; Nolan 85'			Attendance: 23,568; Referee: Phil Dowd

26 March 2006	Middlesbrough	4–3	Bolton Wanderers	Riverside Stadium
13:30	Hasselbaink 8' (pen.), 47'; Viduka 30'; Parnaby 90+2'		Stelios 3'; Okocha 58'; Jaïdi 81'	Attendance: 25,971; Referee: Howard Webb

1 April 2006	Bolton Wanderers	1–2	Manchester United	Reebok Stadium
15:00	Davies 26'		Saha 33'; Van Nistelrooy 79'	Attendance: 27,718; Referee: Alan Wiley

4 April 2006	Birmingham City	1–0	Bolton Wanderers	St Andrew's
19:45	Jarošík 37'			Attendance: 26,493; Referee: Chris Foy

9 April 2006	Liverpool	1–0	Bolton Wanderers	Anfield
14:00	Fowler 45+2'			Attendance: 44,194; Referee: Rob Styles

15 April 2006	Bolton Wanderers	0–2	Chelsea	Reebok Stadium
12:45			Terry 44'; Lampard 59'	Attendance: 27,266; Referee: Phil Dowd

17 April 2006	West Bromwich Albion	0–0	Bolton Wanderers	The Hawthorns
20:00				Attendance: 23,181; Referee: Dermot Gallagher

22 April 2006	Bolton Wanderers	4–1	Charlton Athletic	Reebok Stadium
15:00	Vaz Tê 14'; Davies 21', 89'; Borgetti 89'		Bent 76' (pen.)	Attendance: 24,713; Referee: Uriah Rennie

30 April 2006	Tottenham Hotspur	1–0	Bolton Wanderers	White Hart Lane
16:00	Lennon 60'			Attendance: 36,179; Referee: Alan Wiley

3 May 2006	Bolton Wanderers	1–1	Middlesbrough	Reebok Stadium
20:00	Vaz Tê 51'	Report	Johnson 47'	Attendance: 22,733; Referee: Howard Webb

7 May 2006	Bolton Wanderers	1–0	Birmingham City	Reebok Stadium
15:00	Vaz Tê 65'	Report		Attendance: 26,275; Referee: Steve Bennett

=== FA Cup ===
7 January 2006 Third round	Watford	0–3	Bolton Wanderers	Vicarage Road
15:00		Report	Borgetti 10'; Stelios 34'; Vaz Tê 73'	Attendance: 13,239; Referee: Uriah Rennie

28 January 2006 Fourth round	Bolton Wanderers	1–0	Arsenal	Reebok Stadium
17:40	Stelios 84'	Report		Attendance: 13,326; Referee: Mike Dean

18 February 2006 Fifth round	Bolton Wanderers	0–0	West Ham United	Reebok Stadium
15:00		Report		Attendance: 17,120; Referee: Chris Foy

15 March 2006 Fifth round replay	West Ham United	2–1 (a.e.t.)	Bolton Wanderers	Boleyn Ground
20:05	Jääskeläinen 10' (o.g.); Harewood 96'	Report	Davies 31'	Attendance: 24,685 (400 away); Referee: Mark Clattenburg

=== Football League Cup ===
26 October 2005 Third round	Bolton Wanderers	1–0	West Ham United	Reebok Stadium
20:00	Borgetti 64'	Report		Attendance: 10,927; Referee: Andre Marriner

30 November 2005 Fourth round	Bolton Wanderers	2–1 (a.e.t.)	Leicester City	Reebok Stadium
20:00	Borgetti 104'; Vaz Tê 106'	Report	Williams 110'	Attendance: 13,067; Referee: Steve Bennett

20 December 2005 Fifth round	Wigan Athletic	2–0	Bolton Wanderers	JJB Stadium
19:45	Roberts 40', 45+3'	Report		Attendance: 13,401; Referee: Mike Dean

=== UEFA Cup ===
==== First round ====
15 September 2005 First round, first leg	Bolton Wanderers	2–1	(Bulgaria) Lokomotiv Plovdiv	Reebok Stadium
20:10	Diouf 72'; Borgetti 90'	Report	Jančevski 28'	Attendance: 19,723; Referee: Darko Ceferin

29 September 2005 First round, second leg	Lokomotiv Plovdiv (Bulgaria)	1–2	Bolton Wanderers	Stadium Lokomotiv
17:55	Iliev 51'	Report	Tunchev 79' (o.g.); Nolan 86'	Attendance: 14,000 (2,000 away); Referee: Jouni Hyytia

==== Group stage ====
===== Table =====
Pos	Team	Pld	W	D	L	GF	GA	GD	Pts	Qualification	SEV	ZEN	BOL	BJK	VIT
1	(Spain) Sevilla	4	2	1	1	8	4	+4	7	Advance to knockout stage	—	—	—	3–0	3–1
2	(Russia) Zenit Saint Petersburg	4	2	1	1	5	4	+1	7	Advance to knockout stage	2–1	—	—	—	2–1
3	(England) Bolton Wanderers	4	1	3	0	4	3	+1	6	Advance to knockout stage	1–1	1–0	—	—	—
4	(Turkey) Beşiktaş	4	1	2	1	5	6	−1	5		—	1–1	1–1	—	—
5	(Portugal) Vitória de Guimarães	4	0	1	3	4	9	−5	1		—	—	1–1	1–3	—

===== Matches =====
20 October 2005	Beşiktaş (Turkey)	1–1	Bolton Wanderers	Inonu Stadium
19:45	Aílton 7'	Report	Borgetti 29'	Attendance: 17,027 (300 away); Referee: Ruud Bossen

3 November 2005	Bolton Wanderers	1–0	(Russia) Zenit St. Petersburg	Reebok Stadium
20:00	Nolan 24'	Report		Attendance: 15,905; Referee: Matteo Trefoloni

24 November 2005	Guimarães (Portugal)	1–1	Bolton Wanderers	Estádio D. Afonso Henriques
20:00	Saganowski 86'	Report	Vaz Tê 88'	Attendance: 20,000 (3,000 away); Referee: Laurent Duhamel

14 December 2005	Bolton Wanderers	1–1	(Spain) Sevilla	Reebok Stadium
19:45	Ngotty 65'	Report	Adriano 74'	Attendance: 15,623; Referee: Michael Weiner

==== Knockout stage ====
15 February 2006 Round of 32, first leg	Bolton Wanderers	0–0	(France) Marseille	Reebok Stadium
19:45				Attendance: 19,288; Referee: Olegário Benquerença

23 February 2006 Round of 32, second leg	Marseille (France)	2–1 (2–1 agg.)	Bolton Wanderers	Stade Vélodrome
19:45	Ribéry 45+2'; Ben Haim 68' (o.g.)		Stelios 25'	Referee: Massimo Busacca

== Statistics ==
=== Appearances ===
Bolton used a total of 26 players during the season.

P	Player	Position	PL	FAC	LC	UC	Total
1	(Finland) Jussi Jääskeläinen	Goalkeeper	38 (0)	3 (0)	2 (0)	5 (1)	48 (0)
2	(Israel) Tal Ben Haim	Defender	33 (3)	4 (0)	3 (0)	7 (0)	47 (3)
3	(England) Kevin Davies	Forward	37 (0)	3 (0)	2 (0)	4 (1)	46 (1)
4	(England) Kevin Nolan	Midfielder	36 (1)	3 (0)	2 (0)	4 (3)	45 (4)
5	(Greece) Stelios Giannakopoulos	Midfielder	29 (6)	4 (0)	2 (0)	6 (0)	41 (6)
6	(Jamaica) Ricardo Gardner	Defender/Midfielder	28 (3)	4 (0)	3 (0)	6 (1)	41 (4)
7	(Wales) Gary Speed	Midfielder	30 (2)	2 (0)	2 (0)	2 (3)	36 (5)
8	(France) Bruno Ngotty	Defender	28 (2)	2 (0)	0 (1)	6 (1)	36 (4)
9	(Senegal) Abdoulaye Faye	Defender/Midfielder	23 (4)	1 (0)	2 (0)	7 (0)	33 (4)
10	(Republic of Ireland) Joey O'Brien	Defender/Midfielder	22 (1)	3 (0)	2 (0)	6 (0)	33 (1)
11	(Nigeria) Jay-Jay Okocha	Midfielder	19 (9)	3 (0)	1 (1)	6 (1)	29 (11)
12	(Japan) Hidetoshi Nakata	Midfielder	15 (7)	3 (0)	2 (0)	5 (1)	20 (2)
13	(Tunisia) Radhi Jaïdi	Defender	16 (1)	2 (1)	3 (0)	3 (0)	19 (2)
14	(Senegal) El Hadji Diouf	Forward	17 (4)	0 (0)	0 (1)	4 (2)	19 (0)
15	(Denmark) Henrik Pedersen	Forward	16 (6)	0 (1)	0 (1)	2 (1)	18 (9)
16	(England) Nicky Hunt	Defender	12 (8)	1 (1)	1 (0)	2 (0)	16 (9)
17	(Mexico) Jared Borgetti	Forward	5 (15)	2 (2)	1 (1)	4 (3)	12 (21)
18	(Senegal) Khalilou Fadiga	Midfield	5 (3)	1 (0)	1 (1)	2 (0)	10 (4)
19	(Spain) Iván Campo	Defender/Midfielder	7 (7)	1 (0)	0 (1)	1 (0)	9 (8)
20	(Portugal) Ricardo Vaz Tê	Forward	6 (16)	1 (3)	1 (1)	0 (4)	8 (24)
21	(England) Ian Walker	Goalkeeper	0 (0)	1 (0)	1 (0)	3 (0)	5 (0)
22	(England) Matt Jansen	Forward	3 (3)	0 (1)	0 (0)	0 (0)	3 (4)
23	(France) Fabrice Fernandes	Midfielder	0 (1)	0 (0)	1 (0)	2 (1)	3 (2)
24	(France) Martin Djetou	Defender	1 (2)	0 (0)	1 (1)	0 (0)	2 (3)
25	(Poland) Jarosław Fojut	Defender	0 (1)	0 (1)	0 (0)	0 (0)	0 (2)
26	(England) Sam Ashton	Goalkeeper	0 (0)	0 (1)	0 (0)	0 (0)	0 (1)

=== Top scorers ===
P	Player	Position	PL	FAC	LC	UC	Total
1	(Greece) Stelios Giannakopoulos	Midfielder	9	2	0	1	12
2	(England) Kevin Nolan	Midfielder	9	0	0	2	11
3	(England) Kevin Davies	Striker	7	1	0	0	8
4	(Mexico) Jared Borgetti	Striker	2	1	2	2	7
5	(Portugal) Ricardo Vaz Tê	Striker	3	1	1	1	6
