= 2006–07 Bolton Wanderers F.C. season =

Bolton Wanderers
2006–07 season
- Chairman: Phil Gartside
- Manager: Sam Allardyce (until 29 April); Sammy Lee (from 30 April)
- Stadium: Reebok Stadium
- Premier League: 7th
- FA Cup: Fourth round
- League Cup: Fourth round
- Top goalscorer: League: Nicolas Anelka (11); All: Nicolas Anelka (12)
- Highest home attendance: 27,229 (vs. Manchester United, 28 October)
- Lowest home attendance: 21,088 (vs. Arsenal, 14 February)
Home colours	Away colours

2006–07 was Bolton Wanderers Football Club's eighth season in the Premier League, and their sixth consecutive season in the top division of English football and covers the period from 1 July 2006 to 30 June 2007. Their failure to win the Premier League title made it the 68th time that they have competed at the top level of English football without winning the title, the most of any club.

== Premier League ==
Bolton overcame the previous season's disappointment of failing to qualify for Europe and finished in seventh, enough for UEFA Cup football. Bolton had spent much of the season challenging for a Champions League and had peaked as high as third, but for a club of Bolton's size and resources to be challenging at the top end of the table was something for Bolton supporters to be proud of.

Three games before the end of the season, manager Sam Allardyce announced his resignation as Bolton manager and was replaced by Sammy Lee for the final three games of the season.

=== Results summary ===
Overall								Home						Away					
Pld	W	D	L	GF	GA	GD	Pts	W	D	L	GF	GA	GD	W	D	L	GF	GA	GD
38	16	8	14	47	52	−5	56	9	5	5	26	20	+6	7	3	9	21	32	−11

Last updated: 30 January 2019.
Source: 11v11

=== Results per matchday ===
Matchday	1	2	3	4	5	6	7	8	9	10	11	12	13	14	15	16	17	18	19	20	21	22	23	24	25	26	27	28	29	30	31	32	33	34	35	36	37	38
Ground	H	A	A	H	H	A	H	A	A	H	H	A	A	H	H	A	H	A	A	H	H	A	H	A	H	A	H	A	H	A	H	A	H	A	H	A	A	H
Result	W	D	L	W	D	W	W	W	W	L	L	D	L	W	L	L	W	W	W	W	W	L	D	L	D	W	W	L	L	L	W	W	D	L	L	D	L	D
Position	3	4	7	6	7	6	2	3	3	3	3	4	6	3	4	8	5	5	5	4	3	4	5	5	5	5	5	5	5	5	5	5	5	5	6	5	6	7

Updated to match(es) played on 13 May 2007. Source: Statto.com
A = Away; H = Home; W = Win; D = Draw; L = Loss

19 August 2006	Bolton Wanderers	2–0	Tottenham Hotspur	Reebok Stadium
17:15	Davies 9'; Campo 13'	Report	Young-Pyo (yellow card) 73'	Attendance: 22,899; Referee: Phil Dowd

23 August 2006	Fulham	1–1	Bolton Wanderers	Craven Cottage
20:00	Bullard 90' (pen.)	Report	Diouf 73' (pen.)	Attendance: 18,559; Referee: Alan Wiley

26 August 2006	Charlton Athletic F.C.	2–0	Bolton Wanderers	The Valley
15:00	D. Bent 65' (pen.), 85'	Report		Attendance: 23,638; Referee: Mike Dean

9 September 2006	Bolton Wanderers	1–0	Watford	Reebok Stadium
	Speed 90' (pen.)	Report		Attendance: 21,140; Referee: Mark Clattenburg

16 September 2006	Bolton Wanderers	0–0	Middlesbrough	Reebok Stadium
		Report		Attendance: 21,164; Referee: Steve Bennett

25 September 2006	Portsmouth	0–1	Bolton Wanderers	Fratton Park
		Report	Nolan 22'	Attendance: 19,105; Referee: Uriah Rennie

30 September 2006	Bolton Wanderers	2–0	Liverpool	Reebok Stadium
	Speed 30'; Campo 51'	Report		Attendance: 25,061; Referee: Phil Dowd

15 October 2006	Newcastle United	1–2	Bolton Wanderers	St James' Park
	Ameobi 19' (pen.)	Report	Diouf 55', 57'	Attendance: 48,145; Referee: Alan Wiley

22 October 2006	Blackburn Rovers	0–1	Bolton Wanderers	Ewood Park
		Report	Campo 62'	Attendance: 27,662; Referee: Mike Dean

28 October 2006	Bolton Wanderers	0–4	Manchester United	Reebok Stadium
		Report	Rooney 10', 16', 89'; Ronaldo 82'	Attendance: 27,229; Referee: Rob Styles

4 November 2006	Bolton Wanderers	0–1	Wigan Athletic	Reebok Stadium
		Report	McCulloch 79'	Attendance: 21,255; Referee: Mark Clattenburg

11 November 2006	Sheffield United	2–2	Bolton Wanderers	Bramall Lane
	Hulse 70'; Kazim-Richards 73'	Report	Diouf 34'; Davies 59'	Attendance: 28,294; Referee: Alan Wiley

18 November 2006	Everton	1–0	Bolton Wanderers	Goodison Park
	Arteta 60'	Report		Attendance: 34,417; Referee: Uriah Rennie

25 November 2006	Bolton Wanderers	3–1	Arsenal	Reebok Stadium
	Faye 9'; Anelka 45', 76'	Report	Gilberto 45'	Attendance: 24,409; Referee: Mike Dean

29 November 2006	Bolton Wanderers	0–1	Chelsea	Reebok Stadium
		Report	Ballack 45'	Attendance: 23,559; Referee: Steve Bennett

2 December 2006	Reading	1–0	Bolton Wanderers	Madejski Stadium
	Doyle 33'	Report		Attendance: 23,556; Referee: Alan Wiley

9 December 2006	Bolton Wanderers	4–0	West Ham United	Reebok Stadium
	Davies 17', 52'; Diouf 77'; Anelka 78'	Report		Attendance: 22,283; Referee: Howard Webb

16 December 2006	Aston Villa	0–1	Bolton Wanderers	Villa Park
		Report	Speed 75' (pen.)	Attendance: 27,450; Referee: Mark Clattenburg

23 December 2006	Manchester City	0–2	Bolton Wanderers	City of Manchester Stadium
		Report	Anelka 8', 25'	Attendance: 40,157; Referee: Mike Riley

26 December 2006	Bolton Wanderers	2–1	Newcastle United	Reebok Stadium
	Ramage 32' (o.g.); Anelka 57'	Report	Dyer 8'	Attendance: 26,437; Referee: Howard Webb

30 December 2006	Bolton Wanderers	3–2	Portsmouth	Reebok Stadium
	Faye 30'; Campo 40'; Anelka 62'	Report	Taylor 2'; Cole 89'	Attendance: 22,447; Referee: Peter Walton

1 January 2007	Liverpool	3–0	Bolton Wanderers	Anfield
	Crouch 61'; Gerrard 63'; Kuyt 83'	Report		Attendance: 41,370; Referee: Graham Poll

13 January 2007	Bolton Wanderers	0–0	Manchester City	Reebok Stadium
		Report		Attendance: 22,334; Referee: Andre Marriner

20 January 2007	Middlesbrough	5–1	Bolton Wanderers	Riverside Stadium
	Speed 6' (o.g.); Xavier 10'; Viduka 23', 84'; Downing 43'	Report	Nolan 25'	Attendance: 24,614; Referee: Alan Wiley

31 January 2007	Bolton Wanderers	1–1	Charlton Athletic	Reebok Stadium
20:00	Pedersen 6'	Report	El Karkouri 12'	Attendance: 22,357; Referee: Lee Probert

3 February 2007	Watford	0–1	Bolton Wanderers	Vicarage Road
		Report	Nicolas Anelka 63'	Attendance: 18,722; Referee: Rob Styles

11 February 2007	Bolton Wanderers	2–1	Fulham	Reebok Stadium
13:30	Speed 23' (pen.); Nolan 51'	Report	Knight 66'	Attendance: 24,919; Referee: Howard Webb

25 February 2007	Tottenham Hotspur	4–1	Bolton Wanderers	White Hart Lane
	Keane 11', 22'; Jenas 19'; Lennon 90'	Report	Speed 37' (pen.)	Attendance: 35,747; Referee: Graham Poll

4 March 2007	Bolton Wanderers	1–2	Blackburn Rovers	Reebok Stadium
	Anelka 87'	Report	McCarthy 58' (pen.), 68' (pen.)	Attendance: 21,743; Referee: Rob Styles

17 March 2007	Manchester United	4–1	Bolton Wanderers	Old Trafford
	Park 14', 25'; Rooney 17', 74'	Report	Speed 87' (pen.)	Attendance: 76,058; Referee: Alan Wiley

31 March 2007	Bolton Wanderers	1–0	Sheffield United	Reebok Stadium
	Davies 80'	Report		Attendance: 24,312; Referee: Mark Clattenburg

7 April 2007	Wigan Athletic	1–3	Bolton Wanderers	JJB Stadium
	Heskey 32'	Report	Anelka 44'; Andranik 68', 73'	Attendance: 18,610; Referee: Uriah Rennie

9 April 2007	Bolton Wanderers	1–1	Everton	Reebok Stadium
	Davies 18'	Report	Vaughan 33'	Attendance: 25,179; Referee: Martin Atkinson

14 April 2007	Arsenal	2–1	Bolton Wanderers	Emirates Stadium
	Rosický 31'; Fàbregas 46'	Report	Anelka 11'	Attendance: 60,101; Referee: Rob Styles

21 April 2007	Bolton Wanderers	1–3	Reading	Reebok Stadium
	Shorey 64' (o.g.)	Report	Doyle 84' (pen.), 89'; S.Hunt 90'	Attendance: 23,533; Referee: Howard Webb

28 April 2007	Chelsea	2–2	Bolton Wanderers	Stamford Bridge
	Kalou 22'; Jääskeläinen 34' (o.g.)	Report	Michalik 19'; Davies 54'	Attendance: 41,105; Referee: Rob Styles

5 May 2007	West Ham United	3–1	Bolton Wanderers	Boleyn Ground
	Tevez 10', 21'; Noble 29'	Report	Speed 67'	Attendance: 34,404; Referee: Mike Riley

13 May 2007	Bolton Wanderers	2–2	Aston Villa	Reebok Stadium
	Speed 32'; Davies 58'	Report	Gardner 37'; Moore 81'	Attendance: 26,255; Referee: Mark Clattenburg

== Final league table ==
Pos	Team	Pld	W	D	L	GF	GA	GD	Pts	Qualification or relegation
5	Tottenham Hotspur	38	17	9	12	57	54	+3	60	Qualification for the UEFA Cup first round (Note: Since both finalists of the FA Cup (Manchester United and Chelsea) and the League Cup winners (Chelsea) were qualified for the Champions League, their UEFA Cup spots were given to the 6th- and 7th-placed Premier League teams.)
6	Everton	38	15	13	10	52	36	+16	58	Qualification for the UEFA Cup first round
7	Bolton Wanderers	38	16	8	14	47	52	−5	56	Qualification for the UEFA Cup first round
8	Reading	38	16	7	15	52	47	+5	55	
9	Portsmouth	38	14	12	12	45	42	+3	54	

Source: Premier League
Rules for classification: 1) points; 2) goal difference; 3) number of goals scored.

== FA Cup ==
5 January 2007 R3	Doncaster Rovers	0–4	Bolton Wanderers	Keepmoat Stadium
		Report	Davies 8'; Andranik 22', 49'; Tal 33'	Attendance: 14,297; Referee: Dermot Gallagher

28 January 2007 R4	Arsenal	1–1	Bolton Wanderers	Emirates Stadium
16:00	Touré 78'	Report	Nolan 50'	Attendance: 59,778; Referee: Mike Dean

14 February 2007 R4 replay	Bolton Wanderers	1–3 (a.e.t.)	Arsenal	Reebok Stadium
	Méïté 90'	Report	Adebayor 13', 120'; Ljungberg 108'	Attendance: 21,088; Referee: Chris Foy

== League Cup ==
19 September 2006 R2	Walsall	1–3	Bolton Wanderers	Bescot Stadium
	Butler 74'	Report	Nolan 68'; Campo 88'; Anelka 90'	Attendance: 6,243; Referee: Andy D'Urso

25 October 2006 R3	Charlton Athletic	1–0	Bolton Wanderers	The Valley
	M. Bent 17'	Report		Attendance: 10,788; Referee: Dermot Gallagher

== First-team squad ==
Squad at end of season

Note: Flags indicate national team as defined under FIFA eligibility rules; some limited exceptions apply. Players may hold more than one non-FIFA nationality.

No.	Pos.	Nation	Player
1	GK	OMA	Ali Al Habsi
2	DF	ENG	Nicky Hunt
4	MF	ENG	Kevin Nolan (captain)
5	DF	CIV	Abdoulaye Méïté
6	MF	WAL	Gary Speed
7	MF	GRE	Stelios Giannakopoulos
8	MF	ESP	Iván Campo
9	FW	DEN	Henrik Pedersen
11	MF	JAM	Ricardo Gardner
12	GK	ENG	Ian Walker
14	FW	ENG	Kevin Davies
15	MF	ENG	David Thompson
16	MF	IRN	Andranik Teymourian
17	MF	RSA	Quinton Fortune
20	FW	POR	Ricardo Vaz Tê
21	FW	SEN	El Hadji Diouf

No.	Pos.	Nation	Player
22	GK	FIN	Jussi Jääskeläinen
23	MF	ISR	Idan Tal
24	MF	IRL	Joey O'Brien
25	DF	SEN	Abdoulaye Faye
26	DF	ISR	Tal Ben Haim
27	DF	ESP	César
28	DF	SVK	Ľubomír Michalík
29	FW	SVK	Zoltán Harsányi
30	GK	ENG	Chris Howarth
37	MF	ENG	James Sinclair
39	FW	FRA	Nicolas Anelka
41	DF	POL	Jarosław Fojut
42	FW	USA	Johann Smith
44	DF	POL	Błażej Augustyn
45	DF	ENG	Robert Sissons
46	MF	AUS	Scott Jamieson

=== Left club during season ===
Note: Flags indicate national team as defined under FIFA eligibility rules; some limited exceptions apply. Players may hold more than one non-FIFA nationality.

No.	Pos.	Nation	Player
18	FW	MEX	Jared Borgetti (to Al-Ittihad)

== Transfers in ==
Date	Position	Name	Club From	Fee
1 July 2006	MF	(Israel) Idan Tal	(Israel) Maccabi Haifa	Free
14 July 2006	DF	(Ivory Coast) Abdoulaye Méïté	(France) Marseille	Undisclosed
26 July 2006	MF	(South Africa) Quinton Fortune	Manchester United	Free
25 August 2006	FW	(France) Nicolas Anelka	(Turkey) Fenerbahce SK	£8,000,000
29 August 2006	MF	(Iran) Andranik Teymourian	(Iran) FC Aboomoslem	Undisclosed
26 January 2007	DF	(Slovakia) Ľubomír Michalík	FC Senec	Undisclosed
26 January 2007	FW	(Slovakia) Zoltán Harsányi	FC Senec	Loan
31 January 2007	MF	David Thompson	Portsmouth	Nominal
20 February 2007	DF	(Spain) César Martín	Free Agency	Free

== Transfers out ==
Date	Position	Name	Club To	Fee
30 June 2006	MF	(Nigeria) Jay-Jay Okocha	Free Agency	Released
30 June 2006	DF	(France) Bruno Ngotty	Free Agency	Released
30 June 2006	FW	Matt Jansen	Free Agency	Released
30 June 2006	MF	(Senegal) Khalilou Fadiga	Free Agency	Released
30 June 2006	MF	(Spain) Oscar Perez	Free Agency	Released
31 July 2006	DF	Radhi Jaïdi	Birmingham City	£2,000,000

== Squad statistics ==
No.	Pos.	Name	League		FA Cup		League Cup		Total		Discipline	
No.	Pos.	Name	Apps	Goals	Apps	Goals	Apps	Goals	Apps	Goals	Yellow card	Red card
1	GK	(Oman) Ali Al-Habsi	0	0	0	0	0	0	0	0	0	0
2	DF	(England) Nicky Hunt	33	0	2	0	2	0	37	0	3	0
4	MF	(England) Kevin Nolan	31	3	2	1	1	1	34	5	10	1
5	DF	(Ivory Coast) Abdoulaye Méïté	35	0	3	1	2	0	40	1	4	0
6	DF	(Wales) Gary Speed	38	8	2	0	2	0	42	8	4	0
7	MF	(Greece) Stelios Giannakopoulos	23	0	3	0	2	0	28	0	1	0
8	MF	(Spain) Iván Campo	34	4	2	0	2	1	38	5	12	1
9	FW	(Denmark) Henrik Pedersen	18	1	2	0	1	0	21	1	1	0
11	MF	(Jamaica) Ricardo Gardner	18	0	3	0	0	0	21	0	6	0
12	GK	(England) Ian Walker	0	0	1	0	2	0	3	0	0	0
14	FW	(England) Kevin Davies	30	8	2	1	1	0	33	9	10	1
15	MF	(England) David Thompson	8	0	0	0	0	0	8	0	3	0
16	MF	(Iran) Andranik Teymourian	17	2	2	2	2	0	21	4	1	0
17	DF	(South Africa) Quinton Fortune	6	0	1	0	0	0	7	0	3	0
20	FW	(Portugal) Ricardo Vaz Tê	25	0	3	0	2	0	30	0	0	0
21	FW	(Senegal) El Hadji Diouf	33	5	1	0	1	0	35	5	7	1
22	GK	(Finland) Jussi Jääskeläinen	38	0	2	0	0	0	40	0	3	0
23	MF	(Israel) Idan Tal	16	0	2	1	2	0	20	1	1	0
24	DF	(Republic of Ireland) Joey O'Brien	0	0	0	0	0	0	0	0	0	0
25	DF	(Senegal) Abdoulaye Faye	32	2	2	0	0	0	34	2	10	0
26	DF	(Israel) Tal Ben Haim	32	0	1	0	1	0	33	0	11	1
27	DF	(Spain) César Martín	1	0	0	0	0	0	1	0	0	0
28	DF	(Slovakia) Ľubomír Michalík	4	1	0	0	0	0	4	1	1	0
29	FW	(Slovakia) Zoltán Harsányi	0	0	0	0	0	0	0	0	0	0
30	GK	(England) Chris Howarth	0	0	0	0	0	0	0	0	0	0
37	MF	(England) James Sinclair	2	0	0	0	0	0	2	0	2	0
39	FW	(France) Nicolas Anelka	35	11	3	0	1	1	39	12	1	0
41	DF	(Poland) Jarosław Fojut	0	0	0	0	2	0	2	0	0	0
42	FW	(United States) Johann Smith	1	0	1	0	1	0	3	0	2	0
44	DF	(Poland) Błażej Augustyn	0	0	1	0	0	0	1	0	0	0
45	MF	(England) Robert Sissons	0	0	0	0	0	0	0	0	0	0
46	DF	(Australia) Scott Jamieson	0	0	0	0	0	0	0	0	0	0
–	–	Own goals	–	2	–	0	–	0	–	2		

Statistics accurate as of match played 13 May 2007
