= Wiley (name) =

Wiley is a name. It may refer to:

== Given name ==
- Wiley Brooks (1936–2016), founder of the Breatharian Institute of America
- Wiley Young Daniel (1946–2019), American judge
- Wiley Lynn (1888–1932), American prohibition agent, known for killing Bill Tilghman
- Wiley Miller (born 1951), pen name of American newspaper cartoonist David Wiley Miller
- Wiley Nickel (born 1975), American politician
- Wiley Post (1898–1935), American aviator, the first person to fly solo around the world
- Wiley Rutledge (1894–1949), American jurist, Supreme Court justice
- Wiley Scribner (1840–1889), American politician
- Wiley Wiggins (born 1976), American game designer and actor

== Surname ==
- Alan Wiley (born 1960), British football referee
- Alexander Wiley (1884–1967), U.S. Senator
- Austin Wiley (born 1999), American basketball player
- Autrey Nell Wiley (1901–1990), American literary critic
- Cliff Wiley (born 1955), American track and field athlete
- Charles Wiley (disambiguation), several people
- D'Extra Wiley (fl. 1990s), American R&B singer, artist and producer, songwriter
- Daniel Day Wiley (1837–1893), American Union brevet brigadier general
- David Wiley (disambiguation), multiple people
- Don Craig Wiley (1944–2001), American crystallographer
- Geeshie Wiley (1908–1950), American blues singer of the early 1930s
- Gerald Wiley, nom-de-plume of Ronnie Barker (1929–2005)
- Grace Olive Wiley (1883–1948), American herpetologist best known for her work with venomous snakes
- Harvey Washington Wiley (1844–1930), American chemist
- Isaac William Wiley (1825–1924), American physician and Methodist bishop, founder of Wiley College, Texas
- Jacob Wiley (born 1994), American basketball player
- Janet Wiley (1933–2010), All-American Girls Professional Baseball League player
- Jared Wiley (born 2000), American football player
- John Cooper Wiley (1893–1967), American ambassador
- John D. Wiley (born 1942), Chancellor of UW-Madison
- Kehinde Wiley (born 1977), American artist
- Laura I. Wiley (fl. 1990s–2010s), American politician
- Lee Wiley (1908–1975), American jazz singer of the 1930s
- Marcellus Wiley (born 1974), American football player
- Maya Wiley (born 1964), American civil rights activist, lawyer, and politician
- Michael Wiley (disambiguation), multiple people
- Morlon Wiley (born 1966), American basketball player and coach
- Nathan Wiley (born c. 1977), Canadian musician
- Henry Orton Wiley (1877–1961), American Nazarene theologian
- Ralph Wiley (1952–2004), American sports journalist
- Ralph Wiley, chemist who accidentally discovered PVDC in 1933
- Richard E. Wiley (born 1934), American lawyer and former Chairman of the Federal Communications
- Robert Wiley (born 1955), Australian rules footballer
- Samira Wiley (born 1987), American actor and model
- Stephen B. Wiley (1929–2015), American attorney, businessman, poet, and politician
- Susan "Genie" Wiley (born 1957), American feral child
- Wanda Wiley (1901–1987), American actress in silent films
- William Wiley, American sailor in the First Barbary War and namesake of the USS Wiley
- William H. Wiley (1842–1925), Representative to United States Congress from New Jersey and Publisher
- William T. Wiley (1937–2021), American artist

== See also ==
- Wiley (musician), British grime MC, rapper, and producer
- Wylie § People
