= 2005–06 Football League Cup =

Carling Cup, League Cup

Tournament details
- Country: England; Wales
- Teams: 92

Final positions
- Champions: Manchester United (2nd title)
- Runners-up: Wigan Athletic

Tournament statistics
- Top goal scorer(s): Louis Saha (6 goals)

The 2005–06 Football League Cup (known as the Carling Cup for sponsorship reasons) was the 46th staging of the Football League Cup, a knock-out competition for the top 92 football clubs played in English football league system. The competition name reflects a sponsorship deal with lager brand Carling.

The competition began on 22 August 2005, and ended with the final on 26 February 2006 at the Millennium Stadium in Cardiff while reconstruction work was still ongoing at Wembley Stadium.

The tournament was won by Manchester United, who beat surprise finalists Wigan Athletic 4–0 in the final, thanks to two goals from Wayne Rooney and one each from Cristiano Ronaldo and Louis Saha. Wigan had only been promoted to the Premier League at the beginning of the season.

== First round ==
The 72 Football League clubs compete from the first round. Each section is divided equally into a pot of seeded clubs and a pot of unseeded clubs. Clubs' rankings depend upon their finishing position in the 2004–05 season. Therefore, the clubs relegated from the Premier League in 2005, Norwich City, Crystal Palace and Southampton, were the top seeds, and the clubs newly promoted to the Football League, Barnet and Carlisle United, were bottom seeds.

- On 28 June 2005 seeded clubs and unseeded clubs were paired off to create the first-round draw.
- Matches occurred on 22, 23 and 24 August 2005.
- Extra time played when the scores were level after 90 minutes.
- A penalty shoot-out took place if the scores were level after extra time.

Tie no	Home team	Score^{1}	Away team	Date
1	Chesterfield	2–4	Huddersfield Town	24 August 2005
2	Colchester United	0–2	Cardiff City	24 August 2005
3	Derby County	0–1	Grimsby Town	24 August 2005
4	Rushden & Diamonds	0–3	Coventry City	24 August 2005
5	Torquay United	0–0	AFC Bournemouth	24 August 2005
0–0 after extra time — AFC Bournemouth win 4 – 3 on penalties
6	Blackpool	2–1	Hull City	23 August 2005
7	Bristol City	2–4	Barnet	23 August 2005
8	Burnley	2–1	Carlisle United	23 August 2005
9	Bury	0–3	Leicester City	23 August 2005
10	Crystal Palace	3–0	Walsall	23 August 2005
11	Cheltenham Town	5–0	Brentford	23 August 2005
12	Gillingham	1–0	Oxford United	23 August 2005
13	Hartlepool United	3–1	Darlington	23 August 2005
14	Ipswich Town	0–2	Yeovil Town	23 August 2005
15	Leeds United	2–0	Oldham Athletic	23 August 2005
16	Leyton Orient	1–3	Luton Town	23 August 2005
17	Lincoln City	5–1	Crewe Alexandra	23 August 2005
18	MK Dons	0–1	Norwich City	23 August 2005
19	Mansfield Town	1–1	Stoke City	23 August 2005
1–1 after extra time — Mansfield Town win 3 – 0 on penalties
20	Millwall	2–0	Bristol Rovers	23 August 2005
21	Northampton Town	3–0	Queens Park Rangers	23 August 2005
22	Nottingham Forest	2–3	Macclesfield Town	23 August 2005
23	Plymouth Argyle	2–1	Peterborough United	23 August 2005
24	Preston North End	1–1	Barnsley	23 August 2005
2–2 after extra time — Barnsley win 5 – 4 on penalties
25	Reading	3–1	Swansea City	23 August 2005
26	Rochdale	0–5	Bradford City	23 August 2005
27	Rotherham United	3–1	Port Vale	23 August 2005
28	Scunthorpe United	2–1	Tranmere Rovers	23 August 2005
29	Sheffield United	1–0	Boston United	23 August 2005
30	Shrewsbury Town	3–2	Brighton & Hove Albion	23 August 2005
31	Stockport County	2–4	Sheffield Wednesday	23 August 2005
32	Swindon Town	1–3	Wycombe Wanderers	23 August 2005
33	Watford	3–1	Notts County	23 August 2005
34	Wolverhampton Wanderers	5–1	Chester City	23 August 2005
35	Wrexham	0–1	Doncaster Rovers	23 August 2005
36	Southend United	0–3	Southampton	22 August 2005

== Second round ==
The 36 winners from the first round joined the 12 Premier League clubs not participating in European competition in round two. The draw was made on 27 August. The matches occurred on 20 and 21 September.

Tie no	Home team	Score^{1}	Away team	Date
1	Blackburn Rovers	3–1	Huddersfield Town	21 September 2005
2	Doncaster Rovers	1–1	Manchester City	21 September 2005
1–1 after extra time — Doncaster Rovers win 3 – 0 on penalties
3	Fulham	5–4	Lincoln City	21 September 2005
4	Barnet	2–1	Plymouth Argyle	20 September 2005
5	Burnley	3–0	Barnsley	20 September 2005
6	Crystal Palace	1–0	Coventry City	20 September 2005
7	Cardiff City	2–1	Macclesfield Town	20 September 2005
8	Charlton Athletic	3–1	Hartlepool United	20 September 2005
9	Gillingham	3–2	Portsmouth	20 September 2005
10	Grimsby Town	1–0	Tottenham Hotspur	20 September 2005
11	Leicester City	2–1	Blackpool	20 September 2005
12	Mansfield Town	1–0	Southampton	20 September 2005
13	Norwich City	2–0	Northampton Town	20 September 2005
14	Reading	1–0	Luton Town	20 September 2005
15	Rotherham United	0–2	Leeds United	20 September 2005
16	Scunthorpe United	0–2	Birmingham City	20 September 2005
17	Sheffield Wednesday	2–4	West Ham United	20 September 2005
18	Shrewsbury Town	0–0	Sheffield United	20 September 2005
0–0 after extra time — Sheffield United win 4 – 3 on penalties
19	Sunderland	1–0	Cheltenham Town	20 September 2005
20	Watford	2–1	Wolverhampton Wanderers	20 September 2005
21	West Bromwich Albion	4–1	Bradford City	20 September 2005
22	Wigan Athletic	1–0	AFC Bournemouth	20 September 2005
23	Wycombe Wanderers	3–8	Aston Villa	20 September 2005
24	Yeovil Town	1–2	Millwall	20 September 2005

== Third round ==
The 24 winners from the second round joined the eight Premier League clubs participating in European competition in round three. The draw was made on 24 September. Matches were played on 25 and 26 October.

Tie no	Home team	Score^{1}	Away team	Date
1	Birmingham City	2–1	Norwich City	26 October 2005
2	Bolton Wanderers	1–0	West Ham United	26 October 2005
3	Cardiff City	0–1	Leicester City	26 October 2005
4	Chelsea	1–1	Charlton Athletic	26 October 2005
1–1 after extra time — Charlton Athletic win 5 – 4 on penalties
5	Everton	0–1	Middlesbrough	26 October 2005
6	Grimsby Town	0–1	Newcastle United	26 October 2005
7	Manchester United	4–1	Barnet	26 October 2005
8	Aston Villa	1–0	Burnley	25 October 2005
9	Blackburn Rovers	3–0	Leeds United	25 October 2005
10	Crystal Palace	2–1	Liverpool	25 October 2005
11	Doncaster Rovers	2–0	Gillingham	25 October 2005
12	Fulham	2–3	West Bromwich Albion	25 October 2005
13	Mansfield Town	2–3	Millwall	25 October 2005
14	Reading	2–0	Sheffield United	25 October 2005
15	Sunderland	0–3	Arsenal	25 October 2005
16	Wigan Athletic	3–0	Watford	25 October 2005

== Fourth round ==
The draw for the fourth round was made on 29 October 2005 and matches were played on 29 and 30 November. Doncaster caused the shock of the round, beating Aston Villa 3-0.

30 November 2005

Bolton Wanderers	2–1 (a.e.t.)	Leicester City
Borgetti 104'; Vaz Tê 106'		Williams 110'

Reebok Stadium, Bolton
Attendance: 13,067
Referee: Dermot Gallagher

30 November 2005

Charlton Athletic	2–3	Blackburn Rovers
Ambrose 37'; Murphy 50'		Kuqi 75'; Thompson 81'; Bentley 88'

The Valley, London
Attendance: 14,093
Referee: Peter Walton

30 November 2005

Manchester United	3–1	West Brom
Ronaldo 12' (pen.); Saha 16'; O'Shea 56'		Ellington 77'

Old Trafford, Manchester
Attendance: 48,924
Referee: Mark Clattenburg

30 November 2005

Middlesbrough	2–1	Crystal Palace
Viduka 52'; Németh 55'		Queudrue 31' (o.g.)

Riverside Stadium, Middlesbrough
Attendance: 10,791
Referee: Howard Webb

30 November 2005

Wigan Athletic	1–0	Newcastle United
Connolly 88' (pen.)

JJB Stadium, Wigan
Attendance: 11,574
Referee: Steve Bennett

29 November 2005

Arsenal	3–0	Reading
Reyes 12'; Van Persie 42'; Lupoli 65'

Highbury, London
Attendance: 36,167
Referee: Lee Mason

29 November 2005

Doncaster Rovers	3–0	Aston Villa
McIndoe 20' (pen.); Heffernan 53'; Thornton 79'

Belle Vue, Doncaster
Attendance: 10,590
Referee: Mike Dean

29 November 2005

Millwall	2–2 (a.e.t.)	Birmingham City
Dunne 57'; Elliott 116'		Gray 10'; Heskey 102'
Penalties
	3–4

The New Den, London
Attendance: 7,732
Referee: Graham Poll

== Quarter-finals ==
The draw for the quarter-finals was made on 3 December 2005 and matches were played on 20 and 21 December. The only non-Premier League club, Doncaster Rovers gave Arsenal a scare by drawing 2–2 after extra-time but Arsenal made it through 3–1 on penalties

21 December 2005

Doncaster Rovers	2–2 (a.e.t.)	Arsenal
McIndoe 2'; Green 104'		Owusu-Abeyie 63'; Gilberto 120'
Penalties
	1–3

Belle Vue, Doncaster
Attendance: 10,006
Referee: Phil Dowd

21 December 2005

Middlesbrough	0–1	Blackburn Rovers
		Dickov 90'

Riverside Stadium, Middlesbrough
Attendance: 14,710
Referee: Alan Wiley

20 December 2005

Birmingham City	1–3	Manchester United
Jarošík 75'		Saha 46', 63'; Park 50'

St Andrew's, Birmingham
Attendance: 20,454
Referee: Mark Halsey

20 December 2005

Wigan Athletic	2–0	Bolton Wanderers
Roberts 40', 45'

JJB Stadium, Wigan
Attendance: 13,401
Referee: Mike Dean

== Semi-finals ==
The semi-final draw was made on 21 December 2005 after the conclusion of the quarter-finals. Unlike the other rounds, the semi-final ties were played over two legs, with each team playing one leg at home. The ties were played in the weeks beginning 9 January and 23 January 2006.

=== First leg ===
10 January 2006
19:45

Wigan Athletic	1–0	Arsenal
Scharner 78'

JJB Stadium, Wigan
Attendance: 12,181
Referee: Howard Webb (S. Yorkshire)

11 January 2006
20:00

Blackburn Rovers	1–1	Manchester United
Pedersen 35'		Saha 30'

Ewood Park, Blackburn
Attendance: 24,348
Referee: Rob Styles (Hampshire)

=== Second leg ===
24 January 2006
19:45

Arsenal	2–1 (a.e.t.)	Wigan Athletic
Henry 65'; Van Persie 108'		Roberts 119'

Highbury Stadium, London
Attendance: 37,086
Referee: Phil Dowd (Staffordshire)

Score level at 2-2 on aggregate. Wigan win on away goals rule.

25 January 2006
20:00

Manchester United	2–1	Blackburn Rovers
Van Nistelrooy 8'; Saha 51'		S. Reid 32'

Old Trafford, Manchester
Attendance: 61,637
Referee: Graham Poll

Manchester United win 3–2 on aggregate

== Final ==
The 2006 League Cup final was played on 26 February 2006 and was contested between Premier League teams Wigan Athletic and Manchester United at the Millennium Stadium, Cardiff. The favourites Manchester United won the game comfortably 4–0 in normal time.

26 February 2006
15:00

Manchester United	4–0	Wigan Athletic
Rooney 33', 61'; Saha 55'; Ronaldo 59'	(Report)

Millennium Stadium, Cardiff
Attendance: 66,866
Referee: Alan Wiley (Staffordshire)
- Match details on Soccerbase
