= Nathan Woolfe =

English footballer

Personal information
- Full name: Nathan Brett Woolfe
- Date of birth: 6 October 1988 (age 38)
- Place of birth: Manchester, England
- Height: 5 ft 11 in (1.80 m)
- Position: Striker

Team information
- Current team: Airbus UK Broughton

Youth career
- Manchester City
- ?–2007: Bolton Wanderers

Senior career*
Years	Team	Apps	(Gls)
2007–2009	Bolton Wanderers	0	(0)
2008–2009	→ Wrexham (loan)	9	(1)
2009–2011	Jerez Industrial CF	10	(2)
2011–2012	Northwich Victoria	?	(?)
2012–2014	Hednesford Town	42	(11)
2014–2016	Stockport County	20	(0)
2016–2020	Connah's Quay Nomads	69	(9)
2019	→ Airbus UK Broughton (loan)		
2020–	Airbus UK Broughton		
- * Club domestic league appearances and goals as of 00:07, 17 May 2019 (UTC)

Nathan Brett Woolfe (born 6 October 1988) is an English footballer who plays as a forward for Cymru North club Airbus UK Broughton.

== Career ==
=== Bolton Wanderers ===
Born in Manchester, Greater Manchester, Woolfe started his career at Bolton Wanderers, where he played up-front as a striker. He made his Bolton debut on 13 March 2008, at the Estádio José Alvalade against Sporting CP in the second leg match of the last 16 of the 2007–08 UEFA Cup, replacing Heiðar Helguson for the final 14 minutes of a 1–0 loss (2–1 aggregate).

On 13 November 2008, he joined Conference National club Wrexham on an initial one-month loan deal. Two days later, he was given his debut by Dean Saunders away to Weymouth, scoring a 20-yard free kick to open a 3–1 win. Woolfe was released by Bolton in June 2009, along with Blerim Džemaili, Robert Sissons and James Sinclair.

=== Jerez Industrial / Non-league ===
A month after his Bolton release, he had a trial with Rochdale and took part in a number of their friendlies in the buildup to the new season. In October, he joined the Glenn Hoddle Academy in Spain after being granted a scholarship. He went on loan to Jerez Industrial CF in Segunda División B and played nine games, scoring two goals. In August 2010, he went on trial to UD Almería B in the same league.

In March 2011 he joined Northwich Victoria. He played a key role for the Vics as they finished 2nd in the league and reached the quarter-finals of the FA Trophy. However, due to financial problems Vics were relegated. It was announced that Woolfe had joined Hednesford Town on 18 July 2012. In his first season they were promoted and he scored 11 goals. In May 2014 he agreed to join Stockport County, also of the Conference North.

=== Wales ===
Woolfe went on to sign for Connah's Quay Nomads of the Welsh Premier League in January 2016. On 29 June 2017, he scored the only goal of a shock home win over HJK Helsinki in the Europa League first qualifying round first leg, though the Deesiders lost 3–1 on aggregate. He was part of their side that won the Welsh Cup in 2017–18; as a substitute on 7 April, he scored the last goal of a 6–1 win over Bangor City in the semi-finals.

On 31 January 2019, Woolfe was loaned out to neighbours Airbus UK Broughton of the Cymru Alliance until the end of the season. Just over a year later, he returned to the Wingmakers, now in the Cymru Premier, on a permanent basis.

== Personal life ==
His older half-brother is Steven Woolfe, a lawyer who was Member of the European Parliament for the UK Independence Party representing North West England from 2014 to 2019.
