= 2008–09 Stoke City F.C. season =

Stoke City
2008–09 season
- Chairman: Peter Coates
- Manager: Tony Pulis
- Stadium: Britannia Stadium
- Premier League: 12th (45 points)
- FA Cup: Third round
- League Cup: Quarter-final
- Top goalscorer: League: Ricardo Fuller (11); All: Ricardo Fuller (11)
- Highest home attendance: 27,500 (capacity, 9 times)
- Lowest home attendance: 25,287 vs Fulham (13 December 2008)
- Average home league attendance: 26,954
Home colours	Away colours

The 2008–09 season was Stoke City's first season in the Premier League and the 53rd in the top tier of English football. This was also their 102nd season of league football.

After gaining promotion to the top division for the first time since 1985, Stoke were immediately tipped to be relegated from the Premier League by the media. Dave Kitson became the first signing and he was followed by Seyi Olofinjana, Thomas Sørensen, Amdy Faye, Abdoulaye Faye and the returning Danny Higginbotham. Stoke started the campaign at Bolton Wanderers and were dealt a harsh reality check losing 3–1. Stoke's first home game in the Premier League produced an exciting 3–2 win over Aston Villa with Mamady Sidibé getting the winner in the 93rd minute. Stoke claimed a valuable point away at title challengers Liverpool in September and earned wins over Arsenal, Tottenham Hotspur, Sunderland and West Bromwich Albion in October and November with Rory Delap's long throw-ins causing defences problems.

Stoke hit poor form in December failing to win a match and had to deal with an embarrassing on-field clash between teammates Ricardo Fuller and captain Andy Griffin away at West Ham United. In January Stoke brought in James Beattie and Matthew Etherington who proved to be influential signings. Beattie scored the only goal as Stoke ended a run of nine matches without a win at the end of January against Man City. Stoke continued to improve and pulled clear of the relegation zone with important victories over Bolton, Middlesbrough and West Brom. Stoke sealed survival with a 2–1 victory away at Hull City in May 2009 and ended their first season in the Premier League in 12th position with 45 points.

== Pre-season ==
Stoke began its preparations for the 2008–09 season with the traditional opener at Newcastle Town. City won 3–0 with goals coming from Richard Cresswell, Jon Parkin and Adam Rooney. Stoke then travelled to Austria for their pre-season training camp, where they also played two games. The first was against German side Nürnberg in Stainach, Greek forward Angelos Charisteas scored the only goal of the match. The second was against the Bahrain national team, a rare club versus country match. Stoke won 2–1 with the goals coming from Cresswell and Pericard while Ismail Abdul-Latif replied for the Arabic nation. On their return to England Stoke travelled to League Two Notts County and came away with a 2–0 win thanks to a brace from Mamady Sidibé. Stoke kept their winning run going as they visited Shrewsbury Town's new stadium the New Meadow for the first time, Cresswell scored the winning goal after 68 minutes. Stoke's final away fixture saw them make the long trip down to Southampton. Stoke took the lead through new signing Dave Kitson, David McGoldrick levelled before Pericard scored from distance. Stern John pulled The Saints level again but Stoke were not to be denied as Jamie Hatch scored an own goal. Stoke's final friendly saw them take on Spanish side Osasuna in what was an entertaining 2–2 draw. Delap and Shawcross scored for Stoke while Walter Pandiani and Javad Nekounam scored for Osasuna.

Match	Date	Opponent	Venue	Result	Attendance	Scorers	Report
1	18 July 2008	Newcastle Town	A	3–0	3,011	Cresswell 16', Parkin 32', Rooney 66'	Report
2	22 July 2008	1. FC Nürnberg	A	0–1			Report
3	25 July 2008	Bahrain	N	2–1		Cresswell 29', Péricard 75'	Report
4	29 July 2008	Notts County	A	2–0	2,425	Sidibé (2) 15', 21'	Report
5	2 August 2008	Shrewsbury Town	A	1–0	2,450	Cresswell 68'	Report
6	5 August 2008	Southampton	A	3–2	5,040	Kitson 2', Péricard 74', Hatch (o.g.) 80'	Report
7	8 August 2008	Osasuna	H	2–2	5,419	Shawcross 27', Delap 45'	Report

== Premier League ==
=== August ===
Stoke began their long-awaited first match in the Premier League and first in the top-flight for 23 years away at Gary Megson's Bolton Wanderers. Manager Tony Pulis gave debuts to new signings Thomas Sørensen, Seyi Olofinjana and record £5 million man Dave Kitson. Stoke made a bright start and went close to opening the scoring through Leon Cort and Kitson. However, out of nowhere Bolton took the lead through Grétar Steinsson as his attempted cross curled into the Stoke net. This knocked all the momentum out of Stoke and Bolton took full advantage and scored twice through Kevin Davies and Johan Elmander to put Wanderers 3–0 up at half-time. Stoke tried to get back into the game and did manage to score a consolation from Ricardo Fuller in the final few seconds of the match.

Stoke's first home match in the Premier League came against Aston Villa in front of 27,500 at the Brit as Senegalese duo Abdoulaye Faye and Amdy Faye made their debuts. Both sides made a positive start and Stoke took the lead in the 30th minute when Liam Lawrence scored from the spot after Martin Laursen had brought down Rory Delap. Villa pulled level in the second half through John Carew before Fuller put Stoke back in front with a quality goal. Gareth Barry's stray pass was intercepted by Delap who passed to Lawrence who fed in Fuller and the Jamaican 'swivelled' past Laursen and scored. The lead didn't last long as Stoke failed to deal with an Ashley Young free kick and Laursen made amends for his earlier error. Stoke were not to be denied victory as, in the final minute, a trademark Delap throw-in was headed in by Mamady Sidibé to give Stoke a 3–2 win.

Stoke next travelled to Middlesbrough for the first time since 1997. The match was an even affair until the 36th minute, when Amdy Faye was sent off for a dangerous two-footed tackle on Mohamed Shawky. From the resulting free kick Afonso Alves put Middlesbrough into the lead against the run of play. Boro had the chance to make sure of the win midway through the second half after Abdoulaye Faye fouled Alves in the area, but Stewart Downing hit the crossbar from the resulting spot kick. Stoke then equalised after Justin Hoyte put a Lawrence cross in to his own net. However Turkish striker Tuncay beat the offside trap and gave Boro the win.

=== September ===
For the visit of Everton, there were debuts for Ibrahima Sonko and the return of Danny Higginbotham. It was also the first live televised match of the season. Stoke made the better start with Fuller testing Tim Howard early on. It was Everton though who opened the scoring when Nigerian striker Yakubu scored just before half-time, and five minutes after the restart it became 2–0 as another Nigerian, Victor Anichebe, headed in. Stoke pulled one back through a Nigerian of their own when Olofinjana volleyed in after the Everton defence failed to clear a Delap throw. City thought they had equalised moments later when Fuller went through and rounded 'keeper Howard but he was penalised for a foul on Joseph Yobo. They were level soon though as Phil Jagielka headed a Delap throw into his own net. Everton thought they should have had a penalty when Cort handled in the area but the referee, Alan Wiley deemed it outside the box which resulted in David Moyes being sent to the stands for his protest. Tim Cahill headed Everton back in front and the Toffees held out for the points.

Stoke completed the Merseyside double with a trip to Anfield. Liverpool went into the match in fine form and it looked to be a very difficult task for Stoke to come away with anything. Stoke made a bad start as Steven Gerrard's free kick found the back of the net, luckily for Stoke the linesman ruled the goal out for offside. Liverpool had numerous chances to take the lead but Stoke's defence held firm and came away with an impressive 0–0 draw.

Title favourites Chelsea next came to the Britannia Stadium and produced a commanding performance with two goals from José Bosingwa and Nicolas Anelka. Stoke rarely troubled Chelsea 'keeper Petr Čech in what was a simple win for the away side.

=== October ===
Steve Simonsen and Michael Tonge made their first starts of the season away at Portsmouth. Peter Crouch acrobatically fired Pompey into the lead from Jermain Defoe's cross after 24 minutes at a time when the Potters were slightly on top of the game. Ricardo Fuller forced home an equaliser just after the break, but Defoe secured all three points for the hosts just three minutes later when he beat Simonsen at his near post with a low drive.

Juande Ramos's Tottenham travelled to Stoke in what turned out to be a match full of incident. The first came after 17 minutes when Gareth Bale fouled Tom Soares in the area and received a red card. Higginbotham scored from the spot after having to reset the ball four times due to strong winds. Spurs then equalised through Darren Bent before Delap gave City the lead early in the second half. Sørensen was then forced off due to injury and also Spurs defender, Vedran Ćorluka who collided with his own keeper Heurelho Gomes. Due to these injuries 11 minutes of stoppage time were added, Stoke had the chance to end the match when Soares was again brought down in the box but Fuller's spot kick hit both posts and Delap's rebound hit the cross bar. Spurs were reduced to nine men when Michael Dawson lunged nastily at Sidibé.

Stoke made their first trip to the City of Manchester Stadium and were undone by £32 million Brazilian Robinho, who scored a hat-trick. City did have their chances, but were unable to beat Joe Hart.

The first Tuesday night match in the Premier League came at home against Roy Keane's Sunderland, who had beaten rivals Newcastle United at the weekend. It proved to be a very tight affair with both sides struggling to create clear-cut chances. Stoke scored the only goal of the game when Fuller out-jumped Dean Whitehead to head in another Delap throw-in.

=== November ===
Arsenal visited the Britannia Stadium at the beginning of November and it was another match full of incident. The first came after just eleven minutes when Fuller's delicate touch from a Delap long throw put City in the lead. Arsenal rarely threatened Sørensen as they struggled to deal with Stoke's greater power and strength. They conceded again from a Delap throw on 73 minutes when Olofinjana bundled the ball past Almunia. Arsenal's misery was complete when Van Persie was sent off for needlessly barging into Sørensen, leaving him requiring assistance from the physio. Gaël Clichy's deflected free kick gave the Gunners a consolation deep in stoppage time. After the match, Arsenal manager Arsène Wenger accused Stoke of being overly aggressive in their play. Pulis responded to Wenger's criticism by quoting Abraham Lincoln.

Stoke went to Wigan still looking for their first away win in the Premier League however, the home side were full of confidence and had Egyptian striker Amr Zaki in fine form. The Latics dominated the match and had 22 shots to City's 2. The combination of saves from Sørensen and some wayward Wigan shooting meant Stoke managed a useful scoreless draw.

Stoke then made the short trip to Manchester United in what turned out to be a poor game for City, as the reigning champions scored five times without reply. Goals from Michael Carrick, Dimitar Berbatov, Danny Welbeck and two free-kicks from Cristiano Ronaldo condemned Stoke to a heavy defeat.

After the heavy defeat at Old Trafford, Stoke came up against Midlands rivals West Bromwich Albion. It was a poor match with few scoring opportunities, but Stoke did manage to get the only goal of the game when Mamady Sidibé converted Danny Higginbotham's inch-perfect centre with just five minutes remaining, to maintain City's exceptional winning record against the Baggies, and also lifted Stoke up to 13th place in the Premier League.

Surprise package Hull City arrived at the Britannia Stadium, which was covered by fog. Stoke dominated most of the match and should have scored in the first half, however it was the away side who opened the scoring through Marlon King just before half-time. Boaz Myhill made a number of impressive saves to keep Hull ahead but he gave away a penalty when he fouled Fuller in the area and the Jamaican made the scores level. City pressed for the winner but the Tigers held out for a 1–1 draw. One bizarre moment of the match came when Hull substitute Dean Windass was shown a yellow card by referee Keith Stroud without coming on to the pitch, after he began to warm up too close to Delap who was preparing to take a throw-in.

=== December ===
Michael Owen scored twice for Newcastle United in the first 25 minutes of City's next match at St James' Park. Stoke improved greatly in the second half and when Ricardo Fuller was brought off the bench the game started to change, and moments later he set up Sidibé for a simple tap-in. Stoke had a number of chances to pull level and the equaliser came in stoppage time when former Newcastle player Abdoulaye Faye converted a Whelan free kick to earn Stoke a 2–2 draw.

Stoke drew for the third game in a row when Fulham made the trip to the Britannia, it was a poor game of football with Richard Cresswell coming the closest to opening the scoring. Sidibé suffered a serious injury after just a few minutes of the match which ruled him out until the end of February. There was an unsavoury moment in the match when Fulham defender John Paintsil theatrically threw himself to the ground after minimal contact from Ricardo Fuller. Fuller branded Paintsil's actions as "disgraceful".

Over 5,000 Stoke fans travelled to Blackburn Rovers as the club put on free coach travel. Pulis named an unusual starting eleven which included back-up 'keeper Steve Simonsen, Ryan Shawcross at right-back and reserve striker Vincent Péricard starting. Rovers had new manager Sam Allardyce making his home debut and his team took control of the match early on. Sonko clumsily brought down Pedersen and Benni McCarthy made no mistake from the spot. Jason Roberts added a second before McCarthy made it 3–0 before half time. Only Steve Simonsen prevented Rovers adding more in the second half.

On Boxing Day Stoke took on Manchester United in what was a bad-tempered affair. Carlos Tevez scored the only goal for the away side in the second half, after Andy Wilkinson had been sent off for two bookable offences.

Stoke made the trip to London for their match against West Ham, still looking for their first away win. City made the best possible start when Abdoulaye Faye powerfully headed in after just four minutes. It became a tight game for the remainder of the first half and City went in at the break a goal up. However, Carlton Cole equalised for the Hammers after some poor defending from Andy Griffin. Following West Ham's goal, Fuller argued with Griffin, before slapping the Stoke captain's face. Mike Jones gave Fuller a straight red for violent conduct and West Ham went on to win the match 2–1, Diego Tristán earning the Hammers the three points. On 1 January 2009, Tony Pulis confirmed that Fuller and Griffin had "kissed and made up" after a team meeting. Fuller said Griffin had been "very rude and disrespectful", but accepted that his actions had been worse.

=== January ===
After their embarrassing exit to Hartlepool United in the FA Cup, Stoke took on title challengers Liverpool at the Britannia Stadium. Pulis gave new signing Matthew Etherington his debut as Stoke made a bright start to the match. Firstly, Delap hit the crossbar from seven yards, and then Shawcross put the ball past Pepe Reina, but the goal was ruled out for offside. Liverpool rarely threatened until the final few minutes when Gerrard hit the woodwork twice, and the match finished in a 0–0 draw.

James Beattie made his Stoke debut against Chelsea following his transfer from Sheffield United. Stoke suffered a blow early into the match as both Amdy Faye and Danny Higginbotham had to depart due to injury. Stoke took a surprise lead in the 60th minute when Delap broke free and beat Petr Čech. Stoke thought they had done enough to claim victory, but in the 88th minute Chelsea equalised through Juliano Belletti, then Frank Lampard scored with the final kick of the game to give Stoke a bitter defeat.

Stoke went into the game at Tottenham looking for their first win since the beginning of December. However, any hopes of getting a result were ended in the first half, as Spurs took control ruthlessly and went in at half time 3–0 in the lead. Stoke did manage to gain a consolation in the second half when Beattie scored his first goal for the club.

Manchester City made the trip to the Britannia at the end of January and made a bright start, with Robinho and Stephen Ireland going close to opening the scoring. Delap was sent off in the 38th minute when he kicked the ball at Shaun Wright-Phillips after the Man City player fouled Etherington. Stoke took the lead against the run of play in the 45th minute when Beattie out-jumped Wayne Bridge and headed past Joe Hart. Man City controlled the second half but never managed to score the equaliser, and Stoke gained a valuable three points.

=== February ===
Stoke were boosted by two transfer deadline day captures with the loans of Birmingham's Stephen Kelly and Wigan's Henri Camara. Stoke suffered a major blow after just 30 minutes in the match in Wearside when Pulis had to make three substitutions, all due to injury. Sunderland took the lead in the second half through a Kenwyne Jones header. Camara then managed to hit the crossbar from just four yards. Etherington was sent off for needlessly tripping Danny Collins, and David Healy gave Sunderland a 2–0 win.

The match against Portsmouth came alive in the final 15 minutes. Niko Kranjčar gave Pompey the lead and from the restart Stoke were awarded a penalty after Glen Johnson handled in the area. Beattie scored to bring Stoke back level. He scored again just two minutes later after he headed in a Danny Pugh cross. With Stoke set for an important three points, Shawcross, under pressure from Hermann Hreiðarsson sliced the ball into his own net to give Pompey a point.

=== March ===
Abdoulaye Faye was ruled out of the match against Aston Villa, meaning that an unfamiliar back pairing of Sonko and Higginbotham started. In the first half, Villa dominated and it became only a matter of time before they scored; it came on the stroke of half-time through Bulgarian Stiliyan Petrov. Sørensen injured himself trying to save Petrov's goal and was replaced at half-time by Simonsen. Stoke improved in second half but couldn't score the equaliser, and the game looked finished after 80 minutes as John Carew fired Villa into a 2–0 lead. Stoke continued to push forward though and went close through Shawcross and Whelan who hit the post, Stoke did pull one back in the 88th minute when Shawcross headed in a cross from Beattie. Stoke managed to score again in the final minute as Glenn Whelan's volley beat Brad Friedel to claim an unlikely 2–2 draw.

Bolton were Stoke's next opponents and should have taken the lead through Johan Elmander after 11 minutes. City responded in clinical fashion and took the lead with their first chance of the game just three minutes later, through James Beattie. Both sides continued to create and miss chances as the game became an entertaining affair. Stoke sealed the win when Fuller took advantage of Wanderers failing to clear a Delap throw-in.

Stoke made the trip to Goodison Park for the first time since 1985, still looking for their first away win in the Premier League. The Toffees took control early on and goals from Brazilian Jô and Joleon Lescott gave the home side a 2–0 half-time lead. Stoke responded in the second half through a Shawcross header and came close to getting an equaliser, but Marouane Fellaini made the points safe for Everton in added time.

Stoke then faced Middlesbrough in a relegation clash at the Britannia Stadium. It was a scrappy encounter and, with the game seemingly destined for a draw, Stoke scored through Shawcross via a Delap throw to give Stoke a vital three points and leave Boro rooted in the bottom three.

=== April ===
Stoke made the short trip to West Brom and made a flying start with Fuller scoring after just 80 seconds. Stoke went on to dominate the hosts, and only Scott Carson kept the Baggies in the match. Stoke sealed their first Premier League away win and their first away win in the top flight since May 1984 after Beattie curled his shot past Carson to seal a 2–0 victory.

Relegation-threatened Newcastle United, along with their new manager Alan Shearer, were the next side to come to the Britannia Stadium. Newcastle struggled throughout, and Stoke took the lead after 33 minutes when former Newcastle player Abdoulaye Faye powerfully headed in a Liam Lawrence corner. Stoke had a number of chances to score the second but were unable to find the net, and Newcastle claimed a fortunate point with ten minutes remaining through Andy Carroll.

Stoke then faced another relegation threatened side, Blackburn Rovers. The only goal came after 75 minutes when Liam Lawrence drilled the ball past Paul Robinson to send the Potters eight points above the relegation zone.

Stoke made the trip to the capital to face in form Fulham; the home side took control of the match early on and took the lead in the 29th minute through Erik Nevland. Stoke were much improved in the second half and had a number of chances to level, but the match finished 1–0 to Europe-bound Fulham.

=== May ===
West Ham were next to arrive at Stoke and became the first team to win at the Britannia Stadium in 2009. The match was a very tight affair, with on the only goal being scored by a Diego Tristan free-kick after 33 minutes.

A win away at Hull City would confirm survival for Stoke with two games remaining, and with Phil Brown's side also looking for vital points in order to climb out of the relegation zone. It turned out to be a very entertaining match, with both sides going all out for the win. Stoke took the lead after Lawrence put in a dangerous ball which fell through to Fuller, and he pounced from 6 yards to slam the ball into the bottom corner of Boaz Myhill's goal. Hull came out strong in the second half and brought on forwards Geovanni, Manucho, and Bernard Mendy in an attempt to draw level. Stoke sealed their survival with a long-range goal from Liam Lawrence on 73 minutes. Hull scored a late consolation via a Andy Dawson free kick in the final minute.

The season's penultimate game was against Wigan Athletic at home. The match was played in a relaxed atmosphere and was an entertaining game, Stoke winning 2–0 thanks to a trademark solo goal from Fuller and a well-worked goal from James Beattie.

The final game of the 2008–09 season came at Arsenal with Stoke making their first trip to the Emirates Stadium. Stoke lost 4–1 with all the goals coming in the first half. An own goal from Beattie opened the scoring for Arsenal with further goals from Abou Diaby and a brace from Robin van Persie. Stoke's goal came from a Fuller penalty after he was brought down in the area by a cynical foul by Denilson.

=== Results ===
Match	Date	Opponent	Venue	Result	Attendance	Scorers	Report
1	16 August 2008	Bolton Wanderers	A	1–3	22,717	Fuller 90'	Report
2	23 August 2008	Aston Villa	H	3–2	27,500	Lawrence 30' (pen), Fuller 80', Sidibé 90'	Report
3	30 August 2008	Middlesbrough	A	1–2	27,627	Hoyte 71' (o.g.)	Report
4	14 September 2008	Everton	H	2–3	27,415	Olofinjana 55', Jagielka 63' (o.g.)	Report
5	20 September 2008	Liverpool	A	0–0	43,931		Report
6	27 September 2008	Chelsea	H	0–2	27,500		Report
7	5 October 2008	Portsmouth	A	1–2	19,248	Fuller 48'	Report
8	19 October 2008	Tottenham Hotspur	H	2–1	27,500	Higginbotham 19' (pen), Delap 53'	Report
9	26 October 2008	Manchester City	A	0–3	44,624		Report
10	29 October 2008	Sunderland	H	1–0	26,731	Fuller 73'	Report
11	1 November 2008	Arsenal	H	2–1	26,704	Fuller 11', Olofinjana 73'	Report
12	8 November 2008	Wigan Athletic	A	0–0	15,881		Report
13	15 November 2008	Manchester United	A	0–5	75,369		Report
14	22 November 2008	West Bromwich Albion	H	1–0	26,613	Sidibé 84'	Report
15	29 November 2008	Hull City	H	1–1	27,500	Fuller 73' (pen)	Report
16	6 December 2008	Newcastle United	A	2–2	47,422	Sidibé 60', Faye 90'	Report
17	13 December 2008	Fulham	H	0–0	25,287		Report
18	20 December 2008	Blackburn Rovers	A	0–3	23,004		Report
19	26 December 2008	Manchester United	H	0–1	27,500		Report
20	28 December 2008	West Ham United	A	1–2	34,477	Faye 4'	Report
21	10 January 2009	Liverpool	H	0–0	27,500		Report
22	17 January 2009	Chelsea	A	1–2	41,778	Delap 60'	Report
23	27 January 2009	Tottenham Hotspur	A	1–3	36,072	Beattie 57'	Report
24	31 January 2009	Manchester City	H	1–0	27,236	Beattie 45'	Report
25	7 February 2009	Sunderland	A	0–2	38,350		Report
26	21 February 2009	Portsmouth	H	2–2	26,354	Beattie (2) 78' (pen), 80'	Report
27	1 March 2009	Aston Villa	A	2–2	39,641	Shawcross 88', Whelan 90'	Report
28	4 March 2009	Bolton Wanderers	H	2–0	26,319	Beattie 14', Fuller 73'	Report
29	14 March 2009	Everton	A	1–3	36,396	Shawcross 52'	Report
30	21 March 2009	Middlesbrough	H	1–0	26,442	Shawcross 84'	Report
31	4 April 2009	West Bromwich Albion	A	2–0	26,277	Fuller 2', Beattie 49'	Report
32	11 April 2009	Newcastle United	H	1–1	27,382	Faye 33'	Report
33	18 April 2009	Blackburn Rovers	H	1–0	27,500	Lawrence 75'	Report
34	25 April 2009	Fulham	A	0–1	24,997		Report
35	2 May 2009	West Ham United	H	0–1	27,500		Report
36	9 May 2009	Hull City	A	2–1	24,932	Fuller 41', Lawrence 73'	Report
37	16 May 2009	Wigan Athletic	H	2–0	25,641	Fuller 69', Beattie 76'	Report
38	24 May 2009	Arsenal	A	1–4	60,082	Fuller 31' (pen)	Report

=== Final league table ===
Pos	Team	Pld	W	D	L	GF	GA	GD	Pts
10	Manchester City	38	15	5	18	58	50	+8	50
11	Wigan Athletic	38	12	9	17	34	45	−11	45
12	Stoke City	38	12	9	17	38	55	−17	45
13	Bolton Wanderers	38	11	8	19	41	53	−12	41
14	Portsmouth	38	10	11	17	38	57	−19	41

Source: Barclays Premier League
Rules for classification: 1) points; 2) goal difference; 3) number of goals scored.

== FA Cup ==
Stoke were drawn against League One Hartlepool United in the third round of the FA Cup. Manager Pulis decided to field a largely reserve side with the likes of Andy Davies, Ibrahima Sonko, Tom Soares, Michael Tonge all getting rare run-outs. However, that decision backfired as Stoke were awful and Hartlepool claimed a shock 2–0 victory with goals from Michael Nelson and a wonder goal from David Foley.

Round	Date	Opponent	Venue	Result	Attendance	Scorers	Report
R3	3 January 2009	Hartlepool United	A	0–2	5,367		Report

== League Cup ==
Stoke manager Tony Pulis made a large number of changes for the game at Cheltenham to give the Stoke side a largely reserve look. It turned out to be an entertaining game as Stoke opened the scoring at the beginning of the second half through a Glenn Whelan free kick. It was 2–0 three minutes later when Richard Cresswell outpaced the Cheltenham defence and rounded Robins keeper Shane Higgs. Ashley Vincent gave Cheltenham hope before Jon Parkin sealed the win for Stoke. Alex Russell scored a consolation for the home side deep into added time.

Stoke took on Championship side Reading in the third round of the League Cup and took the lead through Pericard after nine minutes. James Henry pulled the Royals level from the spot before Sidibé put Stoke back in front. However, Henry scored again to send the tie into extra time. There were no more goals, meaning a penalty shootout would be required. Royals forward Leroy Lita missed the decisive spot kick and Stoke went through.

Rotherham United made it through to face City in the fourth round and posed an early threat to a largely reserve Stoke side in what was a bright opening 10 minutes by the League Two side. However, City took control of the game and took the lead after 21 minutes through another Whelan free kick which left Andy Warrington with no chance of saving. Stoke sealed their place in the quarter final of the League Cup for the first time since 1978 when Danny Pugh scored his first goal for the club.

Stoke faced Derby in the quarters and it proved to be a very frustrating night for the home side as, with just ten seconds remaining Rob Styles adjudged former Ram Andy Griffin to have handled the ball inside the penalty area in the 93rd minute, and Nathan Ellington stepped up to send Derby through.

Round	Date	Opponent	Venue	Result	Attendance	Scorers	Report
R2	26 August 2008	Cheltenham Town	A	3–2	3,600	Whelan 51', Cresswell 54', Parkin 78'	Report
R3	23 September 2008	Reading	H	2–2 (4–3 pens)	9,141	Péricard 9', Sidibé 50'	Report
R4	11 November 2008	Rotherham United	H	2–0	15,458	Whelan 21', Pugh 59'	Report
Quarter Final	2 December 2008	Derby County	H	0–1	22,034		Report

== Squad statistics ==
No.	Pos.	Name	League		FA Cup		League Cup		Total		Discipline	
No.	Pos.	Name	Apps	Goals	Apps	Goals	Apps	Goals	Apps	Goals	Yellow card	Red card
1	GK	(England) Steve Simonsen	3(2)	0	1	0	4	0	8(2)	0	1	0
2	DF	(England) Andy Griffin (c)	17(3)	0	0	0	1	0	18(3)	0	4	0
3	DF	(England) Danny Higginbotham	28	1	0	0	2	0	30	1	1	0
4	MF	(Nigeria) Seyi Olofinjana	14(4)	2	1	0	2	0	17(4)	2	2	0
5	DF	(England) Leon Cort	9(2)	0	0	0	2(1)	0	11(3)	0	0	0
6	MF	(Republic of Ireland) Glenn Whelan	21(5)	1	1	0	4	2	26(5)	3	3	0
7	MF	(Republic of Ireland) Liam Lawrence	18(2)	3	0(1)	0	1	0	19(3)	3	8	0
8	FW	(England) Jon Parkin	0	0	0	0	1	1	1	1	0	0
8	MF	(England) Tom Soares	5(2)	0	1	0	0	0	6(2)	0	0	0
9	FW	(England) Richard Cresswell	11(19)	0	0	0	4	1	15(19)	1	3	0
10	FW	(Jamaica) Ricardo Fuller	25(9)	11	0	0	1(2)	0	26(11)	11	9	1
11	FW	(Mali) Mamady Sidibé	17(5)	3	0	0	2	1	19(5)	4	1	0
12	FW	(England) Dave Kitson	10(6)	0	0(1)	0	1	0	11(7)	0	2	0
14	MF	(England) Danny Pugh	9(8)	0	0	0	2(1)	1	11(9)	1	1	0
15	FW	(France) Vincent Péricard	1(3)	0	1	0	3	1	5(3)	1	1	0
16	DF	(Scotland) Dominic Matteo	0	0	0	0	0(1)	0	0(1)	0	0	0
17	DF	(England) Ryan Shawcross	28(1)	3	1	0	3	0	32(1)	3	4	0
18	MF	(Senegal) Salif Diao	18(2)	0	0	0	1	0	19(2)	0	3	0
19	MF	(Senegal) Amdy Faye	18(3)	0	0	0	0(1)	0	18(4)	0	3	1
20	FW	(England) James Beattie	16	7	0	0	0	0	16	7	1	0
21	DF	(England) Andrew Davies	0(2)	0	1	0	0	0	1(2)	0	0	0
22	DF	(England) Lewis Buxton	0	0	0	0	2	0	2	0	0	0
22	DF	(Republic of Ireland) Stephen Kelly	2(4)	0	0	0	0	0	2(4)	0	0	0
23	MF	(England) Michael Tonge	1(9)	0	1	0	0	0	2(9)	0	1	0
24	MF	(Republic of Ireland) Rory Delap	34	2	1	0	1	0	36	2	2	1
25	DF	(Senegal) Abdoulaye Faye	36	3	0	0	0	0	36	3	4	0
26	MF	(England) Matthew Etherington	12(2)	0	0	0	0	0	12(2)	0	3	1
27	MF	(Jamaica) Demar Phillips	0	0	0	0	0(2)	0	0(2)	0	0	0
27	FW	(Senegal) Henri Camara	0(4)	0	0	0	0	0	0(4)	0	0	0
28	DF	(England) Andy Wilkinson	20(2)	0	0(1)	0	3	0	23(3)	0	5	1
29	GK	(Denmark) Thomas Sørensen	35(1)	0	0	0	0	0	35(1)	0	0	0
30	DF	(England) Ryan Shotton	0	0	0	0	0(1)	0	0(1)	0	0	0
31	DF	(England) Carl Dickinson	3(2)	0	1	0	3	0	7(2)	0	0	0
33	DF	(Senegal) Ibrahima Sonko	7(7)	0	1	0	1	0	9(7)	0	0	0
35	FW	(England) Marc Grocott	0	0	0	0	0	0	0	0	0	0
36	MF	(England) Jimmy Phillips	0	0	0	0	0	0	0	0	0	0
37	MF	(England) Tom Thorley	0	0	0	0	0	0	0	0	0	0
38	GK	(England) Danzelle St Louis-Hamilton	0	0	0	0	0	0	0	0	0	0
39	MF	(England) Nathaniel Wedderburn	0	0	0	0	0	0	0	0	0	0
–	–	Own goals	–	2	–	0	–	0	–	2	–	–

== Transfers ==
=== In ===
Date	Pos.	Name	From	Fee	Ref.
18 July 2008	FW	(England) Dave Kitson	(England) Reading	£5.5 Million	
26 July 2008	MF	(Nigeria) Seyi Olofinjana	(England) Wolverhampton Wanderers	£3 Million	
30 July 2008	GK	(Denmark) Thomas Sørensen	(England) Aston Villa	Free	
15 August 2008	DF	(Senegal) Abdoulaye Faye	(England) Newcastle United	£2.25 Million	
15 August 2008	MF	(Senegal) Amdy Faye	(England) Charlton Athletic	Undisclosed	
19 August 2008	DF	(England) Andrew Davies	(England) Southampton	£1.3 Million	
29 August 2008	DF	(Senegal) Ibrahima Sonko	(England) Reading	£2 Million	
1 September 2008	DF	(England) Danny Higginbotham	(England) Sunderland	£2 Million	
1 September 2008	MF	(England) Tom Soares	(England) Crystal Palace	£1.25 Million	
1 September 2008	MF	(England) Michael Tonge	(England) Sheffield United	£2 Million	
8 January 2009	MF	(England) Matthew Etherington	(England) West Ham United	£2 Million	
12 January 2009	FW	(England) James Beattie	(England) Sheffield United	£3.5 Million	

=== Out ===
Date	Pos.	Name	To	Fee	Ref.
5 June 2008	DF	(England) Marlon Broomes	(England) Blackpool	Released	
15 August 2008	FW	(Republic of Ireland) Adam Rooney	(Scotland) Inverness Caledonian Thistle	£50,000	
29 August 2008	MF	(Wales) Anthony Pulis	(England) Southampton	Free	
1 September 2008	FW	(England) Jon Parkin	(England) Preston North End	Undisclosed	
8 January 2009	DF	(Belgium) Ritchie De Laet	(England) Manchester United	Undisclosed	
26 January 2009	DF	(England) Lewis Buxton	(England) Sheffield Wednesday	Nominal Fee	
3 February 2009	MF	(Jamaica) Demar Phillips	(Norway) Aalesunds FK	Free	

=== Loan in ===
Date from	Date to	Pos.	Name	From	Ref.
2 February 2009	30 June 2009	FW	(Senegal) Henri Camara	(England) Wigan Athletic	
4 February 2009	30 June 2009	DF	(Republic of Ireland) Stephen Kelly	(England) Birmingham City	

=== Loan out ===
Date from	Date to	Pos.	Name	To	Ref.
29 August 2008	31 August 2008	FW	(England) Jon Parkin	(England) Preston North End	
29 August 2008	30 June 2009	DF	(England) Ryan Shotton	(England) Tranmere Rovers	
17 October 2008	25 January 2009	DF	(England) Lewis Buxton	(England) Sheffield Wednesday	
27 November 2008	25 January 2009	MF	(England) Nathaniel Wedderburn	(England) Notts County	
15 January 2009	15 February 2009	DF	(England) Carl Dickinson	(England) Leeds United	
15 January 2009	30 June 2009	MF	(England) Tom Soares	(England) Charlton Athletic	
13 February 2009	13 March 2009	DF	(England) Andrew Davies	(England) Preston North End	
17 February 2009	17 March 2009	GK	(England) Danzelle St. Louis-Hamilton	(England) Bristol Rovers	
20 February 2009	30 June 2009	FW	(France) Vincent Péricard	(England) Millwall	
10 March 2009	30 June 2009	FW	(England) Dave Kitson	(England) Reading	
