= Charles Wiley =

Charles Wiley may refer to:

- Charles Wiley (publisher) (1782–1826), American publisher
- Charles Wiley (priest) (1839–1915), Irish Anglican priest
- Charles Wiley (Canadian football) (born 1998), American footballer in the Canadian Football League

== See also ==
- Charles H. Willey (1889–1977), United States Navy machinist
