= Abdoulaye Faye =

Senegalese footballer (born 1978)

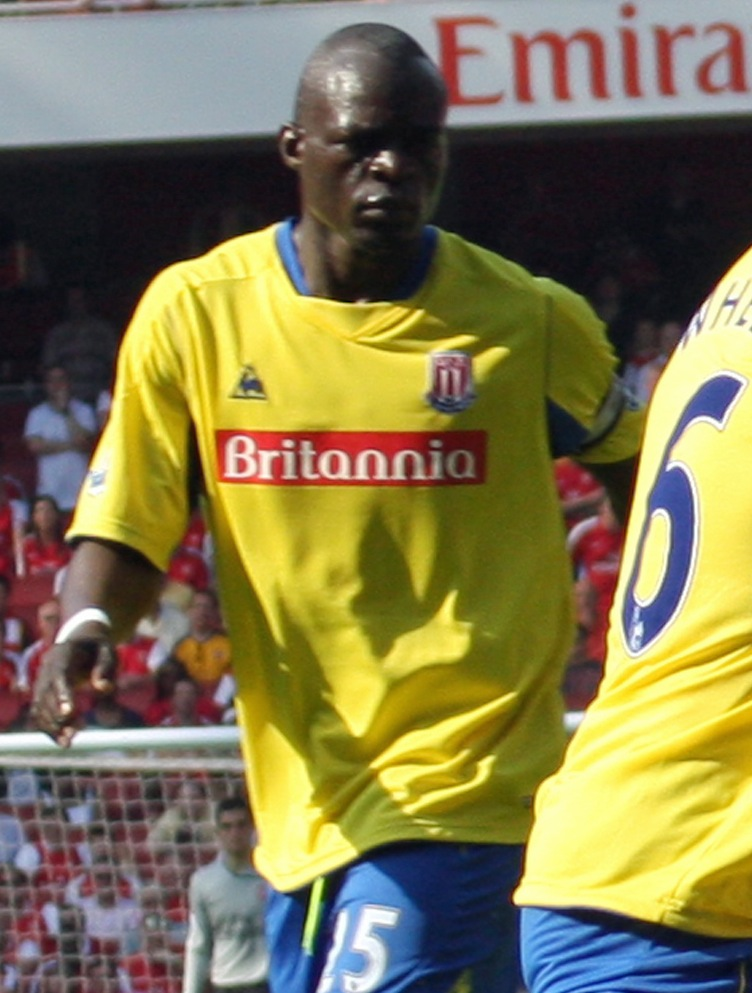
- Faye playing for Stoke City in 2009

Personal information
- Full name: Abdoulaye Diagne-Faye
- Date of birth: 26 February 1978 (age 48)
- Place of birth: Dakar, Senegal
- Height: 1.88 m (6 ft 2 in)
- Position: Defender

Senior career*
Years	Team	Apps	(Gls)
1999–2001	ASEC Ndiambour	59	(8)
2001–2002	Jeanne d'Arc	32	(4)
2002–2005	Lens	35	(0)
2004–2005	→ Istres (loan)	28	(0)
2005–2007	Bolton Wanderers	60	(3)
2007–2008	Newcastle United	22	(1)
2008–2011	Stoke City	81	(6)
2011–2012	West Ham United	29	(0)
2012–2014	Hull City	34	(4)
2014–2015	Sabah FA	21	(1)
Total		401	(27)

International career
2002–2010	Senegal	36	(2)
- * Club domestic league appearances and goals

Abdoulaye Diagne-Faye (born 26 February 1978), known as Abdoulaye Faye, is a Senegalese former footballer who played as a defender.

Faye began his career playing for ASEC Ndiambour and Jeanne d'Arc in his native Senegal before moving to French side Lens in 2002. After spending time out on loan at Istres he attracted the attentions of Sam Allardyce who signed him for Bolton Wanderers in July 2005. After two seasons at Bolton he followed Allardyce to Newcastle United where he spent one season before joining Stoke City in August 2008 for £2.25 million. Faye became a popular player at the Britannia Stadium in 2008–2009 as he won the player of the year and was named captain by Tony Pulis for the 2009–2010 season. He lost the capacity to Ryan Shawcross for 2010–2011 and then had a third spell working with Allardyce at West Ham United. Faye helped the Hammers gain promotion to the Premier League in 2011–12 before joining Hull City where he was again involved in a promotion winning season in 2012–13 before being released at the end of the 2013–14 season.

== Career ==
=== Early career ===
Faye was born in Dakar, Senegal and began his career at ASEC Ndiambour, before leaving the then top-three team to go to Jeanne d'Arc. He then went on to join Lens in July 2002, integrating into a squad which at that time included fellow Senegalese Papa Bouba Diop.

=== Bolton Wanderers ===
Faye signed for English side Bolton Wanderers in July 2005 on loan. Faye made his debut for Bolton against Newcastle United where he enjoyed a memorable debut in a 2–0 home win in which, he aerially out-muscled Alan Shearer. He came on as a substitute for the injured Radhi Jaïdi and never looked back after a dominant display. Wanderers manager Sam Allardyce praised the form of Faye early into his Bolton career. In December 2005 Faye signed a permanent contract with Bolton. Following this Faye expressed his delight at staying in England.

"I like the English better than the French, they are more pleasant and nicer people. I am having a great time. In France you are almost treated too strictly. Here you work hard, you do your job but are given a little bit more freedom to enjoy life."

— Faye on why he prefers England to France.

In the 2006–07 season Faye operated almost exclusively as a central defender following the departures of Bruno Ngotty and Jaïdi to Birmingham City. Over the course of the season he developed a formidable partnership with Ivorian Abdoulaye Méïté, ensuring that Bolton had a strong home defensive record before the new year. Soon after they fell away in the second half of the season only just qualifying for the UEFA Cup with sides finding a way through Faye and Meite's dominance. Faye managed to score two goals against Arsenal in successive seasons helping Bolton to 2–0 and 3–1 victories due to his definite aerial prowess which the Arsenal defenders had no answer to. He was known for his dominant displays at central defence throughout the season and became a favourite among Bolton fans.

=== Newcastle United ===
On 15 August 2007, there were stories in several newspapers stating that Faye would be moving to Newcastle United for around £2m to join up with former Manager Sam Allardyce. On 31 August 2007, Faye signed a three-year contract at Newcastle United. Faye was presented to the Newcastle fans at half-time during the home game against Wigan Athletic on 1 September. On 24 February 2008, Faye scored his only goal for Newcastle United during the 5–1 defeat at home to Manchester United.

=== Stoke City ===
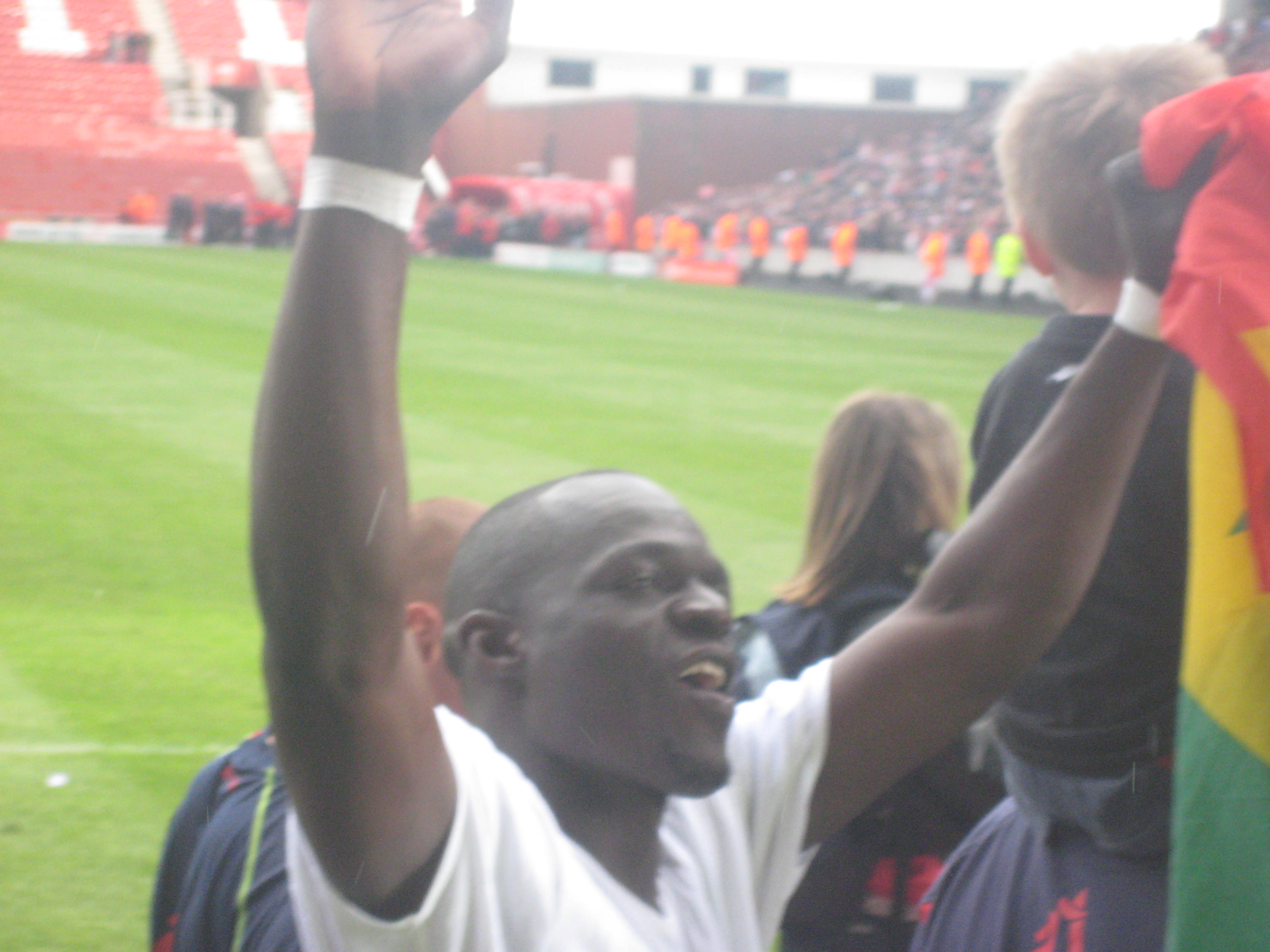
Faye celebrating Stoke's survival in 2009

On 15 August 2008, Faye joined newly promoted Premier League side Stoke City from Newcastle United for £2.25 million on a three-year contract. He made his debut for Stoke in a 3–2 win over Aston Villa in August 2008. He scored his first goal for the club against his old club Newcastle, which came in the 90th minute of the match to earn Stoke a point in a 2–2 draw. He scored against Newcastle again later in the season in another draw between the two sides. Faye's impressive first season did not go unnoticed with fellow Stoke players and fans as he won both Players and Fans Player of the Season Award for Stoke City. He was also voted player of the year by all of the club's supporters groups.

Following his first season at Stoke he was awarded the captain's armband on a permanent basis for the 2009–10 season. Faye had another good season for City but was also hampered by injuries and had to leave the field before 30 minutes on a number of occasions. Manager Tony Pulis gave the captaincy to Ryan Shawcross for the 2010–11 season. He struggled to make much of an impact during the season and was released at the end of it after he was not offered a new contract. Stoke manager Tony Pulis and The Sentinel paid tribute to Faye following his released in May 2011.

"Abdy's contribution to getting the Club where it is today should never be under-estimated, He loved playing for this Football Club and the supporters loved him, so in many respects it is sad to see him move on. But we are moving forward as a Club and unfortunately there are times when you have to make tough decisions that allow you to bring in the new faces which can improve the squad, and this is obviously one of them. We would like to thank Abdy for his contribution over the past three years and wish him well in the future."

— Pulis on Faye's time at Stoke City.

=== West Ham United ===
In June 2011, following his release from Stoke City, Faye signed for Championship side West Ham United on a free transfer linking up with manager Sam Allardyce for a third time and he said: "I am very happy to be here at West Ham – this is a great club, a big club and I cannot wait to get started here," Faye told the club website. Faye made his debut for West Ham on 16 August 2011 in a 4–0 away win against Watford. At the end of the season Faye left West Ham after helping them to gain an instant return to the Premier League.

=== Hull City ===
Faye joined Football League Championship side Hull City on 20 July 2012 on a one-year deal. He made his debut for the club on 11 August 2012 in the League Cup match at the KC Stadium against Rotherham United. On 1 September 2012, against former club Bolton at the KC Stadium, Quinn delivered a high, hanging corner into the middle of Bolton's six-yard box where Faye out-jumped the away defence and goalkeeper Ádám Bogdán to head into the net for his first goal for the club.

On 15 September 2012 against Millwall at the KC Stadium, James Chester and Faye stayed up following a corner and when the ball was worked to Chester on the edge of the Millwall box, he went past Scott Malone down the outside and crossed for Faye to head home past Maik Taylor Two days later, Faye scored his third goal in as many games with a header against Leeds United at Elland Road to make it 2–1 to Hull in a 3–2 win. He played 33 times for Hull in 2012–13 helping the Tigers gain promotion to the Premier League on the final day of the season. He signed a new one-year contract with Hull on 16 May 2013. Faye made limited appearances during the 2013–14 season, making only 3 Premier League appearances after falling behind Curtis Davies, James Chester, Alex Bruce and Paul McShane in the pecking order for the centre-back positions. Faye did make 3 appearances in the FA cup as Hull City reached the FA cup final for the first time in their history, however Faye was an unused substitute for the Wembley semi-final, and did not make the bench for the FA cup final. Thirty-six-year-old Faye was released by Hull City at the end of the 2013–14 season.

=== Later career ===
In December 2014 Faye joined Malaysia Premier League side Sabah FA.

== Career statistics ==
=== Club ===
Appearances and goals by club, season and competition
Club	Season	League			National Cup		League Cup		Europe		Total	
Club	Season	Division	Apps	Goals	Apps	Goals	Apps	Goals	Apps	Goals	Apps	Goals
ASEC Ndiambour	1999–2000	Senegal Premier League					—		—			
ASEC Ndiambour	2000–01	Senegal Premier League					—		—			
ASEC Ndiambour	Total		59	8			—		—		59	8
Jeanne d'Arc	2001–02	Senegal Premier League	32	4			—		—		32	4
RC Lens	2002–03	Ligue 1	17	0	1	0	0	0	6 (Note: Appearances in UEFA Champions League)	0	24	0
RC Lens	2003–04	Ligue 1	18	0	1	0	0	0	0	0	19	0
RC Lens	Total		35	0	2	0	0	0	6	0	43	0
Istres (loan)	2004–05	Ligue 1	28	0	0	0	0	0	—		28	0
Bolton Wanderers	2005–06	Premier League	27	1	1	0	2	0	7 (Note: Appearances in UEFA Cup)	0	37	1
Bolton Wanderers	2006–07	Premier League	32	2	2	0	0	0	—		34	2
Bolton Wanderers	2007–08	Premier League	1	0	0	0	0	0	—		1	0
Bolton Wanderers	Total		60	3	3	0	2	0	7	0	72	3
Newcastle United	2007–08	Premier League	22	1	1	0	1	0	—		24	1
Stoke City	2008–09	Premier League	36	3	0	0	0	0	—		36	3
Stoke City	2009–10	Premier League	31	2	1	0	0	0	—		32	2
Stoke City	2010–11	Premier League	14	1	2	0	0	0	—		16	1
Stoke City	Total		81	6	3	0	0	0	0	0	84	6
West Ham United	2011–12	Championship	29	0	0	0	0	0	—		29	0
Hull City	2012–13	Championship	31	4	0	0	2	0	—		33	4
Hull City	2013–14	Premier League	3	0	3	0	1	0	—		7	0
Hull City	Total		34	4	3	0	3	0	0	0	40	4
Sabah FA	2015	Malaysia Premier League	21	1	—		—		—		21	1
Career total			401	27	12	0	6	0	13	0	432	27

=== International ===
National team	Year	Apps	Goals
Senegal	2002	2	0
Senegal	2003	1	0
Senegal	2004	7	0
Senegal	2005	5	1
Senegal	2006	7	0
Senegal	2007	3	0
Senegal	2008	9	1
Senegal	2009	1	0
Senegal	2010	1	0
Total		36	2

== Honours ==
Stoke City

- FA Cup runner-up: 2010–11

Hull City

- Football League Championship runner-up: 2012–13

Senegal

- Africa Cup of Nations fourth place: 2006

Individual

- Stoke City Player of the Year: 2008–09
