= Robert Sissons =

English footballer

Personal information
- Full name: Robert Michael James Sissons
- Date of birth: 29 September 1988 (age 38)
- Place of birth: Stockport, England
- Height: 5 ft 8 in (1.73 m)
- Position: Midfielder

Youth career
- –2006: Bolton Wanderers

Senior career*
Years	Team	Apps	(Gls)
2006–2009	Bolton Wanderers	0	(0)
2012–2013	Droylsden	29	(3)
Total		29	(3)

International career
2004	England U17	7	(1)
- * Club domestic league appearances and goals

Robert Michael James Sissons (born 29 September 1988) is former English professional footballer who played as a defensive midfielder.

He made his professional debut in his only appearance for Bolton Wanderers on 7 January 2006. He came on as an 84th-minute substitute for Bruno Ngotty in a 3–0 win away to Watford.

On 15 June 2009 it was confirmed that Sissons would be leaving Bolton at the end of his contract, alongside Nathan Woolfe, Blerim Džemaili and James Sinclair. From here he accepted a place at the University of Manchester to read Law where he captained the University's men's football team.

In 2012, he joined Droylsden of the Conference North. He played 29 games for the Bloods in his only season, scoring in a 5–2 win over Vauxhall Motors on 27 August, a 4–2 home loss to Solihull Moors on 8 September, and a 2–2 draw at Hinckley United on 18 April 2013.

== International career ==
Sissons made seven appearances for the England under-17 side in 2004, playing in the Nordic Cup and Pepsi International Tournament.

== Career statistics ==
As of match played 7 January 2006

Appearances and goals by club, season and competition
Club	Season	League			FA Cup		EFL Cup		Other		Total	
Club	Season	Division	Apps	Goals	Apps	Goals	Apps	Goals	Apps	Goals	Apps	Goals
Bolton Wanderers	2005–06	Premier League	0	0	1	0	0	0	0	0	1	0
Droylsden	2012-13	Conference North	29	3	0	0	0	0	0	0	29	3
Career total			29	3	1	0	0	0	0	0	30	3
