= Daniel Day Wiley =

- Born: August 10, 1837; Readsboro, Vermont, U.S.
- Died: January 25, 1893; Sudbury Centre, Massachusetts, U.S.
- Burial place: Greenlawn Cemetery, Baldwinville, Massachusetts
- Military career
- Allegiance: United States (Union)
- Branch: United States Army (Union Army)
- Service years: 1861–1866
- Rank: Brevet Brigadier General
- Unit: 21st Regiment Massachusetts Volunteer Infantry
- Commands: Chief Commissary, City Point Depot, Army of the Potomac
- Conflicts: American Civil War
- Awards: Brevet promotions to Lt. Colonel, Colonel, and Brigadier General
- Other work: Merchant, United States Customs Service agent

Daniel Day Wiley (August 10, 1837 – January 25, 1893) was a Union Army officer during the American Civil War.

Wiley was born in Readsboro, Vermont, on August 10, 1837. He was a merchant before the Civil War.

Wiley enlisted as a sergeant in the 21st Regiment Massachusetts Volunteer Infantry, July 19, 1861, and was mustered out of the volunteers on November 20, 1861. He was appointed a captain in the Commissary of Subsistence Department of the United States Volunteers on August 28, 1862. He was appointed a brevet major to rank from August 1, 1864. In the last year of the war, Wiley was Chief Commissary, City Point Depot, Army of the Potomac.

Wiley was mustered out of the volunteers on October 26, 1866. He received appointments to the brevet grades of lieutenant colonel, colonel, and brigadier general, all to rank from March 13, 1865. On December 3, 1867, President Andrew Johnson nominated Wiley for appointment to the grade of brevet brigadier general of volunteers, to rank from March 13, 1865, and the United States Senate confirmed the appointment on February 14, 1868.

Wiley was a merchant and United States Customs Service agent after he was mustered out. Daniel Day Wiley died January 25, 1893, at Sudbury Centre, Massachusetts. He was interred at Greenlawn Cemetery, Baldwinville, Massachusetts.

== See also ==
- List of American Civil War brevet generals (Union)
