= Charles Wiley (priest) =

Irish Anglican priest

Charles Ormsby Wiley (30 July 1839 – 11 March 1915) was an Anglican priest in Ireland in the late nineteenth and early 20th centuries.

Wiley was born in Dublin and educated at Trinity College, Dublin and ordained in 1863. After a curacies in Trim and Tullow he was Rector of Crossmolina from 1872. He was Archdeacon of Killala from 1903 to 1904; and Dean of Killala from 1908 until his death.
