= James Sinclair (footballer) =

English footballer (born 1987)

Personal information
- Full name: James Alexander Sinclair
- Date of birth: 22 October 1987 (age 39)
- Place of birth: Newcastle upon Tyne, England
- Height: 5 ft 8 in (1.73 m)
- Positions: Full back; winger

Youth career
- Alnwick Town
- Newcastle United
- Sunderland
- 2004–2007: Bolton Wanderers

Senior career*
| Years | Team | Apps | (Gls) |
| 2007–2009 | Bolton Wanderers | 2 | (0) |
| 2010 | Gateshead | 5 | (0) |
| 2010 | Sektzia Nes Tziona | 3 | (0) |
| 2011 | Sevilla FC Puerto Rico | 0 | (0) |
| 2011–2012 | Polonia Bytom | 16 | (0) |
| 2013–2014 | Ljungskile SK | 50 | (6) |
| 2015 | Östersund | 10 | (0) |
| 2016–2017 | GAIS | 45 | (3) |
| 2018–2019 | Morecambe | 1 | (0) |
| 2019–2021 | Oskarshamns AIK | 4 | (0) |
| Total | | 136 | (9) |
- * Club domestic league appearances and goals

James Alexander Sinclair (born 22 October 1987) is an English former professional footballer who played as a full back or winger.

He played in the Premier League and the UEFA Cup for Bolton Wanderers.

== Career ==
As a schoolboy, Sinclair was both a promising track and field athlete – he came second in the English Schools' championships at 200 metres, won a Scottish decathlon title, and set an under-15 United Kingdom indoor record for the 50 metres – and a prolific goalscorer. He played for Alnwick Town Juniors, Northumberland Boys – for whom he set a schools record, scoring nine goals in a county under-16s match against South Yorkshire – and the youth academies of Sunderland and Newcastle United, prior to signing scholarship forms with Bolton Wanderers in summer 2004.

Bolton Wanderers
At 16 he scored on his first team debut in a pre-season friendly game against Sheffield Wednesday F.C, and was then an unused substitute the next day against Inter Milan. He broke his leg the same year, but quickly returned to fitness. During the 2006–07 season, he converted from the role of attacker to right wing back with success. Sinclair agreed his first professional contract shortly before making his first-team debut for Bolton, on 28 April 2007 in the 2–2 Premier League draw away to Chelsea, coming on as a 77th-minute substitute to replace Idan Tal. He drew praise from player-coach Gary Speed both for his play and for his character.

Sinclair also played in the 2007 Peace Cup pre-season tournament, under Sammy Lee's management, He played in every pre-season match for the club that summer as both right back and in midfield. He made his first competitive appearance of the 2007–08 season as a very late substitute in the UEFA Cup group stage away at Red Star Belgrade, in December 2007 as the Wanderers secured a victory. In May 2008 he was offered a new deal to stay at the Reebok Stadium, but was released at the end of the 2008–09 season.

Gateshead F.C.
Sinclair joined Conference National side Gateshead on non-contract terms on 26 January 2010, making his debut the same day in a 2–0 defeat to Kettering Town. Sinclair scored his first goal for Gateshead on 9 February against Barrow in the FA Trophy. In May 2010, once his non-contract deal expired Sinclair decided to look at other options abroad.

Sektzia Nes Tziona
In October 2010, Sinclair signed for Israeli club Sektzia Nes Tziona. He made his debut on 26 October 2010 against Hapoel Ironi Rishon LeZion in the Toto Cup. He scored his first goal for Nes Tziona on 9 November against Maccabi Ahi Nazareth, also in the Toto Cup. Financial reasons stopped the club from obtaining a longer work visa for Sinclair to carry on playing in Israel

Sevilla FC Puerto Rico
In March 2011, Sinclair registered with Sevilla FC Puerto Rico, a sister team of the Spanish club Sevilla FC based in Puerto Rico. The team were playing in the newly created USL Pro league in the United States. However, after the club folded from the league early during the season on he was unable to make an appearance for the club as his Visa wasn't resolved.

Polonia Bytom
In July 2011, he joined the Polish club Polonia Bytom on a two-year contract. He made his debut on 31 July 2011, against Warta Poznan. On 29 October 2012, he mutually terminated his contract with the club.

Ljungskile SK
In January 2013, he signed a 1-year contract with Swedish Superettan club Ljungskile SK after impressing the coaching staff during his trial period. On 5 September 2013, Sinclair signed a new 1-year extension at Ljungskile SK.

Östersunds FK
In January 2015, he joined the Swedish Superettan club Östersund

GAIS
In December 2015, he signed a two-year deal with the Superettan club GAIS, based in Gothenburg.

Morecambe
Having missed most of the season through injury, Sinclair was released by Morecambe FC at the end of the 2018–19 season.

Oskarshamns
On 28 July 2019, Sinclair returned to Sweden to join Division 1 side Oskarshamn on a 2 1/2-year deal. On 31 January 2021 he announced his retirement on Twitter.
