= Steve Bennett (referee) =

English football referee

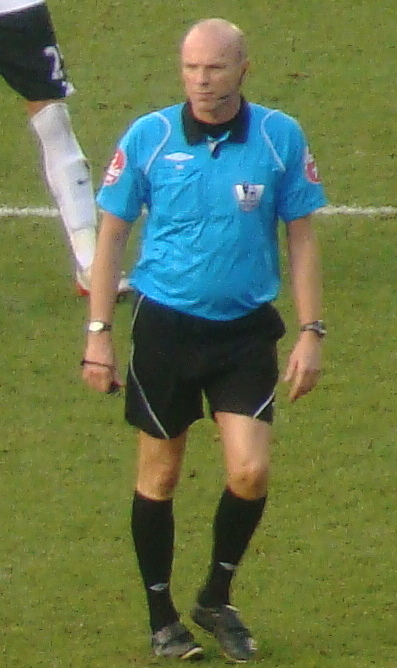
- Full name: Stephen Graham Bennett
- Born: 17 January 1961 (age 65); Farnborough, Kent, England

Domestic
Years	League	Role
1988 – ?	Kent League	Referee
? – ?	Isthmian League	Referee
? –1992	Football Conference	Referee
1992–1993	Football League	Asst. referee
1993–1995	Premier League	Asst. referee
1995–1999	Football League	Referee
1999–2010	Premier League	Referee

International
Years	League	Role
1995–2001	FIFA listed	Asst. referee
2001–2006	FIFA listed	Referee

Stephen Graham Bennett (born 17 January 1961) is an English former football referee who operated in the Premier League, and previously for FIFA as an assistant referee and then referee.

== Career ==
Bennett has been a referee since 1984, starting out in his home county of Kent.

In 1995, he began refereeing in the Football League, and since 1999 in the Premier League. In 2001, he was appointed as an official FIFA referee.

Bennett took charge of an official friendly international match, known as "The Other Final", in 2002, between the two lowest FIFA-ranked teams in the world at the time, Bhutan and Montserrat, at the Changlimithang Stadium, Thimphu, Bhutan. This took place on the morning of the World Cup Final in that year, and the home side won 4–0. The subsequent documentary film, entitled The Other Final and directed by Dutchman Johan Kramer, was released in 2003.

In 2004, Bennett was criticised by FIFA president Sepp Blatter for having sent off Everton's Tim Cahill for removing his shirt after scoring against Manchester City.

Bennett refereed the 2005 League Cup final at the Millennium Stadium between Chelsea and Liverpool, which the London club won by 3 goals to 2. In October 2005, he was in charge of the World Cup qualifier between Norway and Moldova, when the home side won 1–0 with a goal from Sigurd Rushfeldt.

He took charge of the UEFA Champions League quarter final first leg match in March 2006 between Benfica and Barcelona, the game ending 0–0.

Bennett was chosen to referee the 2007 FA Cup Final between Chelsea and Manchester United on 19 May 2007, the first at the new Wembley Stadium. Chelsea won by 1–0, Didier Drogba scoring late in the second half of extra time. Bennett issued seven bookings, four of which came in the added 30 minutes. In the first period of extra time, Ryan Giggs' shot was gathered by Petr Čech. Giggs claimed that the ball had crossed the line, despite sliding into the goalkeeper and seemingly forcing the Chelsea man backwards, but Bennett did not award a goal.

Bennett sent off Liverpool's Argentine Midfielder Javier Mascherano after he continued to harass him when he refereed the Manchester United versus Liverpool Premier League encounter on 22 March 2008. Mascherano initially claimed innocence, before later apologising for his actions and admitting his behavior was inappropriate.

Bennett retired from the FIFA list of referees in 2006, at the compulsory age of 45.

In July 2009, Bennett was invited by the England and Wales Cricket Board Association of Cricket Officials to sit as an Independent Director on the new ACO Board.

In July 2010, Bennett retired from refereeing and agreed to become a full-time referee coach, sharing his knowledge in developing the next generation of referees.

== Career statistics ==
Season	Games	Total (yellow card)	(yellow card) per game	Total (red card)	(red card) per game
1997–98	36	128	3.56	12	0.33
1998–99	39	162	4.15	10	0.26
1999–00	33	107	3.24	2	0.06
2000–01	31	87	2.81	8	0.26
2001–02	33	105	3.18	8	0.24
2002–03	38	148	3.89	7	0.18
2003–04	35	103	2.94	12	0.34
2004–05	42	169	4.02	10	0.24
2005–06	42	141	3.36	12	0.29
2006–07	45	151	3.35	14	0.31
2007–08	41	128	3.12	9	0.21
2008–09	31	118	3.80	1	0.03
2009–10	34	124	3.65	6	0.18

(There are no available records prior to 1997/1998)

== Statistics ==
=== 3 red cards in a game ===
- October 1997, Portsmouth (Thompson) v. Bradford (Kulcsar, Pepper)
- January 2001, Tottenham (Sullivan) v. Newcastle (Solano, Dyer)
- November 2006, Colchester (Barker) v. Southend (Maher, Gower)

=== 10 cards in a game ===
- October 1998, Notts County ( (yellow card) (yellow card) (yellow card) (red card) ) v. Lincoln ( (yellow card) (yellow card) (yellow card) (yellow card) (yellow card) (red card) )
- November 2002, Tottenham ( (yellow card) (yellow card) (yellow card) ) v. Leeds ( (yellow card) (yellow card) (yellow card) (yellow card) (yellow card) (yellow card) (yellow card) )
- March 2005, Bolton ( (yellow card) (yellow card) (yellow card) (yellow card) (yellow card) (red card) ) v. Arsenal ( (yellow card) (yellow card) (yellow card) (yellow card) )
- June 2005, Spain ( (yellow card) ) v. Bosnia and Herzegovina ( (yellow card) (yellow card) (yellow card) (yellow card) (yellow card) (yellow card) (yellow card) (red card) (red card) )

Preceded by Alan Wiley	FA Community Shield; 2003	Succeeded by Mike Dean
Preceded by Mike Riley	League Cup Final; 2005	Succeeded by Alan Wiley
Preceded by Alan Wiley	FA Cup Final Referee; 2007	Succeeded by Mike Dean
