= Rob Styles =

English football referee (born 1964)

- Full name: Robert Styles
- Born: 21 April 1964 (age 62); Waterlooville, Hampshire, England

Domestic
| Years | League | Role |
| 1987–? | Wessex League | Referee |
| 2000-2000 | The Football League | Referee |
| 2000–2009 | Premier League | Referee |

International
| Years | League | Role |
| 2002–2002 | FIFA listed | Referee |

Robert Styles (born 21 April 1964) is an English football Referee from Waterlooville, Hampshire. Throughout his career he officiated in the multiple lower level leagues before making the national list in 1996. He refereed his first FA Premier League game in 2000, and became FIFA listed in 2002. Styles retired from refereeing in 2009.

== Career ==
Styles began refereeing in 1987, officiating in the Wessex League and then the Isthmian League before being appointed to the National List of referees in 1996. The year 2000 was a busy one for Styles. He handled a Football League First Division play-off semi-final, and a Second Division play-off semi-final, plus the Second Division play-off final itself, between Wigan Athletic and Gillingham at Wembley, which ended 2–3 after extra time. He was also fourth official for both the Football League Trophy final of that year between Stoke City and Bristol City, and the 2000 FA Trophy Final, when Kingstonian beat Kettering Town 3–2.

His promotion to the Premier League list also happened in the year 2000, and his first match in the top group was the 1–0 win by Leicester City at West Ham United on 23 August 2000, Darren Eadie scoring the goal. He became a FIFA referee in 2002.

He was referee for the 2003 FA Youth Cup Final when Manchester United beat Middlesbrough 3–1. However, his highest honour was his selection as referee for the 2005 FA Cup Final at the Millennium Stadium, Cardiff, between Arsenal and Manchester United, which the Gunners won 5–4 on penalties after a 0–0 draw following extra time.

In August 2007 Styles refereed the Premier League game between Liverpool and Chelsea where he wrongly awarded a penalty to Chelsea and then caused confusion by showing two yellow cards for a single incident. As a result of his decision to award the penalty and the confusion regarding the yellow cards, it was announced by Keith Hackett, general manager of Professional Game Match Officials Limited (PGMOL), that Styles would be "dropped" for one round of matches.

Styles last game the West Bromwich Albion and Manchester United match in January 2009. He sent off West Brom defender Paul Robinson five minutes before half time. In the following days the red card was overturned by the F.A. Two days after the overturning Styles retired from refereeing, citing the lack of support from the FA as his main reason.

== Career statistics ==
| Season | Games | Total (yellow card) | (yellow card) per game | Total (red card) | (red card) per game |
|---|---|---|---|---|---|
| 1997/1998 | 35 | 151 | 4.31 | 16 | 0.45 |
| 1998/1999 | 40 | 213 | 5.32 | 17 | 0.42 |
| 1999/2000 | 40 | 96 | 2.40 | 10 | 0.25 |
| 2000/2001 | 31 | 98 | 3.16 | 12 | 0.38 |
| 2001/2002 | 28 | 108 | 3.85 | 8 | 0.28 |
| 2002/2003 | 35 | 119 | 3.40 | 13 | 0.37 |
| 2003/2004 | 37 | 123 | 3.32 | 16 | 0.43 |
| 2004/2005 | 41 | 124 | 3.02 | 9 | 0.21 |
| 2005/2006 | 45 | 148 | 3.28 | 5 | 0.11 |
| 2006/2007 | 44 | 143 | 3.25 | 10 | 0.22 |
| 2007/2008 | 34 | 117 | 3.44 | 15 | 0.44 |
| 2008/2009 | 36 | 107 | 2.97 | 7 | 0.19 |

| Preceded by Jeff Winter | FA Cup Final Referee; 2005 | Succeeded by Alan Wiley |
