= Alan Wiley =

English football referee (born 1960)

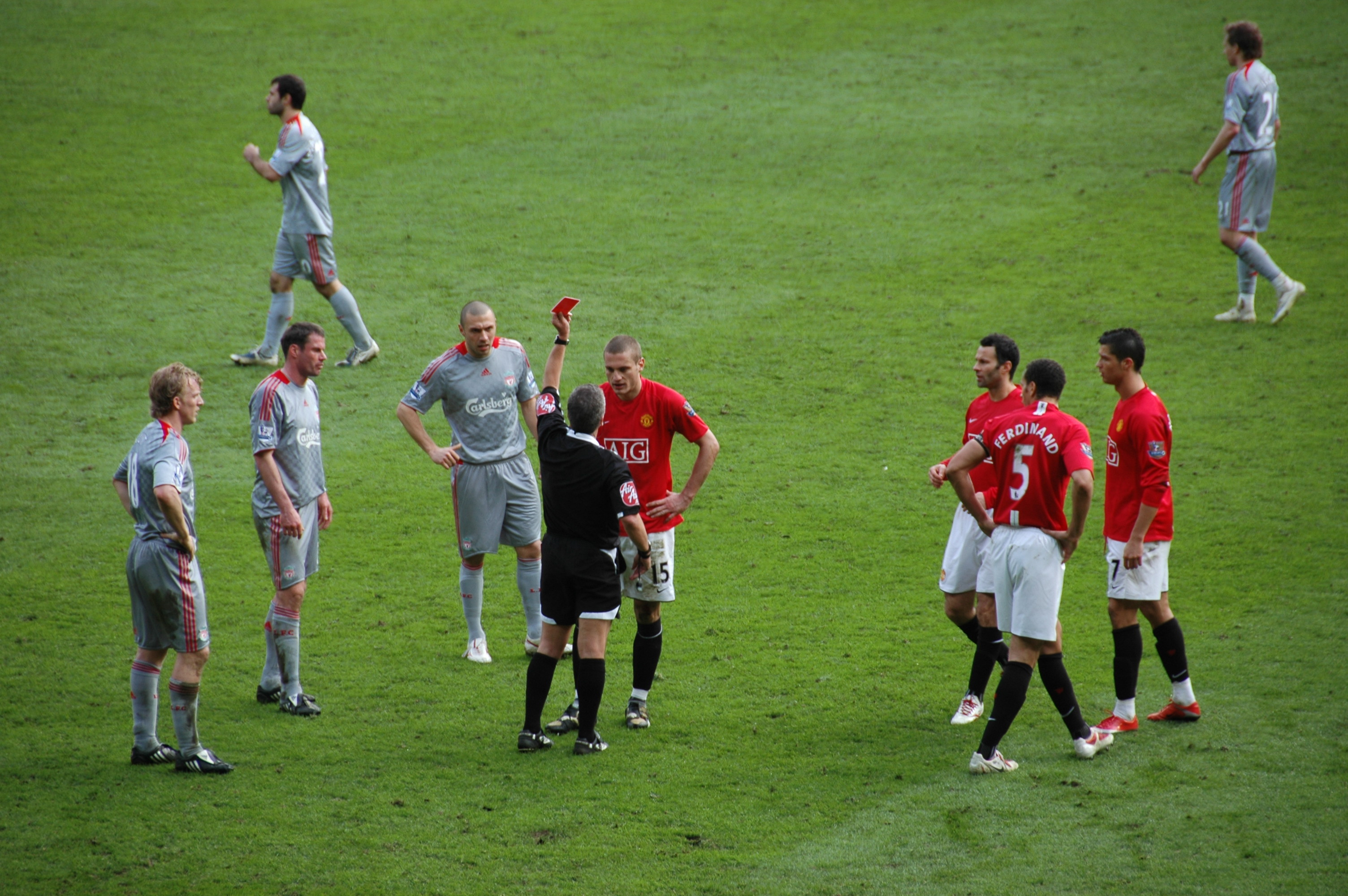
- Born: 27 May 1960 (age 66); Burntwood, Staffordshire, England

Domestic
Years	League	Role
?–1991	West Midlands	Referee
1991–1994	Football League	Asst. ref.
1994–1995	Premier League	Asst. ref.
1995–1999	Football League	Referee
1999–2010	Premier League	Referee

Alan G. Wiley (born 27 May 1960) is a former English football referee in the FA Premier League, who is based in Burntwood, Staffordshire.

== Career ==
Wiley first took up the whistle in 1981, then officiated in the West Midlands (Regional) League until 1991, when he became an assistant referee on the Football League List. In 1994, he was promoted to the FA Premier League List of assistant referees, and a year later progressed to the Football League referees' List.

In 1998, he refereed the FA Women's Cup Final, when Arsenal beat Croydon 3–2. Wiley made the step up to full Premier League referee in 1999, taking charge of his first match on 11 August 1999 at The Dell between Southampton and Leeds United, which the away side won 3–0.

In 2000, he was fourth official for the FA Cup Final at Wembley, when Chelsea defeated Aston Villa 1–0, courtesy of a Roberto Di Matteo goal after 73 minutes.

He was subsequently given the honour of refereeing two Football League Cup semi-finals (2003 and 2006), but his first prestige men's game as man-in-the-middle was the Community Shield match at the Millennium Stadium, Cardiff, between Arsenal and Liverpool on 11 August 2002. The London side ran out 1–0 winners, thanks to a Gilberto Silva goal in the second half.

Wiley was the referee for the 2005–06 League Cup final between Manchester United and Wigan Athletic, also at the Millennium Stadium – United winning 4–0.

He then took charge of the FA Cup Final on 13 May 2006 when Liverpool played West Ham United, at the same venue. Mike Dean was originally appointed to referee the game but the Football Association took the unusual step of replacing him after concerns were raised about his ability to be impartial towards Liverpool, who are based near Dean's home town on Merseyside. In the game, Liverpool triumphed on penalties by 3–1, the score at the end of extra time being 3 goals each.

On 24 May 2008, Wiley took charge of the Championship Playoff Final between Hull City and Bristol City at Wembley Stadium, a match which Hull City won.

Wiley officiated the match between Manchester United and Liverpool at Old Trafford on 14 March 2009, in which he awarded two penalty kicks (one to Manchester United and one to Liverpool,) as well as a red card to United's Nemanja Vidić. Commentator Andy Gray said on Sky Sports's TV commentary, following Vidić's dismissal that, "Alan Wiley, in my opinion, has got all the big decisions (today) right." Liverpool's Fabio Aurelio would score the resulting free-kick, putting his team up 3–1 in a match they won by a final scoreline of 4–1.

On 15 August 2009, he had the honour of refereeing the first game of the new Premier League season between Chelsea F.C. and Hull City A.F.C., Chelsea ran out 2–1 winners.

In July 2010, Wiley agreed to retire from refereeing and became a full-time referee coach, sharing his expertise in developing the next generation of referees.

He currently holds an FA Preliminary Coaching Badge.

== Career statistics ==
Season	Games	Total (yellow card)	(yellow card) per game	Total (red card)	(red card) per game
1997/1998	41	126	3.07	4	0.10
1998/1999	40	158	3.95	7	0.18
1999/2000	34	101	2.97	3	0.09
2000/2001	40	124	3.10	2	0.05
2001/2002	34	90	2.65	3	0.09
2002/2003	35	99	2.83	5	0.14
2003/2004	28	93	3.32	3	0.11
2004/2005	32	78	2.44	5	0.16
2005/2006	44	142	3.23	7	0.16
2006/2007	42	135	3.21	4	0.09
2007/2008	40	125	3.12	3	0.07
2008/2009	6	17	2.83	1	0.16

(There are no available records prior to 1997/1998)

Preceded by Steve Dunn	FA Trophy Final; 2001	Succeeded by Neale Barry
Preceded by Andy D'Urso	FA Community Shield; 2002	Succeeded by Steve Bennett
Preceded by Steve Bennett	League Cup Final; 2006	Succeeded by Howard Webb
Preceded by Rob Styles	FA Cup Final; 2006	Succeeded by Steve Bennett
