= 1999 Football League Trophy final =

- Event: 1998–99 Football League Trophy
Millwall	Wigan Athletic
0	1
- Date: 18 April 1999
- Venue: Wembley Stadium, London
- Referee: C. R. Wilkes (Gloucester)
- Attendance: 55,349

The 1999 Football League Trophy final (known as the Auto Windscreens Shield for sponsorship reasons) was the 16th final of the domestic Football League Trophy competition for teams from the Second and Third Division of the Football League.

The match was played at Wembley Stadium on 18 April 1999, and was contested by Millwall and Wigan Athletic. This was Millwall's first appearance at Wembley in a recognised competition, and the club brought around 47,000 of the 55,000 fans in attendance.

Wigan won the match 1–0, with Paul Rogers scoring the winning goal three minutes into injury-time, one of only five goals he scored for the club in three years.

== Route to the final ==
The rounds were split into two sections: North and South. Wigan Athletic were the winning finalists of the Northern Section, and Millwall were the winners of the Southern Final.

=== Millwall ===
Round 1	Millwall	2–0	Cardiff City
Round 2	Brighton	1–5	Millwall
Quarter-final	Bournemouth	1–1	Millwall
	(Millwall won 4–3 on penalties)		
Semi-final	Millwall	1–0	Gillingham
Southern Final (1st leg)	Millwall	1–0	Walsall
Southern Final (2nd leg)	Walsall	1–1	Millwall
	(Millwall won 2–1 on aggregate)		

=== Wigan Athletic ===
Round 1	Rotherham	0–3	Wigan Athletic
Round 2	Wigan Athletic	3–0	Scarborough
Quarter-final	Carlisle United	0–3	Wigan Athletic
Semi-final	Rochdale	0–2	Wigan Athletic
Northern Final (1st leg)	Wigan Athletic	2–0	Wrexham
Northern Final (2nd leg)	Wrexham	2–3	Wigan Athletic
	(Wigan Athletic won 5–2 on aggregate)		

|}

== Match details ==
18 April 1999
14:00 BST

Millwall	0–1	Wigan Athletic
	Report	Rogers 90+3'

Wembley Stadium, London
Attendance: 55,349
Referee: C. R. Wilkes (Gloucester)

Millwall	Wigan Athletic

GK	Ben Roberts
DF	Gerard Lavin	Booked
DF	Jamie Stuart
DF	Stuart Nethercott
DF	Joe Dolan
MF	Tim Cahill
MF	Paul Ifill
MF	Ricky Newman	Booked
MF	Steven Reid
FW	Neil Harris
FW	Richard Sadlier
Substitutes:
MF	Paul Shaw
MF	Bobby Bowry
MF	Marc Bircham
Manager:
Keith Stevens

GK	Roy Carroll
DF	Carl Bradshaw (c)	Booked
DF	Pat McGibbon	Booked
DF	Stuart Balmer
DF	Kevin Sharp
DF	Colin Greenall
MF	Paul Rogers	Goal
MF	Michael O'Neill	Booked
FW	Andy Liddell
FW	Simon Haworth
FW	Stuart Barlow	(substituted off) 88'
Substitute:
DF	Scott Green
MF	David Lee	(substituted on) 88'
FW	Graeme Jones
Manager:
Ray Mathias

MATCH RULES

- 90 minutes.
- 30 minutes of extra-time if necessary.
- Penalty shoot-out if scores still level.
- Maximum of 3 substitutions.
