= 1998–99 Wigan Athletic F.C. season =

Wigan Athletic
1998–1999 season
- Chairman: Dave Whelan
- Manager: Ray Mathias
- Stadium: Springfield Park
- Second Division: 6th
- FA Cup: Second round
- League Cup: Second round
- Football League Trophy: Winners

During the 1998–99 English football season, Wigan Athletic F.C. competed in the Football League Second Division.

== Season summary ==
The season was a relatively successful one for the club, securing a play-off place by finishing 6th in the Second Division, and winning the Auto Windscreens Shield. Manager Ray Mathias was surprisingly sacked at the end of the season.

This was also the club's final season at Springfield Park.

== Transfers ==
=== In ===
Player	Pos	From	Fee	Date	Notes
Stuart Balmer	DF	Charlton Athletic	£200,000	18 September 1998	
Michael O'Neill	MF	Coventry City	Free	18 September 1998	
Simon Haworth	FW	Coventry City	£600,000	2 October 1998	
Andy Liddell	FW	Barnsley	£350,000	15 October 1998	

=== Out ===
Player	Pos	To	Fee	Date	Notes
Neil Mustoe	MF	Cambridge United	Free	9 July 1998	
Leigh Jenkinson	MF	Hearts	£50,000	30 December 1998	
Paul Warne	MF	Rotherham United	Free	15 January 1999	

=== Loans in ===
Player	Pos	From	Date	Duration	Notes
Eric Nixon	GK	Stockport County	28 August 1998	Two months	

=== Loans out ===
Player	Pos	To	Date	Duration	Notes
Paul Warne	MF	Kettering Town	5 November 1998	One month	
Jorg Smeets	MF	Chester City	25 March 1999	End of season	

== Results ==
Wigan Athletic's score comes first

Legend

Win	Draw	Loss

=== Pre-season ===
Date	Opponent	Venue	Result	Scorers	Notes
17 July 1998	Skelmersdale United	A	7–2		
21 July 1998	Bury	H	1–0		(Note: Lancashire Marsden Cup game)
22 July 1998	Chorley	A	2–0		
25 July 1998	Morecambe	A	6–1		
28 July 1998	Rochdale	H	3–1		
29 July 1998	St Helens Town	A	5–0		

=== Football League Second Division ===
Date	Opponent	Venue	Result	Scorers
8 August 1998	Millwall	H	0–1	
15 August 1998	Lincoln City	A	0–1	
22 August 1998	Blackpool	H	3–0	Barlow (2), Lee
29 August 1998	Bristol Rovers	A	2–3	Barlow, McGibbon
31 August 1998	Luton Town	H	1–3	Barlow
5 September 1998	Notts County	H	1–0	Barlow
8 September 1998	Colchester United	A	1–1	Lee
12 September 1998	Bournemouth	A	0–1	
19 September 1998	Macclesfield Town	H	2–0	Lee, Barlow
26 September 1998	Burnley	A	1–1	McGibbon
3 October 1998	Northampton Town	H	1–0	Dobson (o.g.)
9 October 1998	Oldham Athletic	A	3–2	Bradshaw, Barlow, Warne
17 October 1998	Manchester City	H	0–1	
24 October 1998	Stoke City	A	1–2	Barlow
31 October 1998	York City	H	5–0	Jones (o.g.), Greenall, Haworth (2), Liddell
7 November 1998	Gillingham	A	0–2	
11 November 1998	Reading	A	1–0	Bradshaw (pen.)
21 November 1998	Wycombe Wanderers	H	0–0	
28 November 1998	Preston North End	A	2–2	Greenall, Porter
1 December 1998	Fulham	H	2–0	McGibbon, Lowe
12 December 1998	Wrexham	H	1–1	Lee
19 December 1998	Chesterfield	A	1–1	Greenall
26 December 1998	Blackpool	A	1–1	Liddell
28 December 1998	Walsall	H	2–0	Barlow (2)
9 January 1999	Millwall	A	1–3	Jones
23 January 1999	Luton Town	A	4–0	McGibbon, Liddell, Jones, Haworth
30 January 1999	Walsall	A	2–1	Jones, Barlow
12 February 1999	Colchester United	A	1–2	Sharp
16 February 1999	Notts County	H	3–0	Bradshaw (pen.), Barlow, Liddell
20 February 1999	Bournemouth	H	2–1	Liddell, Barlow
27 February 1999	Macclesfield Town	A	1–0	Lee
13 March 1999	Gillingham	H	4–1	Rogers, Haworth (2), Barlow
20 March 1999	York City	A	3–1	Lee, Sharp, Greenall
27 March 1999	Stoke City	H	2–3	Liddell, Barlow
30 March 1999	Bristol Rovers	H	1–0	Bradshaw (pen.)
3 April 1999	Manchester City	A	0–1	
5 April 1999	Oldham Athletic	H	2–0	Haworth, Bradshaw (pen.)
10 April 1999	Fulham	A	0–2	
13 April 1999	Preston North End	H	2–2	Liddell, Haworth
24 April 1999	Reading	H	4–1	Rogers, Barlow (2), Greenall
27 April 1999	Lincoln City	H	3–1	Greenall, Liddell, Bradshaw (pen.)
29 April 1999	Northampton Town	A	3–3	Haworth, Barlow (pen), McGibbon
1 May 1999	Wrexham	A	2–0	Barlow, Haworth
3 May 1999	Burnley	H	0–0	
5 May 1999	Wycombe Wanderers	A	1–2	Haworth
8 May 1999	Chesterfield	H	3–1	Liddell (2), McGibbon

=== Final league table ===
Pos	Team	Pld	W	D	L	GF	GA	GD	Pts	Qualification or relegation
4	Gillingham	46	22	14	10	75	44	+31	80	Qualification for the Second Division play-offs
5	Preston North End	46	22	13	11	78	50	+28	79	Qualification for the Second Division play-offs
6	Wigan Athletic	46	22	10	14	75	48	+27	76	Qualification for the Second Division play-offs
7	Bournemouth	46	21	13	12	63	41	+22	76	
8	Stoke City	46	21	6	19	59	63	−4	69	

Rules for classification: 1) Points; 2) Goals scored; 3) Goal difference

=== Second Division play-offs ===
Round	Date	Opponent	Venue	Result	Goalscorers	Notes
SF 1st Leg	15 May 1999	Manchester City	H	1–1	Barlow	
SF 2nd Leg	19 May 1999	Manchester City	A	0–1		
Manchester City won 2-1 on aggregate

=== FA Cup ===
Round	Date	Opponent	Venue	Result	Goalscorers	Notes
R1	14 November 1998	Blackpool	H	4–3	Greenall, Haworth, Barlow, Lowe	
R2	5 December 1998	Notts County	A	1–1	Lowe	
R2R	15 December 1998	Notts County	H	0–0		Notts County won 4-2 on penalties

=== League Cup ===
Round	Date	Opponent	Venue	Result	Goalscorers	Notes
R1 1st Leg	11 August 1998	Rochdale	A	1–0	Hill (o.g.)	
R1 2nd Leg	18 August 1998	Rochdale	H	1–0	Lowe	Wigan won 2-0 on aggregate
R2 1st Leg	14 September 1999	Norwich City	A	0–1		
R2 2nd Leg	21 September 1999	Norwich City	H	2-3	Griffiths, Barlow	Norwich won 4-2 on aggregate

=== Football League Trophy ===
Round	Date	Opponent	Venue	Result	Goalscorers	Notes
R1N	8 December 1998	Rotherham United	A	3–0	Barlow (pen.), Warne, Balmer	
R2N	19 January 1999	Scarborough	H	3–0	O'Neill, Jones, Lee	
QFN	26 January 1999	Carlisle United	A	3–0	Haworth, Barlow, Kilford	
SFN	8 March 1999	Rochdale	A	2–0	Barlow, O'Neill	
FN	16 March 1999	Wrexham	H	2–0	Sharp, Barlow	
FN	23 March 1999	Wrexham	A	3–2	Haworth (2), O'Neill	Wigan won 5-2 on aggregate
F	18 April 1999	Millwall	N	1–0	Rogers	
