= 1994–95 Leicester City F.C. season =

1994–95 season of Leicester City

Leicester City
1994–95 season
- Chairman: Martin George
- Manager: Brian Little (until 22 November); Kevin MacDonald (caretaker 22 November - 14 December); Mark McGhee (from 14 December)
- Premiership: 21st (relegated)
- FA Cup: Fifth round
- League Cup: Second round
- Top goalscorer: League: Roberts (9); All: Roberts (11)
- Highest home attendance: 21,393 vs Liverpool (26 Dec 1994, Premier League)
- Lowest home attendance: 14,258 vs Brighton & HA (5 Oct 1994, League Cup)
- Average home league attendance: 19,532

During the 1994–95 English football season, Leicester City F.C. competed in the FA Premier League.

== Season summary ==
Leicester City finally made it back to the top flight after a seven-year exile and two successive Wembley playoff final defeats. Even with one of the country's most sought-after young managers in Brian Little, they were still tipped to go straight back down to the First Division. They would ultimately have a very shaky to indifferent start to the season, winning just two of their first 10 games, yet one of them being perhaps their finest performance of the season. On 16 October, they were 4–1 leaders against Southampton by 82 minutes; however, their leaky defense would be evident for the rest of the season (they eventually conceded 80 league goals and only kept four clean sheets all season) and within the final two minutes of that game, they conceded two goals to only narrowly win the game 4–3. By the time manager Brian Little moved to Aston Villa in November, the Foxes looked doomed, and Little's successor Mark McGhee was unable to prove the pundits wrong. Leicester were never out of the bottom two after November and were relegated with just 6 wins and only Ipswich Town below them. The sale of key player Mark Draper at least gave the club a cash windfall to reduce the financial impact of relegation.

== Final league table ==
Pos	Team	Pld	W	D	L	GF	GA	GD	Pts	Qualification or relegation
18	Aston Villa	42	11	15	16	51	56	−5	48	
19	Crystal Palace (R)	42	11	12	19	34	49	−15	45	Relegation to Football League First Division
20	Norwich City (R)	42	10	13	19	37	54	−17	43	Relegation to Football League First Division
21	Leicester City (R)	42	6	11	25	45	80	−35	29	Relegation to Football League First Division
22	Ipswich Town (R)	42	7	6	29	36	93	−57	27	Relegation to Football League First Division

Source: Premier League
Rules for classification: 1) points; 2) goal difference; 3) number of goals scored.
(R) Relegated

Results summary

Overall								Home						Away					
Pld	W	D	L	GF	GA	GD	Pts	W	D	L	GF	GA	GD	W	D	L	GF	GA	GD
42	6	11	25	45	80	−35	29	5	6	10	28	37	−9	1	5	15	17	43	−26

Source: Statto

Results by round

Round	1	2	3	4	5	6	7	8	9	10	11	12	13	14	15	16	17	18	19	20	21	22	23	24	25	26	27	28	29	30	31	32	33	34	35	36	37	38	39	40	41	42
Ground	H	A	A	H	A	H	A	H	A	H	A	H	A	H	H	A	H	A	H	H	A	H	A	A	A	H	A	A	A	H	A	H	H	A	H	H	A	H	A	H	H	A
Result	L	L	L	D	L	W	D	D	L	W	L	L	L	L	W	L	D	L	D	L	D	L	L	L	W	L	D	D	L	D	L	L	L	L	L	W	L	L	L	W	D	D
Position	18	21	22	20	21	20	18	19	20	18	18	19	21	21	20	21	21	21	21	21	21	21	22	22	22	22	22	21	22	22	22	22	22	22	22	21	21	21	21	21	21	21

Source: Statto.com
A = Away; H = Home; W = Win; D = Draw; L = Loss

== Results ==
Leicester City's score comes first

=== Legend ===
Win	Draw	Loss

=== FA Premier League ===
Date	Opponent	Venue	Result	Attendance	Scorers
21 August 1994	Newcastle United	H	1–3	20,048	Joachim
23 August 1994	Blackburn Rovers	A	0–3	21,050	
27 August 1994	Nottingham Forest	A	0–1	21,601	
31 August 1994	Queens Park Rangers	H	1–1	18,695	Gee
10 September 1994	Wimbledon	A	1–2	7,683	Lowe
17 September 1994	Tottenham Hotspur	H	3–1	21,300	Joachim (2), Lowe
24 September 1994	Everton	A	1–1	28,003	Draper
3 October 1994	Coventry City	H	2–2	19,372	Roberts (2)
8 October 1994	Chelsea	A	0–4	18,397	
15 October 1994	Southampton	H	4–3	20,020	Blake (2), Roberts, Carr
24 October 1994	Leeds United	A	1–2	28,547	Blake
29 October 1994	Crystal Palace	H	0–1	20,022	
5 November 1994	West Ham United	A	0–1	18,780	
20 November 1994	Manchester City	H	0–1	19,006	
23 November 1994	Arsenal	H	2–1	20,774	Lowe, Seaman (own goal)
26 November 1994	Norwich City	A	1–2	20,657	Draper
3 December 1994	Aston Villa	H	1–1	20,896	Gee
10 December 1994	Newcastle United	A	1–3	34,400	Oldfield
17 December 1994	Blackburn Rovers	H	0–0	20,559	
26 December 1994	Liverpool	H	1–2	21,393	Roberts
28 December 1994	Manchester United	A	1–1	43,789	Whitlow
31 December 1994	Sheffield Wednesday	H	0–1	20,624	
2 January 1995	Ipswich Town	A	1–4	15,803	Roberts
14 January 1995	Crystal Palace	A	0–2	12,707	
25 January 1995	Manchester City	A	1–0	21,007	Robins
4 February 1995	West Ham United	H	1–2	20,375	Robins
11 February 1995	Arsenal	A	1–1	31,373	Draper
22 February 1995	Aston Villa	A	4–4	30,825	Robins, Roberts, Lowe (2)
25 February 1995	Coventry City	A	2–4	20,633	Lowe, Roberts
4 March 1995	Everton	H	2–2	20,447	Draper, Roberts
8 March 1995	Queens Park Rangers	A	0–2	10,189	
11 March 1995	Nottingham Forest	H	2–4	20,423	Lowe, Draper
15 March 1995	Leeds United	H	1–3	20,068	Roberts
18 March 1995	Tottenham Hotspur	A	0–1	30,851	
1 April 1995	Wimbledon	H	3–4	15,489	Robins, Willis, Lawrence
5 April 1995	Norwich City	H	1–0	15,992	Parker
8 April 1995	Sheffield Wednesday	A	0–1	22,551	
15 April 1995	Manchester United	H	0–4	21,281	
17 April 1995	Liverpool	A	0–2	36,012	
29 April 1995	Ipswich Town	H	2–0	15,248	Whitlow, Lowe
6 May 1995	Chelsea	H	1–1	18,140	Willis
14 May 1995	Southampton	A	2–2	15,101	Parker, Robins

=== FA Cup ===
Round	Date	Opponent	Venue	Result	Attendance	Goalscorers
R3	7 January 1995	Enfield	H	2–0	17,351	Oldfield, Roberts
R4	30 January 1995	Portsmouth	A	1–0	14,928	Roberts
R5	18 February 1995	Wolverhampton Wanderers	A	0–1	28,544	

=== League Cup ===
Round	Date	Opponent	Venue	Result	Attendance	Goalscorers
R2 1st Leg	21 September 1994	Brighton & Hove Albion	A	0–1	11,041	
R2 2nd Leg	5 October 1994	Brighton & Hove Albion	H	0–2 (lost 0–3 on agg)	14,258	

== Squad ==
Note: Flags indicate national team as defined under FIFA eligibility rules; some limited exceptions apply. Players may hold more than one non-FIFA nationality.

No.	Pos.	Nation	Player
1	GK	ENG	Gavin Ward
2	DF	ENG	Simon Grayson
3	DF	ENG	Mike Whitlow
4	DF	ENG	Jimmy Willis
5	DF	ENG	Steve Walsh (captain)
6	FW	ENG	Mark Robins
7	FW	ENG	Julian Joachim
8	MF	ENG	Mark Blake
9	FW	WAL	Iwan Roberts
10	MF	ENG	Mark Draper
11	FW	ENG	Ian Ormondroyd
12	DF	ENG	Richard Smith
14	DF	ENG	Nicky Mohan
15	DF	IRL	Brian Carey
18	MF	ENG	Garry Parker

No.	Pos.	Nation	Player
19	DF	ENG	Colin Hill
20	MF	ENG	David Oldfield
21	MF	ENG	Lee Philpott
22	DF	JAM	Jamie Lawrence
23	FW	ENG	Emile Heskey
24	DF	ENG	Neil Lewis
25	FW	ENG	David Lowe
26	FW	ENG	Phil Gee
27	FW	ENG	Lee Ellison
29	MF	ENG	Sam McMahon
30	MF	ENG	Ian Thompson
31	DF	ENG	Scott Eustace
32	GK	ENG	Russell Hoult
33	GK	ENG	Kevin Poole

=== Left the club during season ===
Note: Flags indicate national team as defined under FIFA eligibility rules; some limited exceptions apply. Players may hold more than one non-FIFA nationality.

No.	Pos.	Nation	Player
22	MF	ENG	Gary Mills (to Notts County)
16	MF	ENG	Franz Carr (to Aston Villa)
6	MF	ENG	Steve Agnew (to Sunderland)

No.	Pos.	Nation	Player
17	MF	ENG	Steve Thompson (to Burnley)
34	DF	SCO	Mike Galloway (on loan from Celtic)

== Transfers ==
=== In ===
Date	Pos	Name	From	Fee
7 July 1994	DF	Nicky Mohan	Middlesbrough	£330,000
22 July 1994	MF	Mark Draper	Notts County	£1,250,000
12 August 1994	FW	Lee Ellison	Darlington	Free transfer
11 October 1994	MF	Franz Carr	Sheffield United	£100,000
6 January 1995	DF	Jamie Lawrence	Doncaster Rovers	£125,000
16 January 1995	FW	Mark Robins	Norwich City	£1,000,000
10 February 1995	MF	Garry Parker	Aston Villa	£300,000

=== Out ===
Date	Pos	Name	To	Fee
25 July 1994	DF	Neal Timson	Hereford United	Free transfer
12 August 1994	DF	Colin Gibson	Blackpool	Free transfer
26 September 1994	MF	Gary Mills	Notts County	£50,000
11 January 1995	MF	Steve Agnew	Sunderland	£250,000
10 February 1995	MF	Franz Carr	Aston Villa	£250,000
24 February 1995	MF	Steve Thompson	Burnley	£200,000

Transfers in: ▼£3,105,000
Transfers out: ▲£750,000
Total spending: ▼£2,355,000
