= 1995–96 Leicester City F.C. season =

1995–96 season of Leicester City

Leicester City
1995–96 season
- Chairman: Martin George
- Manager: Mark McGhee (until 13 December); Martin O'Neill (from 21 December)
- Stadium: Filbert Street
- First Division: 5th (promoted via playoffs)
- FA Cup: Third round
- League Cup: Third round
- Top goalscorer: League: Roberts (19); All: Roberts (20)
- Highest home attendance: 20,911 vs. Derby County (28 February 1996)
- Lowest home attendance: 12,543 vs. Millwall (23 March 1996)
- Average home league attendance: 16,198

During the 1995–96 English football season, Leicester City F.C. competed in the Football League First Division.

== Season summary ==
Mark McGhee left the club unexpectedly in December 1995 whilst Leicester were top of Division One to take charge of Wolverhampton Wanderers. McGhee was replaced by Martin O'Neill. Under O'Neill, Leicester qualified for the 1995–96 Division One promotion playoffs and beat Crystal Palace 2–1 with a last-gasp Steve Claridge goal securing an immediate return to the Premiership.

== Final league table ==
Pos	Team	Pld	W	D	L	GF	GA	GD	Pts	Qualification or relegation
3	Crystal Palace	46	20	15	11	67	48	+19	75	Qualification for the First Division play-offs
4	Stoke City	46	20	13	13	60	49	+11	73	Qualification for the First Division play-offs
5	Leicester City (O, P)	46	19	14	13	66	60	+6	71	Qualification for the First Division play-offs
6	Charlton Athletic	46	17	20	9	57	45	+12	71	Qualification for the First Division play-offs
7	Ipswich Town	46	19	12	15	79	69	+10	69	

Rules for classification: 1) Points; 2) Goals scored; 3) Goal difference
(O) Play-off winners; (P) Promoted

== Results ==
Leicester City's score comes first

=== Legend ===
Win	Draw	Loss

=== Football League First Division ===
Date	Opponent	Venue	Result	Attendance	Scorers
12 August 1995	Sunderland	A	2–1	18,593	Corica, Robins
19 August 1995	Stoke City	H	2–3	17,719	Walsh, Parker (pen)
26 August 1995	Luton Town	A	1–1	7,612	Parker
30 August 1995	Portsmouth	H	4–2	15,170	Roberts (3), Parker
2 September 1995	Wolverhampton Wanderers	H	1–0	18,441	Whitlow
10 September 1995	Derby County	A	1–0	17,767	Joachim
12 September 1995	Port Vale	A	2–0	8,814	McMahon, Roberts
16 September 1995	Reading	H	1–1	19,103	Roberts
23 September 1995	Southend United	H	1–3	15,276	Lowe
30 September 1995	Norwich City	A	1–0	18,435	Heskey
7 October 1995	Barnsley	A	2–2	13,669	Robins, Walsh
14 October 1995	Charlton Athletic	H	1–1	16,771	Lowe
21 October 1995	Sheffield United	A	3–1	13,100	Roberts, Taylor, Lowe
28 October 1995	Crystal Palace	H	2–3	18,376	Robins, Taylor
5 November 1995	West Bromwich Albion	A	3–2	16,071	Taylor (2), Roberts
11 November 1995	Watford	H	1–0	16,230	Roberts
19 November 1995	Tranmere Rovers	H	0–1	13,125	
21 November 1995	Huddersfield Town	A	1–3	14,300	Robins
26 November 1995	Birmingham City	A	2–2	17,350	Roberts, Grayson
2 December 1995	Barnsley	H	2–2	15,125	Roberts, Grayson
9 December 1995	Southend United	A	1–2	5,835	Roberts
17 December 1995	Norwich City	H	3–2	14,251	Whitlow, Roberts, Heskey
23 December 1995	Grimsby Town	A	2–2	7,713	Roberts, Walsh
1 January 1996	Millwall	A	1–1	9,953	Corica
13 January 1996	Stoke City	A	0–1	13,669	
21 January 1996	Sunderland	H	0–0	16,130	
3 February 1996	Luton Town	H	1–1	14,821	Roberts
10 February 1996	Portsmouth	A	1–2	9,003	Roberts
17 February 1996	Port Vale	H	1–1	13,758	Taylor
21 February 1996	Wolverhampton Wanderers	A	3–2	27,381	Roberts, Heskey (2)
24 February 1996	Reading	A	1–1	9,817	Lewis
28 February 1996	Derby County	H	0–0	20,911	
3 March 1996	Ipswich Town	A	2–4	9,817	Roberts (2)
9 March 1996	Grimsby Town	H	2–1	13,784	Heskey (2)
13 March 1996	Ipswich Town	H	0–2	17,783	
16 March 1996	Oldham Athletic	A	1–3	5,582	Whitlow
23 March 1996	Millwall	H	2–1	12,543	Carey, Taylor
30 March 1996	Sheffield United	H	0–2	15,230	
2 April 1996	Charlton Athletic	A	1–0	11,287	Claridge
6 April 1996	Crystal Palace	A	1–0	17,331	Roberts
9 April 1996	West Bromwich Albion	H	1–2	17,889	Robins
13 April 1996	Tranmere Rovers	A	1–1	8,882	Robins
17 April 1996	Oldham Athletic	H	2–0	12,790	Claridge (2)
20 April 1996	Huddersfield Town	H	2–1	17,619	Walsh, Claridge
27 April 1996	Birmingham City	H	3–0	19,702	Claridge, Heskey, Lennon
5 May 1996	Watford	A	1–0	20,089	Izzet

=== First Division play-offs ===
Round	Date	Opponent	Venue	Result	Attendance	Scorers
SF 1st Leg	12 May 1996	Stoke City	H	0–0	20,323	
SF 2nd Leg	15 May 1996	Stoke City	A	1–0 (won 1–0 on agg)	21,037	Parker
F	27 May 1996	Crystal Palace	N	2–1 (a.e.t.)	73,573	Parker (pen), Claridge

=== FA Cup ===
Round	Date	Opponent	Venue	Result	Attendance	Goalscorers
R3	6 January 1996	Manchester City	H	0–0	20,640	
R3R	17 January 1996	Manchester City	A	0–5	19,980	

=== League Cup ===
Round	Date	Opponent	Venue	Result	Attendance	Goalscorers
R2 1st Leg	20 September 1995	Burnley	H	2–0	11,142	Robins, Joachim
R2 2nd Leg	3 October 1995	Burnley	A	2–0	4,553	Robins (2)
R3	24 October 1995	Bolton Wanderers	A	0–0	9,166	
R3R	8 November 1995	Bolton Wanderers	H	2–3	14,884	Robins, Roberts

== Squad ==
Note: Flags indicate national team as defined under FIFA eligibility rules; some limited exceptions apply. Players may hold more than one non-FIFA nationality.

No.	Pos.	Nation	Player
—	GK	(England) ENG	Kevin Poole
—	GK	(Australia) AUS	Željko Kalac
—	DF	(England) ENG	Simon Grayson
—	DF	(England) ENG	Colin Hill
—	DF	(England) ENG	Neil Lewis
—	DF	(England) ENG	Richard Smith
—	DF	(England) ENG	Steve Walsh
—	DF	(England) ENG	Julian Watts
—	DF	(England) ENG	Mike Whitlow
—	DF	(England) ENG	Jimmy Willis
—	DF	(Republic of Ireland) IRL	Brian Carey
—	DF	(France) FRA	Franck Rolling
—	DF	(Sweden) SWE	Pontus Kåmark
—	DF	(Jamaica) JAM	Jamie Lawrence
—	MF	(England) ENG	Mark Blake

No.	Pos.	Nation	Player
—	MF	(England) ENG	David Lowe
—	MF	(England) ENG	Sam McMahon
—	MF	(England) ENG	Garry Parker
—	MF	(England) ENG	Lee Philpott
—	MF	(England) ENG	Scott Taylor
—	MF	(Northern Ireland) NIR	Neil Lennon
—	MF	(Turkey) TUR	Muzzy Izzet
—	MF	(Australia) AUS	Steve Corica
—	FW	(England) ENG	Steve Claridge
—	FW	(England) ENG	Phil Gee
—	FW	(England) ENG	Emile Heskey
—	FW	(England) ENG	Julian Joachim
—	FW	(England) ENG	Mark Robins
—	FW	(Wales) WAL	Iwan Roberts
