= David Lowe (footballer) =

English footballer (born 1965)

Personal information
- Full name: David Anthony Lowe
- Date of birth: 30 August 1965 (age 61)
- Place of birth: Liverpool, England
- Height: 5 ft 11 in (1.80 m)
- Position: Right winger

Youth career
- 1982–1983: Wigan Athletic

Senior career*
Years	Team	Apps	(Gls)
1983–1987	Wigan Athletic	188	(40)
1987–1992	Ipswich Town	134	(37)
1992	→ Port Vale (loan)	9	(2)
1992–1996	Leicester City	94	(22)
1994	→ Port Vale (loan)	19	(5)
1996–1999	Wigan Athletic	108	(26)
1999–2000	Wrexham	10	(1)
2000	→ Rushden & Diamonds (loan)	12	(4)
Total		574	(137)

International career
1983–1984	England Youth	7	(1)
1988	England U21	2	(0)

Managerial career
- 2009: Derby County (caretaker)
- 2025: Blackburn Rovers (caretaker)
- * Club domestic league appearances and goals

David Anthony Lowe (born 30 August 1965) is an English football coach and former player and coach.

As a player, he was a right winger; he made 563 league appearances, scoring 133 goals, in a career spanning 17 years. He played in the top five levels of English football. He notably played in the Premier League with Leicester City as well as in the Football League for Wigan Athletic, Ipswich Town, Port Vale, Wrexham and Rushden & Diamonds. He was capped twice by the England under-21s.

Following retirement, he turned his hand to coaching. He initially worked for the Professional Footballers' Association before re-joining Wigan as a coach under Paul Jewell. He later spent time with Derby County and took charge of the first team for one game in January 2009. He has since worked for both Manchester United and Tranmere Rovers. He coached at Blackburn Rovers and became caretaker manager in February 2025.

== Playing career ==
=== Wigan Athletic ===
Having had brief spells with Liverpool and Everton, Lowe began his career as an apprentice at Wigan Athletic on a recommendation by a teacher from his school league days to then Wigan manager Harry McNally. He was capped at England Youth level. Lowe made his first-team début in October 1982 against Reading. At the end of the 1982–83 season, Wigan finished one point above the Third Division relegation zone. They then finished 15th in 1983–84 and 16th in 1984–85. At the end of the 1984–85 season, Lowe scored past Brentford in the Football League Trophy final at Wembley with a spectacular overhead kick to help his team win the match 3–1. Bryan Hamilton then took charge at Springfield Park for the 1985–86 season and led the club to within one place and one point of promotion. Ray Mathias then took the club to the newly created play-offs in 1986–87, where they were defeated by Swindon Town.

=== Ipswich Town ===
In June 1987, Lowe was transferred to Ipswich Town for £80,000. He won two caps for the England under-21 team whilst at Ipswich. He scored 18 goals in 1987–88 to become the club's top scorer. Manager John Duncan took Ipswich to within three points of the Second Division play-offs in 1988–89. He left the club after Ipswich finished five points outside the play-offs in 1989–90, with Lowe again finishing as the club's top scorer with 13 goals. New boss John Lyall then took over at Portman Road, and following a 14th-place finish in 1990–91, took the club to the Second Division title in 1991–92, four points ahead of Middlesbrough. Lowe missed the end-of-season run-in as he was loaned out to Port Vale in March 1992. He stayed at Vale Park for the rest of the season and scored twice in nine games as the club battled unsuccessfully to avoid exiting the Second Division at the opposite end to Ipswich.

=== Leicester City ===
In July 1992, Lowe signed for Leicester City, with manager Brian Little authorising a fee of £200,000. Lowe had scored 42 goals in 169 appearances for Ipswich Town in all competitions. In a pre-season friendly against Borussia Mönchengladbach, one of his first games for the "Foxes", he broke his cheekbone. However, he would become a regular first-team player at Filbert Street in 1992–93, bagging 12 goals to help the club book a place in the First Division play-offs. However, he did not find the net in 1993–94. He did not feature in the play-off final victory over Derby County. In February 1994, Port Vale manager John Rudge secured the out-of-favour Lowe on loan until the end of the season. This time he scored five goals in 19 appearances as he helped Port Vale to win promotion out of the Second Division in second place; this tally included a vital goal in a 2–1 win over eventual third-place club Plymouth Argyle.

When Lowe returned to Leicester, he found himself back in first-team contention. However, the new boss Mark McGhee failed to keep the club in the Premier League following a poor start under Little. On 17 September 1994, Lowe scored an overhead goal in a 3–1 win over Tottenham Hotspur, later voted as the club's goal of the season. On 25 February 1995, Lowe scored against rivals Coventry City, in a 4–2 defeat at Highfield Road. The following month, he also scored against Nottingham Forest, another of the club's major rivals, in another 4–2 defeat. He scored eight goals in 29 Premier League games in the 1994–95 season, just one behind top-scorer Iwan Roberts. He scored three goals in the 1995–96 campaign, but left the club before new boss Martin O'Neill could lead the club back to the top-flight via the play-offs.

=== Return to Wigan Athletic ===
In March 1996, he re-signed with Wigan Athletic, back in the Third Division (the old Fourth Division), who paid out a fee of £125,000. Under manager John Deehan, Wigan won the Third Division title in 1996–97, with Lowe scoring six goals in 40 games. His goal in the final game of the season secured the title, as they edged ahead of Fulham on goal difference. He then scored 16 league goals in 1997–98 to become both the club's top scorer and one of the highest scorers in the division. He was also voted the club's Player of the Season. In a surprise move, former boss Ray Mathias then returned to the club following a nine-year absence. Lowe hit three goals in 23 games in an injury-plagued 1998–99 campaign, as Wigan reached the play-offs, where they were defeated by Manchester City.

Lowe scored 83 times in all competitions during his two spells at Wigan, making him the highest goal scorer in the club's Football League history. He also held the club record for most League goals (66) until this was surpassed by Andy Liddell in 2003.

=== Wrexham ===
Released by Wigan in June 1999, Lowe made the move to Second Division rivals Wrexham on a two-year deal, where he was offered a player-coach role. He started just five games in 1999–2000, before joining Rushden & Diamonds on loan in January. He scored six goals in 16 games. He helped Diamonds to a second-place finish in the Football Conference, nine points behind champions Kidderminster Harriers.

== Style of play ==
Lowe was an intelligent, ball-playing attacker.

== Coaching career ==
After retiring as a player, Lowe worked for the Professional Footballers' Association as a coach educator in the North-West until June 2002, when he joined Wigan Athletic under former teammate Paul Jewell. A fully qualified coach, Lowe fulfilled various roles at Wigan before following Jewell to Derby County and becoming head of the youth academy at the club. Following the departure of Jewell and before the arrival of new manager Nigel Clough, Lowe was placed in temporary charge of one game in January 2009, where his Derby team beat Manchester United 1–0 in the first leg of the League Cup semi-final at Pride Park Stadium. He left the club in April 2009. He then did part-time work for Manchester United, in charge of the eldest participants in Manchester United Soccer Schools, before joining the back-room staff at Tranmere Rovers.

In June 2011, Lowe joined Blackburn Rovers as head of youth coaching. In February 2017, Lowe was appointed assistant head coach to new club manager Tony Mowbray. He signed a new two-year deal with the club four months later. He took caretaker charge on 13 February 2025 after John Eustace left to manage Derby County. He won two of his three games in charge before Valérien Ismaël was appointed as manager on 25 February. Ismaël did not retain Lowe on the coaching staff at the end of the 2024–25 season.

== Career statistics ==
=== As a player ===
Appearances and goals by club, season and competition
Club	Season	League			FA Cup		Other		Total	
Club	Season	Division	Apps	Goals	Apps	Goals	Apps	Goals	Apps	Goals
Wigan Athletic	1982–83	Third Division	28	6	0	0	1	0	29	6
Wigan Athletic	1983–84	Third Division	40	8	4	0	2	0	46	8
Wigan Athletic	1984–85	Third Division	29	5	2	0	8	4	39	9
Wigan Athletic	1985–86	Third Division	46	5	5	2	8	3	59	10
Wigan Athletic	1986–87	Third Division	45	16	5	2	7	2	57	20
Wigan Athletic	Total		188	40	16	4	26	9	230	53
Ipswich Town	1987–88	Second Division	41	17	1	0	6	2	48	19
Ipswich Town	1988–89	Second Division	32	6	0	0	7	3	39	9
Ipswich Town	1989–90	Second Division	34	13	1	0	3	0	38	13
Ipswich Town	1990–91	Second Division	13	0	1	0	2	0	16	0
Ipswich Town	1991–92	Second Division	14	1	0	0	4	3	18	4
Ipswich Town	Total		134	37	3	0	22	8	159	45
Port Vale (loan)	1991–92	Second Division	9	2	0	0	0	0	9	2
Leicester City	1992–93	First Division	32	11	2	0	3	1	37	12
Leicester City	1993–94	First Division	5	0	0	0	2	0	7	0
Leicester City	1994–95	Premier League	29	8	1	0	1	0	31	8
Leicester City	1995–96	First Division	28	3	1	0	4	0	33	3
Leicester City	Total		94	22	4	0	10	1	108	23
Port Vale (loan)	1993–94	Second Division	19	5	0	0	0	0	19	5
Wigan Athletic	1995–96	Third Division	7	3	0	0	0	0	7	3
Wigan Athletic	1996–97	Third Division	42	6	1	0	3	0	46	6
Wigan Athletic	1997–98	Second Division	43	16	3	1	5	1	51	18
Wigan Athletic	1998–99	Second Division	16	1	2	2	5	0	23	3
Wigan Athletic	Total		108	26	6	3	13	1	127	30
Wrexham	1999–2000	Second Division	10	1	0	0	1	0	11	1
Rushden & Diamonds (loan)	1999–2000	Conference	12	4	0	0	4	2	16	6
Career total			574	137	29	7	76	21	679	165

=== As a manager ===
As of match played 22 February 2025

Managerial record by team and tenure
Team	From	To	Record					Ref(s)
Team	From	To	P	W	D	L	Win %	Ref(s)
Derby County (caretaker)	6 January 2009	8 January 2009	1	1	0	0	100.00	
Blackburn Rovers (caretaker)	12 February 2025	25 February 2025	3	2	0	1	66.67	
Total			4	3	0	1	75.00	

== Honours ==
Wigan Athletic

- Football League Third Division: 1996–97
- Associate Members' Cup: 1984–85

Ipswich Town

- Football League Second Division: 1991–92

Port Vale

- Football League Second Division second-place promotion: 1993–94

Individual

- Wigan Athletic Player of the Year: 1997–98
