= Neil Lewis =

Neil Lewis may refer to:

- Sir Neil Elliott Lewis (1858–1935), Australian politician
- Neil Lewis (footballer) (born 1974), English football defender
- Neil Lewis (journalist) former journalist with the New York Times
