= Emile Heskey =

English footballer (born 1978)

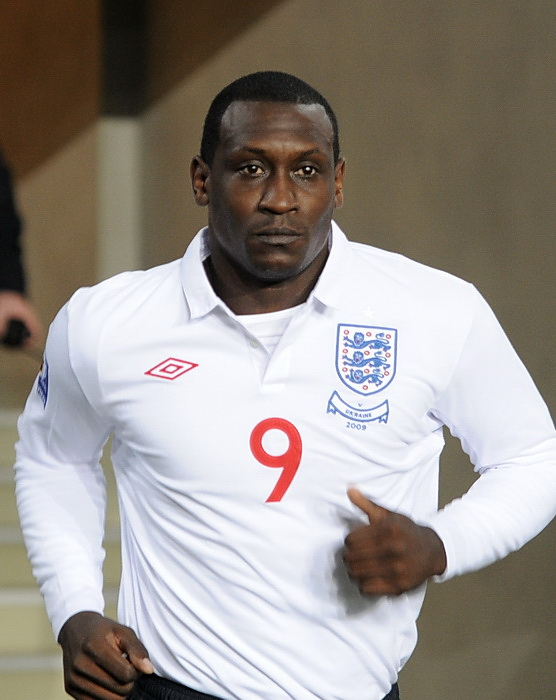
- Heskey playing for England in 2009

Personal information
- Full name: Emile William Ivanhoe Heskey
- Date of birth: 11 January 1978 (age 48)
- Place of birth: Leicester, England
- Height: 6 ft 2 in (1.88 m)
- Position: Striker

Team information
- Current team: Leicester City Women (head of football development)

Youth career
- 1987–1994: Leicester City

Senior career*
Years	Team	Apps	(Gls)
1994–2000	Leicester City	154	(40)
2000–2004	Liverpool	150	(39)
2004–2006	Birmingham City	68	(14)
2006–2009	Wigan Athletic	82	(15)
2009–2012	Aston Villa	92	(9)
2012–2014	Newcastle Jets	42	(10)
2014–2016	Bolton Wanderers	45	(3)
Total		633	(130)

International career
1994	England U16	4	(0)
1995–1996	England U18	8	(5)
1996–2000	England U21	17	(6)
1998	England B	1	(1)
1999–2010	England	62	(7)

Managerial career
- 2021: Leicester City Women (interim)
- * Club domestic league appearances and goals

Emile William Ivanhoe Heskey (born 11 January 1978) is an English professional football coach and former player who is the head of football development of Women's Super League 2 club Leicester City Women. Playing as a striker, he made more than 500 appearances in the Football League and Premier League over an 18-year career, and also had a spell in Australia, playing for the A-League club Newcastle Jets. He represented England in international football.

Born in Leicester, Heskey started his career with Leicester City after progressing through their youth system, making his first-team debut in 1995. After winning the League Cup in 1997 and 2000 he made an £11 million move to Liverpool in 2000, which, at the time, was the record transfer fee paid by the club. At Liverpool, he won multiple honours, including the FA Cup in 2001. He moved to Birmingham City in 2004 and after their relegation from the Premier League signed for Wigan Athletic for a club record £5.5 million fee in 2006. He signed for Aston Villa in 2009 and was released in 2012 before signing for the Australian club Newcastle Jets. After two years, he returned to England, finishing his career with Bolton Wanderers.

Heskey was an England international at under-16, under-18, under-21, B and senior levels. He made his England debut against Hungary in a 1–1 draw in 1999. He lost his place in the squad after UEFA Euro 2004, during which he was the subject of much criticism. Heskey was recalled to the England squad for UEFA Euro 2008 qualifiers in September 2007. In England and Liverpool, Heskey formed a successful strike partnership with Michael Owen. He retired from international football following the 2010 FIFA World Cup, having attained 62 caps and scored 7 goals for his country.

In 2021, Heskey was announced as the head of football development at Leicester City Women.

== Early life ==
Heskey was born in Leicester, Leicestershire, to a family of Antiguan descent, and his father, Tyrone Heskey, ran the security of nightclubs in Leicester. He attended City of Leicester School, Evington.

== Club career ==
=== Leicester City ===
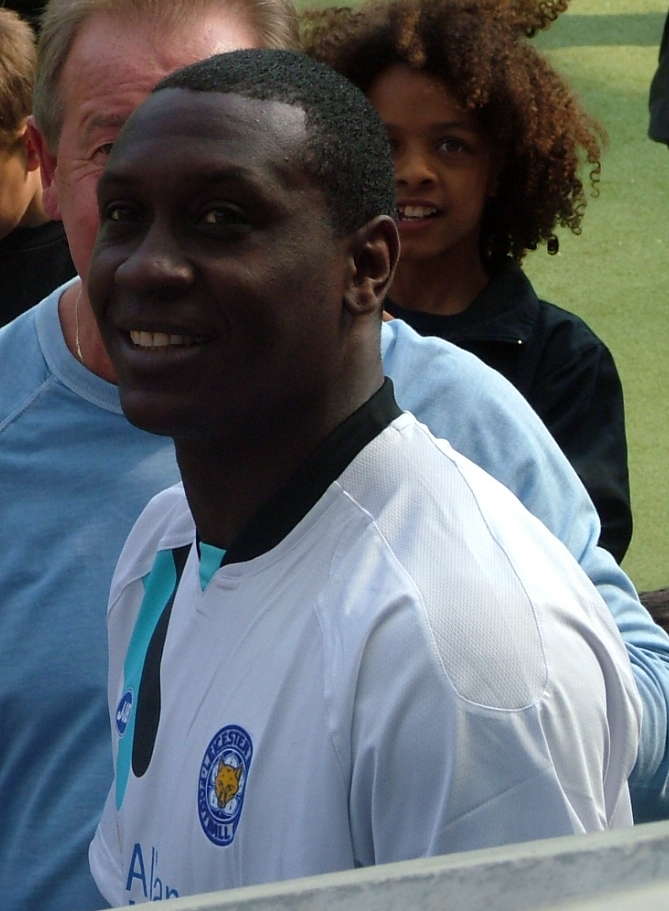
Heskey in Leicester City colours during an event at the club's ground in 2006

Heskey was a keen footballer in his childhood and played for Ratby Groby Juniors, a local youth team in Leicester. He stood out amongst his peers and at the age of nine accepted a place at Leicester City's football academy. Progressing through their youth system, he made his first-team debut at the age of 17 while still a first-year trainee in a Premier League match against Queens Park Rangers on 8 March 1995. Leicester were relegated to the First Division following the end of the 1994–95 season and he signed his first professional contract with the club on 3 October 1995. He became a first-team regular in the 1995–96 season, making 30 league appearances. During this season, Heskey scored his first goal, which came in a 1–0 victory over Norwich City, in a season he managed to score seven goals. He helped Leicester earn promotion back to the Premier League, starting in the 1996 First Division play-off final on 27 May as they beat Crystal Palace 2–1.

During the 1996–97 season, his first in the Premier League, Heskey scored 10 goals in 35 appearances, and scored the equaliser in the 1997 League Cup Final against Middlesbrough, which Leicester won in a replay. Heskey was runner-up to David Beckham for the PFA Young Player of the Year award. The following season saw interest from Leeds United and Tottenham Hotspur for Heskey, as he again scored 10 Premier League goals, making him Leicester's top scorer that season. However, the 1998–99 season saw Heskey score only six top-flight goals, and he was criticised for not scoring enough goals and going to ground too easily. During this season however, he forged an effective strike partnership with Tony Cottee, who benefited from Heskey's unselfish style of play, which manager Martin O'Neill claimed kept the club in the Premier League. Heskey started for Leicester in the 1999 League Cup Final on 21 March, in which they were beaten 1–0 by Tottenham Hotspur. He went on to win the League Cup again with a 2–1 win against Tranmere Rovers in the 2000 final on 27 February.

=== Liverpool ===
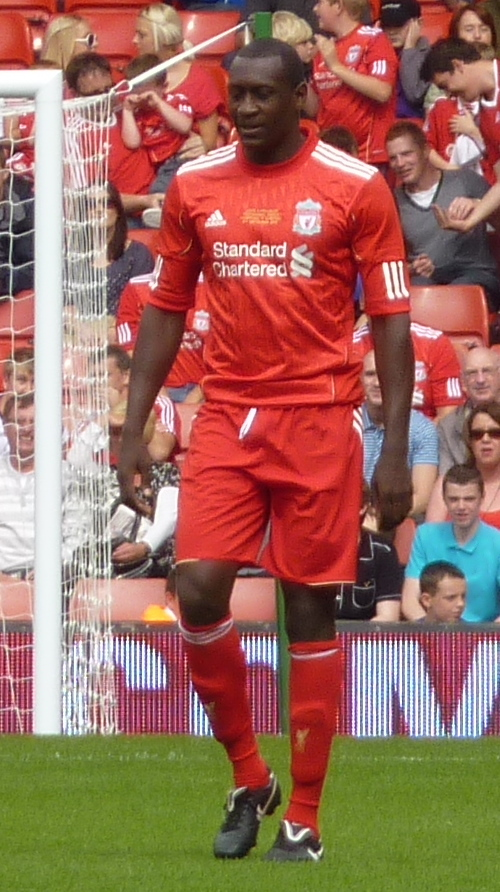
Heskey during Jamie Carragher's testimonial match in 2010

Heskey signed for Liverpool on 10 March 2000 in a long-anticipated £11 million move, which, at the time, set the record transfer fee paid by the Merseyside club. Liverpool manager Gérard Houllier looked forward to working with him, but stated that "at his age he is not the finished product". The press saw the move as expensive and risky as Heskey was relatively inexperienced and was not a prolific goalscorer. However, he was held in high regard by both the England under-21 manager, Peter Taylor, and England and Liverpool teammate Michael Owen. Veteran Liverpool striker Ian Rush approved of the signing, noting that Heskey would "give Liverpool a different dimension", bringing strength to the Liverpool strikeforce and complementing Owen and Robbie Fowler's pacey play. Heskey made his debut in a Premier League clash with Sunderland on 11 March 2000 and scored his first goal in a 3–0 victory over Coventry City on 1 April. He finished the 1999–2000 season with 12 appearances and 3 goals for Liverpool.

He started in the 2001 League Cup Final on 25 February, in which Liverpool beat Birmingham City 5–4 on penalties after a 1–1 extra-time draw. He played in the 2001 FA Cup Final on 12 May 2001, starting ahead of Fowler, which Liverpool won 2–1 against Arsenal. Four days later, Heskey started in the 2001 UEFA Cup Final, in which Liverpool beat Deportivo Alavés 5–4 after extra time. In the 2000–01 season, Heskey scored 22 goals for Liverpool as the club won the FA Cup, League Cup and UEFA Cup treble. He started for Liverpool in the 2001 FA Charity Shield on 12 August, in which they beat Manchester United 2–1. He scored Liverpool's second goal when they beat Bayern Munich 3–2 in the 2001 UEFA Super Cup on 24 August.

Heskey started for Liverpool in their 2–1 defeat to Arsenal in the 2002 FA Community Shield on 11 August 2002. He was linked with a £12 million move to Tottenham Hotspur in December 2002, but Houllier insisted he was a part of his long-term plans and he remained at Liverpool. The same year, Heskey made a six-figure donation to aid a consortium led by Gary Lineker in their bid to buy-out his former club, Leicester City, who were experiencing financial difficulties. He started in Liverpool's 2–0 win over Manchester United in the 2003 League Cup Final on 2 March. The 2002–03 season saw him score 9 goals in 51 appearances for Liverpool and received criticism for his low goal to game ratio, with Houllier claiming that his future at the club was safe.

He picked up a hamstring injury during a match against Newcastle United in January 2004, which ruled him out of action for three weeks. In the 2003–04 season, Heskey faced increasing competition from Milan Baroš for a place in the Liverpool starting line-up. He regained his place in the team after an injury ruled Baroš out for months and finished the season with 12 goals.

=== Birmingham City ===
At the end of the 2003–04 season, Heskey signed for Birmingham City on 18 May 2004 on a five-year contract for an initial £3.5 million fee, which could have risen to £6.25 million, and would thus have become Birmingham's most expensive player. He suffered an ankle injury during a pre-season friendly against CA Osasuna, which put his Premier League debut against Portsmouth in doubt. He was eventually able to play against Portsmouth on 14 August, and the match ended as a 1–1 draw. His first goal came with a header in the eighth minute against Manchester City, which was enough to earn a 1–0 victory on 24 August. At the end of that season Birmingham finished 12th in mid-table. Heskey was named as the club's Player of the Season, Player's Player of the Season, finished as top goalscorer with 11 goals and won most man of the match awards.

He suffered from an ankle injury against Blackburn Rovers on 19 April 2006, and after passing a late fitness test, played in a 0–0 draw against Everton on 22 April. Birmingham's 2005–06 season, during which Heskey scored only four goals in 34 league appearances, culminated in relegation to the Championship. During this season, Heskey gave inconsistent performances and received abuse from Birmingham fans. Birmingham managing director Karren Brady stated that Birmingham's relegation meant that the last £1.5 million of the maximum £6.25 million fee for signing Heskey from Liverpool would not be payable.

=== Wigan Athletic ===
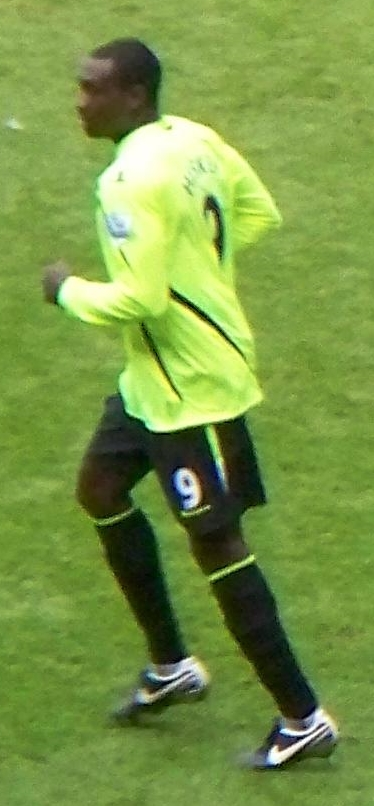
Heskey playing for Wigan Athletic in 2008

Heskey was signed by Premier League club Wigan Athletic on 7 July 2006 for a £5.5 million fee. He made his debut against Newcastle United on 19 August 2006, which his new team lost 2–1. On his 500th league appearance, Heskey scored his first goal for Wigan in a 1–0 Premier League victory over Reading on 26 August. He scored 8 goals in 36 appearances in the 2006–07 season, as Wigan avoided relegation on goal difference over Sheffield United, against whom Heskey played well on 13 May 2007, in a match he nearly scored a bicycle kick.

Heskey suffered a suspected broken metatarsal in September 2007, and made his return for Wigan in a 2–0 defeat to Arsenal in November. He picked up an ankle injury during Wigan's 5–3 victory against Blackburn in December 2007. On 14 April 2008, Heskey scored a 90th minute equalising goal against Chelsea, which damaged their hopes of winning the Premier League. He went on to score Wigan's equaliser against Tottenham Hotspur in the following match to give them a 1–1 draw, which proved to be his last goal of the 2007–08 season, which he finished with 4 goals in 30 appearances.

His first goal of the 2008–09 season came in Wigan's fourth match, a 5–0 victory against Hull City at the KC Stadium. He hinted in October 2008 that he would be interested in leaving Wigan to play in the Champions League, although Wigan manager Steve Bruce hoped to persuade him to sign a new contract at the club. Heskey commented on reports of interest from Liverpool by saying "It would be lovely. We'll see how it goes." He scored his 100th goal in the Premier League against Portsmouth on 1 November 2008, which secured a 2–1 victory for Wigan. Dave Whelan, the Wigan chairman, hinted that Heskey could be transferred by Wigan in January 2009, as a fee would be received, whereas he would move on for free in the summer, which came after he had stalled on talks over a new contract. However, Bruce said he would only accept an offer for Heskey if it was "outrageous". He later said he was confident of keeping Heskey at the club. Heskey picked up a hamstring injury during a match against Bolton Wanderers in December 2008, which resulted in him missing an FA Cup third round tie against Tottenham Hotspur. He later said he would stay at Wigan and see out his contract until the summer of 2009.

=== Aston Villa ===
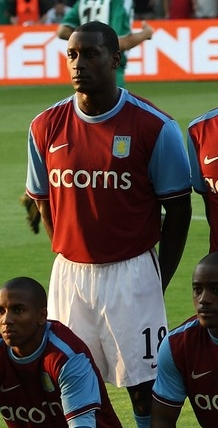
Heskey playing for Aston Villa in 2009

Heskey signed for Aston Villa on 23 January 2009 for a £3.5 million fee on a three-and-a-half-year contract. He made his debut four days later against Portsmouth and scored with a shot from 20 yards, the first time he had scored on a club debut. He scored one more goal before the end of the season, with the opening goal in a 1–1 draw with West Ham United. He finished the 2008–09 season with 14 appearances and 2 goals for Villa.

He suffered from concussion after minutes into a Peace Cup pre-season friendly match against Málaga in July 2009. Heskey was reported to have said he was considering leaving Villa during the January 2010 transfer window, to help ensure he would be chosen for the England team at the 2010 FIFA World Cup, to which manager Martin O'Neill responded by saying "There are players at this club with England ambitions. I wouldn't be overly concerned about all that yet." However, Heskey later denied he was seeking to leave Villa. O'Neill told him to "build up a head of steam" in February 2010, saying he was concerned that Heskey's injuries were denying him from producing his best form. He started for Villa in the 2010 League Cup Final, in which they lost 2–1 to Manchester United. Heskey finished the 2009–10 season with 42 appearances and 5 goals.

His first appearance of the 2010–11 season came after starting in a 1–1 draw at Rapid Vienna in the Europa League play-off first leg. Under Gérard Houllier, who previously managed Heskey at Liverpool, the striker enjoyed a successful start to the 2010–11 campaign including winning goals in the local derbies with Wolverhampton Wanderers and West Bromwich Albion.

On 7 May 2011, in Aston Villa's home match against Wigan, Heskey barged into referee Mike Jones and continued to argue with him because he did not award a free kick for an alleged elbow by Antolín Alcaraz. Heskey received a yellow card for his behaviour and had to be restrained by teammates such as Brad Friedel and captain Stiliyan Petrov. He played for the remainder of the half, but had to be restrained again in the tunnel at the interval. Caretaker manager Gary McAllister chose to substitute him for Marc Albrighton at half-time, and Heskey was not allowed to remain at the stadium for the rest of the match. Despite his outburst, Heskey received no punishment from either Villa or The Football Association. Teammate Luke Young later said that Heskey was "lucky he didn't get sent off".

Heskey remained with Villa for one more season, in which he scored just once, in an August 2011 win over Blackburn. He was released in May 2012 after being told he would not be offered a new contract.

=== Newcastle Jets ===
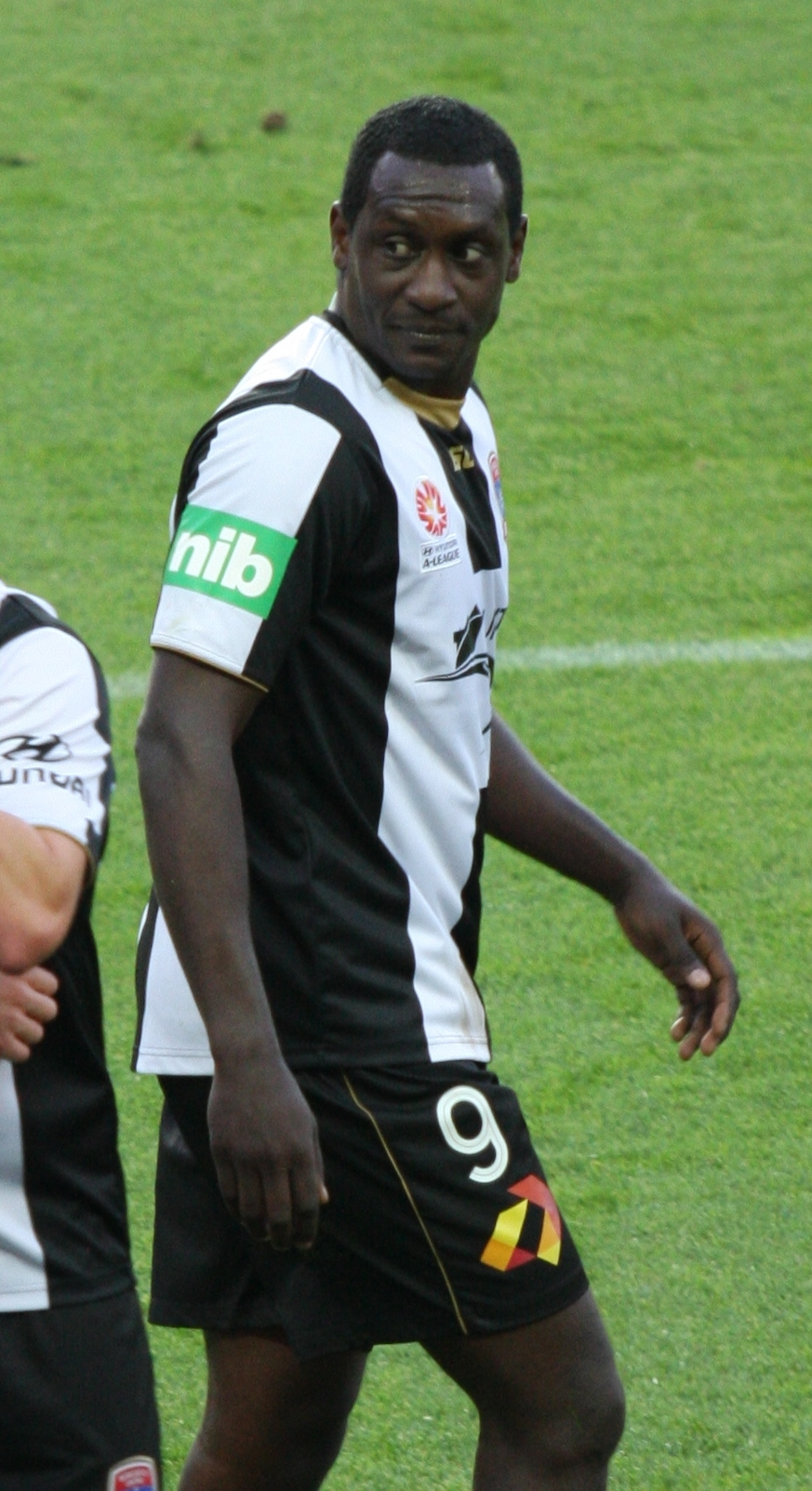
Heskey playing for Newcastle Jets in 2012

Heskey signed for Australian A-League club Newcastle Jets on 21 September 2012 as their marquee player for the 2012–13 season. He made his debut in the Jets' 2–0 home defeat to Adelaide United, in which he was substituted in the 72nd minute for James Virgili. Heskey scored his first A-League goal in a 3–2 away win against Sydney FC on 13 October 2012. In five starts, Heskey put his goal tally up to five, with his goal against Sydney FC, followed by one goal against F3 Derby rivals the Central Coast Mariners, two goals against Melbourne Victory on 26 October and one goal against the Western Sydney Wanderers, which took him to joint top scorer of the league. The match against Melbourne featured "Heskey Cam", which allowed the viewer to track Heskey's movements with one camera throughout the match. Having finished 2012–13 with 9 goals in 23 appearances and earning a nomination for the Jets' Player of the Year award, Heskey signed a new contract for the 2013–14 season in April 2013. After scoring once in 19 appearances in the 2013–14 season, Heskey left the Jets to pursue a move to an English club.

=== Bolton Wanderers ===
After a successful trial Heskey signed for Championship club Bolton Wanderers on a short-term contract on 24 December 2014. He made his debut two days later as a half-time substitute for Robert Hall with Bolton 1–0 down at home to Blackburn, but after scoring the equalising goal in the 59th minute Bolton went on to win 2–1. His goal was set up by another 36-year-old forward who the club had signed that month, Eiður Guðjohnsen. Heskey was released by Bolton when his contract expired at the end of 2015–16 season. He subsequently retired from playing.

== Post-playing career ==
Heskey joined Cheshire League One club Egerton in 2017 as a coach, alongside Jlloyd Samuel, Jim Cherneski and Dean Gorré. In May 2020 Heskey revealed that he was on a UEFA Management course and was looking to take up an internship with Leicester City's women's team as part of it. In September, he was appointed to an ambassadorial and mentoring role with Leicester City Women as they worked towards professional status, and tasked with supporting the club's head of women's football, Russ Fraser, with developing the academy. Fraser left a year later, and Heskey succeeded him as head of women's football development. Leicester Women's manager, Jonathan Morgan, was sacked on 25 November 2021 after the team began the 2021–22 FA WSL season with eight successive losses, and Heskey took over the role on an interim basis. Five days later, it was announced that Lydia Bedford would succeed Morgan as manager, but Heskey was allowed to prepare for the team's upcoming League Cup tie against Manchester United. His sole match in charge was won on penalties, following a 2–2 draw in regular time.

On 18 August 2023, Heskey was appointed as a coach supporting the England U18s ahead of the 2023 FIFA U-17 World Cup as part of The Football Association and Professional Footballers' Association's joint England Elite Coach Programme (EECP).

== International career ==
=== Youth level ===
Heskey gained his first international recognition with the England national under-16 team, making his debut on 26 April 1994 as a substitute in 1–0 win over Portugal in their opening match at the 1994 UEFA European Under-16 Championship. His first start came two days later as England drew 1–1 with the Republic of Ireland. All four of Heskey's under-16 caps came at this tournament, in which England were eliminated in the quarter-final by Ukraine, losing 7–6 on penalties after a 2–2 extra-time draw.

Heskey made his debut for under-18s on 16 November 1995 when starting against Latvia in 1996 UEFA European Under-18 Championship qualification, scoring both goals in a 2–0 win in the second and 58th minutes. He played in all four matches for the team at the 1996 UEFA European Under-18 Championship, scoring in the 18th minute of the third-place match against Belgium as England won 3–2 after extra time. He finished his under-18 career with eight appearances and five goals.

Heskey went on to gain recognition with the under-21 team, making his debut after starting in a 0–0 draw with Poland on 8 October 1996; a year later on 30 May 1997, he scored against the same team in a 1–1 stalemate. Making his final appearance on 29 March 2000 in a 3–0 victory over FR Yugoslavia in a 2000 UEFA European Under-21 Championship qualification play-off, he finished his under-21 career with 17 caps, in which he scored six goals. He was capped once by the England B team, against Chile on 10 February 1998, scoring a 90th-minute goal in a 2–1 defeat.

=== Senior level ===
Heskey was given his first call-up to the senior England team for a friendly against the Czech Republic on 18 November 1998, but did not play. He made his debut in a friendly against Hungary in Budapest in a 1–1 draw on 28 April 1999 and made his first start against Argentina at Wembley Stadium on 23 February 2000. That showing ensured he was in the England squad for UEFA Euro 2000. However, his two substitute performances in the tournament could not help England, as the team were eliminated in the group stage.

==== 2002 FIFA World Cup ====
In September 2001, Heskey scored to "make it five" in England's 5–1 win away in Germany in a qualifying match for the 2002 FIFA World Cup. This was accompanied by his DJ goal celebration, a celebration he popularised. Heskey was selected in the squad for the 2002 FIFA World Cup in South Korea and Japan, and was used as a makeshift option to play in England's left-wing role in the match against Sweden, but did not perform well out of his regular position. He scored against Denmark in England's 3–0 victory, which saw England reach the quarter-finals of the tournament. He featured in the match where England were beaten 2–1 by the eventual champions Brazil.

==== UEFA Euro 2004 ====
He and teammate Ashley Cole received abuse from some Slovakia supporters when England played them in a Euro 2004 qualifier in October 2002, which led to UEFA opening an investigation into the allegations. Slovakia were eventually forced to play their next home international behind closed doors. Heskey's place in the England squad had been placed under scrutiny in 2003 with the emergence of Wayne Rooney into the England squad. However, despite being criticised for his lack of international goals, he continued to be an integral part of the international squad and took over the captaincy from Michael Owen after he was substituted when England beat Serbia and Montenegro 2–1 in his hometown of Leicester in June 2003. Heskey was named in the England squad for UEFA Euro 2004, but failed to perform well, and was the subject of much criticism. He came on as a substitute while England were leading 1–0 against France and fouled Claude Makélélé on the edge of the penalty area, giving away a free kick from which France equalised. England eventually lost 2–1.

==== 2006 FIFA World Cup qualification ====
Heskey was recalled into the England squad for the 2006 FIFA World Cup qualifiers against Northern Ireland and Azerbaijan in 2005, after having been dropped following the match against Ukraine in August 2004. Since the emergence of Peter Crouch in the England squad, the possibility of a recall receded further.

==== UEFA Euro 2008 qualification ====
Heskey's international appearances under manager Steve McClaren were limited, although he was recalled to the England squad in September 2007 for the UEFA Euro 2008 qualifiers as cover for the injured Rooney against Israel and Russia, on the recommendation of Michael Owen, after stating that he wanted to play alongside Heskey. He started the match against Israel and played an important role in the England attack, and by featuring he became the first England player to be capped for England whilst playing for Wigan Athletic. Heskey also started the next match against Russia, fighting off competition from Peter Crouch for a place in the team, during which he created an assist for Owen's second goal. He was widely praised for his performances in the two matches, with former England international Alan Shearer commenting, "Never in a million years did I expect to be discussing whether Emile Heskey should keep his place ahead of Wayne Rooney but the Wigan striker was outstanding over both matches."

==== 2010 FIFA World Cup qualification ====
Heskey was called into manager Fabio Capello's first squad against Switzerland, but had to withdraw due to an injury. He was called into the squad for a friendly against the Czech Republic in August 2008 and came on as a 46th-minute substitute, in a match that finished 2–2. He featured in the following 2010 FIFA World Cup qualification victories against Andorra and Croatia. Heskey was alleged to have been racially abused during the match against Croatia, with monkey chants being heard from sections of the Croatia support, after which FIFA opened an investigation, and eventually fined the Croatian Football Federation £15,000 for the incident.

He played his 50th match for England in the 2010 World Cup qualifier against Belarus on 15 October 2008, after which he was credited as helping Wayne Rooney's improved form in international matches, with the two forming an effective strike partnership and keeping Owen out of the team. He started in a friendly against Spain in February 2009, which drew an angry reaction by Villa manager Martin O'Neill, who wanted to know why Capello played Heskey after suffering from an injury. Heskey scored his first goal for England in six years against Slovakia, scoring England's first in a 4–0 victory at Wembley Stadium. He picked up a hamstring injury during this match, which forced him into withdrawing from the squad. He scored in a 4–0 victory over Kazakhstan in a 2010 World Cup qualifier in June 2009, which was his first competitive goal for England in seven years.

==== 2010 FIFA World Cup ====
Heskey was named in England's preliminary 30-man squad for the 2010 World Cup on 11 May 2010 and was eventually chosen for the final 23-man squad on 1 June. Heskey injured England captain Rio Ferdinand during a training session on 4 June, which ruled Ferdinand out of the tournament. He started in England's opening match, a 1–1 draw with the United States and assisted Steven Gerrard's goal.

Heskey retired from international football on 15 July 2010, at the age of 32, having scored 7 goals in 62 appearances for England.

== Style of play ==
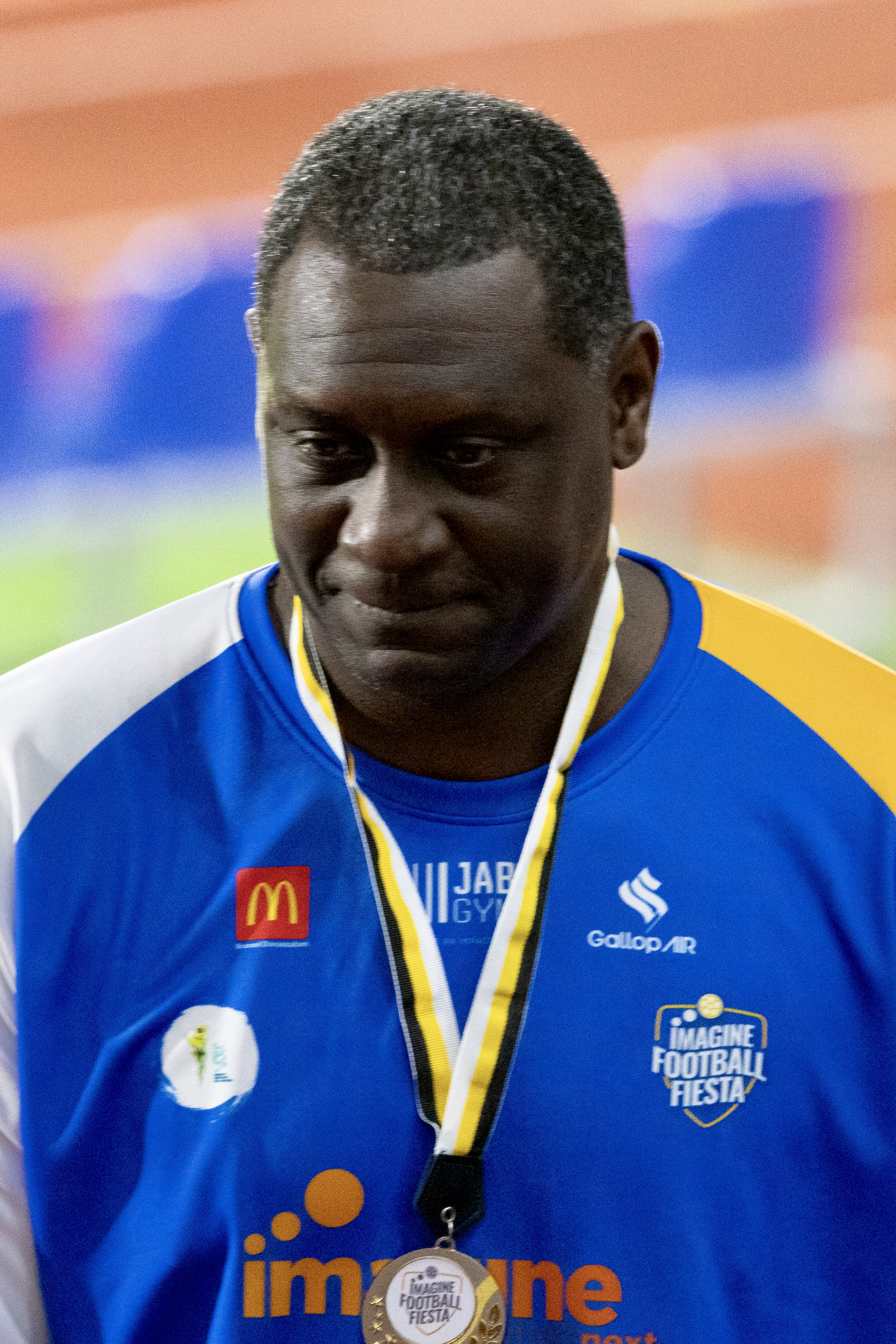
Heskey playing a friendly match in Brunei, 2024

Heskey played as a striker, being a mobile yet powerful targetman, gifted with pace, physical strength, and an ability to utilise his height to win aerial challenges; he was also an intelligent and hard working player, known for his movement and athleticism. His play was likened to "a blunt instrument with which to bludgeon defences". His main contributions to the team lay in the way he held the ball up with his back to goal and drew defenders out, leaving space behind him for another player to score. He was credited as being an unselfish player who would link-up well with other players and create space or chances for teammates, allowing other forwards to benefit. He was not a prolific goalscorer, or particularly graceful or skilful from a technical standpoint, but was able to provide a significant number of assists when deployed as a second striker in an attacking partnership alongside another striker. He was quoted as saying "Forwards are judged on their goalscoring but I like to think I bring a lot more to the game and I do get pleasure from assisting". He impressed the England staff with his versatility, as he could also play down the left wing, in addition to his usual role as an out–and–out striker; he also drew praise from managers and teammates over his selfless team-play. However, he was criticised by the media for his lack of goals and perceived poor mentality; lapses in his goalscoring were described as being "hardly uncommon". It was stated in 2008 that "It is only the perception of his talents that changes" after Heskey stated he was no better or worse than before. Although primarily a forward, he was also used in a more withdrawn role on occasion during his time with Aston Villa, functioning as an attacking midfielder, whose role was to link-up the midfield with the attack, or even as a central midfielder.

== Personal life ==
Heskey was the partner of Kylee Pinsent but left her in 2004 and married Chantelle (née Tagoe) in May 2014 at Rookery Hall, Cheshire. He started seeing Tagoe secretly in 2002, who worked part-time as a waitress at a lap-dancing bar in Liverpool, while still in a relationship with Pinsent. Following the revelation of his two-year affair with Tagoe, Pinsent broke up with Heskey. He is the father of six children, three of them with former partner Pinsent and three with Tagoe. His fiancée Tagoe was held at knifepoint at their home in Hale, Greater Manchester in July 2008, while he was at a training session. The thieves burgled the house and stole Heskey's car but neither Tagoe, nor their two (at the time) children who were in the house, were hurt. Following this, he said Tagoe was "very, very distressed" by the incident. In 2009, he was rated as owning a personal fortune of £12 million. Heskey and other members of the England team supported the Shoe Aid for Africa campaign in 2009, which was aimed at helping underprivileged children in Africa.

Heskey's sons Jaden and Reigan are youth team players for Manchester City. On 24 September 2025, Jaden and Reigan both made their professional debuts as substitutes against Huddersfield Town in the EFL Cup.

In June 2024, Heskey was ordered to pay a bill for legal fees of almost £200k following a seven-year dispute with HMRC over an unpaid tax bill.

Heskey is the second uncle of Spanish footballer Mateo Joseph.

== Career statistics ==
=== Club ===
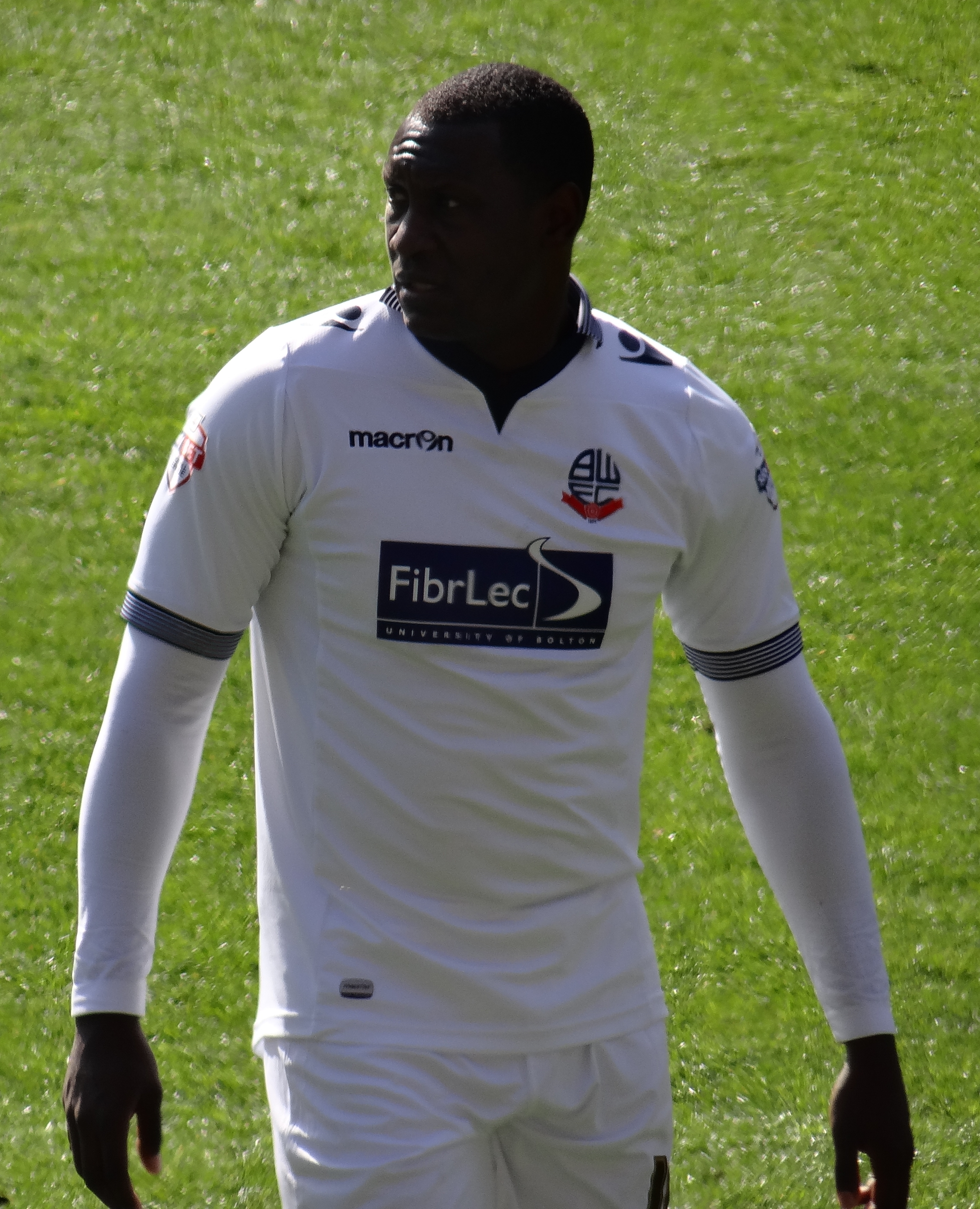
Heskey playing for Bolton Wanderers in 2015

Appearances and goals by club, season and competition
Club	Season	League			FA Cup		League Cup		Europe		Other		Total	
Club	Season	Division	Apps	Goals	Apps	Goals	Apps	Goals	Apps	Goals	Apps	Goals	Apps	Goals
Leicester City	1994–95	Premier League	1	0	0	0	0	0	—		—		1	0
Leicester City	1995–96	First Division	30	7	0	0	2	0	—		3 (Note: Appearances in First Division play-offs)	0	35	7
Leicester City	1996–97	Premier League	35	10	3	0	9	2	—		—		47	12
Leicester City	1997–98	Premier League	35	10	2	0	0	0	2 (Note: Appearances in UEFA Cup)	0	—		39	10
Leicester City	1998–99	Premier League	30	6	2	0	8	3	—		—		40	9
Leicester City	1999–2000	Premier League	23	7	4	0	8	1	—		—		35	8
Leicester City	Total		154	40	11	0	27	6	2	0	3	0	197	46
Liverpool	1999–2000	Premier League	12	3	—		—		—		—		12	3
Liverpool	2000–01	Premier League	36	14	5	5	4	0	11	3	—		56	22
Liverpool	2001–02	Premier League	35	9	2	0	1	0	17 (Note: Sixteen appearances and four goals in UEFA Champions League, one appearance and one goal in UEFA Super Cup)	5	1 (Note: Appearance in FA Charity Shield)	0	56	14
Liverpool	2002–03	Premier League	32	6	3	0	5	0	11 (Note: Six appearances and two goals in UEFA Champions League, five appearances and one goal in UEFA Cup)	3	1	0	52	9
Liverpool	2003–04	Premier League	35	7	4	1	2	2	6	2	—		47	12
Liverpool	Total		150	39	14	6	12	2	45	13	2	0	223	60
Birmingham City	2004–05	Premier League	34	10	2	1	2	0	—		—		38	11
Birmingham City	2005–06	Premier League	34	4	3	0	3	1	—		—		40	5
Birmingham City	Total		68	14	5	1	5	1	—		—		78	16
Wigan Athletic	2006–07	Premier League	34	8	1	0	1	0	—		—		36	8
Wigan Athletic	2007–08	Premier League	28	4	2	0	0	0	—		—		30	4
Wigan Athletic	2008–09	Premier League	20	3	0	0	2	0	—		—		22	3
Wigan Athletic	Total		82	15	3	0	3	0	—		—		88	15
Aston Villa	2008–09	Premier League	14	2	0	0	—		0	0	—		14	2
Aston Villa	2009–10	Premier League	31	3	4	0	5	2	2 (Note: Appearances in UEFA Europa League)	0	—		42	5
Aston Villa	2010–11	Premier League	19	3	2	0	2	2	2	1	—		25	6
Aston Villa	2011–12	Premier League	28	1	1	0	0	0	—		—		29	1
Aston Villa	Total		92	9	7	0	7	4	4	1	—		110	14
Newcastle Jets	2012–13	A-League	23	9	—		—		—		—		23	9
Newcastle Jets	2013–14	A-League	19	1	—		—		—		—		19	1
Newcastle Jets	Total		42	10	—		—		—		—		42	10
Bolton Wanderers	2014–15	Championship	16	1	2	0	—		—		—		18	1
Bolton Wanderers	2015–16	Championship	29	2	0	0	1	0	—		—		30	2
Bolton Wanderers	Total		45	3	2	0	1	0	—		—		48	3
Career total			633	130	42	7	55	13	51	14	5	0	786	164

=== International ===
Appearances and goals by national team and year
National team	Year	Apps	Goals
England	1999	4	0
England	2000	7	1
England	2001	9	2
England	2002	11	1
England	2003	7	1
England	2004	5	0
England	2007	2	0
England	2008	5	0
England	2009	7	2
England	2010	5	0
Total		62	7

England score listed first, score column indicates score after each Heskey goal.

List of international goals scored by Emile Heskey
No.	Date	Venue	Cap	Opponent	Score	Result	Competition	Ref.
1	3 June 2000	National Stadium, Ta' Qali, Malta	7	Malta	2–1	2–1	Friendly	
2	28 February 2001	Villa Park, Birmingham, England	12	Spain	2–0	3–0	Friendly	
3	1 September 2001	Olympiastadion, Munich, Germany	17	Germany	5–1	5–1	2002 FIFA World Cup qualification	
4	15 June 2002	Niigata Stadium, Niigata, Japan	28	Denmark	3–0	3–0	2002 FIFA World Cup	
5	22 May 2003	Kings Park Stadium, Durban, South Africa	33	South Africa	2–1	2–1	Friendly	
6	28 March 2009	Wembley Stadium, London, England	52	Slovakia	1–0	4–0	Friendly	
7	6 June 2009	Almaty Central Stadium, Almaty, Kazakhstan	53	Kazakhstan	2–0	4–0	2010 FIFA World Cup qualification	

== Honours ==
Leicester City

- Football League Cup: 1996–97, 1999–2000; runner-up: 1998–99
- Football League First Division play-offs: 1996

Liverpool

- FA Cup: 2000–01
- Football League Cup: 2000–01, 2002–03
- FA Charity Shield: 2001
- UEFA Cup: 2000–01
- UEFA Super Cup: 2001

Aston Villa

- Football League Cup runner-up: 2009–10

Individual

- Birmingham City Player of the Season: 2004–05
- Birmingham City Players' Player of the Season: 2004–05
