= Mark Robins =

English football manager (born 1969)

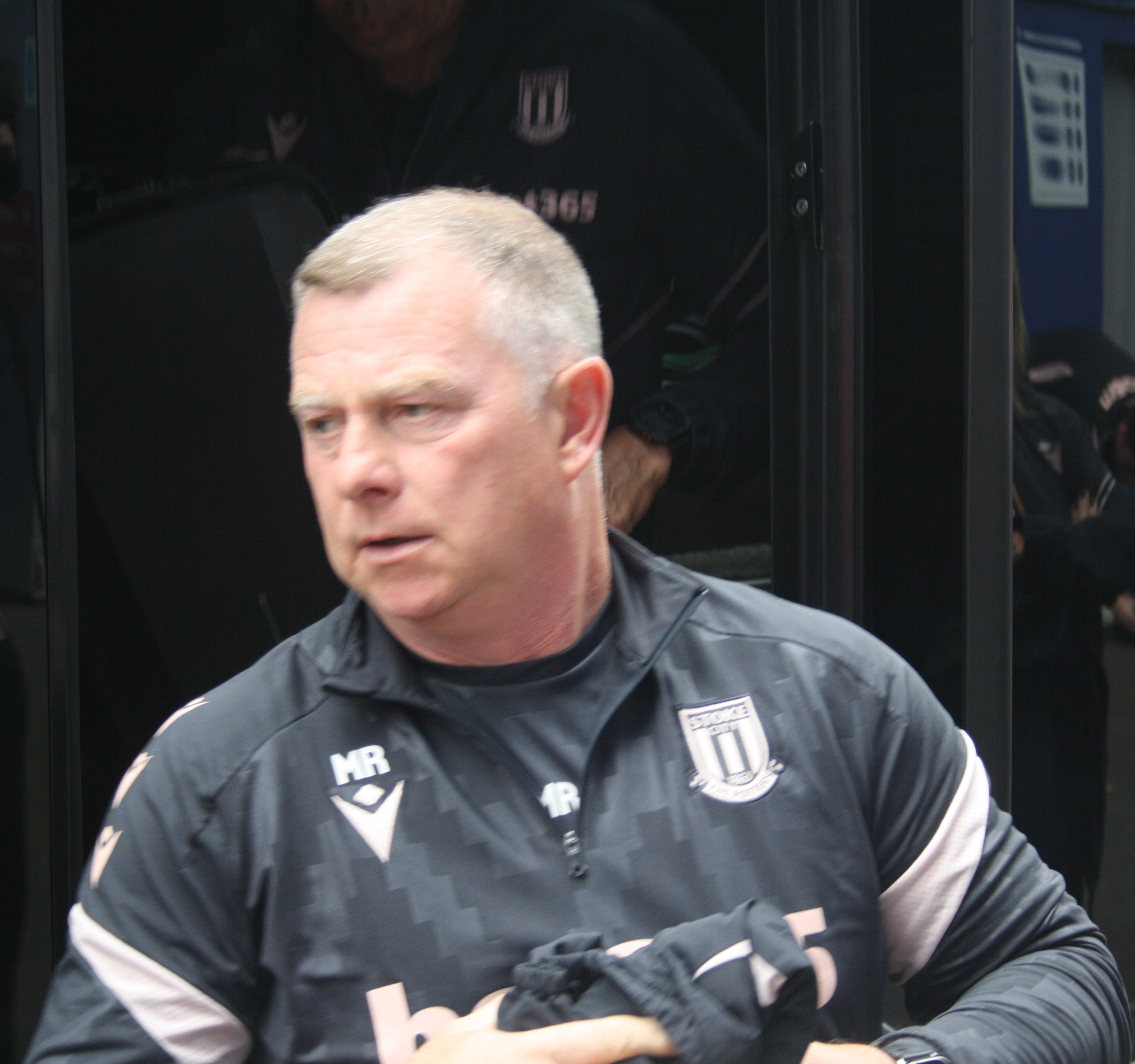
- Robins as manager of Stoke City in 2025

Personal information
- Full name: Mark Gordon Robins
- Date of birth: 22 December 1969 (age 56)
- Place of birth: Ashton-under-Lyne, Lancashire, England
- Height: 5 ft 7 in (1.70 m)
- Position: Striker

Team information
- Current team: Stoke City (manager)

Youth career
- 1984–1988: Manchester United

Senior career*
Years	Team	Apps	(Gls)
1988–1992	Manchester United	48	(11)
1992–1995	Norwich City	68	(20)
1995–1998	Leicester City	56	(12)
1996	→ Copenhagen (loan)	6	(4)
1997	→ Reading (loan)	5	(0)
1998	Ourense	18	(5)
1998–1999	Panionios	13	(1)
1999	→ Manchester City (loan)	2	(0)
1999–2000	Walsall	40	(6)
2000–2003	Rotherham United	107	(44)
2003	→ Bristol City (loan)	6	(4)
2003–2004	Sheffield Wednesday	15	(3)
2004–2005	Burton Albion	9	(1)
Total		393	(111)

International career
1985	England U16	9	(3)
1990	England U21	6	(7)

Managerial career
- 2007–2009: Rotherham United
- 2009–2011: Barnsley
- 2012–2013: Coventry City
- 2013–2014: Huddersfield Town
- 2014–2016: Scunthorpe United
- 2017–2024: Coventry City
- 2025–: Stoke City
- * Club domestic league appearances and goals

Mark Gordon Robins (born 22 December 1969) is an English football manager and former player who is the manager of EFL Championship club Stoke City. As a player, he was a striker and is best known for his time in the Premier League with Manchester United, Norwich City and Leicester City.

Robins began his career with Manchester United. During this period, he scored a goal against Nottingham Forest in a 1989–90 FA Cup tie that has subsequently been credited with "saving" manager Alex Ferguson's job at Old Trafford. After spending time with Norwich and Leicester, Robins went on to play for Reading, Manchester City, Walsall, Rotherham United, Bristol City and Sheffield Wednesday in the Football League. Robins also played across Europe during spells with Copenhagen, Ourense, and Panionios before finishing his career with Burton Albion in the Conference National.

In 2007, he became manager of Rotherham United, and joined Barnsley in the same capacity in 2009, before leaving in 2011, following differences between him and the board. In 2012, he became manager of Coventry City until 2013 when he joined Huddersfield Town. Robins left Huddersfield Town in 2014 by mutual agreement. A few months later he became manager of Scunthorpe United before leaving in 2016.

In March 2017, Robins rejoined Coventry City and a few months later won the EFL Trophy. In the 2017–18 season, Robins won the EFL League Two play-offs with the Sky Blues and were promoted to League One. After a solid eighth-placed finish in League One in the 2018–19 season, Robins led Coventry to promotion to the EFL Championship as League One Champions in the 2019–20 season. He followed that up by guiding Coventry to a respectable 16th-placed finish in the Championship in the 2020–21 season, and further improved upon this with a 12th-placed finish in the 2021–22 season. In the 2022–23 season, Robins led Coventry to a fifth-place finish in the Championship, qualifying for promotion play-offs. Coventry City met Luton Town at Wembley in the final, where they ultimately lost on penalties. In the 2023–24 season saw Robins lead Coventry to reach the semi-finals of the FA Cup for the first time since 1987, where they lost to his former club Manchester United. Robins left Coventry in November 2024 and later was appointed manager of Stoke City in January 2025.

== Club career ==
=== Manchester United ===
Robins played an important part in winning the FA Cup for Manchester United in 1990, which was the first trophy of manager Alex Ferguson's reign at the club, scoring the winning goal in the semi-final replay against Oldham Athletic. United were playing away from home against Nottingham Forest on 7 January 1990, in the FA Cup third round tie. It was widely speculated in the media (but perennially denied by then-chairman Martin Edwards) that under-pressure United manager Alex Ferguson would have been sacked had United lost and gone out of the Cup, as they were 15th in the league by this stage and had already been eliminated from the League Cup. Instead, Robins scored the winning goal from a Mark Hughes cross. That goal was a turning point in the history of the football club – Ferguson would keep his job and go on to achieve an unmatched run of success at the club over the next 23 years.

In that season, Robins scored seven First Division goals and a further two in the FA Cup, bringing his tally that season to nine in all competitions. His goal in the FA Cup third round also had the distinction of making him the player to score the first goal of the 1990s for Manchester United. He also scored one of United's two goals in the semi-final replay where they beat Oldham Athletic.

He was second only to Mark Hughes in the goalscoring charts at Old Trafford, while Hughes's regular strike-partner Brian McClair had managed a mere five league goals and it was starting to look as though Robins could displace McClair as the club's regular second striker. However, McClair recovered his goalscoring form in 1990–91, and Robins managed only 19 First Division appearances and four goals. He was, however, in the squad that won the European Cup Winners' Cup that season. September was a good month for him, as he scored twice in a 3–1 home win over Queens Park Rangers in the league and the winning goal in a visit to Luton Town.

However, the 1991–92 season was a frustrating one for Robins as he played just twice in the league, failing to score, and in total made just eight appearances in all competitions. His only goals that season came in the League Cup second round at home to Portsmouth, when he scored twice in a 3–1 win at Old Trafford. When the opportunity for a place returned in the first team arose in April as fixture congestion took its toll on an increasingly goal-shy United, who were being overhauled by Leeds United in the title race, Robins was injured and unavailable for selection.

On 19 November 1991, he collected a European Super Cup winner's medal (as an unused substitute) as United beat Red Star Belgrade in the game at Old Trafford.

Following a frustrating season, and with United looking to sign a new striker, he asked to be transfer listed.

=== Norwich City ===
He left Manchester United for Norwich City for a fee of £800,000 where he played an important role in some of the club's greatest successes, including the remarkable win in the Olympiastadion against Bayern Munich in the UEFA Cup.

In his first game, his two goals helped Norwich defeat Arsenal 4–2 at Highbury on the opening day of the first ever Premier League season. The Canaries were 2–0 down with a quarter of the game remaining before Robins scored the club's first Premier League goal in the 69th minute, followed swiftly by goals from wingers David Phillips and Ruel Fox, before Robins completed a 4–2 triumph with an 84th-minute goal. On 9 November 1992, he became the first English player to score a hat-trick and the first player to achieve that in an away game in the Premier League in a 3–2 win against Oldham Athletic.

He helped them qualify for the UEFA Cup at the end of the 1992–93 season, in which Norwich finished third in the Premier League, having led the league at several stages and featured in the title race until well into April, before his old club Manchester United finally won the title. His 1993–94 season was interrupted by a serious injury, and coincided with a slump in form for Norwich, who finished 12th, after spending most of the first half of the season in the top five.

=== Leicester City ===
In 1994–95, after falling out with Norwich manager John Deehan, he was sold to Leicester City, but was unable to prevent them from being relegated to Division One. He did, however, help them win a promotion return to the Premier League via the play-offs in 1995–96, and win the League Cup in 1996–97, when they finished ninth in the Premier League. While at Leicester, Robins was loaned out to Copenhagen and Reading.

Leicester loaned Robins to Copenhagen in 1996. He played six games for the Danish club, scoring four goals. Among the FC Copenhagen supporters, Robins and his then attacking partner Michael Manniche got the nicknames "Batmanne and Robins".

=== Ourense and Panionios ===
After leaving Leicester in January 1998, Robins had further spells abroad playing for Spanish side Ourense and Greek side Panionios. While at Panionios, he had a brief loan spell on return in England for Manchester City; however, this was disrupted by injury.

=== Later career ===
Robins returned to England when he signed for Walsall in the summer of 1999, and went on to score eight goals in 46 appearances in his one season at the club. After one season at Walsall, Robins signed for Rotherham United in the summer of 2000. Ironically, he made his debut for the club against Walsall, and scored two goals as his former side won 3–2. He went on to score 26 goals in all competitions in his first season at Rotherham, including a hat-trick in a 4–3 win over Swindon Town. In February 2003, Robins was loaned to Bristol City. He scored on his debut for the club in a Football League Trophy tie against Cambridge United. In his brief spell at Bristol City, he scored five goals in eight appearances and helped his side reach the 2003 Football League Trophy Final. However, by the time of the final, he was recalled by Rotherham and unable to take part. Bristol City went on to win the final in his absence.

After falling out of favour at Rotherham, Robins joined Sheffield Wednesday in December 2003. As he had done at Bristol City, Robins made an impressive debut for his new club in the Football League Trophy, scoring twice as Wednesday defeated Carlisle United.

Robins ended his playing career at Conference side Burton Albion, whom he joined after leaving Sheffield Wednesday in 2004. He stayed at Burton until leaving to take up an assistant manager role at Rotherham United in January 2005.

== International career ==
Robins made his debut for the England under-21s at the Toulon Tournament in May 1990. He started the opening group game against Portugal as England lost 1−0. In the next game, he scored five goals against France in the 7−3 win, then followed that up with a goal against Russia as England qualified for the final. Robins played the whole game in the final as England beat Czechoslovakia to lift the trophy. On 11 September, he scored in the friendly against Hungary as England ran out 3−1 winners at The Dell. His last appearance was in the defeat against Poland during qualifying for the 1992 UEFA European Under-21 Championship. Overall, Robins made six appearances for the U21s and scored seven goals.

== Managerial career ==
=== Rotherham United ===
Robins joined Rotherham United in June 2000 as a player and subsequently as assistant manager, under manager Alan Knill. However, by the end of February 2007, the Millers sat 13 points adrift of safety, making the threat of relegation almost inevitable. This resulted in Knill being sacked on 1 March, with Robins becoming caretaker manager. After a spell of three wins in six games while in charge as caretaker manager, and moving the club off the bottom of League One, Robins's position was made permanent on 6 April 2007.

Robins gained much praise for his first two seasons with the Millers. The first saw Rotherham consistently in the automatic promotion places until a late dip in form, and the second almost brought promotion despite a 17-point deduction imposed by the Football League. Robins also attracted several high calibre players to the Don Valley Stadium, including League 2 player of the season Nicky Law and prolific goalscorer Adam Le Fondre.

=== Barnsley ===
Robins was appointed as the new manager of Barnsley on 9 September 2009, succeeding Simon Davey. After his first game in charge, the Championship club sat at the bottom of the table looking likely candidates for relegation. By Christmas, Robins had taken them a full nine points clear of the relegation zone and on a run of eight games unbeaten. This was followed by a poor spell towards the end of the season, and Barnsley finished 18th in the table. Robins resigned from his job at the end of the 2010–11 season, because of differences with the board.

=== Coventry City ===
On 19 September 2012, Robins was appointed as the new manager of Coventry City, signing a three-year deal. His first game was a 2–1 home defeat against Carlisle United at the Ricoh Arena.

Robins became a fan-favourite catapulting them up the league from relegation battlers to play-off contenders in the short time that he had been at the club.

Robins took the club to the Area Final of the Football League Trophy which left the club two games away from Wembley. Coventry City also had to face two Premier League clubs away from home during his time. The first being Arsenal in the League Cup third round, which resulted in a 6–1 defeat and the second being Arsenal's North London rivals Tottenham Hotspur which ended as a 3–0 loss, knocking the Sky Blues out of the FA Cup third round.

Robins was first linked with the vacant managerial positions at Doncaster Rovers and Blackpool. On 12 February 2013, Coventry City released a statement saying they had allowed Robins to go into talks with Huddersfield Town about their vacant managerial position.

=== Huddersfield Town ===
On 14 February 2013, Robins was unveiled as the new manager of Huddersfield Town on a rolling contract. His first game in charge came three days later, a 4–1 defeat to Wigan Athletic in the FA Cup fifth-round at John Smith's Stadium. On 19 February 2013, Robins took charge of his first league match as Huddersfield manager, a 6–1 defeat away from home against Nottingham Forest. Robins earned his first win as Huddersfield manager on 26 February 2013, a 1–0 victory against Burnley at Turf Moor. Huddersfield avoided relegation to League One on the final day of the 2012–13 season after drawing 2–2 with Barnsley.

After surviving the following season, Robins and Huddersfield mutually agreed to part company after the first game of the 2014–15 season, a 4–0 home defeat to Bournemouth.

=== Scunthorpe United ===
On 13 October 2014, Robins was appointed manager of League One club Scunthorpe United. After a run of two wins in eight games, Robins was sacked by Scunthorpe on 18 January 2016, leaving the club six points above the League One relegation zone.

=== Return to Coventry City ===
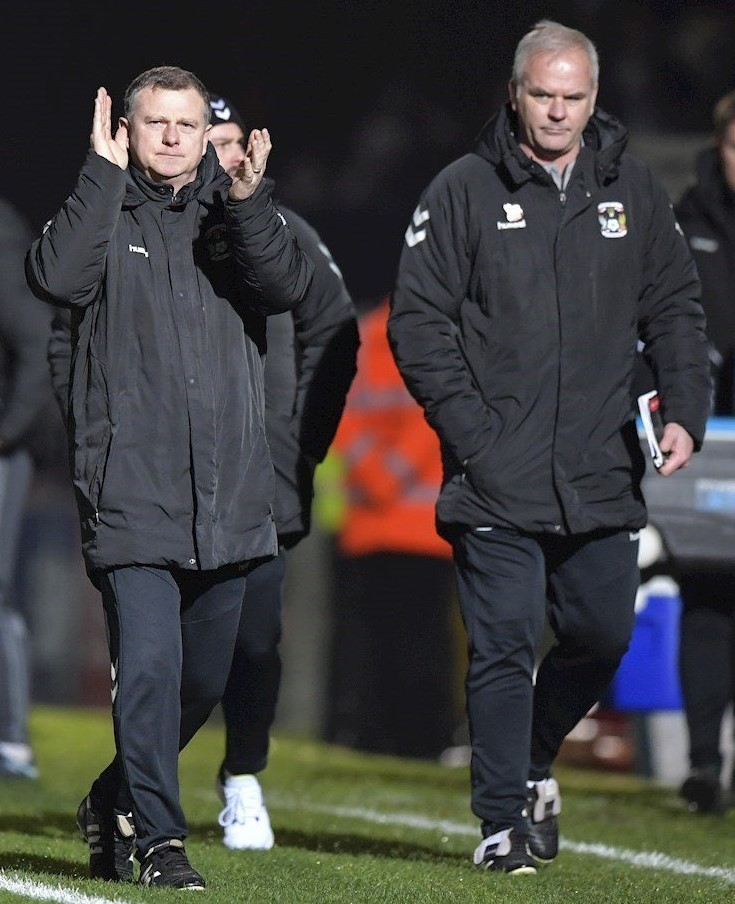
Robins (left) as manager of Coventry City in 2020 with assistant manager Adi Viveash.

On 6 March 2017, Coventry City re-appointed Robins as manager with immediate effect, the day after the sacking of previous manager Russell Slade.

On 2 April 2017, Robins led Coventry to a 2–1 victory over Oxford United in the EFL Trophy final at Wembley. Robins won his first promotion as a manager after leading Coventry to a sixth-place finish in League Two, and winning the play-offs at Wembley. Over the course of the 2017–18 season, Robins broke numerous records as Coventry City manager, including the club's first top six finish in 48 years, their first promotion in 51 years and their most points in a season. Robins's achievements gained much plaudits from local press and fans alike, when considering Coventry City had only moved down the Football League since relegation from the Premier League in 2001. The win in the League Two play-off final represented Coventry's third competitive win at Wembley and Robins' second trophy in just over a year.

After an eighth-place finish in the 2018–19 season, Robins signed a new contract with the club in October 2019. In the 2019–20 season, Robins took Coventry to the Championship after winning the league, with just three defeats all season and unbeaten since 14 December 2019. On 8 May 2021, Robins guided Coventry City to beat Millwall 6–1 to secure a 16th-place finish, in the club's first season return in the Championship in nine years. The following season, Robins guided the Sky Blues to a 12th-place finish in the Championship, their highest league placing in over ten years.

Robins signed a new deal with the club in May 2022. Robins said he was "delighted" to have signed a new deal. The 2022–23 season under Robins' stewardship saw further improvement, having guided Coventry to a fifth-placed finish, which secured them a place in the Championship play-offs. Coventry were ultimately unsuccessful in their bid for promotion to the Premier League, narrowly losing the penalty shootout in the final at Wembley against Luton Town, after playing out a 1–1 draw following extra time. On 17 May 2023, Robins agreed to a four-year contract to remain at Coventry until 2027. In the 2023–24 season, Coventry reached the semi-finals of the FA Cup for the first time since 1987, losing to Manchester United on penalties. Coventry had initially fought back from 3–0 down to level the match in stoppage time before losing on penalty kicks. On 7 November 2024, after a slow start to the 2024–25 season, Coventry announced they had dismissed Robins. At the time, Robins was the longest serving manager in the Championship.

=== Stoke City ===
Robins was appointed manager of Stoke City on 1 January 2025 on a three-and-a-half year contract, with Paul Nevin and James Rowberry as his assistants. His first match in charge was a goalless draw with Plymouth Argyle on 4 January 2025. Stoke were involved in a relegation battle in 2024–25, staying up on the final day of the season. After a good start to the 2025–26 season, Robins and his coaching staff signed new contracts in November 2025. However by December an injury crisis began to take hold and results and performances dropped off. In the second half of the season Stoke fell out of play-off contention and back into a more familiar mid-table position. Robins grew more frustrated with his players towards the end of the season and vowed to "move people on who are mercenary, don't want to train and don't want to work hard".

== Personal life ==
In 2024, Robins was awarded an honorary doctorate from Coventry University for his impact on both Coventry City Football Club and the city of Coventry itself.

== Playing statistics ==
Appearances and goals by club, season and competition
Club	Season	League			National cup		League cup		Continental		Other		Total	
Club	Season	Division	Apps	Goals	Apps	Goals	Apps	Goals	Apps	Goals	Apps	Goals	Apps	Goals
Manchester United	1988–89	First Division	10	0	1	0	1	0	—		—		12	0
Manchester United	1989–90	First Division	17	7	6	3	0	0	—		—		23	10
Manchester United	1990–91	First Division	19	4	3	2	3	0	3 (Note: Appearances in European Cup Winners' Cup)	1	1 (Note: Appearance in 1990 FA Charity Shield)	0	29	7
Manchester United	1991–92	First Division	2	0	0	0	3	2	3	0	0	0	8	2
Manchester United	Total		48	11	10	5	7	2	6	1	1	0	72	19
Norwich City	1992–93	Premier League	37	15	0	0	0	0	—		—		37	15
Norwich City	1993–94	Premier League	14	1	0	0	0	0	2 (Note: Appearances in UEFA Cup)	0	—		16	1
Norwich City	1994–95	Premier League	17	4	0	0	3	0	—		—		20	4
Norwich City	Total		68	20	0	0	3	0	2	0	—		73	20
Leicester City	1994–95	Premier League	17	5	2	0	0	0	—		—		19	5
Leicester City	1995–96	First Division	31	6	2	0	3	4	—		2 (Note: Appearances in First Division play-offs)	0	38	10
Leicester City	1996–97	Premier League	8	1	2	0	6	1	—		—		16	2
Leicester City	1997–98	Premier League	0	0	0	0	0	0	0	0	—		0	0
Leicester City	Total		56	12	6	0	9	5	0	0	2	0	73	17
Copenhagen (loan)	1996–97	Danish Superliga	6	4	2	0	0	0	—		—		8	4
Reading (loan)	1997–98	First Division	5	0	0	0	0	0	—		—		5	0
Ourense	1997–98	Segunda División	18	5	0	0	0	0	—		—		18	5
Panionios	1998–99	Alpha Ethniki	13	1	0	0	0	0	—		—		13	1
Manchester City (loan)	1998–99	Second Division	2	0	0	0	0	0	—		0	0	2	0
Walsall	1999–2000	First Division	40	6	2	1	4	1	—		—		46	8
Rotherham United	2000–01	Second Division	42	24	3	0	2	1	—		1 (Note: Appearances in Football League Trophy)	1	48	26
Rotherham United	2001–02	First Division	41	15	0	0	2	1	—		—		43	16
Rotherham United	2002–03	First Division	15	5	1	0	3	2	—		—		19	7
Rotherham United	2003–04	First Division	9	0	0	0	1	0	—		—		10	0
Rotherham United	Total		107	44	4	0	8	4	0	0	1	1	120	49
Bristol City (loan)	2002–03	Second Division	6	4	0	0	0	0	—		2	1	8	5
Sheffield Wednesday	2003–04	Second Division	15	3	0	0	0	0	—		3	4	18	7
Burton Albion	2004–05	Football Conference	9	1	0	0	0	0	—		1 (Note: Appearance in FA Trophy)	0	10	1
Career total			393	111	24	6	31	12	8	1	10	6	466	136

== Managerial statistics ==
As of match played 21 November 2026

Managerial record by team and tenure
Team	From	To	Record					Ref.
Team	From	To	P	W	D	L	Win %	Ref.
Rotherham United	1 March 2007	9 September 2009	129	56	30	43	43.4	
Barnsley	9 September 2009	15 May 2011	92	29	25	38	31.5	
Coventry City	19 September 2012	14 February 2013	33	17	6	10	51.5	
Huddersfield Town	14 February 2013	10 August 2014	68	23	14	31	33.8	
Scunthorpe United	13 October 2014	17 January 2016	71	23	23	25	32.4	
Coventry City	7 March 2017	7 November 2024	387	154	106	127	39.8	
Stoke City	1 January 2025 (Note: Robins was appointed by Stoke City on 1 January 2025 before the team's 0–0 draw with Burnley later the same day. Soccerbase erroneously include the match, which was taken by interim manager Ryan Shawcross, in their managerial statistics for Robins.)	Present	91	34	22	35	37.4	
Total			870	336	226	308	38.6	

== Honours ==
=== As a player ===
Manchester United

- FA Cup: 1989–90
- FA Charity Shield: 1990
- European Cup Winners' Cup: 1990–91
- European Super Cup: 1991

Leicester City

- Football League First Division play-offs: 1996
- Football League Cup: 1996–97

Individual

- Denzil Haroun Young Player of the Year: 1988–89
- Denzil Haroun Reserve Team Player of the Year: 1989–90

=== As a manager ===
Coventry City

- EFL League One: 2019–20
- EFL League Two play-offs: 2018
- EFL Trophy: 2016–17

Individual

- Football League Two Manager of the Month: November 2007, August 2008
- Football / EFL League One Manager of the Month: December 2012, October 2015, October 2018, February 2020
