= Kevin Sharp (footballer) =

English footballer

Personal information
- Full name: Kevin Philip Sharp
- Date of birth: 19 September 1974 (age 52)
- Place of birth: Sarnia, Ontario, Canada
- Position: Defender

Youth career
- 1991–1992: AJ Auxerre

Senior career*
Years	Team	Apps	(Gls)
1992–1995	Leeds United	17	(0)
1995–2001	Wigan Athletic	178	(10)
2001–2002	Wrexham	15	(0)
2002–2003	Huddersfield Town	39	(0)
2003–2005	Scunthorpe United	46	(2)
2005–2006	Shrewsbury Town	30	(1)
2006	Guiseley	6	(0)
2006–2007	Hamilton Academical	8	(0)
2007–2008	Northwich Victoria	7	(0)
2009	Harrogate Town	?	(?)
Total		346+	(13+)

International career
1992–1993	England U18	8	(0)
- * Club domestic league appearances and goals

Kevin Philip Sharp (born 19 September 1974) is a former footballer. Born in Canada, he represented England at youth level.

== Career ==
He began his career as at French club AJ Auxerre, but left in 1992 for England, where he spent the vast majority of his career. His first English club was Leeds United, joining for £60,000. He made just 17 league appearances in three years at the Yorkshire club, then one of the top clubs in England.

Moving to Wigan Athletic in November 1995 for a £100,000 fee, he made 216 appearances in six years. Wigan won promotion to Division Two in 1997. Whilst at Wigan he also played in the final as they won the 1998–99 Football League Trophy.

In November 2001 he joined Wrexham on a free transfer. He played just 15 times for the Welsh club, and Wrexham were relegated from Division Two that season. In August 2002, Sharp left for Huddersfield Town on another free transfer. Sharp played regularly, but again his club were relegated from Division Two. Yet again moving to a Division 2 club on a free transfer this time to Scunthorpe United.

A season in the newly renamed fourth tier of English football, Football League Two, ended in promotion for Scunthorpe, but Sharp was to stay in the division. He had made 46 league appearances - exactly half of Scunthorpe's league matches over the two years with the club. Sharp joined Shrewsbury prior to the 2005-06 season, with manager Gary Peters installed him as club captain. However, in early 2006, loss of form resulted in Shrewsbury fans turning against him, and Peters was forced to drop him from the team at the end of February 2006. Playing on only two further occasions in the following six weeks, he was released.

Sharp joined Hamilton Academical, in the Scottish Football League First Division, on an amateur basis in November 2006. He made his debut against Livingston in December 2006. Kevin was released by the club at the end of January 2007 due to the return of other experienced players in his position.

== International career ==
He represented England at youth level. Sharp was part of the victorious England team at the 1993 UEFA European Under-18 Championship beating Turkey 1–0 in the final. He played regularly at left back.

== Coaching career ==
He then joined Northwich Victoria, where he was a player-coach. In June 2009 Sharp was appointed as player/assistant manager at Harrogate Town of the Conference North - a position he no longer holds.

== Football agent ==
Sharp is now a licensed football agent, with his clients including Leeds United midfielder Kalvin Phillips.

== Career statistics ==
Kevin Sharp at the English National Football Archive (subscription required)

Club	Season	League			FA Cup		League Cup		Other		Total	
Club	Season	Division	Apps	Goals	Apps	Goals	Apps	Goals	Apps	Goals	Apps	Goals
Leeds United	1992–93	Premier League	4	0	0	0	0	0	0	0	4	0
Leeds United	1993–94	Premier League	10	0	0	0	0	0	—		10	0
Leeds United	1994–95	Premier League	2	0	0	0	0	0	—		2	0
Leeds United	1995–96	Premier League	1	0	—		0	0	1 (Note: Appearance in UEFA Cup)	0	2	0
Leeds United	Total		17	0	0	0	0	0	1	0	18	0
Wigan Athletic	1995–96	Division Three	20	6	1	0	—		—		21	6
Wigan Athletic	1996–97	Division Three	35	2	1	0	1	0	1 (Note: Appearances in Football League Trophy)	0	38	2
Wigan Athletic	1997–98	Division Two	38	0	2	0	2	0	2	0	44	0
Wigan Athletic	1998–99	Division Two	31	2	1	0	1	0	8 (Note: Six appearances one goal in Football League Trophy, two appearances in Division Two play-offs)	1	41	3
Wigan Athletic	1999–2000	Division Two	21	0	4	0	1	0	5 (Note: Three appearances in Division Two play-offs, two appearances in Football League Trophy)	0	31	0
Wigan Athletic	2000–01	Division Two	31	0	1	0	3	1	2 (Note: Appearances in Division Two play-offs)	0	37	1
Wigan Athletic	2001–02	Division Two	2	0	—		1	0	1	0	4	0
Wigan Athletic	Total		178	10	10	0	9	1	19	1	216	12
Wrexham	2001–02	Division Two	15	0	0	0	—		—		15	0
Huddersfield Town	2002–03	Division Two	39	0	1	0	2	0	1	0	43	0
Scunthorpe United	2003–04	Division Three	40	2	5	0	2	0	4	0	51	2
Scunthorpe United	2004–05	League Two	6	0	1	0	0	0	0	0	7	0
Scunthorpe United	Total		46	2	6	0	2	0	4	0	58	2
Shrewsbury Town	2005–06	League Two	30	1	0	0	2	0	0	0	32	1
Guiseley	2006–07	Northern Premier League Premier Division	6	0	1	0	—		3 (Note: Two appearances in FA Trophy, one appearance in Northern Premier League Challenge Cup)	0	10	0
Career total			331	13	18	0	15	1	28	1	392	15

== Honours ==
Wigan Athletic

- Football League Third Division: 1996–97
- Football League Trophy: 1998–99
