= Pat McGibbon =

Northern Irish footballer and manager

Personal information
- Full name: Patrick Colm McGibbon
- Date of birth: 6 September 1973 (age 53)
- Place of birth: Lurgan, County Armagh, Northern Ireland
- Position: Centre-back

Youth career
- ?–1991: Portadown

Senior career*
Years	Team	Apps	(Gls)
1991–1992	Portadown		
1992–1997	Manchester United	0	(0)
1996	→ Swansea City (loan)	1	(0)
1997	→ Wigan Athletic (loan)	10	(1)
1997–2002	Wigan Athletic	163	(11)
2002	→ Scunthorpe United (loan)	6	(0)
2002	Tranmere Rovers	4	(0)
2002–2004	Portadown		
2004–2006	Glentoran		
Total		183	(12)

International career
1994	Northern Ireland U21	1	(0)
1994–1999	Northern Ireland B	5	(0)
1995–2000	Northern Ireland	7	(0)

Managerial career
- 2006–2009: Lurgan Celtic
- 2009–2011: Monaghan United (assistant)
- 2011–2012: Newry City
- 2016: Portadown
- * Club domestic league appearances and goals

Patrick Colm McGibbon (born 6 September 1973) is a Northern Irish football manager and former professional footballer.

As a player, he was a centre-back. He notably played in the Premier League for Manchester United, he made one appearance in the League Cup during a five-year stay. He also played in the Football League for Swansea City, Wigan Athletic, Scunthorpe United and Tranmere Rovers, as well as in his native country for Portadown and Glentoran. He was capped seven times by Northern Ireland.

Following retirement, McGibbon moved into management and has had spells in charge of Lurgan Celtic, Newry City and Portadown.

== Club career ==
Born in Lurgan, County Armagh, McGibbon began his career at his local Irish Premier League club, Portadown, signing a professional contract with them in 1991, aged just 18. A year later, he was signed by Manchester United for £100,000. He made his debut for the Red Devils in a League Cup tie against York City in September 1995; United lost the match 3–0 and McGibbon was sent off.

He was loaned out to Swansea City and Wigan Athletic during the 1996–97 season. McGibbon impressed in his only appearance for the Swans, before injury struck. He trained some days with Manchester United during his time at Swansea and was injured in training, spending five months on the sidelines, requiring two operations.

McGibbon made ten appearances for the Latics during a successful loan spell at Springfield Park, and even scored the goal that guaranteed Wigan's promotion to Division Two. Wigan signed McGibbon on a permanent deal in the summer of 1997, paying Manchester United £250,000 for the defender's services (a fee which would eventually rise to £380,000). He was offered a two-year contract extension by United but opted to leave Old Trafford saying he wanted regular, competitive football.

In his five years at Wigan, McGibbon made over 150 appearances and scored 11 goals for the Latics. He also played in the final as Wigan won the 1998–99 Football League Trophy. However, he was granted a transfer request in 2001, and began to fall out of favour with manager Paul Jewell towards the end of his tenure at the Lancashire club. In February 2002, he was loaned out to Scunthorpe United for two months with a view to a permanent deal. However, McGibbon could not agree personal terms with Scunthorpe, and he returned to Wigan. Nevertheless, he was released that summer, and was soon picked up by Tranmere Rovers, managed by McGibbon's former boss at Wigan, Ray Mathias.

However, McGibbon only stayed at Tranmere for a month, and moved back to Portadown in September 2002. Two years later, he signed for Glentoran and picked up an Irish Premier League winner's medal in his first season there. McGibbon did not complete a second season at The Oval, as he retired from professional football to go back to his physiotherapy business in Portadown in March 2003. Injury was originally cited as the reason for McGibbon's retirement, but after he went on record with major criticisms of the Glentoran board, it became apparent that there were deeper reasons for his departure.

== International career ==
McGibbon won seven caps for the senior Northern Ireland team between 1995 and 2000. He also made five appearances for the Northern Ireland B team.

== Managerial career ==
Has previous post was as manager of Newry City, from March 2011 until his resignation in July 2012. He had previously been assistant manager at Monaghan United and manager of his hometown team Lurgan Celtic.

He last managed Portadown, following the resignation of Ronnie McFall after 29 years.

== Honours ==
Wigan Athletic

- Football League Trophy: 1998–99
