= Scott Taylor (footballer, born 1970) =

English footballer

Personal information
- Full name: Scott Dean Taylor
- Date of birth: 23 November 1970 (age 55)
- Place of birth: Portsmouth, England
- Height: 1.75 m (5 ft 9 in)
- Position: Winger

Youth career
- Reading

Senior career*
Years	Team	Apps	(Gls)
1989–1995	Reading	207	(33)
1995–1999	Leicester City	64	(6)
1999–2001	Wolverhampton Wanderers	32	(3)
2002	Hayes	?	(?)
- * Club domestic league appearances and goals

Scott Dean Taylor (born 23 November 1970 in Portsmouth, England) is a retired professional footballer who most notably played for Reading.

Taylor started his career as a trainee with Reading, going on to make over 200 first team appearances for the club. While at Reading, he was part of the team that narrowly missed out on promotion to the Premier League in the 1994–95 season, losing 4–3 after extra time in the playoff final against Bolton Wanderers.

Following Reading's playoff defeat, Taylor refused a new contract, and was sold to Leicester City, aiding them in their promotion to the Premier League. He also played as Leicester were victorious in the 1997 Football League Cup Final. After an injury-blighted 1997–98 season, he moved on a free transfer to Wolverhampton Wanderers. However, injuries took their toll, so Taylor retired from professional football to play non-league football for and Hayes, before fully retiring in 2002.

== Honours ==
Reading

- Football League Second Division: 1993–94

Leicester City

- Football League First Division play-offs: 1996
- Football League Cup: 1996–97
