= Simon Haworth =

Welsh footballer and manager

Personal information
- Full name: Simon Owen Haworth
- Date of birth: 30 March 1977 (age 49)
- Place of birth: Cardiff, Wales
- Position: Striker

Youth career
- Cardiff City

Senior career*
Years	Team	Apps	(Gls)
1995–1997	Cardiff City	35	(8)
1997–1998	Coventry City	11	(0)
1998–2002	Wigan Athletic	117	(44)
2002–2005	Tranmere Rovers	79	(31)
Total		242	(83)

International career
	Wales U21	12	
	Wales B	1	
1997–1998	Wales	5	(0)

Managerial career
- 2013–2014: Eagley
- 2016–2018: Clitheroe
- 2018–2022: Stalybridge Celtic
- * Club domestic league appearances and goals

Simon Owen Haworth (born 30 March 1977) is a Welsh former footballer who played as a striker. He won five caps for the Wales national football team during his career. He was since moved into football club management.

== Club career ==
Born in Cardiff, Haworth began his career at Cardiff City on a Youth Training Scheme and broke into the first team due to an injury crisis during the 1995–1996 season. He fully established himself the following year which led to him nearly signing for Norwich City only for the move to break down at the last minute. But after he earned his first cap for Wales he moved to Coventry City for £500,000, a record fee received for a player by Cardiff at the time, but struggled to find form for the club, scoring just once against Everton in the League Cup, and subsequently moved to Wigan Athletic for £750,000, a record signing for the club at the time.

He managed to show his ability for Wigan and helped them to win the Football League Trophy in the 1998–99 season. He was the first Wigan player to score at their new JJB Stadium (doing so in a game against Scunthorpe United) and also one of the last Wigan players to score at the 'old' Wembley Stadium before it was demolished in 2000 - a memorable goal against Gillingham in the Division 2 Play-off final. Eventually leaving the club in February 2002 he joined Tranmere Rovers, linking up with former strike partner Stuart Barlow again. During the 2003–04 season he suffered a double fracture in his right leg which ruled him out for around eight months. He attempted a comeback in November 2004 but was in considerable pain due to his leg not being fully healed. He decided to call an end to his football career to concentrate on his business ventures.

== International career ==
Haworth made his debut for Wales on 27 May 1997 coming on as a substitute for goalscorer John Hartson in a 1–0 victory over Scotland. He went on to earn four more caps for Wales, against Brazil, Jamaica, Malta, and Tunisia. He was also called up for a friendly against Argentina in February 2002, however he stayed on the bench. Haworth was also called up to the Wales squad in May 2003 to play United States but withdrew through injury.

== Management career ==
On 12 June 2014, Shrewsbury Town confirmed Haworth had joined the club's coaching staff.

=== Clitheroe ===
On 29 April 2016, he was appointed as the manager of Clitheroe.

=== Stalybridge Celtic ===
In May 2018 he moved to Stalybridge Celtic staying at the club until May 2022.

== Honours ==
Wigan Athletic

- Football League Trophy: 1998–99
