= Lee Ellison =

English footballer

Anthony Lee Ellison
Personal information
- Date of birth: 13 January 1973 (age 53)
- Place of birth: Bishop Auckland, England
- Position: Forward

Senior career*
Years	Team	Apps	(Gls)
1990–1994	Darlington	72	(17)
1992	→ Hartlepool United (loan)	4	(1)
1994–1995	Leicester City	0	(0)
1995–1996	Crewe Alexandra	4	(2)
1996–1997	Hereford United	1	(0)
1997–1998	Darlington	8	(3)
- Southport
Total		375	(800)
- * Club domestic league appearances and goals

Lee Ellison (born 13 January 1973) is an English former footballer who played in the Football League for Darlington - scored 10 goals in 10 games for Darlington in the old third division. Awarded Barclays Young Eagle of the Month by Jack Charlton when playing at Darlington. Also played at Hartlepool United, Leicester City, Crewe Alexandra, West Auckland, Barrow in Furness and Hereford United.

== Honours ==
Darlington

- Football League Fourth Division: 1990–91
