= Paul Rogers (footballer) =

English footballer (born 1965)

Personal information
- Full name: Paul Anthony Rogers
- Date of birth: 21 March 1965 (age 61)
- Place of birth: Portsmouth, England
- Height: 6 ft 0 in (1.83 m)
- Position: Midfielder

Senior career*
Years	Team	Apps	(Gls)
1986–1992	Sutton United	190	(14)
1992–1995	Sheffield United	126	(11)
1995–1997	Notts County	22	(2)
1996–1997	→ Wigan Athletic (loan)	9	(3)
1997–1999	Wigan Athletic	91	(2)
1999–2003	Brighton & Hove Albion	118	(15)
2003–2008	Worthing		
- * Club domestic league appearances and goals

Paul Anthony Rogers (born 21 March 1965) is an English former footballer who played as a midfielder.

== Career ==
He started his career at non-league club Sutton United, and was part of the team that defeated Coventry City in the third round of the 1988–89 FA Cup.

In January 1992, he joined Sheffield United, who were in the First Division at the time, for a fee of £35,000. At the time he was a London-based Commodities Broker. His debut was for Sheffield United Reserves against Liverpool Reserves in a Ponting League match at Bramall Lane on 21 January 1992. He went on to make over 120 league appearances for the club before moving to Notts County in 1995. However, he soon moved again to Wigan Athletic in 1997 following a successful loan spell. He made 100 league appearances for the club, and scored the winning goal for Wigan in the final of the Associate Members' Cup in 1999.

Rogers went on play at Brighton for four years before announcing his retirement from professional football in 2003. He joined Isthmian League side Worthing as a player-coach, where he stayed until finally bringing an end to his playing career in 2008.

In 2009, he joined Burgess Hill Town as a club coach.

He is currently Brighton's head of commercial services.

== Honours ==
Wigan Athletic

- Football League Third Division: 1996–97
- Football League Trophy: 1998–99

Brighton & Hove Albion

- Football League Second Division: 2001–02
- Football League Third Division: 2000–01

== See also ==
- Sutton United 2–1 Coventry City (1989)
