= Carl Bradshaw (footballer) =

English footballer

Personal information
- Full name: Carl Bradshaw
- Date of birth: 2 October 1968 (age 58)
- Place of birth: Sheffield, England
- Height: 1.78 m (5 ft 10 in)
- Position: Right back

Senior career*
Years	Team	Apps	(Gls)
1986–1988	Sheffield Wednesday	32	(4)
1986	→ Barnsley (loan)	6	(1)
1988–1989	Manchester City	5	(0)
1989–1994	Sheffield United	147	(8)
1994–1997	Norwich City	65	(2)
1997–2001	Wigan Athletic	121	(12)
2001–2002	Scunthorpe United	21	(1)
2002–2005	Alfreton Town	38	(1)
Total		435	(29)

International career
1984	England U17	2	(0)
1986	England Youth	3	(0)
- * Club domestic league appearances and goals

Carl Bradshaw (born 2 October 1968) is an English former professional footballer who played as a right back.

He notably played in the Premier League for Sheffield United and Norwich City, having previously featured in the top flight for Sheffield Wednesday and Manchester City. He also played in the Football League with Barnsley, Wigan Athletic and Scunthorpe United, before finishing his career in non-league with Alfreton Town.

== Playing career ==
Bradshaw's first club was Sheffield Wednesday. However, his first senior appearance came in a loan spell at Barnsley. He joined Manchester City in September 1988, in a swap with Imre Varadi. His Manchester City debut came in October 1988, as a substitute against West Bromwich Albion. He started the following match, against Sunderland, but this proved to be his only start for the club. In a year at Manchester City he made a total of seven appearances. He then transferred to Sheffield United in September 1989.

In September 1997, Bradshaw served a short prison sentence after an incident involving himself and Norwich teammate Andy Johnson that resulted in Bradshaw assaulting a taxi driver. His contract with Norwich was subsequently cancelled after being released from prison, and he signed with Wigan Athletic. Whilst at Wigan he played in the final as they won the 1998–99 Football League Trophy.

== Personal life ==
Since retirement, Bradshaw has worked as a bricklayer.

== Honours ==
Wigan Athletic

- Football League Trophy: 1998–99
