= 1998–99 Football League Trophy =

Auto Windscreens Shields

Tournament details
- Country: England; Wales
- Teams: 48

Final positions
- Champions: Wigan Athletic
- Runners-up: Millwall

Tournament statistics
- Matches played: 49

The Football League Trophy 1998–99, known as the Auto Windscreens Shield 1998–99 for sponsorship reasons, was the 18th staging of the Football League Trophy, a knock-out competition for English football clubs in Second and Third Division. The winners were Wigan Athletic who beat Millwall 1–0 in the final.

The competition began on 5 December 1998 and ended with the final on 18 April 1999 at the Wembley Stadium.

In the first round, there were two sections: North and South. In the following rounds each section gradually eliminates teams in knock-out fashion until each has a winning finalist. At this point, the two winning finalists face each other in the combined final to determine the winners of the Football League Trophy.

== First round ==
Carlisle United, Chesterfield, Halifax Town, Lincoln City, Rochdale, Scarborough, Scunthorpe United and York City from the North section all received byes.

Brighton & Hove Albion, Cambridge United, Exeter City, Fulham, Luton Town, Northampton Town, Southend United and Torquay United from the South section all received byes.

=== Northern Section ===
Date	Home team	Score	Away team
8 December	Blackpool	0–2	Stoke City
8 December	Burnley	0–1	Preston North End
8 December	Macclesfield Town	0–1	Wrexham
8 December	Chester City	1–2	Hartlepool United
8 December	Manchester City	1–2	Mansfield Town
8 December	Oldham Athletic	0–1	Darlington
8 December	Rotherham United	0–3	Wigan Athletic
22 December	Notts County	0–1	Hull City

=== Southern Section ===
Date	Home team	Score	Away team
5 December	Colchester United	1–5	Gillingham
8 December	AFC Bournemouth	2–0	Reading
8 December	Brentford	2–0	Plymouth Argyle
8 December	Peterborough United	3–0	Leyton Orient
8 December	Shrewbury Town	0–1	Wycombe Wanderers
8 December	Swansea City	4–1	Barnet
8 December	Walsall	2–2	Bristol Rovers
Walsall won 5 – 4 on penalties
9 December	Millwall	2–0	Cardiff City

== Second round ==
=== Northern Section ===
Date	Home team	Score	Away team
5 January	Halifax Town	4–2	York City
5 January	Hull City	1–2	Wrexham
5 January	Lincoln City	1–0	Mansfield Town
12 January	Chesterfield	2-1	Darlington
19 January	Hartlepool United	2–2	Preston North End
Hartlepool United won 4 – 3 on penalties
19 January	Scunthorpe United	1–1	Carlisle United
Carlisle United won 4 – 3 on penalties
19 January	Wigan Athletic	3–0	Scarborough
2 February	Stoke City F.C.	1-2	Rochdale

=== Southern Section ===
Date	Home team	Score	Away team
5 January	AFC Bournemouth	5–1	Peterborough United
5 January	Brighton & Hove Albion	1–5	Millwall
5 January	Cambridge United	3–2	Northampton Town
5 January	Exeter City	3–1	Southend United
5 January	Luton Town	0–3	Walsall
5 January	Swansea City	0–1	Gillingham
5 January	Torquay United	2–1	Fulham
5 January	Wycombe Wanderers	1–4	Brentford

== Quarter-finals ==
=== Northern Section ===
Date	Home team	Score	Away team
19 January	Wrexham	3–2	Chesterfield
26 January	Carlisle United	0–3	Wigan Athletic
26 January	Hartlepool United	0–3	Lincoln City
23 February	Halifax Town	1-2	Rochdale

=== Southern Section ===
Date	Home team	Score	Away team
19 January	Brentford	0–0	Walsall
Walsall won 4 – 3 on penalties
19 January	Cambridge United	1–1	Exeter City
Cambridge United won 5 – 3 on penalties
23 January	Torquay United	0–1	Gillingham
2 February	AFC Bournemouth	1–1	Millwall
Millwall won 4 – 3 on penalties

== Area semi-finals ==
=== Northern Section ===
Date	Home team	Score	Away team
16 February	Lincoln City	1–2	Wrexham
8 March	Rochdale	0–2	Wigan Athletic

=== Southern Section ===
Date	Home team	Score	Away team
16 February	Millwall	1–0	Gillingham
16 February	Walsall	1–1	Cambridge United
Walsall won 4 – 3 on penalties

== Area finals ==
=== Northern Area final ===
16 March 1999
19:45

Wigan Athletic	2–0	Wrexham
Sharp 59'; Barlow 71'

Springfield Park, Wigan
Attendance: 4,938
23 March 1999
19:45

Wrexham	2–3	Wigan Athletic
Brammer 37'; Edwards 59'; Ridler (red card)		Haworth 2' 52'; O'Neill 88'

Racecourse Ground, Wrexham
Attendance: 4,941

Wigan Athletic beat Wrexham 5–2 on aggregate.

=== Southern Area final ===
9 March 1999
19:45

Millwall	1–0	Walsall
Cahill 4'	Report

The Den, London
Attendance: 11,626
16 March 1999
19:45

Walsall	1–1	Millwall
Eyjólfsson 88'		Sadlier 37'

Bescot Stadium, West Midlands
Attendance: 9,158

Millwall beat Walsall 2–1 on aggregate.

== Final ==
18 April 1999
14:00 BST

Millwall	0–1	Wigan Athletic
	Report	Rogers 90+3'

Wembley, London
Attendance: 55,349
Referee: C.R.Wilkes

Millwall	Wigan Athletic

MILLWALL:
GK	Ben Roberts
DF	Gerard Lavin	Yellow card
DF	Jamie Stuart
DF	Stuart Nethercott
DF	Joe Dolan
MF	Tim Cahill
MF	Paul Ifill
MF	Ricky Newman	Yellow card
MF	Steven Reid
FW	Neil Harris
FW	Richard Sadlier
Substitutes:
MF	Paul Shaw
MF	Bobby Bowry
MF	Marc Bircham
Manager:
Keith Stevens

WIGAN ATHLETIC:
GK	Roy Carroll
DF	Carl Bradshaw (c)	Yellow card
DF	Pat McGibbon	Yellow card
DF	Stuart Balmer
DF	Kevin Sharp
MF	Colin Greenall
MF	Paul Rogers
MF	Michael O'Neill	Yellow card
FW	Andy Liddell
FW	Simon Haworth
FW	Stuart Barlow	(substituted off) 88'
Substitute:
DF	Scott Green
MF	David Lee	(substituted on) 88'
FW	Graeme Jones
Manager:
Ray Mathias

MATCH RULES

- 90 minutes.
- 30 minutes of extra-time if necessary.
- Penalty shoot-out if scores still level.
- Maximum of 3 substitutions.
