= Colin Greenall =

English footballer

Personal information
- Full name: Colin Anthony Greenall
- Date of birth: 30 December 1963 (age 62)
- Place of birth: Billinge Higher End, Wigan, England
- Height: 5 ft 10 in (1.78 m)
- Position: Defender

Senior career*
Years	Team	Apps	(Gls)
1980–1986	Blackpool	183	(9)
1986–1988	Gillingham	62	(4)
1988–1990	Oxford United	67	(2)
1990–1992	Bury	71	(5)
1992–1993	Preston North End	29	(1)
1993–1994	Chester City	42	(1)
1994–1995	Lincoln City	43	(3)
1995–1999	Wigan Athletic	162	(14)
Total		659	(39)

International career
1981	England U20	5	(0)

Managerial career
- 2001: Wigan Athletic (caretaker)
- * Club domestic league appearances and goals

Colin Anthony Greenall (born 30 December 1963) is an English former professional footballer who made over 600 Football League appearances between 1980 and 1999. Starting his career at Blackpool as an apprentice, Greenall had spells at Gillingham, Oxford United, Bury, Preston North End, Chester City and Lincoln City before finishing his career at his hometown club, Wigan Athletic.

== Playing career ==
=== Blackpool ===
Billinge-born Greenall made his professional debut with Blackpool on 23 September 1980, at the age of 16 years and 237 days, becoming the club's then-youngest-ever league player (a record broken by Trevor Sinclair in 1989). Three days later, he appeared in a League Cup game against Everton at Goodison Park.

Greenall was one of a host of young players brought to Blackpool by Alan Ball during his short managerial reign at the club. Unlike most of the others, however, he remained at the club for years and developed into a dependable defender. He eventually took over the central role, combining with captain Steve Hetzke and Mike Conroy to form a successful defensive partnership.

Greenall won England Youth honours and, at 20, was voted the Fourth Division's Player of the Year by the PFA.

=== Gillingham ===
After 183 league appearances in just over five years, Greenall had a contractual dispute with Blackpool, and in September 1986 he moved to Third Division Gillingham for £40,000.

=== Oxford United ===
Greenall joined Oxford United in February 1988 for £235,000, and the U's soon made him skipper following the departure of Tommy Caton, as he enjoyed a brief taste of top-flight football before they were relegated at the end of the season.

=== Bury and Preston North End ===
In July 1990, he moved to Bury for £100,000 after an initial loan spell at Gigg Lane, before departing for Preston North End during 1991–92 – a move in his favour as Preston narrowly beat the drop from Division Three while Bury were relegated. Preston would follow suit 12 months later, however.

=== Latter years ===
After a year at Chester City, where he won promotion and player of the season in 1993–94, and a spell with Lincoln City, Greenall joined Wigan Athletic in 1995. At Wigan, he helped guide the team to Third Division success as an ever-present captain in 1997. After coming out of retirement, Greenall made his Wembley debut in 1999 when he defied his advancing years to help Wigan beat Millwall 1–0 to win the Football League Trophy.

As of 2021, Greenall summarises for football commentaries on BBC Radio Lancashire.

== Coaching career ==
In 2001, Greenall became caretaker manager of Wigan for six games, losing only once, but he did not get the job permanently and lost his coaching job at Wigan shortly afterwards. He returned to playing with Rossendale United while searching for new coaching opportunities.

In June 2002 he was appointed Head of Youth Development at Rochdale and in June 2004 Director of the Centre of Excellence at Rochdale. In August 2005 he was appointed to the role of Coach Education Manager at the Lancashire FA.

== Honours ==
Wigan Athletic

- Football League Third Division: 1996–97
- Football League Trophy: 1998–99

Individual

- PFA Team of the Year: 1980–81 Fourth Division, 1986–87 Third Division
- Chester City Player of the Year: 1993–94
