= Neil Lewis (footballer) =

English footballer

Personal information
- Full name: Neil Anthony Lewis
- Date of birth: 28 June 1974 (age 52)
- Place of birth: Wolverhampton, England
- Position: Full back

Senior career*
Years	Team	Apps	(Gls)
1992–1997	Leicester City	67	(1)
1997–1998	Peterborough United	34	(0)
2001–2002	Ibstock Welfare		
- * Club domestic league appearances and goals

Neil Lewis (born 28 June 1974) is an English former professional footballer who played as a defender.

He notably played in the Premier League for Leicester City and later in the Football League for Peterborough United. Between 2001 and 2002 he played semi-professionally for Ibstock Welfare.
