= Stuart Barlow =

English footballer (born 1968)

Personal information
- Full name: Stuart Barlow
- Date of birth: 16 July 1968 (age 58)
- Place of birth: Liverpool, England
- Height: 5 ft 10 in (1.78 m)
- Position: Forward

Senior career*
Years	Team	Apps	(Gls)
1989–1990	Sherwood Park	?	(?)
1990–1995	Everton	71	(10)
1992	→ Rotherham United (loan)	0	(0)
1995–1998	Oldham Athletic	93	(31)
1998–2000	Wigan Athletic	84	(40)
2000–2003	Tranmere Rovers	94	(19)
2003–2005	Stockport County	61	(11)
2005–2006	Bury	13	(0)
2006	Morecambe	16	(5)
2006	Southport	0	(0)
2006–2007	Fleetwood Town	?	(?)
2007	→ Bamber Bridge (loan)	?	(?)
2007–2009	Bamber Bridge	?	(?)
Total		432	(116)
- * Club domestic league appearances and goals

Stuart Barlow (born 16 July 1968) is an English football coach and former professional player.

He was a midfielder and forward from 1989 until 2009. He played in the Premier League for Everton and was part of the squad that won the 1994–95 FA Cup. He also played in the Football League for Rotherham United, Oldham Athletic, Wigan Athletic, Tranmere Rovers, Stockport County and Bury before ending his career in non-league football with Morecambe, Southport, Fleetwood Town and Bamber Bridge.

Following retirement, Barlow worked away from the sport for a while before being appointed assistant manager of Northern Premier League side Colwyn Bay in 2011.

== Playing career ==
Barlow came into professional football at a late age; he was only playing at Sunday League level when he was 21 years old. He joined Everton in 1990 and went on to feature in the Premier League. In 1995 the club won the FA Cup, although Barlow was not in the side that defeated Manchester United 1–0 in the final at Wembley Stadium, he did appear in earlier rounds including starting the quarter-final versus Newcastle United. He was injured for the semi-final.

Barlow gained a reputation as a pacy striker who would willingly chase lost causes. However, his inability to find the net regularly – despite his pace often putting him through on goal – led to his gaining, amongst the Goodison support, the affectionate nickname of Stuart "Barndoor" Barlow (from the proverbial saying that an inaccurate person kicking or hitting a projectile "couldn't hit a barn door"). Another nickname was "Jigsaw" – the joke being that "he went to pieces in the box".

A few months later he was recruited to Oldham Athletic for £350,000 by ex-Everton striker and then-Athletic manager Graeme Sharp. At the time he arrived, the Latics were struggling in the First Division. Barlow spent nearly three seasons at the club and scored 32 goals in 93 games, but was sold to Wigan Athletic in 1998 for £45,000 by Neil Warnock. Whilst at Wigan he played in the final as they won the 1998–99 Football League Trophy.

He joined Tranmere Rovers in July 2000 and is best remembered by the club's supporters for scoring a winning goal in an FA Cup fifth round replay win against Premier League club Southampton in the 2000–01 season. With then second tier Tranmere trailing 3–0 at half time, Paul Rideout scored a hat-trick to level the scores before Barlow scored the winner to put Tranmere through to the last eight. After spells with Stockport County and Bury, he joined Conference National side Morecambe in 2006 and later went on to Southport and Fleetwood Town. Whilst with Fleetwood he was loaned out to Bamber Bridge where he eventually joined permanently.

In 2010, a Merseyside derby charity game was held between former players of Everton and Liverpool at Goodison Park. Barlow scored the only goal in a 1–0 win for Everton.

== Coaching career ==
In November 2011 Barlow became the assistant manager of Northern Premier League club Colwyn Bay.

== Personal life ==
Barlow retired in 2009 despite being offered a fresh contract by Bamber Bridge. He stated his decision was so that he could support and watch his young son play football for his club Formby Juniors, which Barlow ended up coaching. As well as this, he also helped a friend in his scaffolding business and assisted his wife to open her own bridal shop.

== Honours ==
Wigan Athletic

- Football League Trophy: 1998–99
