= Ray Mathias =

English football player and manager (born 1946)

Personal information
- Date of birth: 13 December 1946 (age 79)
- Place of birth: Liverpool, England
- Position: Full back

Senior career*
Years	Team	Apps	(Gls)
1964–1985	Tranmere Rovers	567	(6)

Managerial career
- 1986–1989: Wigan Athletic
- 1998–1999: Wigan Athletic
- 2001: Tranmere Rovers (caretaker)
- 2002–2003: Tranmere Rovers
- 2004: Chester City (caretaker)
- 2011: Stockport County
- * Club domestic league appearances and goals

Raymond Mathias (born 13 December 1946) is an English football coach and former player. He has spent most of his career in the lower leagues of English football. Mathias played for Tranmere Rovers between 1964 and 1985, and remains their record appearance holder having played 637 games for the club. After his retirement he spent three years as manager of Wigan Athletic, briefly returning to the role for the 1998–99 season; between these two spells he returned to Tranmere as a coach, and later managed the side before moving on to Chester City in a caretaker role.

He was appointed interim manager of Stockport County on 9 March 2011 until the end of the season, when County were relegated from the Football League for the first time in 106 years. Owing in part to an impressive home record, Mathias was appointed full-time County manager in May 2011, but departed just two weeks later following the takeover of the club by Tony Evans.

== Playing career ==
Born in Liverpool, Mathias spent his entire playing career with Tranmere Rovers from 1964 to 1985 and earning two testimonials in the process, making 567 Football League appearances. A notable achievement was winning promotion from the Fourth Division in the 1975–76 season. He made 637 appearances for Tranmere in all competitions, a club record.

== Coaching career ==
After retiring from playing, Mathias joined the coaching staff at Wigan Athletic and spent three years in charge of the Latics from 1986 to 1989. The highlight of this spell was leading Wigan to the FA Cup quarter-finals in 1987. He later returned to Tranmere as a coach but then returned to Wigan as manager for the 1998–99 season; despite leading the club to victory in the Football League Trophy final at Wembley and the Second Division play-offs he lost his job shortly afterwards.

After once again becoming part of the managerial set-up at Tranmere and spells as caretaker manager, he was finally handed the reins on a permanent basis in 2002 but sacked a year later. Mathias then had an unsuccessful caretaker spell at Chester City in 2004 and briefly worked as assistant manager at Bury in 2005. In October 2006 he was appointed as assistant manager to Paul Ince at League Two strugglers Macclesfield Town. The pair were able to guide the Silkmen to an unlikely survival before moving to Milton Keynes Dons where they achieved more success, winning the League Two championship and the Football League Trophy. They subsequently moved on to top-flight team Blackburn Rovers in June 2008.

On 18 December 2008, Mathias was relieved of his duties along with Archie Knox following the sacking of Paul Ince and the subsequent arrival of Sam Allardyce as the new Rovers manager. On 4 February 2011 he joined Stockport County as Technical Advisor to Peter Ward and Alan Lord.

Mathias was appointed manager of Stockport County on 9 March 2011 until the end of the season, with Peter Ward and Alan Lord stepping back to coaching roles. Mathias then became the first manager in Stockport County history to relegate the club from the Football League. He was dismissed as manager in favour of Dietmar Hamann on 5 July 2011, and subsequently left the club.

== Honours ==
=== As a manager ===
Wigan Athletic

- Football League Trophy: 1998–99

== See also ==
- List of one-club men
