= List of association football skills =

Notable football skills

The following is a list of individual skills in association football.

== Kicking ==
Kicking is a skill in which a player strikes the ball with their foot.

=== Basic ===
Push kick, instep kick, outside kick, toe kick, chip.

=== Advanced ===
Volley, Bicycle kick, Spin kick, Rabona, Rainbow kick, Scorpion kick.

=== Goalkeeper ===
Drop kick, punt.

== Dribbling ==
Dribbling is running with the ball at the feet and playing it on every step or every other step. It means controlling and keeping possession of the ball while running, and is often used to refer to act of attempting to get past an opposition player.

=== Advanced ===
Cruyff turn, Flip flap, Marseille turn, Runaround move, Seal dribble, Step over.

== Heading ==
Heading is the striking of a ball in the air by a player's head.

=== Advanced ===
Diving header

== Passing ==
Passing is the kicking the ball to a teammate.

=== Basic ===
Cross, push pass, short pass, long pass, back pass, one-touch, through pass, wall pass.

=== Advanced ===
Backheel pass, reverse pass

== Shooting ==
Shooting is an attempt to score a goal.

=== Advanced ===
Panenka

== Tackling ==
Tackling is an attempt by a player to take the ball away from a ball carrier by placing the player's leg in front of the ball.

=== Advanced ===
Slide tackle

== Tricks ==
Dummy, Keepie uppie, Nutmeg

== See also ==
- Association football positions
- Association football tactics
- Formation (association football)
- Football club (association football)
- Glossary of association football terms
- History of tactics in association football
