= History of tactics in association football =

Chronology of development

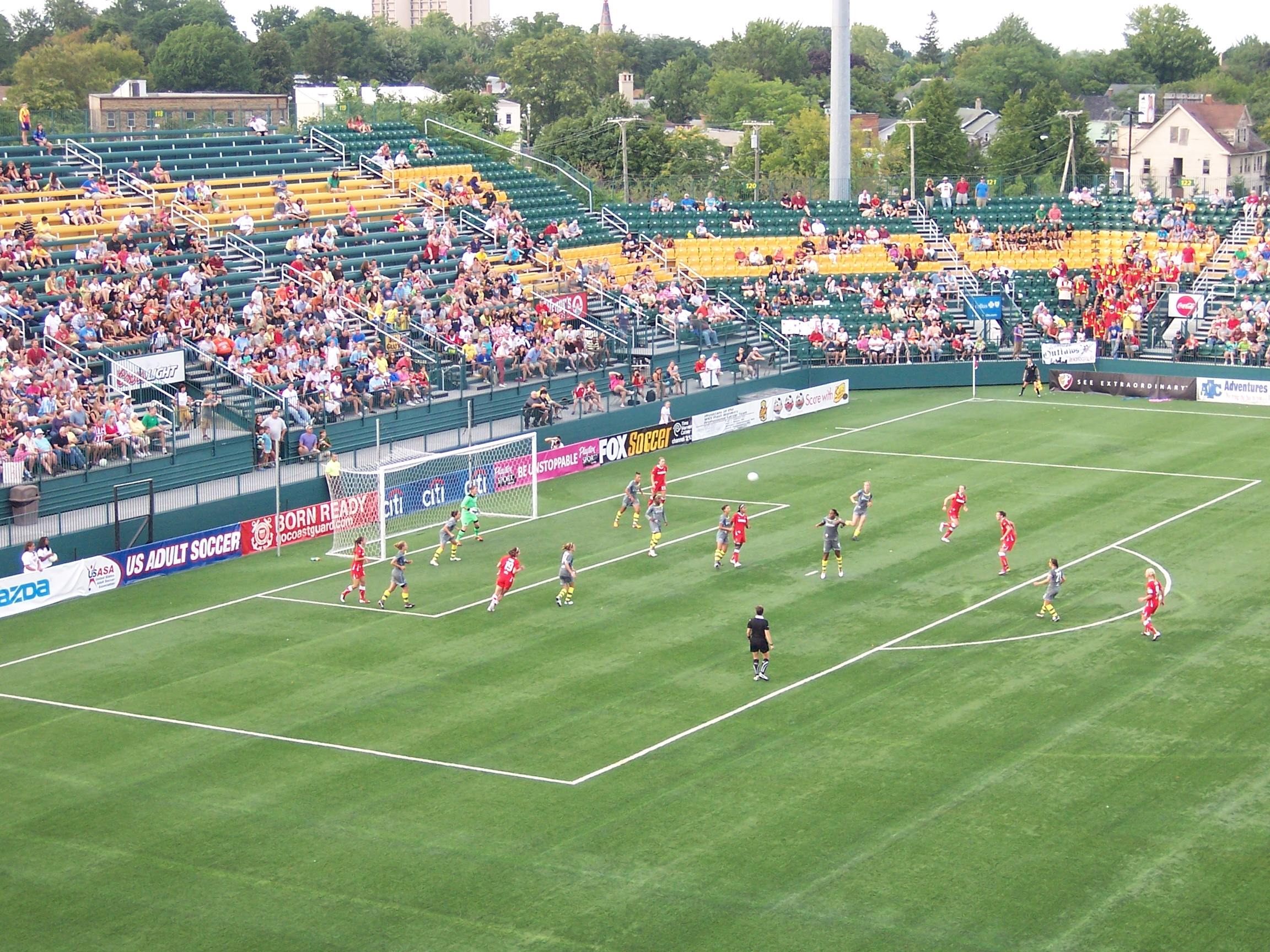
This image shows the 2011 Women's Professional Soccer Championship Game. The game was played at Sahlen's Stadium in Rochester, New York, the home stadium of the Western New York Flash. The Flash defeated the Philadelphia Independence on penalty kicks after a 1–1 tie. The Independence are in gray (green for the goalie); the Flash are in red.

In the sport of association football, teams utilize tactics to inform their organization and decision-making on the pitch. Tactics play a major role in the way the sport is played, and how teams compete with one another. Due to the evolving nature of the sport, tactics have changed significantly since football's inception, evolving from basic and rudimentary principles into elaborate, multi-layered plans that managers and teams employ in an attempt to best their opposition.

The following article will give a summary of the basics of tactics, followed by a timeline of some of the most important developments in the history of tactics in football. Following this will be a section regarding the difference between the tactical philosophies of relationism and positional play, where they originated, and how they affect modern tactics.

== Overview ==
Tactics as they relate to football refer to the general principles, formation, mindset, and philosophy that a coach or manager instructs and trains their players to utilize within the game. Teams can utilize different combinations of these tactical aspects to best suit their desired style of play.

A primary component of a tactic is the formation, which refers to the organization of the team's 11 players when on the pitch. Due to the fluid and dynamic nature of football, the positions that players take up are not set in stone nor do they entirely define the role of that player (with a moderate exception for the goalkeeper), but instead they dictate the general space the player should occupy relative to the positioning of their teammates.

Each formation can operate under different mindsets that dictate the decisions players make on the pitch. For example, the speed at which a team wants to progress the ball up the pitch when they are in possession may dictate the types of passes that players make. Should a team prioritize maintaining possession of the ball, they may utilize shorter, on-the-ground passes to their teammates so that there is a lower risk of dispossession, whereas a team prioritizing fast-paced counterattacks may utilize direct passes over large parts of the field to accelerate the movement of the ball up the pitch. A variety of tactical mindsets have come into prominence over the lifecycle of association football. One such example is Tiki-Taka football, which prioritizes short-ground passes and high possession. This is best exemplified by Pep Guardiola's 2009 FC Barcelona side. Another example would be Gegenpressing, which prioritizes defending from the front, instructing players to attempt to press the enemy team and win back possession as high up the pitch as possible, exemplified by Jurgen Klopp's Premier League-winning 2019-2020 Liverpool side.

Viewers may witness a broad array of tactics and mindsets thought out by coaches and teams across hundreds of different leagues. Such diversity in thought and exercise was not previously present in the sport.

== Eras ==
=== First "formation" ===
In the late 19th century, as football began developing into a structured sport, the way it was played was very different from the way it is played today. At the time, players rarely passed to one another, with defending and cooperation also being less important. This led players to instead focus on dribbling past the opposition. For the most part, players chased the ball around the pitch. Play lacked strategy or pattern. Because of this, there were no formations in the sense we understand them now. If one were to attempt to describe approaches used then in modern terms, the closest descriptions would be 1-1-8 or 1–2–7, with one player in goal (this player is not considered when numbering a formation), one defender, 1 to 2 midfielders, and 7 to 8 players at the top of the pitch attempting to score goals. The lack of passing present at this time was a symptom of the early stages of the offside rule, which prohibited forward passes. This was altered in 1886 to allow forward passes under the condition that three members of the defending team were in between the receiving player and the opposing goal. This alteration did not change the dribble-first mindset present in the sport at the time.

This diagram demonstrates the 2-3-5 or "pyramid" formation utilized in the early 20th century.

=== Passing revolution ===
The first major piece of tactical innovation came from Sheffield, whose team utilized long passes over the heads of opposing players to clear their lines (get the ball past the team's defense). This revelation of passing however is more commonly traced back to the sport's first international match, which was between England and Scotland. England were heavy favorites to win the game due to their weight advantage (an aspect which was far more important at the time), however, through their passing style, Scotland held England to a 0–0 draw, a result considered by many at the time to be a success. Slowly more and more teams began to utilize passing sequences and cooperation play to break down defenses rather than just taking turns trying to dribble past the opposing team. The advent of passing led to the introduction of more defensive formations such as a 2-3-5, which was the most popular formation up until the mid-1920s. Such a structure was more organized than what had been prior, with 5 players dedicated to attacking, and the other 5 focused on defending the goal.

=== First World Cup ===
Football took its next step towards modernity in the late 1920s and early 1930s through the leadership of the World Cup-winning Uruguay national team. Rather than punting the ball in the air over the heads of the opposition, the Uruguayans utilized short and fast passes on the ground that landed at the feet of their teammates, allowing them to control the pace of the match and dominate possession. The side dominated both the 1924 Olympics, defeating Switzerland 3–0 in the final, and the 1930 World Cup, defeating Argentina 4–2 in the final, with their success serving to popularize the use of short passing.

=== Austrian "wunderteam" ===
The Austria national team of the 1930s dominated European football through a similar style to the Uruguayan National team, utilizing quick passing to out-pace opposing sides. Additionally the side, under the coaching of Hugo Meisl, was the first to utilize what is known as a "false 9" which is a role in which a striker will drop deep (into the midfield) to collect the ball in space with their back to goal, as opposed to the common positioning of a striker at the time that was shoulder-to-shoulder with the defender.

This image demonstrates the WM tactic utilized by the majority of teams between the 1930s and 1950s. It utilizes 3 defenders, 2 sets of 2 midfielders, and 3 attackers. This is likely the first implementation of the "Double Pivot" a tactical strategy used today in which teams utilize two defensive midfielders or pivots to control the midfield.

=== "Match of the century" ===
From the 1930s until the 1950s, the most common formation was the WM formation, or a 3-2-2-3, as it provided a good balance of offense and defense, and was well-equipped to deal with the 2-3-5 pyramid formation that dominated the periods prior. These tactics were flipped on their head, however, during the 1953 match between England and Hungary, which has been called the Match of the Century. The Hungarian team at the time utilized a WW formation, or a 2-3-2-3. This formation created an overload in the midfield, giving the team more passing options and opportunities to progress the ball forward, whilst also utilizing a false 9 that created attacking opportunities for the Hungarian wingers. This tactic revolutionized football tactics as a whole as it utilized multiple core principles of football, manufacturing numerical and spatial advantages across the pitch. Through these revolutionary tactics, Hungary won the match 6–3, inciting a complete tactical shift across England and the rest of the world.

=== Catenaccio ===
What spelled the end for both the WM and WW formations was the success of the Italian side Inter Milan with the defensively-minded Catenaccio formation. This formation was used with moderate success in the late 1950s and early 1960s by the likes of Nereo Rocco and Alfredo Foni. This formation didn't reach its potential until utilized by Helenio Herrera at Inter Milan starting in 1960. Herrera's Catenaccio was set up as a 5–3–2, a complete inversion of the once popularized 2-3-5 pyramid. His defensively minded tactic utilized a "libero" or "sweeper" that sat behind the defensive line in order to recover loose balls, help mark opposing strikers, and double up on attacking players when necessary. Tactics in the 1960s such as the Catenaccio prioritized strong and physically minded defenders. Due to the growing popularity of such tactics, offensive-minded tactics of the past began to see less and less use.

=== Total football ===
Football tactics developed even further in the early 1970s, thanks to the strategies employed by Rinus Michels during his coaching stint at Ajax. Beginning in 1970, Rinus Michel, alongside legendary striker Johan Cruyff, employed a tactic known as "Total Football." Under this system, players were instructed to move around with complete freedom, being allowed to play any position on the pitch given the situation called for it, with their teammates responsible for covering their previous role. No one player outside of the goalkeeper was fixed to a predetermined role, allowing for the team to have complete fluidity. This tactic relied heavily on the adaptability and versatility of each player, making it not replicable for each and every team. Ajax found immense success with this tactic from 1971 past the departure of Michels himself, with the team winning 3 consecutive KNVB cups, 2 consecutive Eredivisie Titles, 3 consecutive European Cup titles (now known as UEFA Champions League), and the 1972 International Cup.

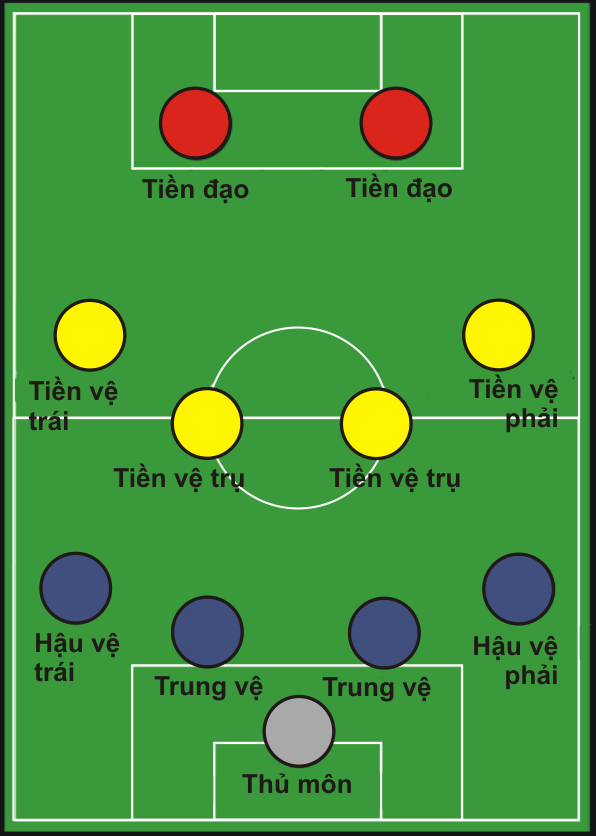
This graphic demonstrates the setup of a 4-4-2 formation.

=== Rise of 4-4-2 ===
The next tactical leap occurred with the rising prevalence of the 4-4-2 formation, beginning in the late 1980s and continuing through the turn of the century. The tactic first found major success at the hands of AC Milan manager Arrigo Sacchi. Through his utilization of a high-pressing 4-4-2 in combination with an aggressive offside trap, Sacchi's Milan managed to win 1 Serie A title, 2 European Cups, 2 European Super Cups, 2 Intercontinental Cups, and 1 Supercoppa Italiana. The 4-4-2 found further success under the use of Sir Alex Ferguson during his time managing Manchester United (1986–2013). When using the 4-4-2 formation (early 1990s - early 2000s), Ferguson's Manchester United side won 8 Premier Leagues, 4 FA Cups, 1 League Cup, 4 FA Community Shields, 1 UEFA Champions League, 1 UEFA Super Cup, 1 Intercontinental Cup, and 1 FIFA Club World Cup. The 4–4–2, particularly under the use of Sir Alex Ferguson, relied on the attacking width provided by the attacking-minded fullbacks.

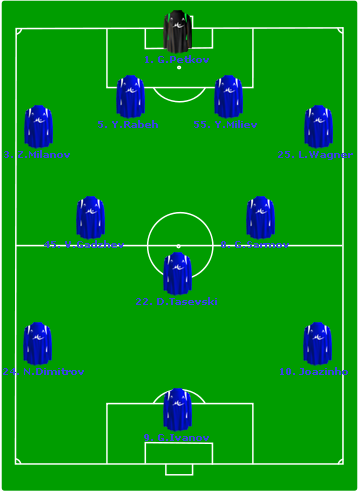
This image demonstrates the 4-3-3 formation utilizing two holding midfielders. There are a variety of other 4-3-3 formations, primarily differentiated by the positioning of the central midfielders.

=== Introduction of 4-3-3 ===
Moving into the late 2000s and early 2010s, teams such as Sir Alex Ferguson's Manchester United and Jose Mourinho's Chelsea began to set up in a 4-3-3 formation. This setup offered an additional player in the midfield compared with the 4–4–2, allowing for teams using a 4-3-3 to dominate the center of the pitch and retain possession for longer. Many 4-3-3's at the time featured a holding midfielder, who occupied a more defensive role and acted as a passing pivot, aiming to help progress the ball up the pitch in possession and win the ball back when out of possession.

=== Tiki-taka ===
Pep Guardiola has been the most successful manager with regards to his trophy cabinet since the turn of the century. From 2008 to 2012 with his time managing FC Barcelona, Guardiola utilized a style of play known as Tiki-Taka football which utilized short and quick ground passes to dominate possession and safely progress the ball up the pitch. Using this tactic, FC Barcelona won 3 La Liga titles, 2 Copa Del Rey's, 3 Supercopa de Espana's, 2 UEFA Champions Leagues, 2 UEFA Super Cups, and 2 FIFA Club World Cups. Pep Guardiola continues to use a similar style of play with his current club Manchester City, which won 4 consecutive Premier League titles from 2020 to 2024, while also winning the Champions League and FA Cup in the 2022/2023 season.

== Relationism vs Positional play ==
One of the most defining aspects of a tactic is its fluidity. Different tactics throughout history have dominated with varying levels of fluidity which regards the positions players are allowed to occupy on a pitch. Total football, for example, heavily emphasized a high level of positional fluidity, encouraging all players to occupy different positions throughout the game whenever the situation called for it. Such a philosophy relied heavily on both the adaptability and creativity of the players and was able to be used to great effect. On the other hand, other tactics like the defensively-minded Catenaccio formation had a rigid structure in which each player had a defined role and position that they were supposed to fulfill throughout the entirety of the match. These varying ideas about fluidity have developed into the modern philosophies of relationism and positional play.

=== Relationism ===
Relationism or "Functional Play" is a philosophy that prioritizes fluidity with regards to the structure of players on the pitch. This philosophy, being based on Total Football, emphasizes individual creativity and the adaptability of the players, giving them the credence to move around the pitch in unpredictable ways. Players are not relegated to specific zones on the pitch within which to play but rather are instructed that they must fill any positional gaps left by the movement of their teammates. Relationist teams do have a formation or structure, however, the team is unconcerned with which of its players are occupying a given position, allowing for players to rotate between different areas of the pitch and create new offensive and defensive patterns. Such a philosophy relies heavily on the individual expression of the players rather than rigid instructions given by the manager. Such principles have also been used to great effect, with one example being Carlo Ancelotti's Real Madrid, who won both La Liga and the UEFA Champions League in the 2023/2024 season.

=== Positional play ===
Positional play (or "Juego de Posicion") in football is a tactical philosophy that prioritizes a high level of structure and organization regarding the formation of the team. Players are each given a clear role that they must follow, serving as a cog in the wheel of the entire team. Such an approach sacrifices some of the creative capacities of the players, forcing them into defined roles that restrict the space they are allowed to occupy on the pitch. Such a philosophy allows managers to have a high level of control over how their team plays, resulting in the gameplay of a team being much more organized and predictable. This makes a team's success heavily dependent on the coach's tactics to find success, as the team moves and behaves in preset ways. This philosophy has been used to great effect in history, one example being Pep Guardiola's aforementioned FC Barcelona side.

== Contemporary positional play ==
Whilst there will always be teams that utilize each above philosophies, during a given period, one tends to prevail over the other. Examples of this are the 50s and 60s in which defensively minded positional play tactics dominated the highest level of football, which contrasts with the 70s in which highly fluid relationist tactics dominated. Recently, the top level of the sport has mostly been defined by positional play.

=== Manchester City (2020-2024) ===
The recent dominance of positional play can best be exemplified by Pep Guardiola's Manchester City. Manchester City has become the first team in Premier League history to win the Premier League title four years in a row, additionally winning one UEFA Champions League, one FA Cup, one Carabao Cup, one UEFA Supercup, and one FIFA Club World Cup, accomplishing this through Guardiola's system of positional play. His side lines up on paper as a 4-2-3-1, however when in possession, the right full back (typically John Stones) would "invert", pushing up into midfield allowing another holding midfielder to move forward, changing the formation to a 3-2-4-1. A back four of two centre backs and two "classic" full backs could experience some defensive frailties facing a counter-attack due to the left full back moving more centrally. Guardiola facilitates this formation further by playing a "Big back four", often fielding Josko Gvardiol (who plays centre back for his nation Croatia) at left full back alongside Stones at right full back, allowing the back three in possession to be staffed by capable centre backs. By bringing this extra player forward in possession, the team can open up new passing angles with which they can position the ball up the pitch utilizing Guardiola's favored style of Tiki-Taka football. In this system, Guardiola assigns set positions for his players to occupy, and teaches them all the different movements and passing sequences they can utilize within these positions. In combination with his Tiki-Taka style of play, his side can progress the ball up the pitch as a singular unit, using predetermined passing patterns. Each player has defined roles they must fill, and preset rotations and movements that they must memorize as to remove any unnecessary thought or decision-making from the player within the game.

=== Bayern Munich (2019/2020) ===
FC Bayern Munich badge.

In the 2019/2020 season, under the management of Hansi Flick, FC Bayern Munich was highly dominant both on the domestic and international stage, completing a treble by winning the UEFA Champions League, Bundesliga, and the DFB-Pokal. Flick accomplished this through a unique application of positional play. Flick's side utilized a 4-2-3-1 formation that heavily focused on building play out from the back while maintaining possession. The team accomplished this by utilizing set attacking structures, including the forward movement of the fullbacks and the dropping deep of the holding midfielder, to create width, and provide passing options, all while maintaining a strong formational structure. Additionally, out of possession, the team utilized an aggressive high press in which they would put pressure on the ball while under opposition possession to force a mistake and regain possession of the ball in an advanced portion of the pitch. A feature of this high press is that defensively players are each tasked with putting pressure on specific sections of the pitch, restricting their rotation between one another.

== Development of modern relationism ==
Despite the recent dominance of positional play, many smaller sides have begun to utilize relationist philosophies to achieve unexpected levels of success.

=== Bayer 04 Leverkusen (2023/2024) ===
One such example was the historic 2023/2024 season of Bayer 04 Leverkusen. Under the coaching of Xabi Alonso the club, which was established in 1904, managed to win their first-ever Bundesliga title, becoming the first team to ever go undefeated in the Bundesliga and additionally winning the DFB-Pokal, and making it to the final of the Europa League, with their only loss of the season being in said final versus Atalanta BC. To make this happen, Xabi Alonso utilized a 3-4-2-1 formation that featured two highly aggressive wing-backs who provided width in possession and dropped back into a fullback role on defense, leaving the team to line up out of possession in a 5-3-2 or 5-2-2-1. Bayer 04 Leverkusen utilizes relationism in possession when their formation resembles more of a 4-2-3-1, with holding midfielders being encouraged to fall back into the defensive line and the center-backs and left wing-backs being encouraged to move up the pitch and find space. Additionally, when playing out of defense, players often come deep and offer short passing options, creating positional overloads to help rotate possession and navigate any pressure from the opposition's press.

=== Bologna FC 1909 (2023/2024) ===
In the 2023/2024 season, under the management of Thiago Motta, Bologna FC 1909 managed to place 5th in the Serie A, securing themselves a UEFA Champions League Group Stage spot for the first time in the club's history since 1964. Motta formulated his side in what he famously calls a 2-7-2 formation, however, Motta refers to these numbers as occupying vertical channels of the pitch as opposed to how formations are usually numbered. The side's base formation is a 4-3-3 in which there are 2 players on each wing and 6 outfield players in the middle channel of the pitch. Motta's side also utilizes relationist philosophies, encouraging the striker to drop into the midfield often to help overload the midfield, and encouraging players such as the wingers and fullbacks to rotate with one another in possession to drag the opposition out of position and create space behind the lines. Motta additionally encouraged rotation between his center-backs and holding midfielders to accomplish the same goal of creating space.
