= One-touch football =

Playing style of association football

In association football, one-touch football is passing or shooting the ball with one touch rather than trapping or dribbling the ball first. Often an effective tactic for quick shots from passes or crosses, "flick" passes or for "give and go" passes. One or two touch scrimmages or drills are also used to improve teamwork and passing skills.

This skill is most commonly executed by teams with skillful midfielders and a cohesive frontline. The attackers usually act like target men bringing in other players by simple but elegant 'flicks' or just slight and accurate touches. This style of football, when executed effectively, creates many decoys for opposing defenders, and also creates space for the attacking midfielders to try long-range efforts. It has been observed to be most effective when used in counterattacks by teams with quick and visionary attackers.

One-touch football is exhibited by clubs such as Barcelona, Chelsea, Arsenal, and international teams such as Brazil, Spain, Argentina, and the Netherlands team of the 1970s.

== See also ==
- Total Football
- Tiki-taka
- Possession football
