= Antoni Daimiel =

Spanish journalist

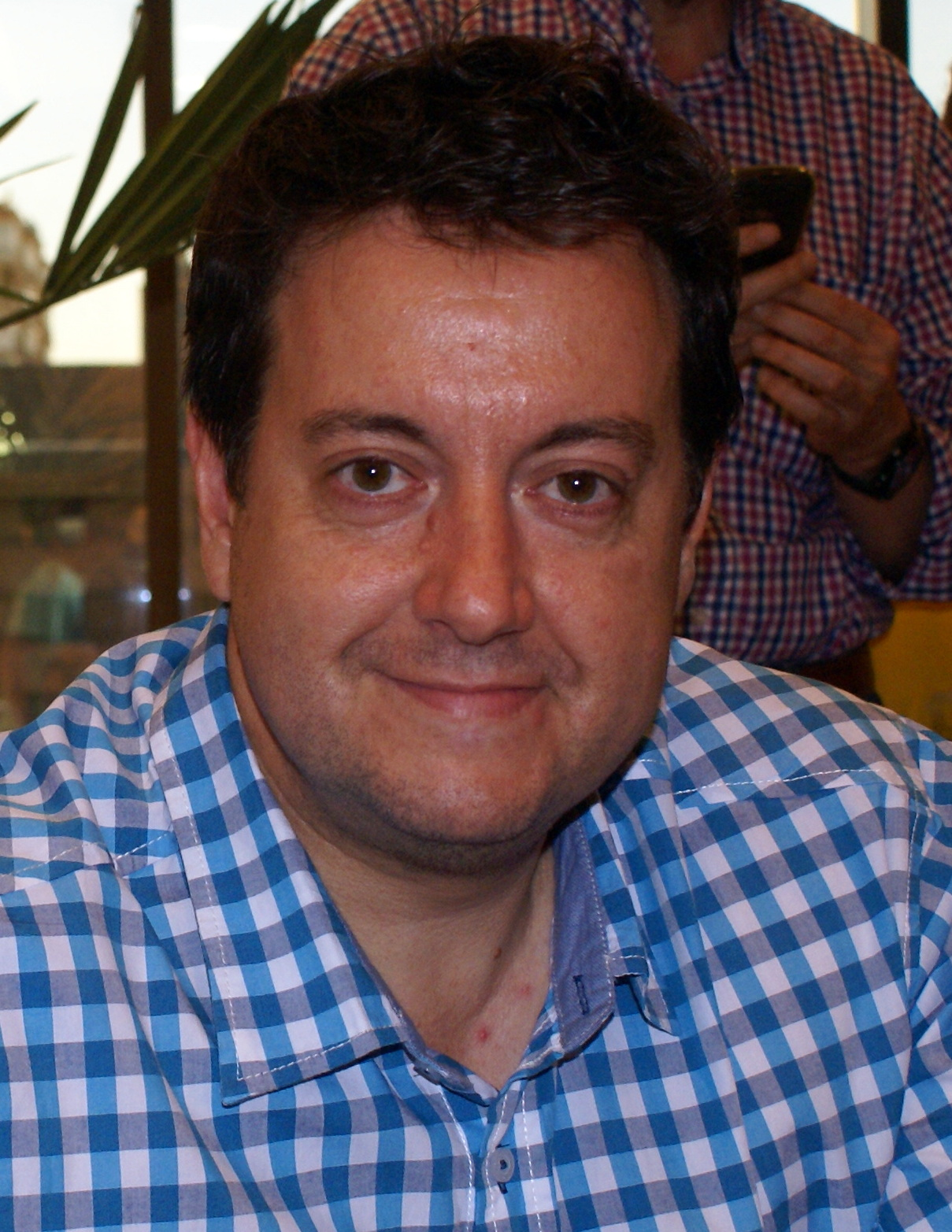
- Born: Antoni Daimiel Bolaños; 15 February 1970 (age 56); Ciudad Real, Spain
- Occupation: Journalist
- Employers: Cadena Ser; As; Canal+; El Periódico de Catalunya

Antoni Daimiel Bolaños (born 15 February 1970) is a Spanish sports journalist specialising in basketball and the NBA, who works for As, Cadena SER, Canal+, Cuatro and El Periódico de Catalunya. He became known on television in the mid-1990s, when he formed a duo with sports narrator Andrés Montes.

== Biography ==
Daimiel was born in Ciudad Real, but at the age of four his family moved to Valladolid, where he spent all his childhood, studied at the Marist school "Centro Cultural Vallisoletano" and finished his studies at the Marist school "La Inmaculada" in the same city. After enrolling in law courses without success, he went to Madrid to study journalism at the Complutense University.

From then on, he began working for Canal+ from the start of broadcasting in 1990, working as a sports editor, and for several years he became a reporter and editor of El día después. During those years, he also worked as a narrator for college basketball (NCAA), and in 1995 his channel asked him to commentate NBA games. His first coverage in the USA came when he accompanied Andrés Montes as commentator on the NBA All-Star game, replacing Santiago Segurola, on 11 February 1996.

Antoni Daimiel formed a commentary pairing with the popular broadcaster for more than ten years in a row, until Montes left for La Sexta when the channel began broadcasting. Antoni remained on Canal+ commentating American league games along with former Serbian player Nikola Lonćar, but in October 2007 he announced his retirement from NBA nights on pay TV.

The journalist remained on Canal+ with a programme called "Españoles NBA" and through various reports on the programme Informe Robinson. He has also collaborated with Onda Cero since 2006. Daimiel returned to basketball broadcasting in June 2009, commenting on the playoffs and the final in which Pau Gasol became the first Spaniard to win the NBA with the Los Angeles Lakers. From then on, he returned to his previous job as NBA commentator for Canal+. In the summer of 2010, Daimiel was hired to be a regular commentator for Cadena SER and a columnist for Diario AS. Antoni Daimiel continues to collaborate in the Official NBA Magazine and has become the promotional image of the NBA 2K11 videogame.

Throughout his career, he has participated in two programmes that have received the Ondas Award: El día después (1992) and Informe Robinson (2009). He also received the 1996 Aros de Oro award for best sports report at the Jaca Sports Film Festival.

In May 2013, he published a book entitled El sueño de mi desvelo, in which he recounts anecdotes and testimonies from his nightly NBA broadcasts and his travels around the United States.

Together with Guille Giménez, he currently forms the main duo of NBA narrators in Spain on Movistar+. Together with Guille and Piti Hurtado, he hosts the weekly show Generación NBA.

Since 2015, he has also presented, together with Juanma López Iturriaga the programme "Colgados del Aro" on the YouTube platform.

In February 2021, he receives the 'Gigante Comunicación' award at the 33rd 'Gigantes del Basket' magazine awards, in recognition of his career.

== NBA Finals broadcast ==
Daimiel, since he has been part of the Canal+ (now Movistar+) staff, has broadcast, live from the United States, several NBA All-Star Games, as well as almost all of the NBA Finals since 1996, teaming up with Andrés Montes, David Carnicero and Guille Giménez:

Year	Western Conference Champion	Result	Eastern Conference Champion	Narrator
1996 – Details	Seattle SuperSonics	2–4	Chicago Bulls	Andrés Montes
1997 – Details	Utah Jazz	2–4	Chicago Bulls	Andrés Montes
1998 – Details	Utah Jazz	2–4	Chicago Bulls	Andrés Montes
1999 – Details	San Antonio Spurs	4–1	New York Knicks	Andrés Montes
2000 – Details	Los Angeles Lakers	4–2	Indiana Pacers	Andrés Montes
2001 – Details	Los Angeles Lakers	4–1	Philadelphia 76ers	Andrés Montes
2002 – Details	Los Angeles Lakers	4–0	New Jersey Nets	Andrés Montes
2003 – Details	San Antonio Spurs	4–2	New Jersey Nets	Andrés Montes
2004 – Details	Los Angeles Lakers	1–4	Detroit Pistons	Andrés Montes
2005 – Details	San Antonio Spurs	4–3	Detroit Pistons	Andrés Montes
2006 – Details	Dallas Mavericks	2–4	Miami Heat	David Carnicero
2007 – Details	San Antonio Spurs	4–0	Cleveland Cavaliers	David Carnicero
2009 – Details	Los Angeles Lakers	4–1	Orlando Magic	David Carnicero
2010 – Details	Los Angeles Lakers	4–3	Boston Celtics	David Carnicero
2011 – Details	Dallas Mavericks	4–2	Miami Heat	David Carnicero
2012 – Details	Oklahoma City Thunder	1–4	Miami Heat	David Carnicero
2013 – Details	San Antonio Spurs	3–4	Miami Heat	David Carnicero
2014 – Details	San Antonio Spurs	4–1	Miami Heat	David Carnicero
2015 – Details	Golden State Warriors	4–2	Cleveland Cavaliers	David Carnicero
2016 – Details	Golden State Warriors	3–4	Cleveland Cavaliers	Guille Giménez
2017 – Details	Golden State Warriors	4–1	Cleveland Cavaliers	Guille Giménez
2018 – Details	Golden State Warriors	4–0	Cleveland Cavaliers	Guille Giménez
2019 – Details	Golden State Warriors	2–4	Toronto Raptors	Guille Giménez
2020 – Details	Los Angeles Lakers	4–2	Miami Heat	Guille Giménez
2021 – Details	Milwaukee Bucks	4–2	Phoenix Suns	Guille Giménez

- The 2020 and 2021 finals were broadcast from the Movistar+ studios (in Tres Cantos, Spain), due to travel constraints due to the COVID-19 pandemic.

== Publications ==
- (ISBN 9788415242239) El sueño de mi desvelo (2013), Corner.
