= Zenaida Manfugás =

- Birth name: Zenaida Elvira González Manfugás
- Born: February 22, 1922; Guantanamo, Cuba
- Died: May 2, 2012; Elizabeth, New Jersey
- Occupation: pianist
- Years active: 1949–2012

Zenaida Elvira González Manfugás (February 22, 1922 - May 2, 2012) was a Cuban-born American-naturalized pianist, considered to be one of the best Cuban pianists in history.

== Biography ==
Manfugás was born on February 22, 1922 in Guantánamo, Cuba. Her father was Judge Amando González Veranés and her mother, Andrea Manfugás Crombet, was a renowned pianist and teacher. She had two sisters: Alicia and Aida Esther. Her mother's family is descended from the renowned composer Nene Manfugás, who was a performer of Sonnets in the first half of the 20th century.

Her family settled in Baracoa. In this city her father served as municipal judge while her mother founded a music school linked with the Conservatorio Orbón. She studied in Santiago de Cuba. Manfugás and her sisters began piano lessons at age five, under their mother's tutelage. At age seven, Manfugás was able to play Mozart "Coronation Mass", and Beethoven "Concerto 5". Manfugás gave her first concert in 1949 in Havana, playing at the Anfiteatro de Avenida del Puerto and being part of the Gonzalo Roig's Municipal Band. In her concert she played the "Concerto in A Minor" by Edvard Grieg. This became a frequent venue for Manfugás.

Three years after her debut, Journalist Agustín Tamargo got that the then President of the Colegio de Belén University in Havana, Father Joseph Rubino, gave to Manfugás a scholarship to study music in Spain and Roig asked her to play at Havana's Cathedral Square.

So, in 1952, Manfugás moved to Spain and started her studies at the Real Conservatorio Superior de Música de Madrid (Royal Conservatory of Music of Madrid), where she was a student of Professor Tomas Andrade de Silva. She performed "concerts and premieres" in Spain, where she performed Dos Danzas (song composed by Harold Gramatges) in 1953. She then moved to Paris where she studied under the tutelage of Walter Gieseking.

Where she returned to Cuba in 1958, she was asked to play her music at the Auditorium Theater on December 21 that year. However, later, the organizers convinced him to delay the concert until January 9, 1959, but in this year, Cuba was "in the revolutionary ferment of the triumph" of Fidel Castro's guerrilla movement and Manfugás was not able to play her music at the Auditorium until 1960.

Since then, Manfugás was very active as a pianist in Cuba, and sometimes accompanied classical orchestras, such as the National Symphony Orchestra and the National Chamber Orchestra. In addition, she was professor at the "Alejandro García Caturla" Conservatory in Marianao and served as national advisory in the cathedra of piano at the Amadeo Roldan Conservatory, in Cuba.

Manfugás conducted diverses tours in Europe (in places like Belgium and Russia) and Asia (in countries like China and Japan), for which she was widely praised. Later, she also played in Canada.

In 1974, Manfugás went to the United States, where she performed throughout the 50 states. Two years after, the pianist emigrated to this country, where settled in Elizabeth, New Jersey, for good.

In 1979, she visited Cuba for the last time.

In exile, Manfugás played her music in places like Spain, Paris, Italia, New York City and Miami. She also gave a concert as a soloist in the New World Symphony in Miami and was a professor at Kean University of New Jersey, where she taught History of Music. In December 2010, the Apogee Foundation on Cultural Center Cuba Ocho of Miami held a ceremony in her honor, although she could not perform, as "she was recovering from a recent surgery".

Her final concert in Miami, where she performed frequently, took place on May 22, 2011, with the musical work "Tres pianos, Tres intérpretes" ("Three pianos, Three performers"), "a concert held at the Wertheim Center International University of Florida", where she alternated with the Jesus y Eugenia Ruspoli Armengol.

She had cancer and suffered from several health complications. Zenaida Manfugás died on May 2, 2012, at 4:30 pm ET in Elizabeth. According to different sources, she died due to a cardiac arrest or cancer. Her remains were cremated on Sunday May 13.

== Personal life ==
She was settled in Elizabeth, New Jersey, in 1974. When she became a U.S. citizen, she adopted her mother's maiden name in her honor, since her mother had taught her how to play the piano. In 1955, she gave birth to a son in Spain, Andrés Montes, who was one of the most known and respected sports journalists of both the radio and television in that country and who died in 2009 at age 53.

== Curiosities ==
- The musician Gonzalo Roig regarded that Zenaida Manfugás "was the best interpreter of Cuban music, and one of the best pianists" of Cuba, and Lecuona "regarded her as the best interpreter of his music".
- She was a great reader and she asked books from the library every month.
- She never recorded a studio album. The recordings that exist were from live performances. Several compilation albums interpreting the works of Cuban composers were released. "Two volumes were entitled" Por siempre Lecuona (Lecuona Forever) (1999), compilations from multiple live performances. Those volumes are formed by the most popular works of Lecuona.
- In 1964, Manfugás participated in the documentary Nosotros la música, directed by Rogelio París.
- At the time of her death, she lived in a modest apartment for the elderly and, like many other masters of classical music, died in poverty.
