= Andrés Montes =

Spanish sports journalist (1955–2009)

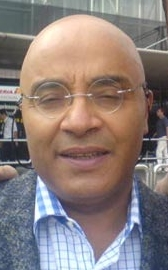
- Andrés Montes in 2005.
- Born: Andrés Antonio Montes González; 27 November 1955; Madrid, Spain
- Died: 16 October 2009 (aged 53); Madrid, Spain

Andrés Antonio Montes González (1955–2009) was a Spanish sportswriter, journalist and commentator.

== Biography ==
He was born in Madrid on 27 November 1955 to Antonio Montes Seoane, a Galician merchant from Vigo (father) and Cuban pianist Zenaida Manfugas (mother), but he was primarily raised by Lorenza, a Segovian nurse. He began his career in 1980 mainly in basketball and football broadcasting, working for Cadena COPE and various public and private radio stations. In 1996, he began commentating on NBA matches on Spanish television for Canal +.

In 2008 he broadcast Power Catch. On 20 September 2009 he retired from La Sexta after the Eurobasket final. He was known for his uninhibited and flashy style, as well as his use of slang and linguistic fillers, which was the influence of him coining the popular football phrase Tiki-taka.

Montes was found dead in his home on the night of 16 October 2009, with the cause of death being a heart attack.
