= Tiki-taka =

Spanish style of play in football

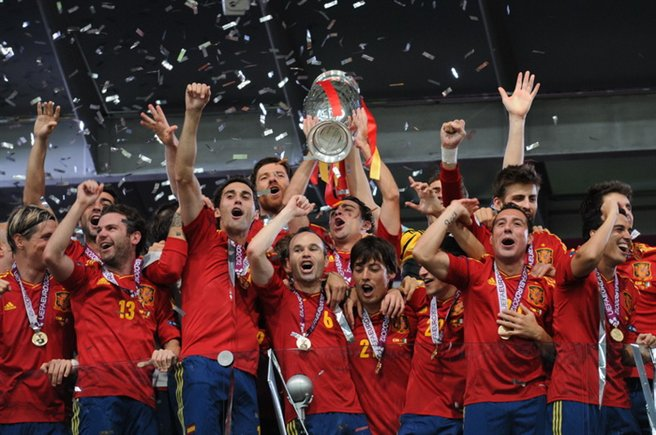
Spain's players celebrating their Euro 2012 victory. Barcelona and Spain dominated the world of football in the same period (2008–2012).

Tiki-taka (Spanish: tiquitaca, pronounced [ˈtikiˈtaka]) is a style of play in football characterised by short passing and movement, working the ball through various channels, and maintaining possession. The style is primarily associated with the Spain national team since 2006 under the managers Luis Aragonés and Vicente del Bosque. Tiki-taka methods were eventually embraced by the La Liga club Barcelona from 2009, especially during the era of manager Pep Guardiola.

== Predecessors ==
Earlier tactics that, like tiki-taka, rose to success in their times by stressing passing and movement without the ball include the Schalker Kreisel ("Schalke spinning top") system employed by Schalke 04 that used quick and short passing to confuse and overwhelm the opponent, winning six German championships between 1934 and 1942, and the Total Football used by Ajax and the Dutch national team during the 1970s.

Manager Angelo Niculescu adopted a Temporizare ("delaying") style, which is also considered a precursor of tiki-taka, with the Romania national football team. The team would try to keep possession of the ball for as long as possible, using repeated and short passes until a breach in the opposition defense was found. Using this tactic, he transformed the Romanian national team and took them to the 1970 FIFA World Cup in Mexico after a 32-year absence. In 2011 FIFA named Niculescu the inventor of the tiki-taka style of play as did UEFA in 2014.

== Origins and development ==
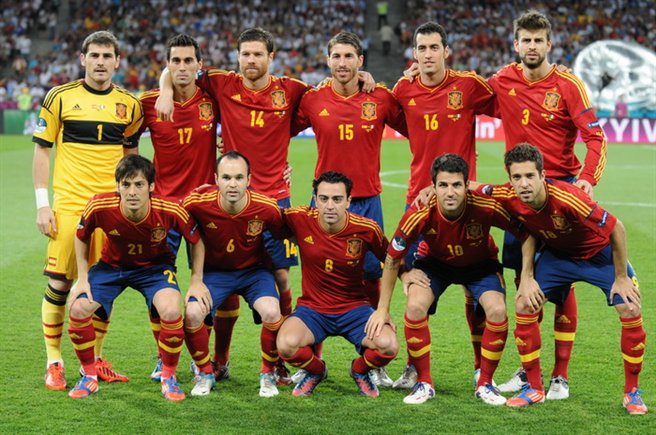
Spain national football team that won Euro 2012

=== Etymology ===
The Spanish broadcaster Andrés Montes is generally credited with coining and popularizing the phrase tiki-taka during his television commentary on LaSexta for the 2006 World Cup, although the term was already in colloquial use in Spain's football and may have originated as a critical or derogatory term by then Athletic Bilbao coach Javier Clemente. In his live commentary of the Spain versus Tunisia match, Montes used the phrase to describe Spain's precise, elegant passing style: "Estamos tocando tiki-taka tiki-taka" ("we are playing tiki-taka tiki-taka").

=== Barcelona ===
Johan Cruyff introduced the elements of what came to be known as tiki-taka during his tenure as manager of Barcelona from 1988 to 1996. The style of play continued to develop under fellow Dutch managers Louis van Gaal and Frank Rijkaard and has been adopted by other La Liga teams. Barcelona's Dutch managers made it a point to promote from their youth system, and Barcelona's La Masia youth academy has been credited with producing a generation of technically talented, often physically small, players such as Pedro, Xavi, Andrés Iniesta, Cesc Fàbregas and Lionel Messi; players with excellent touch, vision and passing, who excel at maintaining possession.

Pep Guardiola managed Barcelona from 2008 to 2012, winning 14 titles. Under his guidance, tiki-taka was established. This was partly due to Guardiola's visionary coaching, partly due to an exceptional generation of players, many of whom had been schooled in La Masia's idiosyncratic style, and partly due to Barcelona's ability to sustain intense pressure on the ball. The 2005 update to the offside law was also a contributing factor: by forcing defenders deeper, the law expanded the effective playing area, making players' size matter less and allowing technical skills to flourish. The tactic shared Dutch Total Football's principles of high defensive line, positional interchange and use of possession to control the game. Tiki-taka diverged from its Total Football roots by subordinating everything to the pass: Guardiola played a centre-forward as a false nine to keep the ball moving fluidly from different angles; he played the full-backs higher; he selected midfielders in defence to exploit their passing ability; and he forced the goalkeeper to play the ball out from the back.

The guiding principle of this type of play was efficient use of space. The teams must narrow the playing space while defending, and must expand the playing space wider while attacking. The objective was to make quick and short passes, till an opponent was caught out of position and space was created. Guardiola also used the concept of positional play, which in simple words mean that the pitch is divided into different zones, and that no more than two players must occupy the same line vertically and no more than three players should occupy the same line horizontally. Guardiola trained his players by painting lines on the training ground to show players what the zones were. This training made it an instinct of the players to find zones where they can receive or play a pass. Thus, for a layman, it would have look like passing and keeping possession, it was actually quite calculated.

=== Spain national team ===
Raphael Honigstein describes the tiki-taka played by the Spain national team at the 2010 World Cup as "a radical style that only evolved over the course of four years," arising from Spain's decision in 2006 that "they weren't physical and tough enough to outmuscle opponents, so instead wanted to concentrate on monopolising the ball." Luis Aragonés and Vicente del Bosque successfully employed the tiki-taka style with the Spain national team; during their tenure, Spain won three consecutive major titles: Euro 2008 (under Aragonés), the 2010 FIFA World Cup, and Euro 2012 (under del Bosque).

== Tactical overview ==
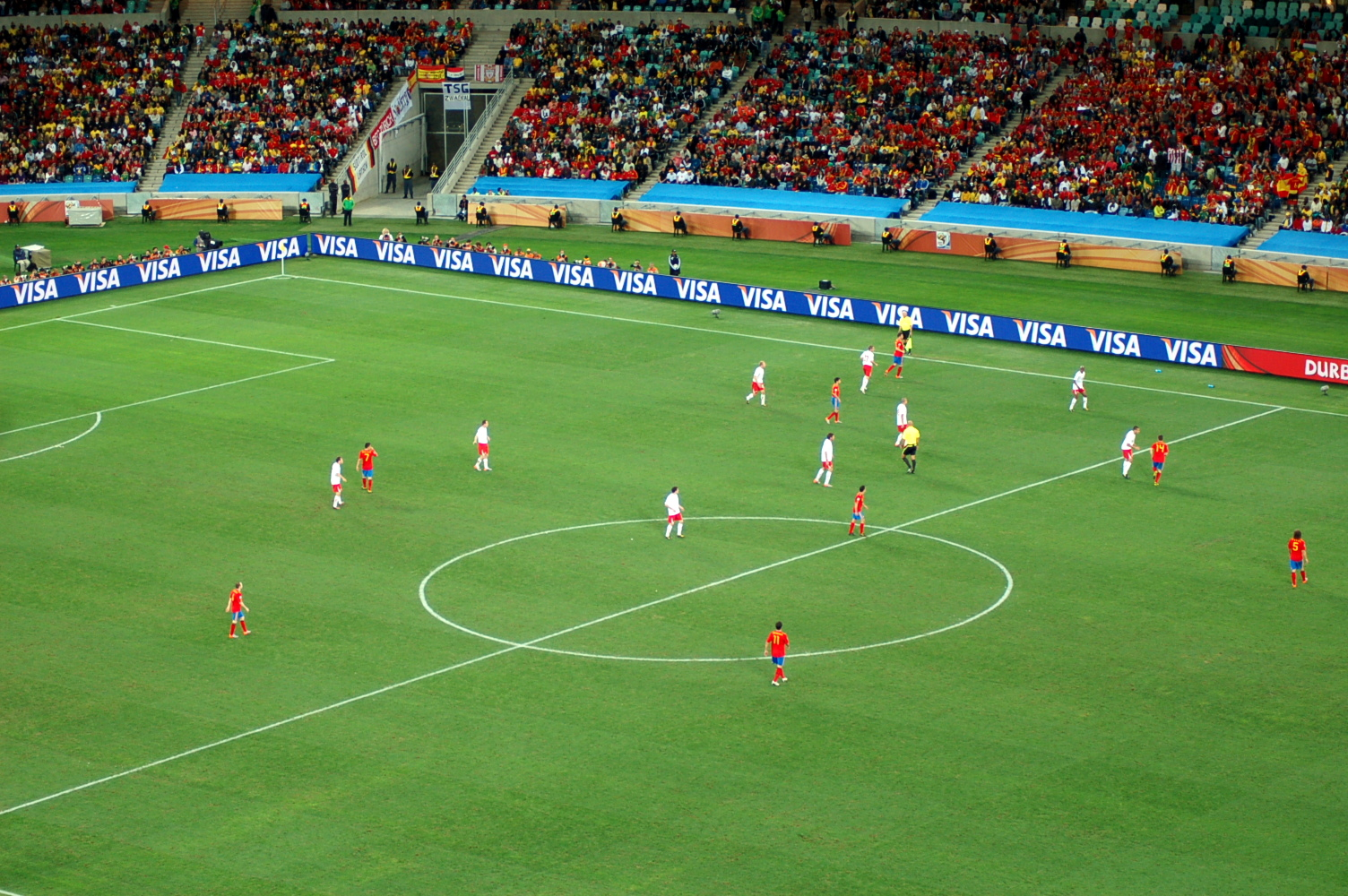
Spanish (in red) midfield position against Switzerland (in white) at the World Cup in 2010

Tiki-taka is founded upon team unity and a comprehensive understanding in the geometry of space on a football field.

Pep Guardiola's example of tiki-taka at Barcelona is considered the best application of this style after they won the sextuple in 2009. Barcelona played with a high defensive line usually applying the offside trap with midfielders providing support to defenders to make more passing options available. Defenders are patient, preferring safe pass options looking for midfielders with the ball circulated anywhere on the pitch waiting for a gap to make a vertical pass. The team created most of its chances by depending on through balls and executing give and go passes, usually with Lionel Messi involved in the action. Guardiola preferred freedom in the final third of the pitch, which was effective as the team created many chances per match.

Tiki-taka has been variously described as "a style of play based on making your way to the back of the net through short passing and movement," a "short passing style in which the ball is worked carefully through various channels," and a "nonsensical phrase that has come to mean short passing, patience and possession above all else." The style involves roaming movement and positional interchange among midfielders, moving the ball in intricate patterns, and sharp, one- or two-touch passing. Tiki-taka is "both defensive and offensive in equal measure" – the team is always in possession, so does not need to switch between defending and attacking. Commentators have contrasted tiki-taka with "route one physicality" and with the higher-tempo passing of Arsène Wenger's 2007–08 Arsenal side, which employed Cesc Fàbregas as the only channel between defence and attack. Tiki-taka is associated with flair, creativity and touch, but can also be taken to a "slow, directionless extreme" that sacrifices effectiveness for aesthetics.

== Notable success ==
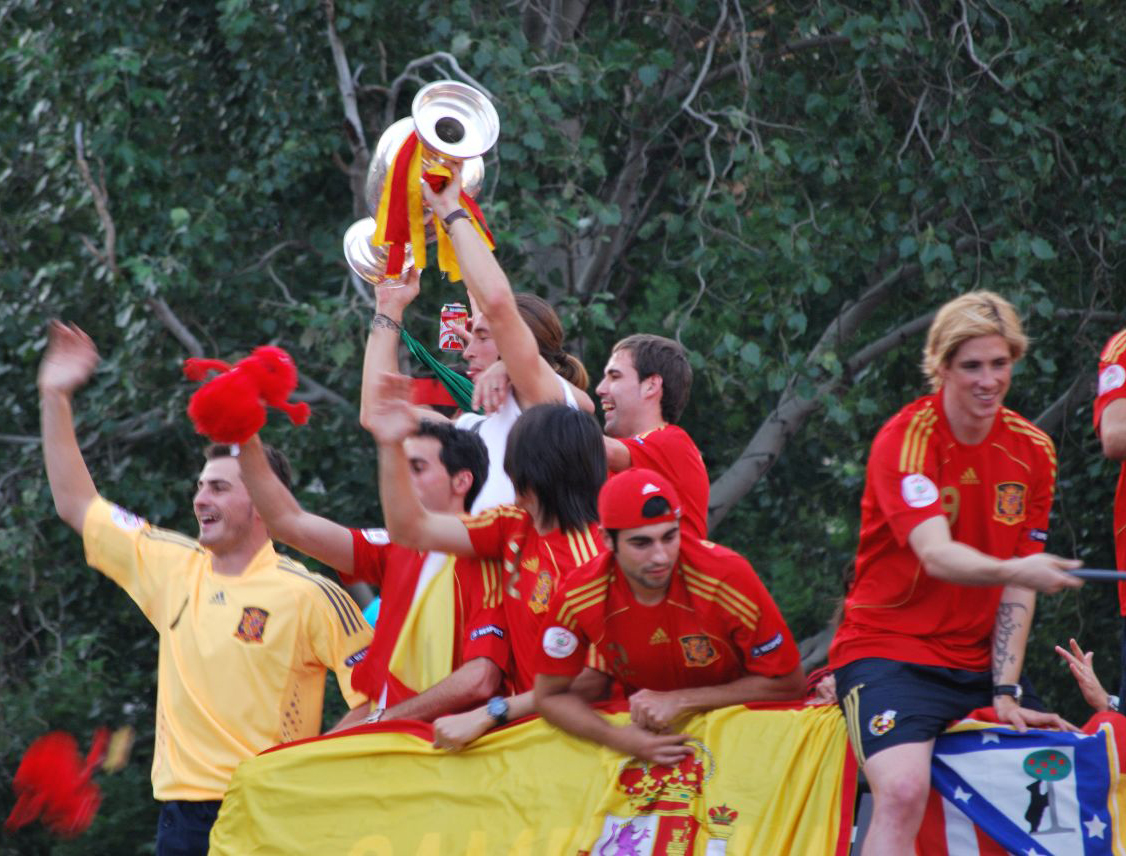
Spain, European champions in 2008

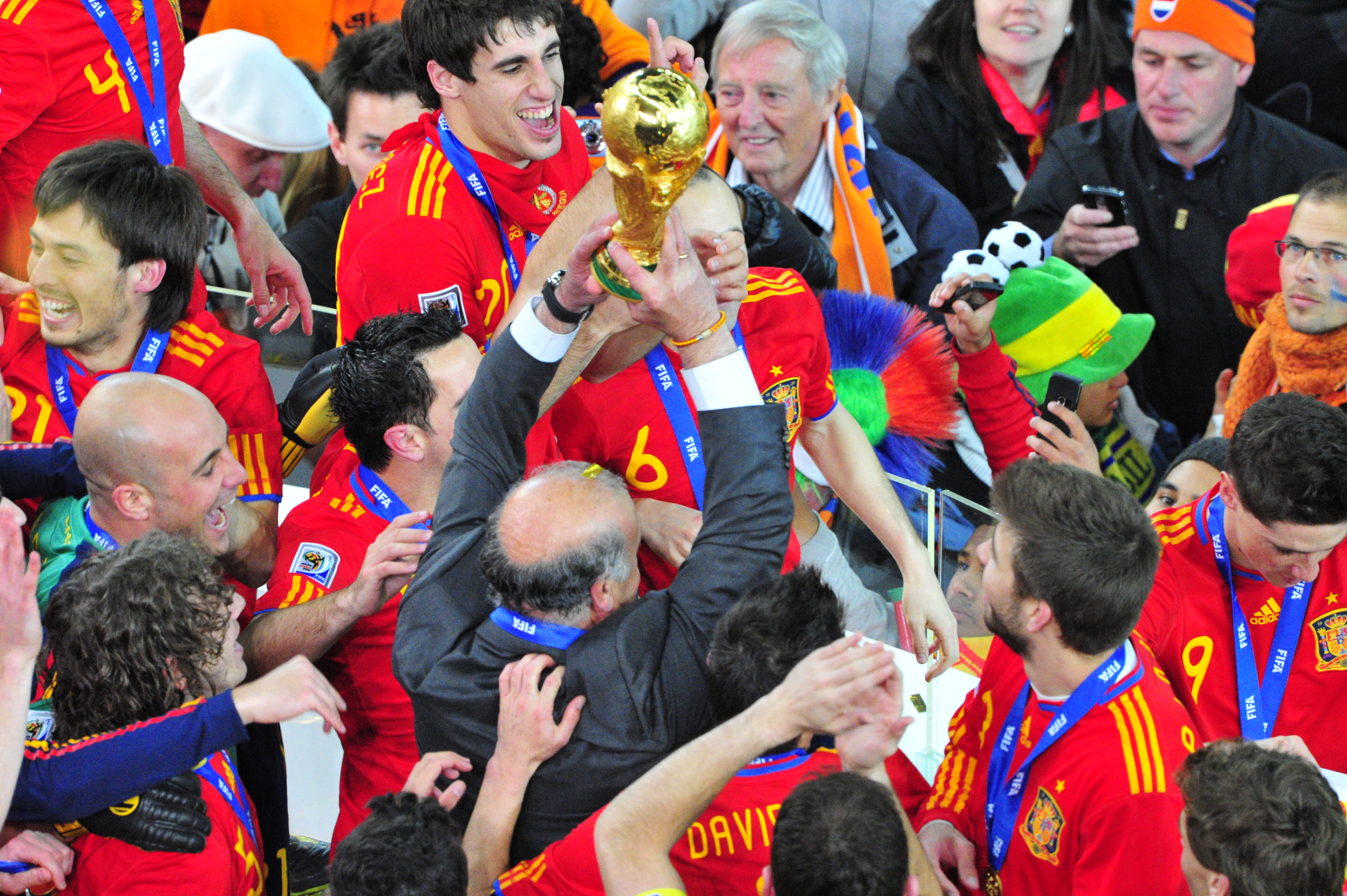
Spain, world champions in 2010

Tiki-taka has been used successfully by the Spain national team, first under Luis Aragonés to win Euro 2008, and subsequently under Vicente del Bosque to win the 2010 World Cup and Euro 2012. It was also used to great success by Barcelona under Pep Guardiola between 2008 and 2012; his team won six trophies in 2009 (including a Continental Treble of La Liga, the Copa del Rey, and the 2008–09 UEFA Champions League, followed by the UEFA Super Cup, the Spain Super Cup, and the FIFA Club World Cup). The team's attacking, possession-based tiki-taka tactics and 4–3–3 formation also allowed them to win two more consecutive La Liga titles, as well as the 2010–11 UEFA Champions League, among other trophies.

While Luis Enrique adopted a faster and more direct tactical approach during his tenure as Barcelona's manager, he also used some similar aspects of tiki-taka, such as an exciting, attack–minded, possession–based passing game, and building plays from the back on the ground, while instead successfully modifying other elements of his team's gameplay, and abandoning the use of long balls that had characterised Tata Martino's spell with the team. He led Barcelona to a second continental treble during the 2014–15 season, capturing La Liga, the Copa del Rey, and the 2014–15 UEFA Champions League.

Sid Lowe identifies Luis Aragonés' tempering of tiki-taka with pragmatism as a key factor in Spain's success in Euro 2008. Aragonés used tiki-taka to "protect a defense that appeared suspect [...], maintain possession and dominate games" without taking the style to "evangelical extremes." None of Spain's first six goals in the tournament came from tiki-taka: five came from direct breaks and one from a set play. For Lowe, Spain's success in the 2010 World Cup was evidence of the meeting of two traditions in Spain's football: the "powerful, aggressive, direct" style that earned the silver medal-winning 1920 Antwerp Olympics team the nickname La Furia Roja ("The Red Fury"), and the tiki-taka style of the contemporary Spain team, which focused on a collective, short-passing, technical and possession-based game.

Analyzing Spain's semi-final victory over Germany at the 2010 World Cup, Honigstein described the team's tiki-taka style as "the most difficult version of football possible: an uncompromising passing game, coupled with intense, high pressing." For Honigstein, tiki-taka is "a significant upgrade" of Total Football because it relies on ball movement rather than players switching position. Tiki-taka allowed Spain to "control both the ball and the opponent."

At the 2011 Women's World Cup, the Japan women's national football team (Nadeshiko) employed a form of tiki-taka under coach Norio Sasaki. They upset hosts Germany and the United States to win the tournament.

== Criticism ==
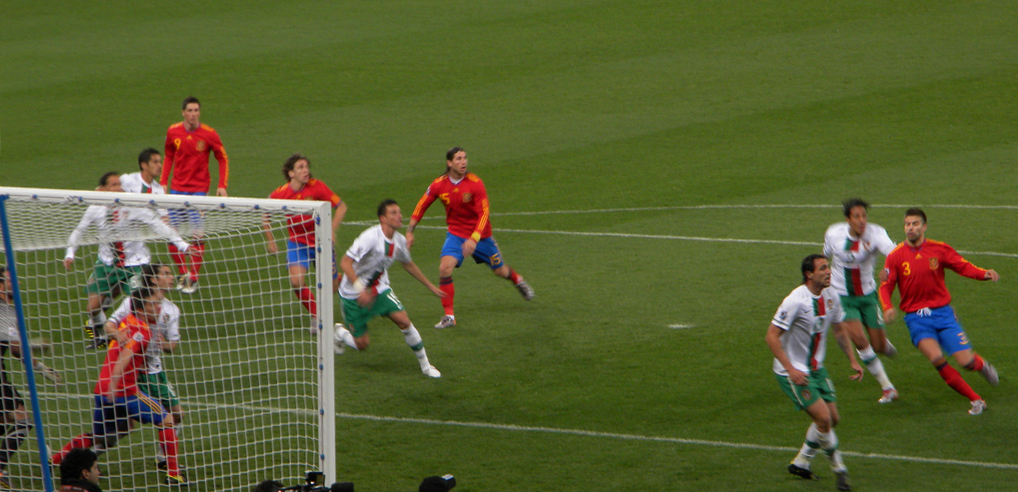
Spain defeated Portugal 1–0 in the Round of 16 at the World Cup in 2010, and were criticized by Portuguese national and then-Real Madrid manager José Mourinho for their "sterile" techniques.

While the tiki-taka style has been praised by several pundits and footballing figures, due to its success and attacking approach, it has also been criticised at times. During Euro 2012, for example, the Spain national side drew criticism in the media for adopting a striker-less formation and a dull brand of tiki-taka, which produced relatively few goals, despite the team dominating possession throughout the tournament, with Spain averaging 63% ball possession during their three group matches; in the lead–up to their final victory, Spain averaged 58 passes per shot, and only 1.8 goals per match, which was 25% lower than the tournament average of 2.4. Journalist Guy Hedgecoe from Iberosphere argued that tiki-taka is not entertaining any more due to the lack of pure strikers in the Spain national team and their use of a false "9" or a midfield player as a forward. This makes the game of football full of midfielders and no strikers or defenders. Hedgecoe claimed, "With no strikers, no defenders…no goalkeeper, perhaps, just 11 technically blessed midfielders merrily passing the ball around until someone walks it into the net".

José Mourinho has likewise criticised the Spain national team for using sterile techniques, such as having no strikers and only midfielders. Former Arsenal manager Arsène Wenger had said that the Spain football team had changed their philosophy, becoming less attacking and more negative, saying: "Originally they wanted possession in order to attack and win the game; now it seems to be first and foremost a way not to lose" during Euro 2012, a competition Spain had won. Others believed that the lack of emphasis on the offensive led to fewer goals, and that the team's seemingly endless passing was in fact boring, with Rob Smyth of The Guardian dubbing it "Tiki-takanaccio," a reference to the defensive–minded catenaccio tactical system.

In a 2013 interview with La Gazzetta dello Sport, Spain and Barcelona defender Gerard Piqué admitted that he felt that Barcelona had become predictable in the way they played as a result of being overly dependent on tiki-taka, stating: "We played the last few years with homegrown coaches, first Pep and then Tito, and maybe we ended up exasperating our style of play to the extent that we found ourselves slaves to that system, that style. Now that Tata, who comes from outside the club, has arrived, and who shares the same ideas of football, which are based on possession, he is, however, showing us different options. It's very positive because it gives us variety. When we are being pressed, sending the ball long a few times is not negative; it helps you mix things up, giving you oxygen and preventing us from getting crushed with no way out. We have started pressing far up the field again, winning back possession in the final third of the field and, from there, it's far easier to create chances without having to build up from right at the back, particularly against sides who close up a lot. It's normal to try to develop new ideas and variations. After many years, our opponents obviously knew how we attacked, how we moved. Look at Alves and Alba, for example. They push a lot and some opponents would give them space down the wing, but not let them move inside. It became difficult to get in. We needed to find alternative solutions and Tata's doing that without ruining our style – we still have the same possession. We needed variations like this."

Although Pep Guardiola is known for adopting a tiki-taka-inspired playing style with his teams, in 2014 he was dismissive of the use of the particular label being applied to describe his teams' playing styles; moreover, he himself was critical of a possession–based strategy with little attacking intent, stating: "I loathe all that passing for the sake of it, all that tiki-taka. It's so much rubbish and has no purpose. You have to pass the ball with a clear intention, with the aim of making it into the opposition's goal. It's not about passing for the sake of it. Don't believe what people say. Barça didn't do tiki-taka! It's completely made up! Don't believe a word of it! In all team sports, the secret is to overload one side of the pitch so that the opponent must tilt its own defence to cope. You overload on one side and draw them in so that they leave the other side weak."

In 2017, Italian defender Giorgio Chiellini expressed his belief that the popularisation of the attack–minded tiki-taka playing style, associated with the Spain national side and Barcelona under Guardiola, and the increasing focus on developing defenders who are comfortable with the ball at their feet from a young age, had in fact had a negative impact on their overall defensive quality, and Italian football's ability to produce top defenders in particular, stating: "Guardiolismo [a term he coined for "the Guardiola way"] has ruined a generation of Italian defenders a bit – now everyone is looking to push up, defenders know how to set the tone of play and they can spread the ball, but they don't know how to mark. Unfortunately, that's the way it is. When I was young, we used to do drills to get a feel for the man you were marking. Nowadays, from crosses, Italian defenders – and I can only really talk for Italian defenders, I am only relatively interested about foreign players – don't mark their man. It's a great pity because we're losing our DNA a bit and some of those characteristics which had made us excel in the world. Now, we need talented players up front, but we also need to bring somebody through in defence because we are never going to be able to play Spain's tiki-taka because it's not part of our philosophy."

Similarly, in 2019, Italian goalkeeper Gianluigi Buffon expressed mixed views regarding goalkeepers being given more responsibilities with the ball at their feet, as well as the fact that keepers were being increasingly judged by scouts more on their ball skills than their goalkeeping ability, stating: "Today there is this great – in my opinion, exaggerated – focus on how keepers play the ball with their feet; how they need to pass and move with their other team-mates. I myself, ever since I was a kid, was an atypical goalkeeper. I often had this role of being a 'libero', playing with my feet a lot. At times, honestly, I did it in an excessive way. Despite that, I maintain one thing: if you lose that true attention, that sincere focus on being a good goalkeeper – which means stopping shots, knowing how to come out for a high ball, understanding how you approach a low ball as you come off your line – then, for me, you’re being asked to totally go against your natural role." He also added: "You see goalkeepers today who are much better than their peers, but wind up getting overlooked in favour of someone else who can play three tidy passes. If you ask me, I would say that every great team – or at least the teams that have won – has always had a great keeper who knows how to make saves first of all. After that, if they can do things with their feet then sure, that is even better."

== History of countering tiki-taka ==
The high-profile success of tiki-taka as practiced by Barcelona and the Spain national team in the late 2000s led to a variety of tactics and formations designed to contain and counter the system's domination of ball possession.

=== 2008–2009 season ===
Guardiola's Barcelona faced 52 different teams and managed wins against all of them except Chelsea. During the 2009 Champions League semi-finals, Chelsea, who were managed by Guus Hiddink, used a solid, compact, and communicating defence to force Barça to shoot outside the penalty area as well as having defender José Bosingwa, helped by centre-back John Terry and defensive midfielder Michael Essien, man-mark Lionel Messi. This worked as the first leg was a 0–0 draw at the Camp Nou. The draw ensured Chelsea were the first visiting team that season to keep a clean sheet in Barça's home stadium. In a controversial second leg match with Chelsea calling for up to four penalties, Chelsea were up 1–0 until Andrés Iniesta scored in stoppage time to level the tie at 1–1 and let Barça advance on away goals.

=== 2009 FIFA Confederations Cup ===
The first team to defeat the Spain national team in a tournament during the tiki-taka era was the United States, who eliminated Spain with a 2–0 victory in the semi-finals of the 2009 FIFA Confederations Cup. USA coach Bob Bradley used a narrow and deep 4–4–2 designed to force Spain's possession to wide areas and draw Spain's defence out of shape, creating space for counter-attacks that resulted in goals for Jozy Altidore and Clint Dempsey.

=== 2009–2010 season ===
In the 2010 semi-finals of the Champions League, José Mourinho's Internazionale players denied Barça space as they double-marked Messi and prevented Xavi from achieving a successful passing rhythm. Inter won the first leg 3–1, and then lost 0–1 to advance on aggregate 3–2. Mourinho would become manager of Real Madrid the next season and employ similar tactics, resulting in a bitter domestic rivalry with Guardiola over the following two years.

=== 2010 FIFA World Cup ===
In their opening game of the 2010 World Cup, Spain suffered a 1–0 loss to Switzerland. Following the match, Switzerland's manager Ottmar Hitzfeld admitted that he had been influenced by United States coach Bob Bradley's tactics from the Confederations Cup's match between the USA and Spain.

=== 2011–2012 season ===
Chelsea manager Roberto Di Matteo succeeded in countering tiki-taka when his team met Barça in the semi-finals of the 2011–12 UEFA Champions League. According to Chelsea's Fernando Torres, concentrating on space rather than trying to steal the ball was part of his squad's strategy to counter Barça. Winning battles on the wings, such as Ramires against Dani Alves, would force Barça to funnel their attacks toward the centre of the field. Former Chelsea winger Pat Nevin noted that stationing three disciplined midfielders in front of the back four defenders denied Barça space, forcing Lionel Messi to withdraw deeper and narrower to get to the ball (as Messi was high on the pitch, he was stripped of the ball by Chelsea's Frank Lampard, which led to a goal for Chelsea in the first leg). During the second leg, Di Matteo deployed a 4–5–1 formation with a very compact midfield structure. While Barça enjoyed 73% of ball possession over the two legs and 46 shots to Chelsea's 12 (11 of these shots on target versus Chelsea's four), by contrast, Chelsea's Frank Lampard completed two telling passes in the two legs; both of them leading to goals. It has been suggested that Barça's weakness offensively is winning balls in the air, especially against a team like Chelsea that has the size and strength to control balls in the box. Chelsea achieved a 1–0 victory in the first leg and a 2–2 tie in the second to overcome Barça.

=== 2012–2013 season ===
The next season, Barcelona faced Massimiliano Allegri's A.C. Milan in the Champions League round of 16. In the first leg at the San Siro, Milan employed a very narrow 4–4–2 formation, with Stephan El Shaarawy acting both as a second striker and a fifth midfielder, ready to break in behind Dani Alves, and Sulley Muntari closely man-marking Xavi in the center. Thus, Barcelona had only one chance on goal and ended up losing 2–0. In the second leg, Barca changed their formation to what was effectively a 3–3–1–3, with David Villa in a centre-forward role, allowing Messi space between the lines and completely demolishing Milan's shape, ending in a 4–0 Barcelona victory.

Later in the same season, tiki-taka's vulnerability was exposed when Bayern Munich defeated Barça 4–0 in the 2012–13 Champions League semi-finals and 3–0 in the return leg. Bayern head coach Jupp Heynckes had built upon his predecessor Louis van Gaal's foundations by making the team more defensively balanced, while replacing Van Gaal's "positional football"—in which everyone had to stick to their specific space on the pitch when attacking the opposition goal—with a much more fluid and attacking style that gave the forwards freedom to roam and swap. In the first leg, Barça enjoyed 63% possession but Bayern had 11 corners to Barcelona's four, and had nine shots on goal to Barça's one. Bayern's Bastian Schweinsteiger and Javi Martínez held a compact midfield that played crucial roles in shutting down Barcelona's Xavi's and Andrés Iniesta's attempts to pass forward at midfield, while Arjen Robben and Franck Ribéry proved effective on the wings.

Bayern's first-half tactics involved "fake pressing", pushing close to their markers in possession to drive Barça away from danger areas with sheer presence, while conserving their energy by not committing themselves, keeping Bayern's players fresh enough for the second half to mount attacks. Though they had managed to outscore lesser opponents, Barcelona's defense was vulnerable, as the absence of center-backs Carles Puyol and Javier Mascherano robbed the team of physical presence to guard against set pieces which Bayern exploited. The Guardian proclaimed that "some suggested Bayern would attempt to outplay Barcelona at short passing football, but ultimately it was a perfect recipe of Barcelona's traditional problems: set pieces, counterattacks and physicality, that will lead many to suggest the balance of power has shifted from Catalonia to Bavaria."

=== 2013 FIFA Confederations Cup ===
Tiki-taka was again exposed when Brazil defeated Spain 3–0 in the 2013 Confederations Cup final, ending Spain's run of 29 unbeaten matches in competitive football. The ball possession was 47% for Brazil and 53% for Spain, with two goals conceded in the first half of the match.

=== 2013–2014 season ===
Diego Simeone's Atlético Madrid faced Barcelona six times in the 2013–14 season, managing to remain undefeated in all six matches. Simeone utilized a 4–4–1–1 formation, with Gabi and Tiago as the defensive midfielders, Koke and Arda Turan acting more like inside-midfielders than traditional wingers, Raul García or David Villa often dropping deep to join the midfield and Diego Costa as the lone striker up-front. In this formation, Simeone denied Barcelona their vital space in the midfield, rendering tiki-taka tactics useless against Atlético. Atlético also relied on their height advantage over the Barça players, with centre-backs Diego Godín and Miranda intercepting all Barcelona long-balls and often going forward when Atlético took a corner kick or free-kick. It is no coincidence that Godín scored Atlético's goal in the last league match against Barcelona, a header from a corner-kick, to give Simeone's team the league title. Atlético also managed to eliminate Barcelona from the Champions League relying on these tactics.

Carlo Ancelotti's Real Madrid relied on positioning to force Pep Guardiola's Bayern Munich to defeat in the first semi-final leg of the 2013–14 UEFA Champions League at the Santiago Bernabéu. Bayern, practicing a form of tiki-taka, pressed high in attack but was vulnerable in defence. Real Madrid's players strictly kept their positions when defending, and managed to score on a counter-attack, winning the first game 1–0. In the second leg in Munich, Bayern's defences were even more vulnerable, and Real Madrid managed a resounding 4–0 victory, their first ever away victory against Bayern, eliminating the Champions League holders.

=== 2014 FIFA World Cup ===
In the 2014 World Cup, Dutch manager Louis van Gaal deployed a 5–3–2 formation against Spain in the first match of the group stage. This formation had Robin van Persie and Arjen Robben as strikers, a three-man midfield assisted by wing-backs Daryl Janmaat and Daley Blind and a three-man defence. Spain managed to open the score from a controversial penalty won by Diego Costa and converted by Xabi Alonso, but the swift counter-attacks of the Netherlands proved highly effective in the rest of the match, resulting in a 5–1 victory for the Dutch, topped off by Robin van Persie's "flying dutchman" masterpiece, the worst defeat for Spain in 64 years. It is noteworthy that Van Gaal was the manager of Barcelona in the 2002–03 season, the man mainly responsible for bringing up Xavi and Andrés Iniesta, who went on to become basic elements of Barcelona and Spain's tiki-taka style.

In the second match of the group stage, Chile under Jorge Sampaoli used a fluidly-changing 3–4–3 formation, evolving into a 5–3–2 when defending, and having their three central midfielders man-mark Spain's three central midfielders (Marcelo Díaz on David Silva, Charles Aránguiz on Xabi Alonso and Arturo Vidal on Sergio Busquets), a tactic previously used by influential coach Marcelo Bielsa. Chile managed to score twice in the first half, and Spain were unable to breach their opponents five-man defence, exiting the World Cup in the group stage. Spain's disastrous 2014 World Cup, along with Barcelona's move to a more direct style under managers Gerardo Martino and Luis Enrique, have marked the end of tiki-taka.

=== UEFA Euro 2016 ===
Following a successful qualifying campaign, a rejuvenated Spain entered UEFA Euro 2016 with a majority of the team's golden generation still intact, along with a new wave of attacking players such as Nolito and Álvaro Morata leading the line. La Roja's opening two group games against the Czech Republic and Turkey both resulted in convincing 1–0 and 3–0 wins respectively. With the new generation of attacking talent combining with the tiki-taka style of play of the remaining players from the golden generation, Spain quickly became unanimous favourites for the tournament by the media, and with two wins from their first two group games, Spain look set to win their group, giving them the luxury of not having to play a group winner until the semi-final round going into their final group game against second-placed Croatia. Thanks to the Croatians' effective exploitation of Spain's vulnerability to the counter-attack, Spain lost their final group game 2–1, despite having taken an early lead through Alvaro Morata, which was canceled out by a goal later in the half from Nikola Kalinić, followed by a last-gasp winner from Ivan Perišić. As a result, Spain finished runners-up in their group behind Croatia, setting them up for a rematch of their Euro 2012 final with Italy. Despite being the favourites, Spain were caught off guard by Italy's uncharacteristically aggressive attacking play in the first half, as Italy took the lead just after the half-hour mark, with Giorgio Chiellini putting away a rebound from an Italian free-kick. Spain began to regain more ball possession and began to push for an equalizer in the second half, but the Italians' strong defense repeatedly repelled Spain's attack. Spain also lacked enough space in the midfield to create any decent chances due to Italian coach Antonio Conte's usage of a 3–5–2 formation, with Italy's superior numbers in the midfield allowing Italy to create multiple scoring opportunities on the counter-attack that was previously exploited by Croatia. Italy ultimately scored another goal in added time through Graziano Pellè, securing the win for Italy.

== See also ==
- Golden Team
- Total Football
- Football tactics and skills
- Formation
- Spain national football team
- Barcelona
- Football Skills
- Barcelona - Dream Team
- Lionel Messi
