= Total Football =

Playing style in association football

Total football (Dutch: totaalvoetbal) is a tactical system in association football in which any outfield player can take over the role of any other player in a team. A player who moves out of his position is replaced by another from his team, thus retaining the team's intended organizational structure. In this fluid system, no outfield player is fixed in a predetermined role; anyone can successively play as an attacker, a midfielder and a defender.

Total football's tactical success depends largely on the adaptability of each player in the team, and in particular their ability to quickly switch positions depending on the on-field situation. The theory requires players to be comfortable in multiple positions; hence, it requires intelligent players with many skills.

Manager Rinus Michels is generally credited with introducing this system during the 1970s, at Dutch club Ajax and the Netherlands national team. However, some authors credit teams such as the Austrian Wunderteam of the 1930s or the Golden Team of Hungary of the 1950s for having played in a similar style to Total Football. Both sides were influenced by Jimmy Hogan, who was in turn influenced by the combination game.

== History ==
=== Pre-1970s ===
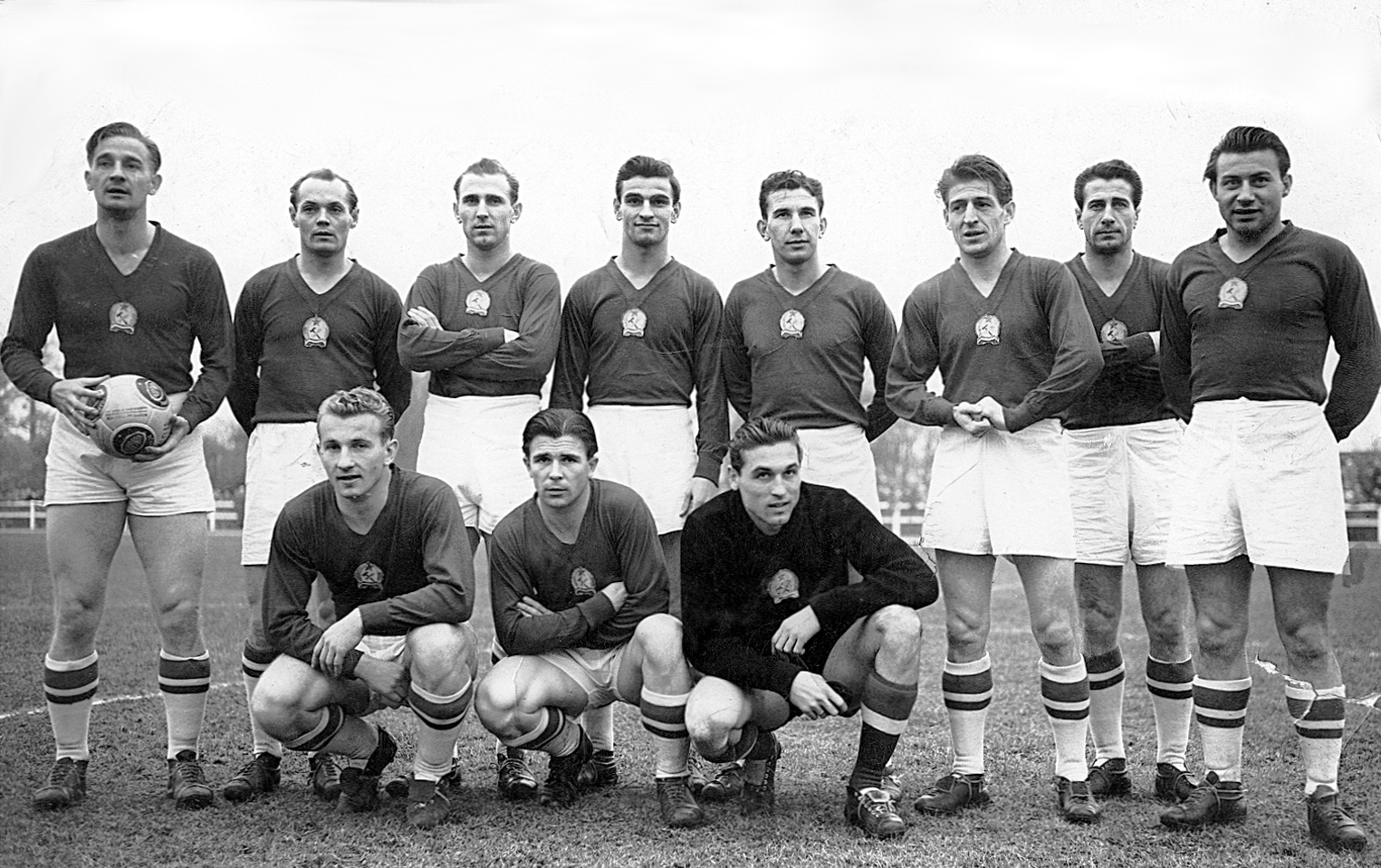
The Golden Team (Mighty Magyars) in 1953

The first foundations for what became known as Total Football were laid by Jimmy Hogan, a Burnley native, who was influenced by the combination game. Working with Austrian coach and his friend Hugo Meisl in the early 1930s, Meisl's Austria national football team (known as the "Wunderteam") became possibly the first side to play Total Football. Hogan's influence reached beyond the Austrian borders, as two decades later the Hungary national team (also known as the "Golden Team") played a similar style of football under coach Gusztáv Sebes. The then president of the Hungarian Football Association, Sandor Barcs, said: "Jimmy Hogan taught us everything we know about football".

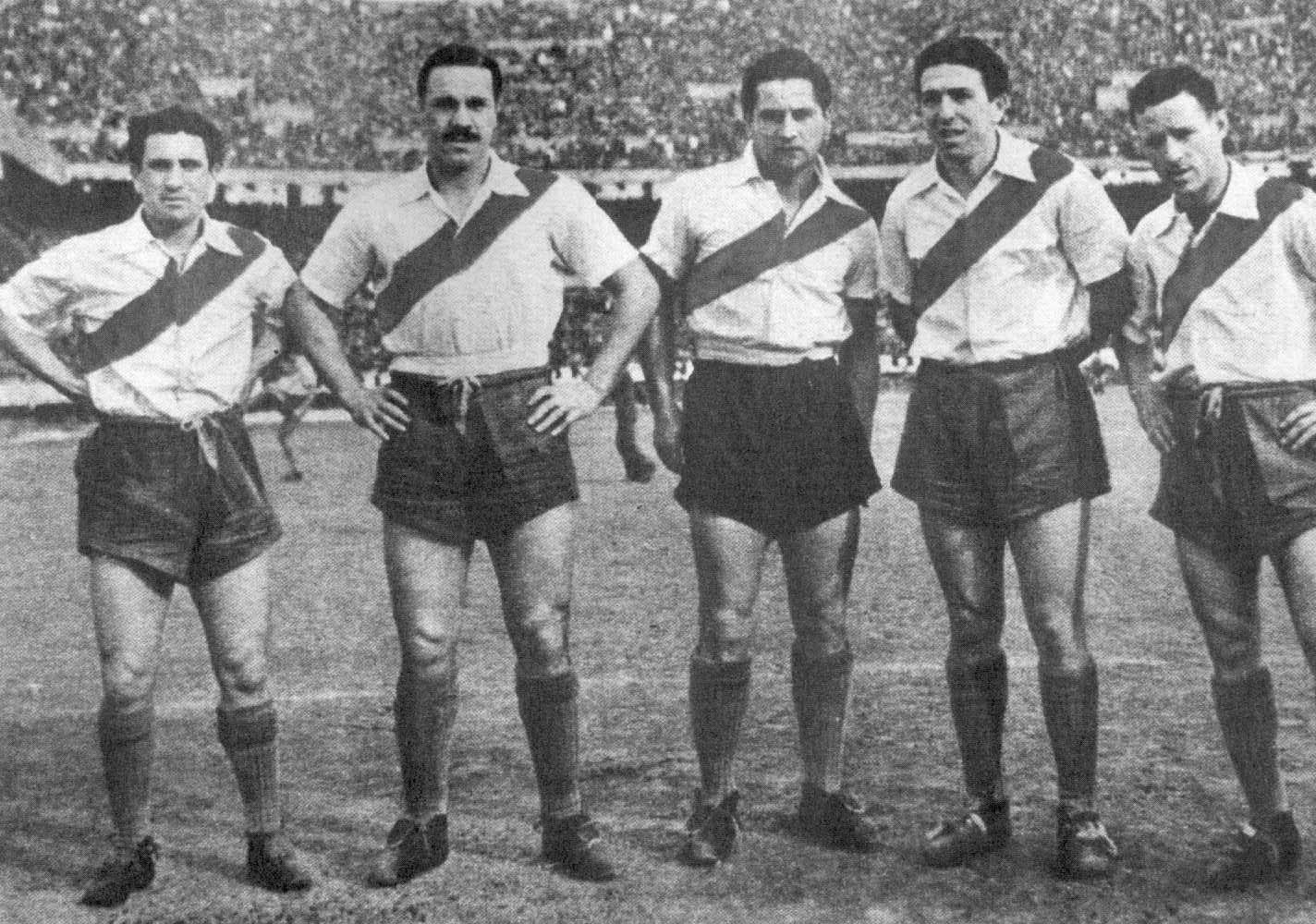
La Máquina, nickname of Argentine team River Plate in the 1940s

Torino ("Grande Torino" as the team was called) in the 1940s played a similar style as the Austrians. Between 1941 and 1947, Argentinian club River Plate formed a remarkable team, known as "La Máquina" (The Machine), whose attack formed by Carlos Muñoz, José Manuel Moreno, Adolfo Pedernera, Ángel Labruna and Félix Loustau perfected the "false nine" style and the constant change of attack positions. "La Máquina" won several Argentine and international titles.

Also in the 1940s, English manager Jack Reynolds implemented a style that was bearing similarities to Total Football at Ajax, leading the Dutch club to rise in importance and win trophies for the first time. In the late 1950s and early 1960s, Burnley were playing a renewed system in English football "where every player could play in every position" under manager Harry Potts. This Total Football system led the club to the 1959–60 First Division title and won many plaudits, including admiration from all-time English First Division top scorer Jimmy Greaves. Another pioneer was Vic Buckingham, manager of West Bromwich Albion, Ajax and Barcelona in the 1950s and 1960s, as the footballing education that he established helped the progressive nature of the type of football of Rinus Michels and later Johan Cruyff, a player who was introduced into the Ajax first team by Vic Buckingham.

=== Totaalvoetbal schools ===
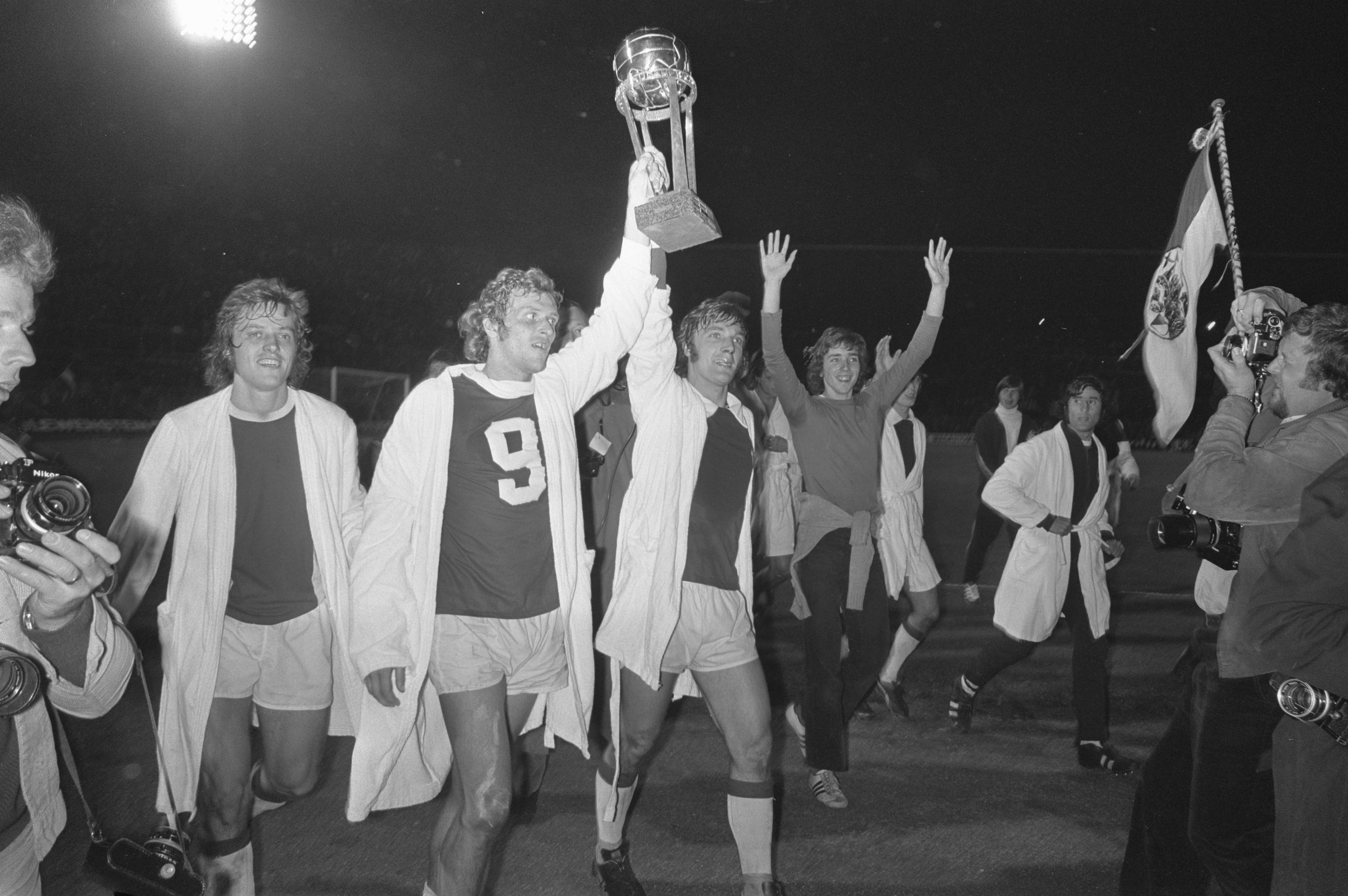
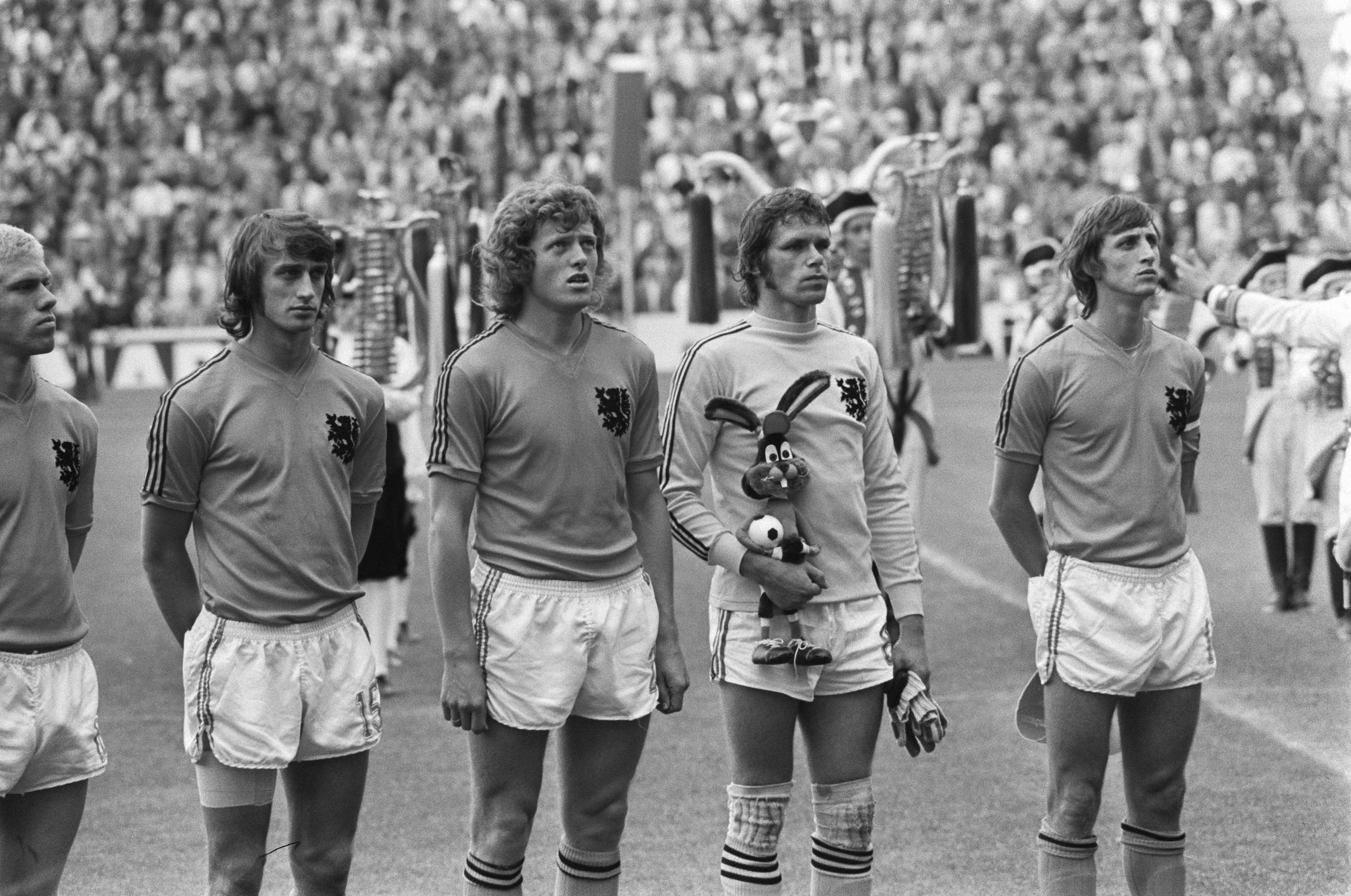
Two Dutch exponents of total football in early 1970s, with Johan Cruyff being a keyplayer for both teams: AFC Ajax celebrating the Intercontinental Cup in 1972 (left); the Netherlands national team before playing Germany at the 1974 World Cup (right)

Rinus Michels, who played under Reynolds, later became manager of Ajax in 1965. Michels developed the tactics of Total Football after 1970, most importantly with the introduction of forward Johan Cruyff, perhaps the system's most famous exponent. Although Cruyff was fielded as centre forward, Michels encouraged Cruyff to roam freely around the pitch, using technical ability and intelligence to exploit the weaknesses in the opposition and create chances. Cruyff's teammates also worked to adapt themselves accordingly, regularly switching positions to ensure tactical roles in the team were consistently filled. Austrian coach Ernst Happel reworked the theory to introduce strength, encouraging his players to play tougher during his spells at ADO Den Haag and Feyenoord. Happel also managed the Netherlands national team to a runner-up finish in the 1978 FIFA World Cup.

The major component was the use of space, with the need to consistently create space central to the concept of Total Football. Former Ajax defender Barry Hulshoff described it as "[the thing] we discussed the whole time. Cruyff always talked about where to run and where to stand, and when not to move". He further elaborated that position switching was only made possible due to apt spatial awareness. He also described Total Football being proactive, as well as highlighting the use of pressing, which would be used to win back the ball or put the opposition under considerable pressure. Michels and Cruyff saw unprecedented success with the system, winning eight Eredivisie titles, three European Cups, and one Intercontinental Cup. The stark rise of Total Football and its attacking prowess was also linked with the "death of Catenaccio", an Italian system reliant heavily on defence promoted by Helenio Herrera's Inter Milan during the 1960s.

The Total Football system was prone to defeat, experienced notably in the final of the 1974 FIFA World Cup contested by the Dutch and West Germany. Michels and Cruyff saw their ability to introduce playmaking stifled in the second half of the match by the effective marking of Berti Vogts. This allowed Franz Beckenbauer, Uli Hoeneß, and Wolfgang Overath to gain a stronghold in midfield, thus, enabling West Germany to win 2–1.

=== Modern era ===
Building further on the foundations of Total Football, a new tactical system developed in FC Barcelona (particularly under manager Pep Guardiola) and the Spain national team during the late 2000s and early 2010s. This came to be known as Juego de Posición or Tiki-taka.

== See also ==
- Anti-football
- Association football tactics and skills
- Formation (association football)
