= Association football tactics =

Notable football skills and tactics

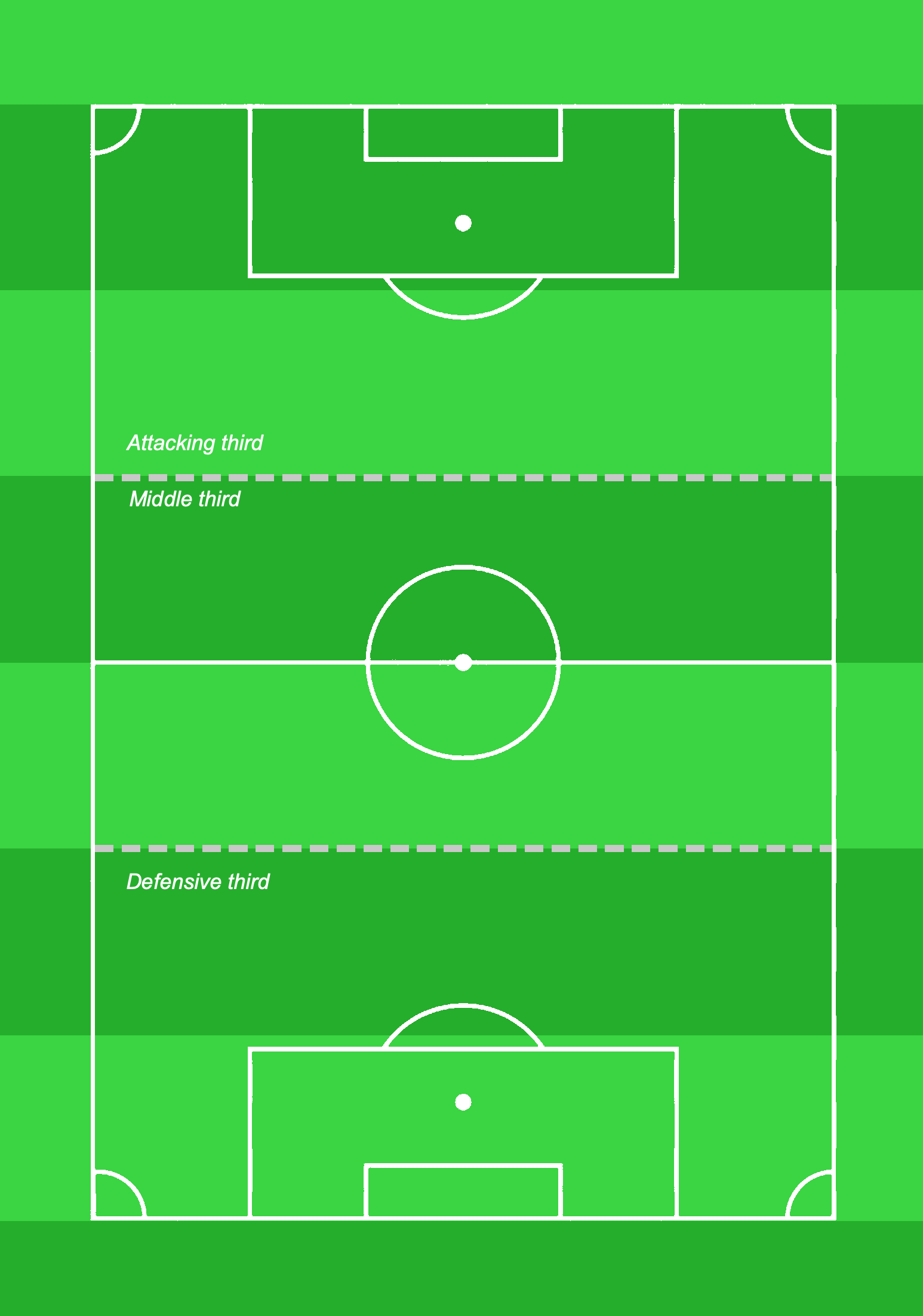
An association football pitch is in tactical terms often divided into thirds of 35 metres each, given standard size of pitch, so as to reference the three different stages of play.

Team tactics are integral for playing association football. In theory, association football is a simple sport, as illustrated by Kevin Keegan's assertion that his tactics for winning a match were to "score more goals than the opposition." Despite this, tactical prowess within the sport is one of the manager's key responsibilities and also why many are paid well, as well-organised teams can often win with less skillful players.

Association football teams consist of ten outfield players and one goalkeeper, which makes passing an integral part of the game. In terms of complexity, lower levels of the game such as youth, amateur, and semi-professional, primarily focus on fundamentals, whereas professionals often increase detail and complexity in their strategies.

== General principles ==
Width and depth are major principles of both offence and defence:

- Width in attack: The attacking side tries to divide the defence by diversifying points of attack across a broad front, rather than attempting to force advances through narrow channels. This may involve play from the wings, or rapid shifting into open lanes/open space when approaching the goal. Often gaps are made between defenders using the width of wingers. Gaps can then be used to feed the ball to strikers.
- Width in defence: The defending side responds, either through increasing width or strong side tilt, in an attempt to contract and deny width. Attackers are "shepherded" or channeled into narrower or more crowded avenues of space.
- Depth in attack: The attacking side uses the depth of the pitch by moving men either up from the rear, or down from the top, but may use a constant "target striker" or front man to always invoke a presence deep in the defence.
- Depth in defence: The defending side also uses depth by marking the supporting players of the opposing team, and holding a man back as cover for elevated opposing players, sometimes in a "sweeper" or "libero" role. The attacking player with the ball will have trouble finding anyone open for a pass. Defenders may alternatively abandon depth temporarily to set an offside trap.
- Balance in defence: The defending side attempts a balanced coverage of space. Defenders do not simply cluster on the right side for example, just because the ball is there at that time.

=== Substitutions ===
In FIFA 11-a-side competitive fixtures, teams are allowed to substitute up to five players during games. The rules of the competition state that all players and substitutes shall be named before kick-off and anyone not named in the starting lineup who takes to the field of play is considered a substitution. In non-competitive matches, the use of substitutes must be determined before the match begins, except in friendly international matches, where the amount of substitutes that may be brought on is only limited by the amount of a) substitution windows and b) amount of substitutes on the bench (the rules previously stated that in international friendlies only six substitutes are allowed).

The most tired players are generally substituted, but only if their substitutes are well trained to fill in the same role, or if the formation is transformed at the same time to accommodate for the substitution.

Coaches often refrain from substituting defensive players in order not to disrupt the defensive posture of the team. Instead, they often replace ineffective attackers or unimaginative midfielders in order to freshen up the attacking posture and increase their chances of scoring.

For a team that is losing a game, a fresh striker can bring more benefit in circumventing an opposed defence line composed of relatively tired players. For a team that is winning a game, a fresh midfielder or a defender can bring more benefit in strengthening the defence against the opposition's attackers (who may be fresh substitutes themselves). In this situation, for the winning team, it is usually imaginative attacking flair players who are replaced by tough-tackling defensive midfielders or defenders.

Injured players may also need to be substituted. For each injured player who must be substituted, the team loses one more opportunity to influence things later in the game to their favour.

== Attacking tactics ==
One consideration that teams have to make when in possession of the ball, is what degree of risk-taking to impose on attack. Playing with lower margins may constitute higher reward, but is also associated with higher risks, as defensive sides can exploit transitions to their favour with a counter-attacking style of play. Higher margins means more security in ball control, but may also lead to longer periods of play without creating scoring chances. Association football offense requires high levels of anticipation skills in all its participating players, as many decisions have to be made before the actual attacking play is made.

=== Attacking ===
- Pass and move: Having the ball in their possession, the player needs to choose quickly whether to pass it or not. If they do not pass it immediately, they need to move with it; if they do pass it, they again need to move along, following the general ball movement. This can also be used to mean that once a player has passed the ball he does not remain stationary but moves into a position where he can receive the ball again and give more options to the player in possession. The aim is to create a forward motion by moving the ball across areas where the defence are not (easily) able to create any momentum for themselves.
- Give and go: Essentially a type of "pass and move", and an essential part of the "target man" style of play (see below). The player in possession of the ball plays a pass to a teammate and then immediately seeks to move into free space. If the passer can "lose" their defensive marker (either through pace, movement, superior fitness or a lack of awareness on the part of the defender) they are then free to receive a return pass and advance towards the goal and possibly create (or finish) a scoring chance. When the ball is immediately returned to the first player this is known as a "one-two" (in British parlance). A version of this play involving a through ball into space as a return to the initial passer (known as a wall pass) is sometimes used to get past the first level of defence (for example).

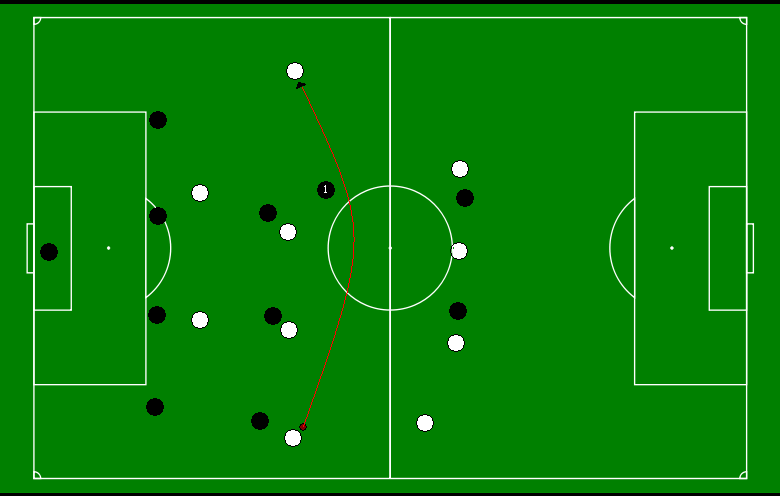
Ex. 1 - Switching sides

- Switching sides: The use of a square or cross pass across the width of the pitch to a player on the far side is an effective option for relieving pressure and opening up spaces for the attack. The defending team will have to adjust their positions and this normally opens up space that may be exploited. In this example, the player numbered 1 has moved out of position, allowing more space for the opposing player. By playing the ball to the other side (the curved line represents an aerial pass), the recipient of the pass finds themselves in open space. (See Ex. 1)
- Through ball (slide-rule pass): Starts with space identified behind the opponent's defensive line. Passes into this area have a number of upsides: If an attacking player manages to receive the pass while onside, the player may end up with a 1-on-1 opportunity with the goalkeeper, or otherwise be in an advanced position for a wide attack. If a defender intercepts the pass, the outcome could still be good for the attacking team, as they are in a situation near the goal line, which could lead to a corner, a throw in or a turnover. Typically, teams with fast attacking players will try challenging this space. If the opposing team has a slower defence, this may prompt them to keep a rather low back line.

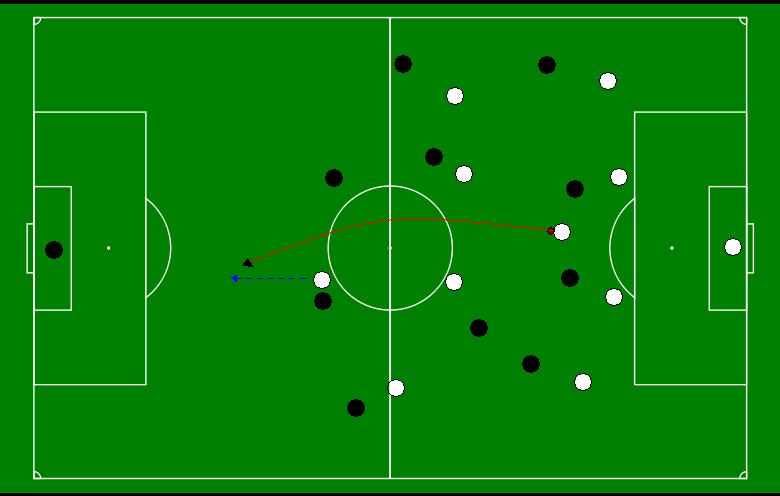
Ex. 2 - The long through ball

- Long through ball: A deep and oftentimes aerial pass from a team's own half or the start of the opposing side's half, intended to go over the heads of the other team's defence. It is meant for the attacking players to chase and therefore they must remain in an onside position until the ball is kicked. The tactic works well with strong and fast forwards who have a good ability to control the ball and create a scoring chance. (See Ex. 2)
- Passing at the back: This tactic is commonly used at the own half (if opponent pressure is imminent and the side which is in control of the ball seeks to calm down the play) so as to gain momentum for a new attempt to attack or just to retain ball possession in the course of a favourable score in the game. With the aim of keeping the ball in control, this tactic involves three, four or five defenders where the full backs normally are positioned slightly higher than the centre halves. This strategy is at times referred to as time-wasting if the ball controlling side isn't actively looking to initiate an attack. Recent tactical analysis confirms that structured play building and team positioning significantly improve the dynamics of collective ball control indicators during match play.
- Triangular play: A subtype of the give-and-go tactic; allows for a safe and quick movement of various areas in play whilst maintaining control of the ball. In a triangular play the ball is passed between three players to form a triangle. The triangle is then shifted to a different position when a new player is added. Many triangles can be created with various combinations of players with the intent to incrementally move the ball forward without compromising possession. This tactic is common when trying to gain control of the midfield. However it may also be used for (final 3rd) attacking purposes.
- Swapping wings: Having two available and positionally flexible wide men at their disposal, a coach might let them interchange positions in the course of a game. The intent is to disarrange opponents assigned to them, possibly leading to opportunities as the opponents try to find their players to cover. Also, if the wingers have different playing styles (one favouring crossing from deep positions whilst the other is prone to trying to dribble past their marker for example), it is a way to take advantage of a weakness in the opponent's coverage. If the wingers have a different foot preference (meaning one is left-footed and the other is right-footed), swapping sides may make for some interesting attacking movement.
- In the space between the opponent's defensive line and midfield line (the "hole"): A common strategy of attack is to pass (or move) the ball into the spaces between the opponent's defenders and midfielders. If a pass is made, a midfielder in an advanced position or an attacker in a deeper position will want to receive the ball right between the lines of the opponent. A player can also try to move the ball into this area on their own, at which point they may look for a passing option; alternatively attempting to create a good scoring chance on their own.
- Strong side overloads: Attacking teams may pressure the defence on to one side of the pitch by moving most of its attackers and midfielders to the ball side while letting a wing player or defender come to the opposite side with little or no coverage. By compressing space in the areas where the ball is, the defence has to respect the strong side threat by adding extra players into the mix. The ball is then crossed or passed into an unmarked area on the far side of the pitch for a free or near free shot, dribble or pass.
- Target man: The implied use of a quality striker who has the ability to take on the whole defence on their own - and will often occupy two defenders - making the defence vulnerable. Complemented with two fast wingers, this tactic may give the 4-man defence potential problems. Teams may also benefit from a target man at set pieces.
- Counter-attack: This strategy involves the use of a fast-paced attack, often immediately following a defensive transition of the ball. It could also refer to attacking in situations where the defensive coverage of the opponents have made a mistake by leaving (wide) spaces open to attack. This strategy requires fast players with good split-vision and quick thinking, as the ball is to transfer large distances of the field in a matter of seconds. Forwards will try to position themselves in open spaces either in or near the penalty box for a quick finish upon receiving the ball.
- Cross into the box: A player (often a winger, wide midfielder or fullback) situated outside the width of the penalty box (on one of the flanks) attempts a cross into the penalty box, for a teammate (usually a striker, or a forward) to try to score on (with a header, a volley, or a one touch shot). Crosses into the box can be of various height and length and target various areas of the penalty box. For this to work, the player attempting the cross needs to be skilled at performing this type of pass, as well as able to read the game of play, and the receiving target has to have a number of competitive advantages (such as height, strength, speed or heading skills) in order to beat the defence for the attempt at goal.

=== Lanes of play ===
In general there are three lanes of play - left, right and middle. The left and right lanes are also referred to as "flanks", and attacking in these two channels doesn't differ very much, except for the possible necessity for left-footed players on the left flank, for the purpose of crossing for example. The middle lane is a bit different, as it is the central lane of play, and also where the goal is. It necessitates attentive players who can cut through defensive lines with passes or play-moves that either vertically or diagonally ask questions to the stability and integrity of defence.

When making runs across the pitch in offense, whether horizontal, diagonal or vertical, these run lanes need to be a coordinated team effort, as one outfield player or even a part of the team (such as the midfield) need to trust other outfield players to cover for them when making these runs. In that way, the offensive game becomes a matter of balancing the optimism shown by forward runs with cautiousness in having players covering for them. This accounts for runs both on and off the ball.

==== Corridors ====
Sometimes teams tactically divide the pitch horizontally into five corridors instead: Outside left, inside left, central, inside right and outside right. This is among other things reflected in the positional names being used in formations with five midfielders, or five defenders.

=== Set pieces ===
==== Free kicks ====
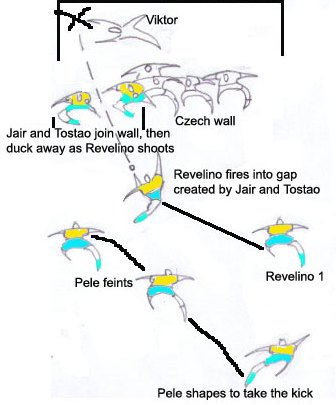
Free kick trickery at work - 1970 - Brasil vs Czechoslovakia: Jairzinho and Tostao of Brasil join the end of the defensive wall, then move off as Rivellino's powerful shot strikes through the gap.

Free kicks are a part of play following a foul or other infraction. Indirect free kicks must be touched by a second player before a goal can be scored, while direct free kicks can be made scored directly. If the free kick is close to goal (within 35-40 yards), the defensive side will often form a "wall" of two or more players in order to block the (expected) shot. In this case, the free kick taker may attempt tricks to beat the defenders. Attackers may attempt to blast the ball through or curl it over or around the wall. A less common trick is to kick the ball along the floor, since the defenders in the wall often jump to try to prevent a shot being curled over them. However, this tactic has become less effective in the modern game, as defending teams usually assign one player to lie down behind the wall to block any low attempts.

If the free kick is close-range but in a less-than-ideal angle to attempt to take a shot on goal, a common method of creating a scoring chance is to cross the ball into the penalty area, usually aiming for a spot in the angle towards the penalty spot, at which attacking players will try to beat defending players to the ball in order for a header or volleyball shot to hit the target. This is common to a corner kick.

==== Throw-ins ====
How throw-ins are best handled depends on where it is:

- In one's own half the aim of a throw-in may be to retain possession in order to build up the next attack. The throw may or may not go toward the opponents' goal; the most unmarked player may be a full-back who is behind the ball. Such a throw followed by a quickly taken 'switch' pass can be an effective tactic. Under pressure however, the ball is often thrown up the line, toward the opponents' goal line to gain as much ground as possible.
- If the thrower is unmarked, a simple tactic is to take a short throw to the feet or chest of a marked player who immediately returns the ball to the thrower.
- In the last third of the pitch a player with a long throw can put pressure onto the defenders by throwing the ball deep into the opponents' penalty area, resulting in somewhat similar tactics to a corner kick or a free kick situation, but with the added advantage of avoiding the offside trap that could be used by opponents in a free kick, as an attacking player cannot be offside from a throw in (the same applies for corner kicks).

==== Goal kicks ====
A goal kick is an important 'set piece' that will occur many times in a game. If taken quickly the kick may be taken short to a full-back who has run into a wide position. Although this may gain little ground it retains the all-important possession of the ball. A longer kick to the midfield is more common and it is vital that the midfield unit are in a position to receive it. Some goalkeepers may take advantage of no offside rule while taking a Goal Kick to quickly pass the ball to a striker while the opposite team is still repositioning.

==== Corners ====
A corner kick (or "corner") is a goal scoring opportunity and it is essential to know who is the best at taking a good corner from both the left and right side of the pitch. A good corner will be aimed high across the goal and may be 'bent' towards or away from the goal. At least one of the forwards should be on or close to the goal line when the kick is taken.

Another tactic on a corner is to let the best shooter stay in the back "trash" position and have the defence worried about those up front. The player taking the corner kick makes a small pass back to the trash shooter who has time and space to take a good shot.

== Defensive tactics ==
All the outfield players on the field are assigned defensive roles of which depend to an extent upon tactics. In principle, there are two ways of defending, zone and man-to-man. In a zone defence, defensive players mainly move in synchronicity with teammates, whereas in a man-to-man defence players mainly move in relation to opposing players. Hybrids of these two often occur when defensive players have a larger degree of freedom tactically. Another consideration for defensive tactics is pressure width; to what extent teams will let players approach the sidelines when pressing wide as contrasted to staying central.

=== First, second and third defenders ===
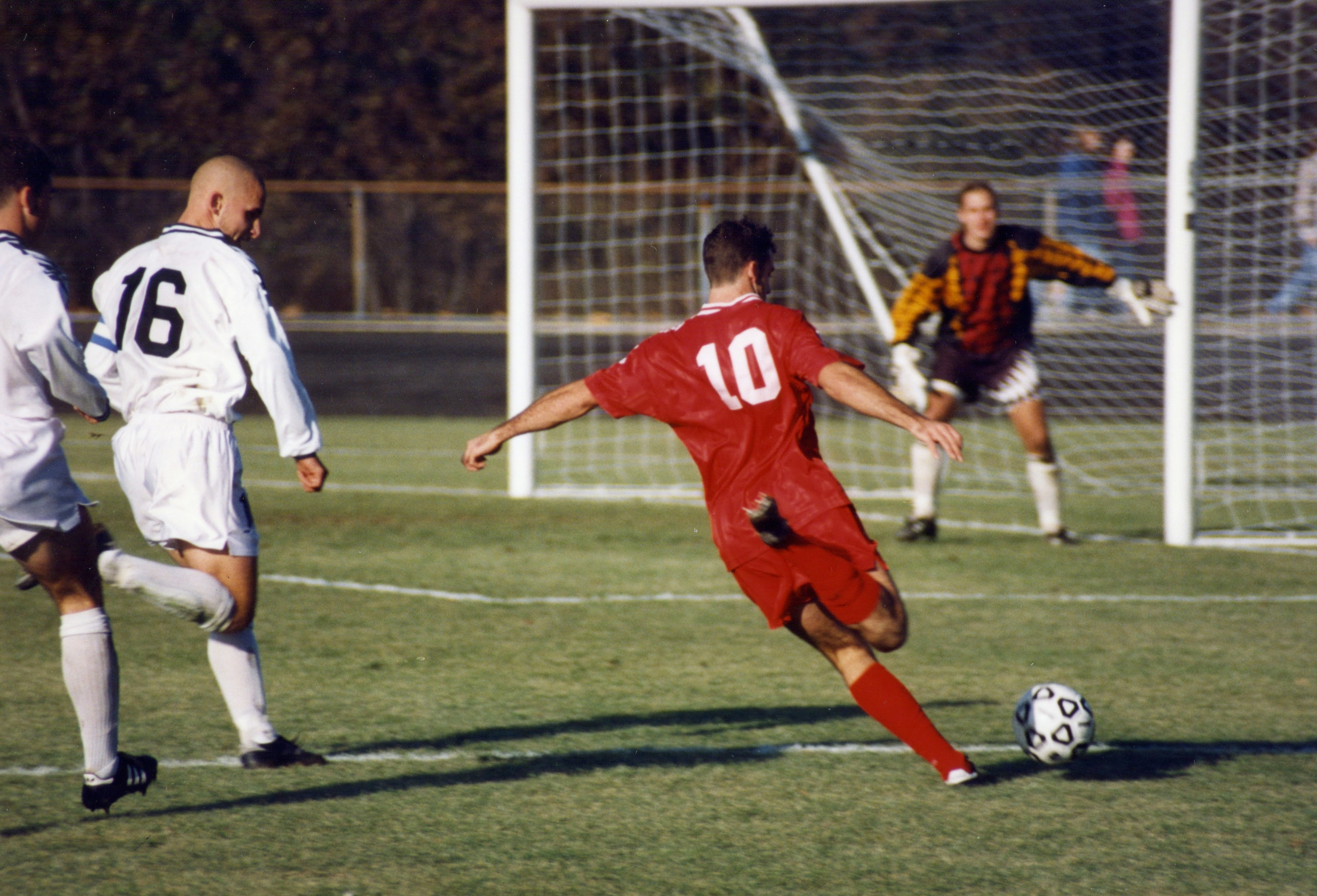
Defenders must stop shots from the most dangerous areas

The first defender is the first respondent, regardless of what the opponent in possession does, seeking to obstruct the opponents attacking play. The first defender is usually the player closest to the opponent holding possession, but needs to be at the defending side. This role commonly involves angling the body in an attempt to guide the opponent in a direction preferable to the defensive side. The first defender may also indicate to the rest of the team whether to stay high or back off from pressure. (Note: As defensive sides have to make split-second decisions on whether to press the opponent on the ball or lay off, a system needs to be incurred for this. The primary responsibility for indicating whether a press is to be invoked or not most commonly falls on the first defender.)

The first defender will normally keep a distance to the opponent of a few yards, although the exact distance varies for each defending situation. The idea is to pressure the opposing player as tightly as possible without giving them the ability to successfully dribble or feint. In certain cases, the first defender attempts a tackle; however, this increases the probability of being dribbled and passed, so it has to be managed wisely.

Often, the direction that results in the shortest distance is ideal when moving toward an opponent in possession of the ball; however, it may be of value to adjust the defensive movement in order to channel the opponent in a certain direction. Different teams will channel opponents towards different lanes depending on the situation as well as their preferred tactics. For example, a common tactic for a first defender is to channel the opposing player to an area where a second or third defender is located, thus making it safe to lead the opponent there.

The second defender provides immediate support for the first defender. If the first defender loses their marking, the second defender takes over as first defender, and ideally one of the third defenders takes over as second defender. A defensive side should be organised so as to make this transition as smooth as possible. A typical distance between the second and first defender is about six metres, though this varies depending on several variables, the most significant being the opponent's speed. If the opposing player is moving fast, the distance should be longer. If he is standing still, the distance should be shorter or even removed as the second and first defender join and operate as two first defenders. A second defender also adjusts their positioning relative to where teammates of the defensive side are positioned in order to uphold defensive structure (see for example offside trap).

The role of the third defender is to provide deeper cover. They are often in a stand-off position relative to the first and second defenders and therefore have a view of the entire defense; therefore, they are expected to watch for other opponents moving up and to cover gaps if the first and second defenders are outmanoeuvred by the opponent. In addition, the third defender is usually tasked with informing teammates (including but not limited to first and second defenders) about potential threats. While the role of first and second defenders are relatively similar regardless of defending strategies and systems, the third defenders' role is very different in zone defence and man-to-man defence.

=== Depth considerations ===
While line depth varies considerably depending on team strategy as well as game situation, a good "rule of thumb" for distances between defensive and midfield lines is about 16 metres (17-18 yards). Line depth also depends on factors such as line width, as well as whether the team stays central or tries to push out wide when the ball is near the sidelines. Defensively minded teams use shorter line depths compared to offensively minded teams, and line depth is also likely to be less when the ball is in the defending team's final third, compared to further up the pitch.

When organised, some defensive tactics offer little resistance until the attacking team has reached a certain height on the pitch. The pressure height, or at which field depth the midfielders start acting as first and second defenders, depends on many factors, including team tactics and in-game situations. High pressure teams attempt to win the ball back quickly, while defensive-minded teams generally stay lower, conserving energy and minimising defensive risks by compressing space. The pressure height may be identified by which stage of the opposing team's attacking play the first pressure line of support kicks in.

=== The zone defence ===
In zone defence, second and third defenders and midfielders are organised in two lines in the transversal direction of the field: the defender and midfielder lines. These lines support each other in attempting to prevent attacking movement in the space in front of or between them, and a straight line of defenders can also prevent the opponent from exploiting space behind them through use of the offside rule. The number of players in the defender and midfielder lines is generally determined by the team's chosen formation, with formations also employing midfield anchors to prevent attacks between the two lines.

=== The man-to-man defence ===
In man-to-man defence, a single defender follows a single opponent wherever they go. This tactic generally allows for tighter marking and is often used to "neutralise" star players on the opponent's team. Since the man-to-man defence requires defenders to move to any part of the field, interceptions and broken plays often offer opportunity for counter-attacks. The Italian teams of the 1970s and 1980s frequently used this approach.

The main drawback of man-to-man defence is a lack of depth, as it can result in one-on-one defending and in defenders being drawn out of position, the latter of which results in space for other attackers to exploit. To prevent this, man to man defences often feature a central defender with no assigned player to mark (known as a sweeper) who often position himself slightly behind the defensive line, where he 'sweeps up' attacks that break through the defence. Zone defence does not require a sweeper and because many teams now prefer this tactic, sweepers today are rare.

=== Other considerations ===
Additional defensive considerations include:

- Width of defence – what proportion of the pitch width is covered by the defence in a particular situation,
- Height of defence – a low block indicates an emphasis on defending the own half, a medium block indicates an emphasis on defending the first two-thirds of the pitch, and a high block indicates emphasis on defending all or most of the pitch, and said terms also indicate at what point in the play progression of the opposite side that teams elect to press or to drop from pressing the ball,
- Offside-trap – whether a team tries to follow oncoming attacking players or attempt to "trap" opposing players in an offside position,
- Strong-side tilt – to what extent a team moves over towards the side of the pitch the ball is located versus staying central,
- Active defending – to what extent a team attempts to get close to the ball versus staying in position and/or preventing passes,
- Defensive line height – how much space the defensive line allows behind it.

=== Defending set pieces ===
==== Free-kicks from short range ====
A wall of defensive players is often used to defend free-kicks from short range, particularly direct free-kicks. The number of players in the wall depends on the angle and distance from the goal, the opponent's shooting skills, and the need to mark opponents to whom the ball might be passed. The wall, typically set up at the direction of the defending goalkeeper, is usually used to block a direct shot at the portion of the goal nearest to the free-kick taker, with the goalkeeper himself normally positioned to defend the rest of the goal. Defenders in the wall often jump vertically when the kick is taken to increase the height of the wall, with an additional defender lying on the ground behind the wall to prevent the free-kick from going under.

Indirect free-kicks often require additional considerations for the defending team, most notably the wall must be prepared to charge at the ball once it has been touched by the free-kick taker.

==== Corner kicks and other crosses ====
On corner kicks, and on free kicks or throw-ins in which the attacking team is likely to distribute a cross, most teams use man-on-man defense, even those which otherwise play zone defence. In advanced football, defenders are usually assigned a specific opponent to mark before the match. Additionally, defensive substitutions in these situations is generally regarded as unwise, as play may be started before the substitute has come into marking position.

Although not common, some teams do use zone defense on corner kicks and similar situations; this generally involves the defense gathering defenders on one line with minimal space between defenders for the attacking team to exploit.

==== Penalty kicks ====
No players except the penalty-taker and goalkeeper are allowed within the penalty area or within ten yards of the penalty spot and 18 yards of the goal line during a penalty kick. Because of this, a significant number of defenders are often placed just outside the penalty area so that they may clear any deflection. Additionally, because some attacking teams have players run at the goal to score should a deflection occur, some defenders position themselves specifically to delay the attackers' runs.

A common goalkeeper tactic when defending penalty kicks involves guessing which side the penalty taker will shoot at, then diving to that side in advance. However, the goalkeeper cannot diving too far in advance, as it gives the taker the ability to change their aim should the guess be correct. Additionally, some penalty takers take advantage of this goalkeeper tactic by shooting straight down the middle, which becomes open once the goalkeeper dives to either side.

Because penalty kicks are overwhelmingly in the takers favor, some goalkeepers use gamesmanship to help gain an advantage. Common gamesmanship tactics involve trying to distract the penalty taker, either through verbal comments and/or moving one's body or body parts in an extravagant manner, and attempting to "get in the taker's head", either through verbal comments, delaying the kick, or other means. Famous examples where this was successful include Bruce Grobbelaar in the 1984 European Cup final, Jerzy Dudek in the 2005 Champions League Final, and Emi Martinez in the 2022 World Cup Final.

=== "Forward" versus "collapsing" defences ===
Teams may use forward defending, aggressively challenging the ball when on the defensive in any part of the field. Others rely on a "collapsing" style that falls back into its own half when the opponent is in possession. The forward tactic can put immense physical and psychological pressure on opponents and is aimed at slowing down or breaking up attacks early, allowing for counterattacks. However, this tactic has more physical demands and can spread a defensive formation more thinly. In general, defensive-minded teams will stay lower, minimising defensive risks by compressing attacking space. However, this tactic can create large gaps in midfield, inviting the opposing team to move forward and take shots from long range.

The most prominent form of "forward" defending, Gegenpressing (German: [ˈɡeːɡn̩ˌpʁɛsɪŋ], "counter-pressing"), developed by Ralf Rangnick and exemplified by teams managed by German managers such as Jürgen Klopp and Thomas Tuchel, requires attackers and midfielders to press the opposition immediately following loss of possession.

==== Defending with the ball ====
When a team is attacking high up the field, such as in or near the opposing team's penalty area, the attacking team's defenders will usually push of their defensive half, closing the space between attack and defence and also forcing the opposing team's attackers to retreat to avoid offside infractions.

A clearance is when the player in possession of the ball, often near the own goal, kicks the ball away in order to get the ball out of a dangerous area of play. When opponent pressure is high, the ball is often cleared out of play, as clearing long but into opponent control may not give the defence the time to regroup. Clearing may also be combined with an attempt to connect a long pass or through ball to teammates up the field, and players high up the field who are under pressure and wish to avoid a counter-attack may in some instances combine clearing with a shot.

Teams composed of good passers and mobile players with good positioning skills often try to avoid clearing, as they prefer to retain possession. Retaining possession in this way can also be regarded as a defensive tactic, as the opposing team cannot attack when are out of possession. Teams applying this tactic often pass the ball with little or no intention of attacking, thus decreasing the risk of a turnover. Additional benefit of this tactic are that it can tire opponents defending with a high-press and it can quickly turn to attack should an opportunity suddenly arise. A drawback of this tactic is that it usually narrows the gap between the attack and defence, meaning that if possession is lost, the defence is vulnerable to counterattacks.

== History ==
=== Notable examples ===
==== Combined team play using width and depth ====
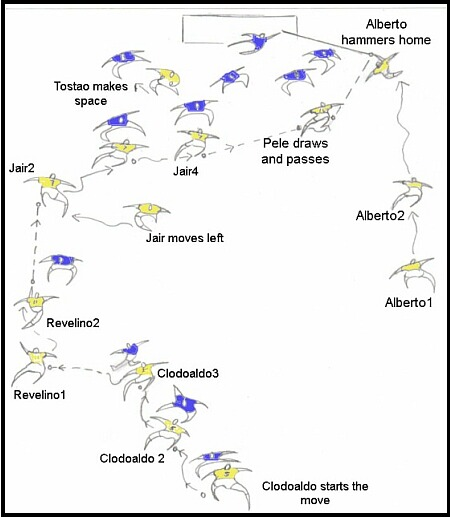
Brazil goal against Italy, 1970

Astute use of width and depth led to the last goal of the 1970 FIFA World Cup final, considered by many to be the best combined team effort in World Cup history. Almost all of Brazil's players touched the ball in this effort that penetrated the renowned Italian catenaccio defence. The Italians used four defenders, all of whom closely marked opponents man to man, plus a sweeper and the team relied on counter-attacks in attack, deploying three midfielders and two strikers.

This system involved a collapsing approach that packed their defensive penalty area and denied the opponent much forward space, but it also left relatively large gaps in midfield. Brazil exploited this weakness and also exposed the weaknesses of the man to man system. For example, Italian left back Giacinto Facchetti marked winger Jairzinho, who would move off the right flank and open gaps for teammates to exploit.

For Brazil's final goal, Brazilian midfielder Clodoaldo began by a dribbling past three opponents in the left channel, effectively pulling the Italian defence toward him and creating a gap on the right. Clodoaldo then passed the ball far left to Rivellino, who quickly passed the ball forward to Jairzinho who had moved into open space on the left. Jairzinho then dribbled forward, with defender Facchetti backing off the ball and squeezing him inside toward additional defenders. While this happened, striker Tostão made a run up the middle, drawing his defender with him and making more room for Jairzinho. Despite this, Jairzinho was still outnumbered by defenders, so he passed the ball to Pelé to his right. Pelé attracted the attention of three defenders, after which he slipped the ball to his right, to Carlos Alberto who was approaching from the rear, unmarked and taking advantage of the open space. Alberto shot while in full stride, scoring past the Italian goalkeeper.

==== Penetration and envelopment in attack ====
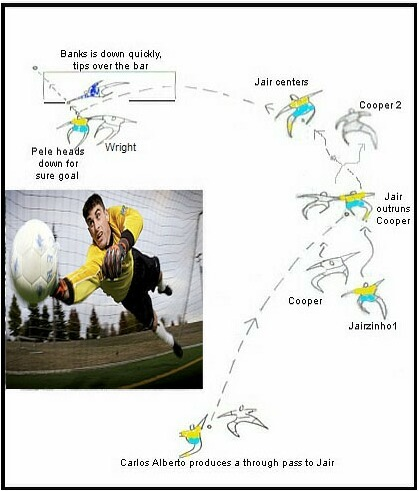
England's Gordon Banks denies Brazil's Pelé, 1970

The penetration pass is one of the first methods learned in attack and is the quickest method of advancing the ball towards the opposing team's goal. Additionally, using crosses to attack the defence's opposing side from the flanks is among the oldest and most effective tactics. The confrontation between English goalkeeper Gordon Banks and Brazilian attacker Pelé during the 1970 FIFA World Cup Group 3 match captures these types of attack.

Brazil's right winger Jairzinho initiated the attack by running into space and receiving a through pass from Carlos Alberto, after which he accelerated past English defender Terry Cooper and lofted a high arcing cross to Pelé in the centre. Pelé headed the ball downward towards goal and was already celebrating when Banks dove to his right and flailed the bouncing ball over the crossbar, a save Pelé described as the best he'd ever seen.

==== Two-man combination ====
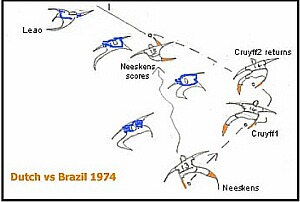
Netherlands uses a wall pass against Brazil, 1974

The two-man combination pass, variously called the wall pass, the "one-two", the "give and go" and other names, is among the simplest team techniques in football. However, despite its simplicity, this tactic is often effective in penetrating the opposition, as the Netherlands showed against Brazil in 1974.

==== Three-man move ====
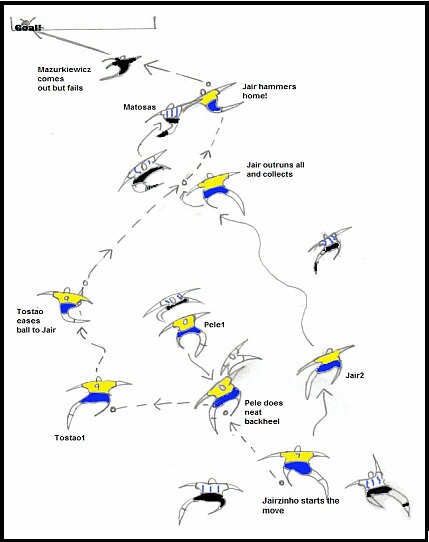
Uruguay's defence is broken by Brazil, 1970

The three-man move is distinguished from simple passing in that the initiator of the move finishes it with a shot or a well-placed pass that leads to a shot. An example of this tactic was used by Brazil's Pelé, Tostão and Jairzinho against Uruguay in the 1970 World Cup semi-final.

Jairzinho started the move with a pass to Pelé, who was tightly marked and with his back to the goal. Pelé immediately passed to Tostão, who dribbled forward, drawing the defence toward him as Jairzinho advanced on the opposite flank. Tostão then passed to Jairzinho, who scored past the Uruguayan goalkeeper.

==== Quick long-ball counter-attack ====
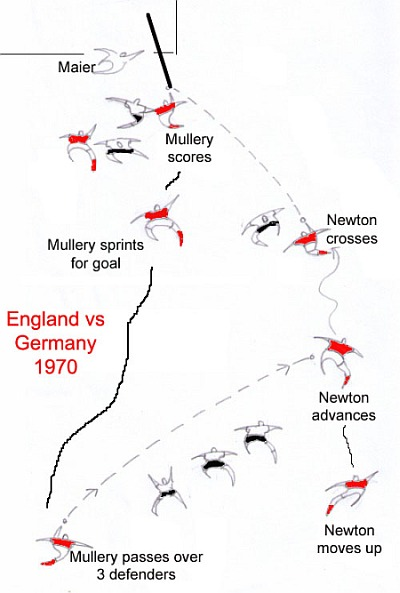
Mullery's first goal for England, Mexico 1970

Counter attacking football involves a team withdrawing players into their own half while ensuring one or two players are committed to the attack, as done by England against Germany in the 1970 World Cup.

Defensive midfielder Alan Mullery began the counter attack by lofting a long through pass over the heads of three German defenders to Keith Newton on the right flank. Mullery then ran forward as Newton produced a diagonal cross to him. Mullery then finished the attack with a goal.

==== Free-kicks ====
Free-kicks are a key part of attack and often lead to goals, and often, the attacking team uses trickery in an attempt to fool the defence. An example of this occurred when Brazil faced Czechoslovakia in the 1970 World Cup, when Brazilian forwards Jairzinho and Tostao joined the end of the Czech's defensive wall. Pelé then feinted as if to take the free kick, at which point Jairzinho and Tostão began to move off the wall, creating space for Rivellino to take the free kick and score.

In addition to trickery, free-kicks can confuse defenses when taken quickly or in an unexpected direction, as shown in Brazil's 1970 World Cup third goal against Italy. Brazilian Gerson Nunes took the free kick, approaching rapidly and lofting the ball from the midfield to Pelé, who was positioned near the Italian goal. Pelé then headed the ball into the path of teammate Jairzinho, who easily scored, as Italy's defence was caught out of position, not only failing to neutralise Pelé, but also providing little cover to stop Jairzinho.

==== Moving into space ====
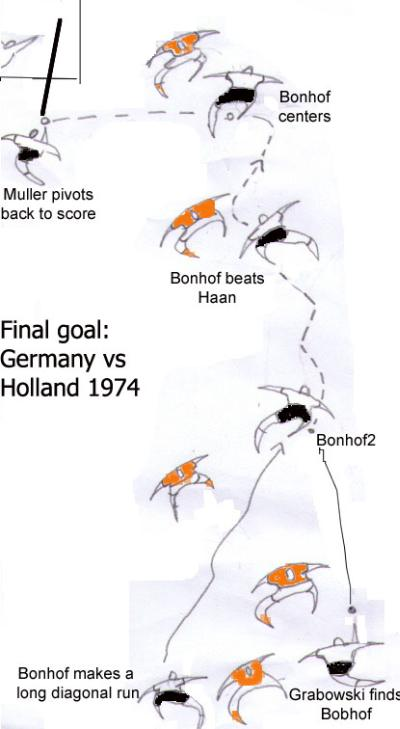
Moving into space: the diagonal run

Moving into free space is one of the most important skills football players develop, and the use of this skill is instrumental in many attacking tactics. An example occurred in the 1974 FIFA World Cup Final, which led to West Germany's game-winning goal. The move began with German midfielder Rainer Bonhof making a diagonal run to the right side of the field. Deep into the Dutch half, Bonhof received a passed from Jürgen Grabowski, dribbled past Arie Haan, and then sent a low cross to Gerd Müller, who scored.

=== Studies ===
Although the scientific research field of association football is still in its early days, some interesting studies are emerging. It has for example been shown, that in possession play, successful teams have both longer and more frequent possessions in the offensive areas of the pitch, as well as finding it easier to move the ball into the offensive areas of the pitch, after initiating possession, when compared to unsuccessful teams. As a defensive strategy, research has suggested that being able to consistently pose players immediately behind the ball, as well as in other areas of proximity to the ball indicates a positive correlation with defensive goal prevention both when in and out of possession.

Statistical methods for modeling player analysis have proven useful in performance assessment. Similar methods find their use in predictions and evaluations of matches.

== See also ==
- Association football positions
- Formation (association football)
- Football club (association football)
- Glossary of association football terms
- List of association football skills
