= 1997–98 Wigan Athletic F.C. season =

Wigan Athletic
1997–98 season
- Chairman: Dave Whelan
- Manager: John Deehan
- Stadium: Springfield Park
- Second Division: 11th
- FA Cup: Third round
- League Cup: First round
- Auto Windscreens Shield: Quarter finals
- Top goalscorer: League: Lowe (16); All: Lowe (18)
- Average home league attendance: 3,968

During the 1997–98 English football season, Wigan Athletic F.C. competed in the Football League Second Division.

== Season summary ==
In the 1997–98 season, Wigan didn't start the campaign very well and by the end of November, sat in the bottom four and were favourites to go down before the season started and it seemed a possibility at that stage. By 21 February, their fortunes didn't really improve and were still in the relegation battle in 17th and two points clear of the relegation zone. From then onwards, Wigan went on a great run of form to end the season with seven wins from their final 15 league games and finished in a satisfying 11th place.

== Transfers ==
=== In ===
Player	Pos	From	Fee	Date	Notes
Scott Green	DF	Bolton Wanderers	£300,000	30 June 1997	
David Lee	MF	Bolton Wanderers	£250,000	18 July 1997	
Pat McGibbon	DF	Manchester United	£250,000	30 July 1997	
Paul Warne	FW	Wroxham	£25,000	30 July 1997	
Brendan O'Connell	MF	Charlton Athletic	£120,000	8 August 1997	
Jorg Smeets	MF	Heracles Almelo	£100,000	1 October 1997	
Carl Bradshaw	DF	Norwich City	Free	3 October 1997	
Neil Mustoe	MF	Manchester United	Undisclosed	7 January 1998	
Stuart Barlow	FW	Oldham Athletic	£45,000	26 March 1998	

=== Out ===
Player	Pos	To	Fee	Date	Notes
John Pender	DF	Rochdale	£11,500	22 July 1997	
Graham Lancashire	FW	Rochdale	£40,000	2 October 1997	
Andy Saville	FW	Cardiff City	£60,000	31 October 1997	
Tony Black	MF	Accrington Stanley	Released	31 October 1997	
Charlie Bishop	MF	Northampton Town	£20,000	12 December 1997	

=== Loans in ===
Player	Pos	From	Date	Duration	Notes
Drewe Broughton	FW	Norwich City	15 August 1997	One month	
Neil Woods	FW	Grimsby Town	6 November 1997	One month	
Graham Branch	DF	Tranmere Rovers	24 December 1997	One month	
Neil Whitworth	DF	Kilmarnock	11 March 1998	End of season	
Rob Newman	DF	Norwich City	26 March 1998	End of season	

=== Loans out ===
Player	Pos	To	Date	Duration	Notes
Steve Morgan	DF	Bury	26 September 1997	One month	

== Results ==
Wigan Athletic's score comes first

Legend

Win	Draw	Loss

=== Pre-season ===
Date	Opponent	Venue	Result	Scorers	Notes
17 July 1997	Wroxham	A	3–2		
20 July 1997	Wrexham	N	0–0 (lost 1–3 on pens)		(Note: Isle of Man Festival game)
23 July 1997	Isle of Man XI	N	4–1		
25 July 1997	Oldham Athletic	N	1–0		
30 July 1997	Huddersfield Town	H	0–2		
1 August 1997	West Bromwich Albion	H	2–0		

=== Football League Second Division ===
Date	Opponent	Venue	Result	Attendance	Scorers
9 August 1997	Wycombe Wanderers	H	5–2	4,706	O'Connell (3), Green, Kilford
16 August 1997	Bournemouth	A	0–1	3,799	
23 August 1997	Plymouth Argyle	H	1–1	3,761	Lowe
30 August 1997	Bristol City	A	0–3	9,255	
2 September 1997	Carlisle United	A	0–1	5,352	
8 September 1997	Wrexham	H	3–2	3,872	O'Connell, Lowe, Jones (pen)
13 September 1997	Blackpool	H	3–0	5,517	Johnson, Lowe (2)
20 September 1997	Northampton Town	A	0–1	6,570	
27 September 1997	Fulham	H	2–1	4,951	Johnson, Greenall
4 October 1997	Grimsby Town	A	1–2	4,623	Lowe
11 October 1997	Chesterfield	A	3–2	4,673	O'Connell, Greenall, Lowe
18 October 1997	Luton Town	H	1–1	4,466	Jones (pen)
21 October 1997	Gillingham	H	1–4	3,214	Lee
25 October 1997	Millwall	A	1–1	7,986	Jones
1 November 1997	York City	H	1–1	3,701	Greenall
4 November 1997	Oldham Athletic	A	1–3	5,446	Lowe
8 November 1997	Southend United	A	0–1	2,716	
22 November 1997	Preston North End	H	1–4	5,649	Kilford
29 November 1997	Watford	A	1–2	9,455	Jones
2 December 1997	Bristol Rovers	H	3–0	2,738	Kilford, Lowe (2)
13 December 1997	Burnley	A	2–0	9,520	Lee, Jones
20 December 1997	Brentford	H	4–0	3,301	Lowe, Smeets (2), Kilford
26 December 1997	Wrexham	A	2–2	4,577	Smeets, Kilford
28 December 1997	Carlisle United	H	0–2	4,511	
10 January 1998	Wycombe Wanderers	A	2–1	5,549	Martínez, Lee
17 January 1998	Bristol City	H	0–3	5,078	
24 January 1998	Plymouth Argyle	A	2–3	4,345	Kilford, Lee
31 January 1998	Blackpool	A	2–0	5,288	Warne, Lydiate (own goal)
7 February 1998	Northampton Town	H	1–1	3,579	Morgan
14 February 1998	Grimsby Town	H	0–2	3,548	
21 February 1998	Fulham	A	0–2	7,791	
24 February 1998	Luton Town	A	1–1	4,403	Jones
28 February 1998	Chesterfield	H	2–1	3,017	Lowe, Jones (pen)
7 March 1998	York City	A	2–2	3,536	Greenall, Jones
14 March 1998	Oldham Athletic	H	1–0	4,277	Kilford
17 March 1998	Southend United	H	1–3	2,616	Lowe
21 March 1998	Walsall	A	0–1	3,169	
28 March 1998	Preston North End	A	1–1	10,171	Lowe
4 April 1998	Watford	H	3–2	4,262	Barlow, Lowe, Kilford
7 April 1998	Bournemouth	H	1–0	2,798	Lee
10 April 1998	Bristol Rovers	A	0–5	6,038	
13 April 1998	Burnley	H	5–1	4,926	Barlow, Lowe (2), Warne, Kilford
18 April 1998	Brentford	A	2–0	4,480	Bradshaw (pen), Kilford
21 April 1998	Walsall	H	2–0	2,725	Barlow, Jones
24 April 1998	Millwall	H	0–0	4,045	
2 May 1998	Gillingham	A	0–0	10,361	

=== Final league table ===
Pos	Team	Pld	W	D	L	GF	GA	GD	Pts
9	Bournemouth	46	18	12	16	57	52	+5	66
10	Chesterfield	46	16	17	13	46	44	+2	65
11	Wigan Athletic	46	17	11	18	64	66	−2	62
12	Blackpool	46	17	11	18	59	67	−8	62
13	Oldham Athletic	46	15	16	15	62	54	+8	61

Rules for classification: In the Football League goals scored (GF) takes precedence over goal difference (GD).

=== FA Cup ===
Round	Date	Opponent	Venue	Result	Attendance	Goalscorers
First	15 November 1997	Carlisle United	A	1–0	5,182	Jones
Second	6 December 1997	York City	H	2–1	4,021	Martínez, Lee
Third	3 January 1998	Blackburn Rovers	A	2–4	22,402	Lee, Lowe

=== League Cup ===
Round	Date	Opponent	Venue	Result	Attendance	Goalscorers
First (1st leg)	12 August 1997	Chesterfield	H	1–2	3,413	Lee
First (2nd leg)	26 August 1997	Chesterfield	A	0–1 (lost 1–3 on agg)	4,076	

=== Football League Trophy ===
Round	Date	Opponent	Venue	Result	Attendance	Goalscorers
First (Northern)	9 December 1997	Lincoln City	H	2–0	1,467	Jones (2, 1 pen)
Second (Northern)	20 January 1998	Rotherham United	H	3–0	1,495	Jones (2), Lowe
Quarter final (Northern)	27 January 1998	Blackpool	A	0–1	1,687	

== Squad ==
Note: Numbers in brackets are appearances as a substitute.

Players' appearances and goals by competition
Nat.	Pos.	Player	Apps	Goals	Apps	Goals	Apps	Goals	Apps	Goals
Nat.	Pos.	Player	League		FA Cup		Other		Total	
(England)	FW	Stuart Barlow	9	3	0	0	0	0	9	3
(England)	DF	Charlie Bishop	7	0	0	0	1	0	8	0
(England)	MF	Tony Black	0 (1)	0	0	0	0 (1)	0	0 (2)	0
(England)	DF	Carl Bradshaw	27 (1)	1	1	0	0	0	28 (1)	1
(England)	DF	Graham Branch	2 (1)	0	0	0	0	0	2 (1)	0
(England)	FW	Drewe Broughton	1 (3)	0	0	0	0	0	1 (3)	0
(Italy)	DF	Pasquale Bruno	1	0	0	0	0	0	1	0
(England)	GK	Lee Butler	17	0	1	0	2	0	20	0
(Northern Ireland)	GK	Roy Carroll	29	0	2	0	3	0	34	0
(Spain)	MF	Isidro Díaz	1 (1)	0	0	0	0	0	1 (1)	0
(England)	DF	Neil Fitzhenry	1 (2)	0	0	0	1	0	2 (2)	0
(England)	DF	Scott Green	37 (1)	1	3	0	4	0	44 (1)	1
(England)	DF	Colin Greenall	39	4	3	0	5	0	47	4
(England)	DF	Sean Hessey	0	0	0	0	0	0	0	0
(England)	MF	Gavin Johnson	18 (2)	2	2	0	2	0	22 (2)	2
(England)	FW	Graeme Jones	28 (5)	9	3	1	4	4	35 (5)	14
(England)	MF	Ian Kilford	29 (1)	10	3	0	2 (2)	0	34 (3)	10
(England)	FW	Graham Lancashire	0 (1)	0	0	0	0 (1)	0	0 (2)	0
(England)	FW	David Lee	41 (2)	5	3	2	5	1	49 (2)	8
(England)	FW	David Lowe	42 (1)	16	2 (1)	1	5	1	49 (2)	18
(Spain)	MF	Roberto Martínez	26 (7)	1	2	1	3 (1)	0	31 (8)	2
(Northern Ireland)	DF	Pat McGibbon	32 (3)	0	3	0	3	0	38 (3)	0
(England)	DF	Steve Morgan	13	1	1	0	3	0	17	1
(England)	MF	Neil Mustoe	0	0	0	0	0 (1)	0	0 (1)	0
(England)	DF	Rob Newman	8	0	0	0	0	0	8	0
(England)	MF	Brendan O'Connell	17	5	1	0	2	0	20	5
(England)	MF	Paul Rogers	32 (6)	0	1	0	4	0	37 (6)	0
(England)	FW	Andy Saville	0 (5)	0	0	0	0 (1)	0	0 (6)	0
(England)	DF	Kevin Sharp	34 (4)	0	1 (1)	0	3 (1)	0	38 (6)	0
(Netherlands)	MF	Jorg Smeets	10 (13)	3	1	0	3	0	14 (13)	3
(England)	FW	Paul Warne	3 (22)	2	0	0	0 (2)	0	3 (24)	2
(England)	DF	Neil Whitworth	1 (3)	0	0	0	0	0	1 (3)	0
(England)	FW	Neil Woods	1	0	0	0	0	0	1	0
