= 1996–97 Wigan Athletic F.C. season =

Wigan Athletic
1996–97 season
- Chairman: Dave Whelan
- Manager: John Deehan
- Stadium: Springfield Park
- Third Division: 1st (champions)
- FA Cup: First round
- League Cup: First round
- Football League Trophy: Second round
- Top goalscorer: League: Jones (31); All: Jones (33)
- Average home league attendance: 3,899

During the 1996–97 English football season, Wigan Athletic F.C. competed in the Football League Third Division.

== Season summary ==
In the 1996–97 season, Wigan Athletic became Third Division champions on the last day of the campaign, Graeme Jones scoring a club record 31 league goals in the process. In most seasons they would have been runners-up, but a temporary rule change which saw goals scored take precedence over goal difference allowed them to finish above runners-up Fulham, who had the same number of points and a better goal difference.

== Transfers ==
=== In ===
Player	Pos	From	Fee	Date	Notes
Lee Butler	GK	Barnsley	Free	1 July 1996	
Charlie Bishop	DF	Barnsley	£20,000	1 July 1996	
Steve Morgan	DF	Coventry City	Free	5 July 1996	
Graeme Jones	FW	Doncaster Rovers	£150,000	8 July 1996	
Andy Saville	FW	Preston North End	£100,000	25 October 1996	
Paul Rogers	MF	Notts County	£50,000	7 March 1997	
Roy Carroll	GK	Hull City	£350,000	16 April 1997	

=== Out ===
Player	Pos	To	Fee	Date	Notes
Jesús Seba	MF	Real Zaragoza	Released	15 October 1996	
Mark Ward	MF		Released	31 October 1996	
Michael Love	DF	Sligo Rovers	Free	24 January 1997	
Wayne Biggins	MF	Leek Town	Released	31 May 1997	
John Butler	DF	Stalybridge Celtic	Released	31 May 1997	
Matt Carragher	DF	Port Vale	Released	31 May 1997	

=== Loans in ===
Player	Pos	From	Date	Duration	Notes
Stuart Whittaker	MF	Bolton Wanderers	30 August 1996	One month	
Paul Rogers	MF	Notts County	13 December 1996	Three months	
Pat McGibbon	DF	Manchester United	3 March 1997	End of season	

== Results ==
Wigan Athletic's score comes first

Legend

Win	Draw	Loss

=== Pre-season ===
Wigan additionally played a behind closed doors friendly against Bolton Wanderers on 12 August, which was drawn 3–3.

Date	Opponent	Venue	Result	Scorers	Notes
22 July 1996	Port Vale	N	2–3		(Note: Isle of Man Festival game)
23 July 1996	West Bromwich Albion	N	0–1		
26 July 1996	Isle of Man XI	N	3–1		
30 July 1996	Preston North End	A	0–1		(Note: Lancashire Marsden Cup game)
3 August 1996	Southport	A	2–1		
6 August 1996	Coventry City	H	2–2		
10 August 1996	Barnsley	H	1–1		

=== League ===
Date	Opponent	Venue	Result	Attendance	Scorers
17 August 1996	Northampton Town	H	2–1	3,449	Lancashire, Biggins
24 August 1996	Barnet	A	1–1	1,905	Jones
27 August 1996	Cardiff City	A	2–0	3,354	Jones, Kilford
31 August 1996	Chester City	H	4–2	3,854	Jones (3, 1 pen), Shelton (own goal)
7 September 1996	Scunthorpe United	H	3–0	3,321	Jones, Lancashire (2)
10 September 1996	Darlington	A	1–3	2,601	Greenall
14 September 1996	Hartlepool United	A	1–1	2,433	Jones
21 September 1996	Lincoln City	H	1–0	3,394	Lancashire
28 September 1996	Scarborough	A	1–3	2,570	Lancashire
1 October 1996	Exeter City	H	2–0	2,788	Lancashire, Jones
5 October 1996	Brighton & Hove Albion	H	1–0	3,744	Jones
12 October 1996	Colchester United	A	1–3	2,700	Sharp
15 October 1996	Mansfield Town	A	1–0	1,942	Sharp
19 October 1996	Torquay United	H	3–2	3,374	Jones (3)
26 October 1996	Hull City	H	1–2	3,887	Morgan
29 October 1996	Swansea City	A	1–2	2,227	Díaz
2 November 1996	Carlisle United	A	3–0	6,235	Díaz (2), Saville
9 November 1996	Hereford United	H	4–1	3,414	Martínez, Jones, Greenall, Saville
23 November 1996	Fulham	H	1–1	5,039	Martínez
30 November 1996	Hull City	A	1–1	3,537	Jones
3 December 1996	Doncaster Rovers	H	4–1	2,606	Biggins, Johnson, Saville, Jones
14 December 1996	Cambridge United	A	1–1	2,784	Kilford
21 December 1996	Rochdale	H	0–1	3,311	
28 December 1996	Scunthorpe United	A	3–2	2,833	Saville, Rogers, Kilford
18 January 1997	Exeter City	A	1–0	3,067	Johnson
21 January 1997	Leyton Orient	A	2–1	3,014	Kilford, Jones
25 January 1997	Swansea City	H	3–2	4,058	Jones (2), Kilford
1 February 1997	Hereford United	A	1–3	2,532	Rogers
4 February 1997	Lincoln City	A	3–1	2,241	Jones (2), Johnson
8 February 1997	Carlisle United	H	1–0	6,195	Lowe
15 February 1997	Fulham	A	1–1	9,448	Lowe
22 February 1997	Leyton Orient	H	5–1	3,783	Jones (3), Lancashire, Rogers
25 February 1997	Darlington	H	3–2	3,667	Jones (3, 1 pen)
28 February 1997	Doncaster Rovers	A	0–2	2,948	
4 March 1997	Hartlepool United	H	2–2	3,229	Jones, Kilford
8 March 1997	Rochdale	A	1–3	3,254	Jones (pen)
11 March 1997	Scarborough	H	7–1	3,094	Martínez, Lowe (2), Díaz (2), Lancashire, Biggins
15 March 1997	Cambridge United	H	1–1	3,867	Jones
22 March 1997	Barnet	H	2–0	3,286	Kilford, Martínez
29 March 1997	Northampton Town	A	1–0	5,914	Lowe
31 March 1997	Cardiff City	H	0–1	4,634	
5 April 1997	Chester City	A	1–1	4,005	Kilford
8 April 1997	Colchester United	H	1–0	4,571	McGibbon
12 April 1997	Brighton & Hove Albion	A	0–1	8,703	
26 April 1997	Torquay United	A	3–0	2,481	Jones (2), Díaz
3 May 1997	Mansfield Town	H	2–0	7,106	Lancashire, Lowe

=== Final league table ===
Pos	Team	Pld	W	D	L	GF	GA	GD	Pts	Promotion or relegation
1	Wigan Athletic (C, P)	46	26	9	11	84	51	+33	87	Promotion to the Second Division
2	Fulham (P)	46	25	12	9	72	38	+34	87	Promotion to the Second Division
3	Carlisle United (P)	46	24	12	10	67	44	+23	84	Promotion to the Second Division
4	Northampton Town (O, P)	46	20	12	14	67	44	+23	72	Qualification for the Third Division play-offs
5	Swansea City	46	21	8	17	62	58	+4	71	Qualification for the Third Division play-offs

Rules for classification: In the Football League goals scored (GF) takes precedence over goal difference (GD).
(C) Champions; (O) Play-off winners; (P) Promoted

=== FA Cup ===
Round	Date	Opponent	Venue	Result	Attendance	Goalscorers
First	16 November 1996	Blackpool	A	0–1	5,465	

=== League Cup ===
Round	Date	Opponent	Venue	Result	Attendance	Goalscorers
First (1st leg)	20 August 1996	Preston North End	H	2–3	3,713	Lancashire, Jones
First (2nd leg)	3 September 1996	Preston North End	A	4–4 (a.e.t.)	5,767	Lancashire (3), Greenall
Preston won 7–6 on aggregate

=== Football League Trophy ===
Round	Date	Opponent	Venue	Result	Attendance	Goalscorers
NR2	14 January 1997	Shrewsbury Town	A	2–3 (a.e.t.) (Note: Shrewsbury Town won via the golden goal rule.)	1,639	Martínez, Jones

== Squad ==
Note: Numbers in brackets are appearances as a substitute.

Nat.	Pos.	Player	Apps	Goals	Apps	Goals	Apps	Goals	Apps	Goals
Nat.	Pos.	Player	League		FA Cup		Other		Total	
(England)	FW	Wayne Biggins	20 (13)	3	1	0	1 (2)	0	22 (15)	3
(England)	DF	Charlie Bishop	20 (1)	0	0	0	2	0	22 (1)	0
(England)	DF	John Butler	20 (4)	0	1	0	1	0	22 (4)	0
(England)	GK	Lee Butler	46	0	1	0	3	0	50	0
(England)	DF	Matt Carragher	12 (6)	0	0 (1)	0	2	0	12 (7)	0
(Spain)	MF	Isidro Díaz	26 (13)	6	0 (1)	0	0 (1)	0	26 (15)	6
(England)	DF	Colin Greenall	46	2	1	0	2 (1)	1	49 (1)	3
(England)	DF	Gavin Johnson	37	3	1	0	3	0	41	3
(England)	FW	Graeme Jones	39 (1)	31	1	0	2 (1)	2	42 (2)	33
(England)	MF	Ian Kilford	24 (11)	8	0	0	2 (1)	0	26 (12)	8
(England)	DF	Ryan Kirby	5 (1)	0	0	0	0	0	5 (1)	0
(England)	FW	Graham Lancashire	15 (9)	9	0	0	2	4	17 (9)	13
(England)	DF	Michael Love	0 (3)	0	0	0	0	0	0 (3)	0
(England)	FW	David Lowe	31 (11)	6	1	0	3	0	35 (11)	6
(Spain)	MF	Roberto Martínez	38 (5)	4	1	0	2 (1)	1	41 (6)	5
(Northern Ireland)	DF	Pat McGibbon	10	1	0	0	0	0	10	1
(England)	DF	Steve Morgan	18 (5)	1	0	0	3	0	21 (5)	1
(Republic of Ireland)	DF	Roy O'Brien	0	0	0	0	0	0	0	0
(Republic of Ireland)	DF	John Pender	27 (2)	0	1	0	3	0	31 (2)	0
(England)	MF	Paul Rogers	18 (2)	3	0	0	0	0	18 (2)	3
(England)	FW	Andy Saville	17 (3)	4	1	0	1	0	19 (3)	4
(Spain)	MF	Jesús Seba	0 (1)	0	0	0	0 (1)	0	0 (2)	0
(England)	DF	Kevin Sharp	30 (5)	2	1	0	1 (1)	0	32 (6)	2
(England)	MF	Mark Ward	5	0	0	0	0	0	5	0
(England)	MF	Stuart Whittaker	2 (1)	0	0	0	0	0	2 (1)	0
