= 2000–01 Wigan Athletic F.C. season =

Wigan Athletic
2000–01 season
- Chairman: Dave Whelan
- Manager: Bruce Rioch (until 27 February 2001); Colin Greenall (caretaker until 4 April); Steve Bruce (from 4 April)
- Stadium: JJB Stadium
- Second Division: 6th (qualified for play-offs)
- Play-offs: Semi-finals
- FA Cup: Second round
- League Cup: Second round
- Football League Trophy: Second round
- Top goalscorer: Simon Haworth (11)
- Average home league attendance: 6,774

During the 2000–01 English football season, Wigan Athletic F.C. competed in the Football League Second Division.

== Season summary ==
John Benson left after the end of the previous season, and former Arsenal manager Bruce Rioch was appointed in his place. Rioch had Wigan challenging for a play-off place but left in February; Wigan claimed that Rioch resigned, but Rioch insisted that he had been sacked. Former Manchester United player Steve Bruce took over and cemented Wigan's place in the top six, but they were knocked out of the play-offs by Reading in the semi-finals. Bruce then left to take charge of First Division Crystal Palace. Former Wigan striker Paul Jewell, who had previously led Bradford City to promotion to the Premier League but had failed to replicate the feat with Sheffield Wednesday, was appointed as his replacement.

Defender Arjan de Zeeuw was named Wigan's player of the season.

== Transfers ==
=== In ===
No.	Player	Position	From	Fee	Date	Notes
10	Lee Ashcroft	FW	Grimsby Town	£350,000	4 August 2000	
19	Stefan Bidstrup	MF	Lyngby	£450,000	November 2000	
20	Ferdino Hernandez	DF	AZ Alkmaar	Free	November 2000	
20	Ged Brannan	MF	Motherwell	£175,000	16 February 2001	
37	Steve McMillan	DF	Motherwell	£550,000	2 March 2001	
38	Lee McCulloch	FW	Motherwell	£750,000	2 March 2001	

=== Out ===
No.	Player	Position	To	Fee	Date	Notes
33	Kevin Pilkington	GK	Mansfield Town	Free	September 2000	
20	Andy Porter	MF	Chester City	Free	October 2000	
32	Neil Redfearn	MF	Halifax Town	Free	15 March 2001	
2	Carl Bradshaw	DF	Scunthorpe United	Released	21 May 2001	
5	Stuart Balmer	DF	Oldham Athletic	Released	21 May 2001	
11	Gino Padula	MF	Queens Park Rangers	Released	21 May 2001	
15	Gareth Griffiths	DF	Rochdale	Released	21 May 2001	
16	Roberto Martínez	MF	Motherwell	Released	21 May 2001	
22	Darren Sheridan	MF	Oldham Athletic	Released	21 May 2001	
23	Andrew Morris	MF		Released	21 May 2001	
28	Francis McMahon	DF		Released	21 May 2001	
36	Peter Beagrie	MF	Scunthorpe United	Released	21 May 2001	
19	Stefan Bidstrup	MF	AaB	Contract terminated	22 May 2001	

=== Loans in ===
No.	Player	Pos	From	Date	Duration	Notes
33	Alex O'Reilly	GK	West Ham United	November 2000	One month	
29	Keith Gillespie	MF	Blackburn Rovers	2 December 2000	One month	
33	Andy Marriott	GK	Sunderland	1 January 2001	Two months	
32	Paul Dalglish	FW	Norwich City	22 March 2001	End of season	
33	Raffaele Nuzzo	GK	Reggiana	March 2001	End of season	

=== Loans out ===
No.	Player	Pos	To	Date	Duration	Notes
24	Paul Mitchell	DF	Halifax Town	22 March 2001	End of season	

== Pre-season ==
Date	Opponent	Venue	Result	Scorers	Notes
20 July 2000	Leigh RMI	A	1–1		
25 July 2000	Bari	A	0–0		
29 July 2000	Treviso	A	3–3		
2 August 2000	Hudddersfield Town	H	1–2		
5 August 2000	Carlisle United	A	3–1		

== League ==
=== Results ===
Wigan Athletic's score comes first

Legend

Win	Draw	Loss

Game	Date	Opponent	Venue	Result	Attendance	Scorers	Notes
1	12 August 2000	Swansea City	A	0–0	8,391		
2	19 August 2000	Luton Town	H	2–1	6,518	McGibbon, Liddell	
3	26 August 2000	Wrexham	A	3–1	5,271	Liddell, Haworth, de Zeeuw	
4	2 September 2000	Walsall	A	0–2	7,156		
5	9 September 2000	Colchester United	H	3–1	5,782	Haworth (3)	
6	12 September 2000	Peterborough United	H	1–0	4,798	Kilford	
7	16 September 2000	Bristol Rovers	A	0–0	8,109		
8	23 September 2000	Northampton Town	H	2–1	6,294	Haworth, Liddell	
9	30 September 2000	Swindon Town	A	2–2	4,895	Haworth, Green	
10	6 October 2000	Reading	H	1–1	7,021	Bradshaw	
11	14 October 2000	Notts County	A	2–2	4,567	Roberts, Redfearn (pen)	
12	17 October 2000	Bournemouth	A	0–0	3,035		
13	21 October 2000	Port Vale	H	1–0	6,275	Liddell	
14	24 October 2000	Oxford United	A	2–0	4,030	Green, Liddell	
15	28 October 2000	Bury	H	1–0	6,622	Kilford	
16	4 November 2000	Rotherham United	A	1–1	6,192	Griffiths	
17	7 November 2000	Millwall	H	1–0	5,822	Liddell	
18	11 November 2000	Cambridge United	H	2–1	6,537	Roberts, Wanless (own goal)	
19	25 November 2000	Bristol City	A	1–1	12,708	Carey (own goal)	
20	2 December 2000	Brentford	A	2–2	4,144	Ashcroft (2)	
21	16 December 2000	Wycombe Wanderers	H	2–1	5,779	Haworth, Roberts	
22	23 December 2000	Stoke City	H	1–1	8,957	Gunnarsson (own goal)	
23	26 December 2000	Oldham Athletic	A	1–2	7,750	Haworth	
24	30 December 2000	Luton Town	A	2–0	5,332	Haworth, Bidstrup	
25	1 January 2001	Wrexham	H	0–0	6,515		
26	6 January 2001	Swansea City	H	2–0	5,571	Liddell (2)	
27	13 January 2001	Millwall	A	1–3	15,317	Roberts	
28	20 January 2001	Oldham Athletic	H	3–1	8,274	Ashcroft, Redfearn (2)	
29	27 January 2001	Stoke City	A	0–2	16,859		
30	2 February 2001	Walsall	H	1–1	9,586	Ashcroft	
31	10 February 2001	Colchester United	A	2–0	3,275	Bidstrup, Liddell	
32	17 February 2001	Bristol Rovers	H	0–0	7,271		
33	20 February 2001	Peterborough United	A	0–2	4,111		
34	24 February 2001	Northampton Town	A	0–1	5,571		
35	3 March 2001	Swindon Town	H	0–0	6,563		
36	6 March 2001	Notts County	H	1–1	5,021	Bradshaw (pen)	
37	9 March 2001	Reading	A	0–1	12,307		
38	17 March 2001	Bournemouth	H	1–1	5,878	McGibbon	
39	24 March 2001	Port Vale	A	0–0	5,017		
40	31 March 2001	Wycombe Wanderers	A	2–1	4,939	McCulloch, Beagrie	
41	7 April 2001	Brentford	H	1–3	6,502	Haworth	
42	14 April 2001	Oxford United	H	3–2	5,322	Haworth, Ashcroft (pen), McCulloch	
43	16 April 2001	Bury	A	1–0	4,915	Balmer	
44	21 April 2001	Rotherham United	H	0–2	8,836		
45	28 April 2001	Cambridge United	A	2–1	4,776	McCulloch, Bradshaw (pen)	
46	5 May 2001	Bristol City	H	0–0	10,048		

=== Final league table ===
Pos	Team	Pld	W	D	L	GF	GA	GD	Pts	Qualification or relegation
4	Walsall (O, P)	46	23	12	11	79	50	+29	81	Qualification for the Second Division play-offs
5	Stoke City	46	21	14	11	74	49	+25	77	Qualification for the Second Division play-offs
6	Wigan Athletic	46	19	18	9	53	42	+11	75	Qualification for the Second Division play-offs
7	Bournemouth	46	20	13	13	79	55	+24	73	
8	Notts County	46	19	12	15	62	66	−4	69	

Rules for classification: 1) Points; 2) Goal difference; 3) Goals scored
(O) Play-off winners; (P) Promoted

=== Second Division play-offs ===
Round	Date	Opponent	Venue	Result	Attendance	Goalscorers	Notes
Semi-final (1st leg)	13 May 2001	Reading	H	0–0	12,638		
Semi-final (2nd leg)	16 May 2001	Reading	A	1–2	22,034	Nicholls	
Wigan lost 1–2 on aggregate

== Cups ==
=== FA Cup ===
Round	Date	Opponent	Venue	Result	Attendance	Goalscorers	Notes
First	18 November 2000	Dorchester Town	H	3–1	3,883	Roberts, Bidstrup, McIvor (own goal)	
Second	12 December 2000	Notts County	H	1–1	3,886	Ashcroft	
Second (replay)	19 December 2000	Notts County	A	1–2 (a.e.t.)	3,349	Kilford	

=== League Cup ===
Round	Date	Opponent	Venue	Result	Attendance	Goalscorers	Notes
First (1st leg)	22 August 2000	Scunthorpe United	H	1–0	2,725	Roberts	
First (2nd leg)	5 September 2000	Scunthorpe United	A	4–1	2,062	Sharp, Kilford, Haworth, Liddell	
Wigan won 5–1 on aggregate
Second (1st leg)	19 September 2000	Wimbledon	A	0–0	1,941		
Second (2nd leg)	26 September 2000	Wimbledon	H	1–2	5,387	Haworth	
Wigan lost 1–2 on aggregate

=== Football League Trophy ===
Round	Date	Opponent	Venue	Result	Attendance	Goalscorers	Notes
First (Northern)	9 January 2001	Oldham Athletic	A	3–2 (a.e.t.)	2,551	McLaughlin, McLoughlin (2)	
Second (Northern)	30 January 2001	Walsall	A	1–2	3,436	Padula	

== Squad ==
Squad at end of season

Note: Flags indicate national team as defined under FIFA eligibility rules; some limited exceptions apply. Players may hold more than one non-FIFA nationality.

No.	Pos.	Nation	Player
1	GK	NIR	Roy Carroll
2	DF	ENG	Carl Bradshaw
3	DF	ENG	Kevin Sharp
4	DF	NIR	Pat McGibbon
5	DF	SCO	Stuart Balmer
6	DF	NED	Arjan de Zeeuw
7	MF	SCO	Andy Liddell
8	MF	ENG	Kevin Nicholls
9	FW	WAL	Simon Haworth
10	FW	ENG	Lee Ashcroft
11	DF	ARG	Gino Padula
12	FW	WAL	Neil Roberts
13	GK	SCO	Derek Stillie
14	DF	ENG	Scott Green
15	DF	ENG	Gareth Griffiths
16	MF	ESP	Roberto Martínez
17	DF	IRL	Hugh Dickson
18	MF	ENG	Ian Kilford
19	MF	DEN	Stefan Bidstrup

No.	Pos.	Nation	Player
20	MF	ENG	Ged Brannan
21	MF	SCO	Brian McLaughlin
22	MF	ENG	Darren Sheridan
23	MF	ENG	Andrew Morris
24	DF	ENG	Paul Mitchell
25	DF	ENG	Tom Spearitt
26	MF	ENG	Ian Johnson
27	GK	ENG	Lee Ellis
28	DF	ENG	Francis McMahon
29	MF	ENG	Joel Johnson
30	DF	ENG	Ben Kay
31	MF	ENG	Craig Cunningham
32	FW	SCO	Paul Dalglish (on loan from Norwich City)
33	GK	ITA	Raffaele Nuzzo (on loan from Reggina)
34	MF	ENG	Alan McLoughlin
35	MF	ENG	Gary Rae
36	MF	ENG	Peter Beagrie
37	DF	SCO	Steve McMillan
38	FW	SCO	Lee McCulloch

=== Left club during season ===
Note: Flags indicate national team as defined under FIFA eligibility rules; some limited exceptions apply. Players may hold more than one non-FIFA nationality.

No.	Pos.	Nation	Player
20	MF	ANT	Ferdino Hernandez (released)
29	MF	NIR	Keith Gillespie (on loan from Blackburn Rovers)
32	MF	ENG	Neil Redfearn (to Halifax Town)

No.	Pos.	Nation	Player
33	GK	ENG	Kevin Pilkington (to Mansfield Town)
33	GK	ENG	Alex O'Reilly (on loan from West Ham United)
33	GK	WAL	Andy Marriott (on loan from Sunderland)
