= 1999–2000 Wigan Athletic F.C. season =

Wigan Athletic
1999–2000 season
- Chairman: Dave Whelan
- Manager: John Benson
- Stadium: JJB Stadium
- Second Division: 4th
- FA Cup: Third round
- League Cup: Second round
- Football League Trophy: Second round
- Top goalscorer: Barlow (18)
- Average home league attendance: 7,007

During the 1999–2000 English football season, Wigan Athletic F.C. competed in the Football League Second Division.

== Season summary ==
On 1 June 1999, John Benson was appointed as Wigan's manager. As Wigan settled into their new home at the JJB Stadium, Benson's side went 26 league games undefeated, before losing at home to Oldham Athletic on 7 January 2000, Benson picking up 2 Manager of the Month awards in the process. Towards the end of the season Wigan lost their form and found themselves in the play-off final at Wembley against Gillingham. A few days prior to the game, Benson had announced he was stepping down but remained to lead his team out at Wembley and ultimately a 3–2 defeat after being 2–1 up with only 7 minutes of extra time remaining.

== Transfers ==
=== In ===
No.	Player	Position	From	Fee	Date	Notes
8	Kevin Nicholls	MF	Charlton Athletic	£600,000	22 June 1999	
21	Brian McLaughlin	MF	Dundee United	Free	24 June 1999	
6	Arjan De Zeeuw	DF	Barnsley	Free	3 July 1999	
22	Darren Sheridan	MF	Barnsley	Free	3 July 1999	
13	Derek Stillie	GK	Aberdeen	Free	30 July 1999	
25	Mark Bowen	DF	Charlton Athletic	Free	15 August 1999	
29	Jeff Peron	MF	Portsmouth	Free	30 November 1999	
34	Alan McLoughlin	MF	Portsmouth	£250,000	30 November 1999	
12	Neil Roberts	FW	Wrexham	£400,000	18 February 2000	
32	Neil Redfearn	MF	Bradford City	£112,500	18 March 2000	

=== Out ===
No.	Player	Position	To	Fee	Date	Notes
12	Graeme Jones	FW	St Johnstone	£100,000	19 November 1999	
25	Mark Bowen	DF	Reading	Free	7 December 1999	
30	Scott Willis	MF	Mansfield Town	Free	25 March 2000	
26	Colin Greenall	DF	Retired		30 June 2000	

== Final league table ==
Pos	Team	Pld	W	D	L	GF	GA	GD	Pts	Promotion or relegation
2	Burnley (P)	46	25	13	8	69	47	+22	88	Promotion to the First Division
3	Gillingham (O, P)	46	25	10	11	79	48	+31	85	Qualification for the Second Division play-offs
4	Wigan Athletic	46	22	17	7	72	38	+34	83	Qualification for the Second Division play-offs
5	Millwall	46	23	13	10	76	50	+26	82	Qualification for the Second Division play-offs
6	Stoke City	46	23	13	10	68	42	+26	82	Qualification for the Second Division play-offs

Rules for classification: 1) Points; 2) Goal difference; 3) Goals scored
(O) Play-off winners; (P) Promoted

== Results ==
Wigan Athletic's score comes first

Legend

Win	Draw	Loss

=== Pre-season ===
Date	Opponent	Venue	Result	Scorers	Notes
17 July 1999	St Johnstone	N	1–1 (won 5–3 on pens)		(Note: Motorola Cup game)
18 July 1999	Livingston	A	1–4		
21 July 1999	Dunfermline Athletic	A	1–2		
24 July 1999	Chester City	A	1–1		
29 July 1999	Macclesfield Town	A	2–1		
1 August 1999	Morecambe	H	0–0		
4 August 1999	Manchester United	H	0–2		

=== Football League Second Division ===
Date	Opponent	Venue	Result	Attendance	Scorers	Notes
7 August 1999	Scunthorpe United	H	3–0	7,481	Haworth (2), Barlow (pen)	
14 August 1999	Millwall	A	3–3	8,165	Liddell, Balmer, Barlow	
21 August 1999	Bristol City	H	2–1	7,103	Barlow, Haworth	
28 August 1999	Preston North End	A	4–1	13,885	Barlow (3, 1 pen), Haworth	
30 August 1999	Cambridge United	H	1–1	5,976	McGibbon	
11 September 1999	Bristol Rovers	H	3–1	6,927	Sheridan, Barlow, Haworth	
18 September 1999	Stoke City	A	1–1	11,195	Mohan (own goal)	
25 September 1999	Cardiff City	A	0–0	7,679		
2 October 1999	Luton Town	H	1–0	6,866	Barlow	
16 October 1999	Reading	A	2–0	7,708	Barlow, Bradshaw (pen)	
19 October 1999	Wrexham	A	1–1	3,392	Martínez	
23 October 1999	Cardiff City	H	2–0	5,728	Martínez, Kilford	
26 October 1999	Colchester United	A	2–2	2,915	Barlow, Liddell	
2 November 1999	Chesterfield	H	3–0	4,376	Liddell, Barlow (2, 1 pen)	
6 November 1999	Blackpool	A	2–2	4,535	Jones, Barlow	
12 November 1999	Wycombe Wanderers	H	2–1	5,523	Barlow, Balmer	
16 November 1999	Bournemouth	H	3–1	4,338	Green, de Zeeuw, Barlow	
23 November 1999	Bury	A	2–2	4,086	Barlow, Haworth	
27 November 1999	Burnley	H	1–1	11,986 (6,546 away)	Haworth	
4 December 1999	Scunthorpe United	A	2–1	3,463	Liddell, Martínez	
18 December 1999	Brentford	H	1–0	5,498	de Zeeuw	
26 December 1999	Notts County	A	2–0	8,176	O'Neill, Liddell	
28 December 1999	Gillingham	H	2–0	8,054	McLoughlin, Sheridan	
3 January 2000	Oxford United	A	2–1	5,915	Haworth (2)	
7 January 2000	Oldham Athletic	H	0–1	6,487		
15 January 2000	Millwall	H	1–1	6,304	O'Neill	
22 January 2000	Bristol City	A	0–0	10,758		
5 February 2000	Cambridge United	A	1–1	3,755	Barlow	
12 February 2000	Colchester United	H	0–1	6,022		
19 February 2000	Burnley	A	0–0	20,435		
26 February 2000	Stoke City	H	1–2	9,429	Green	
4 March 2000	Bristol Rovers	A	1–1	11,109	Liddell	
7 March 2000	Blackpool	H	5–1	6,451	Liddell, Griffiths, Haworth, Barlow, Sheridan	
11 March 2000	Chesterfield	A	1–1	3,106	Cooke	
18 March 2000	Bury	H	1–0	6,567	Liddell	
21 March 2000	Wycombe Wanderers	A	2–0	3,821	de Zeeuw, Haworth	
25 March 2000	Notts County	H	2–0	6,094	Redfearn (2, 1 pen)	
1 April 2000	Brentford	A	2–0	4,479	Redfearn (pen), Powell (own goal)	
4 April 2000	Preston North End	H	0–1	15,993		
8 April 2000	Oxford United	H	2–0	4,848	Haworth (2)	
11 April 2000	Oldham Athletic	A	1–2	5,697	Redfearn (pen)	
15 April 2000	Gillingham	A	1–2	7,746	Pennock (own goal)	
22 April 2000	Reading	H	1–0	5,855	Redfearn (pen)	
24 April 2000	Luton Town	A	1–1	5,010	Redfearn (pen)	
29 April 2000	Wrexham	H	0–1	7,245		
6 May 2000	Bournemouth	A	2–2	6,512	McGibbon, Roberts	

=== Second Division play-offs ===
Round	Date	Opponent	Venue	Result	Attendance	Goalscorers	Notes
Semi-final (1st leg)	13 May 2000	Millwall	A	0–0	14,091		
Semi-final (2nd leg)	17 May 2000	Millwall	H	1–0	10,642	Sheridan	
Final	28 May 2000	Gillingham	N	2–3 (a.e.t.)	53,764	Haworth, Barlow (pen)	

=== FA Cup ===
Round	Date	Opponent	Venue	Result	Attendance	Goalscorers
First	30 October 1999	Cambridge City	A	2–0	4,024 (337 away)	Barlow (2)
Second	20 November 1999	Wycombe Wanderers	A	2–2	2,992 (294 away)	Haworth (2)
Second (replay)	30 November 1999	Wycombe Wanderers	H	2–1	3,967	Liddell, Haworth
Third	11 December 1999	Wolverhampton Wanderers	H	0–1	10,531	

=== League Cup ===
Round	Date	Opponent	Venue	Result	Attendance	Goalscorers
First (1st leg)	10 August 1999	York City	A	1–0	1,921 (1,063 away)	Haworth
First (2nd leg)	24 August 1999	York City	H	2–1 (won 3–1 on agg)	3,396	Barlow (2, 1 pen)
Second (1st leg)	14 September 1999	Watford	A	0–2	6,628 (598 away)	
Second (2nd leg)	21 September 1999	Watford	H	3–1 (lost on away goals)	5,006	Haworth (2), Bradshaw (pen)

=== Football League Trophy ===
Round	Date	Opponent	Venue	Result	Attendance	Goalscorers
First (Northern)	7 December 1999	Burnley	H	2–1 (a.e.t.)	2,085	Bradshaw (pen), Morris
Second (Northern)	25 January 2000	Carlisle United	A	1–2	1,321 (320 away)	Martínez

== Squad ==
Note: Flags indicate national team as defined under FIFA eligibility rules; some limited exceptions apply. Players may hold more than one non-FIFA nationality.

No.	Pos.	Nation	Player
1	GK	NIR	Roy Carroll
2	DF	ENG	Carl Bradshaw
3	DF	ENG	Kevin Sharp
4	DF	NIR	Pat McGibbon
5	DF	SCO	Stuart Balmer
6	DF	NED	Arjan de Zeeuw
7	FW	SCO	Andy Liddell
8	MF	ENG	Kevin Nicholls
9	FW	WAL	Simon Haworth
10	MF	NIR	Michael O'Neill
11	FW	ENG	Stuart Barlow
12	FW	WAL	Neil Roberts
13	GK	SCO	Derek Stillie
14	DF	ENG	Scott Green
15	DF	ENG	Gareth Griffiths
16	MF	ESP	Roberto Martínez
17	DF	ENG	Neil Fitzhenry

No.	Pos.	Nation	Player
18	MF	ENG	Ian Kilford
19	MF	ENG	David Lee
20	MF	ENG	Andy Porter
21	MF	SCO	Brian McLaughlin
22	MF	ENG	Darren Sheridan
23	MF	ENG	Andrew Morris
24	DF	ENG	Paul Mitchell
25	DF	ENG	Tom Spearitt
26	DF	ENG	Colin Greenall
27	GK	ENG	Lee Ellis
28	MF	ENG	Stephen Greenwood
29	MF	FRA	Jean-François Péron
31	MF	ENG	Terry Cooke (on loan from Manchester City)
32	MF	ENG	Neil Redfearn
33	DF	ENG	Michael Clegg (on loan from Manchester United)
34	MF	IRL	Alan McLoughlin

=== Left club during season ===
Note: Flags indicate national team as defined under FIFA eligibility rules; some limited exceptions apply. Players may hold more than one non-FIFA nationality.

No.	Pos.	Nation	Player
12	FW	ENG	Graeme Jones (to St Johnstone)
25	DF	WAL	Mark Bowen (to Reading)

No.	Pos.	Nation	Player
30	MF	ENG	Scott Willis (to Mansfield Town)
