= Isidro Díaz =

Isidro Díaz can mean

- Isidro Díaz, Secretary of the Interior (Mexico) in 1860
- Isidro Díaz (footballer, born 1954), Spanish football forward
- Isidro Díaz (footballer, born 1972), Spanish football left midfielder
