= Tony Black (footballer) =

English footballer (born 1969)

Personal information
- Full name: Anthony Paul Black
- Date of birth: 15 July 1970 (age 56)
- Place of birth: Barrow-in-Furness, Cumbria, England
- Height: 5 ft 9 in (1.75 m)
- Positions: Winger; striker

Senior career*
Years	Team	Apps	(Gls)
1990–199?	Burnley Dynamos	?	(?)
199?–1994	Burnley United	?	(?)
1994–1995	Bamber Bridge	?	(?)
1995–1997	Wigan Athletic	31	(2)
1998	Accrington Stanley	?	(?)
1998–1999	Chorley	?	(?)
1999–2002	Leigh RMI	71	(19)
2002	Accrington Stanley	?	(?)
2003	Stalybridge Celtic	4	(0)
- * Club domestic league appearances and goals

Anthony Paul Black (born 15 July 1969) is an English retired footballer who played as a winger and striker.

== Career ==
=== Early career ===
Black played in the Pendle Charity League for amateur club Burnley Dynamos in 1990. He played as striker and helped Dynamos to promotion in the club's inception year. He also helped the club lift a 2nd division trophy cup, scoring 2 goals in the semi-final and one in the final. After a short time with Dynamos, he moved to Burnley United of the West Lancashire Football League.

=== Wigan Athletic ===
Football League Third Division club Wigan Athletic signed Black for £12,500 on 22 March 1995. On 29 March, he made his debut for the club, playing the whole 90 minutes in a 1–1 draw with Hereford United at Springfield Park. Black went on to make a further eight appearances in the remainder of the season, starting every game he played, but not managing to score any goals.

On 2 December, in a FA Cup second round tie, Black scored his first goals for Wigan, netting two goals against his hometown club Barrow in a 4–0 win at Holker Street. Soon afterwards, he broke his leg while playing for Wigan and retired on medical advice nearly two years later after failing to regain full fitness. However, he continued to play non-league football for several years and also started a new career as a chef.

=== Accrington Stanley ===
Black signed for Northern Premier League club Accrington Stanley in January 1998.

=== Leigh RMI ===
In March 1999, Black signed for Northern Premier League club Leigh RMI from Chorley. On 13 March, he made his debut for the Railwaymen, scoring the opening goal in a 3–2 league win against Altrincham. Three days later, he scored the winning goal in a President's Cup semi-final first-leg at Hilton Park, giving RMI a 1–0 aggregate lead over Runcorn. On 3 April, Black scored against his former club as Leigh beat Accrington Stanley 2–1 in the league. He scored in the President's Cup final on 15 April, however, RMI lost 2–1 to Droylsden on the night. Black scored in the final league game of the 1998–99 season, netting in a 3–1 win against Gateshead, the result secured eighth spot in the league which guaranteed Leigh a place in the following season's President's Cup.

On 24 August, Black scored his first goal of the 1999–2000 season, he opened the scoring in a 3–0 win against his former club Bamber Bridge. The win, at Hilton Park, gave RMI their fourth consecutive win of the season, and maintained their two-point lead at the top of the league. He scored a brace in a 4–2 league win against Frickley Athletic on 7 September. Black followed that up by scoring both goals in a 2–0 Challenge Cup win at Radcliffe Borough on 12 October. On 4 February 2000, he scored two-goals in a 3–2 win against bottom club Winsford United, the result gave Leigh a plush cushion at the top of the league. He helped RMI gain promotion to the Football Conference, scoring 18 league goals on the way to winning the title.

Black had a successful season with The Railwaymen, scoring 12 league goals that went a long way to firing RMI to a fifth-place finish in the Conference, the club's highest ever league finish.

The following season, RMI were in a relegation fight and Black was forced down the pecking order at the club with the arrival of Dino Maamria and Michael Twiss. Despite this, Black still managed 6 league goals which helped RMI to safety.

=== Accrington Stanley ===
Black signed on for a second spell at Accrington Stanley on 27 September 2002, stating that the Northern Premier League club interested him because it was closer to his home in Burnley. Initially, he thought about quitting football because of work and family commitments, but claimed he would miss it too much and he wanted to play as long as he could. On 2 October, Black made his second debut for Stanley, playing in a 4–2 win against Burscough at the Crown Ground. He was released by Accrington on 23 December, less than two months after he signed for the club.

=== Stalybridge Celtic ===
In January 2003, Black signed for Northern Premier League club Stalybridge Celtic. On 18 January, he made his debut for Celtic, coming off the bench in a 4–1 league win against Ashton United at Bower Fold. Two more substitute appearances followed, in the 1–0 wins against Burscough and Gateshead, before Black made his first start for Stalybridge in a 1–0 defeat against Runcorn. This turned out to be his last appearance for the club, Celtic manager Dave Miller agreed to release Black from his contract in March 2003.

== Career statistics ==
Club	Season	Division	League		FA Cup		League Cup		FL Trophy		Total	
Club	Season	Division	Apps	Goals	Apps	Goals	Apps	Goals	Apps	Goals	Apps	Goals
Wigan Athletic	1994–95	Third Division	9	0	0	0	0	0	0	0	9	0
Wigan Athletic	1995–96	Third Division	21	2	2	2	0	0	1	0	24	4
Wigan Athletic	1996–97	Third Division	0	0	0	0	0	0	0	0	0	0
Wigan Athletic	1997–98	Second Division	1	0	0	0	1	0	0	0	2	0
Wigan Athletic	Total		31	2	2	2	1	0	1	0	35	4
Career Total			31	2	2	2	1	0	1	0	35	4

== Honours ==
=== Club ===
Leigh RMI

- President's Cup runner-up (1): 1998–99
- Northern Premier League Premier Division (1): 1999–2000

=== Individual ===
- Football Conference Goalscorer of the Month (1): October 2000
