= Scott Willis =

Scott Willis may refer to:

- Scott Willis (footballer)
- Scott Willis (politician)
