= Stuart Whittaker =

English footballer

Personal information
- Full name: Stuart Whittaker
- Date of birth: 2 January 1975 (age 51)
- Place of birth: Liverpool, England
- Position: Midfielder

Senior career*
Years	Team	Apps	(Gls)
1992–1993	Liverpool	0	(0)
1993–1997	Bolton Wanderers	3	(0)
1996	→ Wigan Athletic (loan)	3	(0)
1997–2000	Macclesfield Town	67	(5)
2000–2002	Southport	36	(5)
2002	Chester City	7	(4)
2003	Leigh RMI	15	(3)
2003–2006	Nuneaton Borough	59	(4)
2006–2007	Vauxhall Motors	17	(2)
2007–2008	Leigh RMI	14	(1)
2008–	Stafford Rangers	10	(0)
Total		231	(24)
- * Club domestic league appearances and goals

Stuart Whittaker (born 2 January 1975) is an English former professional footballer who played in The Football League for Bolton Wanderers, Wigan Athletic, Macclesfield Town, Chester City and Nuneaton Borough.
