= Neil Fitzhenry =

English footballer

Personal information
- Date of birth: 24 September 1978 (age 48)
- Place of birth: Billinge, England
- Position: Defender

Senior career*
| Years | Team | Apps | (Gls) |
| 1997–2000 | Wigan Athletic | 4 | (0) |
| 2000 | Chester | | |
| 2000–2002 | Finn Harps | 26 | (0) |
| 2002–2003 | Leigh Genesis | 37 | (0) |
| 2005–2011 | Southport | | |
- * Club domestic league appearances and goals

Neil Fitzhenry (born 24 September 1978) is an English retired footballer.
