= Ferdino Hernandez =

Netherlands Antilles footballer (born 1971)

Personal information
- Full name: Ferdino Francio Hernandez
- Date of birth: 25 May 1971 (age 55)
- Place of birth: Amersfoort, Netherlands
- Height: 1.80 m (5 ft 11 in)
- Position: Midfielder

Senior career*
Years	Team	Apps	(Gls)
1993–1998	FC Utrecht	81	(11)
1998–2000	AZ	31	(3)
2000	Wigan Athletic	0	(0)
2001	Hapoel Kfar-Saba	8	(3)
2001–2003	SC Cambuur	19	(0)
2003–2006	ADO'20		

International career
2004	Netherlands Antilles	4	(0)
- * Club domestic league appearances and goals

Ferdino Francio Hernandez (born 25 May 1971) is a Netherlands Antilles former footballer.

Hernandez was born in Amersfoort. He made over 100 appearances in the Eredivisie before moving to England in 2000. After trials with Barnsley, Hearts and Dunfermline Athletic, he signed a three-month contract with Wigan Athletic in November 2000. His only appearance for the club came in a 3–1 win against Dorchester Town in the FA Cup before leaving the club by mutual consent in December 2000.

Hernandez played at the international level four times for Netherlands Antilles.
