= Michael Love (footballer) =

English footballer

Personal information
- Full name: Michael John Love
- Date of birth: 27 November 1973 (age 52)
- Place of birth: Stockport, England
- Height: 5 ft 11 in (1.80 m)
- Position: Defender

Senior career*
Years	Team	Apps	(Gls)
1994–1996	Hinckley Athletic		
1996–1997	Wigan Athletic	3	(0)
1997	Wycombe Wanderers		
1997	Sligo Rovers	7	(0)
1997–2000	Stevenage Borough	123	(12)
2000	Tamworth		
2000–2006	Nuneaton Borough	117	(1)
2006–2007	Hinckley United	41	(0)
2007–2008	Brackley Town		
2008–2009	Stratford Town		
2009	Shepshed Dynamo		
2009–2010	Rugby Town		
2010–2011	Barwell		
- * Club domestic league appearances and goals

Michael John Love (born 27 November 1973) is an English footballer who most recently played for Northern Premier League Division One South side Barwell, where he played as a defender. Now a coach in and around the Midlands, and current coach with the University of Warwick Men's Football Club.

== Playing career ==
He made a total of 9 appearances for Sligo.
