= Jorg Smeets =

Dutch footballer

Personal information
- Date of birth: 5 November 1970 (age 55)
- Place of birth: Bussum, Netherlands
- Position: Midfielder

Senior career*
Years	Team	Apps	(Gls)
1991–1996	FC Volendam	103	(22)
1996	FC Utrecht	14	(1)
1996–1997	Heracles Almelo	25	(10)
1997–1999	Wigan Athletic	43	(6)
1999	→ Chester City (loan)	3	(0)
1999–2000	Marítimo	16	(1)
2000–2001	Helmond Sport	4	(0)
- * Club domestic league appearances and goals

Jorg Smeets (born 5 November 1970, in Bussum) is a Dutch former footballer who played as a midfielder.

After ending his playing career, Smeets coached a number of clubs in the Dutch lower leagues, including NVC Naarden, HSV De Zuidvogels, Ajax amateurs and SV Hoofddorp. He also spent time abroad as Head of Youth Development at Chinese club Guangzhou R&F F.C.
