= Jesús Seba =

Spanish footballer

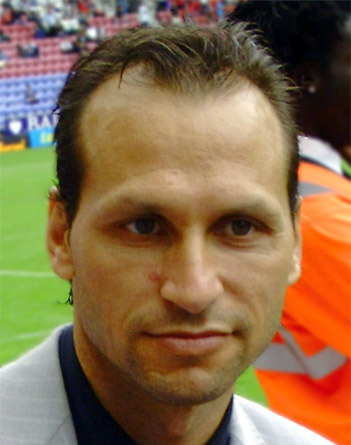
- Seba in 2009

Personal information
- Full name: Jesús Seba Hernández
- Date of birth: 11 April 1974 (age 52)
- Place of birth: Zaragoza, Spain
- Height: 1.72 m (5 ft 7 1/2 in)
- Position: Forward

Youth career
- 1989–1990: Miralbueno
- 1990–1991: Oliver

Senior career*
Years	Team	Apps	(Gls)
1991–1994	Zaragoza B	15	(4)
1992–1995	Zaragoza	18	(2)
1994–1995	→ Villarreal (loan)	21	(1)
1995–1996	Wigan Athletic	21	(3)
1997–1998	Zaragoza B	47	(6)
1997	Zaragoza	1	(0)
1998–1999	Chaves	31	(10)
1999–2002	Belenenses	66	(10)
2002–2003	Orihuela	26	(2)
2003–2005	Palencia	58	(3)
2005–2009	Andorra CF	94	(22)
2009–2010	Oliver		

International career
1992–1993	Spain U21	3	(1)
2002–2006	Aragon	2	(0)
- * Club domestic league appearances and goals

Jesús Seba Hernández (born 11 April 1974) is a Spanish former professional footballer who played mostly as a forward.

Mostly associated to Real Zaragoza, he was also known as one of the Three Amigos, the collective name given to the first three Spanish players to play in the English Football League as he had signed with Wigan Athletic. He also played in Portugal with Chaves and Belenenses.

== Club career ==
=== Zaragoza ===
Seba was born in Zaragoza, Aragon. He made his professional – and La Liga – debut at the age of 18 for local Real Zaragoza, in a 1–1 draw against Real Sociedad. He would garner praise for his early performances, ultimately leading to a call-up for the Spain under-21 team – notably scoring twice against Frem in the 1992–93 UEFA Cup (eventual 6–1 aggregate win).

However, in March 1993, Seba suffered a serious ankle tear when attempting a turn in a Copa del Rey match. The injury would stunt his development and later prove a turning point in his career, as he would figure sparingly in top-flight football in the following seasons.

After a loan in Segunda División with Villarreal, Seba was released by Zaragoza and moved on a free transfer to England's Wigan Athletic, for the start of the 1995–96 campaign.

=== Wigan Athletic ===
Seba came to Wigan as one of the 'Three Amigos', alongside Roberto Martínez – also his teammate at Zaragoza – and Isidro Díaz, drafted in by new chairman Dave Whelan in the summer of 1995; the signings were a real coup for an English Third Division side, especially considering Football League teams rarely searched for talent abroad in the mid-90s and that Seba was also an under-21 international. 'Jesus is a Wiganer' was an early joke at the club, and Spanish flags adorned Springfield Park on matchdays as Spanish fever gripped the town's football supporters.

Seba scored his first goal with his first touch in a pre-season friendly, and played his first competitive game in the season opener against Gillingham. His first official goal arrived in his first match at home (also league), a 2–1 defeat of Scunthorpe United.

Following a series of good results, aided by a string of impressive performances from Seba, Wigan were made early favourites for the championship. Mid-season, however, he found himself on the fringes of the first team, and with their league position only 'satisfactory', Graham Barrow was sacked following a 6–2 loss at Mansfield Town; caretaker manager Frank Lord reinstated the player to the first team, and oversaw a 4–0 win over Exeter City in which the latter scored twice.

Seba was immediately dropped by new manager John Deehan, however, and would later see his appearances limited to mainly substitute roles as he struggled to find form in the latter half of the campaign. He made just two appearances, both from the bench, and played his final game for Wigan on 7 September 1996, 30 minutes against Scunthorpe.

Seba then had trials at Burnley and Bristol Rovers, before being allowed to leave the club by Deehan in October 1996, having started 11 times. He found it most difficult to settle of the three Spaniards, and his struggle to grasp the English language was another contributory factor in his departure.

=== Spain return and Portugal ===
Seba returned to his country and Zaragoza in the 1997 January transfer window, but spent almost two years appearing for the reserve team, only playing for the main squad during the 1–3 home loss to Compostela in the final day of the season. He then had a four-year spell in Portugal, playing for Chaves and Belenenses, where a heart condition whilst with the latter put his career on hold.

Seba eventually recovered, but spent his later years in Segunda División B (Orihuela, Palencia) or lower; during his four-year stint at amateurs Andorra, he served as captain and was a highly popular figure.

After considering retirement at the end of 2008–09, Seba decided to return to Oliver. Upon joining, he expressed his desire to finish his career at the club, where he began more than 20 years earlier.

== International career ==
As well as playing three matches for the Spanish under-21s, Seba appeared twice for the Aragon autonomous side, against Castile and León in 2002 and Chile on 28 December 2006. The latter, a 1–0 victory, was their first fixture against a FIFA-accredited international team.

== Personal life ==
Seba was married with two daughters, and his former teammates Martínez and Xavi Aguado ranked amongst his closest friends.
