= Stefan Bidstrup =

Danish footballer (born 1975)

Personal information
- Full name: Stefan Bidstrup
- Date of birth: 24 February 1975 (age 51)
- Place of birth: Denmark
- Position: Midfielder

Youth career
- 1980–1993: Helsingør IF

Senior career*
| Years | Team | Apps | (Gls) |
| 1994–1996 | Helsingør IF | | |
| 1997–2000 | Lyngby BK | 111 | (13) |
| 2000–2001 | Wigan Athletic | 15 | (2) |
| 2001–2003 | AaB | 62 | (7) |
| 2003–2006 | Viborg FF | 39 | (3) |
| 2010 | Elite 3000 | 2 | (0) |

Managerial career
- 2009: Elite 3000
- * Club domestic league appearances and goals

Stefan Bidstrup (born 24 February 1975) is a Danish former footballer who played as a midfielder.

== Playing career ==
Bidstrup started his career with Helsingør IF before moving to Lyngby BK in 1997. Despite scoring an own goal in his Danish Superliga debut against Brøndby, Bidstrup quickly established himself as a key player in the side, and soon attracted interest from foreign clubs.

In November 2000, he joined Wigan Athletic for a fee of £450,000. He made his debut on 11 November in a 2–1 win against Cambridge United, and scored his first goal a week later in the FA Cup in a 3–1 win against Dorchester Town. Due to constant injury problems, Bidstrup made just 15 league appearances for Wigan before being released in the summer of 2001.

He then signed for Aalborg BK, and spent the rest of his career in Denmark before retiring in 2006.
