= Ian Kilford =

English footballer

Personal information
- Full name: Ian Antony Kilford
- Date of birth: 6 October 1973 (age 53)
- Place of birth: Bristol, England
- Position: Midfielder

Youth career
- Avon Athletic
- 1989–1992: Nottingham Forest

Senior career*
Years	Team	Apps	(Gls)
1992–1994	Nottingham Forest	1	(0)
1993–1994	→ Wigan Athletic (loan)	8	(3)
1994–2002	Wigan Athletic	213	(29)
2002–2004	Scunthorpe United	46	(3)
2004–2005	Barrow	5	(1)
2005–2013	Kendal Town	?	(?)
2013	Northwich Victoria	?	(?)
2013–2014	Nelson	3	(0)
- * Club domestic league appearances and goals as of 18:23, 1 March 2014 (UTC)

Ian Antony Kilford (born 6 October 1973 in Bristol) is an English former professional footballer who played 262 games as a midfielder in the Football League for Nottingham Forest, Wigan Athletic and Scunthorpe United. He later played in non-league football for Barrow, Kendal Town, Northwich Victoria and Nelson.

== Playing career ==
Born in Bristol, Kilford played junior football for Avon Athletic before signing a YTS contract with Nottingham Forest at the age of 16. He made his professional debut in September 1993, appearing as a substitute in a 3–4 defeat against Bolton Wanderers, which would be his only appearance for Forest. Kilford had two loan spells with Wigan Athletic during the 1993–94 season before joining the club on a permanent deal in July 1994.

Kilford was part of the team that finished as champions of the Third Division in 1996–97, and played for the club at Wembley in the 2000 Football League Second Division play-off final defeat against Gillingham. He was released at the end of the 2001–02 season, having made over 250 appearances in nine seasons at the club.

Kilford signed a short-term deal with Bury in August 2002, but left the club without making a first team appearance. In November 2002, he joined Scunthorpe United on a non-contract basis. He was released by Scunthorpe in 2004.

He then had a few months with Barrow in the Conference North before moving to Kendal Town of the Northern Premier League, where he was player/assistant manager, before moving onto Northwich Victoria with Lee Ashcroft in January 2013. In December 2013, Kilford joined North West Counties Division One side Nelson on a free transfer. He made a total of three league appearances for the Admirals scoring no goals.

== Honours ==
Wigan Athletic

- Football League Third Division: 1996–97
