= Isidro Díaz (footballer, born 1972) =

Spanish footballer

Personal information
- Full name: Isidro Díaz Bernabé
- Date of birth: 15 May 1972 (age 54)
- Place of birth: Valencia, Spain
- Height: 1.69 m (5 ft 6 1/2 in)
- Position: Midfielder

Youth career
- Torrent

Senior career*
Years	Team	Apps	(Gls)
1991–1992	Teruel	32	(14)
1992–1994	Zaragoza B	62	(17)
1994–1995	Balaguer		
1995–1997	Wigan Athletic	73	(16)
1997	Wolverhampton Wanderers	1	(0)
1997–1998	Wigan Athletic	3	(0)
1998–1999	Rochdale	14	(2)
1999	Cartagonova	15	(0)
1999–2000	Leça	29	(1)
2000–2006	Chaves	155	(22)
2006–2008	Barakaldo	47	(5)
2009–2010	Laredo		
2011–2012	Castro	?	(1)
Total		431+	(78+)
- * Club domestic league appearances and goals

Isidro Díaz Bernabé (born 15 May 1972) is a Spanish former professional footballer who played as a right midfielder.

== Club career ==
Born in Valencia, Díaz spent his first years as a senior in the Tercera División, with the exception of the 1992–93 season, which ended in relegation from Segunda División B with Real Zaragoza's reserves. In the summer of 1995, he was part of a group of players dubbed "The Three Amigos" – which also included his compatriots Roberto Martínez and Jesús Seba – who were brought to Wigan Athletic by club chairman Dave Whelan; he helped the team win the Third Division title two years later, with the player contributing six goals in 35 matches.

Unable to agree a new deal, Díaz left the club by mutual consent in July 1997 and signed for Wolverhampton Wanderers. He played one game for the latter, a 3–0 away defeat against Oxford United, before returning to Springfield Park later that year; his second spell with Wigan was not as successful, appearing just three times in the league before moving to Rochdale at the end of the season. Midway through 1998–99, he returned to his home country and joined Cartagonova.

Díaz spent the following seven years in Portugal and its Segunda Liga, appearing and scoring regularly for both Leça (one season) and Chaves (six, where former Zaragoza and Wigan teammate Seba had already played). Aged 34, he returned to Spain and spent two years with Barakaldo in the third tier, after which he joined their coaching staff only to return to active shortly after for a brief spell with the reserve side.

Díaz retired from football at the age of 40, after playing one and a half seasons with Laredo in division four and one with Castro in the same league.

== Honours ==
Wigan Athletic

- Football League Third Division: 1996–97
