= Scott Willis (footballer) =

English footballer

Personal information
- Full name: Scott Leon Willis
- Date of birth: 20 February 1982 (age 44)
- Place of birth: Liverpool, England
- Height: 5 ft 9 in (1.75 m)
- Position: Midfielder

Senior career*
| Years | Team | Apps | (Gls) |
| 1999–2000 | Wigan Athletic | 0 | (0) |
| 2000–2001 | Mansfield Town | 0 | (0) |
| 2001 | → Doncaster Rovers (loan) | 0 | (0) |
| 2001 | Carlisle United | 1 | (0) |
| 2001–2002 | Bamber Bridge | 5 | (0) |
| 2002 | Droylsden | 14 | (3) |
| 2002–2004 | Lincoln City | 33 | (3) |
| 2003 | → Stockport County (loan) | 0 | (0) |
| 2004 | → Northwich Victoria (loan) | 4 | (0) |
| 2004 | → Hereford United (loan) | 8 | (2) |
| 2004 | Halifax Town | 2 | (0) |
| 2004 | Droylsden | 1 | (0) |
| 2005 | Runcorn FC Halton | 6 | (0) |
| 2005 | Stalybridge Celtic | 7 | (0) |
| 2005 | → Vauxhall Motors (loan) | 10 | (2) |
| 2005 | Workington | 2 | (0) |
| 2005–2006 | Leigh RMI | 31 | (9) |
| 2006–2007 | A.F.C. Telford United | 24 | (1) |
| 2007–2008 | Leigh RMI | | |
| 2008 | Witton Albion | | |
- * Club domestic league appearances and goals

Scott Leon Willis (born 20 February 1982) is an English footballer who played in the Football League for Carlisle United and Lincoln City, where he was part of the team that reached the Division Three play-off final in the 2002–03 season.

Willis signed for Witton Albion in June 2008.
