= Graeme Jones =

English footballer (born 1970)

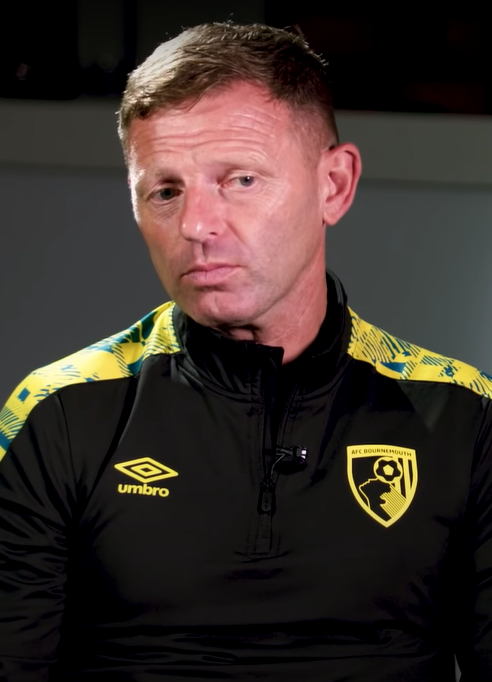
- Jones at AFC Bournemouth in 2020

Personal information
- Full name: Graeme Anthony Jones
- Date of birth: 13 March 1970 (age 56)
- Place of birth: Gateshead, England
- Position: Forward

Senior career*
Years	Team	Apps	(Gls)
1991–1992	North Shields	?	
1992–1993	Bridlington Town	67	(21)
1993–1996	Doncaster Rovers	92	(26)
1996–1999	Wigan Athletic	96	(44)
1999–2002	St Johnstone	41	(7)
2002–2003	Southend United	21	(2)
2003–2004	Boston United	36	(7)
2004–2005	Bury	3	(1)
2005	Clyde	13	(2)
2005–2006	Hamilton Academical	13	(3)
Total		315	(113)

Managerial career
- 2019–2020: Luton Town
- 2021: Newcastle United (caretaker)
- * Club domestic league appearances and goals

Graeme Anthony Jones (born 13 March 1970) is an English professional football manager and former player

His playing career, which spanned fifteen years, included spells as a forward at North Shields, Bridlington Town, Doncaster Rovers, Wigan Athletic, St Johnstone, Southend United, Boston United, Bury, Clyde and Hamilton Academical.

He went into coaching in 2007, when he became the assistant manager of Swansea City. Jones is notable as being the assistant to Roberto Martínez between 2007 and 2018, with spells at Swansea, Wigan Athletic, Everton and the Belgium national team. After leaving Belgium in 2018, he worked as assistant manager to Darren Moore at West Bromwich Albion, a role he held until March 2019. Jones was appointed to his first managerial position at newly promoted Championship club Luton Town in May 2019. He left the position in April 2020, going on to serve in assistant coaching roles at Bournemouth and Newcastle United.

== Playing career ==
Born in Gateshead, Jones, a lifelong Newcastle United fan began his career in 1991 with North Shields, moving to Bridlington Town in 1992, before earning a £10,000 move to Doncaster Rovers. He then joined Wigan Athletic in 1996, after scoring 30 goals in three years at Doncaster. He became an instant success with the Latics, scoring 31 league goals in his first season, which remains a Wigan record to this day. He also got a total of four hat-tricks this season. Jones went on to score 18 goals in the next two seasons, before joining Scottish side St Johnstone, on a £100,000 deal. Whilst at Wigan, he also helped them win the 1998–99 Football League Trophy, for the final of which he was an unused substitute.

Jones scored on his debut for St Johnstone, but his time with Saints was disrupted by injury. He returned to England in 2002 to sign for Southend United. He joined Boston United in 2003, before signing for Bury in 2004, where he scored on his debut against Yeovil Town. He also had injury problems at Bury, and after only three appearances in six months, he returned to Scotland to join Clyde. After scoring the winning goal on his debut, he found the net on one more occasion for the Bully Wee, before he joined Hamilton Academical in July 2006. Jones was forced to retire in March 2006 due to injury, and became assistant manager at Accies.

== Coaching career ==
In March 2007, Jones joined the coaching staff of then-League One side Swansea City, becoming the new assistant manager of recently appointed head coach Roberto Martínez. He followed Martínez to Wigan Athletic in June 2009, where he spent a period of four seasons working alongside Martínez, during which time Wigan Athletic won the 2013 FA Cup.

2012 saw Jones linked to the vacant managerial position at former side Swansea City after the departure of Brendan Rodgers, who left to take charge of Liverpool. However, talks between Jones and the club broke down, with Michael Laudrup subsequently taking over at the Liberty Stadium. Championship club Burnley later expressed their interest in appointing Jones as their new manager as successor to Eddie Howe, in which Martínez admitted he was "not worried" with the recent speculation; no move was materialised and the job went to Sean Dyche.

In July 2013, Jones relocated once again to Everton, continuing as assistant manager to Martínez, after Wigan were relegated from the Premier League. He left upon Martínez's sacking in May 2016, before being announced as Martínez's assistant coach of the Belgium national team in August, working alongside former Arsenal player Thierry Henry.

After huge speculation regarding Jones' future as Belgium coach, having been linked with various managerial positions within previous months, on 1 August 2018, it was announced that Jones would join newly relegated Championship club West Bromwich Albion as assistant coach to recently appointed head coach Darren Moore, which resulted in him leaving his position with Belgium, after a two-year spell, with this move meaning that this was the first time that Jones had not coached alongside Martínez for the first time since the beginning of his coaching career in 2007. On 10 March 2019, he was relieved from his duties with immediate effect, shortly following the dismissal of Moore, after a negative run of results.

On 2 May 2019, it was confirmed that Jones had agreed to become the new permanent manager of newly promoted Championship club Luton Town, signing onto a three-year contract, taking effect from 7 May. Jones replaced caretaker manager Mick Harford, who had been in charge of the club from January whilst they were in League One, going on to finish as divisional champions, after their previous manager Nathan Jones left to take charge of Stoke City in the Championship. During the off-season, Jones brought in six new additions to his squad, including Martin Cranie, Callum McManaman, Ryan Tunnicliffe, Brendan Galloway, Simon Sluga and Jacob Butterfield. His first game as a manager came on 2 August, a 3–3 thriller against Middlesbrough. However, by the end of 2019, Luton were sat 23rd in the Championship, sitting in the relegation zone. On 24 April 2020, with football suspended due to the COVID-19 pandemic and having achieved only 10 league wins all season, leaving the club lying in 23rd and in the relegation zone, Jones left his post by mutual consent.

In August 2020, Jones returned to assistant coaching, when he was appointed as a first-team coach at AFC Bournemouth under newly appointed manager Jason Tindall. He left in January 2021 in order to take up the same role at Premier League side Newcastle United as part of Steve Bruce's backroom staff. On 25 May 2021, it was confirmed that Jones would join Gareth Southgate's England coaching staff for the duration of UEFA Euro 2020.

Newcastle were taken over by a new Saudi-led consortium in October 2021, and on 20 October Bruce left his position by mutual consent. Jones was subsequently appointed as interim head coach for the following match against Crystal Palace and remained in charge for the next two fixtures against Chelsea and Brighton. Eddie Howe was subsequently appointed as the club's new permanent head coach, with Jones returning to his previous role as a first-team coach.

== Personal life ==
Jones' wife, Debbie, is from Stockton-on-Tees; she and her family support local football team Middlesbrough.

== Managerial statistics ==
As of match played 6 November 2021

Managerial record by team and tenure
Team	From	To	Record				
Team	From	To	P	W	D	L	Win %
Luton Town	7 May 2019	24 April 2020	41	12	5	24	29.3
Newcastle United (interim)	20 October 2021	8 November 2021	3	0	2	1	0.0
Total			44	12	7	25	27.3

== Honours ==
Wigan Athletic

- Football League Third Division: 1996–97

Individual

- PFA Team of the Year: 1996–97 Third Division
