= Roberto Martínez =

Spanish football manager (born 1973)

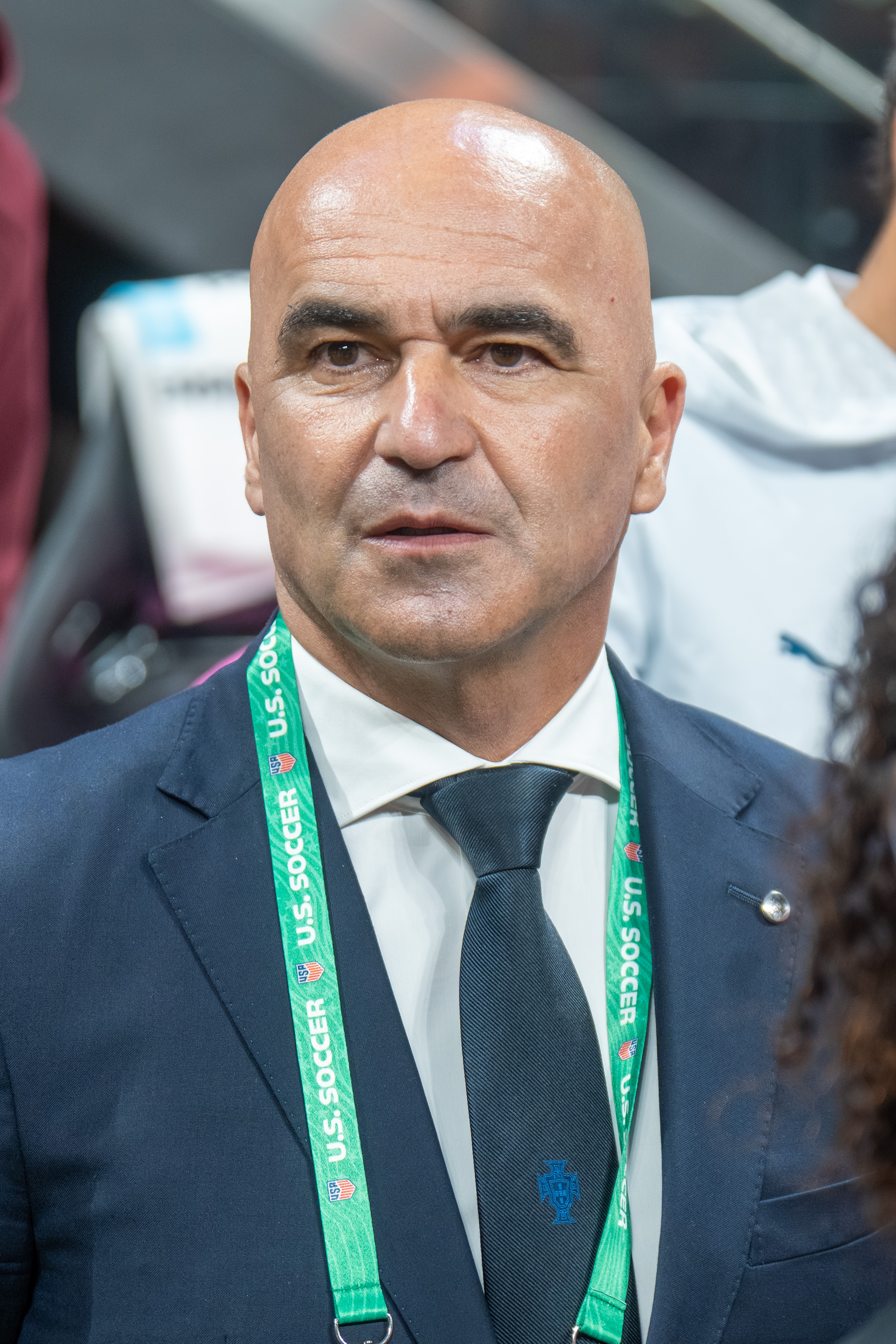
- Martínez as Portugal coach in 2026

Personal information
- Full name: Roberto Martínez Montoliu
- Date of birth: 13 July 1973 (age 53)
- Place of birth: Balaguer, Spain
- Height: 1.78 m (5 ft 10 in)
- Position: Defensive midfielder

Youth career
- 1981–1990: Balaguer
- 1990–1992: Zaragoza

Senior career*
Years	Team	Apps	(Gls)
1991–1994	Zaragoza B	55	(36)
1993	Zaragoza	1	(0)
1994–1995	Balaguer	32	(18)
1995–2001	Wigan Athletic	187	(17)
2001–2002	Motherwell	16	(0)
2002–2003	Walsall	6	(0)
2003–2006	Swansea City	122	(4)
2006–2007	Chester City	31	(3)
Total		450	(78)

Managerial career
- 2007–2009: Swansea City
- 2009–2013: Wigan Athletic
- 2013–2016: Everton
- 2016–2022: Belgium
- 2023–2026: Portugal
Medal record
Men's football
Representing Belgium (as manager)
FIFA World Cup
Third place	2018 Russia	Team
Representing Portugal (as manager)
UEFA Nations League
Winner	2025 Germany
- * Club domestic league appearances and goals

Roberto Martínez Montoliu (born 13 July 1973) is a Spanish professional football manager and former player. He was most recently the manager of the Portugal national team.

As a footballer, Martínez played as a defensive midfielder and began his senior career with Real Zaragoza in 1993, where he won the Copa del Rey in his debut season, before signing with his hometown club Balaguer in 1994. One year later, Martínez joined Wigan Athletic, where he won the Third Division in 1997 and the Football League Trophy in 1999, and formed part of the Three Amigos, a Spanish first-team trio of players alongside Jesús Seba and Isidro Díaz. Martínez then briefly played for Motherwell and Walsall before signing with Swansea City in 2003, where he won the Football League Trophy in 2006. He retired after playing one season with Chester City in 2007, aged 34.

Martínez began his managerial career at Swansea City in 2007 and won League One in 2008. He departed in 2009 to coach Wigan Athletic, winning their first ever FA Cup in 2013. He joined Everton that year but was fired in 2016. He joined Belgium soon after and led them to third place at the 2018 FIFA World Cup, their best-ever World Cup finish, and reached first in FIFA World Rankings between 2018 and 2022, but he resigned after failing to progress from the group stage at the 2022 FIFA World Cup. He became Portugal head coach in 2023 and won the UEFA Nations League in 2025, but resigned after being eliminated in the 2026 FIFA World Cup.

== Early life ==
Born in Balaguer, Lleida, Spain, Martínez began his career at his home-town club Balaguer in the Tercera División, playing his first competitive game for the club's youth team when he was nine years old. He played at every level of youth football for the club, before moving to Real Zaragoza at the age of 16.

== Playing career ==
Martínez made his first appearance for the Real Zaragoza B team in 1991, but spent most of his first three seasons at the club playing for the youth teams. On 20 June 1993, he made his debut for the first team in La Liga on the final day of the 1992–93 season in a 2–2 draw with Atlético Madrid, coming onto the pitch as a substitute for Luis Cuartero in the 55th minute. During the following season, Martínez featured more regularly for the B team, helping the team regain promotion to the Segunda División B after being relegated in the previous season. In 1994, he returned to Balaguer to play for the first team, and also ran a football school for the club as an alternative to military service.

Martínez was offered the chance to move to England by Dave Whelan, Chairman of Wigan Athletic, and he signed on a free transfer on 25 July 1995, joining fellow Spaniards Jesús Seba and Isidro Díaz, who were collectively referred to as the "Three Amigos". He made his debut on 12 August 1995 against Gillingham, scoring for Wigan in a 2–1 defeat. He finished the 1995–96 season as the club's top goalscorer with 13 goals in all competitions, and his impressive performances were recognised when he was named in the Division Three PFA Team of the Year, and was also voted by the supporters as the club's Player of the Year.

Martínez won his first honours at the end of the following season, in 1996–97, when Wigan finished as Division Three Champions. He was once again named in the Division Three PFA Team of the Year, and was rewarded with a new four-year contract. Martínez was also at Wigan when the team won the Football League Trophy in 1999, for which he received a winners' medal despite being injured when the final was played.

Released by Wigan on a free transfer at the end of the 2000–01 season, Martínez signed a three-year deal with Scottish club Motherwell in July 2001. He made only eight appearances, plus eight more as a substitute, before having his contract terminated at the end of the season, after the club had entered administration a week earlier.

He moved back to England to join First Division club Walsall on a free transfer in August 2002. Again, he did not feature regularly, starting just one game for Walsall (a home match against Reading, in which he also got sent off) and making a further five appearances as a substitute. In January 2003, Martínez joined Swansea City on a short-term contract until the end of the season, becoming the captain and helping to preserve the club's Football League status on the last day of the season. In June 2003, despite reported interest from First Division clubs, Martínez signed a new contract with Swansea. At the start of the 2004–05 season, Martínez was dropped from the squad by manager Kenny Jackett, but fought his way back into the first team, making 37 league appearances as the club won promotion to League One.

In May 2006, Martínez was released by Swansea on a free transfer. Martínez joined Chester City on a free transfer, signing a two-year contract. On 24 February 2007, he returned to Swansea City as manager on a two-year contract, replacing Kenny Jackett, who had let him go at the end of the previous season. This appointment was mostly met positively from the fans, despite him not having any managerial experience. Because his move to Swansea occurred outside the transfer window, Martínez could not register himself to play for the club for the remainder of the season. Although Martínez initially wanted to continue playing football for as long as possible, he soon felt that he would be unable to fully commit to a player-manager role, bringing his playing career to an end at the age of 33.

== Managerial career ==
=== Swansea City ===
With Martínez in charge, Swansea lost just once in eleven games, giving them a chance of clinching a play-off place on the final day of the 2006–07 season, but missed out following a 6–3 defeat at home against Blackpool. Martínez won his first League One Manager of the Month Award for October 2007 by leading his team to four straight wins in four in the league, including a 5–0 win and a 4–1 win over Leyton Orient and Bournemouth, respectively, away from home. He went on to win the Award consecutively, in December after a thrilling 3–2 win over Leeds United at the Swans' Liberty Stadium, and in January after a second 4–0 win away from home against Doncaster Rovers. He was also nominated for the February prize but lost out to John Ward, manager of Carlisle United. In April 2008, Martínez signed a new contract with Swansea as the club became League One Champions, securing promotion to the Championship, and in May 2008, he was awarded the League One Manager of the Year Award for leading Swansea to the title.

The 2008–09 season saw Martínez preside over Swansea's first game in England's second-tier division in 24 years, which began poorly with a 2–0 defeat away at Charlton Athletic. Subsequently, Swansea's form improved and they lost only four games out of the next 30, including a number of key league victories against opponents such as Reading and Wolverhampton Wanderers. Martínez also guided his team to a 2–0 FA Cup win against Premier League side Portsmouth, who were the defending cup holders.

Throughout his time at Swansea, Martínez was often linked with other managerial jobs, but he often stated that he would only leave Swansea as manager if he was "forced out." As his success grew, he publicly criticised players that left the club for money or for larger clubs. In June 2009, both Celtic and Wigan Athletic asked Swansea for permission to speak with Martínez regarding their managerial vacancies, with Wigan being granted the opportunity to hold talks with Martínez. After several days of negotiations, Martínez was confirmed as the new manager of Wigan on 15 June 2009, taking four backroom staff with him. Martínez signed a three-year contract worth £1.5 million and was assured by Wigan chairman Dave Whelan that his job would be safe for the next three years, even if the club suffered relegation.

=== Wigan Athletic ===
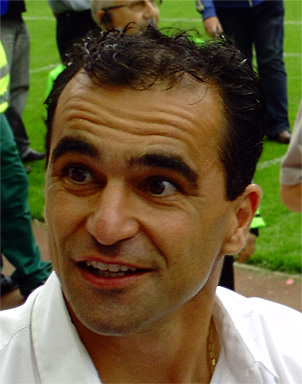
Martínez as manager of Wigan Athletic in 2009

Martínez's move to Wigan was not without controversy. Many Swansea fans were upset that he had chosen to leave the club despite his previous comments that he would have to be "forced out" to leave the club, and he was subsequently nicknamed "El Judas" by some fans. Martínez explained that his decision had been a difficult one to make, but felt the opportunity to manage in the Premier League at the club where he began his English footballing career was too good to turn down. His first league game as Wigan manager was an away fixture against Aston Villa on 15 August 2009. Wigan won the match 2–0, and was the first season they had won an opening game in the Premier League.

In his first home game at the DW Stadium, however, the team slumped to a 1–0 defeat to newly promoted Wolverhampton Wanderers, and this was followed by a 5–0 defeat against Manchester United, despite being 0–0 at half time. This inconsistency set the tone for Martínez's first season in charge, with home wins against Chelsea, Liverpool and Arsenal, but also a series of heavy defeats. This included a 9–1 defeat away to Tottenham Hotspur on 22 November 2009, a club record defeat for Wigan, and the first time that a Premier League side had scored nine goals in a single match since Manchester United beat Ipswich Town 9–0 in 1995.

On 26 October 2010, Martínez faced his former club Swansea in the League Cup. Martínez received a hostile reception from Swansea fans as Wigan won the match 2–0. On 10 June 2011, it was announced that Martínez had turned down an approach from Aston Villa regarding their vacant managerial position.

After a good start to the 2011–12 campaign, Wigan suffered eight straight defeats to leave them at the bottom of the league. Between August and February, Wigan won a mere four games, leading to predictions that relegation to the Championship would be inevitable for Wigan. As the end of the season approached, however, Wigan's form improved dramatically as they recorded wins against Liverpool, Arsenal, Manchester United, and Newcastle United, among others. This remarkable late rally, which involved seven wins in nine games, led to Wigan finishing 15th in the league – seven points clear of relegation – and also saw Martínez awarded his first Premier League Manager of the Month Award for April 2012.

On 17 May 2012, Wigan chairman Dave Whelan confirmed that Liverpool had been given permission to discuss their managerial vacancy with Martínez. However, the job eventually went to Swansea manager Brendan Rodgers. Martínez said that he wished to remain at Wigan in order to create "a legacy" at the club.

On 26 September 2012, Martínez was charged by the FA for comments made after Wigan's 4–0 loss to Manchester United on 15 September 2012. He accused match officials of favouring United at Old Trafford and said that Danny Welbeck should have been sent off.

During the 2012–13 season, Martínez led Wigan through their most successful ever FA Cup campaign as they won it for the first time in the club's history. Wigan's previous best result in the competition had been to reach the quarter-finals; Martínez led Wigan to their first Wembley semi-final after a 3–0 away win against Everton in the quarter-final. Wigan faced Millwall in the semi-final on 13 April 2013, and went on to reach their first ever FA Cup Final with a 2–0 win. They played Manchester City on 11 May, and won 1–0 with a goal in the 91st minute from substitute Ben Watson to become the 43rd different club to win the FA Cup.

Just three days after lifting the FA Cup at Wembley, though, on 14 May 2013, Martínez's Wigan side were relegated from the Premier League after a 4–1 defeat against Arsenal, having been in the Premier League since promotion in 2005.

=== Everton ===
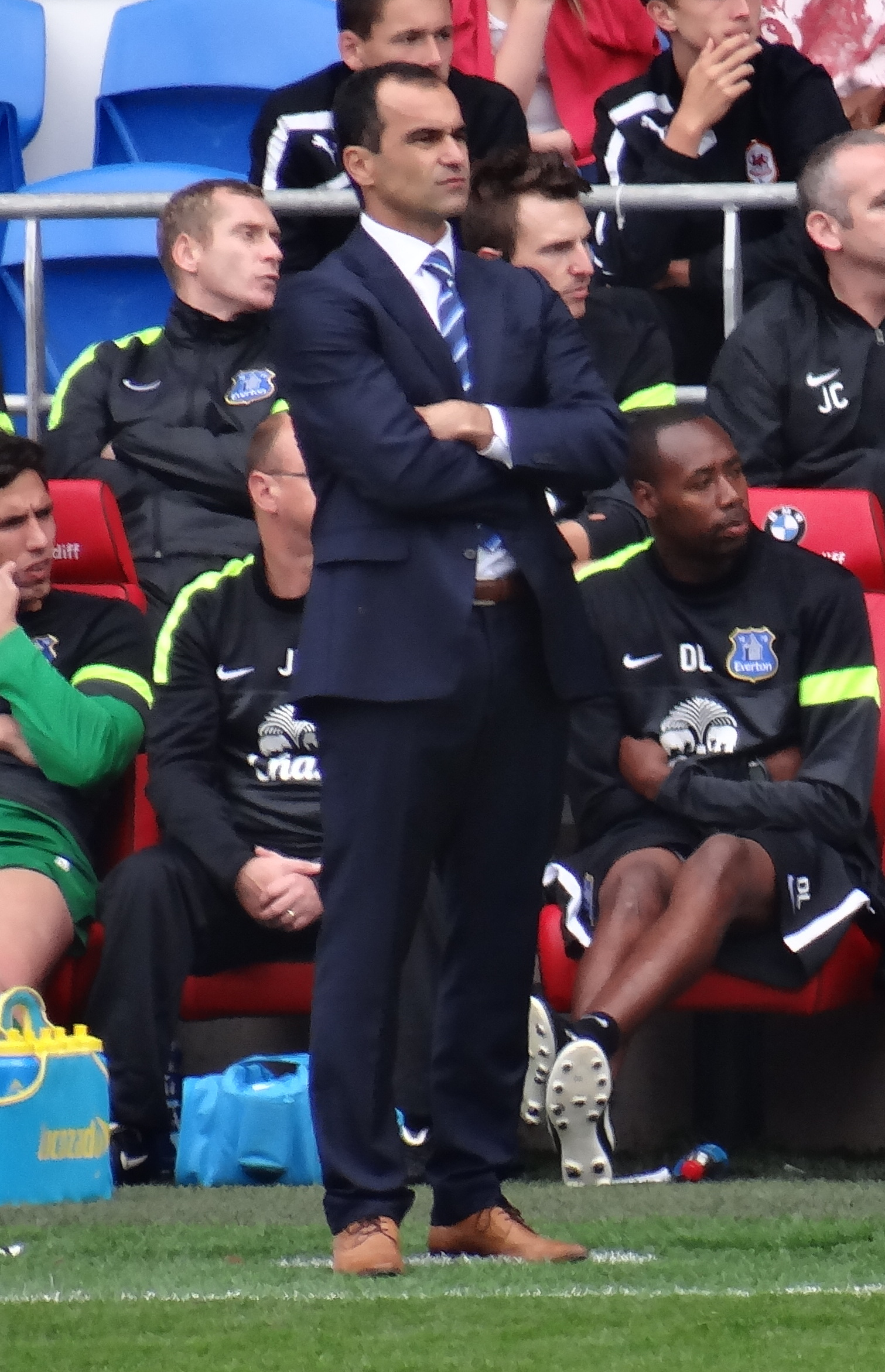
Martínez as manager of Everton in 2013

On 28 May 2013, Wigan chairman Dave Whelan announced that Martínez received permission to speak to Everton about their vacant managerial position. Whelan said that "He (Martínez) feels he's not the man to lead us back into the Premier League". Whelan said Everton chairman Bill Kenwright contacted him a week earlier for permission to speak to Martínez if talks broke down. Whelan said he gave permission "immediately", adding that he expected Everton to pay compensation of around £2 million.

On 5 June 2013, Everton confirmed the appointment of Martínez as the club's 14th manager after agreeing to a four-year contract. Everton also agreed to send a compensation package of around £1.5 million to Wigan. Kenwright had interviewed three candidates within his club, and Martínez was the only candidate who was approached while contracted to another club. Martínez brought four members of his Wigan backroom staff to Everton, following the departures of various members of David Moyes' previous backroom staff, who followed him to Manchester United the same week. Graeme Jones was appointed as assistant manager, Iñaki Bergara became goalkeeping coach, Richard Evans was appointed as Head of Performance and former England international footballer Kevin Reeves was appointed as head scout. Martínez promised to qualify Everton for the UEFA Champions League.

His first Premier League game in charge of Everton was a 2–2 draw away to Norwich City on 17 August. Martínez's first league win as Everton manager came against Chelsea on 14 September. When Everton beat West Ham United 3–2 in their next game, it meant that Martínez became the first ever manager of the club to avoid defeat in his first six games. However, the run did not last, as in the next fixture Fulham won 2–1 in the third round of the League Cup.

On 12 April 2014, Martínez led Everton to a 1–0 win away at Sunderland to move Everton up to fourth place in the Premier League and register a club record seventh straight Premier League win, which also gave them a club record Premier League points tally with five games remaining. Eight days later, Everton won 2–0 at Goodison Park to make Martínez the first Everton manager since Harry Catterick in the 1969–70 season to record a league double over Manchester United. He eventually led the team to a fifth place finish in the league in his first season at the club. Martínez signed a new five-year contract after the season ended.

Despite finishing fifth the previous season, Everton's 2014–15 campaign was less successful. By March 2015, they had won just one of their last ten matches. A 2–0 defeat to Arsenal resulted in the Blues dropping to 14th, six points above the relegation zone. In the Europa League, Everton advanced to the round of 16, winning 7–2 on aggregate against Young Boys. Martínez's side were however knocked out after a 5–2 loss to Ukrainian side Dynamo Kyiv.

On 12 May 2016, Martínez was sacked by the club, who were 12th with one game remaining. He had guided them to the semi-finals of both domestic cups that season, but fans had protested against his management and demanded his removal.

=== Belgium ===
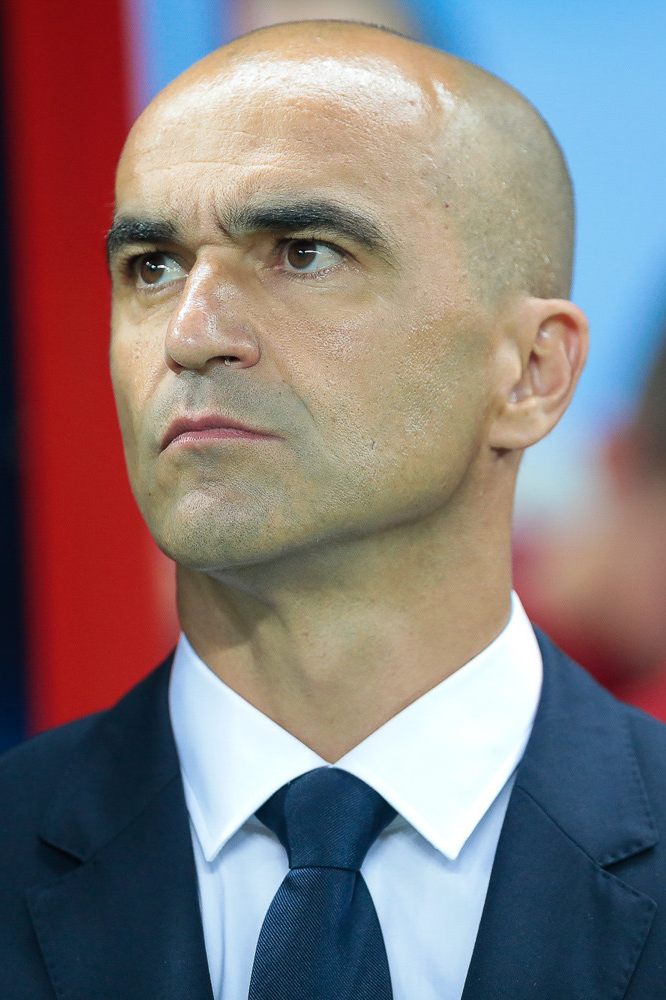
Martínez as Belgium coach at the 2018 FIFA World Cup

On 3 August 2016, Martínez signed as coach of the Belgium national team, succeeding Marc Wilmots. In his first match in charge on 1 September 2016, Belgium were defeated 2–0 by his birth country Spain in Brussels. Martinez's Belgians were the first European side to advance from qualifying into the 2018 FIFA World Cup after their 2–1 win over Greece. During the group stage, his team won all group games and in the round of 16, came from two goals down to beat Japan 3–2. In the quarter-finals, Belgium defeated Brazil 2–1 to set up a semi-final against neighbours France, which they subsequently lost 1–0. Belgium defeated England 2–0 in the third-place play-off to secure their best World Cup finish of all time. Under Martínez, Belgium rose to first in the FIFA World Rankings in September 2018 and remained there in February 2021, without winning a single title in many years. After winning the group at Euro 2020, he became the only manager to do so at the 2018 World Cup and at that tournament. In addition, he set the record for most Belgium wins in one spell as manager (46 from 49, compared to 45 in 114 for Guy Thys; Thys won four more in a second spell). However, he was unable to guide Belgium to the title at Euro 2020, as the team suffered a blowing 1–2 defeat to Italy in the quarter-finals and was eliminated. Despite this performance in the tournament, he remained the coach of Belgium until the end of the 2022 FIFA World Cup. He became the coach with the most victories in the history of the Belgian national team after beating Belarus in the qualifying phase for the 2022 World Cup. On 20 September 2021, he again achieved a new feat: Belgium celebrated three years in a row as leader of the FIFA ranking.

Belgium entered the 2022 FIFA World Cup as second in the FIFA ranking. Despite this, Belgium were eliminated in the group stage following a 0–2 loss to Morocco and a goalless draw with Croatia, despite having beaten Canada 1–0 in the first matchday. Martinez resigned after the match against Croatia, additionally revealing that he was planning on stepping down as Belgium's manager after the tournament, regardless of their World Cup performances.

=== Portugal ===
On 9 January 2023, Martinez was announced as the new head coach of Portugal, replacing Fernando Santos. His first game in charge took place on 23 March in a 4–0 home win over Liechtenstein at Estádio José Alvalade in the UEFA Euro 2024 qualifiers. On 11 September, Martinez led Portugal to their biggest victory in international history by defeating Luxembourg 9–0 at home. Martinez's Portuguese side were one of the first European sides to advance from qualifying into the UEFA Euro 2024 after their 3–2 win over Slovakia, making it their quickest qualification to a major tournament in their history.

On 16 October, Portugal secured first place in their group, following a 5–0 away victory over Bosnia and Herzegovina. Following a 2–0 home over Iceland, Martinez led Portugal to a perfect qualification campaign, overtaking the record for most scored and least scored against in a qualifying campaign in the country's history, with a record of 36 goals scored and only two goals conceded, keeping nine clean sheets in the process. Portugal also became one of the few European national teams to win all of their matches for the qualifiers of the UEFA European Championship, with ten wins from ten matches, the first time in Portugal's international history.

In their European Championship group, Portugal were paired with Georgia, Turkey and Czechia. With wins against Czechia and Turkey and a loss to Georgia, Portugal qualified for the round of 16 as group winners, where they played against Slovenia. The game finished 0–0 and was decided on penalties, with Portuguese goalkeeper Diogo Costa saving each of Slovenia's penalties, while Portugal scored all of theirs. Facing France in the quarter-finals, the game again finished 0–0 and was decided on penalties; a miss by João Felix meant France won 5–3, and Portugal were eliminated. On 9 June 2025, Martínez helped Portugal to their second UEFA Nations League title after defeating the reigning European champions Spain 5–3 on penalties.

On 6 July 2026, following a 1–0 defeat to Spain in the round of 16 of the 2026 FIFA World Cup, Martínez announced his resignation with immediate effect. The team was heavily criticized for their performance, including former Euro 2016 winner Ricardo Quaresma, who harshly criticized Portugal's exit, questioning the narrative of Portugal's best generation in national history, their passive playing style, and expressed deep frustration with the team's overall lack of ambition.

== Style of management ==
Martínez is often credited with establishing Swansea City's possession-based style of play during their title-winning League One campaign and subsequent rise to the Premier League. Following his departure to Wigan, succeeding Swansea managers were chosen to suit the style of football Martínez had developed, such as Brendan Rodgers, Michael Laudrup, Francesco Guidolin, and Graham Potter. Martínez also implemented a similar possession-based style of play at Wigan and Everton to varying degrees of success. Martínez cites the philosophy of Johan Cruyff as an influence upon his managerial approach.

A number of younger coaches, including Graham Potter and Chris Davies, have studied Martinez's training methods and principles for possession-based football.

== Broadcasting career ==
Martínez served as a studio analyst for ESPN's coverage of the FIFA World Cup (2010 and 2014 editions), the UEFA European Championship (2012 and 2016 editions), and the 2013 FIFA Confederations Cup. He has also been a regular guest on Sky Sports' Spanish football programme Revista de la Liga. In addition, he has made several appearances on the BBC's Match of the Day. In July 2020, Martinez was unveiled as one of the pundits for CBS Sports Network's UEFA Champions League coverage.

== Personal life ==
In June 2009, Martínez married his Scottish girlfriend Beth Thomson at St Joseph's Cathedral in Swansea. The couple met in Scotland in 2002, while he was playing for Motherwell. They have two daughters together.

While playing for Real Zaragoza, Martínez obtained a bachelor's degree in physiotherapy. He also has a postgraduate diploma in business management, which he obtained from Manchester Metropolitan University.

== Managerial statistics ==
As of 6 July 2026

Managerial record by team and tenure
Team	Nat.	From	To	Record					Ref.
Team	Nat.	From	To	G	W	D	L	Win %	Ref.
Swansea City	(Wales)	24 February 2007	15 June 2009	125	63	37	25	50.40	
Wigan Athletic	(England)	15 June 2009	5 June 2013	175	51	47	77	29.14	
Everton	(England)	5 June 2013	12 May 2016	143	61	39	43	42.66	
Belgium	(Belgium)	3 August 2016	1 December 2022	80	56	13	11	70.00	
Portugal	(Portugal)	9 January 2023	6 July 2026	45	30	9	6	66.67	
Career Total				568	261	145	162	45.95	

== Honours ==
=== Player ===
Real Zaragoza

- Copa del Rey: 1993–94

Wigan Athletic

- Football League Third Division: 1996–97
- Football League Trophy: 1998–99

Swansea City

- Football League Trophy: 2005–06

Individual

- PFA Team of the Year: 1995–96 Third Division, 1996–97 Third Division

=== Manager ===
Swansea City

- Football League One: 2007–08

Wigan Athletic

- FA Cup: 2012–13

Belgium

- FIFA World Cup third place: 2018

Portugal

- UEFA Nations League: 2024–25

Individual

- League One Manager of the Year: 2007–08
- Football League One Manager of the Month: October 2007, December 2007, January 2008
- Premier League Manager of the Month: April 2012
- LMA FA Cup Manager of the Year: 2012–13
- Belgian Sports Coach of the Year: 2018

== See also ==
- List of FA Cup winning managers
