= 1996–97 Football League =

98th season of the Football League

The Football League
- Season: 1996–97
- Champions: Bolton Wanderers
- Promoted: Bolton Wanderers; Barnsley; Crystal Palace
- Relegated: Hereford United

The 1996–97 Football League (known as the Nationwide Football League for sponsorship reasons) was the 98th completed season of The Football League.

Bolton Wanderers returned to the Premiership in superb fashion, hitting 100 goals and taking 98 points. Barnsley were promoted to the top flight for the first time in their history, while Crystal Palace returned after a two-year absence by winning the play-offs.

The decline of Oldham Athletic continued, falling into the third tier for the first time in 23 years, and just three years after being in the Premiership. Grimsby Town and Southend United joined them in relegation to the Second Division.

Bury won their second consecutive promotion, taking the Second Division title, Stockport County joined them in automatic promotion, and play-off winners Crewe Alexandra completed the trio moving up.

Going down were Peterborough United, Shrewsbury Town, Rotherham United and Notts County. County had been in the top division just five years earlier.

Wigan Athletic won the Third Division title on goals scored from Fulham. Carlisle United and play-off winners Northampton Town also won promotion to the Second Division.

Hereford United were the first club for four years to be relegated to the Conference after finishing bottom. Conference champions Macclesfield Town replaced Hereford (two years after Town had been denied entry to the Third Division). In December, Brighton & Hove Albion were 11 points adrift at the bottom of the Third Division, having had 2 points deducted for a pitch invasion. However a draw in their final game at Hereford kept Brighton in the league, and sent United down.

== Final league tables and results ==
The tables below are reproduced here in the exact form that they can be found at The Rec.Sport.Soccer Statistics Foundation website, with home and away statistics separated. Play-off results are from the same website.

== First Division ==
First Division
- Season: 1996–97
- Champions: Bolton Wanderers
- Promoted: Bolton Wanderers; Barnsley; Crystal Palace
- Relegated: Grimsby Town; Oldham Athletic; Southend United
- Matches: 552
- Goals: 1,474 (2.67 per match)
- Top goalscorer: John McGinlay (24 goals)

One season after being relegated from the Premier League, Bolton Wanderers finished champions of Division One after leading the table virtually all season, finishing with 100 goals and 98 points in their final season at Burnden Park before relocating to the new all-seater Reebok Stadium. Barnsley finished runners-up and reached the top flight for the first time in their 110-year history. Wolves, who were beaten to automatic promotion by Barnsley, lost to Crystal Palace in the semi-finals of the playoffs, their second playoff defeat in three seasons, while Sheffield United overcame Ipswich Town in the other semi-final. Palace sealed promotion after two years away from the Premier League when midfielder David Hopkin scored with almost the last kick of the game.

A year after almost being relegated to Division Two, Portsmouth made strong progress in their second full season under the management of Terry Fenwick and just missed out on the playoffs. Port Vale, who finished eighth, enjoyed one of the highest final positions in their history, although eighth place was not high enough for playoff qualification and the chance of top flight football for the first time in the club's history. Vale's local rivals Stoke City finished 12th in their final season at the 119-year-old Victoria Ground before moving to the new Britannia Stadium. Manchester City spent the first half of the season battling at the wrong end of the table before the mid-season appointment of Frank Clark sparked a turnaround in fortunes and lifted them to 14th in the final table.

Southend United's six-year spell in the league's second tier came to an end as they finished bottom of Division One, with relegation quickly being followed by the dismissal of manager Ronnie Whelan. Oldham Athletic were next to go, their second relegation in four seasons being confirmed soon after the departure of manager Graeme Sharp. Alan Buckley, sacked mid-season by West Bromwich Albion, returned to Grimsby Town for his second spell as manager but was unable to keep the Mariners up, the battle against relegation being lost on the final day of the season.

Pos	Team	Pld	W	D	L	GF	GA	GD	Pts	Qualification or relegation
1	Bolton Wanderers (C, P)	46	28	14	4	100	53	+47	98	Promotion to the Premier League
2	Barnsley (P)	46	22	14	10	76	55	+21	80	Promotion to the Premier League
3	Wolverhampton Wanderers	46	22	10	14	68	51	+17	76	Qualification for the First Division play-offs
4	Ipswich Town	46	20	14	12	68	50	+18	74	Qualification for the First Division play-offs
5	Sheffield United	46	20	13	13	75	52	+23	73	Qualification for the First Division play-offs
6	Crystal Palace (O, P)	46	19	14	13	78	48	+30	71	Qualification for the First Division play-offs
7	Portsmouth	46	20	8	18	59	53	+6	68	
8	Port Vale	46	17	16	13	58	55	+3	67	
9	Queens Park Rangers	46	18	12	16	64	60	+4	66	
10	Birmingham City	46	17	15	14	52	48	+4	66	
11	Tranmere Rovers	46	17	14	15	63	56	+7	65	
12	Stoke City	46	18	10	18	51	57	−6	64	
13	Norwich City	46	17	12	17	63	68	−5	63	
14	Manchester City	46	17	10	19	59	60	−1	61	
15	Charlton Athletic	46	16	11	19	52	66	−14	59	
16	West Bromwich Albion	46	14	15	17	68	72	−4	57	
17	Oxford United	46	16	9	21	64	68	−4	57	
18	Reading	46	15	12	19	58	67	−9	57	
19	Swindon Town	46	15	9	22	52	71	−19	54	
20	Huddersfield Town	46	13	15	18	48	61	−13	54	
21	Bradford City	46	12	12	22	47	72	−25	48	
22	Grimsby Town (R)	46	11	13	22	60	81	−21	46	Relegation to the Second Division
23	Oldham Athletic (R)	46	10	13	23	51	66	−15	43	Relegation to the Second Division
24	Southend United (R)	46	8	15	23	42	86	−44	39	Relegation to the Second Division

Rules for classification: 1) Points; 2) Goals scored; 3) Goal difference
(C) Champions; (O) Play-off winners; (P) Promoted; (R) Relegated

=== Play-offs ===
Semi-finals; 1st leg – 10 May; 2nd leg – 14 May 1997
3rd	Wolverhampton Wanderers	1	2	3
6th	Crystal Palace	3	1	4
4th	Ipswich Town	1	2	3
5th	Sheffield United (away goals)	1	2	3

Final at Wembley; 26 May 1997
6th	Crystal Palace	1
5th	Sheffield United	0

=== Top scorers ===
Rank	Player	Club	Goals
1	(Scotland) John McGinlay	Bolton Wanderers	24
2	(England) Steve Bull	Wolverhampton Wanderers	23
3	(England) Trevor Morley	Reading	22
4	(Wales) Nathan Blake	Bolton Wanderers	20
5	(Republic of Ireland) John Aldridge	Tranmere Rovers	18
=	(England) Nigel Jemson	Oxford United	18
=	(England) Mike Sheron	Stoke City	18

=== Results ===
Home \ Away	BAR	BIR	BOL	BRA	CHA	CRY	GRI	HUD	IPS	MCI	NWC	OLD	OXF	PTV	POR	QPR	REA	SHU	STD	STK	SWI	TRA	WBA	WOL
Barnsley		0–1	2–2	2–0	4–0	0–0	1–3	3–1	1–2	2–0	3–1	2–0	0–0	1–0	3–2	1–3	3–0	2–0	3–0	3–0	1–1	3–0	2–0	1–3
Birmingham City	0–0		3–1	3–0	0–0	1–0	0–0	1–0	1–0	2–0	2–3	0–0	2–0	1–2	0–3	0–0	4–1	1–1	2–1	3–1	1–0	0–0	2–3	1–2
Bolton Wanderers	2–2	2–1		2–1	4–1	2–2	6–1	2–0	1–2	1–0	3–1	3–1	4–0	4–2	2–0	2–1	2–1	2–2	3–1	1–1	7–0	1–0	1–0	3–0
Bradford City	2–2	0–2	2–4		1–0	0–4	3–4	1–1	2–1	1–3	0–2	0–3	2–0	1–0	3–1	3–0	0–0	1–2	0–0	1–0	2–1	1–0	1–1	2–1
Charlton Athletic	2–2	2–1	3–3	0–2		2–1	1–3	2–1	1–1	1–1	4–4	1–0	2–0	1–3	2–1	2–1	1–0	0–0	2–0	1–2	2–0	3–1	1–1	0–0
Crystal Palace	1–1	0–1	1–1	3–1	1–0		3–0	1–1	0–0	3–1	2–0	3–1	2–2	1–1	1–2	3–0	3–2	0–1	6–1	2–0	1–2	0–1	0–0	2–3
Grimsby Town	2–3	1–2	1–2	1–1	2–0	2–1		2–2	2–1	1–1	1–4	0–3	0–2	1–1	0–1	2–0	2–0	2–4	4–0	1–1	2–1	0–0	1–1	1–3
Huddersfield Town	0–0	3–0	1–2	3–3	2–0	1–1	2–0		2–0	1–1	2–0	3–2	1–0	0–1	1–3	1–2	1–0	2–1	0–0	2–1	0–0	0–1	0–0	0–2
Ipswich Town	1–1	1–1	0–1	3–2	2–1	3–1	1–1	1–3		1–0	2–0	4–0	2–1	2–1	1–1	2–0	5–2	3–1	1–1	1–1	3–2	0–2	5–0	0–0
Manchester City	1–2	1–0	1–2	3–2	2–1	1–1	3–1	0–0	1–0		2–1	1–0	2–3	0–1	1–1	0–3	3–2	0–0	3–0	2–0	3–0	1–2	3–2	0–1
Norwich City	1–1	0–1	0–1	2–0	1–2	1–1	2–1	2–0	3–1	0–0		2–0	1–1	1–1	1–0	1–1	1–1	1–1	0–0	2–0	2–0	1–1	2–4	1–0
Oldham Athletic	0–1	2–2	0–0	1–2	1–1	0–1	0–3	1–2	3–3	2–1	3–0		2–1	3–0	0–0	0–2	1–1	0–2	0–0	1–2	5–1	1–2	1–1	3–2
Oxford United	5–1	0–0	0–0	2–0	0–2	1–4	3–2	1–0	3–1	1–4	0–1	3–1		0–2	2–0	2–3	2–1	4–1	5–0	4–1	2–0	2–1	1–0	1–1
Port Vale	1–3	3–0	1–1	1–1	2–0	0–2	1–1	0–0	2–2	0–2	6–1	3–2	2–0		0–2	4–4	1–0	0–0	2–1	1–1	1–0	2–1	2–2	1–2
Portsmouth	4–2	1–1	0–3	3–1	2–0	2–2	1–0	3–1	0–1	2–1	0–1	1–0	2–1	1–1		1–2	1–0	1–1	1–0	1–0	0–1	1–3	4–0	0–2
Queens Park Rangers	3–1	1–1	1–2	1–0	1–2	0–1	3–0	2–0	0–1	2–2	3–2	0–1	2–1	1–2	2–1		0–2	1–0	4–0	1–1	1–1	2–0	0–2	2–2
Reading	1–2	0–0	3–2	0–0	2–2	1–6	1–1	4–1	1–0	2–0	2–1	2–0	2–0	0–1	0–0	2–1		1–0	3–2	2–2	2–0	2–0	2–2	2–1
Sheffield United	0–1	4–4	1–1	3–0	3–0	3–0	3–1	3–1	1–3	2–0	2–3	2–2	3–1	3–0	1–0	1–1	2–0		3–0	1–0	2–0	0–0	1–2	2–3
Southend United	1–2	1–1	5–2	1–1	0–2	2–1	1–0	1–2	0–0	2–3	1–1	1–1	2–2	0–0	2–1	0–1	2–1	3–2		2–1	1–3	1–1	2–3	1–1
Stoke City	1–0	1–0	1–2	1–0	1–0	2–2	3–1	3–2	0–1	2–1	1–2	2–1	2–1	2–0	3–1	0–0	1–1	0–4	1–2		2–0	2–0	2–1	1–0
Swindon Town	3–0	3–1	2–2	1–1	1–0	0–2	3–3	6–0	0–4	2–0	0–3	1–0	1–0	1–1	0–1	1–1	3–1	2–1	0–0	1–0		2–1	2–3	1–2
Tranmere Rovers	1–1	1–0	2–2	3–0	4–0	1–3	3–2	1–1	3–0	1–1	3–1	1–1	0–0	2–0	4–3	2–3	2–2	1–1	3–0	0–0	2–1		2–3	0–2
West Bromwich Albion	1–2	2–0	2–2	0–0	1–2	1–0	2–0	1–1	0–0	1–3	5–1	1–1	3–3	1–1	0–2	4–1	3–2	1–2	4–0	0–2	1–2	1–2		2–4
Wolverhampton Wanderers	3–3	1–2	1–2	1–0	1–0	0–3	1–1	0–0	0–0	3–0	3–2	0–1	3–1	0–1	0–1	1–1	0–1	1–2	4–1	2–0	1–0	3–2	2–0	

Legend: Blue = home team win; Yellow = draw; Red = away team win.

=== Locations ===
Locations of the First Division teams

=== Attendances ===
#	Club	Average
1	Manchester City	26,753
2	Wolverhampton Wanderers	24,763
3	Birmingham City	17,751
4	Sheffield United	16,638
5	Crystal Palace	16,085
6	Bolton Wanderers	15,826
7	West Bromwich Albion	15,064
8	Norwich City	14,719
9	Bradford City	12,925
10	Stoke City	12,698
11	Queens Park Rangers	12,554
12	Huddersfield Town	12,175
13	Ipswich Town	11,953
14	Barnsley	11,356
15	Charlton Athletic	11,081
16	Swindon Town	9,917
17	Reading	9,160
18	Portsmouth	8,857
19	Tranmere Rovers	8,127
20	Oxford United	7,608
21	Port Vale	7,385
22	Oldham Athletic	7,045
23	Grimsby Town	5,859
24	Southend United	5,072

== Second Division ==
Bury's upturn in fortunes continued as they followed their promotion from Division Three with promotion from Division Two, finishing champions of the division to clinch a place in Division One. Stockport County, another club more familiar with the lower two divisions of the league, sealed promotion as runners-up at the end of an exciting season which also saw them reach the semi-finals of the League Cup.

Crewe Alexandra finally reached the league's second tier for the first time over a century, triumphing over Brentford in the Division Two playoff final after falling at the semi-final stages during the previous two seasons. Bristol City and Luton Town were the beaten semi-finalists. Notts County finished bottom of the table to make it three relegations in six seasons, condemning them to fourth tier football only a few years after they had been in the top flight. Rotherham United went down in second from bottom place, followed shortly afterwards by Shrewsbury Town and Peterborough United. York City enjoyed a repeat of the 1995-96 season, beginning the campaign by eliminating Premier League opposition from the League Cup (this time Everton rather than Manchester United) and finished one place above the relegation zone, although this time safety was achieved before the final day of the season.

Football League, Second Division
- Season: 1996–97
- Champions: Bury (2nd third tier title)
- Direct promotion: Bury, Stockport County
- Promoted through play-offs: Crewe Alexandra
- Relegated: Notts County, Peterborough United, Rotherham United, Shrewsbury Town
- Matches: 552
- Goals: 1,270 (2.3 per match)
- Top goalscorer: Tony Thorpe (Luton Town), 28

Pos	Team	Pld	W	D	L	GF	GA	GD	Pts	Promotion or relegation
1	Bury (C, P)	46	24	12	10	62	38	+24	84	Promotion to the First Division
2	Stockport County (P)	46	23	13	10	59	41	+18	82	Promotion to the First Division
3	Luton Town	46	21	15	10	71	45	+26	78	Qualification for the Second Division play-offs
4	Brentford	46	20	14	12	56	43	+13	74	Qualification for the Second Division play-offs
5	Bristol City	46	21	10	15	69	51	+18	73	Qualification for the Second Division play-offs
6	Crewe Alexandra (O, P)	46	22	7	17	56	47	+9	73	Qualification for the Second Division play-offs
7	Blackpool	46	18	15	13	60	47	+13	69	
8	Wrexham	46	17	18	11	54	50	+4	69	
9	Burnley	46	19	11	16	71	55	+16	68	
10	Chesterfield	46	18	14	14	42	39	+3	68	
11	Gillingham	46	19	10	17	60	59	+1	67	
12	Walsall	46	19	10	17	54	53	+1	67	
13	Watford	46	16	19	11	45	38	+7	67	
14	Millwall	46	16	13	17	50	55	−5	61	
15	Preston North End	46	18	7	21	49	55	−6	61	
16	Bournemouth	46	15	15	16	43	45	−2	60	
17	Bristol Rovers	46	15	11	20	47	50	−3	56	
18	Wycombe Wanderers	46	15	10	21	51	56	−5	55	
19	Plymouth Argyle	46	12	18	16	47	58	−11	54	
20	York City	46	13	13	20	47	68	−21	52	
21	Peterborough United (R)	46	11	14	21	55	73	−18	47	Relegation to the Third Division
22	Shrewsbury Town (R)	46	11	13	22	49	74	−25	46	Relegation to the Third Division
23	Rotherham United (R)	46	7	14	25	39	70	−31	35	Relegation to the Third Division
24	Notts County (R)	46	7	14	25	33	59	−26	35	Relegation to the Third Division

Rules for classification: In the Football League goals scored (GF) takes precedence over goal difference (GD).
(C) Champions; (O) Play-off winners; (P) Promoted; (R) Relegated

=== Play-offs ===
Semi-finals; 1st leg – 11 May; 2nd leg – 14 May 1997
3rd	Luton Town	1	2	3
6th	Crewe Alexandra	2	2	4
4th	Brentford	2	2	4
5th	Bristol City	1	1	2

Final at Wembley; 25 May 1997
4th	Brentford	0
6th	Crewe Alexandra	1

=== Top scorers ===
Rank	Player	Club	Goals
1	(England) Tony Thorpe	Luton Town	28
2	(England) Paul Barnes	Burnley	24
3	(England) Carl Asaba	Brentford	23
=	(Bermuda) Shaun Goater	Bristol City	23
5	(Scotland) Iffy Onuora	Gillingham	21
6	(Bermuda) Kyle Lightbourne	Walsall	20

=== Results ===
Home \ Away	BLP	BOU	BRE	BRI	BRR	BUR	BRY	CHF	CRE	GIL	LUT	MIL	NTC	PET	PLY	PNE	ROT	SHR	STP	WAL	WAT	WRE	WYC	YOR
Blackpool		1–1	1–0	1–0	3–2	1–3	2–0	0–1	1–2	2–0	0–0	3–0	1–0	5–1	2–2	2–1	4–1	1–1	2–1	2–1	1–1	3–3	0–0	3–0
Bournemouth	0–0		2–1	0–2	1–0	0–0	1–1	3–0	0–1	2–2	3–2	1–1	0–1	1–2	1–0	2–0	1–1	0–0	0–0	0–1	1–2	2–1	2–1	1–1
Brentford	1–1	1–0		0–0	0–0	0–3	0–2	1–0	0–2	2–0	3–2	0–0	2–0	0–1	3–2	0–0	4–2	0–0	2–2	1–1	1–1	2–0	0–0	3–3
Bristol City	0–1	0–1	1–2		1–1	2–1	1–0	2–0	3–0	0–1	5–0	1–1	4–0	2–0	3–1	2–1	0–2	3–2	1–1	4–1	1–1	2–1	3–0	2–0
Bristol Rovers	0–0	3–2	2–1	1–2		1–2	4–3	2–0	2–0	0–0	3–2	1–0	1–0	1–0	2–0	1–0	1–2	2–0	1–1	0–1	0–1	2–0	3–4	1–1
Burnley	2–0	1–0	1–2	2–3	2–2		3–1	0–0	2–0	5–1	0–2	1–0	1–0	5–0	2–1	1–2	3–3	1–3	5–2	2–1	4–1	2–0	2–1	1–2
Bury	1–0	2–1	1–1	4–0	2–1	1–0		1–0	1–0	3–0	0–0	2–0	2–0	1–0	1–0	3–0	3–1	2–0	0–0	2–1	1–1	0–0	2–0	4–1
Chesterfield	0–0	1–1	0–2	1–1	1–0	0–0	1–2		1–0	2–2	1–1	1–0	1–0	2–1	1–2	2–1	1–1	2–1	0–1	1–0	0–0	0–0	4–2	2–0
Crewe Alexandra	3–2	2–0	2–0	1–2	1–0	1–1	2–0	1–2		3–2	0–0	0–0	3–0	1–1	3–0	1–0	1–0	5–1	1–0	1–0	0–2	3–1	3–0	0–1
Gillingham	2–3	1–1	1–2	3–2	1–0	1–0	2–2	0–1	2–1		1–2	2–3	1–0	2–1	4–1	1–1	3–1	2–0	1–0	2–0	3–1	1–2	1–0	0–1
Luton Town	1–0	2–0	1–0	2–2	2–1	1–2	0–0	0–1	6–0	2–1		0–2	2–0	3–0	2–2	5–1	1–0	2–0	1–1	3–1	0–0	0–0	0–0	2–0
Millwall	2–1	0–1	0–0	0–2	2–0	2–1	1–0	2–1	2–0	0–2	0–1		1–0	0–2	0–0	3–2	2–0	2–1	3–4	1–0	0–1	1–1	2–1	1–1
Notts County	1–1	0–2	1–1	2–0	1–1	1–1	0–1	0–0	0–1	1–1	1–2	1–2		0–0	2–1	2–1	0–0	1–2	1–2	2–0	2–3	0–0	1–2	0–1
Peterborough United	0–0	3–1	0–1	3–1	1–2	3–2	1–2	1–1	2–2	0–1	0–1	3–3	1–3		0–0	2–0	6–2	2–2	0–2	0–1	2–1	0–1	6–3	2–2
Plymouth Argyle	0–1	0–0	1–4	0–0	0–1	0–0	2–0	0–3	1–0	2–0	3–3	0–0	0–0	1–1		2–1	1–0	2–2	0–0	2–0	0–0	0–1	0–0	2–1
Preston North End	3–0	0–1	1–0	0–2	0–0	1–1	3–1	0–1	2–1	1–0	3–2	2–1	2–0	3–4	1–1		0–0	2–1	1–0	2–0	1–1	2–1	2–1	1–0
Rotherham United	1–2	1–0	0–1	2–2	0–0	1–0	1–1	0–1	1–4	1–2	0–3	0–0	2–2	2–0	1–2	0–1		1–2	0–1	1–2	0–0	0–0	2–1	0–2
Shrewsbury Town	1–3	1–1	0–3	1–0	2–0	2–1	1–1	2–0	0–1	1–2	0–3	1–1	2–1	2–2	2–3	0–2	0–2		3–2	2–2	1–0	0–1	1–1	2–0
Stockport County	1–0	0–1	1–2	1–1	1–0	1–0	2–1	1–0	1–0	2–1	1–1	5–1	0–0	0–0	3–1	1–0	0–0	3–1		2–0	1–0	0–2	2–1	2–1
Walsall	1–1	2–1	1–0	2–0	1–0	1–3	3–1	1–1	1–0	1–0	3–2	2–1	3–1	4–0	0–1	1–0	1–1	2–2	1–1		1–1	0–1	2–2	1–1
Watford	2–2	0–1	2–0	3–0	1–0	2–2	0–0	0–2	0–1	0–0	1–1	0–2	0–0	0–0	0–2	1–0	2–0	2–0	1–0	1–0		1–1	1–0	4–0
Wrexham	2–1	2–0	0–2	2–1	1–0	0–0	1–1	3–2	1–1	1–1	2–1	3–3	3–3	1–1	4–4	1–0	1–0	2–1	2–3	1–2	3–1		1–0	0–0
Wycombe Wanderers	1–0	1–1	0–1	2–0	2–0	5–0	0–1	1–0	2–0	1–1	0–1	1–0	1–0	2–0	2–1	0–1	4–2	3–0	0–2	0–2	0–0	0–0		3–1
York City	1–0	1–2	2–4	0–3	2–2	1–0	0–2	0–0	1–1	2–3	1–1	3–2	1–2	1–0	1–1	3–1	2–1	0–0	1–2	0–2	1–2	1–0	2–0	

Legend: Blue = home team win; Yellow = draw; Red = away team win.

=== Locations ===
Locations of the Second Division teams

== Third Division ==
In their second season under the management of John Deehan and ownership of ambitious chairman Dave Whelan, Wigan finished champions of Division Three, with striker Graeme Jones being the league's top scorer with 31 goals. Fulham finished runners-up behind them on goals scored in their final season under the chairmanship of Jimmy Hill. The West London club was then taken over by Harrods owner Mohamed al-Fayed. Carlisle United clinched the final automatic promotion spot, one season after relegation. The final promotion place was won by Northampton Town, who ended their seven-year stay in the league's basement division by defeating Swansea City with John Frain goal in the last minute of extra time in the playoff final.

16th placed Leyton Orient made a move for 47-year-old former England goalkeeper Peter Shilton in December, with the veteran shot-stopper making nine league appearances and becoming the first player in English football to make a total of 1,000 league appearances before leaving the Brisbane Road side at the end of the season.

Brighton, deep in debt and faced with being left homeless through the sale of the Goldstone Ground, looked doomed by Christmas as they trailed the rest of the Division Three sides by a long distance. However, an incredible improvement in form during the second half of the season made survival appear like a realistic target by April, and they went into the final game of the season off the bottom of the table against a Hereford United side who were their hosts on the final day. Brighton need at least a draw to survive, while victory would keep Hereford in the league. A Kerry Mayo own goal put the Edgar Street side ahead and Brighton looked set to go down to the Conference a mere 14 years after being FA Cup finalists and side in the old First Division, before equalizing late on in the game through new signing Robbie Reinelt, securing their Division Three survival and ending Hereford's 25-year stay in the league. Brighton were then faced with several weeks of uncertainty about their future as the search for a new home continued, ending when a groundsharing deal was agreed with Gillingham in Kent.

Coming up from the Conference were Macclesfield Town, who had overturned a wide lead by Kidderminster Harriers during the second half of the season to clinch the Conference title on the final day of the season and claim the Football League status which they had been denied two years earlier when their Moss Rose stadium failed to meet the league's capacity requirements. The necessary work had since taken place, ensuring that the Cheshire side did not suffer the same disappointment again.

Football League, Third Division
- Season: 1996–97
- Champions: Wigan Athletic (1st fourth tier title)
- Direct promotion: Wigan Athletic, Carlisle United, Fulham
- Promoted through play-offs: Northampton
- Relegated to Conference: Hereford United
- Matches: 552
- Goals: 1,385 (2.51 per match)
- Top goalscorer: Graeme Jones (Wigan Athletic), 31

Pos	Team	Pld	W	D	L	GF	GA	GD	Pts	Promotion or relegation
1	Wigan Athletic (C, P)	46	26	9	11	84	51	+33	87	Promotion to the Second Division
2	Fulham (P)	46	25	12	9	72	38	+34	87	Promotion to the Second Division
3	Carlisle United (P)	46	24	12	10	67	44	+23	84	Promotion to the Second Division
4	Northampton Town (O, P)	46	20	12	14	67	44	+23	72	Qualification for the Third Division play-offs
5	Swansea City	46	21	8	17	62	58	+4	71	Qualification for the Third Division play-offs
6	Chester City	46	18	16	12	55	43	+12	70	Qualification for the Third Division play-offs
7	Cardiff City	46	20	9	17	56	54	+2	69	Qualification for the Third Division play-offs
8	Colchester United	46	17	17	12	62	51	+11	68	
9	Lincoln City	46	18	12	16	70	69	+1	66	
10	Cambridge United	46	18	11	17	53	59	−6	65	
11	Mansfield Town	46	16	16	14	47	45	+2	64	
12	Scarborough	46	16	15	15	65	68	−3	63	
13	Scunthorpe United	46	18	9	19	59	62	−3	63	
14	Rochdale	46	14	16	16	58	58	0	58	
15	Barnet	46	14	16	16	46	51	−5	58	
16	Leyton Orient	46	15	12	19	50	58	−8	57	
17	Hull City	46	13	18	15	44	50	−6	57	
18	Darlington	46	14	10	22	64	78	−14	52	
19	Doncaster Rovers	46	14	10	22	52	66	−14	52	
20	Hartlepool United	46	14	9	23	53	66	−13	51	
21	Torquay United	46	13	11	22	46	62	−16	50	
22	Exeter City	46	12	12	22	48	73	−25	48	
23	Brighton & Hove Albion	46	13	10	23	53	70	−17	47 (Note: Brighton & Hove Albion had two points deducted for failure to control spectators.)	
24	Hereford United (R)	46	11	14	21	50	65	−15	47	Relegation to Football Conference

Rules for classification: In the Football League goals scored (GF) takes precedence over goal difference (GD).
(C) Champions; (O) Play-off winners; (P) Promoted; (R) Relegated

=== Play-offs ===
Semi-finals; 1st leg – 11 May; 2nd leg – 14 May 1997
4th	Northampton Town	1	3	4
7th	Cardiff City	0	2	2
5th	Swansea City	0	3	3
6th	Chester City	0	0	0

Final at Wembley; 24 May 1997
4th	Northampton Town	1
5th	Swansea City	0

=== Top scorers ===
Rank	Player	Club	Goals
1	(England) Graeme Jones	Wigan Athletic	31
2	(England) Gareth Ainsworth	Lincoln City	22
3	(Scotland) Mike Conroy	Fulham	21
4	(Scotland) Colin Cramb	Doncaster Rovers	18
5	(England) Adrian Foster	Hereford United	16
=	(England) Darren Roberts	Darlington	16

=== Locations ===
Locations of the Third Division teams

=== Results ===
Home \ Away	BAR	BHA	CAM	CAR	CRL	CHE	COL	DAR	DON	EXE	FUL	HAR	HER	HUL	LEY	LIN	MAN	NOR	ROC	SCA	SCU	SWA	TOR	WIG
Barnet		3–0	2–1	3–1	0–0	1–2	2–4	0–0	3–0	3–0	2–2	1–0	2–3	1–0	0–0	1–0	1–1	1–1	3–2	1–3	1–1	0–1	0–0	1–1
Brighton & Hove Albion	1–0		1–2	2–0	1–3	2–1	1–1	2–3	1–0	1–0	0–0	5–0	0–1	3–0	4–4	1–3	1–1	2–1	3–0	3–2	1–1	3–2	2–2	1–0
Cambridge United	1–0	1–1		0–2	1–3	2–2	1–0	5–2	0–1	3–2	0–1	1–0	0–1	1–0	2–0	1–3	2–1	0–0	2–2	2–1	0–2	2–1	2–1	1–1
Cardiff City	1–2	1–0	0–0		2–0	1–0	1–2	2–0	0–2	2–1	1–2	2–0	2–0	2–0	3–0	1–3	1–2	2–2	2–1	1–1	0–0	1–3	2–0	0–2
Carlisle United	2–1	2–1	3–0	0–2		3–1	3–0	1–0	0–0	2–0	1–2	1–0	2–3	0–0	1–0	1–0	1–1	2–1	3–2	1–0	3–2	4–1	5–1	0–3
Chester	1–0	2–1	1–1	0–1	1–1		1–2	2–1	6–0	2–1	1–1	0–0	1–3	0–0	0–1	4–1	1–0	2–1	0–0	1–0	1–0	2–0	0–0	1–1
Colchester United	1–0	2–0	2–2	1–1	1–1	0–0		0–3	2–2	1–0	2–1	0–2	1–1	1–1	2–1	7–1	2–1	0–0	1–0	1–3	1–1	3–1	2–0	3–1
Darlington	0–1	2–0	2–0	2–1	2–1	1–1	1–1		0–3	0–1	0–2	1–2	1–0	1–0	1–1	5–2	2–4	3–1	1–1	1–1	2–0	4–1	2–3	3–1
Doncaster Rovers	1–1	3–0	2–1	3–3	0–1	0–1	0–0	3–2		1–2	0–0	2–1	1–0	0–0	2–1	1–3	0–0	1–2	3–0	1–2	1–1	0–1	2–1	2–0
Exeter City	1–1	2–1	0–1	2–0	2–1	1–5	0–3	3–2	1–1		0–1	2–0	1–1	0–0	3–2	3–3	0–0	0–1	0–0	2–2	0–1	1–2	1–1	0–1
Fulham	2–0	2–0	3–0	1–4	1–0	1–1	3–1	6–0	3–1	1–1		1–0	1–0	2–0	1–1	1–2	1–2	0–1	1–1	4–0	2–1	2–1	1–2	1–1
Hartlepool United	4–0	2–3	0–2	2–3	1–2	2–0	1–0	1–2	2–4	1–1	2–1		2–1	1–1	3–1	2–1	2–2	0–2	1–2	1–0	0–1	1–1	1–1	1–1
Hereford United	1–1	1–1	0–1	1–1	2–3	1–2	1–0	1–1	1–0	1–2	0–0	0–1		0–1	2–0	1–1	0–1	1–2	3–0	2–2	3–2	0–1	1–1	3–1
Hull City	0–0	3–0	1–3	1–1	0–1	1–0	1–2	3–2	3–1	2–0	0–3	1–0	1–1		3–2	2–1	1–1	1–1	1–1	0–2	0–2	1–1	2–0	1–1
Leyton Orient	0–1	2–0	1–1	3–0	2–1	0–0	1–1	0–0	2–1	1–1	0–2	2–0	2–1	1–1		2–3	2–1	2–1	2–1	0–1	0–1	1–0	1–0	1–2
Lincoln City	1–0	2–1	1–1	2–0	1–1	0–0	3–2	2–0	3–2	2–3	2–0	2–1	3–2	0–1	1–1		0–0	1–1	0–2	1–1	2–0	4–0	1–2	1–3
Mansfield Town	0–0	1–1	1–0	1–3	0–0	0–2	1–1	2–1	1–0	0–1	0–0	1–0	3–1	1–0	0–2	2–2		1–0	0–0	2–0	2–0	0–0	1–2	0–1
Northampton Town	2–0	3–0	1–2	4–0	1–1	5–1	2–1	3–1	2–0	4–1	0–1	3–0	1–0	2–1	0–1	1–1	3–0		2–2	1–0	1–0	1–2	1–1	0–1
Rochdale	1–1	3–0	3–0	1–0	2–2	0–1	0–0	2–0	2–1	2–0	1–2	1–3	0–0	1–2	1–0	2–0	0–1	1–1		3–3	1–2	2–3	2–1	3–1
Scarborough	1–1	1–1	1–0	0–0	1–1	0–0	1–1	4–1	2–1	3–4	0–2	2–4	1–1	3–2	2–1	0–2	2–1	1–1	2–2		3–2	0–1	3–1	3–1
Scunthorpe United	1–2	1–0	3–2	0–1	0–0	0–2	2–1	3–2	1–2	4–1	1–4	2–1	5–1	2–2	1–2	2–0	0–2	2–1	2–2	0–2		1–0	1–0	2–3
Swansea City	3–0	1–0	3–1	0–1	0–1	2–1	1–1	1–1	2–0	3–1	1–2	2–2	4–0	0–0	1–0	1–2	3–2	1–0	2–1	1–2	1–1		2–0	2–1
Torquay United	1–2	2–1	0–1	2–0	1–2	0–0	0–2	1–1	1–0	2–0	3–1	0–1	2–1	1–1	0–0	2–1	1–2	1–2	0–1	1–0	1–2	2–0		0–3
Wigan Athletic	2–0	1–0	1–1	0–1	1–0	4–2	1–0	3–2	4–1	2–0	1–1	2–2	4–1	1–2	5–1	1–0	2–0	2–1	0–1	7–1	3–0	3–2	3–2	

Updated to match(es) played on 5 November 2020. Source:
Legend: Blue = home team win; Yellow = draw; Red = away team win.

== See also ==
- 1996–97 in English football
