= 1996 Football League First Division play-off final =

Association football match in London

- Wembley Stadium
Crystal Palace	Leicester City
1	2
- after extra time
- Date: 27 May 1996
- Venue: Wembley Stadium, London
- Referee: David Allison (Lancaster)
- Attendance: 73,573

The 1996 Football League First Division play-off final was an association football match which was played on 27 May 1996 at Wembley Stadium, London, between Crystal Palace and Leicester City. The match was to determine the third and final team to gain promotion from the Football League First Division, the second tier of English football, to the Premiership. The top two teams of the 1995–96 Football League First Division season gained automatic promotion to the Premiership, while the clubs placed from third to sixth place in the table took part in play-off semi-finals; the winners of these semi-finals competed for the final place for the 1996–97 season in the Premiership. Crystal Palace ended the season in third position, two places ahead of Leicester City. They beat Charlton Athletic and Stoke City, respectively, in the semi-finals.

The match was played in front of a crowd of 73,573 and was refereed by David Allison from Lancaster. Leicester dominated the early stages of the game but Palace took the lead on 14 minutes with a strike from Andy Roberts. In the 76th minute, Marc Edworthy brought down Muzzy Izzet in the Palace penalty area. Nigel Martyn managed to get a hand to the spot kick but could not stop it going in and levelling the score at 1–1. The game went into extra time and the final minute of the additional period of play, Leicester, anticipating a penalty shootout, substituted in 6 ft 7 in (2.01 m) tall goalkeeper Zeljko Kalac. Seconds later, Steve Claridge struck the winning goal from a Julian Watts header, and eleven seconds after that, the referee blew the final whistle. Leicester won 2–1 and gained promotion to the Premier League.

Winning the final marked Leicester City's fifth promotion since they were relegated in the 1968–69 season. In their following season, they finished in ninth place in the Premier League and also won the League Cup. Crystal Palace ended their next campaign in sixth place in the First Division, and were promoted via the play-offs, winning the final 1–0 against Sheffield United with a last-minute goal.

== Route to the final ==
Football League First Division final table, leading positions
Pos	Team	Pld	W	D	L	GF	GA	GD	Pts
1	Sunderland	46	22	17	7	59	33	+26	83
2	Derby County	46	21	16	9	71	51	+20	79
3	Crystal Palace	46	20	15	11	67	55	+12	75
4	Stoke City	46	20	13	13	60	49	+11	73
5	Leicester City	46	19	14	13	66	60	+6	71
6	Charlton Athletic	46	17	20	9	57	45	+12	71

Crystal Palace finished the regular 1995–96 season in third place in the Football League First Division, the second tier of the English football league system, two places and four points ahead of Leicester City. Both therefore missed out on the two automatic places for promotion to the Premiership and instead took part in the play-offs, along with Stoke City and Charlton Athletic, to determine the third promoted team. Crystal Palace finished four points behind Derby County (who were promoted in second place) and eight behind league winners Sunderland.

Leicester City's opponents in their play-off semi-final were Stoke City, with the first match of the two-legged tie being played at Filbert Street in Leicester on 12 May 1996. The match finished goalless with Kevin Poole, the home team's goalkeeper, making a save in the fifth minute from Graham Potter. Michael Walker, writing in The Guardian, compared the save to Gordon Banks' "save of the century" against Pelé. The second leg was played three days later at the Victoria Ground in Stoke. After a goalless first half, Garry Parker put Leicester City ahead just 30 seconds into the second. He had been restored to the team after ten games following a disagreement with manager Martin O'Neill, and his volley from a Scott Taylor cross made it 1–0 to the visitors. Leicester City won the tie 1–0 on aggregate and progressed to the final.

Crystal Palace faced Charlton Athletic in the other semi-final; the first leg took place at The Valley on 12 May 1996. Charlton took the lead in the first minute when Shaun Newton capitalised on a rebound from Palace's goalkeeper Nigel Martyn. In the 65th minute, Kenny Brown (who was on loan from West Ham United) scored the equaliser with a volley. Six minutes later Carl Veart's header from a George Ndah overhead kick made it 2–1 to Crystal Palace. The return leg took place three days later at Selhurst Park. Ray Houghton scored after three minutes with a floated shot into the far top corner of Charlton's goal. David Whyte had a second-half goal disallowed for Charlton after he was adjudged to have been offside. The match ended 1–0, and 3–1 on aggregate to Crystal Palace.

== Match ==
=== Background ===
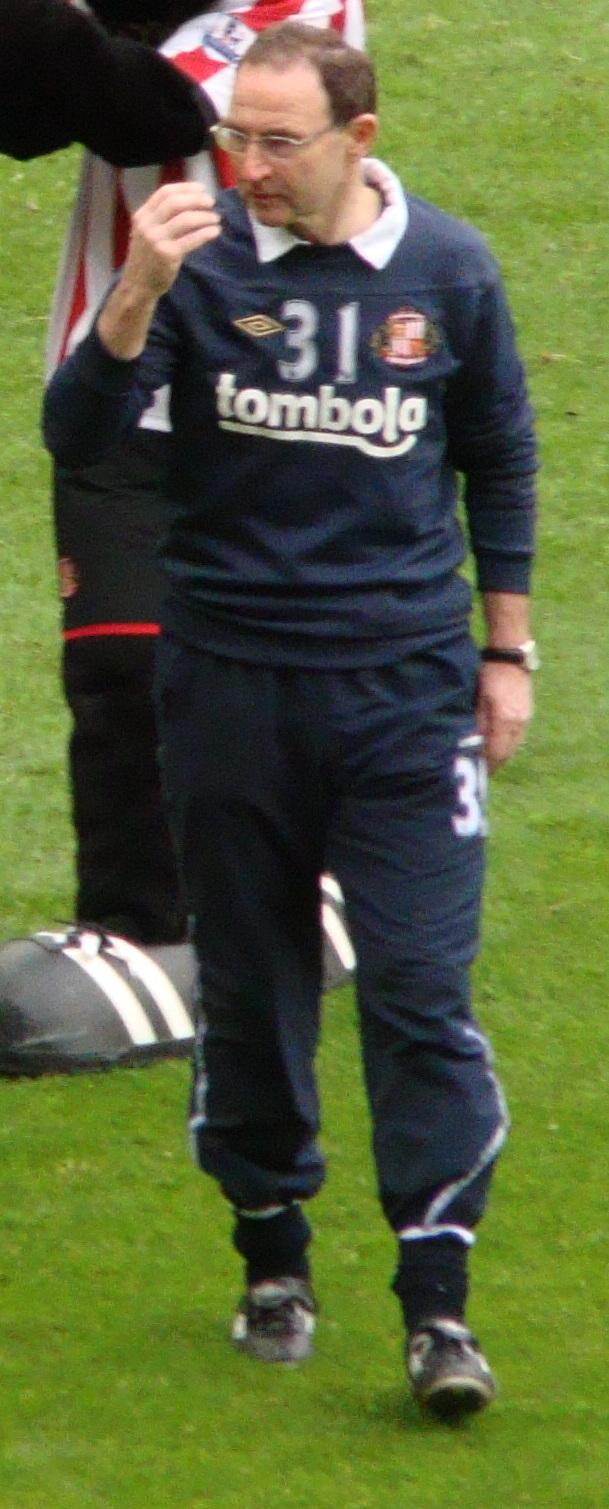
Martin O'Neill (pictured in 2012) was Leicester City manager.

This was Crystal Palace's second appearance in the second-tier play-off final, having won the 1989 final (over two legs) against Blackburn Rovers. Leicester were appearing in their fourth second-tier play-off final. They had lost in both 1992 and 1993, but won 2–1 against Derby County in the 1994 final to gain promotion to the Premiership. Both clubs were aiming for an instant return to the Premiership having been relegated in the 1994–95 season when they finished in the bottom four. In the meetings between the two clubs during the regular season, the away side won each time: Crystal Palace won 3–2 in October 1995 while Leicester secured a 1–0 victory the following April. Leicester City's top scorers were Iwan Roberts with 20 goals (19 in the league and 1 in the League Cup) and Emile Heskey on 7 (all in the league). Roberts had not played since 9 April, however, when he sustained a rib injury against West Bromwich Albion after a collision with Stacy Coldicott. Although it was reported in the media that Roberts had recovered, he was not selected for the squad for the play-off final. Mark Robins had scored 10 goals in all competitions for Leicester City, with 6 in the league and 4 in the 1995–96 Football League Cup. Dougie Freedman had scored the most goals for Crystal Palace during the regular season with 20, all in the league, while Dyer was second-top scorer with a total of 14 goals (13 in the league, 1 in the FA Cup).

Crystal Palace's Dave Bassett was seeking the seventh promotion of his managerial career. He had taken over at the club four months prior to the final, and led them from sixteenth in the league to third with a run of just four defeats in twenty-two games. O'Neill had been Leicester manager since December 1995 when he left Norwich City after claiming the chairman Robert Chase was not providing sufficient financial support. Despite criticism from fans who were dissatisfied with Leicester's style of play during O'Neill's early tenure, and failing to win in his first nine matches, the team ended the regular season undefeated in their last seven games and qualified for the play-offs on the final day. O'Neill had previously managed a team at Wembley, leading Wycombe Wanderers to victory in the 1994 Football League Third Division play-off final and two FA Trophy victories.

There was speculation in the media that if Leicester failed to be promoted, they would sell Heskey, with Liverpool being favourites to buy him. Conversely, should Leicester be promoted, it was reported that O'Neill would make a bid for Keith O'Neill who he managed when at Norwich City. Leicester City's midfielder Taylor had played for Reading, who had lost the previous season's First Division play-off final, and said he was keen to make amends: "It's an awful feeling to be beaten at Wembley ... I'm bursting for the opportunity to put it right". Leicester City's Steve Walsh, who had featured for his club in their previous three play-off finals and scored three times, appeared resolute: "Winning is the only thing ... You cannot enjoy losing any final. After so much hard work, after all you've gone through, it's awful."

Thomas Russell of The Guardian anticipated that Rob Quinn would make his third start for Crystal Palace. He had replaced the injured Leif Anderson in the second leg of their play-off semi-final against Charlton Athletic. Martyn, the Crystal Palace goalkeeper, was to play despite carrying an elbow injury for which he needed corrective surgery, while Hopkin remained an injury doubt. The final was broadcast live in the United Kingdom on ITV as part of The Big Match programme. Bookmakers considered Crystal Palace to be the favourites. The referee for the match was David Allison from Lancaster. Crystal Palace adopted a 3–5–2 formation while Leicester played as 4–4–2.

=== Summary ===
The final kicked off around 3 p.m. on 27 May 1996 in front of a crowd of 73,573 at Wembley Stadium. Leicester dominated the early stages of the game but Palace took the lead on 14 minutes: Andy Roberts struck the ball from the edge of the box past Kevin Poole in the Leicester goal.

In the second half, Poole saved a shot from George Ndah and then almost immediately defended a volley from Freedman. In the 76th minute, Walsh passed to Izzet who was brought down in the Palace penalty area by Marc Edworthy. Martyn managed to get a hand to the spot kick but it was not enough to stop it going in and levelling the score at 1–1. Veart then cleared Walsh's header off the line with three minutes of regular time remaining, and the game went into extra time. In the final minute of the additional 30-minute period, Leicester made their final substitution of the game to bring on 6 ft 7 in (2.01 m) tall goalkeeper Zeljko Kalac in anticipation of a penalty shootout.

With less than a minute remaining, Steve Claridge struck the winning goal from a Julian Watts header, and eleven seconds later, the referee blew the final whistle. Leicester won 2–1 and gaining promotion to the Premier League.

=== Details ===
27 May 1996
15:00 BST

Leicester City	2–1 (a.e.t.)	Crystal Palace
Parker 76' (pen.); Claridge 120'	Report	Roberts 14'

Wembley Stadium, London
Attendance: 73,573
Referee: David Allison (Lancaster)

Leicester City	Crystal Palace

GK	1	Kevin Poole	(substituted off) 119'
RB	2	Simon Grayson
CB	4	Julian Watts
CB	5	Steve Walsh (c)	(substituted off) 118'
LB	3	Mike Whitlow
RM	10	Garry Parker
CM	6	Muzzy Izzet
CM	7	Neil Lennon
LM	8	Scott Taylor	(substituted off) 101'
CF	11	Emile Heskey
CF	9	Steve Claridge
Substitutes:
FW	12	Mark Robins	(substituted on) 101'
GK	13	Zeljko Kalac	(substituted on) 119'
DF	14	Colin Hill	(substituted on) 118'
Manager:
Martin O'Neill

GK	1	Nigel Martyn
RWB	7	Darren Pitcher
CB	2	Marc Edworthy
CB	3	Kenny Brown
CB	10	Dave Tuttle (c)	(substituted off) 102'
LWB	5	Rob Quinn
CM	6	David Hopkin	(substituted off) 71'
CM	4	Andy Roberts
CM	8	Ray Houghton
CF	9	Dougie Freedman	(substituted off) 99'
CF	11	George Ndah
Substitutes:
MF	12	Carl Veart	(substituted on) 71'
MF	13	Simon Rodger	(substituted on) 102'
FW	14	Bruce Dyer	(substituted on) 99'
Manager:
Dave Bassett

== Post-match ==
O'Neill was jubilant and thankful that a penalty shootout was avoided: "We just about deserved to win it, and that's an understatement. We played brilliantly, but I didn't fancy penalties. I think I would have committed suicide had we lost". He went on to add that "this has to be one of the best moments of my life". Journeyman Claridge, who had moved to Leicester City from Birmingham City in March, described his winning strike as "the most important goal of my life" but admitted that it "went in off my shin". He added that he was "dreading penalties" having converted just one spot kick from six attempts during his career. In an interview 20 years later, Claridge refuted that he had scored off his shin, claiming "It didn't hit my shin, that was a stupid thing to say ... I hit it properly and sweet".

Bassett remarked that "[t]his has happened to me three times" and said his team deserved to take the game to penalties. Neil Robinson in The Guardian reported that O'Neill was given a £5 million budget to make additions to the Leicester City squad.

Winning the final marked Leicester City's fifth promotion since they were relegated in the 1968–69 season. In their following season, they finished in ninth place in the Premier League. They also won the League Cup with the winning goal coming from Claridge in extra time in a replay, after the first final was drawn, and ensuring the club qualified for European football. Crystal Palace ended their next campaign in sixth place in the First Division, and were promoted via the play-offs, winning the final 1–0 against Sheffield United with a last-minute goal.
