= 1994 Football League Third Division play-off final =

- Wembley Stadium
- Event: 1993–94 Football League Third Division
Wycombe Wanderers	Preston North End
4	2
- Date: 28 May 1994
- Venue: Wembley Stadium, London
- Referee: Keith Cooper
- Attendance: 40,109

The 1994 Football League Third Division play-off final was an association football match played on 28 May 1994 at the Wembley Stadium, London, between Wycombe Wanderers and Preston North End. The match determined the fourth and final team to gain promotion from the Football League Third Division, English football's fourth tier, to the Second Division. The top three teams of the 1993–94 Third Division season gained automatic promotion to the Second Division, while the teams placed from fourth to seventh took part in play-off semi-finals, the winners of which competed for the final place for the 1994–95 season in the Second Division. Wycombe Wanderers finished the season in fourth place, and Preston North End in fifth. They defeated Carlisle United and Torquay United, respectively, in the semi-finals.

The referee for the match, played in front of 40,109 spectators, was Keith Cooper. Wycombe dominated the first half but in the 32nd minute, Preston took the lead through Ian Bryson with an overhead kick which beat Paul Hyde in the Wycombe goal. Wycombe equalised straight from the subsequent kick-off with Steve Thompson's shot being put into the net by Jamie Squires for an own goal. In the 37th minute, Preston took the lead once more, with Paul Raynor's diving header; the half ended 2–1. Wycombe drew level two minutes into the second with a goal from Simon Garner. Ten minutes later, a four-man play from Wycombe concluded with Steve Guppy's cross being passed by Garner to Dave Carroll who scored at the far post to make it 3–2. Fifteen minutes later Carroll scored his second after beating David Moyes 18 yards (16 metres) out from goal, making it 4–2. No further goals were scored and Wycombe were promoted to the Second Division at their first attempt.

In their following season, Wycombe Wanderers finished in sixth place in the Second Division, one place outside the play-offs. Preston North End ended their next season in fifth position in the Third Division, qualifying for the play-offs, but losing their semi-final to Bury.

== Route to the final ==
Football League Third Division final table, leading positions
Pos	Team	Pld	W	D	L	GF	GA	GD	Pts
1	Shrewsbury Town	42	22	13	7	63	39	+24	79
2	Chester City	42	21	11	10	69	46	+23	74
3	Crewe Alexandra	42	21	10	11	80	61	+19	73
4	Wycombe Wanderers	42	19	13	10	67	53	+14	70
5	Preston North End	42	18	13	11	79	60	+19	67
6	Torquay United	42	17	16	9	64	56	+8	67
7	Carlisle United	42	18	10	14	57	42	+15	64

Wycombe Wanderers finished the regular 1993–94 season in fourth place in the Football League Third Division, the fourth tier of the English football league system, one place ahead of Preston North End. Both therefore missed out on the three automatic places for promotion to the Second Division and instead took part in the play-offs to determine the fourth promoted team. Wycombe Wanderers finished three points behind Crewe Alexandra (who were promoted in third place), four behind Chester City (who were promoted in second place), and nine behind league winners Shrewsbury Town. Preston North End ended the season three points behind Wycombe Wanderers.

Preston North End's opponents in their play-off semi-final were Torquay United, and the first match of the two-legged tie took place at Plainmoor in Torquay on 15 May 1994. The home side dominated the first half with Duane Darby scoring from close range in the 20th minute to make it 1–0 after Steve Woods in the Preston goal pushed out Paul Buckle's 20-yard (18-metre) shot. Darren Moore then doubled the lead with a volley in the 57th minute. With ten minutes remaining, Torquay goalkeeper Ashley Bayes saved a strike from Tony Ellis and the match ended 2–0. The second leg of the semi-final was held three days later at Deepdale in Preston. It was the last match to take place on Preston's plastic pitch. Ellis scored with a header to put Preston ahead but Torquay's Gregory Goodridge equalised after going one-on-one with Woods. In the 36th minute, Moore was sent off for punching Paul Raynor and seven minutes later David Moyes headed in Preston's second goal to make it 2–1 at half-time. A goal from Stuart Hicks made it 3–1 and levelled the tie on aggregate, sending the game into extra time. With four minutes remaining, Raynor scored with a header to make it 4–1, and Preston progressed to the final with a 4–3 aggregate victory.

Wycombe Wanderers faced Carlisle United in the second semi-final; the first leg took place at Brunton Park in Carlisle on 15 May 1994. The visitors took the lead in the 33rd minute: David Titterton played a one-two with Steve Guppy before striking a low cross to Simon Garner, whose shot was blocked by Tony Gallimore, but the ball fell to Steve Thompson, who scored from close range. Carlisle dominated the second half but were caught in the 86th minute by Garner on the break who made it 2–0, the final score. The second leg of the semi-final was played three days later at Adams Park in High Wycombe. The home side took an early lead with Dave Carroll heading in a Guppy cross in the eleventh minute. Garner then doubled the lead in the 57th minute after wrong-footing Tony Caig in the Carlisle goal. With ten minutes remaining, Rod Thomas was brought down in the penalty area and awarded a penalty. Simon Davey scored from the spot to make it 2–1, but Wycombe progressed to the final with a 4–1 aggregate win.

== Match ==
=== Background ===
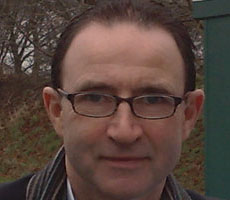
Martin O'Neill was the Wycombe Wanderers manager.

Preston North End had participated in the play-offs once before, losing in the 1989 semi-finals to Port Vale. Preston had played in the Third Division since winning promotion from the Fourth Division in the 1986–87 season. Preston's last competitive match at Wembley Stadium was the 1964 FA Cup Final, where they had lost 3–2 to West Ham United. Wycombe Wanderers had gained promotion from non-League football when they finished the 1992–93 Football Conference as champions and as such were making their first appearance in the play-offs in their first season in the Football League. They had played at the national stadium the previous season, defeating Runcorn in the 1993 FA Trophy final. In the matches between the sides during the regular season, Wycombe had won 3–2 at Deepdale in November 1993 while the return fixture at Adams Park the following May ended in a 1–1 draw.

The referee for the match was Keith Cooper. Both sides adopted a 4–4–2 formation.

=== Summary ===
The final kicked off at around 3 p.m. on 28 May 1994 in front of 40,109 spectators at Wembley Stadium. Guppy's shot hit the Preston goalkeeper Woods and was deflected over the crossbar. Ian Bryson became the first player of the match to be shown the yellow card in the 16th minute. Four minutes later, Garner struck a shot high over the bar after Guppy's pass put him through. On 30 minutes Carroll's lob was caught by Woods. Wycombe were dominant, but in the 32nd minute Preston took the lead: Ellis flicked the ball on at the near post, and Bryson's overhead kick beat Paul Hyde in the Wycombe goal. Wycombe equalised straight from the subsequent kick-off: Thompson went clear after a through ball from Garner, and an attempt by Preston's Jamie Squires to defend Thompson's strike put the ball into the net for an own goal. In the 37th minute, Preston took the lead once more, with Raynor's diving header from an Ellis cross, and the half ended with the score at 2–1.

Neither side made any changes to their personnel during the interval and Wycombe drew level two minutes into the second with a goal from Garner. Titterton's pass found the Wycombe striker who ran past Squires and struck past Woods. Preston's Gareth Ainsworth was then booked in the 49th minute. Eight minutes later, a four-man play from Wycombe concluded with Guppy's cross being passed by Garner to Carroll who scored at the far post to make it 3–2. On 61 minutes, Glyn Creaser became the first Wycombe player to be shown the yellow card. Eleven minutes later Carroll scored his second after beating Moyes 18 yards (16 metres) out from goal to make it 4–2. Garner was then booked in the 75th minute. No further goals were scored and Wycombe were promoted to the Second Division at their first attempt.

=== Details ===
28 May 1994	Wycombe Wanderers	4–2	Preston North End	Wembley Stadium, London
15:00 UTC	Thompson 33'; Garner 47'; Carroll 55', 68'		Bryson 32'; Raynor 37'	Attendance: 40,109

GK	1	Paul Hyde
RB	2	Jason Cousins
CB	3	David Titterton
CB	4	Matt Crossley
LB	5	Glyn Creaser (yellow card) 61'
RM	6	Keith Ryan
CM	7	Dave Carroll
CM	8	Steve Thompson
FW	9	Nicky Reid
FW	10	Simon Garner (yellow card) 75'
LM	11	Steve Guppy
Manager:
Martin O'Neill

GK	1	Stevie Woods
RB	2	Andy Fensome
CB	3	Ryan Kidd
CB	4	Lee Cartwright
LB	5	Jamie Squires
RM	6	David Moyes
CM	7	Gareth Ainsworth (yellow card) 49'
CM	8	Neil Whalley
FW	9	Paul Raynor
FW	10	Tony Ellis
LM	11	Ian Bryson (yellow card) 16'
Manager:
John Beck

== Post-match ==
Wycombe Wanderers manager Martin O'Neill suggested "everything we have tried to do at the club has come right today" but was cautious about the future noting "we obviously need to strengthen the side". Wycombe's promotion meant they became the first champions of the Conference to be promoted in their first season in the Football League. It also meant they had secured back-to-back promotions having been promoted from non-League football the previous season. John Beck, the defeated Preston manager, conceded that Wycombe deserved the victory: "Justice was done".

In their following season, Wycombe Wanderers finished in sixth place in the Second Division, one place and three points outside the play-offs. Preston North End ended their next season in fifth position in the Third Division, qualifying for the play-offs, but losing at the semi-final stage to Bury.
