= 1996–97 Leicester City F.C. season =

1996–97 season of Leicester City

Leicester City F.C.
1996–97 season
- Chairman: Tom Smeaton
- Manager: Martin O'Neill
- Stadium: Filbert Street
- FA Premier League: 9th
- FA Cup: Fifth round
- League Cup: Winners
- Player of the Year: Simon Grayson
- Top goalscorer: League: Steve Claridge (11); All: Steve Claridge (14)
- Highest home attendance: 21,134 vs Newcastle United (26 October 1996, FA Premier League)
- Lowest home attendance: 10,793 vs Scarborough (25 September 1996, League Cup)
- Average home league attendance: 20,182
Home colours	Away colours	Third colours

During the 1996–97 English football season, Leicester City F.C. competed in the FA Premier League.

== Season summary ==
Most observers had tipped Leicester for an immediate return to Division One, so Martin O'Neill's ultimate task for this season was to achieve survival for Leicester. However, he defied many of the pre-season predictions by finishing 9th in the table. Leicester's season was capped by a victory over Middlesbrough in the League Cup final to win their first major trophy for 33 years and their passport to the following season's UEFA Cup.

== Final league table ==
Pos	Team	Pld	W	D	L	GF	GA	GD	Pts	Qualification or relegation
7	Sheffield Wednesday	38	14	15	9	50	51	−1	57	
8	Wimbledon	38	15	11	12	49	46	+3	56	
9	Leicester City	38	12	11	15	46	54	−8	47	Qualification for the UEFA Cup first round (Note: Leicester City qualified for the UEFA Cup as League Cup winners.)
10	Tottenham Hotspur	38	13	7	18	44	51	−7	46	
11	Leeds United	38	11	13	14	28	38	−10	46	

Source: Premier League
Rules for classification: 1) points; 2) goal difference; 3) number of goals scored.
Notes:

Results summary

Overall								Home						Away					
Pld	W	D	L	GF	GA	GD	Pts	W	D	L	GF	GA	GD	W	D	L	GF	GA	GD
38	12	11	15	46	54	−8	47	7	5	7	22	26	−4	5	6	8	24	28	−4

Source: Statto

Results by round

Round	1	2	3	4	5	6	7	8	9	10	11	12	13	14	15	16	17	18	19	20	21	22	23	24	25	26	27	28	29	30	31	32	33	34	35	36	37	38
Ground	A	H	H	A	A	H	A	H	H	A	H	A	A	H	A	A	H	H	A	H	A	H	H	A	H	A	H	A	H	H	A	A	A	A	H	H	H	A
Result	D	W	L	L	D	L	W	W	L	L	W	L	W	L	L	W	D	L	D	D	L	W	D	L	W	W	W	D	L	D	D	D	L	L	L	D	W	W
Position	11	7	12	13	14	16	14	10	12	14	11	13	10	12	14	12	12	13	13	12	16	12	13	14	12	10	9	10	11	11	11	11	13	13	14	16	12	9

Source: Statto.com
A = Away; H = Home; W = Win; D = Draw; L = Loss

== Results ==
Win Draw Loss

=== Pre-season ===
24 July 1996	Penzance	2–4	Leicester City	Penzance
			Robins (?); Harrington (?); Campbell (?)	Stadium: Penlee Park

27 July 1996	Torpoint Athletic	0–5	Leicester City	Torpoint
			Robins (?); Hallam (?); Izzet (?); Wilson (?)	Stadium: The Mill

29 July 1996	Shepshed Dynamo	1–2	Leicester City	Leicester
			Wilson (?); Akeredolu (o.g.)	Stadium: The Dovecote Stadium

2 August 1996	Dundee United	2–1	Leicester City	Dundee
			Izzet (?)	Stadium: Tannadice Park

5 August 1996	PAOK (Greece)	3–0	Leicester City	Thessaloniki
				Stadium: Toumba Stadium

7 August 1996	Kettering Town	2–1	Leicester City	Kettering
			Whitlow (?)	Stadium: Rockingham Road

9 August 1996	Bournemouth	1–1	Leicester City	Bournemouth
19:45 BST			Izzet (?)	Stadium: Dean Court

11 August 1996	Peterborough United	1–1	Leicester City	Peterborough
15:00 BST	Charlery (?)		Walsh (?)	Stadium: London Road Stadium

=== FA Premier League ===
17 August 1996	Sunderland	0–0	Leicester City	Sunderland
15:00 BST				Stadium: Roker Park; Attendance: 19,262; Referee: Stephen Lodge

21 August 1996	Leicester City	2–1	Southampton	Leicester
19:45 BST	Heskey 6', 42'		Le Tissier 68' (pen.); Venison (red card) 82'	Stadium: Filbert Street; Attendance: 17,562; Referee: Mike Riley

24 August 1996	Leicester City	0–2	Arsenal	Leicester
15:00 BST			Bergkamp 27' (pen.); Wright 90'	Stadium: Filbert Street; Attendance: 20,429; Referee: Graham Barber

2 September 1996	Sheffield Wednesday	2–1	Leicester City	Sheffield
20:00 BST	Humphreys 25'; Booth 51'		Claridge 28'	Stadium: Hillsborough; Attendance: 17,657; Referee: Gary Willard

7 September 1996	Nottingham Forest	0–0	Leicester City	Nottingham
15:00 BST				Stadium: City Ground; Attendance: 24,105; Referee: Paul Alcock

15 September 1996	Leicester City	0–3	Liverpool	Leicester
15:00 BST			Berger 58', 77'; Thomas 61'	Stadium: Filbert Street; Attendance: 20,987; Referee: Paul Durkin

22 September 1996	Tottenham Hotspur	1–2	Leicester City	London
16:00 BST	Wilson 64' (pen.)		Claridge 22'; Marshall 86'	Stadium: White Hart Lane; Attendance: 24,159; Referee: Alan Wilkie

28 September 1996	Leicester City	1–0	Leeds United	Leicester
15:00 BST	Heskey 60'			Stadium: Filbert Street; Attendance: 20,359; Referee: Steve Dunn

12 October 1996	Leicester City	1–3	Chelsea	Leicester
15:00 BST	Watts 44'		Vialli 48'; Di Matteo 64'; M. Hughes 80'	Stadium: Filbert Street; Attendance: 20,766; Referee: Mike Reed

19 October 1996	West Ham United	1–0	Leicester City	London
20:00 BST	Moncur 78'		Walsh (red card) 87'	Stadium: Upton Park; Attendance: 22,285; Referee: Mike Riley

26 October 1996	Leicester City	2–0	Newcastle United	Leicester
15:00 BST	Claridge 17'; Heskey 79'			Stadium: Filbert Street; Attendance: 21,134; Referee: Graham Poll

2 November 1996	Derby County	2–0	Leicester City	Derby
15:00 GMT	Ward 56'; Whitlow 89' (o.g.)			Stadium: Baseball Ground; Attendance: 18,010; Referee: Graham Barber

16 November 1996	Aston Villa	1–3	Leicester City	Birmingham
15:00 GMT	Yorke 15'		Claridge 8'; Parker 43' (pen.); Izzet 85'	Stadium: Villa Park; Attendance: 36,193; Referee: David Elleray

23 November 1996	Leicester City	1–2	Everton	Leicester
15:00 GMT	Walsh 83'		Hinchcliffe 12'; Unsworth 52'	Stadium: Filbert Street; Attendance: 20,975; Referee: Jeff Winter

30 November 1996	Manchester United	3–1	Leicester City	Manchester
15:00 GMT	Butt 75', 87'; Solskjær 85'		Lennon 90'	Stadium: Old Trafford; Attendance: 55,196; Referee: Martin Bodenham

3 December 1996	Middlesbrough	0–2	Leicester City	Middlesbrough
19:45 GMT			Claridge 45'; Izzet 46'	Stadium: Riverside Stadium; Attendance: 29,709; Referee: Paul Alcock

7 December 1996	Leicester City	1–1	Blackburn Rovers	Leicester
15:00 GMT	Marshall 78'		Sutton 34'	Stadium: Filbert Street; Attendance: 19,306; Referee: Mike Riley

21 December 1996	Leicester City	0–2	Coventry City	Leicester
15:00 GMT			Dublin 12', 72'	Stadium: Filbert Street; Attendance: 20,038; Referee: Frazer Stretton

26 December 1996	Liverpool	1–1	Leicester City	Liverpool
15:00 GMT	Collymore 80'		Claridge 76'	Stadium: Anfield; Attendance: 40,786; Referee: Alan Wilkie

28 December 1996	Leicester City	2–2	Nottingham Forest	Leicester
15:00 GMT	Heskey 10'; Izzet 63'		Clough 37'; Cooper 87'	Stadium: Filbert Street; Attendance: 20,833; Referee: Keith Burge

11 January 1997	Leeds United	3–0	Leicester City	Leeds
15:00 GMT	Bowyer 40'; Rush 45', 69'			Stadium: Elland Road; Attendance: 29,486; Referee: Mike Reed

18 January 1997	Leicester City	1–0	Wimbledon	Leicester
15:00 GMT	Heskey 73'			Stadium: Filbert Street; Attendance: 18,927; Referee: Stephen Lodge

29 January 1997	Leicester City	1–1	Sunderland	Leicester
19:45 GMT	Parker 32' (pen.)		Williams 18'	Stadium: Filbert Street; Attendance: 17,883; Referee: Steve Dunn

2 February 1997	Newcastle United	4–3	Leicester City	Newcastle
16:00 GMT	Elliott 3'; Shearer 77', 83', 90'		Elliott 55'; Claridge 60'; Heskey 68'	Stadium: St James' Park; Attendance: 36,396; Referee: Mike Reed

22 February 1997	Leicester City	4–2	Derby County	Leicester
15:00 GMT	Marshall 7', 24', 27'; Claridge 59'		Sturridge 2', 47'	Stadium: Filbert Street; Attendance: 20,323; Referee: Paul Durkin

1 March 1997	Wimbledon	1–3	Leicester City	London
15:00 GMT	Holdsworth 66'		Elliott 17', 27'; Robins 32'	Stadium: Selhurst Park; Attendance: 11,487; Referee: Gerald Ashby

5 March 1997	Leicester City	1–0	Aston Villa	Leicester
19:45 GMT	Claridge 66'			Stadium: Filbert Street; Attendance: 20,626; Referee: Graham Poll

8 March 1997	Coventry City	0–0	Leicester City	Coventry
15:00 GMT				Stadium: Highfield Road; Attendance: 19,220; Referee: Paul Alcock

15 March 1997	Leicester City	1–3	Middlesbrough	Leicester
15:00 GMT	Marshall 47'		Blackmore 9'; Juninho 27'; Beck 36'	Stadium: Filbert Street; Attendance: 20,561; Referee: Stephen Lodge

19 March 1997	Leicester City	1–1	Tottenham Hotspur	Leicester
19:45 GMT	Claridge 74'		Sheringham 90'	Stadium: Filbert Street; Attendance: 20,593; Referee: Roger Dilkes

22 March 1997	Southampton	2–2	Leicester City	Southampton
15:00 GMT	Østenstad 32' van Gobbel 48'		Heskey 46'; Neilson (o.g.)	Stadium: The Dell; Attendance: 15,044; Referee: Keith Burge

9 April 1997	Everton	1–1	Leicester City	Liverpool
15:00 BST	Branch 17'		Marshall 70'	Stadium: Goodison Park; Attendance: 30,368; Referee: Steve Dunn

12 April 1997	Arsenal	2–0	Leicester City	London
15:00 GMT	Adams 35'; Platt 66'			Stadium: Highbury; Attendance: 38,044; Referee: Stephen Lodge

19 April 1997	Chelsea	2–1	Leicester City	London
15:00 GMT	Minto 13'; M. Hughes 73'		Sinclair 47' (o.g.)	Stadium: Stamford Bridge; Attendance: 27,723; Referee: Alan Wilkie

23 April 1997	Leicester City	0–1	West Ham United	Leicester
19:45 GMT			Moncur 75'	Stadium: Filbert Street; Attendance: 20,327; Referee: Roger Dilkes

3 May 1997	Leicester City	2–2	Manchester United	Leicester
11:15 GMT	Walsh 16'; Marshall 20'		Solskjær 45', 51'	Stadium: Filbert Street; Attendance: 21,068; Referee: Alan Wilkie

7 May 1997	Leicester City	1–0	Sheffield Wednesday	Leicester
19:45 GMT	Elliott 86'			Stadium: Filbert Street; Attendance: 20,793; Referee: Gerald Ashby

11 May 1997	Blackburn Rovers	2–4	Leicester City	Blackburn
16:00 GMT	Flitcroft 25'; Fenton 66'		Heskey 13', 56'; Claridge 55'; Wilson 81'	Stadium: Ewood Park; Attendance: 25,881; Referee: Steve Dunn

=== FA Cup ===
15 January 1997 R3	Leicester City	2–0	Southend United	Leicester
19:45 GMT	Claridge 40'; Marshall 48'			Stadium: Filbert Street; Attendance: 13,982

25 January 1997 R4	Leicester City	2–1	Norwich City	Leicester
15:00 GMT	Marshall 32'; Lennon (yellow card) (yellow-red card); Parker 67' (pen.)		Jackson (yellow card) (yellow-red card); Adams 39' (pen.)	Stadium: Filbert Street; Attendance: 16,703

16 February 1997 R5	Leicester City	2–2	Chelsea	Leicester
15:00 GMT	Walsh 52'; Newton 88' (o.g.)		Di Matteo 16'; Hughes 35'	Stadium: Filbert Street; Attendance: 19,125; Referee: Mike Reed

26 February 1997 R5 Replay	Chelsea	1–0 (a.e.t.)	Leicester City	London
19:45 GMT	Leboeuf 117' (pen.)			Stadium: Stamford Bridge; Attendance: 26,053; Referee: Mike Reed

=== League Cup ===
17 September 1996 R2 1st leg	Scarborough	0–2	Leicester City	Scarborough
19:45 BST			Izzet 9'; Lawrence 81'	Stadium: McCain Stadium; Attendance: 4,168

25 September 1996 R2 2nd leg	Leicester City	2–1 (4–1 agg.)	Scarborough	Leicester
19:45 BST	Lawrence 40'; Parker 90' (pen.)		Ritchie 77'	Stadium: Filbert Street; Attendance: 10,793

22 October 1996 R3	York City	0–2	Leicester City	York
19:45 BST			Lennon 60'; Grayson 86'	Stadium: Bootham Crescent; Attendance: 8,406

27 November 1996 R4	Leicester City	2–0	Manchester United	Leicester
19:45 GMT	Claridge 38'; Heskey 77'			Stadium: Filbert Street; Attendance: 20,428

21 January 1997 QF	Ipswich Town	0–1	Leicester City	Ipswich
19:45 GMT			Robins 42'	Stadium: Portman Road; Attendance: 19,000; Referee: David Elleray

18 February 1997 SF 1st leg	Leicester City	0–0	Wimbledon	Leicester
19:45 GMT				Stadium: Filbert Street; Attendance: 16,021; Referee: Stephen Lodge

11 March 1997 SF 2nd leg	Wimbledon	1–1 (a.e.t.) (1–1(a) agg.)	Leicester City	London
19:45 GMT	Gayle 23'		Grayson 53'	Stadium: Selhurst Park; Attendance: 17,810; Referee: Alan Wilkie

6 April 1997 Final	Leicester City	1–1 (a.e.t.)	Middlesbrough	London
15:00 BST	Heskey 118'	Report	Ravanelli 95'	Stadium: Wembley Stadium; Attendance: 76,757; Referee: Martin Bodenham

16 April 1997 Final Replay	Leicester City	1–0 (a.e.t.)	Middlesbrough	Sheffield
19:45 BST	Claridge 100'	Report		Stadium: Hillsborough; Attendance: 39,428; Referee: Martin Bodenham

== First-team squad ==
Squad at end of season

Note: Flags indicate national team as defined under FIFA eligibility rules; some limited exceptions apply. Players may hold more than one non-FIFA nationality.

No.	Pos.	Nation	Player
1	GK	ENG	Kevin Poole
2	DF	ENG	Simon Grayson
3	DF	ENG	Mike Whitlow
4	DF	ENG	Julian Watts
5	DF	ENG	Steve Walsh (captain)
6	MF	TUR	Muzzy Izzet
7	MF	NIR	Neil Lennon
8	MF	ENG	Scott Taylor
9	FW	ENG	Steve Claridge
10	MF	ENG	Garry Parker
11	FW	ENG	Emile Heskey
12	FW	ENG	Mark Robins
13	GK	USA	Kasey Keller

No.	Pos.	Nation	Player
14	DF	ENG	Colin Hill
15	DF	SWE	Pontus Kåmark
16	DF	FRA	Franck Rolling
17	DF	ENG	Spencer Prior
18	DF	SCO	Matt Elliott (vice-captain)
19	DF	ENG	Rob Ullathorne
20	FW	ENG	Ian Marshall
21	MF	JAM	Jamie Lawrence
22	DF	ENG	Neil Lewis
24	MF	ENG	Steve Guppy
25	MF	ENG	Stuart Wilson
26	MF	SCO	Stuart Campbell
28	MF	GER	Sascha Lenhart

=== Left club during season ===
Note: Flags indicate national team as defined under FIFA eligibility rules; some limited exceptions apply. Players may hold more than one non-FIFA nationality.

No. / Pos. / Nation / Player; 24 / DF / ENG / Jimmy Willis (retired)	No. / Pos. / Nation / Player; 24 / MF / ENG / Stuart Slater (to Watford)

=== Reserve squad ===
Note: Flags indicate national team as defined under FIFA eligibility rules; some limited exceptions apply. Players may hold more than one non-FIFA nationality.

No.	Pos.	Nation	Player
23	MF	ENG	Sam McMahon
27	FW	ENG	Justin Harrington
29	GK	ENG	Paul Hyde

No.	Pos.	Nation	Player
30	GK	ENG	Ian Andrews
33	DF	ENG	Martin Fox

== Transfers ==
=== In ===
Date	Pos.	Name	From	Fee
17 August 1996	DF	(England) Spencer Prior	(England) Norwich City	£600,000
17 August 1996	GK	(United States) Kasey Keller	(England) Millwall	£900,000
31 August 1996	FW	(England) Ian Marshall	(England) Ipswich Town	£800,000
1 September 1996	MF	(Germany) Sascha Lenhart	(Belgium) Royal Antwerp	Free transfer
16 January 1997	DF	(Scotland) Matt Elliott	(England) Oxford United	£1,600,000
17 February 1997	DF	(England) Robert Ullathorne	(Spain) Osasuna	£600,000
28 February 1997	MF	(England) Steve Guppy	(England) Port Vale	£850,000

=== Out ===
Date	Pos.	Name	To	Fee
23 August 1996	MF	(England) Mark Blake	(England) Walsall	Free transfer
27 November 1996	MF	(England) Stuart Slater	(England) Watford	Free transfer
14 March 1997	GK	(England) Paul Hyde	(England) Leyton Orient	Free transfer
22 June 1997	DF	(England) Jamie Lawrence	(England) Bradford City	£50,000
22 June 1997	DF	(England) Neil Lewis	(England) Peterborough United	£75,000
26 June 1997	DF	(England) Simon Grayson	(England) Aston Villa	£1,300,000

Transfers in: ▼£5,350,000
Transfers out: ▲£1,425,000
Total spending: ▼£3,925,000
