= Midfielder =

Association football position

The midfield positions highlighted in relation to other positions in association football

In association football, a midfielder takes an outfield position primarily in the middle of the pitch. Midfielders may play an exclusively defensive role breaking up attacks, and are in that case known as defensive midfielders. As central midfielders often go across boundaries, with mobility and passing ability, they are often referred to as deep-lying midfielders, playmakers, box-to-box midfielders, or holding midfielders. There are also attacking midfielders with limited defensive assignments, who often play further up the pitch, and have a greater role in the offensive aspect of the game, namely scoring goals or creating chances for teammates.

The number of midfielders on a team and their assigned roles depend on which formation is used; the area these players operate in on the pitch is commonly referred to as the midfield. Its name derives from the middle part of the pitch.

Managers frequently assign one or more midfielders to disrupt the opposing team's attacks, while others may be tasked with creating goals, or have equal responsibilities between attack and defence. Midfielders are the players who typically travel the greatest distance during a match. Midfielders arguably have the most possession during a game, and thus, they are some of the fittest players on the pitch. Midfielders are often assigned the task of assisting forwards to create scoring opportunities.

== Central midfielder ==
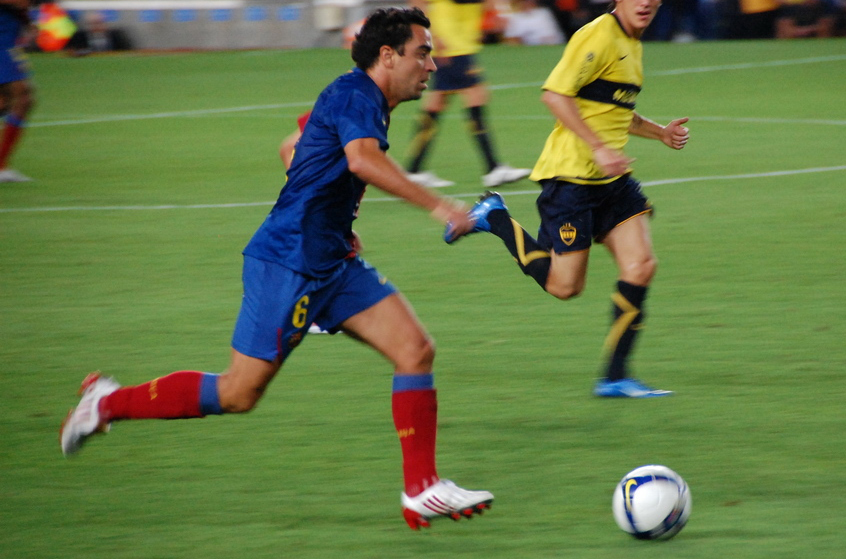
Spanish midfielder Xavi was known for his passing and vision with Barcelona.

Central midfielders are players whose role is divided between attacking and defensive duties to control the play in and around the centre of the pitch. These players will try to pass the ball to the team's attacking midfielders and forwards and may also help their team's attacks by making runs into the opposition's penalty area and attempting shots on goal themselves. They also provide secondary support to attackers, both in and out of possession.

When the opposing team has the ball, a central midfielder may drop back to protect the goal or move forward and press the opposition ball-carrier to recover the ball. A centre midfielder defending their goal will move in front of their centre-backs to block long shots by the opposition and track opposition midfielders making runs towards the goal. The 4–3–3 and 4–5–1 formations each use three central midfielders. The 4−4−2 formation may use two central midfielders, and in the 4–2–3–1 formation one of the two deeper midfielders may be a central midfielder.

=== Box-to-box midfielder ===
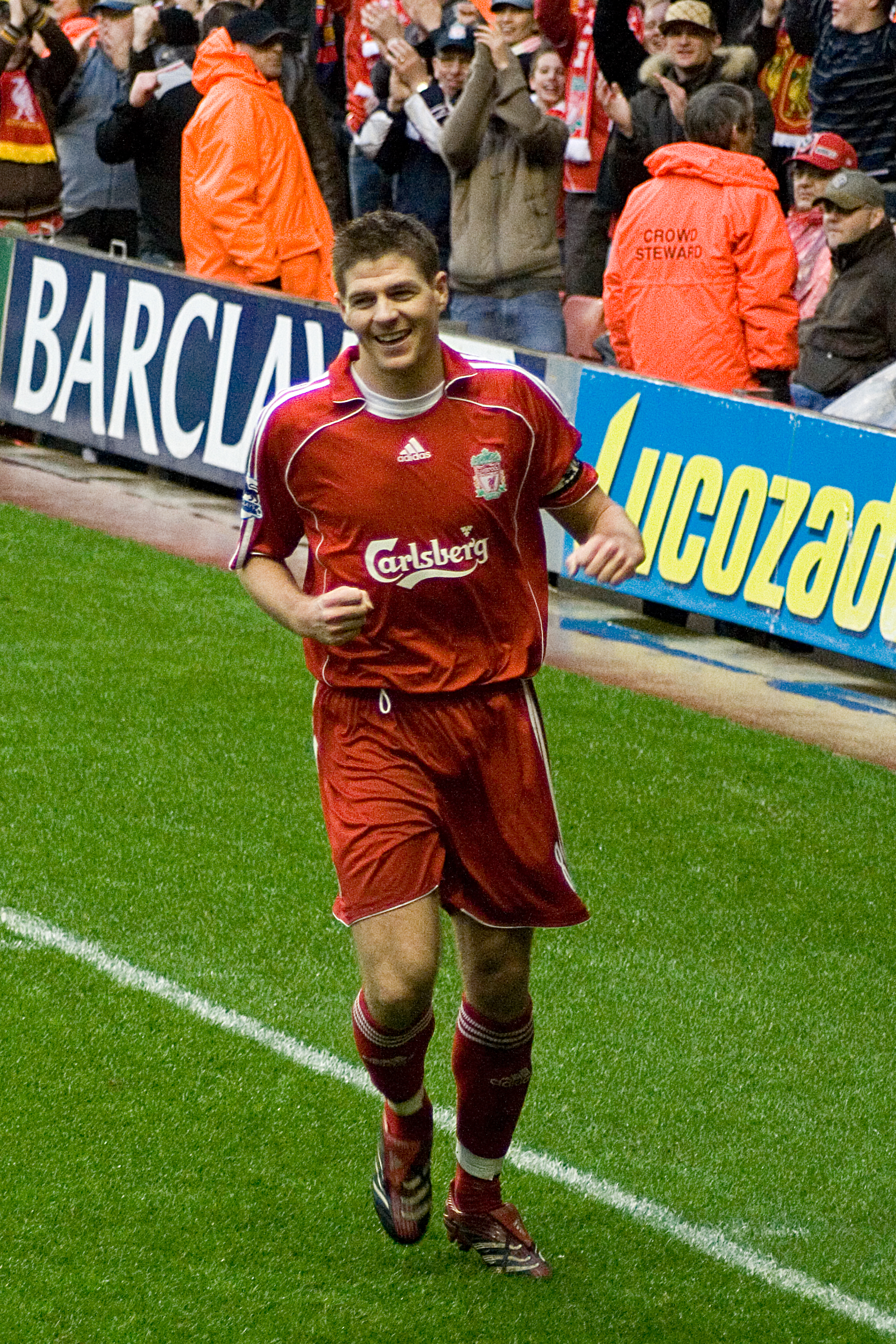
A box-to-box midfielder, Steven Gerrard has been lauded for his effectiveness both offensively and defensively at Liverpool.

The term box-to-box midfielder refers to central midfielders who are hard-working and who have good all-round abilities, which makes them skilled at both defending and attacking. These players can therefore track back to their own box to make tackles and block shots and also carry the ball forward or run to the opponents' box to try to score. Beginning in the mid-2000s, the change of trends and the decline of the standard 4–4–2 formation (in many cases making way for the 4–2–3–1 and 4–3–3 formations) imposed restrictions on the typical box-to-box midfielders of the 1980s and 1990s, as teams' two midfield roles were now often divided into "holders" or "creators", with a third variation upon the role being described as that of a "carrier" or "surger". Notable examples of box-to-box midfielders are Lothar Matthäus, Michael Ballack, Clarence Seedorf, Bastian Schweinsteiger, Luka Modrić, Steven Gerrard, Johan Neeskens, Sócrates, Yaya Touré, Arturo Vidal, Patrick Vieira, Frank Lampard, Bryan Robson, Roy Keane, and more recently, Jude Bellingham and Declan Rice.

=== Mezzala ===
In Italian football, the term mezzala (literally "half-winger" in Italian) is used to describe the position of the one or two central midfielders who play on either side of a holding midfielder, playmaker, or both. The term was initially applied to the role of an inside forward in the WM and Metodo formations in Italian, but later described a specific type of central midfielder. The mezzala is often a quick and hard-working attack-minded midfielder, with good skills and noted offensive capabilities, as well as a tendency to make overlapping attacking runs, but also a player who participates in the defensive aspect of the game, and who can give width to a team by drifting out wide; as such, the term can be applied to several different roles. In English, the term has come to be seen as a variant of the box-to-box midfielder role.

== Defensive midfielder ==
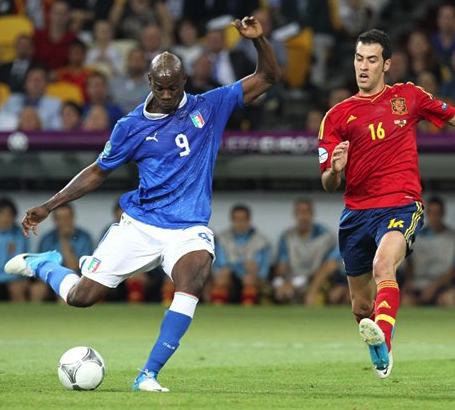
Spain holding midfielder Sergio Busquets (16, red) moves to block a shot from Italian striker (9, blue) Mario Balotelli.

Defensive midfielders are midfield players who focus on protecting their team's goal. These players may defend a zone in front of their team's defence, and performance analyst Amr Ehab Emara considers them to be part of the defensive line because of their defensive responsibilities, or man mark specific opposition attackers. Defensive midfielders may also move to the full-back or centre-back positions if those players move forward to join in an attack.

Sergio Busquets described his attitude: "The coach knows that I am an obedient player who likes to help out, and if I have to run to the wing to cover someone's position, great." A good defensive midfielder needs good positional awareness, anticipation of the opponent's play, marking, tackling, interceptions, passing, and great stamina and strength (for their tackling). In South American football, this role is known as a volante de marca, while in Mexico it is known as volante de contención. In Portugal, it is instead known as trinco.

=== Holding midfielder ===
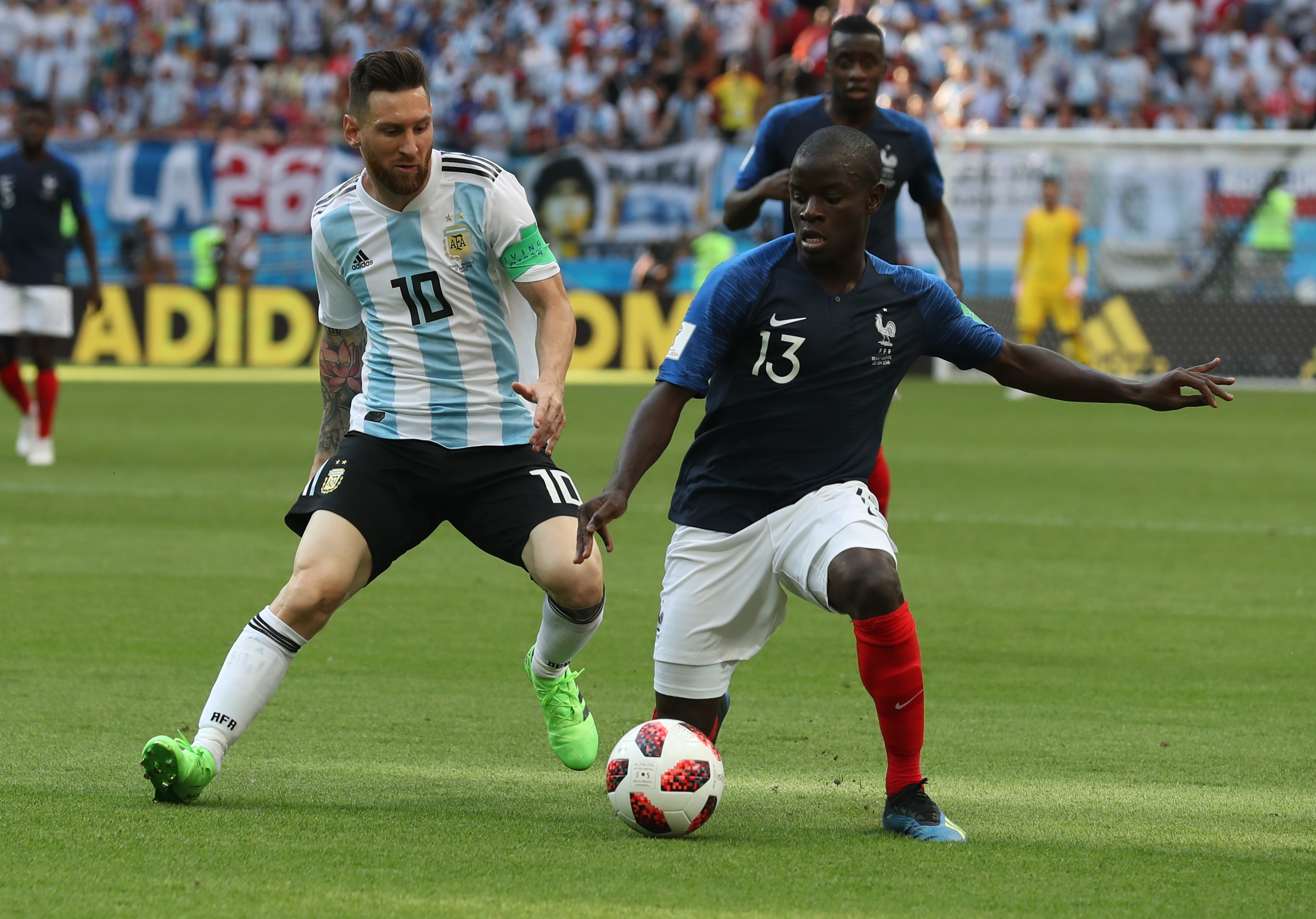
France's N'Golo Kanté (right), duelling for possession with Argentina's Lionel Messi at the 2018 FIFA World Cup, has been used as a holding midfielder, and has been described as a destroyer with carrying tendencies.

A holding or deep-lying midfielder stays close to their team's defence, while other midfielders may move forward to attack. The holding midfielder may also have responsibilities when their team has the ball. This player will make mostly short and simple passes to more attacking members of their team, but may try some more difficult passes depending on the team's strategy. Marcelo Bielsa is considered a pioneer in the use of a holding midfielder in defence. This position may be seen in the 4–2–3–1 and 4–4–2 diamond formations. Writer Jonathan Wilson has identified three different types of holding midfielder, namely the destroyer, the creator, and the carrier.

…we knew that Zidane, Raúl and Figo didn't track back, so we had to put a guy in front of the back four who would defend.

— Arrigo Sacchi describes Real Madrid's need for Claude Makélélé as a holding midfielder.

Initially, a defensive midfielder, or "destroyer", and a playmaker, or "creator", were often fielded alongside each other as a team's two holding central midfielders. The destroyer was usually responsible for making tackles, regaining possession, and distributing the ball to the creator, while the creator was responsible for retaining possession and keeping the ball moving, often with long passes out to the flanks, in the manner of a more old-fashioned deep-lying playmaker or regista (see below). Earlier examples of a destroyer are Nobby Stiles, Herbert Wimmer, and Marco Tardelli, while later examples include Claude Makélélé and Javier Mascherano. Early examples of a creator would be Gérson, Glenn Hoddle, and Sunday Oliseh, while more recent examples are Xabi Alonso, Michael Carrick and Keira Walsh.

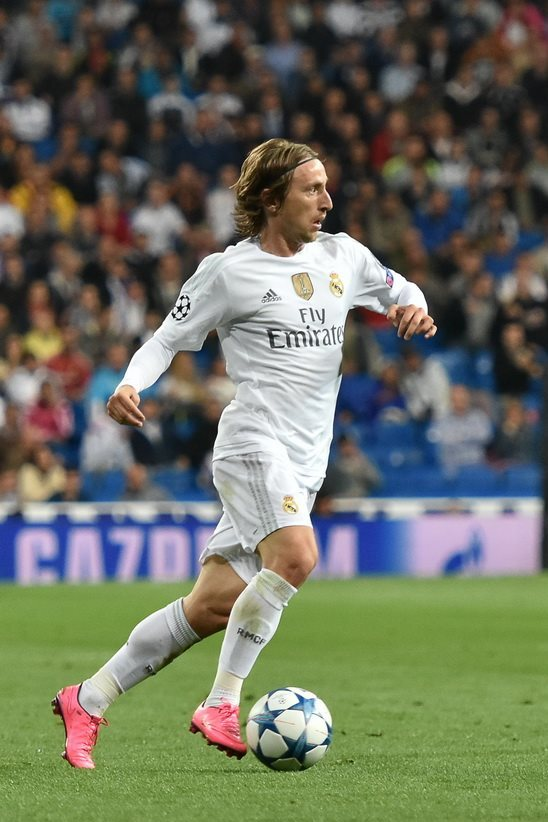
Croatian midfielder Luka Modrić was regarded as an emblematic "box-to-box" playmaker with Real Madrid.

The latest and third type of holding midfielder developed as a box-to-box midfielder, or "carrier" or "surger", neither entirely destructive nor creative, who is capable of winning back possession and subsequently advancing from deeper positions either by distributing the ball to a teammate and making late runs into the box, or by carrying the ball themselves; recent examples of this type of player are Clarence Seedorf and Bastian Schweinsteiger, while Sami Khedira and Fernandinho are destroyers with carrying tendencies. Luka Modrić is known as a carrier with several qualities of the regista, widely seen as emblematic of box-to-box playmaking. Yaya Touré was a carrier who became a playmaker later in his career. N'Golo Kanté started as the quintessential destroyer, but developed carrying tendencies under Antonio Conte at Chelsea.

=== Deep-lying playmaker ===
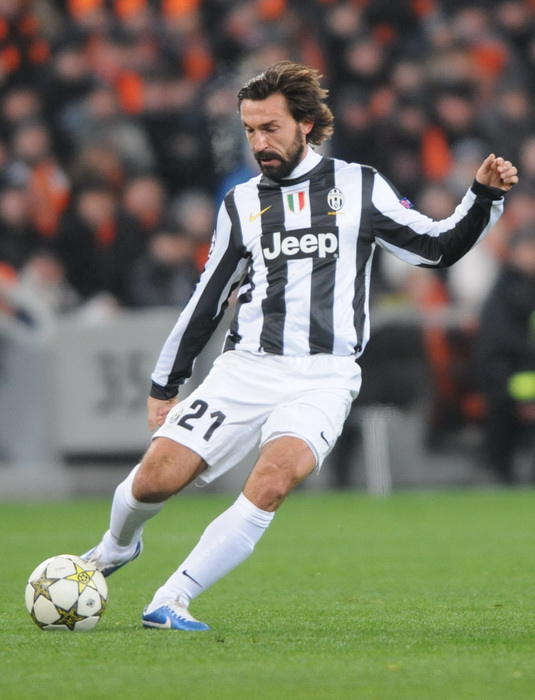
Italian deep-lying playmaker Andrea Pirlo, often regarded as one of the best players ever in the position, with Juventus.

A deep-lying playmaker (Strolling 10) is a holding midfielder who specialises in ball skills such as passing, rather than defensive skills like tackling. When this player has the ball, they may attempt longer or more complex passes than other holding players. They may try to set the tempo of their team's play, retain possession, or build plays through short exchanges, or they may try to pass the ball long to a centre forward or winger, or even pass short to a teammate in the hole, the area between the opponents' defenders and midfielders.

In Italy, the deep-lying playmaker is known as a regista, whereas in Brazil, it is known as a "meia-armador". In Italy, the role of the regista developed from the centre half-back or centromediano metodista position in Vittorio Pozzo's metodo system (a precursor of the central or holding midfield position in the 2–3–2–3 formation), as the metodista's responsibilities were not entirely defensive but also creative; as such, the metodista was not solely tasked with breaking down possession, but also with starting attacking plays after winning back the ball.

Writer Jonathan Wilson instead described Xabi Alonso's holding midfield role as that of a "creator", a player who was responsible for retaining possession in the manner of a more old-fashioned deep-lying playmaker or regista, noting that: "although capable of making tackles, [Alonso] focused on keeping the ball moving, occasionally raking long passes out to the flanks to change the angle of attack."

2–3–5 formation: the wing-halves (yellow) flank the centre half.

=== Centre-half ===
The historic central half-back position gradually retreated from the midfield line to provide increased protection to the back line against centre-forwards – that dedicated defensive role in the centre is still commonly referred to as a "centre-half" as a legacy of its origins. In Italian football jargon, this position was known as the centromediano metodista or metodista, as it became an increasingly important role in Vittorio Pozzo's metodo system, although this term was later also applied to describe players who operated in a central holding-midfielder role, but who also had creative responsibilities in addition to defensive duties.

== Attacking midfielder ==
An attacking midfielder is a midfield or forward player who is positioned in an advanced midfield position, usually between central midfield and the team's forwards, and who has a primarily offensive role.

Some attacking midfielders are called trequartista or fantasista (Italian: three-quarter specialist, i.e. a creative playmaker between the forwards and the midfield), who are usually mobile, creative and highly skillful players, known for their deft touch, technical ability, dribbling skills, vision, ability to shoot from long range, and passing prowess.

However, not all attacking midfielders are trequartistas—some attacking midfielders are very vertical and are essentially auxiliary attackers who serve to link-up play, hold up the ball, or provide the final pass, i.e., secondary strikers. As with any attacking player, the role of the attacking midfielder involves being able to create space for attack.

According to positioning along the field, attacking midfield may be divided into left, right and central attacking midfield roles, but most importantly, they are a striker behind the forwards. A central attacking midfielder may be referred to as a playmaker, or number 10 (due to the association of the number 10 shirt with this position).

=== Advanced playmaker ===
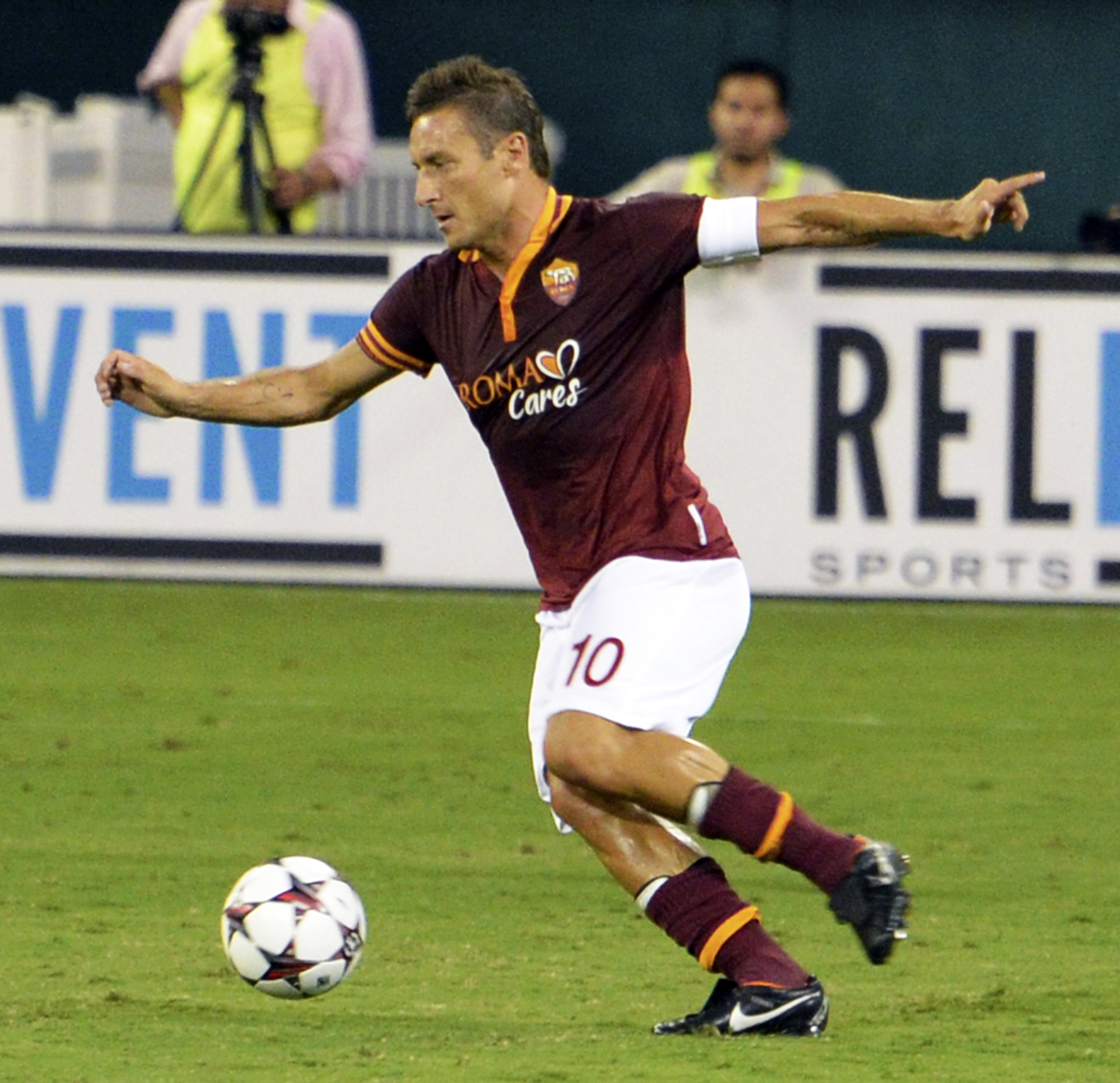
Italian offensive playmaker Francesco Totti in action for Roma in 2013

These players typically serve as the offensive pivot of the team, and are sometimes said to be "playing in the hole", although this term can also be used as a deep-lying forward. The attacking midfielder is an important position that requires the player to possess superior technical abilities in terms of passing and dribbling, as well as, perhaps more importantly, the ability to read the opposing defence to deliver defence-splitting passes to the striker.

This specialist midfielder's main role is to create good shooting and goal-scoring opportunities using superior vision, control, and technical skill, by making crosses, through balls, and headed knockdowns to teammates. They may try to set up shooting opportunities for themselves by dribbling or performing a give-and-go with a teammate. Attacking midfielders may also make runs into the opponents' penalty area to shoot from another teammate's pass.

Where a creative attacking midfielder, i.e. an Advanced playmaker, is regularly utilised, they are commonly the team's star player, and often wear the number 10 shirt. As such, a team is often constructed to allow its attacking midfielder to roam free and create as the situation demands. One such popular formation is the 4–4–2 "diamond" (or 4–1–2–1–2), in which defined attacking and defensive midfielders replace the more traditional pair of central midfielders. Known as the "fantasista" or trequartista in Italy, in Spain, the offensive playmaker is known as the Mediapunta, in Brazil, the offensive playmaker is known as the meia atacante, whereas in Argentina and Uruguay, it is known as the enganche. Some examples of the advanced playmaker would be Zico, Francesco Totti, Lionel Messi, Diego Maradona, Kevin De Bruyne, James Rodríguez, Willem van Hanegem and Michel Platini.

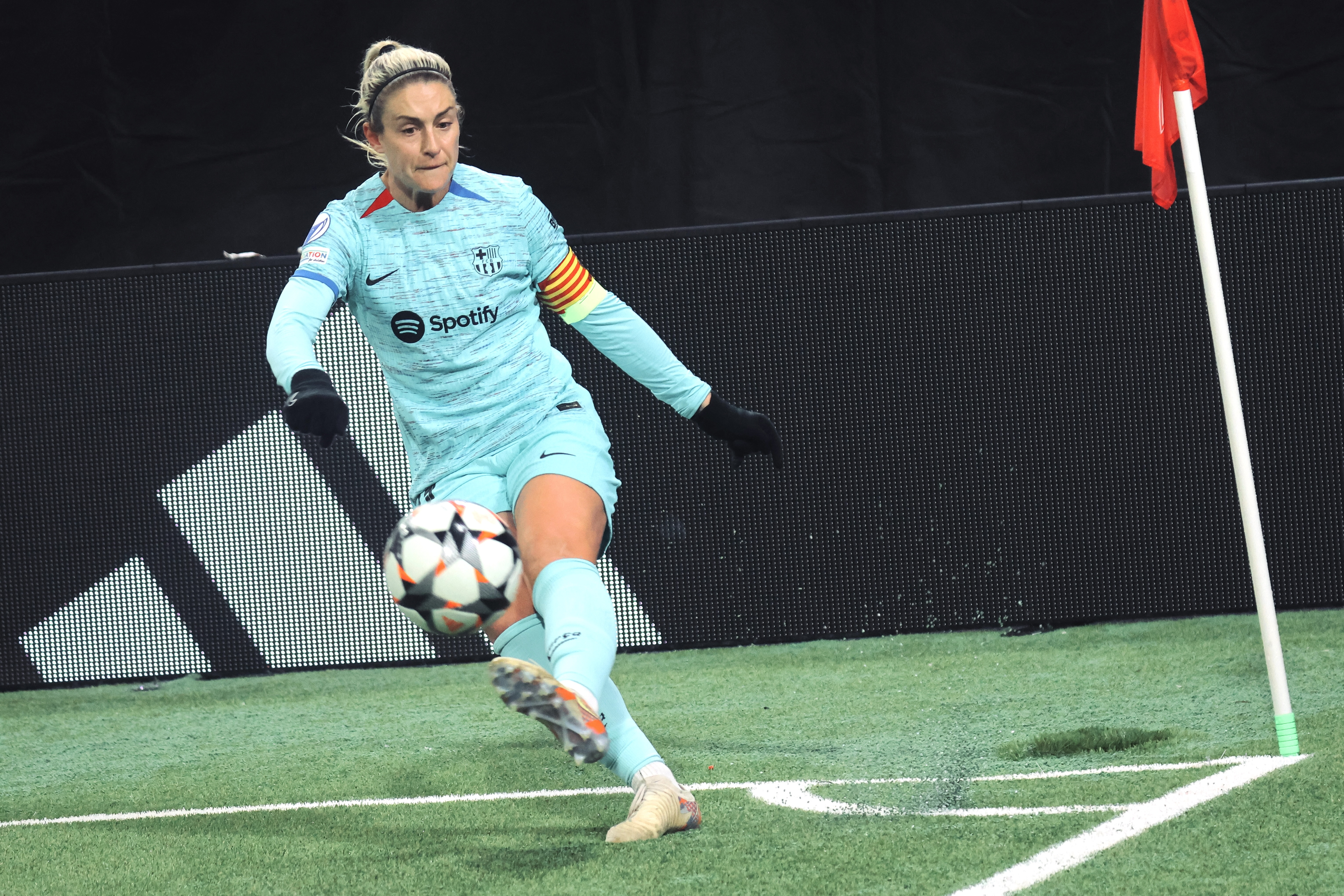
Alexia Putellas taking a corner kick for Barcelona in March 2024. A versatile midfielder, she is capable of playing as a winger, as an attacking midfielder, or even as a central midfielder.

There are also some examples of more flexible advanced playmakers, such as Zinedine Zidane, Rui Costa, Kaká, Andrés Iniesta, Juan Román Riquelme, David Silva, Alexia Putellas, and Louisa Cadamuro. These players could control the tempo of the game in deeper areas of the pitch while also being able to push forward and play line-breaking through balls. Mesut Özil can be considered a classic 10 who adopted a slightly more direct approach and specialised in playing the final ball.

=== False attacking midfielder ===
The false attacking midfielder (falso trequartista, in Italian – not to be confused with trequartista or false ten) description has been used in Italian football to describe a player who is seemingly playing as an attacking midfielder in a 4–3–1–2 formation or a 4–4–2 diamond, but who eventually drops deeper into midfield, drawing opposing players out of position and creating space to be exploited by teammates making attacking runs; the false-attacking midfielder will eventually sit in a central midfield role and function as a deep-lying playmaker. The false-attacking midfielder is, therefore, usually a creative and tactically intelligent player with good vision, technique, movement, passing ability, and striking ability from a distance. They should also be a hard-working player who is able to read the game and help the team defensively. Riccardo Montolivo and Thiago Motta, among other players, were occasionally used in this role under Italy manager Cesare Prandelli, with his system essentially resembling a 4–1–3–2 formation. Wayne Rooney has been deployed in a similar role, on occasion during his time under Alex Ferguson at Manchester United; seemingly positioned as a number 10 behind the main striker, he would often drop even deeper into midfield to help his team retrieve possession and start attacks.

=== "False 10" or "central winger" ===
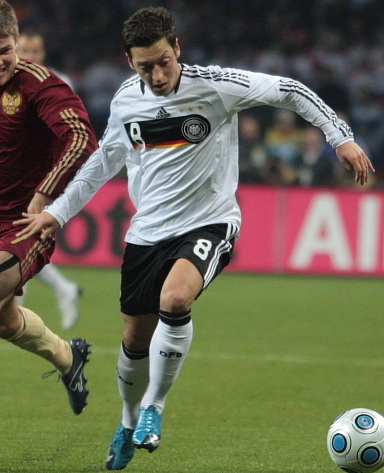
Advanced playmaker Mesut Özil was used as a false 10 with Germany.

The "false 10" or "central winger" is a type of midfielder, which differs from the trequartista. Much like the "false 9", their specificity lies in the fact that, although they seemingly play as an attacking midfielder on paper, unlike a traditional playmaker who stays behind the striker in the centre of the pitch, the false 10's goal is to move out of position and drift wide when in possession of the ball to help both the wingers and fullbacks to overload the flanks. This means two problems for the opposing midfielders: either they let the false 10 drift wide, and their presence, along with both the winger and the fullback, creates a three-on-two player advantage out wide; or they follow the false 10, but leave space in the centre of the pitch for wingers or onrushing midfielders to exploit.

False 10s are usually traditional wingers who are told to play in the centre of the pitch, and their natural way of playing makes them drift wide and look to provide deliveries into the box for teammates. On occasion, the false-10 can also function in a different manner alongside a false-9, usually in a 4–6–0 formation, disguised as either a 4–3–3 or 4–2–3–1 formation. When other forwards or false-9s drop deep and draw defenders away from the false-10s, creating space in the middle of the pitch, the false-10 will then also surprise defenders by exploiting this space and moving out of position once again, often undertaking offensive dribbling runs forward towards goal, or running on to passes from false-9s, which in turn enables them to create goalscoring opportunities or go for goal themselves.

== Winger ==

Players in the bold positions can be referred to as wingers.

In modern football, the terms winger or wide player refer to a non-defender who plays on the left or right sides of the pitch. These terms can apply to left or right forwards. Left or right-sided defenders such as wing-backs or left or right midfielders, left or right attacking midfielders, or full-backs are generally not called wingers.

In the 4-3-3 attack formation, popular in the late 19th century, wingers remained mostly near the touchlines of the pitch, and were expected to cross the ball for the team's inside and centre forwards. Traditionally, wingers were purely attacking players and were not expected to track back and defend. This began to change in the 1960s. In the 1966 World Cup, England manager Alf Ramsey did not select wingers from the quarter-final onwards. This team was known as the "Wingless Wonders" and led to the modern 4–4–2 formation.

This has led to most modern wide players having a more demanding role in the sense that they are expected to provide defensive cover for their full-backs and track back to repossess the ball, as well as provide skillful crosses for centre forwards and strikers. Some forwards can operate as wingers behind a lone striker. In a three-man midfield, specialist wingers are sometimes deployed down the flanks alongside the central midfielder or playmaker.

Even more demanding is the role of wing-back, where the wide player is expected to provide both defence and attack. As the role of winger can be classed as a forward or a midfielder, this role instead blurs the divide between defender and midfielder. Italian manager Antonio Conte has been known to use wide midfielders or wingers who act as wing-backs in his trademark 3–5–2 and 3–4–3 formations, for example; these players are expected both to push up and provide width in attack as well as track back and assist their team defensively.

On occasion, the role of a winger can also be occupied by a different type of player. For example, certain managers have been known to use a "wide target man" on the wing, namely a large and physical player who usually plays as a centre-forward, and who will attempt to win aerial challenges and hold up the ball on the flank, or drag full-backs out of position; Romelu Lukaku, for example, has been used in this role on occasion. Another example is Mario Mandžukić under manager Massimiliano Allegri at Juventus during the 2016–17 season; normally a striker, he was instead used on the left flank, and was required to win aerial duels, hold up the ball, and create space, as well as being tasked with pressing opposing players.

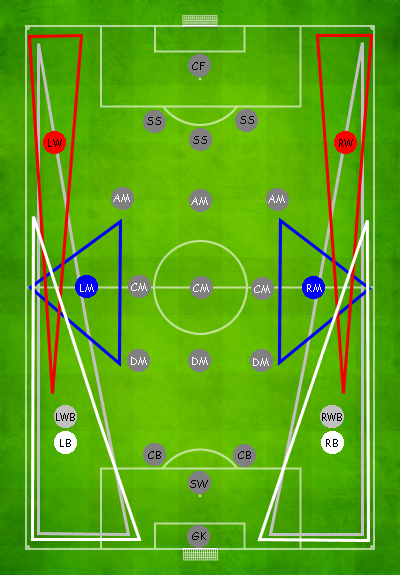
Wingers are indicated in red, while the "wide men" (who play to the flanks of the central midfielders) are indicated in blue.

Today, a winger is usually an attacking midfielder who is stationed in a wide position near the touchlines. Wingers such as Stanley Matthews or Jimmy Johnstone used to be classified as outside forwards in traditional W-shaped formations, and were formally known as "Outside Right" or "Outside Left", but as tactics evolved through the last 40 years, wingers have dropped to deeper field positions and are now usually classified as part of the midfield, usually in 4–4–2 or 4–5–1 formations (but while the team is on the attack, they tend to resemble 4–2–4/2–4–4 and 4–3–3 formations respectively).

The responsibilities of the winger include:

- Providing a "wide presence" as a passing option on the flank.
- To beat the opposing full-back either with skill or with speed.
- To read passes from the midfield that give them a clear crossing opportunity, when going wide, or that give them a clear scoring opportunity, when cutting inside towards the goal.
- To double up on the opposition winger, particularly when they are being "double-marked" by both the team's full back and winger.

The prototypical winger is fast, tricky, and enjoys 'hugging' the touchline, that is, running downfield close to the touchline and delivering crosses. However, players with different attributes can thrive on the wing as well. Some wingers prefer to cut infield (as opposed to staying wide) and pose a threat as playmakers by playing diagonal passes to forwards or taking a shot at goal. Even players who are not considered quick have been successfully fielded as wingers at the club and international level for their ability to create play from the flank. Occasionally, wingers are given a free role to roam across the front line and are relieved of defensive responsibilities. Johan Cruyff frequently exhibited this prowess, as a true model of Total Football, an ultimate "master-style" of play, in its earliest form believed to originate with the Hungary national football team - and nearly perfected - in the late 40s and early 50s.

The typical abilities of wingers include:

- Technical skill to beat a full-back in a one-to-one situation.
- Pace, to beat the full-back one-on-one.
- Crossing ability when out wide.
- Good off-the-ball ability when judging a pass from the midfield or from fellow attackers.
- Good passing ability and composure, to retain possession while in opposition territory.
- The modern winger should also be comfortable on either wing to adapt to the quick tactical changes required by the coach.

Although wingers are a familiar part of football, the use of wingers is by no means universal. Many successful football teams operate without wingers. A famous example is Carlo Ancelotti's late 2000s Milan, who typically plays in a narrow midfield diamond formation or in a Christmas tree formation (4–3–2–1), relying on full-backs to provide the necessary width down the wings.

=== Wide midfielder ===
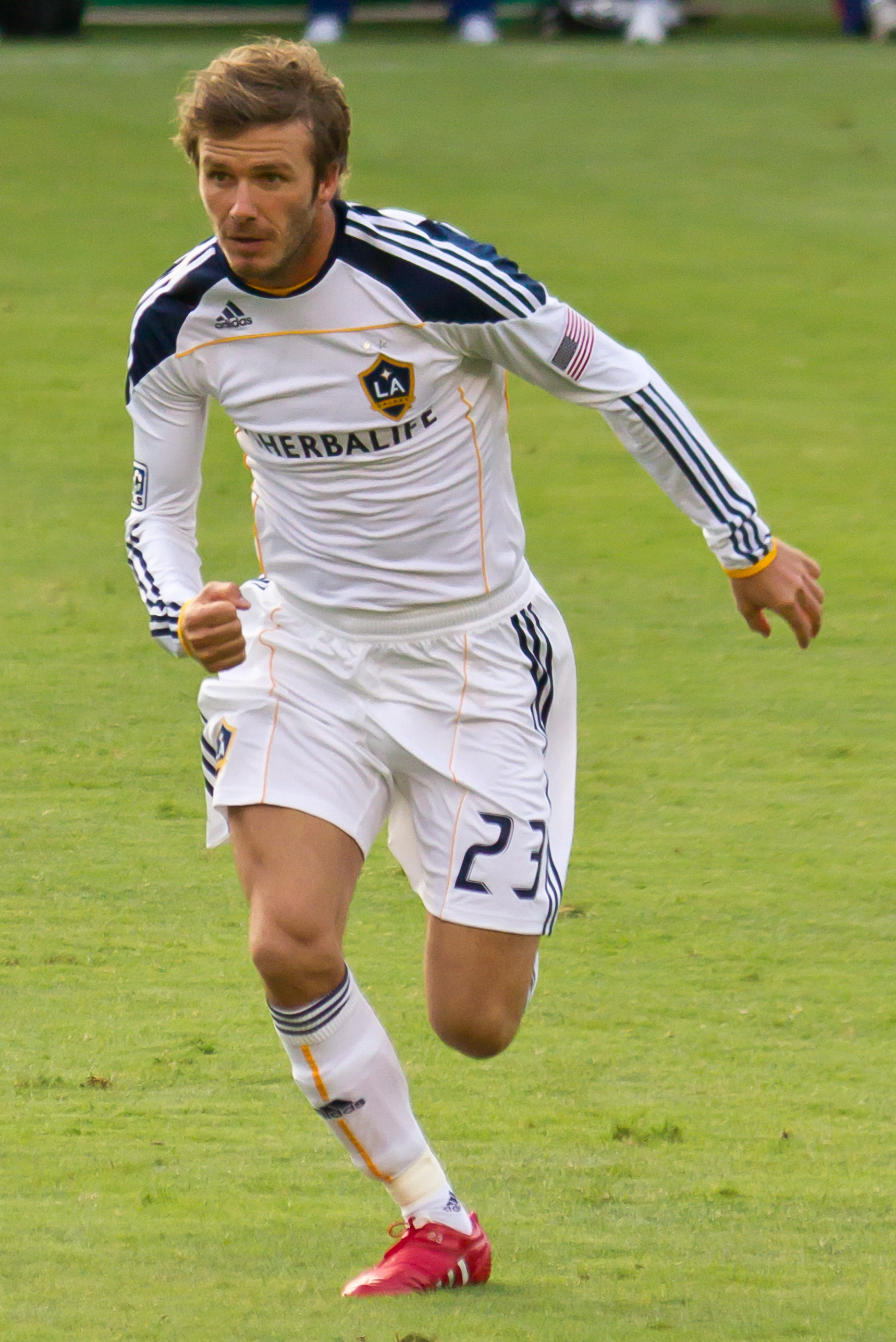
A wide midfielder, David Beckham was lauded for his range of passing, vision, crossing ability and bending free-kicks.

Left and right midfielders have a role balanced between attack and defence, while they play a lot of crosses in the box for forwards. They are positioned closer to the touchlines of the pitch. They may be asked to cross the ball into the opponent's penalty area to create scoring chances for their teammates, and when defending, they may put pressure on opponents who are trying to cross.

Common modern formations that include left and right midfielders are the 4−4−2, the 4−4−1−1, the 4–2–3–1 and the 4−5−1 formations. Jonathan Wilson describes the development of the 4−4−2 formation: "…the winger became a wide midfielder, a shuttler, somebody who might be expected to cross a ball but was also meant to put in a defensive shift." Two notable examples of wide midfielders are David Beckham and Ryan Giggs.

In Italian football, the role of the wide midfielder is known as tornante di centrocampo or simply tornante ("returning"); it originated from the role of an outside forward, and came to be known as such as it often required players in this position to track back and assist the back-line with defensive duties, in addition to aiding the midfield and attacking.

=== Wing-half ===
The historic position of wing-half (not to be confused with mezzala) was given to midfielders (half-backs) who played near the side of the pitch. It became obsolete as wide players with defensive duties have tended to become more a part of the defence as full-backs.

=== Inverted winger and raumdeuter ===
An inverted winger is a modern tactical development of the traditional winger position. Most wingers are assigned to either side of the field based on their footedness, with right-footed players on the right and left-footed players on the left. This assumes that assigning a player to their natural side ensures a more powerful cross as well as greater ball protection along the touch-lines. However, when the position is inverted, and a winger instead plays inside-out on the opposite flank (i.e., a right-footed player as a left inverted winger), they effectively become supporting strikers and primarily assume a role in the attack.

As opposed to traditionally pulling the opponent's full-back out and down the flanks before crossing the ball in near the by-line, positioning a winger on the opposite side of the field allows the player to cut-in around the 18-yard box, either threading passes between defenders or shooting on goal using the dominant foot. This offensive tactic has found popularity in the modern game due to the fact that it gives traditional wingers increased mobility as playmakers and goalscorers, such as the left-footed right winger Domenico Berardi of Sassuolo who achieved 30 career goals faster than any player in the past half-century of Serie A football. Not only are inverted wingers able to push full-backs onto their weak sides, but they are also able to spread and force the other team to defend deeper as forwards and wing-backs route towards the goal, ultimately creating more scoring opportunities.

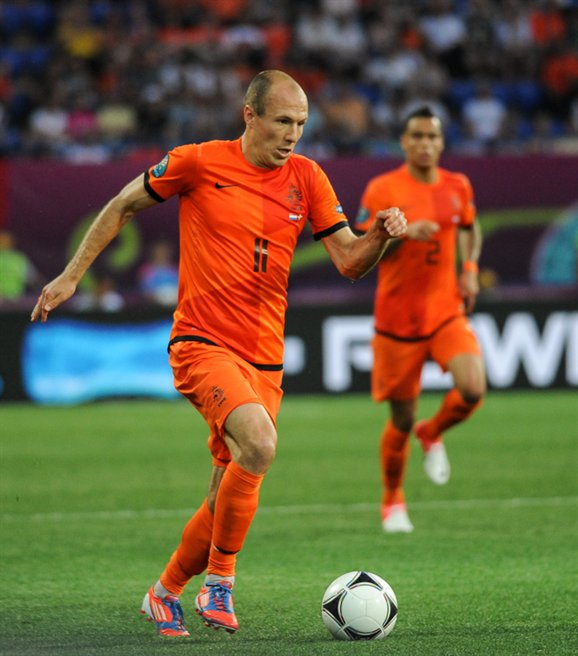
Although naturally left-footed Arjen Robben (left, 11) has often been deployed as an inverted winger on the right flank throughout his career.

Other midfielders within this tactical archetype include Lionel Messi and Eden Hazard, as well as Megan Rapinoe of the USWNT. Clubs such as Real Madrid often choose to play their wingers on the "wrong" flank for this reason; former Real Madrid coach José Mourinho often played Ángel Di María on the right and Cristiano Ronaldo on the left. Former Bayern Munich manager Jupp Heynckes often played the left-footed Arjen Robben on the right and the right-footed Franck Ribéry on the left. One of the foremost practitioners of playing from either flank was German winger Jürgen Grabowski, whose flexibility helped Germany to third place in the 1970 World Cup, and the world title in 1974.

A description that has been used in the media to label a variation upon the inverted winger position is that of an "attacking", "false", or "goalscoring winger", as exemplified by Cristiano Ronaldo's role on the left flank during his time at Real Madrid in particular. This label has been used to describe an offensive-minded inverted winger, who will seemingly operate out wide on paper, but who instead will be given the freedom to make unmarked runs into more advanced central areas inside the penalty area to get on the end of passes and crosses and score goals, effectively functioning as a striker.

This role is somewhat comparable to what is known as the raumdeuter role in German football jargon (literally "space interpreter"), as exemplified by Thomas Müller, as well as Dele Alli and Tim Cahill, namely an attacking-minded wide player, who will move into effective central attacking areas to find spaces from which they can receive passes and score or assist goals, while other teammates create space for their runs by drawing opponents away from them.

=== False winger ===
The "false winger" or "seven-and-a-half" is a label which has been used to describe a type of player who normally plays centrally, but who instead is deployed out wide on paper; during the course of a match, however, they will move inside and operate in the centre of the pitch to drag defenders out of position, congest the midfield and give their team a numerical advantage in this area, so that they can dominate possession in the middle of the pitch and create chances for the forwards; this position also leaves space for full-backs to make overlapping attacking runs up the flank. Samir Nasri, who has been deployed in this role, once described it as that of a "non-axial playmaker".

== See also ==
- Association football positions
- Association football tactics
- Defender
- Forward
- Goalkeeper
