= Assist (ice hockey) =

Point awarded to players whose passes enabled a goal

In this diagram, the blue player on the right would be credited with an assist, while the blue player on the left would score the goal.

In ice hockey, an assist is attributed to up to two players of the scoring team who shot, passed or deflected the puck towards the scoring teammate, or touched it in any other way which enabled the goal, meaning that they were "assisting" in the goal. There can be a maximum of two assists per goal. The assists will be awarded in the order of play, with the last player to pass the puck to the goal scorer getting the primary assist and the player who passed it to the primary assister getting the secondary assist. Players who gain an assist will get one point added to their player statistics. When a player scores a goal or is awarded a primary or secondary assist, they will be given a point. The leader of total points throughout an NHL season will be awarded the Art Ross trophy.

Despite the use of the terms "primary assist" and "secondary assist", neither is worth more than the other, and neither is worth more or less than a goal. An assist is awarded to the player or players (maximum of two) who touched the puck prior to the goal, provided no defender plays or possesses the puck in between. Assists and goals are added together on a player's scoresheet to display that player's total points.

Although there are different rulebooks present for all countries that participate in the national level, the awarding of an assist point is universal. Based on the Hockey Canada rulebook, Rule 6.6 Goals and Assists Hockey Canada; "Each goal and assist will count one point in the scoring records. A maximum of two assists will be credited on any one goal." There are also specifics that must be considered on certain assist points, such as assists on rebound shots. According to the USA Hockey Officiating Rulebook, A1 shoots the puck which hits the goalkeeper and rebounds out to teammate A2. A2 then shoots the puck into the goal. Does the player who took the initial shot (A1) deserve an assist? Yes. Rule Reference 617(a). In the case of a rebound, only one assist can be given to the player who took the original shot.

== Special cases ==
If a player scores off a rebound given up by a goaltender, assists are still awarded, as long as there is no re-possession by that goaltender i.e. they did not gain complete control of the puck.

However, a rule says that only one point can be credited to any one player on a goal scored. This means one player cannot be credited with a goal and an assist for the same goal scored; instead the player would only get credit for a goal and a different player may get credit for an assist, if applicable. It also means that one player cannot be credited with two assists for the same goal scored; instead the player would only get credit for one assist and a different player may get credit for the other assist, if applicable.

Additionally, if a player passes the puck to another player who then completes a give-and-go with a different player for a goal, the player who made the pass that set up the goal gets the primary assist, and the player who passed to the eventual goal scorer before the give-and-go took place gets the secondary assist. This is essentially because assists are to be awarded to the last (up to) two players of the scoring team who had possession of the puck before the eventual goal scorer had possession and ultimately scored, regardless of whether that eventual goal scorer had possession at any time in between the two other players. This also means that possession of the puck can go from and in between the eventual goal scorer and eventual assist getters an unlimited number of times, and this scoring standard will still be applied.

== See also ==
- List of NHL career assists leaders
- Assist (disambiguation)
- One timer
