= Shooting (association football) =

Kicking technique in association football

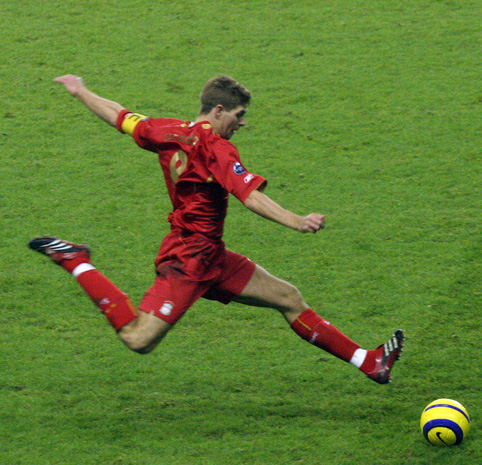
Liverpool former captain and icon Steven Gerrard preparing to shoot the ball

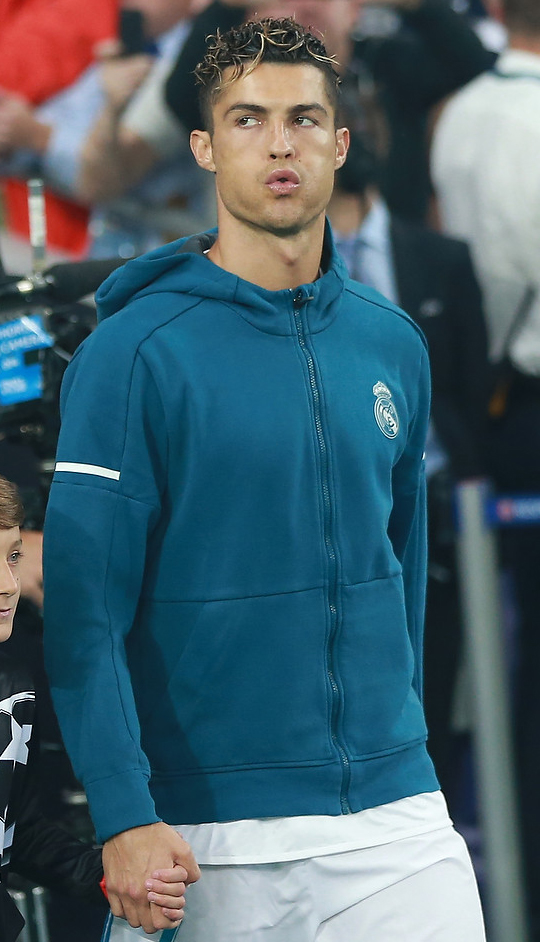
Football's All time top scorer Cristiano Ronaldo while playing for Real Madrid in 2017

In association football, shooting is the act of striking the ball in an attempt to score a goal. Shooting is a core attacking skill and may occur in open play, from set pieces, or during a penalty kick. A shot is typically taken using the feet, though players may also shoot using the head (a header), particularly when finishing crosses or aerial passes.

A shot on target (also called a shot on goal) is a shot that enters the goal, or would have entered the goal if it had not been saved by the goalkeeper or blocked by another defensive player.

== Types of shooting ==
Shooting techniques in association football are commonly categorised according to the part of the body used to strike the ball, the intended movement of the ball in flight, and the state of the ball at the moment it is struck.

=== By striking surface / body part ===
- Instep drive (laces shot): A power-oriented shot struck with the instep of the foot (the area commonly referred to as the laces). This technique is frequently used for long-range shots and attempts requiring high ball speed.
- Inside-of-the-foot shot (placed shot): A controlled shot struck with the inside of the foot, typically used to prioritise accuracy and placement over maximum power.
- Outside-of-the-foot shot (including trivela): A shot struck with the outside of the foot, often used to disguise direction or to generate swerve and curved ball flight.
- Header: A shot executed using the head, commonly used to finish crosses, corners and other aerial deliveries.

=== By ball movement and spin ===
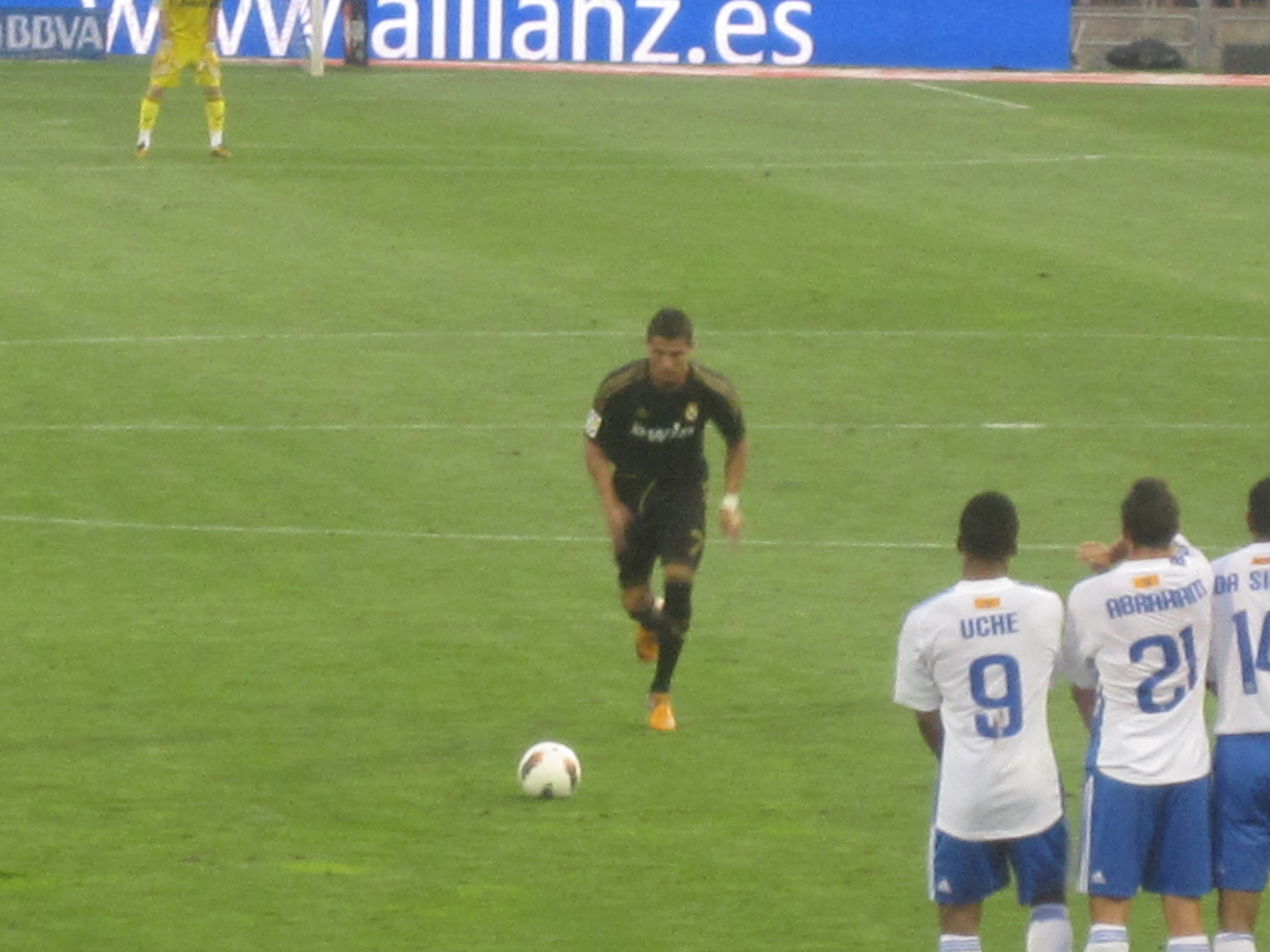
A player taking a direct free kick; free kicks are often struck using curl or minimal-spin techniques.

- Curled / bending shot (curl): A shot struck to impart sidespin so that the ball curves in flight. Curled shots are commonly used to bypass defenders or to target the far corner of the goal.
- Knuckleball shot: A shot struck with minimal spin, producing an erratic or unpredictable flight path. This technique is commonly associated with direct free kicks taken from distance.

=== By ball state (timing) ===
- Volley: A shot taken while the ball is airborne, before it touches the ground.
- Half-volley: A shot taken immediately after the ball bounces, often requiring precise timing and technique.

=== Situational and specialised shots ===
- Chip shot (lob): A shot struck to lift the ball in a high arc over the goalkeeper or defensive line and into the goal. The technique relies on finesse and accurate judgement of the goalkeeper’s position.
- Toe poke (toe shot): A quick shot struck with the toe of the boot, typically used in close-range situations due to the short backswing and reduced ability for defenders and goalkeepers to anticipate the strike.
- Backheel shot: A shot executed using the heel, typically improvised when the player’s body orientation makes a conventional strike difficult.

=== Penalty techniques ===
- Penalty kick: A direct shot taken from the penalty mark following a foul in the penalty area.
- Panenka: A penalty technique involving a softly chipped shot played down the centre of the goal as the goalkeeper dives to one side.

=== Acrobatic and trick shots ===
- Bicycle kick (overhead kick): An acrobatic airborne strike in which the player kicks the ball backward over their head.
- Rabona: A technique in which the kicking leg is wrapped behind the standing leg to strike the ball.
- Scorpion kick: A rare improvised strike executed by flicking the ball forward with the heels while diving or leaning forward.

== See also ==
- Passing (association football)
- Free kick (association football)
- Penalty kick (association football)
