= Sascha Lenhart =

German footballer

Personal information
- Full name: Sascha David Lenhart
- Date of birth: 16 December 1973 (age 52)
- Place of birth: Cologne, West Germany
- Height: 1.73 m (5 ft 8 in)
- Position: Midfielder

Youth career
- TSC Euskirchen
- 1. FC Köln

Senior career*
Years	Team	Apps	(Gls)
1992–1995	1. FC Köln II		
1995–1996	FC Antwerp	10	(0)
1996–1998	Leicester City	0	(0)
1998–1999	Wuppertaler SV		
1999–2001	Rot-Weiß Oberhausen		
2001–2002	MSV Duisburg II		
2004–2005	Germania Teveren		
2005–2006	TuRu Düsseldorf		
2006–2007	GFC Düren	28	(1)

International career
1992–1993	Germany U20	7	(0)
- * Club domestic league appearances and goals

Sascha David Lenhart (born 16 December 1973) is a German former professional footballer who played as a midfielder.

== Career ==
Lenhart began his career as a German youth international, being part of the Germany U20 national team in the 1993 FIFA World Youth Championship, coming on as a substitute in a 2–1 defeat to Uruguay U20 and made ten appearances in the Belgian First Division.

Lenhart joined Leicester City in 1996 on a month-long contract after impressing Martin O'Neill during his trial with the club, playing in two reserve games. In September 1996, he came on as a substitute for Jamie Lawrence in a 2–1 win over Scarborough in the Coca-Cola Cup 2nd round, second leg after Lawrence suffered a head injury after scoring Leicester's first goal. It was his only Leicester appearance which led to his release by the club despite returning from Germany after recuperation.

In 1999, he made two appearances for Rot-Weiß Oberhausen in the 2. Bundesliga.
