= Push and run =

Tactic and skill in association football

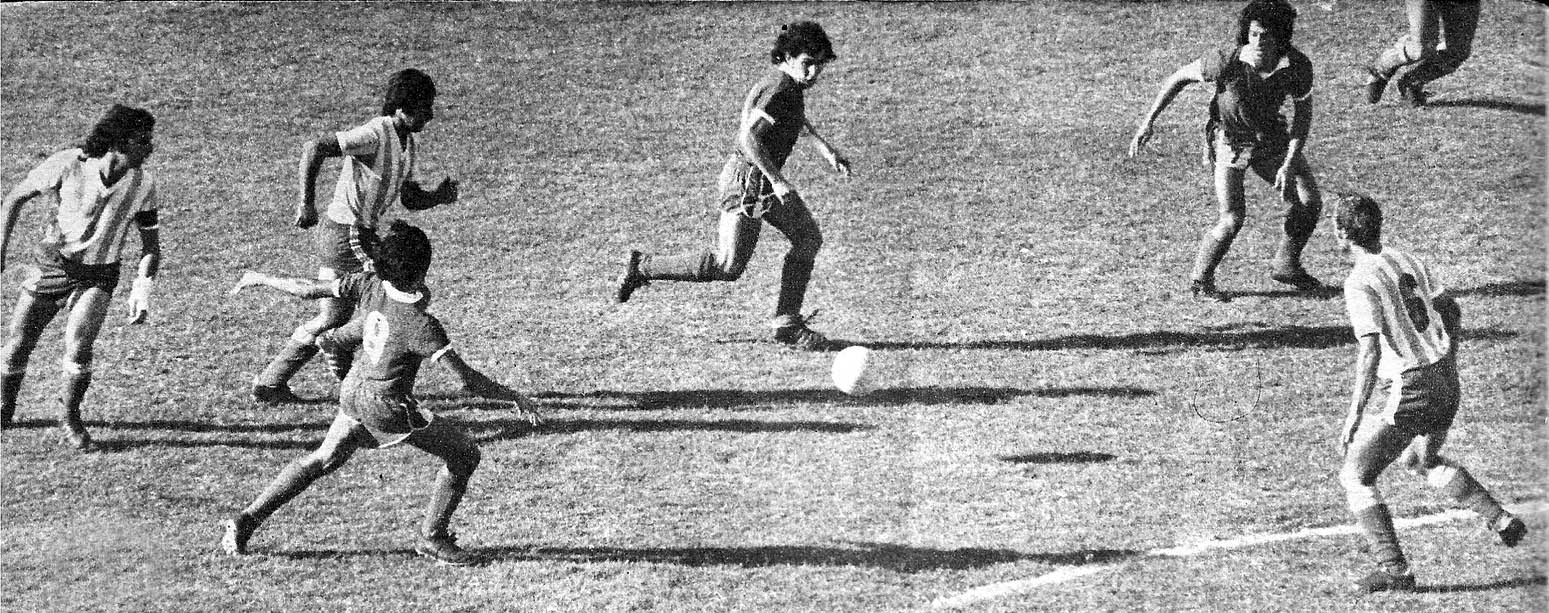
a "give-and-go" play between Ricardo Ruiz Moreno and Ricardo Bochini of Independiente in a match v Racing in 1974

Push-and-run, also known as a wall pass, a one-two or a give-and-go (Spanish: pared), is a tactic and skill often used in association football. It involves quickly laying the ball off to a teammate and running past the marking tackler to collect the return pass. It proved an effective way to move the ball at pace, with players' positions and responsibility being fluid.

It was devised and developed by Arthur Rowe, who was the then manager of English football club Tottenham Hotspur from 1949. Implementing this new and unique style, Tottenham ran away with their first league title. In 1951 they won the First Division Championship and became the third side to win Second and First Divisions in successive seasons – after Liverpool in 1906 and Everton in 1932.

== Origin ==
The "push and run" style of play was first developed by Arthur Rowe at Tottenham Hotspur. Rowe himself would credit Peter McWilliam, the Spurs manager under whom he served, with teaching him how to play a quick passing style of game from which Rowe then extended into "push and run". This possession-based game of play of McWilliam has been traced back to Scottish players who first conceived of the idea of keeping possession of the ball instead of dribbling and charging in their first ever football international against England in 1872.

Aside from Rowe, McWilliam also taught other Spurs players such as Bill Nicholson and Vic Buckingham such possession-based passing game. Buckingham would then pass on this pass-and-move style of play when he went on to manage Barcelona and Ajax, where it would influence the development of Total Football.

== See also ==
- Combination Game
- Give-and-go
- Passing (association football)
- Alley-oop
