= Julian Watts =

English footballer (born 1971)

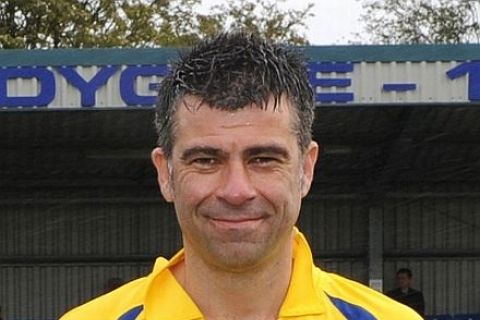

Personal information
- Full name: Julian Watts
- Date of birth: 17 March 1971 (age 55)
- Place of birth: Sheffield, England
- Height: 6 ft 3 in (1.91 m)
- Position: Defender

Youth career
- Rotherham United

Senior career*
Years	Team	Apps	(Gls)
1990–1992	Rotherham United	20	(1)
1992–1996	Sheffield Wednesday	18	(1)
1992	→ Shrewsbury Town (loan)	9	(0)
1996–1998	Leicester City	38	(1)
1997	→ Crewe Alexandra (loan)	5	(0)
1998	→ Huddersfield Town (loan)	8	(0)
1998–1999	Bristol City	17	(1)
1998–1999	→ Lincoln City (loan)	2	(0)
1999	→ Blackpool (loan)	9	(0)
1999	→ Luton Town (loan)	6	(0)
1999–2001	Luton Town	67	(8)
2001–2004	Northern Spirit	66	(2)
2016	Rainworth Miners Welfare	1	(0)
Total		266	(14)

Managerial career
- 2011–2013: Hallam
- 2013–201?: Shirebrook Town
- 2015–2017: Rainworth Miners Welfare
- * Club domestic league appearances and goals

Julian Watts (born 17 March 1971) is an English football manager and former professional footballer. He is currently the reserve team manager at Worksop Town.

He played as a defender most notably in the Premier League for both Sheffield Wednesday and Leicester City. He also played in the Football League for Rotherham United, Shrewsbury Town, Crewe Alexandra, Huddersfield Town, Bristol City, Lincoln City and Blackpool. However his final two clubs saw him pick up more club appearances for any other team he played for with a five year spell at Luton Town followed by a spell in Australia for Northern Spirit, He has since moved into management and has managed Hallam, Shirebrook Town and later Rainworth Miners Welfare.

== Playing career ==
Watts started out with Rotherham United as an apprentice, but after only two years in the first team he moved on to Sheffield Wednesday. He left Sheffield Wednesday in March 1996, after only 18 league appearances, to play for Leicester City. At Leicester he played as they won the 1996 First Division play-off final. He also contributed to their run in the 1996–97 Football League Cup, being on the pitch as they beat Wimbledon in the semi-final, but was left out of the final squad itself. Whilst at Leicester he scored once; his goal coming in a 3–1 defeat to Chelsea. Watts wore the colours of five more teams before he arrived at Luton Town on loan in 1999. Luton clearly suited Watts, as he became a first team regular, and made 67 league appearances in two seasons. At the end of 2000–01, he decided to join Australian club Northern Spirit, where he played until 2004, when the club folded. Now retired from the game, he returned to England to set up a business in Worksop. In September 2010 he was appointed assistant manager of Maltby Main and in January 2011 manager of Hallam.

== Managerial career ==
On 3 May 2016 Watts, now manager of Nottinghamshire side Rainworth Miners Welfare, was obliged to play once again for a fixture on the final day of the season against Pickering Town; his club were struggling to get a team together due to injuries, work commitments and a youth team cup final. Watts played 54 minutes before replacing himself with substitute Cameron Mitchell. Rainworth lost 4–2. In July 2024, he was appointed reserve team manager at Worksop Town.

== Honours ==
Leicester City

- Football League First Division play-offs: 1996
