= Jamie Squires =

English footballer

Personal information
- Full name: James Alexander Squires
- Date of birth: 15 November 1975 (age 50)
- Place of birth: Preston, England
- Position: Defender

Senior career*
Years	Team	Apps	(Gls)
1994–1998	Preston North End	31	(0)
1997	→ Mansfield Town (loan)	1	(0)
1998	→ Dunfermline Athletic (loan)	5	(0)
1998–2000	Dunfermline Athletic	21	(2)
2000–2001	Carlisle United	5	(0)
2001–2002	Doncaster Rovers	30	(2)
2002–2003	Nuneaton Borough	19	(2)
2003–2004	Bamber Bridge	-	(-)
2004–2005	Chorley	-	(-)
2005–	Bamber Bridge	-	(-)
- * Club domestic league appearances and goals

James Alexander Squires (born 15 November 1975 in Preston) is an English footballer.
