= Passing (association football) =

Ball technique in association football

Passing the ball is a key part of association football. The purpose of passing is to keep possession of the ball by maneuvering it on the ground between different players with the objective of advancing it up the playing field.

Passing brings an advantage in that the team secures possession of the ball, without allowing the opposition an opportunity to attack. The skill of dribbling the ball is seen much less in modern football matches than in the first half of the twentieth century. This observation is often noted with regret by fans of the game who were familiar with older styles.

Pass success depends on two factors: The first factor is the skill of the passer to accurately weigh and aim the pass in the direction of the intended receiver. The second factor is the ability for the pass receiver to accurately weigh, time and direct the reception of the pass, so as to set the premise for the continuation of play.

== Types of passing ==
=== Short passing ===
A short pass is when a person passes the ball a short distance to another player. It is used in many instances to create an attack or to build up a play .

=== Long passing ===
The aim of a long pass is to switch players or find a teammate in space. A long pass is generally more attacking than a short pass, but this can depend on where the player is located on the field. If the player wants to drive his pass, he should approach the ball at a 30-degree angle so there is room to swing his kicking leg through. The player uses his arms for balance, positions his non-kicking foot close to the side of the ball, and keeps his eyes on the ball.

=== Wall passing ===
A wall pass (also known as a "give-and-go" or a "one-two") is when a player passes the ball to an open teammate and that teammate passes the ball back to him around the defender. This type of pass requires precise timing because if executed incorrectly, it can break down an attack.

=== Through pass ===
A through-ball is a pass into open space between two defenders for an attacker to receive the ball behind the defenders. It is usually used to run in behind the defenders and also to create goal-scoring opportunities

== History of ball passing in football ==
=== Early history of ball passing in football ===
In 1581 Richard Mulcaster is the first to describe "foteball" teams consisting of players using different positions ("standings"), although passing is not stated explicitly. The first specific reference to player to player passing ("dealing") in football-like ball of Cornish hurling.

There are two other early allusions to passing the ball, but in each it is more likely that the ball is being kicked between members of opposing teams. David Wedderburn in 1633 suggests that his students might want to use the Latin words literally meaning "strike (percute) it here" and "strike it again (or back)". Similarly, in 1650 English puritan Richard Baxter in his book Everlasting Rest: "like a Football in the midst of a crowd of Boys, tost about in contention from one to another". This is also alluded to in a poem of c1624 by Edmund Waller referring to a football team working together towards "victory": "a sort [i.e. company] of lusty shepherds try their force at football, care of victory... They ply their feet, and still the restless ball, Toss'd to and fro, is urged by them all." The last line suggests that playing as a team emerged much earlier in English football than previously thought.

The next definite description of team players passing the ball to each other comes in 1823 in Suffolk. In this Moor describes a team ball game with goals in which a player who can not advance further "throws the ball [he must in no case give it] to some less beleaguered friend more free and more in breath than himself". Although this description refers to throwing, Moor tells us that the game was at other times a football one: "Sometimes a large football was used; the game was then called 'kicking camp'."

=== The public schools of England (early 19th century) and the Cambridge Rules ===
The public schools of England had developed their own forms of football since at least the Fifteenth century and these were subsequently very influential in the formulation of the 1863 first first-ever rules of modern Association Football by the Football Association. Many English public school football games involved dribbling and players were often very skillful at this art. Passing was certainly part of some games, as can be seen in the game of rugby football. The value of passing the ball in these various games depended upon the offside rule in that particular code. Some public school games kept a very tight offside rule, thus making forward passing worthless. Some rules, however, allowed for forward passing so long as there were more than 3 opposition players behind the ball. This rule permitted the positioning of players ahead of the ball. Such passing was called "passing on" and some players became deft at spying gaps to move the ball forward to teammates. This is noteworthy for marking the origins of forward passing. The earliest evidence of an offside rule resembling modern rules and permitting the forward pass comes in 1847 from Eton College: This stated that "A player is considered 'sneaking' [an old, and probably more logical, word for being offside] when only three or less than three of the opposite side are before him and the ball behind him, and in such a case, he may not kick the ball." Similarly, the Cambridge Rules of 1856 (and probably earlier versions) permitted such passing on.

The adoption at Cambridge of a loose offside rule marks the beginning of a split into two football games: one a more physical, handling game with a tight offside law (Rugby Football) and the other involving less handling and physical contact with a loose offside law (Association football from 1863). Such rules permitting the forward pass opened the door to more complex combination of passes.

In 1856 Lancing College created its own code of football which was regarded as a means of fostering teamwork.

During FA meetings to discuss the development of the rules of soccer before 1867 there is evidence that representatives of Charterhouse and Westminster School (whose football games did not involve handling) were advocates of the forward pass. As a result of these schools' enthusiasm for a "loose" offside rule, forward passing was not forbidden under the subsequent versions of the FA's rules and the original Cambridge rules offside rule was introduced to the FA rules in 1867.

=== Modern history ===
The earliest reference in English to "passing" of the ball occurs in the early 1860s. The original Football Association rules of 1863 state that, "A player shall not be allowed to throw the ball or pass it to another with his hands". It is clear that at this time players were familiar with the concept of passing the ball to each other with their feet. The direction of the pass was not regulated in the early rules of the Football Association.

"Scientific" football is first recorded in 1839 from Lancashire and in the modern game from Sheffield FC as early as 1865. The earliest contemporary reference to ball passing in soccer comes from 1870 from the Royal Engineers AFC. For example, a contemporary match report clearly shows that by 1870, ball passing was a feature of the Engineers style: "Lieut. Creswell, who having brought it up the side then kicked it into the middle to another of his side, who kicked it through the posts the minute before time was called" Passing is reported from Sheffield FC from at least January 1872. For example, In January 1872 the following account is given against Derby: "W. Orton, by a specimen of careful play, running the ball up in close proximity to the goal, from which it was returned to J. Marsh, who by a fine straight shot kicked it through" This play taking place "in close proximity to the goal" suggests a short pass and the "return" of the ball to Marsh suggests that this was the second of two passes. A double pass is first reported from Derby school against Nottingham Forest in March 1872, the first of which is irrefutably a short pass: "Mr Absey dribbling the ball half the length of the field delivered it to Wallis, who kicking it cleverly in front of the goal, sent it to the captain who drove it at once between the Nottingham posts" Possibly the most important passing manoeuvre in the early history of soccer was the pass from Vidal ("the prince of the dribblers") to M. P. Betts who then scored the only goal in the first-ever FA cup final in March 1872.

The short pass was the favoured style of Queens Park FC during the 1870s, although the club's original offside rule (August 1867) suggests that forward passing was part of their game at this early stage. Short passing (amongst the forwards), and long passing (from the backs), appears to have been used by Queen's Park in their FA Cup tie against Wanderers FC in March 1872,

They dribble little and usually convey the ball by a series of long kicks, combined with a judicious plan of passing on.

The first evidence of passing as a collective team based game (as opposed to sporadic references to passing in games, or references to the 'backing up' game) can be found in the first official international match between Scotland and England (30 November 1872). The Graphic, a London-based weekly newspaper, specifically states,

Individual skill was generally on England's side, the dribbling of Kirke Smith, Brockbank, and Ottaway being very fine, while Welch, half-back, showed himself a safe and good kick. The Southrons, however, did not play to each other so well as their opponents, who seem to be adepts in passing the ball.

The first side who are attributed to perfecting the modern formation (2-3-5) was Cambridge University AFC in 1882, although significantly the 2-3-5 formation was being played by other clubs in Scotland and England by 1880, and can be found in Wales as early as 1878.

== See also ==
- Cross (football)
- Curl (football)
- Magnus effect
- Assist (football)
- Long ball
