= Leif Anderson =

Swedish jazz radio presenter (1925–1999)

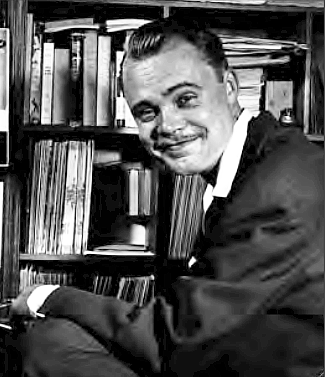
- Born: February 11, 1925; Malmö, Sweden
- Died: 17 November 1999 (aged 74); Malmö, Sweden
- Other name: Smoke Rings
- Occupations: Journalist, radio host, jazz expert

Leif Anderson (11 February 1925 – 17 November 1999), often known by the sobriquet Smoke Rings, was a Swedish jazz expert, journalist and radio personality. His radio show Smoke Rings – Swing och sweet med Leif Anderson was first broadcast on Sveriges Radio on 12 September 1960. The last programme was broadcast on 14 November 1999, a few days before Anderson's death; this was the 1,786th programme in the series, which thereby became the longest-running show in Swedish radio history.

Anderson had a characteristically hoarse voice, and in his radio programme he spoke a mixture of Swedish with a Scanian accent and English. He specialised in jazz music from the 1920s, 1930s and 1940s.
