= Curl (association football) =

In association football (soccer), spin on the ball which will make it change direction

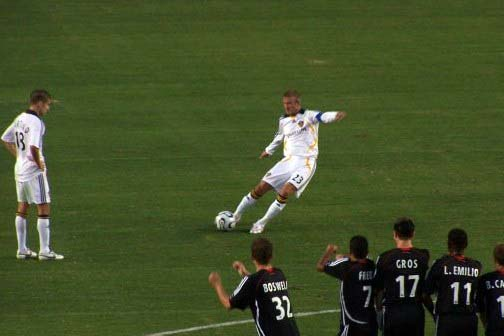
David Beckham (centre) scoring with a bending free kick in 2007. The ball is struck with the inside of his right foot, with his body leaning to the left to generate extra curl on the ball.

Curl or bend in association football is a definition for a spin on the ball which makes the ball move in a curved direction. When kicking the ball, the inside of the foot is often used to curl the ball, but this can also be done by using the outside of the foot. Similar to curl, the ball can also swerve in the air, without the spin on the ball which makes the ball curl.

Curling or bending the ball is especially used in free kicks, shots from outside the penalty area and crosses. Differences between balls can affect the amount of swerve and curl: traditional leather footballs were too heavy to curl without great effort, whereas lighter modern footballs curl more easily.

== Nomenclature ==
The deviation of a ball from the straight path in the air is known as the curl, or swerve; however, the spin on the ball that causes this is also known as the curl. Shots that curl, bend, or swerve are known as curlers, or in extreme cases, banana shots. The technique of putting curl on a ball with the outside of the foot is sometimes known as a trivela, a Portuguese term, with Ricardo Quaresma a notable user of this skill. The topspin technique of putting straight curl (instead of side curl) on a ball is known as a dip or dipping shot. Putting no spin on the ball is often used for longer distance kicks, and can cause the ball to dip, or wobble in the air unpredictably. The 1950s Brazilian star Didi is thought to have created this technique, and used it frequently when taking free kicks, which were known as folha seca ("dry" or "dead leaf," in Portuguese) free kicks. Today it is commonly known as the knuckleball technique; this technique has also been described in the media as the "tomahawk", or even the "maledetta" ("accursed," in Italian).

== Usage ==
=== Free kicks ===
Roberto Carlos' bending free kick for Brazil (yellow) against France (blue) in 1997 was struck with the outside of his left foot.

Free kick takers often curl and put spin on the ball, to curl it over or around the wall of defending players, out of the reach of the goalkeeper. Goalkeepers usually organise walls to cover one side of the goal, and then stand themselves on the other side. Thus, the free kick taker has several choices, from curling the ball around the wall with finesse, to bending the ball around the wall using power, or even going over the wall—although this last lessens the likelihood of scoring from close range.

The 1950s Brazilian star Didi is widely believed to have invented the folha seca technique; however, Italian forward Giuseppe Meazza before him is also credited with using the technique. Today, the knuckleball technique is notably used by modern-day players such as Juninho (whose technique has often been emulated), and Cristiano Ronaldo, who would strike the ball with either no or a low amount of spin, causing it to swerve unexpectedly at a point near the goal. Gareth Bale and Andrea Pirlo are also notable proponents of this technique when taking free-kicks.

=== Corners ===
Representation of how the Magnus effect affects the ball's movement during corner kick goals

Curling can be an effective technique when taking corners. The ball gradually moves in the air towards the goal. This is referred to as an in-swinging corner. Occasionally, a corner-taker will bend the ball towards the edge of the penalty area, for an attacker to volley, or take a touch and then shoot. Rarely, a goal can be scored directly, this is called an "Olympic goal" and it requires amazing technique and a distraction of the opposing goalkeeper.

=== Passing ===
Curling can be used in passing. Effective passes from midfield to an attacking player are often the result of a curled pass around the defender, or long cross-field passes are sometimes aided by the addition of curl or backspin. This can be done with either the inside of the foot or outside of the foot. The outside of the foot may be used when a player is facing sideways and wants to use the dominant foot to make a pass; this technique is known as the trivela.

== Causes ==
The fact that spin on a football makes it curl is explained by the Magnus effect. In brief, a rotating ball creates a whirlpool of air with itself at its center. Thus, the air on one side of the ball moves in the same direction the ball is travelling in, and the air on the other side moves in the opposite direction. This creates a difference in air pressure around the ball, and it is this sustained difference in pressure which causes the course of the ball to deviate.

The Magnus effect is named after German physicist Heinrich Gustav Magnus, who described the effect in 1852. In 1672, Isaac Newton had described it and correctly inferred the cause after observing tennis players in his Cambridge college.

== Notable players ==
Many football players are renowned for their ability to curl or bend the ball when passing or shooting at goal, either from open play or a free kick. These include: Pelé, Didi, Rivellino, Zico, Diego Maradona, Michel Platini, Roberto Baggio, Alessandro Del Piero, Gianfranco Zola, Siniša Mihajlović, Zinedine Zidane, Rivaldo, David Beckham, Roberto Carlos, Juninho, Ronald Koeman, Andrea Pirlo, Ricardo Quaresma, Gareth Bale, Ronaldinho, Thierry Henry, Neymar, Kaká, Miralem Pjanić, Rogério Ceni, Shunsuke Nakamura, Pierre van Hooijdonk, Hristo Stoichkov, Thomas Murg, Luis Chávez, Carlos Vela, Cristiano Ronaldo, Luka Modrić, Giuseppe Meazza, Ángel Di María, Kevin De Bruyne, Son Heung-min and Lionel Messi, among others. (Note: See)

== See also ==
- Shooting
- Free kick
- Corner kick
- Bend It Like Beckham (2002).
- It also plays a part in the Murdoch Mysteries episode "Bend It Like Brackenreid".
