= Give-and-go =

Sports manoeuvre

A give-and-go, or one-two, is a fundamental maneuver in many team sports which involves two players passing the ball or puck back and forth. The player who has the ball or puck passes to a teammate and then repositions in order to receive a return pass and possibly create a scoring opportunity.

== Association football ==
A push and run, also known as a wall pass, or a one-two in association football is when a player passes the ball to a teammate, makes a run past a defender, and that teammate plays the ball back to him. This technique is effective to maneuver past a defender and get a clear shot at goal, but is also difficult to do and requires precise timing or risk breaking down an attacking situation.

The term wall pass comes from street football where a player would use a wall to hit the ball on and run around the defender and collect it again.

== Basketball ==
A give and go or pass and cut in basketball is when a player passes the ball to a teammate, then cuts to the basket or gets open, and receives the pass. This is an effective way to create space for a possible shot. This technique can also be an alley-oop variant if it involves a slam dunk.

== See also ==
- Push and run
- Alley-oop
