= Paul Hyde (footballer) =

English footballer

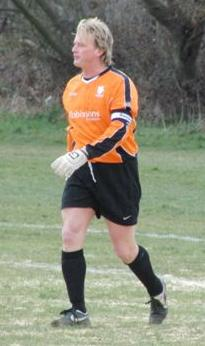
Hyde playing for Canterbury City in 2010

Paul Hyde (born 7 April 1963) is an English former professional footballer. Born in Hayes, he played professionally for Wycombe Wanderers (290 appearances), Leicester City (7 appearances in the Premier League) and Leyton Orient, where he made over 70 appearances until he had to retire due to a multiple fracture to the leg. He later returned to non-league football with Dover Athletic in the Conference league (350 appearances).

== Honours ==
Wycombe Wanderers

- Football League Third Division play-offs: 1994
- FA Trophy: 1992–93
