= Volley (association football) =

Air-borne strike in association football

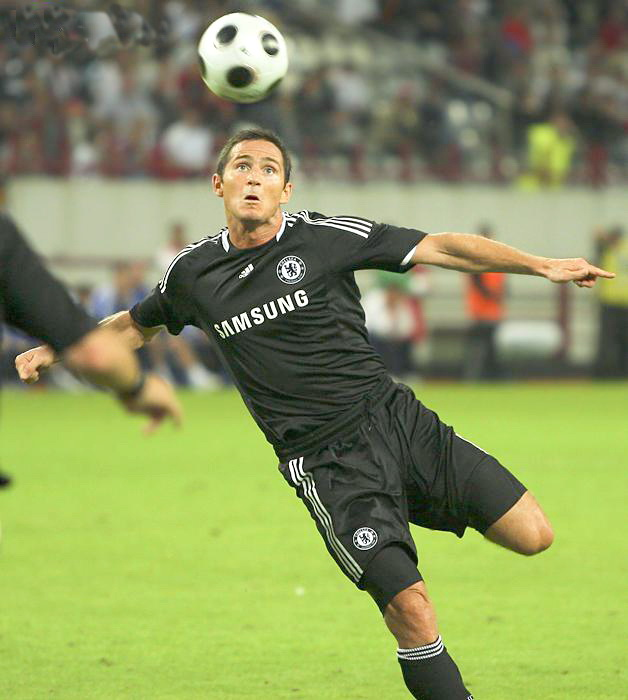
Chelsea former player and top scorer Frank Lampard preparing to execute a volley.

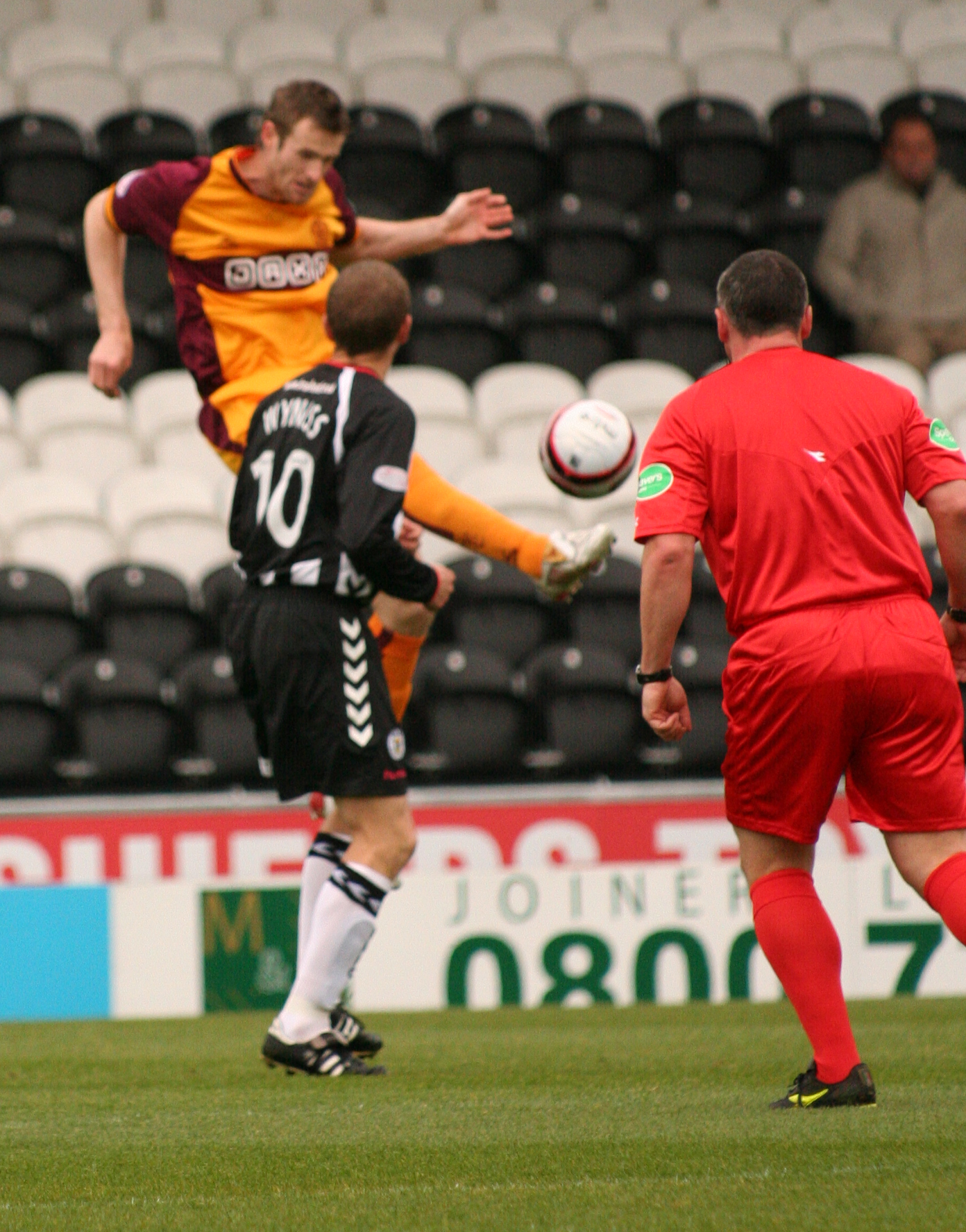
Motherwell player Brian McLean (in amber) volleys the ball in a match against St Mirren.

A volley is an air-borne strike in association football, where a player's foot meets and directs the ball in an angled direction before it has time to reach the ground. A volley can be extremely hard to aim and requires good foot-eye coordination and timing. The half volley is a similar concept, but occurs when the ball has just bounced from the ground rather than is in the air.

== Volley ==
In general, the volley requires that the player strike the ball with the front of their foot, with the toes pointing downward, ankle locked, and the knee lifted. It is important for most applications to keep the knee high over the ball when struck, and lean slightly forward to keep the shot downward. Doing so imparts a great deal of topspin and prevents the ball from flying wildly over the goal if done correctly. Because of the power and spin imparted on the ball, the shot can follow an unpredictable path to goal and prove difficult to defend against.

Used offensively, the volley can play a crucial role in scoring straight goals. Since a volley occurs when the ball is in the air, they often occur in front of goal as a result of a cross or a corner. In this instance, one attacking player passes the ball across the goal in the air, and the other player (either standing in place or in motion) strikes the ball with his foot before it hits the ground. This is advantageous over a normal strike in that the player does not need to trap the ball, taking an extra touch and allowing the goalkeeper a few extra seconds to react. Generally, the ball is struck on the laces with the toe pointing downward towards goal, though variations such as the bicycle kick or scissors kick in which the player's body moves in acrobatic fashion are occasionally employed, much to the delight of spectators.

Used defensively, the volley can quickly clear the ball from play and allow the defending team to recover their position. While less accurate and harder to execute than a normal long pass, the volley is useful for clearing balls that are bouncing towards or away from a defender because the defender does not need to trap the ball or change directions if they are running towards their own goal.

The volley is used less often for passes, as it is harder to control, though it can often be used to flick the ball on to another player. In this use, the strike is softer and more controlled than either the shot or the clearance. Also, the inside of the foot, outside, or even the heel may be used to flick the ball off of a volley. When the heel is used to volley the ball over the player's head (from back to front) it is often referred to as a "donkey kick".

== Half volley ==
The term half volley is also commonly used, which is whenever the ball is kicked right after it has bounced. A half volley may be better for situations when a volley can't be done because the ball is too high and the player wants to get a more accurate shot. An example of a half volley is Didier Drogba's goal with Chelsea against Liverpool in 2006. He controlled the ball with his chest from a long pass, then turned and took a shot with his left foot from the penalty arc that went to the bottom left corner.

== See also ==
- Bicycle kick
- Shooting
