= 1995–96 Swindon Town F.C. season =

- Chairman: Michael Spearman
- Manager: Steve McMahon
- Ground: County Ground, Swindon
- Division Two: 1st (champions)
- FA Cup: Sixth Round
- League Cup: Second Round
- FL Trophy: Second Round (South)
- Top goalscorer: League: Wayne Allison (17); All: Wayne Allison (20)
- Highest home attendance: 15,035 (vs. Southampton)
- Lowest home attendance: 6,222 (vs. Colchester United)

The 1995–96 season was Swindon Town's first season in the third tier since 1987. Alongside the Division Two league campaign, Swindon Town also competed in the FA Cup, League Cup and the Auto Windscreen Trophy.

== League One ==
=== Final league table ===
| Pos | Team | Pld | W | D | L | GF | GA | GD | Pts | Promotion or relegation |
|---|---|---|---|---|---|---|---|---|---|---|
| 1 | Swindon Town (C, P) | 46 | 25 | 17 | 4 | 71 | 34 | +37 | 92 | Promotion to the First Division |
| 2 | Oxford United (P) | 46 | 24 | 11 | 11 | 76 | 39 | +37 | 83 | Promotion to the First Division |
| 3 | Blackpool | 46 | 23 | 13 | 10 | 67 | 40 | +27 | 82 | Qualification for the Second Division play-offs |
| 4 | Notts County | 46 | 21 | 15 | 10 | 63 | 39 | +24 | 78 | Qualification for the Second Division play-offs |
| 5 | Crewe Alexandra | 46 | 22 | 7 | 17 | 77 | 60 | +17 | 73 | Qualification for the Second Division play-offs |

(C) Champions; (P) Promoted

=== Result summary ===
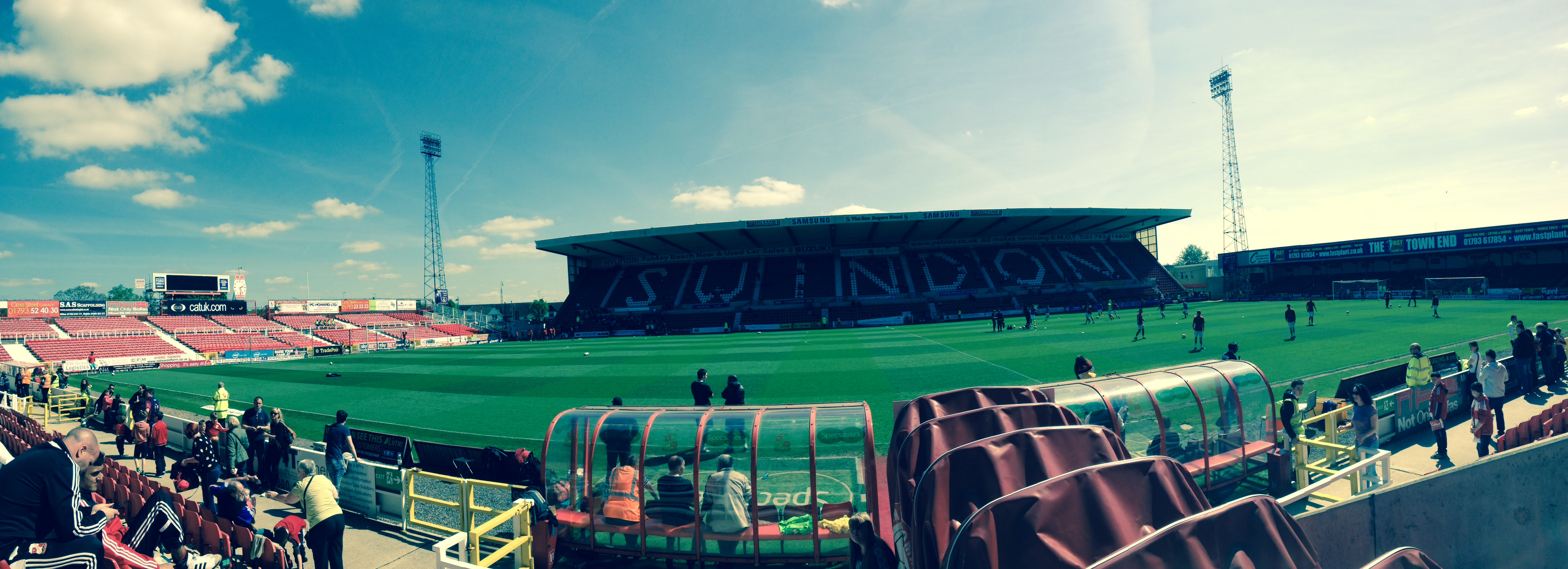
Inside the County Ground

| Round | 1 | 2 | 3 | 4 | 5 | 6 | 7 | 8 | 9 | 10 | 11 | 12 | 13 | 14 | 15 | 16 | 17 | 18 | 19 | 20 | 21 | 22 | 23 | 24 | 25 | 26 | 27 | 28 | 29 | 30 | 31 | 32 | 33 | 34 | 35 | 36 | 37 | 38 | 39 | 40 | 41 | 42 | 43 | 44 | 45 | 46 |
|---|---|---|---|---|---|---|---|---|---|---|---|---|---|---|---|---|---|---|---|---|---|---|---|---|---|---|---|---|---|---|---|---|---|---|---|---|---|---|---|---|---|---|---|---|---|---|
| Ground | A | H | A | H | A | H | H | A | H | A | H | A | H | A | A | H | A | H | A | H | A | H | H | A | H | H | A | A | H | A | A | H | A | A | H | A | H | H | A | H | H | A | A | A | A | H |
| Result | W | W | W | D | W | D | W | W | W | L | W | W | W | W | D | D | D | L | W | D | D | D | W | L | W | W | W | D | W | W | W | D | D | L | W | D | W | W | W | D | D | D | W | W | D | D |
| Position | 8 | 1 | 1 | 2 | 1 | 1 | 1 | 1 | 1 | 1 | 1 | 1 | 1 | 1 | 1 | 1 | 1 | 1 | 1 | 1 | 2 | 2 | 1 | 1 | 1 | 1 | 1 | 1 | 1 | 1 | 1 | 1 | 2 | 2 | 2 | 2 | 2 | 1 | 1 | 1 | 1 | 1 | 1 | 1 | 1 | 1 |

Source: soccerbase.com
A = Away; H = Home; W = Win; D = Draw; L = Loss

== Pre-season ==
=== Tour of Finland ===
Win Draw Loss

| v |

| July 1995 Friendly | (Scotland) Dundee United | ?–? | Swindon Town | Finland |

| July 1995 Friendly | (Finland) Nokian Pyry | 2–1 | Swindon Town | Finland |

| 29 July 1995 Friendly | (Finland) TP-Seinäjoki | ?–? | Swindon Town | Finland |

=== Domestic friendlies ===
| 2 August 1995 Friendly | Swindon Town | ?–? | Norwich City | County Ground |

| 3 August 1995 Friendly | Hayes | ?–? | Swindon Town | Church Road |

| 5 August 1995 Friendly | Hereford United | ?–? | Swindon Town | Edgar Street |

| 7 August 1995 Friendly | Witney Town | ?–? | Swindon Town | Downs Road |

== Football League Second Division ==
Win Draw Loss

League One match details
| Date | Opponent | Venue | Result F–A |
|---|---|---|---|
| 12 August 1995 | Hull City | A | 1–0 |
| 19 August 1995 | York City | H | 3–0 |
| 26 August 1995 | Carlisle United | A | 1–0 |
| 30 August 1995 | Oxford United | H | 1–1 |
| 2 September 1995 | Brentford | A | 2–0 |
| 9 September 1995 | Chesterfield | H | 1–1 |
| 13 September 1995 | Bradford City | H | 4–1 |
| 16 September 1995 | Bristol Rovers | A | 4–1 |
| 23 September 1995 | Rotherham United | H | 1–0 |
| 30 September 1995 | Wrexham | A | 3–4 |
| 7 October 1995 | Bristol City | H | 2–0 |
| 14 October 1995 | Brighton | A | 3–1 |
| 21 October 1995 | Crewe Alexandra | H | 2–1 |
| 28 October 1995 | Notts County | A | 3–1 |
| 31 October 1995 | Bournemouth | A | 0–0 |
| 4 November 1995 | Blackpool | H | 1–1 |
| 18 November 1995 | Stockport County | A | 1–1 |
| 25 November 1995 | Shrewsbury Town | H | 0–1 |
| 9 December 1995 | Rotherham United | A | 2–0 |
| 16 December 1995 | Wrexham | H | 1–1 |
| 23 December 1995 | Walsall | A | 0–0 |
| 26 December 1995 | Wycombe Wanderers | H | 0–0 |
| 10 January 1996 | Swansea City | H | 3–0 |
| 13 January 1996 | York City | A | 0–2 |
| 20 January 1996 | Hull City | H | 3–0 |
| 3 February 1996 | Carlisle United | H | 2–1 |
| 10 February 1996 | Swansea City | A | 1–0 |
| 21 February 1996 | Brentford | H | 2–2 |
| 24 February 1996 | Bristol Rovers | H | 2–1 |
| 2 March 1996 | Wycombe Wanderers | A | 2–1 |
| 5 March 1996 | Peterborough United | A | 2–0 |
| 9 March 1996 | Walsall | H | 1–1 |
| 16 March 1996 | Burnley | A | 0–0 |
| 19 March 1996 | Oxford United | A | 0–3 |
| 23 March 1996 | Peterborough United | H | 2–0 |
| 30 March 1996 | Bristol City | A | 0–0 |
| 3 April 1996 | Brighton | H | 3–2 |
| 6 April 1996 | Notts County | H | 1–0 |
| 8 April 1996 | Crewe Alexandra | A | 2–0 |
| 13 April 1996 | Bournemouth | H | 2–2 |
| 17 April 1996 | Burnley | H | 0–0 |
| 20 April 1996 | Blackpool | A | 1–1 |
| 23 April 1996 | Chesterfield | A | 3–1 |
| 27 April 1996 | Shrewsbury Town | A | 2–1 |
| 30 April 1996 | Bradford City | A | 1–1 |
| 4 May 1996 | Stockport County | H | 0–0 |

== FA Cup ==
Win Draw Loss

| 11 November 1995 FA Cup R1 | Swindon Town | 4–1 | Cambridge United | County Ground, Swindon |
| 15:00 | Horlock 41' 45'; Finney 48'; Allen 85' | Report | Butler 57' | Attendance: 7,383; Referee: Paul Alcock (Surrey) |

| 2 December 1995 FA Cup R2 | Swindon Town | 2–0 | Cardiff City | County Ground, Swindon |
| 15:00 | Allison 58'; Finney 83' | Report | | Attendance: 8,274 |

| 6 January 1996 FA Cup R3 | Swindon Town | 2–0 | Woking | County Ground, Swindon |
| 15:00 | Allison 17'; Bodin 81' | Report | | Attendance: 10,322 |

| 12 February 1996 FA Cup R4 | Swindon Town | 1–0 | Oldham Athletic | County Ground, Swindon |
| 19:45 | Ling 90' | Report | | Attendance: 9,508 |

| 17 February 1996 FA Cup R5 | Swindon Town | 1–1 | Southampton | County Ground, Swindon |
| 15:00 | Horlock 32' | Report | Watson 77' | Attendance: 15,035 |

| 28 February 1996 FA Cup R5 (R) | Southampton | 2–0 | Swindon Town | The Dell, Southampton |
| 19:45 | Oakley; Shipperley | Report | | Attendance: 13,962 |

== The League Cup ==
Win Draw Loss

| 15 August 1995 League Cup R1L1 | Cambridge United | 2–1 | Swindon Town | Abbey Stadium, Cambridge |
| 19:45 | Corazzin 11' 63' (pen.) | Report | Gooden 81' | Attendance: 2,530 |

| 23 August 1995 League Cup R1L2 | Swindon Town | 2–0 | Cambridge United | County Ground, Swindon |
| 19:45 | Beauchamp 78'; Horlock 90' | Report | Goal | Attendance: 6,724; Referee: K. Leach |

| 20 September 1995 League Cup R2L1 | Swindon Town | 2–3 | Blackburn Rovers | County Ground, Swindon |
| 19:45 | Allison 25'; Finney 26' | Report | Sutton 28'; Shearer 43' 83' | Attendance: 14,740; Referee: G. Singh |

| 4 October 1995 League Cup R2L2 | Blackburn Rovers | 2–0 | Swindon Town | Ewood Park, Blackburn |
| 19:45 | Shearer 37' 83' | Report | | Attendance: 16,924; Referee: R. Hart |

== The Football League Trophy ==
Win Draw Loss

| 17 October 1995 South (group stage) | Torquay United | 1–1 | Swindon Town | Plainmoor, Torquay |
| 19:45 | Curran 36' | Report | Ling 4' | Attendance: 1,135; Referee: C. Wilkes |

| 8 November 1995 South (group stage) | Swindon Town | 2–0 | Colchester United | County Ground, Swindon |
| 19:45 | Thorne 36'; Finney 89' | Report | | Attendance: 6,222; Referee: P. Taylor |

| 29 November 1995 South (Round 2) | Swindon Town | 0–1 | Hereford United | County Ground, Swindon |
| 19:45 | | Report | White 45' | Attendance: 6,650 |

== Appearances and goals ==
As of 13 August 2014

| No. | Pos | Nat | Player | Total | | Division 2 | | FA Cup | | League Cup | | FL Trophy | |
| No. | Pos | Nat | Player | Apps | Goals | Apps | Goals | Apps | Goals | Apps | Goals | Apps | Goals |
|---|---|---|---|---|---|---|---|---|---|---|---|---|---|
| | MF | (England) ENG | Paul Allen | 33 | 1 | 25+2 | 0 | 5+0 | 1 | 0+0 | 0 | 1+0 | 0 |
| | FW | (England) ENG | Wayne Allison | 56 | 20 | 43+1 | 17 | 6+0 | 2 | 3+0 | 1 | 3+0 | 0 |
| | MF | (England) ENG | Joey Beauchamp | 4 | 1 | 1+2 | 0 | 0+0 | 0 | 0+1 | 1 | 0+0 | 0 |
| | DF | (Wales) WAL | Paul Bodin | 42 | 3 | 32+1 | 2 | 4+0 | 1 | 4+0 | 0 | 1+0 | 0 |
| | MF | (Scotland) SCO | Lee Collins | 7 | 0 | 2+3 | 0 | 1+0 | 0 | 0+0 | 0 | 1+0 | 0 |
| | FW | (England) ENG | Steve Cowe | 11 | 1 | 4+7 | 1 | 0+0 | 0 | 0+0 | 0 | 0+0 | 0 |
| | DF | (England) ENG | Ian Culverhouse | 57 | 0 | 46+0 | 0 | 6+0 | 0 | 4+0 | 0 | 1+0 | 0 |
| | GK | (England) ENG | Fraser Digby | 36 | 0 | 25+0 | 0 | 6+0 | 0 | 4+0 | 0 | 1+0 | 0 |
| | DF | (England) ENG | Jason Drysdale | 19 | 0 | 10+3 | 0 | 2+2 | 0 | 0+0 | 0 | 2+0 | 0 |
| | FW | (England) ENG | Steve Finney | 43 | 16 | 22+8 | 12 | 2+4 | 2 | 4+0 | 1 | 2+1 | 1 |
| | GK | (Ireland) EIR | Shay Given (on loan from Blackburn Rovers) | 5 | 0 | 5+0 | 0 | 0+0 | 0 | 0+0 | 0 | 0+0 | 0 |
| | MF | (England) ENG | Ty Gooden | 35 | 4 | 14+12 | 3 | 3+1 | 0 | 1+1 | 1 | 3+0 | 0 |
| | MF | (England) ENG | Tony Grant (on loan from Everton) | 3 | 1 | 3+0 | 1 | 0+0 | 0 | 0+0 | 0 | 0+0 | 0 |
| | MF | (England) ENG | Dean Hooper | 3 | 0 | 0+0 | 0 | 0+0 | 0 | 0+1 | 0 | 2+0 | 0 |
| | MF | (Northern Ireland) NIR | Kevin Horlock | 58 | 16 | 44+1 | 12 | 6+0 | 3 | 3+1 | 1 | 1+2 | 0 |
| | MF | (Scotland) SCO | Scott Leitch (on loan from Heart of Midlothian) | 7 | 0 | 7+0 | 0 | 0+0 | 0 | 0+0 | 0 | 0+0 | 0 |
| | MF | (England) ENG | Martin Ling | 22 | 2 | 12+4 | 0 | 2+1 | 1 | 0+0 | 0 | 3+0 | 1 |
| | MF | (England) ENG | Steve McMahon | 30 | 0 | 20+1 | 0 | 3+1 | 0 | 4+0 | 0 | 0+1 | 0 |
| | GK | (England) ENG | Steve Mildenhall | 2 | 0 | 0+0 | 0 | 0+0 | 0 | 2+0 | 0 | 0+0 | 0 |
| | DF | (England) ENG | Eddie Murray | 7 | 1 | 3+2 | 1 | 0+0 | 0 | 1+0 | 0 | 1+0 | 0 |
| | DF | (Netherlands) NED | Luc Nijholt | 1 | 0 | 0+0 | 0 | 0+0 | 0 | 0+1 | 0 | 0+0 | 0 |
| | MF | (Ireland) EIR | Wayne O'Sullivan | 41 | 3 | 27+7 | 3 | 1+0 | 0 | 4+0 | 0 | 2+0 | 0 |
| | MF | (England) ENG | David Preece (on loan from Derby County) | 7 | 1 | 7+0 | 1 | 0+0 | 0 | 0+0 | 0 | 0+0 | 0 |
| | DF | (England) ENG | Mark Robinson | 58 | 1 | 46+0 | 1 | 6+0 | 0 | 3+0 | 0 | 2+1 | 0 |
| | DF | (England) ENG | Mark Seagraves | 38 | 0 | 25+3 | 0 | 3+1 | 0 | 4+0 | 0 | 2+0 | 0 |
| | MF | (England) ENG | Alex Smith | 8 | 0 | 2+6 | 0 | 0+0 | 0 | 0+0 | 0 | 0+0 | 0 |
| | GK | (Australia) AUS | Frank Talia | 16 | 0 | 16+0 | 0 | 0+0 | 0 | 0+0 | 0 | 0+0 | 0 |
| | DF | (England) ENG | Shaun Taylor | 56 | 7 | 43+0 | 7 | 6+0 | 0 | 4+0 | 0 | 3+0 | 0 |
| | DF | (England) ENG | Gary Thorne | 2 | 0 | 0+0 | 0 | 0+0 | 0 | 0+0 | 0 | 1+1 | 0 |
| | FW | (England) ENG | Peter Thorne | 34 | 11 | 22+4 | 10 | 4+1 | 0 | 1+0 | 0 | 1+1 | 1 |

== Overall summary ==
=== Summary ===
| Games played | 59 (46 Division 2, 6 FA Cup, 4 League Cup, 3 League Trophy) |
| Games won | 31 (25 Division 2, 4 FA Cup, 1 League Cup, 1 League Trophy) |
| Games drawn | 19 (17 Division 2, 1 FA Cup, 0 League Cup, 1 League Trophy) |
| Games lost | 9 (4 Division 2, 1 FA Cup, 3 League Cup, 1 League Trophy) |
| Goals scored | 89 (71 Division 2, 10 FA Cup, 5 League Cup, 3 League Trophy) |
| Goals conceded | 47 (34 Division 2, 4 FA Cup, 7 League Cup, 2 League Trophy) |
| Goal difference | +42 |
| Clean sheets | 0 (0 League One, 0 FA Cup, 0 League Cup, 0 League Trophy) |
| Yellow cards | 0 (0 League One, 0 FA Cup, 3 League Cup, 0 League Trophy) |
| Red cards | 0 (0 League One, 0 FA Cup, 0 League Cup, 0 League Trophy) |
| Worst discipline | |
| Best result | 4–1 (vs. Bradford City); 4–1 (vs. Bristol Rovers); 4–1 (vs. Cambridge United) |
| Worst result | 0–3 (vs. Oxford United |
| Most appearances | Mark Robinson and Kevin Horlock (58) |
| Top scorer | Wayne Allison (20) |
| Points | 92 |

=== Score overview ===
| Opposition | Home score | Away score | Double |
|---|---|---|---|
| Blackpool | 1–1 | 1–1 | No |
| Bournemouth | 2–2 | 0–0 | No |
| Bradford City | 4–1 | 1–1 | No |
| Brentford | 2–2 | 2–0 | No |
| Brighton & Hove Albion | 3–2 | 3–1 | Yes |
| Bristol City | 2–0 | 0–0 | No |
| Bristol Rovers | 2–1 | 4–1 | Yes |
| Burnley | 0–0 | 0–0 | No |
| Carlisle United | 2–1 | 1–0 | Yes |
| Chesterfield | 1–1 | 3–1 | No |
| Crewe Alexandra | 2–1 | 2–0 | Yes |
| Hull City | 3–0 | 1–0 | Yes |
| Notts County | 1–0 | 3–1 | Yes |
| Oxford United | 1–1 | 0–3 | No |
| Peterborough United | 2–0 | 2–0 | Yes |
| Rotherham United | 1–0 | 2–0 | Yes |
| Shrewsbury Town | 0–1 | 2–1 | No |
| Stockport County | 0–0 | 1–1 | No |
| Swansea City | 3–0 | 1–0 | Yes |
| Walsall | 1–1 | 0–0 | No |
| Wrexham | 1–1 | 3–4 | No |
| Wycombe Wanderers | 0–0 | 2–1 | No |
| York City | 3–0 | 0–2 | No |
