= 1996–97 Swindon Town F.C. season =

Swindon Town
1996–97 season
- Manager: Steve McMahon
- Stadium: County Ground
- Football League First Division: 19th
- FA Cup: Third round
- League Cup: Third round
- Top goalscorer: League: Allison (11); All: Allison (13)
- Highest home attendance: 14,374 vs. Manchester City (2 November 1996)
- Lowest home attendance: 6,730 vs. Southend United (5 April 1997)
- Average home league attendance: 9,917

During the 1996–97 English football season, Swindon Town F.C. competed in the Football League First Division.

== Season summary ==
With Swindon's financial state getting more precarious, they could not afford to build a side which would be able to win promotion to the Premier League, with McMahon's only significant summer signing the underwhelming Gary Elkins from Wimbledon. In 1996–97 season, Swindon held a mid-table position right up until the middle of March, but then scored just two goals in their last ten games – getting thumped 7–0 at Bolton, 5–1 at Oldham and 4–0 at Ipswich in the process – ending up in a disappointing 19th place.

== Final league table ==
Pos	Team	Pld	W	D	L	GF	GA	GD	Pts
17	Oxford United	46	16	9	21	64	68	−4	57
18	Reading	46	15	12	19	58	67	−9	57
19	Swindon Town	46	15	9	22	52	71	−19	54
20	Huddersfield Town	46	13	15	18	48	61	−13	54
21	Bradford City	46	12	12	22	47	72	−25	48

Rules for classification: 1) Points; 2) Goals scored; 3) Goal difference

== Results ==
Swindon Town's score comes first

=== Legend ===
Win	Draw	Loss

=== Football League First Division ===
Date	Opponent	Venue	Result	Attendance	Scorers
17 August 1996	Norwich City	A	0–2	15,165	
24 August 1996	Port Vale	H	1–1	8,706	Robinson
28 August 1996	Oldham Athletic	H	1–0	8,025	Allison
31 August 1996	Southend United	A	3–1	4,011	Watson, Cowe, Finney
7 September 1996	Grimsby Town	A	1–2	4,089	Cowe
11 September 1996	Portsmouth	H	0–1	8,685	
14 September 1996	Tranmere Rovers	H	2–1	8,430	Walters (pen), Horlock
21 September 1996	Queens Park Rangers	A	1–1	13,662	Cowe
27 September 1996	Wolverhampton Wanderers	H	1–2	8,572	Horlock
2 October 1996	Bradford City	A	1–2	9,249	Walters (pen)
12 October 1996	Oxford United	H	1–0	10,811	Horlock
16 October 1996	Huddersfield Town	H	6–0	7,724	Walters, Thorne (3), Allison, Horlock
19 October 1996	Crystal Palace	A	2–1	15,088	Allison, Thorne
26 October 1996	Reading	A	0–2	11,018	
30 October 1996	West Bromwich Albion	H	2–3	8,909	Allen, Thorne
2 November 1996	Manchester City	H	2–0	14,374	Allison (2)
16 November 1996	Barnsley	H	3–0	10,837	Walters, Gooden, Finney
19 November 1996	Ipswich Town	A	2–3	7,086	Thorne, Allison
23 November 1996	Birmingham City	A	0–1	16,559	
26 November 1996	Sheffield United	A	0–2	12,301	
30 November 1996	Reading	H	3–1	10,874	Horlock, Allison, Walters
7 December 1996	Charlton Athletic	A	0–2	10,565	
14 December 1996	Stoke City	A	0–2	10,102	
22 December 1996	Bolton Wanderers	H	2–2	8,946	Walters, Allison
26 December 1996	Portsmouth	A	1–0	10,605	Cowe
10 January 1997	Tranmere Rovers	A	1–2	8,763	Horlock
18 January 1997	Bradford City	H	1–1	7,851	Horlock
25 January 1997	Grimsby Town	H	3–3	9,127	Horlock, Allison, Walters
29 January 1997	Wolverhampton Wanderers	A	0–1	23,003	
1 February 1997	Sheffield United	H	2–1	8,811	Elkins, Holdsworth (own goal)
5 February 1997	Queens Park Rangers	H	1–1	10,830	Brevett (own goal)
8 February 1997	West Bromwich Albion	A	2–1	16,219	Allison, Smith
22 February 1997	Manchester City	A	0–3	27,262	
26 February 1997	Birmingham City	H	3–1	7,428	Bullock, Broomes, Cowe
1 March 1997	Charlton Athletic	H	1–0	9,256	Allison
4 March 1997	Barnsley	A	1–1	9,789	Thorne
8 March 1997	Bolton Wanderers	A	0–7	13,981	
15 March 1997	Stoke City	H	1–0	8,878	Thorne
22 March 1997	Port Vale	A	0–1	6,142	
29 March 1997	Norwich City	H	0–3	10,249	
31 March 1997	Oldham Athletic	A	1–5	5,699	Cowe
5 April 1997	Southend United	H	0–0	6,730	
12 April 1997	Ipswich Town	H	0–4	8,591	
19 April 1997	Oxford United	A	0–2	8,167	
26 April 1997	Crystal Palace	H	0–2	10,447	
4 May 1997	Huddersfield Town	A	0–0	11,506	

=== FA Cup ===
Round	Date	Opponent	Venue	Result	Attendance	Goalscorers
R3	5 January 1997	Everton	A	0–3	20,411	

=== League Cup ===
Round	Date	Opponent	Venue	Result	Attendance	Goalscorers
R1 First Leg	20 August 1996	Wolverhampton Wanderers	H	2–0	7,451	Allison, Leitch
R1 Second Leg	3 September 1996	Wolverhampton Wanderers	A	0–1 (won 2–1 on agg)	10,760	
R2 First Leg	18 September 1996	Queens Park Rangers	A	1–2	7,843	Walters
R2 Second Leg	25 September 1996	Queens Park Rangers	H	3–1 (won 4–3 on agg)	6,976	O'Sullivan, Allison, Thorne
R3	23 October 1996	Manchester United	A	1–2	49,305	Thorne

== Squad ==
Note: Flags indicate national team as defined under FIFA eligibility rules; some limited exceptions apply. Players may hold more than one non-FIFA nationality.

No.	Pos.	Nation	Player
—	GK	(England) ENG	Fraser Digby
—	GK	(England) ENG	Steve Mildenhall
—	GK	(Australia) AUS	Frank Talia
—	DF	(England) ENG	Marlon Broomes (on loan from Blackburn Rovers)
—	DF	(England) ENG	Ian Culverhouse
—	DF	(England) ENG	Jason Drysdale
—	DF	(England) ENG	Gary Elkins
—	DF	(England) ENG	David Kerslake (on loan from Tottenham Hotspur)
—	DF	(England) ENG	Phil King
—	DF	(England) ENG	Mark Robinson
—	DF	(England) ENG	Mark Seagraves
—	DF	(England) ENG	Shaun Taylor
—	DF	(Republic of Ireland) IRL	Graham Coughlan (on loan from Blackburn Rovers)
—	DF	(Republic of Ireland) IRL	Wayne O'Sullivan
—	DF	(France) FRA	Frédéric Darras
—	MF	(England) ENG	Paul Allen
—	MF	(England) ENG	Graham Anthony

No.	Pos.	Nation	Player
—	MF	(England) ENG	Darren Bullock
—	MF	(England) ENG	Ty Gooden
—	MF	(England) ENG	Peter Holcroft
—	MF	(England) ENG	Robin Hulbert
—	MF	(England) ENG	Steve McMahon
—	MF	(England) ENG	Alex Smith
—	MF	(England) ENG	Mark Walters
—	MF	(England) ENG	Kevin Watson
—	MF	(Wales) WAL	Michael Pattimore
—	MF	(Scotland) SCO	Lee Collins
—	MF	(Scotland) SCO	Scott Leitch
—	MF	(Northern Ireland) NIR	Kevin Horlock
—	FW	(England) ENG	Wayne Allison
—	FW	(England) ENG	Steve Cowe
—	FW	(England) ENG	Steve Finney
—	FW	(England) ENG	Peter Thorne
