= 1997–98 Swindon Town F.C. season =

Swindon Town
1997–98 season
- Chairman: Rikki Hunt
- Manager: Steve McMahon
- Stadium: County Ground
- First Division: 18th
- FA Cup: Third round
- League Cup: First round
- Top goalscorer: Hay (14)
- Average home league attendance: 10,298

During the 1997–98 English football season, Swindon Town F.C. competed in the Football League First Division.

== Season summary ==
Swindon started the season brilliantly and at the end of October they were top of the table but it all started to go downhill after hammering Oxford 4–1 in December, when Swindon managed just three more wins from the remaining 26 league games which also included an embarrassing FA Cup home defeat to non-league Stevenage. They finished the season in a lowly 18th position, and the pressure on McMahon to resign was immense, but chairman Rikki Hunt refused to sack him.

== Final league table ==
Pos	Team	Pld	W	D	L	GF	GA	GD	Pts
16	Huddersfield Town	46	14	11	21	50	72	−22	53
17	Bury	46	11	19	16	42	58	−16	52
18	Swindon Town	46	14	10	22	42	73	−31	52
19	Port Vale	46	13	10	23	56	66	−10	49
20	Portsmouth	46	13	10	23	51	63	−12	49

Source: Statto.com
Rules for classification: 1) Points; 2) Goals scored; 3) Goal difference

== Results ==
Swindon Town's score comes first

=== Legend ===
Win	Draw	Loss

=== Football League First Division ===
Date	Opponent	Venue	Result	Attendance	Scorers
9 August 1997	Crewe Alexandra	H	2–0	8,334	Allison, Finney (pen)
16 August 1997	Reading	A	1–0	9,338	Hay
23 August 1997	Huddersfield Town	H	1–1	7,683	Hay
30 August 1997	Stoke City	A	2–1	23,000	Allison, Hay
2 September 1997	Ipswich Town	A	1–2	11,246	Allison
7 September 1997	Nottingham Forest	H	0–0	13,051	
13 September 1997	Tranmere Rovers	H	2–1	6,811	Walters, Casper
20 September 1997	West Bromwich Albion	A	0–0	16,237	
27 September 1997	Manchester City	A	0–6	26,646	
4 October 1997	Port Vale	H	4–2	8,048	Hay (3), Taylor
11 October 1997	Bury	H	3–1	7,640	Hay (2), Gooden
18 October 1997	Wolverhampton Wanderers	A	1–3	21,794	Hay (pen)
21 October 1997	Sunderland	A	0–0	27,553	
25 October 1997	Norwich City	H	1–0	9,256	Hay
31 October 1997	Portsmouth	A	1–0	8,707	Hay
5 November 1997	Queens Park Rangers	H	3–1	10,132	Walters, Taylor, Hay
8 November 1997	Bradford City	H	1–0	10,029	Cowe
15 November 1997	Stockport County	A	2–4	7,694	Hay, Leitch
22 November 1997	Middlesbrough	H	1–2	15,228	Ndah
28 November 1997	Charlton Athletic	A	0–3	13,769	
6 December 1997	Oxford United	H	4–1	10,902	Wilsterman (own goal), Walters (pen), Finney, Gooden
13 December 1997	Sheffield United	A	1–2	18,115	Finney
20 December 1997	Birmingham City	H	1–1	10,334	Finney
26 December 1997	Nottingham Forest	A	0–3	26,500	
28 December 1997	Ipswich Town	H	0–2	10,609	
11 January 1998	Crewe Alexandra	A	0–2	4,176	
17 January 1998	Reading	H	0–2	9,500	
24 January 1998	Bradford City	A	1–1	15,130	Hay
28 January 1998	Stoke City	H	1–0	6,683	Robinson
31 January 1998	Huddersfield Town	A	0–0	10,028	
7 February 1998	West Bromwich Albion	H	0–2	9,861	
10 February 1998	Tranmere Rovers	A	0–3	5,288	
17 February 1998	Port Vale	A	1–0	5,925	Collins
21 February 1998	Manchester City	H	1–3	12,280	Cowe
28 February 1998	Bury	A	0–1	5,002	
7 March 1998	Portsmouth	H	0–1	9,100	
11 March 1998	Middlesbrough	A	0–6	29,581	
14 March 1998	Queens Park Rangers	A	2–1	13,486	Walters (pen), Onoura
18 March 1998	Wolverhampton Wanderers	H	0–0	7,770	
21 March 1998	Stockport County	H	1–1	6,684	McDonald
4 April 1998	Charlton Athletic	H	0–1	7,845	
11 April 1998	Oxford United	A	1-2	8,005	Ndah (pen)
13 April 1998	Sheffield United	H	1–1	5,956	Walters
18 April 1998	Birmingham City	A	0–3	17,016	
25 April 1998	Norwich City	A	0–5	18,443	
3 May 1998	Sunderland	H	1–2	14,868	Walters

=== FA Cup ===
Round	Date	Opponent	Venue	Result	Attendance	Goalscorers
R3	3 January 1998	Stevenage Borough	H	1–2	9,422	Walters

=== League Cup ===
Round	Date	Opponent	Venue	Result	Attendance	Goalscorers
R1 First Leg	13 August 1997	Watford	H	0–2	6,271	
R1 Second Leg	26 August 1997	Watford	A	1–1 (lost 1–3 on agg)	7,712	Leitch

== Squad ==
Note: Flags indicate national team as defined under FIFA eligibility rules; some limited exceptions apply. Players may hold more than one non-FIFA nationality.

No.	Pos.	Nation	Player
—	GK	(England) ENG	Fraser Digby
—	DF	(England) ENG	Brian Borrows
—	DF	(Northern Ireland) NIR	Alan McDonald
—	DF	(England) ENG	Craig Taylor
—	DF	(England) ENG	Mark Robinson
—	MF	(England) ENG	Ty Gooden
—	MF	(England) ENG	Darren Bullock
—	MF	(England) ENG	Mark Walters
—	MF	(Scotland) SCO	Scott Leitch
—	FW	(Scotland) SCO	Chris Hay
—	FW	(England) ENG	Steve Finney
—	FW	(England) ENG	Wayne Allison
—	MF	(Scotland) SCO	Lee Collins
—	MF	(France) FRA	Philippe Cuervo
—	FW	(England) ENG	George Ndah
—	GK	(England) ENG	Steve Mildenhall
—	MF	(England) ENG	Kevin Watson
—	DF	(England) ENG	Frédéric Darras
—	DF	(England) ENG	Jason Drysdale
—	DF	(England) ENG	David Kerslake
—	MF	(England) ENG	David Thompson (on loan from Liverpool)

No.	Pos.	Nation	Player
—	DF	(England) ENG	Ian Culverhouse
—	MF	(England) ENG	Bobby Howe
—	FW	(England) ENG	Steve Cowe
—	DF	(England) ENG	Chris Casper (on loan from Manchester United)
—	FW	(England) ENG	Iffy Onuora
—	DF	(England) ENG	Mark Seagraves
—	DF	(England) ENG	Sol Davis
—	MF	(England) ENG	Alex Smith
—	GK	(Australia) AUS	Frank Talia
—	GK	(Trinidad and Tobago) TRI	Tony Warner (on loan from Liverpool)
—	MF	(England) ENG	Stuart Elliott (on loan from Newcastle United)
—	MF	(England) ENG	Steve McMahon
—	MF	(England) ENG	Robin Hulbert
—	FW	(England) ENG	Alex Meechan
—	MF	(Northern Ireland) NIR	Paul McAreavey
—	MF	(Wales) WAL	Michael Pattimore
—	DF	(England) ENG	Phil King
—	DF	(England) ENG	Adam Willis
