= Alexander Smith =

Alexander Smith may refer to:

== Politics ==
- Alexander Smith (American politician) (1818–1878), American businessman and congressman-elect
- Alexander Mortimer Smith (1818–1895), Scottish/Canadian soldier, businessman, and political figure
- Alexander Kennedy Smith (1824–1881), Scottish/Australian engineer and politician
- Alexander Wilson Smith (1856–1913), farmer and political figure in Ontario, Canada
- Alexander S. Smith (1868–1916), politician in Saskatchewan, Canada
- Lockwood Smith (Alexander Lockwood Smith, born 1948), New Zealand politician

== Religion ==
- Alexander Smith (bishop, born 1684) (1684–1766), Scottish Roman Catholic bishop
- Alexander Smith (bishop, born 1813) (1813–1861), Scottish Roman Catholic bishop
- Alexander Hale Smith (1838–1909), American religious leader

== Literature ==
- Alexander Smith (biographer) (fl. 1714–1726), British compiler of volumes of biographies
- Alexander Smith (philosopher) (1796–1851), Scottish philosopher
- Alexander Smith (poet) (1829–1867), Scottish poet
- Alexander Howland Smith (1859–1913), Scottish document forger in the 1880s
- Alexander McCall Smith (born 1948), British writer and professor of medical law
- Alexander O. Smith (born 1973), English/Japanese translator and writer
- Alexander Gordon Smith (born 1979), British author of books for children and young adults

== Other ==
- John Adams (mutineer) (1767–1829), mutineer on HMS Bounty, known as Alexander Smith
- Alexander Smith (golfer) (fl. 1860), Scottish golfer
- Aleck C. Smith (Alexander C. Smith, fl. 1860s), justice of the Idaho Territorial Supreme Court
- Alexander Smith (chemist) (1865–1922), American chemist and author
- Aleck Smith (Alexander Smith, 1871–1919), American baseball catcher
- Alexander H. Smith (1904–1986), American mycologist
- Ross Alexander (Alexander Ross Smith, 1907–1937), American actor
- Alexander Smith (businessman), British CEO of Pier I
- Alexander Tyler Smith (1993–1994), 14-month-old boy murdered by his mother Susan Smith

== See also ==
- Alex Smith (disambiguation)
- Alec Smith (disambiguation)
- Sandy Smith (disambiguation)
- Alexander Smith Cochran (1874–1929), American sportsman and philanthropist
- Alexander Smith Taylor (1817–1876), collector, author and historian
- Alexander Smith Carpet Mills Historic District, listed on the U.S. National Register of Historic Places
- Alexander Smith House (disambiguation)
