= Alex Smith (disambiguation) =

Alex Smith (born 1984) is an American football quarterback.

Alex Smith may also refer to:

== Association football ==
- Alex Smith (footballer, born 1915) (1915–?), Scottish footballer (Liverpool)
- Alex Smith (footballer, born 1938) (1938–2023), English football goalkeeper (Halifax Town)
- Alex Smith (footballer, born 1939), Scottish footballer and manager (St. Mirren, Aberdeen, Dundee United)
- Alex Smith (footballer, born 1940), Scottish footballer (Dunfermline Athletic, Rangers)
- Alex Smith (footballer, born 1944), English footballer (Middlesbrough)
- Alex Smith (footballer, born 1947), English footballer (Bradford City, Southend United)
- Alex Smith (New Zealand footballer), New Zealand international footballer
- Alex Smith (footballer, born 1976), English footballer (Port Vale, Wrexham)
- Alex Smith (footballer, born 1985), English footballer (FC Dallas, Sydney Olympic, Wellington Phoenix)
- Alex Smith (footballer, born 1991), English footballer (Yeovil Town)

== Other sports ==
- Alex Smith (golfer) (1874–1930), member of a famous Scottish golfing family
- Alex Smith (ice hockey) (1902–1963), Canadian NHL hockey player
- Alex Smith (tight end) (born 1982), American football tight end
- Alex Smith (hammer thrower) (born 1988), English hammer thrower

== Others ==
- Alex Smith (c. 1862–1922), African-American man who was lynched by a white mob in Gulfport, Mississippi, in 1922; see Lynching of Alex Smith
- Alex Smith (builder) (1899–1973), Australian heritage designer-builder on the Redcliffe Peninsula
- Alex Smith (engineer) (1922–2003), Scottish industrial scientist and educator
- Alex Smith (politician) (born 1943), Labour MEP for South of Scotland
- Alex T. Smith (born 1985), British author and illustrator of children's books
- Alex Smith (businessman) (born 1986), American businessman
- Alex Smith, member of British comedy trio Hat Films
- Alex Smith, member of the American pop duo Brit & Alex along with her twin sister, Brit Smith

== See also ==
- Alec Smith (disambiguation)
- Alexander Smith (disambiguation)
- Sandy Smith (disambiguation)
- Alex Smit (born 1985), Dutch baseball player
- Alix Smith (born 1978), American photographer
