= 2001–02 Reading F.C. season =

Reading
2001–02 season
- Chairman: John Madejski
- Manager: Alan Pardew
- Second Division: 2nd
- FA Cup: Second round vs York City
- League Cup: Third round vs Aston Villa
- League Trophy: Quarter-final vs Barnet
- Top goalscorer: League: Nicky Forster (18); All: Nicky Forster (18)
Home colours

The 2001–02 season was Reading's fourth season in Division Two, following their relegation from the division One in 1998. It was Alan Pardew's third season as manager of the club. Reading finished the season in second place, earning promotion back to the First Division. In the FA Cup, Reading were knocked out by York City after the second round for the second year running, whilst in the League Cup, Aston Villa defeated Reading over in the third round. Reading also reached the Quarterfinals of the League Trophy, before defeat to Barnet.

== Season review ==
See also Nationwide League Division Two

== Squad ==
As of match played 20 April 2002

No.	Name	Nationality	Position	Date of birth (Age (Note: Age as of the end of the season))	Signed from	Signed in	Contract ends	Apps.	Goals
Goalkeepers
1	Phil Whitehead	(England)	GK	17 December 1969 (aged 32)	West Bromwich Albion	1999		104	0
21	Jamie Ashdown	(England)	GK	30 November 1980 (aged 21)	Academy	1998		5	0
30	Frank Talia	(Australia)	GK	20 July 1972 (aged 29)	Royal Antwerp	2002	2002	0	0
	Antony Malessa	(England)	GK	13 November 1980 (aged 21)	Oxford United	2001		0	0
Defenders
2	Graeme Murty	(England) (Note: Graeme Murty was born in Saltburn-by-the-Sea, England, but also qualified to represent Scotland internationally through his father, going on to make his debut for Scotland in 2004.)	DF	13 November 1974 (aged 27)	York City	1998		107	1
3	Matthew Robinson	(England)	DF	23 December 1974 (aged 27)	Portsmouth	2000		75	0
5	Adi Viveash	(England)	DF	30 September 1969 (aged 32)	Walsall	2000	2003	86	4
8	Ady Williams	(Wales) (Note: Ady Williams was born in Reading, England, but also qualified to represent Wales internationally through his father, and would make his international debut for Wales on 23 May 1994.)	DF	16 September 1971 (aged 30)	Wolverhampton Wanderers	2000	2003		
18	Adrian Whitbread	(England)	DF	22 October 1971 (aged 30)	loan from Portsmouth	2001	2003	37	0
23	John Mackie	(England)	DF	5 July 1976 (aged 25)	Sutton United	1999		47	2
25	Ricky Newman	(England)	DF	5 August 1970 (aged 31)	Millwall	2000		51	2
26	Alex Smith	(England)	DF	15 February 1976 (aged 26)	Port Vale	2001	2003	17	3
27	Ricky Allaway	(England)	DF	12 February 1983 (aged 19)	Academy	1999		0	0
28	Nicky Shorey	(England)	DF	19 February 1981 (aged 21)	Leyton Orient	2001	2004	38	0
32	Leo Roget	(England)	DF	1 August 1977 (aged 24)	loan from Stockport County	2002	2002	1	0
Midfielders
4	Keith Jones	(England)	MF	14 October 1965 (aged 36)	Charlton Athletic	2000	2002	45	1
6	Kevin Watson	(England)	MF	3 January 1974 (aged 28)	Rotherham United	2002		12	1
7	Tony Rougier	(Trinidad and Tobago)	MF	17 July 1971 (aged 30)	Port Vale	2000	2003	77	3
11	Andrew Hughes	(England)	MF	2 January 1978 (aged 24)	Notts County	2001	2004	42	6
14	Sammy Igoe	(England)	MF	30 September 1975 (aged 26)	Portsmouth	2000		87	7
15	James Harper	(England)	MF	9 November 1980 (aged 21)	Arsenal	200	2005	46	2
16	Phil Parkinson	(England)	MF	1 December 1967 (aged 34)	Bury	1992		419	24
17	Neil Smith	(England)	MF	30 September 1971 (aged 30)	Fulham	1999		77	4
19	Joe Gamble	(Republic of Ireland)	MF	14 January 1982 (aged 20)	Cork City	2000		13	0
29	John Salako	(England) (Note: John Salako was born in Ibadan, Nigeria, but also qualified to represent England internationally, making his international debut for England in 1991.)	MF	11 February 1969 (aged 33)	Charlton Athletic	2001	2003	32	6
45	Adam Campion	(England)	MF	4 October 1982 (aged 19)	Academy	2001		0	0
	Steve Warren	(England)	MF	27 September 1983 (aged 18)	Crystal Palace	2002		0	0
Forwards
9	Martin Butler	(England)	FW	15 September 1974 (aged 27)	Cambridge United	2000		91	34
10	Nicky Forster	(England)	FW	8 September 1973 (aged 28)	Birmingham City	1999		103	30
12	Jamie Cureton	(England)	FW	28 August 1975 (aged 26)	Bristol Rovers	2000	2003	95	46
20	Bas Savage	(England)	FW	7 January 1982 (aged 20)	Academy	2001		1	0
22	Nathan Tyson	(England)	FW	4 May 1982 (aged 19)	Academy	1999		5	0
24	Darius Henderson	(England)	FW	7 September 1981 (aged 20)	Academy	1999		57	11
31	Michael Branch	(England)	FW	18 October 1978 (aged 23)	loan from Wolverhampton Wanderers	2002	2002	2	0
Out on loan
Left during the season
6	Barry Hunter	(Northern Ireland)	DF	18 November 1968 (aged 33)	Wrexham	1996		100	6
20	Chris Casper	(England)	DF	28 April 1975 (aged 26)	Manchester United	1998		55	0
29	Adam Lockwood	(England)	DF	26 October 1981 (aged 20)	Academy	1999		0	0
31	Marcus Hahnemann	(United States)	GK	15 June 1972 (aged 29)	loan from Fulham	2001	2002	6	0
31	Ben Roberts	(England)	GK	22 June 1975 (aged 26)	loan from Charlton Athletic	2002	2002	6	0

=== Left club during season ===
Note: Flags indicate national team as defined under FIFA eligibility rules; some limited exceptions apply. Players may hold more than one non-FIFA nationality.

No.	Pos.	Nation	Player
6	DF	NIR	Barry Hunter (to Rushden & Diamonds)
20	DF	ENG	Chris Casper (Retired)
29	DF	ENG	Adam Lockwood (to Yeovil Town)

No.	Pos.	Nation	Player
31	GK	USA	Marcus Hahnemann (loan return to Fulham)
31	GK	ENG	Ben Roberts (loan return to Charlton Athletic)

== Transfers ==
=== In ===
Date	Position	Nationality	Name	From	Fee	Ref.
5 July 2001	DF	(England)	Adrian Whitbread	Portsmouth	Free	
5 July 2001	MF	(England)	Andy Hughes	Notts County	£250,000 (by a tribunal)	
18 July 2001	DF	(England)	Alex Smith	Port Vale	Bosman	
30 November 2001	GK	(England)	Antony Malessa	Oxford United	Free	
28 January 2002	MF	(England)	John Salako	Charlton Athletic	£50,000	
13 March 2002	GK	(Australia)	Frank Talia	Royal Antwerp	Free	
15 March 2002	MF	(England)	Kevin Watson	Rotherham United	£150,000	
10 April 2002	MF	(England)	Steve Warren	Crystal Palace	Undisclosed	

=== Loans in ===
Date from	Position	Nationality	Name	From	Date to	Ref.
2 November 2001	MF	(England)	John Salako	Charlton Athletic	27 January 2001	
2 November 2001	MF	(England)	Kevin Watson	Rotherham United	2 December 2001	
12 December 2001	GK	(United States)	Marcus Hahnemann	Fulham	14 January 2002	
17 January 2002	GK	(England)	Ben Roberts	Charlton Athletic	14 February 2002	
13 February 2002	DF	(England)	Leo Roget	Stockport County	End of Season	
21 March 2002	FW	(England)	Michael Branch	Wolverhampton Wanderers	End of Season	

=== Out ===
Date	Position	Nationality	Name	To	Fee	Ref.
13 September 2001	DF	(Northern Ireland)	Barry Hunter	Rushden & Diamonds	Free	
16 October 2001	DF	(England)	Adam Lockwood	Yeovil Town	Free	

=== Loans out ===
Date from	Position	Nationality	Name	To	Date to	Ref.
20 September 2001	DF	(England)	Adam Lockwood	Yeovil Town	One Month	
11 January 2002	GK	(England)	Antony Malessa	Shrewsbury Town	11 February 2002	

=== Released ===
Date	Position	Nationality	Name	Joined	Date
30 January 2002	DF	(England)	Chris Casper	Retired	
24 April 2002	DF	(England)	Matthew Robinson	Oxford United	
24 April 2002	MF	(England)	Keith Jones	Retired	
24 April 2002	MF	(England)	Neil Smith	Stevenage	
30 June 2002	GK	(England)	Antony Malessa		

=== Trial ===
Date from	Date to	Position	Nationality	Name
21 November 2001	28 November 2001	GK	(South Africa)	Chad Harpur

== Competitions ==
Competition	Started round	Current position / round	Final position / round	First match	Last match
Division Two	—	—	2nd	11 August 2001	20 April 2002
FL Cup	1st round	—	3rd round	10 October 2001	21 August 2001
FA Cup	1st round	—	2R	17 November 2001	8 December 2001
FL Trophy	2nd round	—	QF	30 October 2001	4 December 2001

Updated to match played 17 November 2011
Source: Competitions

=== Division Two ===
==== Results summary ====
Overall								Home						Away					
Pld	W	D	L	GF	GA	GD	Pts	W	D	L	GF	GA	GD	W	D	L	GF	GA	GD
46	23	15	8	70	43	+27	84	12	7	4	36	20	+16	11	8	4	34	23	+11

==== Results by round ====
Round	1	2	3	4	5	6	7	8	9	10	11	12	13	14	15	16	17	18	19	20	21	22	23	24	25	26	27	28	29	30	31	32	33	34	35	36	37	38	39	40	41	42	43	44	45	46
Ground	A	H	A	A	H	A	H	H	A	H	A	H	A	A	H	A	H	H	H	A	H	H	A	A	H	H	A	H	A	H	A	H	A	A	H	A	A	H	H	A	H	A	H	A	H	A
Result	W	W	D	W	L	L	W	W	L	D	L	L	W	W	L	W	W	W	W	W	L	D	D	W	W	W	W	W	W	W	D	W	L	D	W	W	D	D	D	W	D	D	D	D	D	D
Position	4	3	4	3	7	10	6	5	8	9	11	14	11	9	11	8	4	4	4	4	4	5	5	5	4	2	1	1	1	1	1	1	1	1	1	1	1	1	1	1	1	1	2	2	2	2

Source: Reading FC; 11v11
A = Away; H = Home; W = Win; D = Draw; L = Loss

==== Fixtures & results ====
11 August 2001	Blackpool	0–2	Reading	Bloomfield Road
15:00		Report	Parkinson 31'; Forster 75'	Attendance: 5,613

18 August 2001	Reading	1–0	Huddersfield Town	Madejski Stadium
15:00	Forster 8'	Report		Attendance: 11,915

25 August 2001	Queens Park Rangers	0–0	Reading	Loftus Road
15:00		Report		Attendance: 13,829

1 September 2001	Port Vale	0–2	Reading	Vale Park
15:00		Report	Cureton 45', 62'	Attendance: 5,196

8 September 2001	Reading	1–2	Cardiff City	Madejski Stadium
15:00	Smith 32'; Parkinson (red card) 82'	Report	Fortune-West 13', 36'	Attendance: 13,017

15 September 2001	Stoke City	2–0	Reading	Britannia Stadium
15:00	Guðjónsson 25'; Cooke 28'	Report		Attendance: 11,752

18 September 2001	Reading	1–0	Cambridge United	Madejski Stadium
19:45	Harper 63'	Report		Attendance: 8,348

22 September 2001	Reading	2–0	Wycombe Wanderers	Madejski Stadium
15:00	Williams 16'; Henderson 18'	Report	Holligan (yellow card) 1' (yellow-red card) 60'	Attendance: 13,565

25 September 2001	Bournemouth	1–0	Reading	Dean Court
19:45	Hayter 71'	Report		Attendance: 3,691

29 September 2001	Reading	1–1	Bury	Madejski Stadium
15:00	Igoe 45+2'	Report	Lawson 90'	Attendance: 10,035

5 October 2001	Colchester United	2–0	Reading	Layer Road
19:45	Rapley 8'; McGleish 26'	Report		Attendance: 3,691

13 October 2001	Reading	1–3	Swindon Town	Madejski Stadium
15:00	Henderson 80'	Report	Grazioli 38'; Invincibile 52'; Kuffour 87'	Attendance: 14,389

20 October 2001	Notts County	3–4	Reading	Meadow Lane
15:00	Allsopp 7', 68' (pen.); Grayson 84'	Report	Hughes 4'; Cureton 13', 43'; Smith 49'	Attendance: 5,604

23 October 2001	Oldham Athletic	0–1	Reading	Boundary Park
19:45		Report	Cureton 19'	Attendance: 4,901

27 October 2001	Reading	1–2	Brentford	Madejski Stadium
15:00	Butler 53' (pen.)	Report	Ingimarsson 69'; Price 73'	Attendance: 14,680

3 November 2001	Northampton Town	0–2	Reading	Sixfields Stadium
15:00		Report	Cureton 52'; Butler 90'	Attendance: 5,162

6 November 2001	Reading	2–0	Wrexham	Madejski Stadium
19:45	Forster 69'; Henderson 89'	Report		Attendance: 8,081

10 November 2001	Reading	3–2	Bristol City	Madejski Stadium
15:00	Mackie 12'; Lever 44' (o.g.); Salako 51'	Report	Murty 34' (o.g.); Thorpe 59'	Attendance: 14,060

20 November 2001	Reading	4–1	Tranmere Rovers	Madejski Stadium
19:45	Smith 25'; Forster 38', 61'; Henderson 90+2'	Report	N'Diaye (red card) 22'; Price 77'	Attendance: 9,007

24 November 2001	Peterborough United	1–2	Reading	London Road Stadium
15:00	Clarke 6'; Edwards (yellow card) 57' (yellow-red card) 71'	Report	Henderson 83', 90+4'	Attendance: 5,695

1 December 2001	Reading	0–1	Chesterfield	Madejski Stadium
15:00		Report	Howard 10'	Attendance: 11,209

22 December 2001	Reading	1–1	Wigan Athletic	Madejski Stadium
15:00	Salako 6'	Report	Haworth 57'	Attendance: 15,808

26 December 2001	Cardiff City	2–2	Reading	Ninian Park
12:00	Earnshaw 29', 67'	Report	Forster 56'; Salako 78'	Attendance: 16,708

29 December 2001	Wrexham	0–2	Reading	Racecourse Ground
15:00		Report	Forster 30'; Salako 66'	Attendance: 3,885

1 January 2002	Reading	2–0	Port Vale	Madejski Stadium
15:00	Cureton 83' (pen.), 89'	Report		Attendance: 10,743

5 January 2002	Reading	1–0	Queens Park Rangers	Madejski Stadium
15:00	Hughes 57'	Report		Attendance: 19,329

12 January 2002	Huddersfield Town	0–1	Reading	McAlpine Stadium
15:00		Report	Forster 56'	Attendance: 10,775

19 January 2002	Reading	3–0	Blackpool	Madejski Stadium
15:00	Forster 20', 22', 50'	Report		Attendance: 13,732

22 January 2002	Wigan Athletic	0–2	Reading	JJB Stadium
19:45		Report	Hughes 24'; Forster 42'	Attendance: 5,536

26 January 2002	Reading	3–0	Colchester United	Madejski Stadium
15:00	Forster 38' (pen.), 69'; Hughes 48'	Report		Attendance: 12,743

2 February 2002	Bury	1–1	Reading	Gigg Lane
15:00	Newby 21'	Report	Salako 78'	Attendance: 3,667

9 February 2002	Reading	2–1	Notts County	Madejski Stadium
15:00	Garden 23' (o.g.); Cureton 90+3'	Report	Liburd 18'	Attendance: 13,564

11 February 2002	Brighton & Hove Albion	3–1	Reading	Withdean Stadium
19:45	Zamora 60'; Melton 64'; Lewis 88'	Report	Cureton 90+1'	Attendance: 6,756

14 February 2002	Swindon Town	0–0	Reading	The County Ground
19:45	McAreavey (red card) 88'; Reeves (red card) 90+3'	Report	Igoe (yellow card) 20' (yellow-red card) 44'	Attendance: 9,264

23 February 2002	Reading	1–0	Stoke City	Madejski Stadium
15:00	Cureton 51'	Report		Attendance: 21,032

26 February 2002	Wycombe Wanderers	0–2	Reading	Adams Park
20:00^{1}		Report	Cureton 67'; Henderson 90+1'	Attendance: 9,250

2 March 2002	Cambridge United	2–2	Reading	Abbey Stadium
15:00	Kitson 14'; Youngs 32'	Report	Viveash 57'; Forster 70'	Attendance: 3,841

5 March 2002	Reading	2–2	Bournemouth	Madejski Stadium
19:45	Cureton 5'; Hughes 80'	Report	Hayter 48'; Holmes 71'	Attendance: 13,538

9 March 2002	Reading	0–0	Brighton & Hove Albion	Madejski Stadium
15:00		Report		Attendance: 22,009

16 March 2002	Chesterfield	0–2	Reading	Recreation Ground
15:00		Report	Forster 30'; Cureton 45'	Attendance: 5,145

23 March 2002	Reading	2–2	Oldham Athletic	Madejski Stadium
15:00	Mackie 8'; Parkinson 46'	Report	Duxbury 31'; Smart 75'	Attendance: 15,191

30 March 2002	Bristol City	3–3	Reading	Ashton Gate
15:00	Peacock 6'; Bell 13' (pen.); Robinson 59'	Report	Hughes 2'; Forster 5' (pen.); Watson 14'	Attendance: 15,609

1 April 2002	Reading	0–0	Northampton Town	Madejski Stadium
15:00		Report		Attendance: 16,495

7 April 2002	Tranmere Rovers	2–2	Reading	Prenton Park
	Barlow 41'; Haworth 48'	Report	Rougier 49'; Salako 72'	Attendance: 9,282

13 April 2002	Reading	2–2	Peterborough United	Madejski Stadium
15:00	Forster 72', 79'	Report	Gill 29'; McKenzie 83'	Attendance: 22,151

20 April 2002	Brentford	1–1	Reading	Griffin Park
15:00	Rowlands 51'		Cureton 77'	Attendance: 11,303

Notes

- Kick-off delayed until 20:00 from 19:45

==== League table ====
Pos	Team	Pld	W	D	L	GF	GA	GD	Pts	Promotion or relegation
1	Brighton & Hove Albion (C, P)	46	25	15	6	66	42	+24	90	Promotion to Football League First Division
2	Reading (P)	46	23	15	8	70	43	+27	84	Promotion to Football League First Division
3	Brentford	46	24	11	11	77	43	+34	83	Qualification for the Second Division play-offs
4	Cardiff City	46	23	14	9	75	50	+25	83	Qualification for the Second Division play-offs
5	Stoke City (O, P)	46	23	11	12	67	40	+27	80	Qualification for the Second Division play-offs

Rules for classification: In the Football League goals scored (GF) takes precedence over goal difference (GD).
(C) Champions; (O) Play-off winners; (P) Promoted

=== FA Cup ===
17 November 2001 First round	Reading	1–0	Welling United	Reading
15:00 GMT (UTC)	Cureton 61'; N.Smith (yellow card)	Report	Overton (red card) 45'; D.Powell (yellow card); Lindsey (yellow card)	Stadium: Madejski Stadium; Attendance: 5,338; Referee: G.Hegley

8 December 2001 Second round	York City	2–0	Reading	York
15:00 GMT (UTC)	Richardson 3'; Potter 42'; Cooper (yellow card); Proctor (yellow card)	Report	Murty (yellow card)	Stadium: Bootham Crescent; Attendance: 3,161; Referee: B.Curson

=== League Cup ===
21 August 2001 First round	Reading	4–0	Luton Town	Reading
19:45 BST (UTC+1)	Henderson 38', 90'; Parkinson 45'; A.Smith 51' (yellow card)	Report	Forbes (yellow card); Hughes (yellow card)	Stadium: Madejski Stadium; Attendance: 5,115; Referee: D.R.Crick

11 September 2001 Second round	Reading	0–0 (a.e.t.) (6 – 5 p)	West Ham United	Reading
19:45 BST (UTC+1)		Report	Minto (yellow card); Song (yellow card)	Stadium: Madejski Stadium; Attendance: 21,173; Referee: Bill Jordan
	Penalties
	A.Smith (penalty scored); Murty (penalty scored); Rougier (penalty scored); Harper (penalty missed); Igoe (penalty scored); Henderson (penalty scored); Viveash (penalty scored)		(penalty scored) Hutchison; (penalty scored) Courtois; (penalty scored) Carrick; (penalty scored) Sinclair; (penalty missed) Defoe; (penalty scored) Dailly; (penalty missed) Minto

10 October 2001 Third round	Aston Villa	1–0	Reading	Birmingham
19:45 BST (UTC+1)	Dublin 45'; Wright (yellow card); Hadji (yellow card); Boateng (yellow card)	Report	Parkinson (yellow card)	Stadium: Villa Park; Attendance: 23,431; Referee: Matt Messias

=== League Trophy South ===
30 October 2001 Second round	Reading	2–1	Colchester United	Reading
20:00 GMT (UTC)	N.Smith 50' (yellow card); Henderson 72'	Report	Stockwell 77'	Stadium: Madejski Stadium; Attendance: 2,725; Referee: A.R.Hall

4 December 2001 Quarter Final	Barnet	4–1	Reading	Chipping Barnet
19:45 GMT (UTC)	Strevens 14', 78'; Arber 29'; Berkley 90'; Gledhill (yellow card)	Report	Henderson 15' (red card) 44'	Stadium: Underhill Stadium; Attendance: 1,171; Referee: Bill Jordan

== Squad statistics ==
As of match played 20 April 2002

=== Appearances and goals ===
No.	Pos	Nat	Player	Total		Division Two		FA Cup		League Cup		League Trophy	
No.	Pos	Nat	Player	Apps	Goals	Apps	Goals	Apps	Goals	Apps	Goals	Apps	Goals
1	GK	(England) ENG	Phil Whitehead	37	0	33	0	1	0	3	0	0	0
2	DF	(Scotland) SCO	Graeme Murty	48	0	43	0	2	0	2	0	1	0
3	DF	(England) ENG	Matthew Robinson	16	0	14	0	0	0	1+1	0	0	0
4	MF	(England) ENG	Keith Jones	17	0	10+6	0	1	0	0	0	0	0
5	DF	(England) ENG	Adi Viveash	24	1	18	1	2	0	1+1	0	2	0
6	MF	(England) ENG	Kevin Watson	12	1	12	1	0	0	0	0	0	0
7	MF	(Trinidad and Tobago) TTO	Tony Rougier	39	1	20+13	1	1	0	1+2	0	1+1	0
8	DF	(Wales) WAL	Ady Williams	40	1	33+2	1	1	0	3	0	1	0
9	FW	(England) ENG	Martin Butler	19	2	14+3	2	0	0	2	0	0	0
10	FW	(England) ENG	Nicky Forster	47	18	36+6	18	1	0	2	0	2	0
11	MF	(England) ENG	Andy Hughes	42	6	34+5	6	2	0	0	0	1	0
12	FW	(England) ENG	Jamie Cureton	42	16	24+14	15	2	1	1+1	0	0	0
14	MF	(England) ENG	Sammy Igoe	41	1	27+8	1	0+2	0	2	0	1+1	0
15	MF	(England) ENG	James Harper	32	1	19+7	1	1	0	3	0	1+1	0
16	MF	(England) ENG	Phil Parkinson	37	3	32+1	2	0	0	3	1	0+1	0
17	MF	(England) ENG	Neil Smith	17	2	3+11	1	1	0	1	0	1	1
18	DF	(England) ENG	Adrian Whitbread	18	0	14	0	1	0	3	0	0	0
19	MF	(Republic of Ireland) IRL	Joe Gamble	10	0	2+4	0	1	0	0+1	0	2	0
20	FW	(England) ENG	Bas Savage	1	0	0+1	0	0	0	0	0	0	0
21	GK	(England) ENG	Jamie Ashdown	4	0	1	0	1	0	0	0	2	0
22	FW	(England) ENG	Nathan Tyson	4	0	0+1	0	0+1	0	0+1	0	0+1	0
23	DF	(England) ENG	John Mackie	31	2	27	2	0+2	0	0	0	1+1	0
24	FW	(England) ENG	Darius Henderson	45	11	2+36	7	1+1	0	1+2	2	2	2
26	DF	(England) ENG	Alex Smith	17	3	12+1	2	1	0	2	1	1	0
28	DF	(England) ENG	Nicky Shorey	38	0	32	0	2	0	2	0	2	0
29	MF	(England) ENG	John Salako	32	6	31	6	0	0	0	0	1	0
31	FW	(England) ENG	Michael Branch	2	0	0+2	0	0	0	0	0	0	0
32	DF	(England) ENG	Leo Roget	1	0	1	0	0	0	0	0	0	0
Players who appeared for Reading and left during the season:
31	GK	(United States) USA	Marcus Hahnemann	6	0	6	0	0	0	0	0	0	0
31	GK	(England) ENG	Ben Roberts	6	0	6	0	0	0	0	0	0	0

=== Goalscorers ===
Place	Position	Nation	Number	Name	Division Two	FA Cup	League Cup	League Trophy	Total
1	FW	(England)	10	Nicky Forster	18	0	0	0	18
2	FW	(England)	12	Jamie Cureton	15	0	1	0	16
3	FW	(England)	24	Darius Henderson	7	0	2	2	11
4	MF	(England)	29	John Salako	6	0	0	0	6
4	MF	(England)	11	Andrew Hughes	6	0	0	0	6
6	DF	(England)	26	Alex Smith	2	1	0	0	3
6	MF	(England)	16	Phil Parkinson	2	0	1	0	3
6				Own goal	3	0	0	0	3
9	FW	(England)	9	Martin Butler	2	0	0	0	2
9	DF	(England)	23	John Mackie	2	0	0	0	2
9	MF	(England)	17	Neil Smith	1	0	0	1	2
12	MF	(England)	15	James Harper	1	0	0	0	1
12	DF	(Wales)	8	Ady Williams	1	0	0	0	1
12	MF	(England)	14	Sammy Igoe	1	0	0	0	1
12	DF	(England)	5	Adi Viveash	1	0	0	0	1
12	MF	(England)	6	Kevin Watson	1	0	0	0	1
12	MF	(Trinidad and Tobago)	7	Tony Rougier	1	0	0	0	1
TOTALS					70	1	4	3	78

=== Clean sheets ===
Place	Position	Nation	Number	Name	Division Two	FA Cup	League Cup	League Trophy	Total
1	GK	(England)	1	Phil Whitehead	15	1	2	0	18
2	GK	(United States)	31	Marcus Hahnemann	4	0	0	0	0
3	GK	(England)	31	Ben Roberts	3	0	0	0	0
TOTALS					22	1	2	0	18

=== Disciplinary record ===
Number	Nation	Position	Name	Division Two		FA Cup		League Cup		League Trophy		Total	
Number	Nation	Position	Name	Yellow card	Red card	Yellow card	Red card	Yellow card	Red card	Yellow card	Red card	Yellow card	Red card
2	(England)	DF	Graeme Murty	3	0	1	0	0	0	0	0	4	0
3	(England)	DF	Matthew Robinson	2	0	0	0	0	0	0	0	2	0
4	(England)	MF	Keith Jones	4	0	0	0	0	0	0	0	4	0
5	(England)	DF	Adi Viveash	2	0	0	0	0	0	0	0	2	0
6	(England)	MF	Kevin Watson	1	0	0	0	0	0	0	0	1	0
7	(Trinidad and Tobago)	MF	Tony Rougier	5	0	0	0	0	0	0	0	5	0
8	(Wales)	DF	Ady Williams	4	0	0	0	0	0	0	0	4	0
9	(England)	FW	Martin Butler	2	0	0	0	0	0	0	0	2	0
10	(England)	FW	Nicky Forster	6	0	0	0	0	0	0	0	6	0
11	(England)	MF	Andrew Hughes	3	0	0	0	0	0	0	0	3	0
12	(England)	FW	Jamie Cureton	1	0	0	0	0	0	0	0	1	0
14	(England)	MF	Sammy Igoe	6	1	0	0	0	0	0	0	6	1
15	(England)	MF	James Harper	3	0	0	0	0	0	0	0	3	0
16	(England)	MF	Phil Parkinson	13	1	0	0	1	0	0	0	14	1
17	(England)	MF	Neil Smith	0	0	1	0	0	0	1	0	2	0
18	(England)	DF	Adrian Whitbread	1	0	0	0	0	0	0	0	1	0
19	(Republic of Ireland)	MF	Joe Gamble	1	0	0	0	0	0	0	0	1	0
23	(England)	DF	John Mackie	3	0	0	0	0	0	0	0	3	0
24	(England)	FW	Darius Henderson	1	0	0	0	0	0	0	1	1	1
26	(England)	DF	Alex Smith	2	0	0	0	1	0	0	0	3	0
28	(England)	DF	Nicky Shorey	2	0	0	0	0	0	0	0	2	0
29	(England)	MF	John Salako	2	0	0	0	0	0	0	0	2	0
Players away on loan:
Players who left Reading during the season:
Total				67	2	2	0	2	0	1	1	72	3
