= Alec Smith (disambiguation) =

Alec Smith (1949–2006) was a Rhodesian farmer and army chaplain, the son of Prime Minister Ian Smith.

Alec Smith may also refer to:

- Alec Smith (footballer, born 1873) (1873–1908), Scottish footballer
- Alec Smith (footballer, born 1875) (1875–1954), Scottish footballer
- Alec Smith (trade unionist) (1930–2021), British trade unionist, former general secretary of the National Union of Tailors and Garment Workers

== See also ==
- Aleck C. Smith (fl. 1860s), justice of the Idaho Territorial Supreme Court
- Aleck Smith (1871–1919), American baseball catcher
- Alic Halford Smith (1883–1958), British philosopher and Vice-Chancellor of the University of Oxford
- Alex Smith (disambiguation)
- Alexander Smith (disambiguation)
- Rupert Alec-Smith (1913–1983), historian of East Yorkshire, England
