= Alexander Smith House =

Alexander Smith House may refer to:

- Alexander Smith House (Brentwood, Tennessee), listed on the National Register of Historic Places
- Alexander Smith House (Madison, Wisconsin), another historic house
