= Alex Smith (footballer, born 1976) =

English footballer (born 1976)

Personal information
- Full name: Alexander Philip Smith
- Date of birth: 15 February 1976 (age 50)
- Place of birth: Liverpool, England
- Height: 5 ft 9 in (1.75 m)
- Positions: Full-back; midfielder

Youth career
- 1994–1996: Everton

Senior career*
| Years | Team | Apps | (Gls) |
| 1996–1998 | Swindon Town | 31 | (1) |
| 1998 | → Huddersfield Town (loan) | 6 | (0) |
| 1998–1999 | Chester City | 32 | (2) |
| 1999–2001 | Port Vale | 58 | (2) |
| 2001–2003 | Reading | 14 | (2) |
| 2002–2003 | → Shrewsbury Town (loan) | 13 | (0) |
| 2003–2004 | Chester City | 20 | (4) |
| 2004–2006 | Wrexham | 44 | (0) |
| 2006–2007 | Southport | 10 | (1) |
| Total | | 228 | (12) |
- * Club domestic league appearances and goals

Alexander Philip Smith (born 15 February 1976) is an English former footballer who made 263 professional appearances in an eleven-year career. He played in either a creative midfield role or a full-back position.

A former Everton trainee, he started his career with Swindon Town in 1996. Two years later, he was loaned out to Huddersfield Town, and transferred to Chester City. An impressive season won him a move to Port Vale, where he lifted the Football League Trophy in 2001. He left the club later that year to sign with Reading, where he remained for two years. He spent time on loan at Shrewsbury Town but returned to Chester for their 2003–04 Conference National winning campaign. Following this, he moved on to Wrexham before a season with Southport in 2006–07.

== Career ==
Smith started his career as a trainee at Everton; he never made the first-team and was instead transferred to Swindon Town in January 1996. However, he was used mainly as a substitute in their Second Division winning 1995–96 season and in their subsequent First Division campaigns. In all, he made 31 appearances for Steve McMahon's "Robins", scoring his first senior goal in a 2–1 win over West Bromwich Albion at The Hawthorns on 8 February 1997. He enjoyed a two-month loan spell with Huddersfield Town in January 1998. He featured six times at the Galpharm Stadium under Peter Jackson. At the end of the 1997–98 season, he left the County Ground on a free transfer to Kevin Ratcliffe's Chester City. Within nine months at the Cheshire club, he had raised his profile after making some impressive performances during his 32 Third Division appearances in 1998–99.

Smith was purchased by Brian Horton's Port Vale in March 1999 for a fee of £75,000. He played eight games in the rest of the campaign, helping Vale to edge away from relegation, but only played 15 games in 1999–2000, as the "Valiants" were relegated to the third tier. He made 47 appearances in 2000–01, helping the club to lift the Football League Trophy in 2001 with a 2–1 victory over Brentford at the Millennium Stadium.

After this success he left Vale Park for Alan Pardew's Reading on a free transfer. He played 17 games in 2001–02, as the "Royals" won promotion as the Second Division's runners-up. He then found himself out of the first-team picture at the Madejski Stadium and spent December onwards of the 2002–03 season on loan at Shrewsbury Town, who were managed by his former boss Kevin Ratcliffe. He played 18 games for a "Shrews" side that were ultimately relegated out of the Third Division.

Now a free agent, he rejoined Chester in November 2003 and made twenty appearances in their Conference National topping season, thus helping Mark Wright's "Seals" back into the Football League. However, he left the Deva Stadium for rivals Wrexham, then in League One, in July 2004. He played 30 times for Denis Smith's "Dragons" in 2004–05, as the Welsh club were relegated into League Two after being deducted ten points for entering administration. He played 23 games in 2005–06, before leaving the Racecourse Ground to play for Southport in August 2006. He played ten games at Haig Avenue in the 2006–07 season, as the "Sandgrounders" were relegated out of the Conference National.

== Career statistics ==
Appearances and goals by club, season and competition
| Club | Season | League | | | FA Cup | | League Cup | | Other | | Total | |
| Club | Season | Division | Apps | Goals | Apps | Goals | Apps | Goals | Apps | Goals | Apps | Goals |
|---|---|---|---|---|---|---|---|---|---|---|---|---|
| Everton | 1994–95 | Premier League | 0 | 0 | 0 | 0 | 0 | 0 | — | | 0 | 0 |
| Everton | 1995–96 | Premier League | 0 | 0 | 0 | 0 | 0 | 0 | 0 | 0 | 0 | 0 |
| Everton | Total | | 0 | 0 | 0 | 0 | 0 | 0 | 0 | 0 | 0 | 0 |
| Swindon Town | 1995–96 | Second Division | 8 | 0 | 0 | 0 | — | | — | | 8 | 0 |
| Swindon Town | 1996–97 | First Division | 18 | 1 | 0 | 0 | 0 | 0 | 0 | 0 | 18 | 1 |
| Swindon Town | 1997–98 | First Division | 5 | 0 | 0 | 0 | 0 | 0 | 0 | 0 | 5 | 0 |
| Swindon Town | Total | | 31 | 1 | 0 | 0 | 0 | 0 | 0 | 0 | 31 | 1 |
| Huddersfield Town (loan) | 1997–98 | First Division | 6 | 0 | 0 | 0 | — | | — | | 6 | 0 |
| Chester City | 1998–99 | Third Division | 32 | 2 | 0 | 0 | 4 | 1 | 1 (Note: Appearance(s) in the EFL Trophy.) | 0 | 37 | 3 |
| Port Vale | 1998–99 | First Division | 8 | 0 | 0 | 0 | — | | — | | 8 | 0 |
| Port Vale | 1999–2000 | First Division | 13 | 0 | 0 | 0 | 2 | 0 | — | | 15 | 0 |
| Port Vale | 2000–01 | Second Division | 37 | 2 | 2 | 0 | 1 | 0 | 7 | 1 | 47 | 3 |
| Port Vale | Total | | 58 | 2 | 2 | 0 | 3 | 0 | 7 | 1 | 70 | 3 |
| Reading | 2001–02 | Second Division | 13 | 2 | 1 | 0 | 2 | 1 | 1 | 0 | 17 | 3 |
| Reading | 2002–03 | First Division | 1 | 0 | 0 | 0 | 0 | 0 | 0 | 0 | 1 | 0 |
| Reading | Total | | 14 | 2 | 1 | 0 | 2 | 1 | 1 | 0 | 18 | 3 |
| Shrewsbury Town (loan) | 2002–03 | Third Division | 13 | 0 | 2 | 0 | 0 | 0 | 3 | 0 | 18 | 0 |
| Chester City | 2003–04 | Conference National | 20 | 4 | 0 | 0 | — | | 0 | 0 | 20 | 4 |
| Wrexham | 2004–05 | League One | 24 | 0 | 1 | 0 | 2 | 0 | 3 | 0 | 30 | 0 |
| Wrexham | 2005–06 | League Two | 20 | 0 | 1 | 0 | 1 | 0 | 1 | 0 | 23 | 0 |
| Wrexham | Total | | 44 | 0 | 2 | 0 | 3 | 0 | 4 | 0 | 53 | 0 |
| Southport | 2006–07 | Conference National | 10 | 1 | 0 | 0 | — | | 0 | 0 | 10 | 1 |
| Career total | | | 228 | 12 | 7 | 0 | 12 | 2 | 16 | 1 | 263 | 15 |

== Honours ==
Swindon Town

- Football League Second Division: 1995–96

Port Vale

- Football League Trophy: 2000–01

Reading

- Football League Second Division second-place promotion: 2001–02

Chester City

- Conference National: 2003–04
