= Alec Smith (footballer, born 1873) =

Scottish footballer

Personal information
- Full name: Alexander Smith
- Date of birth: 7 November 1873
- Place of birth: Old Kilpatrick, Dunbartonshire, Scotland
- Date of death: January 1908 (aged 34)
- Positions: Inside right; left half

Senior career*
Years	Team	Apps	(Gls)
1893–1895	St Mirren	7	(1)
1895–1897	Lincoln City	45	(9)
1897–1898	Third Lanark	0	(0)
1898–1900	Swindon Town	52	(1)
1900–1903	Third Lanark	31	(0)
- * Club domestic league appearances and goals

Alexander Smith (7 November 1873 – January 1908) was a Scottish footballer who made 45 appearances in the Football League playing for Lincoln City. He played as an inside right or left half. He also played in his native Scotland for St Mirren and Third Lanark, and in the Southern League for Swindon Town.
