= Alex Smith (footballer, born 1944) =

English footballer

Personal information
- Full name: Robert Alexander Smith
- Date of birth: 6 February 1944 (age 82)
- Place of birth: Billingham, County Durham, England
- Position: Defender

Senior career*
Years	Team	Apps	(Gls)
1961–1972	Middlesbrough	121	(1)
1972–1974	Bangor City (player-manager)		
1974–1976	Darlington	43	(0)
- Guisborough Town (player-coach)
Total		164	(1)

Managerial career
- 1972–1974: Bangor City (player-manager)
- * Club domestic league appearances and goals

Robert Alexander Smith is the current kit manager at EFL Championship club Middlesbrough. He was previously a football player for several years with the same club and a player manager of Welsh club Bangor City.

An apprentice fitter before he became a footballer, Smith was on the books at Middlesbrough for four years before he made his first team debut. His debut came as a substitute in a 4–2 win over Bristol City in March 1966. He was in and out of the side for much of his career. He was transfer listed in May 1967 but stuck around, turning down a move to Blackburn Rovers in September 1971.

Smith eventually left Teesside in June 1972, becoming player-manager of Welsh side Bangor City. He returned to league football with Darlington in 1974.

He later fixed his sights on Non-League football, where his posts included a stint as player-coach with the Guisborough Town side that reached the FA Vase final, as well as being assistant to former Middlesbrough defender Peter Creamer at Evenwood Town in 1991. He later ran a sports shop, before returning to Middlesbrough during the 1996–97 season as their kit manager.
