= Sandy Smith =

Sandy Smith may refer to:

- Sandy Smith (hammer thrower) (1885–?), Scottish hammer thrower
- Sandy Smith (British Army officer) (1922–1993), British Army officer in World War II
- Sandy Smith (journalist) (fl. 1952–1986), American investigative journalist
- Sandy Smith (cricketer) (born 1945), Irish cricketer
- Sandy Smith (politician), American politician
- Sandy Smith (visual artist) (born 1983), Scottish visual artist

== See also ==
- Alexander Smith (disambiguation)
