= Alexander Smith (philosopher) =

19th-century Scottish philosopher

- Born: 12 June 1796; Banff, Scotland
- Died: 12 February 1851 (aged 54)

Academic background
- Education: University of Aberdeen
- Influences: William Paley, Thomas Reid

Academic work
- Era: 19th-century philosophy
- Discipline: Western philosophy
- School or tradition: Scottish Enlightenment
- Main interests: Moral philosophy, Western philosophy
- Notable ideas: Critique of sentimentalism, integration of moral realism and utilitarianism
- Influenced: New Intuitionists

Alexander Smith (12 June 1796 – 12 February 1851) was a Scottish philosopher and educator from Banff, Aberdeenshire. He is known for his contributions to moral philosophy and his work The Philosophy of Morals. Smith spent most of his life in Banff, with a period at the University of Aberdeen. He was also known as a musician and a member of the local literary society.

== Early life and education ==
Smith was born in Banff, Aberdeenshire, on 12 June 1796. He was educated in Banff, where he was recognised for his talents. Along with five other boys, he benefited from the education system in Banff.

Smith attended King's College, Aberdeen, graduating with an M.A. in 1814. He studied moral philosophy under Dr. William Jack.

== Career ==
After graduating, Smith worked as a parochial schoolmaster at Rothiemay and later at a private academy in Forres. In 1820, he received his ministerial license from the Presbytery of Fordyce. However, he did not pursue a ministerial career and instead taught English at Banff Academy until 1827, when his health declined. He subsequently became the local postmaster, a position he held until his death in 1851.

== Literary and philosophical contributions ==
In 1810, Smith, along with the other boys, established a literary society in Banff, which held meetings for the delivery of essays and discussions on literary subjects. The society's collection of books was gifted to the town library in 1899.

Smith's major philosophical work, The Philosophy of Morals, was published in 1835. Influenced by William Paley's theological utilitarian liberalism, Smith addressed issues in moral philosophy.

== Selected publications ==
- Smith, Alexander (January 1837). "Evangelical Preaching". Edinburgh Review.
- Smith, Alexander (1835). The Philosophy of Morals. Smith, Elder & Co.
- Smith, Alexander (January 1840). "Douglas on the Philosophy of Mind". Edinburgh Review.
- Smith, Alexander (April 1841). "Lieber's Political Ethics". Edinburgh Review.
- Smith, Alexander (January 1842). "Phrenological Ethics". Edinburgh Review.
- Smith, Alexander (December 1835). "The Philosophy of Poetry". Blackwood's Magazine.
