= Alexander Smith House (Madison, Wisconsin) =

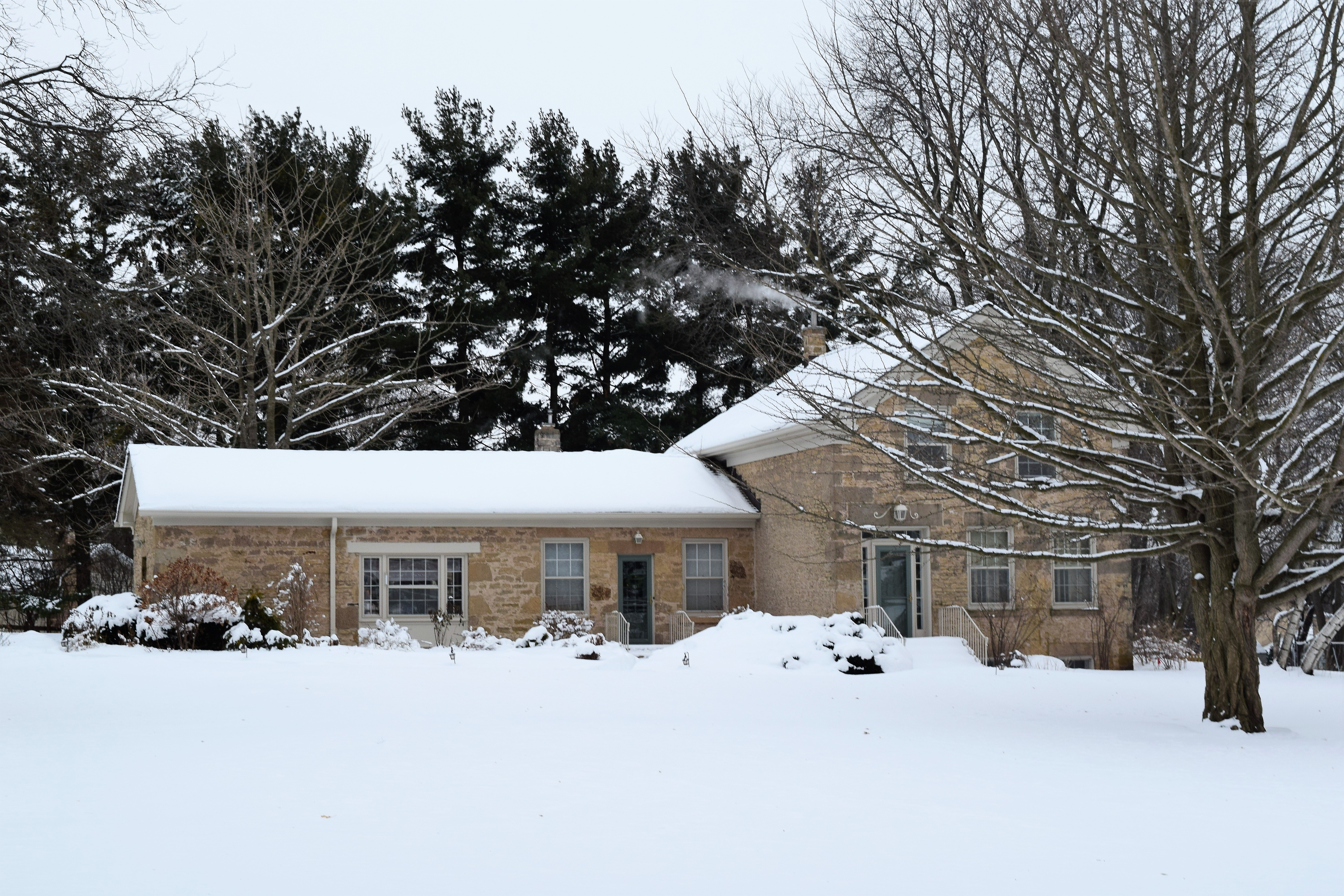
- Location: Madison, Wisconsin
- Coordinates: 43°05′55″N 89°17′27″W
- Built: 1848

The Alexander Smith House in Madison, Wisconsin was built in 1848 in Greek Revival style.

A historic marker at the house indicates it is Greek Revival in design, and that it served as a halfway house serving travelers between Milwaukee and Prairie de Chien.
