= Kevin Horlock =

Footballer (born 1972)

Personal information
- Date of birth: 1 November 1972 (age 54)
- Place of birth: Erith, England
- Height: 6 ft 0 in (1.83 m)
- Position: Midfielder

Team information
- Current team: Canvey Island (manager)

Youth career
- 1989–1991: West Ham United

Senior career*
Years	Team	Apps	(Gls)
1991–1992	West Ham United	0	(0)
1992–1997	Swindon Town	164	(22)
1997–2003	Manchester City	206	(39)
2003–2004	West Ham United	27	(1)
2004–2006	Ipswich Town	58	(0)
2006	→ Doncaster Rovers (loan)	13	(0)
2006–2008	Doncaster Rovers	2	(1)
2008	Scunthorpe United	0	(0)
2008	→ Mansfield Town (loan)	5	(0)
2008–2015	Needham Market	16	(1)
Total		491	(64)

International career
1995–2002	Northern Ireland	32	(0)

Managerial career
- 2015–2016: Chatham Town
- 2016–2018: Maldon & Tiptree
- 2020–2025: Needham Market
- 2025–2026: Maldon & Tiptree
- 2026–: Canvey Island
- * Club domestic league appearances and goals

Kevin Horlock (born 1 November 1972) is a football manager and former professional footballer. He is the manager of Canvey Island.

As a player he was a midfielder who notably played for Manchester City, for whom he played in three different divisions including the Premier League. He also played for Swindon Town, West Ham United, Ipswich Town, Doncaster Rovers and Mansfield Town. Horlock was well known for his accurate set pieces and is particularly skilled at taking free kicks. Born in England, Horlock was a Northern Ireland international, earning 32 caps.

As a manager he has previously coached non-league teams Chatham Town and Maldon & Tiptree. He has also coached at youth team level for Colchester United.

== Club career ==
=== Swindon Town ===
Horlock started his career as a trainee with West Ham United in 1989 but did not graduate to the first team and moved to Swindon Town in August 1992 where he spent a single season in the Premier League in 1993–94. Over the next few seasons he made his name as a versatile midfielder capable of playing on the left or in the centre, or at left-back. He also scored goals regularly, with 16 in the 1995–96 season. He made 200 appearances in all competitions, scoring 26 goals, in five seasons at Swindon before joining Manchester City in January 1997.

=== Manchester City ===
Horlock was Frank Clark's first signing for Manchester City for a transfer fee reported as being between £1.25 million and £1.5 million. He made his debut in a 4–1 Division One win against Oxford United and scored his first goal for Manchester City three weeks later against his former club Swindon. The following season, he was a regular in the first team until suffering an injury which sidelined him for four months. During Horlock's absence, Clark was sacked and chairman Francis Lee later observed that Horlock was one of only two good purchases Clark made. City were struggling at the foot of the table, and were relegated on the final day of the season despite a 5–2 win at Stoke City, in which Horlock scored the fifth goal. Horlock became Manchester City's primary penalty taker in the 1998–99 season, a role in which he continued for the next three seasons. Later that season Horlock was sent off in a match against AFC Bournemouth in unusual circumstances, receiving a second yellow card for "walking towards the referee in an aggressive manner while asking a question". Horlock's best season was probably the 2001–02 season where he was deployed in the holding midfield role and helped Manchester City earn promotion in stylish manner, the team scoring 108 goals. One of the most notable moments of his career was the 1999 season play-off final against Gillingham when he scored the first goal of the comeback when Manchester City won on penalties after being 2–0 down until the last five minutes of the game. Horlock wore the number 6 shirt Horlock made 232 league and cup appearances, scoring 44 goals, in seven years at Manchester City.

=== Later career ===
Horlock was signed by Glenn Roeder for West Ham United for a fee of £300,000 in August 2003. He made 27 league appearances for West Ham in the 2003–04 season and scored once against Wigan but fell out of favour with manager Alan Pardew and missed the play-offs games at the end of the season. He was given a free transfer to Ipswich Town in July 2004, where he made 58 league appearances before joining Doncaster Rovers on loan in February 2006 and being allowed to leave Ipswich at the end of the 2005–06 season. He joined Doncaster on a permanent two-year contract in May 2006 but missed the majority of the 2006–07 season due to a serious knee injury sustained in Doncaster's 3–1 victory over Crewe Alexandra in August 2006, a game in which he also scored his first goal for the club. A dislocated shoulder further restricted his opportunities, and in January 2008 his contract was cancelled by mutual consent. The next day, Horlock was signed by Scunthorpe United on a contract until the end of the season. However, he did not feature in the first team and joined Mansfield Town in March 2008 on loan until the end of the 2007–08 season. Horlock signed for Eastern Counties League Premier Division side Needham Market as player/assistant manager on a twelve-month contract on 8 August 2008.

== International career ==
Horlock was first capped in April 1995 versus Latvia and went on to make 32 appearances for Northern Ireland, before retiring from international football in 2003 for personal reasons. In August 2013 Horlock was appointed assistant manager of the Northern Ireland under 21 team.

== Managerial career ==
Horlock progressed through the coaching ranks at his former club Needham Market, where he had been assistant manager and had set up the club's academy in 2010. He left in 2015 when he was appointed as manager of Isthmian League Division One South side Chatham Town on 15 October 2015. Horlock combined both his Needham Market and Chatham Town roles with the assistant manager's job to the Northern Ireland under-21 team, a position he was appointed to in August 2013.

Horlock left Chatham on 1 May 2016 to concentrate on his coaching roles with Northern Ireland and Colchester United, having guided Chatham to a 19th-position finish in the league. Horlock had been coaching Colchester's under-18 side alongside Wayne Brown. He was named as Brown's assistant for the under-21 side following a number of coaching changes at the U's. This coincided with the announcement that Horlock would take charge of Maldon & Tiptree in the Isthmian League Division One North on 16 May, taking over from Steve Ball. He guided the Jammers to second position in the table, securing a place in the play-offs.

In May 2018, Horlock and Wayne Brown switched roles, with Horlock taking charge of Colchester's under-23 team and Brown taking the reins at Maldon & Tiptree.

On 20 June 2019, Horlock left Colchester to return to Needham Market as the club's new academy manager. In February 2020, he was appointed manager. Having led the club to the Southern Premier Division Central title in the 2023–24 season, he announced his resignation in February 2025 with the club sitting bottom of National League North.

On 5 February 2025, Horlock was appointed manager of Maldon & Tiptree, returning to the Isthmian League side after six-and-a-half years. After winning the North Division title, earning promotion to the Premier Division, Horlock stepped down as manager on 19 May 2026.

On 3 September 2026, Horlock was appointed manager at Canvey Island.

== Managerial statistics ==
As of match played 28 April 2018

Team	From	To	Record				
Team	From	To	G	W	D	L	Win %
Chatham Town	15 October 2015	1 May 2016	34	10	4	20	29.41
Maldon & Tiptree	16 May 2016	22 May 2018	109	56	14	39	51.38
Total			143	66	18	59	46.15

== Honours ==
Swindon Town

- Football League First Division play-offs: 1993
- Football League Second Division: 1995–96

Manchester City

- Football League First Division: 2001–02; runner-up: 1999–2000
- Football League Second Division play-offs: 1999

Individual

- Football League Championship Player of the Month: October 2004
