= Ty Gooden =

English footballer

Personal information
- Full name: Ty Gooden
- Date of birth: 23 October 1972 (age 54)
- Place of birth: Canvey Island, England
- Position: Midfielder

Senior career*
| Years | Team | Apps | (Gls) |
| 1989–1992 | Arsenal | 0 | (0) |
| 1992–1993 | Wycombe Wanderers | 0 | (0) |
| 1993–2000 | Swindon Town | 146 | (9) |
| 2000–2003 | Gillingham | 59 | (5) |
| 2003–2005 | Canvey Island | 3 | (0) |
| Total | | 208 | (14) |
- * Club domestic league appearances and goals

Ty Gooden (born 23 October 1972) is an English former professional footballer. Gooden, who played as a midfielder, featured for teams Arsenal, Wycombe Wanderers, Swindon Town, Gillingham and Canvey Island. He was the first player to be signed in the new millennium in all the British leagues, when he signed for Gillingham in 2000.

== Playing career ==
Gooden started his playing career at Arsenal, where he featured regularly for the club's academy teams. He then joined up with clubs Wycombe Wanderers, where he again failed to make a senior appearance.

Gooden then joined Swindon Town. He made 26 league appearances in the 1995–96 season which saw the Wiltshire side win the Division Two title.

Gooden was then signed by Gillingham manager Peter Taylor for £100,000, in a deal that saw Swindon teammate Iffy Onuora join the Kent club as well.

Later that year Gooden won promotion to the First Division with Gillingham, after they beat Wigan Athletic 3–2 in the Division Two play-off final at the old Wembley Stadium. During the game Gooden provided a cross to Andy Thomson for him to score the winning goal. He went on to have a successful first season in the First Division with Gillingham, helping them to finish 13th in the league. He also scored in an FA Cup tie against former club Arsenal, in a 5–2 defeat away at Highbury.

However, injury hampered the rest of his time at the Gills and, in 2003, he was sold to Canvey Island. In March 2004 he suffered a pull to his hamstring during Canvey's FA Trophy quarterfinal win over Maidenhead United. This injury thus ruled him out of the Gulls Essex derby and for three weeks altogether. Gooden then went on to earn a winners medal as the club won the 2004 Isthmian Premier League title.

== Scouting career ==
Gooden was the scout for Reading in Europe while based in France. Gooden eventually left Reading after they failed to gain promotion to the Premiership. He soon afterward linked up with Sunderland as their French scout. After a brief spell with the Black Cats, Gooden then signed a deal which saw him work as a scout for Arsenal firstly within Belgium and thereafter in France.

== Personal life ==
His brother, Ian, played for Canvey Island.

== Honours ==
Swindon Town

- Football League Second Division: 1995–96

Gillingham

- Football League Second Division play-offs: 2000

Canvey Island

- Isthmian Premier League: 2003–04
