= Alexander Smith House (Brentwood, Tennessee) =

Historic house in Tennessee, United States

- Smith, Alexander, House
- U.S. National Register of Historic Places
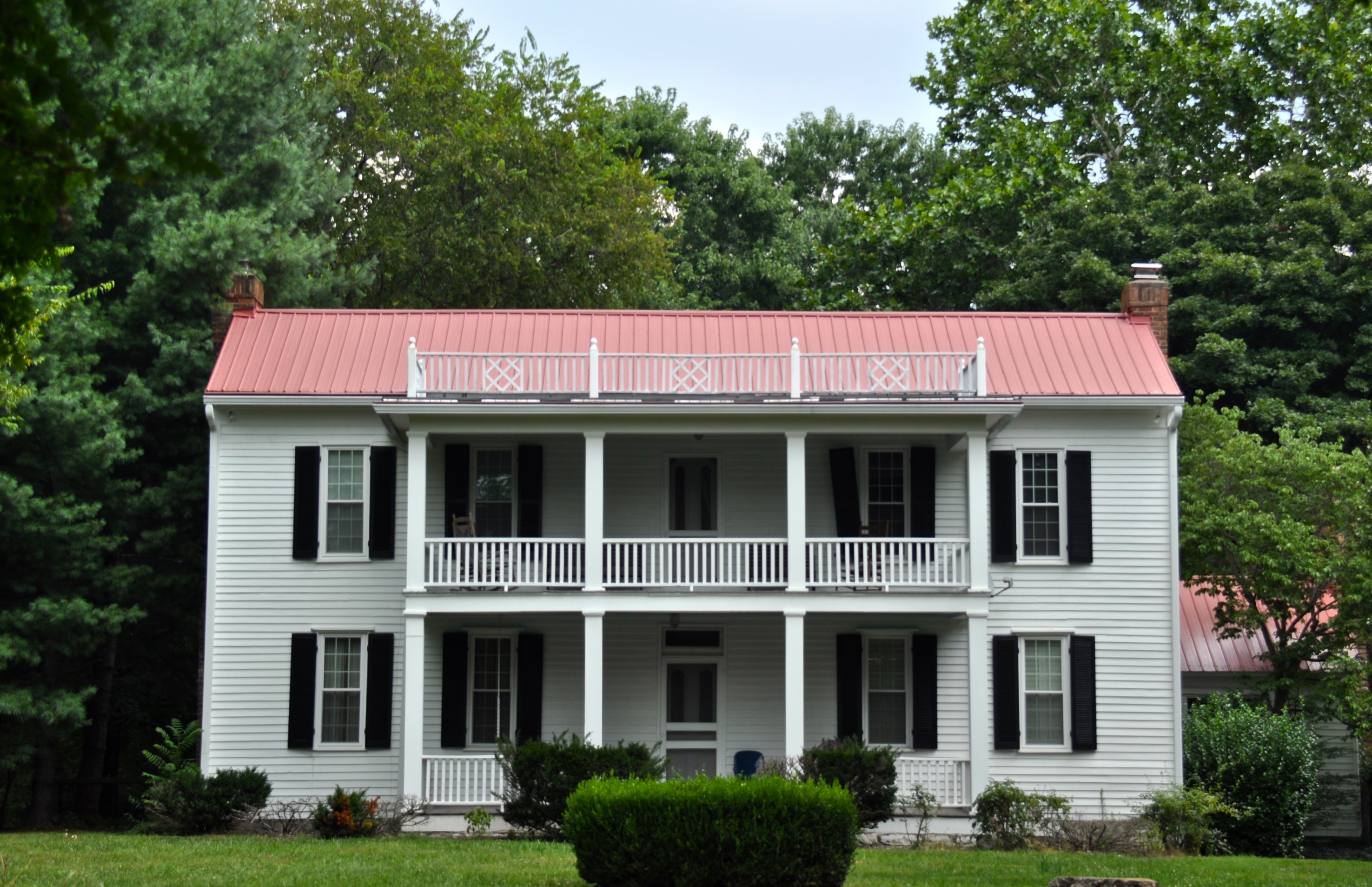
- Alexander Smith House, August 2014.

- Location within Tennessee Location within the United States
- Location: 1304 Wilson Pike, Brentwood, Tennessee
- Coordinates: 35°59′15″N 86°46′36″W
- Area: 3 acres (1.2 ha)
- Built: c.1800, 1812 and 1920
- Architectural style: Colonial Revival, I-house
- MPS: Williamson County MRA
- NRHP reference No.: 05000186
- Added to NRHP: March 17, 2005

The Alexander Smith House, also known as Twenty-four Trees, is a property in Brentwood, Tennessee that was listed on the National Register of Historic Places in 2005.

It was built or has other significance in c.1800, 1812, and 1920. It includes I-house and other architecture. When listed the property included one contributing building and three non-contributing buildings, on an area of 3 acres (1.2 ha).

The property was included in a 1988 study of Williamson County historical resources.
