= Alexander Howland Smith =

Scottish document forger (1859-1913)

Alexander Howland Smith (16 March 1859 – 3 May 1913), also known as the "Antique Smith", was a Scottish document forger in the 1880s. His forgeries still surface today.

== Methods ==
Howland Smith began his forging career in the 1880s in his native Edinburgh. At first, he began to visit second hand bookshops and bought all kinds of old books with blank fly leaves. He always carried them home himself, a habit that some bookshop owners thought unusual, since the books were old and heavy. When these materials ran out, he resorted to modern paper.

Smith began to sell his forgeries in 1886 and continued for the next five years. He sold them to bookshops, auctions and pawnshops, usually at modest prices.

Smith forged manuscripts from various historical people, such as Mary, Queen of Scots; Oliver Cromwell; and Sir Walter Scott. Smith forged the signatures without tracing the originals. He created poems, autographs and historical letters. He made the documents appear old by dipping them in weak tea.

Afterwards experts said that the forgeries were very clumsy and should have not deceived anyone. Letters were dated wrongly, sometimes after the death of their supposed writer, and had been written on modern paper with new writing implements.

== Rillbank collection ==
In May 1891 manuscript collector James Mackenzie decided to sell some of the letters of his Rillbank Collection by auction in Edinburgh. Before the start of the auction, the auctioneer stated that some people had claimed that the items were forgeries and refused to personally vouch for them, which significantly decreased the prices.

Three months later Mackenzie published one old letter, supposedly from the poet Robert Burns, in the Cumnock Express newspaper. One reader of the paper found out that the person the letter had been addressed to, weaver John Hill, had never existed and begun to suspect the authenticity of the whole collection. Colvill Scott of Surrey, historical document expert, also announced that there were dozens of letter forgeries all over Scotland.

Mackenzie answered by publishing two unpublished poems purporting to be by Burns in the paper. Another reader noticed that one of them, The Poor Man's Prayer, had been published when Burns had been only a child and was the work of William Hayward Roberts, who had also written the other poem.

When Mackenzie was asked how he had acquired the letters, he claimed that he had found them in a secret drawer in an old cabinet. Contemporaries did not believe him. He had probably bought all of them in Edinburgh and it is unclear whether he knew them to be forgeries or not. He was not charged with anything.

== Unraveling begins ==
In November 1892 the Edinburgh Evening Despatch published articles about the forgeries, including facsimiles of some of the notes that had been with the letters. One reader recognized the handwriting of a clerk he knew as Alexander Howland Smith. Smith had been working in various law offices in Edinburgh and dealt in ephemera and old documents.

When police questioned Smith, he said that he had been employed as a chief clerk of the lawyer Thomas Henry Ferrie, who had asked him to get rid of old documents in the cellars of his law office. Smith had taken them home, found them to be valuable and begun to sell them. When the supply had run out, he had begun to create new forgeries. He claimed that he could create any kind of document. Smith was arrested.

== Trial and sentence ==
On 26 June 1893 Smith's trial begun in the High Court of Justiciary. He was not charged with forgery but selling the forgeries under false pretences. One of the witnesses was a bookseller Bristo Brown, who had bought large number of Smith's letters and said that he had believed them to be genuine.

The jury convicted Smith but recommended leniency and he was sentenced to 12 months in prison.

The exact amount of Smith's forgeries is unknown. They were widely sold in the British Isles and abroad and are still occasionally sold as real in the British Isles and the USA.
