= Alexander Smith (businessman) =

British business executive

Alexander W. Smith is a business executive and chairman of The Vitamin Shoppe. He was formerly CEO of Pier 1 Imports.

He was educated at the University of East Anglia (BSc). He has served as Group President of the TJX Companies, Inc. He was instrumental in the development of the TK Maxx stores in Great Britain and ran its international operations. He was also a director of Papa John's. He was president and CEO of Pier 1 Imports from February 2007 to December 2016.
