= Mark Robinson (footballer, born 1968) =

English footballer

Personal information
- Date of birth: 21 November 1968 (age 57)
- Place of birth: Manchester, England
- Position: Defender

Youth career
- 1984–1986: West Bromwich Albion

Senior career*
Years	Team	Apps	(Gls)
1986–1987	West Bromwich Albion	3	(0)
1987–1993	Barnsley	137	(4)
1993–1994	Newcastle United	25	(0)
1994–2002	Swindon Town	271	(6)
2002–2003	Chippenham Town	?	(?)
- * Club domestic league appearances and goals as of 09:30, 18 September 2012 (UTC)

Mark Robinson (born 21 November 1968 in Manchester, England) is an English former footballer who played as a full back for English clubs West Bromwich Albion, Barnsley, Newcastle United, Swindon Town and Chippenham Town.

== Career ==
Robinson started his career with Midlands-based outfit West Brom where he made only 2 league outings before a move to Barnsley.

Robinson played over 150 games for the Tykes becoming a firm fans favourite. This then led to Kevin Keegan paying £450,000 to take the defender to Newcastle United, March 1993. Robinson helped the Magpies secure promotion to the Premier League later that season.

In July 1993 he suffered a broken leg in a tackle by a Hartlepool player in a preseason match, and Keegan said "we came to Hartlepool to help the club out financially, and we've ended up with a player fighting to save his career". Kevin Keegan also once said he would never return to Hartlepool's Victoria Park after a pre-season friendly went wrong.

He was signed for a substantial amount by Keegan to bolster the defence, but was never the same player after the game at Hartlepool. He lost a lot of pace, which was his major strength.

Robinson made only 16 appearances during Newcastle's return to the top flight and in the summer of 1994 Swindon Town paid £600,000 for his services.

Robinson spent the rest of his professional career at the Wiltshire outfit playing 316 matches - scoring 4 times. Robinson was voted the 32nd all-time best Swindon Town player to pull on the red shirt.

After injuries plagued him during the 2001–02 season Robinson retired from professional football and joined nearby Chippenham Town.

== Personal life ==
He has 3 sons called Elliot, Harry and Bailey, and a daughter called Lucy.

== Honours ==
Swindon Town

- Football League Second Division: 1995–96
