= Steve Finney =

English footballer (1973–2022)

Personal information
- Full name: Stephen Kenneth Finney
- Date of birth: 31 October 1973
- Place of birth: Hexham, England
- Date of death: 2 February 2022 (aged 48)
- Height: 5 ft 10 in (1.78 m)
- Position: Striker

Youth career
- 1990–1992: Preston North End

Senior career*
Years	Team	Apps	(Gls)
1992–1993	Preston North End	6	(1)
1993–1995	Manchester City	0	(0)
1995–1998	Swindon Town	73	(18)
1997	→ Cambridge United (loan)	7	(2)
1998–1999	Carlisle United	33	(6)
1999	Leyton Orient	5	(0)
1999	Barrow	10	(1)
1999–2000	Chester City	22	(0)
2000–2002	Altrincham		
- * Club domestic league appearances and goals

Stephen Kenneth Finney (31 October 1973 – 2 February 2022) was an English professional footballer who played as a forward. He made appearances in The Football League for six clubs.

== Playing career ==
Finney began his career as an apprentice with Preston North End, where he made his professional debut during 1991–92. After just six league appearances he moved to Premier League side Manchester City in February 1993, but he failed to make the first team while at Maine Road.

In the summer of 1995, Finney moved to Swindon Town, scoring 12 times in his first season to help them to the Division Two title. Apart from a loan spell with Cambridge United in 1997, Finney remained with Swindon until July 1998, when he moved to Carlisle United. But before the 1998–99 season had finished, Finney had moved on to Leyton Orient for a short spell with the London club.

Finney spent time on trial with Exeter City in the summer of 1999, and then dropped into non–league football with Barrow before returning to The Football League with struggling Chester City on 18 October 1999 after sending his CV to the club. During his 14-month stint at the club, he failed to score a competitive goal and was part of the side that were relegated to the Football Conference. In December 2000 he joined Altrincham, initially on loan. He scored a hat–trick against Whitby Town in his third game for the club. He scored 11 goals in 24 games during his initial loan spell with the club. Following his release from Chester, he made a single cup appearance for Altrincham before his release.

== Personal life and death ==
Following his retirement from football, Finney worked as a car salesman and business development manager. He also coached Ullswater United in the Westmorland League.

He died on 2 February 2022, at the age of 48.

== Honours ==
Swindon Town

- Football League Second Division: 1995–96
