= Steve Cowe =

English footballer

Personal information
- Full name: Steven Mark Cowe
- Date of birth: 29 September 1974 (age 52)
- Place of birth: Gloucester, England
- Position: Forward

Youth career
- Aston Villa

Senior career*
Years	Team	Apps	(Gls)
1993–1996	Aston Villa	0	(0)
1996–2001	Swindon Town	97	(11)
1999	→ Hereford United (loan)	14	(2)
2001–2003	Newport County	50	(4)
2002–2003	→ Forest Green Rovers (loan)	17	(3)
2003–2004	Forest Green Rovers	40	(6)
2004	Redditch United	0	(0)
2004–2005	Weston-super-Mare	22	(3)
2005–2007	Cirencester Town	69	(5)
2007–2009	Cinderford Town		
- * Club domestic league appearances and goals

Steven Mark Cowe (born 29 September 1974) is an English footballer who played in the Football League as a forward for Swindon Town. He began his career with Aston Villa, but never played for their first team, and went on to play for numerous non-league teams. He retired from football in 2009.
