= Lee Collins (footballer, born 1974) =

Scottish footballer

Personal information
- Full name: Lee Collins
- Date of birth: 3 February 1974 (age 52)
- Place of birth: Bellshill, Scotland
- Position: Midfielder

Youth career
- 1992–1993: Possil United, Celtic Boys Club, Partick Thistle.

Senior career*
| Years | Team | Apps | (Gls) |
| 1993–1995 | Albion Rovers | 45 | (1) |
| 1995–2000 | Swindon Town | 64 | (2) |
| 2000–2003 | Blackpool | 66 | (2) |
| 2003 | → Morecambe (loan) | 6 | (0) |
| 2003–2004 | Morecambe | 12 | (1) |
| 2004–2006 | Stenhousemuir | 30 | (4) |
| Total | | 223 | (10) |
- * Club domestic league appearances and goals

Lee Collins (born 3 February 1974 in Bellshill, North Lanarkshire) is a Scottish former professional footballer.

== Professional career ==
Collins began his professional career in his native land with Albion Rovers. After two years, 45 league appearances, and one goal for the club, he moved south of the border to join English club Swindon Town. He remained at the County Ground for five years, making 64 appearances and scoring two goals. He won the Division Two championship with them in 1995–96.

In 2000, Steve McMahon, Collins' former manager at Swindon, signed him for Blackpool. Collins remained at Bloomfield Road for three years, making 66 appearances and scoring two goals. He won promotion via the Division Three play-offs in his first season with the club. In 2002 he started the final as Blackpool won the 2001–02 Football League Trophy.

In 2003, he was loaned to non-league Morecambe, and he went on to make the move permanent after negotiating a pay-off deal with Blackpool chairman Karl Oyston.

Collins returned to Scotland in 2004 with Stenhousemuir. He remained with the club for two years.

== Honours ==
Swindon Town

- Football League Second Division: 1995–96

Blackpool

- Division Three play-offs: 2001
- Football League Trophy: 2001–02
