= Frank Talia =

Australian soccer player

Personal information
- Full name: Francesco Talia
- Date of birth: 20 July 1972 (age 54)
- Place of birth: Melbourne, Australia
- Height: 1.85 m (6 ft 1 in)
- Position: Goalkeeper

Youth career
- 1988–1990: Sunshine George Cross

Senior career*
Years	Team	Apps	(Gls)
1990–1992	Sunshine George Cross	11	(0)
1992–1995	Blackburn Rovers	0	(0)
1992	→ Hartlepool United (loan)	14	(0)
1995–2000	Swindon Town	107	(0)
2000	Wolverhampton Wanderers	0	(0)
2000–2001	Sheffield United	6	(0)
2001–2002	Royal Antwerp	3	(0)
2002	Reading	0	(0)
2002–2007	Wycombe Wanderers	132	(0)
Total		273	(0)
- * Club domestic league appearances and goals

Francesco "Frank" Talia (born 20 July 1972 in Melbourne) is an Australian former professional soccer goalkeeper, who last played for Wycombe Wanderers in Football League Two.

== Career ==
=== Early career ===
He was an Australian Institute of Sport scholarship holder from 1989 to 1990. Talia began his career at Australian club Sunshine Georgies before moving to Blackburn Rovers in August 1992.

Although he was at the club for three years, Talia did not make any first-team appearances for Blackburn and following this he moved to Swindon Town in September 1995 after a loan spell at Hartlepool United.

For a while, he was Blackburn's second choice goalkeeper behind Bobby Mimms before the arrival of Tim Flowers in November 1993, and had been issued with the number 13 shirt with the introduction of squad numbers for the 1993-94 season in the FA Premier League. He made several appearances as a non-playing substitute, the last at Wembley Stadium in August 1995 when he watched from the bench as Blackburn (Premier League champions) were beaten 1–0 by Everton in the FA Charity Shield.

Talia made over 100 appearances in five years at Swindon Town winning the player of the year award in 2000 before moving to Sheffield United in September 2000, where he made six appearances.

In March 2002, Talia signed a short-term contract with English Division 2 side Reading, sitting on the bench for the final six games of the season.

=== Wycombe ===
Lawrie Sanchez signed Talia for Wycombe in August 2002 on a free transfer as cover for regular Wycombe goalkeeper Martin Taylor. His chance came against Bristol City after Taylor developed a back problem and he continued in goal after Taylor gashed his knee at the Wycombe's training ground. Talia then made over 100 appearances for the club, despite being sidelined when he sliced his toe with a lawn-mower in 2004 and a knee injury that side-lined him for six months in August 2006.

== Honours ==
Swindon Town

- Football League Second Division: 1995–96
