= 1995–96 Football League =

97th season of the Football League

The Football League
- Season: 1995–96
- Champions: Sunderland
- Promoted: Sunderland; Derby County; Leicester City

The 1995–96 Football League season was the 97th completed season of The Football League. It was contested through three divisions, the First Division, Second Division and Third Division.

== First Division ==
First Division
- Season: 1995-1996
- Champions: Sunderland
- Promoted: Sunderland; Derby County; Leicester City
- Relegated: Millwall; Watford; Luton Town
- Matches: 552
- Goals: 1,417 (2.57 per match)
- Top goalscorer: John Aldridge (27 goals)
- Biggest home win: Sunderland 6–0 Millwall (9 December 1995)
- Biggest away win: Barnsley 0–5 Birmingham City (2 September 1995)
- Highest scoring: Watford 6–3 Grimsby Town (23 April 1996)

The Division One promotion race was one of the most dramatic seen at this level in many years.

Sunderland, who frequently topped the table after overcoming the previous leaders Millwall 6-0 at Roker Park in early December, clinched the Division One title in their first full season under the management of Peter Reid, five years after last playing among the elite in the old First Division. Derby County, who had been relegated alongside them that year, followed the Wearsiders into the Premier League as Division One runners-up, giving their new manager Jim Smith the fifth promotion of his managerial career. Crystal Palace finished third in the final table a season after relegation and a mere three months after their new manager Dave Bassett had taken over the club when they were in 16th place. Stoke City finished fourth as they mounted their first serious attempt to regain the top flight place which they had last held in 1985. Leicester City finished fifth after an erratic season, which had seen manager Mark McGhee defect to Wolves before Christmas to be succeeded by Martin O'Neill, who had been manager of Norwich City for just six months when he accepted the offer to take charge at Filbert Street. The final playoff place was occupied by Charlton Athletic, whose manager Alan Curbishley was now in sole charge after being joint manager alongside Steve Gritt for his first four seasons. The playoff final saw Crystal Palace take the lead in the first half before Garry Parker equalised for Leicester, and the game went into extra time. With just seconds remaining, new signing Steve Claridge clinched the winner for Leicester, who secured the third and final promotion place.

Things turned out very differently during the second half of the season for a number of clubs who had looked like promotion contenders in the first half of the campaign. West Bromwich Albion had been near the top of the table in October, before going on a 14-match winless run from which they picked up one point out of a possible 42 and dropped into the relegation zone. Improved form after ending their winless run in February lifted them up to a secure mid-table finish, but it was scant consolation for what might have been. Their local rivals Birmingham City had looked like promotion contenders halfway through the season, but faded away to finish 15th - a slump which cost manager Barry Fry his job after three seasons in charge, and sparked the return of legendary former player Trevor Francis to the club as manager. Norwich City had been in the promotion race when they lost manager Martin O'Neill to Leicester just before Christmas, but they were unable to sustain their promotion challenge under new manager Gary Megson, who was replaced at the end of the season by Mike Walker - the man who had turned them into Premier League title contenders and UEFA Cup competitors a few seasons earlier. Millwall had been top of Division One in early December when they were knocked off the top by a Sunderland side who beat them 6-0 at Roker Park. Manager Mick McCarthy left to take charge of the Republic of Ireland in February, and the slide down the table continued under his successor Jimmy Nicholl, culminating in relegation on the final day of the season.

Joining Millwall in Division Two for 1996-97 were Luton Town and Watford, who had both spent most of the season in the bottom three despite mid-season managerial changes. Following the departure of David Pleat to Sheffield Wednesday in the summer of 1995, Luton had appointed coach Terry Westley as manager, only to replace him with the Bradford City manager Lennie Lawrence just before Christmas. Watford were bottom of the table when they sacked Glenn Roeder as manager in February, and then turned to Graham Taylor for his second spell in charge at Vicarage Road, three months after his resignation at Wolves.

Wolves, one of the pre-season promotion favourites, failed to deliver the goods in the league and were heading towards the relegation zone when manager Graham Taylor resigned in November. The month-long search for a new manager ended with the appointment of Leicester City's Mark McGhee, who turned his back on a promotion challenge to help ensure that Wolves avoided relegation and prepared for a promotion push in 1996-97.

As well as managerial changes, relocation was another key theme of the 1995-96 campaign in Division One. Sunderland moved ahead with plans to leave Roker Park in favour of a new all-seater stadium at Monkwearmouth, due for completion in the summer of 1997. Having previously settled on revamping the Baseball Ground, Derby County chairman Lionel Pickering announced in February that the club would be relocating to Pride Park, with work beginning on the new stadium over the coming months and that the new stadium would be ready in time for the 1997-98 season. Stoke City, who had played at the Victoria Ground for almost 120 years, announced that they would be moving to a new 28,000-seater stadium at Trentham Lakes at the same time. Reading were pressing on with plans to relocate to a new 25,000-seater stadium by the end of the decade.

Pos	Team	Pld	W	D	L	GF	GA	GD	Pts	Qualification or relegation
1	Sunderland (C, P)	46	22	17	7	59	33	+26	83	Promotion to the Premier League
2	Derby County (P)	46	21	16	9	71	51	+20	79	Promotion to the Premier League
3	Crystal Palace	46	20	15	11	67	48	+19	75	Qualification for the First Division play-offs
4	Stoke City	46	20	13	13	60	49	+11	73	Qualification for the First Division play-offs
5	Leicester City (O, P)	46	19	14	13	66	60	+6	71	Qualification for the First Division play-offs
6	Charlton Athletic	46	17	20	9	57	45	+12	71	Qualification for the First Division play-offs
7	Ipswich Town	46	19	12	15	79	69	+10	69	
8	Huddersfield Town	46	17	12	17	61	58	+3	63	
9	Sheffield United	46	16	14	16	57	54	+3	62	
10	Barnsley	46	14	18	14	60	66	−6	60	
11	West Bromwich Albion	46	16	12	18	60	68	−8	60	
12	Port Vale	46	15	15	16	59	66	−7	60	
13	Tranmere Rovers	46	14	17	15	64	60	+4	59	
14	Southend United	46	15	14	17	52	61	−9	59	
15	Birmingham City	46	15	13	18	61	64	−3	58	
16	Norwich City	46	14	15	17	59	55	+4	57	
17	Grimsby Town	46	14	14	18	55	69	−14	56	
18	Oldham Athletic	46	14	14	18	54	50	+4	56	
19	Reading	46	13	17	16	54	63	−9	56	
20	Wolverhampton Wanderers	46	13	16	17	56	62	−6	55	
21	Portsmouth	46	13	13	20	61	69	−8	52	
22	Millwall (R)	46	13	13	20	43	63	−20	52	Relegation to the Second Division
23	Watford (R)	46	10	18	18	62	70	−8	48	Relegation to the Second Division
24	Luton Town (R)	46	11	12	23	40	64	−24	45	Relegation to the Second Division

Rules for classification: 1) Points; 2) Goals scored; 3) Goal difference
(C) Champions; (O) Play-off winners; (P) Promoted; (R) Relegated

=== Play-offs ===
Semifinals; 1st leg – May 12; 2nd leg – May 15, 1996
3rd	Crystal Palace	2	1	3
6th	Charlton Athletic	1	0	1
4th	Stoke City	0	0	0
5th	Leicester City	0	1	1

Final at Wembley; May 27, 1996
3rd	Crystal Palace	1
5th	Leicester City (a.e.t.)	2

=== Results ===
Home \ Away	BAR	BIR	CHA	CRY	DER	GRI	HUD	IPS	LEI	LUT	MIL	NWC	OLD	PTV	POR	REA	SHU	STD	STK	SUN	TRA	WAT	WBA	WOL
Barnsley		0–5	1–2	1–1	2–0	1–1	3–0	3–3	2–2	1–0	3–1	2–2	2–1	1–1	0–0	0–1	2–2	1–1	3–1	0–1	2–1	2–1	1–1	1–0
Birmingham City	0–0		3–4	0–0	1–4	3–1	2–0	3–1	2–2	4–0	2–2	3–1	0–0	3–1	2–0	1–2	0–1	2–0	1–1	0–2	1–0	1–0	1–1	2–0
Charlton Athletic	1–1	3–1		0–0	0–0	0–1	2–1	0–2	0–1	1–1	2–0	1–1	1–1	2–2	2–1	2–1	1–1	0–3	2–1	1–1	0–0	2–1	4–1	1–1
Crystal Palace	4–3	3–2	1–1		0–0	5–0	0–0	1–1	0–1	2–0	1–2	0–1	2–2	2–2	0–0	0–2	0–0	2–0	1–1	0–1	2–1	4–0	1–0	3–2
Derby County	4–1	1–1	2–0	2–1		1–1	3–2	1–1	0–1	1–1	2–2	2–1	2–1	0–0	3–2	3–0	4–2	1–0	3–1	3–1	6–2	1–1	3–0	0–0
Grimsby Town	3–1	2–1	1–2	0–2	1–1		1–1	3–1	2–2	0–0	1–2	2–2	1–1	1–0	2–1	0–0	0–2	1–1	1–0	0–4	1–1	0–0	1–0	3–0
Huddersfield Town	3–0	4–2	2–2	3–0	0–1	1–3		2–1	3–1	1–0	3–0	3–2	0–0	0–2	0–1	3–1	1–2	3–1	1–1	1–1	1–0	1–0	4–1	2–1
Ipswich Town	2–2	2–0	1–5	1–0	1–0	2–2	2–1		4–2	0–1	0–0	2–1	2–1	5–1	3–2	1–2	1–1	1–1	4–1	3–0	1–2	4–2	2–1	1–2
Leicester City	2–2	3–0	1–1	2–3	0–0	2–1	2–1	0–2		1–1	2–1	3–2	2–0	1–1	4–2	1–1	0–2	1–3	2–3	0–0	0–1	1–0	1–2	1–0
Luton Town	1–3	0–0	0–1	0–0	1–2	3–2	2–2	1–2	1–1		1–0	1–3	1–1	3–2	3–1	1–2	1–0	3–1	1–2	0–2	3–2	0–0	1–2	2–3
Millwall	0–1	2–0	0–2	1–4	0–1	2–1	0–0	2–1	1–1	1–0		2–1	0–1	1–2	1–1	1–1	1–0	0–0	2–3	1–2	2–2	1–2	2–1	0–1
Norwich City	3–1	1–1	0–1	1–0	1–0	2–2	2–0	2–1	0–1	0–1	0–0		2–1	2–1	1–1	3–3	0–0	0–1	0–1	0–0	1–1	1–2	2–2	2–3
Oldham Athletic	0–1	4–0	1–1	3–1	0–1	1–0	3–0	1–1	3–1	1–0	2–2	2–0		2–2	1–1	2–1	2–1	0–1	2–0	1–2	1–2	0–0	1–2	0–0
Port Vale	3–0	1–2	1–3	1–2	1–1	1–0	1–0	2–1	0–2	1–0	0–1	1–0	1–3		0–2	3–2	2–3	2–1	1–0	1–1	1–1	1–1	3–1	2–2
Portsmouth	0–0	0–1	2–1	2–3	2–2	3–1	1–1	0–1	2–1	4–0	0–1	1–0	2–1	1–2		0–0	1–2	4–2	3–3	2–2	0–2	4–2	0–2	0–2
Reading	0–0	0–1	0–0	0–2	3–2	0–2	3–1	1–4	1–1	3–1	1–2	0–3	2–0	2–2	0–1		0–3	3–3	1–0	1–1	1–0	0–0	3–1	3–0
Sheffield United	1–0	1–1	2–0	2–3	0–2	1–2	0–2	2–2	1–3	1–0	2–0	2–1	2–1	1–1	4–1	0–0		3–0	0–0	0–0	0–2	1–1	1–2	2–1
Southend United	0–0	3–1	1–1	1–1	1–2	1–0	0–0	2–1	2–1	0–1	2–0	1–1	1–1	2–1	2–1	0–0	2–1		2–4	0–2	2–0	1–1	2–1	2–1
Stoke City	2–0	1–0	1–0	1–2	1–1	1–2	1–1	3–1	1–0	5–0	1–0	1–1	0–1	0–1	2–1	1–1	2–2	1–0		1–0	0–0	2–0	2–1	2–0
Sunderland	2–1	3–0	0–0	1–0	3–0	1–0	3–2	1–0	1–2	1–0	6–0	0–1	1–0	0–0	1–1	2–2	2–0	1–0	0–0		0–0	1–1	0–0	2–0
Tranmere Rovers	1–3	2–2	0–0	2–3	5–1	0–1	3–1	5–2	1–1	1–0	2–2	1–1	2–0	2–1	1–2	2–1	1–1	3–0	0–0	2–0		2–3	2–2	2–2
Watford	2–3	1–1	1–2	0–0	0–0	6–3	0–1	2–3	0–1	1–1	0–1	0–2	2–1	5–2	1–2	4–2	2–1	2–2	3–0	3–3	3–0		1–1	1–1
West Bromwich Albion	2–1	1–0	1–0	2–3	3–2	3–1	1–2	0–0	2–3	0–2	1–0	1–4	1–0	1–1	2–1	2–0	3–1	3–1	0–1	0–1	1–1	4–4		0–0
Wolverhampton Wanderers	2–2	3–2	0–0	0–2	3–0	4–1	0–0	2–2	2–3	0–0	1–1	0–2	1–3	0–1	2–2	1–1	1–0	2–0	1–4	3–0	2–1	3–0	1–1	

Legend: Blue = home team win; Yellow = draw; Red = away team win.

=== Top scorers ===
Rank	Player	Club	Goals
1	(Republic of Ireland) John Aldridge	Tranmere Rovers	27
2	(Scotland) Dougie Freedman	Crystal Palace	20
=	(England) Dean Sturridge	Derby County	20
4	(England) Ian Marshall	Ipswich Town	19
=	(Wales) Iwan Roberts	Leicester City	19
6	(Scotland) Alex Mathie	Ipswich Town	18
7	(England) Andy Payton	Barnsley	17
=	(England) Bob Taylor	West Bromwich Albion	17

=== Locations ===
Locations of the First Division teams
Locations of the First Division London teams

=== Attendances ===
#	Club	Average
1	Wolverhampton Wanderers	24,786
2	Birmingham City	18,090
3	Sunderland	17,482
4	Leicester City	16,530
5	Crystal Palace	15,248
6	West Bromwich Albion	15,061
7	Norwich City	14,581
8	Derby County	14,327
9	Huddersfield Town	13,151
10	Sheffield United	12,901
11	Ipswich Town	12,604
12	Stoke City	12,275
13	Charlton Athletic	11,185
14	Millwall	9,571
15	Watford	9,457
16	Portsmouth	9,406
17	Reading	8,918
18	Port Vale	8,227
19	Barnsley	8,086
20	Tranmere Rovers	7,861
21	Luton Town	7,223
22	Oldham Athletic	6,634
23	Grimsby Town	5,992
24	Southend United	5,898

== Second Division ==
Following back-to-back relegations, Swindon Town took a turn in the right direction by sealing the Division Two title with 92 points and securing a return to Division One in their first full season under manager Steve McMahon. They were joined in promotion by their local rivals Oxford United, who finished runners-up. The final promotion place was won by Bradford City, who won at Wembley for the first time in their history with a 2-0 triumph over Notts County in the playoff final. Crewe Alexandra were beaten in the semi-finals for a second successive season. Blackpool finished third and were also beaten in the playoff semi-finals, which was quickly followed by the dismissal of manager Sam Allardyce despite having come closer than any other Blackpool manager to regaining the second tier place which Blackpool had last held in 1978.

Down at the bottom end of the table, Hull City dropped into the fourth tier for the first time in more than a decade, having won just five league games all season. Debt-ridden Brighton, whose chairman Bill Archer came under fire from fans over his plans to sell the Goldstone Ground and groundshare with another club, went down in 23rd place. Swansea City went down after being managed by four different men in the same season, with Liverpool legend Jan Molby taking over as player-manager before relegation was confirmed in hope of bringing some long-awaited success to the South Wales side. Carlisle United's disappointing return to the third tier of the English league ended in instant relegation as they occupied the fourth and final relegation place.

York City, who avoided relegation at Carlisle’s expense, made headlines in the autumn with a surprising 3-0 win over Manchester United—who would go on to finish the season as Premier League champions and FA Cup winners—in the first leg of the League Cup second round. This was the only competitive home defeat United suffered all season. Despite a 3-1 win at Bootham Crescent in the return leg, United were eliminated from the competition, marking a notable upset under Alex Ferguson.

Football League, Second Division
- Season: 1995–96
- Champions: Swindon Town (1st third tier title)
- Direct promotion: Swindon Town, Oxford United
- Promoted through play-offs: Bradford City
- Relegated: Brighton & Hove Albion, Carlisle United, Hull City, Swansea City
- Matches: 552
- Goals: 1,414 (2.56 per match)
- Top goalscorer: Marcus Stewart (Bristol Rovers), 21; Gary Martindale (Peterborough United/ Notts County), 21

Pos	Team	Pld	W	D	L	GF	GA	GD	Pts	Promotion or relegation
1	Swindon Town (C, P)	46	25	17	4	71	34	+37	92	Promotion to the First Division
2	Oxford United (P)	46	24	11	11	76	39	+37	83	Promotion to the First Division
3	Blackpool	46	23	13	10	67	40	+27	82	Qualification for the Second Division play-offs
4	Notts County	46	21	15	10	63	39	+24	78	Qualification for the Second Division play-offs
5	Crewe Alexandra	46	22	7	17	77	60	+17	73	Qualification for the Second Division play-offs
6	Bradford City (O, P)	46	22	7	17	71	69	+2	73	Qualification for the Second Division play-offs
7	Chesterfield	46	20	12	14	56	51	+5	72	
8	Wrexham	46	18	16	12	76	55	+21	70	
9	Stockport County	46	19	13	14	61	47	+14	70	
10	Bristol Rovers	46	20	10	16	57	60	−3	70	
11	Walsall	46	19	12	15	60	45	+15	69	
12	Wycombe Wanderers	46	15	15	16	63	59	+4	60	
13	Bristol City	46	15	15	16	55	60	−5	60	
14	Bournemouth	46	16	10	20	51	70	−19	58	
15	Brentford	46	15	13	18	43	49	−6	58	
16	Rotherham United	46	14	14	18	54	62	−8	56	
17	Burnley	46	14	13	19	56	68	−12	55	
18	Shrewsbury Town	46	13	14	19	58	70	−12	53	
19	Peterborough United	46	13	13	20	59	66	−7	52	
20	York City	46	13	13	20	58	73	−15	52	
21	Carlisle United (R)	46	12	13	21	57	72	−15	49	Relegation to the Third Division
22	Swansea City (R)	46	11	14	21	43	79	−36	47	Relegation to the Third Division
23	Brighton & Hove Albion (R)	46	10	10	26	46	69	−23	40	Relegation to the Third Division
24	Hull City (R)	46	5	16	25	36	78	−42	31	Relegation to the Third Division

(C) Champions; (O) Play-off winners; (P) Promoted; (R) Relegated

=== Play-offs ===
Semifinals; 1st leg –May 12; 2nd leg –May 15, 1996
3rd	Blackpool	2	0	2
6th	Bradford City	0	3	3
4th	Notts County	2	1	3
5th	Crewe Alexandra	2	0	2

Final at Wembley Stadium; May 26, 1996
4th	Notts County	0
6th	Bradford City	2

=== Results ===
Home \ Away	BOU	BLP	BRA	BRE	B&HA	BRI	BRR	BUR	CRL	CHF	CRE	HUL	NTC	OXF	PET	ROT	SHR	STP	SWA	SWI	WAL	WRE	WYC	YOR
AFC Bournemouth		1–0	3–1	1–0	3–1	1–1	2–1	0–2	2–0	2–0	0–4	2–0	0–2	0–1	3–0	2–1	0–2	3–2	3–1	0–0	0–0	1–1	2–3	2–2
Blackpool	2–1		4–1	1–0	2–1	3–0	3–0	3–1	3–1	0–0	2–1	1–1	1–0	1–1	2–1	1–2	2–1	0–1	4–0	1–1	1–2	2–0	1–1	1–3
Bradford City	1–0	2–1		2–1	1–3	3–0	2–3	2–2	3–1	2–1	2–1	1–1	1–0	1–0	2–1	2–0	3–1	0–1	5–1	1–1	1–0	2–0	0–4	2–2
Brentford	2–0	1–2	2–1		0–1	2–2	0–0	1–0	1–1	1–2	2–1	1–0	0–0	1–0	3–0	1–1	0–2	1–0	0–0	0–2	1–0	1–0	1–0	2–0
Brighton & Hove Albion	2–0	1–2	0–0	0–0		0–2	2–0	1–0	1–0	0–2	2–2	4–0	1–0	1–2	1–2	1–1	2–2	1–1	0–2	1–3	0–3	2–2	1–2	1–3
Bristol City	3–0	1–1	2–1	0–0	0–1		0–2	0–1	1–1	2–1	3–2	4–0	0–2	0–2	0–1	4–3	2–0	1–0	1–0	0–0	0–2	3–1	0–0	1–1
Bristol Rovers	0–2	1–1	1–0	2–0	1–0	2–4		1–0	1–1	1–0	1–2	2–1	0–3	2–0	1–1	1–0	2–1	1–3	2–2	1–4	2–0	1–2	2–1	1–0
Burnley	0–0	0–1	2–3	1–0	3–0	0–0	0–1		2–0	2–2	0–1	2–1	3–4	0–2	2–1	2–1	2–1	4–3	3–0	0–0	1–1	2–2	1–1	3–3
Carlisle United	4–0	1–2	2–2	2–1	1–0	2–1	1–2	2–0		1–1	1–0	2–0	0–0	1–2	1–1	2–0	1–1	0–1	3–0	0–1	1–1	1–2	4–2	2–0
Chesterfield	3–0	1–0	2–1	2–2	1–0	1–1	2–1	4–2	3–0		1–2	0–0	1–0	1–0	1–1	3–0	1–0	1–2	3–2	1–3	1–1	1–1	3–1	2–1
Crewe Alexandra	2–0	1–2	1–2	3–1	3–1	4–2	1–2	3–1	2–1	3–0		1–0	2–2	1–2	2–1	0–2	3–0	0–1	4–1	0–2	1–0	0–0	2–0	1–1
Hull City	1–1	2–1	2–3	0–1	0–0	2–3	1–3	3–0	2–5	0–0	1–2		0–0	0–0	2–3	1–4	2–3	1–1	0–0	0–1	1–0	1–1	4–2	0–3
Notts County	2–0	1–1	0–2	4–0	2–1	2–2	4–2	1–1	3–1	4–1	0–1	1–0		1–1	1–0	2–1	1–1	1–0	4–0	1–3	2–1	1–0	2–0	2–2
Oxford United	2–0	1–0	2–0	2–1	1–1	2–0	1–2	5–0	4–0	1–0	1–0	2–0	1–1		4–0	1–1	6–0	2–1	5–1	3–0	3–2	0–0	1–4	2–0
Peterborough United	4–5	0–0	3–1	0–1	3–1	1–1	0–0	0–2	6–1	0–1	3–1	3–1	0–1	1–1		1–0	2–2	0–1	1–1	0–2	2–3	1–0	3–0	6–1
Rotherham United	1–0	2–1	2–0	1–0	1–0	2–3	1–0	1–0	2–2	0–1	2–2	1–1	2–0	1–0	5–1		2–2	2–0	1–1	0–2	0–1	0–1	0–0	2–2
Shrewsbury Town	1–2	0–2	1–1	2–1	2–1	4–1	1–1	3–0	1–1	0–0	2–3	1–1	0–1	2–0	1–1	3–1		1–2	1–2	1–2	0–2	2–2	1–1	2–1
Stockport County	3–1	1–1	1–2	1–1	3–1	0–0	2–0	0–0	2–0	0–1	1–1	0–0	2–0	4–2	0–1	1–1	0–2		2–0	1–1	0–1	2–3	1–1	3–0
Swansea City	1–1	0–2	2–0	2–1	2–1	2–1	2–2	2–4	1–1	3–2	2–1	0–0	0–0	1–1	0–0	0–0	3–1	0–3		0–1	2–1	1–3	1–2	0–1
Swindon Town	2–2	1–1	4–1	2–2	3–2	2–0	2–1	0–0	2–1	1–1	2–1	3–0	1–0	1–1	2–0	1–0	0–1	0–0	3–0		1–1	1–1	0–0	3–0
Walsall	0–0	1–1	2–1	0–1	2–1	2–1	1–1	3–1	2–1	3–0	3–2	3–0	0–0	2–2	1–1	3–1	3–0	0–2	4–1	0–0		1–2	0–1	2–0
Wrexham	5–0	1–1	1–2	2–2	1–1	0–0	3–2	0–2	3–2	3–0	2–3	5–0	1–1	2–1	1–0	7–0	1–1	2–3	1–0	4–3	3–0		1–0	2–3
Wycombe Wanderers	1–2	0–1	5–2	2–1	0–2	1–1	1–1	4–1	4–0	1–0	1–1	2–2	1–1	0–3	1–1	1–1	2–0	4–1	0–1	1–2	1–0	1–1		2–1
York City	3–1	0–2	0–3	2–2	3–1	0–1	0–1	1–1	1–1	0–1	2–3	0–1	1–3	1–0	3–1	2–2	1–2	2–2	0–0	2–0	1–0	1–0	2–1	

Legend: Blue = home team win; Yellow = draw; Red = away team win.

=== Top scorers ===
Rank	Player	Club(s)	Goals
1	(England) Marcus Stewart	Bristol Rovers	21
=	(England) Gary Martindale	Peterborough United; Notts County	21

=== Locations ===
Locations of the Second Division teams

== Third Division ==
Under a new owner and a new manager, Preston North End sealed promotion from Division Three as champions following two successive playoff failures. Gillingham, another club with a new owner and a new manager, sealed promotion as runners-up after seven seasons in the league's basement division. Bury clinched the final automatic promotion place following a mid-season change of manager from Mike Walsh to Stan Ternent. In the playoffs, Neil Warnock clinched his fourth promotion in seven seasons as manager, guiding Plymouth Argyle to promotion in his first full season in charge at Home Park with a 1-0 win over Darlington at Wembley. Hereford United and Colchester United were the losing semi-finalists in the playoffs.

A disastrous season for Torquay United saw the Devon club finish well adrift of 23rd placed Scarborough at the foot of the Division Three table, being confined to the bottom place with several games to spare, but their Football League status was saved when Stevenage Borough - whose Broadhall Way stadium did not meet Football League requirements - were crowned Conference champions. The club's future was then secured with a takeover by new chairman Mike Bateson, who replaced Eddie May with Kevin Hodges as the manager at Plainmoor. May's old club Cardiff City finished 22nd in the table - the lowest final position in the Ninian Park side's history. Fulham, another side once more familiar with the higher divisions of the league, finished a lowly 17th in the table, and prepared for a better campaign in 1996-97 by appointing veteran defender Micky Adams as player-manager following Ian Branfoot's move to the role of general manager.

As with a number of clubs in the higher divisions, relocation was on the cards at a number of Division Three clubs by this season. New Wigan Athletic owner Dave Whelan was looking to move the club away from their outdated home at Springfield Park to an all-seater stadium elsewhere, while Plymouth Argyle were considering leaving Home Park for a new 25,000-seat stadium at nearby Central Park.

Two Division Three clubs were hit by major tragedy in the 1995-96 season. Wigan Athletic defender Mike Millett, who had just broken into the first team, was killed in a car crash the day before his 18th birthday. Alan Nicholls, the 22-year-old former Plymouth Argyle and England under-21 goalkeeper who was on loan with Conference side Stalybridge Celtic from Gillingham, was killed in a motorbike crash near Peterborough in November, along with the brother of former Gillingham player Scott Lindsey.

Football League, Third Division
- Season: 1995–96
- Champions: Preston North End (1st fourth tier title)
- Direct promotion: Preston North End, Bury, Gillingham
- Promoted through play-offs: Plymouth Argyle
- Relegated to Conference: None
- Matches: 552
- Goals: 1,346 (2.44 per match)
- Top goalscorer: Steve White (Hereford United), 29; Andy Saville (Preston North End), 29

Pos	Team	Pld	W	D	L	GF	GA	GD	Pts	Promotion
1	Preston North End (C, P)	46	23	17	6	78	38	+40	86	Promotion to the Second Division
2	Gillingham (P)	46	22	17	7	49	20	+29	83	Promotion to the Second Division
3	Bury (P)	46	22	13	11	66	48	+18	79	Promotion to the Second Division
4	Plymouth Argyle (O, P)	46	22	12	12	68	49	+19	78	Qualification for the Third Division play-offs
5	Darlington	46	20	18	8	60	42	+18	78	Qualification for the Third Division play-offs
6	Hereford United	46	20	14	12	65	47	+18	74	Qualification for the Third Division play-offs
7	Colchester United	46	18	18	10	61	51	+10	72	Qualification for the Third Division play-offs
8	Chester City	46	18	16	12	72	53	+19	70	
9	Barnet	46	18	16	12	65	45	+20	70	
10	Wigan Athletic	46	20	10	16	62	56	+6	70	
11	Northampton Town	46	18	13	15	51	44	+7	67	
12	Scunthorpe United	46	15	15	16	67	61	+6	60	
13	Doncaster Rovers	46	16	11	19	49	60	−11	59	
14	Exeter City	46	13	18	15	46	53	−7	57	
15	Rochdale	46	14	13	19	57	61	−4	55	
16	Cambridge United	46	14	12	20	61	71	−10	54	
17	Fulham	46	12	17	17	57	63	−6	53	
18	Lincoln City	46	13	14	19	57	73	−16	53	
19	Mansfield Town	46	11	20	15	54	64	−10	53	
20	Hartlepool United	46	12	13	21	47	67	−20	49	
21	Leyton Orient	46	12	11	23	44	63	−19	47	
22	Cardiff City	46	11	12	23	41	64	−23	45	
23	Scarborough	46	8	16	22	39	69	−30	40	
24	Torquay United	46	5	14	27	30	84	−54	29	Reprived from relegation

(C) Champions; (O) Play-off winners; (P) Promoted

=== Play-offs ===
Semifinals; 1st leg – May 12; 2nd leg – May 15, 1996
4th	Plymouth Argyle	0	3	3
7th	Colchester United	1	1	2
5th	Darlington	2	2	4
6th	Hereford United	1	1	2

Final at Wembley Stadium; May 25, 1996
4th	Plymouth Argyle	1
5th	Darlington	0

=== Results ===
Home \ Away	BAR	BRY	CAM	CAR	CHE	COL	DAR	DON	EXE	FUL	GIL	HAR	HER	LEY	LIN	MAN	NOR	PLY	PNE	ROC	SCA	SCU	TOR	WIG
Barnet		0–0	2–0	1–0	1–1	1–1	1–1	1–1	3–2	3–0	0–2	5–1	1–3	3–0	3–1	0–0	2–0	1–2	1–0	0–4	1–0	1–0	4–0	5–0
Bury	0–0		1–2	3–0	1–1	0–0	0–0	4–1	2–0	3–0	1–0	0–3	2–0	2–1	7–1	0–2	0–1	0–5	0–0	1–1	0–2	3–0	1–0	2–1
Cambridge United	1–1	2–4		4–2	1–1	3–1	0–1	2–2	1–1	0–0	0–0	0–1	2–2	2–0	2–1	0–2	0–1	2–3	2–1	2–1	4–1	1–2	1–1	2–1
Cardiff City	1–1	0–1	1–1		0–0	1–2	0–2	3–2	0–1	1–4	2–0	2–0	3–2	0–0	1–1	3–0	0–1	0–1	0–1	1–0	2–1	0–1	0–0	3–0
Chester City	0–2	1–1	1–1	4–0		1–1	4–1	0–3	2–2	1–1	1–1	2–0	2–1	1–1	5–1	2–1	1–0	3–1	1–1	1–2	5–0	3–0	4–1	0–0
Colchester United	3–2	1–0	2–1	1–0	1–2		1–1	1–0	1–1	2–2	1–1	4–1	2–0	0–0	3–0	1–3	1–0	2–1	2–2	1–0	1–1	2–1	3–1	1–2
Darlington	1–1	4–0	0–0	0–1	3–1	2–2		1–2	1–0	1–1	1–0	1–0	1–0	2–0	3–2	1–1	1–2	2–0	1–2	0–1	1–2	0–0	1–2	2–1
Doncaster Rovers	1–0	0–1	2–1	0–0	1–2	3–2	1–2		2–0	0–2	0–1	1–0	0–0	4–1	1–1	0–0	1–0	0–0	2–2	0–3	1–0	2–0	1–0	2–1
Exeter City	1–0	1–1	1–0	2–0	1–2	2–2	0–1	1–0		2–1	0–0	1–0	0–2	2–2	1–1	2–2	1–2	1–1	1–1	2–0	2–0	1–0	0–0	0–4
Fulham	1–1	0–0	0–2	4–2	2–0	1–1	2–2	3–1	2–1		0–0	2–2	0–0	2–1	1–2	4–2	1–3	4–0	2–2	1–1	1–0	1–3	4–0	1–0
Gillingham	1–0	3–0	3–0	1–0	3–1	0–1	0–0	4–0	1–0	1–0		2–0	1–1	1–1	2–0	2–0	0–0	1–0	1–1	1–0	1–0	0–0	2–0	2–1
Hartlepool United	0–0	1–2	1–2	2–1	2–1	2–1	1–1	0–1	0–0	1–0	1–1		0–1	4–1	3–0	1–1	2–1	2–2	0–2	1–1	1–1	2–0	2–2	1–2
Hereford United	4–1	3–4	5–2	1–3	1–0	1–1	0–1	1–0	2–2	1–0	0–0	4–1		3–2	1–0	0–1	1–0	3–0	0–1	2–0	0–0	3–0	2–1	2–2
Leyton Orient	3–3	0–2	3–1	4–1	0–2	0–1	1–1	3–1	0–3	1–0	0–1	4–1	0–1		2–0	1–0	2–0	0–1	0–2	2–0	1–0	0–0	1–0	1–1
Lincoln City	1–2	2–2	1–3	0–1	0–0	0–0	0–2	4–0	0–1	4–0	0–3	1–1	2–1	1–0		2–1	1–0	0–0	0–0	1–2	3–1	2–2	5–0	2–4
Mansfield Town	2–1	1–5	2–1	1–1	3–4	1–2	2–2	0–0	1–1	1–0	0–1	0–3	1–2	0–0	1–2		0–0	1–1	0–0	2–2	2–0	1–1	2–0	1–0
Northampton Town	0–2	4–1	3–0	1–0	1–0	2–1	1–1	3–3	0–0	2–0	1–1	0–0	1–1	1–2	1–1	3–3		1–0	1–2	2–1	2–0	1–2	1–1	0–0
Plymouth Argyle	1–1	1–0	1–0	0–0	4–2	1–1	0–1	3–1	2–2	3–0	1–0	3–0	0–1	1–1	3–0	1–0	1–0		0–2	2–0	5–1	1–3	4–3	3–1
Preston North End	0–1	0–0	3–3	5–0	2–0	2–0	1–1	1–0	2–0	1–1	0–0	3–0	2–2	4–0	1–2	6–0	0–3	3–2		1–2	3–2	2–2	1–0	1–1
Rochdale	0–4	1–1	3–1	3–3	1–3	1–1	1–2	1–0	4–2	1–1	2–0	4–0	0–0	1–0	3–3	1–1	1–2	0–1	0–3		0–2	1–1	3–0	0–2
Scarborough	1–1	0–2	2–0	1–0	0–0	0–0	1–2	0–2	0–0	2–2	0–2	1–2	2–2	2–1	0–0	1–1	2–1	2–2	1–2	1–1		1–4	2–1	0–0
Scunthorpe United	2–0	1–2	1–2	1–1	0–2	1–0	3–3	2–2	4–0	3–1	1–1	2–1	0–1	2–0	2–3	1–1	0–0	1–1	1–2	1–3	3–3		1–0	3–1
Torquay United	1–1	0–2	0–3	0–0	1–1	2–3	0–1	1–2	0–2	2–1	0–0	0–0	1–1	2–1	0–2	1–1	3–0	0–2	0–4	1–0	0–0	1–8		1–1
Wigan Athletic	1–0	1–2	3–1	3–1	2–1	2–0	1–1	2–0	1–0	1–1	2–1	1–0	2–1	1–0	1–1	2–6	1–2	0–1	0–1	2–0	2–0	2–1	3–0	

Legend: Blue = home team win; Yellow = draw; Red = away team win.

=== Top scorers ===
Rank	Player	Club	Goals
1	(England) Steve White	Hereford United	29
=	(England) Andy Saville	Preston North End	29

=== Locations ===
Locations of the Third Division teams
Locations of the Third Division London teams
