= Matthew Heywood =

English footballer

Personal information
- Full name: Matthew Stephen Heywood
- Date of birth: 26 August 1979 (age 47)
- Place of birth: Chatham, Kent, England
- Height: 6 ft 2 in (1.88 m)
- Position: Defender

Youth career
- –1998: Burnley

Senior career*
| Years | Team | Apps | (Gls) |
| 1998–2001 | Burnley | 13 | (0) |
| 2001–2005 | Swindon Town | 183 | (8) |
| 2005–2006 | Bristol City | 24 | (2) |
| 2006–2008 | Brentford | 60 | (2) |
| 2008–2010 | Grimsby Town | 19 | (0) |
| 2010 | Barrow | 0 | (0) |
| 2010–2011 | Buxton | 9 | (0) |
| Total | | 309 | (12) |
- * Club domestic league appearances and goals

Matthew Stephen Heywood (born 26 August 1979) is an English former professional footballer who played as a defender from 1997 until 2011.

Having started his career at Burnley as a trainee he signed professional terms in 1997. In 2001 after failing to establish himself a first-team player he left to join Swindon Town where his career took off, becoming an established centre half for four years before moving on to Bristol City in 2005. A year later he joined Brentford and in 2008 following his final season at the club he was awarded the supporters player of the season award for the 2007–08 season. He then joined Grimsby Town who were the last professional club he was to play for inside the Football League before he was released in 2010 and briefly joined Barrow on a short-term deal. He finished his career in non-League football with a 6-month stay at Buxton.

== Career ==
=== Burnley ===
Heywood started his career at Burnley in the summer of 1997, when he was promoted from the club's youth team. He was nurtured into first-team action at Turf Moor under the stewardship of Adrian Heath, and finally made his full professional debut in a league tie at home against York City. He came on at half time to replace veteran defender Steve Blatherwick in the game that was eventually lost 1–0. In total Heywood went on to make 15 appearances in all competitions in his stay at the club, which came to an end midway through the 2000–01 season, when he transferred to Swindon Town in January 2001, on a free transfer.

=== Swindon Town ===
He made his Swindon debut in a 3–0 victory over Bury a few days later and managed to score his first senior goal during a victory over Brentford, in which Heywood's goal was the only one of the game. Heywood went on to cement himself as a regular centre back for Swindon, and played over 200 times for the club from between 2001 and 2004. In the 2003–04 season, he was part of the team that was defeated in the Second Division play-offs.

=== Bristol City ===
In the summer of 2005, Heywood joined League One rivals Bristol City on a free transfer. He was signed by manager Brian Tinnion, however he was soon sacked, and replaced by Gary Johnson. Heywood was originally one of the first choice defenders at Ashton Gate but fell out of contention in the first team, due to some injury problems he sustained. At the close of the 2005–2006 season, Heywood was released by City.

=== Brentford ===
He joined Brentford on 27 July 2006 in a one-month loan deal. The transfer was made permanent on 18 August 2006 and he became club captain in January 2008, following the departure of John Mackie. Brentford struggled under new manager Leroy Rosenior and he was eventually dismissed before being replaced by Scott Fitzgerald, and then later Barry Quinn. Heywood and his new club eventually lost their League One status after finishing bottom of the league. This was Heywood's first taste of relegation. In the 2007–2008 season, Brentford finished 14th in the League Two table, with Heywood winning the "Supporters Player of the Season" award.

=== Grimsby Town ===
On 25 June 2008, Heywood turned down a fresh contract at Griffin Park, and signed a two-year contract with Grimsby Town. He was named Grimsby's club captain for the 2008–09 season by his new manager Alan Buckley, but the Mariners began to struggle in the league, and Buckley was dismissed early on into the new campaign. Following increasingly worrying poor performances from Heywood, Buckley's replacement as manager, Mike Newell opted to re-sign former Grimsby centre back Rob Atkinson to replace Matt in defence. The club captaincy was also given to youngster Ryan Bennett. Heywood would only make 18 appearances for Grimsby in his first season and spent a good chunk of that sat on the substitutes bench. During the 2009–10 season, Heywood continued to struggle in the sense of finding any way into the first-team, and failed to even make the bench on a regular basis, even under the club's new manager Neil Woods. On 13 January 2010, Woods told Heywood, along with Danny Boshell, Barry Conlon and Jamie Clarke that they were free to leave the club in the January transfer window, this following Heywood only featuring once in the season, playing in a 4–0 away defeat against Port Vale in September 2009. On 1 February 2010, Heywood along with Clarke and Boshell were released from the club.

=== Barrow and Buxton ===
Heywood began training with Mansfield Town on 15 February. He did not sign for them, however, and remained a free agent until July 2010, when he signed for Barrow.

On 11 October 2010, Heywood was released from the club having failed to make a single appearance for them. Heywood signed for Buxton on 25 October 2010, after 9 appearances during the 2010–11 season he left the club in May 2011.

== Career statistics ==
Appearances and goals by club, season and competition
| Club | Season | League | | | FA Cup | | League Cup | | Other | | Total | |
| Club | Season | Division | Apps | Goals | Apps | Goals | Apps | Goals | Apps | Goals | Apps | Goals |
|---|---|---|---|---|---|---|---|---|---|---|---|---|
| Burnley | 1998–99 | Second Division | 13 | 0 | 1 | 0 | 1 | 0 | 0 | 0 | 15 | 0 |
| Burnley | 2000–01 | First Division | 0 | 0 | 0 | 0 | 0 | 0 | ― | | 0 | 0 |
| Burnley | Total | | 13 | 0 | 1 | 0 | 1 | 0 | 0 | 0 | 15 | 0 |
| Swindon Town | 2000–01 | Second Division | 21 | 2 | ― | | ― | | 2 (Note: Appearances in Football League Trophy) | 0 | 23 | 2 |
| Swindon Town | 2001–02 | Second Division | 44 | 3 | 3 | 1 | 2 | 0 | 1 | 0 | 50 | 4 |
| Swindon Town | 2002–03 | Second Division | 45 | 1 | 2 | 0 | 1 | 0 | 2 | 1 | 50 | 1 |
| Swindon Town | 2003–04 | Second Division | 43 | 1 | 1 | 0 | 2 | 0 | 2 (Note: Appearances in Second Division play-offs) | 0 | 45 | 1 |
| Swindon Town | 2004–05 | League One | 31 | 1 | 3 | 0 | 1 | 0 | 3 | 0 | 38 | 1 |
| Swindon Town | Total | | 184 | 8 | 9 | 1 | 6 | 0 | 10 | 1 | 206 | 10 |
| Bristol City | 2005–06 | League One | 23 | 1 | 1 | 0 | 0 | 0 | 0 | 0 | 24 | 1 |
| Brentford | 2006–07 | League One | 28 | 1 | 0 | 0 | 2 | 0 | 2 | 0 | 32 | 1 |
| Brentford | 2007–08 | League Two | 32 | 1 | 2 | 0 | 0 | 0 | 1 | 0 | 35 | 1 |
| Brentford | Total | | 60 | 2 | 2 | 0 | 2 | 0 | 3 | 0 | 67 | 2 |
| Grimsby Town | 2008–09 | League Two | 19 | 0 | 0 | 0 | 2 | 0 | 2 | 0 | 23 | 0 |
| Grimsby Town | 2009–10 | League Two | 1 | 0 | 0 | 0 | 0 | 0 | 0 | 0 | 1 | 0 |
| Grimsby Town | Total | | 20 | 0 | 0 | 0 | 2 | 0 | 2 | 0 | 24 | 0 |
| Career total | | | 300 | 12 | 13 | 1 | 10 | 0 | 16 | 1 | 336 | 14 |

== Honours ==
Burnley

- Football League Second Division second-place promotion: 1998–99

Individual

- Swindon Town Player of the Year: 2001–02
- Brentford Supporters Player of the Year: 2007–08
