= James Milner =

English footballer (born 1986)

James Milner MBE
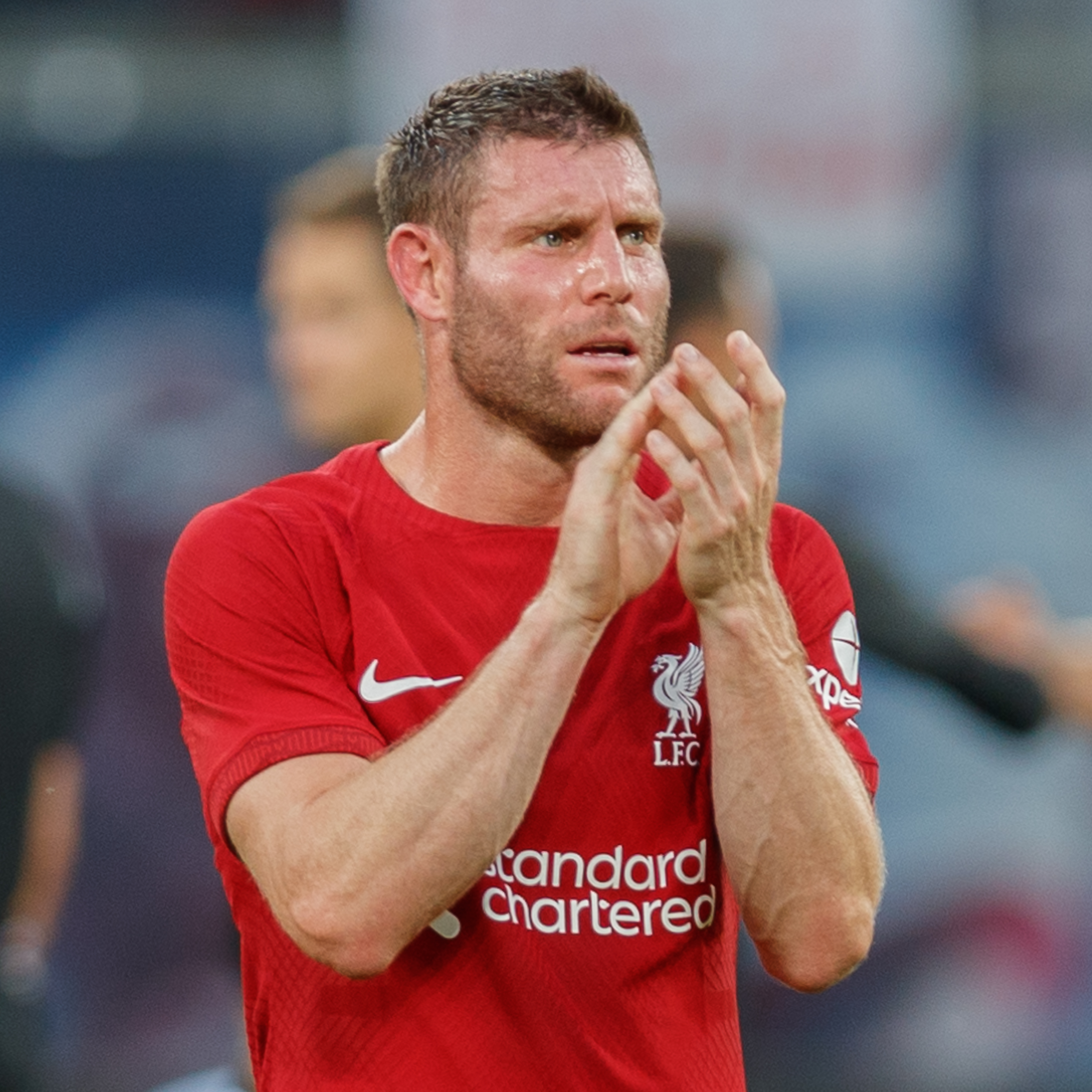
- Milner playing for Liverpool in 2022

Personal information
- Full name: James Philip Milner
- Date of birth: 4 January 1986 (age 40)
- Place of birth: Leeds, West Yorkshire, England
- Height: 5 ft 9 in (1.75 m)
- Positions: Full-back; midfielder; winger

Youth career
- 1996–2002: Leeds United

Senior career*
Years	Team	Apps	(Gls)
2002–2004	Leeds United	48	(5)
2003	→ Swindon Town (loan)	6	(2)
2004–2008	Newcastle United	94	(6)
2005–2006	→ Aston Villa (loan)	27	(1)
2008–2010	Aston Villa	73	(11)
2010–2015	Manchester City	147	(13)
2015–2023	Liverpool	230	(19)
2023–2026	Brighton & Hove Albion	39	(1)
Total		664	(58)

International career
2001–2002	England U16	6	(1)
2002–2003	England U17	11	(5)
2004	England U19	1	(1)
2003–2005	England U20	6	(0)
2004–2009	England U21	46	(8)
2009–2016	England	61	(1)
Medal record
Men's football
Representing England
UEFA European Under-21 Championship
Runner-up	2009
- * Club domestic league appearances and goals

James Philip Milner (born 4 January 1986) is an English former professional footballer. A versatile player, he played in multiple positions, including on the wing, in midfield, and at full-back. He holds the record for the most Premier League appearances (658) and the longest continuous career in the Premier League (24 years). Milner is also one of only five outfield players to have made a Premier League appearance at the age of 40 or older, joining Teddy Sheringham, Ryan Giggs, Gordon Strachan, and Kevin Phillips.

Milner played football for amateur teams from Rawdon and Horsforth. He supported Leeds United from childhood, and joined the Leeds Youth Academy in 1996. He made his debut for the first team in 2002 aged 16 and became the youngest player to score in the Premier League, and later spent time on loan at Swindon Town to gain further first-team experience. After Leeds United were relegated at the end of the 2003–04 season, Milner was sold to Newcastle United. He made over 100 appearances for Newcastle United, winning the UEFA Intertoto Cup in 2006, and spent a year on loan at Aston Villa, before signing for Villa permanently in 2008. After winning the PFA Young Player of the Year award in 2010, Milner was signed by Manchester City, and went on to win two Premier Leagues, one FA Cup, one League Cup and one FA Community Shield. Milner signed for Liverpool in 2015 on a free transfer, and was subsequently appointed vice-captain. With Liverpool, he won the UEFA Champions League in 2019, as well as his third Premier League title, the UEFA Super Cup, the FIFA Club World Cup, and another FA Cup and EFL Cup title. Milner ended his playing career with a three-year spell at Brighton & Hove Albion, before retiring in June 2026.

Milner made a record 46 appearances for the England national under-21 football team, playing at the 2007 and 2009 UEFA European Under-21 Championships, finishing as runner-up in the latter. He won 61 caps for the full national team, scoring once against Moldova. He was selected for the 2010 and 2014 FIFA World Cup squads, as well as the 2012 and 2016 UEFA European Championships.

Including youth internationals, he has made over 1,000 appearances in his career.

== Early life ==
James Philip Milner was born on 4 January 1986 in Wortley, Leeds, West Yorkshire. Milner played most of his childhood football for Westbrook Lane Primary School in Horsforth, where one of his PE teachers and coaches was future Premier League referee Jon Moss, who would give him a red card two decades later.

Milner was later educated at Horsforth School. Graeme Coulson, a coach from Rawdon, recognised Milner's talent and persuaded him to play for Rawdon in several tournaments, including a tournament at Rawdon Meadows, where Milner scored four goals in their victory in the final.

Milner was described as a "first class" student at his school; he left with 11 GCSEs and an award for his performance in physical education. He played for the Yorkshire Schools cricket team, was the cross-country champion at his school for three consecutive years and was the district champion over 100 metres for two consecutive seasons. He then completed his studies at Boston Spa School, a sports college which was a partner to the football club.

Milner supported his hometown club Leeds United from a young age. His earliest memory of the team was watching them win the FA Youth Cup in 1993. He and his parents, Peter and Lesley, were season ticket holders and Milner later became a ball boy for the club.

When Milner was 10 years old, he joined the Leeds United Academy after being spotted by a scout while playing for Westbrook Juniors in Horsforth. At the academy, Milner played against contemporaries from other clubs in Northern England, including future Manchester United striker Wayne Rooney. His role model was Leeds-born Alan Smith, who was then a Leeds United striker. Milner believed playing with Smith put him through a learning curve, as Smith had done what Milner aspired to do in coming through the academy and playing for the first team. Having made good progress at the academy, Milner was taken on as a trainee after leaving school. However, his father insisted that he attend college once a week to continue his education.

Milner continued to excel in the youth team, and played for England at under-15 and under-17 levels. He helped the England under-17 team win the 2002 Nationwide summer tournament against Italy, Czech Republic and Brazil, scoring a goal against Brazil.

== Club career ==
=== Leeds United ===
Milner's first-team debut for Leeds came on 10 November 2002, in a match against West Ham United, when he came on as a substitute for Jason Wilcox for the last six minutes. The appearance made him the second-youngest player ever to play in the Premier League, at the age of 16 years and 309 days. On 26 December 2002, at 16 years and 356 days, he became the youngest player to score in the Premier League, with a goal in a 2–1 win against Sunderland. His record was broken by James Vaughan of Everton in 2005. In a match against Chelsea two days later, Milner scored again, with a deft first touch of the ball and manoeuvre, to avoid a tackle from Chelsea defender Marcel Desailly. The manoeuvre created a yard of space for him to deliver a curling shot from 18 yards (16 m). Reporters were impressed by his overall performance in the match, especially by his desire, confidence, and ability with both feet. Chelsea manager Claudio Ranieri remarked after the match that Milner had performed like a much more experienced player. The performance prompted comparisons to England internationals Michael Owen and Wayne Rooney, who had also come to footballing prominence as teenagers.

After more appearances for Leeds, Milner signed a five-year contract with them on 10 February 2003. At the start of the 2003–04 season, Milner was sent on a one-month loan to Second Division club Swindon Town to gain experience as a first-team player. Before the stint, he saw it as a valuable experience as a player. He spent a month with Swindon, playing in six matches and scoring goals against Peterborough United and Luton Town.

However, Leeds' fortunes were on the decline; the team became the subject of numerous negative stories in the media, and several first-team players were sold. Milner said he believed that this experience made him emotionally stronger and taught him how to deal with team problems. Leeds' eventual relegation to the Championship led to speculation over Milner's future at the club. Tottenham Hotspur, Aston Villa and Everton all expressed an interest in signing him. Ultimately, Villa and Everton did not make offers and Milner rejected an offer from Tottenham as they were based too far from his family home, where he still lived. Leeds insisted that he would not be sold, with chairman Gerald Krasner referring to him as "the future of Leeds". Nonetheless, financial problems eventually forced Leeds to sell Milner to Newcastle United for £5 million. Although Milner was not happy to be leaving the club he had supported as a child, he wished to do what was "in the club's best interest" and in July 2004, he agreed a five-year contract with Newcastle.

=== Newcastle United ===
==== Early career ====
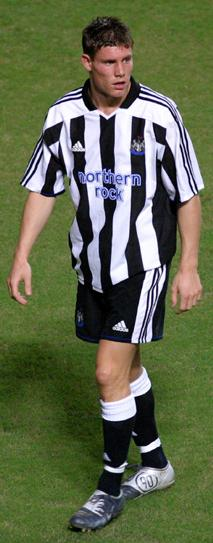
Milner playing for Newcastle United in 2004

Milner made his first appearance for Newcastle United during their pre-season tour of Asia, scoring his first goal for the club in a 1–1 draw against Kitchee, in Hong Kong. During this tour, he took the opportunity to observe how Newcastle striker Alan Shearer dealt with attention from fans and the media and said that his association with people like Shearer gave him a better idea of how to deal with the media.

Milner's first Premier League match for Newcastle came against Middlesbrough on 18 August 2004, in which he played on the right of the field as a winger, despite having featured regularly on the left for Leeds. When asked about this after the match, Milner said he had no preference where on the pitch he played. A month later he made his debut in European competition, when Newcastle played in the UEFA Cup against Bnei Sakhnin from Israel, after coming on as a substitute for Shola Ameobi. In the same month, he scored his first competitive goal for the club, also as a substitute, in a 3–1 win against West Bromwich Albion.

The situation changed for Milner after Newcastle manager Bobby Robson, whom Milner considered his mentor, was sacked and replaced by Graeme Souness. Under Souness, he started 13 league matches, but did not play his first full Premier League match for Newcastle until April 2005. Milner said that he was frustrated at not being used as a starter for most of the season.

At the start of the 2005–06 season, Milner scored in Newcastle's 3–1 away win against FK ZTS Dubnica in the UEFA Intertoto Cup, and also set up Alan Shearer for the team's third goal.

==== Loan to Aston Villa ====
A clause in Newcastle's purchase of Nolberto Solano from Aston Villa resulted in Milner being loaned to Villa for the rest of the season. Villa manager David O'Leary, who had managed Milner at Leeds, was happy to acquire Milner in this deal, saying that he believed Villa got the better of the deal and that he hoped to improve Milner as a player. He made his Villa debut on 12 September 2005 in a Premier League match against West Ham United. Five days later, he scored his first goal for the club in a 1–1 draw against Tottenham Hotspur. In a League Cup match less than a week later, he helped his team recover from being 3–1 down at half-time to win 8–3 against Wycombe Wanderers, scoring two goals in the second-half comeback. Throughout the season, Milner was positive about his team. He remained confident that Villa would recover from a poor start to the season and praised the quality of the squad.

Milner was generally seen as a positive signing in a season that was disappointing for Villa. Milner himself also received the loan move positively, saying that he would like to join Villa permanently because of the probability of becoming a regular starter, but said that the possibility of this happening was beyond his control. Manager David O'Leary confirmed during the season that he would like Milner to join the club permanently, but doubted he would be given the opportunity to sign him. He even pulled out of signing Robert Huth so that he would have the funds to sign Milner permanently if the opportunity arose.

The newly appointed Newcastle manager Glenn Roeder appeared to appreciate Milner's ability more than Souness and expressed a desire that he remain a Newcastle player. This, as well as the departure of O'Leary and the shortage of transfer funds at Villa, meant that a deal to sign Milner permanently seemed unlikely. In June, it became even less likely when Villa rejected an offer of Milner as part of a trade for Gareth Barry. However, the deal was resurrected when Villa were taken over by American billionaire Randy Lerner, and Martin O'Neill was appointed as new manager. A move to Villa appeared to have been agreed, but at the last moment Newcastle recalled Milner and the talks broke down.

==== Return to Newcastle United ====
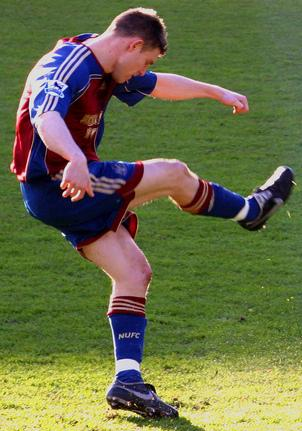
Milner taking a free-kick for Newcastle United in 2007

Newcastle's players and manager Glenn Roeder reacted positively to Milner's return at the start of the 2006–07 season. Milner was a starter in the Newcastle team for the entire season.

Newcastle made a poor start in the 2006–07 Premier League, but in European competition, Milner played a key role in helping Newcastle reach the round of 16 of the UEFA Cup, playing all but one of the Magpies 12 games. Rumours began to spread that he would be sold during the transfer window in January, although both Milner and Roeder dismissed these rumours.

On 1 January 2007, Milner scored his first goal of the season in a 2–2 draw with Manchester United. The goal came from a "stunning" shot from 25 yards (23 m) away. He scored two more goals during the next three weeks, against Birmingham City and then against West Ham United. During the season, Milner displayed his ability to play comfortably in a range of different positions by scoring and setting up goals with both feet from both sides. As a result, Milner signed a new contract at Newcastle in January, which secured his future at the club until 2011. He signed another four-year contract in May 2007, when Sam Allardyce took over as manager of Newcastle. Milner said later in the year that he was happy about his future at the club and its new manager, saying that the training sessions were "the best since I have been here". Allardyce said during the season that Milner was so keen to play, he was concerned Milner would "burn out mentally [and] physically". As a result, Milner played mainly as a substitute in the early part of the season.

In late October, he scored Newcastle's 500th home Premier League goal in a 3–1 win over Tottenham Hotspur. A second Premier League goal of the season came fortuitously in the Tyne–Wear derby from a shot intended as a cross. Allardyce praised Milner during the season, saying he was "a hugely experienced Premier League player".

After missing the final nine matches of the season due to a foot injury, it was rumoured in May 2008 that Milner would be part of a transfer between Newcastle and Liverpool. Despite starting the season for Newcastle and scoring in a League Cup win over Coventry City, it was revealed after the match that Milner had handed in a written transfer request the week before.

=== Return to Aston Villa ===
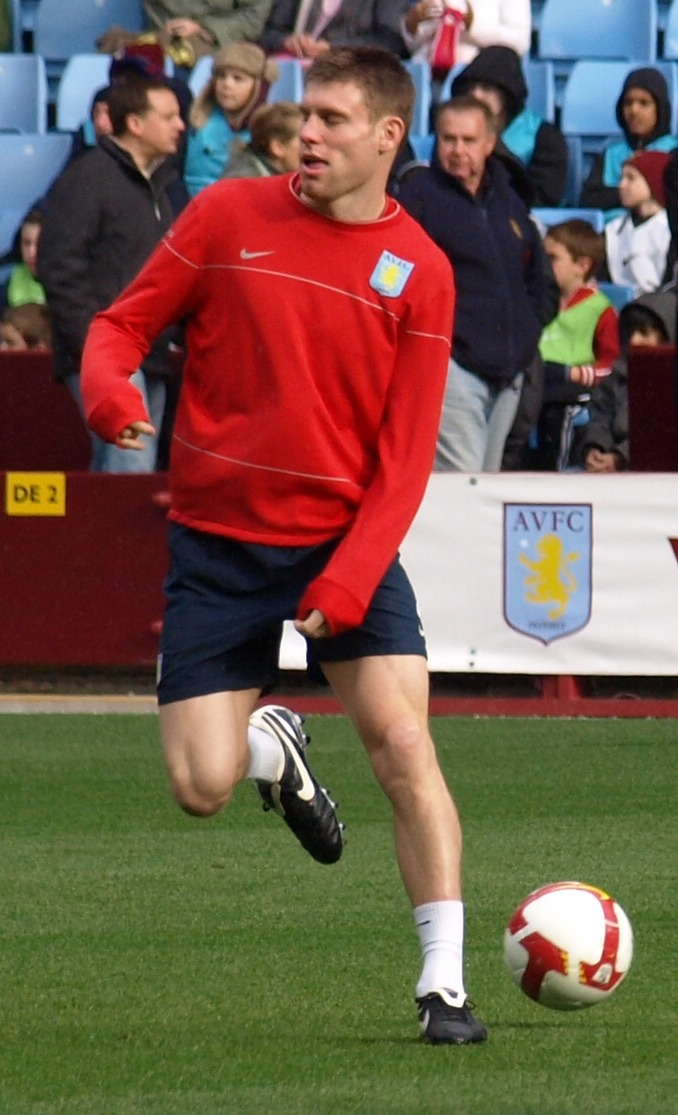
Milner training with Aston Villa in 2009

Milner signed for Aston Villa on 29 August 2008 for a fee of £12 million, and signed a four-year contract with the club. Milner made his debut for Villa on 31 August 2008 as a second-half substitute against Liverpool. His first goals in his second spell at Villa came in a third round FA Cup tie against Gillingham at Priestfield Stadium on 4 January 2009 on his 23rd birthday, where he scored both goals in a 2–1 win for Villa.

Milner's first Premier League goal in his second spell at Villa came on 17 January 2009 in a 2–1 win against Sunderland at the Stadium of Light. On 7 February 2009, Milner was named to the England senior team squad for the first time, after a run at club level that had impressed England manager Fabio Capello. Milner continued to impress and, on 7 February, scored his second league goal of the season against Blackburn Rovers. This was followed by a 25-yard free kick at home against Everton as Villa came back from a 3–1 deficit to draw 3–3 on 12 April. He stated that his time at Villa was the "most settled" period of his career so far, having played for thirteen managers and caretakers despite being only 23.

At the start of the 2009–10 season, Milner moved into the centre of midfield after the sale of captain Gareth Barry to Manchester City. His goal in a win against Sunderland in December 2009 was later voted as Aston Villa's Goal of the Season. On 28 February 2010, he scored the opening goal in the 2010 League Cup final with a penalty. Villa were eventually beaten 2–1 by Manchester United. Milner ended the season with 12 goals and was named Aston Villa's Supporters' Player of the Year and PFA Young Player of the Year.

On 19 May 2010, Manchester City made a £20 million offer for Milner which was rejected. On 22 July 2010, Villa manager Martin O'Neill said that Milner had shown a desire to leave Villa for City, but would only be sold at Villa's valuation. On 14 August, despite being on the verge of a move to Manchester City, Milner played in Villa's first match of the season against West Ham United, scoring Villa's third goal. Milner was given a standing ovation when he was substituted near the end of the match.

=== Manchester City ===
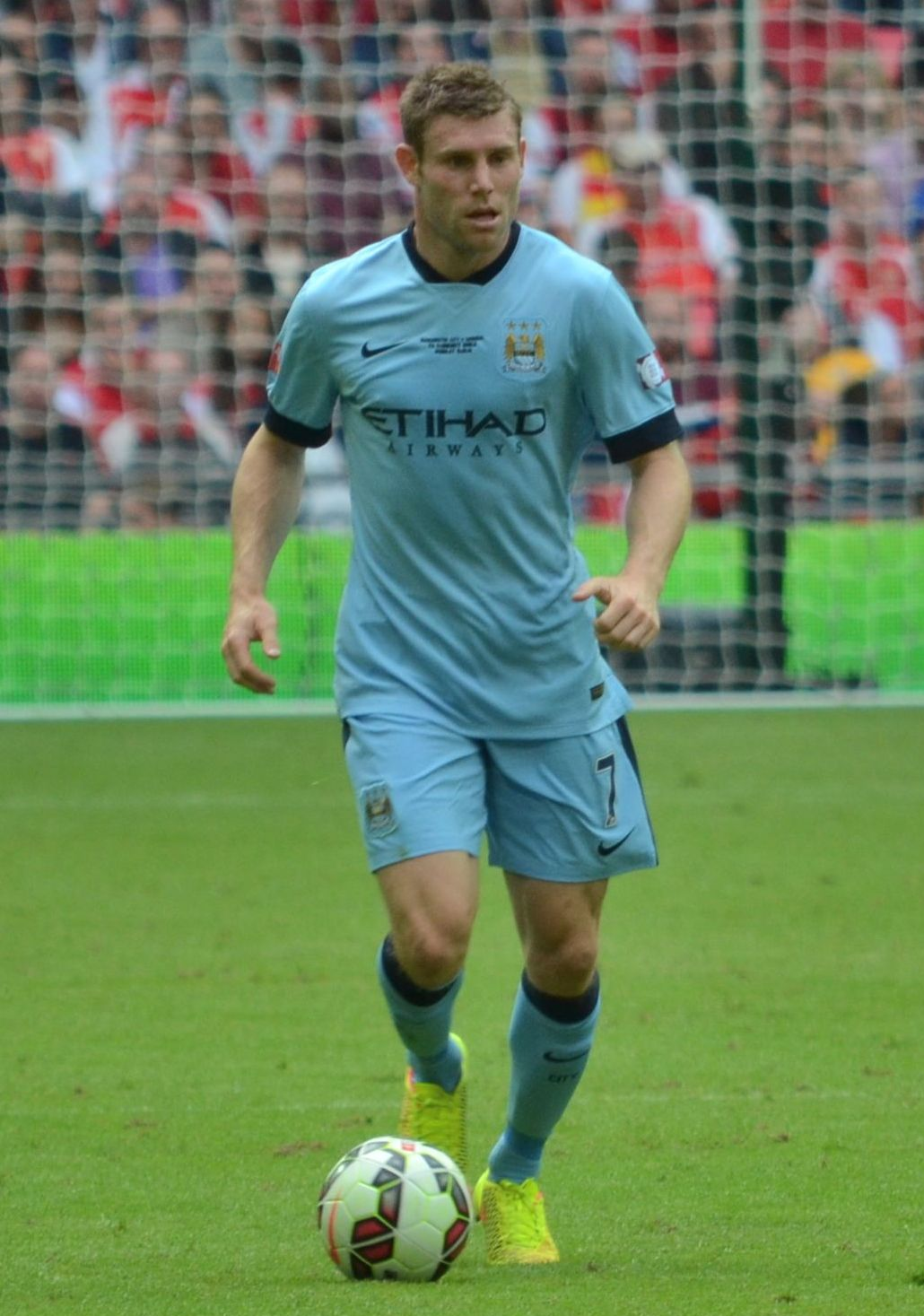
Milner playing for Manchester City in the 2014 FA Community Shield

On 17 August 2010, it was reported that Aston Villa had agreed a deal with Manchester City to sell Milner subject to a medical. The deal was reported to be worth around £26 million, including a player exchange of Stephen Ireland. Milner made his debut for City on 23 August 2010 in a 3–0 home win against Liverpool, where he set up the first goal for former Villa teammate Gareth Barry. Milner scored his first competitive goal for Manchester City in an FA Cup third-round match at Leicester City which ended in a 2–2 draw. The Leicester match was the start of a cup run that saw Manchester City reach the 2011 FA Cup final. Milner was an unused substitute as Manchester City beat Stoke City 1–0 to win the FA Cup.

Milner scored his first Premier League goal for Manchester City against Everton on 24 September 2011. Two matches later, he scored his second, against former club Aston Villa in a 4–1 win. The following week, Milner had a hand in two goals as Manchester City won the Manchester derby at Old Trafford 6–1, inflicting Manchester United's heaviest home league defeat since 1930. Over the course of the 2011–12 season, Milner made 26 Premier League appearances as Manchester City won the league title for the first time in 44 years.

Milner won his first Community Shield in August 2012, as City beat Chelsea at Villa Park. On 6 October 2012, Milner scored his first goal of the 2012–13 season from a free kick to seal a 3–0 win against Sunderland. On 20 October, he received his first Premier League red card in a 2–1 win at West Bromwich Albion. On 13 January 2013, he scored City's opening goal in a 2–0 away win at Arsenal, which was the first time a City player had scored away at Arsenal in the League since 2007, and City's first win in the league at Arsenal since 1975. On 8 April, he scored in the Manchester derby as City beat Manchester United 2–1 at Old Trafford.

On 10 December 2013, Milner scored the winning goal in a 3–2 win against the reigning European champions Bayern Munich at the Allianz Arena in the UEFA Champions League, becoming the first English player to score for Manchester City in the competition that season. That season would see Milner win a first League Cup winner's medal and a second Premier League title.

=== Liverpool ===
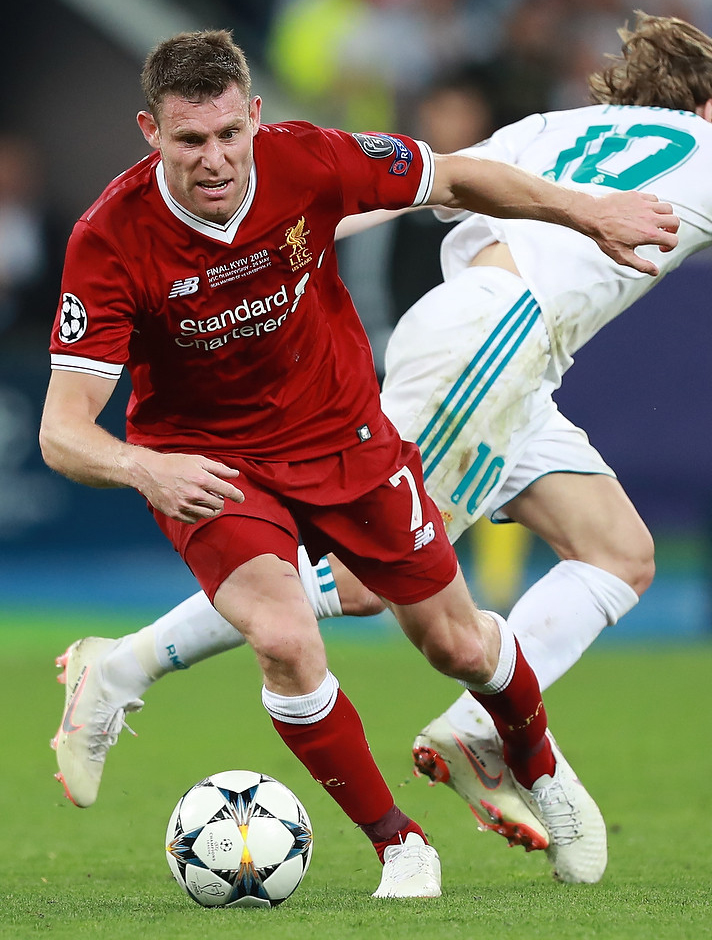
Milner playing for Liverpool in the 2018 UEFA Champions League final

On 4 June 2015, Milner agreed to join Liverpool on a free transfer from Manchester City. On 7 August, Milner was announced as the vice-captain. Milner played his first competitive match for the club in 1–0 win over Stoke City at the Britannia Stadium. Milner captained Liverpool for the first time on his third appearance for the club, a 0–0 draw at Arsenal. On 26 September, he scored his debut goal for Liverpool in a 3–2 win against his former club Aston Villa at Anfield. He appeared in the 2016 UEFA Europa League final at the end of his first season with the club. Milner ended his first season with Liverpool scoring seven goals and recording 15 assists in all competitions.

On 19 March 2017, Milner scored in Liverpool's 1–1 draw against former club Manchester City. In doing so, he broke a Premier League record by a player for the most matches scored in without losing (47 matches). In 2017–18 season, Milner assisted 9 goals in a single Champions League campaign, setting a new record previously held by Wayne Rooney in 2013–14 and Neymar in 2016–17.

On 3 November 2018, Milner scored his 50th Premier League goal during a 1–1 draw at Arsenal. The following month, Milner became just the 13th player (and the 2nd youngest after former Aston Villa, Manchester City and England teammate Gareth Barry) in Premier League history to reach 500 appearances, during a 4–0 win at Bournemouth. On 1 June 2019, Milner won his first Champions League title, coming on as a substitute in the final against Tottenham Hotspur, as Liverpool won 2–0 in the final.

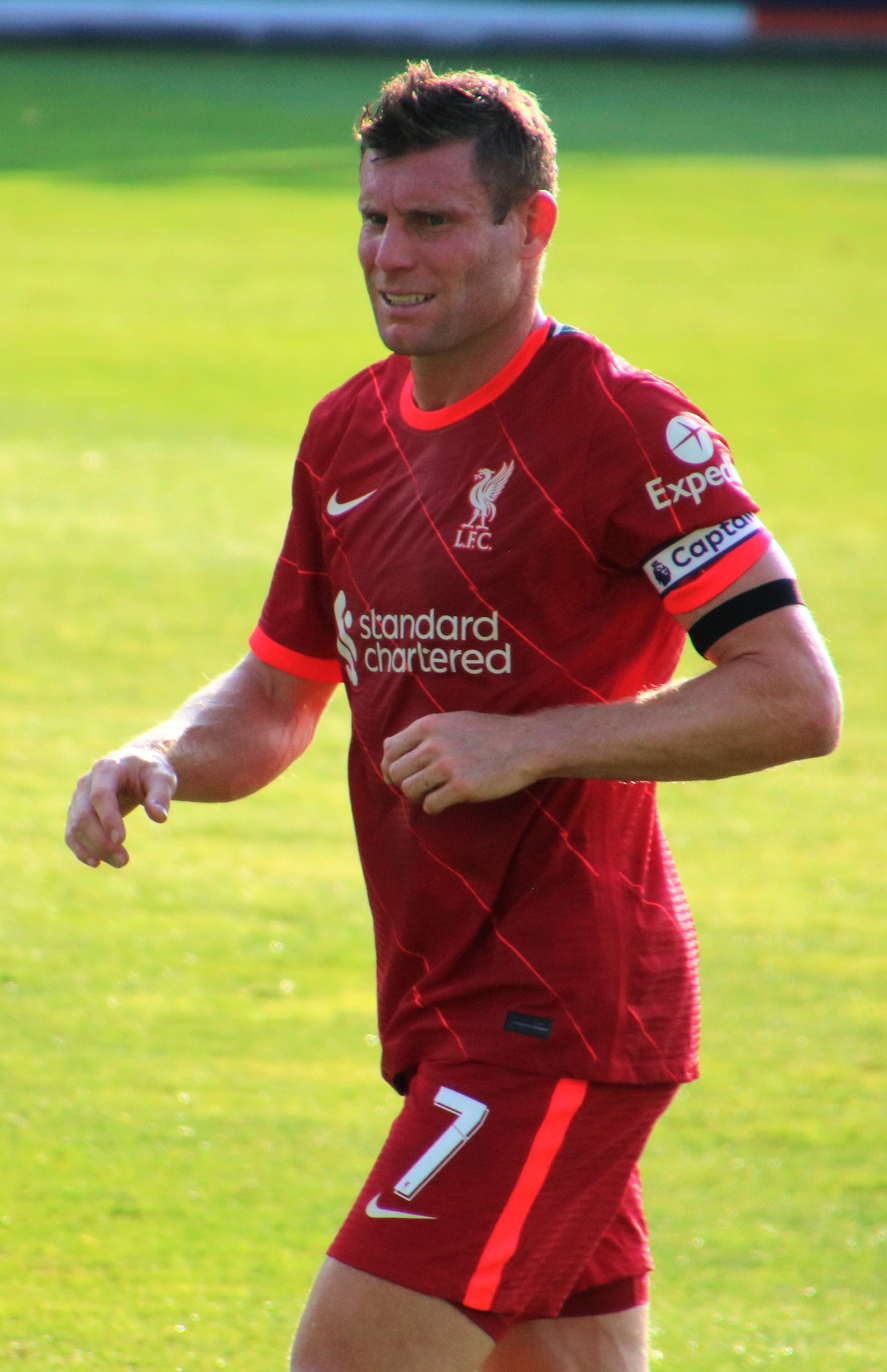
Milner playing for Liverpool in 2021

On 14 August 2019, Milner won his first UEFA Super Cup, starting the 2019 match against Chelsea, as Liverpool won after a penalty shoot-out in Istanbul. In December, Milner signed a new contract reportedly keeping him at the club until 2022, although Liverpool did not specify the contract length. Later that month, Milner came on as a substitute as Liverpool won the FIFA Club World Cup for the first time in the club's history, beating Flamengo 1–0 in the final. On 26 December, Milner scored a penalty in a 4–0 Premier League victory over Leicester City at The King Power Stadium; it would be the last goal Milner ever scored for Liverpool. On 25 June 2020, Milner won his third Premier League title and his first for Liverpool.

Milner was not a regular starter during the 2020–21 season, amassing just 11 starts and making 26 appearances in all competitions. As a result, he registered the first goalless season of his career. He still remained an important player as Liverpool overcame multiple difficulties to finish third, qualifying for the following season's Champions League on the final day of the season.

On 16 February 2022, Milner came on as a substitute in a 2–0 Champions League win against Inter Milan to make his 800th senior appearance at club level. On 27 February, Milner scored Liverpool's first penalty of the shoot-out in the 2022 EFL Cup final victory over Chelsea. On 14 May, Milner once again scored Liverpool's first penalty of the shoot-out in the 2022 FA Cup final victory over Chelsea. On 6 June, Milner signed a one-year extension with the club.

On 5 October 2022, Milner made his 300th appearance for Liverpool in a 2–0 victory against Rangers in the 2022–23 Champions League. On 12 November, Milner came on as a substitute against Southampton to make his 600th Premier League appearance. On 4 April 2023, in a 0–0 draw against Chelsea, Milner marked his 610th Premier League appearance, which moved him up to third place in all-time Premier League's appearance charts. On 17 May 2023, Liverpool announced that Milner would be one of the players leaving the club at the end of the season upon the expiry of his contract.

=== Brighton & Hove Albion ===
On 14 June 2023, Premier League club Brighton & Hove Albion announced that Milner would join the club upon the expiry of his contract with Liverpool. He agreed a one-year contract until the end of the 2023–24 season, with the option to extend for another year. He made his Brighton debut on 12 August, in the club's opening game of the 2023–24 season, starting and playing 79 minutes of the match in the 4–1 home win over Premier League newcomers Luton Town. On 16 September, he played in a 3–1 away win over Manchester United, to become the first player to win at Old Trafford with four different clubs, in addition to achieving a record of 11 victories in total including 6 away wins against the same opponent. On 22 January 2024, Milner played his 633rd Premier League match in a home goalless draw against Wolverhampton, moving ahead of Ryan Giggs to be second in all-time appearances, only behind Gareth Barry with 653.

On 15 May 2024, Milner signed a new one-year deal with Brighton. He featured in the 2024–25 season opening match on 17 August, which ended in a 3–0 away win against Everton, becoming the first player to play 23 Premier League seasons. Later that month, on 31 August, he suffered a hamstring injury in a 1–1 away draw against Arsenal, which sidelined him for most of the season. On 25 May 2025, he came on as a late substitute in a 4–1 away victory against Tottenham Hotspur on the final matchday of the season.

On 13 June 2025, Milner extended his contract by another year to remain at Brighton. In August 2025, he changed his squad number from 6 to 20 for the 2025–26 season, in honour of his former Liverpool teammate Diogo Jota, who died in a car accident on 3 July. On 16 August, Milner came off the bench in the season opener against Fulham, thus extending his record by appearing in a 24th consecutive Premier League season. He then scored his first goal for Brighton on 31 August, from the penalty spot, in a 2–1 victory against former club Manchester City which was his first competitive goal in six years. This made him the Premier League's second oldest goalscorer and oldest penalty goalscorer, at the time, at 39 years and 239 days old. On 13 December 2025, Milner received a standing ovation by the Liverpool home fans at Anfield, in gratitude of his career as a player.

On 11 February 2026, Milner equaled Gareth Barry's Premier League appearance record by making his 653rd appearance in a match against his former club, Aston Villa. He then broke the record on 21 February, making his 654th Premier League appearance, after starting in a 2–0 away win against Brentford, reaching 441 starts in total. On 1 March, Milner started in a 2–1 home win against Nottingham Forest, in what was his 900th competitive game in his professional club career. On 1 June, Milner announced his retirement from professional football after 24 seasons, all of which were consecutively spent in the Premier League.

== Coaching career ==
On 14 September 2026, James Pearce of The Athletic reported that Milner had returned to Liverpool on a temporary, "casual", basis, assisting across multiple younger age groups (including U-11s) as he worked towards a UEFA Pro License. In the same article, Pearce noted that during his playing career Milner assisted with academy coaching at Liverpool, while Fabian Hürzeler included him on the coaching side of Brighton and Hove Albion.

== International career ==
=== Youth ===
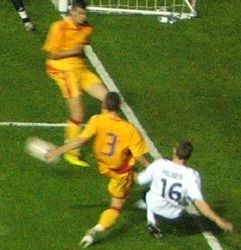
Milner (right, in white) playing for the England under-21 team

After representing England at the under-15 and under-17 levels, Milner was promoted to the under-20 level and called up for the 2003 World Youth Championship, but was recalled by Leeds United four days before the opening game. Soon after this, under-21 manager Peter Taylor called him up to the England under-21 team and Milner made his debut against Sweden on 30 March 2004.

Milner scored for the England under-21 team during the 2004–05 season in a qualification match for the 2007 UEFA European Under-21 Championship, against Wales. During the match, in which he played in the centre of midfield, he set up a scoring chance for Darren Bent as the Young Lions won 2–0. Despite domestic club troubles, he continued to make progress at international level, scoring the winning goal for the England under-21 team in a 3–2 win over Switzerland. The win secured England a place in the playoff stage of the 2007 UEFA European Under-21 Championship qualifiers.

In June, Milner competed for England at the 2007 UEFA European Under-21 Championship. He played in all four of England's matches and was booked in the semi-final against the Netherlands, which meant he would have missed the final. The match was decided by a penalty shoot-out, in which Milner scored twice and England lost 13–12. Milner was included in the under-21 squad for a friendly against Romania, which ended in a 1–1 draw. A month later, Milner set an England under-21 record by making his 30th appearance for the team in a 3–0 win against Montenegro. Historically, players with several England Under-21 appearances have not progressed to become regulars in the senior team, which has led some to doubt whether Milner would be able to successfully make the transition. In October, he scored his third goal for the under-21 team in a 3–0 win over Republic of Ireland. He scored again in the return match four months later that England also won 3–0.

Milner continued to be a regular and was the only player, along with Joe Hart and captain Steven Taylor, to have played in all the qualifiers for the 2009 UEFA European Under-21 Championship. In the summer of 2009, he was in the squad for the 2009 UEFA European Under-21 Championship in Sweden. He helped set up the winning goal for Micah Richards against Finland, and manager Stuart Pearce said after the match, "The modern-day full-back can get up and down the pitch and I knew [Milner] would be comfortable". In England's second match against Spain, Milner had a penalty saved by Sergio Asenjo, and scored England's second goal in a 2–0 win. England faced the hosts Sweden in the semi-finals. After the match ended in a 3–3 draw, it went to a penalty shoot-out. Milner was the only England player to miss in the shoot-out after he slipped just before kicking the ball, causing it to go over the crossbar. England won the shoot-out 5–4 to advance to the final for the first time in 25 years. England lost the final to Germany 4–0 and Milner said after the match that the team was "hurting" and that the way in which the team lost was "not good enough". The final was his last match for the under-21 team. His 46 appearances at under-21 level are a national record.

=== Senior ===
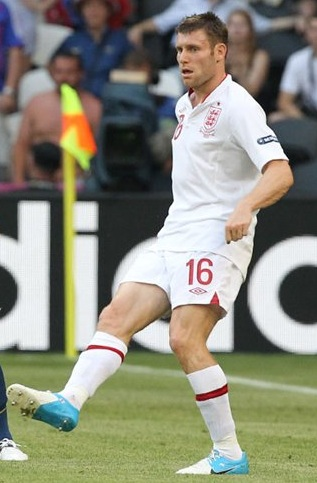
Milner playing for England at UEFA Euro 2012

In August 2009, Milner made his debut for the England senior team, when he came on as a substitute in a friendly match against the Netherlands for the final 23 minutes. The match ended in a 2–2 draw. He played again for England the following month against Slovenia in another friendly and made his competitive debut four days later in a 2010 FIFA World Cup qualifier against Croatia, where he played the final nine minutes. England won the latter match 5–1 to secure qualification for the 2010 FIFA World Cup. He was named in the squad for the World Cup finals in South Africa and was selected in the starting lineup for England's first match of the tournament against the United States, although he was substituted after 30 minutes. In England's third match against Slovenia, he set up the only goal of the match with a cross for Jermain Defoe. He captained England for the first time for the final 10 minutes of the match in a 2–1 loss against France on 17 November 2010, when both Rio Ferdinand and Steven Gerrard had been substituted.

Milner played in six matches during qualifying for UEFA Euro 2012, and was named in Roy Hodgson's 23-man squad for the tournament. Milner started Hodgson's first match in charge, a 1–0 friendly win against Norway. He started all of England's group stage games as the Three Lions finished top of group D and qualified for the quarter-finals. He started but was taken off after an hour as England were eliminated by Italy in a penalty shoot-out.

On 7 September 2012, Milner scored his first and only international goal in a 5–0 win away to Moldova during 2014 FIFA World Cup qualifying. Milner was included in Hodgson's squad for the 2014 FIFA World Cup. However, Milner failed to secure a regular starting place, coming on as a substitute in the final group game against Costa Rica after England had already been eliminated, with the game ending in a 0–0 draw. Milner was part of the England squad for Euro 2016, but once again was unable to secure regular playing time. Milner played just five minutes in the group stage, coming on as a late substitute against Russia, and did not play in England's loss to Iceland in the round of 16.

On 5 August 2016, Milner announced his retirement from international football following discussions with new England manager Sam Allardyce. The England manager Gareth Southgate enquired Milner's availability at the 2018 FIFA World Cup, but Milner declined to return to international action.

== Style of play ==
Milner is renowned for his versatility; across his career, Milner played as a winger, central midfielder, defensive midfielder, attacking midfielder, centre-forward and full-back, with Milner's preferred position being as a central midfielder. During his time at Leeds United and Newcastle United, Milner predominantly played as a winger. He has been described as "comfortable on either wing". He moved into central midfield during his time at Aston Villa. Under Jürgen Klopp, Milner spent all of the 2016–17 season playing at left-back for Liverpool. Milner stated he did not enjoy playing as a left-back but also said: "It's about whatever's best for the team and ultimately I just want to be out there playing games, contributing and helping this football club." He also played in a holding role and in a box-to-box role on occasion for Liverpool in later seasons, drawing praise in the media for his dynamism, energy, work-rate, and consistent performances.

Milner is regarded as being a tenacious footballer. Manuel Pellegrini, who managed Milner at Manchester City, described him as the most complete English player in the modern game, praising his all round ability, commitment, performance level and versatility. Milner is often considered to be one of the most underrated players of his generation, with The Telegraph including him at number seven in their list of "The top 20 most under-rated footballers of all time" in 2015, describing him as "hard working, reliable and intelligent."

Milner had the ability to pass accurately and shoot from a great distance from goal. As a result, he usually goes forward for set pieces and is often a candidate to take corners and free kicks. While Milner does not score many goals, he does have a good record at providing assists – as of March 2026 he is 10th on the all-time Premier League assist chart. Critical opinion is divided as to Milner's crossing ability. While some commentators have been critical of his ability in this area, other journalists have said that Milner can produce accurate crosses.

Milner, in his time at the club, was described on the Newcastle United official website as "a good reader of the game". This awareness allows him to pass the ball from a range of positions to teammates making forward runs, as well as giving him the confidence to take on defenders.

== Personal life ==
Milner is married to Amy Fletcher. The couple have two children: a daughter and a son. Milner learnt to speak Spanish to better communicate with his teammates, and in 2019 said that he spoke to his children only in Spanish to ensure they too learnt the language.

Milner set up the James Milner Foundation, which holds a themed annual ball to raise money for various charitable causes. He is a teetotaler.

Milner was appointed Member of the Order of the British Empire (MBE) in the 2022 Birthday Honours for services to association football and charity.

In November 2026, Milner ran the New York Marathon, in a time of 3:09:04.

== Career statistics ==
=== Club ===
Appearances and goals by club, season and competition
Club	Season	League			FA Cup		League Cup		Europe		Other		Total	
Club	Season	Division	Apps	Goals	Apps	Goals	Apps	Goals	Apps	Goals	Apps	Goals	Apps	Goals
Leeds United	2002–03	Premier League	18	2	4	0	0	0	0	0	—		22	2
Leeds United	2003–04	Premier League	30	3	1	0	1	0	—		—		32	3
Leeds United	Total		48	5	5	0	1	0	0	0	—		54	5
Swindon Town (loan)	2003–04	Second Division	6	2	—		—		—		—		6	2
Newcastle United	2004–05	Premier League	25	1	4	0	1	0	11 (Note: Appearances in UEFA Cup)	0	—		41	1
Newcastle United	2005–06	Premier League	3	0	—		—		4 (Note: Appearances in UEFA Intertoto Cup)	2	—		7	2
Newcastle United	2006–07	Premier League	35	3	2	1	3	0	13 (Note: Two appearances in UEFA Intertoto Cup, eleven appearances in UEFA Cup)	0	—		53	4
Newcastle United	2007–08	Premier League	29	2	2	1	1	0	—		—		32	3
Newcastle United	2008–09	Premier League	2	0	—		1	1	—		—		3	1
Newcastle United	Total		94	6	8	2	6	1	28	2	—		136	11
Aston Villa (loan)	2005–06	Premier League	27	1	3	0	3	2	—		—		33	3
Aston Villa	2008–09	Premier League	36	3	3	3	—		4	0	—		43	6
Aston Villa	2009–10	Premier League	36	7	5	0	6	4	2 (Note: Appearances in UEFA Europa League)	1	—		49	12
Aston Villa	2010–11	Premier League	1	1	—		—		—		—		1	1
Aston Villa	Total		73	11	8	3	6	4	6	1	—		93	19
Manchester City	2010–11	Premier League	32	0	3	2	1	0	5	0	—		41	1
Manchester City	2011–12	Premier League	26	3	1	0	3	0	6 (Note: Four appearances in UEFA Champions League, two appearances in UEFA Europa League)	0	1 (Note: Appearance in FA Community Shield)	0	37	3
Manchester City	2012–13	Premier League	26	4	6	0	1	0	2 (Note: Appearances in UEFA Champions League)	0	1	0	36	4
Manchester City	2013–14	Premier League	31	1	4	0	3	0	6	1	—		44	2
Manchester City	2014–15	Premier League	32	5	2	2	2	0	8	1	1	0	45	8
Manchester City	Total		147	13	16	4	10	0	27	2	3	0	203	18
Liverpool	2015–16	Premier League	28	5	1	0	4	0	12	2	—		45	7
Liverpool	2016–17	Premier League	36	7	0	0	4	0	—		—		40	7
Liverpool	2017–18	Premier League	32	0	2	1	0	0	13	0	—		47	1
Liverpool	2018–19	Premier League	31	5	1	0	1	0	12	2	—		45	7
Liverpool	2019–20	Premier League	22	2	2	0	2	2	8	0	3 (Note: One appearance in UEFA Super Cup, two appearances in FIFA Club World Cup)	0	37	4
Liverpool	2020–21	Premier League	26	0	2	0	1	0	6	0	1	0	36	0
Liverpool	2021–22	Premier League	24	0	3	0	4	0	8	0	—		39	0
Liverpool	2022–23	Premier League	31	0	2	0	1	0	8	0	1	0	43	0
Liverpool	Total		230	19	13	1	17	2	67	4	5	0	332	26
Brighton & Hove Albion	2023–24	Premier League	15	0	0	0	0	0	5	0	—		20	0
Brighton & Hove Albion	2024–25	Premier League	4	0	0	0	0	0	—		—		4	0
Brighton & Hove Albion	2025–26	Premier League	20	1	0	0	2	0	—		—		22	1
Brighton & Hove Albion	Total		39	1	0	0	2	0	5	0	—		46	1
Career total			664	58	53	10	45	9	133	9	8	0	903	86

=== International ===
Appearances and goals by national team and year
National team	Year	Apps	Goals
England	2009	6	0
England	2010	9	0
England	2011	8	0
England	2012	11	1
England	2013	10	0
England	2014	9	0
England	2015	4	0
England	2016	4	0
Total		61	1

England score listed first, score column indicates score after Milner goal

List of international goals scored by James Milner
No.	Date	Venue	Cap	Opponent	Score	Result	Competition	Ref.
1	7 September 2012	Zimbru Stadium, Chișinău, Moldova	32	Moldova	4–0	5–0	2014 FIFA World Cup qualification	

== Honours ==
Newcastle United

- UEFA Intertoto Cup: 2006

Aston Villa

- Football League Cup runner-up: 2009–10

Manchester City

- Premier League: 2011–12, 2013–14
- FA Cup: 2010–11; runner-up: 2012–13
- Football League Cup: 2013–14
- FA Community Shield: 2012

Liverpool

- Premier League: 2019–20
- FA Cup: 2021–22
- Football League/EFL Cup: 2021–22; runner-up: 2015–16
- FA Community Shield: 2022
- UEFA Champions League: 2018–19; runner-up: 2017–18, 2021–22
- UEFA Super Cup: 2019
- FIFA Club World Cup: 2019
- UEFA Europa League runner-up: 2015–16

England U21

- UEFA European Under-21 Championship runner-up: 2009

Individual

- PFA Young Player of the Year: 2009–10
- PFA Team of the Year: 2009–10 Premier League
- Aston Villa Supporters' Player of the Year: 2009–10
