= Adrian Pettigrew =

English footballer

Personal information
- Full name: Adrian Robert James Pettigrew
- Date of birth: 12 November 1986 (age 40)
- Place of birth: Hackney, England
- Height: 6 ft 0 in (1.83 m)
- Positions: Central defender; midfielder

Youth career
- 1999–2005: Chelsea

Senior career*
Years	Team	Apps	(Gls)
2005–2008	Chelsea	0	(0)
2007	→ Wycombe Wanderers (loan)	1	(0)
2007	→ Brentford (loan)	11	(0)
2008	→ Rotherham United (loan)	4	(0)
2008	Cheshunt	2	(0)
2009	Bishop's Stortford	1	(0)
2009	A.F.C. Sudbury	1	(0)
2009	Cheshunt	2	(0)
2011–2012	West End	21	(3)
Total		43	(3)

International career
2001–2002	England U16	6	(0)
2002	England U17	3	(0)
- * Club domestic league appearances and goals

Adrian Robert James Pettigrew (born 12 November 1986) is an English former professional footballer who played as a central defender in the Football League for Brentford, Rotherham United and Wycombe Wanderers. A product of the Chelsea academy, he dropped into non-League football after his release in 2008.

== Club career ==
=== Chelsea ===
A central defender, Pettigrew began his career in the Chelsea Academy and turned professional in March 2005. He captained the reserve team during the 2005–06 season. In August 2006, Pettigrew was set to join League Two club Wycombe Wanderers on loan, but the deal was put on hold due to injury. He finally joined the club on 5 March 2007, on loan until the end of the 2006–07 season, as cover for the injured Mike Williamson. Pettigrew made just one appearance for the Chairboys, with a start in a 1–0 defeat to Bristol Rovers on 27 March and he was substituted for Chris Palmer at half time. The loan was ended early on 17 April.

On 10 August 2007, Pettigrew joined newly relegated League Two club Brentford on a one-month loan, which was later extended for two further months. He was an ever-present in the Bees' opening 11 matches of the season and finished his spell on 11 November, with 14 appearances. On 31 January 2008, Pettigrew joined League Two club Rotherham United on loan until the end of the 2007–08 season. The financially stricken club went into administration on 18 March and Pettigrew's loan was ended early on 3 April 2008, after he had made just four appearances. Pettigrew was released by Chelsea at the end of the 2007–08 season.

=== Non-league football ===
After rejecting the chance to join Zulte Waregem and trialling with AEK Athens, Pettigrew had short spells in non-League football with Cheshunt, Bishop's Stortford and A.F.C. Sudbury during the 2008–09 season. He later played for Middlesex County League First Division Central & East club West End during the 2011–12 and 2012–13 seasons.

== International career ==
Pettigrew was capped by England at U16 and U17 level. He was part of the U17 team which won the 2002 Nordic U17 Championship.

== Career statistics ==
Appearances and goals by club, season and competition
Club	Season	League			FA Cup		League Cup		Other		Total	
Club	Season	Division	Apps	Goals	Apps	Goals	Apps	Goals	Apps	Goals	Apps	Goals
Wycombe Wanderers (loan)	2006–07	League Two	1	0	—		—		—		1	0
Brentford (loan)	2007–08	League Two	11	0	1	0	1	0	1 (Note: Appearances in Football League Trophy)	0	14	0
Rotherham United (loan)	2007–08	League Two	4	0	—		—		—		4	0
Cheshunt	2008–09	Isthmian League First Division South	2	0	—		—		—		2	0
Bishop's Stortford	2008–09	Conference South	1	0	—		—		—		1	0
A.F.C. Sudbury	2008–09	Southern League First Division Midlands	1	0	—		—		—		1	0
Cheshunt	2008–09	Isthmian League First Division South	2	0	—		—		—		2	0
West End	2011–12	Middlesex County League First Division Central & East	19	3	—		—		3 (Note: 2 appearances in Middlesex County League President's First Division Cup, 1 appearance in Middlesex Senior Cup)	0	22	3
West End	2012–13	Middlesex County League First Division Central & East	2	0	—		—		0	0	2	0
West End	Total		21	3	—		—		3	0	24	3
Career total			39	3	1	0	1	0	4	0	45	3

== Honours ==
England U17

- Nordic U17 Championship: 2002
