= Osei Sankofa =

English footballer (born 1985)

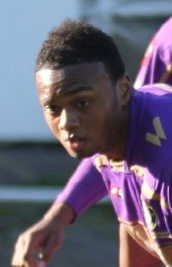
- Sankofa playing for Farnborough in 2011

Personal information
- Full name: Osei Omari Kwende Sankofa
- Date of birth: 19 March 1985 (age 41)
- Place of birth: Streatham, London, England
- Position: Defender

Senior career*
Years	Team	Apps	(Gls)
2002–2008	Charlton Athletic	15	(0)
2005	→ Bristol City (loan)	8	(0)
2008	→ Brentford (loan)	11	(0)
2008–2010	Southend United	39	(0)
2010–2011	Farnborough	19	(1)
2011–2012	Boreham Wood	36	(1)
2012–2013	Eastleigh	11	(1)
2013	Hayes & Yeading United	9	(0)
2013–2014	Ebbsfleet United	30	(0)
2014–2015	Whitehawk	31	(3)
2015–2016	Dulwich Hamlet	30	(0)

International career
2001	England U16	1	(0)
2001	England U17	1	(0)
2002–2003	England U18	4	(0)
2003–2004	England U19	2	(0)
2004	England U20	1	(0)
- * Club domestic league appearances and goals as of 18:00, 1 April 2016 (UTC)

Osei Omari Kwende Sankofa (born 19 March 1985) is an English footballer, who last played for Isthmian League Premier club Dulwich Hamlet. He plays as a defender who can play anywhere across the back line.

Sankofa started out his career at Charlton Athletic and went out on loan to Bristol City and Brentford. After being released by Charlton Athletic, he joined Southend United in 2008. Following his two–year spell, in which he was used primarily as a utility player, Sankofa played for various non–league clubs, starting at Farnborough, Boreham Wood, Eastleigh, Hayes & Yeading United, Ebbsfleet United, Whitehawk and Dulwich Hamlet.

== Club career ==
=== Charlton Athletic ===
Born in London, UK, Sankofa started out his career at Charlton Athletic and joined the academy in 2000. After progressing through the Charlton Athletic academy, he made his Charlton Athletic debut in the 4–1 defeat to Manchester United in the 2002–03 season. Despite the defeat, he said the match was his career highest. In December 2004, he signed a contract with the club.

The next season, he was an unused substitute on more than one occasion. Sankofa went on loan to Bristol City in September 2005. He made his Bristol City debut on 28 September 2005, where he started and kept a clean sheet, in a 3–0 win over Barnsley; and was praised by Manager Gary Johnson for his impressive display. Following his debut, Sankofa was given a handful of first team appearances at Bristol City, resulting his loan spell at the club extended for another month. However, on 11 November 2005, he was sent off against Swindon Town for a professional foul on Hamer Bouazza, which saw them lose 2–1. Sankofa went on to make eight appearances for Bristol City before returning to his parent club soon after.

After his loan spell at Bristol City came to an end, Sankofa made his first Charlton Athletic appearance for the first time in three years, in a 2–1 win over Portsmouth on 17 April 2006. This was followed up by against Bolton Wanderers on 22 April 2006, where he made his full debut, in a 4–1 win for Charlton Athletic. Sankofa went on to make four appearances for Charlton Athletic at the end of the 2005–06 season.

After suffering an injury at the start of the 2006–07 season, Sankofa's first appearance came on 19 September 2006, coming on as a late substitute, in a 1–0 win over Carlisle United in the second round of the League Cup. His first Premier League appearance of the season came on 23 December 2006, in a 2–0 loss against Middlesbrough. However, Sankofa was sent off again whilst playing against Arsenal on 2 January 2007 for a professional foul on Robin Van Persie. He subsequently got the initial one match ban extended by one match for what the FA deemed to be a "frivolous" appeal. After returning from suspension, Sankofa went on to make a total of 12 appearances at the end of the 2006–07 season but Charlton Athletic were relegated to the Championship. Despite this, on 8 June 2007, he signed a new one-year contract with Charlton.

However, in the 2007–08 season, Sankofa made only two appearances for the club; with one came from the league and the other one came from the League Cup. It came after when he suffered an injury at the start of the season. As a result, he was expected to leave the club on loan in January by Manager Alan Pardew.

In January 2008, Sankofa was loaned out to Brentford on a one-month deal. He made his Brentford debut on 29 January 2008, where he came on as a first half substitute, in a 0–0 draw against Notts County. After making his first start in a 3–2 win over Mansfield Town on 2 February 2008, his loan spell at Brentford was extended until the end of the season. After suffering injuries, Although he lost his first team place towards the end of the season, Sankofa went on to make 11 appearances for Brentford.

In May 2008, Sankofa was released by Charlton.

=== Southend United ===
On 23 June 2008, Sankofa joined Southend United on a free transfer, signing a two–year contract. Upon joining the club, he said the move would help his kickstart his career and can play at both right-back and centre-back. He was then given a number 15 shirt ahead of the new season.

He made his Southend United debut on 12 August 2008, coming on as substitute in extra time, in a 1–0 loss against Cheltenham Town in the first round of League Cup. Six days later, on 18 August 2008, he made his league debut for the club, again coming on as a substitute in a 1–1 draw against Millwall. Initially on the substitute bench at the start of the season, Sankofa began to receive more playing time around October. Although he was demoted back to the substitute bench between late–October and mid–December, Sankofa regained his first team place soon after from December. His first team place saw him regained his confidence for the next three months. Towards the end of the 2008–09 season, he soon lost his first team place to Dorian Dervite. Despite this, Sankofa went on to make the total of 30 appearances in his first season at Southend United.

However, in his second season at Southend United, Sankofa suffered an Achilles injury at training during the pre–season tour. Although he returned to training from injury in mid–August, Sankofa remained on the substitute bench for the next six matches and was subsequently played in the reserve. He made his first appearance of the 2009–10 season, in a 3–2 defeat against Brighton & Hove Albion on 19 September 2009. After appearing four more times, Sankofa suffered a knee injury during a 3–1 loss against Southampton on 9 October 2009; which saw him out for five weeks, eventually out for two months. After returning to the first team from injury, Sankofa spent the rest of the 2009–10 season on the substitute bench and played six more times since returning. At the end of the season, he went on to make 12 appearances in all competitions.

However, Sankofa was used primarily as a utility player for Southend, never managing to hold down a first team place in two seasons, and was released in May 2010. He was not surprised to learn of his release, and acknowledged that he had not played much in the last season.

=== Farnborough ===
Sankofa signed for Conference South club Farnborough in September 2010.

Sankofa made his Farnborough debut on 18 September 2010, starting the whole game, in a 6–3 loss against Dover Athletic. In his third appearance for the club, he scored his first Farnborough (and his first professionally), in a 4–0 win over Hampton & Richmond Borough on 16 October 2010. He began to established himself in the first team at Farnborough and went on to make 19 appearances and scoring once for the side.

At the end of the 2010–11 season, Sankofa began talks with Farnborough over a new contract.

=== Boreham Wood ===
However, Sankofa opted to leave Farnborough in favour of signing fellow Conference South side Boreham Wood in summer of 2011.

Sankofa made his debut for Boreham Wood in the opening game of the season, in a 1–0 loss against Havant & Waterlooville. He then scored his first goal for Boreham Wood on 25 February 2012, in a 3–0 win over Maidenhead United. Since joining Boreham Wood, he established himself in the starting eleven there and finishing the season, making 36 appearances and scoring once in all competitions.

=== Eastleigh ===
In May 2012, Sanfoka moved to Conference South rivals Eastleigh signing on an initial one-year deal.

Sankofa made his Eastleigh debut on 4 September 2012, in a 1–0 loss against Dorchester Town. He then scored his first goal for Eastleigh goal on 15 September 2012, in a 2–1 win over Maidenhead United.

However, he was later deemed surplus to requirements under Richard Hill and transfer listed. Shortly after, he left Eastleigh by mutual consent. By the time of his departure, he went on to make 11 appearances and scoring once for the side.

=== Hayes & Yeading United ===
On 8 March 2013, Sankofa joined Conference South side Hayes & Yeading United.

Sankofa made his Hayes & Yeading United debut, where he started and kept a clean, in a 0–0 draw against Sutton United on 9 March 2013. Since making his Hayes & Yeading debut, he played all the remaining matches towards the end of the season, making 9 appearances for the side.

=== Ebbsfleet United ===
After leaving Hayes & Yeading United, Sankofa joined Ebbsfleet United in the summer of 2013.

Sankofa made his Ebbsfleet United debut in the opening game of the season, in a 0–0 draw against Havant & Waterlooville, keeping the club a clean sheet. Since making his debut for the club, Sankofa became a first team regular at the starting eleven, playing in the defence. After suffering an injury in mid–March, On 5 May 2014, he scored his first goal for the club, in a 4–0 win over Dover Athletic to win the Kent Senior Cup. However, in the last remaining matches of the 2013–14 season, Sankofa was demoted from the first team to the substitute bench.

At the end of the 2013–14 season, he was released by the club. By the time of his departure, Sankofa made 30 appearances and scoring once in all competitions.

=== Whitehawk ===
After leaving Ebbsfleet United, Sankofa joined Whitehawk.

Sankofa made his Whitehawk debut in the opening game of the season, starting the whole game in a 2–1 loss against Staines Town. On 23 August 2014, he scored his first goal for the club, in a 1–0 win against his former club, Ebbsfleet United. Since making his Whitehawk debut, he established himself in the starting eleven for the side. He then scored his second goal for the club, in a 3–2 win over St Albans City on 8 November 2014. He later scored again on 16 December 2014, in a 1–1 draw against Weston-super-Mare. Towards the end of the season, he helped the side win the Parafix Sussex Senior Cup after beating Lewes 4–0.

At the end of the 2014–15 season, he went on to make 31 appearances and scoring 3 times in all competitions. The club decided to let him go after Sankofa took up a coaching role at Ebbsfleet United.

=== Dulwich Hamlet ===
Following spells with Ebbsfleet United and Whitehawk, Sankofa signed forms with Isthmian League Premier side Dulwich Hamlet ahead of the 2015–16 season. It came after when he was appointed as a youth coach for the under-9 to under-12 age groups.

He made his Dulwich Hamlet debut in the opening game of the season, starting the whole game, in a 2–1 win over Hayes & Yeading United. After making 30 appearances for Dulwich Hamlet in his first season, Sankofa left the club at the end of the 2015–16 season.

== International career ==
His father was born in Jamaica and his mother was born in England of Jamaican descent, making him eligible to play for Jamaica and England.

He has been capped for England for every age group from under-16 to under-20.

== Personal life ==
Born and raised in Brixton, London, his parents were separated when he was at a young age and spent much times with his grandparents. Sankofa attended Graveney School until the age of 16. Despite missing school out of his football commitment, he nevertheless received "above average results", with all 10 GCSEs including 2 A*s and 2 As.

In February 2012, Sankofa was involved in the "Show Racism the Red Card" campaign, along with Nyron Nosworthy, John Eustace, Graham Taylor and Paul Mortimer.
