= Glenn Poole =

English footballer & coach (born 1981)

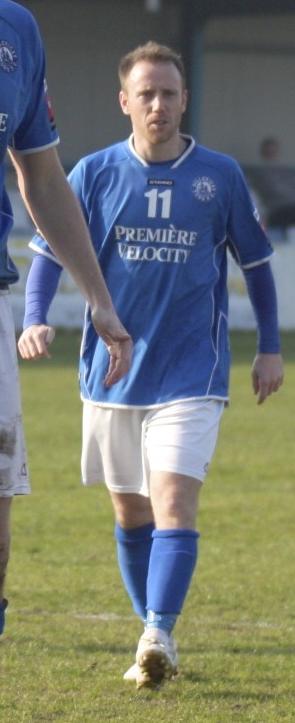
- Poole playing for Billericay Town in 2012.

Personal information
- Full name: Glenn Stephen Poole
- Date of birth: 3 February 1981 (age 45)
- Place of birth: Barking, England
- Height: 5 ft 7 in (1.70 m)
- Position: Midfielder

Team information
- Current team: Grays Athletic

Youth career
- 1997–1999: Tottenham Hotspur

Senior career*
| Years | Team | Apps | (Gls) |
| 1999–2002 | Yeovil Town | 19 | (0) |
| 2001 | → Bath City (loan) | 1 | (0) |
| 2002–2004 | Ford United | 80 | (33) |
| 2004–2005 | Thurrock | 25 | (12) |
| 2005–2007 | Grays Athletic | 75 | (19) |
| 2007 | → Rochdale (loan) | 6 | (0) |
| 2007–2009 | Brentford | 71 | (19) |
| 2009 | Grays Athletic | 15 | (2) |
| 2010 | AFC Wimbledon | 17 | (3) |
| 2010–2011 | Barnet | 10 | (1) |
| 2011 | Braintree Town | 16 | (3) |
| 2011 | Thurrock | 17 | (2) |
| 2011–2015 | Billericay Town | 151 | (30) |
| 2015 | Canvey Island | 25 | (2) |
| 2015–2016 | Billericay Town | | (2) |
| 2016–2017 | Thurrock | 43 | (4) |
| 2017– | Grays Athletic | 25 | (2) |
- * Club domestic league appearances and goals as of 18:28, 24 July 2019 (UTC)

Glenn Stephen Poole (born 3 February 1981) is an English footballer and player-coach for Grays Athletic in the Isthmian League North Division.

== Career ==
Poole, a left winger who can also play in central midfield, started his career as a junior at Tottenham Hotspur. He was not offered a professional deal at White Hart Lane and after being released he joined Yeovil Town. Poole failed to establish himself at Huish Park and, after a loan spell at Bath City, he dropped further down into non-League football to sign for Ford United (who went on to change their name to Redbridge). His impressive goalscoring record at Ford (averaging over one goal every three games from midfield) caught the attention of Conference South side Thurrock whom he signed for in July 2004. After a season at Thurrock, he then moved to their local rivals Grays Athletic, in 2005. Poole played 75 league games for Grays, scoring 19 goals in the process. He also scored one of the goals as Grays won the 2005–06 FA Trophy Final.

Poole was signed by new Brentford manager Terry Butcher on 19 May 2007 on a free transfer in a two-year deal. Brentford beat off competition from several other clubs for Poole's signature. He had a very successful first season, ending as Brentford's top goalscorer, despite playing in midfield. In addition, his volley against Wycombe Wanderers on Boxing Day 2007 earned Poole the "Goal of the Season" award.

His second season at Brentford was less successful, as he lost his place in the team to Sam Wood from December 2008. Poole was released at the end of the 2008–09 season.

On 12 January 2010, Poole signed for AFC Wimbledon until the end of the 2009–10 season. He was released by AFC Wimbledon at the end of the season. He signed for League Two club Barnet on 14 June 2010 and scored on his debut at Chesterfield on the opening day of the season. Poole was released by Barnet on 31 January 2011, and subsequently joined Conference South club Braintree Town on 3 February 2011. However, he left the club on 30 June after, turning down a new contract offer, and rejoined Thurrock for the start of the 2011–12 season.

He signed for Billericay Town in December 2011. Here he claimed another trophy as Billericay won the Isthmian League Premier Division that season. He had a more central role for the club in midfield. He scored six goals in 22 appearances in the 2011–12 season for Billericay Town. In the 2013–14 campaign, after the transfer of Rob Swaine to Bromley, Poole became the captain of Billericay. He left Billericay in the summer of 2015 and joined local rivals Canvey Island, making 30 appearances in all competitions before leaving in December 2015.

== Career statistics ==
Appearances and goals by club, season and competition
| Club | Season | League | | | FA Cup | | League Cup | | Other | | Total | |
| Club | Season | Division | Apps | Goals | Apps | Goals | Apps | Goals | Apps | Goals | Apps | Goals |
|---|---|---|---|---|---|---|---|---|---|---|---|---|
| Yeovil Town | 1999–2000 | Conference | 11 | 0 | 0 | 0 | ― | | 5 (Note: 2 appearances in FA Trophy, 2 appearances in Somerset Premier Cup, 1 appearance and 1 goal in Conference League Cup) | 1 | 16 | 1 |
| Yeovil Town | 2000–01 | Conference | 6 | 0 | 0 | 0 | ― | | 8 (Note: 4 appearances and 1 goal in Conference League Cup, 3 appearances and 1 goal in FA Trophy, 1 appearance in Somerset Premier Cup) | 2 | 14 | 2 |
| Yeovil Town | 2001–02 | Conference | 2 | 0 | 0 | 0 | ― | | 1 (Note: Appearance in Somerset Premier Cup) | 0 | 3 | 0 |
| Yeovil Town | Total | | 19 | 0 | 0 | 0 | ― | | 14 | 3 | 33 | 3 |
| Grays Athletic | 2005–06 | Conference Premier | 39 | 13 | 3 | 1 | ― | | 10 (Note: 7 appearances and 5 goals in FA Trophy, 3 appearances and 2 goals in Essex Senior Cup) | 7 | 52 | 21 |
| Grays Athletic | 2006–07 | Conference Premier | 36 | 6 | 1 | 0 | ― | | 5 (Note: Appearances in FA Trophy) | 1 | 42 | 7 |
| Grays Athletic | Total | | 75 | 19 | 4 | 1 | ― | | 15 | 8 | 94 | 28 |
| Rochdale (loan) | 2006–07 | League Two | 6 | 0 | ― | | ― | | ― | | 6 | 0 |
| Brentford | 2007–08 | League Two | 45 | 14 | 2 | 0 | 0 | 0 | 1 (Note: Appearance in Football League Trophy) | 0 | 48 | 14 |
| Brentford | 2008–09 | League Two | 26 | 5 | 1 | 0 | 1 | 0 | 2 | 2 | 30 | 7 |
| Brentford | Total | | 71 | 19 | 3 | 0 | 1 | 0 | 3 | 2 | 78 | 21 |
| Grays Athletic | 2009–10 | Conference Premier | 15 | 2 | 1 | 0 | ― | | 2 (Note: 1 appearance in FA Trophy, 1 appearance in Essex Senior Cup) | 0 | 18 | 2 |
| AFC Wimbledon | 2009–10 | Conference Premier | 17 | 3 | ― | | ― | | 2 (Note: 1 appearance and 2 goals in Surrey Senior Cup, 1 appearance in London Senior Cup) | 2 | 19 | 5 |
| Barnet | 2010–11 | League Two | 10 | 1 | 0 | 0 | 1 | 0 | 0 | 0 | 11 | 1 |
| Billericay Town | 2011–12 | Isthmian League Premier Division | 22 | 6 | 0 | 0 | ― | | 0 | 0 | 22 | 6 |
| Billericay Town | 2012–13 | Conference South | 37 | 12 | 0 | 0 | ― | | 0 | 0 | 37 | 12 |
| Billericay Town | Total | | 59 | 18 | 0 | 0 | ― | | 0 | 0 | 59 | 18 |
| Canvey Island | 2015–16 | Isthmian League Premier Division | 23 | 3 | 1 | 0 | ― | | 2 | 0 | 26 | 3 |
| Grays Athletic | 2017–18 | Isthmian League North Division | 25 | 2 | 0 | 0 | ― | | 4 (Note: 2 appearances in FA Trophy, 1 appearance in Isthmian League Cup, 1 appearance in Essex Senior Cup) | 0 | 29 | 2 |
| Grays Athletic | Total | | 115 | 26 | 5 | 1 | ― | | 23 | 8 | 143 | 35 |
| Career total | | | 320 | 70 | 9 | 1 | 1 | 0 | 42 | 15 | 372 | 86 |

== Honours ==
Grays Athletic

- FA Trophy: 2005–06

Brentford

- Football League Two: 2008–09

Billericay Town

- Isthmian League Premier Division: 2011–12
