= 2018 Nordic Under-17 Football Championship =

Tournament details
- Host country: Faroe Islands
- Dates: 5–11 August 2018
- Teams: 8 (from 2 confederations)
- Venues: 3

Final positions
- Champions: Iceland
- Runners-up: Finland
- Third place: Denmark
- Fourth place: Norway

Tournament statistics
- Matches played: 16

The 2018 Nordic Under-17 Football Championship was the 42nd edition of the Nordic Under-17 Football Championship. It was held in Faroe Islands from 5 to 11 August 2018.

== Participants ==
- China
- Denmark
- Faroe Islands
- Finland
- Iceland
- Northern Ireland
- Norway
- Sweden

== Group stage ==
=== Group A ===
Pos	Team	Pld	W	D	L	GF	GA	GD	Pts
1	Finland	3	2	1	0	7	2	+5	7
2	Denmark	3	2	1	0	3	1	+2	7
3	Sweden	3	1	0	2	4	6	−2	3
4	Northern Ireland	3	0	0	3	1	6	−5	0

Source: Result

=== Group B ===
Pos	Team	Pld	W	D	L	GF	GA	GD	Pts
1	Iceland	3	3	0	0	7	2	+5	9
2	Norway	3	2	0	1	4	2	+2	6
3	Faroe Islands	3	0	1	2	2	5	−3	1
4	China	3	0	1	2	1	5	−4	1

Source: Result
