= Craig Stone =

English footballer (born 1988)

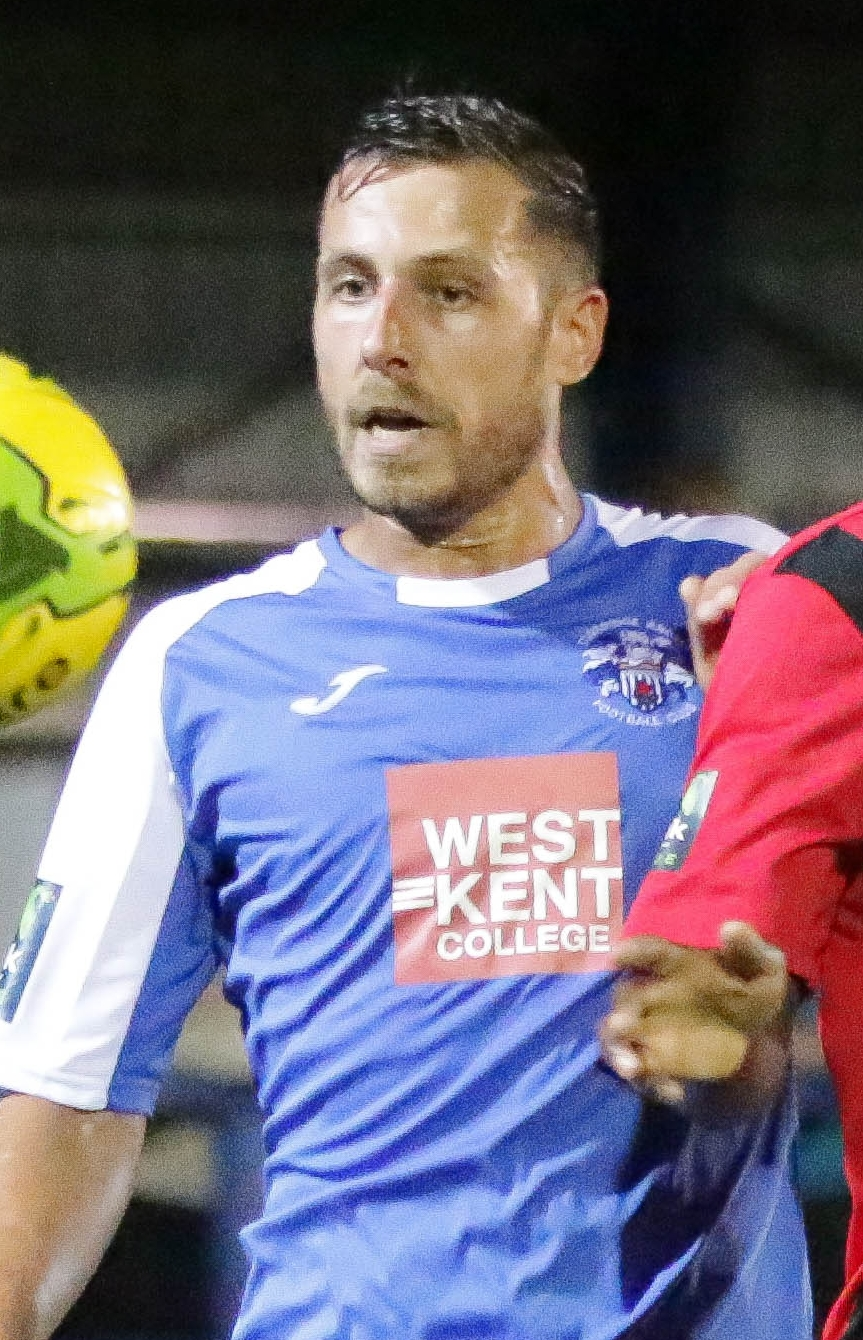
- Stone playing for Tonbridge Angels in 2018.

Personal information
- Full name: Craig Brian Raymond Stone
- Date of birth: 29 December 1988 (age 37)
- Place of birth: Gravesend, England
- Height: 1.83 m (6 ft 0 in)
- Position: Midfielder

Team information
- Current team: Ashford United (interim player-manager)

Youth career
- –2007: Gillingham

Senior career*
Years	Team	Apps	(Gls)
2005–2008	Gillingham	15	(0)
2008	→ Brentford (loan)	6	(0)
2008–2009	Ebbsfleet United	23	(0)
2010	Maidstone United	4	(0)
2010–2013	Ebbsfleet United	112	(1)
2013–2015	Dover Athletic	62	(1)
2015–2017	Eastbourne Borough	79	(2)
2017–2019	Tonbridge Angels	32	(0)
2019	→ Grays Athletic (loan)	5	(0)
2019–2023	Hastings United	41	(3)
2023–2024	Ramsgate	30	(4)
2024–	Ashford United	42	(4)

Managerial career
- 2019–2021: Gillingham (U18/U23)
- 2025–: Ashford United (interim player-manager)
- * Club domestic league appearances and goals as of 11:47, 1 December 2025 (UTC)

Craig Brian Raymond Stone (born 29 December 1988) is an English footballer who plays for Ashford United, where he is also interim player-manager. He came through the Gillingham youth ranks, making his league debut as a 16-year-old in the 2005–06 season, and plays in central midfield or at right-back.

== Career ==
Stone joined Gillingham at the age of 10 and made his first appearance for the club in a 3–1 victory over Hartlepool United on 1 November 2005. He signed his first professional contract in May 2007, a one-year deal with an option of another year.

On 17 January 2008, Stone joined Brentford on a one-month loan, which was later extended for a second month. On his return to Priestfield Stadium he still could not command a regular place in the team and he was released at the end of his contract and joined non-League club Ebbsfleet United in time for the 2008–09 season. On 21 February 2009, he broke his leg in a match against Wrexham and was expected to miss the remainder of the season. A group of Ebbsfleet supporters got together to help Stone pass the time whilst out injured by purchasing a PlayStation 3.

In February 2010, Stone joined Isthmian League club Maidstone United in a bid to regain fitness before returning to the professional game. He joined up with The Stones' caretaker management team of Pete Nott and Tony Cornwell, who coached him as a youngster. In August of the same year, he re-joined Ebbsfleet United.

In June 2015, Stone signed a two-year deal to join Eastbourne Borough of the National League South. He was released at the end of his contract and dropped back down to the Isthmian League Premier Division to join Tonbridge Angels in May 2017. He left Tonbridge at the end of the 2018–19 season, having helped them to achieve promotion to the National League South.

On leaving Tonbridge, he was scheduled to take up a player-coach role at Hastings United, but he was subsequently offered the role of manager of the U18 and U23 teams at Gillingham, where he had already been coaching at the girls' academy. He departed Gillingham in October 2021.

In May 2023, Stone was promoted to the role of player-assistant manager at Hastings United. In November 2023, he dropped down a division to sign for Ramsgate.

In May 2024, Stone joined Ashford United. On 29 November 2025, he was appointed interim player-manager.
