= List of footballers with 500 or more Premier League appearances =

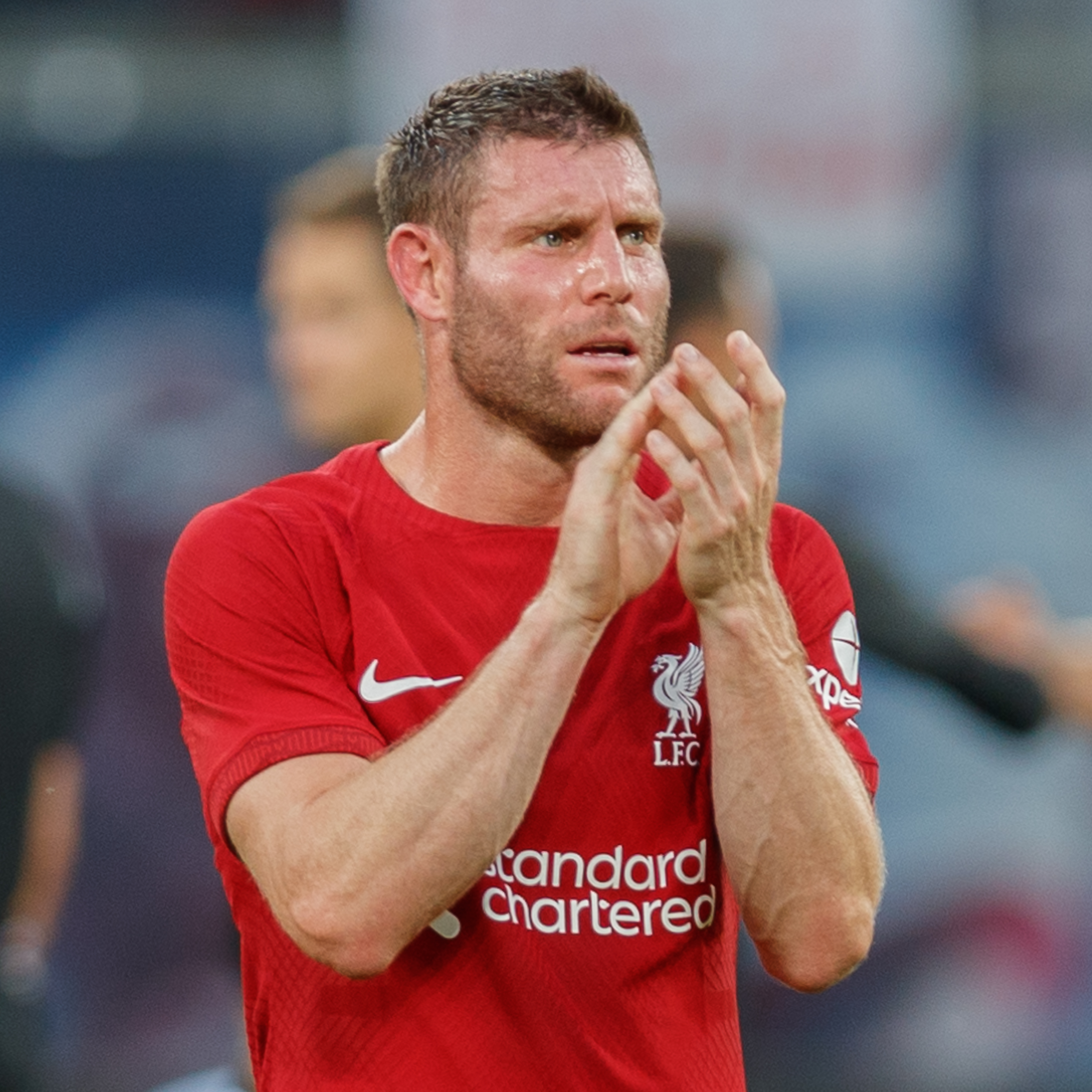
James Milner is the player with the most Premier League appearances in history.

Since the Premier League's formation at the start of the 1992–93 season, 13 players have accrued 500 or more appearances in the Premier League. The first player to reach the milestone was midfielder Gary Speed, in representation of Leeds United, Everton, Newcastle United and Bolton Wanderers; his 500th match was Bolton's 4–0 win over West Ham United on 9 December 2006. Speed held the record for most appearances until 14 February 2009, when goalkeeper David James played his 536th match, for Portsmouth against his former team Manchester City. James ended with 572 appearances, a record which was broken by Ryan Giggs on 14 May 2011, having played all of his matches for Manchester United. On 25 September 2017, Gareth Barry broke Giggs' record by playing his 633rd match, West Bromwich Albion's 2–0 loss at Arsenal. Barry is the youngest of the 13 players to have achieved the feat.

Giggs (Manchester United), Steven Gerrard, and Jamie Carragher (both Liverpool) are the only three players to have achieved the accolade of 500+ Premier League appearances exclusively for one club. James Milner played for six clubs, which is the most of anyone in the "500 Club". Emile Heskey and David James each played for five Premier League clubs on their way to over 500 Premier League games. The only player from outside the United Kingdom to play 500 Premier League games is Australian goalkeeper Mark Schwarzer, for Middlesbrough, Fulham, Chelsea and Leicester City.

Of the still active players in the Premier League, Jordan Henderson is closest to joining the "500 Club". The Chelsea midfielder has 463 Premier League appearances as of 24 May 2026 (71 for Sunderland, 360 for Liverpool and 31 for Brentford).

== List of players ==
Players are initially listed by number of appearances. If number of appearances are equal, the players are then listed chronologically by the year of first appearance. Current Premier League players and their current clubs are shown in bold.

Statistics were updated as of 24 May 2026.

Premier League players with at least 500 appearances
Rank	Player	Nat.	Pos	Apps	First	Last	Club(s)
1	James Milner	(England)	MF	658	2002	2026	Liverpool (230), Manchester City (147), Aston Villa (100), Newcastle United (94), Leeds United (48), Brighton & Hove Albion (39)
2	Gareth Barry	(England)	MF	653	1998	2018	Aston Villa (365), Manchester City (132), Everton (131), West Bromwich Albion (25)
3	Ryan Giggs	(Wales)	MF	632	1992	2014	Manchester United (632)
4	Frank Lampard	(England)	MF	609	1996	2015	Chelsea (429), West Ham United (148), Manchester City (32)
5	David James	(England)	GK	572	1992	2010	Liverpool (214), Portsmouth (134), Manchester City (93), Aston Villa (67), West Ham United (64)
6	Gary Speed	(Wales)	MF	535	1992	2007	Newcastle United (213), Leeds United (143), Bolton Wanderers (121), Everton (58)
7	Emile Heskey	(England)	FW	516	1995	2012	Liverpool (150), Leicester City (124), Aston Villa (92), Wigan Athletic (82), Birmingham City (68)
8	Mark Schwarzer	(Australia)	GK	514	1997	2015	Middlesbrough (332), Fulham (172), Leicester City (6), Chelsea (4)
9	Jamie Carragher	(England)	DF	508	1997	2013	Liverpool (508)
10	Phil Neville	(England)	DF	505	1995	2013	Manchester United (263), Everton (242)
11	Rio Ferdinand	(England)	DF	504	1996	2015	Manchester United (312), West Ham United (127), Leeds United (54), Queens Park Rangers (11)
11	Steven Gerrard	(England)	MF	504	1998	2015	Liverpool (504)
13	Sol Campbell	(England)	DF	503	1992	2011	Tottenham Hotspur (255), Arsenal (146), Portsmouth (95), Newcastle United (7)

== Most appearances by club ==
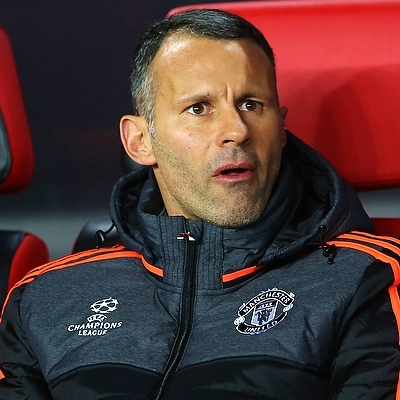
Ryan Giggs has the most Premier League appearances for one club.

Current Premier League clubs and players who hold the record for the club are shown in bold, defunct clubs are in italics.

As of 21 September 2026

Rank	Club	Player	Nat.	Apps	First	Last
1	**Manchester United**	Ryan Giggs	(Wales)	632	1992	2014
2	**Liverpool**	Jamie Carragher	(England)	508	1997	2013
3	**Chelsea**	John Terry	(England)	492	1998	2017
4	West Ham United	Mark Noble	(England)	414	2005	2022
5	Bolton Wanderers	Jussi Jääskeläinen	(Finland)	379	2001	2011
6	**Everton**	Séamus Coleman	(Republic of Ireland)	374	2009	2026
7	**Aston Villa**	Gareth Barry	(England)	365	1998	2009
8	**Tottenham Hotspur**	Hugo Lloris	(France)	361	2012	2023
9	**Newcastle United**	Shay Given	(Republic of Ireland)	354	1997	2009
10	Southampton	James Ward-Prowse	(England)	343	2012	2023
11	Leicester City	Jamie Vardy	(England)	342	2014	2025
12	**Arsenal**	Ray Parlour	(England)	333	1992	2004
13	Middlesbrough	Mark Schwarzer	(Australia)	332	1997	2008
14	**Leeds United**	Gary Kelly	(Republic of Ireland)	325	1993	2004
15	Stoke City	Ryan Shawcross	(England)	317	2008	2018
16	**Manchester City**	David Silva	(Spain)	309	2010	2020
17	**Crystal Palace**	Joel Ward	(England)	306	2013	2025
18	**Brighton & Hove Albion**	**Lewis Dunk**	(England)	303	2017	2026
19	West Bromwich Albion	Chris Brunt	(Northern Ireland)	269	2008	2018
20	Sheffield Wednesday	Des Walker	(England)	264	1993	2000
21	Blackburn Rovers	Brad Friedel	(United States)	261	2001	2008
22	**Bournemouth**	**Adam Smith**	(England)	260	2015	2026
23	Wimbledon	Robbie Earle	(Jamaica)	244	1992	2000
24	**Fulham**	Brede Hangeland	(Norway)	217	2008	2014
24	Burnley	Ben Mee	(England)	217	2014	2022
26	Swansea City	Wayne Routledge	(England)	198	2011	2018
27	Wigan Athletic	Emmerson Boyce	(Barbados)	194	2006	2013
28	**Coventry City**	Steve Ogrizovic Paul Telfer	(England) (Scotland)	191	1992 1995	2000 2001
29	**Sunderland**	John O'Shea	(Republic of Ireland)	189	2011	2017
30	Charlton Athletic	Chris Powell Luke Young	(England) (England)	187	1998 2001	2006 2007
31	Wolverhampton Wanderers	Rúben Neves	(Portugal)	177	2018	2023
32	**Nottingham Forest**	Steve Chettle	(England)	174	1992	1999
33	Derby County	Darryl Powell	(Jamaica)	170	1996	2002
34	**Brentford**	**Vitaly Janelt**	(Germany)	166	2021	2026
35	Watford	Troy Deeney	(England)	165	2015	2021
36	Birmingham City	Damien Johnson	(Northern Ireland)	150	2002	2009
37	Portsmouth	Matthew Taylor	(England)	144	2003	2008
38	Queens Park Rangers	Andy Impey	(England)	142	1992	1996
39	Norwich City	Russell Martin	(Scotland)	125	2011	2016
40	**Ipswich Town**	David Linighan	(England)	112	1992	1995
41	**Hull City**	Ahmed Elmohamady	(Egypt)	109	2013	2017
42	Sheffield United	Oliver Norwood	(Northern Ireland)	97	2019	2024
43	Reading	Nicky Shorey	(England)	90	2006	2013
44	Oldham Athletic	Mike Milligan	(Republic of Ireland)	81	1992	1994
45	Huddersfield Town	Christopher Schindler	(Germany)	74	2017	2019
46	Bradford City	Stuart McCall	(Scotland)	71	1999	2001
47	Cardiff City	Aron Gunnarsson	(Iceland)	51	2013	2019
Minimum 50 appearances

== See also ==
- List of footballers in England by number of league appearances (500+)
- List of footballers with 100 or more Premier League goals
