= John Mackie (footballer, born 1976) =

English footballer (born 1976)

Personal information
- Full name: John George Mackie
- Date of birth: 5 July 1976 (age 50)
- Place of birth: Whitechapel, England
- Height: 6 ft 0 in (1.83 m)
- Position: Defender

Youth career
- West Ham United

Senior career*
Years	Team	Apps	(Gls)
1994–1995	Kingsbury Town	0	(0)
1995–1999	Crawley Town	126	(5)
1999	Sutton United	8	(0)
1999–2004	Reading	71	(3)
1999	→ Sutton United (loan)	1	(0)
2004–2007	Leyton Orient	122	(11)
2007–2008	Brentford	14	(0)
2008	A.F.C. Hornchurch	4	(0)
2008–2009	Hertford Town	0	(0)
Total		347	(19)

Managerial career
- 2021–2022: Walthamstow (joint-manager)
- 2022: FC Romania (joint-manager)
- * Club domestic league appearances and goals

John George Mackie (born 5 July 1976) is an English former professional footballer who played as a central defender, notably for Reading and Leyton Orient. He was most recently joint manager of FC Romania.

== Playing career ==
Mackie was born in London and played football both for his school and for the Area London School Boys team. His dream was to play for Arsenal with whom he had a try out, but was unsuccessful. Later he gained an apprenticeship at West Ham United. At the end of his two-year apprenticeship Mackie was released by West Ham and he started work on a fruit and veg stall while playing for a pub team and Kingsbury Town. He joined Crawley Town in 1995, playing in the Southern League Premier Division. In 1999 he was signed by, then Reading manager, Alan Pardew and joined the then Second Division club. Pardew immediately loaned Mackie out to Sutton United to gain more experience before he start playing for Reading on a semi-regular basis. In his time at Reading Mackie got to play against Chelsea in a League Cup game where the opposition strike force that night consisted of Hernan Crespo.

Mackie's time came to an end at Reading in January 2004 when he signed for Leyton Orient.

In the 2005–06 season, Mackie made a formidable partnership for Leyton Orient with Gabriel Zakuani and went down in Orient folklore by captaining the Os to their first automatic promotion in 36 years. He was released by the club at the end of the 2006–07 season.

On 16 May 2007, he signed for Brentford on a two-year contract. Two days after signing for the Bees, it was announced that Mackie would be Brentford captain for the 2007–08 season. However, Mackie only made 14 league appearances for the club before leaving by mutual consent. He signed for A.F.C. Hornchurch on 18 January 2008, he has since retired from the game and now runs a greengrocers on Blackstock Road in North London. On 7 August 2008, Mackie signed for Hertford Town in a semi-professional capacity, but did not make an appearance.

== Coaching career ==
Mackie reunited with former Leyton Orient manager Martin Ling in June 2015, as a youth coach at Hertfordshire Senior County League club Lings Elite.

Mackie was appointed assistant manager of Greenwich Borough in December 2015.

Mackie was appointed assistant manager of Potters Bar Town in May 2019.

In April 2021, Mackie was appointed joint-manager of Essex Senior League club Walthamstow with Terry Spillane. The 2021–22 season saw the management duo lead Walthamstow to the Essex Senior League title, their first league title in 37 years. On 15 September 2022, Mackie and Spillane were sacked by the club.

On 29 September 2022, Mackie was appointed joint manager of FC Romania, again with Terry Spillane. Mackie left the club on 31 October 2022.

== Career statistics ==
Appearances and goals by club, season and competition
Club	Season	League			FA Cup		League Cup		Other		Total	
Club	Season	Division	Apps	Goals	Apps	Goals	Apps	Goals	Apps	Goals	Apps	Goals
Crawley Town	1995–96	Southern League Premier Division	25	0	—		—		10 (Note: 5 appearances in Southern League Cup, 4 appearances in Sussex Senior Cup, 1 appearance in FA Trophy)	0	35	0
Crawley Town	1996–97	Southern League Premier Division	30	0	2	0	—		4 (Note: 2 appearances in Southern League Cup, 1 appearance in FA Trophy, 1 appearance in Sussex Senior Cup)	0	36	0
Crawley Town	1997–98	Southern League Premier Division	35	3	1	0	—		6 (Note: 3 appearances in Southern League Cup, 2 appearances and 1 goal in FA Trophy, 1 appearance in Sussex Senior Cup)	1	42	4
Crawley Town	1998–99	Southern League Premier Division	36	2	4	0	—		10 (Note: 5 appearances in Sussex Floodlight Cup, 2 appearances and 1 goal in FA Trophy, 2 appearances in Southern League Cup, 2 appearances in Sussex Senior Cup)	1	50	3
Crawley Town	Total		126	5	7	0	—		30	2	163	7
Sutton United	1999–2000	Conference	8	0	0	0	—		0	0	8	0
Reading	2000–01	Second Division	10	0	3	0	2	0	1 (Note: Appearance(s) in Football League Trophy)	0	16	0
Reading	2001–02	Second Division	27	2	2	0	0	0	2	0	31	2
Reading	2002–03	First Division	25	0	2	0	1	0	0	0	28	0
Reading	2003–04	First Division	9	1	0	0	1	0	—		0	0
Reading	Total		71	3	7	0	4	0	3	0	85	3
Sutton United (loan)	1999–2000	Conference	1	0	—		—		—		1	0
Leyton Orient	2003–04	Third Division	20	1	0	0	0	0	—		20	1
Leyton Orient	2004–05	League Two	27	4	1	0	0	0	3	0	31	4
Leyton Orient	2005–06	League Two	40	6	4	1	1	0	1	0	46	7
Leyton Orient	2006–07	League One	35	0	2	0	0	0	1	0	38	0
Leyton Orient	Total		122	11	7	1	1	0	5	0	135	12
Brentford	2007–08	League Two	14	0	1	0	1	0	0	0	16	0
A.F.C. Hornchurch	2007–08	Isthmian League Premier Division	5	0	—		—		—		5	0
Career total			347	19	22	1	6	0	38	2	413	22

== Honours ==
Crawley Town

- Sussex Floodlight Cup: 1998–99

Reading

- Football League Second Division second-place promotion: 2001–02

Leyton Orient

- Football League Two third-place promotion: 2005–06
