= 2001–02 Swindon Town F.C. season =

- Chairman: Danny Donegan; Willie Carson
- Manager: Andy King; Roy Evans; Andy King
- Ground: County Ground, Swindon
- Division Two: 13th
- FA Cup: 3rd Round
- League Cup: 2nd Round
- FL Trophy: 1st Round (South)
- Top goalscorer: League: Giuliano Grazioli (8); All: Giuliano Grazioli (8); Danny Invincibile (8)
- Highest home attendance: 8,830 (vs. Brighton & Hove Albion)
- Lowest home attendance: 3,821 (vs. Notts County)
Home colours	Away colours	Third colours

The 2001–02 season was Swindon Town's second season in the Division Two since their relegation from the second tier of English football in 2000. Alongside the league campaign, Swindon Town also competed in the FA Cup, League Cup and the Football League Trophy.

== Nationwide League Division Two ==
Brighton earned a second successive championship, despite the loss of manager Micky Adams early in the season - however, they would also have to cope with the loss of replacement manager Peter Taylor after the season ended. Reading earned the runners-up spot after four seasons in Division Two, and the play-offs were won by Stoke City who, despite this success, sacked manager Gudjon Thordarson immediately afterwards (leaving Reading in the odd position of being the only top six side to start the 2002–03 season with the same manager that they had at the start of the 2001–02 season).

QPR came out of administration at the end of a season where they finished a respectable eighth in their first campaign at this level since the 1960s, featuring in the race for a playoff place until the penultimate game of the season. Wigan Athletic finished a disappointing 10th after successive playoff appearances, but kept faith in manager Paul Jewell to deliver promotion in his second season at the helm.

Cambridge United were cut adrift early in the season, and never looked to have much chance of surviving. Long-time Division Two members Wrexham never recovered from a bad start, and also went down. Bury suffered a financial crisis off the pitch and the effects of this ultimately affected the team's performance and sent them down to the League's bottom tier. The final relegation spot was filled by Bournemouth.

Pos	Team	Pld	W	D	L	GF	GA	GD	Pts
11	Wycombe Wanderers	46	17	13	16	58	64	−6	64
12	Tranmere Rovers	46	16	15	15	63	60	+3	63
13	Swindon Town	46	15	14	17	46	56	−10	59
14	Port Vale	46	16	10	20	51	62	−11	58
15	Colchester United	46	15	12	19	65	76	−11	57

Rules for classification: In the Football League goals scored (GF) takes precedence over goal difference (GD).

Leading goalscorer: Bobby Zamora (Brighton and Hove Albion) - 28

== Results and matchday squads ==
=== Division Two line-ups ===
Date	Opposition	V	Score	1	2	3	4	5	6	7	8	9	10	11	12	13	14	15	16
11/08/01	Peterborough United	H	0–0	Griemink	Gurney	Duke	Reeves	Heywood	Howe_{1}	O'Halloran	Hewlett	Invincibile_{3}	Sabin_{2}	Grazioli	S.Robinson_{1}	Davis_{2}	Brayley_{3}	Ruddock	McKinney
18/08/01	Bristol City	A	1–3	Griemink	Gurney	Duke	Reeves	Heywood	S.Robinson_{3}	O'Halloran	Hewlett	Invincibile_{1}	Sabin	Grazioli_{2}	Davis_{1}	Howe_{2}	Brayley_{3}	Ruddock	McKinney
25/08/01	Oldham Athletic	H	0–2	Griemink	Gurney	Davis	Reeves	Heywood	Howe_{2}	O'Halloran	Hewlett	Invincibile	Sabin	Duke_{1}	Kuffour_{1}	Brayley_{2}	Cobian	Ruddock	McKinney
27/08/01	Bury	A	3–0	Griemink	Gurney	Davis_{1}	Reeves	Heywood	Howe	O'Halloran	Hewlett	Kuffour_{2}	Sabin	Duke	Invincibile_{1}	Brayley_{2}	McAreavey	Ruddock	McKinney
01/09/01	Colchester United	H	1–0	Griemink	Gurney	Davis	Ruddock	Heywood	Howe	O'Halloran	Hewlett	Kuffour_{2}	Sabin_{3}	Duke_{1}	S.Robinson_{1}	Invincibile_{2}	Davies_{3}	P.Edwards	McKinney
08/09/01	Bournemouth	A	0–0	Griemink	Gurney	Davis	Ruddock	Heywood	Howe	O'Halloran_{1}	Hewlett	Kuffour	S.Robinson	Duke_{2}	Grazioli_{1}	Invincibile_{2}	P.Edwards	Reeves	McKinney
15/09/01	Tranmere Rovers	H	2–2	Griemink	Gurney	Duke	Ruddock	Heywood	Howe	S.Robinson	Hewlett	Invincibile	Kuffour_{1}	Grazioli_{1}	P.Edwards_{1}	Brayley_{2}	Reeves_{3}	McAreavey	McKinney
18/09/01	Port Vale	A	2–0	Griemink	Gurney	Duke	Ruddock_{1}	Reeves	Howe	S.Robinson	Hewlett	Invincibile	Grazioli	P.Edwards_{2}	Heywood_{1}	McAreavey_{2}	Kuffour	Brayley	McKinney
22/09/01	Chesterfield	A	0–4	Griemink	Gurney_{3}	Duke_{1}	Reeves	Heywood	Howe	S.Robinson	Hewlett	Invincibile	Grazioli_{2}	P.Edwards	Kuffour_{1}	Brayley_{2}	Davies_{3}	McAreavey	McKinney
25/09/01	Brentford	H	2–0	Griemink	Gurney	Duke	Reeves	Heywood	Howe	S.Robinson	Hewlett	Invincibile	Grazioli	P.Edwards	Kuffour	Brayley	Davies	McAreavey	McKinney
29/09/01	Northampton Town	A	1–1	Griemink	Gurney	Duke	Reeves	Heywood	Howe	S.Robinson	Hewlett_{1}	Invincibile	Grazioli_{2}	P.Edwards	Ruddock_{1}	Kuffour_{2}	Brayley	Davies	McKinney
13/10/01	Reading	A	3–1	Griemink	Gurney	Duke	Ruddock	Reeves	Howe	S.Robinson_{2}	Hewlett	Invincibile	Grazioli_{3}	P.Edwards_{1}	Heywood_{1}	McAreavey_{2}	Kuffour_{3}	Carlisle	McKinney
21/10/01	Cardiff City	H	0–3	Griemink	Gurney	Duke	Ruddock	Reeves	Howe	S.Robinson	Hewlett	Invincibile	Grazioli_{1}	P.Edwards	N.Edwards_{1}	Kuffour	Heywood	McAreavey	McKinney
24/10/01	Cambridge United	H	2–0	Griemink	Gurney	Duke_{1}	Ruddock	Reeves	Howe	S.Robinson	Hewlett	Invincibile	Grazioli	P.Edwards	Carlisle_{1}	Kuffour	Heywood	McAreavey	McKinney
27/10/01	Wycombe	A	1–1	Griemink	Willis	Duke	Ruddock	Heywood	S.Robinson	Carlisle	Hewlett	Invincibile	Grazioli_{1}	P.Edwards	Kuffour_{1}	McAreavey_{2}	N.Edwards	Halliday	McKinney
03/11/01	Stoke City	H	0–3	Griemink	Gurney	Duke_{2}	Ruddock	Heywood	Howe	Carlisle	Hewlett	Invincibile	Grazioli_{1}	P.Edwards	Sabin_{1}	Kuffour_{2}	Willis	S.Robinson	McKinney
10/11/01	Blackpool	A	0–1	Griemink	Gurney	Willis_{2}	Ruddock	Heywood	Howe	Carlisle	Hewlett	Invincibile	Sabin_{3}	Grazioli_{1}	McAreavey_{1}	M.Robinson_{2}	Brayley_{3}	Halliday	McKinney
20/11/01	QPR	A	0–4	Griemink	Gurney	Duke	Ruddock	Heywood	S.Robinson_{2}	Carlisle	Hewlett	Invincibile	Sabin_{1}	M.Robinson	Grazioli_{1}	Kuffour_{2}	Willis	McAreavey	McKinney
24/11/01	Brighton	H	1–1	Griemink	Gurney	Duke	Ruddock	Heywood	S.Robinson	Carlisle	Hewlett	Invincibile	Sabin	M.Robinson	Willis	Kuffour	Brayley	McAreavey	McKinney
27/11/01	Wrexham	H	3–1	Griemink	Gurney	Duke	Ruddock	Heywood	S.Robinson	Carlisle	Hewlett	Invincibile	Sabin	M.Robinson	Willis	Howe	Brayley	McAreavey	McKinney
01/12/01	Wigan Athletic	A	0–1	Griemink	Gurney	Duke	Willis	Heywood	S.Robinson	Carlisle	Hewlett	Invincibile_{3}	Sabin_{1}	M.Robinson_{2}	Howe_{1}	P.Edwards_{2}	Davis_{3}	McAreavey	McKinney
21/12/01	Notts County	A	1–3	Griemink	Willis	Duke	Ruddock	Heywood	Howe_{3}	Carlisle	S.Robinson	Invincibile	Sabin	P.Edwards_{1}	Davis_{12}	Grazioli_{2}	McAreavey_{3}	Reeves	McKinney
26/12/01	Bournemouth	H	0–0	Griemink	Gurney	Duke_{2}	Reeves	Heywood	Howe	Carlisle_{1}	S.Robinson	Invincibile	Sabin	Grazioli	M.Robinson_{1}	Davis_{2}	Willis	McAreavey	McKinney
29/12/01	Bury	H	3–1	Griemink	Gurney	Duke	Reeves	Heywood	Howe	Carlisle	S.Robinson	Invincibile	Sabin	Grazioli_{1}	McAreavey_{1}	M.Robinson	Davis	Willis	McKinney
13/01/02	Bristol City	H	1–2	Griemink	Willis	Davis	Reeves	Heywood	McAreavey_{2}	S.Robinson	Foley	Invincibile	Sabin_{1}	Duke	Young_{1}	Williams_{2}	M.Robinson	N.Edwards	McKinney
16/01/02	Oldham Athletic	A	0–2	Griemink	Gurney	Duke	Reeves	Heywood	Howe_{1}	S.Robinson	Foley	Invincibile	Sabin	McAreavey	Young_{1}	M.Robinson	Davis	Willis	McKinney
19/01/02	Peterborough United	A	1–1	Griemink	Gurney	Davis_{3}	Reeves	Heywood	M.Robinson	S.Robinson	Foley_{2}	Invincibile	Sabin	Duke_{1}	Willis_{1}	Grazioli_{2}	Howe_{3}	McAreavey	McKinney
23/01/02	Notts County	H	1–0	Griemink	Gurney	Davis	Reeves	Heywood	M.Robinson_{2}	S.Robinson	Foley_{1}	Invincibile	Sabin	Duke	Grazioli_{1}	Willis_{2}	Howe	Young	McKinney
26/01/02	Wrexham	A	2–2	Griemink	Gurney	Davis	Reeves	Heywood	Willis	S.Robinson_{3}	Foley_{1}	Invincibile	Sabin	Duke_{2}	Grazioli_{1}	Hewlett_{2}	Howe_{3}	N.Edwards	McKinney
30/01/02	Colchester United	A	3–1	Griemink	Gurney	Davis	Willis	Heywood	Howe_{3}	S.Robinson	Hewlett_{2}	Invincibile	Sabin	Grazioli_{1}	Foley_{1}	Duke_{2}	McAreavey_{3}	N.Edwards	McKinney
02/02/02	Northampton Town	H	2–1	Griemink	Gurney	Davis	Willis	Heywood	Howe	S.Robinson	Hewlett	Invincibile	Sabin	Grazioli_{1}	Duke_{1}	Foley	McAreavey	N.Edwards	McKinney
05/02/02	Huddersfield Town	H	0–1	Griemink	Gurney	McAreavey	Willis	Heywood	Howe_{2}	S.Robinson_{3}	Hewlett	Invincibile	Sabin	Grazioli_{1}	Duke_{1}	Young_{2}	N.Edwards_{3}	Foley	McKinney
09/02/02	Cardiff City	A	0–3	Griemink	Gurney	Davis	Willis	Heywood	McAreavey_{2}	S.Robinson	Hewlett	Invincibile	Sabin_{1}	Duke_{3}	Foley_{1}	Howe_{2}	Grazioli_{3}	N.Edwards	Farr
14/02/02	Reading	H	0–0	Griemink	Gurney	Davis	Reeves	Heywood	Howe_{2}	S.Robinson	Hewlett	Invincibile	Sabin	Grazioli_{1}	Willis_{1}	McAreavey_{2}	Duke	Young	McKinney
22/02/02	Tranmere Rovers	A	0–0	Griemink	Gurney	McAreavey	Reeves	Heywood	Howe_{2}	S.Robinson	Hewlett	Invincibile	Sabin_{2}	Grazioli	N.Edwards_{1}	Young_{2}	Willis	P.Edwards	Farr
26/02/02	Chesterfield	H	2–1	Griemink	Gurney	McAreavey_{1}	Reeves	Heywood	Howe	S.Robinson	Hewlett	Invincibile	Sabin_{2}	Grazioli	Davis_{1}	P.Edwards_{2}	Willis	Duke	Farr
02/03/02	Port Vale	H	3–0	Griemink	Gurney	Davis	Willis	Heywood	Howe	S.Robinson	Hewlett	Invincibile	Grazioli_{2}	Young_{1}	Duke_{1}	N.Edwards_{2}	P.Edwards	Smith	Farr
05/03/02	Brentford	A	0–2	Griemink	Gurney	Davis	Willis	Heywood	Howe	S.Robinson	Hewlett_{1}	Invincibile	Grazioli_{2}	Duke	Young_{1}	P.Edwards_{2}	Halliday	Smith	Farr
09/03/02	Huddersfield Town	A	0–2	Griemink	Gurney	Duke	Willis	Heywood	Howe_{2}	S.Robinson	Hewlett	Invincibile_{1}	Sabin	Grazioli	Young_{1}	P.Edwards_{2}	Halliday	Herring	McKinney
16/03/02	Wigan Athletic	H	1–1	Griemink	Gurney	Davis_{1}	Willis	Heywood	Howe	S.Robinson	Hewlett	Invincibile_{3}	Sabin_{2}	Young	Duke_{1}	P.Edwards_{2}	McAreavey_{3}	Brayley	McKinney
30/03/02	Blackpool	H	1–0	Griemink	Gurney	Duke	Willis	Heywood	Howe	S.Robinson	Hewlett	Invincibile	Sabin	Young	Brayley	P. Edwards	N.Edwards	Halliday	McKinney
01/04/02	Stoke City	A	0–2	McKinney	Gurney	Willis	Reeves_{3}	Heywood	Howe	N.Edwards	Hewlett	Invincibile	Sabin_{2}	P.Edwards_{1}	Duke_{1}	Young_{2}	Cobian_{3}	S.Robinson	Griemink
06/04/02	QPR	H	0–1	Griemink	Gurney	Duke	Willis	Heywood	Howe	S.Robinson	Hewlett	Invincibile	Sabin	Young	McAreavey_{1}	Reeves_{2}	P.Edwards	N.Edwards	McKinney
09/04/02	Cambridge United	A	2–1	Griemink	Gurney	Duke	Willis	Heywood	McAreavey_{3}	S.Robinson_{1}	Hewlett	Young	Sabin	P.Edwards_{2}	Howe_{1}	Invincibile_{2}	N.Edwards_{3}	Reeves	McKinney
13/04/02	Brighton	A	0–0	Griemink	Gurney	Duke	Reeves	Heywood	Howe	Willis_{2}	Hewlett	Young_{1}	Sabin	P.Edwards	McAreavey_{1}	S.Robinson_{2}	Williams	N.Edwards	McKinney
20/04/02	Wycombe	H	1–1	Griemink	Gurney	Duke	Reeves	Heywood	McAreavey_{1}	N.Edwards	Hewlett	Young	Sabin	P.Edwards	Herring_{1}	Howe	Thomas	S.Robinson	Farr

_{1} 1st Substitution, _{2} 2nd Substitution, _{3} 3rd Substitution.

=== FA Cup line-ups ===
Date	Opposition	V	Score	1	2	3	4	5	6	7	8	9	10	11	12	13	14	15	16
17/11/01	Hartlepool United	H	3–1	Griemink	Gurney	Duke	Ruddock	Heywood	S.Robinson	M.Robinson	Hewlett	Invincibile	Sabin_{2}	Grazioli_{1}	McAreavey_{1}	Brayley_{2}	Willis	Halliday	McKinney
08/12/01	Hereford United	H	3–2	Griemink	P.Edwards	Willis	Ruddock	Heywood	S.Robinson	Carlisle	Howe	Invincibile	Sabin	Duke	M.Robinson_{1}	Davis	Grazioli	McAreavey	McKinney
05/01/02	Manchester City	A	0–2	Griemink	Gurney	Duke	Reeves	Heywood	S.Robinson	Carlisle	Howe_{2}	Invincibile	Sabin	McAreavey_{1}	Davis_{1}	Grazioli_{2}	M.Robinson	Brayley	McKinney

_{1} 1st Substitution, _{2} 2nd Substitution, _{3} 3rd Substitution.

=== League Cup line-ups ===
Date	Opposition	V	Score	1	2	3	4	5	6	7	8	9	10	11	12	13	14	15	16
22/08/01	Wolves	A	2–1	Griemink	Gurney	Davis	Reeves	Heywood	Hewlett	O'Halloran	Howe	Invincibile_{1}	Sabin	Duke	Grazioli_{1}	Brayley_{2}	P.Edwards	Davies	McKinney
11/09/01	West Bromwich Albion	A	0–2	Griemink	Gurney	Davis_{1}	Ruddock_{3}	Heywood	Hewlett	S.Robinson	Howe	Invincibile	Kuffour_{2}	Duke	Grazioli_{1}	Reeves_{2}	P.Edwards_{3}	McAreavey	McKinney

_{1} 1st Substitution, _{2} 2nd Substitution, _{3} 3rd Substitution.

=== Football League Trophy line-ups ===
Date	Opposition	V	Score	1	2	3	4	5	6	7	8	9	10	11	12	13	14	15	16
16/10/01	Colchester United	A	0–1	Griemink	Gurney	Duke	Reeves_{1}	Heywood	N.Edwards_{3}	McAreavey	Howe	Grazioli_{2}	Kuffour	P.Edwards	Brayley_{1}	Ruddock_{2}	Halliday_{3}	Willis	McKinney

_{1} 1st Substitution, _{2} 2nd Substitution, _{3} 3rd Substitution.
