= Nordic Under-17 Football Championship =

- Founded: 1975
- Region: Nordic countries / Northern Europe
- Teams: 8 (6 Nordic countries plus 2 guests)
- Current champions: Iceland (2nd title)
- Most championships: England (10 titles)
- 2018 Nordic Under-17 Football Championship

The Nordic Under-17 Football Championship (also Nordic Under-17 Tournament or Nordic Cup, Swedish: Nordisk Pojkturnering) is an open Nordic championship tournament for under-17 national football teams.

The competition has been held annually since 1975, exceptions being years 1981 and 1983. It has been an "under-17" event since 2005. The tournament takes place each year in a different Nordic country. It has also been held once in West Germany (1980) and once in England (1999). The competition currently rotates annually between the six main Nordic nations; Denmark, Faroe Islands, Finland, Iceland, Norway and Sweden.

== Age limits ==
- Under-15: 1984–1990
- Under-16: 1975–1982, 1991–2000, 2003–2004
- Under-17: 2001–2002, 2005–

== Winners ==
Country	Winners
England	10 (1989, 1991, 1994, 1995, 1996, 1997, 2001, 2002, 2009, 2010)
Denmark	9 (1975, 1982, 1988, 1990, 1992, 2003, 2004, 2006, 2016)
Norway	7 (1976, 1980, 1984, 1985, 1986, 1993, 2008)
Sweden	6 (1987, 2000, 2007, 2012, 2014, 2015)
West Germany	3 (1977, 1978, 1979)
Finland	3 (1999, 2013, 2022)
Republic of Ireland	2 (1998, 2005)
Iceland	2 (2011, 2018)

== Tournaments ==
Year	Host	Final			Third place match		
Year	Host	Winner	Score	Runner-up	Third place	Score	Fourth place
1975; Details	Finland	Denmark	2 – 1	Finland	West Germany	2–1	Iceland
1976; Details	Iceland	Norway	6 – 5 Penalty shootout (0–0)	Sweden	Denmark	3–2	Finland
1977; Details	Norway	West Germany	6 – 2	Sweden	Norway	3–2	Denmark
1978; Details	Denmark	West Germany	3 – 1 Penalty shootout (3–3)	Sweden	Norway	1–0	Denmark
1979; Details	Sweden	West Germany	3 – 1	Sweden	Norway	5–3	Denmark
1980; Details	West Germany	Norway	1 – 0	West Germany	Denmark	5–2	Finland
1981; Not held							
1982; Details	Finland	Denmark	Round-robin tournament	Sweden	Finland	Round-robin tournament	Iceland
1983; Not held							
1984; Details	Iceland	Norway	Round-robin tournament	Sweden	Denmark	Round-robin tournament	Iceland
1985; Details	Norway	Norway	Round-robin tournament	Sweden	Iceland	Round-robin tournament	Denmark
1986; Details	Denmark	Norway	Round-robin tournament	Sweden	Finland	Round-robin tournament	Denmark
1987; Details	Sweden	Sweden	3 – 1	England	Norway	2–1	Denmark
1988; Details	Sweden	Denmark	Round-robin tournament	England	Norway	Round-robin tournament	Sweden
1989; Details	England	England	Round-robin tournament	Sweden	Finland	Round-robin tournament	Norway
1990; Details	Finland	Denmark	Round-robin tournament	England	Sweden	Round-robin tournament	Norway
1991; Details	Iceland	England	Round-robin tournament	Denmark	Iceland	Round-robin tournament	Finland
1992; Details	Norway	Denmark	4 – 2	England	Finland	7 – 6 Penalty shootout (3–3)	Iceland
1993; Details	Faroe Islands	Norway	2 – 0	Iceland	England	1–0	Finland
1994; Details	Denmark	England	3 – 0	Austria	Sweden	4–0	Iceland
1995; Details	Sweden	England	3 – 2	Scotland	Sweden	3–1	Denmark
1996; Details	Norway	England	3 – 1	Norway	Finland	1–0	Denmark
1997; Details	Finland	England	3 – 2	Norway	Sweden	3 – 2 Penalty shootout (1–1)	Netherlands
1998; Details	Iceland	Republic of Ireland	3 – 2	England	Finland	4 – 3 Penalty shootout (2–2)	Norway
1999; Details	England	Finland	5 – 4 Extra time	England	Denmark	1–0	Sweden
2000; Details	Faroe Islands	Sweden	3 – 0	England	Finland	3–2	Iceland
2001; Details	Denmark	England	4 – 2 Penalty shootout (1–1)	Slovakia	Denmark	4–1	Norway
2002; Details	Sweden	England	1 – 0 Golden goal	Iceland	Slovakia	4 – 3 Penalty shootout (0–0)	Norway
2003; Details	Norway	Denmark	1 – 0	Scotland	Norway	3–1	Finland
2004; Details	Finland	Denmark	3 – 0	Iceland	England	4–0	Norway
2005; Details	Iceland	Republic of Ireland	2 – 0	England	Denmark	7 – 6 Penalty shootout (1–1)	Sweden
2006; Details	Faroe Islands	Denmark	4 – 0	England	Finland	2–1	Sweden
2007; Details	Denmark	Sweden	1 – 0	Belgium	England	1–0	Norway
2008; Details	Sweden	Norway	5 – 2 Extra time (2–2)	Sweden	Denmark	6–1	England
2009; Details	Norway	England	3 – 2 Extra time (2–2)	Scotland	Norway	5–3	Iceland
2010; Details	Finland	England	2 – 1	Sweden	Denmark	5–3	Norway
2011; Details	Iceland	Iceland	1 – 0	Denmark	Norway	2–1	Iceland/2
2012; Details	Faroe Islands	Sweden	2 – 0	England	Norway	2–1	Denmark
2013; Details	Norway	Finland	4 – 3	Denmark	Iceland	5–2	Norway
2014; Details	Denmark	Sweden	2 – 0	Norway	Denmark	3–0	England
2015; Details	Sweden	Sweden	1 – 0	Poland	Iceland	5 – 4 Penalty shootout (0–0)	Denmark
2016; Details	Finland	Denmark	2 – 0	Iceland	Norway	3–0	Montenegro
2017; Details	Iceland	Norway	4– 1	Denmark	Sweden	2–0	Poland
2018; Details	Faroe Islands	Iceland	1 – 0	Finland	Denmark	3–0	Norway
2019; Details	Denmark	Denmark	3 – 2	Sweden	Mexico	5–3	Norway
2022; Details	Norway	Norway	–	Sweden	Denmark		England
2023; Details	Finland	Denmark	1 – 0	Finland	Sweden	4 – 2 Penalty shootout (2–2)	Norway
2024; Details	Sweden	Sweden	Round-robin tournament	Denmark	Norway	Round-robin tournament	Finland
