= 2003–04 Swindon Town F.C. season =

- Chairman: Willie Carson
- Manager: Andy King
- Ground: County Ground, Swindon
- Division Two: 5th
- FA Cup: 1st Round
- League Cup: 2nd Round
- FL Trophy: 1st Round (South)
- Top goalscorer: League: Sam Parkin (20); All: Sam Parkin (23)
- Highest home attendance: 14,540 (vs. Bristol City)
- Lowest home attendance: 5,313 (vs. Southend United)
Home colours	Away colours	Third colours

The 2003–04 season was Swindon Town's fourth season in the Division Two since their relegation from the second tier of English football in 2000. Alongside the league campaign, Swindon Town also competed in the FA Cup, League Cup and the Football League Trophy.

== Nationwide League Division Two ==
Pos	Team	Pld	W	D	L	GF	GA	GD	Pts	Promotion or relegation
3	Bristol City	46	23	13	10	58	37	+21	82	Qualification for the Second Division play-offs
4	Brighton & Hove Albion (O, P)	46	22	11	13	64	43	+21	77	Qualification for the Second Division play-offs
5	Swindon Town	46	20	13	13	76	58	+18	73	Qualification for the Second Division play-offs
6	Hartlepool United	46	20	13	13	76	61	+15	73	Qualification for the Second Division play-offs
7	Port Vale	46	21	10	15	73	63	+10	73	

Rules for classification: In the Football League goals scored (GF) takes precedence over goal difference (GD).
(O) Play-off winners; (P) Promoted

=== Second Division play-offs ===
Semifinals; 1st leg – 15/16 May; 2nd leg – 19/20 May 2004
3rd	Bristol City	1	2	3
6th	Hartlepool United	1	1	2
4th	Brighton & Hove Albion (pens.)	1	1	2 (4)
5th	Swindon Town	0	2	2 (3)

Final at Millennium Stadium, Cardiff; 30 May 2004
3rd	Bristol City	0
4th	Brighton & Hove Albion	1

== Results and matchday squads ==
=== Division Two line-ups ===
Date	Opposition	V	Score	1	2	3	4	5	6	7	8	9	10	11	12	13	14	15	16
09/08/03	Sheffield Wednesday	H	2–3	Griemink	Gurney	Duke	Viveash	Heywood	Hewlett_{1}	Igoe_{2}	Miglioranzi	Parkin	Mooney	Robinson	Howard_{1}	Stevenson_{2}	Smith	Reeves	Evans
15/08/03	Colchester United	A	1–0	Griemink	Gurney	Duke	Viveash	Heywood	Hewlett	Igoe	Miglioranzi	Parkin	Mooney	Robinson	Smith	Stevenson	Howard	Reeves	Evans
23/08/03	Notts County	H	4–0	Griemink	Gurney	Duke_{1}	Viveash	Heywood	Hewlett	Igoe	Miglioranzi	Parkin	Mooney_{2}	Robinson_{3}	Smith_{1}	Stevenson_{2}	Howard_{3}	Reeves	Evans
25/08/03	Bournemouth	A	2–2	Griemink	Gurney	Duke	Viveash	Heywood	Hewlett	Igoe	Miglioranzi	Parkin	Mooney	Robinson	Smith	Stevenson	Howard	Reeves	Evans
30/08/03	Blackpool	H	2–2	Evans	Gurney	Duke	Viveash	Heywood	Hewlett	Igoe	Miglioranzi_{1}	Parkin	Mooney	Robinson_{2}	Smith_{1}	Howard_{2}	Stevenson	Reeves	Griemink
06/09/03	Brighton	A	2–2	Evans	Gurney	Duke_{1}	Viveash	Heywood	Hewlett	Milner	Miglioranzi	Parkin	Mooney	Ifil	Reeves_{1}	Smith	Herring	Howard	Griemink
13/09/03	Wrexham	H	1–0	Evans	Gurney	Duke	Viveash	Heywood	Hewlett	Milner_{1}	Miglioranzi	Parkin	Mooney	Ifil	Reeves_{1}	Stevenson	Nicholas	Howard	Griemink
16/09/03	Grimsby Town	A	2–1	Evans	Gurney	Duke	Viveash	Heywood	Hewlett	Milner	Miglioranzi	Parkin	Mooney	Ifil	Smith	Herring	Stevenson	Reeves	Griemink
20/09/03	Barnsley	A	1–1	Evans	Gurney	Duke_{3}	Viveash_{1}	Heywood	Hewlett	Milner_{2}	Miglioranzi	Parkin	Mooney	Ifil	Reeves_{1}	Igoe_{2}	Howard_{3}	Stevenson	Griemink
27/09/03	Peterborough United	H	2–0	Evans	Gurney	Ifil	Viveash	Heywood	Hewlett	Igoe_{1}	Miglioranzi	Parkin	Mooney	Milner	Howard_{1}	Smith	Stevenson	Reeves	Griemink
01/10/03	Luton Town	H	2–2	Evans	Gurney	Duke_{3}	Viveash	Heywood	Hewlett_{2}	Igoe_{1}	Miglioranzi	Milner	Mooney	Ifil	Howard_{1}	Robinson_{2}	Reeves_{3}	Stevenson	Griemink
04/10/03	Bristol City	A	1–2	Evans	Gurney	Duke	Viveash	Heywood	Hewlett	Igoe_{2}	Miglioranzi_{1}	Herring	Mooney	Howard	Smith_{12}	Reeves_{2}	Stevenson_{3}	Ruster	Griemink
11/10/03	Stockport County	H	1–2	Evans	Reeves	Duke	Viveash	Heywood	Hewlett	Igoe_{2}	Gurney	Stevenson_{1}	Mooney	Robinson	Howard_{1}	Ruster_{2}	Smith	Herring	Griemink
18/10/03	Chesterfield	A	0–3	Evans	Reeves	Duke	Viveash_{1}	Heywood	Hewlett	Robinson	Gurney	Burton	Mooney	Howard_{2}	Ruster_{1}	Nicholas_{2}	Stevenson	Martin	Griemink
21/10/03	Tranmere Rovers	A	0–1	Evans_{1}	Gurney	Duke	Reeves	Heywood	Hewlett_{2}	Lewis	Robinson	Burton	Mooney	Howard_{3}	Garrard_{2}	Smith_{3}	Viveash	Stevenson	Griemink_{1}
25/10/03	Port Vale	H	0–0	Evans	Nicholas	Duke_{2}	Reeves	Heywood	Hewlett	Lewis	Miglioranzi	Burton_{1}	Mooney	Robinson	Stevenson_{1}	Howard_{2}	Viveash	Ruster	Griemink
01/11/03	Wycombe Wanderers	H	2–0	Evans	Nicholas	Duke_{1}	Gurney	Heywood	Hewlett	Lewis_{3}	Miglioranzi	Burton_{2}	Mooney	Robinson	Reeves_{1}	Parkin_{2}	Howard_{3}	Ruster	Griemink
15/11/03	Oldham Athletic	A	1–0	Evans	Ifil	Duke	Gurney	Heywood	Hewlett	Lewis	Miglioranzi	Parkin_{1}	Mooney	Robinson_{2}	Fallon_{1}	Reeves_{2}	Nicholas	Howard	Griemink
22/11/03	QPR	H	1–1	Evans	Ifil	Duke	Gurney	Heywood	Hewlett	Robinson_{1}	Miglioranzi	Parkin	Mooney_{3}	Howard_{2}	Nicholas_{1}	Reeves_{2}	Fallon_{3}	Smith	Griemink
29/11/03	Hartlepool United	A	0–2	Evans	Gurney	Nicholas	Ifil	Reeves	Hewlett	Robinson	Miglioranzi_{1}	Parkin	Mooney	Duke	Fallon_{1}	Smith	Howard	Ruster	Griemink
13/12/03	Plymouth Argyle	H	2–3	Evans	Gurney	Duke_{3}	Ifil	Heywood	Hewlett_{1}	Igoe_{2}	Miglioranzi	Parkin	Mooney	Robinson	Nicholas_{1}	Fallon_{2}	Howard_{3}	Reeves	Griemink
20/12/03	Brentford	A	2–0	Evans	Gurney	Nicholas	Ifil	Heywood_{1}	Robinson	Igoe_{2}	Miglioranzi	Parkin	Mooney	Howard	Reeves_{1}	Duke_{2}	Hewlett	Fallon	Griemink
26/12/03	Rushden & Diamonds	A	0–2	Evans	Gurney	Nicholas	Ifil	Reeves	Robinson	Igoe_{1}	Miglioranzi	Parkin	Fallon	Howard_{2}	Mooney_{1}	Duke_{2}	Hewlett	Ruster	Griemink
28/12/03	Brighton	H	2–1	Evans	Gurney	Nicholas	Ifil	Reeves	Hewlett	Igoe	Miglioranzi	Parkin	Mooney	Howard	Smith	Duke	Stevenson	Fallon	Griemink
03/01/04	Bournemouth	H	2–1	Evans	Gurney	Nicholas	Ifil	Reeves	Hewlett	Igoe_{2}	Miglioranzi	Parkin	Mooney	Howard_{1}	Duke_{1}	Robinson_{2}	Fallon	Martin	Griemink
10/01/04	Sheffield Wednesday	A	1–1	Evans	Gurney	Nicholas	Ifil	Reeves	Hewlett	Igoe	Robinson_{2}	Parkin	Mooney	Howard_{1}	Duke_{1}	Heywood_{2}	Smith	Stevenson	Griemink
17/01/04	Colchester United	H	2–0	Evans	Nicholas	Duke	Ifil	Heywood	Hewlett	Igoe	Robinson	Parkin	Mooney	Howard	Smith	Stevenson	Martin	Reeves	Griemink
24/01/04	Notts County	A	2–1	Evans	Nicholas	Duke	Reeves	Heywood	Hewlett	Igoe	Robinson_{1}	Parkin	Mooney	Howard_{2}	O'Hanlon_{1}	Smith_{2}	Stevenson	Pook	Griemink
31/01/04	Blackpool	A	2–2	Evans	Gurney	Nicholas	Reeves_{2}	Heywood	Hewlett	Igoe	Robinson_{1}	Parkin	Mooney	Duke_{3}	O'Hanlon_{1}	Fallon_{2}	Howard_{3}	Smith	Griemink
07/02/04	Rushden & Diamonds	H	4–2	Evans	O'Hanlon	Nicholas	Reeves	Heywood	Hewlett	Igoe_{2}	Gurney	Parkin	Mooney_{1}	Duke	Fallon_{1}	Miglioranzi_{2}	Viveash	Howard	Griemink
14/02/04	Stockport County	A	4–2	Evans	O'Hanlon	Nicholas	Gurney	Heywood	Hewlett	Howard_{1}	Miglioranzi	Parkin	Mooney	Duke_{2}	Smith_{1}	Igoe_{2}	Stevenson	Reeves	Griemink
21/02/04	Chesterfield	H	2–0	Evans	O'Hanlon	Nicholas	Gurney	Heywood	Hewlett	Igoe	Miglioranzi	Parkin	Mooney	Howard	Smith	Duke	Fallon	Reeves	Griemink
03/03/04	Tranmere Rovers	H	2–0	Evans	O'Hanlon	Nicholas	Gurney	Heywood	Hewlett	Igoe	Miglioranzi	Parkin	Mooney	Howard	Smith	Duke	Fallon	Reeves	Griemink
06/03/04	Brentford	H	2–1	Evans	O'Hanlon	Nicholas_{2}	Gurney	Heywood	Hewlett	Igoe	Miglioranzi_{1}	Parkin	Mooney	Howard	Duke_{1}	Fallon_{2}	Stevenson	Reeves	Griemink
13/03/04	Plymouth Argyle	A	1–2	Evans	O'Hanlon	Nicholas_{2}	Reeves_{1}	Heywood	Hewlett	Igoe	Gurney	Parkin	Mooney	Howard	Duke_{1}	Fallon_{2}	Smith	Martin	Griemink
17/03/04	Grimsby Town	H	2–0	Evans	O'Hanlon	Nicholas	Gurney	Heywood	Hewlett	Igoe	Howard	Parkin	Mooney	Duke	Smith	Stevenson	Fallon	Reeves	Griemink
20/03/04	Wrexham	A	2–3	Evans	O'Hanlon	Nicholas	Gurney	Heywood	Hewlett	Igoe	Howard_{1}	Parkin	Mooney	Duke	Fallon_{1}	Smith	Reeves	Pook	Griemink
27/03/04	Barnsley	H	1–1	Evans	O'Hanlon	Nicholas	Reeves	Heywood	Hewlett	Igoe	Miglioranzi	Parkin	Mooney_{1}	Howard_{2}	Fallon_{1}	Duke_{2}	Smith	Pook	Griemink
30/03/04	Port Vale	A	3–3	Evans	O'Hanlon	Nicholas	Gurney	Heywood	Hewlett	Igoe_{1}	Miglioranzi	Parkin	Mooney	Duke_{2}	Fallon_{1}	Howard_{2}	Reeves	Pook	Griemink
03/04/04	Peterborough United	A	2–4	Griemink	O'Hanlon_{1}	Nicholas	Reeves	Heywood	Gurney	Igoe	Miglioranzi	Parkin	Mooney	Duke	Fallon_{1}	Smith	Pook	Garrard	Evans
10/04/04	Bristol City	H	1–1	Evans	O'Hanlon	Nicholas_{1}	Gurney	Heywood	Hewlett	Igoe	Miglioranzi	Parkin	Mooney	Duke	Fallon_{1}	Smith	Reeves	Garrard	Griemink
12/04/04	Luton Town	A	3–0	Evans	O'Hanlon	Nicholas	Gurney	Heywood	Hewlett	Igoe	Miglioranzi	Parkin_{1}	Fallon	Duke	Mooney_{1}	Smith	Reeves	Howe	Griemink
17/04/04	Wycombe Wanderers	A	3–0	Evans	O'Hanlon_{3}	Nicholas	Gurney	Heywood	Hewlett	Igoe	Miglioranzi	Parkin_{1}	Fallon	Duke_{2}	Mooney_{1}	Howard_{2}	Viveash_{3}	Reeves	Griemink
24/04/04	Oldham Athletic	H	1–2	Evans	O'Hanlon	Nicholas_{1}	Gurney	Heywood	Hewlett_{3}	Howard_{2}	Miglioranzi	Fallon	Mooney	Duke	Parkin_{1}	Igoe_{2}	Reeves_{3}	Garrard	Griemink
01/05/04	QPR	A	0–1	Evans	O'Hanlon	Nicholas_{3}	Gurney	Reeves	Hewlett	Igoe_{2}	Miglioranzi_{1}	Parkin	Fallon	Duke	Howard_{1}	Mooney_{2}	Smith_{3}	Viveash	Griemink
08/05/04	Hartlepool United	H	1–1	Evans	O'Hanlon	Nicholas	Gurney	Reeves	Hewlett	Igoe	Howard	Parkin	Fallon	Duke	Smith	Viveash	Mooney	Pook	Griemink

_{1} 1st Substitution, _{2} 2nd Substitution, _{3} 3rd Substitution.

=== Division Two Play-Offs line-ups ===
Date	Opposition	V	Score	1	2	3	4	5	6	7	8	9	10	11	12	13	14	15	16
16/05/04	Brighton	A	0–1	Evans	Gurney	Nicholas_{2}	O'Hanlon	Heywood	Hewlett	Igoe	Howard	Parkin	Mooney	Duke_{1}	Smith_{1}	Fallon_{2}	Viveash	Reeves	Griemink
20/05/04	Brighton	H	2–1	Evans	Gurney	Smith_{2}	O'Hanlon	Heywood	Hewlett	Igoe_{3}	Miglioranzi	Parkin	Mooney	Howard_{1}	Fallon_{1}	Nicholas_{2}	Reeves_{3}	Pook	Griemink

_{1} 1st Substitution, _{2} 2nd Substitution, _{3} 3rd Substitution.

=== FA Cup line-ups ===
Date	Opposition	V	Score	1	2	3	4	5	6	7	8	9	10	11	12	13	14	15	16
08/11/03	Wycombe Wanderers	A	1–4	Evans	Nicholas	Duke	Reeves_{2}	Heywood	Gurney	Robinson	Miglioranzi	Parkin	Mooney	Howard_{1}	Smith_{1}	Ruster_{2}	Viveash	Herring	Griemink

_{1} 1st Substitution, _{2} 2nd Substitution, _{3} 3rd Substitution.

=== League Cup line-ups ===
Date	Opposition	V	Score	1	2	3	4	5	6	7	8	9	10	11	12	13	14	15	16
12/08/03	Southend United	A	2–3	Evans	Viveash	Smith_{3}	Reeves	Heywood	Hewlett	Igoe	Robinson	Parkin	Stevenson_{1}	Howard_{2}	Mooney_{1}	Miglioranzi_{2}	Duke_{3}	Nicholas	Griemink
24/09/03	Leeds United	A	2–2	Griemink	Gurney	Duke	Reeves	Heywood	Hewlett	Igoe_{2}	Miglioranzi	Parkin	Stevenson_{1}	Smith_{3}	Howard_{1}	Herring_{3}	Viveash	Nicholas	Evans_{3}

_{1} 1st Substitution, _{2} 2nd Substitution, _{3} 3rd Substitution.

=== Football League Trophy line-ups ===
Date	Opposition	V	Score	1	2	3	4	5	6	7	8	9	10	11	12	13	14	15	16
15/10/02	Boston United	A	1–2	Griemink	Herring	Nicholas	Reeves	Viveash	Pook_{1}	Ruster_{3}	Robinson	Stevenson	Smith_{2}	Howard	Garrard_{1}	Martin_{2}	Duke_{3}	Heywood	Evans

_{1} 1st Substitution, _{2} 2nd Substitution, _{3} 3rd Substitution.
