= 1993–94 Swindon Town F.C. season =

Swindon Town
1993–94 season
- Chairman: Ray Hardman
- Manager: John Gorman
- Stadium: County Ground
- Premier League: 22nd (relegated)
- FA Cup: Third round
- League Cup: Third round
- Top goalscorer: League: Jan Åge Fjørtoft (12); All: Jan Åge Fjørtoft (13)
- Highest home attendance: 18,102 vs. Manchester United (19 Mar 1994, Premier League)
- Lowest home attendance: 11,940 vs. Oldham Athletic (18 Aug 1993, Premier League)
- Average home league attendance: 15,274
Home colours	Away colours

During the 1993–94 English football season, Swindon Town F.C. competed in the FA Premier League. It was Town's first (and, to date, only) season in the top flight of English football.

== Season summary ==
Three years after winning promotion, and then being denied top-flight football for financial irregularities, the Robins finally reached the elite after 73 years of trying thanks to a pulsating 4–3 win over Leicester City in the Division One playoff final.

Soon after securing promotion, player-manager Glenn Hoddle left to take charge of Chelsea. His assistant John Gorman was expected to follow Hoddle to Stamford Bridge, but instead accepted Swindon's offer to become manager. He signed Norwegian striker Jan Aage Fjortoft from Rapid Vienna as well as another striker, Andy Mutch, from Wolves.

Swindon did not record a league win until their 17th game, winning just five games and becoming the first top division team in 30 years to concede 100 league goals, with only four clean sheets all season. They would have fared worse still had it not been for the strong form during the second half of the season of Jan Åge Fjørtoft, who was on target 12 times in the league, with all of his goals coming after the turn of the new year.

Swindon's first ever top-flight victory came on 24 November 1993 when a Keith Scott goal gave them a 1–0 home win over Queens Park Rangers. Their 20th game of the season was a memorable one. They travelled to Anfield to face Liverpool, and managed to hold the home side to a 2–2 draw just over three months after they had crushed Swindon 5–0 at the County Ground. Midfielder John Moncur had put Swindon 1–0 up on the hour, and although Liverpool equalised after 71 minutes, Swindon restored their lead three minutes later with a goal from Keith Scott. They were still ahead with five minutes remaining, before an 86th-minute equaliser from Liverpool's Mark Wright denied Swindon a famous victory. Swindon won their next game 2–1 at home to Southampton. They held Sheffield Wednesday to a thrilling 3–3 draw at Hillsborough on 29 December with two goals from striker Craig Maskell. However, after the turn of the new year, Swindon found themselves on the receiving end of some more heavy defeats. On 15 January, they lost 6–2 to Everton at Goodison Park, though they did manage a narrow victory over Tottenham Hotspur in their next game, and within a month had fallen to a 5–0 defeat at Aston Villa. They were then crushed 7–1 at Newcastle on 12 March. A 2–2 home draw with Manchester United on 19 March sparked fresh hope that Swindon might just about climb to safety, but they collected just two points from their final eight games and were firmly rooted in bottom place. They had won just five league games all season and conceded 100 goals. Although a string of teams have since recorded fewer wins and points in the Premier League, only Sheffield United have matched Swindon's record for conceding the most goals.

John Gorman spoke of his hope that Swindon would soon return to the Premiership, John Gorman was sacked as Swindon Town manager early in the 1994/95 season to be succeeded by Steve McMahon, Swindon Town would be relegated to Division 2 at the end of the 1994/95 season

== Transfers ==
=== Transferred in ===
Date	Pos	Player	From	Fee
20 July 1993	DM	(Netherlands) Luc Nijholt	(Scotland) Motherwell	£175,000
29 July 1993	CF	(Norway) Jan Åge Fjørtoft	(Austria) Rapid Vienna	£500,000
30 July 1993	CB	Adrian Whitbread	Leyton Orient	£500,000
20 August 1993	CF	Andy Mutch	Wolverhampton Wanderers	£250,000
6 September 1993	CB	Terry Fenwick	Tottenham Hotspur	Free transfer
17 September 1993	LM	Ty Gooden	Wycombe Wanderers	Free transfer
18 November 1993	CF	Keith Scott	Wycombe Wanderers	£300,000
20 January 1994	CB	Brian Kilcline	Newcastle United	£90,000
17 March 1994	CM	(Northern Ireland) Lawrie Sanchez	Wimbledon	Free transfer
				£1,815,000

=== Loaned in ===
Date	Pos	Player	To	Loan End
4 January 1994	GK	(Scotland) Stewart Kerr	(Scotland) Celtic	10 February 1994
28 January 1994	GK	Jon Sheffield	Cambridge United	20 February 1994
16 February 1994	CF	(Scotland) Frank McAvennie	(Scotland) Celtic	16 May 1994
24 March 1994	GK	Paul Heald	Leyton Orient	24 May 1994

=== Transferred out ===
Date	Pos	Player	To	Fee
1 June 1993	CF	Paul Hunt	Gloucester City	Free transfer
1 June 1993	RM	Brian Marwood	Barnet	Free transfer
15 July 1993	CM	Glenn Hoddle	Chelsea	Free transfer
19 July 1993	CB	(Scotland) Colin Calderwood	Tottenham Hotspur	£1,250,000
27 July 1993	CF	(Scotland) Dave Mitchell	(Turkey) Altay	£20,000
3 November 1993	CM	Micky Hazard	Tottenham Hotspur	£50,000
7 February 1994	CF	Craig Maskell	Southampton	£250,000
				£1,570,000

=== Loaned out ===
Date	Pos	Player	To	Loan End

=== Overall transfer activity ===
==== Expenditure ====
▼£1,815,000

==== Income ====
▲£1,570,000

==== Balance ====
▼£245,000

== Squad ==
#	Pos	Name	Nat	Place of birth	Date of birth (age)	Signed from	Date signed	Fee	Apps	Gls
Goalkeepers
1	GK	Fraser Digby	(England)	Sheffield	23 April 1967 (aged 26)	Manchester United	23 December 1986	£32,000	319	0
23	GK	Nick Hammond	(England)	Hornchurch	7 September 1967 (aged 25)	Arsenal	1 June 1987	Free transfer	65	0
29	GK	Shane Cook	(England)	Bristol	2 November 1975 (aged 17)	Academy	1 January 1994	—N/a	-	-
30	GK	Stewart Kerr	(Scotland)	Bellshill	13 November 1974 (aged 18)	(Scotland) Celtic	4 January 1994	Loan	-	-
34	GK	Paul Heald	(England)	Wath-on-Dearne	20 September 1968 (aged 24)	Leyton Orient	24 March 1994	Loan	-	-
40	GK	Jon Sheffield	(England)	Coventry	1 February 1969 (aged 24)	Cambridge United	28 January 1994	Loan	-	-
Defenders
2	RB	Nicky Summerbee	(England)	Altrincham	26 August 1971 (aged 21)	Academy	1 July 1989	—N/a	91	5
3	LB	Paul Bodin	(Wales)	Cardiff	13 September 1964 (aged 28)	Crystal Palace	10 January 1992	£225,000	184	24
6	CB	Shaun Taylor (c)	(England)	Plymouth	26 February 1963 (aged 30)	Exeter City	26 July 1991	£200,000	107	18
14	CB	Adrian Whitbread	(England)	Epping	22 October 1971 (aged 21)	Leyton Orient	30 July 1993	£500,000	-	-
15	CB	Adi Viveash	(England)	Swindon	30 September 1969 (aged 23)	Academy	1 July 1988	—N/a	49	1
18	RB	Eddie Murray	(England)	Bristol	31 August 1973 (aged 19)	Academy	1 July 1992	—N/a	2	0
19	CB	Andy Thomson	(England)	Swindon	28 March 1974 (aged 19)	Academy	1 July 1993	—N/a	-	-
24	LB	Lee Middleton	(England)	Nuneaton	11 September 1970 (aged 22)	Coventry City	20 July 1992	Free transfer	0	0
26	CB	Terry Fenwick	(England)	Seaham	17 November 1959 (aged 33)	Tottenham Hotspur	6 September 1993	Free transfer	-	-
31	CB	Brian Kilcline	(England)	Nottingham	7 May 1962 (aged 31)	Newcastle United	20 January 1994	£90,000	-	-
Midfielders
4	CM	Micky Hazard	(England)	Sunderland	5 February 1960 (aged 33)	Portsmouth	28 September 1990	£130,000	132	18
5	DM	Luc Nijholt	(Netherlands)	Zaandam	29 July 1961 (aged 31)	(Scotland) Motherwell	20 July 1993	£175,000	-	-
7	RM	John Moncur	(England)	Stepney	22 September 1966 (aged 26)	Tottenham Hotspur	30 March 1992	£80,000	22	2
8	DM	Ross MacLaren	(Scotland)	Edinburgh	14 April 1962 (aged 31)	Derby County	4 August 1988	£150,000	227	12
10	LM	Martin Ling	(England)	West Ham	15 July 1966 (aged 26)	Southend United	15 July 1991	£15,000	82	7
16	CM	Kevin Horlock	(Northern Ireland)	(England) Erith	1 November 1972 (aged 20)	West Ham United	14 August 1992	Free transfer	17	1
20	CM	Wayne O'Sullivan	(Republic of Ireland)	(Cyprus) Akrotiri	12 May 1971 (aged 22)	Academy	1 July 1991	—N/a	1	0
21	CM	Marcus Phillips	(England)	Trowbridge	17 October 1973 (aged 19)	Academy	1 July 1992	—N/a	1	0
22	AM	Austin Berkley	(England)	Dartford	28 January 1973 (aged 20)	Gillingham	16 May 1992	Free transfer	1	1
28	LM	Ty Gooden	(England)	Canvey Island	23 October 1972 (aged 20)	Wycombe Wanderers	17 September 1993	Free transfer	-	-
33	CM	Lawrie Sanchez	(Northern Ireland)	(England) Lambeth	22 October 1959 (aged 33)	Wimbledon	17 March 1994	Free transfer	-	-
Forwards
9	CF	Jan Åge Fjørtoft	(Norway)	Gursken	10 January 1967 (aged 26)	Rapid Vienna	29 July 1993	£500,000	-	-
11	CF	Craig Maskell	(England)	Aldershot	10 April 1968 (aged 25)	Reading	3 July 1992	£100,000	41	23
12	CF	Steve White	(England)	Chipping Sodbury	2 January 1959 (aged 34)	Bristol Rovers	8 July 1986	Free transfer	303	111
17	CF	Chris Hamon	(United Kingdom)	Jersey	27 April 1970 (aged 23)	(Jersey) St. Peter	1 July 1992	Free transfer	2	0
25	CF	Andy Mutch	(England)	Liverpool	3 November 1971 (aged 21)	Wolverhampton Wanderers	20 August 1993	£250,000	-	-
27	CF	Keith Scott	(England)	Westminster	9 June 1967 (aged 26)	Wycombe Wanderers	18 November 1993	£300,000	-	-
32	CF	Frank McAvennie	(Scotland)	Glasgow	22 November 1959 (aged 33)	Celtic	16 February 1994	Loan	-	-

Note: Stats and ages are correct as of July 1, 1993.

== Final league table ==
Pos	Team	Pld	W	D	L	GF	GA	GD	Pts	Qualification or relegation
18	Southampton	42	12	7	23	49	66	−17	43	
19	Ipswich Town	42	9	16	17	35	58	−23	43	
20	Sheffield United (R)	42	8	18	16	42	60	−18	42	Relegation to Football League First Division
21	Oldham Athletic (R)	42	9	13	20	42	68	−26	40	Relegation to Football League First Division
22	Swindon Town (R)	42	5	15	22	47	100	−53	30	Relegation to Football League First Division

Source: Premier League
Rules for classification: 1) points; 2) goal difference; 3) number of goals scored.
(R) Relegated

== Results ==
Swindon Town's score comes first

=== Legend ===
Win	Draw	Loss

=== FA Premier League ===
Date	Opponent	Venue	Result	Attendance	Scorers
14 August 1993	Sheffield United	A	1–3	20,904	Moncur
18 August 1993	Oldham Athletic	H	0–1	11,940	
22 August 1993	Liverpool	H	0–5	17,364	
25 August 1993	Southampton	A	1–5	12,505	Maskell (pen)
28 August 1993	Norwich City	A	0–0	17,614	
1 September 1993	Manchester City	H	1–3	16,067	Summerbee
11 September 1993	West Ham United	A	0–0	15,777	
18 September 1993	Newcastle United	H	2–2	15,393	Ling, Mutch
25 September 1993	Manchester United	A	2–4	44,583	Mutch, Bodin (pen)
2 October 1993	Blackburn Rovers	H	1–3	15,847	Taylor
16 October 1993	Everton	H	1–1	14,437	Taylor
23 October 1993	Tottenham Hotspur	A	1–1	31,394	Bodin (pen)
30 October 1993	Aston Villa	H	1–2	16,322	Bodin (pen)
6 November 1993	Wimbledon	A	0–3	7,758	
20 November 1993	Ipswich Town	H	2–2	13,860	Scott, Bodin (pen)
24 November 1993	Queens Park Rangers	H	1–0	14,674	Scott
27 November 1993	Leeds United	A	0–3	32,630	
4 December 1993	Sheffield United	H	0–0	12,882	
7 December 1993	Oldham Athletic	A	1–2	19,498	Mutch
11 December 1993	Liverpool	A	2–2	32,739	Moncur, Scott
18 December 1993	Southampton	H	2–1	13,565	Bodin, Scott
27 December 1993	Arsenal	H	0–4	17,214	
29 December 1993	Sheffield Wednesday	A	3–3	30,570	Mutch, Maskell (2)
1 January 1994	Chelsea	H	1–3	16,261	Mutch
3 January 1994	Coventry City	A	1–1	15,869	Mutch
15 January 1994	Everton	A	2–6	20,760	Moncur, Bodin
22 January 1994	Tottenham Hotspur	H	2–1	16,464	Fjørtoft, Whitbread
5 February 1994	Coventry City	H	3–1	14,635	Fjørtoft (3, 2 pens)
12 February 1994	Aston Villa	A	0–5	27,637	
19 February 1994	Norwich City	H	3–3	15,405	Taylor, Fjørtoft (2)
25 February 1994	Manchester City	A	1–2	26,360	Fjørtoft
5 March 1994	West Ham United	H	1–1	15,929	Fjørtoft
12 March 1994	Newcastle United	A	1–7	32,219	Moncur
19 March 1994	Manchester United	H	2–2	18,102	Nijholt, Fjørtoft
26 March 1994	Blackburn Rovers	A	1–3	20,046	Fjørtoft
2 April 1994	Arsenal	A	1–1	31,635	Bodin (pen)
4 April 1994	Sheffield Wednesday	H	0–1	13,927	
16 April 1994	Ipswich Town	A	1–1	14,760	Fjørtoft
23 April 1994	Wimbledon	H	2–4	13,309	Summerbee, Barton (own goal)
27 April 1994	Chelsea	A	0–2	11,180	
30 April 1994	Queens Park Rangers	A	3–1	9,875	Taylor, Fjørtoft, Summerbee
7 May 1994	Leeds United	H	0–5	17,228	

=== FA Cup ===
Round	Date	Opponent	Venue	Result	Attendance	Goalscorers
R3	8 January 1994	Ipswich Town	H	1–1	12,105	Mutch
R3R	18 January 1994	Ipswich Town	A	1–2 (a.e.t.)	12,796	Fjørtoft

=== League Cup ===
Round	Date	Opponent	Venue	Result	Attendance	Goalscorers
R2 1st leg	22 September 1993	Wolverhampton Wanderers	H	2–0	8,649	Summerbee, Mutch
R2 2nd leg	5 October 1993	Wolverhampton Wanderers	A	1–2 (won 3–2 on agg)	11,756	Summerbee
R3	26 October 1993	Portsmouth	A	0–2	12,554	

== Squad ==
Note: Flags indicate national team as defined under FIFA eligibility rules; some limited exceptions apply. Players may hold more than one non-FIFA nationality.

No.	Pos.	Nation	Player
1	GK	ENG	Fraser Digby
2	MF	ENG	Nicky Summerbee
3	DF	WAL	Paul Bodin
4	MF	ENG	Micky Hazard
5	MF	NED	Luc Nijholt
6	DF	ENG	Shaun Taylor
7	MF	ENG	John Moncur
8	MF	SCO	Ross MacLaren
9	FW	NOR	Jan Åge Fjørtoft
10	MF	ENG	Martin Ling
11	FW	ENG	Craig Maskell
12	FW	ENG	Steve White
14	DF	ENG	Adrian Whitbread
15	DF	ENG	Adi Viveash
16	MF	NIR	Kevin Horlock
17	FW	ENG	Chris Hamon
18	MF	ENG	Eddie Murray

No.	Pos.	Nation	Player
19	DF	ENG	Andy Thomson
20	DF	IRL	Wayne O'Sullivan
21	MF	ENG	Marcus Phillips
22	MF	ENG	Austin Berkley
23	GK	ENG	Nick Hammond
24	DF	ENG	Lee Middleton
25	FW	ENG	Andy Mutch
26	DF	ENG	Terry Fenwick
27	FW	ENG	Keith Scott
28	MF	ENG	Ty Gooden
29	GK	ENG	Shane Cook
30	GK	SCO	Stewart Kerr (on loan from Celtic)
31	DF	ENG	Brian Kilcline
32	FW	SCO	Frank McAvennie (on loan from Celtic)
33	MF	NIR	Lawrie Sanchez
34	GK	ENG	Paul Heald (on loan from Leyton Orient)
40	GK	ENG	Jon Sheffield (on loan from Cambridge United)

== Starting 11 ==
Only considering Premier League starts

- GK: #1, (England) Fraser Digby, 28
- RB: #2, (England) Nicky Summerbee, 36
- CB: #6, (England) Shaun Taylor, 42
- CB: #14, (England) Adrian Whitbread, 34
- LB: #3, (Wales) Paul Bodin, 28
- RM: #7, (England) John Moncur, 41
- CM: #5, (Netherlands) Luc Nijholt, 31
- CM: #16, (Northern Ireland) Kevin Horlock, 32
- LM: #10, (England) Martin Ling, 29
- CF: #9, (Norway) Jan Åge Fjørtoft, 36
- CF: #25, (England) Andy Mutch, 27
