= 1992–93 Swindon Town F.C. season =

Swindon Town
1992–93 season
- Chairman: Ray Hardman
- Manager: Glenn Hoddle
- Stadium: County Ground, Swindon
- First Division: 5th (promoted)
- FA Cup: Third round
- League Cup: Third round
- Top goalscorer: League: Maskell (18); All: Maskell (23)
- Highest home attendance: 17,574 vs. Newcastle United
- Lowest home attendance: 3,293 vs. Torquay United
Home colours

The 1992–93 season was Swindon Town's 6th consecutive season in the second tier of English football after winning promotion in 1986–87.

== Season summary ==
Swindon won promotion to the Premier League and the top flight for the first time in the club's history after beating Leicester City in the play-off final at Wembley. Hoddle moved to Chelsea during the summer of 1993 and was replaced by assistant John Gorman.

== Final league table ==
Pos	Team	Pld	W	D	L	GF	GA	GD	Pts	Qualification or relegation
3	Portsmouth	46	26	10	10	80	46	+34	88	Qualification for the First Division play-offs
4	Tranmere Rovers	46	23	10	13	72	56	+16	79	Qualification for the First Division play-offs
5	Swindon Town (O, P)	46	21	13	12	74	59	+15	76	Qualification for the First Division play-offs
6	Leicester City	46	22	10	14	71	64	+7	76	Qualification for the First Division play-offs
7	Millwall	46	18	16	12	65	53	+12	70	

Source: rsssf.com
Rules for classification: 1) Points; 2) Goals scored; 3) Goal difference
(O) Play-off winners; (P) Promoted

== Results ==
Swindon Town's score comes first

=== Legend ===
Win	Draw	Loss

=== Football League First Division ===
Date	Opponent	Venue	Result	Attendance	Scorers
15 August 1992	Sunderland	H	1–0	11,094	Hoddle
19 August 1992	Bristol Rovers	A	4–3	6,150	Taylor, Mitchell (2), Bodin (pen)
22 August 1992	Wolverhampton Wanderers	A	2–2	15,493	Maskell, Taylor
29 August 1992	Cambridge United	H	4–1	8,134	Taylor, Maskell (3, 1 pen)
5 September 1992	Millwall	A	1–2	8,091	Maskell
12 September 1992	Bristol Rovers	H	2–2	10,006	Mitchell, Maskell
20 September 1992	Oxford United	H	2–2	7,717	Ling, Taylor
26 September 1992	Charlton Athletic	A	0–2	6,742	
29 September 1992	Grimsby Town	H	1–0	5,759	Maskell
3 October 1992	Watford	H	3–1	7,723	Maskell (2), Taylor
10 October 1992	Portsmouth	A	1–3	12,442	White
17 October 1992	Notts County	H	5–1	7,589	Ling, Mitchell, Summerbee, Moncur, Horlock
24 October 1992	West Ham United	A	1–0	17,842	Maskell
31 October 1992	Barnsley	H	1–0	7,784	Maskell (pen)
3 November 1992	Brentford	H	0–2	7,832	
8 November 1992	Newcastle United	A	0–0	28,091	
14 November 1992	Southend United	H	3–2	7,777	Maskell (2), Ling
21 November 1992	Bristol City	A	2–2	14,066	Maskell, Summerbee
29 November 1992	Peterborough United	A	3–3	5,976	Taylor (2), Maskell
6 December 1992	Derby County	H	2–4	8,924	Hazard, Maskell
20 December 1992	Leicester City	A	2–4	15,088	Hazard, Walsh (own goal)
9 January 1993	Oxford United	A	1–0	9,146	White
12 January 1993	Birmingham City	H	0–0	14,398	
16 January 1993	Charlton Athletic	H	2–2	8,605	Summerbee, Calderwood
26 January 1993	Grimsby Town	A	1–2	5,207	Bodin
30 January 1993	Wolverhampton Wanderers	H	1–0	12,854	Bodin
6 February 1993	Sunderland	A	1–0	17,234	Bodin
13 February 1993	Millwall	H	3–0	10,544	White, Bodin, Taylor
20 February 1993	Cambridge United	A	0–1	5,437	
23 February 1993	Tranmere Rovers	H	2–0	10,059	Mitchell (2)
27 February 1993	Portsmouth	H	1–0	14,077	Bodin
6 March 1993	Watford	A	4–0	8,791	White (3), Mitchell
10 March 1993	Southend United	A	1–1	4,317	White
13 March 1993	Newcastle United	H	2–1	17,574	Bodin (pen), Calderwood
17 March 1993	Luton Town	A	0–0	8,902	
21 March 1993	Derby County	A	1–2	12,166	Taylor
24 March 1993	Bristol City	H	2–1	13,157	Marwood, Bodin (pen)
27 March 1993	Brentford	A	0–0	10,197	
3 April 1993	Peterborough United	H	1–0	10,314	Bodin
6 April 1993	Tranmere Rovers	A	1–3	8,335	Mitchell
10 April 1993	Luton Town	H	1–0	10,934	Bodin
12 April 1993	Birmingham City	A	6–4	17,903	Taylor, Maskell (2), Mitchell (3)
17 April 1993	Leicester City	H	1–1	15,428	Taylor
24 April 1993	Notts County	A	1–1	8,382	Bodin (pen)
2 May 1993	West Ham United	H	1–3	17,004	Hazard
8 May 1993	Barnsley	A	0–1	6,031	

=== FA Cup ===
Round	Date	Opponent	Venue	Result	Attendance	Goalscorers
R3	4 January 1993	Queens Park Rangers	A	0–3	12,106	

=== League Cup ===
Round	Date	Opponent	Venue	Result	Attendance	Goalscorers
R2 First Leg	22 September 1992	Torquay United	A	6–0	3,560	Maskell, Mitchell (2), Ling, Taylor, White
R2 Second Leg	6 October 1992	Torquay United	H	3–2 (won 9–2 on agg)	3,293	Hoddle, White, Mitchell
R3	27 October 1992	Oldham Athletic	H	0–1	8,811	

=== Anglo-Italian Cup ===
Round	Date	Opponent	Venue	Result	Attendance	Goalscorers
PR Group 7	1 September 1992	Oxford United	A	3–1	4,069	Maskell, Summerbee, Berkley
PR Group 7	16 September 1992	Brentford	H	1–2	3,819	Mitchell

== Play-offs ==
First Leg	Swindon Town	3–1	Tranmere Rovers
Second Leg	Tranmere Rovers	3–2	Swindon Town

After a fairly quiet first half, Swindon Town led 1–0 thanks to a goal from player/manager Glenn Hoddle 3 minutes before the break. The match then took off with an exciting second half, just 2 minutes after the restart Craig Maskell put Swindon 2–0 to the good after he finished off a pass from John Moncur, then a header by Shaun Taylor gave Swindon a three-goal advantage six minutes later. At 3–0 Swindon should have been comfortable, but 4 minutes later Julian Joachim pulled one back for Leicester to give them hope. It got better for Leicester as 11 minutes later Steve Walsh raced through to make it 3–2, and just a minute after that Steve Thompson equalised wrapping up an astonishing come-back by Leicester, scoring 3 goals in 12 minutes. However, it turned out to be in vain, when Swindon were awarded a contentious penalty 6 minutes from time after Kevin Poole was alleged to have brought down Steve White in the area. Paul Bodin converted the penalty to finish the game at 4–3 and sent Swindon to the Premier League, while Leicester were left to rue a second year of misery, having lost in the play-off final thanks to controversial penalty for the second year running.

Eurosport placed the game at #94 on its list of the 100 Greatest football matches of all-time.

== Match details ==
31 May 1993
15:00 BST

Leicester City	3 – 4	Swindon Town
Joachim 57'; Walsh 68'; Thompson 69'	Report	Hoddle 42'; Maskell 47'; Taylor 53'; Bodin 84' (pen.)

Wembley Stadium, London
Attendance: 73,802
Referee: David Elleray (Harrow)

LEICESTER CITY:
GK	1	(England) Kevin Poole
RB	2	(England) Gary Mills (c)
LB	3	(England) Mike Whitlow
CB	4	(England) Richard Smith
FW	5	(England) Steve Walsh	Booked
CB	6	(Northern Ireland) Colin Hill
RM	7	(Australia) David Oldfield
CM	8	(England) Steve Thompson
FW	9	(England) Julian Joachim
CM	10	(England) Steve Agnew
LM	11	(England) Lee Philpott
Substitutes:
FW	12	(England) Ian Ormondroyd
MF	14	(England) Colin Gibson
Manager:
(England) Brian Little

SWINDON TOWN:
GK	1	(England) Fraser Digby
RB	2	(England) Nicky Summerbee
LB	3	(Wales) Paul Bodin
CM	4	(England) Glenn Hoddle	Booked
CB	5	(Scotland) Colin Calderwood (c)
CB	6	(England) Shaun Taylor
CM	7	(England) John Moncur		(substituted off) 88'
LM	8	(Scotland) Ross MacLaren
FW	9	(Australia) David Mitchell
RM	10	(England) Martin Ling
FW	11	(England) Craig Maskell		(substituted off) 78'
Substitutes:
FW	12	(England) Steve White		(substituted in) 78'
MF	14	(England) Micky Hazard		(substituted in) 88'
Player/Manager:
(England) Glenn Hoddle

MATCH RULES

- 90 minutes.
- 30 minutes of extra-time if necessary.
- Penalty shootout if scores still level.
- Two named substitutes.
- Maximum of two substitutions.

== Matchday squads ==
=== Division One line-ups ===
Date	Opposition	V	Score	1	2	3	4	5	6	7	8	9	10	11	12	14
15/08/92	Sunderland	H	1–0	Digby	Summerbee	Bodin	Hoddle	Calderwood	Taylor	Hazard	Moncur	Maskell_{1}	Ling	Mitchell	Close_{1}	Viveash
19/08/92	Bristol Rovers	A	4–3	Digby	Summerbee	Bodin	Hoddle	Calderwood	Taylor	Hazard	Moncur	Maskell_{2}	Ling	Mitchell_{1}	White_{1}	Kerslake_{2}
22/08/92	Wolverhampton Wanderers	A	2–2	Digby	Summerbee	Bodin	Hoddle	Calderwood	Taylor	Hazard	Moncur	Maskell	Kerslake	Mitchell	White	Ling
29/08/92	Cambridge United	H	4–1	Digby	Kerslake	Bodin	Hoddle	Calderwood	Taylor	Hazard	Moncur	Maskell	Ling	Mitchell	Summerbee	Close
05/09/92	Millwall	A	1–2	Digby	Kerslake	Bodin	Hoddle	Calderwood	Taylor	Hazard	Moncur	Maskell	Ling	Mitchell	White_{1}	Summerbee
12/09/92	Bristol Rovers	H	2–2	Digby	Kerslake	Bodin	Hoddle	Calderwood	Taylor	Summerbee	Moncur	Maskell	Ling	Mitchell	White	Viveash
20/09/92	Oxford United	H	2–2	Digby	Kerslake	Bodin	Hoddle	Calderwood	Taylor	Hazard	Moncur	Maskell	Ling	Mitchell	White	Close
26/09/92	Charlton Athletic	A	0–2	Digby	Kerslake	Bodin	Hoddle	Calderwood	Taylor	Hazard_{1}	Moncur	Maskell_{2}	Ling	Mitchell	Summerbee_{1}	White_{2}
29/09/92	Grimsby Town	H	1–0	Hammond	Kerslake	Bodin	Hoddle	Calderwood	Taylor	Hazard	Moncur	Maskell	Ling	Mitchell	Summerbee	White
03/10/92	Watford	H	3–1	Hammond	Kerslake	Bodin	Hoddle	Calderwood	Taylor	Hazard	Summerbee	Maskell	Ling	Mitchell_{1}	White_{1}	Phillips
10/10/92	Portsmouth	A	1–3	Hammond	Kerslake	Bodin_{1}	Hoddle	Calderwood	Taylor	Hazard_{2}	Summerbee	Maskell	Ling	Mitchell	White_{2}	Horlock_{1}
17/10/92	Notts County	H	5–1	Hammond	Kerslake	Horlock	Hoddle	Calderwood	Taylor	Hazard	Summerbee_{2}	Maskell_{1}	Ling	Mitchell	White_{1}	Moncur_{2}
24/10/92	West Ham United	A	1–0	Hammond	Kerslake	Horlock	Hoddle	Calderwood	Taylor	Hazard	Moncur_{1}	Maskell	Ling	Mitchell	White_{1}	Viveash
31/10/92	Barnsley	H	1–0	Hammond	Kerslake	Horlock	Hoddle	Calderwood	Taylor	Hazard	Summerbee	Maskell	Ling	Mitchell_{1}	White_{1}	Viveash
03/11/92	Brentford	H	0–2	Hammond	Kerslake_{1}	Horlock	Hoddle	Calderwood	Taylor	Hazard	Summerbee	Maskell	Ling	Mitchell	White_{1}	Viveash
08/11/92	Newcastle United	A	0–0	Hammond	Kerslake	Horlock	Hoddle	Calderwood	Taylor	Hazard	Summerbee	Maskell_{1}	Ling	Mitchell	White_{1}	Berkley
14/11/92	Southend United	H	3–2	Hammond	Kerslake	Horlock	Hoddle	Calderwood	Taylor	Hazard_{1}	Summerbee	Maskell	Ling	Mitchell	White	Hunt_{1}
21/11/92	Bristol City	A	2–2	Hammond	Kerslake	Horlock	Hoddle_{1}	Calderwood	Taylor	Hazard	Summerbee	Maskell	Ling	Mitchell	White_{1}	Hunt
29/11/92	Peterborough United	A	3–3	Hammond	Kerslake	Horlock	Hoddle	Calderwood	Taylor	Hazard	Summerbee	Maskell	Ling	Mitchell	White	Moncur
06/12/92	Derby County	H	2–4	Hammond	Kerslake	Horlock	Hoddle	Calderwood	Taylor	Hazard	Summerbee_{1}	Maskell	Ling	Mitchell_{2}	White_{2}	Moncur_{1}
20/12/92	Leicester City	A	2–4	Hammond	Kerslake	Horlock	Hoddle	Calderwood	Taylor	Hazard_{2}	Moncur_{1}	Maskell	Ling	Summerbee	White_{1}	Bodin_{2}
09/01/93	Oxford United	A	1–0	Digby	Kerslake	Bodin	Hoddle	Calderwood	Taylor	Hazard	Gray	Maskell	Ling	White	Mitchell	Horlock
12/01/93	Birmingham City	H	0–0	Digby	Kerslake	Bodin	Hoddle	Calderwood	Taylor	Hazard	Gray	Maskell_{1}	Horlock	White	Mitchell_{1}	Summerbee
16/01/93	Charlton Athletic	H	2–2	Digby	Kerslake	Bodin	Summerbee	Calderwood	Taylor	Hazard	Gray	Maskell_{1}	Horlock	White	Mitchell_{1}	MacLaren
26/01/93	Grimsby Town	A	1–2	Digby	Kerslake_{2}	Bodin	Hoddle	Calderwood	Taylor	Hazard	MacLaren	Maskell	Ling_{1}	White	Mitchell_{1}	Summerbee_{2}
30/01/93	Wolverhampton Wanderers	H	1–0	Digby	Kerslake	Bodin	Hoddle	Calderwood	Taylor	Hazard_{1}	MacLaren	Maskell_{2}	Ling	White	Summerbee_{2}	Mitchell_{1}
06/02/93	Sunderland	A	1–0	Digby	Kerslake	Bodin	Hoddle	Calderwood	Taylor	Summerbee	MacLaren	Mitchell	Ling	White	Close	Horlock
13/02/93	Millwall	H	3–0	Digby	Kerslake	Bodin	Hoddle	Calderwood	Taylor	Summerbee	MacLaren	Mitchell	Ling	White	Close	Horlock
20/02/93	Cambridge United	A	0–1	Digby	Kerslake	Bodin	Hoddle	Calderwood	Taylor	Summerbee	MacLaren	Maskell_{1}	Ling	White	Close_{1}	Murray
23/02/93	Tranmere Rovers	H	2–0	Digby	Kerslake	Bodin	Hoddle	Calderwood	Taylor	Summerbee	MacLaren	Mitchell	Ling	White	Close	Hunt
27/02/93	Portsmouth	H	1–0	Digby	Kerslake	Bodin	Hoddle	Calderwood	Taylor	Summerbee	MacLaren	Mitchell	Ling	White	Close	Murray
06/03/93	Watford	A	4–0	Digby	Kerslake	Bodin	Hoddle	Calderwood	Taylor	Summerbee	MacLaren	Mitchell	Ling	White	Close	Murray
10/03/93	Southend United	A	1–1	Digby	Summerbee	Bodin	Viveash	Calderwood	Taylor	Hunt	MacLaren	Mitchell	Ling	White	Close	Marwood
13/03/93	Newcastle United	H	2–1	Digby	Summerbee	Bodin	Viveash	Calderwood	Taylor	Hunt_{1}	MacLaren	Mitchell	Ling	White	Close	Marwood_{1}
17/03/93	Luton Town	A	0–0	Digby	Summerbee	Bodin	Viveash	Calderwood	Taylor	Hunt_{1}	MacLaren	Mitchell	Ling	White	Close	Marwood_{1}
21/03/93	Derby County	A	1–2	Digby	Summerbee	Bodin	Viveash_{1}	Calderwood	Taylor	Marwood_{2}	MacLaren	Mitchell	Ling	White	Close_{2}	Hoddle_{1}
24/03/93	Bristol City	H	2–1	Digby	Summerbee	Bodin	Hoddle	Calderwood	Taylor	Marwood	MacLaren	Mitchell_{2}	Ling_{1}	White	Close_{2}	Hunt_{1}
27/03/93	Brentford	A	0–0	Digby	Summerbee	Bodin	Hoddle	Calderwood	Taylor	Marwood	MacLaren_{1}	Mitchell	Ling	White	Close_{1}	Hunt
03/04/93	Peterborough United	H	1–0	Digby	Summerbee	Bodin	Hoddle	Calderwood	Taylor	Marwood	MacLaren	Mitchell	Ling	White	Close	Hunt
06/04/93	Tranmere Rovers	A	1–3	Digby	Summerbee	Bodin	Hoddle	Calderwood	Taylor	Marwood_{2}	MacLaren	Mitchell	Ling_{1}	White	Close_{2}	Hazard_{1}
10/04/93	Luton Town	H	1–0	Digby	Summerbee	Bodin	Hoddle	Calderwood	Taylor	Marwood_{1}	MacLaren_{2}	Maskell	Ling	Close	Hazard_{1}	Hamon_{2}
12/04/93	Birmingham City	A	6–4	Digby	Summerbee	Bodin	Hoddle	Calderwood	Taylor	Hazard	MacLaren	Mitchell	Ling	Maskell	Close	Marwood
17/04/93	Leicester City	H	1–1	Digby	Summerbee	Bodin	Hoddle	Calderwood	Taylor	Hazard	MacLaren	Mitchell	Ling	Maskell_{1}	White	Marwood_{1}
24/04/93	Notts County	A	1–1	Digby	Summerbee	Bodin	Hoddle	Calderwood	Taylor	Hazard	MacLaren	Mitchell	Ling	Maskell_{1}	White_{1}	Marwood
02/05/93	West Ham United	H	1–3	Digby	Summerbee	Viveash_{1}	Hoddle	Calderwood	Taylor	Hazard	MacLaren	Mitchell	Ling	White_{2}	Maskell_{2}	Marwood_{1}
08/05/93	Barnsley	A	0–1	Digby	Summerbee	Horlock	Hoddle	Calderwood	Taylor	Hazard_{1}	MacLaren	Maskell	Ling	Hamon_{2}	Moncur_{1}	Marwood_{2}

=== Division One play-offs line-ups ===
Date	Opposition	V	Score	1	2	3	4	5	6	7	8	9	10	11	12	14
16/05/93	Tranmere Rovers	H	3–1	Digby	Summerbee	Bodin	Hoddle	Calderwood	Taylor	Moncur_{2}	MacLaren	Mitchell	Ling	Maskell_{1}	White_{1}	Hazard_{2}
19/05/93	Tranmere Rovers	A	2–3	Digby	Summerbee	Bodin	Hoddle	Calderwood	Taylor	Moncur	MacLaren	Mitchell	Ling	White_{1}	Hazard	Maskell_{1}
31/05/93	Leicester City	N	4–3	Digby	Summerbee	Bodin	Hoddle	Calderwood	Taylor	Moncur_{2}	MacLaren	Mitchell	Ling	Maskell_{1}	White_{1}	Hazard_{2}

_{1} 1st Substitution, _{2} 2nd Substitution.

=== F.A. Cup line-ups ===
Date	Opposition	V	Score	1	2	3	4	5	6	7	8	9	10	11	12	14
04/01/93	Queens Park Rangers	A	0–3	Hammond	Kerslake	Bodin	Hoddle	Mitchell	Taylor	Hazard	Horlock_{1}	Maskell_{2}	Ling	White	Summerbee_{1}	Murray_{2}

_{1} 1st Substitution, _{2} 2nd Substitution.

=== League Cup line-ups ===
Date	Opposition	V	Score	1	2	3	4	5	6	7	8	9	10	11	12	14
23/09/92	Torquay United	A	6–0	Digby	Kerslake	Bodin	Hoddle_{2}	Calderwood	Taylor	Hazard	Moncur_{1}	Maskell	Ling	Mitchell	Summerbee_{1}	White_{2}
06/10/92	Torquay United	H	3–2	Hammond	Kerslake	Horlock	Hoddle	Calderwood	Taylor	Hazard_{1}	Summerbee	White	Ling_{2}	Mitchell	Close_{1}	Phillips_{2}
27/10/92	Oldham Athletic	H	0–1	Hammond	Kerslake	Horlock	Hoddle	Calderwood	Taylor	Hazard	Summerbee	Maskell	Ling_{1}	Mitchell	White_{1}	Viveash

_{1} 1st Substitution, _{2} 2nd Substitution.

=== Anglo-Italian Cup line-ups ===
Date	Opposition	V	Score	1	2	3	4	5	6	7	8	9	10	11	12	14
01/09/92	Oxford United	A	3–1	Digby	O'Sullivan	Bodin	Hunt	Calderwood	Viveash	Summerbee	Close	Maskell_{1}	Ling	Berkley	White_{1}	Murray
16/09/92	Brentford	H	1–2	Digby	Kerslake	Bodin	Summerbee	Calderwood	Taylor	Hazard	Moncur	Maskell_{1}	Ling	Mitchell	White_{1}	Viveash

=== Appearances ===
Last updated 28 June 2011

No.	Pos	Nat	Player	Total		Division One		FA Cup		League Cup		AIC	
No.	Pos	Nat	Player	Apps	Goals	Apps	Goals	Apps	Goals	Apps	Goals	Apps	Goals
	MF	(England) ENG	Austin Berkley	1	1	0+0	0	0+0	0	0+0	0	1+0	1
	DF	(Wales) WAL	Paul Bodin	42	12	37+1	12	1+0	0	1+0	0	2+0	0
	DF	(Scotland) SCO	Colin Calderwood	54	2	49+0	2	0+0	0	3+0	0	2+0	0
	FW	(England) ENG	Shaun Close	9	0	1+6	0	0+0	0	0+1	0	1+0	0
	GK	(England) ENG	Fraser Digby	39	0	36+0	0	0+0	0	1+0	0	2+0	0
	GK	(England) ENG	Nicky Hammond	16	0	13+0	0	1+0	0	2+0	0	0+0	0
	FW	(England) ENG	Chris Hamon	2	0	1+1	0	0+0	0	0+0	0	0+0	0
	MF	(England) ENG	Micky Hazard	39	3	30+4	3	1+0	0	3+0	0	1+0	0
	DF	(England) ENG	Glenn Hoddle	49	3	44+1	2	1+0	0	3+0	1	0+0	0
	FW	(England) ENG	Paul Hunt	6	0	3+2	0	0+0	0	0+0	0	1+0	0
	MF	(Northern Ireland) NIR	Kevin Horlock	17	1	13+1	1	1+0	0	2+0	0	0+0	0
	MF	(England) ENG	Martin Ling	52	4	46+0	3	1+0	0	3+0	1	2+0	0
	MF	(Scotland) SCO	Ross MacLaren	25	0	25+0	0	0+0	0	0+0	0	0+0	0
	MF	(England) ENG	Brian Marwood	11	1	6+5	1	0+0	0	0+0	0	0+0	0
	FW	(England) ENG	Craig Maskell	41	23	34+2	21	1+0	0	2+0	1	2+0	1
	FW	(Australia) AUS	Dave Mitchell	49	16	40+4	12	1+0	0	3+0	3	1+0	1
	MF	(England) ENG	John Moncur	19	2	14+3	2	0+0	0	1+0	0	1+0	0
	DF	(England) ENG	Eddie Murray	1	0	0+0	0	0+1	0	0+0	0	0+0	0
	DF	(Ireland) EIR	Wayne O'Sullivan	1	0	0+0	0	0+0	0	0+0	0	1+0	0
	MF	(England) ENG	Marcus Phillips	1	0	0+0	0	0+0	0	0+1	0	0+0	0
	DF	(England) ENG	Nicky Summerbee	48	4	39+3	3	0+1	0	2+1	0	2+0	1
	DF	(England) ENG	Shaun Taylor	54	13	49+0	12	1+0	0	3+0	1	1+0	0
	DF	(England) ENG	Adi Viveash	6	0	5+0	0	0+0	0	0+0	0	1+0	0
	FW	(England) ENG	Steve White	43	9	21+16	7	1+0	0	1+2	2	0+2	0
Players who had a loan spell or left the club during the season:
	DF	(England) ENG	David Kerslake (left for Leeds United on 11/03/93)	36	0	30+1	0	1+0	0	3+0	0	1+0	0
	MF	(England) ENG	Andy Gray (on loan from Tottenham Hotspur)	3	0	3+0	0	0+0	0	0+0	0	0+0	0
