= 1994–95 Swindon Town F.C. season =

Swindon Town
1994–95 season
- Chairman: Rikki Hunt
- Manager: John Gorman (until 21 November); Steve McMahon (from 28 November)
- Stadium: The County Ground
- First Division: 21st (relegated)
- FA Cup: Fourth round
- League Cup: Semi finals
- Top goalscorer: League: Fjørtoft (16); All: Fjørtoft (26)
- Average home league attendance: 9,744

During the 1994–95 English football season, Swindon Town F.C. competed in the Football League First Division.

== Season summary ==
After a bright start to the 1994–95 season, a poor run of five defeats in six games resulted in Gorman's sacking in November 1994 with Swindon struggling near the foot of Division One. 33-year-old Manchester City midfielder Steve McMahon took over but, despite a run to the League Cup semi-finals, Swindon suffered a second successive relegation and slipped into Division Two.

== Final league table ==
Pos	Team	Pld	W	D	L	GF	GA	GD	Pts	Qualification or relegation
19	West Bromwich Albion	46	16	10	20	51	57	−6	58	
20	Sunderland	46	12	18	16	41	45	−4	54	
21	Swindon Town (R)	46	12	12	22	54	73	−19	48	Relegation to the Second Division
22	Burnley (R)	46	11	13	22	49	74	−25	46	Relegation to the Second Division
23	Bristol City (R)	46	11	12	23	42	63	−21	45	Relegation to the Second Division

Rules for classification: 1) Points; 2) Goals scored; 3) Goal difference
(R) Relegated

== Results ==
Swindon Town's score comes first

=== Legend ===
Win	Draw	Loss

=== Football League First Division ===
Date	Opponent	Venue	Result	Attendance	Scorers
14 August 1994	Port Vale	H	2–0	10,431	Fjørtoft, Scott
20 August 1994	Tranmere Rovers	A	2–3	8,482	Fjørtoft (2)
27 August 1994	Watford	H	1–0	9,781	Ling
31 August 1994	West Bromwich Albion	H	0–0	11,188	
3 September 1994	Notts County	A	1–0	6,537	Fjørtoft
11 September 1994	Derby County	H	1–1	9,054	Fjørtoft
14 September 1994	Reading	H	1–0	11,551	Scott
17 September 1994	Charlton Athletic	A	0–1	9,794	
24 September 1994	Grimsby Town	H	3–2	8,219	Bodin (2, 1 pen), Fjørtoft
1 October 1994	Barnsley	A	1–2	3,911	Taylor
8 October 1994	Wolverhampton Wanderers	H	3–2	14,036	Bodin, Scott, Beauchamp
15 October 1994	Portsmouth	A	3–4	10,610	Bodin (pen), Fjørtoft (2)
22 October 1994	Southend United	H	2–2	9,909	Fjørtoft (2)
29 October 1994	Middlesbrough	A	1–3	17,328	Fjørtoft
1 November 1994	Bolton Wanderers	A	0–3	10,046	
5 November 1994	Millwall	H	1–2	9,311	Bodin (pen)
20 November 1994	Bristol City	A	2–3	9,086	Scott (2)
23 November 1994	Burnley	H	1–1	7,654	Scott
26 November 1994	Luton Town	H	1–2	9,455	Scott
3 December 1994	Southend United	A	0–2	5,803	
10 December 1994	Tranmere Rovers	H	2–2	8,608	Bodin, Fjørtoft
17 December 1994	Port Vale	A	2–2	7,747	Taylor, Fjørtoft
26 December 1994	Stoke City	A	0–0	17,662	
27 December 1994	Sheffield United	H	1–3	11,007	Fjørtoft
31 December 1994	Oldham Athletic	A	1–1	8,917	Ling
15 January 1995	Middlesbrough	H	2–1	8,888	Fjørtoft, Horlock
4 February 1995	Burnley	A	2–1	10,960	Thorne (2)
15 February 1995	Bristol City	H	0–3	9,881	
18 February 1995	Luton Town	A	0–3	6,595	
25 February 1995	Barnsley	H	0–0	8,158	
1 March 1995	Millwall	A	1–3	5,950	Beauchamp
4 March 1995	Grimsby Town	A	1–1	4,934	Taylor
11 March 1995	Watford	A	0–2	7,123	
15 March 1995	Sunderland	H	1–0	8,233	Thorne
19 March 1995	West Bromwich Albion	A	5–2	12,960	Thorne (3), Fjørtoft, Gooden
22 March 1995	Derby County	A	1–3	16,839	Viveash
25 March 1995	Charlton Athletic	H	0–1	9,106	
1 April 1995	Reading	A	0–3	12,565	
5 April 1995	Bolton Wanderers	H	0–1	8,100	
8 April 1995	Oldham Athletic	H	3–1	8,722	Viveash, Beauchamp, Taylor
15 April 1995	Sheffield United	A	2–2	12,217	Gooden, Ling
17 April 1995	Stoke City	H	0–1	10,549	
22 April 1995	Sunderland	A	0–1	16,874	
29 April 1995	Portsmouth	H	0–2	9,220	
3 May 1995	Notts County	H	3–0	6,553	Hamon, Thorne (2)
7 May 1995	Wolverhampton Wanderers	A	1–1	26,245	Thorne

=== FA Cup ===
Round	Date	Opponent	Venue	Result	Attendance	Goalscorers
R3	7 January 1995	Marlow	H	2–0	7,007	Fjørtoft, Nijholt
R4	28 January 1995	Watford	A	0–1	11,202	

=== League Cup ===
Round	Date	Opponent	Venue	Result	Attendance	Goalscorers
R2 First Leg	21 September 1994	Charlton Athletic	H	1–3	4,842	Scott
R2 Second Leg	27 September 1994	Charlton Athletic	A	4–1 (won 5–4 on agg)	4,932	Fjørtoft (3), Petterson (own goal)
R3	26 October 1994	Brighton & Hove Albion	A	1–1	11,382	Thomson
R3R	9 November 1994	Brighton & Hove Albion	H	4–1	6,482	Scott (2), Fjørtoft (2)
R4	30 November 1994	Derby County	H	2–1	8,920	Fjørtoft (2)
R5	11 January 1995	Millwall	H	3–1	11,772	Mutch (2), Fjørtoft
SF First Leg	12 February 1995	Bolton Wanderers	H	2–1	15,341	Thorne (2) 38', 76'
SF Second Leg	8 March 1995	Bolton Wanderers	A	1–3 (lost 3–4 on agg)	19,851	Fjørtoft 57'

== Squad ==
Note: Flags indicate national team as defined under FIFA eligibility rules; some limited exceptions apply. Players may hold more than one non-FIFA nationality.

No.	Pos.	Nation	Player
—	GK	(England) ENG	Fraser Digby
—	GK	(England) ENG	Nick Hammond
—	DF	(England) ENG	Dean Hooper
—	DF	(England) ENG	Brian Kilcline
—	DF	(England) ENG	Shaun Taylor
—	DF	(England) ENG	Andy Thomson
—	DF	(England) ENG	Carl Tiler (on loan from Nottingham Forest)
—	DF	(England) ENG	Adi Viveash
—	DF	(England) ENG	Ian Culverhouse
—	DF	(England) ENG	Jason Drysdale
—	DF	(England) ENG	Terry Fenwick
—	DF	(Netherlands) NED	Luc Nijholt
—	DF	(Republic of Ireland) IRL	Wayne O'Sullivan
—	DF	(England) ENG	Jamie Pitman
—	DF	(England) ENG	Mark Robinson
—	DF	(Wales) WAL	Paul Bodin
—	DF	(England) ENG	Andy Todd (on loan from Middlesbrough)

No.	Pos.	Nation	Player
—	DF	(England) ENG	Eddie Murray
—	DF	(England) ENG	Adrian Whitbread
—	MF	(Scotland) SCO	Ross MacLaren
—	MF	(England) ENG	Joey Beauchamp
—	MF	(England) ENG	Austin Berkley
—	MF	(England) ENG	Ty Gooden
—	MF	(Northern Ireland) NIR	Kevin Horlock
—	MF	(England) ENG	Martin Ling
—	MF	(England) ENG	Steve McMahon (player-manager)
—	MF	(England) ENG	Neil Webb (on loan from Nottingham Forest)
—	MF	(England) ENG	Ben Worrall
—	FW	(Norway) NOR	Jan Åge Fjørtoft
—	FW	(England) ENG	Chris Hamon
—	FW	(England) ENG	Andy Mutch
—	FW	(England) ENG	Keith Scott
—	FW	(England) ENG	Peter Throne
—	FW	(England) ENG	Steve White
