= 1993 Football League First Division play-off final =

Association football match in London

Swindon Town	Leicester City
4	3
- Date: 31 May 1993
- Venue: Wembley Stadium, London
- Referee: David Elleray (Harrow)
- Attendance: 73,802
- Weather: Sunny

The 1993 Football League First Division play-off final was an association football match which was played on 31 May 1993 at Wembley Stadium, London, between Leicester City and Swindon Town. The match was to determine the third and final team to gain promotion from the 1992–93 Football League First Division, the second tier of English football, to the Premier League. The top two teams in the Football League First Division gained automatic promotion to the Premiership, while the teams placed from third to sixth in the table took part in play-off semi-finals; Swindon Town ended the season in fifth position while Leicester City finished sixth. The winners of these semi-finals competed for the final place for the 1993–94 season in the Premiership. Winning the game was estimated to be worth around £5 million to the successful team.

Swindon took a 3–0 lead as they scored three goals in eleven minutes either side of half time. Glenn Hoddle, Swindon's player-manager, opened the scoring late in the first half and early second-half goals from Craig Maskell and Shaun Taylor made it 3–0 after 53 minutes. Leicester's Julian Joachim scored four minutes later, and with further goals from Steve Walsh and Steve Thompson, the score was level at 3–3. With six minutes of the match remaining, the referee David Elleray awarded Swindon a penalty which was converted by Paul Bodin, securing a 4–3 victory. The win saw Swindon promoted to the top tier of English football for the first time in their club's 73-year League history.

Four days after the match, Hoddle was confirmed as player-manager at Chelsea. In their following season, Swindon finished bottom of the Premiership and were relegated back to the second tier having conceded a record 100 goals. Leicester ended their next season in fourth place in the First Division and secured promotion to the Premiership with a 2–1 win over Derby County in the play-off final.

== Route to the final ==
Football League First Division final table, leading positions
Pos	Team	Pld	W	D	L	GF	GA	GD	Pts
1	Newcastle United	46	29	9	8	92	38	+54	96
2	West Ham United	46	26	10	10	81	41	+40	88
3	Portsmouth	46	26	10	10	80	46	+34	88
4	Tranmere Rovers	46	23	10	13	72	56	+16	79
5	Swindon Town	46	21	13	12	74	59	+15	76
6	Leicester City	46	22	10	14	71	64	+7	76

Swindon Town finished the regular 1992–93 season in fifth place in the Football League First Division, the second tier of the English football league system, one place ahead of Leicester City. Both therefore missed out on the two automatic places for promotion to the Premiership and instead took part in the play-offs, along with Portsmouth (who finished third) and Tranmere Rovers (who finished fourth), to determine the third promoted team. Swindon finished twelve points behind West Ham United (who were promoted in second place) and twenty behind league winners Newcastle United. Leicester City ended the season level on points with Swindon but with an inferior goal difference.

Swindon Town faced Tranmere Rovers in their play-off semi-final and the first leg was played at the County Ground, Swindon, on 16 May 1993. Swindon took the lead within two minutes of the kick-off when a cross from Nicky Summerbee was headed past Eric Nixon in the Tranmere goal by his own defender Steve Vickers. The lead was doubled a minute later when Nixon mishandled a shot from Ross MacLaren, allowing Dave Mitchell to score. A John Aldridge goal in the fourth minute was disallowed for a push on Glenn Hoddle, but Craig Maskell halved Tranmere's deficit in the 27th minute. John Morrissey scored Swindon's third on 58 minutes, and the match ended 3–1. The second leg of the semi-final was played three days later at Prenton Park. Swindon took the lead on 30 minutes, with a goal from John Moncur following a through ball from Martin Ling. Just before half time, Mark Proctor levelled the game with a volley. Pat Nevin then scored after the Swindon goalkeeper Fraser Digby dropped a cross. Maskell equalised before Hoddle fouled Morrissey to concede a penalty. Kenny Irons scored from the spot, but Swindon held on; despite losing the match 3–2, they progressed to the final with a 5–4 aggregate victory.

Leicester City's play-off semi-final opponents were Portsmouth and the first leg took place on 16 May 1993. The match was hosted at Nottingham Forest's home stadium, the City Ground, as Leicester's Filbert Street was undergoing redevelopment. The game, described by Paul Weaver in The Guardian as "dreadful", was "partially redeemed by a stunning goal" from Julian Joachim, a second-half substitute for Leicester. It was the only goal of the game which ended 1–0. The second leg was played at Fratton Park three days later and was goalless at half time. Six minutes into the second half, Portsmouth took the lead when Alan McLoughlin scored from a George Lawrence header. Within two minutes Leicester had equalised when Ian Ormondroyd found the target following a deflected shot from David Oldfield. Steve Thompson then put Leicester ahead in the 69th minute with a shot from the edge of the penalty area beating the Portsmouth goalkeeper Alan Knight. Three minutes later, Bjørn Kristensen levelled the score once more with an 18-yard (16 m) curling shot into the far corner of the Leicester goal. The game ended 2–2, and ensured Leicester a 3–2 aggregate victory.

== Match ==
=== Background ===
This was Leicester's second appearance in the First Division play-off final: they had lost 1–0 to Blackburn Rovers in the previous season's final. They had played in the second tier of English football since they were relegated from the First Division in the 1986–87 season. Swindon had beaten Gillingham 2–0 in a replay after the 1987 Football League Third Division play-off final, which was played over two legs, had ended 2–2 on aggregate. Swindon had played in the second tier since that promotion. They had also won a play-off final at Wembley Stadium when they beat Sunderland 1–0 in the 1990 Football League Second Division play-off final. However, the club's promotion was overturned by the Football League as a result of financial irregularities. As a result, Swindon were relegated to the Third Division, but that decision was later overturned on appeal. As such, Swindon were aiming to be promoted to the top flight of English football for the first time in the 73-year League history of the club.

Leicester's top scorer during the regular season was Steve Walsh with fifteen goals in all competitions, followed by Joachim and David Lowe on twelve. Maskell had scored the most goals for Swindon with twenty-one in all competitions, while Mitchell had scored fifteen. In the matches played between both sides during the regular season, Leicester had won their home game 4–2 in December 1992, while the return fixture at the County Ground the following April ended in a 1–1 draw.

The referee for the match was David Elleray of Harrow on the Hill. Prior to the match, there had been considerable speculation over the future of Swindon's player-manager Hoddle who had been linked with Premiership clubs Chelsea and Tottenham Hotspur. He was able to select a full-strength squad as he had been able to persuade the Australia national soccer team to release Mitchell from the 1994 FIFA World Cup qualification – OFC second round fixture against New Zealand. Hoddle also selected Moncur, who had sustained bruised ribs against Tranmere, in preference to Micky Hazard. The Leicester manager Brian Little named Joachim in the starting line-up in preference to Lowe, in a 4–4–2 formation described in the Staffordshire Sentinel as "imaginative", pairing 18-year-old Joachim in attack alongside Walsh. Prior to the match, Little suggested: "I don't think it would be right to go into the game hoping to keep things tight to start with". According to Deloitte, the match was worth £5 million to the promoted club through increases in matchday, commercial and broadcasting income. Former player Alan Hudson, writing in the Staffordshire Sentinel, believed Swindon to be favourites to win the match. McLoughlin, who scored the winning goal for Swindon in the 1990 play-off final, also suggested that his former club would defeat Leicester.

=== Summary ===
The match kicked off in sunny conditions in front of a Wembley crowd of 73,802. Although Swindon dominated possession during the early stages of the first half, they were unable to convert any chances. Cutting in from the left wing, a Paul Bodin cross was cleared by Leicester to deny Mitchell. Summerbee was shown a yellow card for a foul as Leicester sought to increase pressure on Swindon, and although Digby failed to hold onto a Joachim cross, he successfully parried it away. Despite Leicester's higher tempo, it was Swindon who took the lead three minutes before half time. A backheel from Maskell found Hoddle whose shot curled past Kevin Poole in the Leicester goal. It was his first goal since the opening day of the season, and his ninth goal at Wembley.

Two minutes after the break, Maskell doubled Swindon's lead. After a one-two with Moncur, he struck the ball into the goal inside the far post. In the 53rd minute, Shaun Taylor made it 3–0 with a header after Poole was hesitant to claim the ball. Walsh struck over the bar before, four minutes later, Joachim scored his fourteenth goal of the season after converting a rebound off the post of the Swindon goal. In the 68th minute, a cross beyond the far post was passed back across the box, over Digby, and was headed in by Walsh to make it 3–2. Author Dick Mattick suggested that at this point in the game, "panic set in" for Swindon and Leicester started "cutting swathes through the [Swindon] Town defence". Thompson completed Leicester's comeback a minute later after scoring with a low shot. Swindon's Ling then saw his strike saved by Poole, before Taylor's header was cleared off the line by Leicester. Mitchell's shot was then smothered before the referee awarded Swindon a penalty in the 84th minute: Hoddle played a 50-yard (46 m) pass to substitute Steve White who fell in the Leicester penalty area after contact with both Poole and Colin Hill. Elleray adjudged it to have been a foul, and Bodin stepped up to take the spot kick. Despite a "nonchalant" run-up, his carefully taken strike beat Poole to his left. No further goals were scored, the match ended 4–3 and Swindon were promoted to the Premiership.

=== Details ===
31 May 1993
15:00 BST

Leicester City	3–4	Swindon Town
Joachim 57'; Walsh 68'; Thompson 69'		Hoddle 42'; Maskell 47'; Taylor 53'; Bodin 84' (pen.)

Wembley Stadium, London
Attendance: 73,802
Referee: David Elleray (Harrow)

Leicester City	Swindon Town

GK	1	(England) Kevin Poole
RB	2	(England) Gary Mills (c)
LB	3	(England) Mike Whitlow
CB	4	(England) Richard Smith
FW	5	(England) Steve Walsh
CB	6	(Northern Ireland) Colin Hill
RM	7	(England) David Oldfield
CM	8	(England) Steve Thompson
FW	9	(England) Julian Joachim
CM	10	(England) Steve Agnew
LM	11	(England) Lee Philpott
Substitutes:
FW	12	(England) Ian Ormondroyd
MF	14	(England) Colin Gibson
Manager:
(England) Brian Little

GK	1	(England) Fraser Digby
RB	2	(England) Nicky Summerbee	Booked
LB	3	(Wales) Paul Bodin
SW	4	(England) Glenn Hoddle
CB	5	(Scotland) Colin Calderwood (c)
CB	6	(England) Shaun Taylor
CM	7	(England) John Moncur		(substituted off) 88'
LM	8	(Scotland) Ross MacLaren
FW	9	(Australia) Dave Mitchell
RM	10	(England) Martin Ling
FW	11	(England) Craig Maskell		(substituted off) 78'
Substitutes:
FW	12	(England) Steve White		(substituted on) 78'
MF	14	(England) Micky Hazard		(substituted on) 88'
Player-manager:
(England) Glenn Hoddle

== Post-match ==
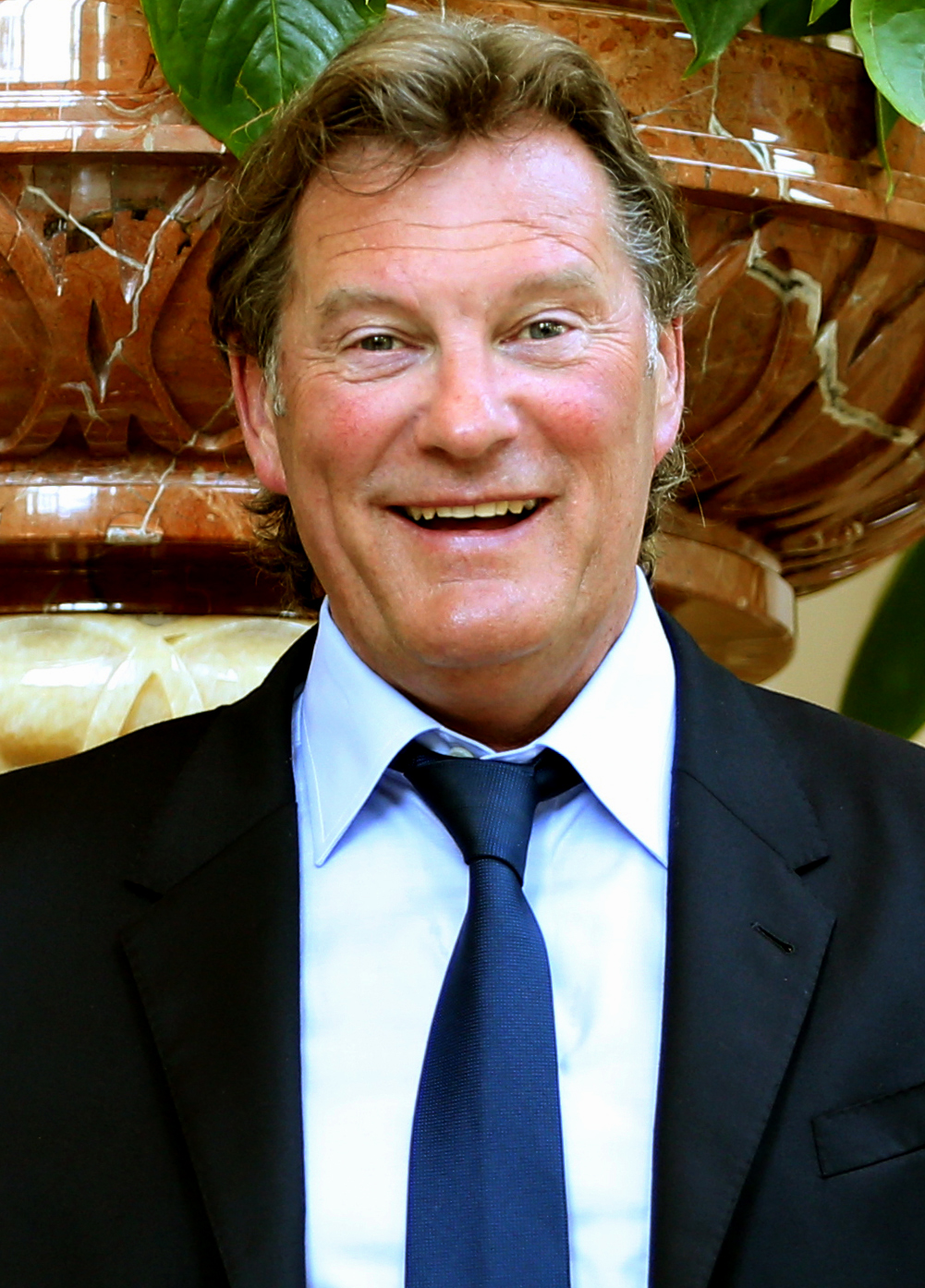
Glenn Hoddle (pictured in 2014) left Swindon for Chelsea four days after the match.

Trevor Haylett, writing in The Independent, described the match as an "absolute cracker" and that the late penalty was "the last act of a heart-stopping drama". Little was stoic about the late penalty award: "I was surprised it was given ... But I'm not going to change the decision, am I?" Referencing Leicester's defeat in the 1992 play-off final as a result of a penalty, he added: "It's almost the same speech as last year". The match was deemed "a minor English classic climaxing the domestic season" by Russell Thomas of The Guardian. He went on to suggest that Swindon's 73-year journey to the top flight of English football was "completed with a flourish worthy of one of the country's most pleasing teams". Clive Baskerville wrote in the Reading Evening Post that the spectators were "entertained by a standard of football rarely seen [that] season". He also suggested that Hoddle should be considered as the next England national football team manager. The Evening Herald in Dublin reported that it was an "extraordinary play-off final". In 2009, Eurosport listed it as the 94th best association football match of all-time.

Hoddle noted that it was his proudest moment in football, stating: "To take a club up that has never been in the top flight and in these circumstances is a great feeling". He pointed out: "We have sold something like £2 million worth of players in two years and this year we have spent just £100,000 in a swap deal for Craig Maskell". After the game, Hoddle refused to be drawn on his future with Swindon, saying "I want people tomorrow to read about Swindon's promotion, not Glenn Hoddle ... I'm under contract to Swindon, so there's no question to answer". Referring to Swindon's cancelled promotion in 1990, he reflected: "We've wiped the slate clean after three years". Hoddle's assistant John Gorman noted: "It's fantastic, unbelievable. I won promotion at Carlisle but there's no comparison".

On the evening of 2 June, a bus-top parade through the town was held during which thousands of fans held aloft banners "in a final plea to the management duo" to remain with the club. Winning goal-scorer Bodin was forced to miss the celebration as he joined up with the Wales national football team who were playing a World Cup qualifier against the Faroe Islands. MacClaren, Hazard and Brian Marwood were also absent, having left to go on holiday. Club chairman Ray Hardman confirmed that although a two-hour board meeting had taken place prior to the parade, Hoddle's position had not been discussed. Four days after the match, Hoddle was confirmed as player-manager at Chelsea. Gorman had initially resigned, alongside Hoddle, but was persuaded to stay by Hardman after being offered the manager's position. Hoddle was unrepentant, and offered no apology for his departure: "It was a very sad day when I left Swindon and it was a very emotional decision to make ... you have to do hard things that are right for yourself and [Chelsea manager] is the right job for me ... I thought it was time to move on". In his first season with the London club, he led Chelsea to 14th position in the league and an appearance at Wembley in the 1994 FA Cup Final where they lost 4–0 to Manchester United.

In their following season, Swindon finished bottom of the Premiership and were relegated back to the second tier. Their drop back to the Second Division was confirmed after a 4–2 home defeat to Wimbledon on 23 April 1994. By the end of the season, they had conceded 100 goals, which, as of 2020, is a Premier League record. Leicester ended their next season in fourth place in the First Division, and qualified for the play-offs. They defeated Tranmere Rovers in the semi-final before securing promotion to the Premiership with a 2–1 win over Derby County, their East Midlands rivals, in the play-off final.
