= 1991–92 Swindon Town F.C. season =

Swindon Town
1991–92 season
- Chairman: Ray Hardman
- Manager: Glenn Hoddle (player-manager)
- Stadium: County Ground
- Second Division: 8th
- FA Cup: Fifth round
- League Cup: Fourth round
- Full Members Cup: Second round
- Top goalscorer: League: Shearer (22); All: Shearer (32)
- Average home league attendance: 10,009

During the 1991–92 English football season, Swindon Town F.C. competed in the Football League Second Division.

== Season summary ==
In the 1991–92 season, Hoddle's first full season in charge saw a complete change in fortune where in November Swindon were at the top of the table. Unfortunately though, a run of two defeats and then six draws on the bounce saw Swindon slip out of the play-off places, and though they made their way back up the table, four defeats in early March put them just off the pace. Blackburn then attempted to put a huge dent in Swindon's promotion push - making an offer of £800,000 for 32-goal Shearer - and it was an offer that cash-strapped Swindon couldn't afford to refuse. Shearer left, and Swindon scored just seven goals in the nine games that followed, finishing eighth.

== Final league table ==
Pos	Team	Pld	W	D	L	GF	GA	GD	Pts	Qualification or relegation
6	Blackburn Rovers (O, P)	46	21	11	14	70	53	+17	74	Qualification for the Second Division play-offs
7	Charlton Athletic	46	20	11	15	54	48	+6	71	Qualification for the First Division (Note: From the 1992–93 season, the first tier became the Premier League, the second tier - then known as the Second Division - was renamed to the First Division, and the third tier - then known as the Third Division - was renamed to the Second Division.)
8	Swindon Town	46	18	15	13	69	55	+14	69	Qualification for the First Division
9	Portsmouth	46	19	12	15	65	51	+14	69	Qualification for the First Division
10	Watford	46	18	11	17	51	48	+3	65	Qualification for the First Division

Rules for classification: 1) Points; 2) Goal difference; 3) Goals scored
(O) Play-off winners; (P) Promoted

== Results ==
Swindon Town's score comes first

=== Legend ===
Win	Draw	Loss

=== Football League Second Division ===
Date	Opponent	Venue	Result	Attendance	Scorers
17 August 1991	Leicester City	H	0–0	12,426	
24 August 1991	Cambridge United	A	2–3	6,232	Shearer, Hazard (pen)
31 August 1991	Barnsley	H	3–1	7,449	White, Ling, Shearer
3 September 1991	Ipswich Town	A	4–1	11,002	White, Calderwood, Taylor, Hazard
7 September 1991	Port Vale	A	2–2	7,168	White, MacLaren
14 September 1991	Sunderland	H	5–3	11,417	White, Simpson, Hazard (2, 1 pen), Shearer
17 September 1991	Bristol Rovers	H	1–0	11,391	Jones
21 September 1991	Wolverhampton Wanderers	A	1–2	15,219	White
28 September 1991	Watford	H	3–1	8,863	Shearer, Simpson, Taylor
5 October 1991	Plymouth Argyle	A	4–0	6,208	Shearer (4)
12 October 1991	Derby County	H	1–2	11,883	Hazard (pen)
19 October 1991	Blackburn Rovers	H	2–1	10,717	White, Calderwood
26 October 1991	Brighton & Hove Albion	A	2–0	7,370	Shearer (2)
2 November 1991	Newcastle United	H	2–1	10,731	Calderwood, White
6 November 1991	Charlton Athletic	A	0–0	5,398	
9 November 1991	Southend United	A	2–3	7,709	White, Shearer
16 November 1991	Portsmouth	H	1–0	10,738	White (2)
22 November 1991	Tranmere Rovers	A	0–0	9,585	
30 November 1991	Grimsby Town	H	1–1	8,397	Simpson
7 December 1991	Middlesbrough	A	2–2	13,300	Simpson, Shearer
20 December 1991	Ipswich Town	H	0–0	7,404	
26 December 1991	Bristol City	A	1–1	14,636	Shearer
28 December 1991	Barnsley	A	1–1	8,357	Shearer
1 January 1992	Millwall	H	3–1	9,746	Shearer (2), Ling
11 January 1992	Cambridge United	H	0–2	10,878	
18 January 1992	Leicester City	A	1–3	14,226	Bodin
28 January 1992	Oxford United	H	2–1	8,926	Kerslake, Shearer
1 February 1992	Blackburn Rovers	A	1–2	14,887	Mitchell
4 February 1992	Bristol City	H	2–0	9,627	Jones, Shearer
8 February 1992	Brighton & Hove Albion	H	2–1	9,127	Calderwood (2)
22 February 1992	Grimsby Town	A	0–0	6,817	
29 February 1992	Middlesbrough	H	0–1	10,379	
7 March 1992	Oxford United	A	3–5	7,795	Close, Mitchell (2)
10 March 1992	Charlton Athletic	H	1–2	7,196	Shearer
14 March 1992	Newcastle United	A	1–3	23,138	Mitchell
17 March 1992	Tranmere Rovers	H	2–0	6,780	Shearer (2)
21 March 1992	Southend United	H	3–1	8,628	Shearer, Bodin (pen), Mitchell
28 March 1992	Portsmouth	A	1–1	16,007	Jones
4 April 1992	Port Vale	H	1–0	8,014	Jones
8 April 1992	Millwall	A	1–1	6,722	Gibson
12 April 1992	Bristol Rovers	A	1–1	6,905	Taylor
18 April 1992	Wolverhampton Wanderers	H	1–0	10,863	Ling
20 April 1992	Watford	A	0–0	9,911	
25 April 1992	Plymouth Argyle	H	1–0	10,463	Taylor
27 April 1992	Sunderland	A	0–0	16,716	
2 May 1992	Derby County	A	1–2	22,608	Hazard

=== FA Cup ===
Round	Date	Opponent	Venue	Result	Attendance	Goalscorers
R3	4 January 1992	Watford	H	3–2	10,133	Shearer (2), Mitchell
R4	25 January 1992	Cambridge United	A	3–0	7,428	Calderwood, Shearer (2)
R5	16 February 1992	Aston Villa	H	1–2	16,402	Mitchell

=== League Cup ===
Round	Date	Opponent	Venue	Result	Attendance	Goalscorers
R1 First Leg	20 August 1991	West Bromwich Albion	H	2–0	6,611	Mitchell, Hazard
R1 Second Leg	28 August 1991	West Bromwich Albion	A	2–2 (won 4–2 on agg)	8,522	Shearer (2)
R2 First Leg	25 September 1991	Millwall	A	2–2	6,048	White (2)
R2 Second Leg	8 October 1991	Millwall	H	3–1 (won 5–3 on agg)	7,137	Shearer (2), White
R3	29 October 1991	Huddersfield Town	A	4–1	10,088	Shearer (2), Summerbee, Taylor
R4	17 December 1991	Crystal Palace	H	0–1	10,044	

=== Full Members Cup ===
Round	Date	Opponent	Venue	Result	Attendance	Goalscorers
SR1	1 October 1991	Oxford United	H	3–3 (won 4–3 on pens)	5,868	White (2), MacLaren
SR2	23 October 1991	Chelsea	A	0–1	5,784	

== Squad ==
Note: Flags indicate national team as defined under FIFA eligibility rules; some limited exceptions apply. Players may hold more than one non-FIFA nationality.

Pos.	Nation	Player
GK	ENG	Nick Hammond
GK	ENG	Fraser Digby
DF	SCO	Colin Calderwood
DF	ENG	Shaun Taylor
DF	ENG	David Kerslake
DF	ENG	Glenn Hoddle (player-manager)
DF	WAL	Paul Bodin
DF	ENG	Adi Viveash
DF	ARG	Néstor Lorenzo
MF	ENG	Micky Hazard
MF	ENG	Tom Jones
MF	SCO	Ross MacLaren
MF	JAM	Fitzroy Simpson

Pos.	Nation	Player
MF	ENG	Nicky Summerbee
MF	ENG	Martin Ling
MF	ENG	Steve Foley
MF	IRL	Gary Waddock (on loan from QPR)
MF	ENG	John Moncur
MF	ENG	Dave Bennett
MF	ENG	Paul Trollope
FW	SCO	Duncan Shearer
FW	AUS	Dave Mitchell
FW	ENG	Steve White
FW	ENG	Terry Gibson (on loan from Wimbledon)
FW	ENG	Shaun Close
FW	ENG	Paul Hunt
