= Nijholt =

Nijholt is a surname. Notable people with the surname include:

- Gianluca Nijholt (born 1990), Dutch footballer, son of Luc
- Luc Nijholt (born 1961), Dutch footballer
