= George Summerbee =

English footballer (1914–1955)

Personal information
- Full name: George Michael Summerbee
- Date of birth: 22 October 1914
- Place of birth: Winchester, England
- Date of death: 19 April 1955 (aged 40)
- Place of death: Cirencester, England
- Height: 5 ft 9 1/2 in (1.77 m)
- Position: Wing-half

Youth career
- Basingstoke Town

Senior career*
Years	Team	Apps	(Gls)
1934–1935	Aldershot	19	(0)
1935–1946	Preston North End	3	(0)
- → Portsmouth (guest)
1946–1947	Chester	9	(0)
1947–1950	Barrow	122	(0)
1950–1952	Cheltenham Town		

Managerial career
- 1950–1952: Cheltenham Town
- * Club domestic league appearances and goals

George Summerbee (22 October 1914 – 19 April 1955) was an English professional footballer who played as a wing-half in The Football League for four clubs. He was father of Mike Summerbee and grandfather of Nicky Summerbee, who both played for Manchester City.

== Career ==
Summerbee was born in Winchester, England. He began his professional career with Aldershot, who he joined from non-league side Basingstoke Town in May 1934. While at Aldershot he played alongside his brother Gordon. In January 1935 George joined Football League First Division side Preston North End for £650. In 11 years at Deepdale, Summerbee made just three Football League appearances. During this spell he also spent several years during the Second World War guesting for Portsmouth, where he made 149 competitive appearances while working at a nearby aircraft factory.

He joined Football League Division Three North side Chester in May 1946 for £600, where again he struggled to earn a regular first-team place, and he moved to Barrow. He made more than 100 league appearances in three years at Holker Street, with his final Football League outing being against Lincoln City in May 1950.

Summerbee then joined non-league side Cheltenham Town as player-manager in 1950, but he left in 1952 after his contract was not renewed.

== Death ==
Three years after leaving Cheltenham, Summerbee died from Addison's disease in Cirencester, after a spell scouting for Bristol City.

His life story is featured alongside the other footballing members of his family in Fathers, Sons and Football (Colin Shindler, Headline Book Publishing, 2001).
