= Paul Heald =

English footballer (born 1968)

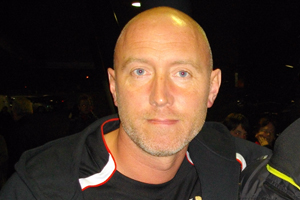
- Heald in 2011

Personal information
- Date of birth: 20 September 1968 (age 58)
- Place of birth: Wath-on-Dearne, England
- Height: 1.88 m (6 ft 2 in)
- Position: Goalkeeper

Senior career*
Years	Team	Apps	(Gls)
1987–1988	Sheffield United	0	(0)
1988–1995	Leyton Orient	176	(0)
1992	→ Coventry City (loan)	2	(0)
1992	→ Crystal Palace (loan)	0	(0)
1994	→ Swindon Town	2	(0)
1995–2004	Wimbledon	38	(0)
2002	→ Sheffield Wednesday (loan)	5	(0)
2004–2005	Milton Keynes Dons	0	(0)
Total		223	(0)
- * Club domestic league appearances and goals

Paul Heald (born 20 September 1968) is a former professional footballer who played as a goalkeeper for Milton Keynes Dons, Wimbledon, Leyton Orient and Sheffield United. He also had loan spells with Coventry City, Crystal Palace, Swindon Town and Sheffield Wednesday.

== Playing career ==
=== Leyton Orient ===
Heald was born in Wath-on-Dearne. He started his career at Sheffield United in 1987 and moved on to Leyton Orient where he made a total of 176 league appearances. Heald also had loan spells at Coventry, Crystal Palace and newly promoted Swindon Town. He was one of four goalkeepers used by Swindon during their Premier League season alongside Fraser Digby, Jon Sheffield and Nick Hammond.

=== Wimbledon ===
In 1995 a £125,000 fee took him to the Premier League side Wimbledon, where he acted mainly as backup for first Hans Segers and then Neil Sullivan. He played a total of 38 league games for the club.

In his first season at Wimbledon he was the goalkeeper who was unable to stop Tony Yeboah's famous strike in September 1995, the goal going on to win the BBC Goal of the Season.

Heald had a brief spell on loan with Sheffield Wednesday in 2002. He stayed with Wimbledon until the club's demise and replacement with a team based in Milton Keynes in 2003. He remained a player with the new Milton Keynes Dons until his retirement in 2005.

== Coaching career ==
Since retiring, Heald has continued as goalkeepers coach for Milton Keynes Dons until leaving in 2019.

== Honours ==
Leyton Orient

- Football League Fourth Division play-offs: 1989
