= Paul Bodin =

Welsh footballer (born 1964)

Personal information
- Full name: Paul John Bodin
- Date of birth: 13 September 1964 (age 62)
- Place of birth: Cardiff, Wales
- Height: 6 ft 0 in (1.83 m)
- Position: Left-back

Youth career
- Chelsea

Senior career*
Years	Team	Apps	(Gls)
1981–1982	Chelsea	0	(0)
1982	Newport County	0	(0)
1982–1985	Cardiff City	75	(4)
1985	Merthyr Tydfil		
1985–1988	Bath City		
1988	Newport County	6	(1)
1988–1991	Swindon Town	93	(9)
1991–1992	Crystal Palace	9	(0)
1991	→ Newcastle United (loan)	6	(0)
1992–1996	Swindon Town	146	(28)
1996–1998	Reading	39	(1)
1997	→ Wycombe Wanderers (loan)	5	(0)
1998–2001	Bath City		
2002	Devizes Town		
2002	Swindon Supermarine		
Total		379	(43)

International career
1983	Wales U21	1	(0)
1990–1994	Wales	23	(3)

Managerial career
- 1998–2001: Bath City (player-manager)
- 2011: Swindon Town (caretaker)
- 2017–2019: Wales U19
- 2019–2022: Wales U21
- * Club domestic league appearances and goals

Paul John Bodin (born 13 September 1964) is a Welsh former professional footballer and coach. His son, Billy Bodin, is also a professional footballer.

A former Chelsea youth team product, he moved to Cardiff City via Newport County in 1982. He helped Cardiff to win promotion out of the Third Division in 1982–83. He returned to non-League football with Merthyr Tydfil and Bath City in 1985 before rejoining Newport for a £15,000 fee in January 1988. Two months later he was sold to Swindon Town for twice this sum and became the club's first-choice left-back, helping them to win the 1990 Second Division play-off final and winning himself a place on the PFA Team of the Year in 1990–91. He was sold to Crystal Palace for £550,000 in March 1991 but was loaned out to Newcastle United before being sold back to Swindon for £225,000 in January 1992. Named as Swindon's Player of the Season in 1992–93, he scored the winning goal in the 1993 First Division play-off final. He featured in the Premier League, though after two successive relegations, he again earned a place on the Second Division's PFA Team of the Year in 1995–96. He then spent two seasons with Reading, as well as a loan spell at Wycombe Wanderers, before entering management with Bath City in 1998. He also won 23 caps for Wales between 1990 and 1994.

He spent three seasons as Bath City's manager before spending 12 years as a youth team coach at Swindon, also spending two games in caretaker charge of the first team in 2011. He then coached at Southampton's Academy before becoming assistant manager at Port Vale in May 2015. In August 2019, he was promoted from Wales under-19 coach to Wales under-21 head coach, remaining in the role until July 2022.

== Club career ==
=== Early career ===
Bodin began his career with Chelsea as a schoolboy, travelling via train to London Paddington station every weekend to train with the club. However, he left Stamford Bridge without making a first-team appearance for the "Blues" and moved onto a brief spell with Newport County under manager Len Ashurst, rejecting interest from his hometown side Cardiff City after watching Newport draw 2–2 with German side Carl Zeiss Jena in the UEFA Cup Winners' Cup. As a young trainee player, Bodin's role at the club included helping paint the stands at the club's Somerton Park ground. He eventually followed Ashurst to Cardiff. He was handed his professional debut on the opening day of the 1982–83 season against Wrexham at the age of 17. He quickly established himself in the first-team, making over 30 appearances in his first season, helping Ashurst's "Bluebirds" to promotion into the Second Division, finishing as Third Division runners-up to Portsmouth. Jimmy Goodfellow then led Cardiff to a 15th-place finish in the 1983–84 season, before Alan Durban took charge at Ninian Park and led Cardiff to relegation in the 1984–85 campaign, after which Bodin left the club and joined Merthyr Tydfil. During his time as a semi-professional, he supplemented his income by working as a roofer's assistant and insurance salesman.

=== Bath City and Newport County ===
He signed with Conference club Bath City, who finished 12th at the end of the 1985–86 season. He scored 21 goals for the "Romans" in the 1986–87 season, helping the Twerton Park club to a tenth-place finish. Bath were relegated to the Southern League out of the Conference in the 1987–88 season, though in January 1988 Bodin went in the opposite direction as he made a return to the English Football League with Brian Eastick's Newport for a £15,000 transfer fee, who themselves were heading for relegation at the end of the season. Newport's financial difficulties meant that Bath never received payment for Bodin's transfer.

=== Swindon Town and Crystal Palace ===
Bodin left Newport for Second Division side Swindon Town in March 1988 for a fee of £30,000 after Eastick was ordered to sell players in an attempt to raise funds. Newport were forced to fold less than a year later with debts of over £300,000. Signed by Swindon as cover for Phil King; he signed a three-year contract. Lou Macari took the "Robins" to the play-offs in the 1988–89 season, where they were beaten by Crystal Palace. When King left for Sheffield Wednesday in November the following year, Bodin became the club's first-choice left-back. He was almost ever-present under Osvaldo Ardiles in the 1989–90 campaign as Swindon reached the play-off final at Wembley, where they beat Sunderland 1–0. However, they were denied a place in the First Division due to a financial scandal after the club were found to have been making irregular payments to players, initially being demoted to the Second Division before being allowed to remain in the First Division on appeal. Bodin was sold to Steve Coppell's Crystal Palace for a £550,000 fee on 20 March 1991. He failed to break into the "Eagles" first-team as Palace reached third in the league in the 1990–91 campaign, though he was still named on the Second Division PFA Team of the Year for his time at Swindon. Ardiles took him back into the Second Division with Newcastle United for a short loan spell in December 1991.

=== Return to Swindon ===
Bodin returned to the County Ground just ten months after he had left - Glenn Hoddle paying a fee of £225,000 on 10 January 1992. Hoddle played Bodin as a more attack-minded wing-back, making better use of Bodin's crossing ability. He also installed Bodin as the club's penalty taker - moves which were to come to fruition the following season, when he scored a total of twelve goals from his new position. Five of these goals came from the penalty spot - the last of which gave Swindon the lead in the dying minutes of the 1993 play-off final win over Leicester City. He was named as the club's Player of the Season for 1992–93. He performed well in the Premier League, scoring seven league goals, including penalty strikes against Manchester United and Arsenal as Swindon were relegated at the end of the 1993–94 season. He remained as John Gorman's first-choice left-back for two more seasons, despite a second-successive relegation in 1994–95. He helped the club to the Second Division championship under Steve McMahon in 1995–96, ahead of initial first-choice left-back Jason Drysdale, before leaving the club at the end of that season despite being named on the PFA Team of the Year for the second time in his career.

=== Later career ===
He was signed by his former teammate Jimmy Quinn at Reading in July 1996. He made 36 appearances in the 1996–97 campaign despite being told he would only be used as emergency cover in case of injuries. He spent the first half of the 1997–98 season on loan at John Gregory's Second Division Wycombe Wanderers. He left Elm Park after Tommy Burns's "Royals" were relegated out of the First Division in 1998. He returned to Bath City to take a position as player-manager. He led the club to fourth-place finishes in the Southern League in 1998–99 and 1999–2000, and a 15th-place finish in 2000–01. In 2001, his position was dropped to part-time due to financial troubles at the club, and he subsequently resigned. In August 2002, he signed with Devizes Town of the Western League. He played for Swindon Supermarine later in the year.

== International career ==
During his time with Cardiff, Bodin won a single cap at under-21 level for Wales. He went on to win 23 caps for Wales under the management of Terry Yorath and Mike Smith, making his debut in a 1–0 win over Costa Rica. He missed a penalty when the score was 1–1 in Wales' final and decisive 1994 FIFA World Cup qualifier at home to Romania, a game Wales needed to win in order to qualify but they subsequently lost 2–1. Speaking in 2015, he said "I have had to live with that hurt and it never quite goes away".

== Coaching career ==
Bodin was appointed a coach in Swindon Town's youth team set-up in 2001. In April 2011 he took over as caretaker manager of Swindon for the final two games of the 2010–11 season after the departure of Paul Hart. Following the arrival of Paolo Di Canio, Bodin rebuffed advances from Torquay United to become assistant manager under good friend Martin Ling, and opted to sign a new long-term deal with Swindon Town following the revelations he had been working without a contract for three and a half years. He left the club in June 2013. He went on to work in Southampton's Academy.

In May 2015, Rob Page appointed Bodin as his assistant manager at Port Vale. He rejected the chance to follow Page to Northampton Town in May 2016, and resigned his post at Vale Park for personal reasons. In August 2019, Bodin was promoted from Wales under-19 coach to Wales under-21 team coach. In July 2022 Bodin's contract with Wales Under-21 was terminated by mutual consent.

== Personal life ==
His son, Billy Bodin, is also a professional footballer.

== Career statistics ==
=== Club ===
Appearances and goals by club, season and competition
Club	Season	League			FA Cup		Other (Note: Includes League Cup, Football League Trophy, Football League play-offs and Full Members Cup.)		Total	
Club	Season	Division	Apps	Goals	Apps	Goals	Apps	Goals	Apps	Goals
Chelsea	1981–82	Second Division	0	0	0	0	0	0	0	0
Newport County	1981–82	Third Division	0	0	0	0	0	0	0	0
Cardiff City	1982–83	Third Division	31	0	3	0	4	0	38	0
Cardiff City	1983–84	Second Division	26	3	1	0	4	0	31	3
Cardiff City	1984–85	Second Division	18	1	0	0	3	0	21	1
Cardiff City	Total		75	4	4	0	11	0	90	4
Newport County	1987–88	Fourth Division	6	1	0	0	0	0	6	1
Swindon Town	1987–88	Second Division	5	1	0	0	1	0	6	1
Swindon Town	1988–89	Second Division	16	1	2	0	0	0	18	1
Swindon Town	1989–90	Second Division	41	5	1	0	15	0	57	5
Swindon Town	1990–91	Second Division	31	2	3	0	5	0	39	2
Swindon Town	Total		93	9	6	0	21	0	120	9
Crystal Palace	1990–91	First Division	5	0	0	0	0	0	5	0
Crystal Palace	1991–92	First Division	4	0	0	0	1	0	5	0
Crystal Palace	Total		9	0	0	0	1	0	10	0
Newcastle United (loan)	1991–92	Second Division	6	0	0	0	0	0	6	0
Swindon Town	1991–92	Second Division	21	2	2	0	0	0	23	2
Swindon Town	1992–93	First Division	35	11	1	0	6	1	42	12
Swindon Town	1993–94	Premier League	32	7	2	0	3	0	37	7
Swindon Town	1994–95	First Division	25	6	1	0	8	0	34	6
Swindon Town	1995–96	Second Division	33	2	4	1	5	0	42	3
Swindon Town	Total		146	28	10	1	22	1	178	30
Reading	1996–97	First Division	37	1	0	0	2	0	39	1
Reading	1997–98	First Division	2	0	0	0	1	0	3	0
Reading	Total		39	1	0	0	3	0	42	1
Wycombe Wanderers (loan)	1997–98	Second Division	5	0	0	0	0	0	5	0
Career total			379	43	20	1	58	1	457	45

=== International ===
Appearances and goals by national team and year
National team	Year	Apps	Goals
Wales	1990	4	0
Wales	1991	8	3
Wales	1995	3	0
Wales	1993	5	0
Wales	1994	3	0
Total		23	3

== Honours ==
Cardiff City

- Football League Third Division second-place promotion: 1982–83

Swindon Town

- Football League Second Division play-offs: 1990
- Football League First Division play-offs: 1993
- Football League Second Division: 1995–96

Individual

- PFA Team of the Year: 1990–91 Second Division, 1995–96 Second Division
- Swindon Town Player of the Season: 1992–93
