= Ben Worrall =

English footballer

Personal information
- Full name: Benjamin Joseph Worrall
- Date of birth: 7 December 1975 (age 50)
- Place of birth: Swindon, England
- Height: 5 ft 3 in (1.60 m)
- Position: Central midfielder

Senior career*
Years	Team	Apps	(Gls)
1994–1996	Swindon Town	3	(0)
1996–1999	Scarborough	69	(3)
1999–2000	Exeter City	4	(0)
2000–2001	Stevenage Borough	1	(0)
Total		77	(3)
- * Club domestic league appearances and goals as of 09:55, 12 April 2011 (UTC)

Benjamin Joseph Worrall (born 7 December 1975), in Swindon, Wiltshire, England, was an English footballer who played as a central midfielder in the Football League.

== Career ==
Worrall came through the youth team at Swindon Town and made his professional debut for the Robins on 29 April 1995 against Portsmouth away at Fratton Park. He was brought into the first team by manager Steve McMahon for the final games of the 1995–96 campaign.
