= Craig Maskell =

English footballer (born 1968)

Personal information
- Full name: Craig Dell Maskell
- Date of birth: 10 April 1968 (age 58)
- Place of birth: Aldershot, England
- Height: 5 ft 9 in (1.75 m)
- Position: Centre forward

Senior career*
Years	Team	Apps	(Gls)
1986–1988	Southampton	6	(1)
1987	→ Swindon Town (loan)	0	(0)
1988–1990	Huddersfield Town	87	(43)
1990–1992	Reading	72	(26)
1992–1994	Swindon Town	47	(22)
1994–1996	Southampton	17	(1)
1995	→ Bristol City (loan)	5	(1)
1996–1997	Brighton & Hove Albion	64	(20)
1997–1998	Happy Valley		
1998–1999	Leyton Orient	31	(3)
1999–2002	Hampton & Richmond Borough	141	(66)
2002–2003	Aylesbury United	42	(20)
2003–2012	Staines Town		

Managerial career
- 2003–2012: Staines Town (joint)
- * Club domestic league appearances and goals

Craig Dell Maskell (born 10 April 1968) is an English football coach and former footballer.

As a player, he was a centre forward who notably played in the Premier League for Southampton. He also played in the Football League for Huddersfield Town, Reading, Swindon Town, Brighton & Hove Albion and Leyton Orient, later playing at non-league level for Happy Valley, Hampton & Richmond Borough and Aylesbury United. He would both play and manage Staines Town from 2003 until 2012.

== Playing career ==
Craig Maskell began his professional football career at Southampton where he'd previously signed as an apprentice. After playing a handful of games for the club, he was loaned to Swindon Town before his eventual transfer to Huddersfield Town.

A prolific goalscorer for the team, Maskell was later included in The Fans' Favourites and nominated by avid fan David Ward, a book which lists the 100 Huddersfield Town players voted by the fans as their favourite players at the time of their centennial in 2008.

A spell at Reading was followed by his move to Swindon Town, under Glenn Hoddle; he scored at Wembley in the 1993 Division One Play-off Final to promote Swindon to the Premier League.

Following a poor season with the club in 1993–94, when they were relegated from the Premier League with only five wins all season, he was sold back to Southampton for £250,000, but his return to The Dell was not a success. He managed 17 Premier League appearances in two seasons, scoring just once, and unable to break up the three-man attack of Matthew Le Tissier, Neil Shipperley and Gordon Watson. He also faced competition for a place on the bench from the likes of Ronnie Ekelund and Neil Heaney.

He then played for Bristol City, Brighton and Hong Kong teams Happy Valley AA before arriving at Leyton Orient. His role at Brighton was distinguished by a shot that curled around the keeper and hit the post for Robbie Reinelt to score the rebound goal against Hereford that kept the Albion in the Football League.

His 18 months at Orient ended when, as part of the losing team in the 1999 Division Three play-off final, he walked off the pitch at the end of the game vowing never to play for the team again. "I turned to one of my team-mates and said 'that's enough', I'd spent too much time away from my family and too little time on the pitch at Orient."

Leyton Orient released him at the start of the 1999–00 season and he became assistant coach under manager Steve Cordery at Hampton & Richmond Borough. Maskell was leading goalscorer for the team at the end of the 1999–00 season and had helped the Isthmian League Premier Division club to reach the first round of the FA Cup for the first time.

Maskell and Cordery moved to Aylesbury in Summer 2002 and he was again amongst the Premier Division's top marksmen with 26 league and cup goals for the team.

The pair took over at Staines Town in 2003, where they continued to play and manage the team until April 2012.

== Personal life ==
Maskell became a sports teacher at Southgate College during his time in non-league. He later returned to Hampshire to teach sports at Eastleigh College.

== Career statistics ==
Appearances and goals by club, season and competition
Club	Season	League			FA Cup		League Cup		Other		Total	
Club	Season	Division	Apps	Goals	Apps	Goals	Apps	Goals	Apps	Goals	Apps	Goals
Southampton
Southampton	1985–86	First Division	2	1	0	0	0	0	—		2	1
Southampton	1986–87	First Division	4	0	0	0	0	0	—		4	0
Southampton	1987–88	First Division	0	0	0	0	0	0	—		0	0
Southampton	Total		6	1	0	0	0	0	0	0	6	1
Swindon Town (loan)	1986–87	Third Division	0	0	0	0	0	0	—		0	0
Huddersfield Town
Huddersfield Town	1988–89	Third Division	46	28	4	1	2	2	4 (Note: Appearances in Associate Members' Cup)	2	56	33
Huddersfield Town	1989–90	Third Division	41	15	4	2	4	2	3	2	52	21
Huddersfield Town	Total		87	43	8	3	6	4	7	4	108	54
Reading
Reading	1990–91	Third Division	38	10	1	0	2	0	—		41	10
Reading	1991–92	Third Division	34	16	5	0	0	0	1	0	40	16
Reading	Total		72	26	6	0	2	0	1	0	81	26
Swindon Town
Swindon Town	1992–93	First Division	33	18	1	0	2	1	5 (Note: Appearances in Anglo-Italian Cup (2 appearances, 1 goal) and 1993 play-offs (3 appearances, 3 goals))	4	41	23
Swindon Town	1993–94	Premier League	14	3	2	0	2	0	—		18	3
Swindon Town	Total		47	21	3	0	4	1	5	4	59	26
Southampton
Southampton	1993–94	Premier League	10	1	—		—		—		10	1
Southampton	1994–95	Premier League	6	0	1	0	0	0	—		7	0
Southampton	1995–96	Premier League	1	0	1	0	0	0	—		2	0
Southampton	Total		17	1	2	0	0	0	0	0	19	1
Bristol City (loan)	1995–96	Second Division	5	1	0	0	0	0	—		5	1
Brighton & Hove Albion
Brighton & Hove Albion	1995–96	Second Division	15	4	0	0	0	0	—		15	4
Brighton & Hove Albion	1996–97	Third Division	37	14	2	1	2	0	2 (Note: Appearances in Football League Trophy)	1	43	16
Brighton & Hove Albion	1997–98	Third Division	17	2	1	0	2	1	—		20	3
Brighton & Hove Albion	Total		69	20	3	1	4	1	2	1	78	23
Leyton Orient
Leyton Orient	1997–98	Third Division	8	2	0	0	0	0	—		8	2
Leyton Orient	1998–99	Third Division	15	0	2	0	2	0	3 (Note: Appearances in Football League Trophy (1 appearance) and 1999 play-offs (2 appearances))	0	22	0
Leyton Orient	Total		23	2	2	0	2	0	3	0	30	2
Aylesbury United	2002–03	Isthmian League Premier	42	20	1	0	—		12 (Note: Appearances in FA Trophy (9 appearances, 2 goals), Berks & Bucks Senior Cup (2 appearances, 1 goal) and Bryco Cup (1 appearance, 1 goal))	4	55	24
Career total			368	135	25	4	18	6	30	13	441	158

== Honours ==
Swindon Town

- Football League First Division play-offs: 1993
