= Andy Thomson (English footballer) =

English footballer

Personal information
- Full name: Andrew Thomson
- Date of birth: 28 March 1974 (age 52)
- Place of birth: Swindon, England
- Height: 1.91 m (6 ft 3 in)
- Position: Defender

Senior career*
Years	Team	Apps	(Gls)
1993–1995	Swindon Town	22	(0)
1995–1999	Portsmouth	93	(3)
1999–2002	Bristol Rovers	127	(6)
2002–2004	Wycombe Wanderers	50	(2)
2004–?	Forest Green Rovers		
- * Club domestic league appearances and goals

Andy Thomson (born 28 March 1974) is an English former professional footballer who played as a defender for Swindon Town, Portsmouth, Bristol Rovers and Wycombe Wanderers.

Thomson's career began at his home town club, Swindon Town, as a trainee where he progressed to the first team and made 22 league appearances without scoring a goal. He moved to Portsmouth for a fee of £75,000 in 1995 and went on to make 93 appearances for Pompey, before the club's financial problems forced his sale to Bristol Rovers for a fee of £50,000 in 1999. During his time at Rovers, Thomson became the club captain and made 127 league appearances, scoring six goals in the process. He ended his league career at Wycombe Wanderers, where he spent two years and played 50 league games.
