= Marcus Phillips (footballer) =

English footballer (born 1973)

Personal information
- Full name: Marcus Stuart Phillips
- Date of birth: 17 October 1973 (age 53)
- Place of birth: Trowbridge, England
- Height: 5 ft 11 in (1.80 m)
- Position: Winger

Senior career*
Years	Team	Apps	(Gls)
1992–1995	Swindon Town	0	(0)
- Cheltenham Town
1995–1996	Gloucester City	15	(6)
1996	FC Utrecht	7	(0)
- Witney Town
1997	Oxford United	1	(0)
1997–1998	Sydney United	17	(2)
1998–1999	Marconi Stallions	22	(1)
1999–2000	Olympic Sharks	16	(0)
2000–2001	Canberra Cosmos	24	(0)
- Sengkang Marine
2002	Brunei		
2002–2003	Northern Spirit		
2003	Brunei		
2003–2004	Blacktown City	13	(3)
- Geylang United
- Albany United
2004	Auckland City		
- Waitakere United
- * Club domestic league appearances and goals

Marcus Stuart Phillips (born 17 October 1973) is an English retired professional footballer who played as a winger in England, the Netherlands, Australia, Singapore, Malaysia and New Zealand.

== Career ==
Born in Trowbridge, Phillips began his career with Swindon Town, making one League Cup appearance in the 1992–93 season. He then played for non-league clubs Cheltenham Town and Gloucester City. He also played for Dutch club FC Utrecht, signing for them in March 1996 until the end of the season, and making 7 appearances in the Eredivisie. He then returned to non-league Football with Witney Town. He signed for Oxford United in February 1997, making one appearance in the Football League.

He later played in Australia, Singapore, Malaysia and New Zealand for Sydney United, Marconi Stallions, Olympic Sharks, Canberra Cosmos, Sengkang Marine, Brunei, Northern Spirit, Blacktown City, Geylang United, Albany United, Auckland City and Waitakere United.
