= Luc Nijholt =

Dutch footballer and manager

Personal information
- Full name: Luc Nijholt
- Date of birth: 29 July 1961 (age 65)
- Place of birth: Zaandam, Netherlands
- Height: 5 ft 11 in (1.80 m)
- Positions: Midfielder; defender

Youth career
- ZVV

Senior career*
Years	Team	Apps	(Gls)
1981–1987	Haarlem	184	(9)
1987–1988	AZ	9	(0)
1988–1989	Utrecht	15	(0)
1989–1990	Old Boys	27	(4)
1990–1993	Motherwell	96	(5)
1993–1995	Swindon Town	67	(1)
1995–1998	Volendam	60	(1)
Total		458	(20)

Managerial career
- Hellas Sport
- Zaanlandia
- ?–2005: AZ (U19)
- 2005–2008: Stormvogels Telstar
- 2008–2009: Red Bull Salzburg (assistant)
- 2010: Qatar (assistant)
- 2012: Shandong Luneng (assistant)
- 2014-2015: Dinamo Tbilisi (Academy Dir.)
- 2016: Meizhou Hakka
- 2018: Utrecht (assistant)
- 2019: Al Wahda (assistant)
- * Club domestic league appearances and goals

Luc Nijholt (born 29 July 1961) is a Dutch football manager and a former player, who played for a number of clubs, both home and abroad.

== Playing career ==
Nijholt began his career in the early 1980s with Haarlem, spending six years with the club. Nijholt was a member of the famous Haarlem team that competed in the UEFA Cup in the 1982–83 season, for the first time in the club's history. However this campaign was to be overshadowed by the Luzhniki disaster. He then moved on to single seasons with AZ, Utrecht and Swiss side Old Boys. In 1990, Nijholt moved to Scottish side Motherwell for a fee of £100,000 and helped them win the Scottish Cup in his first season.

In summer 1993, he moved to English side Swindon Town for a fee of £175,000, spending two years with The Robins. He joined them after they won promotion to the FA Premier League, but couldn't prevent them from being relegated after just one season with a mere five wins and a defence that leaked 100 goals in the league. However, he did score his only goal for Swindon on 19 March 1994 in a surprise 2–2 home draw against that season's double winners Manchester United. A year later he was part of the side which reached the Football League Cup semi finals but suffered a second successive relegation.

After leaving Swindon in 1995, Nijholt joined Volendam and spent three years with them before retiring in 1998.

== Managerial career ==
Nijholt became manager of Stormvogels Telstar in 2005 and has since declared his interest in managing former clubs Swindon and Motherwell, although neither application was successful.

He was the assistant coach of FC Red Bull Salzburg (Austria) during 2008–09 season. In 2010, he reunited with Co Adriaanse to be part of his coaching staff with the Qatar national team. He later worked as an assistant to Jean-Paul de Jong at FC Utrecht and to Maurice Steijn in Qatar. He also was academy manager at Dinamo Tbilisi.

== Personal life ==
In 1984 his then 21-year-old girlfriend Sandra van Raalten was murdered in the fashion store where she worked. The case is known as De Paskamermoord, which translates to English as 'the fitting room murder'.

His son Gianluca Nijholt was also a professional footballer.

== Honours ==
- Scottish Cup: 1990–91
