= Chris Hamon =

Jersey footballer (born 1970)

Personal information
- Full name: Christopher Anthony Hamon
- Date of birth: 27 April 1970 (age 56)
- Place of birth: Jersey
- Position: Forward

Senior career*
Years	Team	Apps	(Gls)
- St. Peter's
1992–1996	Swindon Town	8	(1)
- Cheltenham Town (loan)
1998–1999	St. Peter's		
- Dundalk
- St. Peter's

International career
- Jersey
- * Club domestic league appearances and goals

Chris Hamon (born 27 April 1970) is a retired footballer from Jersey who played as a forward for Swindon Town, Cheltenham Town and Dundalk. He also represented the Jersey national team in the 1991 Island Games, scoring four goals (including a hat-trick against Greenland). After retiring from football, Hamon worked as a paramedic.
