= Austin Berkley =

English footballer (born 1973)

Personal information
- Full name: Austin James Berkley
- Date of birth: 28 January 1973 (age 53)
- Place of birth: Dartford, Kent, England
- Position: Winger

Youth career
- Gillingham

Senior career*
Years	Team	Apps	(Gls)
1991–1992	Gillingham	3	(0)
1992–1995	Swindon Town	1	(0)
1995–2000	Shrewsbury Town	174	(12)
2000–2002	Barnet	13	(2)
2001	→ Carlisle United (loan)	5	(0)
2002	Gravesend & Northfleet		(0)
2002–2003	Chelmsford City	34	(5)
- Gravesend & Northfleet
- Welling United
- Heybridge Swifts
- Harlow Town
- Croydon Athletic
- Erith Town
- * Club domestic league appearances and goals

Austin James Berkley (born 28 January 1973) is an English former professional footballer who played as a winger. His most successful spell was at Shrewsbury Town, where he made 174 appearances in five years, scoring 12 goals.

== Career ==
Berkley began his career at Gillingham, making three appearances in the Football League after graduating from the youth system at the club. In May 1992, Berkley signed for Swindon Town. At Swindon, Berkley made a single league appearance, before departing to join Shrewsbury Town in July 1995. During five seasons at Shrewsbury, Berkley made 172 league appearances, scoring 12 times. Four years after leaving the club, Berkley placed third on a list of Shrewsbury in a poll conducted by BBC Sport. In July 2000, Berkley joined Barnet, being loaned to Carlisle United in August 2001. Following his spell at Barnet, Berkley dropped into Non-League football, playing for Gravesend & Northfleet, Chelmsford City, Welling United, Heybridge Swifts, Harlow Town and Croydon Athletic, before finishing his career in South London at Erith Town.

== Honours ==
Shrewsbury Town

- Football League Trophy runner-up: 1995–96
