= Nicky Summerbee =

English footballer, sports television pundit, and commentator

Personal information
- Full name: Nicholas Summerbee
- Date of birth: 26 August 1971 (age 55)
- Place of birth: Altrincham, England
- Height: 5 ft 11 in (1.80 m)
- Position: Midfielder

Youth career
- 1989–1994: Swindon Town

Senior career*
Years	Team	Apps	(Gls)
1989–1994	Swindon Town	112	(6)
1994–1997	Manchester City	131	(6)
1997–2001	Sunderland	94	(7)
2001	Bolton Wanderers	9	(1)
2001	Manchester City	0	(0)
2001–2002	Nottingham Forest	17	(2)
2002–2003	Leicester City	29	(0)
2003–2006	Bradford City	68	(4)
2005	→ Swindon Town (loan)	1	(0)
2005	→ Tranmere Rovers (loan)	6	(0)
2006	Tamworth	4	(0)
Total		471	(26)

International career
1993	England U21	3	(1)
1994	England B	1	(0)
- * Club domestic league appearances and goals

Nicholas Summerbee (born 26 August 1971) is an English former professional footballer, sports television pundit and commentator.

He notably played in the Premier League for Swindon Town, Manchester City and Sunderland, as well as in the Football League for Bolton Wanderers, Nottingham Forest, Leicester City, Bradford City and Tranmere Rovers before finishing his career with Non-league Tamworth. He was capped by both the England U21 and England B sides.

== Club career ==
=== Swindon Town ===
Born in Altrincham, he had trials at Manchester United, Leicester City, and Norwich City, before joining Swindon Town; where his father, former England international Mike Summerbee, had connections. Summerbee played 112 games in seven years for the Robins, scoring six goals and helping them get promoted to the Premier League in 1993 before Manchester City paid £1.3million for his services a year later.

=== Manchester City ===
Summerbee joined Manchester City in 1994. His father Mike had become a household name at the club being part of the successful City team of the late 1960s and early 1970s and also being part of the star trio of Mike Summerbee, Francis Lee and Colin Bell. Summerbee joined the team at a time when manager Brian Horton also brought in Peter Beagrie, Uwe Rosler and Paul Walsh.

In his first season Manchester City finished towards the bottom end of the Premiership table. Then chairman Francis Lee replaced manager Brian Horton with Alan Ball who failed to manage the team to increased success. The team were relegated to the first division. In the summer of 1997 he was offered a trial by the French club Bordeaux. In November 1997, Summerbee joined Sunderland in a £1million-rated swap deal involving Craig Russell.

=== Sunderland ===
Summerbee made his Sunderland debut on 15 November 1997, against Portsmouth at Fratton Park, as a second-half substitute for Martin Smith. With trademark un-tucked shirt and orange edged boots, Summerbee capped his debut by notching the final goal in a 4–1 victory, scoring with a satisfying low drive. He played out the rest of the season on the right hand side of midfield and enjoyed some of the finest moments of his career after Sunderland won promotion to the Premiership in 1999.

During that season, an injured Summerbee enjoyed a well-publicised liaison with TV presenter, Melanie Sykes. However, it came at a cost. He lost his place in the team following his capital night out with Mel and a 4–1 defeat at Arsenal. Whilst he returned after one match, Summerbee was substituted in both of his next two games and was relegated to the bench for the next four. He returned triumphantly to the starting eleven by scoring his first goal of the season against Everton. It turned out to be his last as a Sunderland player. After this goal, Summerbee was in and out of the side. He finished the season on a high note though, starting in – and starring in – the final three games.

Summerbee was left in the wilderness by boss Peter Reid the following season. He sat on the sidelines for six months until he was given a game for the reserves against Newcastle United. He was clearly unfit and unhappy, he lashed out at Newcastle United defender Andy Griffin and was immediately substituted before he could be sent off.

=== Later career ===
Free transfers and quick stays at the likes of Bolton Wanderers (where he scored once against Crystal Palace), Leicester City and Nottingham Forest were followed by a two-and-a-half-year stay at Bradford City, which included loan spells at Swindon Town and Tranmere Rovers. In 2001 he even signed a rolling contract back at Manchester City but never added to his 94 City appearances under Kevin Keegan.

Summerbee latterly played for Conference National side Tamworth, but was released at the end of the 2005–06 season.

== International career ==
On 10 May 1994, Summerbee won an England 'B' cap in a match against Northern Ireland 'B' at Hillsborough.

== Personal life ==
He is the son of Manchester City cult hero Mike Summerbee. His grandfather, George Summerbee, and great uncle, Gordon Summerbee, had also been professional footballers. Nick is married and has three children.

== Media career ==
Since retirement Summerbee has worked as a Radio co-commentator for BBC Radio Five, as well as being a local pundit for Manchester City games.

As of September 20, 2020 Summerbee is a pundit for beIN Sports.

== Honours ==
Swindon Town

- Football League First Division play-offs: 1993

Sunderland

- Football League First Division: 1998–99

Individual

- Sunderland Solid Gold XI
