= Steve White (footballer) =

English footballer & manager (born 1959)

Personal information
- Full name: Stephen James White
- Date of birth: 2 January 1959 (age 67)
- Place of birth: Chipping Sodbury, England
- Height: 5 ft 11 in (1.80 m)
- Position: Forward

Senior career*
Years	Team	Apps	(Gls)
1976–1977	Mangotsfield United	?	(?)
1977–1979	Bristol Rovers	46	(20)
1979–1982	Luton Town	63	(25)
1982–1983	Charlton Athletic	29	(12)
1983	→ Lincoln City (loan)	2	(0)
1983	→ Luton Town (loan)	4	(0)
1983–1986	Bristol Rovers	89	(24)
1986–1994	Swindon Town	200	(83)
1994–1996	Hereford United	76	(44)
1996–1998	Cardiff City	45	(17)
1998	→ Cwmbran Town (loan)	6	(4)
1998–2001	Bath City		

Managerial career
- 2003–2005: Chippenham Town
- * Club domestic league appearances and goals

Steve White (born 2 January 1959) is a retired professional football player and manager. A forward, his career spanned over 500 appearances for nine league clubs, including Bristol Rovers, Luton Town, Swindon Town and Cardiff City.

== Playing career ==
White was born in Chipping Sodbury.

He helped Swindon in several promotion campaigns and played a crucial role in the 1993 play-off victory over Leicester City at Wembley Stadium when he came off the bench to win a penalty. White is still held in great affection at the County Ground. His time at the club was notable for frequently straying offside, pulling his shorts up high and invariably scoring many goals. He was a very awkward player to play against for opposition centre halves. The esteem for White was demonstrated when he returned to Swindon with Hereford for a cup tie. His goal for the visitors was cheered equally heartily by home fans as away. White came second in the BBC Football Focus Swindon Cult Heroes poll behind Don Rogers Swindon Town's cult heroes

In August 1994 he signed for Hereford United and quickly became a fan favourite ("Chalky" White) at Edgar Street by scoring 44 goals in 76 league appearances. 1995–96 was arguably his best playing season when his prolific strike rate propelled Hereford from 19th to 6th in two months. His 29 league goals made him top goalscorer in the top four English divisions. After failing to gain promotion via the play-offs, he left Hereford and signed for Cardiff City. Whilst at Cardiff he played six games on Loan at Cwmbran Town scoring four goals in the time he was there.

He was initially in the frame for Bath City's managerial post but instead joined as player-assistant to Paul Bodin in June 1998. He scored 12 times in his first season at Twerton Park showing even at 40 years of age he had lost little of his skill in front of goal. White reduced his appearances during the next two years to an occasional outing and left the club in February 2001 in an attempt to return to the professional game in a coaching capacity.

== Managerial career ==
White became director of football at Southampton's academy, and became manager of Chippenham Town in November 2003. He resigned in June 2005 after applying for the vacant managerial post at Bath City.

== Honours ==
Swindon Town

- Football League First Division play-offs: 1993
- Football League Third Division play-offs: 1987
