= Micky Hazard =

English footballer

Personal information
- Full name: Michael Hazard
- Date of birth: 5 February 1960 (age 66)
- Place of birth: Sunderland, England
- Height: 5 ft 7 in (1.70 m)
- Position: Central midfielder

Youth career
- 1976–1978: Tottenham Hotspur

Senior career*
Years	Team	Apps	(Gls)
1978–1985	Tottenham Hotspur	91	(13)
1985–1990	Chelsea	81	(9)
1990	Portsmouth	8	(1)
1990–1993	Swindon Town	121	(17)
1993–1995	Tottenham Hotspur	28	(2)
Total		329	(42)

Managerial career
- 2014–2017: Hadley
- * Club domestic league appearances and goals

Michael Hazard (born 5 February 1960) is an English football coach and former professional footballer.

He played as a central midfielder notably in the top flight for Tottenham Hotspur and Chelsea. He also played in the Football League for Portsmouth, and Swindon Town. His second spell with Spurs brought numerous appearances in the Premier League.

Following retirement, he had a brief spell at Crystal Palace and later had a three-year spell as manager of non-league side Hadley.

== Playing career ==
Growing up in Sunderland, Hazard began playing football with his friends and later joining his local school team. During one of these matches, he was spotted by a scout from London-based club Tottenham Hotspur but was too young to be offered a trial.

He was initially invited to train with Spurs when aged 14 and continued to have week-long sessions with the club until, aged 16, he moved to London to join the youth squad as an apprentice. Prone to bouts of homesickness, Hazard ran home six times during the next two years until finally settling at the club.

Hazard signed a professional contract with Spurs and made his League debut in a 3–0 victory versus Everton on 19 April 1980 aged 20. He was a member of the Tottenham side that won the 1982 FA Cup and UEFA Cup in 1984, where his crosses led to goals in both legs of the final against Anderlecht.

Hazard was transferred to Chelsea in September 1985 for £300,000 and would remain at the club for the next five years, one of the team that won the 1986 Full Members Cup Final. He moved to Portsmouth in January 1990 before signing for Swindon Town in September 1990 for £130,000.

Hazard became an influential player in Swindon's play-off winning season of 1992–93 under Glenn Hoddle which saw them promoted to the Premier League. He was sold back to Tottenham in November 1993 for £50,000, where he would stay until his retirement on 23 April 1995.

== Coaching career ==
Hazard has worked as a youth academy coach at Crystal Palace.

He has said of his role at Crystal Palace – "I got my trophies and a whole sackful of terrific memories and now I've moved on helping the kids, and I love it. Playing was great but I still get the biggest buzz from seeing my lads do the best they can."

In July 2011 it was announced that Micky would be assisting Chigwell Athletic in an advisory role alongside director of football Ben Richman. In the summer of 2014, he became Manager of South Midlands League side Hadley. He left the club in October 2017.

== Personal life ==
He played in the Celebrity Soccer Six charity tournament in 2001 as a member of Damon Albarn's team and was eliminated in the Quarter-finals by Rod Stewart's "Vagabonds".

It was reported in 2006 that he was a taxi driver.

In July 2009, Hazard signed for Sevenoaks and District Football League team Dunton Green, adding "You never lose that buzz to want to play the game of football."

He is not related to Eden Hazard, who also played for Chelsea.

== Honours ==
Tottenham Hotspur

- FA Cup: 1981–82
- UEFA Cup: 1983–84
- Football League Cup runner-up: 1981–82

Chelsea

- Football League Second Division: 1988–89
- Full Members' Cup: 1985–86

Swindon Town

- Football League First Division play-offs: 1993

Individual

- PFA Team of the Year: 1991–92 Second Division, 1992–93 First Division
