= Ross MacLaren =

Scottish footballer (born 1962)

Personal information
- Date of birth: 14 April 1962 (age 64)
- Place of birth: Edinburgh, Scotland
- Height: 5 ft 10 in (1.78 m)
- Position: Defensive midfielder

Youth career
- Rangers

Senior career*
Years	Team	Apps	(Gls)
1980–1985	Shrewsbury Town	161	(18)
1985–1988	Derby County	122	(4)
1988–1994	Swindon Town	205	(9)

Managerial career
- 1994–1998: Swindon Town reserves
- 1998–2002: Aston Villa (chief scout)
- 2002–2003: Derby County (assistant manager)
- 2004–2005: Southend United youth
- 2005–2006: Notts County (assistant manager)
- * Club domestic league appearances and goals

Ross MacLaren, sometimes erroneously spelled McLaren, (born 14 April 1962) is a Scottish football coach and former professional player who played as a defensive midfielder.

== Playing career ==
MacLaren was born in Edinburgh. His league career in England began with Shrewsbury Town, having joined them from Rangers. He joined the club in 1980 and was there for four seasons playing 161 games and scoring 18 times. It was at Shrewsbury that he first moved from the role of a midfielder to that of a defender.

He moved to Derby County in 1985 for a fee of £67,00 and was voted Rams player of the year in his first season, 1985–86, in which Derby were promoted to Division Two. An ever present player in the team in his first two seasons, MacLaren was a key figure in Derby's second successive promotion; winning the Second Division Championship in his second season at the Baseball Ground.

In August 1988, he was bought by Swindon Town manager Lou Macari for £165,000, having previously being valued at £450,000.

Playing as a defensive midfield player, MacLaren was known for accurate long passes and his powerful shooting from outside the area; Swindon scored many goals from rebounds after the opposing goalkeeper was unable to hold one of MacLaren's shots. He was also handed the responsibility of being the club's penalty taker.

Under Ossie Ardiles the following season, MacLaren was ever-present as the defensive player in Ossie's diamond-shaped midfield. The season ended with a Wembley appearance, as the club were promoted to Division One after the 1–0 win over Sunderland, only to be demoted by the League ten days later.

MacLaren missed just one game in 1990–91 and played the first 32 league matches the following year until a hernia problem brought an end to his season. The injury and related operations kept him out of the side for almost a year, returning to action at the end of January 1993. Though MacLaren seemed to have piled on the pounds, seven wins out of the next ten games helped Swindon secure a play-off place. This resulted in MacLaren's second successful visit to Wembley with the club, as they beat Leicester City 4–3 and were promoted into the FA Premier League.

After five years loyal service, he was also handed the captaincy for the Premier League season by new manager John Gorman. Though he was never a quick player, the extra weight that MacLaren was carrying seemed to slow him even more. He made just twelve appearances that season, with the club winning none of the matches he played in.

A recurrence of his hernia problem kept him out of the side again for a period, and the 1994–95 season proved to be his last, a comeback lasting just three games – his last game for Swindon coming on 26 November 1994, in a 2–1 defeat at Luton Town.

In his career with just three clubs Maclaren played 480 times, 466 of them from the start, and scored 31 goals.

== Coaching career ==
After retiring, MacLaren moved behind the scenes at Swindon and became the club's reserve team coach. He was sacked in a cost-cutting move in 1998 - seven other members of staff were also made redundant in a move that brought about Steve McMahon's resignation.

MacLaren then became the chief scout at Aston Villa, working under John Gregory for the first time. Due to the managerial shake-up at Aston Villa in February 2002, he left Villa Park with Gregory to become a coach at Derby County. Suspended by Derby for six-weeks on 21 March 2003, MacLaren left the club by mutual consent on 10 May 2003.

He took over the management of Southend's under-18 team before returning to League football as assistant manager of League Two club Notts County. He left the club at the end of the 2005–06 season when his contract was not renewed.

== Personal life ==
MacLaren's brother Donald had a short career as a footballer with Dunfermline Athletic (after failing to break through at Heart of Midlothian) prior to emigrating to Australia. His nephew Jamie Maclaren, Donald's son, is also a footballer who has played in Scotland, England and Germany and for the Australian national team.

== Honours ==
Swindon Town

- Football League First Division play-offs: 1993
