= John Gorman (footballer) =

Scottish football player and manager (born 1949)

Personal information
- Full name: John Gorman
- Date of birth: 16 August 1949 (age 77)
- Place of birth: Winchburgh, Scotland
- Height: 5 ft 8 in (1.73 m)
- Position: Defender

Youth career
- Winchburgh Albion
- Celtic

Senior career*
Years	Team	Apps	(Gls)
1968–1970	Celtic	0	(0)
1970–1976	Carlisle United	229	(5)
1976–1979	Tottenham Hotspur	30	(0)
1979–1982	Tampa Bay Rowdies	111	(1)
1979–1981	Tampa Bay Rowdies (indoor)		
1982–1983	Phoenix Inferno (indoor)		
1983–1984	Phoenix Pride (indoor)		
1986	Gillingham^{[a]}	0	(0)
Total		370	(6)

Managerial career
- 1993–1994: Swindon Town
- 1999: West Bromwich Albion (caretaker)
- 2003: Wycombe Wanderers (caretaker)
- 2004: Gillingham (caretaker)
- 2004–2006: Wycombe Wanderers
- 2006: Northampton Town
- 2008: Southampton (caretaker)
- * Club domestic league appearances and goals

John Gorman (born 16 August 1949) is a Scottish former football player and coach.

== Playing career ==
Gorman began his career at Celtic, but only played one game, a Scottish League Cup match in 1968. He was released and signed for Carlisle United and was almost ever present in their one season in the old First Division. He signed for Tottenham Hotspur in 1976 before injury as a result of a tackle by Jimmy Case lost him his place. The injury caused him to miss the final part of Spurs' unsuccessful relegation fight in 1977, and all of their promotion season of 1977–78.

In 1979, he moved to the United States where he signed with the Tampa Bay Rowdies of the NASL. He remained with Tampa Bay for four seasons and was a 1979 Second Team, 1980 Honorable Mention and 1981 First Team All Star. In the fall of 1982, he moved to the Phoenix Inferno of the Major Indoor Soccer League. He played two seasons with Phoenix, the second after the team became known as the Phoenix Pride.

== Coaching and management career ==
=== Swindon Town ===
Gorman's coaching career has often been intertwined with his longtime friend Glenn Hoddle, starting when Gorman became Hoddle's assistant at Swindon Town in 1991. With Hoddle as player-manager and featuring in most of the club's games, Gorman received plenty of the credit for this turnaround. So much so, that when Glenn Hoddle left to take over at Chelsea in 1993 he offered Gorman the chance to join him. His mind was made up when Town chairman Ray Hardman offered him the vacant manager's position; he accepted (a popular decision at the time) and looked forward to the forthcoming season in the Premier League, to which Swindon had just won promotion.

However, it was not a successful first season in the top flight for the Wiltshire club, who did not win a league game until their 16th match and ended the season relegated in bottom place with just five wins and having conceded 100 goals from 42 matches. A promising start to the following season suggested that a quick return to the Premier League was possible, but a downturn in form dragged Swindon into the bottom half of the table and Gorman was sacked in November 1994.

=== England ===
Despite being Scottish, he later rejoined Hoddle as assistant manager of the England team in 1996. After Hoddle's dismissal in 1999, Gorman became assistant manager at Reading.

=== Tottenham Hotspur ===
When Glenn Hoddle became manager of Tottenham Hotspur in March 2001, he became Hoddle's assistant at the North London club.

=== Wycombe and Gillingham ===
After leaving Tottenham in 2003 he was appointed caretaker manager at Wycombe but was passed over in favour of Tony Adams. He was taken on as an assistant to Andy Hessenthaler at Gillingham, and acted as caretaker manager after Hessenthaler stepped down before returning to Wycombe as manager after Adams' resignation in late 2004.

=== Wycombe Wanderers ===
After turning around Wycombe's poor form, the club finished the 2004–05 season strongly and only just missed out on a play-off place. At the start of the 2005–06 season, a new club record was set by going 21 consecutive league games unbeaten. Towards the end of the season it was announced that Gorman would be taking a temporary leave of absence for personal reasons, his wife Myra having died from cancer a few weeks earlier. However it was announced on 26 May that the club and manager had parted company permanently.

=== Northampton Town ===
On 5 June 2006 Gorman was announced as the new manager of Northampton Town replacing Colin Calderwood. Calderwood was given the Nottingham Forest position after Northampton finished 2nd in League Two and were promoted. On 20 December, Gorman resigned citing personal reasons. He later attributed his departure to stress. He had been in charge for 22 league games, which saw five wins, with just one at home all season.

=== Southampton ===
In May 2007 he became the chief scout at Southampton. Following George Burley's departure to become Scotland manager in January 2008, he was appointed joint caretaker manager, along with Jason Dodd. After a stint as caretaker manager, John Gorman was relieved of his duties after Nigel Pearson was placed in charge of the club on 19 February 2008. Gorman and Dodd both left the club in June 2008, following the appointment of new manager Jan Poortvliet.

=== Ipswich Town ===
On 30 December 2008, Gorman was appointed Assistant Manager of Ipswich Town, having previously been with the club 10 years prior in the same role. Gorman was released in April 2009 when Jim Magilton was sacked as manager.

=== Queens Park Rangers ===
On 8 June 2009, Gorman was appointed assistant manager of Queens Park Rangers, and thus reunited with his old friend, manager Jim Magilton but left by mutual consent in December 2009 along with Magilton.

=== Milton Keynes Dons ===
On 10 May 2010, Gorman was appointed assistant manager of Milton Keynes Dons, under new manager Karl Robinson. On 2 May 2012, Gorman announced that he was to retire from football at the end of the season after the Dons conclude their League One play-off campaign.

== Personal life ==
Gorman published his autobiography, Gory Tales: The Autobiography of John Gorman in 2008, as "Gory" was the nickname given him during his playing days. The book chronicled not only his long playing and managerial careers, but also how he dealt with the February 2006 death of his wife, Myra at age 56, after her year-long battle with cancer. The couple had been together since they were teenagers. Together they raised two children, a daughter Amanda and a son Nick.

During his time recovering from injury at Tottenham Hotspur he practised his hobby as a cartoonist, frequently having his work shown in the club's match-day programmes.

== Honours ==
Individual

- League Two Manager of the Month: September 2005

== Notes and references ==
Footnotes

a. Gorman was employed as youth team coach at Gillingham in 1986, but played in two League Cup matches.
