= Colin Calderwood =

Scottish association football player and manager

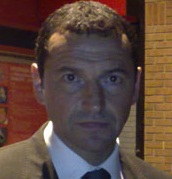
- Calderwood in 2007

Personal information
- Full name: Colin Calderwood
- Date of birth: 20 January 1965 (age 61)
- Place of birth: Stranraer, Scotland
- Height: 6 ft 0 in (1.83 m)
- Position: Centre-back

Senior career*
Years	Team	Apps	(Gls)
1982–1985	Mansfield Town	100	(1)
1985–1993	Swindon Town	330	(20)
1993–1999	Tottenham Hotspur	163	(6)
1999–2000	Aston Villa	26	(0)
2000–2001	Nottingham Forest	8	(0)
2001	→ Notts County (loan)	5	(0)
Total		632	(27)

International career
1995–1999	Scotland	36	(1)

Managerial career
- 2003–2006: Northampton Town
- 2006–2008: Nottingham Forest
- 2010–2011: Hibernian
- 2018–2020: Cambridge United
- 2026: Northampton Town (interim)
- * Club domestic league appearances and goals

Colin Calderwood (born 20 January 1965) is a Scottish professional football manager and former player who was most recently the interim head coach of Northampton Town.

As a player, he was a centre-back who played in the Premier League for Tottenham Hotspur and Aston Villa and in the Football League for Mansfield Town, Swindon Town, Nottingham Forest and Notts County. He was capped 36 times for Scotland and was part of their Euro 96 and World Cup 98 squads.

Following retirement, he became manager of Northampton Town in 2003, guiding the club to promotion in 2006. He then became manager of Nottingham Forest helping the club win promotion in 2008. Calderwood was sacked by Forest in December 2008 and then moved to Newcastle United, working as first team coach. After a year with the Tyneside club, Calderwood became a manager again by moving to Hibernian, but he was sacked after just over a year in that job. He was associated with Chris Hughton for several years, working as his assistant manager at Newcastle United, Birmingham City, Norwich City and Brighton & Hove Albion. After a spell as assistant manager at Aston Villa, he returned to full-time management and had two years in charge of Cambridge United.

== Club career ==
=== Mansfield Town ===
Despite being born and raised in the Stranraer area, Calderwood never played in the Scottish leagues. He started his career in the lower reaches of The Football League in England, with Mansfield Town. He played 100 league games for the club, three as substitute. His debut for Mansfield was spoiled by the club making an error in his registration which caused them to be deducted two league points.

=== Swindon Town ===
Swindon Town manager Lou Macari signed Calderwood from Mansfield Town in 1985, with a Football League tribunal setting the fee at £27,500.

The 21-year-old Calderwood was installed as the club captain, and he made his debut on the first day of the season, a 1–0 defeat at Wrexham on 17 August 1985. Although that season started badly, it ended with the Town breaking the League points record as they won the Fourth Division title. Calderwood's performance in Swindon Town's defence won him the Adver Player of the Year award from the Swindon Advertiser.

The following season, Calderwood helped Swindon Town to their achieve their second successive promotion, after beating Gillingham in the playoff final replay at Selhurst Park.

As Swindon gradually improved in Division Two, Calderwood led the defence, missing only thirteen league games over the next three years. At the end of this period, he led the Town to their first promotion to the top flight, after beating Sunderland in the playoff final at Wembley in 1990. Shortly afterwards, Swindon were demoted to the Third Division due to an irregular payments scandal. The club were reinstated to the Second Division after an appeal. Calderwood was arrested and questioned by the police with regard to the scandal, though was not ultimately charged with anything.

Swindon narrowly avoided relegation in the 1990–91 season, which Calderwood mostly missed after a tackle by Wolves player Steve Bull caused a serious injury. During the following two seasons, Calderwood returned to be an ever-present in the Swindon side. Now under the management of Glenn Hoddle, Swindon were promoted to the newly founded Premier League at the end of the 1992–93 season after a 4-3 playoff final victory over Leicester. Calderwood was picked for the Football League representative side, playing against their Italian counterparts.

=== Tottenham Hotspur ===
Calderwood's contract with Swindon expired in the summer of 1993. Former manager Ossie Ardiles signed him for Tottenham Hotspur, with a tribunal setting the transfer fee at £1.25 million. This set a new Swindon Town club record for transfer fee received.

Whilst at Tottenham Hotspur for five years Calderwood played with a succession of defenders including Gary Mabbutt and Ramon Vega. While at Tottenham he gained many of his Scotland caps, making his debut against Russia in the UEFA Euro 1996 qualifying Group 8 section. Calderwood represented his country at UEFA Euro 1996 and the 1998 FIFA World Cup, playing in all three matches at the first tournament and two matches at the second. He was a regular under Scotland manager Craig Brown.

Despite not being part of Tottenham's squad for the 1999 Football League Cup Final he made four appearances during their victorious League Cup campaign. Two days after the final Calderwood moved on from Tottenham in March 1999, signing for Aston Villa. He then had brief spells with Nottingham Forest and Notts County before retiring. Calderwood's career was brought to an end by a broken leg suffered while with Nottingham Forest.

== Coaching career ==
=== Northampton Town ===
Upon retirement as a player, Calderwood became reserve team manager at Tottenham. He became manager of Northampton Town on 9 October 2003. In his first two seasons in charge, Northampton reached the promotion playoffs. They finally won promotion in 2006 by finishing second in League Two, setting a new club record for clean sheets in a single season, with 25.

=== Nottingham Forest ===
Calderwood was appointed as manager by Nottingham Forest in May 2006. Calderwood enjoyed an unbeaten league start to his Forest campaign and won the managerial monthly award for August 2006. Forest led League One by seven points in late November 2006. This lead was squandered, and the club finished in fourth place, 11 points behind leaders Scunthorpe United. Forest lost 5–4 on aggregate to Yeovil Town in the promotion playoffs.

In the 2007–08 season, Forest failed to win any of their first six competitive games of the season. Forest went on a good run of form after this, losing just once in fifteen games. Calderwood won a manager of the month award during this run, but he decided to sell the award trophy on eBay to raise funds for presents to hospital patients in Nottingham. The auction was said to have raised around £2,000.

After this, there was a spell of inconsistent results, particularly away from home, which led to Forest dropping into the promotion play-off zone. Forest were nine points short of the automatic promotion places with just four games remaining, which led Calderwood to admit that automatic promotion was unlikely. Forest won six out of their last seven games, which was enough to earn a second-place finish and automatic promotion to the Football League Championship.

Calderwood was sacked by Forest in December 2008, as the club had secured just four wins by Christmas.

=== Newcastle United ===
Calderwood was appointed first team coach at Newcastle United on 26 January 2009. Newcastle were relegated from the Premier League at the end of the season. Calderwood then worked as an assistant manager to Chris Hughton as Newcastle gained promotion back to the Premier League at the first attempt by winning the 2009–10 Football League Championship.

=== Hibernian ===
On 18 October 2010, Calderwood left Newcastle to become manager of Edinburgh side Hibernian. After three losses in his first three matches in charge, including an Edinburgh derby defeat by rivals Hearts, Calderwood's first win as Hibs boss came in a shock 3–0 win against Rangers at Ibrox. Despite this surprise victory, Calderwood suffered criticism after Hibs went on a poor run of results, winning just two of his first fourteen matches as manager. This prompted speculation that he had offered to resign, which was denied. A five match winning run lifted Hibs up into eighth place in the SPL and earned Calderwood the SPL monthly award for February 2011. Hibs finished the 2010–11 season in tenth place.

In June 2011, Birmingham City and Nottingham Forest both approached Hibs with a view to appointing Calderwood as their assistant manager. Calderwood was sacked by Hibs on 6 November 2011, having won just 12 games out of 49.

=== Birmingham City ===
Calderwood was appointed assistant manager at Championship club Birmingham City on 24 November 2011, working with Chris Hughton for a third time. When Hughton left for Premier League club Norwich City on 7 June 2012, Calderwood went with him as assistant manager. He left the club when Hughton was dismissed on 6 April 2014.

=== Brighton and Hove Albion ===
In early February 2015, he was appointed assistant manager at Brighton & Hove Albion, rejoining Hughton for a fourth time. He resigned from the club on 12 November 2016 to take up a position elsewhere.

=== Aston Villa ===
After Brighton played out a 1–1 draw with Aston Villa on 18 November, it was confirmed that Calderwood would become assistant manager at Villa, working with Steve Bruce.

=== Cambridge United ===
Calderwood was appointed manager at Cambridge United on 19 December 2018. He joined the club on an initial 18-month contract. Cambridge avoided relegation in his initial period in charge.

Calderwood signed 11 new players ahead of the 2019–20 season. His new-look squad had a goalless draw at Bradford City on the opening day, before upsetting Championship side Brentford in the League Cup first round in a penalty shootout. After a 4–0 win at Mansfield Town, Calderwood signed a two-year contract extension with Cambridge on 20 September 2019. The team then had a poor run of results and he was sacked by Cambridge on 29 January 2020, following a 4–0 defeat to Salford City. He left with the team 18th in EFL League Two.

=== Blackpool ===
Blackpool head coach Neil Critchley brought Calderwood in to be co-assistant with Mike Garrity in October 2020. He remained in the role until June 2021, after assisting Blackpool's promotion to The Championship.

=== Northampton Town ===
Calderwood returned to Northampton as assistant manager on 17 June 2021.

=== Southampton ===
On 30 October 2023, Calderwood joined Southampton as first team coach. He departed the club in January 2025.

=== Return to Northampton Town ===
On 28 January 2025, Calderwood return to Northampton Town to become Director of Football.

On 9 March 2026, following the departure of Kevin Nolan, Calderwood was appointed interim manager of the club.

== Career statistics ==
=== International ===
Scotland national team
Year	Apps	Goals
1995	9	1
1996	8	0
1997	7	0
1998	8	0
1999	4	0
Total	36	1

Scores and results list Scotland's goal tally first.

No.	Date	Venue	Opponent	Score	Result	Competition
1	26 April 1995	Stadio Olimpico, Serravalle, San Marino	San Marino	2–0	2–0	UEFA Euro 1996 qualification

=== Manager ===
As of match played 2 May 2026

Team	Nat	From	To	Record				
Team	Nat	From	To	P	W	D	L	Win %
Northampton Town	England	9 October 2003	30 May 2006	154	74	40	40	48.05
Nottingham Forest	England	30 May 2006	26 December 2008	136	57	42	37	41.91
Hibernian	Scotland	18 October 2010	6 November 2011	49	12	11	26	24.49
Cambridge United	England	19 December 2018	29 January 2020	61	15	17	29	24.59
Northampton Town	England	9 March 2026	2 May 2026	10	0	0	10	0.00
Total				410	158	110	142	38.54

== Honours ==
=== Player ===
Swindon Town

- Football League First / Second Division play-offs: 1990, 1993
- Football League Third Division play-offs: 1987
- Football League Fourth Division: 1985–86

Individual

- PFA Team of the Year: 1991–92 Second Division

=== Manager ===
Northampton Town

- Football League Two second-place promotion: 2005–06

Nottingham Forest

- Football League One second-place promotion: 2007–08

Individual

- Football League Two Manager of the Month: January 2006
- Football League One Manager of the Month: August 2006, November 2007, April 2008
