= Shaun Taylor =

English footballer (born 1963)

Personal information
- Full name: Shaun Taylor
- Date of birth: 26 February 1963 (age 63)
- Place of birth: Plymouth, England
- Height: 6 ft 1 in (1.85 m)
- Position: Centre back

Team information
- Current team: Torquay United (Head of Academy)

Senior career*
Years	Team	Apps	(Gls)
–	St Blazey		
–	Bideford		
1986–1991	Exeter City	200	(17)
1991–1996	Swindon Town	212	(30)
1996–2000	Bristol City	105	(7)
- * Club domestic league appearances and goals

Shaun Taylor (born 26 February 1963) is an English former professional footballer who made more than 500 appearances in the Football League and Premier League, playing for Exeter City, Swindon Town and Bristol City.

== Playing career ==
Taylor was born in Plymouth. A hard-tackling no-nonsense defender, he played non-league football for clubs including Holsworthy FC, St Blazey and Bideford before moving to Exeter City in December 1986 at the age of 23. He captained Exeter to the Fourth Division championship in 1989–90, and played 200 league games for the club before moving to Swindon Town in July 1991 for a £200,000 fee. He was an ever-present as Swindon gained promotion to the Premier League in 1992–93, a season when he scored 13 goals including one in the play-off final, a high total for a defender, and played every game in their only season in the top flight. After a second relegation, he captained Swindon to the Second Division title, and became the first player to win the club's Player of the Year award three times. He played 259 games in all competitions for the club before joining Bristol City in September 1996 for £50,000.

After a further 105 league games for Bristol City, helping the club to promotion to Division One in 1998, Taylor retired as a player.

== Coaching career ==
He joined the club's coaching staff at Bristol City. Released in May 2005, he moved to Conference National club Forest Green Rovers in June as assistant to manager Gary Owers; their contracts were terminated by mutual consent after a poor start to the 2006–07 season. In July 2009 Taylor rejoined Exeter City as youth coach. He then became Assistant manager at Exeter City's Devon rivals Torquay United until he was dismissed in May 2013.

Taylor's younger brother Craig was also a professional footballer.

On 12 July 2013, Shaun was appointed Professional Development Coach with his hometown club Plymouth Argyle youth academy. In January 2018 Shaun Taylor returned to Torquay United as their new Head of Academy Coaching.

== Honours ==
Exeter City

- Football League Fourth Division: 1989–90

Swindon Town

- Football League First Division play-offs: 1993
- Football League Second Division: 1995–96

Individual

- PFA Team of the Year: 1988–89 Fourth Division, 1989–90 Fourth Division, 1995–96 Second Division, 1997–98 Second Division
