= Fraser Digby =

English footballer (born 1967)

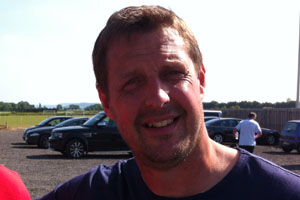
- Digby in 2013

Personal information
- Full name: Fraser Charles Digby
- Date of birth: 23 April 1967 (age 59)
- Place of birth: Sheffield, England
- Height: 6 ft 1 in (1.85 m)
- Position: Goalkeeper

Senior career*
| Years | Team | Apps | (Gls) |
| 1985–1986 | Manchester United | 0 | (0) |
| 1985 | → Oldham Athletic (loan) | 0 | (0) |
| 1986 | → Swindon Town (loan) | 0 | (0) |
| 1986–1998 | Swindon Town | 420 | (0) |
| 1992 | → Manchester United (loan) | 0 | (0) |
| 1998–2000 | Crystal Palace | 56 | (0) |
| 2001 | Barry Town | | |
| 2001 | Huddersfield Town | 0 | (0) |
| 2001–2003 | Queens Park Rangers | 20 | (0) |
| 2003 | Purfleet | 1 | (0) |
| 2003 | Kidderminster Harriers | 11 | (0) |
| Total | | 508 | (0) |

International career
| 1982 | England Schoolboys | | |
| 1983–1984 | England U17 | 16 | (1) |
| 1984–1985 | England Youth | 2 | (0) |
| 1985 | England U19 | 1 | (0) |
| 1987–1989 | England U21 | 5 | (0) |
- * Club domestic league appearances and goals

Fraser Charles Digby (born 23 April 1967) is an English football coach and former player who played as a goalkeeper. He spent much of his career with Swindon Town, for whom he played in the Premier League.

== Playing career ==
Digby was a Manchester United apprentice, making his League debut whilst on loan at Oldham Athletic in 1985, joining Swindon Town on a free transfer in December 1986 after two loan spells.

Digby, who represented England schools, youth and under-21s, did not leave Swindon until 1998. He played in the 1993 play-off final against Leicester City, a match Swindon won, thereby securing a place in the Premier League, and represented the club during their season at the top level of English football.

In late 1992, he returned to Manchester United on loan as cover for Peter Schmeichel and was selected as a substitute on several occasions but never came onto the pitch.

In August 1998, Digby signed for Crystal Palace, before moving on to Queens Park Rangers in 2001. He was released by QPR due to money shortages after which he played a handful of games for non-league Purfleet. He joined Kidderminster Harriers in 2003 on a game-by-game basis (non-contractual), while at the same time rejoining former club Swindon and taking on the two roles of commercial manager and goalkeeping coach under Andy King.

Digby also played one game for Cirencester Town in the FA Cup in 2004, signed on an emergency deal as Cirencester had a 'keeper shortage, it was then known Digby was good friends with Brian Hughes, the Cirencester manager. The game was against Bognor Regis Town and finished 4–3 to Bognor, with Cirencester coming back from 3–0 down to 3–3 to make a thrilling finish.

Digby played for a Manchester United legends team touring Ireland; his last appearance was in a friendly match against Moyola Park in July 2008.

When Digby retired from professional football, he spoke out against the methods for earning coaching badges for goalkeepers:

The problem is that to obtain full goalkeeping coaching qualifications, you have to go through all the stuff for outfield players and I don't really want to do that.

== Danny Baker on BBC Radio 5 Live ==
Digby has recently been the subject of many adaptations of popular songs, with lyrics written after a story from an anonymous correspondent to Danny Baker's radio show. It emerged that during a tour of Swindon Town's football ground, someone had come across Digby's washbag in the changing room and taken a tortoiseshell comb as a memento, thus coining the phrase 'Fraser Digby's Washbag'. Baker saw that there was "music" in these words and latched onto it. The piece, entitled "Fraser Digby's Washbag", became a regular feature of Baker's Tuesday night slot on BBC Radio 5 Live's 6–0–6 programme for 29 weeks to the final episode on 26 May 2009, during which listeners sent in their own lyrics based on the story, which Baker would sing over karaoke versions of popular songs. In December 2008, Digby surprised Baker live on air, by appearing at the BBC studios to join the show and sang a "Fraser Digby's Washbag" song himself.

== Honours ==
Swindon Town

- Football League First / Second Division play-offs: 1990, 1993
- Football League Second / Third Division: 1995–96; play-offs: 1987
