= 1999–2000 Swindon Town F.C. season =

Swindon Town
1999–2000 season
- Chairman: Rikki Hunt (until January 2000); Clive Puffett (from January 2000)
- Manager: (Northern Ireland) Jimmy Quinn (until May 2000) (England) Colin Todd (from May 2000)
- Stadium: The County Ground
- First Division: 24th (relegated)
- FA Cup: Third round
- League Cup: First round
- Top goalscorer: Hay (10)
- Highest home attendance: 12,397 vs. Manchester City (1 April 2000)
- Lowest home attendance: 4,701 vs. Huddersfield Town (7 March 2000)
- Average home league attendance: 6,977

During the 1999–2000 English football season, Swindon Town F.C. competed in the Football League First Division.

== Season summary ==
Swindon's financial problems came to a head during the 1999–2000 season when in January 2000 Swindon—£4m in debt and losing £25,000 a week—went into administration for the first time. Chairman Rikki Hunt was forced to resign and 15 staff members were made redundant. At one point, manager Jimmy Quinn was told not to pick midfielder Robin Hulbert because one more appearance would trigger a £25,000 payment to Everton under the terms of his 1996 transfer. Swindon's future was safeguarded when a consortium headed by business tycoon Terry Brady took over the club and they came out of administration towards the end of the season. But it was too late to save Swindon's place in Division One — they had already been relegated in bottom place. The club's new owner sacked manager Jimmy Quinn and appointed Colin Todd — who had won promotion to the Premiership with Bolton in 1997 — as manager, in hope of getting the club's fortunes back on track.

== Final league table ==
Pos	Team	Pld	W	D	L	GF	GA	GD	Pts	Qualification or relegation
20	Grimsby Town	46	13	12	21	41	67	−26	51	
21	West Bromwich Albion	46	10	19	17	43	60	−17	49	
22	Walsall (R)	46	11	13	22	52	77	−25	46	Relegation to the Second Division
23	Port Vale (R)	46	7	15	24	48	69	−21	36	Relegation to the Second Division
24	Swindon Town (R)	46	8	12	26	38	77	−39	36	Relegation to the Second Division

Rules for classification: 1) Points; 2) Goal difference; 3) Goals scored
(R) Relegated

Results summary

Overall								Home						Away					
Pld	W	D	L	GF	GA	GD	Pts	W	D	L	GF	GA	GD	W	D	L	GF	GA	GD
46	8	12	26	38	77	−39	36	5	6	12	23	37	−14	3	6	14	15	40	−25

Source: Soccerbase: 1999-2000 Football League First Division table

Results by round

Round	1	2	3	4	5	6	7	8	9	10	11	12	13	14	15	16	17	18	19	20	21	22	23	24	25	26	27	28	29	30	31	32	33	34	35	36	37	38	39	40	41	42	43	44	45	46
Ground	A	H	A	H	A	H	A	A	H	H	H	A	A	H	H	A	A	H	A	H	A	H	A	H	A	H	A	H	A	H	A	H	H	A	H	A	H	A	A	H	A	H	H	A	H	A
Result	D	L	W	L	L	D	L	L	W	L	D	L	L	D	W	L	L	D	D	L	D	D	L	D	L	L	L	L	D	L	D	L	L	L	W	W	L	W	L	L	L	W	W	L	L	D
Position	14	22	15	20	22	22	23	23	21	21	23	24	24	24	22	23	24	23	24	24	24	24	24	24	24	24	24	24	24	24	24	24	24	24	24	24	24	24	24	24	24	24	24	24	24	24

Source: 11v11.com: 1999-2000 Swindon Town results
A = Away; H = Home; W = Win; D = Draw; L = Loss

== Results ==
Swindon Town's score comes first

=== Legend ===
Win	Draw	Loss

=== Football League First Division ===
Date	Opponent	Venue	Result	Attendance	Scorers
7 August 1999	Walsall	A	0-0	6,437	
15 August 1999	Ipswich Town	H	1-4	6,195	Grazioli
21 August 1999	Crystal Palace	A	2-1	12,726	Grazioli, Onoura
28 August 1999	West Bromwich Albion	H	1-2	6,565	Walters
30 August 1999	Grimsby Town	H	0-1	5,705	
11 September 1999	Nottingham Forest	H	0-0	8,203	
18 September 1999	Crewe Alexandra	A	1-2	5,280	Ndah
25 September 1999	Port Vale	A	0-2	4,629	
28 September 1999	Blackburn Rovers	H	2-1	7,354	Grayson (own goal), Howe
2 October 1999	Bolton Wanderers	H	0-4	6,711	
9 October 1999	Stockport County	H	1-1	5,318	Hay
16 October 1999	Fulham	A	0-1	13,715	
19 October 1999	Barnsley	A	0-1	12,026	
23 October 1999	Sheffield United	H	2-2	5,504	Hay (2)
25 October 1999	Port Vale	H	2-1	5,703	Onoura, Grazioli
30 October 1999	Bolton Wanderers	A	0-2	12,486	
6 November 1999	Huddersfield Town	A	0-4	11,891	
12 November 1999	Norwich City	H	0-0	7,404	
20 November 1999	Wolverhampton Wanderers	A	1-1	19,917	Onoura (pen)
23 November 1999	Charlton Athletic	H	1-2	6,515	Carrick
27 November 1999	Birmingham City	A	1-1	22,620	Onoura
4 December 1999	Walsall	H	1-1	7,186	Carrick
18 December 1999	Manchester City	A	0-3	31,751	
26 December 1999	Portsmouth	H	1-1	10,279	Hay
28 December 1999	Tranmere Rovers	A	1-3	8,068	Hay
3 January 2000	Queens Park Rangers	H	0-1	9,460	
15 January 2000	Ipswich Town	A	0-3	17,326	
23 January 2000	Crystal Palace	H	2-4	5,214	Reeves, Hall
29 January 2000	West Bromwich Albion	A	1-1	11,856	Hall
5 February 2000	Grimsby Town	H	0-1	5,784	
12 February 2000	Blackburn Rovers	A	0-0	16,938	
19 February 2000	Birmingham City	H	1-4	7,591	Hay
26 February 2000	Crewe Alexandra	H	0-1	5,003	
4 March 2000	Nottingham Forest	A	1-3	19,748	Hay (pen)
7 March 2000	Huddersfield Town	H	2-0	4,701	Collins, Hay
11 March 2000	Charlton Athletic	A	1-0	19,569	Kiely (own goal)
18 March 2000	Wolverhampton Wanderers	H	1-2	8,748	A Williams
22 March 2000	Norwich City	A	2-0	13,662	Hay (2)
25 March 2000	Portsmouth	A	1-4	15,305	Gray
1 April 2000	Manchester City	H	0-2	12,397	
8 April 2000	Queens Park Rangers	A	1-2	12,633	Grazioli
15 April 2000	Tranmere Rovers	H	3-1	4,925	Griffin, Grazioli, Gray
22 April 2000	Fulham	H	1-0	7,556	Grazioli
24 April 2000	Stockport County	A	0-3	5,362	
29 April 2000	Barnsley	H	1-2	6,151	J Williams
7 May 2000	Sheffield United	A	2-2	12,603	Grazioli (2)

=== FA Cup ===
Round	Date	Opponent	Venue	Result	Attendance	Goalscorers
R3	11 December 1999	Charlton Athletic	A	1-2	10,939	Gooden

=== League Cup ===
Round	Date	Opponent	Venue	Result	Attendance	Goalscorers
R1 1st Leg	10 August 1999	Leyton Orient	H	0-1	3,587	
R1 2nd Leg	25 August 1999	Leyton Orient	A	1-1 (lost 1–2 on agg)	4,000	Walters

== Squad ==
Note: Flags indicate national team as defined under FIFA eligibility rules; some limited exceptions apply. Players may hold more than one non-FIFA nationality.

No.	Pos.	Nation	Player
1	GK	AUS	Frank Talia
2	DF	ENG	Mark Robinson
3	DF	WAL	Gareth Hall
4	MF	SCO	Scott Leitch
5	DF	ENG	Gareth Davies
6	DF	ENG	Bryan Smith
7	MF	ENG	Bobby Howe
9	FW	ENG	Wayne Gray (on loan from Wimbledon)
10	FW	ENG	Giuliano Grazioli
11	MF	WAL	Michael Meaker (on loan from Bristol Rovers)
12	DF	ENG	Alan Reeves
14	FW	ENG	Alan Young
16	MF	SCO	Lee Collins
17	FW	ENG	Steve Cowe
18	GK	ENG	Steve Mildenhall

No.	Pos.	Nation	Player
19	DF	ENG	Adam Willis
20	FW	ENG	Charlie Griffin
21	DF	ENG	Sol Davis
23	MF	FRA	Philippe Cuervo
24	DF	ENG	Sam Campagna
25	MF	ENG	Frazer McHugh
26	FW	IRL	Nicky Burke
27	DF	ENG	Jamie Mills
28	DF	NIR	Ricky Culbertson
29	GK	IRL	Alan Flanagan
30	MF	NIR	Paul McAreavey
31	MF	WAL	Alun Hughes
32	DF	ENG	James Williams
33	MF	WAL	Andy Williams
40	FW	NIR	Jimmy Quinn (player-manager)

=== Left club during season ===
Note: Flags indicate national team as defined under FIFA eligibility rules; some limited exceptions apply. Players may hold more than one non-FIFA nationality.

No.	Pos.	Nation	Player
6	DF	ENG	Craig Taylor (to Plymouth Argyle)
8	FW	NGR	George Ndah (to Wolverhampton Wanderers)
34	MF	ENG	Paul Thirlwell (to Sunderland)
14	MF	ENG	Mark Walters (to Bristol Rovers)
11	MF	ENG	Ty Gooden (to Gillingham)
9	FW	SCO	Iffy Onoura (to Gillingham)

No.	Pos.	Nation	Player
6	MF	ENG	Michael Carrick (to West Ham United)
8	FW	BRB	Mark McCammon (to Brentford)
13	GK	ENG	Jimmy Glass (to Cambridge United)
31	GK	NED	Bart Griemink (to Peterborough United)
15	FW	SCO	Chris Hay (to Huddersfield Town)
22	MF	ENG	Robin Hulbert (to Bristol City)
