= 2000–01 Swindon Town F.C. season =

Swindon Town
2000–01 season
- Chairman: Terry Brady
- Manager: Colin Todd (until 1 November); Andy King (from 8 November)
- Stadium: County Ground
- Second Division: 20th
- FA Cup: Third round
- League Cup: Second round
- LDV Vans Trophy: Semi-finals (Southern Area)
- Top goalscorer: League: Invincibile (9); All: Invincibile (10)
- Average home league attendance: 6,187
Home colours	Away colours

During the 2000–01 English football season, Swindon Town F.C. competed in the Football League Second Division.

== Season summary ==
Swindon had a dismal start to the 2000–01 season and Todd quit in November to take the assistant manager's job at Premiership side Derby County. Todd's assistant, Andy King, stepped up to the manager's seat and remained there for the rest of the season. He achieved survival in Division Two but his short-term contract was not renewed at the end of the season.

== Final league table ==
Pos	Team	Pld	W	D	L	GF	GA	GD	Pts	Qualification or relegation
18	Northampton Town	46	15	12	19	46	59	−13	57	
19	Cambridge United	46	14	11	21	61	77	−16	53	
20	Swindon Town	46	13	13	20	47	65	−18	52	
21	Bristol Rovers (R)	46	12	15	19	53	57	−4	51	Relegation to Football League Third Division
22	Luton Town (R)	46	9	13	24	52	80	−28	40	Relegation to Football League Third Division

Rules for classification: 1) Points; 2) Goal difference; 3) Goals scored
(R) Relegated

== Results ==
Swindon Town's score comes first

=== Legend ===
Win	Draw	Loss

=== Football League Second Division ===
Date	Opponent	Venue	Result	Attendance	Scorers
12 August 2000	Colchester United	H	0–0	7,296	
19 August 2000	Reading	A	0–2	14,134	
26 August 2000	Walsall	H	1–4	5,492	Invincibile
28 August 2000	Port Vale	A	0–3	3,926	
9 September 2000	Bristol City	A	1–0	10,110	Reeves
12 September 2000	Bournemouth	A	0–3	3,673	
23 September 2000	Luton Town	A	3–2	4,933	Duke, M Williams (2)
30 September 2000	Wigan Athletic	H	2–2	4,895	Alexander, M Robinson
8 October 2000	Oxford United	H	2–1	7,975	Reeves, Grazioli
14 October 2000	Oldham Athletic	A	0–1	4,009	
17 October 2000	Swansea City	A	0–0	6,331	
21 October 2000	Bristol Rovers	H	1–3	8,097	Robertson
24 October 2000	Millwall	H	0–2	5,014	
28 October 2000	Notts County	A	2–3	5,402	Invincibile (2)
31 October 2000	Cambridge United	H	3–1	3,452	Invincibile (2), O'Halloran
4 November 2000	Wycombe Wanderers	H	1–1	5,226	Reeves
7 November 2000	Wrexham	H	2–2	4,423	Invincibile, O'Halloran (pen)
11 November 2000	Peterborough United	A	0–4	5,700	
25 November 2000	Stoke City	H	0–3	4,904	
2 December 2000	Northampton Town	A	1–0	5,816	Alexander
16 December 2000	Rotherham United	H	2–1	4,740	Woan, Invincibile
23 December 2000	Bury	A	0–1	2,921	
26 December 2000	Brentford	H	2–3	6,649	Invincibile, Howe
1 January 2001	Walsall	A	0–1	5,548	
13 January 2001	Port Vale	H	0–1	5,175	
27 January 2001	Bury	H	3–0	4,960	Reddy, O'Halloran (pen), Cowe
3 February 2001	Wrexham	A	1–1	3,004	van der Linden
10 February 2001	Bristol City	H	1–1	10,031	Reddy
17 February 2001	Cambridge United	A	1–0	4,046	Reddy
20 February 2001	Bournemouth	H	1–1	5,948	Alexander
24 February 2001	Luton Town	H	1–3	7,160	Alexander
3 March 2001	Wigan Athletic	A	0–0	6,563	
6 March 2001	Oldham Athletic	H	3–0	4,168	Kelly (own goal), McAreavey, Grazioli
10 March 2001	Oxford United	A	2–0	7,480	S Robinson (2)
17 March 2001	Swansea City	H	1–1	6,724	O'Halloran (pen)
20 March 2001	Colchester United	A	1–0	2,736	Reddy
24 March 2001	Bristol Rovers	A	0–0	8,114	
27 March 2001	Reading	H	0–1	9,673	
31 March 2001	Rotherham United	A	3–4	7,106	Alexander (2), Woan
7 April 2001	Northampton Town	H	1–1	5,932	Woan
10 April 2001	Brentford	A	1–0	4,180	Heywood
14 April 2001	Millwall	A	0–1	12,266	
16 April 2001	Notts County	H	1–2	6,207	Heywood
21 April 2001	Wycombe Wanderers	A	0–0	6,844	
28 April 2001	Peterborough United	H	2–1	8,145	Alexander, Invincibile
5 May 2001	Stoke City	A	1–4	20,591	O'Halloran (pen)

=== FA Cup ===
Round	Date	Opponent	Venue	Result	Attendance	Goalscorers
R1	18 November 2000	Ilkeston Town	H	0–1	4,406	Willis, M Williams, Howe, Young
R2	9 December 2000	Gateshead	H	5–0	3,907	O'Halloran (2), Cowe (2), Howe
R3	6 January 2001	Coventry City	H	0–2	14,445	

=== League Cup ===
Round	Date	Opponent	Venue	Result	Attendance	Goalscorers
R1 1st Leg	22 August 2000	Exeter City	H	1–1	5,193	Howe
R1 2nd Leg	6 September 2000	Exeter City	A	2–1 (won 3–2 on agg)	2,825	Reeves, Invincibile
R2 1st Leg	18 September 2000	Tranmere Rovers	A	1–1	4,289	Hazell (own goal)
R2 2nd Leg	26 September 2000	Tranmere Rovers	H	0–1 (lost 1–2 on agg)	4,573	

=== Football League Trophy ===
Round	Date	Opponent	Venue	Result	Attendance	Goalscorers
Southern R2	9 January 2001	Millwall	A	0–0 (won 3–2 on pens)	2,394	
Southern QF	30 January 2001	Wycombe Wanderers	H	2–1	3,244	Alexander
Southern SF	13 February 2001	Southend United	A	1–2 (a.e.t.)	3,337	Reddy

== Squad ==
Note: Flags indicate national team as defined under FIFA eligibility rules; some limited exceptions apply. Players may hold more than one non-FIFA nationality.

No.	Pos.	Nation	Player
1	GK	NED	Bart Griemink
2	DF	ENG	Mark Robinson
3	DF	ENG	Sol Davis
4	MF	ENG	Matthew Hewlett
5	DF	ENG	Adam Willis
6	DF	NED	Antoine van der Linden
7	MF	IRL	Keith O'Halloran
8	MF	ENG	Bobby Howe
10	FW	ENG	Giuliano Grazioli
11	MF	SCO	David Duke
12	DF	ARG	Juan Cobián
14	MF	ENG	Steve Cowe
15	MF	WAL	Andy Williams
17	FW	AUS	Danny Invincibile
18	FW	ENG	Gary Alexander
19	DF	ENG	Matthew Heywood

No.	Pos.	Nation	Player
20	MF	ENG	Frazer McHugh
21	DF	WAL	Gareth Davies
22	DF	ENG	Alan Reeves
23	GK	ENG	Steve Mildenhall
24	MF	BEL	Adrian Bakalli
25	MF	ENG	Steve Robinson
26	FW	ENG	Alan Young
27	MF	NIR	Paul McAreavey
28	MF	ENG	Jamie Mills
29	DF	ENG	James Williams
30	DF	WAL	Gareth Hall
31	MF	ENG	Ian Woan
32	DF	ENG	Sam Campagna
33	GK	ENG	Craig Farr
35	MF	ENG	Kevin Halliday

=== Left club during season ===
Note: Flags indicate national team as defined under FIFA eligibility rules; some limited exceptions apply. Players may hold more than one non-FIFA nationality.

No.	Pos.	Nation	Player
25	DF	FIN	Marko Tuomela (on loan from Tromsø IL)
9	DF	ENG	Charlie Griffin (to Woking)
16	DF	DEN	Kim Heiselberg (Released)
19	MF	AUS	Mark Robertson (to Dundee)
16	MF	NIR	Jim Whitley (on loan from Manchester City)

No.	Pos.	Nation	Player
25	DF	ENG	Richard Dryden (on loan from Southampton)
9	FW	BER	Kyle Lightbourne (on loan from Stoke City)
24	FW	ENG	Martin Williams (Released)
16	FW	IRL	Michael Reddy (on loan from Sunderland)
