= 1998–99 Swindon Town F.C. season =

English football season

Swindon Town
1998–99 season
- Chairman: Rikki Hunt
- Manager: Steve McMahon (until 23 September); Mike Walsh (caretaker 23 September - 2 October); Jimmy Quinn (from 2 October)
- Stadium: County Ground
- First Division: 17th
- FA Cup: Third round
- League Cup: First round
- Top goalscorer: Onoura (20)
- Average home league attendance: 6,651

During the 1998–99 English football season, Swindon Town F.C. competed in the Football League First Division.

== Season summary ==
When the 1998–99 season kicked off, Swindon failed to win their first five games, scoring just three goals and the calls for McMahon's sacking began to be heard. Chairman Rikki Hunt and McMahon seemed united – McMahon saying he wouldn't resign, Hunt saying he wouldn't sack him. Two consecutive derby wins, against Bristol City and Oxford, only strengthened their position. This was followed by a 5–2 defeat at Portsmouth – and when Watford then won 4–1 at the County Ground, the fans held an on-pitch protest, sitting in the centre circle at the end of the match, demonstrating that both McMahon and Hunt should resign. McMahon left the club "by mutual consent". Jimmy Quinn was appointed as McMahon's replacement and managed to keep Swindon in the division with the club finishing the season in 17th place.

== Final league table ==
Pos	Team	Pld	W	D	L	GF	GA	GD	Pts
15	Tranmere Rovers	46	12	20	14	63	61	+2	56
16	Stockport County	46	12	17	17	49	60	−11	53
17	Swindon Town	46	13	11	22	59	81	−22	50
18	Crewe Alexandra	46	12	12	22	54	78	−24	48
19	Portsmouth	46	11	14	21	57	73	−16	47

Rules for classification: 1) Points; 2) Goals scored; 3) Goal difference

== Results ==
Swindon Town's score comes first

=== Legend ===
Win	Draw	Loss

=== Football League First Division ===
Date	Opponent	Venue	Result	Attendance	Scorers
8 August 1998	Sheffield United	A	1–2	15,937	Holdsworth (own goal)
15 August 1998	Sunderland	H	1–1	10,207	Onoura
22 August 1998	Wolverhampton Wanderers	A	0–1	21,537	
29 August 1998	Port Vale	H	1–1	7,800	Hall
31 August 1998	Bury	A	0–3	4,513	
5 September 1998	Bristol City	H	3–2	8,537	Walters, Ndah, Onoura
9 September 1998	Oxford United	H	4–1	8,305	Ndah (2), Onoura (2)
12 September 1998	Portsmouth	A	2–5	10,105	Onoura, Ndah
19 September 1998	Watford	H	1–4	8,781	Ndah
25 September 1998	Tranmere Rovers	A	0–0	5,501	
29 September 1998	Bolton Wanderers	A	1–2	16,497	Onoura
3 October 1998	Stockport County	H	2–3	7,961	Onoura, Walters
9 October 1998	Huddersfield Town	H	3–0	8,316	Onoura, Walters, Bullock
17 October 1998	Ipswich Town	A	0–1	13,212	
20 October 1998	Birmingham City	A	1–1	19,485	Gooden
24 October 1998	West Bromwich Albion	H	2–2	8,967	Hall, Walters
31 October 1998	Queens Park Rangers	H	3–1	8,500	Walters (2), Onoura
7 November 1998	Crewe Alexandra	A	2–0	4,469	Onoura (2)
14 November 1998	Bradford City	A	0–3	14,897	
21 November 1998	Crystal Palace	H	2–0	11,718	Walters, Ndah
28 November 1998	Grimsby Town	A	0–1	8,657	
5 December 1998	Norwich City	H	1–1	9,262	Walters
12 December 1998	Bradford City	H	1–4	7,447	Onoura
19 December 1998	Barnsley	A	3–1	15,342	Onoura (2), Hay
26 December 1998	Wolverhampton Wanderers	H	1–0	11,627	Onoura
28 December 1998	Bristol City	A	1–3	16,257	Ndah
9 January 1999	Sheffield United	H	2–2	7,583	Ndah, Onoura
16 January 1999	Port Vale	A	1–0	5,405	Ndah
30 January 1999	Bury	H	1–1	7,797	West (own goal)
6 February 1999	Sunderland	A	0–2	41,304	
13 February 1999	Oxford United	A	0–2	8,179	
20 February 1999	Portsmouth	H	3–3	10,110	Hay (2), Onoura
26 February 1999	Watford	A	1–0	8,692	Howe
3 March 1999	Tranmere Rovers	H	2–3	5,726	Ndah, Reeves
6 March 1999	Bolton Wanderers	H	3–3	8,392	Howe, Hay, Walters
9 March 1999	Stockport County	A	1–2	6,098	Walters
13 March 1999	Crewe Alexandra	H	1–2	7,434	Hay
20 March 1999	Queens Park Rangers	A	0–4	11,184	
3 April 1999	Ipswich Town	H	0–6	10,337	
5 April 1999	Huddersfield Town	A	2–1	11,719	Howe, Hay
10 April 1999	Birmingham City	H	0–1	8,896	
13 April 1999	West Bromwich Albion	A	1–1	9,601	Ndah
17 April 1999	Crystal Palace	A	1–0	18,660	Onoura
24 April 1999	Grimsby Town	H	2–0	7,197	Onoura, Ndah
1 May 1999	Norwich City	A	1–2	17,307	Onoura
9 May 1999	Barnsley	H	1–3	8,182	Griffin

=== FA Cup ===
Round	Date	Opponent	Venue	Result	Attendance	Goalscorers
R3	2 January 1999	Barnsley	H	0–0	8,016	
R3R	19 January 1999	Barnsley	A	1–3	10,510	Walters

=== League Cup ===
Round	Date	Opponent	Venue	Result	Attendance	Goalscorers
R1 1st Leg	12 August 1998	Wycombe Wanderers	H	2–1	4,682	Reeves, Ndah
R1 2nd Leg	18 August 1998	Wycombe Wanderers	A	0–2 (lost 2–3 on agg)	2,478	

== Squad ==
Note: Flags indicate national team as defined under FIFA eligibility rules; some limited exceptions apply. Players may hold more than one non-FIFA nationality.

No.	Pos.	Nation	Player
-	GK	AUS	Frank Talia
-	DF	ENG	Brian Borrows
-	DF	ENG	Gareth Hall
-	DF	ENG	Mark Robinson
-	DF	ENG	Alan Reeves
-	MF	ENG	Ty Gooden
-	MF	ENG	Mark Walters
-	MF	SCO	Scott Leitch
-	MF	ENG	Bobby Howe
-	FW	SCO	Iffy Onoura
-	FW	ENG	George Ndah
-	FW	SCO	Chris Hay
-	DF	ENG	Sol Davis
-	MF	ENG	Darren Bullock
-	GK	ENG	Jimmy Glass
-	DF	ENG	Craig Taylor
-	DF	ENG	David Kerslake

No.	Pos.	Nation	Player
-	DF	ENG	Adam Willis
-	MF	ENG	Kevin Watson
-	MF	ENG	Robin Hulbert
-	DF	ENG	Des Linton (on loan from Peterborough United)
-	FW	ENG	Shayne Bradley (on loan from Southampton)
-	DF	ENG	Gareth Davies
-	MF	FRA	Philippe Cuervo
-	FW	ENG	Steve Cowe
-	MF	SCO	Lee Collins
-	FW	ENG	Charlie Griffin
-	DF	ENG	Jimmy Williams
-	MF	ENG	Frazer McHugh
-	DF	ENG	Sam Campagna
-	MF	NIR	Paul McAreavey
-	GK	ENG	Steve Mildenhall
-	MF	ENG	Peter Holcroft
-	MF	ENG	Jamie Mills

=== Left club during the season ===
Note: Flags indicate national team as defined under FIFA eligibility rules; some limited exceptions apply. Players may hold more than one non-FIFA nationality.

No.	Pos.	Nation	Player
-	FW	IRL	Neale Fenn (on loan from Tottenham Hotspur)
-	MF	ENG	Darren Bullock (to Bury)

No.	Pos.	Nation	Player
-	DF	ENG	Phil King (to Brighton & Hove Albion)
