= List of Swindon Town F.C. seasons =

This is a list of seasons played by Swindon Town Football Club in English and European football, from the club's formation in 1879 to the present day. It details the club's achievements in major competitions, and the top scorers for each season where known.

== Seasons ==
Season	League									FA Cup	EFL Cup (Note: The EFL Cup competition did not start until the 1960–61 season.)	EFL Trophy	Other		Top scorer (Note: Includes goals scored in all competitive competitions including cup games, players with no flags can be assumed English.) (Note: Goal records for the period 1879–1920 are incomplete and possibly erroneous but have been included here for completeness.)	Attendance (Note: Attendances up till the 1920s are unreliable, but included here for completeness.)
Season	Division	P	W	D	L	GF	GA	Pts	Pos	FA Cup	EFL Cup	EFL Trophy	Other		Top scorer	Attendance
Club played friendly games and cup games only until 1894
1879–80	None	1	0	0	1	0	4			—						
1881–82	None	1	0	1	0	2	2			—						
1884–85	None	1	1	0	0	4	0			—						
1886–87	None	0	0	0	0	0	0			R2			Wiltshire Cup	W		
1887–88	None	3	2	0	1	8	2			R1			Wiltshire Cup	W		
1888–89	None	19	13	4	2	63	24			QR2			Wiltshire Cup	W	T Bennett (1)	
1889–90	None	15 (Note: Although the team played 15 games, the result of the game against Trowbridge Town on 23 November 1889 is not known.)	11	1	2	48	13			QR1			Wiltshire Cup	W	T Bennett (1)	
1890–91	None	0	0	0	0	0	0			QR3			Wiltshire Cup	W	Robbie Reynolds (3)	
1891–92	None	24	17	2	5	108	38			QR1			Wiltshire Cup	W	Dick Jones (1)	
1892–93	None	20	11	2	7	64	35			QR4					Dick Jones (4)	
1893–94	None	27	19	3	5	86	44			QR4			FA Amateur Cup	R2	Dick Jones (4)	
Club turns professional and joins Southern League in 1894
1894–95	SL Div1	16	4	1	11	24	48	9	9th (Note: As one of the teams at the bottom of the table, Swindon played in the relegation play-offs and performed well enough to retain their place in the league.)	QR2					Dick Jones (2)	4,500
1895–96	SL Div1	18	6	4	8	38	41	16	7th	QR3					Alf Hames (2)	2,688
1896–97	SL Div1	20	8	3	9	33	37	19	6th	QR5					Richie Cox (2)	3,286
1897–98	SL Div1	22	7	2	13	36	48	16	10th	—					Jock Bell (2)	3,236
1897–98	WFL (Note: During the period 1897–1902, Swindon played in both the Southern League Division 1 and the Western League to increase the number of competitive fixtures they were playing. Swindon resigned from the league after the second consecutive bottom of the table finish in 1901–02 and entered the Reserve side instead. Swindon Reserves continued to play in the Western League until 1949.)	14	9	1	4	32	15	19	2nd	—					Jock Bell (2)	3,236
1898–99	SL Div1	24	9	5	10	43	49	23	9th	—						3,917
1898–99	WFL	8	5	1	2	16	10	11	1st	—						3,917
1899–1900	SL Div1	28	15	2	11	50	42	32	5th	—						2,643
1899–1900	WFL	6	3	0	3	7	7	6	3rd	—						2,643
1900–01	SL Div1	28	3	8	17	19	47	14	15th	QR5					Billy Smith (4)	2,320
1900–01	WFL	16	2	2	12	9	35	6	9th	QR5					Billy Smith (4)	2,320
1901–02	SL Div1	30	2	3	25	17	93	8	16th	QR5					Frank Becton (3)	1,936
1901–02	WFL	16	0	2	14	8	53	2	9th	QR5					Frank Becton (3)	1,936
1902–03	SL Div1	30	10	7	13	38	46	27	12th	IR (Note: An Intermediate Round was played after the fifth qualifying round against Barnsley which Swindon lost 0–4.)					Jimmy Pugh (7)	4,563
1903–04	SL Div1	34	10	11	13	30	42	31	10th	—					Jimmy Pugh (4)	3,727
1904–05	SL Div1	34	12	5	17	41	59	29	16th	—					Jimmy Pugh (5)	4,482
1905–06	SL Div1	34	8	9	17	31	52	25	15th	R1					Bertie Lyon (2)	3,453
1905–06	UL (Note: Swindon played in the United League for the 1905–06 season to play more competitive games.)	18	7	3	8	33	29	?	?	R1					Bertie Lyon (7)	3,453
1906–07	SL Div1	38	11	11	16	43	54	33	17th	QR5						4,750
1907–08	SL Div1	38	16	10	12	55	40	42	5th	R3						5,167
1908–09	SL Div1	40	22	5	13	96	55	49	2nd	R1						5,895
1909–10	SL Div1	42	22	10	10	92	46	54	2nd	SF			Dubonnet Cup	W	Harold Fleming (5)	4,875
1910–11	SL Div1	38	24	5	9	80	31	53	1st	QF			Southern Charity Cup	W	Archie Bown (3)	5,714
1911–12	SL Div1	38	21	6	11	82	50	48	4th	SF			Charity Shield	RU	Harold Fleming (6)	5,682
1912–13	SL Div1	38	20	8	10	66	41	48	2nd	R3					Archie Bown (2)	5,643
1913–14	SL Div1	38	21	8	9	81	41	50	1st (Note: Swindon become league champions on goal average, with the top two clubs scoring the same number of points over the season. Swindon achieved an average of 1.98 compared to second place Crystal Palace's 1.88.)	R2					Billy Batty (2)	7,079
1914–15	SL Div1	38	15	11	12	77	59	41	9th	R1						4,300
No competitive football was played between 1915 and 1919 due to World War I
1919–20	SL Div1	42	17	7	18	65	68	41	13th	R2					George Travers (2)	8,600
1920–21	Div 3	42	21	10	11	73	49	52	4th	R2					Harold Fleming (17)	5,423
1921–22	Div 3(S)	42	16	13	13	72	60	45	6th	R2					Harold Fleming (13)	7,460
1922–23	Div 3(S)	42	17	11	14	62	56	45	9th	R1					Jack Johnson (20)	6,460
1923–24	Div 3(S)	42	17	13	12	58	44	47	6th	QF					Jack Johnson (15)	6,331
1924–25	Div 3(S)	42	20	11	11	66	38	51	4th	R1					Jack Johnson (18)	7,099
1925–26	Div 3(S)	42	20	6	16	69	64	46	6th	R4					Frank Richardson (28)	6,648
1926–27	Div 3(S)	42	21	9	12	100	85	51	5th	R1					Harry Morris (48)	8,274
1927–28	Div 3(S)	42	19	9	14	90	69	47	6th	R4					Harry Morris (44)	6,684
1928–29	Div 3(S)	42	15	13	14	75	72	43	10th	R5					Harry Morris (31)	5,455
1929–30	Div 3(S)	42	13	12	17	73	83	38	14th	R4					Harry Morris (29)	5,426
1930–31	Div 3(S)	42	18	6	18	89	94	42	12th	R1					Harry Morris (35)	4,929
1931–32	Div 3(S)	42	14	6	22	70	84	34	17th	R1					Harry Morris (29)	5,031
1932–33	Div 3(S)	42	9	11	22	60	105	29	22nd	R3					Harry Morris (13)	4,893
1933–34	Div 3(S)	42	17	11	14	64	68	45	8th	R3					Tommy Armstrong (23)	9,117
1934–35	Div 3(S)	42	13	12	17	67	78	38	16th	R4			Third Division South Cup	R1	Alan Fowler (25)	7,304
1935–36	Div 3(S)	42	14	8	20	64	73	36	19th	R1			Third Division South Cup	R1	Alan Fowler (18)	7,101
1936–37	Div 3(S)	42	14	11	17	75	73	39	13th	R2			Third Division South Cup	RU	Jimmy Cookson (27)	8,455
1937–38	Div 3(S)	42	17	10	15	49	49	44	8th	R4			Third Division South Cup	R1	Alan Fowler (16)	9,640
1938–39	Div 3(S)	42	18	8	16	72	77	44	9th	R2			Third Division South Cup	R3	Ben Morton (32)	10,511
1939–40 (Note: The 1939–40 season was abandoned in early September and all results annulled, after only three matches had been played.)	Div 3(S)	3	0	1	2	2	4	1		n/a			Third Division South Cup	R1	Alan Fowler (2)	—N/a
No competitive football was played between 1939 and 1946 due to World War II
1945–46	n/a (Note: The FA Cup was contested in 1945–46 but the Football League did not resume until the following season.)	–	–	–	–	–	–	–	–	R1					—N/a	—N/a
1946–47	Div 3(S)	42	19	11	12	84	73	49	4th	R2					Bill Stephens (28)	15,123
1947–48	Div 3(S)	42	10	16	16	41	46	36	16th	R5					Maurice Owen (17)	15,924
1948–49	Div 3(S)	42	18	15	9	64	56	51	4th	R1					Morris Jones (25)	16,625
1949–50	Div 3(S)	42	15	11	16	59	62	41	14th	R2					Morris Jones (13)	14,070
1950–51	Div 3(S)	46	18	4	24	55	67	40	17th	R2					Jimmy Bain (9)	10,690
1951–52	Div 3(S)	46	14	14	18	51	68	42	16th	R5					Maurice Owen (24)	10,557
1952–53	Div 3(S)	46	14	12	20	64	79	40	18th	R3					Maurice Owen (21)	9,746
1953–54	Div 3(S)	46	15	10	21	67	70	40	20th (Note: Swindon ended the season with the same points and goal average as the 19th placed Bournemouth & Boscombe Athletic and were listed in 20th place alphabetically.)	R2					Mike Bull (12)	10,753
1954–55	Div 3(S)	46	11	15	20	46	64	37	21st	R1					Maurice Owen (12)	8,243
1955–56	Div 3(S)	46	8	14	24	34	78	30	24th	R4					Maurice Owen (15)	7,379
1956–57	Div 3(S)	46	15	6	25	66	96	36	23rd	R2					Bob Edwards (26)	8,736
1957–58	Div 3(S)	46	21	15	10	79	50	57	4th	R1					John Richards (16)	12,004
1958–59	Div 3 (Note: Swindon Town were placed in the new Third Division following the amalgamation of Third Division South and Third Division North.)	46	16	13	17	59	57	45	15th	R2					Bob Edwards (10)	11,351
1959–60	Div 3	46	19	8	19	69	78	46	16th	R1					David Layne (20)	10,233
1960–61	Div 3	46	14	15	17	62	55	43	16th	R2	R2				Ernie Hunt (17)	11,043
1961–62	Div 3	46	17	15	14	78	71	49	9th	R1	R2				Ernie Hunt (18)	9,692
1962–63	Div 3 ↑	46	22	14	10	87	56	58	2nd	R4	R3				Ernie Hunt (27)	13,530
1963–64	Div 2	42	14	10	18	57	69	38	14th	R5	R4				Bill Atkins (12)	18,277
1964–65	Div 2 ↓	42	14	5	23	63	81	33	21st	R3	R2				Mike Summerbee (13)	15,081
1965–66	Div 3	46	19	13	14	74	48	51	7th	R3	R2				Keith East (24)	12,937
1966–67	Div 3	46	20	10	16	81	59	50	8th	R5	R4				Don Rogers (32)	12,297
1967–68	Div 3	46	16	17	13	74	51	49	9th	R4	R1				Don Rogers (28)	13,456
1968–69	Div 3 ↑	46	27	10	9	71	35	64	2nd (Note: Swindon finished runners-up in the Third Division in 1968–69 on goal average having scored the same number of points as the champions. Watford recorded an average of 2.18 against Swindon's 2.03.)	R3	W				Don Rogers (30)	17,857
1969–70	Div 2	42	17	16	9	57	47	50	5th	QF	R3		Anglo-Italian Cup Anglo-Italian League Cup	W W	Arthur Horsfield (28)	19,852
1970–71	Div 2	42	15	12	15	61	51	42	12th	R4	R4				Don Rogers (21)	15,799
1971–72	Div 2	42	15	12	15	47	47	42	11th	R3	R2				Peter Noble (14)	13,356
1972–73	Div 2	42	10	16	16	46	60	36	16th	R4	R2				(Republic of Ireland) Ray Treacy (14)	10,024
1973–74	Div 2 ↓	42	7	11	24	36	72	25	22nd	R3	R2				Peter Eastoe (8)	7,104
1974–75	Div 3	46	21	11	14	64	58	53	4th	R4	R1				Peter Eastoe (31)	8,067
1975–76	Div 3	46	16	8	22	62	75	40	19th	R3	R2				David Syrett (16)	7,514
1976–77	Div 3	46	15	15	16	68	75	45	11th	R4	R1				David Moss (21)	7,625
1977–78	Div 3	46	16	16	14	67	60	48	10th	R3	R4				David Moss (22)	7,159
1978–79	Div 3	46	25	7	14	74	52	57	5th	R4	R3				Chic Bates (16)	7,751
1979–80	Div 3	46	19	8	19	71	63	46	10th	R4	SF				Alan Mayes (28)	8,681
1980–81	Div 3	46	13	15	18	51	56	41	17th	R2	R3				Andy Rowland (13)	6,694
1981–82	Div 3 ↓	46	13	13	20	55	71	52	22nd	R3	R1				Roy Carter (15)	5,560
1982–83	Div 4	46	19	11	16	61	54	68	8th	R4	R1				Paul Rideout (23)	4,018
1983–84	Div 4	46	15	13	18	58	56	58	17th	R4	R1	QF(S)			Alan Mayes (20)	3,154
1984–85	Div 4	46	21	9	16	62	58	72	8th	R1	R1	R1(S)			Colin Gordon (17)	2,994
1985–86	Div 4 ↑	46	32	6	8	82	43	102 (Note: Swindon were the second team in the League to score over 100 points in one season, breaking York City's record of 101 from the 1983-84 season.)	1st	R1	R4	PR(S)			Charlie Henry (18)	6,457
1986–87	Div 3 ↑	46	25	12	9	77	47	87	3rd	R4	R2	SF(S)	League play-offs	W	Dave Bamber (21)	7,715
1987–88	Div 2	44	16	11	17	73	60	59	12th	R4	R3	—			(Northern Ireland) Jimmy Quinn (31)	9,773
1988–89	Div 2	46	20	16	10	68	53	76	6th	R4	R2	—	League play-offs	SF	(Scotland) Duncan Shearer (15)	8,645
1989–90	Div 2	46	20	14	12	79	59	74	4th	R3	R4	—	League play-offs	W (Note: Swindon were initially promoted to Division One after winning the play-off competition. As a result of an investigation into the club during the close-season into illegal payments; the team was initially relegated to Division Three before being re-instated into Division Two on appeal with Sunderland taking their place. For more information see: History of Swindon Town F.C.)	(Scotland) Duncan Shearer (27)	9,444
1990–91	Div 2	46	12	14	20	65	73	50	21st	R4	R3	—			(Scotland) Duncan Shearer (23)	9,439
1991–92	Div 2	46	18	15	13	69	55	69	8th	R5	R4	—			(Scotland) Duncan Shearer (32)	9,654
1992–93	Div 1 (Note: On the formation of the FA Premiership, Division Two was re-designated Division One.) ↑	46	21	13	12	74	59	76	5th	R3	R3	—	Anglo-Italian Cup League play-offs	GS W	Craig Maskell (23)	10,576
1993–94	Prem ↓	42	5	15	22	47	100 (Note: Swindon were the first Premier League team to concede 100 goals in a season.)	30	22nd	R3	R3	—	Anglo-Italian Cup	GS	(Norway) Jan Åge Fjørtoft (13)	15,274
1994–95	Div 1 ↓	46	12	12	22	54	73	48	21st	R4	SF	—			(Norway) Jan Åge Fjørtoft (25)	9,408
1995–96	Div 2 ↑	46	25	17	4	71	34	92	1st	R5	R2	R2(S)			Wayne Allison (20)	10,046
1996–97	Div 1	46	15	9	22	52	71	54	19th	R3	R3	—			Wayne Allison (13)	9,265
1997–98	Div 1	46	14	10	22	42	73	52	18th	R3	R1	—			(Scotland) Chris Hay (14)	9,505
1998–99	Div 1	46	13	11	22	59	81	50	17th	R3	R1	—			(Scotland) Iffy Onuora (20)	8,656
1999–2000	Div 1 ↓	46	8	12	26	38	77	36	24th	R3	R1	—			(Scotland) Chris Hay (10)	6,977
2000–01	Div 2	46	13	13	20	47	65	52	20th	R3	R2	SF(S)			(Australia) Danny Invincibile (10)	6,186
2001–02	Div 2	46	15	14	17	46	56	59	13th	R2	R2	R1(S)			(England) Giuliano Grazioli (8) (Australia) Danny Invincibile (8)	6,362
2002–03	Div 2	46	16	12	18	59	63	60	10th	R2	R1	R2(S)			(England) Sam Parkin (26)	5,462
2003–04	Div 2	46	20	13	13	76	58	73	5th	R1	R2	R1(S)	League play-offs	RU	(England) Sam Parkin (23)	7,839
2004–05	Lge 1 (Note: Division Two was re-titled League One following the creation of the Championship for the 2004–05 season.)	46	17	12	17	66	68	63	12th	R2	R2	SF(S)			(England) Sam Parkin (24)	5,835
2005–06	Lge 1 ↓	46	11	15	20	46	65	48	23rd	R1	R1	R2(S)			(New Zealand) Rory Fallon (14)	5,951
2006–07	Lge 2 ↑	46	25	10	11	58	38	85	3rd (Note: Swindon Town were promoted to League One after finishing in the 3rd automatic promotion place.)	R3	R1	R1(S)			(Wales) Christian Roberts (13)	7,419
2007–08	Lge 1	46	16	13	17	63	56	61	13th	R3	R1	R2(S)			(Republic of Ireland) Simon Cox (16)	7,170
2008–09	Lge 1	46	12	17	17	68	71	53	15th	R1	R1	QF(S)			(Republic of Ireland) Simon Cox (32)	7,499
2009–10	Lge 1	46	22	16	8	73	57	82	5th	R3	R2	QF(S)	League play-offs	RU	(England) Billy Paynter (29)	8,389
2010–11	Lge 1 ↓	46	9	14	23	50	72	41	24th	R2	R1	QF(S)			(England) Charlie Austin (17)	8,458
2011–12	Lge 2 ↑	46	29	6	11	75	32	93	1st	R4	R2	RU			(England) Alan Connell (12) (England) Paul Benson (12)	8,411
2012–13	Lge 1	46	20	14	12	72	39	74	6th	R1	R4	R1(S)	League play-offs	SF	(Republic of Ireland) James Collins (18)	8,528
2013–14	Lge 1	46	19	9	18	63	59	66	8th	R1	R3	F(S)			(England) Nile Ranger (8) (England) Michael Smith (8) (France) Dany N'Guessan (8)	8,130
2014–15	Lge 1	46	23	10	13	76	57	79	4th	R1	R2	R2(S)	League play-offs	RU	(England) Andy Williams (22)	8,130
2015–16	Lge 1	46	16	11	19	64	71	59	15th	R1	R1	R2(S)			(England) Nicky Ajose (25)	
2016–17	Lge 1 ↓	46	11	11	24	44	66	44	22nd	R1	R1	R2			(England) Jonathan Obika (6) (England) Luke Norris (6)	6,527
2017–18	Lge 2	46	20	8	18	67	65	68	9th	R2	R1	R2			(England) Luke Norris (14)	6,436
2018–19	Lge 2	46	16	16	14	59	56	64	13th	R2	R1	GS			(Wales) Michael Doughty (14)	6,390
2019–20	Lge 2 ↑	36	21	6	9	62	39	69	1st (Note: The 2019–20 season was curtailed due to the COVID-19 pandemic, with league positions decided on a points-per-game basis. Swindon Town averaged 1.92 points from 36 games.)	R1	R1	GS			(Republic of Ireland) Eoin Doyle (25)	7,787
2020–21	Lge 1 ↓	46	13	4	29	55	89	43	23rd	R1	R1	GS			(Jersey) Brett Pitman (12)	2,000 (Note: Most of Swindon Town's home games in the 2020–21 season were played behind closed doors due to the COVID-19 pandemic. Two home games against Fleetwood Town and Charlton Athletic were limited to 2,000 spectators.)
2021–22	Lge 2	46	22	11	13	77	54	77	6th (Note: Swindon lost to Port Vale 6-5 on penalties after drawing 2-2 on aggregate in the Play-Off Semi Finals)	R3	R1	L32			(England) Harry McKirdy (23)	9,790
2022–23	Lge 2	46	16	13	17	61	55	61	10th	R1	R1	GS	Wiltshire Cup	RU	(Wales) Jonny Williams (10)	9,063
2023–24	Lge 2	46	14	12	20	77	83	54	19th	R1	R1	GS	Wiltshire Cup		(England) Jake Young (16) (England) Dan Kemp (16)	8,800
2024–25	Lge 2	46	15	17	14	71	63	63	12th	R2	R1	L16			(England) Harry Smith (15)	7,229

== Key ==
- P – Played
- W – Games won
- D – Games drawn
- L – Games lost
- GF – Goals for
- GA – Goals against
- Pts – Points
- Pos – Final position
- Prem – Premier League
- Champ – EFL Championship
- Lge 1 – EFL League One
- Lge 2 – EFL League Two
- Div 1 – Football League First Division
- Div 2 – Football League Second Division
- Div 3 – Football League Third Division
- Div 3(S) – Football League Third Division South
- Div 4 – Football League Fourth Division
- SL Div1 – Southern League Division One
- WFL – Western Football League
- UL – United League
- n/a – Not applicable
- QR – Qualifying round
- IR – Intermediate round
- GS – Group stage
- R1 – First round
- R2 – Second round
- R3 – Third round
- R4 – Fourth round
- R5 – Fifth round
- QF – Quarter-finals
- SF – Semi-finals
- RU – Runners-up
- W – Winners
- (S) – Southern section of regionalised stage

Champions	Runners-up	Promoted ↑	Relegated ↓

== Overall ==
- Seasons spent at Level 1 of the football league system: 1
- Seasons spent at Level 2 of the football league system: 19
- Seasons spent at Level 3 of the football league system: 64
- Seasons spent at Level 4 of the football league system: 8
- Seasons spent at Level 5 of the football league system: 0
