= Alan Young (disambiguation) =

Alan Young (1919–2016) was an English-American actor.

Alan, Allan, Allen or Allyn Young may also refer to:

- Alan Young (lawyer) (1955–2024), Canadian law professor
- Alan Young (Scottish footballer) (born 1955), Scottish footballer
- Alan Young (Australian footballer) (born 1933), Australian footballer for Collingwood
- Alan Young (English footballer) (born 1983), football midfielder for Swindon Town
- Allan Young (1941–2009), English footballer
- Allan Young (cricketer) (1920–1974), Australian cricketer
- Allen Young (1827–1915), English master mariner and explorer
- Allen Young (writer) (born 1941), American journalist, author and editor
- Allen M. Young, American entomologist
- Allyn Abbott Young (1876–1929), economist

== See also ==
- Al Young (disambiguation)
