= Alfred Young =

Alfred Young may refer to:

- Alfred Young (mathematician) (1873–1940), British mathematician
- Alfred Young (artist) (born 1936), English conceptual and visual artist
- Alfred F. Young (1925–2012), American historian
- Alfred Karney Young (1864–1942), British barrister, judge, and cricketer
- Alf Young (1905–1977), English football manager and footballer for Huddersfield Town
- Alf Young (footballer, born 1900) (1900–1975), English footballer of the 1920s
- Al Young (dragster driver) (1946–2022), American former drag racer

== See also ==
- Al Young (disambiguation)
