= Al Young (disambiguation) =

Al Young (1939–2021) was an American writer.

Al Young may also refer to:

- Al Young (wide receiver) (born 1949), gridiron football wide receiver
- Al Young (dragster driver) (born 1946), former drag racer
- Al Young (politician) (born 1942), American politician in Oregon
- Alfred F. Young (1925–2012), American historian

== See also ==
- Albert Young (disambiguation)
- Alfred Young (disambiguation)
- Alan Young (disambiguation)
