= Adam Willis =

Adam Willis may refer to:

- Adam Willis (footballer) (born 1976), English former footballer
- Adam Willis (set decorator), American film and TV interior designer
- Adam Willis (Neighbours), a fictional character from the Australian soap opera
