= Robin Hulbert =

English footballer

Personal information
- Full name: Robin James Hulbert
- Date of birth: 14 March 1980 (age 46)
- Place of birth: Plymouth, England
- Height: 5 ft 9 in (1.75 m)
- Position: Midfielder

Youth career
- –1996: Everton
- 1996–1997: Swindon Town

Senior career*
Years	Team	Apps	(Gls)
1997–2000	Swindon Town	29	(0)
1998	→ Newcastle United (loan)	0	(0)
2000–2003	Bristol City	39	(0)
2003	→ Shrewsbury Town (loan)	7	(0)
2003–2004	Telford United	22	(1)
2004–2008	Port Vale	67	(1)
2008–2009	Darlington	27	(2)
2009–2012	Barrow	65	(0)
2012–2013	Worcester City	1	(0)
2013	Barrow	3	(0)
Total		256	(4)

International career
1997–1998	England U18	2	(0)
- * Club domestic league appearances and goals

Robin James Hulbert (born 14 March 1980) is an English former footballer who played as a midfielder. He played 297 games in a 17-year career in the Football League and Conference.

Signing professional forms with Swindon Town in 1996, he spent four years with the club, also spending a brief time on loan at Newcastle United in 1998. Joining Bristol City in 2000, he moved on to Telford United in 2003, following a loan spell at Shrewsbury Town. He transferred to Port Vale in 2004 and stayed with the club for the next four injury-blighted years. Spending the 2008–09 season with Darlington, he moved on to Barrow in 2009. He stayed for three seasons and again struggled with injuries. He had a brief spell with Worcester City before returning to Barrow in August 2013.

== Career ==
Born in Plymouth, Hulbert started his career with Everton. In August 1996, he was signed by First Division Swindon Town on the agreement that Swindon would pay the "Toffees" £25,000 for every 30 games Hulbert played. He made his senior debut for the club on 25 September 1996, making a substitute appearance in a 3–1 win over Queens Park Rangers in the League Cup. He made his league debut on 18 October 1997, in a 3–1 defeat at Wolverhampton Wanderers, replacing Scott Leitch on 37 minutes. His next appearance was in a 1–1 draw with Port Vale at The County Ground on 29 August 1998, as he won his first start. He made 17 appearances in 1998–99. After 13 games in 1999–2000, he was sold to Bristol City in March 2000 for a £25,000 fee.

In his first full season with City, he made just 21 appearances, having struggled to overcome a groin injury. He went on to have a quiet 2001–02, making just 16 appearances in all competitions. In April 2003, he was loaned out to Third Division Shrewsbury Town. Overall in 2002–03 he made seven appearances for the "Shrews" and ten appearances for City. Placed on the transfer list by boss Danny Wilson in August 2003, he left for Conference side Telford United on a free transfer three months later. He scored his first competitive goal whilst at Telford, bagging the only goal of the game against Dagenham & Redbridge on 29 November. He went on to play 22 games for Telford in 2003–04, before the club folded in the summer.

His return to the Football League came in July 2004, when he signed with Port Vale in League One, following a trial period. He played 27 times in his maiden season as a "Valiant", missing the last two months with a thigh problem. Due to a broken foot, he played just one game in 2005–06, turning up for a defeat at home to Hartlepool United on 29 October. Nevertheless, he was offered a six-month contract at the end of the season, having proved his fitness to the management team. He returned to action in 2006–07, scoring one goal – against Crewe Alexandra – in twenty games. He was offered a new one-year contract at the end of the campaign; manager Martin Foyle and his assistant Dean Glover both felt that Hulbert had "a lot to offer the team", and that "he dictates and he puts his foot in for us but he can also play and retain the ball". He made only 24 appearances in 2007–08, having suffered a broken collarbone in mid-season, and was not retained beyond the end of the season.

He signed with Darlington in August 2008, but started only 13 of his 33 games for the League Two side throughout the 2008–09 campaign. In June 2009, Hulbert signed a two-year contract with Conference National side Barrow. After 37 league appearances, at the end of the season he played at Wembley Stadium in the FA Trophy final victory over Stevenage Borough. During the game he was sent off for a challenge on striker Charlie Griffin at the end of normal time, in which he led into the challenge with his elbow, knocking out Griffin. Hulbert stated leading with elbows is "just a part of his game" – leaving Griffin needing stitches around his left eye, a broken nose and broken cheekbone. Barrow manager Darren Sheridan defended Hulbert on Radio 5 Live, saying "he's not that sort of player". He was restricted to twenty appearances in 2010–11 due to suspension and a groin injury. At the end of the campaign he signed up for the 2011–12 season. However, he picked up a cruciate ligament injury in his knee in October 2011, and was ruled out for the rest of the season; a despondent Hulbert said "I feel I have let the managers and supporters down with the injury." In February he began helping out manager David Bayliss following the departure of joint-manager Darren Sheridan.

In November 2012, he joined Worcester City. However, he played just 60 minutes of football for the "Dragons". He returned to Barrow on non-contract terms at the start of the 2013–14 season, following their relegation to the Conference North. Three games into the season he announced his retirement for a second time.

== Post-retirement ==
After his second and final retirement from football he founded the Sporting Stars Academy in Stoke-on-Trent with former teammate Shane Tudor.

== Career statistics ==
Appearances and goals by club, season and competition
Club	Season	League			FA Cup		League Cup		Other		Total	
Club	Season	Division	Apps	Goals	Apps	Goals	Apps	Goals	Apps	Goals	Apps	Goals
Swindon Town	1996–97	First Division	0	0	0	0	1	0	0	0	1	0
Swindon Town	1997–98	First Division	1	0	0	0	0	0	0	0	1	0
Swindon Town	1998–99	First Division	16	0	2	0	0	0	0	0	18	0
Swindon Town	1999–2000	First Division	12	0	0	0	1	0	0	0	13	0
Swindon Town	Total		29	0	2	0	2	0	0	0	33	0
Newcastle United (loan)	1997–98	Premier League	0	0	0	0	—		—		0	0
Bristol City	1999–2000	Second Division	2	0	—		—		—		2	0
Bristol City	2000–01	Second Division	19	0	0	0	2	0	0	0	21	0
Bristol City	2001–02	Second Division	11	0	0	0	0	0	5 (Note: Appearance(s) in the EFL Trophy.)	0	16	0
Bristol City	2002–03	Second Division	7	0	0	0	1	0	2	0	10	0
Bristol City	2003–04	Second Division	0	0	0	0	2	0	1	0	3	0
Bristol City	Total		39	0	0	0	5	0	8	0	52	0
Shrewsbury Town (loan)	2002–03	Third Division	7	0	—		—		—		7	0
Telford United	2003–04	Conference National	22	1	3	0	—		2 (Note: Appearance(s) in the FA Trophy.)	1	27	2
Port Vale	2004–05	League One	24	0	2	0	0	0	1	0	27	0
Port Vale	2005–06	League One	1	0	0	0	0	0	0	0	1	0
Port Vale	2006–07	League One	20	1	0	0	0	0	0	0	20	1
Port Vale	2007–08	League One	22	0	0	0	1	0	1	0	24	0
Port Vale	Total		67	1	2	0	1	0	2	0	72	1
Darlington	2008–09	League Two	27	2	2	0	2	0	2	0	33	2
Barrow	2009–10	Conference National	37	0	4	0	—		0	0	41	0
Barrow	2010–11	Conference National	20	0	0	0	—		0	0	20	0
Barrow	2011–12	Conference National	8	0	0	0	—		0	0	8	0
Barrow	Total		65	0	4	0	0	0	0	0	69	0
Worcester City	2012–13	Conference North	1	0	0	0	—		0	0	1	0
Barrow	2013–14	Conference North	3	0	0	0	—		0	0	3	0
Career total			260	4	13	0	10	0	14	1	297	5

== Honours ==
Barrow

- FA Trophy: 2010
