= Steve Mildenhall =

English footballer (born 1978)

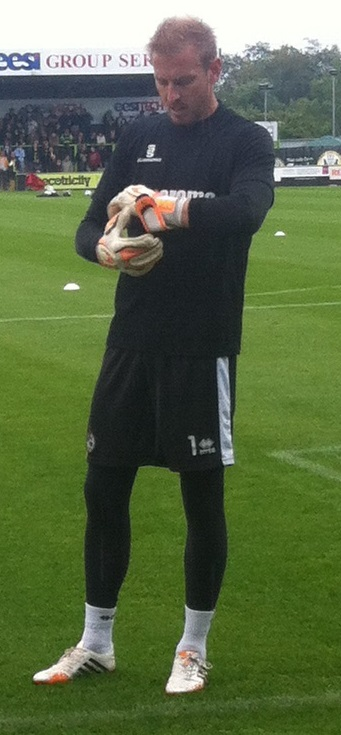
- Mildenhall playing for Bristol Rovers, 2014

Personal information
- Full name: Stephen James Mildenhall
- Date of birth: 13 May 1978 (age 48)
- Place of birth: Swindon, Wiltshire, England
- Height: 6 ft 6 in (1.98 m)
- Position: Goalkeeper

Team information
- Current team: Swindon Town (goalkeeping coach)

Senior career*
Years	Team	Apps	(Gls)
1995–2001	Swindon Town	33	(0)
1996	→ Gloucester City (loan)		
1997	→ Salisbury City (loan)		
2001–2004	Notts County	76	(0)
2004–2005	Oldham Athletic	6	(0)
2005–2006	Grimsby Town	46	(0)
2006–2008	Yeovil Town	75	(0)
2008–2010	Southend United	78	(0)
2010–2013	Millwall	10	(0)
2012	→ Scunthorpe United (loan)	9	(0)
2013	→ Bristol Rovers (loan)	22	(0)
2013–2017	Bristol Rovers	105	(0)
2022	Swindon Town	0	(0)
Total		460	(0)

Managerial career
- 2023: Swindon Town (joint-interim)
- 2023: Swindon Town (joint-interim)
- * Club domestic league appearances and goals

Stephen James Mildenhall (born 13 May 1978) is an English former professional footballer who is goalkeeping coach at Swindon Town.

As a player he was a goalkeeper, he made almost 500 appearances in the Football League and over 500 games in total including cup games between 1995 and 2017. He began his career at Swindon Town youth academy and was added to the club's first team in 1995. While with Swindon he was loaned out to non-league sides Gloucester City and Salisbury City before moving on to Notts County in 2001, Oldham Athletic in 2004 and Grimsby Town a year later. In 2006, he signed with Yeovil Town where he spent two years before signing with Southend United in 2008 and Millwall in 2010. In May 2013, he signed for Bristol Rovers where he remained for four years.

== Playing career ==
=== Early career ===
Mildenhall's professional career started at Swindon Town where he made 38 appearances, including one as a centre forward away at Tranmere Rovers. While at Swindon he was named young player and player of the year before securing a £150,000 transfer to Notts County. Mildenhall played 91 games for the Magpies, scoring one goal (a free-kick against Mansfield Town in a League Cup tie) which later appeared as a 'What happened next' slot on an episode of A Question of Sport. A falling out with manager Gary Mills prompted a move to Oldham Athletic in December 2004. He made six appearances for the club before breaking his finger, and he subsequently lost his place in the team.

=== Grimsby Town ===
In the summer of 2005, Mildenhall moved to Grimsby Town replacing Anthony Williams as the club's number 1 keeper, and was ever present in his only season at Blundell Park. During the season Grimsby and Mildenhall notched up a mini run in the League Cup by defeating Derby County and Tottenham Hotspur. Grimsby had remained in the automatic promotion places in League Two for the majority of the seasons but fell into the play-off places with two games remaining, meaning they would have to face local rivals Lincoln City in the semi-final. The Mariners secured a 3–1 aggregate victory but failed to achieve promotion after being defeated in the League Two play-off final at the Millennium Stadium by Cheltenham Town. This would eventually spell the end for manager Russell Slade who rejected a new contract and decided leave the club for Yeovil Town taking both Mildenhall and Jean-Paul Kalala with him.

=== Yeovil Town ===
During his time at The Glovers Mildenhall established himself as the club's first choice keeper and became popular among their fans being named player of the year as the side reached the 2006–07 League One play-off final at Wembley which they lost to Blackpool However, his second season at Yeovil was disturbed through injury. In mid-September he injured a muscle around his hip against Leyton Orient, which saw him out of action for more than a month. On his return to the first team in late October he was unable to help Yeovil as they succumbed to a 2–1 home defeat to Swansea City and Mildenhall was on the sidelines again after injuring his knee ligaments after a clash with Tommy Mooney in the 2–0 away defeat to Walsall in early February. Mildenhall was voted BBC south-west footballer of the year for 2007.

=== Southend United ===
It was announced on 6 June 2008 that he signed a 3-year contract at Southend United. Mildenhall put in a man of the match performance in Southend United's third round FA cup game against Chelsea at Stamford Bridge with a string of fine saves including a stunning save in the fourth minute of added time to keep out Franco Di Santo's header.

Mildenhall made 89 appearances for Southend United in all competitions.

=== Millwall ===
On 13 July 2010, Mildenhall had his contract cancelled by mutual consent and signed a 12-month contract with Championship side Millwall the same day. He signed a new 2-year contract in the summer of 2011 which keeps him at the club until the end of the 2013 season. To date Mildenhall has made over 400 appearances in all competitions. He made his league debut for Millwall on 20 August 2011, in an away defeat to Southampton.

On 5 November 2012, Mildenhall signed for Scunthorpe United on loan until 8 December 2012 after the home game against AFC Bournemouth.

=== Bristol Rovers ===
On 31 December 2012 Mildenhall was loaned out to Bristol Rovers and was given the number 13 shirt. He made his debut for Rovers on 1 January 2013 against Plymouth Argyle in a 2–1 victory, playing the full 90 minutes and went on to appear in all but one of Bristol Rovers' remaining games during the 2012–13 season, keeping seven clean sheets and helping the club steer well clear of relegation.

On 30 May 2013, it was announced that Mildenhall had agreed a two-year deal to join Bristol Rovers on a permanent basis, with the option of a further year.

On 3 May 2014, Mildenhall played the duration of a 1–0 home defeat to Mansfield Town, Colin Daniel's first-half goal condemning Rovers to relegation out of the Football League for the first time in 94 years. Mildenhall remained at the club for the 2014–15 season, battling for the number one shirt with Will Puddy. On 17 May 2015, Mildenhall replaced Puddy in the 121st minute of the play-off final for the subsequent penalty shoot-out after a 1–1 draw with Grimsby Town. Although he did not save a penalty, Jon-Paul Pittman's miss meant that Rovers returned to the Football League at the first time of asking. Back-to-back promotions was achieved the following season with a 92nd-minute winner from Lee Brown in the final match securing Rovers a third-placed position and automatic promotion.

Having played his last game for Rovers in the 3–2 defeat to Chelsea in the EFL Cup, he retired at the end of the 2016–17 season and stayed at the club to become a goalkeeper coach with the first team and U23 team.

== Coaching career ==
On 24 July 2018, he returned to home-town club Swindon Town as the goalkeeper coach following the departure of Dean Thornton to the Chinese Taipei national team.

On 7 January 2022, due to a goalkeeping shortage, Mildenhall was named as substitute for Swindon's 4–1 defeat against Premier League side Manchester City in the FA Cup.

In 2023, he was appointed joint-interim head coach, alongside Gavin Gunning, after Scott Lindsey left Swindon Town for Crawley Town. He and Gunning were appointed again for the final match of the season following the sacking of Jody Morris.

== Career statistics ==
Appearances and goals by club, season and competition
Club	Season	League			FA Cup		League Cup		Other		Total	
Club	Season	Division	Apps	Goals	Apps	Goals	Apps	Goals	Apps	Goals	Apps	Goals
Swindon Town	1995–96	Second Division	0	0	0	0	2	0	0	0	2	0
Swindon Town	1996–97	First Division	1	0	0	0	0	0	—		1	0
Swindon Town	1997–98	First Division	4	0	0	0	0	0	—		4	0
Swindon Town	1998–99	First Division	0	0	0	0	0	0	—		0	0
Swindon Town	1999–2000	First Division	5	0	1	0	0	0	—		6	0
Swindon Town	2000–01	Second Division	23	0	1	0	0	0	1 (Note: Appearance(s) in Football League Trophy)	0	25	0
Swindon Town	Total		33	0	2	0	2	0	1	0	38	0
Notts County	2001–02	Second Division	26	0	3	0	2	1	1	0	32	1
Notts County	2002–03	Second Division	21	0	0	0	0	0	1	0	22	0
Notts County	2003–04	Second Division	28	0	3	0	3	0	1	0	35	0
Notts County	2004–05	League Two	1	0	0	0	0	0	0	0	1	0
Notts County	Total		76	0	6	0	5	1	3	0	90	1
Oldham Athletic	2004–05	League One	6	0	0	0	0	0	0	0	6	0
Grimsby Town	2005–06	League Two	46	0	1	0	3	0	4 (Note: One appearance in Football League Trophy, three appearances in League Two play-offs)	0	54	0
Yeovil Town	2006–07	League One	46	0	1	0	1	0	4 (Note: One appearance in Football League Trophy, three appearances in League One play-offs)	0	52	0
Yeovil Town	2007–08	League One	29	0	1	0	1	0	2	0	33	0
Yeovil Town	Total		75	0	2	0	2	0	6	0	85	0
Southend United	2008–09	League One	34	0	5	0	1	0	1	0	41	0
Southend United	2009–10	League One	44	0	1	0	2	0	1	0	48	0
Southend United	Total		78	0	6	0	3	0	2	0	89	0
Millwall	2010–11	Championship	0	0	0	0	0	0	—		0	0
Millwall	2011–12	Championship	10	0	2	0	3	0	—		15	0
Millwall	2012–13	Championship	0	0	0	0	0	0	—		0	0
Millwall	Total		10	0	2	0	3	0	—		15	0
Scunthorpe United (loan)	2012–13	League One	9	0	0	0	0	0	0	0	9	0
Bristol Rovers (loan)	2012–13	League Two	22	0	0	0	0	0	0	0	22	0
Bristol Rovers	2013–14	League Two	46	0	5	0	1	0	1	0	53	0
Bristol Rovers	2014–15	Conference Premier	29	0	2	0	—		1 (Note: Appearance in Conference Premier play-offs)	0	32	0
Bristol Rovers	2015–16	League Two	26	0	0	0	1	0	0	0	27	0
Bristol Rovers	2016–17	League One	4	0	0	0	2	0	0	0	6	0
Bristol Rovers	Total		105	0	7	0	4	0	2	0	118	0
Swindon Town	2021–22	League Two	0	0	0	0	0	0	0	0	0	0
Career total			460	0	24	0	22	1	18	0	524	1

== Honours ==
Bristol Rovers

- Football League Two third-placed promotion: 2015–16
- National League play-offs: 2015

Swindon Town

- EFL League Two: 2019–20

Individual

- BBC West Country Sports Personality of the Year: 2007
