= Alfred F. Young =

American historian (1925–2012)

- Al Young as he appeared in 1999
- Born: Alfred F. Young; January 17, 1925; New York City
- Died: November 6, 2012 (aged 87); Durham, North Carolina
- Education: Queens College (1946); Columbia University (1947); Northwestern University (1958)
- Occupations: Historian, writer
- Spouse: Marilyn Mills
- Writing career
- Period: 1958-2012
- Subject: social history of the American Revolution

Alfred Fabian "Al" Young (1925–2012) was an American historian. Young is regarded as a pioneer in the writing of the social history of the American Revolution and was a founding editor of the academic journal Labor: Studies in Working-Class History of the Americas.

== Biography ==
=== Early years ===
Alfred Fabian Young, known to family and friends as "Al," was born January 17, 1925, in New York City. He was the second son of Gerson Yungowitz, a Polish-born Jew who had grown up in London, and the former Fanny Denitzen, an East European émigré to America. The family surname was Americanized to Young after his father's arrival in America. His parents divorced when Al was a child and he was raised by his mother in suburban Jamaica, New York.

Young attended public schools, graduating from Jamaica High School in Jamaica, Queens at the age of 16, academically ranked 4th in his class of 400 students. He subsequently attended Queens College, from which he graduated in 1946 with a Bachelor of Arts degree in Economics. His experience at Queens College was important in his intellectual development as a budding social historian with an emphasis on the working class, as it was there that he studied under pioneer industrial historian Vera Shlakman as well as scholar of the Haymarket affair and biographer of Terence Powderly, Henry David.

Young went on to earn a master's degree from Columbia University in 1947, from whence he moved to Northwestern University near Chicago, where he began work on a PhD.

After three years of course work at Northwestern, Young took a series of teaching jobs at three eastern universities, while continuing to work on his dissertation in his spare time. He was ultimately awarded his PhD by Northwestern in 1958. His thesis title was "The Democratic-Republican movement in New York State, 1788-1797".

In 1952 Young married Marilyn Mills, with whom he ultimately raised three daughters.

=== Academic career ===
After working in a series of temporary positions, in 1964 Young was hired by Northern Illinois University to a tenure track position in the field of American history. He would continue to teach there for a quarter century before his retirement in 1989.

His first book, The Democratic Republicans of New York: The Origins, 1763-1797, was published in 1967 and won accolades from the Institute of Early American History and Culture, which awarded it its Jamestown Prize.

During the tumultuous era of the Vietnam War, Young emerged as an outspoken advocate of academic freedom and the defense of college professors with political views outside the mainstream from employment retaliation. He was the founder of the Committee on Academic Freedom in Illinois in 1968, an organization formed to halt the blacklisting of radical historian Staughton Lynd, and was active in the Committee on the Rights of Historians of the American Historical Association from its inception in 1971.

After his retirement from teaching, Young took a position as a Senior Scholar in Residence at the Newberry Library in Chicago. Freed from the constraints of the classroom, Young managed to increase his literary productivity, releasing several essays collections and expanding his influential 1981 article on colonial shoemaker George Roberts Twelves Hewes into book form as The Shoemaker and the Tea Party: Memory and the American Revolution (1999). He also published an important biography of a seldom-remembered colonial woman who assumed a male gender identity in order to fight in the Revolutionary War, Masquerade: The Live and Times of Deborah Sampson, Continental Soldier (2005).

In 2004, Young was a founding editor of the academic journal Labor: Studies in Working-Class History of the Americas, published today by Duke University Press.

=== Death and legacy ===
Al Young was stricken by his first heart attack in May 2012. His productive work as a working historian was thereby brought to an end.

Young died November 6, 2012, in Durham, North Carolina, following a second heart attack — this time fatal. He was 87 years old at the time of his death.

Young was remembered by his peers as a scholar of broad intellect with an exhaustive knowledge of his area of specialization. Historian Gregory Nobles, a collaborator with Young on a book project, recalled: "It’s hard to imagine anyone who knew the field better or cared more about really getting history right, especially about getting ordinary people — and their politics — into the picture."

Characterizing him as a "New Left historian before there was a New Left," historian Michael D. Hattem declared that "Young’s greatest historiographical legacy may be his commitment to the idea that everyday people were historical actors, and the fact that that hardly seems revolutionary or revelatory is largely because of Al Young."

== Works ==
=== Books ===
- The Democratic Republicans of New York: The Origins, 1763-1797. Chapel Hill, NC: University of North Carolina Press, 1967, ISBN 9780807838211.
- Dissent: Explorations in the History of American Radicalism. DeKalb, IL: Northern Illinois University Press, 1968, ISBN 9780875800073.
- Beyond the American Revolution: Explorations in the History of American Radicalism American Promise: A Compact History. DeKalb, IL: Northern Illinois University Press, 1993, ISBN 9780875801766.
- The Shoemaker and the Tea Party: Memory and the American Revolution. Boston: Beacon Press, 2000, ISBN 9780807071403.
- Masquerade: The Life and Times of Deborah Sampson, Continental Soldier. New York: Alfred A. Knopf, 2004, ISBN 9780679441656.
- Liberty Tree: Ordinary People and the American Revolution. New York: New York University Press, 2006, ISBN 9780814796856.
- Whose American Revolution Was It?: Historians Interpret the Founding. With Gregory H. Nobles. New York: New York University Press, 2011, ISBN 9780814797105.

=== Edited volumes ===
- The American Revolution: Explorations in the History of American Radicalism. Editor. DeKalb, IL: Northern Illinois University Press, 1976, ISBN 0875800572.
- We the People: Voices and Images of the New Nation. Editor, with Mary E. Janzen and Terry J. Fife. Philadelphia, PA: Temple University Press, 1992, ISBN 0877229376.
- Past Imperfect: Essays on History, Libraries, and the Humanities. Editor, with Lawrence W. Towner and Robert W. Karrow Jr. Chicago: University of Chicago Press, 1993, ISBN 0226810429.
- Revolutionary Founders: Rebels, Radicals, and Reformers in the Making of the Nation. Editor, with Gary B. Nash and Ralph Raphael. New York : Alfred A. Knopf, 2011, ISBN 9780307271105.

=== Journal articles ===
- "George Roberts Twelves Hewes (1742–1840): A Boston Shoemaker and the Memory of the American Revolution," William and Mary Quarterly, vol. 38, no. 4 (Oct. 1981), pp. 561–623. JSTOR 1918907
- "An Outsider and the Progress of a Career in History," William and Mary Quarterly, vol. 52, no. 3 (July 1995), pp. 499–512. JSTOR 2947305
