= Bryan Smith (footballer) =

Scottish footballer

Personal information
- Full name: Bryan Smith
- Date of birth: 21 August 1970 (age 56)
- Place of birth: Clydebank, Scotland
- Height: 5 ft 10 in (1.78 m)
- Position: Defender

Senior career*
Years	Team	Apps	(Gls)
1989–1993	Clydebank	39	(0)
1998–2003	Clyde	126	(0)
Total		165	(0)
- * Club domestic league appearances and goals

Bryan Smith (born 21 August 1970) is a Scottish former footballer. He was a defender.

Smith began his career with hometown team Clydebank. He made 44 appearances for the Bankies, before signing for junior side Shettleston. He returned to the senior game in 1998, being one of eleven junior players to sign for Clyde. He spent five and a half years at Clyde, before leaving in January 2003 to join Maryhill. He made 149 appearances in all competitions with Clyde, but failed to score a goal.
