= Allen M. Young =

American entomologist

- Education: State University of New York at New Paltz (BA); University of Chicago (PhD)
- Known for: Tropical rainforest insects, invertebrate cacao pollination
- Scientific career
- Fields: Tropical entomology
- Workplaces: Milwaukee Public Museum

Allen M. Young is an American entomologist. He is a curator emeritus and vice president of collections, research, and public programs at the Milwaukee Public Museum. He was named a Fellow of the Wisconsin Academy of Sciences, Arts & Letters in 2002, and has published both works of popular science within natural history and over 300 scientific articles. His research focuses on tropical insect ecology, with particular interest in the pollination of cacao.

== Selected publications ==
- Young, Allen M. The Chocolate Tree: a Natural History of Cacao. Smithsonian Institution Press, 1994.
- Young, Allen M. Small Creatures and Ordinary Places. University of Wisconsin Press, 2000.
