= Alan Young (Australian footballer) =

Australian rules footballer

Personal information
- Full name: Alan Young
- Born: 8 December 1933 (age 92)
- Original team: Ararat
- Height: 183 cm (6 ft 0 in)
- Weight: 80 kg (176 lb)

Playing career^{1}
| Years | Club | Games (Goals) |
| 1954 | Collingwood | 3 (1) |
- ^{1} Playing statistics correct to the end of 1954.

Alan Young is a former Australian rules footballer who played for the Collingwood Football Club in the Victorian Football League (VFL).
