= Vera Shlakman =

Canadian-born American economist

- Born: July 15, 1909; Montreal
- Died: November 5, 2017 (aged 108); New York City
- Occupations: Economist, professor
- Years active: 1935–1978
- Known for: Firing by Queens College for alleged Communist membership
- Title: Professor Emerita, Columbia University School of Social Work

Academic background
- Education: McGill University
- Alma mater: Columbia University
- Thesis: An Analysis of Female Factory Workers in 19th-Century Chicopee, Massachusetts (circa 1935)

Academic work
- Discipline: Economics
- Sub-discipline: Labor
- Notable works: Economic History of a Factory Town (1935) (1969)

Vera Shlakman (July 15, 1909 – November 5, 2017) was a 20th-century American professor of Economics and Marxism and author of a 1935 book on women factory workers. She was best known in 1952 for her firing by Queens College for refusing to testify to the McCarran Committee whether she was a card-carrying Communist, as well as for apology and restitution she received in 1982.

== Background ==
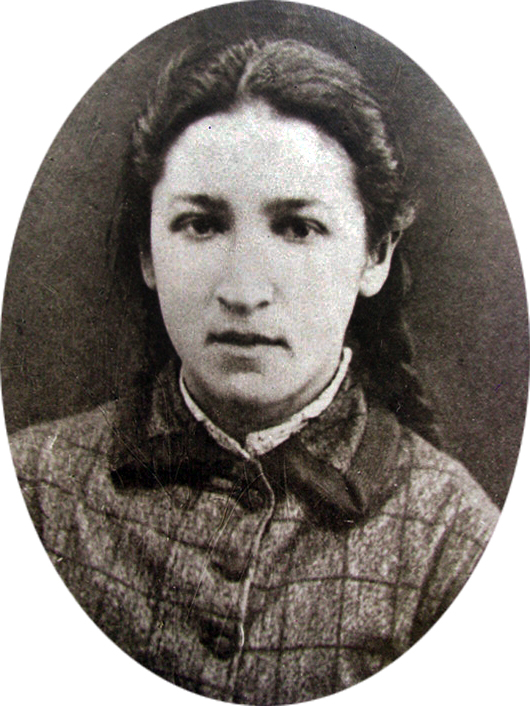
Vera Zasulich, Shlakman's namesake

Vera Shlakman was born on July 15, 1909, in Montreal, Canada. Her parents, Louis Shlakman (tailor, garment foreman) and Lena Hendler, were Jewish immigrants from Eastern Europe. They named their children for revolutionary heroes: Vera for Vera Zasulich, Eleanora for Karl Marx's daughter Eleanor Marx, and Victor for Victor Hugo. Anarchist Emma Goldman was a family friend.

In 1930, she received bachelor's degree from McGill University, followed by an MA in economics. She received a doctorate in economics at Columbia University. Her doctoral dissertation analyzed women factory workers in the 1800s in Chicopee, Massachusetts.

== Career ==
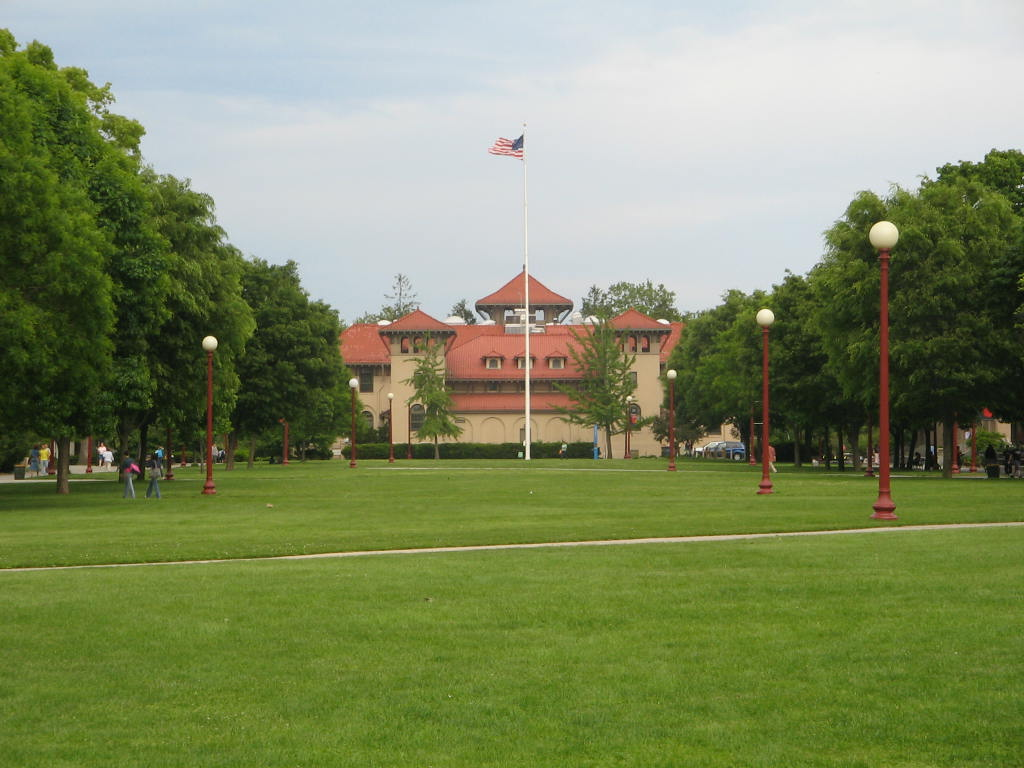
The QC Quad at Queens College, where Shlakman taught

Shlakman obtained a research fellowship at Smith College and then taught briefly at Sweet Briar College.

In 1938, Shlakman became an instructor at Queens College, where she taught about labor, Social Security, and concentration of wealth.

Shlakman was vice president of the college division of a Teachers Union local, rebuked for Communists domination. Anti-Semitism provides background to Shlakman's career as the New York City Board of Education, state officials, and courts specifically targeted left-wing Jewish teachers and professors to fire as part of their Communist purge.

=== Hearings, firing ===
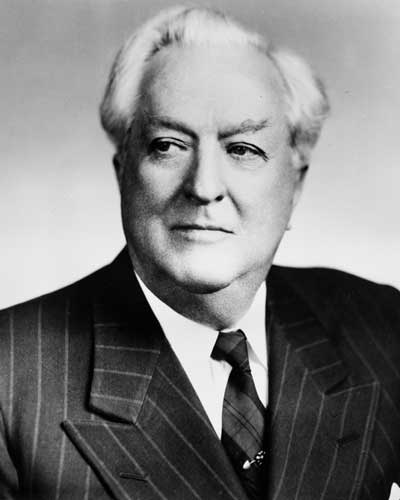
Pat McCarran (1947), before whose committee Shlakman pled the First and Fifth amendments in 1952

On September 24, 1952, during testimony at a public hearing of the United States Senate Internal Security Subcommittee, led by Senator Pat McCarran, Shlakman pled the First and Fifth amendments with regard to any membership in the Communist Party.

In October 1952, she was fired under two New York State regulations. The first (the Feinberg Law, authorized in 1949) barred subversive organization ties and, the other (New York City Charter Section 903) against corruption, provided that refusing testimony on official conduct, because of self-incrimination, was evidence for dismissal (by the late 1960s, both provisions were declared unconstitutional).

=== Later life ===
Shlakman's firing by Queens College "banished her to academic obscurity" at the time. She never taught Economics again at Queens College.

For the rest of the 1950s, Shlakman worked as a secretary, a bookkeeper, and occasional teacher. In 1960, Dr. Shlakman started to teach again at Adelphi University's School of Social Work. In 1966, she became a full-time professor at Columbia University School of Social Work. She retired as professor emerita in 1978. Dr. Shlakman's enduring connection to Columbia's School of Social Work led her to establish a scholarship, and to leave a bequest to the School in her will.

=== Restitution ===
In 1980, City University offered an apology to professors dismissed then, including Shlakman. "They were dismissed during and in the spirit of the shameful era of McCarthyism, during which the freedoms traditionally associated with academic institutions were quashed," the trustees of the City University of New York declared in a unanimous resolution.

Shlakman and Oscar Shaftel filed an appeal to New York City Comptroller Harrison J. Goldin over pensions or death benefits for former professors dismissed during the Second Red Scare. In April 1982, the City announced a $935,098 settlement with seven living and three deceased former professors: Dr. Shlakman received $114,599. Besides Shlakman and Shaftel, the other professors were: Richard Austin, Joseph Bressler, Dudley Straus, Sarah Reidman Gustafson, and Bernard F. Riess.

== Personal life and death ==
Shlakman never married.

Scholar Marjorie Heins has assessed that Shlakman was a socialist-anarchist but not necessarily a communist.

Shlakman believed that fears of "communism" fell prone to exaggeration. For example, "When the United States Post Office began to carry packages, this activity was viewed as a challenge to private enterprise ... and a kind of socialistic or communistic activity" but not for long.

Regarding her firing, she held that the academic community had a choice not to fire her but chose to do so. She questioned: "Is the dismissal of teachers easier to accept than the burning of books?"

In her last years, she became homebound due to blindness. Friends who looked after her included Ellen J. Holahan, Judith Podore Ward, and Bernard Tuchman. According to her friends, she never revealed whether she had been a Party member.

Shlakman died aged 108 on November 5, 2017, at home in Manhattan. Her friend Ellen J. Holahan reported the death.

== Legacy ==
Sam Roberts of The New York Times commented at her death, "A 42-year-old assistant professor when she was fired in 1952, Dr. Shlakman neither taught economics again nor wrote a sequel to her groundbreaking 1935 book on female factory workers."

In the introduction to her 2013 book Priests of Our Democracy, Marjorie Heins asks the question "Why did Vera Shlakman, Oscar Shaftel, and hundreds of others refuse to cooperate in the political inquisitions of the witch-hunt era?" She answers, "Many people who had made the difficult break with communism, or who had never been communists, simply did not want to collaborate in the Red hunt."

== Works ==
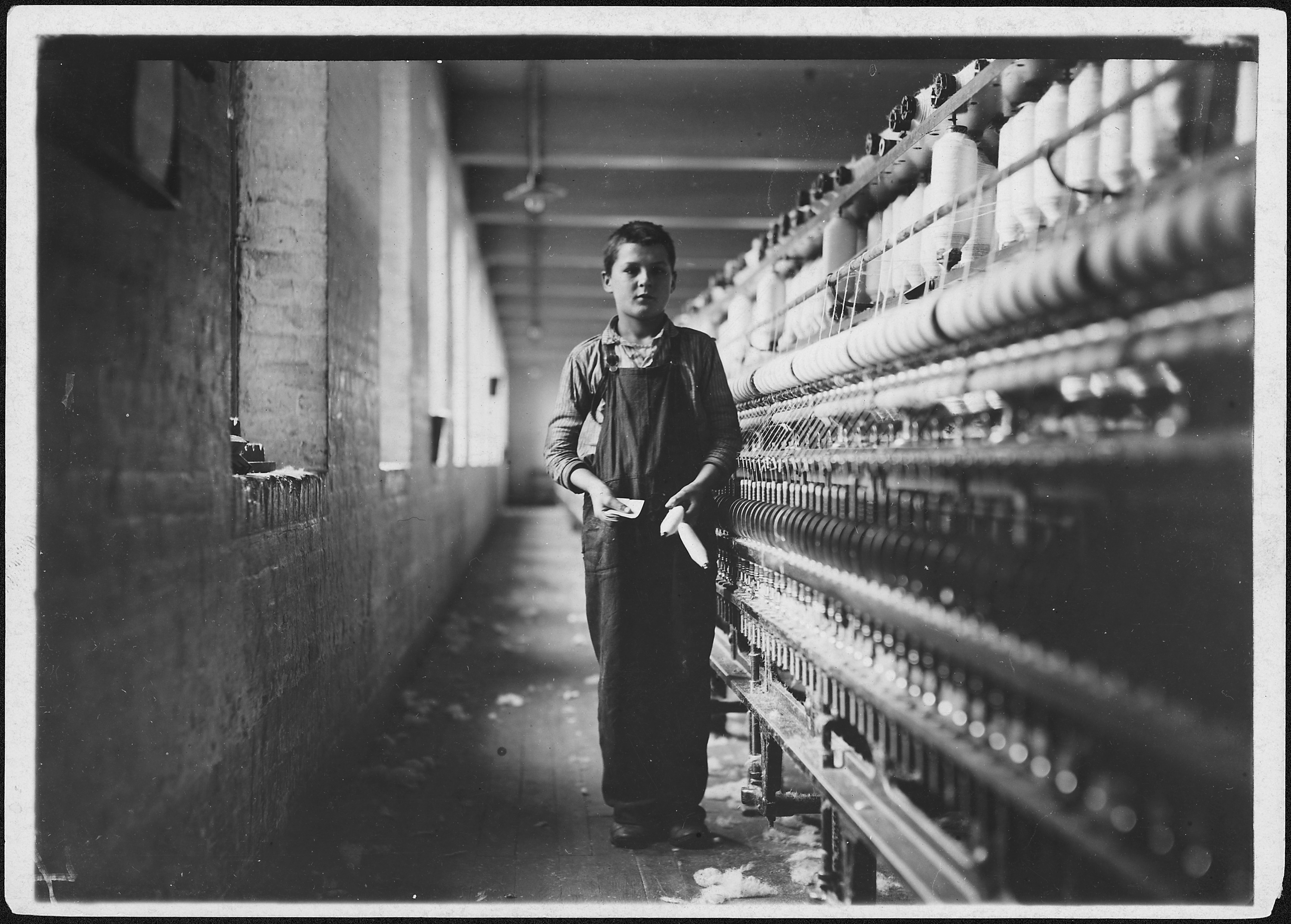
Child laborer (1911) photo by Lewis Hine, in Chicopee, Massachusetts, real-life setting for Shlakman's book

Shlakman published only one major book, of which historian Alice Kessler-Harris of Columbia University later wrote:

Vera Shlakman had an extraordinary effect on my work and on that of a generation of labor historians. Quietly, unobtrusively her interpretive insights and the methodological innovations she introduced paved the way to a more eclectic and integrated discipline. A full seventy years after its publication in 1935, her Economic History of a Factory Town: A Study of Chicopee, Massachusetts still provides an intellectual and conceptual guide, not only to a changing field, but to the persistent questions it raises. because her book 'raised the question of how a transformation in the meaning of work for female workers could, and perhaps did, alter the workplace environment and the nature of family life.'

In 2017, Kessler-Harris added that Shlakman's study of Chicopee confirmed that fundamental problems between capital and labor and thus that labor protests were a reaction to capitalist excesses. In 2017, historian Joshua B. Freeman of Queens College praised Shlakman's 1935 book because it "extended the boundaries of American working-class history" and influenced a generation of historians."

- Economic History of a Factory Town: A Study of Chicopee, Massachusetts (1935) (1969)
