= Danny Invincibile =

Australian soccer player

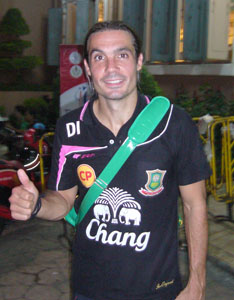
- Invincibile at Army United in 2012

Personal information
- Full name: Daniele Invincibile
- Date of birth: 31 March 1979 (age 47)
- Place of birth: Brisbane, Australia
- Height: 1.83 m (6 ft 0 in)
- Positions: Attacking midfielder; right winger; forward

Team information
- Current team: Bangkok United (sports director)

Youth career
- 1996: QAS

Senior career*
Years	Team	Apps	(Gls)
1997–1998	Brisbane Strikers	5	(1)
1998–2000	Marconi Stallions	39	(2)
2000–2003	Swindon Town	128	(22)
2003–2011	Kilmarnock	199	(32)
2011	St Johnstone	10	(1)
2011–2012	Ermis Aradippou	9	(0)
2012–2013	Army United	11	(2)
Total		391	(57)

International career
1998–1999	Australia U20	7	(0)

Managerial career
- 2020–2022: Bangkok United B
- 2020: Bangkok United (interim)
- 2022–2023: Samut Prakan FC
- 2023–2024: Ayutthaya United
- 2024–2026: Bangkok United (academy manager)
- 2026–: Bangkok United (sports director)
Medal record
Representing Australia
Men's Association football
OFC U-20 Championship
Winner	1998 Samoa
- * Club domestic league appearances and goals

Daniele Invincibile (born 31 March 1979) is a football manager and former player who is the sports director and interim head coach of Thai League 1 club Bangkok United.

== Club career ==
Born in Brisbane, Invincibile attended Payne Road Primary School, Brisbane, Australia. His clubs in Australia included The Gap, Taringa Rovers, Brisbane Strikers and the Marconi Stallions. He was selected in the Australian under-20s team and was a member of the Queensland Academy of Sport.

=== Swindon Town ===
Invincibile joined Swindon Town on 29 July 2000 after being spotted by manager Colin Todd while playing in a trial match alongside Gary Alexander for West Ham United. In April 2001, his injury-time winner against Peterborough United effectively saved Swindon from relegation in the 2000–01 season. He scored 25 goals in league and cup competitions while at the club.

=== Kilmarnock ===
On 24 July 2003, Invincibile was signed as a free agent by Jim Jefferies on a one-year deal. He was troubled by injuries in his first season, but went on to make 21 appearances and score five goals. He played the roles of winger or striker, and wore the number 11 shirt.

In April 2006, Invincibile turned down the chance to return to the Australian National League by refusing an offer from A-League team Melbourne Victory.

In November 2006, he helped Kilmarnock into the semi-finals of the CIS Insurance League Cup by curling home the winner in a 3–2 victory over Motherwell.

In the final league match of the 2008–09 season, Invincibile scored the opening goal for Kilmarnock in the away match against Motherwell, and he finished with 8 goals for the season

On 31 January 2011, it was reported that Kilmarnock had released Invincibile from his contract.

=== St Johnstone ===
On 25 February 2011, he joined St Johnstone on a short-term contract.

=== Army United ===
In January 2012, he joined Thai Premier League team Army United.

== International career ==
On 26 August 2009, Invincibile was named in the Australian squad for a friendly against South Korea, which was played on 5 September in Seoul, South Korea.

== Career statistics ==
As of 30 April 2011

Club performance			League		Cup		League Cup		Total	
Season	Club	League	Apps	Goals	Apps	Goals	Apps	Goals	Apps	Goals
Australia			League		Cup		League Cup		Total	
1997–98	Brisbane Strikers	National Soccer League	5	1	-		-		5	1
1998–99	Marconi Stallions	National Soccer League	7	0	-		-		7	0
1999–2000	Marconi Stallions	National Soccer League	32	2	-		-		32	2
England			League		FA Cup		League Cup		Total	
2000–01	Swindon Town	Second Division	42	9	3	0	2	1	47	10
2001–02	Swindon Town	Second Division	44	6	3	2	2	0	49	8
2002–03	Swindon Town	Second Division	42	7	2	0	-		44	7
Scotland			League		Scottish Cup		League Cup		Total	
2003–04	Kilmarnock	Premier League	22	5	2	0	-		24	5
2004–05	Kilmarnock	Premier League	31	7	3	0	2	2	36	9
2005–06	Kilmarnock	Premier League	37	7	-		2	1	39	8
2006–07	Kilmarnock	Premier League	25	2	1	0	2	1	28	3
2007–08	Kilmarnock	Premier League	27	3	2	0	1	0	30	3
2008–09	Kilmarnock	Premier League	25	6	2	0	2	1	29	7
2009–10	Kilmarnock	Premier League	25	2	2	0	2	0	29	2
2010–11	Kilmarnock	Premier League	7	0	0	0	2	0	9	0
2010–11	St Johnstone	Premier League	9	0	3	1	0	0	12	1
Cyprus			League		Cypriot Cup		League Cup		Total	
2011–12	Ermis Aradippou	Cypriot First Division	9	0	?	?	-		9	0
2012	Army United	Thailand Premier League	0	0	0	0	0	0	0	0
2013	Army United	Thailand Premier League	0	0	0	0	0	0	0	0
Total	Australia		44	3	0	0	0	0	44	3
Total	England		128	22	8	2	4	1	140	25
Total	Scotland		208	32	15	1	13	5	236	38
Total	Cyprus		9	0	0	0	0	0	9	0
Career total			389	57	23	3	17	6	429	66

== Managerial statistics ==
As of 22 November 2026

Managerial record by team and tenure
Team	Nat.	From	To	Record					Ref.
Team	Nat.	From	To	G	W	D	L	Win %	Ref.
Bangkok United	(Thailand)	18 October 2020	5 November 2020	2	0	1	1	0.00	
Samut Prakan	(Thailand)	3 August 2022	2 August 2023	1	0	0	1	0.00	
Ayutthaya United	(Thailand)	3 August 2023	30 June 2024	36	17	9	10	47.22	
Bangkok United	(Thailand)	26 October 2026	present	3	3	0	0	100.00	
Career Total				42	20	10	12	47.62	

== Honours ==
Australia U-20

- OFC U-19 Men's Championship: 1998
