= Allan Young (cricketer) =

Australian cricketer

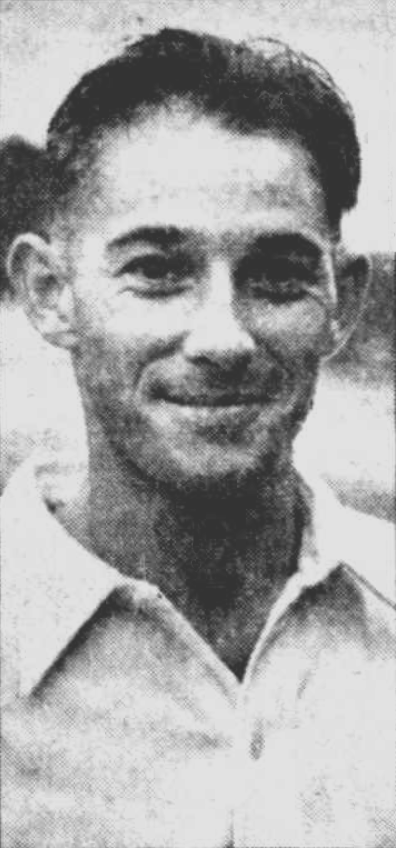

Personal information
- Full name: Allan Stanley Young
- Born: 7 July 1920; Ipswich, Queensland, Australia
- Died: 23 December 1974 (aged 54); Brisbane, Queensland, Australia
- Batting: Right-handed
- Bowling: Leg-break googly

Domestic team information
- Years: Team
- 1945/46–1949/50: Queensland
- Source: ESPNcricinfo, 8 December 2015

Allan Stanley Young (7 July 1920 – 23 December 1974) was an Australian cricketer. He was a right-handed batsman and leg-break, googly bowler. He played 23 first-class cricket matches for Queensland between 1945 and 1950, scoring 553 runs and taking 26 wickets.
