= Gary Alexander (footballer) =

English footballer (born 1979)

Personal information
- Full name: Gary George Alexander
- Date of birth: 15 August 1979 (age 47)
- Place of birth: Lambeth, London, England
- Height: 6 ft 0 in (1.83 m)
- Position: Striker

Team information
- Current team: Erith & Belvedere (manager)

Youth career
- –1998: West Ham United

Senior career*
Years	Team	Apps	(Gls)
1998–2000	West Ham United	0	(0)
1999–2000	→ Exeter City (loan)	37	(16)
2000–2001	Swindon Town	37	(7)
2001–2003	Hull City	68	(23)
2003–2007	Leyton Orient	179	(52)
2007–2010	Millwall	86	(19)
2010–2012	Brentford	62	(21)
2012	→ Crawley Town (loan)	14	(7)
2012–2014	Crawley Town	48	(8)
2013	→ AFC Wimbledon (loan)	18	(3)
2014	Burton Albion	11	(0)
2014–2018	Greenwich Borough	67	(34)
2018	Chatham Town	2	(1)
2018	Ashford United	1	(0)
Total		630	(191)

Managerial career
- 2013: Crawley Town (caretaker)
- 2015–2018: Greenwich Borough
- 2018: Ashford United
- 2019–2021: Glebe
- 2021–2022: Cray Wanderers
- 2026–: Erith & Belvedere
- * Club domestic league appearances and goals

Gary George Alexander (born 15 August 1979) is an English former professional footballer. He is currently manager of Erith & Belvedere.

Alexander previously played for West Ham United, Exeter City, Swindon Town, Hull City, Leyton Orient, Millwall, Brentford, Crawley Town, AFC Wimbledon and Burton Albion. He was also caretaker manager of Crawley Town alongside Martin Hinshelwood.

== Playing career ==
=== West Ham United and Exeter City ===
Alexander was born in Lambeth. He began his career with West Ham United, but his first taste of first team football came with a loan spell at Exeter City in the 1999–2000 season. Alexander scored 16 goals in 37 league games for the Grecians and although he was only on-loan to Exeter, became their Player of the Season. His form with Exeter convinced Swindon Town to sign him from West Ham for £300,000 in July 2000.

=== Swindon Town ===
Alexander's time at Swindon was short. He played only one season, scoring seven goals in 43 appearances in all competitions.

=== Hull City ===
With Swindon Town in financial difficulties they accepted a bid from Hull City in June 2001. His first season saw him score 20 goals in 47 appearances in all competitions and in the 2001–02 season he was awarded the Hull City Player of the Season award.

=== Leyton Orient ===
In January 2003, Alexander joined Leyton Orient on a two-year contract for an undisclosed fee. He scored twice in 17 games for the club during the 2002–03 season.

He scored 16 goals in 48 matches in all competitions across all competitions during the 2003–04 season, and was appointed as club captain during the season. He was given the club's Player of the Year award for the 2003–04 season, as well as winning the supporters club's equivalent award.

After six goals in five matches, Alexander won the League Two Player of the Month award for September 2005.

Alexander rejected a new deal in May 2007.

=== Millwall ===
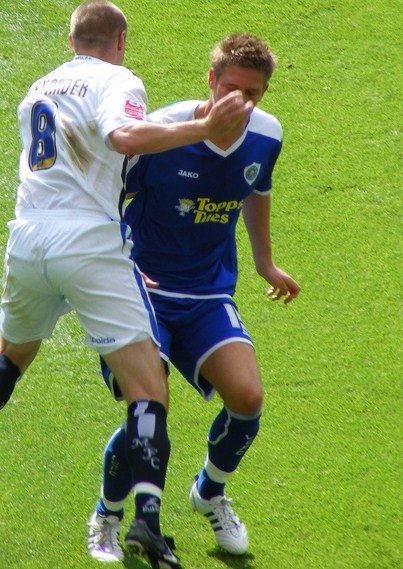
Alexander vs Michael Morrison of Leicester City on 13 September 2008.

On 11 June 2007, Millwall announced that Alexander would join the club on 1 July, following the expiry of his contract with Leyton Orient.

On 28 April 2009, Alexander extended his contract with Millwall by two years.

On 24 May 2009, Alexander scored twice for Millwall in the 2008–09 League One play-off final. However, he was unable to prevent Millwall losing 3–2 to Scunthorpe United, despite Alexander's two goals giving Millwall a 2–1 half-time lead. He missed a chance to put Millwall 3–1 up and claim his hat-trick.

=== Brentford ===
In August 2010 Alexander signed for Brentford for an undisclosed fee and made his debut on 7 August against Carlisle United. He scored his first Brentford goal a week later in a 2–1 home defeat to Walsall. On 28 January 2012, Alexander scored a hat-trick in a 5–2 win over Wycombe Wanderers.

=== Crawley Town ===
In March 2012 Alexander signed on loan for Crawley Town until the end of the 2011–12 season, with the move to be made permanent in the summer. Alexander scored seven goals in fourteen appearances for Crawley as they finished 3rd in League Two and were promoted to League One.

Manager Richie Barker appointed Alexander as Crawley club captain in August 2012.

On 31 January 2013, Alexander joined AFC Wimbledon, on loan until the end of the 2012–13 season. He scored three goals in 18 appearances, the last of which was the first in a 2–1 win over Fleetwood Town on 27 April 2013, the final day of the season, that preserved the Dons' Football League status.

Following the sacking of manager Ritchie Barker as Crawley manager, Alexander became caretaker manager on 28 November 2013, alongside chief scout Martin Hinshelwood.

=== Burton Albion ===
On 31 January 2014, Alexander signed for Burton Albion. He was released by the club at the end of the season.

== Coaching career ==
Alexander joined Greenwich Borough in July 2014. On 22 December 2015, Alexander became player-manager. He guided them to promotion from the Southern Counties East in 2015–16 and the following season they reached the Isthmian League South Division play-offs. He left the club in January 2018.

After turning out for Chatham Town for a couple of matches, Alexander joined Ashford United in mid-January 2018, initially as assistant manager team but with a view to becoming manager for the following season. He was sacked in November 2018. After a spell scouting for Millwall, he was appointed manager of Glebe in September 2019. Alexander resigned from this role in June 2021.

In December 2021, Alexander was appointed assistant to Interim Manager Grant Basey at Isthmian League Premier Division side Cray Wanderers.

On 4 February 2026, Alexander was appointed manager at Erith & Belvedere.

== Career statistics ==
Appearances and goals by club, season and competition
Club	Season	League			FA Cup		League Cup		Europe		Other		Total	
Club	Season	Division	Apps	Goals	Apps	Goals	Apps	Goals	Apps	Goals	Apps	Goals	Apps	Goals
West Ham United	1997–98	Premier League	0	0	0	0	0	0	―		―		0	0
West Ham United	1998–99	Premier League	0	0	0	0	0	0	―		―		0	0
West Ham United	1999–2000	Premier League	0	0	―		―		0	0	―		0	0
West Ham United	Total		0	0	0	0	0	0	0	0	―		0	0
Exeter City (loan)	1999–00	Third Division	37	16	3	1	1	0	―		4 (Note: Appearances in Football League Trophy)	2	45	19
Swindon Town	2000–01	Second Division	37	7	3	0	3	0	―		3	2	46	9
Hull City	2001–02	Third Division	43	17	2	2	2	1	―		3	3	50	23
Hull City	2002–03	Third Division	25	6	1	0	1	1	―		1	0	28	7
Hull City	Total		68	23	3	2	3	2	―		4	3	78	30
Leyton Orient	2002–03	Third Division	17	2	―		―		―		―		17	2
Leyton Orient	2003–04	Third Division	44	15	2	1	1	0	―		1	0	48	16
Leyton Orient	2004–05	League Two	28	9	0	0	1	0	―		2	1	31	10
Leyton Orient	2005–06	League Two	46	14	5	0	1	0	―		2	1	54	15
Leyton Orient	2006–07	League One	44	12	3	0	1	0	―		1	0	49	12
Leyton Orient	Total		179	52	10	1	4	0	―		6	2	199	55
Millwall	2007–08	League One	36	7	3	1	1	0	―		1	0	41	8
Millwall	2008–09	League One	35	11	4	2	1	0	―		3 (Note: Appearances in League One play-offs)	2	43	15
Millwall	2009–10	League One	16	1	0	0	1	1	―		3 (Note: 2 appearances in League One play-offs, 1 appearance in Football League Trophy)	0	20	2
Millwall	Total		86	19	7	3	3	1	―		7	2	104	25
Brentford	2010–11	League One	38	9	0	0	4	1	―		5	2	47	12
Brentford	2011–12	League One	24	12	2	0	1	0	―		3	2	30	14
Brentford	Total		62	21	2	0	5	1	―		8	4	77	26
Crawley Town (loan)	2011–12	League Two	14	7	―		―		―		―		14	7
Crawley Town	2012–13	League One	27	4	3	1	2	0	―		1	0	33	5
Crawley Town	2013–14	League One	21	4	3	0	1	1	―		1	0	26	5
Crawley Town	Total		62	15	6	1	3	1	―		2	0	73	17
AFC Wimbledon (loan)	2012–13	League Two	18	3	―		―		―		―		18	3
Burton Albion (loan)	2013–14	League Two	11	0	―		―		―		―		11	0
Greenwich Borough	2014–15	Southern Counties East League	33	20	0	0	―		―		5	4	38	24
Greenwich Borough	2015–16	Southern Counties East League	25	14	0	0	―		―		0	0	25	14
Greenwich Borough	2016–17	Isthmian League First Division South	9	0	3	0	―		―		2 (Note: Appearance in FA Trophy)	0	14	0
Greenwich Borough	Total		67	34	3	0	0	0	―		7	4	77	38
Chatham Town	2017–18	SCEL Premier Division	2	1	0	0	―		―		0	0	2	1
Ashford United	2017–18	Isthmian League South Division	1	0	0	0	―		―		0	0	1	0
Ashford United	2018–19	Isthmian League South East Division	0	0	0	0	―		―		1	0	1	0
Ashford United	Total		1	0	0	0	―		―		1	0	2	0
Career total			630	191	37	8	22	5	0	0	42	19	731	223

== Honours ==
=== As a player ===
Leyton Orient

- Football League Two third-place promotion: 2005–06

Millwall

- Football League One play-offs: 2010

Brentford

- Football League Trophy runner-up: 2010–11

Crawley Town

- Football League Two third-place promotion: 2011–12

Greenwich Borough

- Southern Counties East League: 2015–16

Individual

- Exeter City Player of the Year: 1999–2000
- Hull City Player of the Year: 2001–02

=== As a manager ===
Greenwich Borough

- Southern Counties East League: 2015–16
