= Alfred Young (artist) =

English conceptual and visual artist

Alfred A Young
- Born: 8 June 1936; London
- Education: London School of Printing; Royal College of Art
- Known for: Painting, drawing, conceptualism

Alfred Young (born 1936) is an English artist working in California. He is best known for his early contributions to San Francisco's conceptual and environmental art movements of the 1960s and 70s. His works include conceptual and mixed media pieces, as well as paintings and drawings.

== Biography ==
Alfred Young was born in 1936 in Lambeth, London. After completing a printing apprenticeship at the age of twenty-one, he quit his job to become a student at the London School of Printing (now the London College of Communication). After studying painting intensely for a year, he was allowed to join the Royal College of Art and continue painting as a postgraduate student. While studying at the Royal College, Young became intensely interested in the works of cubist Jacques Villon which featured bright prismatic colors. This led to an early fascination with Additive color. Three years after becoming an art teacher at the Kingston School of Art (now Kingston University), Young left for the United States. He spent the next three years teaching art at University of New Mexico before moving to San Francisco, California.

== Conceptual work ==
Young arrived in San Francisco and began teaching at University of San Francisco shortly before the Third World Liberation Front strikes of 1968, with which he became involved. Drawing inspiration from the non-violent demonstrations and creative forms of protest of the 1968 strikes, Young became interested in producing works that would be experienced outside of the art gallery, in a democratic and indeterminate way. In 1969, he began a series of collaborations with fellow USF art faculty Mel Henderson and Joe Hawley.

In September 1969, the three created a public environmental art piece, using a non-toxic yellow dye to spell out the word "OIL" in large capital letters in the San Francisco bay. The work was created after the 1969 Santa Barbara oil spill, and anticipated the devastating 1971 San Francisco Bay oil spill, which occurred near the location of the art piece. The work was revisited in the 2013 exhibition 'State of Mind: New California Art Circa 1970' at the Berkeley Art Museum and Pacific Film Archive, alongside works of other conceptual artists such as Ant Farm and Chris Burden.

In November 1969, the three began another piece that attempted to utilize both a participating public and a civic space. Organizing with friends and students, they produced a traffic jam of a hundred yellow cabs in San Francisco's Castro district. The initial confusion and annoyance caused by the disruption of street traffic evolved into amusement as the ridiculousness of the situation became clear to commuters and onlookers. A partial record of the event exists as a short film compiled from both aerial and ground footage of the intersection.

The final collaboration planned to again employ dye to draw alongside the Golden Gate Bridge. Young, improvising the work, drew a spiral large enough to be viewed from the bridge, allowing the image to be pulled and distorted by the current. Young later stated "We can't predict what the visual experience will be for people — the scene depends on their taking part in it."

== Contact Drawing ==
In 1980 Young discovered Contact Drawing. By having the subject stand against a screen of transparent material upon which he drew, and, after repeating the process a number of times, superimposed the drawings he created into a composite which melded different statements into a complete whole. By collapsing the distance between the subject and the picture plane he was able to overcome the restrictions of Renaissance perspective - predicated on one unmoving viewpoint - and use both eyes and move as he drew. This was an innovation in portraiture technique.

The method received positive responses from artists including Richard Serra and John Chamberlain. As he said at the time: Contact drawing operates in the margin between the subject and the camera's nearest focus. Drawings of many downtown New Yorkers followed.

In 1994, back in California, he made a freeze-like group-portrait of one hundred ten citizens of Pacific Grove. Called PAINTING THE TOWN the work measured two hundred and thirty-seven feet long and is believed to be the largest group portrait made by a single artist in the world. The work now resides in the Monterey Art Museum.

== Later Work ==
Circa 2007, Young began creating digitally edited Stereographic images and collages to be viewed through a lorgnette. This resulted in bound collection of works titled "The Optimix Suite", which now appears in the collections of several universities. A later collection became publicly available in the form of a Google Cardboard application.
