= Jimmy Williams (footballer, born 1982) =

English footballer

Personal information
- Date of birth: 15 July 1982 (age 44)
- Place of birth: Liverpool, England
- Position: Defender

Team information
- Current team: Kendal Town

Youth career
- 199?–1999: Swindon Town

Senior career*
Years	Team	Apps	(Gls)
1999–2002	Swindon Town	36	(1)
2003–2005	Southport	46	(0)
2005–2008	Droylsden	68	(2)
2008–	Kendal Town		
- * Club domestic league appearances and goals

James Williams (born 15 July 1982) is an English former professional footballer, who last played for Kendal Town and who currently coaches with Liverpool.

== Playing career ==
Williams began his career as a trainee with Swindon Town. He made his debut on 13 April 1999, as a substitute for Kevin Watson as Swindon drew 1–1 away to West Bromwich Albion. He played twice more in the Championship for Swindon that season, a home win against Grimsby Town and a defeat at home to Barnsley on the final day of the season. He played more regularly the following season as Swindon were relegated from the Championship, but played only sporadically the following two seasons due to injury and was released at the end of the 2001–02 season.

He joined Southport in the 2003 close-season, spending two seasons there until his release in June 2005.

He joined Droylsden later that month, and helped them to promotion to the Conference National. However, he played just once in the Conference National, as substitute for Sean Newton in the 2–1 defeat away to Weymouth on 15 April. He joined Kendal Town in August 2008.

== Coaching career ==
In 2015, Williams began working as a pre-Academy coach at the Liverpool F.C. Academy. As of 2026, he serves as the club's lead coach for the under-5 to under-8 level, as well as coaching the under-9 to under-11 age groups.

== Honours ==
Southport

- Conference North: 2004–05

Droylsden

- Conference North: 2006–07
