= George Ndah =

English footballer

Personal information
- Full name: George Ebialimolisa Ndah
- Date of birth: 23 December 1974 (age 51)
- Place of birth: Camberwell, England
- Position: Striker

Youth career
- Dulwich Hamlet
- Crystal Palace

Senior career*
Years	Team	Apps	(Gls)
1992–1997	Crystal Palace	101	(11)
1995	→ AFC Bournemouth (loan)	13	(2)
1997	→ Gillingham (loan)	4	(0)
1997–1999	Swindon Town	80	(21)
1999–2006	Wolverhampton Wanderers	87	(15)
Total		285	(31)
- * Club domestic league appearances and goals

George Ebialimolisa Ndah (born 23 December 1974) is an English former professional footballer who played as a striker from 1992 until 2006.

He played in the Premier League for Crystal Palace and in the Football League for AFC Bournemouth, Gillingham, Swindon Town and Wolverhampton Wanderers. In 1999, he was called up to play international football by Nigeria, but injury prevented him from making his debut and he was never selected again.

== Club career ==
=== Crystal Palace ===
Born in Camberwell, England, Ndah began his career as an apprentice at Crystal Palace, turning professional there in August 1992. Prior to that he had played youth-team football at Dulwich Hamlet. His older brother Jamie was also a footballer.

During his time at Selhurst Park he was loaned out twice. The first time was in 1995, when he played 15 games for AFC Bournemouth, then, two years later, he had a short spell at Gillingham, one that was curtailed by illness.

=== Swindon Town ===
Ndah moved to Swindon Town for £500,000, in November 1997, and in his two years with the Wiltshire side, he was a firm favourite of the crowd there. He scored 12 minutes into his debut against Middlesbrough on 22 November 1997.

=== Wolverhampton Wanderers ===
He departed for Wolverhampton Wanderers in October 1999, brought about by financial problems at the County Ground. He signed for Wolves at a cost of £1 million. Unfortunately his Wolves career suffered an early blow when his leg was broken by Matt Carbon during only his third game, against local rivals West Bromwich Albion. He recovered from his broken leg and knee and groin injuries to resume his Molineux career in the autumn of 2000 and soon made himself a popular figure with the Molineux faithful – especially after his two-goal return in the home victory over West Bromwich Albion. Injuries again scotched hopes for a better 2001/02. Ndah made just one start that term, although he did score the winner in a 2–1 home win over Rotherham United in February 2002.

Despite missing part of pre-season, the striker enjoyed a brighter 2002–03. He made a total of 30 appearances in Wolves' promotion-winning season, scoring 11 goals. Ndah became something of a hero as Wolves progressed to the quarter-finals of the FA Cup, with him netting four goals in the first three rounds of the competition. After scoring the winner against Premier League side Newcastle United, he scored twice in a 4–1 win over Leicester City. One of these strikes, a fine solo effort, drew him to the widespread attention of the media. Injury again blighted the end of Ndah's season. He pulled up with a knee problem in the play-off first leg against Reading, which kept him out of the final. He later underwent exploratory surgery to try to solve the problem. Due to the rehabilitation period, Ndah missed the pre-season training camp in Spain and instead worked through an intensive programme at Lilleshall.

He failed to recover to the point where he was able to make any contribution to the 2003–04 season. He signed a 12-month contract extension in the close season of 2004 before heading off on the pre-season tour of Norway, where he played his first match in over a year but a catalogue of niggling muscle injuries again stopped Ndah from making his mark in 2004–05. However, Glenn Hoddle offered the striker a lifeline in the form of a new contract in summer 2005 and he enjoyed a strong pre-season. He made his first League appearance in over two years when he came on as a substitute to a standing ovation in Wolves' win over Crystal Palace in the first home game of the new campaign.

Ndah was a regular in the squad in the first half of 2005–06 and scored his first goal in two and a half years, away to Derby in November. However, he suffered a serious knee injury at Sheffield Wednesday in December and failed to make a return to first-team football. Ndah announced his retirement with immediate effect on 28 April 2006 due to another season plagued with injury. He came to the stadium with his close family and said a final goodbye to the fans.

== International career ==
George was called up to the Nigeria national team in 1999, but had to miss the trip due to injury.

== Personal life ==
He has an older brother, Jamie, who also played at a lower league level with Horsham, Torquay United and Barnet among others. His son Max signed for Walton Casuals in August 2019 but has since moved to Staines Town
