= Andy Williams (Welsh footballer) =

English-born Welsh footballer

Personal information
- Full name: Andrew Phillip Rees Williams
- Date of birth: 8 October 1977 (age 49)
- Place of birth: Bristol, England
- Height: 5 ft 10 in (1.78 m)
- Position: Defender

Youth career
- 1992–1996: Southampton

Senior career*
Years	Team	Apps	(Gls)
1996–1999	Southampton	21	(0)
1999	Swindon Town (loan)	4	(0)
1999–2001	Swindon Town	40	(1)
2001–2004	Bath City		

International career
1997–1998	Wales	2	(0)
- * Club domestic league appearances and goals

Andrew Phillip Rees Williams (born 8 October 1977) is a former professional footballer who played as a winger.

== Football career ==
Williams began his playing career as a trainee at Southampton. During his time at Southampton he played just 21 league games, which included coming on as a substitute as Southampton won 3–2 against Liverpool at Anfield in February 1998. After a brief loan spell at Swindon Town in 1999, the Wiltshire club signed him on a permanent basis and he went on to make a total of 47 appearances in all competitions in his twenty months at the club, scoring one goal against Wolverhampton Wanderers. In 2001, he gave up playing full-time football due to injury. He joined Bath City, and began a career with the police. He spent three years in Bath before being forced to entirely retire from football due to a knee injury in 2004.

Williams won two full caps for Wales, against Brazil in 1997 and Malta in 1998.

== Personal life ==
He was brought up in Bishop Sutton, attending the local secondary school Chew Valley School. Andy now works at Future Publishing in Bath where he recently received an award for his 'Outstanding Contribution' over the year. He lives near Bristol.
