= Alan Young (English footballer) =

English footballer

Personal information
- Full name: Alan James Young
- Date of birth: 12 August 1983 (age 43)
- Place of birth: England
- Position: Forward

Senior career*
| Years | Team | Apps | (Gls) |
| 2003–2004 | Swindon Town | 72 | (11) |
- * Club domestic league appearances and goals

Alan Young (born 12 August 1983) is an English retired footballer.
