= Chris Hay =

Scottish footballer

Personal information
- Full name: Christopher Drummond Hay
- Date of birth: 28 August 1974 (age 52)
- Place of birth: Glasgow, Scotland
- Height: 5 ft 11 in (1.80 m)
- Position: Striker

Youth career
- 1992–1993: Giffnock North

Senior career*
Years	Team	Apps	(Gls)
1993–1997	Celtic	26	(4)
1997–2000	Swindon Town	98	(32)
2000–2002	Huddersfield Town	49	(5)
2002–2005	St Johnstone	70	(20)
2005–2008	Stirling Albion	29	(6)
Total		272	(67)
- * Club domestic league appearances and goals

Christopher Drummond Hay (born 28 August 1974) is a Scottish former professional footballer. He played as a striker for Celtic, Swindon Town, Huddersfield Town, St Johnstone and Stirling Albion.

Hay began his professional career at Celtic in 1993, but only managed to make 26 league appearances in four years. He joined English club Swindon Town in 1997, and in just under a century of league appearances he scored 32 goals. In 2000, Hay moved to Huddersfield Town and spent two less successful seasons at the McAlpine Stadium.

Hay returned to Scotland in 2002 with Billy Stark's St Johnstone. He was Saints' top scorer in his first season, notching nine league goals. He went on to make 70 league appearances for the Perth club before joining Stirling Albion in 2005. He scored a hat-trick against Forfar Athletic on 3 December 2005.
