= Frazer McHugh =

English footballer

Personal information
- Full name: Frazer McHugh
- Date of birth: 14 July 1981 (age 45)
- Place of birth: Nottingham, England
- Height: 5 ft 11 in (1.80 m)
- Position: Midfielder

Team information
- Current team: Gedling Town

Senior career*
Years	Team	Apps	(Gls)
1998–2001	Swindon Town	18	(0)
2001	Bromsgrove Rovers	?	(?)
2001–2002	Tamworth	?	(?)
2002–2003	Gainsborough Trinity	?	(?)
2003	Bromsgrove Rovers	?	(?)
2003	Halesowen Town	?	(?)
2003–2004	Bradford City	5	(0)
2004	Notts County	13	(0)
2004–?	Hucknall Town	?	(?)
	Redditch United	?	(?)
	Belper Town	?	(?)
	Gedling Town	?	(?)
- * Club domestic league appearances and goals as of 04:05, 5 August 2007 (UTC)

Frazer McHugh (born 14 July 1981) is an English professional footballer who last played for Gedling Town in the East Midlands Counties Football League, where he plays as a midfielder.
