= Sam Campagna =

English footballer

Personal information
- Full name: Sam Patrick Philip Campagna
- Date of birth: 19 November 1980 (age 45)
- Place of birth: Worcester, England
- Height: 6 ft 1 in (1.85 m)
- Position: Central defender

Youth career
- Swindon Town

Senior career*
Years	Team	Apps	(Gls)
1998–2001	Swindon Town	5	(0)
2000	→ Bath City (loan)	10	(0)
2001–200?	Bromsgrove Rovers		
200?–2002	Evesham United		
2002–200?	Malvern Town		
- * Club domestic league appearances and goals

Sam Patrick Philip Campagna (born 19 November 1980) is an English former professional football defender.

== Career ==
Born in Worcester, Campagna began his career as a trainee with Swindon Town, turning professional in August 1998. He made his debut on 14 November 1998, as a late substitute for Mark Walters, in Swindon's 3–0 defeat to Bradford City, having been an unused substitute the previous week. His only other game that season came on the final day when he came on for Brian Borrows late in Swindon's 3–1 defeat at home to Barnsley. He made three further appearances the following season before joining Bath City on loan in March 2000, playing in the final ten games of the season.

He was released by Swindon in May 2001 and joined Bromsgrove Rovers, moving on to Evesham United and then to Malvern Town in March 2002.

== External lists ==
- Sam Campagna at Soccerbase
