= Bobby Howe (footballer, born 1973) =

English footballer

Personal information
- Full name: Stephen Robert Howe
- Date of birth: 6 November 1973 (age 52)
- Place of birth: Cramlington, Northumberland, England
- Position: Midfielder

Senior career*
Years	Team	Apps	(Gls)
1990–1998	Nottingham Forest	14	(2)
1997	→ Ipswich Town (loan)	3	(0)
1998–2002	Swindon Town	122	(6)
2002–2005	Havant & Waterlooville		
- Farnborough Town
Total		139	(8)
- * Club domestic league appearances and goals

Bobby Howe (born 6 November 1973) is an English former professional footballer who played as a midfielder. He played junior football for Cramlington Juniors FC before he joined Nottingham Forest playing from 1990 to 1998 but making just 14 league appearances in that time. He later joined Swindon Town for a £30,000 fee, where he made his last league appearance in 2002. He later played non league football for Havant & Waterlooville and Farnborough Town.
