= Gareth Davies (footballer, born 1973) =

English-born Welsh footballer

Personal information
- Full name: Gareth Melville Davies
- Date of birth: 11 December 1973 (age 52)
- Place of birth: Hereford, England
- Position: Centre back

Youth career
- 1989–1992: Hereford United

Senior career*
Years	Team	Apps	(Gls)
1992–1995	Hereford United	95	(2)
1995–1997	Crystal Palace	27	(2)
1997	→ Cardiff City (loan)	6	(2)
1997–1999	Reading	19	(0)
1999–2002	Swindon Town	25	(0)
2002–2003	Chippenham Town	15	(2)
2014–????	Hay Sunday Saints	0	(0)

International career
- Wales U21
- * Club domestic league appearances and goals

Gareth Melville Davies (born 11 December 1973) is a Welsh former professional footballer who played as a central defender. He made over 100 appearances in the English Football League during his career before being forced to retire after a long-term knee injury.

Although he was born in England, he grew up just across the border in Wales and represented them at Under 21 level.

== Personal life ==
Davies was born in Hereford. His cousin, Kevin Sheedy, was also a professional footballer.

His son, Rhys, is also a professional footballer who plays for Aberystwyth Town having previously played for Hereford FC.

== Career ==
Davies joined his local club Hereford United as a YTS trainee at the age of 15, making his debut for the first team in 1992. He was sold to Crystal Palace in 1995 for a £120,000 fee, and was later transferred for £175,000 to Reading. He made one Premier League appearance for Crystal Palace in a game against Leicester City.

He first suffered an injury to his knee while playing for Swindon Town, which severely restricted his appearances for the club. In 2002, after undergoing three operations on his knee, Davies decided to retire from professional football. He later played for non-league side Chippenham Town, before retiring from football altogether in 2003 to work in the recruitment industry.
