= Giuliano Grazioli =

English footballer (born 1975)

Personal information
- Full name: Giuliano Stefano Luigi Grazioli
- Date of birth: 23 March 1975 (age 51)
- Place of birth: Marylebone, England
- Position: Forward

Senior career*
Years	Team	Apps	(Gls)
1995	Wembley		
1995–1999	Peterborough United	40	(16)
1995	→ Yeovil Town (loan)	11	(15)
1996	→ Woking (loan)	5	(6)
1997–1998	→ Stevenage Borough (loan)	12	(7)
1999–2002	Swindon Town	78	(18)
2002–2003	Bristol Rovers	34	(11)
2003–2008	Barnet	131	(68)
2007	→ AFC Wimbledon (loan)	2	(0)
2008	Braintree Town	?	(?)
2008–2009	Dover Athletic	20	(2)

Managerial career
- 2011: Barnet (caretaker)
- * Club domestic league appearances and goals

Giuliano Stefano Luigi Grazioli (born 23 March 1975, in Marylebone) is an English former footballer who played as a striker from 1995 until 2009, notably for Barnet FC.

As a footballer he also played for Wembley, Yeovil Town, Peterborough United, Woking, Stevenage Borough, Swindon Town, Bristol Rovers, AFC Wimbledon, Braintree Town and Dover Athletic.

== Playing career ==
Raised in London of Italian origin, he attended Finchley Catholic High School in London. He scored in Stevenage Borough's fourth round FA Cup game against Newcastle United in the 1997–98 season to leave the game at 1–1 and force a replay. He has also had spells at Enfield, Bristol Rovers, Swindon Town and Peterborough United. He played for North London side Barnet and, during his time at the club, has had a loan spell with AFC Wimbledon, before closing out his career with spells at Braintree Town and Dover Athletic.

Grazioli's time at Peterborough is best remembered for the five goals he scored in the club's record win, a 9–1 victory away at Barnet on 5 September 1998.

Grazioli joined Barnet as part of a deal that took Junior Agogo to Bristol Rovers. Rovers paid £110,000 for Agogo with Grazioli going the other way. He helped Barnet gain promotion from the Football Conference to the Football League in the 2004–05 season. He was the top scorer in the conference with 29 goals – seven more than nearest rival Michael Twiss of Morecambe. A hand injury kept Grazioli out of much of the following season – Barnet's first season back in League Two.

Between the 2006–07 and 2007–08, Grazioli underwent keyhole surgery for a knee injury, following which he moved to AFC Wimbledon on 7 September 2007 on a five-week loan spell.

In January 2008 Grazioli was transfer-listed, mainly due to not being able to break into the first-team due to persistent injuries and lack of fitness. On 31 January, deadline day, he rejected a loan move to Grays Athletic. On 26 April 2008, Grazioli played his last ever home game for Barnet, as a substitute against Stockport County, in which he received a standing ovation from the fans in appreciation of his prolific goal scoring which took the Bees into the Football League.

Grazioli joined Conference South side Braintree Town in August 2008. But after only a month, he signed for Isthmian League side Dover Athletic on 11 September 2008 and made his debut for them as a substitute in a 2–1 win over Tonbridge Angels in the FA Cup. Grazioli made over 20 appearances for Dover Athletic before announcing his retirement in March 2009 due to a sustained head injury. His final appearance came in a 0–0 draw with Staines Town.

== Coaching and management career ==
It was reported in June 2009 that he had been appointed as a scout at Bristol Rovers. In April 2010 he rejoined Barnet in a new role as community development officer. After the appointment of Martin Allen as manager of Barnet in March 2011, Grazioli was made Allen's assistant. In April 2011 after the shock resignation of Allen to go to Notts County Grazioli was appointed caretaker manager for the rest of the season with Lawrie Sanchez acting as Director of Football. His first game in charge was a 2–0 defeat at Bury. The Bees went into the final day of the season two points behind Lincoln City and following a 1–0 win at home to Port Vale coupled with a 3–0 defeat to Aldershot for Lincoln, it was the Imps who suffered relegation to the Conference National, completing a miraculous revival for Barnet, who had spent practically the entire season in the bottom two.

In May 2011 he was appointed as the club's new assistant manager to Lawrie Sanchez. He left the club at the end of the 2011–12 season. In September 2012, Martin Allen announced that Grazioli has been scouting for Gillingham.

== Managerial statistics ==
As of 7 May 2011

Team	From	To	Record				
Team	From	To	G	W	D	L	Win %
Barnet	11 April 2011	30 June 2011	5	2	1	2	40.00
Total			5	2	1	2	40.00

== Honours ==
- Conference National Winner: 2005
- Isthmian League Premier Division Winner: 2009
