= Alan Reeves (footballer) =

English footballer

Personal information
- Date of birth: 19 November 1967 (age 58)
- Place of birth: Birkenhead, England
- Position: Centre-back

Team information
- Current team: Leicester City (scout)

Senior career*
Years	Team	Apps	(Gls)
1987–1988	Heswall		(-)
1988–1989	Norwich City	0	(0)
1989	→ Gillingham (loan)	18	(0)
1989–1991	Chester City	40	(2)
1991–1994	Rochdale	121	(9)
1994–1998	Wimbledon	57	(4)
1998–2006	Swindon Town	208	(12)
Total		444	(27)

Managerial career
- 2005–2006: Swindon Town (player-assistant)
- 2006–2007: Brentford (assistant)
- 2014–2019: AFC Wimbledon (U23)
- 2020–: Leicester City (scout)
- * Club domestic league appearances and goals

Alan Reeves (born 19 November 1967) is an English football coach and former footballer.

As a player, he was a centre back who notably played in the Premier League for Wimbledon. He also played in the Football League for Norwich City, Gillingham, Chester City, Rochdale and Swindon Town.

He has since managed the under-23 side at AFC Wimbledon, a position he held for five years from 2014, departing in May 2019 by mutual consent.

== Playing career ==
He was known primarily as a reliable centre half for Football League clubs, although he played FA Premier League football for four seasons with Wimbledon during the 1990s. He also played for Gillingham, Chester City, Rochdale and Swindon Town, where he spent the last eight years of his playing career before hanging up his boots in 2006, also as a player/coach, before becoming assistant manager.

== Coaching career ==
Reeves served as assistant manager for Brentford, from where he left with manager Scott Fitzgerald on 10 April 2007 after the club's relegation. He interviewed for the vacant Crawley Town manager role in May 2007, but was unsuccessful in receiving the job, reportedly due to differences with then chairman James Moore.

On 19 June 2014, it was announced than Alan would become the new AFC Wimbledon Development Squad and Academy under-23 manager. After five years, he left the club by mutual consent on 14 May 2019.

In 2020, Reeves began working as a scout for Leicester City.

== Personal life ==
His twin brother David was also a professional footballer, most notably with Bolton Wanderers, Carlisle United and Chesterfield.

Whilst his brother was coaching at Gainsborough Trinity. Alan stated on an interview with LBC Radio that he sent letters to prospective clubs, purporting to be from his brother, in order to secure trials with them.

== Honours ==
Individual

- PFA Team of the Year: 1993–94 Third Division
