= Adam Willis (footballer) =

English footballer

Personal information
- Full name: Adam Peter Willis
- Date of birth: 21 September 1976 (age 50)
- Place of birth: Nuneaton, England
- Height: 6 ft 1 in (1.85 m)
- Position: Central defender

Youth career
- 1994–1995: Coventry City

Senior career*
Years	Team	Apps	(Gls)
1995–1998	Coventry City	0	(0)
1998–2003	Swindon Town	92	(1)
1999	→ Mansfield Town (loan)	10	(0)
2003–2004	Kidderminster Harriers	12	(1)
2003	→ Burton Albion (loan)	6	(0)
2004–2005	Hinckley United	42	(1)
Total		162	(3)
- * Club domestic league appearances and goals

Adam Peter Willis (born 21 September 1976) is an English former professional footballer who played as a central defender who made over 100 appearances in the Football League.

== Career ==
Born in Nuneaton, Willis began his career with Coventry City. However, he never made an appearance for the first team, and instead made his professional debut in 1998 with Swindon Town. Between 1998 and 2003, Willis made a total of 92 league appearances for Swindon. While at Swindon, Willis played 10 league games on loan at Mansfield Town. Willis later played for Kidderminster Harriers, making 12 league appearances during the 2003–04 season. While at Kidderminster, Willis spent a loan spell at non-league Burton Albion, and after leaving Kidderminster in 2004, signed for non-league club Hinckley United.

== Personal life ==
Willis graduated from the University of Worcester gaining a first class honours degree in Physical Education and then going on to complete the Graduate Teacher Programme to become a Secondary PE Teacher.
