= A Better Fort =

Community organization

- Formation: 2010
- Founder: Alex Smith; Shane Araujo
- Dissolved: 2014
- Type: NGO
- Headquarters: Fort Wayne, Indiana
- Region served: Downtown Fort Wayne and surrounding neighborhoods
- Services: Service opportunities, philanthropic endeavors, innovative projects, and cultural discovery.
- Key people: Christine Fisher (Volunteer Coordination); Sam DiFlippo (Executive Director / Principal)
- Website: abetterfort.com

A Better Fort was a community organization dedicated to providing positive experiences that make a difference in the lives of individuals in Fort Wayne, Indiana. Their focus was on community empowerment and the retention of young talent.

== Mission ==
During the four years of operation of A Better Fort from 2010 through 2014, the organization had a mission to provide positive life experiences that make a difference in the lives of individuals in Fort Wayne, Indiana. The focus was on community empowerment and the retention of young talent. Members had opportunities to achieve their highest potential through service, philanthropic endeavors, innovative projects, cultural discovery, and service opportunities. Participants would lead their communities through ideals of service, empowerment, persistence, and education.

== Activities ==
=== #HipHop4theCity ===
HipHop4theCity was a collaborative music-based and community-driven project that resulted in the song and music video entitled MY CITY. The project worked to bring together over a dozen local artists, producers, and volunteers at the time of its creation and release in late 2011 and early 2012. The music video amassed over 250,000 views and press coverage from both local and national publications.

The project showcased local talent and brought awareness to community involvement, the arts, and civic pride, which garnered the attention of national economic development publications and blogs. It also sparked a chain of events pertaining to economic development in Northeast Indiana, such as the My City Summit and the My City Pin. The artist Nyzzy Nyce, who worked on this project, re-released a national rendition of the song on VEVO entitled MY CITY (National).

=== #House4aHouse ===
House4aHouse began as an annual block party with a focus on Electronic dance music. The event donated $5,000 each year it ran to a local nonprofit organization and, in the first three years, donated over $15,000 to the Mad Anthony's Children's Hope House. In 2014 the event was hosted under the alternate name BAALS Music Festival.

=== #Ball4ACause ===
The organization hosted an annual charity basketball game featuring local celebrities from Fort Wayne who worked in diverse industries such as entertainment and politics. The two teams competed against each other to raise funds and awareness for two selected non-profit organizations in the community.

=== Zombie Prom ===
A Better Fort hosted the annual Halloween Zombie Prom and fundraiser that took place during Downtown Fort Wayne's Fright Night annual festivities.
