= BAALS Music Festival =

Annual event in Indiana, US

Coordinates: 41°05′09″N 85°08′19″W

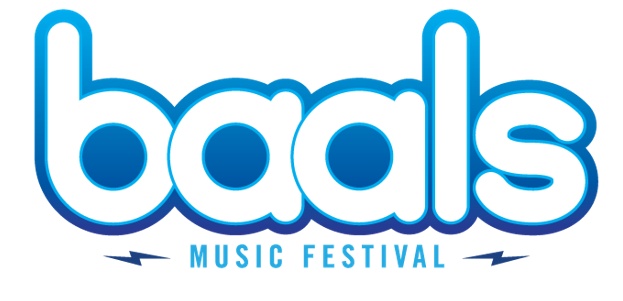
- Genre: Trance; dance; EDM; jam band; house; drum and bass; techno; dance-punk; hip hop
- Dates: Late July / early August
- Locations: Fort Wayne, Indiana, U.S.
- Years active: 2012–2016
- Founders: A Better Fort; Shane Araujo; Alex Smith
- Website: www.itsbaals.com

BAALS is a music festival which is primarily focused on electronic dance music, dance music and jam bands. The festival takes place in the city of Fort Wayne, Indiana and has been organized since 2012. Each year the festival earmarks and donates $5,000 to a local charity, cause or nonprofit. The first edition of the festival took place in 2012 as a downtown block part called House 4 a House. In 2014 the festival expanded to Headwaters Park at which point it changed its name to the BAALS Music Festival.

== History ==
The event began on July 13, 2012, as a downtown block party entitled House4aHouse. The host of the event was an advocacy group called A Better Fort who coincided the block party with another festival called The Three Rivers Festival. This block party raised $5,000, donated it to a local non-profit and garnered 2,000 attendees in its first year. Around the inaugural year the city of Fort Wayne endured ridicule, including multiple skits on Jimmy Kimmel Live!, as the city explored naming a government building the “Harry Baals Government Center” after a former city Mayor.

In 2014, festival leaders changed the event name to BAALS citing the reason for the name change is to take the recently publicized stereotypes and poke fun at them. That same year the festival amassed 10,000 attendees between the two-part series and moved to Headwaters Park in downtown Fort Wayne.

== Philanthropy ==
The BAALS Music Festival donates up to $5,000 each year to a selected local charity. In its first three years under A Better Fort, the festival donated a total of $15,000 to the Mad Anthony Children's Hope House.

== See also ==
- List of electronic music festivals
- Live electronic music
