= Alex Smith (businessman) =

American businessman

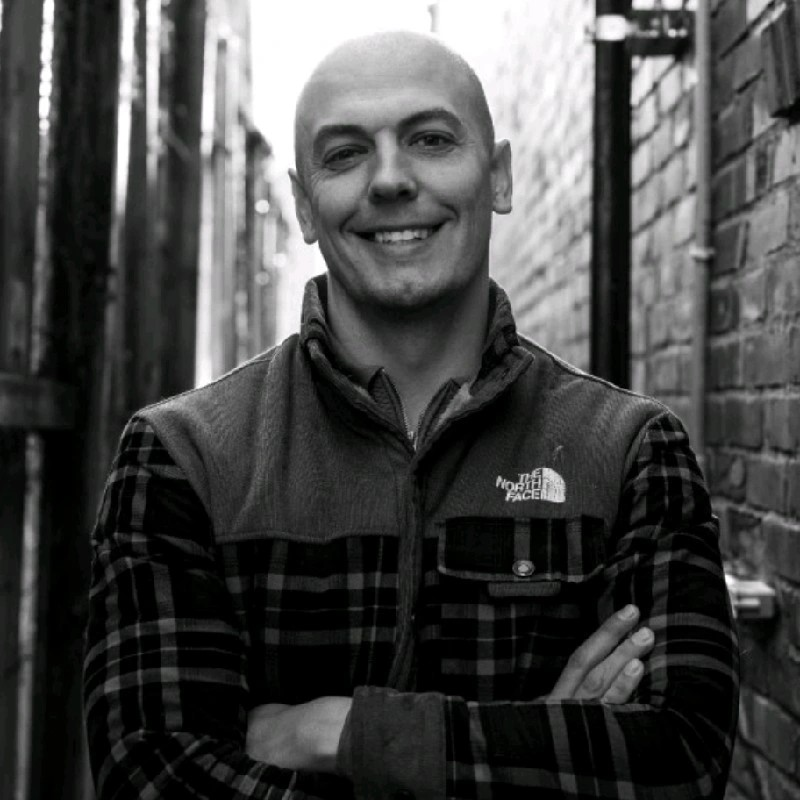
- Born: November 6, 1986 (age 39); Fort Wayne, Indiana
- Education: Indiana University
- Occupation: Entrepreneur

Alex Smith (born November 6, 1986, in Fort Wayne, Indiana) is an American entrepreneur. He is the co-founder & CEO of 3BG Supply Co., an industrial distributor, and the co-founder and CEO of KloudStax, a cloud computing company that became a Google Cloud Premier Partner in 2024. He is also a co-founder of A Better Fort and the BAALS Music Festival.

== Biography ==
Alex Smith was born in Fort Wayne, Indiana, where he attended Bishop Dwenger High School. He graduated from Indiana University with a bachelor's degree in Public Financial Management.

Smith began his career as a financial planner at Galecki Financial Management but left financial services to co-found 3BG Supply Co.

An article in Industrial Distribution profiled Smith and 3BG's business model, describing how the company evolved into a “tech-enabled distributor,” combining drop shipping and a proprietary product data platform to modernize the industrial supply chain.

In 2023 he co-founded KloudStax, a technology company focused on cloud computing services and Google Cloud licensing. The company was recognized as a Google Cloud Premier Partner in 2024.

== Recognition and awards ==
- 2014 — Recognized as Emerging Company of the Year by Fort Wayne Business Weekly.
- 2015 — Named a Business of the Year honoree at the Northeast Indiana Business Excellence Awards.
- 2015 — Nominated for Tech Innovation of the Year at the TechPoint Mira Awards.
- 2019 — Named Regional Business of the Year by Elevate Ventures.
- 2021 — Included on the Inc. 5000 list of fastest-growing private companies in the United States, ranking No. 2,124.
- 2022 — Received the Business Expansion Award from Greater Fort Wayne Inc.

== Projects ==
=== The MY CITY Project (HipHop4theCity) ===
In 2012, Smith facilitated a music project entitled, "HipHop4theCity",(aka The MY CITY Project) a community-driven hip-hop project that involved collaboration with local musicians, including rapper Nyzzy Nyce. The project showcased the region's undiscovered talent and brought awareness to community involvement and the arts. Covered by Bloomberg, it inspired the civic initiative MY CITY Summit.

== Personal life ==
Smith is married to Michaela Smith.
