= 1997–98 Reading F.C. season =

Reading
1997–98 season
- Chairman: John Madejski
- Manager: Terry Bullivant (until 18 March); Alan Pardew (caretaker, 18-25 March); Tommy Burns (from 25 March)
- Stadium: Elm Park
- First Division: 24th (relegated)
- FA Cup: Fifth round (eliminated by Sheffield United)
- EFL Cup: Fifth round (eliminated by Middlesbrough)
- Top goalscorer: League: Carl Asaba (8); All: Carl Asaba (12)
Home colours

The 1997–98 season was Reading's 127th year in existence and fourth consecutive season in the First Division, and covered the period from 1 July 1997 to 30 June 1998. Reading finished the season in 24th position, resulting in relegation back to the Second Division. In the Football League Cup, Reading were knocked out by Middlesbrough at the Fifth Round stage, whilst in the FA Cup, Sheffield United knocked Reading out at the Fifth Round stage.

== Season events ==
Reading started the season under new manager Terry Bullivant, with Bullivant resigning on 18 March 1998. Alan Pardew was appointed caretaker-manager for seven days before Tommy Burns was appointed as the club's new manager on 26 March 1998.

== Squad ==
As of match played 3 May 1998

Name	Nationality	Position	Date of birth (Age (Note: Age as of the end of the season))	Signed from	Signed in	Contract ends	Apps.	Goals
Goalkeepers
Steve Mautone	(Australia)	GK	10 August 1970 (aged 27)	West Ham United	1997		34	0
Jamie Ashdown	(England)	GK	30 November 1980 (aged 17)	Trainee	1998		0	0
Sal Bibbo	(England)	GK	24 August 1974 (aged 23)	Sheffield United	1996		9	0
Nick Hammond	(England)	GK	7 September 1967 (aged 30)	Plymouth Argyle	1996		31	0
Nick Colgan	(Republic of Ireland)	GK	19 September 1973 (aged 24)	loan from Chelsea	1998	1998	5	0
Scott Howie	(Scotland)	GK	4 January 1972 (aged 26)	Motherwell	1998		7	0
Defenders
Andy Bernal	(Australia)	DF	21 February 1973 (aged 25)	Sydney Olympic	1994		174	2
Martyn Booty	(England)	DF	30 May 1971 (aged 26)	Crewe Alexandra	1996		70	2
Keith McPherson	(England)	DF	11 September 1963 (aged 34)	Northampton Town	1990			
Linvoy Primus	(England)	DF	14 September 1973 (aged 24)	Barnet	1997		43	1
Steve Swales	(England)	DF	26 December 1973 (aged 24)	Scarborough	1995		56	1
Michael Thorp	(England)	DF	5 December 1975 (aged 22)	Trainee	1995		9	0
Barry Hunter	(Northern Ireland)	DF	18 November 1968 (aged 29)	Wrexham	1996		29	2
Dariusz Wdowczyk	(Poland)	DF	25 September 1962 (aged 35)	Celtic	1994		104	0
Stuart Gray	(Scotland) (Note: Stuart Gray was born in Harrogate, England, but also qualified to represent Scotland internationally, representing Scotland U21 between 1995 and 1996.)	DF	18 December 1973 (aged 24)	Celtic	1998		7	0
Paddy Kelly	(Scotland)	DF	26 April 1978 (aged 20)	loan from Newcastle United	1998	1998	3	0
Paul Bodin	(Wales)	DF	13 September 1964 (aged 33)	Swindon Town	1996		45	1
Gareth Davies	(Wales) (Note: Gareth Davies was born in Hereford, England, but also qualified to represent Wales internationally, representing Wales U21.)	DF	11 December 1973 (aged 24)	Crystal Palace	1997		22	0
Andy Legg	(Wales)	DF	28 July 1966 (aged 31)	Birmingham City	1998		10	0
Midfielders
Darren Caskey	(England)	MF	21 August 1974 (aged 23)	Tottenham Hotspur	1996		79	3
Andy Freeman	(England)	MF	8 September 1977 (aged 20)	Trainee	1995		1	0
Byron Glasgow	(England)	MF	18 February 1979 (aged 19)	Trainee	1996		8	0
Lee Hodges	(England)	MF	4 September 1973 (aged 24)	Barnet	1997		35	6
Jamie Lambert	(England)	MF	14 September 1973 (aged 24)	Trainee	1992		151	20
Phil Parkinson	(England)	MF	1 December 1967 (aged 30)	Bury	1992		255	11
Michael O'Neill	(Northern Ireland)	MF	5 July 1969 (aged 28)	loan from Coventry City	1998		9	1
Jim Crawford	(Republic of Ireland) (Note: Jim Crawford was born in Chicago, United States, but also qualified to represent Republic of Ireland internationally, representing Republic of Ireland U21 between 1993 and 1994.)	MF	1 May 1973 (aged 25)	Newcastle United	1998		6	0
Ray Houghton	(Republic of Ireland)	MF	9 January 1962 (aged 36)	Crystal Palace	1997		35	1
Michael Meaker	(Wales) (Note: Michael Meaker was born in Greenford, England, but also qualified to represent Wales internationally, representing Wales U21 and Wales B.)	MF	18 August 1971 (aged 25)	Queens Park Rangers	1995		73	3
Forwards
Stuart Lovell	(Australia)	FW	9 January 1972 (aged 26)	Trainee	1990			
Carl Asaba	(England)	FW	28 January 1973 (aged 25)	Brentford	1997		42	12
Paul Brayson	(England)	FW	16 September 1977 (aged 20)	Newcastle United	1998		6	1
Trevor Morley	(England)	FW	20 March 1961 (aged 37)	West Ham United	1995		91	38
Martin Williams	(England)	FW	12 July 1973 (aged 24)	Luton Town	1995		86	12
Robert Fleck	(Scotland)	FW	11 August 1965 (aged 32)	Norwich City	1998		5	0
Jim McIntyre	(Scotland)	FW	24 May 1972 (aged 25)	Kilmarnock	1998		6	0
Jason Bowen	(Wales)	FW	24 August 1972 (aged 25)	Birmingham City	1997		20	1
Out on loan
Neville Roach	(England)	FW	29 September 1978 (aged 19)	Trainee	1996		16	2
Left during the season
Lee Sandford	(England)	DF	22 April 1968 (aged 30)	loan from Sheffield United	1997	1997	5	0
Paul Holsgrove	(England)	MF	26 August 1969 (aged 28)	Millwall	1994		86	7
Ben Smith	(England)	MF	23 November 1978 (aged 19)	Arsenal	1996		1	0
David Whyte	(England)	FW	20 April 1971 (aged 27)	Charlton Athletic	1997		0	0
Mark Robins	(England)	FW	22 December 1969 (aged 28)	loan from Leicester City	1997	1997	5	0

=== Out on loan ===
Note: Flags indicate national team as defined under FIFA eligibility rules; some limited exceptions apply. Players may hold more than one non-FIFA nationality.

No. / Pos. / Nation / Player; — / FW / ENG / Neville Roach (at Kingstonian)	No. / Pos. / Nation / Player

=== Left club during season ===
Note: Flags indicate national team as defined under FIFA eligibility rules; some limited exceptions apply. Players may hold more than one non-FIFA nationality.

No.	Pos.	Nation	Player
—	DF	ENG	Lee Sandford (loan return to Sheffield United)
—	MF	ENG	Paul Holsgrove (to Crewe Alexandra)
—	MF	ENG	Ben Smith (to Yeovil Town)

No.	Pos.	Nation	Player
—	FW	ENG	David Whyte (to Ipswich Town)
—	FW	ENG	Mark Robins (loan return to Leicester City)

== Transfers ==
=== In ===
Date	Position	Nationality	Name	From	Fee	Ref.
15 July 1997	MF	(Republic of Ireland)	Ray Houghton	Crystal Palace	Free	
1 August 1997	DF	(England)	Linvoy Primus	Barnet	£250,000	
1 August 1997	MF	(England)	Lee Hodges	Barnet	£250,000	
7 August 1997	FW	(England)	Carl Asaba	Brentford	£800,000	
23 September 1997	FW	(England)	David Whyte	Charlton Athletic	Free	
11 December 1997	DF	(Wales)	Gareth Davies	Crystal Palace	£175,000	
26 December 1997	FW	(Wales)	Jason Bowen	Birmingham City	£200,000	
20 February 1998	DF	(Wales)	Andy Legg	Birmingham City	£75,000	
26 March 1998	GK	(Scotland)	Scott Howie	Motherwell	£30,000	
26 March 1998	DF	(Scotland)	Stuart Gray	Celtic	£100,000	
26 March 1998	MF	(Republic of Ireland)	Jim Crawford	Newcastle United	£50,000	
26 March 1998	FW	(England)	Paul Brayson	Newcastle United	£100,000	
26 March 1998	FW	(Scotland)	Robert Fleck	Norwich City	£50,000	
26 March 1998	FW	(Scotland)	Jim McIntyre	Kilmarnock	£440,000	

=== Loan in ===
Date from	Position	Nationality	Name	From	Date to	Ref.
29 August 1997	FW	(England)	Mark Robins	Leicester City	26 September 1997	
5 September 1997	DF	(England)	Lee Sandford	Sheffield United	4 October 1997	
26 February 1998	GK	(Republic of Ireland)	Nick Colgan	Chelsea	End of Season	
1 March 1998	MF	(Northern Ireland)	Michael O'Neill	Coventry City	End of Season	
26 March 1998	DF	(Scotland)	Paddy Kelly	Newcastle United	End of Season	

=== Out ===
Date	Position	Nationality	Name	To	Fee	Ref.
1 August 1997	FW	(Wales)	Lee Nogan	Grimsby Town	£100,000	
31 October 1997	FW	(England)	David Whyte	Ipswich Town	Undisclosed	
21 November 1997	MF	(England)	Paul Holsgrove	Crewe Alexandra	Undisclosed	
1 March 1998	MF	(England)	Ben Smith	Yeovil Town	Undisclosed	

=== Loan out ===
Date from	Position	Nationality	Name	To	Date to	Ref.
January 1998	FW	(England)	Neville Roach	Kingstonian	End of Season	

=== Released ===
Date	Position	Nationality	Name	Joined	Date
30 June 1998	GK	(England)	Sal Bibbo	Havant & Waterlooville	
30 June 1998	DF	(England)	Michael Thorp		
30 June 1998	DF	(England)	Steve Swales	Hull City	
30 June 1998	DF	(Poland)	Dariusz Wdowczyk	Polonia Warsaw	
30 June 1998	DF	(Wales)	Paul Bodin	Bath City	
30 June 1998	MF	(England)	Andy Freeman		
30 June 1998	MF	(England)	Alan Pardew	Retired	
30 June 1998	MF	(Wales)	Michael Meaker	Bristol Rovers	
30 June 1998	FW	(Australia)	Stuart Lovell	Hibernian	
30 June 1998	FW	(England)	Trevor Morley	Sogndal	

== Results ==
=== First Division ===
==== Results ====
9 August 1997 1	Bury	1–1	Reading	Bury
	Armstrong 52'; Daws (yellow card)	Report	Swales 13'; Lambert (yellow card)	Stadium: Gigg Lane; Attendance: 5,065; Referee: Terry Heilbron

16 August 1997 2	Reading	0–1	Swindon Town	Reading
	Wdowczyk (yellow card); Lambert (yellow card); Meaker (yellow card)	Report	Hay 18'; Robinson (yellow card)	Stadium: Elm Park; Attendance: 9,338; Referee: Andy D'Urso

23 August 1997 3	Birmingham City	3–0	Reading	Birmingham
	Devlin 38'; Bruce 81'; Ndlovu 88'; Ablett (yellow card); Furlong (yellow card)	Report	Bernal (yellow card) (yellow-red card) 68'; Booty (yellow card); Lambert (yellow card)	Stadium: St Andrew's; Attendance: 16,495; Referee: E.Lomas

30 August 1997 4	Reading	0–3	Bradford City	Reading
	McPherson (yellow card)	Report	Lawrence 10'; Pepper 17', 66'; Jacobs (yellow card); Dreyer (yellow card); Beagrie (yellow card)	Stadium: Elm Park; Attendance: 7,163; Referee: C.R.Wilkes

2 September 1997 5	Reading	1–2	Queens Park Rangers	Reading
	Hodges 10' (yellow card); Lambert (yellow card); Asaba (yellow card)	Report	Spencer 71'; Swales 72' (o.g.); Maddix (yellow card); Brevett (yellow card); Peacock (yellow card); Sinclair (yellow card)	Stadium: Elm Park; Attendance: 10,203; Referee: M.Fletcher

7 September 1997 6	West Bromwich Albion	1–0	Reading	West Bromwich
	Hunt 79'	Report	Parkinson (yellow card)	Stadium: The Hawthorns; Attendance: 15,966; Referee: Paul Danson

13 September 1997 7	Reading	2–1	Oxford United	Reading
	Asaba 21'; Hodges 61'	Report	Jemson 2'; Whelan (yellow card); Beauchamp (yellow card); Ford (yellow card); Wilsterman (yellow card)	Stadium: Elm Park; Attendance: 9,003

20 September 1997 8	Tranmere Rovers	6–0	Reading	Birkenhead
	Morrissey 4'; Kelly 10', 41'; L.Jones 20'; G.Jones 38'; Thompson 59'	Report		Stadium: Prenton Park; Attendance: 5,565; Referee: David Laws

27 September 1997 9	Portsmouth	0–2	Reading	Portsmouth
	Pethick (yellow card); Perrett (yellow card)	Report	Hodges 15'; Williams 88'; Primus (yellow card); McPherson (yellow card)	Stadium: Fratton Park; Attendance: 9,593; Referee: M.C.Bailey

4 October 1997 10	Reading	4–0	Sunderland	Reading
	Asaba 16', 26'; Williams 60'; Lambert 64'; Parkinson (yellow card)	Report	Williams (red card) 67'	Stadium: Elm Park; Attendance: 10,795; Referee: M.J.Brandwood

11 October 1997 11	Reading	3–3	Crewe Alexandra	Reading
	Asaba 35', 60' (yellow card); Westwood 43' (o.g.); Meaker (yellow card)	Report	Westwood 13' (yellow card); Little 20'; Adebola 31'; Unsworth (yellow card)	Stadium: Elm Park; Attendance: 6,685; Referee: Rob Styles

18 October 1997 12	Manchester City	0–0	Reading	Manchester
		Report	Parkinson (yellow card); Wdowczyk (yellow card)	Stadium: Maine Road; Attendance: 26,488

21 October 1997 13	Norwich City	0–0	Reading	Norwich
		Report	Swales (yellow card); Meaker (yellow card); Parkinson (yellow card); Lambert (yellow card)	Stadium: Carrow Road; Attendance: 17,781; Referee: G.Stretton

24 October 1997 14	Reading	3–3	Nottingham Forest	Reading
	Williams 57' (pen.); Lambert 73'; Primus 78'	Report	van Hooijdonk 3', 48' (pen.); Beasant (red card) 56'; Campbell 65'; Armstrong (yellow card); Bart-Williams (yellow card)	Stadium: Elm Park; Attendance: 12,610; Referee: M.J.Brandwood

1 November 1997 15	Port Vale	0–0	Reading	Stoke-on-Trent
		Report		Stadium: Vale Park; Attendance: 6,569; Referee: George Cain

4 November 1997 16	Reading	0–1	Sheffield United	Reading
	Caskey (yellow card)	Report	Patterson 52'	Stadium: Elm Park; Attendance: 8,132; Referee: Paul Danson

8 November 1997 17	Reading	1–0	Stockport County	Reading
	Morley 42' (pen.); Asaba (yellow card)	Report	McIntosh (yellow card); Cook (yellow card); Bennett (yellow card); Angell (yellow card); Searle (yellow card)	Stadium: Elm Park; Attendance: 7,444; Referee: Mark Halsey

15 November 1997 18	Huddersfield Town	1–0	Reading	Huddersfield
	Dalton 73'; Phillips (yellow card)	Report	Parkinson (yellow card)	Stadium: Alfred McAlpine Stadium; Attendance: 12,617; Referee: Bill Burns

22 November 1997 19	Reading	0–4	Ipswich Town	Reading
	Primus (yellow card)	Report	Holland 26'; Johnson 30'; Scowcroft 49'; Naylor 87'	Stadium: Elm Park; Attendance: 9,400; Referee: Anthony Leake

29 November 1997 20	Stoke City	1–2	Reading	Stoke-on-Trent
	Thorne 81' (yellow card)	Report	Morley 32' (pen.), 59'; Booty (yellow card)	Stadium: Britannia Stadium; Attendance: 11,103; Referee: T.Jones

6 December 1997 21	Reading	2–0	Charlton Athletic	Reading
	Hodges 9' Morley 36' (pen.); Booty (yellow card); Swales (yellow card); Lambert (yellow card)	Report	Rufus (yellow card); Chapple (yellow card); Robinson (yellow card)	Stadium: Elm Park; Attendance: 8,076; Referee: Scott Mathieson

13 December 1997 22	Middlesbrough	4–0	Reading	Middlesbrough
	Hignett 77', 90' (yellow card); Beck 79', 84'; Festa (yellow card)	Report	Parkinson (yellow card)	Stadium: Riverside Stadium; Attendance: 29,876; Referee: Chris Foy

20 December 1997 23	Reading	0–0	Wolverhampton Wanderers	Reading
	Bodin (red card) 37'; Bernal (yellow card); Williams (yellow card); Morley (yellow card)	Report	Simpson (red card) 42'; Curle (yellow card); Froggatt (yellow card); Goodman (yellow card); Keane (yellow card)	Stadium: Elm Park; Attendance: 11,715; Referee: Steve Bennett

26 December 1997 24	Reading	2–1	West Bromwich Albion	Reading
	McDermott 1' (o.g.); Williams (27)) (yellow card)	Report	Kilbane 77'; Hamilton (yellow card); Butler (yellow card)	Stadium: Elm Park; Attendance: 10,154; Referee: Andy D'Urso

28 December 1997 25	Queens Park Rangers	1–1	Reading	White City
	Spencer 15'; Maddix (red card) 78'	Report	Morley 64' (yellow card); Asaba (red card) 78'; Caskey (yellow card)	Stadium: Loftus Road; Attendance: 13,015; Referee: Barry Knight

10 January 1998 26	Reading	1–1	Bury	Reading
	Lucketti 29' (o.g.)	Report	Jepson (red card) 76'; Gray 87'; Patterson (yellow card)	Stadium: Elm Park; Attendance: 7,499; Referee: M.E.Pierce

17 January 1998 27	Swindon Town	0–2	Reading	Swindon
	Borrows (yellow card); McDonald (yellow card); Collins (yellow card)	Report	Lovell 9'; Lambert 14'; Booty (yellow card); Swales (yellow card)	Stadium: The County Ground; Attendance: 9,500; Referee: E.Lomas

27 January 1998 28	Bradford City	4–1	Reading	Bradford
	Lawrence 24'; Edinho 32', 68'; Blake 62'; Wilder (yellow card)	Report	Asaba 2'; Swales (yellow card); Bowen (yellow card)	Stadium: Valley Parade; Attendance: 13,021; Referee: Graham Laws

31 January 1998 29	Reading	2–0	Birmingham City	Reading
	Hodges 74'; Asaba 83'	Report	Furlong (yellow card) (yellow-red card) 66'; Marsden (red card) 69'; Ablett (yellow card); Bruce (yellow card) 81'	Stadium: Elm Park; Attendance: 10,315; Referee: Paul Rejer

7 February 1998 30	Reading	1–3	Tranmere Rovers	Reading
	Williams 75'; Morley (yellow card)	Report	Irons 10'; Kelly 65'; Branch 72'; Morrissey (yellow card)	Stadium: Elm Park; Attendance: 7,069

17 February 1998 31	Sunderland	4–1	Reading	Sunderland
	Quinn 21'; Rae 22'; Phillips 46', 61'	Report	Bowen 53'	Stadium: Stadium of Light; Attendance: 40,579; Referee: J.A.Kirkby

21 February 1998 32	Reading	0–1	Portsmouth	Reading
	Legg (yellow card); Morley (yellow card)	Report	Whitbread 83'; Pethick (yellow card)	Stadium: Elm Park; Attendance: 9,928; Referee: Alan Wiley

24 February 1998 33	Reading	3–0	Manchester City	Reading
	Hodges 8'; Houghton 29'; Asaba 89'; Parkinson (yellow card); Williams (yellow card)	Report	Symons (yellow card); Whitley (yellow card); Brown (yellow card); Dickov (yellow card)	Stadium: Elm Park; Attendance: 11,513; Referee: Anthony Bates

28 February 1998 34	Crewe Alexandra	1–0	Reading	Crewe
	Rivers 11'; Lightfoot (yellow card)	Report	Bowen (yellow card)	Stadium: Gresty Road; Attendance: 5,202; Referee: K.M.Lynch

3 March 1998 35	Stockport County	5–1	Reading	Stockport
	Byrne 10', 32'; Angell 11', 70'; Grant 23'	Report	Williams 80' (pen.); Caskey (yellow card)	Stadium: Edgeley Park; Attendance: 6,148; Referee: T.Jones

7 March 1998 36	Reading	0–3	Port Vale	Reading
	Primus (yellow card); Bernal (yellow card); Davies (yellow card); Houghton (yellow card); Legg (yellow card)	Report	Mills 7' (yellow card); Talbot 19'; Jansson 82'; Porter (yellow card); Ainsworth (yellow card)	Stadium: Elm Park; Attendance: 7,139; Referee: Mark Halsey

14 March 1998 37	Sheffield United	4–0	Reading	Sheffield
	Stuart 44'; Marcelo 46'; Taylor 54'; Quinn 90'; Borbokis (yellow card)	Report	Davies (yellow card)	Stadium: Bramall Lane; Attendance: 15,473; Referee: Chris Foy

17 March 1998 38	Oxford United	3–0	Reading	Oxford
	Beauchamp 44', 70'; Gray 77'; Marsh (yellow card); Smith (yellow card); Francis (yellow card)	Report	O'Neill (yellow card); Parkinson (yellow card); Lambert (yellow card)	Stadium: Manor Ground; Attendance: 8,103; Referee: M.Fletcher

21 March 1998 39	Reading	0–2	Huddersfield Town	Reading
	Davies (yellow card); Lovell (yellow card)	Report	Stewart 73', 88' (yellow card); Johnson (yellow card); Nielsen (yellow card)	Stadium: Elm Park; Attendance: 8,593; Referee: Paul Taylor

28 March 1998 40	Ipswich Town	1–0	Reading	Ipswich
	Scowcroft 39'; Petta (yellow card); Johnson (yellow card)	Report	Legg (yellow card) (yellow-red card) 45'; Bernal (yellow card) (yellow-red card) 68'; Primus (yellow card); Fleck (yellow card); McIntyre (yellow card)	Stadium: Portman Road; Attendance: 19,075; Referee: B.Coddington

4 April 1998 41	Reading	2–0	Stoke City	Reading
	O'Neill 32'; Meaker 48'; Lambert (yellow card)	Report	Forsyth (yellow card); Crowe (yellow card)	Stadium: Elm Park; Attendance: 10,448; Referee: G.Stretton

10 April 1998 42	Charlton Athletic	3–0	Reading	Charlton
	Mendonca 6'; Mortimer 44'; Bright 79'; Youds (yellow card); Barness (yellow card); Jones (yellow card)	Report	Caskey (yellow card)	Stadium: The Valley; Attendance: 14,220; Referee: M.E.Pierce

13 April 1998 43	Reading	0–1	Middlesbrough	Reading
	McIntyre (yellow card)	Report	Branca 8'; Hignett (red card) 90'; Festa (yellow card)	Stadium: Elm Park; Attendance: 14,501; Referee: Barry Knight

18 April 1998 44	Wolverhampton Wanderers	3–1	Reading	Wolverhampton
	Muscat 9'; Goodman 69', 90'	Report	Brayson 44'	Stadium: Molineux; Attendance: 19,785; Referee: Terry Heilbron

26 April 1998 45	Nottingham Forest	1–0	Reading	West Bridgford
	Bart-Williams 87'; Rogers (yellow card)	Report	Primus (yellow card); Lovell (yellow card)	Stadium: City Ground; Attendance: 29,302; Referee: G.B.Frankland

3 May 1998 46	Reading	0–1	Norwich City	Reading
		Report	Bellamy 57' (yellow card); Jackson (yellow card)	Stadium: Elm Park; Attendance: 14,817; Referee: T.Jones

==== Table ====
Pos	Team	Pld	W	D	L	GF	GA	GD	Pts	Qualification or relegation
20	Portsmouth	46	13	10	23	51	63	−12	49	
21	Queens Park Rangers	46	10	19	17	51	63	−12	49	
22	Manchester City (R)	46	12	12	22	56	57	−1	48	Relegation to the Second Division
23	Stoke City (R)	46	11	13	22	44	74	−30	46	Relegation to the Second Division
24	Reading (R)	46	11	9	26	39	78	−39	42	Relegation to the Second Division

Source: Statto.com
Rules for classification: 1) Points; 2) Goals scored; 3) Goal difference
(R) Relegated

=== FA Cup ===
13 January 1998 Third Round	Cheltenham Town	1–1	Reading	Cheltenham
19:45 GMT (UTC)	Watkins 22' (pen.); M.Freeman (yellow card)	Report	Morley 71' (yellow card); Bowen (yellow card)	Stadium: Whaddon Road; Attendance: 6,000

20 January 1998 Third Round Reply	Reading	2–1	Cheltenham Town	Reading
19:45 GMT (UTC)	Morley 38'; Booty 72'	Report	Walker 51'; B.Bloomer (yellow card)	Stadium: Elm Park; Attendance: 9,686

24 January 1998 Fourth Round	Cardiff City	1–1	Reading	Cardiff
15:00 GMT (UTC)	Nugent 47'; Middleton (yellow card); Carss (yellow card); Penney (yellow card)	Report	Asaba 56'; Lambert (yellow card)	Stadium: Ninian Park; Attendance: 10,174; Referee: Stephen Lodge

3 February 1998 Fourth Round Reply	Reading	1–1 (a.e.t.) (4–3 p)	Cardiff City	Reading
19:45 GMT (UTC)	Morley 56'; Bernal (yellow card); Booty (yellow card); Bowen (yellow card)	Report	Dale 40'; Harris (yellow card); Middleton (yellow card); Penney (yellow card)	Stadium: Elm Park; Attendance: 11,808; Referee: Stephen Lodge

13 February 1998 Fifth Round	Sheffield United	1–0	Reading	Sheffield
15:00 GMT (UTC)	Sandford 87'; Stuart (yellow card); Taylor (yellow card)	Report		Stadium: Bramall Lane; Attendance: 17,845; Referee: Neale Barry

=== League Cup ===
12 August 1997 First Round 1st leg	Reading	2–0	Swansea City	Reading
BST (UTC+1)	Lambert 58'; Roach 75'	Report	Price (yellow card)	Stadium: Elm Park; Attendance: 4,829; Referee: Paul Taylor

26 August 1997 First Round 2nd leg	Swansea City	1–1 (1–3 agg.)	Reading	Swansea
BST (UTC+1)	J.Coates 49'; C.Edwards (red card) 78'; Moreira (yellow card)	Report	Asaba 54'; Booty (yellow card); Lambert (yellow card); M.Williams (yellow card)	Stadium: Vetch Field; Attendance: 3,333; Referee: Jarnail Singh

16 September 1997 Second Round 1st leg	Reading	0–0	Peterborough United	Reading
BST (UTC+1)	Booty (yellow card)	Report	Quinn (yellow card)	Stadium: Elm Park; Attendance: 5,138

23 September 1997 Second Round 2nd leg	Peterborough United	0–2 (0–2 agg.)	Reading	Peterborough
BST (UTC+1)	Payne (red card) 1'; Bodley (yellow card)	Report	Asaba 51'; M.Williams 70'	Stadium: London Road; Attendance: 3,333; Referee: R.D.Furnandiz

14 October 1997 Third Round	Reading	4–2	Wolverhampton Wanderers	Reading
BST (UTC+1)	A. Williams 33' (o.g.); Parkinson 34'; Meaker 46'; McPherson 54'	Report	Bull 44', 57'; Curle (yellow card); A. Williams (yellow card); Atkins (yellow card); Ferguson (yellow card)	Stadium: Elm Park; Attendance: 11,080; Referee: C.R.Wilkes

18 November 1998 Fourth Round	Leeds United	2–3	Reading	Leeds
GMT (UTC)	Wetherall 16'; Bowyer 54'; Ribeiro (yellow card)	Report	Asaba 9'; M.Williams 66'; Morley 85' (yellow card); McPherson (yellow card)	Stadium: Elland Road; Attendance: 15,069; Referee: Graham Barber

6 January 1998 Fifth Round	Reading	0–1	Middlesbrough	Reading
GMT (UTC)	Morley (yellow card)	Report	Hignett 89' (yellow card)	Stadium: Elm Park; Attendance: 13,072; Referee: George Cain

== Squad statistics ==
As of match played 3 May 1998

=== Appearances and goals ===
No.	Pos	Nat	Player	Total		First Division		FA Cup		League Cup	
No.	Pos	Nat	Player	Apps	Goals	Apps	Goals	Apps	Goals	Apps	Goals
	GK	(Australia) AUS	Steve Mautone	19	0	14	0	0	0	5	0
	GK	(England) ENG	Sal Bibbo	3	0	2	0	1	0	0	0
	GK	(England) ENG	Nick Hammond	24	0	18	0	4	0	2	0
	GK	(Republic of Ireland) IRL	Nick Colgan	5	0	5	0	0	0	0	0
	GK	(Scotland) SCO	Scott Howie	7	0	7	0	0	0	0	0
	DF	(Australia) AUS	Andy Bernal	45	0	34	0	5	0	6	0
	DF	(England) ENG	Martyn Booty	35	1	24+1	0	5	1	4+1	0
	DF	(England) ENG	Keith McPherson	30	1	24	0	0	0	6	1
	DF	(England) ENG	Linvoy Primus	43	1	36	1	1	0	6	0
	DF	(England) ENG	Steve Swales	42	1	26+5	1	5	0	6	0
	DF	(England) ENG	Michael Thorp	4	0	0+3	0	0+1	0	0	0
	DF	(Poland) POL	Dariusz Wdowczyk	8	0	3+3	0	0	0	1+1	0
	DF	(Scotland) SCO	Stuart Gray	7	0	7	0	0	0	0	0
	DF	(Scotland) SCO	Paddy Kelly	3	0	3	0	0	0	0	0
	DF	(Wales) WAL	Paul Bodin	6	0	3+1	0	1	0	1	0
	DF	(Wales) WAL	Gareth Davies	22	0	17+1	0	3	0	1	0
	DF	(Wales) WAL	Andy Legg	10	0	10	0	0	0	0	0
	MF	(England) ENG	Darren Caskey	26	0	19+4	0	0+1	0	1+1	0
	MF	(England) ENG	Lee Hodges	35	6	20+4	6	4+1	0	5+1	0
	MF	(England) ENG	Byron Glasgow	3	0	1+2	0	0	0	0	0
	MF	(England) ENG	Jamie Lambert	43	4	33+1	3	3	0	6	1
	MF	(England) ENG	Phil Parkinson	47	1	36+1	0	5	0	5	1
	MF	(Northern Ireland) NIR	Michael O'Neill	9	1	9	1	0	0	0	0
	MF	(Republic of Ireland) IRL	Jim Crawford	6	0	5+1	0	0	0	0	0
	MF	(Republic of Ireland) IRL	Ray Houghton	35	1	20+5	1	2+2	0	5+1	0
	MF	(Wales) WAL	Michael Meaker	26	2	16+5	1	0+2	0	3	1
	FW	(Australia) AUS	Stuart Lovell	18	1	8+7	1	2+1	0	0	0
	FW	(England) ENG	Carl Asaba	42	12	31+1	8	3	1	7	3
	FW	(England) ENG	Paul Brayson	6	1	2+4	1	0	0	0	0
	FW	(England) ENG	Trevor Morley	30	9	17+6	5	5	3	2	1
	FW	(England) ENG	Martin Williams	37	8	25+4	6	1+1	0	4+2	2
	FW	(Scotland) SCO	Robert Fleck	5	0	3+2	0	0	0	0	0
	FW	(Scotland) SCO	Jim McIntyre	6	0	6	0	0	0	0	0
	FW	(Wales) WAL	Jason Bowen	20	1	11+3	1	5	0	0+1	0
Players away on loan:
	FW	(England) ENG	Neville Roach	13	1	0+8	0	0	0	1+4	1
Players who appeared for Reading but left during the season:
	DF	(England) ENG	Lee Sandford	5	0	5	0	0	0	0	0
	MF	(England) ENG	Paul Holsgrove	3	0	1+1	0	0	0	0+1	0
	FW	(England) ENG	Mark Robins	5	0	5	0	0	0	0	0

=== Goal scorers ===
Place	Position	Nation	Name	First Division	FA Cup	League Cup	Total
1	FW	(England)	Carl Asaba	8	1	3	12
2	FW	(England)	Trevor Morley	5	3	1	9
3	FW	(England)	Martin Williams	6	0	2	8
4	MF	(England)	Lee Hodges	6	0	0	6
5	MF	(England)	Jamie Lambert	3	0	1	4
5			Own goal	3	0	1	4
7	MF	(England)	Michael Meaker	1	0	1	2
8	MF	(Wales)	Jason Bowen	1	0	0	1
8	FW	(England)	Paul Brayson	1	0	0	1
8	MF	(Republic of Ireland)	Ray Houghton	1	0	0	1
8	FW	(Australia)	Stuart Lovell	1	0	0	1
8	MF	(Northern Ireland)	Michael O'Neill	1	0	0	1
8	DF	(England)	Linvoy Primus	1	0	0	1
8	DF	(England)	Steve Swales	1	0	0	1
8	DF	(England)	Martyn Booty	0	1	0	1
8	DF	(England)	Keith McPherson	0	0	1	1
8	MF	(England)	Phil Parkinson	0	0	1	1
8	FW	(England)	Neville Roach	0	0	1	1
Total				39	5	12	56

=== Clean sheets ===
Place	Position	Nation	Name	First Division	FA Cup	League Cup	Total
1	GK	(England)	Nick Hammond	7	0	0	7
2	GK	(Australia)	Steve Mautone	4	0	0	4
3	GK	(Scotland)	Scott Howie	1	0	0	1
TOTALS				12	0	0	12

=== Disciplinary record ===
Position	Nation	Name	First Division		FA Cup		League Cup		Total	
Position	Nation	Name	Booked	Sent off (straight red)	Booked	Sent off (straight red)	Booked	Sent off (straight red)	Booked	Sent off (straight red)
DF	(Australia)	Andy Bernal	6	2	0	0	0	0	6	2
DF	(England)	Martyn Booty	4	0	1	0	2	0	7	0
DF	(England)	Keith McPherson	2	0	0	0	1	0	3	0
DF	(England)	Linvoy Primus	5	0	0	0	0	0	5	0
DF	(England)	Steve Swales	4	0	1	0	0	0	5	0
DF	(Poland)	Dariusz Wdowczyk	2	0	0	0	0	0	2	0
DF	(Wales)	Paul Bodin	0	1	0	0	0	0	0	1
DF	(Wales)	Gareth Davies	3	0	0	0	0	0	3	0
DF	(Wales)	Andy Legg	4	1	0	0	0	0	4	1
MF	(England)	Darren Caskey	4	0	0	0	0	0	4	0
MF	(England)	Lee Hodges	1	0	0	0	0	0	1	0
MF	(England)	Jamie Lambert	8	0	1	0	1	0	10	0
MF	(England)	Phil Parkinson	8	0	0	0	0	0	8	0
MF	(Northern Ireland)	Michael O'Neill	1	0	0	0	0	0	1	0
MF	(Republic of Ireland)	Ray Houghton	1	0	0	0	0	0	1	0
MF	(Wales)	Michael Meaker	3	0	0	0	0	0	3	0
FW	(Australia)	Stuart Lovell	2	0	0	0	0	0	2	0
FW	(England)	Carl Asaba	3	1	0	0	0	0	3	1
FW	(England)	Trevor Morley	4	0	1	0	2	0	7	0
FW	(England)	Martin Williams	3	0	0	0	1	0	4	0
FW	(Scotland)	Robert Fleck	1	0	0	0	0	0	1	0
FW	(Scotland)	Jim McIntyre	2	0	0	0	0	0	2	0
FW	(Wales)	Jason Bowen	2	0	2	0	0	0	4	0
Players away on loan:
Players who left Reading during the season:
Total			73	5	6	0	7	0	86	5
