= 1996–97 Reading F.C. season =

Reading
1996–97 season
- Chairman: John Madejski
- Manager: Mick Gooding and Jimmy Quinn (player-managers)
- Stadium: Elm Park
- First Division: 18th
- FA Cup: Fourth Round vs Portsmouth
- League Cup: First Round vs Wycombe Wanderers
- Top goalscorer: League: Trevor Morley (22); All: Trevor Morley (23)
- Highest home attendance: 14,853 (vs. Wolverhampton Wanderers, 12 April 1997)
- Lowest home attendance: 5,513 (vs. Tranmere Rovers, 3 December 1996)
- Average home league attendance: 9,160
Home colours

During the 1996–97 English football season, Reading F.C. competed in the Football League First Division.

== Season summary ==
The 1996–97 season was another struggle for Reading, but they managed to secure survival on 12 April 1997, after beating promotion-chasing Wolves 2–1 at Elm Park.

== Squad ==
As of match played 3 May 1997

Name	Nationality	Position	Date of birth (Age (Note: Age as of the end of the season))	Signed from	Signed in	Contract ends	Apps.	Goals
Goalkeepers
Steve Mautone	(Australia)	GK	10 August 1970 (aged 26)	West Ham United	1997		15	0
Sal Bibbo	(England)	GK	24 August 1974 (aged 22)	Sheffield United	1996		6	0
Nick Hammond	(England)	GK	7 September 1967 (aged 29)	Plymouth Argyle	1996		7	0
Defenders
Andy Bernal	(Australia)	DF	21 February 1973 (aged 24)	Sydney Olympic	1994		129	2
Steve Blatherwick	(England)	DF	20 September 1973 (aged 23)	loan from Nottingham Forest	1997	1997	7	0
Martyn Booty	(England)	DF	30 May 1971 (aged 25)	Crewe Alexandra	1996		35	1
Keith McPherson	(England)	DF	11 September 1963 (aged 33)	Northampton Town	1990			
Steve Swales	(England)	DF	26 December 1973 (aged 23)	Scarborough	1995		14	0
Michael Thorp	(England)	DF	5 December 1975 (aged 21)	Trainee	1995		5	0
Barry Hunter	(Northern Ireland)	DF	18 November 1968 (aged 28)	Wrexham	1996		29	2
Dariusz Wdowczyk	(Poland)	DF	25 September 1962 (aged 34)	Celtic	1994		96	0
Paul Bodin	(Wales)	DF	13 September 1964 (aged 32)	Swindon Town	1996		39	1
Jeff Hopkins	(Wales)	DF	14 April 1964 (aged 33)	Bristol Rovers	1992		155	3
Midfielders
David Bass	(England)	MF	29 November 1974 (aged 22)	Trainee	1992		11	0
Darren Caskey	(England)	MF	21 August 1974 (aged 22)	Tottenham Hotspur	1996		53	3
Andy Freeman	(England)	MF	8 September 1977 (aged 19)	Trainee	1995		1	0
Byron Glasgow	(England)	MF	18 February 1979 (aged 18)	Trainee	1996		5	0
Mick Gooding (Player-Manager)	(England)	MF	12 April 1959 (aged 38)	Wolverhampton Wanderers	1989			
Paul Holsgrove	(England)	MF	26 August 1969 (aged 27)	Millwall	1994		83	7
Jamie Lambert	(England)	MF	14 September 1973 (aged 23)	Trainee	1992		108	16
Phil Parkinson	(England)	MF	1 December 1967 (aged 29)	Bury	1992		208	10
Ben Smith	(England)	MF	23 November 1978 (aged 18)	Arsenal	1996		1	0
Derek Simpson	(Scotland)	MF	23 December 1978 (aged 18)	Trainee	1994		0	0
Michael Meaker	(Wales) (Note: Michael Meaker was born in Greenford, England, but also qualified to represent Wales internationally, representing Wales U21 and Wales B.)	MF	18 August 1971 (aged 25)	Queens Park Rangers	1995		47	1
Forwards
Stuart Lovell	(Australia)	FW	9 January 1972 (aged 25)	Trainee	1990			
Alan Carey	(England)	FW	21 August 1975 (aged 21)	Trainee	1994		3	0
Trevor Morley	(England)	FW	20 March 1961 (aged 36)	West Ham United	1995		61	29
Neville Roach	(England)	FW	29 September 1978 (aged 18)	Trainee	1996		3	1
Martin Williams	(England)	FW	12 July 1973 (aged 23)	Luton Town	1995		49	4
Jimmy Quinn (Player-Manager)	(Northern Ireland)	FW	7 December 1959 (aged 37)	Bournemouth	1992		216	94
Lee Nogan	(Wales)	FW	21 May 1969 (aged 27)	Watford	1995		102	29
Out on loan
Left during the season
Borislav Mihaylov	(Bulgaria)	GK	12 February 1963 (aged 34)	Botev Plovdiv	1995		28	0
Tommy Wright	(Northern Ireland)	GK	29 August 1963 (aged 33)	loan from Nottingham Forest	1996	1996	17	0
Kenny Brown	(England)	DF	11 July 1967 (aged 29)	loan from West Ham United	1996	1996	20	1
Dylan Kerr	(Malta)	DF	14 January 1967 (aged 30)	Leeds United	1993		104	5
Michael Gilkes	(England) (Note: Michael Gilkes was born in Hackney, England, but also qualified to represent Barbados internationally and would make his international debut for Barbados in 2000.)	MF	20 July 1965 (aged 31)	Leicester City	1984			
Jimmy Garrity	(England)		1 January 1976 (aged 21)	Newcastle United	1996		0	0

=== Left club during season ===
Note: Flags indicate national team as defined under FIFA eligibility rules; some limited exceptions apply. Players may hold more than one non-FIFA nationality.

No.	Pos.	Nation	Player
—	GK	(Bulgaria) BUL	Borislav Mihaylov
—	GK	(Northern Ireland) NIR	Tommy Wright (loan return to Nottingham Forest)
—	DF	(England) ENG	Kenny Brown (loan return to West Ham United)

No.	Pos.	Nation	Player
—	DF	(Malta) MLT	Dylan Kerr (to Carlisle United)
—	MF	(England) ENG	Michael Gilkes (to Wolverhampton Wanderers)
—		(England) ENG	Jimmy Garrity

== Transfers ==
=== In ===
Date	Position	Nationality	Name	From	Fee	Ref.
11 July 1996	DF	(Wales)	Paul Bodin	Swindon Town	Free	
12 July 1996	DF	(Northern Ireland)	Barry Hunter	Wrexham	£400,000	
1 August 1996	GK	(England)	Sal Bibbo	Sheffield United	Free	
1 August 1996	MF	(England)	Ben Smith	Arsenal	Free	
27 March 1997	GK	(Australia)	Steve Mautone	West Ham United	£250,000	

=== Loans in ===
Date from	Position	Nationality	Name	From	Date to	Ref.
9 September 1996	DF	(England)	Kenny Brown	West Ham United	5 October 1996	
4 October 1996	GK	(England)	Tommy Wright	Nottingham Forest	28 December 1996	
17 February 1997	GK	(Australia)	Steve Mautone	West Ham United	26 March 1997	
27 March 1997	DF	(England)	Steve Blatherwick	Nottingham Forest	End of Season	

=== Out ===
Date	Position	Nationality	Name	To	Fee	Ref.
3 July 1996	DF	(Wales)	Ady Williams	Wolverhampton Wanderers	£750,000	
27 March 1997	MF	(England)	Michael Gilkes	Wolverhampton Wanderers	£50,000	

=== Loans out ===
Date from	Position	Nationality	Name	To	Date to	Ref.
14 February 1997	FW	(Wales)	Lee Nogan	Notts County	15 March 1997	

=== Released ===
Date	Position	Nationality	Name	Joined	Date
16 September 1996	DF	(Malta)	Dylan Kerr	Carlisle United	16 September 1996
December 1995		(England)	Jimmy Garrity		
6 March 1997	GK	(Bulgaria)	Borislav Mihaylov	Slavia Sofia	1 August 1997
9 May 1997	MF	(England)	Mick Gooding	Southend United	1 July 1998
9 May 1997	FW	(Northern Ireland)	Jimmy Quinn	Peterborough United	1 July 1997
30 June 1997	DF	(Wales)	Jeff Hopkins	Selangor	
30 June 1997	MF	(England)	David Bass		
30 June 1997	MF	(England)	Andy Freeman		
30 June 1997	MF	(Scotland)	Derek Simpson	Slough Town	
30 June 1997	FW	(England)	Alan Carey		

== Competitions ==
=== First Division ===
==== Results ====
17 August 1996 1	Reading	1–0	Sheffield United	Reading
	Bernal (yellow card) (yellow-red card) 80'; Quinn 82'; Parkinson (yellow card)	Report	Patterson (yellow card)	Stadium: Elm Park; Attendance: 11,081

24 August 1996 2	Ipswich Town	5–2	Reading	Ipswich
	Vaughan 13', 69'; Sedgley 45' (pen.); Taricco 72'; Scowcroft 87'; Stockwell (yellow card)	Report	Nogan 28'; Mihaylov (red card) 45'; Hunter 62' (yellow card); Gooding (yellow card); Quinn (yellow card)	Stadium: Portman Road; Attendance: 9,767

28 August 1996 3	Barnsley	3–0	Reading	Barnsley
	Sheridan 24'; Liddell 37', 82'	Report	Bernal (red card) 80'	Stadium: Oakwell; Attendance: 7,523

31 August 1996 4	Reading	2–2	Stoke City	Reading
	Morley 7' (pen.); Holsgrove 79'	Report	Sheron 25'; Forsyth 68'; Dreyer (yellow card)	Stadium: Elm Park; Attendance: 8,414

8 September 1996 5	Reading	2–0	Oxford United	Reading
	Williams 14'; Morley 83'	Report	Elliott (yellow card); Massey (yellow card)	Stadium: Elm Park; Attendance: 8,497

10 September 1996 6	West Bromwich Albion	3–2	Reading	West Bromwich
	Hunt 35', 45', 66'	Report	Morley 4' (pen.); Parkinson 75'	Stadium: The Hawthorns; Attendance: 13,096

14 September 1996 7	Charlton Athletic	1–0	Reading	Charlton
	Leaburn 6'; Mortimer (yellow card)	Report	Brown (yellow card); McPherson (yellow card)	Stadium: The Valley; Attendance: 10,831

21 September 1996 8	Reading	1–6	Crystal Palace	Reading
	Hunter (yellow card) (yellow-red card) 55'; Morley 69' (pen.) (yellow card); Brown (yellow card); Gilkes (yellow card); Lambert (yellow card)	Report	Tuttle 27'; Freedman 37' (yellow card); Muscat 50'; Dyer 56' (pen.); Veart 58'; Roberts (red card) 60'; Ndah 77'; Houghton (yellow card)	Stadium: Elm Park; Attendance: 9,675

28 September 1996 9	Huddersfield Town	1–0	Reading	Huddersfield
	Payton 34'	Report	Bernal (yellow card); Morley (yellow card)	Stadium: Alfred McAlpine Stadium; Attendance: 10,330

5 October 1996 10	Wolverhampton Wanderers	0–1	Reading	Wolverhampton
		Report	Lambert 69'	Stadium: Molineux; Attendance: 23,193

12 October 1996 11	Reading	1–1	Grimsby Town	Reading
	Morley 57' (pen.)	Report	Wrack 83'; Pearcey (yellow card)	Stadium: Elm Park; Attendance: 6,656

15 October 1996 12	Reading	2–0	Manchester City	Reading
	Nogan 35', 67'; Hopkins (yellow card); Gooding (yellow card)	Report	Lomas (yellow card) (yellow-red card) 82'; Symons (yellow card); Wassall (yellow card); Kinkladze (yellow card)	Stadium: Elm Park; Attendance: 11,724

19 October 1996 13	Oldham Athletic	1–1	Reading	Oldham
	Orlygsson 65' (pen.)	Report	Quinn 75' (pen.); Bodin (yellow card)	Stadium: Boundary Park; Attendance: 7,171

26 October 1996 14	Reading	2–0	Swindon Town	Reading
	Morley 51' (pen.), 60' (yellow card)	Report	Talia (yellow card); Culverhouse (yellow card); Robinson (yellow card)	Stadium: Elm Park; Attendance: 11,018

29 October 1996 15	Bolton Wanderers	2–1	Reading	Bolton
	Sellars 40'; McGinlay 58'; Branagan (yellow card) 63' (yellow-red card); Thompson (yellow card)	Report	Lambert 51'; Hunter (yellow card); McPherson (yellow card); Nogan (yellow card)	Stadium: Burnden Park; Attendance: 12,677

2 November 1996 16	Southend United	2–1	Reading	Southend-on-Sea
	Nielsen 63'; Marsh 70' (pen.); Harris (yellow card)	Report	Nogan 50'; Gooding (yellow card); Lambert (yellow card)	Stadium: Roots Hall; Attendance: 5,002

16 November 1996 17	Norwich City	1–1	Reading	Norwich
	Scott 79'; O'Neill (yellow card); Milligan (yellow card); Fleck (yellow card)	Report	Morley 56'; Gooding (yellow card) (yellow-red card) 69'; Wright (yellow card); Hunter (yellow card); McPherson (yellow card); Parkinson (yellow card); Williams (yellow card)	Stadium: Carrow Road; Attendance: 14,412

23 November 1996 18	Reading	2–1	Queens Park Rangers	Reading
	Morley 73'; Nogan 80'; Hunter (yellow card); Meaker (yellow card)	Report	Spencer 49'; McDonald (yellow card); Barker (yellow card)	Stadium: Elm Park; Attendance: 12,847

26 November 1996 19	Reading	0–0	Birmingham City	Reading
	Hunter (yellow card)	Report	Holland (yellow card)	Stadium: Elm Park; Attendance: 8,407

30 November 1996 20	Swindon Town	3–1	Reading	Swindon
	Horlock 5'; Allison 25'; Walters 87' (yellow card); Leitch (yellow card)	Report	Morley 13'; Meaker (yellow card)	Stadium: The County Ground; Attendance: 10,874

3 December 1996 21	Reading	2–0	Tranmere Rovers	Reading
	Lambert 10' (yellow card); Morley 33'	Report	Mahon (yellow card); Brannan (yellow card)	Stadium: Elm Park; Attendance: 5,513

7 December 1996 22	Reading	0–1	Port Vale	Reading
	Bernal (yellow card); Swales (yellow card)	Report	Talbot 73'; Tankard (yellow card); McCarthy (yellow card); Jansson (yellow card)	Stadium: Elm Park; Attendance: 6,445

17 December 1996 23	Bradford City	0–0	Reading	Bradford
		Report		Stadium: Valley Parade; Attendance: 10,077

21 December 1996 24	Reading	0–0	Portsmouth	Reading
	Hunter (yellow card) (yellow-red card) 79'	Report	Svensson (red card) 79'	Stadium: Elm Park; Attendance: 8,520

26 December 1996 25	Reading	2–2	West Bromwich Albion	Reading
	Nogan 8'; Quinn 73'; Bernal (yellow card) (yellow-red card) 77'	Report	Peschisolido 3'; Groves 39'; Burgess (yellow card); Holmes (yellow card)	Stadium: Elm Park; Attendance: 10,583

28 December 1996 26	Oxford United	2–1	Reading	Oxford
	Beauchamp 7'; Murphy 81'	Report	Morley 89'	Stadium: Manor Ground; Attendance: 9,223

11 January 1997 27	Reading	2–2	Charlton Athletic	Reading
	Williams 26'; Lambert 74'	Report	Lisbie 68'; Whyte 81'; Newton (yellow card)	Stadium: Elm Park; Attendance: 7,614

18 January 1997 28	Birmingham City	4–1	Reading	Birmingham
	Furlong 33'; Devlin 56' (pen.), 75'; Gilkes 89' (o.g.); Bruce (yellow card)	Report	Holsgrove 51'	Stadium: St Andrew's; Attendance: 15,363

28 January 1997 29	Reading	4–1	Huddersfield Town	Reading
	Morley 13'; McPherson 15'; Hunter 30'; Lovell 82'; Gooding (yellow card)	Report	Payton 9'; Jenkins (yellow card); Dyson (yellow card); Bullock (yellow card); Dalton (yellow card); Crosby (yellow card)	Stadium: Elm Park; Attendance: 5,710

1 February 1997 30	Tranmere Rovers	2–2	Reading	Birkenhead
	Branch 14'; Thomas-Moore 72'; Cook (yellow card); Thorn (yellow card)	Report	Morley 21', 42'; Bodin (yellow card); Quinn (yellow card)	Stadium: Prenton Park; Attendance: 6,019

8 February 1997 31	Reading	3–2	Bolton Wanderers	Reading
	Morley 56', 62' (pen.), 70'	Report	Thompson 61' (yellow card); McGinlay 64'; Bergsson (yellow card); Frandsen (yellow card)	Stadium: Elm Park; Attendance: 10,739

22 February 1997 32	Reading	3–2	Southend United	Reading
	McPherson 33'; Gilkes 60'; Morley 76'; Meaker (yellow card)	Report	Boere 54', 71' (yellow card); McNally (yellow card); Gridelet (yellow card); Marsh (yellow card)	Stadium: Elm Park; Attendance: 7,683

1 March 1997 33	Port Vale	1–0	Reading	Stoke-on-Trent
	Naylor 45'; Foyle (yellow card); Aspin (yellow card); Talbot (yellow card)	Report	Hunter (yellow card); Parkinson (yellow card)	Stadium: Vale Park; Attendance: 6,057

4 March 1997 34	Reading	2–1	Norwich City	Reading
	Morley 20'; Adams 86' (o.g.); Gooding (yellow card); Meaker (yellow card)	Report	Adams 27' (pen.) (yellow card); Crook (yellow card)	Stadium: Elm Park; Attendance: 8,174

12 March 1997 35	Queens Park Rangers	0–2	Reading	White City
	Ready (yellow card) (yellow-red card) 55'	Report	Morley 2'; Maddix 76' (o.g.); Hunter (yellow card)	Stadium: Loftus Road; Attendance: 10,316

15 March 1997 36	Reading	0–0	Bradford City	Reading
	Parkinson (yellow card)	Report		Stadium: Elm Park; Attendance: 8,435

22 March 1997 37	Reading	1–0	Ipswich Town	Reading
	Lovell 90'; Hopkins (yellow card)	Report	Taricco (yellow card); Vaughan (yellow card)	Stadium: Elm Park; Attendance: 10,058

25 March 1997 38	Portsmouth	1–0	Reading	Portsmouth
	Hall 84'; Perrett (yellow card)	Report	Bernal (yellow card); Hopkins (yellow card); Gooding (yellow card)	Stadium: Fratton Park; Attendance: 9,248

29 March 1997 39	Sheffield United	2–0	Reading	Sheffield
	Bodin 11' (o.g.); Walker 49'; Ebbrell (yellow card)	Report	Parkinson (yellow card); Morley (yellow card)	Stadium: Bramall Lane; Attendance: 15,153

31 March 1997 40	Reading	1–2	Barnsley	Reading
	Morley 27' (pen.); Bernal (yellow card); McPherson (yellow card); Blatherwick (yellow card); Parkinson (yellow card); Williams (yellow card)	Report	Holsgrove 2' (o.g.); Liddell 16' de Zeeuw (yellow card); Sheridan (yellow card); Redfearn (yellow card)	Stadium: Elm Park; Attendance: 10,244

5 April 1997 41	Stoke City	1–1	Reading	Stoke-on-Trent
	Forsyth 65'; Wallace (yellow card)	Report	Lambert 1'	Stadium: Victoria Ground; Attendance: 9,961

12 April 1997 42	Reading	2–1	Wolverhampton Wanderers	Reading
	Lovell 89', 90'; Hopkins (yellow card); Parkinson (yellow card)	Report	Atkins 75'; Law (yellow card); Roberts (yellow card)	Stadium: Elm Park; Attendance: 14,853

19 April 1997 43	Grimsby Town	2–0	Reading	Cleethorpes
	Southall 15'; Widdrington 71'	Report		Stadium: Blundell Park; Attendance: 4,392

23 April 1997 44	Crystal Palace	3–2	Reading	Selhurst
	Linighan 13'; Hopkin 49'; Shipperley 69'; Muscat (yellow card)	Report	Bodin 57'; Williams 82'; Hopkins (yellow card); Caskey (yellow card)	Stadium: Selhurst Park; Attendance: 12,552

26 April 1997 45	Reading	2–0	Oldham Athletic	Reading
	Roach 28' (yellow card); Lovell 81'; Bernal (yellow card); Williams (yellow card)	Report	Reid (yellow card); McCarthy (yellow card)	Stadium: Elm Park; Attendance: 8,301

3 May 1997 46	Manchester City	3–2	Reading	Manchester
	Dickov 34'; Rosler 66' (yellow card); Heaney 78'	Report	Meaker 2' (yellow card); Symons 33' (o.g.); Blatherwick (yellow card)	Stadium: Maine Road; Attendance: 27,260

==== League table ====
Pos	Team	Pld	W	D	L	GF	GA	GD	Pts
16	West Bromwich Albion	46	14	15	17	68	72	−4	57
17	Oxford United	46	16	9	21	64	68	−4	57
18	Reading	46	15	12	19	58	67	−9	57
19	Swindon Town	46	15	9	22	52	71	−19	54
20	Huddersfield Town	46	13	15	18	48	61	−13	54

Rules for classification: 1) Points; 2) Goals scored; 3) Goal difference

=== FA Cup ===
4 January 1997 Third round	Reading	3–1	Southampton	Reading
15:00 GMT (UTC)	Lambert 19'; Caskey 55'; Morley 76' (pen.); Holsgrove (yellow card)	Report	Ostenstad 49'; Benali (yellow card) 75' (yellow-red card); Slater (yellow card) 90' (yellow-red card); Le Tissier (yellow card) van Gobbel (yellow card)	Stadium: Elm Park; Attendance: 11,537

25 January 1997 Fourth round	Portsmouth	3–0	Reading	Portsmouth
15:00 GMT (UTC)	Hall 68'; Bradbury 76'; Hillier 86'; Pethick (yellow card); Perrett (yellow card); Svensson (yellow card)	Report	Lambert (yellow card)	Stadium: Fratton Park; Attendance: 15,003

=== League Cup ===
20 August 1996 First round 1st leg	Reading	1–1	Wycombe Wanderers	Reading
BST (UTC+1)	Quinn 57'	Report	Williams 64'; Brown (yellow card)	Stadium: Elm Park; Attendance: 6,210

3 September 1996 First round 2nd leg	Wycombe Wanderers	2–0 (3–1 agg.)	Reading	High Wycombe
BST (UTC+1)	Evans 57'; Williams 75' de Souza (yellow card)	Report		Stadium: Adams Park; Attendance: 5,069

== Squad statistics ==
As of match played 3 May 1997

=== Appearances and goals ===
No.	Pos	Nat	Player	Total		First Division		FA Cup		League Cup	
No.	Pos	Nat	Player	Apps	Goals	Apps	Goals	Apps	Goals	Apps	Goals
	GK	(Australia) AUS	Steve Mautone	15	0	15	0	0	0	0	0
	GK	(England) ENG	Sal Bibbo	6	0	5	0	1	0	0	0
	GK	(England) ENG	Nick Hammond	1	0	1	0	0	0	0	0
	DF	(Australia) AUS	Andy Bernal	44	0	41	0	2	0	1	0
	DF	(England) ENG	Steve Blatherwick	7	0	6+1	0	0	0	0	0
	DF	(England) ENG	Martyn Booty	18	0	14	0	2	0	2	0
	DF	(England) ENG	Keith McPherson	40	2	39	2	1	0	0	0
	DF	(England) ENG	Steve Swales	3	0	3	0	0	0	0	0
	DF	(Northern Ireland) NIR	Barry Hunter	29	2	26+1	2	1	0	1	0
	DF	(Poland) POL	Dariusz Wdowczyk	10	0	8	0	0	0	2	0
	DF	(Wales) WAL	Paul Bodin	39	1	37	1	0	0	2	0
	DF	(Wales) WAL	Jeff Hopkins	19	0	17+1	0	0	0	1	0
	MF	(England) ENG	David Bass	2	0	0+2	0	0	0	0	0
	MF	(England) ENG	Darren Caskey	38	1	26+9	0	2	1	1	0
	MF	(England) ENG	Byron Glasgow	5	0	2+2	0	0+1	0	0	0
	MF	(England) ENG	Mick Gooding	47	0	40+3	0	2	0	2	0
	MF	(England) ENG	Paul Holsgrove	17	2	12+2	2	2	0	1	0
	MF	(England) ENG	Jamie Lambert	33	6	20+11	5	2	1	0	0
	MF	(England) ENG	Phil Parkinson	26	1	15+9	1	0	0	1+1	0
	MF	(England) ENG	Ben Smith	1	0	0+1	0	0	0	0	0
	MF	(Wales) WAL	Michael Meaker	25	1	15+10	1	0	0	0	0
	FW	(Australia) AUS	Stuart Lovell	28	5	17+9	5	0+1	0	1	0
	FW	(England) ENG	Trevor Morley	40	23	36+1	22	2	1	1	0
	FW	(England) ENG	Neville Roach	3	1	2+1	1	0	0	0	0
	FW	(England) ENG	Martin Williams	33	3	21+8	3	2	0	2	0
	FW	(Northern Ireland) NIR	Jimmy Quinn	26	4	10+14	3	0	0	1+1	1
	FW	(Wales) WAL	Lee Nogan	34	6	21+11	6	0	0	1+1	0
Players away on loan:
Players who appeared for Reading but left during the season:
	GK	(Bulgaria) BUL	Borislav Mihaylov	11	0	8	0	1	0	2	0
	GK	(Northern Ireland) NIR	Tommy Wright	17	0	17	0	0	0	0	0
	DF	(England) ENG	Kenny Brown	5	0	5	0	0	0	0	0
	MF	(England) ENG	Michael Gilkes	35	1	27+5	1	2	0	0+1	0

=== Goal Scorers ===
Place	Position	Nation	Name	First Division	FA Cup	League Cup	Total
1	FW	(England)	Trevor Morley	22	1	0	23
2	FW	(Wales)	Lee Nogan	6	0	0	6
2	MF	(England)	Jamie Lambert	5	1	0	6
4	FW	(Australia)	Stuart Lovell	5	0	0	5
5	FW	(Northern Ireland)	Jimmy Quinn	3	0	1	4
6	FW	(England)	Martin Williams	3	0	0	3
6			Own goal	3	0	0	3
8	MF	(England)	Paul Holsgrove	2	0	0	2
8	DF	(Northern Ireland)	Barry Hunter	2	0	0	2
8	DF	(England)	Keith McPherson	2	0	0	2
11	DF	(Wales)	Paul Bodin	1	0	0	1
11	MF	(England)	Michael Gilkes	1	0	0	1
11	MF	(Wales)	Michael Meaker	1	0	0	1
11	FW	(England)	Neville Roach	1	0	0	1
11	MF	(England)	Darren Caskey	0	1	0	1
			TOTALS	58	3	1	62

=== Clean sheets ===
Place	Position	Nation	Name	First Division	FA Cup	League Cup	Total
1	GK	(Northern Ireland)	Tommy Wright	7	0	0	7
2	GK	(Australia)	Steve Mautone	4	0	0	4
3	GK	(Bulgaria)	Borislav Mihaylov	1	0	0	1
3	GK	(England)	Sal Bibbo	1	0	0	1
TOTALS				13	0	0	13

=== Disciplinary record ===
Position	Nation	Name	First Division		FA Cup		League Cup		Total	
Position	Nation	Name	Booked	Sent off (straight red)	Booked	Sent off (straight red)	Booked	Sent off (straight red)	Booked	Sent off (straight red)
DF	(Australia)	Andy Bernal	9	3	0	0	0	0	9	3
DF	(England)	Steve Blatherwick	2	0	0	0	0	0	2	0
DF	(England)	Keith McPherson	4	0	0	0	0	0	4	0
DF	(England)	Steve Swales	1	0	0	0	0	0	1	0
DF	(Northern Ireland)	Barry Hunter	11	2	0	0	0	0	11	2
DF	(Wales)	Paul Bodin	2	0	0	0	0	0	2	0
DF	(Wales)	Jeff Hopkins	5	0	0	0	0	0	5	0
MF	(England)	Darren Caskey	1	0	0	0	0	0	1	0
MF	(England)	Mick Gooding	8	1	0	0	0	0	8	1
MF	(England)	Paul Holsgrove	0	0	1	0	0	0	1	0
MF	(England)	Jamie Lambert	3	0	1	0	0	0	4	0
MF	(England)	Phil Parkinson	7	0	0	0	0	0	7	0
MF	(Wales)	Michael Meaker	5	0	0	0	0	0	5	0
FW	(England)	Trevor Morley	4	0	0	0	0	0	4	0
FW	(England)	Neville Roach	1	0	0	0	0	0	1	0
FW	(England)	Martin Williams	3	0	0	0	0	0	3	0
FW	(Northern Ireland)	Jimmy Quinn	2	0	0	0	0	0	2	0
FW	(Wales)	Lee Nogan	1	0	0	0	0	0	1	0
Players away on loan:
Players who left Reading during the season:
GK	(Bulgaria)	Borislav Mihaylov	0	1	0	0	0	0	0	1
GK	(Northern Ireland)	Tommy Wright	1	0	0	0	0	0	1	0
DF	(England)	Kenny Brown	2	0	0	0	0	0	2	0
MF	(England)	Michael Gilkes	1	0	0	0	0	0	1	0
Total			0	0	2	0	0	0	0	0
