= 1995–96 Reading F.C. season =

Reading
1995–96 season
- Chairman: John Madejski
- Manager: Mick Gooding and Jimmy Quinn (player-managers)
- Stadium: Elm Park
- First Division: 19th
- FA Cup: Fourth round vs Manchester United
- League Cup: Fifth round vs Leeds United
- Top goalscorer: League: Lee Nogan/Jimmy Quinn (10); All: Jimmy Quinn (16)
Home colours

During the 1995–96 English football season, Reading F.C. competed in the Football League First Division, following missing out on promotion to the Premier League the previous season.

== Squad ==
As of match played 5 May 1996

Name	Nationality	Position	Date of birth (Age (Note: Age as of the end of the season))	Signed from	Signed in	Contract ends	Apps.	Goals
Goalkeepers
Borislav Mihaylov	(Bulgaria)	GK	12 February 1963 (aged 33)	Botev Plovdiv	1995		17	0
Nick Hammond	(England)	GK	7 September 1967 (aged 28)	Plymouth Argyle	1996		6	0
Simon Sheppard	(England)	GK	7 August 1973 (aged 22)	Watford	1994		22	0
Steve Sutton	(England)	GK	16 April 1961 (aged 35)	loan from Derby County	1996	1996	2	0
Defenders
Andy Bernal	(Australia)	DF	21 February 1973 (aged 23)	Sydney Olympic	1994		85	2
Martyn Booty	(England)	DF	30 May 1971 (aged 24)	Crewe Alexandra	1996		17	1
Keith McPherson	(England)	DF	11 September 1963 (aged 32)	Northampton Town	1990			
Steve Swales	(England)	DF	26 December 1973 (aged 22)	Scarborough	1995		11	0
Michael Thorp	(England)	DF	5 December 1975 (aged 20)	Trainee	1995		5	0
Dylan Kerr	(Malta)	DF	14 January 1967 (aged 29)	Leeds United	1993		104	5
Dariusz Wdowczyk	(Poland)	DF	25 September 1962 (aged 33)	Celtic	1994		86	0
Jeff Hopkins	(Wales)	DF	14 April 1964 (aged 32)	Bristol Rovers	1992		136	3
Ady Williams	(Wales) (Note: Ady Williams was born in Reading, England, but also qualified to represent Wales internationally through his father, and would make his international debut for Wales on 23 May 1994.)	DF	16 September 1971 (aged 24)	Trainee	1989			
Midfielders
David Bass	(England)	MF	29 November 1974 (aged 21)	Trainee	1992		9	0
Darren Caskey	(England)	MF	21 August 1974 (aged 21)	Tottenham Hotspur	1996		15	2
Andy Freeman	(England)	MF	8 September 1977 (aged 18)	Trainee	1995		1	0
Michael Gilkes	(England) (Note: Michael Gilkes was born in Hackney, England, but also qualified to represent Barbados internationally and would make his international debut for Barbados in 2000.)	MF	20 July 1965 (aged 30)	Leicester City	1984			
Mick Gooding (Player-Manager)	(England)	MF	12 April 1959 (aged 37)	Wolverhampton Wanderers	1989			
Paul Holsgrove	(England)	MF	26 August 1969 (aged 26)	Millwall	1994		66	5
Tommy Jones	(England)	MF	7 October 1964 (aged 31)	Swindon Town	1992		92	2
Jamie Lambert	(England)	MF	14 September 1973 (aged 22)	Trainee	1992		75	10
Mick Murphy	(England)	MF	5 May 1977 (aged 18)	Trainee	1994		1	0
Phil Parkinson	(England)	MF	1 December 1967 (aged 28)	Bury	1992		182	9
Derek Simpson	(Scotland)	MF	23 December 1978 (aged 17)	Trainee	1994		0	0
Michael Meaker	(Wales) (Note: Michael Meaker was born in Greenford, England, but also qualified to represent Wales internationally, representing Wales U21 and Wales B.)	MF	18 August 1971 (aged 24)	Queens Park Rangers	1995		22	0
Forwards
Stuart Lovell	(Australia)	FW	9 January 1972 (aged 24)	Trainee	1990			
Alan Carey	(England)	FW	21 August 1975 (aged 20)	Trainee	1994		3	0
Trevor Morley	(England)	FW	20 March 1961 (aged 35)	West Ham United	1995		21	6
Jimmy Quinn (Player-Manager)	(Northern Ireland)	FW	7 December 1959 (aged 36)	Bournemouth	1992		190	90
Lee Nogan	(Wales)	FW	21 May 1969 (aged 26)	Watford	1995		68	23
Out on loan
Neville Gordon	(England)	MF	15 November 1975 (aged 20)	Millwall	1995		1	0
Martin Williams	(England)	FW	12 July 1973 (aged 22)	Luton Town	1995		16	1
Unknown
Jimmy Garrity	(England)		1 January 1976 (aged 20)	Newcastle United	1996		0	0
Left during the season
Eric Nixon	(England)	GK	4 October 1962 (aged 33)	loan from Tranmere Rovers	1996	1996	1	0
Chris Woods	(England)	GK	14 November 1959 (aged 36)	loan from Sheffield Wednesday	1995	1995	5	0
Kenny Brown	(England)	DF	11 July 1967 (aged 28)	loan from West Ham United	1995	1995	15	1
Robert Codner	(England)	FW	23 January 1965 (aged 31)	Brighton & Hove Albion	1995		5	0

=== Out on loan ===
Note: Flags indicate national team as defined under FIFA eligibility rules; some limited exceptions apply. Players may hold more than one non-FIFA nationality.

No. / Pos. / Nation / Player; — / MF / ENG / Neville Gordon (at Woking)	No. / Pos. / Nation / Player; — / FW / ENG / Martin Williams (at Bangor)

=== Left club during season ===
Note: Flags indicate national team as defined under FIFA eligibility rules; some limited exceptions apply. Players may hold more than one non-FIFA nationality.

No.	Pos.	Nation	Player
—	GK	ENG	Eric Nixon (loan return to Tranmere Rovers)
—	GK	ENG	Chris Woods (loan return to Sheffield Wednesday)

No.	Pos.	Nation	Player
—	DF	ENG	Kenny Brown (loan return to West Ham United)
—	FW	ENG	Robert Codner (to Peterborough United)

== Transfers ==
=== In ===
Date	Position	Nationality	Name	From	Fee	Ref.
Summer 1995	GK	(Bulgaria)	Borislav Mihaylov	Botev Plovdiv		
Summer 1995	DF	(England)	Steve Swales	Scarborough		
11 August 1995	MF	(England)	Neville Gordon	Millwall	Free	
Summer 1995	MF	(Wales)	Michael Meaker	Queens Park Rangers		
Summer 1995	FW	(England)	Robert Codner	Brighton & Hove Albion		
Summer 1995	FW	(England)	Trevor Morley	West Ham United		
Summer 1995	FW	(England)	Martin Williams	Luton Town	Free	
Winter 1996	DF	(England)	Martyn Booty	Crewe Alexandra		
January 1996		(England)	Jimmy Garrity	Newcastle United		
13 February 1996	GK	(England)	Nick Hammond	Plymouth Argyle	£40,000	
28 February 1996	MF	(England)	Darren Caskey	Tottenham Hotspur	£700,000	

=== Loans in ===
Date from	Position	Nationality	Name	From	Date to	Ref.
Summer 1995	DF	(England)	Kenny Brown	West Ham United	Winter 1996	
1 October 1995	GK	(England)	Chris Woods	Sheffield Wednesday	31 December 1995	
9 January 1996	GK	(England)	Eric Nixon	Tranmere Rovers	4 February 1996	
19 January 1996	GK	(England)	Steve Sutton	Derby County	31 May 1996	

=== Out ===
Date	Position	Nationality	Name	To	Fee	Ref.
Summer 1995	GK	(England)	Shaka Hislop	Newcastle United	£1,580,000	
Summer 1995	MF	(England)	Simon Osborn	Queens Park Rangers	£1,100,000	
Summer 1995	MF	(England)	Scott Taylor	Leicester City		
Summer 1995	FW	(England)	Lea Barkus	Fulham	£20,000	

=== Loans out ===
Date from	Position	Nationality	Name	To	Date to	Ref.
22 December 1995	FW	(England)	Martin Williams	Bangor	End of Season	
1 February 1996	MF	(England)	Neville Gordon	Woking	End of Season	

=== Released ===
Date	Position	Nationality	Name	Joined	Date	Ref.
31 December 1995	MF	(England)	Robert Codner	Peterborough United		
30 June 1996	GK	(England)	Simon Sheppard	Boreham Wood		
30 June 1996	MF	(England)	Tommy Jones	Woking		
30 June 1996	MF	(England)	Mick Murphy	Slough Town		
30 June 1996	MF	(England)	Neville Gordon			

== Competitions ==
=== First Division ===
==== Results ====
12 August 1995 1	Stoke City	1–1	Reading	Stoke-on-Trent
	Wallace	Report	Williams	Stadium: Victoria Ground

19 August 1995 2	Reading	3–2	Derby County	Reading
	Morley; Lovell; Nogan	Report	Preece; Sturridge	Stadium: Elm Park

26 August 1995 3	Portsmouth	0–0	Reading	Portsmouth
		Report		Stadium: Fratton Park

29 August 1995 4	Reading	1–2	Millwall	Reading
	Gooding	Report	Rae; Dixon	Stadium: Elm Park

1 September 1995 5	Southend United	0–0	Reading	Southend-on-Sea
		Report		Stadium: Roots Hall

9 September 1995 6	Reading	3–1	Luton Town	Reading
	Nogan; Lovell (pen.)	Report	Marshall	Stadium: Elm Park

12 September 1995 7	Reading	0–2	Grimsby Town	Reading
		Report	Woods	Stadium: Elm Park

16 September 1995 8	Leicester City	1–1	Reading	Leicester
	Roberts	Report	Bernal	Stadium: Filbert Street

23 September 1995 9	Reading	2–2	Port Vale	Reading
	Lambert	Report	Glover; Mills	Stadium: Elm Park; Attendance: 7,819

30 September 1995 10	Sunderland	2–2	Reading	Sunderland
	Kelly; Melville	Report	Kerr; Lovell	Stadium: Roker Park

7 October 1995 11	West Bromwich Albion	2–0	Reading	West Bromwich
	Gilbert; Taylor	Report		Stadium: The Hawthorns

14 October 1995 12	Reading	3–1	Huddersfield Town	Reading
	Lambert 15', 79'; Williams 70'	Report	Booth	Stadium: Elm Park

21 October 1995 13	Oldham Athletic	2–1	Reading	Oldham
	Richardson (pen.); Creaney	Report	Lovell	Stadium: Boundary Park

28 October 1995 14	Reading	1–4	Ipswich Town	Reading
	Lovell	Report	Uhlenbeek; Mathie; Williams; Mason	Stadium: Elm Park

4 November 1995 15	Crystal Palace	0–2	Reading	Selhurst
		Report	Shaw (o.g.); Nogan	Stadium: Selhurst Park

11 November 1995 16	Reading	0–1	Birmingham City	Reading
		Report	Charlery	Stadium: Elm Park

18 November 1995 17	Reading	0–0	Barnsley	Reading
		Report		Stadium: Elm Park

21 November 1995 18	Charlton Athletic	2–1	Reading	Charlton
	Chapple; Robinson	Report	Brown	Stadium: The Valley

25 November 1995 19	Sheffield United	0–0	Reading	Sheffield
		Report		Stadium: Bramall Lane

2 December 1995 20	Reading	3–1	West Bromwich Albion	Reading
	Morley; Holsgrove; Nogan	Report	Ashcroft	Stadium: Elm Park

9 December 1995 21	Port Vale	3–2	Reading	Stoke-on-Trent
	Guppy; Foyle; Porter (pen.)	Report	Quinn (pen.); Morley	Stadium: Vale Park

16 December 1995 22	Reading	1–1	Sunderland	Reading
	Quinn	Report	Smith	Stadium: Elm Park

30 December 1995 23	Norwich City	3–3	Reading	Norwich
	Ward; Johnson; Fleck	Report	Kerr; Lambert; Nogan	Stadium: Carrow Road

1 January 1996 24	Reading	1–0	Tranmere Rovers	Reading
	Morley	Report		Stadium: Elm Park

13 January 1996 25	Derby County	3–0	Reading	Derby
	Sturridge; Flynn	Report		Stadium: Pride Park

20 January 1996 26	Reading	1–0	Stoke City	Reading
	Gooding	Report		Stadium: Elm Park

4 February 1996 27	Reading	0–1	Portsmouth	Reading
		Report	McLoughlin	Stadium: Elm Park

10 February 1996 28	Millwall	1–1	Reading	Bermondsey
	Newman	Report	Bowry (o.g.)	Stadium: The Den

17 February 1996 29	Grimsby Town	0–0	Reading	Cleethorpes
		Report		Stadium: Blundell Park

24 February 1996 30	Reading	1–1	Leicester City	Reading
	Lovell (pen.)	Report	Lewis	Stadium: Elm Park

27 February 1996 31	Luton Town	1–2	Reading	Luton
	Guentchev (pen.)	Report	Booty; Lovell	Stadium: Kenilworth Road

2 March 1996 32	Reading	0–0	Watford	Reading
		Report		Stadium: Elm Park

9 March 1996 33	Wolverhampton Wanderers	1–1	Reading	Wolverhampton
	Atkins	Report	Gooding	Stadium: Molineux

16 March 1996 34	Reading	0–3	Norwich City	Reading
		Report	Prior; Eadie; O'Neill	Stadium: Elm Park

19 March 1996 35	Reading	3–3	Southend United	Reading
	Nogan	Report	Rammell; Willis	Stadium: Elm Park

23 March 1996 36	Tranmere Rovers	2–1	Reading	Birkenhead
	Aldridge; Hopkins (?)	Report	Caskey	Stadium: Prenton Park

30 March 1996 37	Reading	2–0	Oldham Athletic	Reading
	Quinn	Report		Stadium: Elm Park

2 April 1996 38	Huddersfield Town	3–1	Reading	Huddersfield
	Edwards; Booth	Report	A. Williams	Stadium: Alfred McAlpine Stadium

6 April 1996 39	Ipswich Town	1–2	Reading	Ipswich
	Mathie	Report	Bernal; Quinn	Stadium: Portman Road

8 April 1996 40	Reading	0–2	Crystal Palace	Reading
		Report	Freedman; Houghton	Stadium: Elm Park

13 April 1996 41	Barnsley	0–1	Reading	Barnsley
		Report	Quinn (?)	Stadium: Oakwell

16 April 1996 42	Watford	4–2	Reading	Watford
	White; Connolly; Ramage	Report	Quinn; Caskey	Stadium: Vicarage Road

20 April 1996 43	Reading	0–0	Charlton Athletic	Reading
		Report		Stadium: Elm Park

27 April 1996 44	Reading	0–3	Sheffield United	Reading
		Report	Walker; Whitehouse	Stadium: Elm Park

30 April 1996 45	Reading	3–0	Wolverhampton Wanderers	Reading
	M. Williams; Quinn	Report		Stadium: Elm Park

5 May 1996 46	Birmingham City	1–2	Reading	Birmingham
	Barnes	Report	Nogan; Quinn	Stadium: St Andrew's

==== League table ====
Pos	Team	Pld	W	D	L	GF	GA	GD	Pts
17	Grimsby Town	46	14	14	18	55	69	−14	56
18	Oldham Athletic	46	14	14	18	54	50	+4	56
19	Reading	46	13	17	16	54	63	−9	56
20	Wolverhampton Wanderers	46	13	16	17	56	62	−6	55
21	Portsmouth	46	13	13	20	61	69	−8	52

Rules for classification: 1) Points; 2) Goals scored; 3) Goal difference

=== FA Cup ===
6 January 1996 Third Round	Reading	3–1	Gillingham	Reading
15:00 GMT (UTC)	Morley; Quinn	Report	Martin	Stadium: Elm Park

27 January 1996 Fourth Round	Reading	0–3	Manchester United	Reading
15:00 GMT (UTC)		Report	Giggs 36'; Parker 56'; Cantona 89'	Stadium: Elm Park; Attendance: 14,780

=== League Cup ===
20 September 1995 Second round 1st leg	Reading	1–1	West Bromwich Albion	Reading
19:45 BST (UTC+1)	Lovell	Report	Burgess	Stadium: Elm Park

3 October 1995 Second round 2nd leg	West Bromwich Albion	2–4 (3–5 agg.)	Reading	West Bromwich
19:45 BST (UTC+1)	Donovan; Burgess	Report	Lovell; Lambert; Quinn (pen.)	Stadium: The Hawthorns

8 November 1995 Third Round	Reading	2–1	Bury	Reading
19:45 GMT (UTC)	Quinn; Lucketti (o.g.)	Report	Rigby	Stadium: Elm Park

28 November 1995 Fourth Round	Reading	2–1	Southampton	Reading
19:45 GMT (UTC)	Nogan; Morley	Report	Monkou	Stadium: Elm Park

10 January 1996 Fifth Round	Leeds United	2–1	Reading	Leeds
20:00 GMT (UTC)	Masinga; Speed	Report	Quinn	Stadium: Elland Road

== Squad statistics ==
As of match played 5 May 1996

=== Appearances and goals ===
No.	Pos	Nat	Player	Total		First Division		FA Cup		League Cup	
No.	Pos	Nat	Player	Apps	Goals	Apps	Goals	Apps	Goals	Apps	Goals
	GK	(Bulgaria) BUL	Borislav Mihaylov	17	0	16	0	1	0	0	0
	GK	(England) ENG	Nick Hammond	6	0	5	0	1	0	0	0
	GK	(England) ENG	Simon Sheppard	22	0	18	0	0	0	4	0
	GK	(England) ENG	Steve Sutton	2	0	2	0	0	0	0	0
	DF	(Australia) AUS	Andy Bernal	45	2	34+6	2	1	0	4	0
	DF	(England) ENG	Martyn Booty	17	1	17	1	0	0	0	0
	DF	(England) ENG	Keith McPherson	19	0	16	0	0	0	3	0
	DF	(England) ENG	Steve Swales	11	0	4+5	0	1	0	0+1	0
	DF	(England) ENG	Michael Thorp	5	0	2	0	1	0	2	0
	DF	(Malta) MLT	Dylan Kerr	9	2	4+4	2	0	0	0+1	0
	DF	(Poland) POL	Dariusz Wdowczyk	42	0	39+1	0	0	0	2	0
	DF	(Wales) WAL	Jeff Hopkins	14	0	14	0	0	0	0	0
	DF	(Wales) WAL	Ady Williams	35	3	31	3	2	0	2	0
	MF	(England) ENG	Darren Caskey	15	2	15	2	0	0	0	0
	MF	(England) ENG	Andy Freeman	1	0	0+1	0	0	0	0	0
	MF	(England) ENG	Michael Gilkes	50	0	36+8	0	1	0	3+2	0
	MF	(England) ENG	Mick Gooding	46	3	37+3	3	2	0	4	0
	MF	(England) ENG	Paul Holsgrove	37	1	27+3	1	2	0	5	0
	MF	(England) ENG	Tommy Jones	26	0	13+8	0	2	0	3	0
	MF	(England) ENG	Jamie Lambert	21	6	10+5	5	0+2	0	2+2	1
	MF	(England) ENG	Phil Parkinson	49	0	36+6	0	2	0	5	0
	MF	(Wales) WAL	Michael Meaker	22	0	15+6	0	0+1	0	0	0
	FW	(Australia) AUS	Stuart Lovell	40	9	28+7	7	0+2	0	3	2
	FW	(England) ENG	Trevor Morley	21	6	14+3	4	2	1	2	1
	FW	(Northern Ireland) NIR	Jimmy Quinn	42	16	20+15	10	2	2	2+3	4
	FW	(Wales) WAL	Lee Nogan	45	11	32+7	10	2	0	4	1
Players away on loan:
	MF	(England) ENG	Neville Gordon	1	0	0+1	0	0	0	0	0
	FW	(England) ENG	Martin Williams	16	1	11+4	1	0	0	0+1	0
Players who appeared for Reading but left during the season:
	GK	(England) ENG	Eric Nixon	1	0	0	0	0	0	1	0
	GK	(England) ENG	Chris Woods	5	0	5	0	0	0	0	0
	DF	(England) ENG	Kenny Brown	15	1	12	1	0	0	3	0
	FW	(England) ENG	Robert Codner	5	0	3+1	0	0	0	1	0

=== Goal Scorers ===
Place	Position	Nation	Name	First Division	FA Cup	League Cup	Total
1	FW	(Northern Ireland)	Jimmy Quinn	10	2	4	16
2	FW	(Wales)	Lee Nogan	10	0	1	11
3	FW	(Australia)	Stuart Lovell	7	0	2	9
4	FW	(England)	Trevor Morley	4	1	1	6
5	MF	(England)	Jamie Lambert	5	0	1	6
6	DF	(Wales)	Ady Williams	3	0	0	3
6	MF	(England)	Mick Gooding	3	0	0	3
6			Own goal	2	0	1	3
9	DF	(Malta)	Dylan Kerr	2	0	0	2
9	DF	(Australia)	Andy Bernal	2	0	0	2
9	MF	(England)	Darren Caskey	2	0	0	2
12	DF	(England)	Kenny Brown	1	0	0	1
12	DF	(England)	Martyn Booty	1	0	0	1
12	MF	(England)	Paul Holsgrove	1	0	0	1
12	FW	(England)	Martin Williams	1	0	0	1
			TOTALS	54	3	10	67

== Team kit ==
Reading's kit for the 1995–96 was manufactured by Pelada, and the main sponsor was Auto Trader.

1995–96 home colours	1995–96 away colours
