= Our Lady and St Bede Catholic Academy =

Location
- Bishopton Road West; Stockton-on-Tees; County Durham, TS19 0QH; England
- Coordinates: 54.571°N 1.34618°W

Information
- Type: Academy
- Religious affiliation: Roman Catholic
- Local authority: Stockton-on-Tees
- Department for Education URN: 141370 Tables
- Ofsted: Reports
- Gender: Coeducational
- Age: 11 to 16
- Website: http://www.olsb.stockton.sch.uk/

Our Lady and St Bede Catholic Academy (formerly Our Lady and St Bede RC School) is a coeducational secondary school located in Stockton-on-Tees, County Durham, England.

Previously a voluntary aided school administered by Stockton-on-Tees Borough Council and the Roman Catholic Diocese of Hexham and Newcastle, Our Lady and St Bede RC School converted to academy status in February 2015 and was renamed Our Lady and St Bede Catholic Academy. The school is still administered by the Diocese of Hexham and Newcastle but is now independent of council control. Since the school became independent of Stockton Local Authority the progress of pupils has risen significantly. In 2016 Our Lady and St Bede was the highest performing school in the North East of England using the government's new Progress 8 measure.

Our Lady and St Bede Catholic Academy offers GCSEs and BTECs as programmes of study for pupils. Graduating students often go on to attend Stockton Riverside College or Stockton Sixth Form College.

== History ==
In March 2002, 14-year-old student Rebecca Cooper, the captain of the Our Lady and St Bede netball team, died during a match warm-up. During the warm-up she was jogging backwards when she accidentally tripped and banged her head, resulting in a fractured skull and swelling of the brain. A coroner's report recorded a verdict of accidental death.

Notable former students at the school include football player and manager Phil Parkinson.

== Subjects Taught ==
Subject	KS3	GCSE	BTEC
Art	Yes	Yes	No
Biology	Within Science	Yes	No
Chemistry	Within Science	Yes	No
Computer Science	Yes	Yes	Yes
Design Technology	Yes	Yes	No
English Language	Within English	Yes	No
English Literature	Within English	Yes	No
French	Yes	Yes	No
Geography	Yes	Yes	No
History	Yes	Yes	No
Mathematics	Compulsory	Compulsory	No
Music	Yes	Yes	No
Physical Education	Compulsory	Yes	Yes
Physics	Within Science	Yes	No
Religious Education	Compulsory	Compulsory	No
Spanish	Yes	Yes	No
