= Mick Murphy (footballer) =

English footballer

Personal information
- Full name: Michael John Murphy
- Date of birth: 5 May 1977 (age 49)
- Place of birth: Slough, England
- Positions: Midfielder; left back

Senior career*
| Years | Team | Apps | (Gls) |
| 1994–1996 | Reading | 2 | (0) |
| 1996– | Slough Town | 12 | (1) |
| 1996–1997 | TPV Tampere Palloseura | 20 | (3) |
| 1998–2001 | Riihimäen Palloseura | 87 | (14) |
| 2001–2002 | Hyvinkään Palloseura | 22 | (8) |
| 2002–2003 | Windsor & Eton | 28 | (5) |
| 2003–2005 | Slough Town | 82 | (5) |
| 2005–2006 | Staines Town | 32 | (4) |
| 2006–2007 | Walton & Hersham | 10 | (2) |
| 2007–2008 | Slough Town | ? | (?) |
| 2008–2009 | Ashford Town (Middlesex) | ? | (?) |
- * Club domestic league appearances and goals

Michael John Murphy (born 5 May 1977) is an English former professional footballer who played in the Football League and National Conference League as a Striker, before moving to play in Scandinavia in the Finnish Veikkausliiga and Ykkonen league as a left sided midfielder and wing-back. Finishing his career in semi-professional football in the United Kingdom
