= Paddy Kelly (footballer, born 1978) =

Scottish footballer

Personal information
- Full name: Patrick Kelly
- Date of birth: 26 April 1978 (age 48)
- Place of birth: Kirkcaldy, Scotland
- Position: Defender

Youth career
- Celtic Boys Club

Senior career*
Years	Team	Apps	(Gls)
1996–1997	Celtic	1	(0)
1997–1999	Newcastle United	0	(0)
1998	→ Reading (loan)	3	(0)
1999–2000	Livingston	32	(0)
2000–2001	Raith Rovers	7	(0)
2001–2002	Partick Thistle	10	(0)
2003–2004	East Fife	25	(0)
2004–2005	Cowdenbeath	2	(0)
Total		80	(0)
- * Club domestic league appearances and goals

Patrick Kelly (born 26 April 1978) is a Scottish former professional footballer who played as a defender.

== Career ==
Born in Kirkcaldy, Kelly played for Celtic Boys Club, Celtic, Newcastle United, Reading, Livingston, Raith Rovers, Partick Thistle, East Fife and Cowdenbeath.
