= Phil Chapple =

English footballer (born 1966)

Personal information
- Full name: Philip Richard Chapple
- Date of birth: 26 November 1966 (age 59)
- Place of birth: Norwich, England
- Height: 6 ft 2 in (1.88 m)
- Position: Defender

Youth career
- 1985–1988: Norwich City

Senior career*
Years	Team	Apps	(Gls)
1988–1993	Cambridge United	187	(19)
1993–1998	Charlton Athletic	142	(15)
1998–2001	Peterborough United	17	(1)
Total		346	(35)
- * Club domestic league appearances and goals

Philip Richard Chapple (born 26 November 1966) is an English former professional footballer.

Chapple began his career with Cambridge United after coming through the youth teams at Norwich City. He was part of the Us defence which gained consecutive promotions in 1989–90 and 1990–91. He joined Charlton Athletic in 1993 and spent five seasons at The Valley before ending his career at Peterborough United.

After retiring from playing Chapple took up coaching roles at Peterborough United and West Ham United before becoming chief scout back at Charlton. After a brief spell at Fulham Chapple was appointed European scout at Brighton & Hove Albion. In September 2019 Chapple joined Stoke City as head of first-team recruitment until February 2020.

In May 2025 he was appointed Head of Recruitment at Charlton Athletic.

== Playing career ==
A centre back who started his career with Norwich City, he failed to make the breakthrough and joined Cambridge United on a free transfer in March 1988. During his time at The Abbey Stadium, Chapple went on to feature in the club's most successful seasons, culminating in a rise from Division 4 to Division 2 in successive seasons. In total Chapple made 187 league appearances for the club, scoring an impressive 19 goals.

Charlton Athletic paid £100,000 for his services in 1993 and he went on to have a 5-year playing career at The Valley, scoring 15 goals in 141 games before joining Peterborough United in 1998. Chapple endured an injury ravaged time at London Road and only managed 17 games and one goal before retiring from playing.

== Scouting career ==
Chapple stayed at Peterborough in a number of roles including Youth Team Coach, Scout and Head Coach before leaving in September 2003.

He had spells as academy coach at West Ham United and as a coach at Newmarket Town and in 2007 returned to Charlton Athletic as chief scout. When Charlton named Phil Parkinson as caretaker manager in November 2008, Phil briefly joined the first-team coaching set-up before returning to his Chief Scout role in July 2009. He remained at Charlton until September 2015 when he joined Fulham. He was appointed European scout at Brighton & Hove Albion in December 2016.

In September 2019 he was appointed as head of first-team recruitment at Stoke City. He left Stoke in February 2020. He is currently a scout for Luton Town.

== Career statistics ==
Appearances and goals by club, season and competition
Club	Season	League			FA Cup		League Cup		Other		Total	
Club	Season	Division	Apps	Goals	Apps	Goals	Apps	Goals	Apps	Goals	Apps	Goals
Cambridge United	1987–88	Fourth Division	6	1	0	0	0	0	0	0	6	1
Cambridge United	1988–89	Fourth Division	46	3	3	1	2	0	3 (Note: Appearances in Football League Trophy)	0	54	4
Cambridge United	1989–90	Fourth Division	45	5	10	0	4	1	5 (Note: Two Appearances in Football League Trophy and three appearances in Football League Fourth Division play-offs)	0	64	6
Cambridge United	1990–91	Third Division	43	5	7	0	2	0	5	0	57	5
Cambridge United	1991–92	Second Division	29	3	3	0	1	0	2 (Note: Appearances in Football League Second Division play-offs)	0	35	3
Cambridge United	1992–93	First Division	18	2	0	0	2	0	2 (Note: Appearances in Anglo-Italian Cup)	0	22	2
Cambridge United	Total		187	19	23	1	11	1	17	0	238	21
Charlton Athletic	1993–94	First Division	44	5	3	0	2	0	5	0	54	5
Charlton Athletic	1994–95	First Division	21	2	1	0	2	0	0	0	23	2
Charlton Athletic	1995–96	First Division	16	2	0	0	3	0	0	0	19	2
Charlton Athletic	1996–97	First Division	26	2	2	0	3	0	0	0	31	2
Charlton Athletic	1997–98	First Division	35	4	3	0	1	0	0	0	39	4
Charlton Athletic	Total		142	15	9	0	11	0	5	0	167	15
Peterborough United	1998–99	Third Division	1	0	0	0	0	0	1	0	2	0
Peterborough United	1999–2000	Third Division	16	1	1	0	0	0	1	0	18	1
Peterborough United	Total		17	1	1	0	0	0	2	0	20	1
Career total			346	35	33	1	22	1	24	0	425	37

== Honours ==
Cambridge United

- Football League Third Division: 1990–91
- Football League Fourth Division play-offs: 1990
