= Neville Roach =

English footballer (born 1978)

Personal information
- Date of birth: 29 September 1978 (age 48)
- Place of birth: Reading, Berkshire, England
- Position: Forward

Team information
- Current team: Basingstoke Town (U21 Manager)

Youth career
- ????–1996: Reading

Senior career*
Years	Team	Apps	(Gls)
1996–1999	Reading	16	(1)
1998	→ Kingstonian (loan)	11	(4)
1998	→ Slough Town (loan)	11	(2)
1999–2000	Southend United	16	(2)
2000	Kingstonian	1	(0)
2000–2001	Eastern Pride	12	(5)
2001	St Albans City	4	(0)
2001	Oldham Athletic	1	(0)
2001	Torquay United	12	(1)
2001–2002	Slough Town	23	(14)
2002–2005	Basingstoke Town	125	(47)
2005–2006	Eastleigh	23	(7)
2005–2006	→ Oxford United (loan)	7	(0)
2006	→ Maidenhead United (loan)	9	(5)
2006–2007	Basingstoke Town	16	(2)
2007	Maidenhead United	25	(8)
2007	→ Harrow Borough (loan)	7	(1)
2007–2008	Farnborough	10	(7)
2008	Uxbridge	21	(7)
2008–2009	Didcot Town		

Managerial career
- 2010–2012: Hartley Wintney
- 2012: Thatcham Town
- 2016: Badshot Lea
- * Club domestic league appearances and goals

Neville Roach (born 29 September 1978) is an English former professional footballer who played as a forward.

== Playing career ==
Roach was born in Reading and began his career as an apprentice with Reading, turning professional in August 1996. His league debut came on 26 April 1997, when he scored the first goal in a 2–0 victory home over Oldham Athletic. Despite this impressive start, he found it difficult to establish himself and joined Kingstonian on loan in January 1998.

In August 1998, out of favour at the start of the new season, he joined Slough Town on loan, scoring twice in 11 Isthmian League games. His debut goal for Reading turned out to be his only goal for the club, as he failed to find the net in four other starts, or 11 substitute appearances.

In January 1999, Roach was told by Reading manager Tommy Burns that he was free to leave and began talks with Conference side Stevenage Borough. On 23 February 1999, he joined Wycombe Wanderers on loan, playing for their reserves the following day.

This was to be his only appearance for Wycombe as on 26 February he joined Southend United on loan, with the move being made permanent on 3 March, costing the Shrimpers £30,000. He made his Southend debut on 27 February in a 3–0 defeat away to Cambridge United and scored on his home debut on 6 March as Southend beat Swansea City 2–0. In February 2000, knowing that he would be released at the end of the season, Roach was allowed to join Chester City on trial, followed by a further one-week trial at Scarborough in March 2000. Nothing came of the trials, and at the end of the season he was released by Southend, having played only five games. In March 2000 he was called up by the Cayman Islands for their World Cup Qualifiers, but flew home from Cuba after FIFA blocked Roach and six other British-based players from playing.

He returned to Kingstonian on trial, playing in a friendly against Reading on 1 August 2000, but nine days later had signed for Australian side Eastern Pride. In February 2001, with the demise of Eastern Pride, he returned to the UK, joining St Albans City, making his debut in the Isthmian League Cup tie at home to Hampton & Richmond Borough. He played six further times, scoring twice (both against Chesham United in the Full Members Cup on 20 February before joining Frickley Athletic in March 2001.

On 22 March, within two weeks of joining Frickley, Roach left to join Oldham Athletic. He made only one appearance, as a second-half substitute for Carlo Corazzin, for Oldham, on the final day of the season, a 5–0 defeat away to Millwall, before being released.

In the 2001 close-season he joined Torquay United on trial, impressing manager Roy McFarland sufficiently to be signed on non-contract terms on 9 August which allowed him to make his debut two days later on the opening day of the season, playing as a late substitute for Eifion Williams in the 1–0 defeat away to Bristol Rovers. He remained on non-contract terms for the next two months, leaving the club by his own choice in November 2001 to join Stevenage Borough. The following month he joined Slough Town on a match to match basis, but left the same month to join Basingstoke Town. The 2002–03 season was a great success for Roach, he scored 25 goals, earned a trial with Football League side Boston United and won the Basingstoke supporters player of the year award.

In the summer of 2005, after scoring 62 times in 162 first team appearances, he left Basingstoke to join local rivals Eastleigh. In November 2005 he joined struggling League Two side Oxford United on loan, returning to Eastleigh in February 2006 after Oxford had signed two new strikers (Yemi Odubade and Tim Sills).

Roach was transfer-listed by Eastleigh in October 2005 and spent the end of the 2005–06 season on loan at Maidenhead United, but returned to Basingstoke in June 2006. In January 2007, Roach returned to Maidenhead on loan from Basingstoke, extending his loan two further times, before signing on a permanent basis in mid-April.

He suffered a viral illness during the 2007 close season, and was loaned to Harrow Borough and then Farnborough to regain fitness. He was released by Maidenhead in October 2007 and joined Farnbrough, where he scored regularly before moving on to Uxbridge in January 2008.

On 16 July 2008, Roach joined Didcot Town.

== Managerial career ==
In 2010, a knee ligament injury forced him to stop playing and so he moved into management, taking over Hartley Wintney in May 2010. He remained at the club until the summer of 2012, when he was appointed manager of Thatcham Town. However, he left Thatcham in October 2012.

In May 2013 he became a part of the coaching set-up at Hellenic League side Highmoor Ibis. At the end of the 2013–14 season he became assistant manager at Marlow, although he left the club in September 2014. In July 2016 he was appointed manager of Badshot Lea. However, he resigned from the position in November and joined Basingstoke Town as manager of their U21 team.
