= Robbie Pethick =

English footballer

Personal information
- Full name: Robert John Pethick
- Date of birth: 8 September 1970 (age 56)
- Place of birth: Tavistock, Devon, England
- Height: 1.78 m (5 ft 10 in)
- Position: Defender

Senior career*
Years	Team	Apps	(Gls)
1992–1993	Weymouth	46	(7)
1993–1999	Portsmouth	189	(3)
1999–2001	Bristol Rovers	63	(2)
2001–2004	Brighton & Hove Albion	64	(0)
2004–2006	Havant & Waterlooville		
2009	Horndean	5	(0)
- * Club domestic league appearances and goals

Robert John Pethick (born 8 September 1970) is an English retired football defender.

Pethick was born in Tavistock, and played for Weymouth, Portsmouth and Bristol Rovers before his 2001 move to Brighton. Whilst at Brighton, Pethick scored once in the FA Cup against Norwich City. He returned to Weymouth to play under Steve Claridge, whilst the BBC show Football Diaries was shown. He subsequently played for Havant & Waterlooville before announcing his retirement in 2006.

== Honours ==
Brighton & Hove Albion

- Football League Second Division: 2001–02
