= Sal Bibbo =

English footballer and coach

Personal information
- Full name: Salvatore Bibbo
- Date of birth: 24 August 1974 (age 52)
- Place of birth: Basingstoke, England
- Position: Goalkeeper

Team information
- Current team: Coventry City (goalkeeping coach)

Senior career*
Years	Team	Apps	(Gls)
1992	Basingstoke Town	1	(0)
1992–1993	Crawley Town	0	(0)
1993–1996	Sheffield United	0	(0)
1995	→ Chesterfield (loan)	1	(0)
1996	→ Ards (loan)	4	(0)
1996–1998	Reading	7	(0)
1999–2000	Havant & Waterlooville	29	(0)
2000–2001	Bath City	38	(0)
- * Club domestic league appearances and goals

Salvatore Bibbo (born 24 August 1974) is an English former footballer who played as a goalkeeper. He is the current goalkeeping coach at Coventry City.

== Playing career ==
Born in Basingstoke, Bibbo made one appearance for his hometown club in December 1992 against St. Albans City. He had a spell at Crawley Town but did not make an appearance before moving to Sheffield United in August 1993. He made just two appearances for the Blades over three years and was loaned out to Chesterfield and Northern Irish side Ards. Bibbo joined Reading in 1996 and made nine appearances for the side over two seasons before moving into non-league football due to a back injury. He joined Havant & Waterlooville in 1999 and made 36 appearances during his first and only season with the club. On 9 July 2000 he joined fellow Southern League Premier Division side Bath City on a one-year contract. He made 45 appearances in all competitions but left at the end of the season due to budget constraints and retired from playing in 2004.

== Coaching career ==
Following his retirement Bibbo rejoined former side Reading as a goalkeeping coach on an initial part-time basis before signing full-time in 2006. He signed a new 12-month rolling contract in June 2010 and has also coached at the Nike Academy.

In the summer of 2019, Bibbo became the goalkeeping coach of Arsenal's first team. After Mikel Arteta was appointed as club head-coach in December 2019, Bibbo stayed to work with new goalkeeping coach Iñaki Caña. He left the role in summer 2020.

On 21 November 2023, Bibbo was appointed as goalkeeping coach at Sheffield Wednesday.

On 3 July 2025, Bibbo joined Rangers as their goalkeeper coach.

On 29th June 2026, Bibbo left Scottish side Rangers for English Premier league new-boys Coventry City.
