= Phil Parkinson =

English footballer and manager (born 1967)

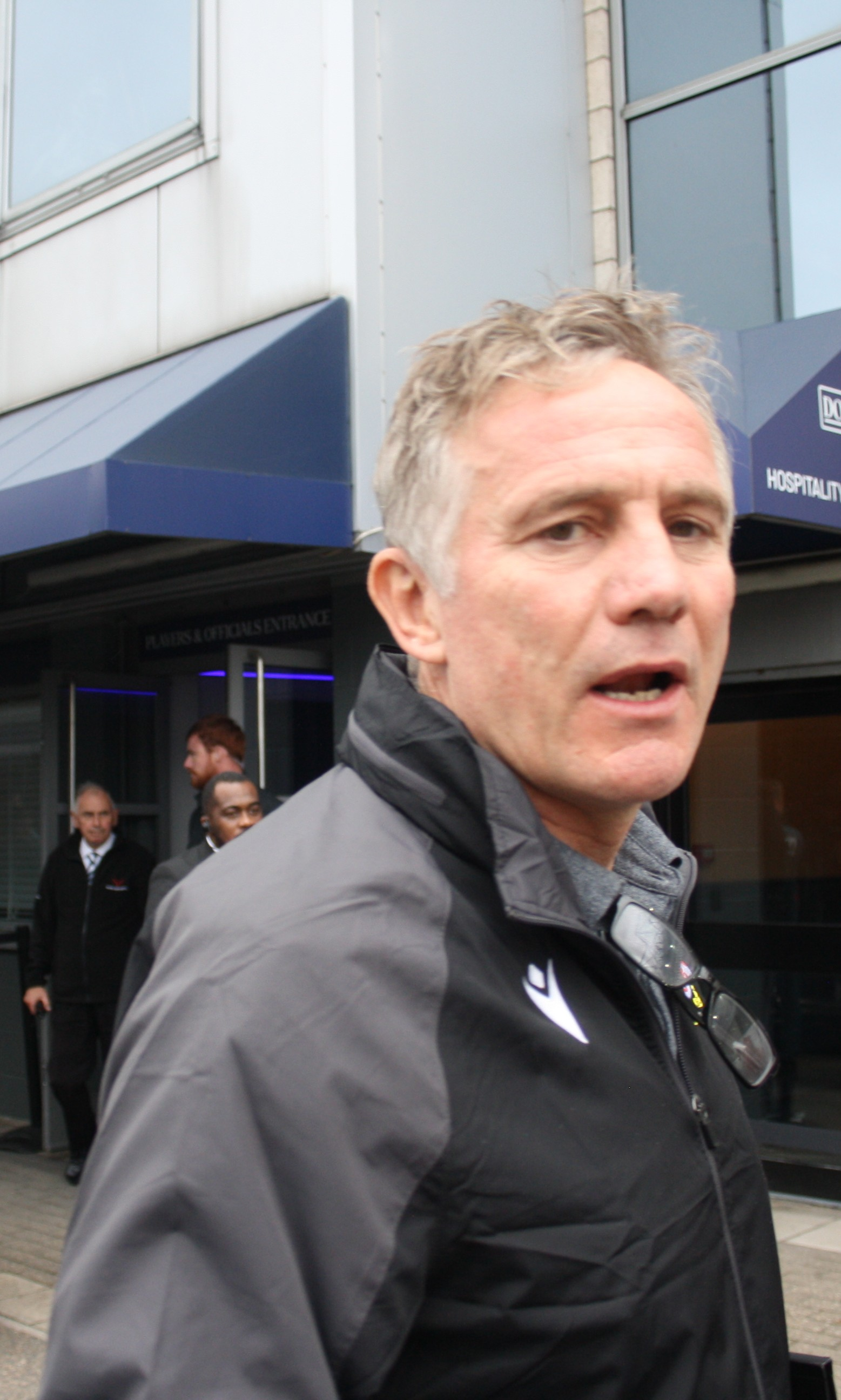
- Parkinson in 2025

Personal information
- Full name: Philip John Parkinson
- Date of birth: 1 December 1967 (age 58)
- Place of birth: Chorley, Lancashire, England
- Height: 5 ft 10 in (1.78 m)
- Position: Midfielder

Team information
- Current team: Wrexham (manager)

Youth career
- Southampton

Senior career*
Years	Team	Apps	(Gls)
1985–1988	Southampton	0	(0)
1988–1992	Bury	145	(5)
1992–2003	Reading	362	(20)
Total		507	(25)

Managerial career
- 2003–2006: Colchester United
- 2006: Hull City
- 2008–2011: Charlton Athletic
- 2011–2016: Bradford City
- 2016–2019: Bolton Wanderers
- 2019–2020: Sunderland
- 2021–: Wrexham
- * Club domestic league appearances and goals

Philip John Parkinson (born 1 December 1967) is an English professional football manager and former midfielder. He is the current manager of EFL Championship club Wrexham.

Parkinson acquired a Social Science degree early into his career as a manager and is the only manager to take an English fourth-tier side to the final of a major cup competition, leading Bradford City of League Two to the 2013 League Cup final. During his career, he has achieved promotion six times: with Colchester to the Championship in 2006, with Bradford City to League One in 2013, with Bolton Wanderers to the Championship in 2017, and with Wrexham to League Two in 2023, League One in 2024 and the Championship in 2025.

== Early life ==
Parkinson was born in Chorley, England, and grew up there until the age of ten, when he moved with his parents and two siblings to Stockton-on-Tees, where he attended Our Lady and St Bede RC School.

== Playing career ==
=== Early playing career ===
Parkinson, a former Southampton trainee, signed for Third Division side Bury for £12,000 in March 1988, making his Football League debut shortly after. He later joined Reading for £50,000 in July 1992.

=== Reading ===
Parkinson was named player of the season for two consecutive years (1997–98 and 1998–99) and was also a key member of the 1993–94 Football League Second Division championship-winning team. He captained the team to promotion from the Second Division in 2001–02 and soon after promotion success, Parkinson celebrated his testimonial year with a memorable night at Madejski Stadium, where 20,000 fans watched former Reading teammates such as Shaka Hislop, Michael Gilkes and Jeff Hopkins take on an England XI including the likes of Paul Gascoigne, John Barnes and Chris Waddle. Parkinson's final competitive appearance for Reading was a League Cup defeat against Cambridge United on 10 September 2002.

Although Parkinson rarely featured on the field in his final season as Reading returned to the First Division, he remained a well-respected member of the squad until his departure to Layer Road.

In a 2005 poll to compile the Royals' best-ever XI, Parkinson was voted the best central midfielder with 60.3% of the vote.

== Managerial career ==
=== Colchester United ===
Parkinson left Reading early in 2003 after 11 seasons to take his first steps in management with EFL League One club Colchester United. Despite showing promising signs as he steered the U's to safety upon arrival in February 2003, the 2003–04 season started poorly as Colchester slipped to three straight league defeats, only softened by a victory in the League Cup. Colchester's form improved and a strong FA Cup run, LDV run and a good finish to the season left optimism for U's supporters.

The 2005–06 season saw them finish in second place, thereby gaining an unlikely promotion to the Championship, despite having the lowest average attendance of the division. However, he resigned in June 2006 with a year left to run on his contract.

=== Hull City ===
Parkinson was confirmed as the new manager of Championship club Hull City in late June 2006, following the departure of Peter Taylor. Hull agreed to pay Colchester £400,000 compensation. When he led Hull against his old club, however, he was embarrassed as his former club romped home 5–1. After another defeat in the next match at home to Southampton 4–2, he left by "mutual consent" in early December, leaving Hull in the relegation zone.

=== Charlton Athletic ===
Parkinson then joined Championship club Charlton Athletic in January 2007 as assistant manager to Alan Pardew, having previously worked together at Reading. He was close to a return to management with Huddersfield Town in April 2007, but made a last-minute decision to remain with Charlton. Parkinson later extended his contract with Charlton until 2010. Following Pardew's departure in November 2008, he was appointed caretaker manager and given the job permanently on New Year's Eve 2008, despite failing to win any of his eight matches in caretaker charge. Under his management, Charlton were relegated to the third tier of English football for the first time in nearly 30 years.

In League One, Charlton started off very well, winning their first six league matches, but that run was brought to an end after a 1–1 draw at home to Southampton, Parkinson's ex-manager Alan Pardew's side. Charlton continued to do well and were in the top two until the new year where Norwich overtook them and they then never returned to the top two, finishing fourth in the league. In the play-offs, they had to play Swindon Town over the two legs and lost the first one 2–1 at the County Ground. In the second, however, they turned it around and led 2–0 but Swindon fought back and it finished 3–3 on aggregate. Swindon then continued and won on penalties 5–4 to condemn Parkinson and his men to another season in League One. Having not won a league game since November, Parkinson was dismissed on 4 January 2011, the day after his side's 4–2 loss at home to Swindon.

=== Bradford City ===
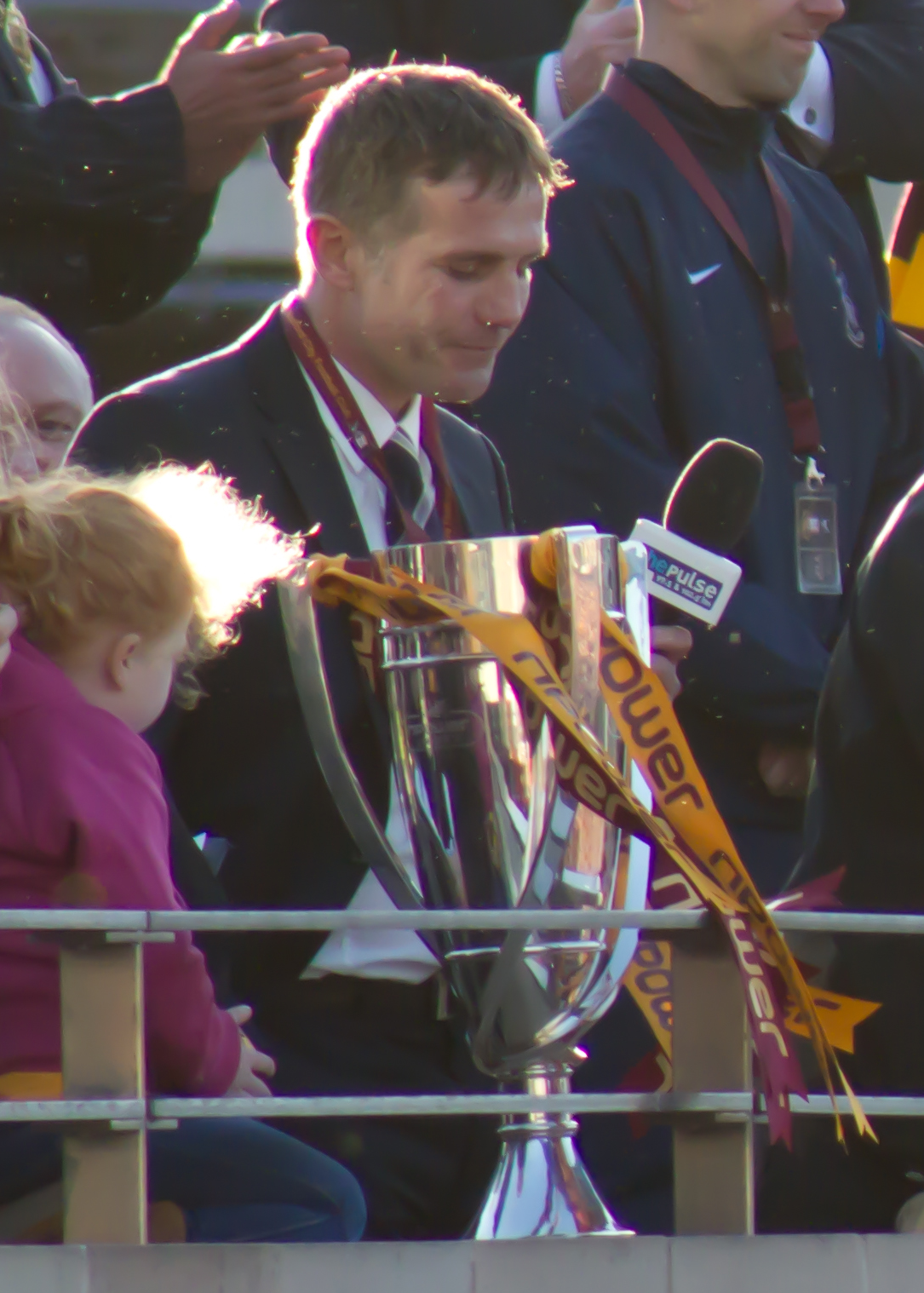
Parkinson with the League Two play-off trophy in 2013

Parkinson was appointed manager of EFL League Two club Bradford City on 28 August 2011. He won the League Two Manager of the Month award for December 2011 after victories over promotion candidates Shrewsbury Town and Crewe Alexandra. Parkinson also enjoyed a promising run in the Johnstones Paint Trophy with the Bantams taking them to the Northern division semi-finals with victories over Yorkshire rivals Sheffield Wednesday and Sheffield United as well as an away victory against local rivals Huddersfield Town on penalties, before their run ended with a defeat to Oldham Athletic. He led Bradford to safety finishing 18th in League Two, then stating that he wanted a promotion push for next season.

On 11 December 2012, Parkinson's Bradford side progressed to the semi-final of the League Cup following an historic victory over Premier League club Arsenal after a penalty shoot-out.

Parkinson then led Bradford to another historic victory in the first leg of the League Cup semi-finals at Valley Parade, defeating Premier League Aston Villa 3–1 in front of 23,245 fans. Despite a 2–1 defeat in the second leg at Villa Park, Bradford won the tie 4–3 on aggregate to progress to the 2013 League Cup Final at Wembley Stadium. In the final, Bradford lost 5–0 to Premier League Swansea City. After the match, Parkinson criticised referee Kevin Friend for sending Matt Duke off, which resulted in a penalty and described the match as "harsh".

His role in taking Bradford City to the League Cup final resulted in him being rewarded with the Outstanding Managerial Achievement award. In a statement, Parkinson said, "I'm very honoured to receive this award. My name might be on it but it is a team award – not just the team on the pitch but the team off it as well." A strong run of form towards the end of the season secured City a playoff place. After a win over two legs against Burton Albion, Bradford City were promoted to League One after beating Northampton Town, 3–0. After the match, reflecting on all that Parkinson and the rest of the team had achieved during this remarkable season, he said it was beyond his wildest dreams. Shortly after, Parkinson signed a new three-year deal with the club, along with coaches Steve Parkin and Nick Allamby.

Parkinson would follow up the groundbreaking 2012–13 cup upsets with a historic 4–2 victory over Chelsea in the FA Cup at Stamford Bridge on 24 January 2015. Bradford City went 2–0 down in the first half, but fought back in stunning fashion to record what Robbie Fowler called the "greatest FA Cup upset of all time". Fans of Bradford City have gone on to call him the real "special one" following the win at Stamford Bridge. Bradford are still the only team, at any level, to have ever overcome a 2–0 deficit at Stamford Bridge and win during the reign of José Mourinho. Mourinho entered the Bradford dressing room after the game and shook the hand of every player as a sign of his respect.

Bradford City followed up their historic victory against Chelsea with a 2–0 win in the fifth round at home to Sunderland on 15 February 2015. Their cup run ended in the quarter-final with a 3–0 defeat to Championship side Reading on 16 March.

Bradford reached the League One play-offs in the 2015–16 season under Parkinson's management, but exited at the semi-finals after being beaten 4–2 on aggregate over two legs by Millwall.

Parkinson was the fifth-longest-serving manager in English league football at the conclusion of the 2015–16 season, having been with Bradford for four years and 286 days. His time in charge of the club came to an end in June 2016, however, as Parkinson left Bradford to join Bolton Wanderers, who had recently been relegated into League One.

=== Bolton Wanderers ===
On 10 June 2016, both Parkinson and assistant manager Steve Parkin signed two-year deals to join Bradford's fellow League One side Bolton, thus ending Wanderers' three-month search for a replacement for Neil Lennon. Parkinson led Bolton to an unbeaten first month of the season, topping the table and winning League One's August Manager of the Month award. This was Bolton's best start to a season in 82 years. After failing to win any games in September, Parkinson was named manager of the month again for October – his second in the first three months of the season. Parkinson won the award for the third time that season in March 2017, with Bolton seven points clear of third place.

Bolton ended the season with a 3–0 win against Peterborough United which was enough to seal promotion back to the Championship at the first attempt as runners up. Bolton finished on 86 points, four points ahead of Scunthorpe United in third. Promotion was achieved in spite of the club being under a transfer embargo imposed by the EFL, with Bolton limited to free transfers and short-term loan deals, whilst remaining under a pre-determined wage cap.

Parkinson's newly promoted Bolton side struggled at the beginning of the 2017–18 season, only earning their first win of the season against Sheffield Wednesday in mid-October, as the club languished at the foot of the Championship table with just five points from 12 games, six points adrift of safety. Parkinson's side would subsequently embark on a six-game unbeaten run following the win, however the club remained inside the relegation zone at its conclusion, having drawn five of the six games. Such was the poor start to the season, it took Parkinson's reinvigorated Bolton side until early December to emerge from the relegation zone, after beating Barnsley 3–1 at home. Bolton earned their first away victory of the season on 30 December 2017, with a 1–0 win at high-flying Sheffield United, followed by a 1–0 win against Hull City on New Year's Day, to emerge from the relegation zone. Bolton's improved results coincided with Gary Madine hitting form, with the striker scoring the goals in both victories to bring his tally for the season up to nine goals. They narrowly avoided relegation by winning the last match of the season.

In the 2018–19 season, Bolton were in financial straits and looking for a new owner. They were unable to pay players towards the end of the season and were relegated to League One. In May, the club entered administration due to unpaid taxes, incurring a 12-point penalty for the 2019–20 season. By the start of that season, Bolton had not yet found a buyer and were reduced to fielding junior players. On 10 August, they fielded their youngest ever side, with an average age of 19, against Coventry City. Parkinson postponed their following game against Doncaster Rovers, expressing concern about the welfare of the youth players, and resigned the following day, on 21 August 2019.

=== Sunderland ===
On 17 October 2019, Parkinson was unveiled as the Sunderland manager on a two-and-a-half-year contract. That season was cut short by the COVID-19 pandemic. The following season, he parted company with Sunderland on 29 November 2020.

=== Wrexham ===
On 1 July 2021, Parkinson was appointed manager of National League side Wrexham on a 12-month rolling contract. Parkinson was awarded the National League Manager of the Month award for March 2022 after leading the team to four wins and a draw. This award came two days after Wrexham had defeated league leaders Stockport County 2–0 in the FA Trophy semi-final to win a place in the final at Wembley against Bromley. In the final, Wrexham would finish as runners-up to Bromley. In the league, they finished second behind Stockport County before losing 5–4 at home to Grimsby Town in the play-off semi-finals. In the following season, Wrexham, under Parkinson, achieved promotion to League Two as National League champions in the 2022–23 season. This marked a return for Wrexham to the English Football League after a 15-year absence. Wrexham would ultimately accrue 111 points in total, four points clear of Notts County in second place. The 111 league points total set a record for the top five divisions of English league football. In their 2023–24 League Two campaign, they would achieve a second successive promotion in second place behind Stockport County.

Wrexham's impressive form carried over into the 2024–25 season in League One, an unbeaten four games to start the season seeing Parkinson named League One Manager of the Month for August 2024. On 4 January 2025, Parkinson coached his 1,000th game as Wrexham beat Peterborough United 1–0. He was named manager of the month once again for March 2025 following sixteen points from seven matches. The team finished the season in second with 92 points, setting a team record for score in the EFL. Parkinson had managed the team through three successive promotions, a first in the upper divisions of both English and Welsh football.

He subsequently led them to a record best 7th place finish in their return to the Championship, narrowly missing out on the playoffs on the final matchday following a 2–2 draw with Middlesbrough and Hull City’s victory over Norwich City. This marked the club’s highest-ever league finish.

== Managerial statistics ==
As of match played 21 November 2026

Managerial record by team and tenure
Team	From	To	Record					Ref.
Team	From	To	P	W	D	L	Win %	Ref.
Colchester United	25 February 2003	14 June 2006	187	79	54	54	42.2	
Hull City	29 June 2006	4 December 2006	24	5	6	13	20.8	
Charlton Athletic	22 November 2008	4 January 2011	114	44	37	33	38.6	
Bradford City	28 August 2011	10 June 2016	274	101	86	87	36.9	
Bolton Wanderers	10 June 2016	21 August 2019	157	49	34	74	31.2	
Sunderland	17 October 2019	29 November 2020	48	19	15	14	39.6	
Wrexham	1 July 2021	Present	291	163	70	58	56.0	(Note: Soccerbase omits Wrexham's 2021–22 FA Trophy quarter-final win against Notts County and the 2022–23 FA Cup 4th qualifying round matches in which they beat Blyth Spartans after a replay.)
Total			1,095	460	302	333	42.0	

== Honours ==
=== Player ===
Reading

- Football League Second Division: 1993–94
- Football League Second Division second-placed promotion: 2001–02

Individual

- Reading Player of the Season: 1997–98, 1998–99

=== Manager ===
Colchester United

- Football League One second-place promotion: 2005–06

Bradford City

- Football League Two play-offs: 2013
- Football League Cup runner-up: 2012–13

Bolton Wanderers

- EFL League One second-place promotion: 2016–17

Wrexham

- EFL League One second-place promotion: 2024–25
- EFL League Two second-place promotion: 2023–24
- National League: 2022–23
- FA Trophy runner-up: 2021–22

Individual

- LMA Special Merit Award: 2013
- LMA FA Cup Manager of the Year: 2015
- Football League/EFL Outstanding Managerial Achievement: 2013
- Football League/EFL League One Manager of the Month: March 2003, January 2006, August 2009, November 2010, December 2014, August 2016, October 2016, March 2017, January 2020, August 2024, March 2025
- Football League/EFL League Two Manager of the Month: December 2011
- National League Manager of the Month: March 2022, September 2022, January 2023
- National League Manager of the Season: 2022–23

== See also ==
- List of football managers with the most matches
