= Martyn Booty =

English footballer (born 1971)

Personal information
- Full name: Martyn James Booty
- Date of birth: 30 May 1971 (age 55)
- Place of birth: Kirby Muxloe, England
- Position: Defender

Youth career
- Coventry City

Senior career*
Years	Team	Apps	(Gls)
1989–1993	Coventry City	5	(0)
1993–1996	Crewe Alexandra	96	(5)
1996–1999	Reading	64	(1)
1999	→ Southend United (loan)	6	(0)
1999–2001	Southend United	74	(0)
2001–2003	Chesterfield	77	(2)
2003–2004	Huddersfield Town	4	(0)
2008	Curzon Ashton	3	(0)
2008	Salford City	3	(0)
2008–2009	Buxton	3	(0)

Managerial career
- 2007: Huddersfield Town (joint-caretaker manager)
- 2009–2011: Curzon Ashton (assistant manager)
- 2011–2012: Hyde United (assistant manager)
- 2015–2016: Hyde United (assistant manager)
- * Club domestic league appearances and goals

Martyn James Booty (born 30 May 1971) is an English former professional footballer who played as a defender. He made more than 300 appearances in the Football League for Coventry City, Crewe Alexandra, Reading, Southend United, Chesterfield and Huddersfield Town. He had two spells as Assistant Manager of Hyde United F.C.

His son Regan plays for Borehamwood F.C.

== Career ==
=== Early career ===
Born in Kirby Muxloe, Leicestershire, but grew up in Anstey with his parents Nell and John, and brother Michael. He started his football career as a trainee at Coventry City, but struggled to break into the first team.

=== The Football League ===
After leaving Highfield Road, he moved to Crewe Alexandra, Reading, Southend United and Chesterfield. In 2003, Peter Jackson, who had just been re-appointed manager of Huddersfield Town, brought Booty in to help with the club's revitalisation following two relegations in three seasons, but he picked up an injury and only played four games during that season. At the end of the season, Jackson appointed Booty to the coaching staff, a role which he held until May 2008.

=== Non-league ===
At the beginning of the 2008–09 season, he joined Northern Premier League side Curzon Ashton as a player, moving on first to Salford City and then Buxton. Before the 2009–10 season, Booty rejoined Curzon Ashton as assistant manager.

In May 2011, Booty followed Gary Lowe to Hyde, where he became Lowe's assistant manager, signing a one-year contract at the club.
