= Michael Meaker =

Welsh footballer and coach

Personal information
- Full name: Michael John Meaker
- Date of birth: 18 August 1971 (age 55)
- Place of birth: Greenford, England
- Position: Midfielder

Youth career
- –1990: Queens Park Rangers

Senior career*
| Years | Team | Apps | (Gls) |
| 1990–1995 | Queens Park Rangers | 34 | (1) |
| 1991 | → Plymouth Argyle (loan) | 4 | (0) |
| 1995–1998 | Reading | 67 | (2) |
| 1998–2001 | Bristol Rovers | 27 | (2) |
| 2000 | → Swindon Town (loan) | 6 | (0) |
| 2001 | Plymouth Argyle | 11 | (1) |
| 2001–2002 | Northwich Victoria | 8 | (1) |
| 2002–2004 | Southall Town | 56 | (43) |
| 2004 | Henley Town | 13 | (16) |
| 2004–2005 | Mangotsfield United | 18 | (4) |
| 2005–2006 | Hounslow Borough | 34 | (41) |
| 2006 | Mangotsfield United | 7 | (0) |
| 2006–2007 | Hounslow Borough | 0 | (0) |
| 2007–2009 | Bitton | | |
| 2007 | → Paulton Rovers (loan) | | |
| 2009–2011 | Mangotsfield United | 84 | (19) |
| 2011–2015 | Yate Town | 18 | (3) |
| 2015–2018 | Taunton Town | 5 | (0) |
| 2018–2019 | Truro City | 0 | (0) |
| 2019–2023 | Taunton Town | 2 | (0) |
| Total | | 394 | (133) |

International career
| | Wales U-21 | 8 | (0) |
| | Wales B | 1 | (0) |
| | Wales | 2 | (0) |

Managerial career
- 2011–2015: Yate Town (player-assistant)
- 2015–2018: Taunton Town (player-assistant)
- 2018–2019: Truro City (player-assistant)
- 2019–: Taunton Town (player-assistant)
- * Club domestic league appearances and goals

Michael John Meaker (born 18 August 1971) is a Welsh football coach and former player who played as a midfielder.

== Club career ==
Meaker began his career at Queens Park Rangers, where he played in the FA Premier League. While at QPR, he had a loan spell at Plymouth Argyle. In July 1995 Reading paid £550,000 for his services, and he went on to make 67 appearances for the club before moving to Bristol Rovers in the summer of 1998. He had a loan spell at Swindon Town in 2000, before returning to Plymouth in 2001. He has also played for Northwich Victoria, Henley Town, Southall Town, Mangotsfield United and Hounslow Borough, and in the summer of 2006 he re-joined Mangotsfield for a second spell at the club.

Although not a prolific goalscorer for most of his career, during the 2005–06 season at Hounslow he broke the club record for most league goals in a season (41), and scored a total of 44 in all competitions.

He is a Masters Football Legend helping QPR win the London Masters in 2009 and 2010.

Employed as a coach at Taunton Town since 2019, Meaker also remains registered as a player at the club, making his most recent appearance in a 4–1 win over Paulton Rovers in the semi-finals of the Southern League Cup in January 2022, aged 50.

== International career ==
Meaker was capped twice for the Wales under-21 national team, and made one appearance for the country's B team. He was also called up to the senior national team in 1995 for UEFA Euro 1996 qualifying matches against Bulgaria on 29 March and Georgia on 7 June.

== Coaching ==
Meaker now runs the No.1 Football Academy at the David Lloyd Westbury Health Club in Bristol.

In his time at Yate Town, Meaker was both registered as a player and was also assistant manager for the first team.

From 2015 to 2018, he had the same role at Taunton Town. As of season 2021-22 is still a player-coach at the same club.

In September 2018, Meaker joined Truro City as assistant manager to Leigh Robinson; he was also registered as a player, being listed as a substitute for the 5–0 defeat to Stockport County in the FA Trophy on 12 January 2019. Both Robinson and Meaker departed the club in March 2019.
