= Jamie Lambert =

English footballer

Personal information
- Full name: Christopher James Paul Lambert
- Date of birth: 14 September 1973 (age 53)
- Place of birth: Henley-on-Thames, England
- Position: Midfielder

Senior career*
Years	Team	Apps	(Gls)
1992–1999	Reading	124	(16)
1998	→ Walsall (loan)	6	(0)
1999–2000	Oxford United	13	(2)
2000–2001	Slough Town	19	(2)
2003	Basingstoke Town	8	(1)
Total		170	(21)
- * Club domestic league appearances and goals

Christopher James Lambert (born 14 September 1973) is an English former professional footballer.
