= Jimmy Quinn (footballer, born 1959) =

Northern Irish footballer (born 1959)

Personal information
- Full name: James Martin Quinn
- Date of birth: 18 November 1959 (age 67)
- Place of birth: Belfast, Northern Ireland
- Height: 1.83 m (6 ft 0 in)
- Position: Striker

Senior career*
Years	Team	Apps	(Gls)
1977–1978	Whitchurch Alport		
1978–1980	Congleton Town		
1980–1981	Oswestry Town		
1981–1984	Swindon Town	49	(10)
1984–1986	Blackburn Rovers	71	(17)
1986–1988	Swindon Town	64	(30)
1988–1989	Leicester City	31	(6)
1989	Bradford City	35	(14)
1989–1991	West Ham United	47	(18)
1991–1992	AFC Bournemouth	43	(19)
1992–1997	Reading	182	(71)
1997–1998	Peterborough United	49	(25)
1999–2000	Swindon Town	7	(0)
2000	Northwich Victoria	7	(4)
2000	Hereford United	2	(0)
2000–2001	Highworth Town		
2001	Hayes	11	(6)
2001–2003	Northwich Victoria	46	(8)
2003–2004	Shrewsbury Town	15	(4)
2005–2006	Nantwich Town		
Total		659	(232)

International career
1985–1996	Northern Ireland	46	(12)

Managerial career
- 1994–1997: Reading
- 1998–2000: Swindon Town
- 2001–2003: Northwich Victoria
- 2003–2004: Shrewsbury Town
- 2005–2006: Egersunds IK
- 2006–2008: Cambridge United
- 2008: AFC Bournemouth
- 2011–2013: Nantwich Town
- * Club domestic league appearances and goals

James Martin Quinn (born 18 November 1959) is a Northern Irish former footballer and manager.

Quinn was capped 46 times for his country and is one of Northern Ireland's top goalscorers, scoring twelve goals at senior level. He also enjoyed a successful club career, scoring 210 goals in the Football League, and has enjoyed some success as a manager, including winning promotion to the Football League with Shrewsbury Town in 2004 and taking Reading to the brink of the Premier League in 1995.

== Club career ==
Quinn had a club career spanning eighteen years for a number of lower division clubs, during which he was a prolific scorer at centre forward. The pinnacle of his league football career was winning the Second Division "Golden Boot" award for the 1993–94 season, having scored 40 goals for Reading, who were promoted as champions. Quinn was known for his towering aerial presence and a keen eye for goal.

Quinn began in non-league football with Whitchurch Alport and joined Nantwich Town in the 1979 close season from where he moved on to Congleton Town. He stepped up to League football at Swindon Town, John Trollope signing him from non-league Oswestry Town for £10,000 in December 1981, the first of three spells at Swindon's County Ground.

He had to wait three months for his debut, coming on as a substitute in a 2–2 draw with Walsall, on 9 March 1982. He made his full debut at the end of the season, forming an attacking partnership with Paul Rideout, in a 3–2 win over Oxford United on 4 May. It did not help Swindon, who were relegated to the Fourth Division at the end of the season, for the first time in their history.

It took Quinn another whole season before he became a first team regular. He bagged a brace in a 7–0 demolition of Kettering Town in the FA Cup, and was given his chance in the next league match, when he again scored twice against Mansfield Town. Another goal in his next game cemented his place in the starting line-up, and Quinn missed just four of the remaining matches of the season. He really shone in the FA Cup, scoring six goals in five games, including one in a 2–1 home defeat by Second Division Blackburn Rovers. His performance obviously impressed them – at the end of the season Rovers signed Quinn for £32,500.

After scoring 23 goals in 83 appearances for Rovers, Lou Macari persuaded Quinn to return to the County Ground in December 1986, for a fee of £50,000. He went straight into the starting line-up, and helped Swindon to a playoff place in the Third Division, with ten goals. Quinn missed the play-off final replay versus Gillingham through injury, but Swindon sealed promotion to the Second Division.

The following season, Quinn was in fine form, scoring 31 goals in all competitions. When his contract expired in June 1988, Macari did his best to persuade Quinn to stay, but his efforts proved fruitless. Quinn agreed terms with Leicester City, and a tribunal set the fee at £210,000.

Quinn's stay at Leicester lasted less than nine months, and he scored a mere six goals from 31 appearances, most of which were as a substitute. In March 1989, he moved to Bradford City for £210,000, where he scored 14 goals in 35 games before moving again in December 1989, this time to West Ham United, who had recently been relegated from the First Division. The fee was £320,000, the highest sum paid for Quinn during his career. During his time at the club, Quinn scored eighteen league goals in forty-seven games, playing a part in their return to the First Division. It was here that Quinn earned his nickname of "Jimmy the Tree", as he did not seem very mobile on the pitch although he did score a good return of goals helping West Ham return to the First Division in 1991. However, Quinn did not play in the top flight, instead transferring to AFC Bournemouth of the Third Division at the start of the 1991–92 season. Although he only spent a single season at the south coast club, he scored nineteen goals in forty-three games.

He signed for Reading from Bournemouth in July 1992. He went on to make 294 appearances for the Royals, scoring 94 goals in the process. Reading were promoted from the Second Division in the summer of 1994 with the help of 35 league goals from 34-year-old Quinn (the top scorer in the entire Football League), and were comfortable in the First Division when manager Mark McGhee acrimoniously left Reading in the following December.

In total, Quinn played 578 games in the Football League, scoring 210 goals. He also scored twenty-two goals in forty-six appearances in the FA Cup, and sixteen goals in thirty-five appearances in the League Cup. In a vote to compile Reading's best-ever eleven, Quinn was voted the best striker with 35.4% of the vote. He scored five goals in his final (2003–04) league season playing for Shrewsbury, during which he turned 44 years of age.

After his League career ended, Quinn turned out for a number of non-league clubs and his career went full circle when he returned to Nantwich Town, playing for the club beyond the age of 46 and helping the Dabbers on their run to the 2006 FA Vase Final before finally hanging up his boots at the end of that season.

== International career ==
Quinn was a full international for Northern Ireland for 11 years, winning 46 caps and scoring 12 goals, making him one of the highest scorers in their history. His goals included a volley from outside the area against Northern Ireland's neighbours Republic of Ireland, and the goal which helped Northern Ireland qualify for the 1986 World Cup; his goal against Romania in a 1–0 was followed up by a 0–0 draw against England to secure qualification for a second successive World Cup Finals. He was Reading's most capped player for several years, until Kevin Doyle beat his record of 17 international caps with the club.

=== International goals ===
Scores and results list Northern Ireland's goal tally first

Goal	Date	Venue	Opponent	Score	Result	Competition
1	16 October 1984	Belfast, Northern Ireland	Israel	2–0	3–0	Friendly match
2	16 October 1985	Bucharest, Romania	Romania	1–0	1–0	1986 FIFA World Cup qualification
3	23 April 1986	Belfast, Northern Ireland	Morocco	2–1	2–1	Friendly match
4	11 November 1987	Belfast, Northern Ireland	Turkey	1–0	1–0	UEFA Euro 1988 qualifying
5	21 May 1988	Belfast, Northern Ireland	Malta	1–0	3–0	1990 FIFA World Cup qualification
6	27 March 1990	Belfast, Northern Ireland	Norway	1–0	2–3	Friendly match
7	8 September 1993	Belfast, Northern Ireland	Latvia	1–0	2–0	1994 FIFA World Cup qualification
8	17 November 1993	Belfast, Northern Ireland	Republic of Ireland	1–0	1–1	1994 FIFA World Cup qualification
9	20 April 1994	Belfast, Northern Ireland	Liechtenstein	1–0	4–1	UEFA Euro 1996 qualifying
10	20 April 1994	Belfast, Northern Ireland	Liechtenstein	3–0	4–1	UEFA Euro 1996 qualifying
11	7 September 1994	Belfast, Northern Ireland	Portugal	1–1	1–2	UEFA Euro 1996 qualifying
12	11 October 1995	Eschen, Liechtenstein	Liechtenstein	3–0	4–0	UEFA Euro 1996 qualifying

== Management career ==
Quinn was appointed joint player-manager of Reading with Mick Gooding in December 1994 on the departure of Mark McGhee to Leicester City. Under their guidance, Reading finished second in Division One, but were denied automatic promotion to the Premier League as it was being reduced from 22 teams to 20 that season. Instead Reading were left to battle for Premier League football via the play-offs. Quinn scored the final goal in a 4–3 defeat to Bolton Wanderers, making Reading the only team to finish second in English football's second tier and not get promoted.

He left two years later after Reading endured two difficult seasons, during which they battled against relegation. He joined Peterborough United where he scored 25 league goals in his first season and was elected to the PFA Division Three team. The downside of the season was that the 38-year-old Quinn's prolific goalscoring was not enough to achieve promotion for the Cambridgeshire club.

In October 1998, Quinn returned to Swindon as manager following the departure of Steve McMahon. Chairman Rikki Hunt declared that he wanted someone who would die for Swindon Town – he chose Quinn. Little did he know it was to be an impossible task. Quinn managed to keep Swindon in Division One in the 1998–99 season, but his first full season in charge proved to be a disaster – with the club in dire financial straits, they fell into administration, players were sold, and no money was available to replace them. Now 40 years old, Quinn was even forced to don the Swindon shirt again, taking the number 40 shirt! Swindon Town were rock bottom from mid-November until the end of the season, breaking a club record of nineteen games without a win in the process. After relegation was confirmed, Quinn was removed after six of the seven new board members decided he should go – despite the impossible circumstances. Colin Todd was appointed as manager within days, fuelling speculation that the club's new owners had done a deal before Quinn was ousted.

Following his departure from Swindon, Quinn had brief spells as a player at Northwich Victoria and Hereford United of the Football Conference, Highworth Town of the Hellenic Football League, and Hayes of the Conference. In July 2001, Quinn returned to Northwich, this time as manager, although he also appeared for the club 46 times, scoring eight times.

Quinn moved to recently relegated Shrewsbury Town at the start of the 2003–04 season, and secured their immediate return to the Football League by winning the Conference playoff final. Despite being 44, Quinn made 15 Conference appearances and scored four goals.

Quinn resigned in October 2004, with Shrewsbury finding life hard back in the Football League. He returned briefly to Peterborough as assistant manager, and then became manager of Norwegian Division Three club Egersunds in December 2005. Despite a very successful spell, Quinn resigned after just five months, citing personal reasons. On 15 September 2006 Quinn was appointed manager of Conference National strugglers Cambridge United, signing a two-year contract, with his former Peterborough teammate Steve Castle as his assistant. United chairman Lee Power claimed that Quinn "filled all our criteria" for the job.

After struggling with Cambridge United for much of the 2006–07 season, Quinn led them to 17th place, avoiding relegation to the Conference South on the final day of the season. After bringing in Alan Lewer as his new Assistant, he led the U's to an impressive start to the following season, which saw them top the division after an unbeaten start to the season. He also oversaw a Boxing Day victory over local rivals Histon. Mark Albrighton's goal gave them a 1–0 victory at a packed Abbey Stadium, and revenge for the 5–0 thumping Histon gave the U's in the FA Trophy in December 2006.

Quinn led his Cambridge side to the play-offs in the 2007–08 season – beating Burton Albion 4–3 on aggregate in the semi-finals to set up a final against Exeter City at Wembley. In June 2008, Quinn parted company with the club by mutual consent after lengthy talks with chairman Phillip Law.

On 2 September 2008, Quinn was named as the new Bournemouth manager, replacing Kevin Bond who was sacked the previous day. After 121 days on 31 December, Quinn was sacked after a run of poor results, including a 2–0 loss at home to fellow relegation battlers, Barnet.

In March 2011, Quinn was appointed manager of Nantwich Town in the Northern Premier League. He left by mutual consent on 15 March 2013.

== Honours ==
=== Player ===
Swindon Town

- Division Three play-offs: 1986–87

West Ham

- Football League Second Division runner-up: 1990–91

Reading

- Football League Second Division: 1993–94

Individual

- PFA Team of the Year: 1993–94 Second Division, 1997–98 Third Division
- Football League Third Division Golden Boot: 1993–94

=== Manager ===
Shrewsbury Town

- Conference National play-offs: 2004
