= Andy Bernal =

Australian soccer player

Personal information
- Full name: Andrew Bernal
- Date of birth: 16 May 1966 (age 60)
- Place of birth: Canberra, Australia
- Height: 1.78 m (5 ft 10 in)
- Position: Defender

Youth career
- 1983–1985: AIS

Senior career*
Years	Team	Apps	(Gls)
1985-1988	Sporting Gijon		
1985–1986	Albacete Balompié	23	
1986–1987	Xerez CD	38	
1988	Nottingham Forest	0	(0)
1987–1988	Ipswich Town	9	(0)
1989–1994	Sydney Olympic	113	(6)
1994–2000	Reading	187	(2)

International career
1990–1996	Australia	13	(0)
- * Club domestic league appearances and goals

Andrew Bernal (born 16 May 1966) is an Australian former professional soccer defender and pioneer who played in Australia, England, and Spain. He was later an agent and personal manager for David Beckham. In 2021, he wrote and released his autobiography Riding Shotgun – The Original Wizard of Oz. He currently works for the A-League football club Brisbane Roar as head of individual development.

== Early life ==
Bernal was born in 1966 in Canberra to Spanish-born parents.

== Playing career ==
=== Club career ===
After graduating from the Australian Institute of Sport, Bernal became the first Australian to play for a La Liga club when he joined Sporting Gijon. Gijon had intended to play him in their youth teams, however, as an Australia underage representative, he was classified as a foreigner, meaning he was not eligible. He went on to play almost 100 games of Spanish club football whilst on loan to Albacete Balompié and Xerez. Faced with compulsory military service as a Spanish citizen, Bernal chose to leave Spain and signed for Ipswich Town in September 1987. Returning to England from an Australian holiday, it was found that Bernal was playing on a student holiday visa and his English stint was cut shot.

In August 1988, Bernal signed with the Sydney Olympic ahead of the 1989 National Soccer League.

In 1994, he joined English team Reading in England for a reported £30,000 fee. He was part of the Reading team that narrowly missed out on promotion to the Premier League in the 1994–95 season. Bernal retired at the end of the 1999–2000 season, having made 187 league appearances.

=== International career ===
Bernal has also played for the Australian national team on 21 occasions between 1989 and 1996, 13 times in full international matches and eight in B internationals.
