= Nick Hammond =

English footballer (born 1967)

Personal information
- Full name: Nicholas David Hammond
- Date of birth: 7 September 1967 (age 59)
- Place of birth: Hornchurch, England
- Height: 6 ft 0 in (1.83 m)
- Position: Goalkeeper

Senior career*
Years	Team	Apps	(Gls)
1985–1987	Arsenal		
1986	→Bristol Rovers (loan)	3	(0)
1986	→ Peterborough Utd (loan)	0	(0)
1987	→ Aberdeen (loan)		
1987–1995	Swindon Town	67	(0)
1995–1996	Plymouth Argyle	4	(0)
1996–2000	Reading	24	(0)
- * Club domestic league appearances and goals

Nicholas David Hammond (born 7 September 1967 in Hornchurch, England) is an English former football goalkeeper and a current football advisor for Everton.

== Playing career ==
Hammond was an Arsenal apprentice, making his league début whilst on loan at Bristol Rovers in 1986, followed by further loan spells at Peterborough United and Aberdeen.

Hammond joined Swindon Town on a free transfer in July 1987, and while there he twice broke his leg which resulted in him taking the number 23 shirt for the 1993–94 FA Premier League campaign, rather than the unlucky number 13. He was one of four goalkeepers used by Swindon throughout that season alongside Fraser Digby, Jon Sheffield and Paul Heald.

A short spell at Plymouth Argyle culminated in a loan to Reading in December 1995, with the move being made permanent for £40,000 a month later. Hammond was given a goalkeeper coaching role by Alan Pardew and he subsequently retired from playing after suffering a recurrent back injury.

== Coaching career ==
In October 2000, Hammond took over from John Stephenson to become Reading's Youth Academy Director, and was appointed the Club's first-ever Director of Football in September 2003.

In April 2016, Hammond ended his 20-year association with Reading to become Technical Director at West Bromwich Albion. In June 2019, Scottish Premiership club Celtic appointed Hammond to a recruitment consultancy role. Celtic then named him as their head of football operations in October 2019.

In December 2021, Hammond was appointed as an interim transfer consultant by Newcastle United.

His next appointment would come in June 2023 as 'interim football advisor' for Leeds United. Hired on a short-term contract to 'help support the club during the summer transfer window'.

In November 2023 it was confirmed by Phil Hay that he would be staying on as a transfer consultant at Leeds until the end of next summer.
