= Martin Williams (footballer) =

English footballer (born 1973)

Personal information
- Full name: Martin Keith Williams
- Date of birth: 12 July 1973 (age 53)
- Place of birth: Luton, England
- Height: 1.75 m (5 ft 9 in)
- Position: Striker

Youth career
- 1990–1991: Leicester City

Senior career*
| Years | Team | Apps | (Gls) |
| 1991–1995 | Luton Town | 40 | (2) |
| 1995 | → Colchester United (loan) | 3 | (0) |
| 1995–2000 | Reading | 127 | (26) |
| 1995 | → Bangor (loan) | 3 | (1) |
| 2000–2001 | Swindon Town | 19 | (2) |
| 2001 | → Peterborough United (loan) | 15 | (2) |
| 2001–2003 | Stevenage Borough | 47 | (5) |
| 2003 | Woking | 10 | (1) |
- St Neots Town
- Dunstable Town
- Arlesey Town
| 2007–2010 | Windsor & Eton | | |
- * Club domestic league appearances and goals

Martin Keith Williams (born 12 July 1973 in Luton, England) is a former professional football striker, most famously for Reading. Whilst at Reading he played on loan for Irish Football League side Bangor F.C.

He spent his youth career at Leicester City, where he stayed from 1 August 1990 to 13 September 1991, at which point he came to Luton Town on a free transfer, marking the beginning of his senior career.

At Luton, he had 40 appearances, mostly as a substitute. He also made his career debut FA Cup and League Cup appearances with the team.

From March 1995 to May 1995, he was sent out on loan to Colchester, during which time he earned three starts.

He played for Windsor and Eton from 2007 to 2010 in the Southern League Premier Division.

In the summer of 2022, Williams was appointed manager of Wessex Football League side Whitchurch United F.C.

Since retiring from football, Williams now spends his older years living a quiet life in Hampshire.
