= Steve Swales =

English footballer

Personal information
- Date of birth: 26 December 1973 (age 52)
- Place of birth: Whitby, England
- Position: Defender

Senior career*
| Years | Team | Apps | (Gls) |
| 1992–1995 | Scarborough | 54 | (1) |
| 1995–1998 | Reading | 42 | (1) |
| 1998–2001 | Hull City | 67 | (0) |
| 2001–2002 | Halifax Town | 24 | (1) |
| 2002–2004 | Whitby Town | ? | (?) |
| 2004–2005 | Pickering Town | ? | (?) |
| 2005–200? | Bridlington Town | ? | (?) |
- * Club domestic league appearances and goals

Steve Swales (born 26 December 1973) is an English footballer who played in The Football League for Scarborough, Reading, Hull City and Halifax Town, before dropping into non-League football.
