= 1992–93 Reading F.C. season =

Reading
1992–93 season
- Chairman: John Madejski
- Manager: Mark McGhee (Player Manager)
- Stadium: Elm Park
- Second Division: 8th
- FA Cup: Third round
- League Cup: Second round
- League Trophy: Second round
- Top goalscorer: League: Jimmy Quinn (17); All: Jimmy Quinn (23)
Home colours

During the 1992–93 English football season, Reading F.C. competed in the Football League Second Division. In 1991, following the breakaway of the 22 First Division clubs to form the Premier League, the Football League divisions were renamed. As a result of the re-branding, the Third Division was renamed the Second Division. Reading went on to finish 8th in the league, missing out on the play-offs by 3 points, reached the Third round of the FA Cup and the Second round of both the League Cup and League Trophy.

== Squad ==
As of match played 8 May 1993

Name	Nationality	Position	Date of birth (Age (Note: Age as of the end of the season))	Signed from	Signed in	Contract ends	Apps.	Goals
Goalkeepers
Steve Francis	(England)	GK	29 May 1964 (aged 28)	Chelsea	1987			
Shaka Hislop	(England) (Note: Shaka Hislop was born in Hackney, England, and represented England at U-21 level, but also qualified to represent Trinidad and Tobago internationally and would make his international debut for Trinidad and Tobago in 2000.)	GK	22 February 1969 (aged 24)	Howard Bison	1992		16	0
Defenders
Mark Holzman	(England)	DF	21 February 1973 (aged 20)	Trainee	1991		42	1
Darren Jackson	(England)	DF	24 September 1971 (aged 21)	loan from Oxford United	1992		6	0
Darren McCance	(England)	DF	13 September 1973 (aged 19)	Trainee	1992		1	0
Keith McPherson	(England)	DF	11 September 1963 (aged 29)	Northampton Town	1990			
Steve Richardson	(England)	DF	11 February 1962 (aged 31)	Southampton	1982			
Adi Viveash	(England)	DF	30 September 1969 (aged 23)	loan from Swindon Town	1992	1993	6	1
Ady Williams	(England) (Note: Ady Williams was born in Reading, England, but also qualified to represent Wales internationally through his father, and would make his international debut for Wales on 23 May 1994.)	DF	16 September 1971 (aged 21)	Trainee	1989			
David McDonald	(Republic of Ireland)	DF	2 January 1971 (aged 22)	loan from Tottenham Hotspur	1993	1993	11	0
Jeff Hopkins	(Wales)	DF	14 April 1964 (aged 29)	Bristol Rovers	1992		44	1
Midfielders
David Bass	(England)	MF	29 November 1974 (aged 18)	Trainee	1991		8	0
Kevin Dillon	(England)	MF	18 December 1959 (aged 33)	Newcastle United	1991		80	4
Michael Gilkes	(England) (Note: Michael Gilkes was born in Hackney, England, but also qualified to represent Barbados internationally and would make his international debut for Barbados in 2000.)	MF	20 July 1965 (aged 27)	Leicester City	1984			
Mick Gooding	(England)	MF	12 April 1959 (aged 34)	Wolverhampton Wanderers	1989			
Tommy Jones	(England)	MF	7 October 1964 (aged 28)	Swindon Town	1992		26	1
Jamie Lambert	(England)	MF	14 September 1973 (aged 19)	Trainee	1992		35	3
Phil Parkinson	(England)	MF	1 December 1967 (aged 25)	Bury	1992		47	5
Scott Taylor	(England)	MF	23 November 1970 (aged 22)	Trainee	1989			
Forwards
Stuart Lovell	(Australia)	FW	9 January 1972 (aged 21)	Trainee	1990			
Lea Barkus	(England)	FW	7 December 1974 (aged 18)	Trainee	1991		17	0
Andy Gray	(England)	FW	25 October 1973 (aged 19)	Trainee	1991		13	3
Jimmy Quinn	(Northern Ireland)	FW	7 December 1959 (aged 33)	Bournemouth	1992		51	23
Mark McGhee (Player-Manager)	(Scotland)	FW	25 May 1957 (aged 35)	IK Brage	1991		50	7
Out on loan
Left during the season
Danny Bailey	(England)	MF	21 May 1964 (aged 28)	Exeter City	1990			
Paul Moody	(England)	FW	13 June 1967 (aged 25)	loan from Southampton	1992	1992	6	1

=== Left club during season ===
Note: Flags indicate national team as defined under FIFA eligibility rules; some limited exceptions apply. Players may hold more than one non-FIFA nationality.

Pos. / Nation / Player; MF / ENG / Danny Bailey (to Exeter City)	Pos. / Nation / Player; FW / ENG / Paul Moody (loan return to Southampton)

== Transfers ==
=== In ===
Date	Position	Nationality	Name	From	Fee	Ref.
3 July 1992	MF	(England)	Jamie Lambert	Trainee	Promoted	
9 July 1992	MF	(England)	Tommy Jones	Swindon Town	£125,000	
10 July 1992	MF	(England)	Phil Parkinson	Bury	£50,000	
13 July 1992	DF	(Wales)	Jeff Hopkins	Bristol Rovers	Free	
27 July 1992	FW	(Northern Ireland)	Jimmy Quinn	Bournemouth	£55,000	
9 September 1992	GK	(England)	Shaka Hislop	Howard University		

=== Out ===
Date	Position	Nationality	Name	To	Fee	Ref.
Summer 1992	MF	(Wales)	Linden Jones	Newport County		
Summer 1992	FW	(England)	Trevor Senior	Woking		
9 July 1992	FW	(England)	Craig Maskell	Swindon Town	£225,000	
20 July 1992	FW	(England)	David Robinson	Blackpool	Free	
7 December 1992	MF	(England)	Danny Bailey	Exeter City	Free	

=== Loans in ===
Date from	Position	Nationality	Name	From	Date to	Ref.
9 December 1992	FW	(England)	Paul Moody	Southampton	31 May 1993	
4 January 1993	DF	(England)	Adi Viveash	Swindon Town	31 May 1993	
6 March 1993	DF	(Republic of Ireland)	David McDonald	Tottenham Hotspur	31 May 1993	
	DF	(England)	Darren Jackson	Oxford United		

=== Loans out ===
Date from	Position	Nationality	Name	To	Date to	Ref.
29 July 1992	MF	(England)	Danny Bailey	Fulham	1 September 1992	

=== Released ===
Date	Position	Nationality	Name	Joined	Date
30 June 1993	DF	(England)	Steve Richardson	Newbury Town	
30 June 1993	FW	(Scotland)	Mark McGhee	Retired, appointed Reading Manager	1 July 1993

== Competitions ==
=== Division Two ===
==== Results ====
15 August 1992 1	Hartlepool United	1–1	Reading	Hartlepool
	Quinn	Report	Goal	Stadium: Victoria Park

22 August 1992 2	Reading	1–1	Leyton Orient	Reading
	McGhee	Report	Goal	Stadium: Elm Park

29 August 1992 3	Bolton Wanderers	2–1	Reading	Bolton
	Goal	Report	Williams	Stadium: Burnden Park

5 September 1992 4	Reading	1–2	Hull City	Reading
	Taylor	Report	Goal	Stadium: Elm Park

9 September 1992 5	West Bromwich Albion	3–0	Reading	West Bromwich
	Goal	Report		Stadium: The Hawthorns

16 September 1992 6	Reading	3–1	Rotherham United	Reading
	Quinn; Gilkes	Report	Goal	Stadium: Elm Park

19 September 1992 7	Reading	4–0	Wigan Athletic	Reading
	Quinn; Gilkes; Gooding	Report		Stadium: Elm Park

26 September 1992 8	Brighton & Hove Albion	0–1	Reading	Hove
		Report	Lovell	Stadium: Goldstone Ground

2 October 1992 9	Reading	3–0	Fulham	Reading
	Lovell; Quinn; Gilkes	Report		Stadium: Elm Park

10 October 1992 10	Huddersfield Town	0–0	Reading	Huddersfield
		Report		Stadium: Leeds Road

17 October 1992 11	Reading	1–1	Bradford City	Reading
	Gilkes	Report	Goal	Stadium: Elm Park

20 October 1992 12	Preston North End	2–0	Reading	Preston
	Goal	Report		Stadium: Deepdale

24 October 1992 13	Swansea City	2–1	Reading	Swansea
	Goal	Report	Williams	Stadium: Vetch Field

31 October 1992 14	Reading	3–0	Plymouth Argyle	Reading
	Jones; Quinn; McPherson	Report		Stadium: Elm Park

3 November 1992 15	Burnley	1–1	Reading	Burnley
	Goal	Report	McGhee	Stadium: Turf Moor

7 November 1992 16	Reading	0–0	Blackpool	Reading
		Report		Stadium: Elm Park

21 November 1992 17	Bournemouth	1–1	Reading	Bournemouth
	Goal	Report	Gilkes	Stadium: Dean Court

28 November 1992 18	Reading	2–3	Exeter City	Reading
	Quinn; Parkinson	Report	Goal	Stadium: Elm Park

12 December 1992 19	Chester City	0–3	Reading	Chester
		Report	Gilkes; Lambert	Stadium: Deva Stadium

19 December 1992 20	Reading	2–4	Stockport County	Reading
	Gilkes; Moody	Report	Goal	Stadium: Elm Park

26 December 1992 21	Reading	0–1	Stoke City	Reading
		Report	Goal	Stadium: Elm Park

28 December 1992 22	Mansfield Town	1–1	Reading	Mansfield
	Goal	Report	Lambert	Stadium: Field Mill

9 January 1993 23	Rotherham United	3–2	Reading	Rotherham
	Goal	Report	Quinn	Stadium: Millmoor

16 January 1993 24	Reading	3–0	Brighton & Hove Albion	Reading
	Taylor; Gooding	Report		Stadium: Elm Park

23 January 1993 25	Wigan Athletic	1–1	Reading	Wigan
	Goal	Report	Lambert	Stadium: Springfield Park

27 January 1993 26	Reading	1–2	Bolton Wanderers	Reading
	Williams	Report	Goal	Stadium: Elm Park

30 January 1993 27	Leyton Orient	1–2	Reading	Leyton
	Goal	Report	Dillon; Parkinson	Stadium: Brisbane Road

6 February 1993 28	Reading	2–0	Hartlepool United	Reading
	Williams; Quinn	Report		Stadium: Elm Park

13 February 1993 29	Hull City	1–1	Reading	Kingston upon Hull
	Goal	Report	Gray	Stadium: Boothferry Park

20 February 1993 30	Reading	4–0	Preston North End	Reading
	Taylor; Gilkes; Gray; Quinn	Report		Stadium: Elm Park

27 February 1993 31	Reading	2–1	Huddersfield Town	Reading
	Gray; Gilkes	Report	Goal	Stadium: Elm Park

6 March 1993 32	Fulham	0–0	Reading	Fulham
		Report		Stadium: Craven Cottage

10 March 1993 33	Reading	1–0	Port Vale	Reading
	Hopkins	Report		Stadium: Elm Park

13 March 1994 34	Blackpool	0–1	Reading	Blackpool
		Report	Quinn	Stadium: Bloomfield Road

20 March 1993 35	Reading	1–0	Burnley	Reading
	Gilkes	Report		Stadium: Elm Park

23 March 1993 36	Exeter City	0–0	Reading	Exeter
		Report		Stadium: St James Park

27 March 1993 37	Reading	3–2	Bournemouth	Reading
	Lovell; Quinn	Report	Goal	Stadium: Elm Park

3 April 1993 38	Port Vale	3–1	Reading	Stoke-on-Trent
	Goal	Report	Quinn	Stadium: Vale Park

7 April 1993 39	Reading	1–0	Chester	Reading
	Parkinson	Report		Stadium: Elm Park

10 April 1993 40	Stoke City	2–0	Reading	Stoke-on-Trent
	Goal	Report		Stadium: Victoria Ground

12 April 1993 41	Reading	3–1	Mansfield Town	Reading
	Lovell; Gooding; Taylor	Report	Goal	Stadium: Elm Park

16 April 1993 42	Stockport County	2–2	Reading	Stockport
	Goal	Report	Quinn (pen.); Lovell	Stadium: Edgeley Park

21 April 1993 43	Reading	1–1	West Bromwich Albion	Reading
	Parkinson	Report	Goal	Stadium: Elm Park

24 April 1993 44	Bradford City	3–0	Reading	Bradford
	Goal	Report		Stadium: Valley Parade

1 May 1993 45	Reading	2–0	Swansea City	Reading
	Quinn (pen.); Lovell	Report		Stadium: Elm Park

8 May 1993 46	Plymouth Argyle	2–2	Reading	Plymouth
	Goal	Report	Lovell; Gilkes	Stadium: Home Park

==== League table ====
Pos	Team	Pld	W	D	L	GF	GA	GD	Pts	Qualification or relegation
6	Stockport County	46	19	15	12	81	57	+24	72	Qualification for the Second Division play-offs
7	Leyton Orient	46	21	9	16	69	53	+16	72	
8	Reading	46	18	15	13	66	51	+15	69	
9	Brighton & Hove Albion	46	20	9	17	63	59	+4	69	
10	Bradford City	46	18	14	14	69	67	+2	68	

Rules for classification: 1) Points; 2) Goals scored; 3) Goal difference

=== FA Cup ===
15 November 1992 First Round	Reading	1–0	Birmingham City	Reading
	Quinn	Report		Stadium: Elm Park

5 December 1992 Second Round	Reading	3–0	Leyton Orient	Reading
	Quinn (pen.); Parkinson	Report		Stadium: Elm Park

2 January 1993 Third Round	Manchester City	1–1	Reading	Manchester
	Goal	Report	Taylor	Stadium: Maine Road

13 January 1993 Third Round Replay	Reading	0–4	Manchester City	Reading
		Report	Goal	Stadium: Elm Park

=== League Cup ===
22 September 1992 Second Round 1st Leg	Watford	2–2	Reading	Watford
	Goal	Report	Quinn; Williams	Stadium: Vicarage Road

7 October 1992 Second Round 2nd Leg	Reading	0–2 (2–4 agg.)	Watford	Reading
		Report	Goal	Stadium: Elm Park

=== Football League Trophy ===
1 December 1992 First Round Group	Reading	1–1	Brighton & Hove Albion	Reading
	Gilkes	Report	Goal	Stadium: Elm Park

5 January 1993 First Round Group	Bournemouth	1–1	Reading	Bournemouth
	Goal	Report	Viveash	Stadium: Dean Court

9 February 1993 Second Round	Exeter City	2–2 (a.e.t.) (4–2 p)	Reading	Exeter
	Quinn	Report	Goal	Stadium: St James Park

== Squad statistics ==
As of match played 8 May 1993

=== Appearances and goals ===
No.	Pos	Nat	Player	Total		Division 2		FA Cup		League Cup		League Trophy	
No.	Pos	Nat	Player	Apps	Goals	Apps	Goals	Apps	Goals	Apps	Goals	Apps	Goals
	GK	(England) ENG	Steve Francis	39	0	34	0	4	0	0	0	1	0
	GK	(England) ENG	Shaka Hislop	16	0	12	0	0	0	2	0	2	0
	DF	(Wales) WAL	Jeff Hopkins	44	1	36	1	4	0	2	0	2	0
	DF	(England) ENG	Darren Jackson	6	0	5	0	0	0	0	0	1	0
	DF	(England) ENG	Darren McCance	1	0	1	0	0	0	0	0	0	0
	DF	(Republic of Ireland) IRL	David McDonald	11	0	11	0	0	0	0	0	0	0
	DF	(England) ENG	Keith McPherson	52	1	44	1	4	0	2	0	2	0
	DF	(England) ENG	Steve Richardson	16	0	11+4	0	0	0	0	0	1	0
	DF	(England) ENG	Adi Viveash	6	1	5	0	0	0	0	0	1	1
	DF	(England) ENG	Ady Williams	40	5	30+1	4	4	0	2	1	3	0
	MF	(England) ENG	David Bass	5	0	5	0	0	0	0	0	0	0
	MF	(England) ENG	Kevin Dillon	47	1	40	1	3	0	2	0	2	0
	MF	(England) ENG	Michael Gilkes	45	13	38	12	4	0	2	0	1	1
	MF	(England) ENG	Mick Gooding	49	3	38+2	3	3+1	0	2	0	3	0
	MF	(England) ENG	Mark Holzman	20	0	12+4	0	2	0	0	0	2	0
	MF	(England) ENG	Tommy Jones	26	1	21	1	2	0	2	0	1	0
	MF	(England) ENG	Jamie Lambert	35	3	9+18	3	4	0	0+1	0	1+2	0
	MF	(England) ENG	Phil Parkinson	47	5	38+1	4	3	1	2	0	2+1	0
	MF	(England) ENG	Scott Taylor	39	6	30+2	5	3	1	1	0	2+1	0
	FW	(England) ENG	Lea Barkus	11	0	4+5	0	0+1	0	0	0	1	0
	FW	(England) ENG	Andy Gray	12	3	8+3	3	0	0	0	0	1	0
	FW	(Australia) AUS	Stuart Lovell	26	8	18+4	8	0+3	0	1	0	0	0
	FW	(Scotland) SCO	Mark McGhee	13	2	9+4	2	0	0	0	0	0	0
	FW	(Northern Ireland) NIR	Jimmy Quinn	51	23	42	17	4	3	2	1	3	2
Players who appeared for Reading but left during the season:
	FW	(England) ENG	Paul Moody	6	1	5	1	0	0	0	0	1	0

=== Goal Scorers ===
Place	Position	Nation	Name	Division 2	FA Cup	League Cup	League Trophy	Total
1	FW	(Northern Ireland)	Jimmy Quinn	17	3	1	2	23
2	MF	(England)	Michael Gilkes	12	0	0	1	13
3	FW	(Australia)	Stuart Lovell	8	0	0	0	8
4	MF	(England)	Scott Taylor	5	1	0	0	6
5	MF	(England)	Phil Parkinson	4	1	0	0	5
5	DF	(England)	Ady Williams	4	0	1	0	5
7	MF	(England)	Mick Gooding	3	0	0	0	3
7	FW	(England)	Andy Gray	3	0	0	0	3
7	MF	(England)	Jamie Lambert	3	0	0	0	3
10	FW	(Scotland)	Mark McGhee	2	0	0	0	2
12	MF	(England)	Kevin Dillon	1	0	0	0	1
12	DF	(Wales)	Jeff Hopkins	1	0	0	0	1
12	MF	(England)	Tommy Jones	1	0	0	0	1
12	DF	(England)	Keith McPherson	1	0	0	0	1
12	FW	(England)	Paul Moody	1	0	0	0	1
12	DF	(England)	Adi Viveash	0	0	0	1	1
			TOTALS	66	5	2	4	77

== Team kit ==
Reading's kit for the 1992–93 was manufactured by Brooks Sports, and the main sponsor was Auto Trader.

1992–93 home colours	1992–93 away colours
