= 1994–95 Reading F.C. season =

Coordinates: 51°27′10″N 1°0′8.7″W

Reading
1994–95 season
- Chairman: John Madejski
- Manager: Mark McGhee (until 14 December); Mick Gooding & Jimmy Quinn (player-managers from 4 January)
- Stadium: Elm Park
- First Division: 2nd (qualified for play-offs)
- Play-offs: Runners-up vs Bolton Wanderers
- FA Cup: Third round vs Oldham Athletic
- League Cup: Second round vs Derby County
- Top goalscorer: League: Stuart Lovell (11); All: Stuart Lovell (14)
Home colours

During the 1994–95 English football season, Reading F.C. competed in the Football League First Division, following promotion from the Second Division the previous season.

== Season summary ==
Mark McGhee left Reading in December to take over at Leicester City. Players Jimmy Quinn, Mick Gooding, Ady Williams and Jeff Hopkins acted as caretakers until January, when Quinn and Gooding were named as full-time player-managers. The inexperienced duo led Reading to second in the First Division. In any other season this would have been enough for promotion to the Premier League, but due to restructuring of the league, only two teams would be awarded promotion, and therefore Reading entered the play-offs.

After beating Tranmere Rovers 3–1 on aggregate (3–1 and 0–0 over two legs) they travelled to Wembley to face Bolton Wanderers. Reading were 2–0 up within 12 minutes and appeared certain to be playing top-flight football for the first time in their history next season, but Bolton fought back to score twice in the last 15 minutes to take the game to extra time. Bolton scored twice more in extra time to lead 4–2. Although player-manager Quinn, on as a second-half substitute, pulled one back in the 119th minute, Bolton held on to win and sealed promotion to the Premier League at Reading's expense. Following the final defeat, it would be eleven years before Reading finally experienced top-flight football.

== Squad ==
As of match played 29 May 1995

| Name | Nationality | Position | Date of birth (Age (Note: Age as of the end of the season)) | Signed from | Signed in | Contract ends | Apps. | Goals |
Goalkeepers
| Shaka Hislop | (England) (Note: Shaka Hislop was born in Hackney, England, and represented England at U-21 level, but also qualified to represent Trinidad and Tobago internationally and would make his international debut for Trinidad and Tobago in 2000.) | GK | 22 February 1969 (aged 26) | Howard Bison | 1992 | | 126 | 0 |
| Simon Sheppard | (England) | GK | 7 August 1973 (aged 21) | Watford | 1994 | | 0 | 0 |
Defenders
| Andy Bernal | (Australia) | DF | 21 February 1973 (aged 22) | Sydney Olympic | 1994 | | 40 | 0 |
| Keith McPherson | (England) | DF | 11 September 1963 (aged 31) | Northampton Town | 1990 | | | |
| Adi Viveash | (England) | DF | 30 September 1969 (aged 25) | loan from Swindon Town | 1994 | 1995 | 12 | 1 |
| Dylan Kerr | (Malta) | DF | 14 January 1967 (aged 28) | Leeds United | 1993 | | 95 | 3 |
| Dariusz Wdowczyk | (Poland) | DF | 25 September 1962 (aged 32) | Celtic | 1994 | | 44 | 0 |
| Jeff Hopkins | (Wales) | DF | 14 April 1964 (aged 31) | Bristol Rovers | 1992 | | 122 | 3 |
| Ady Williams | (Wales) (Note: Ady Williams was born in Reading, England, but also qualified to represent Wales internationally through his father, and would make his international debut for Wales on 23 May 1994.) | DF | 16 September 1971 (aged 23) | Trainee | 1989 | | | |
Midfielders
| David Bass | (England) | MF | 29 November 1974 (aged 20) | Trainee | 1992 | | 9 | 0 |
| Michael Gilkes | (England) (Note: Michael Gilkes was born in Hackney, England, but also qualified to represent Barbados internationally and would make his international debut for Barbados in 2000.) | MF | 20 July 1965 (aged 29) | Leicester City | 1984 | | | |
| Mick Gooding (Player-Manager) | (England) | MF | 12 April 1959 (aged 36) | Wolverhampton Wanderers | 1989 | | | |
| Paul Holsgrove | (England) | MF | 26 August 1969 (aged 25) | Millwall | 1994 | | 29 | 4 |
| Tommy Jones | (England) | MF | 7 October 1964 (aged 30) | Swindon Town | 1992 | | 66 | 2 |
| Jamie Lambert | (England) | MF | 14 September 1973 (aged 21) | Trainee | 1992 | | 54 | 5 |
| Mick Murphy | (England) | MF | 5 May 1977 (aged 18) | Trainee | 1994 | | 1 | 0 |
| Simon Osborn | (England) | MF | 19 January 1972 (aged 23) | Crystal Palace | 1994 | | 39 | 5 |
| Phil Parkinson | (England) | MF | 1 December 1967 (aged 27) | Bury | 1992 | | 133 | 9 |
| Scott Taylor | (England) | MF | 23 November 1970 (aged 24) | Trainee | 1989 | | | |
| Derek Simpson | (Scotland) | MF | 23 December 1978 (aged 16) | Trainee | 1994 | | 0 | 0 |
Forwards
| Stuart Lovell | (Australia) | FW | 9 January 1972 (aged 23) | Trainee | 1990 | | | |
| Lea Barkus | (England) | FW | 7 December 1974 (aged 20) | Trainee | 1991 | | 17 | 0 |
| Alan Carey | (England) | FW | 21 August 1975 (aged 19) | Trainee | 1994 | | 3 | 0 |
| Uwe Hartenberger | (Germany) | FW | 1 February 1968 (aged 27) | KFC Uerdingen 05 | 1993 | | 29 | 5 |
| Jimmy Quinn (Player-Manager) | (Northern Ireland) | FW | 7 December 1959 (aged 35) | Bournemouth | 1992 | | 148 | 73 |
| Lee Nogan | (Wales) | FW | 21 May 1969 (aged 26) | Watford | 1995 | | 23 | 12 |
Out on loan
Left during the season
| Darren Barnard | (England) (Note: Darren Barnard was born in Rinteln, Germany, and represented England at U-18 level, but also qualified to represent Wales internationally and would make his international debut for Wales in 1998.) | DF | 30 November 1971 (aged 23) | loan from Chelsea | 1994 | 1994 | 4 | 0 |

=== Left club during season ===
Note: Flags indicate national team as defined under FIFA eligibility rules; some limited exceptions apply. Players may hold more than one non-FIFA nationality.

| No. | Pos. | Nation | Player |
|---|---|---|---|
| — | DF | ENG | Darren Barnard (loan return to Chelsea) |

== Transfers ==
=== In ===
| Date | Position | Nationality | Name | From | Fee | Ref. |
|---|---|---|---|---|---|---|
| Summer 1994 | GK | (England) | Simon Sheppard | Watford | | |
| Summer 1994 | DF | (Australia) | Andy Bernal | Sydney Olympic | £30,000 | |
| Summer 1994 | DF | (Poland) | Dariusz Wdowczyk | Celtic | | |
| Summer 1994 | MF | (England) | Paul Holsgrove | Millwall | | |
| Summer 1994 | MF | (England) | Simon Osborn | Crystal Palace | £90,000 | |
| 12 January 1995 | FW | (Wales) | Lee Nogan | Watford | £250,000 | |

=== Loans in ===
| Date from | Position | Nationality | Name | From | Date to | Ref. |
|---|---|---|---|---|---|---|
| Summer 1994 | DF | (England) | Darren Barnard | Chelsea | | |
| Summer 1994 | DF | (England) | Adi Viveash | Swindon Town | Summer 1995 | |

=== Released ===
| Date | Position | Nationality | Name | Joined | Date |
|---|---|---|---|---|---|
| 30 June 1995 | FW | (Germany) | Uwe Hartenberger | Waldhof Mannheim | |

== Competitions ==
=== Division two ===
==== Results ====
| 13 August 1994 1 | Wolverhampton Wanderers | 1–0 | Reading | Wolverhampton |
| | Froggatt | Report | | Stadium: Molineux |

| 20 August 1994 2 | Reading | 0–0 | Portsmouth | Reading |
| | | Report | | Stadium: Elm Park |

| 27 August 1994 3 | Barnsley | 0–2 | Reading | Barnsley |
| | | Report | Osborn; Taylor | Stadium: Oakwell |

| 30 August 1994 4 | Reading | 4–0 | Stoke City | Reading |
| | Lovell; Kerr; Gilkes; Taylor | Report | | Stadium: Elm Park |

| 3 September 1994 5 | Reading | 0–0 | Millwall | Reading |
| | | Report | | Stadium: Elm Park |

| 10 September 1994 6 | Oldham Athletic | 1–3 | Reading | Oldham |
| | Richardson | Report | Lovell; Osborn | Stadium: Boundary Park |

| 14 September 1994 7 | Swindon Town | 1–0 | Reading | Swindon |
| | Scott | Report | | Stadium: County Ground |

| 17 September 1994 8 | Reading | 1–0 | Sheffield United | Reading |
| | Quinn | Report | | Stadium: Elm Park |

| 24 September 1994 9 | Watford | 2–2 | Reading | Watford |
| | Johnson; Moralee | Report | Osborn; Lovell | Stadium: Vicarage Road |

| 1 October 1994 10 | Reading | 2–0 | Notts County | Reading |
| | Lovell; Hartenberger | Report | | Stadium: Elm Park |

| 8 October 1994 11 | Charlton Athletic | 1–2 | Reading | Charlton |
| | Robson | Report | Osborn; Gilkes | Stadium: The Valley |

| 15 October 1994 12 | Reading | 1–0 | Bristol City | Reading |
| | Gilkes | Report | | Stadium: Elm Park |

| 22 October 1994 13 | Reading | 0–2 | Sunderland | Reading |
| | | Report | Melville; Gray | Stadium: Elm Park |

| 29 October 1994 14 | West Bromwich Albion | 2–0 | Reading | West Bromwich |
| | Hunt; Ashcroft | Report | | Stadium: The Hawthorns |

| 2 November 1994 15 | Derby County | 1–2 | Reading | Derby |
| | Gabbiadini | Report | Taylor; Gilkes | Stadium: Pride Park |

| 5 November 1994 16 | Reading | 0–0 | Burnley | Reading |
| | | Report | | Stadium: Elm Park |

| 19 November 1994 17 | Southend United | 4–1 | Reading | Southend-on-Sea |
| | Jones; Bressington (pen.); Thomson | Report | Quinn | Stadium: Roots Hall |

| 26 November 1994 18 | Reading | 1–3 | Tranmere Rovers | Reading |
| | Jones | Report | Brannan; Muir | Stadium: Elm Park |

| 3 December 1994 19 | Sunderland | 0–1 | Reading | Sunderland |
| | | Report | Taylor | Stadium: Roker Park |

| 6 December 1994 20 | Reading | 1–1 | Middlesbrough | Reading |
| | Taylor | Report | Wilkinson (pen.) | Stadium: Elm Park |

| 10 December 1994 21 | Portsmouth | 1–1 | Reading | Portsmouth |
| | Creaney | Report | Quinn (pen.) | Stadium: Fratton Park |

| 18 December 1994 22 | Reading | 4–2 | Wolverhampton Wanderers | Reading |
| | Osborn; Quinn; Gilkes | Report | Quinn (o.g.); Bull | Stadium: Elm Park |

| 26 December 1994 23 | Reading | 0–0 | Millwall | Reading |
| | | Report | | Stadium: Elm Park |

| 28 December 1994 24 | Port Vale | 0–2 | Reading | Stoke-on-Trent |
| | | Report | Quinn (pen.); Taylor | Stadium: Vale Park |

| 31 December 1994 25 | Reading | 1–1 | Grimsby Town | Reading |
| | Lambert | Report | Shakespeare | Stadium: Elm Park |

| 2 January 1995 26 | Bolton Wanderers | 1–0 | Reading | Bolton |
| | Coleman | Report | | Stadium: Burnden Park |

| 14 January 1995 27 | Reading | 0–2 | West Bromwich Albion | Reading |
| | | Report | Hunt; Donovan | Stadium: Elm Park |

| 21 January 1995 28 | Burnley | 1–2 | Reading | Burnley |
| | Parkinson | Report | Nogan; Taylor | Stadium: Turf Moor |

| 4 February 1995 29 | Middlesbrough | 0–1 | Reading | Middlesbrough |
| | | Report | Holsgrove | Stadium: Ayresome Park |

| 11 February 1995 30 | Reading | 1–0 | Derby County | Reading |
| | Kavanagh (o.g.) | Report | | Stadium: Elm Park |

| 18 February 1995 31 | Tranmere Rovers | 1–0 | Reading | Birkenhead |
| | Muir | Report | | Stadium: Prenton Park |

| 21 February 1995 32 | Reading | 2–0 | Southend United | Reading |
| | Holsgrove; Nogan | Report | | Stadium: Elm Park |

| 25 February 1995 33 | Notts County | 1–0 | Reading | Nottingham |
| | Agana | Report | | Stadium: Meadow Lane |

| 4 March 1995 34 | Reading | 4–1 | Watford | Reading |
| | Gilkes; Holsgrove; Hartenberger | Report | Phillips | Stadium: Elm Park |

| 8 March 1995 35 | Millwall | 2–0 | Reading | Bermondsey |
| | Oldfield; Williams (?) | Report | | Stadium: The Den |

| 11 March 1995 36 | Reading | 0–3 | Barnsley | Reading |
| | | Report | O'Connell; Taggart; Payton | Stadium: Elm Park |

| 18 March 1995 37 | Stoke City | 0–1 | Reading | Stoke-on-Trent |
| | | Report | Taylor | Stadium: Victoria Ground |

| 21 March 1995 38 | Reading | 2–1 | Oldham Athletic | Reading |
| | Nogan; Lovell | Report | Halle | Stadium: Elm Park |

| 25 March 1995 39 | Sheffield United | 1–1 | Reading | Sheffield |
| | Blake | Report | Nogan | Stadium: Bramall Lane |

| 1 April 1995 40 | Reading | 3–0 | Swindon Town | Reading |
| | Lovell (pen.) | Report | | Stadium: Elm Park |

| 8 April 1995 41 | Grimsby Town | 1–0 | Reading | Cleethorpes |
| | Livingstone | Report | | Stadium: Blundell Park |

| 15 April 1995 42 | Reading | 3–3 | Port Vale | Reading |
| | Nogan | Report | Naylor; Porter; Bogie (pen.) | Stadium: Elm Park |

| 17 April 1995 43 | Luton Town | 0–1 | Reading | Luton |
| | | Report | J.Taylor (o.g.) | Stadium: Kenilworth Road |

| 21 April 1995 44 | Reading | 2–1 | Bolton Wanderers | Reading |
| | Lovell; Nogan | Report | Lee | Stadium: Elm Park |

| 29 April 1995 45 | Bristol City | 1–2 | Reading | Bristol |
| | Tinnion | Report | Lovell; Nogan | Stadium: Ashton Gate |

| 7 May 1995 46 | Reading | 2–1 | Charlton Athletic | Reading |
| | Nogan; Williams | Report | Chandler | Stadium: Elm Park |

==== League table ====
| Pos | Team | Pld | W | D | L | GF | GA | GD | Pts | Qualification or relegation |
|---|---|---|---|---|---|---|---|---|---|---|
| 1 | Middlesbrough (C, P) | 46 | 23 | 13 | 10 | 67 | 40 | +27 | 82 | Promotion to the Premier League |
| 2 | Reading | 46 | 23 | 10 | 13 | 58 | 44 | +14 | 79 | Qualification for the First Division play-offs |
| 3 | Bolton Wanderers (O, P) | 46 | 21 | 14 | 11 | 67 | 45 | +22 | 77 | Qualification for the First Division play-offs |
| 4 | Wolverhampton Wanderers | 46 | 21 | 13 | 12 | 77 | 61 | +16 | 76 | Qualification for the First Division play-offs |
| 5 | Tranmere Rovers | 46 | 22 | 10 | 14 | 67 | 58 | +9 | 76 | Qualification for the First Division play-offs |

Rules for classification: 1) Points; 2) Goals scored; 3) Goal difference
(C) Champions; (O) Play-off winners; (P) Promoted

==== Play-offs ====
| 14 May 1995 First Leg | Tranmere Rovers | 1–3 | Reading | Birkenhead |
| 14:55 BST (UTC+1) | Malkin 14' | | Lovell 9', 81'; Nogan 74' | Stadium: Prenton Park; Attendance: 12,207; Referee: John Kirkby |

| 17 May 1995 Second Leg | Reading | 0–0 (3–1 agg.) | Tranmere Rovers | Reading |
| 19:45 BST (UTC+1) | | | | Stadium: Elm Park; Attendance: 13,245; Referee: Paul Alcock |

===== Final =====
| 29 May 1995 | Bolton Wanderers | 4–3 (a.e.t.) | Reading | London |
| 15:00 BST (UTC+1) | Coyle 75'; De Freitas 86', 118'; Paatelainen 105' | (Report) | Nogan 4'; Williams 12'; Quinn 119' | Stadium: Wembley Stadium; Attendance: 64,107; Referee: Peter Foakes |

| Bolton Wanderers | Reading |

Bolton Wanderers:
| GK | 1 | (England) Keith Branagan |
| DF | 2 | (England) Scott Green |
| DF | 3 | (England) Jimmy Phillips |
| DF | 5 | (Iceland) Guðni Bergsson |
| DF | 6 | (England) Alan Stubbs |
| MF | 7 | (England) Neil McDonald | (substituted off) 46' |
| MF | 4 | (Republic of Ireland) Jason McAteer |
| MF | 10 | (Finland) Mixu Paatelainen |
| MF | 11 | (England) Alan Thompson |
| FW | 8 | (Scotland) Owen Coyle |
| FW | 9 | (Scotland) John McGinlay |
Substitutes:
| GK | 12 | (England) Peter Shilton |
| DF | 14 | (England) John Dreyer |
| FW | 15 | (Suriname) Fabian de Freitas | (substituted on) 46' |
Manager:
(Scotland) Bruce Rioch

Reading:
| GK | 1 | (Trinidad and Tobago) Shaka Hislop |
| RWB | 2 | (Australia) Andy Bernal | (substituted off) 67' |
| DF | 4 | (England) Keith McPherson |
| DF | 6 | (Poland) Dariusz Wdowczyk |
| DF | 5 | (Wales) Ady Williams |
| LWB | 3 | (England) Michael Gilkes |
| MF | 8 | (England) Mick Gooding |
| MF | 7 | (England) Simon Osborn |
| MF | 11 | (England) Scott Taylor |
| FW | 9 | (Wales) Lee Nogan | (substituted off) 62' |
| FW | 10 | (Australia) Stuart Lovell |
Substitutes:
| GK | 15 | (England) Simon Sheppard |
| DF | 14 | (Wales) Jeff Hopkins | (substituted on) 67' |
| FW | 12 | (Northern Ireland) Jimmy Quinn | (substituted on) 62' |
Manager:
(Northern Ireland) Jimmy Quinn & (England) Mick Gooding

MATCH RULES
- 90 minutes.
- 30 minutes of extra-time if necessary.
- Penalty shootout if scores still level.
- 3 named substitutes.
- Maximum of 3 substitutions.

=== FA Cup ===
| 7 January 1995 Third Round | Reading | 1–3 | Oldham Athletic | Reading |
| 15:00 GMT (UTC) | Taylor | Report | Sharp; Halle; Richardson | Stadium: Elm Park |

=== League Cup ===
| 16 August 1994 First Round 1st Leg | Gillingham | 0–1 | Reading | Gillingham |
| 19:30 BST (UTC+1) | | Report | Williams | Stadium: Priestfield Stadium |

| 23 August 1994 First Round 2nd Leg | Reading | 3–0 (4–0 agg.) | Gillingham | Reading |
| 19:45 BST (UTC+1) | Quinn; Lovell | Report | | Stadium: Elm Park |

| 20 September 1994 Second Round 1st Leg | Reading | 3–1 | Derby County | Reading |
| 19:45 BST (UTC+1) | Quinn; Holsgrove | Report | Gabbiadini | Stadium: Elm Park |

| 28 September 1994 Second Round 2nd Leg | Derby County | 2–0 ((a)3–3 agg.) | Reading | Derby |
| 19:45 BST (UTC+1) | Gabbiadini; Williams | Report | | Stadium: Pride Park |

== Squad statistics ==
As of match played 29 May 1995

=== Appearances and goals ===
| No. | Pos | Nat | Player | Total | | Division 1 | | Playoffs | | FA Cup | | League Cup | |
| No. | Pos | Nat | Player | Apps | Goals | Apps | Goals | Apps | Goals | Apps | Goals | Apps | Goals |
|---|---|---|---|---|---|---|---|---|---|---|---|---|---|
| | GK | (England) ENG | Shaka Hislop | 54 | 0 | 46 | 0 | 3 | 0 | 1 | 0 | 4 | 0 |
| | DF | (Australia) AUS | Andy Bernal | 40 | 0 | 33 | 0 | 3 | 0 | 1 | 0 | 3 | 0 |
| | DF | (England) ENG | Keith McPherson | 27 | 0 | 19+4 | 0 | 3 | 0 | 0 | 0 | 0+1 | 0 |
| | DF | (England) ENG | Adi Viveash | 6 | 0 | 6 | 0 | 0 | 0 | 0 | 0 | 0 | 0 |
| | DF | (Malta) MLT | Dylan Kerr | 40 | 1 | 35+1 | 1 | 0 | 0 | 0 | 0 | 4 | 0 |
| | DF | (Poland) POL | Dariusz Wdowczyk | 44 | 0 | 37+1 | 0 | 3 | 0 | 1 | 0 | 2 | 0 |
| | DF | (Wales) WAL | Jeff Hopkins | 28 | 0 | 20+1 | 0 | 0+2 | 0 | 0+1 | 0 | 3+1 | 0 |
| | DF | (Wales) WAL | Ady Williams | 29 | 3 | 20+2 | 1 | 3 | 1 | 0 | 0 | 4 | 1 |
| | MF | (England) ENG | Michael Gilkes | 46 | 8 | 37+3 | 8 | 3 | 0 | 1 | 0 | 2 | 0 |
| | MF | (England) ENG | Mick Gooding | 47 | 0 | 37+2 | 0 | 3 | 0 | 1 | 0 | 4 | 0 |
| | MF | (England) ENG | Paul Holsgrove | 29 | 4 | 23+1 | 3 | 0 | 0 | 1 | 0 | 2+2 | 1 |
| | MF | (England) ENG | Tommy Jones | 21 | 1 | 18+2 | 1 | 0 | 0 | 1 | 0 | 0 | 0 |
| | MF | (England) ENG | Jamie Lambert | 11 | 1 | 3+8 | 1 | 0 | 0 | 0 | 0 | 0 | 0 |
| | MF | (England) ENG | Mick Murphy | 1 | 0 | 0+1 | 0 | 0 | 0 | 0 | 0 | 0 | 0 |
| | MF | (England) ENG | Simon Osborn | 39 | 5 | 31+1 | 5 | 3 | 0 | 0 | 0 | 4 | 0 |
| | MF | (England) ENG | Phil Parkinson | 35 | 0 | 25+6 | 0 | 0 | 0 | 1 | 0 | 3 | 0 |
| | MF | (England) ENG | Scott Taylor | 51 | 9 | 31+13 | 8 | 3 | 0 | 1 | 1 | 1+2 | 0 |
| | FW | (Australia) AUS | Stuart Lovell | 38 | 14 | 25+5 | 11 | 3 | 2 | 1 | 0 | 4 | 1 |
| | FW | (England) ENG | Alan Carey | 2 | 0 | 0+2 | 0 | 0 | 0 | 0 | 0 | 0 | 0 |
| | FW | (Germany) GER | Uwe Hartenberger | 16 | 2 | 8+7 | 2 | 0 | 0 | 0+1 | 0 | 0 | 0 |
| | FW | (Northern Ireland) NIR | Jimmy Quinn | 42 | 10 | 31+4 | 5 | 0+2 | 1 | 1 | 0 | 4 | 4 |
| | FW | (Wales) WAL | Lee Nogan | 23 | 12 | 18+2 | 10 | 3 | 2 | 0 | 0 | 0 | 0 |
Players who appeared for Reading but left during the season:
| | DF | (England) ENG | Darren Barnard | 4 | 0 | 3+1 | 0 | 0 | 0 | 0 | 0 | 0 | 0 |

=== Goal Scorers ===
| Place | Position | Nation | Name | First Division | Playoffs | FA Cup | League Cup | Total |
|---|---|---|---|---|---|---|---|---|
| 1 | FW | (Australia) | Stuart Lovell | 11 | 2 | 0 | 1 | 14 |
| 2 | FW | (Wales) | Lee Nogan | 10 | 2 | 0 | 0 | 12 |
| 3 | FW | (Northern Ireland) | Jimmy Quinn | 5 | 1 | 0 | 4 | 10 |
| 4 | MF | (England) | Scott Taylor | 8 | 0 | 1 | 0 | 9 |
| 5 | MF | (England) | Michael Gilkes | 8 | 0 | 0 | 0 | 8 |
| 6 | MF | (England) | Simon Osborn | 5 | 0 | 0 | 0 | 5 |
| 7 | MF | (England) | Paul Holsgrove | 3 | 0 | 0 | 1 | 4 |
| 8 | DF | (Wales) | Ady Williams | 1 | 1 | 0 | 1 | 3 |
| 9 | FW | (Germany) | Uwe Hartenberger | 2 | 0 | 0 | 0 | 2 |
| 9 | | | Own goal | 2 | 0 | 0 | 0 | 2 |
| 11 | MF | (England) | Tom Jones | 1 | 0 | 0 | 0 | 1 |
| 11 | MF | (England) | Jamie Lambert | 1 | 0 | 0 | 0 | 1 |
| 11 | DF | (Malta) | Dylan Kerr | 1 | 0 | 0 | 0 | 1 |
| | | | TOTALS | 58 | 6 | 1 | 7 | 72 |

== Team kit ==
Reading's kit for the 1994–95 was manufactured by Pelada, and the main sponsor was Auto Trader.

| 1994–95 home colours | 1994–95 away colours |
