= 1993–94 Reading F.C. season =

Reading
1993–94 season
- Chairman: John Madejski
- Manager: Mark McGhee
- Stadium: Elm Park
- Second Division: 1st
- FA Cup: First round
- League Cup: Second round
- League Trophy: Third round
- Top goalscorer: League: Jimmy Quinn 35; All: Jimmy Quinn 37
Home colours

During the 1993–94 English football season, Reading F.C. competed in the Football League Second Division.

== Squad ==
As of match played 5 May 1994

Name	Nationality	Position	Date of birth (Age (Note: Age as of the end of the season))	Signed from	Signed in	Contract ends	Apps.	Goals
Goalkeepers
Shaka Hislop	(England) (Note: Shaka Hislop was born in Hackney, England, and represented England at U-21 level, but also qualified to represent Trinidad and Tobago internationally and would make his international debut for Trinidad and Tobago in 2000.)	GK	22 February 1969 (aged 25)	Howard Bison	1992		72	0
Defenders
Mark Holzman	(England)	DF	21 February 1973 (aged 21)	Trainee	1991		43	1
Darren McCance	(England)	DF	13 September 1973 (aged 20)	Trainee	1992		2	0
Keith McPherson	(England)	DF	11 September 1963 (aged 30)	Northampton Town	1990			
Ray Ranson	(England)	DF	12 June 1960 (aged 33)	Manchester City	1993		30	0
Ray Wallace	(England)	DF	2 October 1969 (aged 24)	loan from Leeds United	1994		3	0
Ady Williams	(England) (Note: Ady Williams was born in Reading, England, but also qualified to represent Wales internationally through his father, and would make his international debut for Wales on 23 May 1994.)	DF	16 September 1971 (aged 22)	Trainee	1989			
Tony Witter	(England)	DF	12 August 1965 (aged 28)	loan from Queens Park Rangers	1994		4	0
Dylan Kerr	(Malta)	DF	14 January 1967 (aged 27)	Leeds United	1993		55	2
Jeff Hopkins	(Wales)	DF	14 April 1964 (aged 30)	Bristol Rovers	1992		94	3
Midfielders
David Bass	(England)	MF	29 November 1974 (aged 19)	Trainee	1992		9	0
Kevin Dillon	(England)	MF	18 December 1959 (aged 34)	Newcastle United	1991		119	5
Michael Gilkes	(England) (Note: Michael Gilkes was born in Hackney, England, but also qualified to represent Barbados internationally and would make his international debut for Barbados in 2000.)	MF	20 July 1965 (aged 28)	Leicester City	1984			
Mick Gooding	(England)	MF	12 April 1959 (aged 35)	Wolverhampton Wanderers	1989			
Tommy Jones	(England)	MF	7 October 1964 (aged 29)	Swindon Town	1992		45	1
Jamie Lambert	(England)	MF	14 September 1973 (aged 20)	Trainee	1992		43	4
Phil Parkinson	(England)	MF	1 December 1967 (aged 26)	Bury	1992		98	9
Scott Taylor	(England)	MF	23 November 1970 (aged 23)	Trainee	1989			
Forwards
Stuart Lovell	(Australia)	FW	9 January 1972 (aged 22)	Trainee	1990			
Lea Barkus	(England)	FW	7 December 1974 (aged 19)	Trainee	1991		17	0
Alan Carey	(England)	FW	21 August 1975 (aged 18)	Trainee	1994		1	0
Andy Gray	(England)	FW	25 October 1973 (aged 20)	Trainee	1991		20	4
Uwe Hartenberger	(Germany)	FW	1 February 1968 (aged 26)	KFC Uerdingen 05	1993		13	3
Jimmy Quinn	(Northern Ireland)	FW	7 December 1959 (aged 34)	Bournemouth	1992		106	63
Out on loan
Left during the season
John Humphrey	(England)	DF	31 January 1961 (aged 33)	loan from Crystal Palace	1993		9	0

=== Left club during season ===
Note: Flags indicate national team as defined under FIFA eligibility rules; some limited exceptions apply. Players may hold more than one non-FIFA nationality.

No.	Pos.	Nation	Player
—	DF	ENG	John Humphrey (loan return to Crystal Palace)

== Transfers ==
=== In ===
Date	Position	Nationality	Name	From	Fee	Ref.
Summer 1993	DF	(England)	Ray Ranson	Manchester City		
Summer 1993	DF	(Malta)	Dylan Kerr	Leeds United		
Summer 1993	FW	(Germany)	Uwe Hartenberger	KFC Uerdingen 05	£100,000	

=== Loans in ===
Date from	Position	Nationality	Name	From	Date to	Ref.
9 December 1993	DF	(England)	John Humphrey	Crystal Palace	9 February 1994	
11 February 1994	DF	(England)	Tony Witter	Millwall	End of Season	
11 March 1994	DF	(England)	Ray Wallace	Leeds United	End of Season	

=== Out ===
Date	Position	Nationality	Name	To	Fee	Ref.
1 July 1993	GK	(England)	Steve Francis	Huddersfield Town		

=== Released ===
Date	Position	Nationality	Name	Joined	Date	Ref.
30 June 1994	DF	(England)	Mark Holzman			
30 June 1994	DF	(England)	Darren McCance			
30 June 1994	DF	(England)	Ray Ranson	Retired		
30 June 1994	MF	(England)	Kevin Dillon	Stevenage		
30 June 1994	FW	(England)	Andy Gray	Leyton Orient	20 July 1994	

== Competitions ==
=== Division two ===
==== Results ====
14 August 1993 1	Huddersfield Town	0–3	Reading	Huddersfield
			Gooding; Quinn; Lovell	Stadium: Leeds Road

21 August 1993 2	Reading	2–1	Burnley	Reading
	Quinn; McPherson		Eyres (?)	Stadium: Elm Park

28 August 1993 3	Brentford	1–0	Reading	London
	Allon			Stadium: Griffin Park

1 September 1993 4	Reading	4–1	Barnet	Reading
	Parkinson; Gooding; Quinn; Gilkes		Haag	Stadium: Elm Park

4 September 1993 5	Reading	3–1	Cambridge United	Reading
	Quinn (?); Parkinson		Claridge	Stadium: Elm Park

11 September 1993 6	Wrexham	3–2	Reading	Wrexham
	Bennett; Phillips; Lake		Lovell; Jones (?)	Stadium: Racecourse Ground

15 September 1993 7	Bradford City	2–4	Reading	Bradford
	McCarthy (?)		Parkinson; Quinn (?); Lovell	Stadium: Valley Parade

18 September 1993 8	Reading	3–2	Plymouth Argyle	Reading
	Quinn (?); Gooding		Castle (?); Nugent	Stadium: Elm Park

25 September 1993 9	Reading	1–1	Hull City	Reading
	Hopkins		Brown	Stadium: Elm Park

1 October 1993 10	Swansea City	1–1	Reading	Swansea
	McFarlane		Hartenberger	Stadium: Vetch Field

9 October 1993 11	Exeter City	4–6	Reading	Exeter
	Jepson (?); Ross (?)		Quinn (?); Taylor (?); Lovell (?)	Stadium: St James Park

16 October 1993 12	Reading	2–1	Leyton Orient	Reading
	Quinn (?)		West	Stadium: Elm Park

23 October 1993 13	Port Vale	0–4	Reading	Stoke-on-Trent
			Lovell; Taylor; Quinn (?)	Stadium: Vale Park

30 October 1993 14	Reading	1–0	Fulham	Reading
	Quinn			Stadium: Elm Park

2 November 1993 15	Rotherham United	2–2	Reading	Rotherham
	Hazel; Whitworth		Lovell (?)	Stadium: Millmoor

6 November 1993 16	Reading	1–1	Blackpool	Reading
	Quinn		Griffiths	Stadium: Elm Park

20 November 1993 17	Brighton & Hove Albion	0–1	Reading	Hove
			Taylor	Stadium: Goldstone Ground

27 November 1993 18	Reading	3–0	Bournemouth	Reading
	Quinn (?); Gooding			Stadium: Elm Park

11 December 1993 19	Burnley	0–1	Reading	Burnley
			Gooding	Stadium: Turf Moor

18 December 1993 20	Reading	0–0	Huddersfield Town	Reading
				Stadium: Elm Park

28 December 1993 21	Reading	2–0	Stockport County	Reading
	Lovell (?)			Stadium: Elm Park

1 January 1994 22	Cardiff City	3–0	Reading	Cardiff
	Griffith; Aizlewood; Richardson			Stadium: Ninian Park

3 January 1994 23	Reading	2–1	York City	Reading
	Quinn (?)		Hopkins (o.g.)	Stadium: Elm Park

8 January 1994 24	Reading	4–0	Hartlepool United	Reading
	Quinn; Lovell; Taylor; Gooding			Stadium: Elm Park

15 January 1994 25	Leyton Orient	1–1	Reading	London
	West		Lovell	Stadium: Brisbane Road

22 January 1994 26	Reading	1–0	Exeter City	Reading
	Hartenberger			Stadium: Elm Park

25 January 1994 27	Bristol Rovers	1–1	Reading	Bath
	Clark		Quinn	Stadium: Twerton Park

30 January 1994 28	Fulham	1–0	Reading	London
	Hails			Stadium: Craven Cottage

5 February 1994 29	Reading	1–2	Port Vale	Reading
	Quinn (?)		Kent; Foyle	Stadium: Elm Park

12 February 1994 30	Hartlepool United	1–4	Reading	Hartlepool
	McGuckin		Taylor; Lovell (?); Quinn	Stadium: Victoria Park

19 February 1994 31	Reading	2–1	Brentford	Reading
	Hopkins; Quinn		Thompson	Stadium: Elm Park

26 February 1994 32	Cambridge United	0–1	Reading	Cambridge
			Quinn	Stadium: Abbey Stadium

5 March 1994 33	Reading	0–1	Wrexham	Reading
			Hunter	Stadium: Elm Park

12 March 1994 34	Plymouth Argyle	3–1	Reading	Plymouth
	Nugent (?); Dalton		Kerr	Stadium: Home Park

15 March 1994 35	Reading	1–1	Bradford City	Reading
	Lovell		Power	Stadium: Elm Park

19 March 1994 36	Hull City	1–2	Reading	Hull
	Windass (?)		Quinn (?)	Stadium: Boothferry Park

26 March 1994 37	Reading	2–1	Swansea City	Reading
	Quinn; Lovell		Bowen	Stadium: Elm Park

29 March 1994 38	York City	1–0	Reading	York
	Swann			Stadium: Bootham Crescent

2 April 1994 39	Reading	2–0	Bristol Rovers	Reading
	Quinn; Lovell			Stadium: Elm Park

9 April 1994 40	Reading	1–1	Cardiff City	Reading
	Gilkes		Hopkins (?)	Stadium: Elm Park

12 April 1994 41	Barnet	0–1	Reading	London
			Lovell	Stadium: Underhill Stadium

16 April 1994 42	Reading	0–0	Rotherham United	Reading
				Stadium: Elm Park

23 April 1994 43	Blackpool	0–4	Reading	Blackpool
			Kerr; Lovell (?); Quinn	Stadium: Bloomfield Road

28 April 1994 44	Stockport County	1–1	Reading	Stockport
	Francis		Gooding	Stadium: Edgeley Park

30 April 1994 45	Reading	2–0	Brighton & Hove Albion	Reading
	Quinn (?)			Stadium: Elm Park

5 May 1994 46	Bournemouth	2–1	Reading	Bournemouth
	Cotterill; Fletcher		Quinn	Stadium: Dean Court

==== League table ====
Pos	Team	Pld	W	D	L	GF	GA	GD	Pts	Promotion or relegation
1	Reading (C, P)	46	26	11	9	81	44	+37	89	Promotion to the First Division
2	Port Vale (P)	46	26	10	10	79	46	+33	88	Promotion to the First Division
3	Plymouth Argyle	46	25	10	11	88	56	+32	85	Qualification for the Second Division play-offs
4	Stockport County	46	24	13	9	74	44	+30	85	Qualification for the Second Division play-offs
5	York City	46	21	12	13	64	40	+24	75	Qualification for the Second Division play-offs

(C) Champions; (P) Promoted

=== FA Cup ===
13 November 1993 First Round	Cambridge United	0–0	Reading	Cambridge
				Stadium: Abbey Stadium

24 November 1993 First Round Replay	Reading	1–2	Cambridge United	Reading
	Gooding		Nyamah; Heathcote	Stadium: Elm Park

=== League Cup ===
18 August 1993 First Round 1st Leg	Reading	3–0	Northampton Town	Reading
	Quinn; Lovell; Parkinson	Report		Stadium: Elm Park

7 September 1993 First Round 2nd Leg	Northampton Town	0–2 (0–5 agg.)	Reading	Northampton
		Report	Gray; Dillon	Stadium: County Ground

22 September 1993 Second Round 1st Leg	Manchester City	1–1	Reading	Manchester
	White	Report	Lovell	Stadium: Maine Road

6 October 1993 Second Round 2nd Leg	Reading	1–2 (2–3 agg.)	Manchester City	Reading
	J.Quinn	Report	Lomas; N.Quinn	Stadium: Elm Park

=== Football League Trophy ===
20 October 1993 First Round Group	Brighton & Hove Albion	2–2	Reading	Hove
	Goal	Report	Quinn	Stadium: Goldstone Ground

10 November 1993 First Round Group	Reading	1–0	Fulham	Reading
	Taylor	Report		Stadium: Elm Park

1 December 1993 Second Round	Reading	4–1	Northampton Town	Reading
	Hartenberger; Quinn; Lambert; Gooding	Report	Goal	Stadium: Elm Park

11 January 1994 Third Round	Fulham	1–0	Reading	Fulham
	Goal	Report		Stadium: Craven Cottage

== Squad statistics ==
As of match played 5 May 1994

=== Appearances and goals ===
No.	Pos	Nat	Player	Total		Division 2		FA Cup		League Cup		League Trophy	
No.	Pos	Nat	Player	Apps	Goals	Apps	Goals	Apps	Goals	Apps	Goals	Apps	Goals
	GK	(England) ENG	Shaka Hislop	56	0	46	0	2	0	4	0	4	0
	DF	(England) ENG	Mark Holzman	1	0	0	0	0	0	0	0	1	0
	DF	(England) ENG	Darren McCance	1	0	0	0	0	0	0	0	1	0
	DF	(England) ENG	Keith McPherson	27	1	19+1	1	0+1	0	4	0	1+1	0
	DF	(England) ENG	Ray Ranson	30	0	22+2	0	2	0	3	0	1	0
	DF	(England) ENG	Ray Wallace	3	0	3	0	0	0	0	0	0	0
	DF	(England) ENG	Ady Williams	51	0	41	0	2	0	4	0	4	0
	DF	(England) ENG	Tony Witter	4	0	4	0	0	0	0	0	0	0
	DF	(Malta) MLT	Dylan Kerr	55	2	45	2	2	0	4	0	3+1	0
	DF	(Wales) WAL	Jeff Hopkins	50	2	40+2	2	2	0	2	0	4	0
	MF	(England) ENG	Kevin Dillon	39	1	31+1	0	0	0	4	1	3	0
	MF	(England) ENG	Michael Gilkes	48	2	29+10	2	2	0	3+1	0	3	0
	MF	(England) ENG	Mick Gooding	49	9	41	7	2	1	3	0	3	1
	MF	(England) ENG	Tommy Jones	19	0	11+6	0	0	0	2	0	0	0
	MF	(England) ENG	Jamie Lambert	8	1	1+5	0	0	0	0	0	1+1	1
	MF	(England) ENG	Phil Parkinson	51	4	42	3	2	0	4	1	2+1	0
	MF	(England) ENG	Scott Taylor	47	7	34+4	6	2	0	0+3	0	4	1
	FW	(Australia) AUS	Stuart Lovell	54	22	43+2	20	2	0	4	2	2+1	0
	FW	(England) ENG	David Bass	1	0	0+1	0	0	0	0	0	0	0
	FW	(England) ENG	Alan Carey	1	0	0	0	0	0	0	0	0+1	0
	FW	(England) ENG	Andy Gray	7	1	0+5	0	0	0	0+1	1	0+1	0
	FW	(Germany) GER	Uwe Hartenberger	13	3	0+9	2	0+1	0	0	0	3	1
	FW	(Northern Ireland) NIR	Jimmy Quinn	55	40	46	35	2	0	3	2	3+1	3
Players away on loan:
Players who appeared for Reading but left during the season:
	DF	(England) ENG	John Humphrey	9	0	8	0	0	0	0	0	1	0

=== Goal Scorers ===
Place	Position	Nation	Name	First Division	FA Cup	League Cup	Total
1	FW	(Northern Ireland)	Jimmy Quinn	35	0	2	37
2	FW	(Australia)	Stuart Lovell	20	0	2	22
3	MF	(England)	Mick Gooding	7	1	0	8
4	MF	(England)	Scott Taylor	6	0	0	6
5	MF	(England)	Phil Parkinson	3	0	1	4
6	MF	(England)	Michael Gilkes	2	0	0	2
6	FW	(Germany)	Uwe Hartenberger	2	0	0	2
6	DF	(Wales)	Jeff Hopkins	2	0	0	2
6	DF	(Malta)	Dylan Kerr	2	0	0	2
10	DF	(England)	Keith McPherson	1	0	0	1
10			Own goal	1	0	0	1
10	MF	(England)	Kevin Dillon	0	0	1	1
10	FW	(England)	Andy Gray	0	0	1	1
			TOTALS	81	1	7	89

== Team kit ==
Reading's kit for the 1993–94 was manufactured by Pelada, and the main sponsor was Auto Trader.

1993–94 home colours	1993–94 away colours
