= 1991–92 Reading F.C. season =

Reading
1991–92 season
- Chairman: John Madejski
- Player-manager: Mark McGhee
- Stadium: Elm Park
- Third Division: 12th
- FA Cup: Third round
- League Cup: First round
- League Trophy: Preliminary round
- Top goalscorer: Craig Maskell (16)
Home colours

During the 1991–92 English football season, Reading F.C. competed in the Football League Third Division, FA Cup, League Cup and League Trophy. It was their first season with Mark McGhee as their player-manager and they finished in 12th place in the league. They also reached Round 3 of the FA Cup, Round 1 of the League Cup and the Southern Primarily Group of the League Trophy.

== Squad ==
As of match played 2 May 1992

Name	Nationality	Position	Date of birth (Age (Note: Age as of the end of the season))	Signed from	Signed in	Contract ends	Apps.	Goals
Goalkeepers
Steve Francis	(England)	GK	29 May 1964 (aged 27)	Chelsea	1987			
Danny Honey	(England)	GK		Trainee	1989			
Defenders
Nathan Fealey	(England)	DF		Trainee	1991		1	0
Mark Holzman	(England)	DF	21 February 1973 (aged 19)	Trainee	1991		22	1
Keith McPherson	(England)	DF	11 September 1963 (aged 28)	Northampton Town	1990			
Steve Richardson	(England)	DF	11 February 1962 (aged 30)	Southampton	1982			
Floyd Streete	(Jamaica)	DF	5 May 1959 (aged 32)	Wolverhampton Wanderers	1990			
Linden Jones	(Wales)	DF	5 March 1961 (aged 31)	Newport County	1987			
Ady Williams	(England) (Note: Ady Williams was born in Reading, England, but also qualified to represent Wales internationally through his father, and would make his international debut for Wales on 23 May 1994.)	DF	16 August 1971 (aged 20)	Trainee	1989			
Midfielders
Danny Bailey	(England)	MF	21 May 1964 (aged 27)	Exeter City	1989			
David Bass	(England)	MF	29 November 1974 (aged 17)	Trainee	1991		3	0
Kevin Dillon	(England)	MF	18 December 1959 (aged 32)	Newcastle United	1991		33	3
Aaron Giamettei	(England)	MF	11 October 1973 (aged 18)	Trainee	1992		2	0
Michael Gilkes	(England) (Note: Michael Gilkes was born in Hackney, England, but also qualified to represent Barbados internationally and would make his international debut for Barbados in 2000.)	MF	20 July 1965 (aged 26)	Leicester City	1984			
Mick Gooding	(England)	MF	12 April 1959 (aged 33)	Wolverhampton Wanderers	1989			
Chris Seymour	(England)	MF	14 September 1971 (aged 20)	Trainee	1991			
Scott Taylor	(England)	MF	23 November 1970 (aged 21)	Trainee	1989			
Forwards
Stuart Lovell	(Australia)	FW	9 January 1972 (aged 20)	Trainee	1990			
Lea Barkus	(England)	FW	7 December 1974 (aged 17)	Trainee	1991		6	0
Andy Gray	(England)	FW	25 October 1973 (aged 18)	Trainee	1991		1	0
Craig Maskell	(England)	FW	10 April 1968 (aged 24)	Huddersfield Town	1990			
David Robinson	(England)	FW	27 November 1969 (aged 22)	Newcastle United	1992		8	0
Trevor Senior	(England)	FW	28 November 1961 (aged 30)	Middlesbrough	1988			
Gerry Britton	(Scotland)	FW	20 October 1970 (aged 21)	loan from Celtic	1991	1992	4	0
Mark McGhee (Player-Manager)	(Scotland)	FW	25 May 1957 (aged 34)	IK Brage	1991		37	5
Out on loan
Left during the season
John Keeley	(England)	GK	27 July 1961 (aged 30)	loan from Oldham Athletic	1992	1992	6	0
Jim Leighton	(Scotland)	GK	24 July 1958 (aged 33)	loan from Manchester United	1991	1992	11	0
David Lee	(England)	DF	26 November 1969 (aged 22)	loan from Chelsea	1992	1992	5	0
Steve Morrow	(Northern Ireland)	DF	2 July 1970 (aged 21)	loan from Arsenal	1991			
David Byrne	(England)	MF	5 March 1961 (aged 31)	loan from Watford	1991	1991	7	2
Allan Cockram	(England)	MF	8 October 1963 (aged 28)	Woking	1991			
Neale Cooper	(Scotland) (Note: Neale Cooper was born in Darjeeling, India, but also qualified to represent Scotland internationally and would make his debut for Scotland U21 in 1981.)	MF	24 November 1963 (aged 28)	Aberdeen	1991		9	0
Dave Leworthy	(England)	FW	22 October 1962 (aged 29)	Oxford United	1989			
Steve Archibald	(Scotland)	FW	27 September 1956 (aged 35)	Clyde	1992		1	0

=== Left club during season ===
Note: Flags indicate national team as defined under FIFA eligibility rules; some limited exceptions apply. Players may hold more than one non-FIFA nationality.

Pos.	Nation	Player
GK	ENG	John Keeley (loan return to Oldham Athletic)
GK	SCO	Jim Leighton (loan return to Manchester United)
DF	ENG	David Lee (loan return to Chelsea)
DF	ENG	Steve Morrow (loan return to Arsenal)
MF	ENG	David Byrne (loan return to Watford)

Pos.	Nation	Player
MF	ENG	Allan Cockram (to Farnborough Town)
MF	SCO	Neale Cooper (to Dunfermline Athletic)
FW	ENG	Dave Leworthy (to Farnborough Town)
FW	SCO	Steve Archibald (to Fulham)

== Transfers ==
=== In ===
Date	Position	Nationality	Name	From	Fee	Ref.
Summer 1991	MF	(England)	Allan Cockram	Woking		
Summer 1991	MF	(England)	Kevin Dillon	Newcastle United	Free	
10 May 1991	FW	(Scotland)	Mark McGhee	IK Brage		
1 July 1991	MF	(Scotland)	Neale Cooper	Aberdeen		
26 March 1992	FW	(England)	David Robinson	Newcastle United	Free	
Winter 1992	FW	(Scotland)	Steve Archibald	Clyde		

=== Loans in ===
Date from	Position	Nationality	Name	From	Date to	Ref.
Summer 1991	MF	(England)	David Byrne	Watford	Winter 1992	
29 November 1991	GK	(Scotland)	Jim Leighton	Manchester United	6 February 1992	
30 October 1991	DF	(Northern Ireland)	Steve Morrow	Arsenal	3 March 1992	
30 January 1992	DF	(England)	David Lee	Swindon Town	25 March 1992	
6 February 1992	GK	(England)	John Keeley	Oldham Athletic	4 March 1992	
Winter 1992	FW	(Scotland)	Gerry Britton	Celtic	Summer 1992	

=== Out ===
Date	Position	Nationality	Name	To	Fee	Ref.
Summer 1991	DF	(England)	Martin Hicks	Birmingham City		
29 November 1991	MF	(Scotland)	Neale Cooper	Dunfermline Athletic		
Winter 1992	FW	(England)	Dave Leworthy	Farnborough Town		
Winter 1992	FW	(Scotland)	Steve Archibald	Fulham		

=== Released ===
Date	Position	Nationality	Name	Joined	Date
Summer 1991	FW	(England)	George Friel		
Winter 1992	MF	(England)	Allan Cockram	Farnborough Town	
30 June 1992	GK	(England)	Danny Honey		
30 June 1992	DF	(England)	Nathan Fealey		
30 June 1992	DF	(Jamaica)	Floyd Streete	Leighton Town	
30 June 1992	MF	(England)	Aaron Giamettei		
30 June 1992	MF	(England)	Chris Seymour		

== Competitions ==
=== Division Three ===
==== Results ====
17 August 1991 1	Reading	0–1	Hull City	Reading
				Stadium: Elm Park

24 August 1991 2	Hartlepool United	0–2	Reading	Hartlepool
				Stadium: Victoria Park

31 August 1991 3	Reading	3–2	Bury	Reading
	Senior; McPherson; McGhee			Stadium: Elm Park

3 September 1991 4	Swansea City	1–2	Reading	Swansea
			D.Byrne; Senior	Stadium: Vetch Field

7 September 1991 5	Reading	1–1	Birmingham City	Reading
	D.Byrne			Stadium: Elm Park

14 September 191 6	Brentford	1–0	Reading	Brentford
				Stadium: Griffin Park

17 September 1991 7	Torquay United	1–2	Reading	Torquay
			Senior; M.Holzman	Stadium: Plainmoor

21 September 1991 8	Reading	1–2	Bradford City	Reading
	Gooding			Stadium: Elm Park

28 September 1991 9	Exeter City	2–1	Reading	Exeter
			Lovell	Stadium: St James Park

5 October 1991 10	Reading	0–0	Bournemouth	Reading
				Stadium: Elm Park

11 October 1991 11	Wigan Athletic	1–1	Reading	Wigan
			Cockram	Stadium: Springfield Park

19 October 1991 12	Reading	1–1	Peterborough United	Reading
	Dillon .' (pen.)			Stadium: Elm Park

26 October 1991 13	Shrewsbury Town	1–2	Reading	Shrewsbury
			Dillon; Taylor	Stadium: Gay Meadow

2 November 1991 14	Bolton Wanderers	1–1	Reading	Bolton
			Gooding	Stadium: Burnden Park

5 November 1991 15	Reading	2–2	Darlington	Reading
	Maskell; Williams			Stadium: Elm Park

9 November 1991 16	Reading	1–2	West Bromwich Albion	Reading
	Taylor			Stadium: Elm Park

23 November 1991 17	Chester City	2–2	Reading	Macclesfield
			Maskell .' (pen.)	Stadium: Moss Rose
Note: Chester City ground shared with Macclesfield Town at Moss Rose, after leaving The Stadium.

30 November 1991 18	Reading	1–1	Stockport County	Reading
	Maskell			Stadium: Elm Park

20 December 1991 19	Reading	0–1	Hartlepool United	Reading
				Stadium: Elm Park

26 December 1991 20	Bury	0–1	Reading	Bury
			Maskell	Stadium: Gigg Lane

28 December 1991 21	Hull City	0–1	Reading	Hull
			Senior	Stadium: Boothferry Park

1 January 1992 22	Reading	1–0	Swansea City	Reading
	Senior			Stadium: Elm Park

11 January 1992 23	Reading	1–0	Huddersfield Town	Reading
	Senior			Stadium: Elm Park

18 January 1992 24	Stoke City	3–0	Reading	Stoke-on-Trent
				Stadium: Victoria Ground

1 February 1992 25	Peterborough United	5–3	Reading	Peterborough
			Richardson; D.Lee; Maskell .' (pen.)	Stadium: London Road Stadium

8 February 1992 26	Reading	2–1	Shrewsbury Town	Reading
	D.Lee; Senior			Stadium: Elm Park

11 February 1992 27	Stockport County	1–0	Reading	Stockport
				Stadium: Edgeley Park

15 February 1992 28	Reading	0–2	Fulham	Reading
				Stadium: Elm Park

22 February 1992 29	Huddersfield Town	1–2	Reading	Huddersfield
			D.Lee; Williams	Stadium: Leeds Road

29 February 1992 30	Reading	2–2	Preston North End	Reading
	D.Lee			Stadium: Elm Park

4 March 1992 31	Reading	3–4	Stoke City	Reading
	Lovell; Williams; Gooding			Stadium: Elm Park

7 March 1992 32	Leyton Orient	1–1	Reading	Leyton
			Maskell	Stadium: Brisbane Road

10 March 1992 33	Darlington	2–4	Reading	Darlington
			Maskell; Cork .' (o.g.)	Stadium: Feethams

14 March 1992 34	Reading	1–0	Bolton Wanderers	Reading
	Brown .' (o.g.)			Stadium: Elm Park

21 March 1992 35	West Bromwich Albion	2–0	Reading	West Bromwich
				Stadium: The Hawthorns

28 March 1992 36	Reading	0–0	Chester City	Reading
				Stadium: Elm Park

1 April 1992 37	Reading	0–0	Brentford	Reading
				Stadium: Elm Park

4 April 1992 38	Birmingham City	2–0	Reading	Birmingham
				Stadium: St Andrew's

7 April 1992 39	Fulham	1–0	Reading	Fulham
				Stadium: Craven Cottage

11 April 1992 40	Reading	6–1	Torquay United	Reading
	Dillon; Lovell; Barkus; McGhee; Maskell			Stadium: Elm Park

14 April 1992 41	Preston North End	1–1	Reading	Preston
			Maskell	Stadium: Deepdale

18 April 1992 42	Bradford City	1–0	Reading	Bradford
				Stadium: Valley Parade

20 April 1992 43	Reading	1–0	Exeter City	Reading
	McGhee			Stadium: Elm Park

25 April 1992 44	Bournemouth	3–2	Reading	Bournemouth
			Watson .' (o.g.); Williams	Stadium: Dean Court

29 April 1992 45	Reading	3–2	Leyton Orient	Reading
	Maskell; McGhee			Stadium: Elm Park

2 May 1992 46	Reading	3–2	Wigan Athletic	Reading
	Maskell; McGhee; Lovell			Stadium: Elm Park

==== League table ====
Pos	Team	Pld	W	D	L	GF	GA	GD	Pts	Promotion or relegation
10	Leyton Orient	46	18	11	17	62	52	+10	65	Qualification for the Second Division (Note: From the 1992–93 season, the second tier - then known as the Second Division - was renamed to the First Division, the third tier - then known as the Third Division - was renamed to the Second Division, and the fourth tier - then known as the Fourth Division - was renamed to the Third Division.)
11	Hartlepool United	46	18	11	17	57	57	0	65	Qualification for the Second Division
12	Reading	46	16	13	17	59	62	−3	61	Qualification for the Second Division
13	Bolton Wanderers	46	14	17	15	57	56	+1	59	Qualification for the Second Division
14	Hull City	46	16	11	19	54	54	0	59	Qualification for the Second Division

=== FA Cup ===
16 November 1991 1st Round	Slough Town	3–3	Reading	Slough
	Goal		Williams; Gooding; Taylor	Stadium: Wexham Park

27 November 1991 1st Round Replay	Reading	2–1	Slough Town	Reading
	Williams; Lovell		Goal	Stadium: Elm Park

7 December 1991 2nd Round	Peterborough United	0–0	Reading	Peterborough
				Stadium: London Road Stadium

17 December 1991 2nd Round Replay	Reading	1–0	Peterborough United	Reading
	Lovell			Stadium: Elm Park

4 January 1992 3rd Round	Bolton Wanderers	2–0	Reading	Bolton
	Philliskirk			Stadium: Burnden Park; Attendance: 7,301

=== League Cup ===
21 August 1991 1st Round 1st Leg	Cambridge United	1–0	Reading	Cambridge
				Stadium: Abbey Stadium

28 August 1991 1st Round 2nd Leg	Reading	0–3 (0–4 agg.)	Cambridge United	Reading
				Stadium: Elm Park

=== Autoglass Trophy ===
22 October 1991 Southern Primarily; Group 3	Leyton Orient	1–0	Reading	Leyton
				Stadium: Brisbane Road; Attendance: 1,052

20 November 1991 Southern Primarily; Group 3	Northampton Town	2–0	Reading	Northampton
				Stadium: Sixfields Stadium; Attendance: 1,151

== Squad statistics ==
As of match played 2 May 1992

=== Appearances and goals ===
No.	Pos	Nat	Player	Total		Third Division		FA Cup		League Cup		League Trophy	
No.	Pos	Nat	Player	Apps	Goals	Apps	Goals	Apps	Goals	Apps	Goals	Apps	Goals
	GK	(England) ENG	Steve Francis	37	0	32	0	1	0	2	0	2	0
	GK	(England) ENG	Danny Honey	1	0	0	0	1	0	0	0	0	0
	DF	(England) ENG	Nathan Fealey	1	0	1	0	0	0	0	0	0	0
	DF	(Wales) WAL	Linden Jones	32	0	28+1	0	1	0	2	0	0	0
	DF	(England) ENG	Keith McPherson	53	1	44	1	5	0	2	0	2	0
	DF	(England) ENG	Steve Richardson	46	1	38	1	5	0	2	0	1	0
	DF	(Jamaica) JAM	Floyd Streete	41	0	34	0	5	0	0	0	2	0
	DF	(England) ENG	Ady Williams	48	6	40	4	5	2	2	0	1	0
	MF	(England) ENG	Danny Bailey	27	0	23+1	0	3	0	0	0	0	0
	MF	(England) ENG	David Bass	3	0	2+1	0	0	0	0	0	0	0
	MF	(England) ENG	Kevin Dillon	33	3	29	3	1	0	2	0	1	0
	MF	(England) ENG	Aaron Giamettei	2	0	0+2	0	0	0	0	0	0	0
	MF	(England) ENG	Michael Gilkes	27	0	19+1	0	4	0	1+1	0	1	0
	MF	(England) ENG	Mick Gooding	49	4	39+1	3	5	1	2	0	2	0
	MF	(England) ENG	Mark Holzman	22	1	11+5	1	2	0	2	0	2	0
	MF	(England) ENG	Chris Seymour	6	0	3+1	0	0+1	0	0	0	1	0
	MF	(England) ENG	Scott Taylor	34	3	22+7	2	1	1	1+1	0	2	0
	FW	(England) ENG	Lea Barkus	6	0	4+2	0	0	0	0	0	0	0
	FW	(Scotland) SCO	Gerry Britton	4	0	0+2	0	1+1	0	0	0	0	0
	FW	(England) ENG	Andy Gray	1	0	0+1	0	0	0	0	0	0	0
	FW	(Australia) AUS	Stuart Lovell	30	6	16+8	4	2+2	2	0	0	1+1	0
	FW	(England) ENG	Craig Maskell	40	16	29+5	16	5	0	0	0	1	0
	FW	(Scotland) SCO	Mark McGhee	37	5	23+9	5	1	0	1+1	0	2	0
	FW	(England) ENG	David Robinson	8	0	8	0	0	0	0	0	0	0
	FW	(England) ENG	Trevor Senior	28	7	20+5	7	1	0	0+1	0	1	0
Players who appeared for Reading but left during the season:
	GK	(England) ENG	John Keeley	6	0	6	0	0	0	0	0	0	0
	GK	(Scotland) SCO	Jim Leighton	11	0	8	0	3	0	0	0	0	0
	DF	(England) ENG	David Lee	5	5	5	5	0	0	0	0	0	0
	DF	(Northern Ireland) NIR	Steve Morrow	3	0	3	0	0	0	0	0	0	0
	MF	(England) ENG	David Byrne	7	2	7	2	0	0	0	0	0	0
	MF	(England) ENG	Allan Cockram	8	1	2+4	1	0+1	0	0	0	0+1	0
	MF	(Scotland) SCO	Neale Cooper	9	0	7	0	0	0	2	0	0	0
	FW	(England) ENG	Dave Leworthy	9	0	3+3	0	0	0	2	0	0+1	0
	FW	(Scotland) SCO	Steve Archibald	1	0	1	0	0	0	0	0	0	0

=== Goal Scorers ===
Place	Position	Nation	Name	Third Division	FA Cup	League Cup	League Trophy	Total
1	FW	(England)	Craig Maskell	16	0	0	0	16
2	FW	(England)	Trevor Senior	7	0	0	0	7
3	FW	(Australia)	Stuart Lovell	4	2	0	0	6
3	DF	(Wales)	Ady Williams	4	2	0	0	6
5	DF	(England)	David Lee	5	0	0	0	5
5	FW	(Scotland)	Mark McGhee	5	0	0	0	5
7	MF	(England)	Mick Gooding	3	1	0	0	4
8	FW	(England)	Kevin Dillon	3	0	0	0	3
8	Own goal			3	0	0	0	3
8	MF	(England)	Scott Taylor	2	1	0	0	3
11	MF	(England)	David Byrne	2	0	0	0	2
12	FW	(England)	Lea Barkus	1	0	0	0	1
12	MF	(England)	Allan Cockram	1	0	0	0	1
12	MF	(England)	Mark Holzman	1	0	0	0	1
12	DF	(England)	Keith McPherson	1	0	0	0	1
12	DF	(England)	Steve Richardson	1	0	0	0	1
			TOTALS	59	6	0	0	68

== Team kit ==
Reading's kit for the 1991–92 was manufactured by Matchwinner, and the main sponsor was HAT Painting.

1991–92 home colours	1991–92 away colours
