= 1995 Football League First Division play-off final =

Association football match in London

- Event: 1994–95 Football League First Division
Bolton Wanderers	Reading
4	3
- (a.e.t.)
- Date: 29 May 1995
- Venue: Wembley Stadium, London
- Referee: Peter Foakes
- Attendance: 64,107

The 1995 Football League First Division play-off final was an association football match which was played on 29 May 1995 at Wembley Stadium, London, between Bolton Wanderers and Reading. The match was to determine the second and final team to gain promotion from the Football League First Division, the second tier of English football, to the Premiership. The champions of the 1994–95 Football League First Division gained automatic promotion to the Premiership, while the teams placed from second to fifth place in the table partook in play-off semi-finals; Reading ended the season in second position while Bolton Wanderers finished third. The winners of these semi-finals competed for the final place for the 1995–96 season in the Premiership.

The match was played in front of a Wembley crowd of more than 64,000 spectators and was refereed by Peter Foakes. Reading's Lee Nogan opened the scoring after four minutes, before Ady Williams doubled their advantage eight minutes later. Bolton's Jason McAteer then fouled Michael Gilkes and conceded a penalty. Stuart Lovell's spot kick was saved by the Bolton goalkeeper Keith Branagan and the first half ended 2–0. Reading lost Nogan and Andy Bernal through injury midway into the second half, and Bolton's Owen Coyle scored to halve the deficit with fifteen minutes remaining. A late goal from Fabian de Freitas resulted in regular time ending 2–2 and sent the game into extra time. Mixu Paatelainen then put Bolton ahead for the first time in the match, scoring midway through the additional period, and De Freitas scored his second, and Bolton's fourth, with two minutes remaining. A last-minute consolation goal from the Reading player and co-manager Jimmy Quinn meant the match ended 4–3 to Bolton who secured promotion to the Premiership.

Rioch left Bolton in June to become the new manager at Arsenal and was replaced by Roy McFarland, who was sacked after six months with the club bottom of the Premiership. Bolton were subsequently relegated in their first season in the division, after finishing bottom of the table. Reading ended their following season in eighteenth place in the 1995–96 First Division, three places and four points above the relegation zone.

== Route to the final ==
Football League First Division final table, leading positions
Pos	Team	Pld	W	D	L	GF	GA	GD	Pts
1	Middlesbrough	46	23	13	10	67	40	+27	82
2	Reading	46	23	10	13	57	44	+13	79
3	Bolton Wanderers	46	21	14	11	67	45	+22	77
4	Wolverhampton Wanderers	46	21	13	12	77	61	+16	76
5	Tranmere Rovers	46	22	10	14	67	58	+9	76

Following the end of the 1993–94 FA Premiership, it was agreed that the league should be reduced in size from 22 teams to 20, meaning that only two clubs were promoted from the First Division and four would be relegated from the Premiership. As a result, only Middlesbrough, the winners of the league, gained automatic promotion to the Premiership. The teams placed from second to fifth place in the Football League First Division, the second tier of the English football league system, partook in play-off semi-finals. Reading finished the regular 1994–95 season in second place in the table, one place ahead of Bolton Wanderers. Both therefore missed out on automatic promotion and instead took part in the play-offs to determine the second promoted team. Reading finished three points behind league winners Middlesbrough. Bolton ended the season two points behind Reading.

Reading faced Tranmere Rovers in their semi-final play-off with the first leg being played at Prenton Park on 14 May 1995. Reading took an early lead when Stuart Lovell scored in the ninth minute with a volley from Lee Nogan's cross. Despite being under considerable pressure, Tranmere equalised seven minutes later when Chris Malkin headed a cross from John Morrissey into the Reading goal. Reading regained the advantage in the 75th minute through Nogan before Lovell made it 3–1 after converting a rebound from a Nogan shot. The second leg was held at Elm Park in Reading three days later. Once again, Reading dominated the match and midway through the second half Tranmere's Tony Thomas was sent off after being shown two yellow cards. The match ended goalless and Reading qualified for the play-off final with a 3–1 aggregate victory.

Bolton Wanderers' play-off semi-final opponents were Wolverhampton Wanderers and the first leg was played at Molineux in Wolverhampton on 14 May 1995. Steve Bull scored with a header from a Robbie Dennison cross past Peter Shilton in the Bolton goal to open the scoring just before half time. Jason McAteer scored the equaliser for Bolton early in the second half with a chip, before Don Goodman's header across the face of goal was nodded in by Mark Venus to secure a 2–1 victory for Wolves. The second leg of the semi-final took place at Burnden Park in Bolton three days later. John McGinlay's goal in the 44th minute put Bolton ahead and levelled the tie 2–2 on aggregate and with a goalless second half, the game went into extra time. With eleven minutes remaining, McGinlay scored his and Bolton's second, ensuring their 3–2 aggregate victory and qualification for the final.

Reading			Round	Bolton Wanderers
Opponent	Result	Legs	Semi-finals	Opponent	Result	Legs
Tranmere Rovers	3–1	3–1 away; 0–0 home		Wolverhampton Wanderers	3–2	1–2 away; 2–0 (a.e.t.) home

== Match ==
=== Background ===
Bolton had lost the 1991 play-off final to Tranmere and Reading had never featured in a previous play-off final. Reading had played at Wembley Stadium in the 1988 Full Members' Cup Final where they defeated Luton Town 4–1. Bolton's most recent visit to the national stadium was in April, where they lost the 1995 Football League Cup Final against Liverpool. Reading had spent a single season in the second tier of English football, having been promoted the previous season as champions. In their 124-year history, they had never played in the top tier of English football. Bolton had been in the First Division for two seasons, having been promoted in the 1992–93 season, and last played in the top division in the 1979–80 season. Top scorers for Reading were Lovell, with 12 goals in all competitions, followed by Nogan with 11. McGinlay had scored the most goals for Bolton, with 20 in all competitions, with Mixu Paatelainen contributing 14. During the regular season, Bolton won 1–0 at home in January 1995, while Reading won the return fixture 2–1 three months later.

Bolton had made several signings after gaining promotion the previous season. Simon Coleman moved from Sheffield Wednesday for a reported fee of £350,000, Paatelainen was signed from Aberdeen for a similar sum, while Fabian de Freitas was bought from the Dutch club FC Volendam for around £400,000. In contrast, Reading had spent £130,000 on two players and taken in two players on free transfers, before equalling their club transfer fee record of £250,000 when they bought Nogan from Watford in January 1995. In December 1994, then-manager of Reading Mark McGhee left his position to join Premiership club Leicester City, despite having previously been convinced to remain with Reading by the chairman John Madejski. He was replaced in January by co-managers Jimmy Quinn and Mick Gooding. Prior to the final, there was considerable speculation that the Bolton manager Bruce Rioch would be leaving to join one of a number of Premiership clubs, including Manchester City, Arsenal and Sheffield Wednesday.

Bolton's team was struck with several injuries: David Lee had broken three bones in his foot in the second leg of the play-off semi-final, while Mark Patterson, Richard Sneekes and Coleman were also ruled out. Alan Stubbs was receiving treatment for a thigh injury, but secured a place in Bolton's starting eleven. Neil McDonald was also back in the squad, having served a suspension. Reading's Ady Williams was available for selection following his recovery from an ankle injury sustained in the semi-final at Elm Park. Simon Osborn was a doubt with a knee ligament injury, but delayed an operation in order to play.

Reading's Shaka Hislop was named the best second tier goalkeeper in the Professional Footballers' Association Team of the Year. Madejski had promised to walk 45 miles (72 km) to Wembley for Children in Need should his club qualify for the final. The Reading squad spent the week prior the final in Lanzarote, while Bolton prepared for the match in Portugal. Bolton were considered the favourites to win the final by bookmakers, although the defeated semi-final player John Aldridge suggested Reading could cause an upset, saying "If Reading play as well as they did against us they can do it ... It's going to be a classic game at Wembley because Bolton are an attractive side as well." Reading sold their entire allocation of 36,500 tickets for the final, while Bolton were provided with 38,500 tickets, but failed to sell a considerable number of them. Bolton's Chief Executive Officer Des McBain suggested fans may have found the financial burden too much on the back of the previous month's trip to Wembley for the League Cup final. The referee for the match was Peter Foakes of Clacton-on-Sea.

=== First half ===
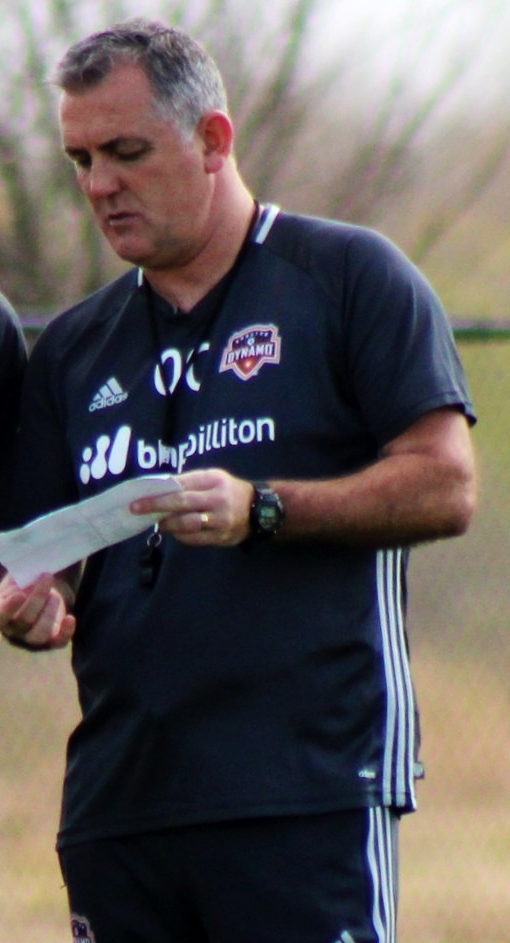
Owen Coyle (pictured in 2016) scored Bolton's first goal.

The match kicked off around 1:30 p.m. in front of a Wembley crowd of 64,107. In the first minute, a backpass from Stubbs was picked up by Bolton's goalkeeper Keith Branagan resulting in Foakes awarding an indirect free kick inside the penalty area. Dariusz Wdowczyk's strike was on target but deflected off Lovell before being cleared. Three minutes later, Reading took the lead through Nogan. He received the ball from Andy Bernal, beat Stubbs and Scott Green before shooting past Branagan to make it 1–0. Reading's Scott Taylor then shot wide before his teammate Williams scored to make it 2–0 after twelve minutes. Osborn's quickly-taken free kick was met by Williams' well-timed run and he steered it past Branagan to double Reading's lead. Guðni Bergsson's header was tipped over by Hislop in the Reading goal before McAteer conceded a penalty in the 35th minute by fouling Michael Gilkes in the Bolton area. Lovell's spot kick was firm but saved by Branagan, and the rebound was struck over by Lovell from 8 yards (7.3 m). With three minutes of the half remaining, Lovell missed another chance when his shot from an errant Stubbs header went wide. The half ended with Reading holding a 2–0 lead.

=== Second half ===
Bolton made their first substitution during half time, with De Freitas coming on to replace McDonald, and with four strikers then on the pitch, they dominated the early stages of the second half. Two minutes in, Paatelainen struck a De Freitas cross over the bar, before De Freitas himself had a shot saved by Hislop and Paataleinan headed an Owen Coyle cross wide. Reading's Nogan and Bernal were substituted off with injuries mid-way through the second half, being replaced by Quinn and Jeff Hopkins respectively. In the 76th minute, McGinlay's cross found Coyle at the far post who out-jumped Keith McPherson to head past Hislop into the Bolton goal, making the score 2–1. Four minutes later, Branagan saved an attempt by Taylor before De Freitas then struck his shot over Reading's crossbar. In the 86th minute, however, De Freitas equalised for Bolton. He received a through ball from Alan Thompson and struck a low shot past Hislop to make it 2–2. Chances from Lovell, Hopkins and Thomson all went close but no further goals were scored and regular time ended 2–2, to send the match into extra time.

=== Extra time and penalties ===
Lovell and Taylor went close for Reading in the opening stages of extra time, while a break from McAteer ended with De Freitas shooting wide. In the 105th minute, Paatelainen put Bolton ahead for the first time in the match with a header. Lovell then had two chances to score either side of half time, and Quinn's volley went wide. De Freitas scored his second goal of the match with two minutes of extra time remaining to make it 4–2 to Bolton, converting the rebound after his initial attempt hit the goalpost. Reading player-manager Jimmy Quinn scored a minute later, his first goal in five months, following a cross from Hopkins but Bolton held out and won the match 4–3.

=== Details ===
29 May 1995
13:30

Bolton Wanderers	4–3 (a.e.t.)	Reading
Coyle 75'; De Freitas 86', 118'; Paatelainen 105'	Report; Bolton shirt numbers Reading shirt numbers	Nogan 4'; Williams 12'; Quinn 119'

Wembley Stadium, London
Attendance: 64,107
Referee: Peter Foakes (Clacton-on-Sea)

Bolton Wanderers	Reading

	Bolton Wanderers
1	Keith Branagan
2	Scott Green
3	Jimmy Phillips
5	Guðni Bergsson
6	Alan Stubbs
7	Neil McDonald	(substituted off) 46'
4	Jason McAteer
9	Mixu Paatelainen
11	Alan Thompson
8	Owen Coyle
10	John McGinlay
Substitutes:
16	Peter Shilton
14	John Dreyer
12	Fabian de Freitas	(substituted on) 46'
Manager:
Bruce Rioch

Reading:
1	Shaka Hislop
2	Andy Bernal	(substituted off) 67'
4	Keith McPherson
6	Dariusz Wdowczyk
5	Ady Williams
7	Michael Gilkes
8	Mick Gooding
3	Simon Osborn
11	Scott Taylor
9	Lee Nogan	(substituted off) 62'
10	Stuart Lovell
Substitutes:
	Simon Sheppard
	Jeff Hopkins	(substituted on) 67'
	Jimmy Quinn	(substituted on) 62'
Manager:
Jimmy Quinn & Mick Gooding

=== Statistics ===
Statistics
	Bolton Wanderers	Reading
Total shots	23	16
Shots on target	10	11
Corner kicks	9	6
Fouls committed	14	18
Offsides	0	3
Yellow cards	3	3
Red cards	0	0

== Post-match ==
The winning manager Rioch suggested that the penalty save to prevent Reading taking a 3–0 lead was "the turning point ... Branagan asked me before the game if I had any information on their penalty-takers. Unfortunately we hadn't, so it was all down to him choosing the right way." De Freitas said he was "looking forward to playing in the Premiership" claiming it would suit his style of play. He commiserated with his opposition: "I feel sorry for Reading, but over the season I felt we had more right to go up." Quinn, one of the Reading co-managers, hoped "some of the new supporters we had today enjoyed the football" and urged them to return to watch the club the following season.

The play-off final proved to be the final game in charge of Bolton Wanderers for manager Rioch, who left the club on 8 June to become the new manager at Arsenal. Roy McFarland was brought in as his successor, but he lasted just six months with the club eight points from safety at the bottom of the Premiership. Bolton were subsequently relegated in their first season in the division, after finishing the 1995–96 Premiership bottom of the table. Reading ended their following season in eighteenth place in the 1995–96 First Division, three places and four points above the relegation zone, but fifteen points outside the play-offs.
