= 1995–96 Fulham F.C. season =

Fulham
1995–96 season
- Manager: Ian Branfoot *Left 19 February 1996*
- Stadium: Craven Cottage
- Third Division: 17th
- FA Cup: Third round
- League Cup: Second round
- Football League Trophy: Southern Quarter Final

During the 1995–96 English football season, Fulham F.C. competed in the Division Three.

== Final league table ==
Pos	Team	Pld	W	D	L	GF	GA	GD	Pts
15	Rochdale	46	14	13	19	57	61	−4	55
16	Cambridge United	46	14	12	20	61	71	−10	54
17	Fulham	46	12	17	17	57	63	−6	53
18	Mansfield Town	46	11	20	15	54	64	−10	53
19	Lincoln City	46	13	14	19	57	73	−16	53

== Results ==
Fulham's score comes first

=== Legend ===
Win	Draw	Loss

=== Football League Third Division ===
Date	Opponent	Venue	Result	Attendance
12 August 1995	Mansfield Town	H	4–2	4,909
19 August 1995	Scarborough	A	2–2	1,946
26 August 1995	Torquay United	H	4–0	4,764
29 August 1995	Darlington	A	1–1	1,906
2 September 1995	Leyton Orient	A	0–1	7,248
9 September 1995	Doncaster Rovers	H	3–1	4,920
12 September 1995	Rochdale	H	1–1	4,013
16 September 1995	Exeter City	A	1–2	4,420
23 September 1995	Preston North End	H	2–2	5,279
30 September 1995	Northampton Town	A	0–2	5,778
7 October 1995	Plymouth Argyle	A	0–3	6,681
14 October 1995	Bury	H	0–0	3,803
21 October 1995	Chester City	A	1–1	2,752
28 October 1995	Hereford United	H	0–0	3,631
31 October 1995	Colchester United	H	0–0	2,870
4 November 1995	Wigan Athletic	A	1–1	2,438
18 November 1995	Barnet	H	1–1	4,369
25 November 1995	Gillingham	A	0–1	7,608
9 December 1995	Preston North End	A	1–1	8,131
16 December 1995	Northampton Town	H	1–3	3,421
19 December 1995	Cardiff City	H	4–2	2,284
26 December 1995	Lincoln City	H	0–4	3,693
13 January 1996	Scarborough	H	1–0	3,557
20 January 1996	Mansfield Town	A	0–1	2,025
30 January 1996	Scunthorpe United	H	1–3	2,176
3 February 1996	Torquay United	A	1–2	2,594
10 February 1996	Hartlepool United	H	2–2	3,700
13 February 1996	Cambridge United	A	0–0	2,233
17 February 1996	Rochdale	A	1–1	1,923
24 February 1996	Exeter City	H	4–1	4,048
26 February 1996	Doncaster Rovers	A	2–0	2,331
2 March 1996	Lincoln City	H	1–2	4,245
5 March 1996	Darlington	H	2–2	2,534
9 March 1996	Cardiff City	A	4–1	3,489
12 March 1996	Hartlepool United	A	0–1	1,198
16 March 1996	Cambridge United	H	0–2	3,872
23 March 1996	Scunthorpe United	A	1–3	3,872
26 March 1996	Leyton Orient	H	2–1	3,636
30 March 1996	Plymouth Argyle	H	4–0	5,617
2 April 1996	Bury	A	0–3	3,371
6 April 1996	Hereford United	A	0–1	3,180
8 April 1996	Chester City	H	2–0	3,777
13 April 1996	Colchester United	A	2–2	3,796
20 April 1996	Wigan Athletic	H	1–0	4,657
27 April 1996	Gillingham	A	0–0	10,320
4 May 1996	Barnet	A	0–3	4,332

=== FA Cup ===
Round	Date	Opponent	Venue	Result	Notes
R1	11 November 1995	Swansea City	H	7–0	
R2	2 December 1995	Brighton & Hove Albion	H	0–0	
R2R	14 December 1995	Brighton & Hove Albion	A	0–0	Fulham won 4–1 on penalties
R3	2 December 1995	Shrewsbury Town	H	1–1	
R3R	14 December 1995	Shrewsbury Town	A	1–2	

=== League Cup ===
Round	Date	Opponent	Venue	Result	Attendance	Notes
R1 1st Leg	15 August 1995	Brighton & Hove Albion	H	3–0	4,380	
R1 2nd Leg	22 August 1995	Brighton & Hove Albion	A	2–0	3,799	Fulham won 5–0 on aggregate
R2 1st Leg	20 September 1995	Wolverhampton Wanderers	A	0–2	20,381	
R2 2nd Leg	3 October 1995	Wolverhampton Wanderers	A	1–5	6,625	Wolverhampton Wanderers won 7–1 on aggregate

=== Football League Trophy ===
Round	Date	Opponent	Venue	Result	Attendance	Notes
SR1	10 October 1995	Wycombe Wanderers	A	1–1	2,756	
SR1	17 October 1995	Walsall	H	2–5	1,315	
SR2	28 November 1995	Brentford	A	1–0	3,760	
SQF	9 January 1996	Bristol Rovers	H	1–2	2,479	A.E.T

== Squad ==
Note: Flags indicate national team as defined under FIFA eligibility rules; some limited exceptions apply. Players may hold more than one non-FIFA nationality.

No.	Pos.	Nation	Player
—	GK	(England) ENG	Tony Lange
—	GK	(England) ENG	Lee Harrison
—	DF	(England) ENG	Danny Bower
—	DF	(England) ENG	Gary Simpson
—	DF	(England) ENG	Micky Adams
—	DF	(England) ENG	Mark Blake
—	DF	(England) ENG	Robbie Herrera
—	DF	(England) ENG	Mark Taylor
—	DF	(England) ENG	Terry Angus
—	DF	(England) ENG	Simon Morgan
—	DF	(England) ENG	Kevin Moore
—	DF	(England) ENG	Rob Scott
—	DF	(England) ENG	John Marshall
—	DF	(England) ENG	Duncan Jupp

No.	Pos.	Nation	Player
—	MF	(England) ENG	Nick Cusack
—	MF	(England) ENG	Tony Finnigan
—	MF	(Northern Ireland) NIR	Rory Hamill
—	MF	(England) ENG	Michael Mison
—	MF	(England) ENG	Martin Thomas
—	MF	(England) ENG	Phil Barber (on loan from Bristol City)
—	MF	(England) ENG	Danny Bolt
—	MF	(England) ENG	Martin Gray (on loan from Sunderland)
—	MF	(England) ENG	John Hamsher
—	MF	(Northern Ireland) NIR	Rod McAree
—	MF	(England) ENG	Carl Williams
—	MF	(England) ENG	Paul Brooker
—	FW	(England) ENG	Lea Barkus
—	FW	(Scotland) SCO	Mike Conroy
—	FW	(England) ENG	Gary Brazil
