= Lea Barkus =

English footballer

Personal information
- Date of birth: 7 December 1974 (age 51)
- Place of birth: Reading, England
- Height: 5 ft 6 in (1.68 m)
- Position: Forward

Team information
- Current team: Bracknell Town (First Team Coach)

Youth career
- ?–1991: Reading

Senior career*
Years	Team	Apps	(Gls)
1991–1995	Reading	15	(1)
1995–1997	Fulham	9	(1)
Total		24	(2)
- * Club domestic league appearances and goals

Lea Barkus (born 7 December 1974) is an English former footballer who played as forward for Reading and Fulham. He was forced to retire from the professional game at just 22 due to a persistent back injury.

== Career ==
Born in Reading, Barkus began his career in the Youth Training Scheme at his hometown club. After progressing through the youth teams, he made his first team debut in March 1992 age 17 against Chester City and was awarded man-of-the match for his performance. A few weeks later he scored his first goal in the 6–1 win over Torquay United though soon after he began to suffer from persistent back problems. He made a further 11 appearances during the 1992–93 season but failed to add to his goal tally and never made another appearance for the first team, though he was part of the Reading reserve side that won the Berks & Bucks Senior Cup in 1994.

Although he had not played for the Reading first team since the 1992–93 season, and with his back problems to continue to hamper him despite surgery, Barkus joined Fulham for £20,000 in 1995. He made 16 appearances during the 1995–96 season, scoring twice, but did not feature again and in 1997 was forced to retire as a professional due to his back problems. He moved into non-league football and then coaching. As of the 2013–14 season he is a youth coach with East Berkshire Football League side Bracknell Cavaliers. In April 2021 Lea was appointed interim manager of Combined Counties side Sandhurst Town.

== Career statistics ==
Appearances and goals by club, season and competition
Club	Season	League			FA Cup		League Cup		Other		Total	
Club	Season	Division	Apps	Goals	Apps	Goals	Apps	Goals	Apps	Goals	Apps	Goals
Reading	1991–92	Third Division	6	1	0	0	0	0	0	0	6	1
Reading	1992–93	Second Division	9	0	1	0	0	0	1 (Note: Appearance(s) in the Football League Trophy)	0	11	0
Reading	1993–94	Second Division	0	0	0	0	0	0	0	0	0	0
Reading	1994–95	First Division	0	0	0	0	0	0	0	0	0	0
Reading	Total		15	1	1	0	0	0	1	0	17	1
Fulham	1995–96	Third Division	9	1	3	0	2	1	2	0	16	2
Career total			24	2	4	0	2	1	3	0	33	3

== Honours ==
- Berks & Bucks Senior Cup: 1994
