= Ian McGuckin =

English footballer

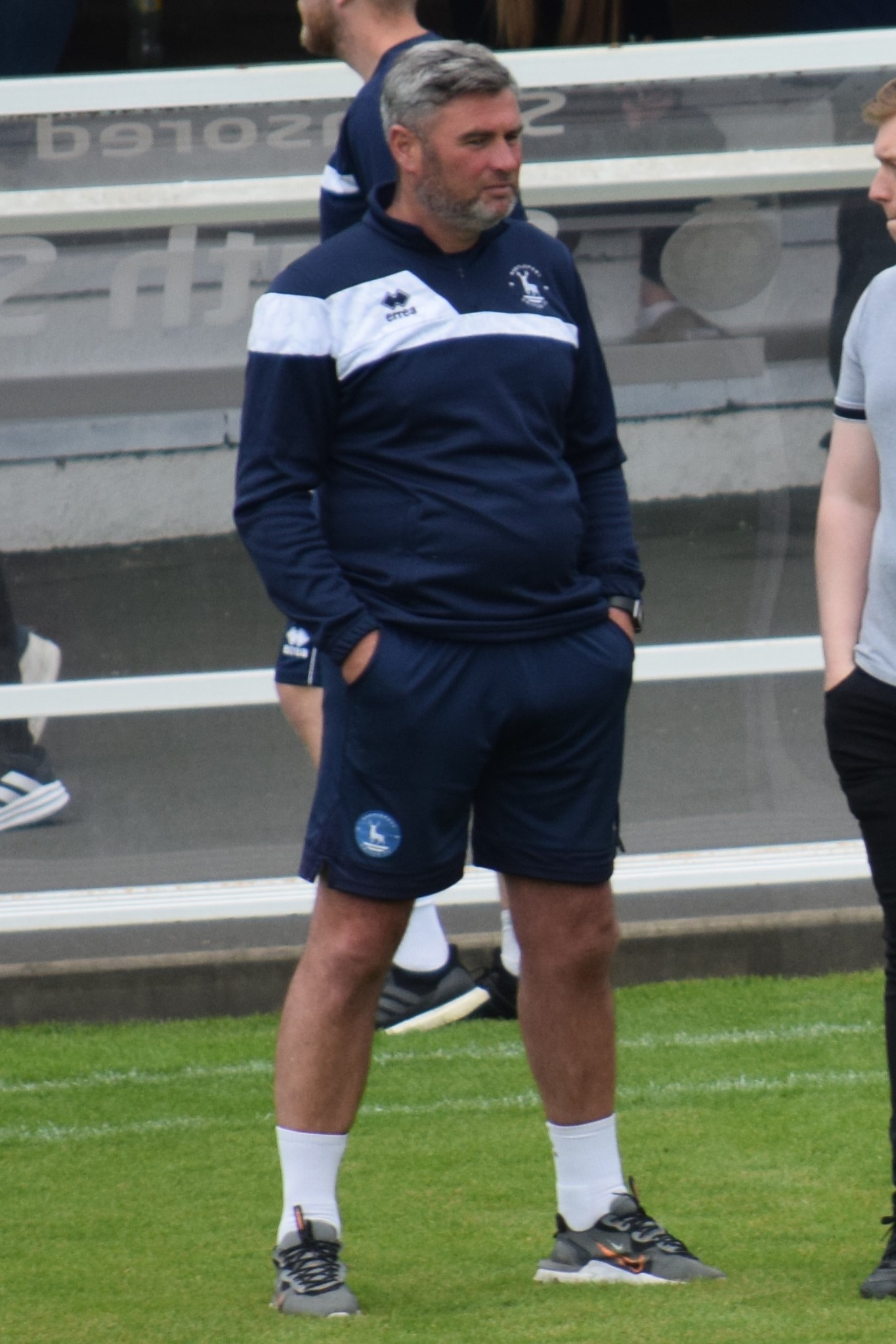
- McGuckin in 2024

Personal information
- Date of birth: 24 April 1973 (age 53)
- Place of birth: Middlesbrough, England
- Position: Defender

Senior career*
Years	Team	Apps	(Gls)
1991–1997	Hartlepool United	152	(8)
1997–2000	Fulham	0	(0)
1998–1999	→ Hartlepool United (loan)	8	(0)
2000–2001	Oxford United	7	(0)
- Barrow
Total		167	(8)
- * Club domestic league appearances and goals

Ian McGuckin (born 24 April 1973) is an English former footballer who played in the Football League for Fulham, Hartlepool United and Oxford United.

== Playing career ==
He was born on 24 April 1973 in Middlesbrough.

On 14 March 1992, McGuckin made his competitive Hartlepool United debut in a Third Division match, a 2–0 home win against Darlington. On 23 January 1995, he signed a new 18-month contract with Hartlepool. On 6 February 1999, McGuckin made his final Hartlepool appearance in a 2–0 home win against Halifax Town. He made 186 appearances for the club in total, scoring 9 times.

== Coaching career ==
Following his retirement from playing, McGuckin re-joined Hartlepool in various coaching capacities, most notably in their academy. In November 2024, he accepted a role at Middlesbrough's academy. In a club statement, Hartlepool commented: "We would like to thank Ian for his incredible service over the 17 years that he has been a part of Hartlepool United. Ian has shown his professionalism and passion throughout every role he's undertaken. It's been fantastic to see Ian's development as a coach and he thoroughly deserves this new opportunity. We wish him the best of luck."
