= Shaka Hislop =

Trinidad and Tobago footballer (born 1969)

Shaka Hislop CM
- Hislop in 2025

Personal information
- Full name: Neil Shaka Hislop
- Date of birth: 22 February 1969 (age 57)
- Place of birth: Hackney, London, England
- Height: 1.93 m (6 ft 4 in)
- Position: Goalkeeper

College career
Years	Team	Apps	(Gls)
1987–1991	Howard Bison		

Senior career*
Years	Team	Apps	(Gls)
1992–1995	Reading	104	(0)
1995–1998	Newcastle United	53	(0)
1998–2002	West Ham United	105	(0)
2002–2005	Portsmouth	93	(0)
2005–2006	West Ham United	16	(0)
2006–2007	FC Dallas	10	(0)
Total		381	(0)

International career
1998	England U21	1	(0)
1999–2006	Trinidad and Tobago	26	(0)
- * Club domestic league appearances and goals

Neil Shaka Hislop CM (born 22 February 1969) is a football commentator and former player who played as a goalkeeper. Born in England, he played for the England under-21 team before representing Trinidad and Tobago at senior international level.

Hislop spent majority of his playing career in the top division in England where he was a part of the Newcastle United team which finished second in the Premier League for two successive seasons under Kevin Keegan. Before this, he played for Reading, where he was on the losing side in the First Division play-offs despite finishing second overall (the only occasion on which second place was not an automatic promotion position). He later played for West Ham United in two spells (receiving an FA Cup runners-up medal during his second season in 2006) and also for Portsmouth (where he won the First Division in 2002–03).

Hislop was eligible to play for both England and Trinidad and Tobago. He initially played for the England under-21 team and was on the bench for a full international against Chile, but in the end opted to play for Trinidad and Tobago. A dispute with the national team ruled him out of contention for several years, but he returned to play and starred in the country's first ever World Cup appearance in 2006.

Hislop is now working for sports news and broadcasting service ESPN where he is most often seen as a commentator on ESPN FC. He had also briefly worked as a goalkeeping coach for the football team at Quinnipiac University.

== Club career ==
=== Early career ===
At an early age, Hislop wanted to be a striker, but was put as goalkeeper as he was the tallest player on his team. He eventually grew to just under 6'5" in height. After graduating from St. Mary's College in Trinidad, Hislop earned a scholarship to play college soccer at Howard University in the United States and led his team to the NCAA Final as a freshman starter. He graduated from Howard with honours with a degree in Mechanical Engineering. During this time, he interned at NASA.

=== Reading ===
Shortly after graduating, Hislop was spotted by a scout from Reading at a friendly indoor match against Aston Villa of the Premier League. He went on to sign professional forms with Reading for the 1992–93 season and remained there for two more years. While there, he established himself as a firm fan favourite after an uncertain start, twice earning the club's "Player of the Year" award. He was instrumental in Reading's rise from the third tier of English football to the brink of the Premier League, where he narrowly missed out on promotion following a 4–3 defeat to Bolton Wanderers in the 1995 play-off final, and was voted the club's Player of the Season in 1994–95. Hislop was one of many Reading players to move that summer of 1995, signing with Newcastle United for £1.575 million. In a poll to compile Reading's greatest-ever XI, Hislop was voted the best goalkeeper with 46.7% of the vote ahead of Steve Death and Marcus Hahnemann. He was also voted joint third along with Death in a poll to decide the club's 'Player of the Millennium'.

=== Newcastle United ===
Hislop's first season at Newcastle United was spent battling with incumbent goalkeeper Pavel Srníček for the starting role. After starting strongly and being the starter through until December 1995, Hislop suffered an injury against Chelsea that allowed Srníček to regain the starting role. Hislop then did not return until April 1996 for the final six games of the season. That season Newcastle lost a 12-point lead in January to finish the season in second place.

In 1996–97, Hislop started the first league game of the season against Everton but then remained on the bench thereafter. He had to watch Srníček tend the nets until a perceived dip in form and a number of mistakes from Srníček allowed Hislop to take the starting role back again in December 1996, and he made only his second league start of the year in a 7–1 defeat of Tottenham Hotspur. Hislop successfully retained the starting position until the final 4 games of the season when Srníček returned, as Newcastle pipped Arsenal and Liverpool to second place on goal difference at the end of the season.

Hislop's role further came under threat when new manager Kenny Dalglish opted to purchase a former player of his own from Blackburn Rovers. Dalglish brought in Shay Given, costing £1.5 million, and a season-long battle for the number one spot ensued between the two goalkeepers. Given initially started the season, but after a string of defeats and five games without a win, Dalglish went back to Hislop in November and he stayed there until an injury in February allowed Given back into the frame. With his contract running out, and having not yet managed to play a full season at Newcastle, Hislop chose to leave on a free transfer.

=== West Ham United ===
West Ham United had operated a "goalkeeper by committee" approach the previous season, seeing first Luděk Mikloško, then Craig Forrest, then Bernard Lama hold the starting role. With Mikloško now with Queens Park Rangers and with the team being unable to secure Lama beyond his three-month loan, Harry Redknapp snapped up Hislop and installed him as first choice goalkeeper.

In 1998–99, Hislop's first season saw him provide excellent service to the team, culminating in winning the "Hammer of the Year" award at the first attempt. His following season seemed to be following suit until he broke his leg in a match against Bradford City. The game saw young Stephen Bywater make his league debut in a 5–4 victory, but signalled the end of Hislop's season.

Hislop returned the following year in 2000–01 but in a tumultuous season, he saw his manager fired, and two of the club's most promising players in Rio Ferdinand and Frank Lampard sold on. His performances were strong in an unsettled team. However, new manager Glenn Roeder purchased the unsettled David James from Aston Villa, who had publicly fallen foul of his manager John Gregory. The deal was seen as a coup for West Ham, though it resigned Hislop to the bench for what was seen to be his final season with the club as James (a year younger) was intended to be the long-term option.

However, before the 2001–02 season could even start, James tore his knee ligaments on England-duty after a collision with Martin Keown. The injury ruled James out for the first three months of the season. Hislop instantly stepped back into his starting role and kept five clean sheets in his 12 appearances that year for the club (though he also featured in the back to back drubbings from Everton 5–0 and Blackburn Rovers 7–1. However, James reclaimed the starting role, and on 1 July 2002, Hislop left the club on a free transfer.

=== Portsmouth ===
Hislop joined Portsmouth after Harry Redknapp became their new manager. He quickly asserted himself as the starter in the side that won the First Division title, ensuring automatic promotion to the Premier League. In recognition of his exploits for the season he was named in the First Division's 'Team of the Year' and remained first choice for the next two seasons in the Premiership, despite competition from Harald Wapenaar and later, Jamie Ashdown. In January 2005, following the replacement of Redknapp as manager, his replacement Velimir Zajec signed Greek international Konstantinos Chalkias and Hislop faced more competition for a place on the team.

Following the appointment of a new manager Alain Perrin, Hislop failed to regain his starting place in favour of ex-Liverpool keeper Sander Westerveld, and when his contract expired in June 2005, he was released by the club.

=== Return to West Ham ===
On 29 July 2005, Hislop rejoined West Ham as experienced cover along with Jimmy Walker for new signing Roy Carroll, allowing Stephen Bywater to go out on loan. Carroll started strongly but a back injury saw Hislop make occasional appearances through the season until Christmas. In January, Carroll's injury forced him to the physio's table once again, and Hislop stepped back into the fold as the starter (rotating with Walker). He featured in every FA Cup game as the team made its way to the final against Liverpool, keeping seven clean sheets in 27 appearances. The FA Cup Final finished 3–3 after a late equaliser from Steven Gerrard in the 91st minute. Hislop saving Sami Hyypiä's penalty was not enough for his team as Liverpool won the game 3–1 on penalty kicks after Anton Ferdinand missed the final West Ham spot kick of the day.

=== FC Dallas ===
On 5 July 2006, Hislop signed for Major League Soccer team FC Dallas in the United States. After suffering a back injury, Hislop left FC Dallas and retired from professional football in August 2007.

== International career ==
=== Youth ===
Hislop was a youth international for Trinidad and Tobago. He had played in three games for Trinidad and Tobago before 1989.

In 1992, he was called up to the Trinidad national football team but was an unused substitute in three games. In May 1995, he said that he would prefer to play for England as he was born and raised there, and the standard of competition was higher.

=== England ===
Hislop was called up for England against Chile at Wembley Stadium in February 1998. A month later, at the age of 29, he was one of three over-age players selected to play for the England U-21 side against Switzerland.

=== Trinidad and Tobago ===
Eventually, Hislop chose to represent Trinidad and Tobago at the senior level. He played a total of 26 times for the Twin Island nation, also captaining the team in five matches.

Hislop had announced his retirement from international football in 2004, citing the long journeys between England and the Caribbean as a factor, but returned to the national team to aid them in the 2006 FIFA World Cup Qualifiers at the request of the Trinidad and Tobago national team management. In 2005, he was part of the Trinidad and Tobago side that qualified for the 2006 World Cup with a victory over Bahrain. The draw for the World Cup placed them in Group B alongside Sweden, Paraguay and England. On 10 June 2006, Hislop played in the Trinidad and Tobago national team's first ever World Cup match, a 0–0 draw against Sweden, replacing Kelvin Jack who suffered a calf injury in the warm-up. Writing in The Times, he would call the occasion 'the proudest day of his career'.

== Coaching career ==
On 17 March 2009, Hislop signed a contract to be an assistant coach while primarily working with the goalkeepers of the Quinnipiac University football team. After a brief period he resigned as coach due to his media commitments with ESPN.

== Media work ==
In 2008, Hislop began a weekly blog covering Major League Soccer for the British newspaper The Guardian's website. He works as a commentator on ESPN FC TV and in addition to commentary he has also interviewed several major footballing figures, including his former club manager Harry Redknapp after his move from Portsmouth to Tottenham Hotspur, USA international goalkeeper Kasey Keller, and Portuguese manager José Mourinho after he led Chelsea to the Premier League title in 2015.

== Personal life ==
Hislop married his wife, Desha, in 1995. He is the cousin of American sprint athlete Natasha Hastings. He has five children; his daughter Khazia Hislop was a gymnast. His other daughter, Nia Hislop, plays football and has been capped for Trinidad and Tobago.

His brother Kona played for Livingston and Hartlepool United.

In July 2023, Hislop collapsed on air while working as an analyst for ESPN at the Rose Bowl, Pasadena. He later described the incident as "awkward" and said that he was seeking medical opinion.

In December 2025, Hislop announced that he had what he described as "fairly aggressive prostate cancer". He said that he had undergone a prostatectomy a year earlier, and advised other men of Caribbean origin to be aware of prostate cancer due to elevated risk.

== Career statistics ==
=== Club ===
Appearances and goals by club, season and competition
Club	Season	League	League		Cup^{1}		League Cup^{2}		Continental^{3}		Other^{4}		Total	
Club	Season	League	Apps	Goals	Apps	Goals	Apps	Goals	Apps	Goals	Apps	Goals	Apps	Goals
Reading	1992–93	Second Division	12	0	0	0	2	0	—		2	0	16	0
Reading	1993–94	Second Division	46	0	2	0	4	0	—		4	0	56	0
Reading	1994–95	First Division	46	0	1	0	4	0	—		3	0	54	0
Reading	Total		104	0	3	0	10	0	—		9	0	126	0
Newcastle United	1995–96	Premier League	24	0	0	0	4	0	—		—		28	10
Newcastle United	1996–97	Premier League	16	0	3	0	1	0	2	0	0	0	22	4
Newcastle United	1997–98	Premier League	13	0	3	0	3	0	2	1	–		21	6
Newcastle United	Total		53	0	6	0	8	0	4	0	—		71	25
West Ham United	1998–99	Premier League	37	0	2	0	2	0	—		—		41	15
West Ham United	1999–2000	Premier League	22	0	1	0	3	0	9	0	—		35	9
West Ham United	2000–01	Premier League	34	0	4	0	4	0	—		—		42	12
West Ham United	2001–02	Premier League	12	0	0	0	1	0	—		—		13	5
West Ham United	Total		105	0	7	0	11	0	9	0	—		132	41
Portsmouth	2002–03	First Divisioin	46	0	1	0	2	0	—		—		49	18
Portsmouth	2003–04	Premier League	30	0	4	0	0	0	—		—		34	7
Portsmouth	2004–05	Premier League	17	0	0	0	0	0	—		—		17	3
Portsmouth	Total		93	0	5	0	2	0	—		—		100	28
West Ham United	2005–06	Premier League	16	0	7	0	2	0	—		—		25	7
FC Dallas	2006	MLS	4	0	2	0	—		—		—		6	0
FC Dallas	2007	MLS	6	0	0	0	—		0	0	—		6	0
FC Dallas	Total		10	0	2	0	—		0	0	—		12	0
Career total			381	77	30	6	33	8	13	5	9	0	466	96

^{1} – includes FA Cup and U.S. Open Cup

^{2} – includes EFL Cup and MLS Cup Playoffs
^{3} – includes UEFA Cup, Intertoto Cup and North American SuperLiga
^{4} – includes Charity Shield and Football League Trophy

=== International ===
Appearances and goals by national team and year
National team	Year	Apps	Goals
Trinidad and Tobago	1999	3	0
Trinidad and Tobago	2000	1	0
Trinidad and Tobago	2001	7	0
Trinidad and Tobago	2002	2	0
Trinidad and Tobago	2003	0	0
Trinidad and Tobago	2004	4	0
Trinidad and Tobago	2005	5	0
Trinidad and Tobago	2006	4	0
Total		26	0

== Honours ==
Howard Bison

- NCAA Division I Championship runner-up: 1988
- NCAA Tournament College Cup: 2008

Reading

- Football League Second Division: 1993–94
- Football League First Division runner-up: 1994–95

Newcastle United

- FA Cup runner-up: 1997–98

West Ham United

- UEFA Intertoto Cup: 1999
- FA Cup runner-up: 2005–06

Portsmouth

- Football League First Division: 2002–03

Individual

- PFA Team of the Year: 1994–95 First Division, 2002–03 First Division
- Chaconia Medal in gold: 2006
- Freedom of the City of Newcastle upon Tyne: 13 May 2022

== Awards ==
In April 2005, Hislop was named the inaugural winner of the PFA Special Merit Award for his services to football. He has been a pioneer of football's 'Show Racism The Red Card' Campaign. He was also inducted into Howard University's Athletic Hall of Fame, only the fifth Association Football player to be so honoured.

Following the Trinidad and Tobago national team's inspirational performance in the World Cup, Hislop and his teammates were awarded the Chaconia Medal in gold, the second highest national award for Trinidad and Tobago. He is entitled to add the 'CM' suffix to his name, as and when desired.

In 2007, Hislop received the Alexander B. Chapman Award from the Trinidad and Tobago Olympic Committee for outstanding contribution to sport and the promotion of Olympic ideals. He is a member of the Professional Footballer's Association's Roll of Honour, joining Pelé with the distinction of being the only two non-British members.

On 10 July 2008, Hislop became the first member of the Trinidad and Tobago World Cup squad to be inducted into his country's Sporting Hall of Fame.

It was announced on 23 February 2022 that he was to be awarded the Freedom of the City of Newcastle upon Tyne.
