= John Hamsher =

English footballer

Personal information
- Full name: John James Hamsher
- Date of birth: 14 January 1978 (age 48)
- Place of birth: Lambeth, England
- Height: 1.78 m (5 ft 10 in)
- Position: Right back

Youth career
- 1994–1996: Fulham

Senior career*
Years	Team	Apps	(Gls)
1996–1997	Fulham	3	(0)
1997–2001	Rushden & Diamonds	66	(4)
2000–2001	→ Dagenham & Redbridge (loan)	4	(0)
2001–2002	Stevenage Borough	48	(4)
2002–2005	Carshalton Athletic		
2005–2007	Metropolitan Police		
2007–2008	Cove		
2008	Chertsey Town		
2008–2009	Guildford City		
2009	Banstead Athletic		

Managerial career
- 2011–2012: Egham Town
- 2012–2013: Chipstead
- 2014: Hanworth Villa
- * Club domestic league appearances and goals

John James Hamsher (born 14 January 1978) is an English footballer who played as a right back. He played in the Football League for Fulham.

== Career ==
Hamsher started his career in 1994 when he joined the youth setup at Fulham. He made three substitute appearances for the Cottagers in 1996 before he was released in the summer of 1997. Following his release he signed for Conference side Rushden & Diamonds in August 1997.
