= Stuart Lovell =

Australian soccer player

Personal information
- Full name: Stuart Andrew Lovell
- Date of birth: 9 January 1972 (age 54)
- Place of birth: Sydney, Australia
- Height: 5 ft 10 in (1.78 m)
- Positions: Striker; midfielder

Youth career
- Reading

Senior career*
Years	Team	Apps	(Gls)
1990–1998	Reading	227	(58)
1998–2001	Hibernian	88	(17)
2001–2005	Livingston	87	(6)
2005–2006	Queen of the South	38	(1)
Total		440	(82)

International career
2000	Australia	2	(0)
- * Club domestic league appearances and goals

Stuart Andrew Lovell (born 9 January 1972 in Sydney, Australia) is an Australian professional footballer, who played as a striker early in his career, before reverting to a midfield role later in his career.

== Playing career ==
Lovell was born in Sydney, Australia and spent his childhood in Reading, Berkshire. He joined the local professional team and was part of the Reading team that narrowly missed out on promotion to the Premier League in the 1994–95 season. He had a penalty kick saved in the playoff final against Bolton Wanderers when Reading were leading 2–0; they eventually lost 4–3 after extra time.

After damaging a cruciate ligament in 1997 and almost having his career ended as a result, Lovell moved to Scottish club Hibernian in 1998, ultimately prolonging his career by nearly a decade.

Hibs were in the First Division at the time and he was part of the team who won promotion back to the Scottish Premier League by winning the First Division. He was capped twice by Australia and was a Hibs first team regular as they finished a creditable third in the SPL and reached the 2000-01 Scottish Cup Final.

In the summer of 2001, Lovell surprisingly left Hibs to sign for SPL newcomers Livingston, who he helped to finish third in their first season in the SPL. He subsequently skippered the club to their only major trophy to date, the Scottish League Cup in 2004. Livingston defeated Hibs 2–0 in the final.

Lovell retired after a 15-month spell with Dumfries club Queen of the South, where he also had a spell as caretaker manager.

== Post-playing career ==
Lovell has since done media work, appearing on Setanta Sports and Sky Sports, and writing a column for the Edinburgh Evening News. He also commentates for Hibs TV and has served as a representative of PFA Scotland.

As of 2022, Lovell is a Network Programme Manager for Street Soccer.

== Career statistics ==
=== Club ===
Appearances and goals by club, season and competition
Club	Season	League			National Cup		League Cup		Continental		Other		Total	
Club	Season	Division	Apps	Goals	Apps	Goals	Apps	Goals	Apps	Goals	Apps	Goals	Apps	Goals
Reading	1990–91	Third Division	30	2	0	0	0	0	0	0	2	0	32	2
Reading	1991–92	Third Division	24	4	4	2	0	0	0	0	2	0	30	6
Reading	1992–93	Second Division	22	8	3	0	1	0	0	0	0	0	26	8
Reading	1993–94	Second Division	45	20	2	0	4	2	0	0	3	0	54	22
Reading	1994–95	First Division	30	11	1	0	4	1	0	0	6	4	41	16
Reading	1995–96	First Division	35	7	2	0	3	2	0	0	0	0	40	9
Reading	1996–97	First Division	26	5	1	0	1	0	0	0	0	0	28	5
Reading	1997–98	First Division	15	1	3	0	0	0	0	0	0	0	18	1
Reading	Reading total		227	58	16	2	13	5	0	0	13	4	269	69
Hibernian	1998–99	Scottish First Division	31	11	2	0	3	1	0	0	0	0	36	12
Hibernian	1999–2000	Scottish Premier League	26	1	5	1	1	0	0	0	0	0	32	2
Hibernian	2000–01	Scottish Premier League	31	5	3	0	2	0	0	0	0	0	36	5
Hibernian	Hibernian total		88	17	10	1	6	1	0	0	0	0	104	19
Livingston	2001–02	Scottish Premier League	27	3	0	0	1	1	0	0	0	0	28	4
Livingston	2002–03	Scottish Premier League	15	1	1	0	0	0	2	1	0	0	18	2
Livingston	2003–04	Scottish Premier League	25	1	5	0	4	0	0	0	0	0	34	1
Livingston	2004–05	Scottish Premier League	20	1	1	0	3	0	0	0	0	0	24	1
Livingston	Livingston total		87	6	7	0	8	1	2	1	0	0	104	8
Queen of the South	2004–05	Scottish First Division	12	0	0	0	0	0	0	0	0	0	12	0
Queen of the South	2005–06	Scottish First Division	26	1	2	0	1	0	0	0	1	1	30	2
Queen of the South	QoS total		38	1	2	0	1	0	0	0	1	1	42	2
Career total			440	82	35	3	28	7	2	1	14	5	519	98

== Honours ==
Reading

- Football League Second Division: 1993–94

Hibernian

- Scottish Football League First Division: 1998–99

Livingston

- Scottish League Cup: 2003–04
