= David McDonald (footballer) =

Irish footballer (born 1971)

Personal information
- Full name: David Hugh McDonald
- Date of birth: 2 January 1971 (age 55)
- Place of birth: Dublin, Republic of Ireland
- Position: Full back

Senior career*
Years	Team	Apps	(Gls)
1988–1993	Tottenham Hotspur	3	(0)
1990	→ Gillingham (loan)	10	(0)
1992	→ Bradford City (loan)	7	(0)
1993	→ Reading (loan)	11	(0)
1993–1994	Peterborough United	29	(0)
1994–1998	Barnet	96	(0)
- Welling United
- Enfield
Total		156	(0)

International career
1991	Republic of Ireland U21	3	(0)
1992	Republic of Ireland B	1	(0)
- * Club domestic league appearances and goals

David McDonald (born 2 January 1971) is an Irish retired football defender.

At Tottenham he only made three league appearances, one of which was playing the full 90 minutes as his side beat rivals Arsenal at Highbury on the last day of the 1992–93 season.
