= Simon Sheppard (footballer) =

English footballer

Personal information
- Full name: Simon Sheppard
- Date of birth: 7 August 1973 (age 53)
- Place of birth: Clevedon, England
- Height: 6 ft 4 in (1.93 m)
- Position: Goalkeeper

Senior career*
Years	Team	Apps	(Gls)
1991–1994	Watford	23	(0)
1994	→ Scarborough (loan)	9	(0)
1994–1996	Reading	18	(0)
1996–1997	Boreham Wood	?	(0)
1997–1998	Kettering Town	?	(0)
Total		50	(0)

International career
1993	England U20		
- * Club domestic league appearances and goals

Simon Sheppard (born 7 August 1973 in Clevedon) is an English former football goalkeeper. During his career he played in the Football League for Watford, Scarborough, Reading, and Chelsea before dropping into non-league football with Boreham Wood and Kettering Town. Sheppard played for England at schoolboy level, and also represented his country at the 1993 FIFA World Youth Championship. He was one of three Watford youth goalkeepers from the 1980s to play for his country; the other two were David James and Derick Williams.
