= Danny Bailey =

English footballer

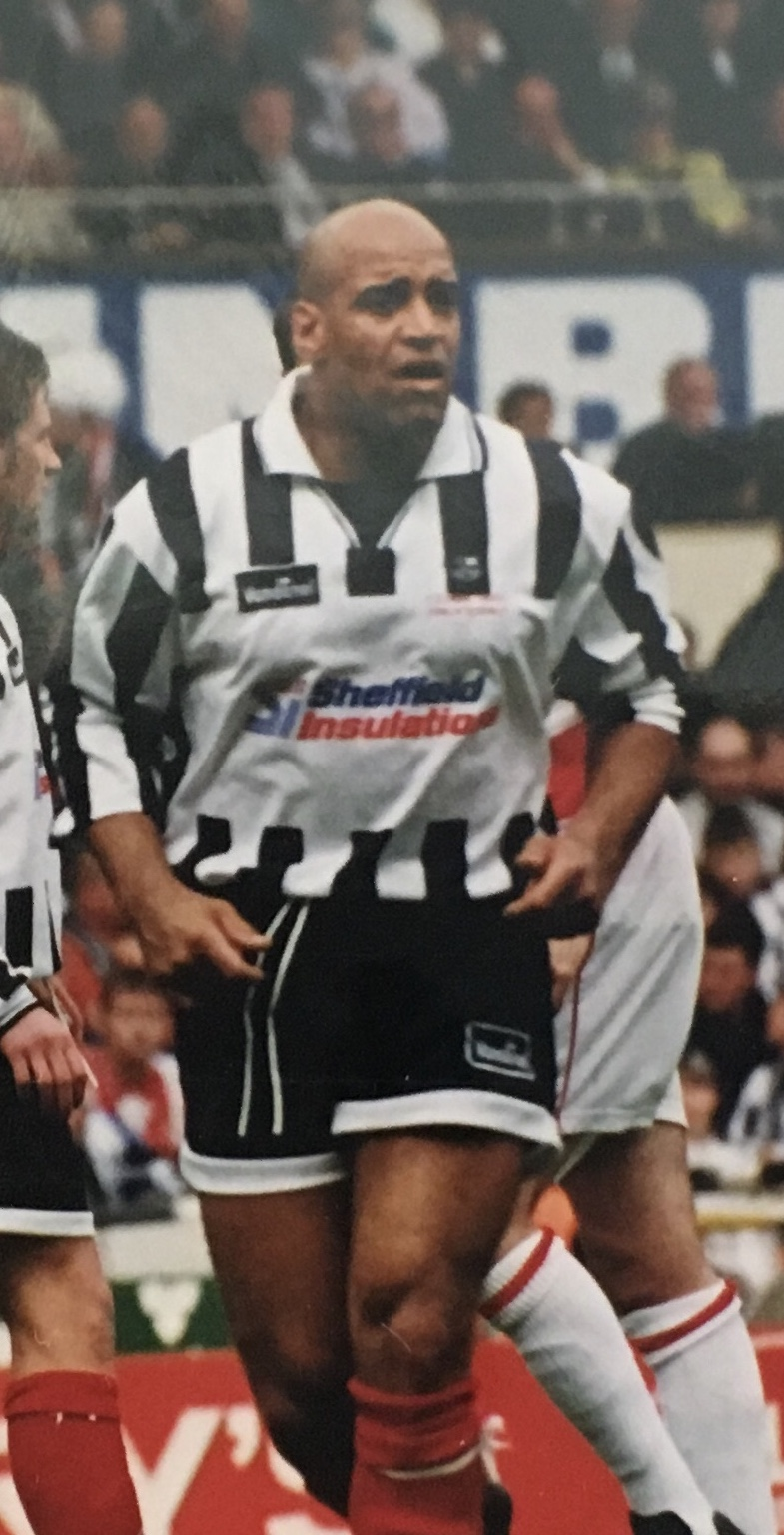

Personal information
- Full name: Danny Bailey
- Date of birth: 21 May 1964 (age 62)
- Place of birth: Leyton, London, England
- Position: Midfielder

Youth career
- ?–1980: AFC Bournemouth

Senior career*
Years	Team	Apps	(Gls)
1980–1981	AFC Bournemouth	2	(0)
1983–1984	Dagenham	3	(0)
1983–1984	Torquay United	1	(0)
1984–?	Grays Athletic		
- Wembley
1987–1989	Wealdstone	12	(0)
1989–1990	Exeter City	64	(2)
1990–1992	Reading	50	(2)
1992	→ Fulham (loan)	3	(0)
1992–1997	Exeter City	152	(4)
1997	Farnborough Town		
1997–1998	Slough Town	40	(0)
1998	Telford United	7	(0)
1998–1999	Forest Green Rovers	29	(0)
1999–2000	Welling United	22	(2)
2000	Forest Green Rovers	7	(0)
2000–2001	Aylesbury United	9	(0)
2001	Grays Athletic		
2001–2002	Weston-super-Mare		
2002	Bath City	6	(0)
2002–2003	Weymouth	20	(1)
2003–2005	Chippenham Town		
2005	Stansted		
2005–2006	Chesham United	9	(0)
- Ware

Managerial career
- 2009–2011: Interwood F.C.
- * Club domestic league appearances and goals as of 20:08, 4 February 2009 (PST)

Danny Stephen Bailey (born 21 May 1964) is an English retired professional footballer.

== Early career ==
He began his career as an apprentice with AFC Bournemouth, turning professional and making his league debut in the 1980–81 season. After one more league appearance for Bournemouth, he dropped out of league football, joining Dagenham.

He later joined Walthamstow Avenue. In March 1984 he left them to join Torquay United on a free transfer. His only league appearance for the Gulls came during the 1983–84 season, a 2–1 defeat away to Hartlepool United on 17 March.

== Later career ==
In 1984, Bailey moved to Grays Athletic. He subsequently joined Wealdstone from Wembley and in August 1989, returned to league football with Exeter City, again on a free transfer.

His career took off, and he quickly established himself in the side. After 64 league games, in which he scored two goals, he moved to Reading in December 1990 for a fee of £50,000 as the first signing under new owner John Madejski. In his first season and a half at Reading, he played 50 league games, scoring twice. However, out of the first team at the beginning of the 1992–93 season, he was loaned to Fulham making three league appearances.

Still unable to break back into the Reading line-up, he returned to Exeter City on a free transfer in December 1992, and quickly re-established himself at St. James Park. In the summer of 1997, he was released after 152 further league appearances in which he scored four goals.

He joined Farnborough Town, beginning a journey around various non-league sides, quickly moving on to Slough Town in the 1997 close season. He remained at Slough until the end of the 1997–98 season, scoring one goal in the FA Trophy, but was one of many players sacked during a summer that saw Slough in deep financial trouble and eventually voted out of the Conference.

He joined Telford United on a short-term contract on 21 August 1998, with the emphasis on the short-term. He moved to Forest Green Rovers in September 1998, playing in the 1999 FA Trophy final, at which time "Non-League on the Net" reported that he was based in London, where he owned his own fitness centre. In the close-season of 1999 he was released by Forest Green, joining Welling United on 29 July 1999.

"The Kentish Times" linked him with moves to Basingstoke Town in December 1999, and Crawley Town in January 2000, however he remained at Welling and was released in the summer of 2000. In September 2000 he returned on a free transfer to play for Forest Green Rovers. In December 2000, he left Forest Green for a second time, moving to Aylesbury United, though he stayed only a few months at Aylesbury, moving to Grays Athletic in February 2001.

He later played for Weston-super-Mare before joining Bath City in March 2002. He was released at the end of the season and joined Redbridge from where he joined Weymouth in November 2002, playing regularly until the end of the season. He was without a club from August 2003 to November 2003 when he joined Chippenham Town.

He later played for Stansted from where he joined Chesham United in December 2005, playing nine times until mid-February.

He later joined Ware.

In March 2008 he was coach at Potters Bar Town.

== Coaching career ==
He and his brother co-founded the Bailey Football Academy in East London. They organized a men's team "Elite" and a women's "International" team. Danny also coached MTG Turkish league team.

== Honours ==
Exeter City

- Football League Fourth Division: 1989–90

Individual

- PFA Team of the Year: 1989–90 Fourth Division
