= Andy Gray (footballer, born 1973) =

English footballer

Personal information
- Full name: Andrew Gray
- Date of birth: 25 October 1973 (age 52)
- Place of birth: Southampton, England
- Height: 5 ft 6 in (1.68 m)
- Position: Forward

Youth career
- Reading

Senior career*
Years	Team	Apps	(Gls)
1992–1994	Reading	17	(3)
1994–1996	Leyton Orient	32	(3)
1996	→ Enfield (loan)	?	(?)
1996	Slough Town	8	(0)
1996–1997	Wokingham Town	?	(?)
2003–2004	Henley Town	?	(?)
- * Club domestic league appearances and goals

Andrew Gray (born 25 October 1973) is an English former professional footballer who played in the Football League, as a forward.

== Biography ==
Born in Southampton, Gray began his career as a trainee at Reading and signed for the club on 3 July 1992. After making seventeen league appearances for Reading, he signed for Leyton Orient on 20 July 1994 on a free transfer. He remained at Orient for two seasons, making 32 league appearances and scoring three goals. He was loaned to non-League Enfield in February 1996, and in March 1996 he was signed by Slough Town for a fee of £5,000. He later played for Wokingham Town and Henley Town
