= Michael Gilkes (footballer) =

Barbadian footballer

Personal information
- Full name: Michael Earl Glenis McDonald Gilkes
- Date of birth: 20 July 1965 (age 61)
- Place of birth: Hackney, England
- Height: 5 ft 8 in (1.73 m)
- Position: Left midfielder

Youth career
- 1983–1984: Leicester City

Senior career*
Years	Team	Apps	(Gls)
1984–1997	Reading	393	(43)
1986	→ Mikkelin Palloilijat (loan)	18	(4)
1992	→ Chelsea (loan)	1	(0)
1992	→ Southampton (loan)	6	(0)
1997–1999	Wolverhampton Wanderers	38	(1)
1999–2001	Millwall	32	(2)
2001–2003	Slough Town	83	(11)

International career
2000	Barbados	5	(0)

Managerial career
- 2015–2016: Basingstoke Town
- 2022: Reading (interim)
- * Club domestic league appearances and goals

Michael Earl Glenis McDonald Gilkes (born 20 July 1965) is an English professional football coach and former player who was recently interim manager of Championship club Reading, where he is currently the manager of the club's academy. Gilkes played as a left winger from 1984 until 2003, most notably for Reading, and was also a Barbados international.

== Playing career ==
Gilkes played more than 550 times as a professional and made his name with the Reading side that nearly won promotion to the Premier League in the early 1990s. Gilkes made over 400 appearances in all competitions for the club as they went from the old Fourth Division to the very edge of the top flight. They finished second in the new Division One in 1995 (only missing out on automatic promotion due to the streamlining of the FA Premier League from 22 clubs to 20) and reached the playoff final, holding a 2–0 lead until the 75th minute before losing 4–3 in extra time to Bolton Wanderers.

On 2 March 1988, Gilkes scored during extra time of the Full Members' Cup semi-final against Coventry City. The game had been delayed due to crowd congestion, and the goal – timed at 10:38 pm – broke the record for the latest goal in British professional football. He went on to score Reading's first goal in the final on 27 March 1988, where they beat Luton Town 4–1.

Gilkes spent nearly thirteen years with the Royals, scoring 52 goals, before he was sold to Wolves in March 1997, managed by Mark McGhee who had departed from Reading to Leicester 16 months earlier.

His time with Wolves was less successful than it was at Reading, scoring just once in 38 league appearances, though he did come close to reaching the Premier League with them just as he had done at Reading. He joined Wolves just weeks before the end of the 1996–97 season, as they were edged out of the automatic promotion places to Barnsley and lost to Crystal Palace in the playoffs. A year later they finished ninth, missing out on the playoffs, but enjoyed a run to the FA Cup semi finals where they narrowly lost to Arsenal. Gilkes spent two seasons at Wolves before manager Keith Stevens signed him for Millwall.

In a vote to compile Reading's best-ever eleven, Gilkes was voted the best left-winger with 80.6% of the vote. Gilkes played at the Madejski Stadium in the Royals Legends game on 1 May 2006.

== Later career ==
Gilkes was head coach of Southern League Division One South & West side Hungerford Town until November 2012, when he was appointed assistant manager at Conference South side Basingstoke Town. In November 2015, Gilkes was appointed first team manager for the remainder of the 2015–16 season, after Jason Bristow agreed to step down from the position, with Basingstoke Town at the bottom of the Conference South. Gilkes was sacked as Basingstoke manager in March 2016 and took a role at the Reading FC Academy. On 1 September 2017, Gilkes was promoted to first team coach at Reading, and on 19 February 2022 he was appointed interim team manager, alongside Paul Ince.

In May 2022, Gilkes reverted to his role as the Academy Manager following the full-time appointment of Ince and his own coaching team.

== Honours ==
Reading

- Football League Second Division: 1993–94
- Full Members' Cup: 1987–88
