= List of Reading F.C. players =

This is a list footballers who have played 100 times or more for Reading Football Club.

== Key ==
- The list is sorted by the year the player joined the club. If more than one player joined in the same year then they are sorted alphabetically.

Club years

- Counted as the years the player signed for, and left the club.

Appearances and goals

- League and total appearances prior to the Second World War are sourced to Joyce (2004), from 1946–47 to 1989–90 to the Post War English & Scottish Football League A–Z Players Database, from 1990–91 to 1995–96 to Royals Record, and for the 1996–97 season onwards to Soccerbase. Reading's top 10 all time appearances makers and goalscorers are listed on the club's official website, while statistics of selected players from all era's are also available at the Reading F.C. Former Players' Association.

Academy graduate
Current Reading player
Current Reading player and academy graduate

International career

- Players who made international appearances only have the highest level at which they played listed.
- A player's senior international team is sourced to National Football Teams whilst appearances at age group level are sourced to the Association of Football Statisticians. Players not covered by the above are sourced as needed in the "Refs" column.

== Players with 100 or more appearances ==
As of match played 14 November 2026
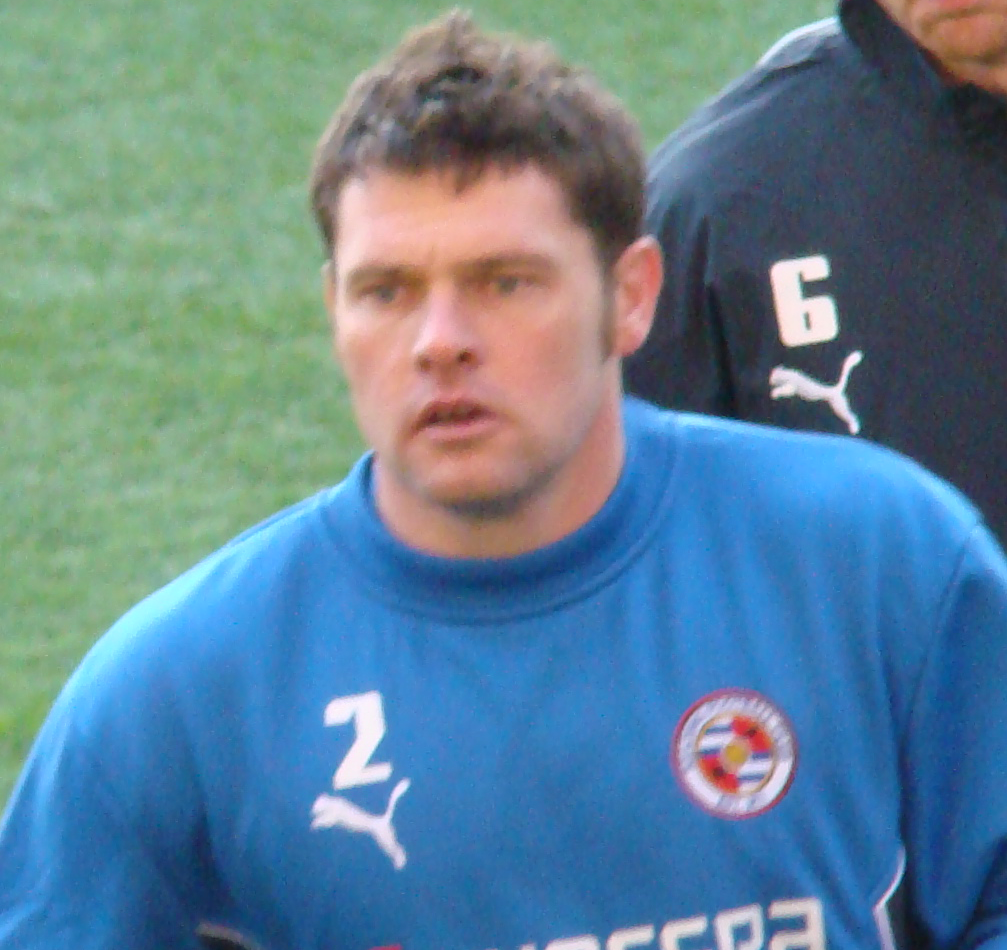
Graeme Murty spent eleven years at the club and captained the side to the Championship title in 2006.

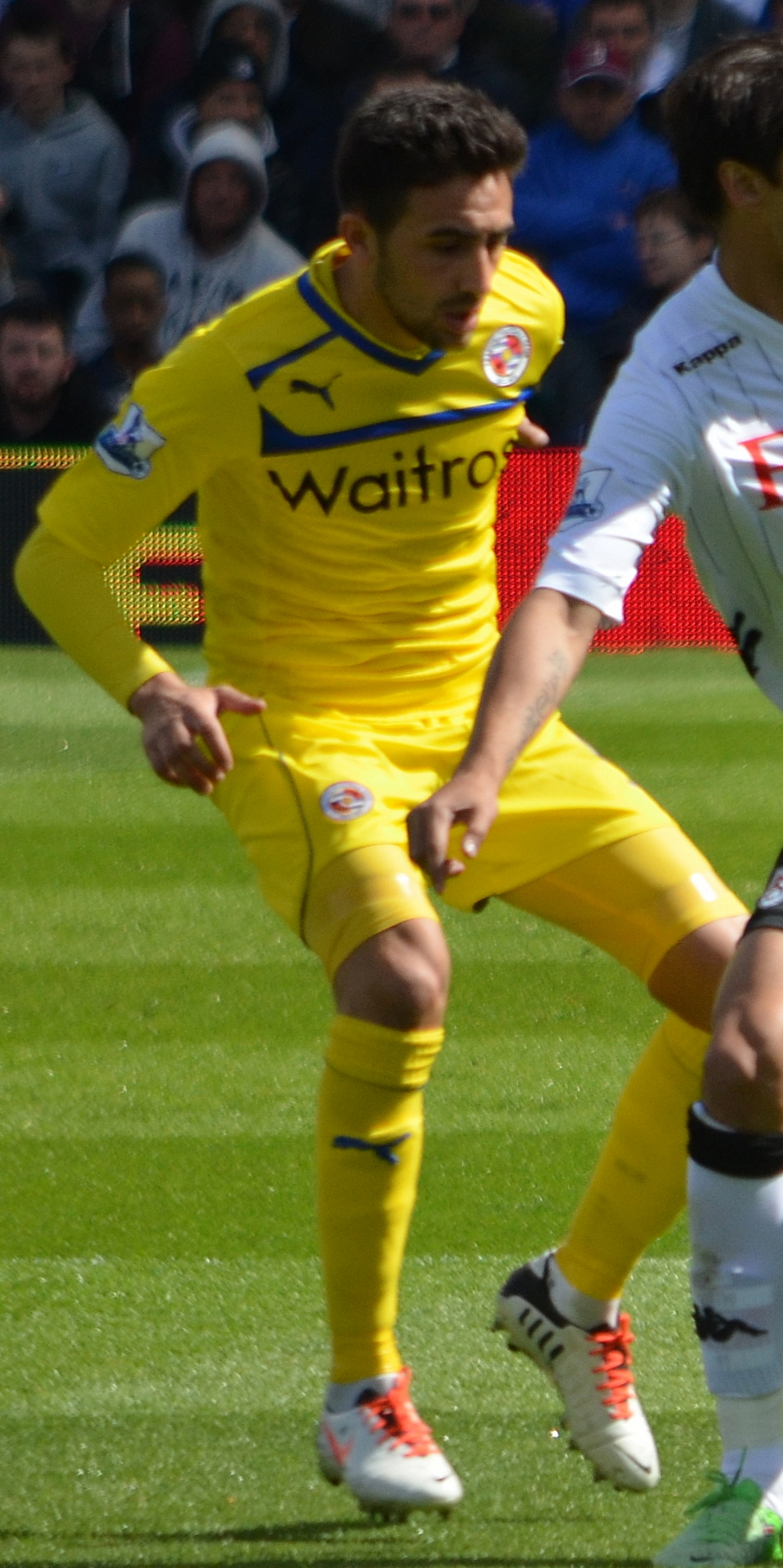
A graduate of Reading's Academy, Jem Karacan made more than 160 appearances for the club, making his debut in 2008 before leaving for Galatasaray in 2015.

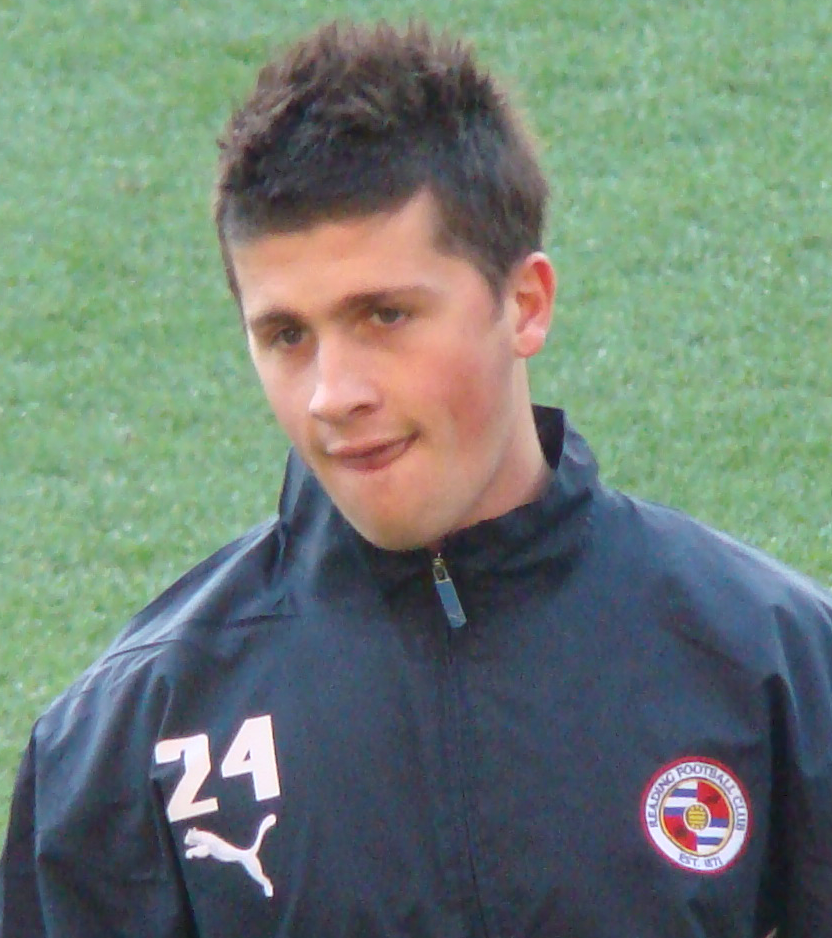
Signed in 2005 for £30,000, Shane Long scored 54 goals in six seasons before joining West Bromwich Albion for £6m.

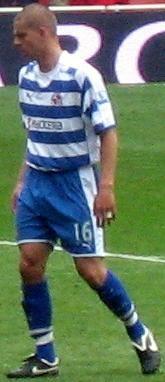
Ívar Ingimarsson was a regular during Reading's most successful period, starting every league game of the Championship winning campaign and first Premier League season.

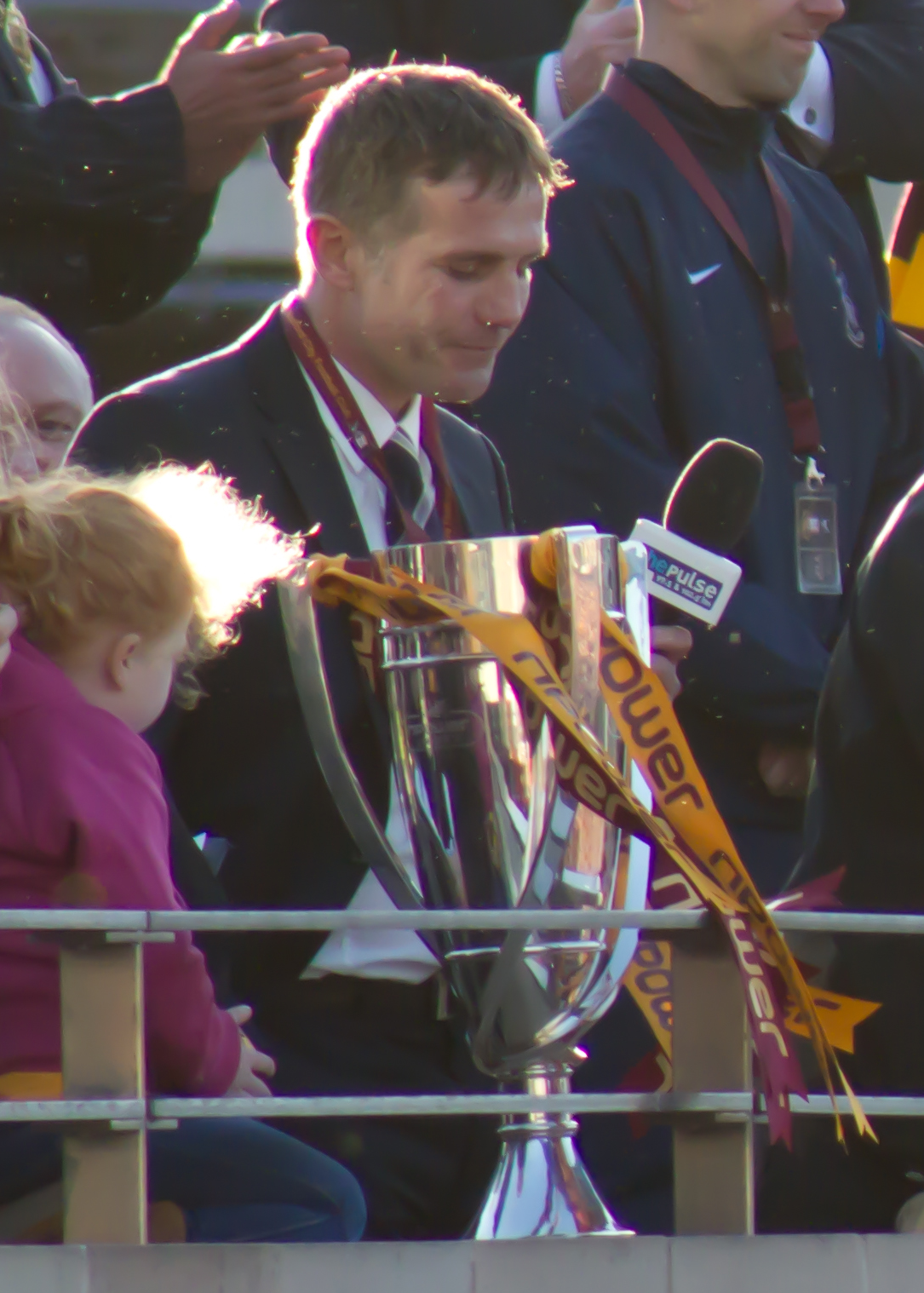
Phil Parkinson made over 400 appearances in an eleven year career with Reading and twice won the club's Player of the Season award.

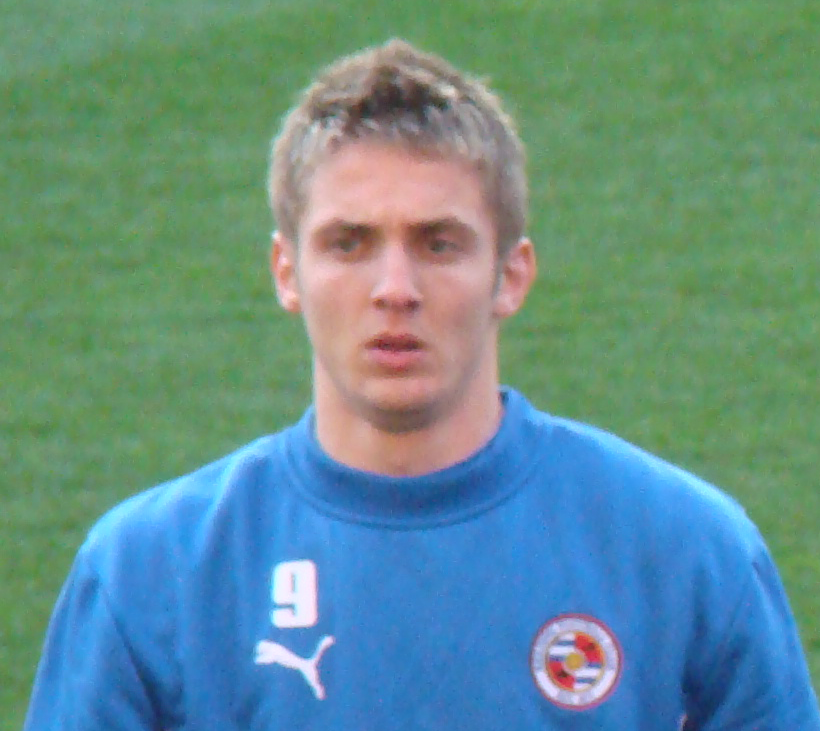
Kevin Doyle made 26 appearances for the Republic of Ireland during his time at Reading, making him the club's most capped player.

Name	Years	League apps	League goals	Cup apps	Cup goals	League Cup apps	League Cup goals	EFL Trophy apps	EFL Trophy goals	Other apps (Note: Includes Promotion play-offs)	Other goals	Total apps	Total goals	International Career
Joe Bailey	????–1921	186	75									186+	75+	-
Joe Duckworth	1924?–1930?	202	0									202+	0	-
Albert Hayhurst	1933–1938	237	12									237+	12+	-
Billy Wright	1933–1938	?	?									193	5	-
Tommy Tait	1934–1939	144	79									144+	103	-
Jimmy Wheeler	1948–1964	406	147									453	168	-
Eddie McLaren	1952–1959	184	2									207	3	-
Ray Reeves	1952–1961	284	28									317	32	-
Maurice Evans	1955–1967	407	13									459	16	-
Dennis Allen	1961–1970	336	85									377	95	-
Colin Meldrum	1962–1970	266	8									304	9	-
Les Chappell	1969–1974	201	78									241	90	-
Gordon Cumming	1969–1977	295	51									331	61	-
Steve Death	1969–1982	471	0									537	0	-
Robin Friday	1973–1976	121	46									121+	53	-
Ray Hiron	1975–1978	92	14									106	14	-
Gary Peters	1975–1979, 1985–1988	256	10									294	12	-
Paul Bennett	1976–1979	105	3									124	3	-
Richie Bowman	1976–1980	194	30									194+	30+	-
Mark White	1976–1988	278	11									320	13	-
Jerry Williams	1976–1988	309	17									357	17+	-
Pat Earles	1977–1982	247	68									284	85	-
Alan Lewis	1977–1982	149	5									173	7	-
Martin Hicks	1978–1991	500	23									603	26	-
Mike Kearney	1978–1983	145	36									145+	36+	-
Lawrie Sanchez	1978–1984	262	28									305	31	Northern Ireland
Steve Wood	1979–1987	219	9									251	9	-
Stuart Beavon	1980–1990	396	44									481	55	-
Kerry Dixon	1980–1983	116	51									133	57	England
Steve Richardson	1982–1993	380	3									457	3	-
Trevor Senior	1983–1987, 1988–1992	301	153									362	191	-
Michael Gilkes	1984–1997	393	43									486	52	Barbados
Steve Francis	1987–1993	216	0									259	0	-
Linden Jones	1987–1992	152	8									190	14	Wales
Steve Moran	1987–1991	116	30									143	38	England U21
Mick Tait	1987–1990	99	9									133	14	-
Mick Gooding (Note: Joint player-manager 1994–1997.)	1989–1997	314	26									368	30	-
Scott Taylor	1989–1995	207	24									248	29	-
Ady Williams	1989–1996, 2000–2004	335	18									396	23	Wales
Stuart Lovell	1990–1998	227	58	16	2	13	5	7	0	3	2	266	67	Australia
Keith McPherson	1990–1999	271	8									316	9	-
Kevin Dillon	1991–1994	101	4									119	5	England U21
Shaka Hislop	1992–1995	104	0	3	0	10	0	6	0	3	0	126	0	Trinidad and Tobago
Jeff Hopkins	1992–1997	131	3									156	4	Wales
Jamie Lambert	1992–1999	124	16									151	20	-
Phil Parkinson	1992–2003	362	20									425	24	-
Jimmy Quinn	1992–1997	182	71									216	95	Northern Ireland
Dylan Kerr	1993–1996	89	5									104	5	-
Andy Bernal	1994–2000	187	2									224	4	Australia
Lee Nogan	1995–1997	91	26									102	29	Wales
Martin Williams	1995–2000	127	26									156	29	-
Darren Caskey	1996–2001	203	35									232	45	England U19
Barry Hunter	1996–2001	86	4									100	6	Northern Ireland
Scott Howie	1997–2001	85	0	4	0	6	0	7	0	-	-	102	0	Scotland U21
Linvoy Primus	1997–2000	94	1	6	0	9	0	4	0	-	-	113	1	-
Jim McIntyre	1998–2001	97	14	5	1	3	0	5	1	3	2	113	16	-
Graeme Murty (Note: Club captain 2003–2009.)	1998–2009	306	2	16	0	9	0	-	-	8	0	339	2	Scotland
Nicky Forster	1999–2005	187	59	8	2	11	4	-	-	9	2	215	67	England U21
Phil Whitehead	1999–2003	94	0	6	0	5	0	-	-	3	2	108	0	-
Martin Butler	2000–2003	103	32	5	2	5	0	2	0	3	2	117	36	-
Jamie Cureton	2000–2003	108	50	7	2	5	1	2	1	5	1	127	55	England U18
Sammy Igoe	2000–2003	87	7	6	0	5	0	4	0	3	0	105	7	-
Ricky Newman	2000–2005	121	1	7	1	6	0	1	0	2	0	137	2	-
Marcus Hahnemann	2001–2009	282	0	7	0	10	0	0	0	4	0	303	0	United States
James Harper	2001–2010	312	25	13	0	17	1	2	0	4	0	348	26	-
Andrew Hughes	2001–2005	166	18	7	0	7	0	1	0	2	0	183	18	-
John Salako	2001–2004	111	13	4	0	5	1	1	0	0	0	121	14	England
Nicky Shorey	2001–2008, 2012–2013	284	12	15	0	14	1	-	-	4	0	317	13	England
Ivar Ingimarsson (Note: Club captain 2009–2011.)	2003–2011	251	11	18	1	12	0	-	-	0	0	281	12	Iceland
Dave Kitson	2003–2008, 2009	145	56	6	2	5	4	-	-	2	0	158	62	-
Glen Little	2003–2008, 2009	112	6	6	0	5	0	-	-	2	0	123	6	-
Steve Sidwell	2003–2007	168	29	10	0	7	1	-	-	2	0	187	30	England U21
Bobby Convey	2004–2009	98	7	8	0	6	1	-	-	-	-	112	8	United States
Ibrahima Sonko	2004–2008	127	8	5	0	4	0	-	-	-	-	135	8	Senegal
Kevin Doyle	2005–2009	154	55	4	1	4	1	-	-	1	0	163	56	Republic of Ireland
Adam Federici	2005–2015	209	1	25	0	11	0	-	-	3	0	248	1	Australia
Brynjar Gunnarsson	2005–2013	142	9	13	1	6	0	-	-	2	0	163	10	Iceland
Stephen Hunt	2005–2009	155	17	7	3	9	1	-	-	1	0	172	21	Republic of Ireland
Leroy Lita	2005–2009	83	20	9	7	8	5	-	-	-	-	100	32	England U21
Shane Long	2005–2011, 2022–2023	204	45	19	8	7	1	-	-	5	2	235	56	Republic of Ireland
Alex Pearce	2006–2015	212	14	15	0	12	1	-	-	1	0	240	15	Republic of Ireland
Simon Church	2007–2013	104	22	12	2	3	0	-	-	3	0	122	24	Wales
Jem Karacan (Note: Club captain 2014–2015.)	2007–2015	155	11	12	0	5	1	-	-	3	0	175	12	Turkey A2
Hal Robson-Kanu	2007–2016	198	24	20	5	8	1	-	-	2	0	228	30	Wales
Noel Hunt	2008–2013	145	33	6	3	8	3	-	-	3	0	162	39	Republic of Ireland
Jimmy Kébé	2008–2013	175	29	9	2	3	0	-	-	3	0	190	31	Mali
Jobi McAnuff (Note: Club captain 2011–2014.)	2009–2014	189	14	11	1	3	0	-	-	3	1	206	16	Jamaica
Jay Tabb	2009–2013	89	0	7	0	6	0	-	-	3	0	105	0	Republic of Ireland U21
Mikele Leigertwood	2010–2014	97	7	7	2	2	1	-	-	3	0	109	10	Antigua and Barbuda
Jordan Obita	2010–2020	163	5	15	1	11	0	-	-	2	1	191	7	England U21
Adam Le Fondre	2011–2014	104	39	5	2	1	0	-	-	-	-	110	41	-
Chris Gunter	2012–2020	280	2	16	0	15	2	-	-	3	0	314	4	Wales
Garath McCleary	2012–2020	242	23	19	3	7	1	-	-	2	0	270	27	Jamaica
Pavel Pogrebnyak	2012–2015	94	24	6	0	3	2	-	-	-	-	103	26	Russia
Danny Williams	2013–2017	135	13	12	1	6	0	-	-	3	0	156	14	United States
Paul McShane (Note: Club captain 2015–2019.)	2015–2019	96	3	4	1	2	0	-	-	1	0	103	4	Republic of Ireland
Liam Moore (Note: Club captain 2019–2022.)	2016–2023	219	8	3	0	9	0	-	-	3	0	233	8	Jamaica
John Swift	2016–2022	187	32	5	0	7	2	-	-	3	0	202	33	England U21
Tyler Blackett	2016–2020	110	0	3	0	6	0	-	-	3	0	122	0	England U21
Yakou Méïté	2016–2023	156	42	4	2	5	3	-	-	0	0	165	47	Ivory Coast
Andy Rinomhota	2018–2022, 2025–Present	141	3	8	1	8	0	0	0	-	-	157	4	Zimbabwe
Omar Richards	2017–2021	93	2	7	1	5	0	-	-	-	-	104	3	England U21
Sone Aluko	2017–2021	93	6	7	0	2	0	-	-	-	-	102	6	Nigeria
Andy Yiadom (Note: Club captain 2022–2025.)	2018–2026	244	4	4	0	3	0	2	0	-	-	253	4	Ghana
Ovie Ejaria	2019, 2019–2020, 2020–2023	124	9	1	0	2	0	-	-	-	-	127	9	England U21
Michael Morrison	2019–2022	108	8	2	0	3	0	-	-	-	-	113	8	-
Lucas João	2019–2023	116	42	2	0	1	3	-	-	-	-	119	45	Portugal; Angola
Tom Holmes	2016–2024, 2024	125	1	3	0	3	0	2	0	-	-	133	1	-
Tom McIntyre	2016–2024	105	6	5	0	6	0	4	1	-	-	120	7	Scotland U21
Amadou Mbengue	2022–2023, 2023–2025	97	2	4	1	3	0	5	0	-	-	109	3	Senegal U23
Harvey Knibbs	2023–2025	88	25	4	1	3	0	5	6	-	-	100	32	-
Lewis Wing (Note: Club captain 2025–Present.)	2023–Present	149	30	5	3	4	1	5	0	-	-	163	34	—
Charlie Savage	2023–Present	139	10	6	2	8	2	6	1	-	-	159	15	Wales
Kelvin Ehibhatiomhan	2021–2026	123	19	3	1	7	5	6	2	-	-	139	27	-
Joel Pereira	2023–Present	107	0	3	0	3	0	3	0	-	-	116	0	Portugal U21
