= Reading F.C. Player of the Season =

English football club award

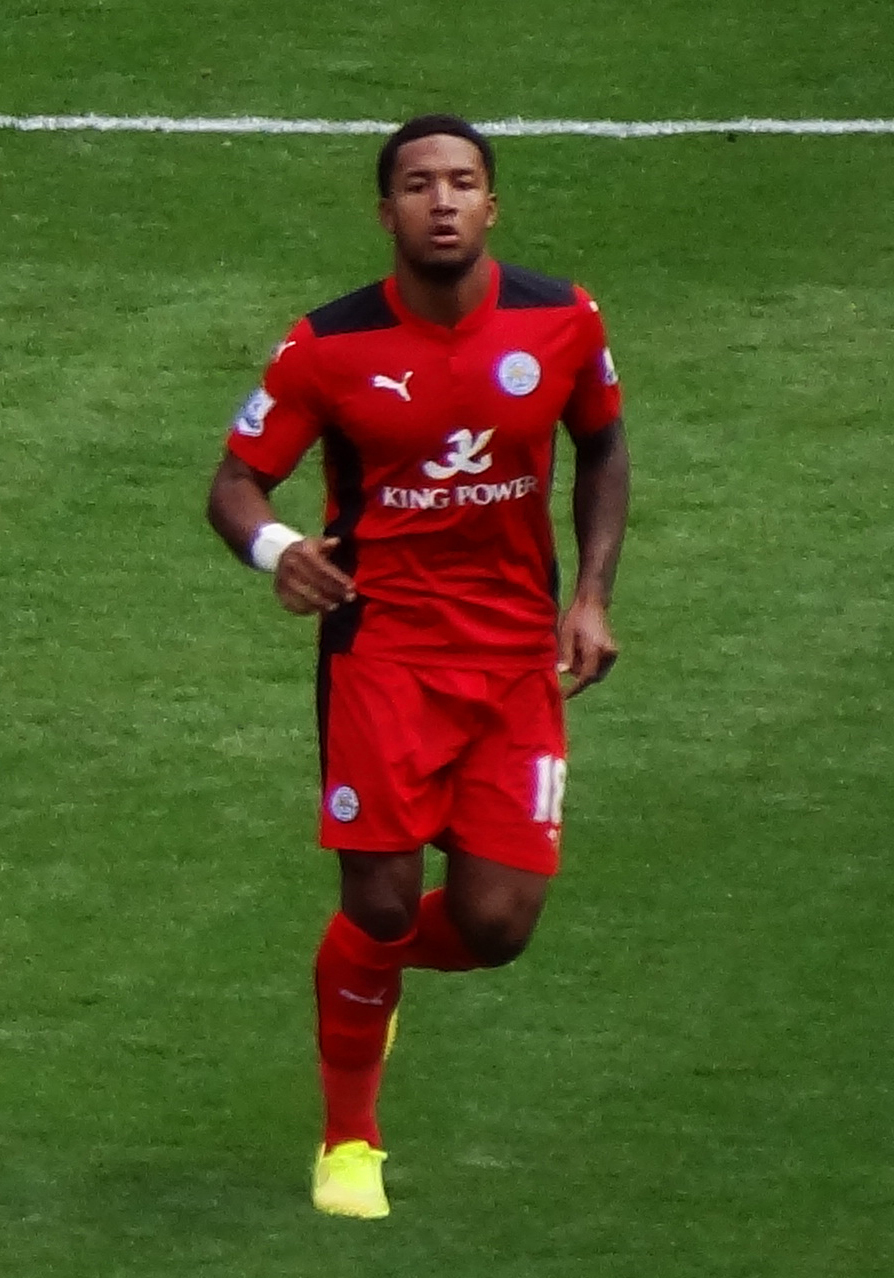
Liam Moore, the 2017-18 recipient of the award.

Reading Football Club are an English football club, from Reading, Berkshire. Established in 1871, the club is one of the oldest teams in England, but did not join The Football League until 1920, and had never played in the top tier of English football league system before the 2006–07 season.

== Winners ==
| Season | Name | Nationality | Position | Notes | Ref |
|---|---|---|---|---|---|
| 1963–64 | Colin Meldrum | Scotland | Defender | | |
| 1964–65 | Colin Meldrum | Scotland | Defender | First player to win the award in consecutive years | |
| 1965–66 | Jimmy Wheeler | England | Forward | | |
| 1966–67 | George Harris | England | Midfielder | | |
| 1967–68 | Mike Dixon | England | Goalkeeper | | |
| 1968–69 | Peter Silvester | England | Forward | | |
| 1969–70 | Steve Death | England | Goalkeeper | (England) Dennis Allen second; (England) Tony Wagstaff third. | |
| 1970–71 | Terry Bell | England | Forward | | |
| 1971–72 | Gordon Cumming | Scotland | Midfielder | | |
| 1972–73 | Steve Death | England | Goalkeeper | | |
| 1973–74 | Steve Death | England | Goalkeeper | | |
| 1974–75 | Robin Friday | England | Forward | | |
| 1975–76 | Robin Friday | England | Forward | | |
| 1976–77 | Steve Death | England | Goalkeeper | | |
| 1977–78 | Richie Bowman | England | Midfielder | | |
| 1978–79 | Richie Bowman | England | Midfielder | | |
| 1979–80 | Mark White | England | Defender | | |
| 1980–81 | Steve Hetzke | England | Defender | | |
| 1981–82 | Jerry Williams | England | Midfielder | | |
| 1982–83 | Steve Richardson | England | Defender | | |
| 1983–84 | Steve Richardson | England | Defender | | |
| 1984–85 | Steve Wood | England | Defender | | |
| 1985–86 | Steve Wood | England | Defender | | |
| 1986–87 | Kevin Bremner | Scotland | Forward | | |
| 1987–88 | Steve Francis | England | Goalkeeper | | |
| 1988–89 | Trevor Senior | England | Forward | | |
| 1989–90 | Martin Hicks | England | Defender | | |
| 1990–91 | Keith McPherson | England | Defender | | |
| 1991–92 | Mick Gooding | England | Midfielder | | |
| 1992–93 | Mick Gooding | England | Midfielder | | |
| 1993–94 | Dylan Kerr | Malta | Defender | | |
| 1994–95 | Shaka Hislop | Trinidad and Tobago | Goalkeeper | First winner from outside Europe | |
| 1995–96 | Mick Gooding | England | Midfielder | | |
| 1996–97 | Trevor Morley | England | Forward | | |
| 1997–98 | Phil Parkinson | England | Midfielder | | |
| 1998–99 | Phil Parkinson | England | Midfielder | | |
| 1999–2000 | Darren Caskey | England | Midfielder | | |
| 2000–01 | Martin Butler | England | Forward | | |
| 2001–02 | Graeme Murty | Scotland | Defender | | |
| 2002–03 | James Harper | England | Midfielder | | |
| 2003–04 | Graeme Murty | Scotland | Defender | | |
| 2004–05 | Dave Kitson | England | Forward | (Iceland) Ivar Ingimarsson and (United States) Marcus Hahnemann shortlisted. | |
| 2005–06 | Kevin Doyle | Republic of Ireland | Forward | (United States) Bobby Convey and (England) Glen Little shortlisted. | |
| 2006–07 | Ivar Ingimarsson | Iceland | Defender | (Republic of Ireland) Stephen Hunt and (England) Nicky Shorey shortlisted. | |
| 2007–08 | Stephen Hunt | Republic of Ireland | Midfielder | (United States) Marcus Hahnemann and (England) James Harper shortlisted. | |
| 2008–09 | Chris Armstrong | Scotland | Defender | (Republic of Ireland) Kevin Doyle and (Republic of Ireland) Noel Hunt shortlisted. | |
| 2009–10 | Gylfi Sigurðsson | Iceland | Midfielder | (England) Ryan Bertrand and (Mali) Jimmy Kébé shortlisted. | |
| 2010–11 | Shane Long | Republic of Ireland | Forward | (Mali) Jimmy Kébé second; (Turkey) Jem Karacan third. | |
| 2011–12 | Alex Pearce | Republic of Ireland | Defender | (Turkey) Jem Karacan second; (Australia) Adam Federici third. | |
| 2012–13 | Adam Le Fondre | England | Forward | (England) Alex McCarthy second; (Wales) Hal Robson-Kanu third. | |
| 2013–14 | Jordan Obita | England | Midfielder | (Wales) Chris Gunter second; (United States) Danny Williams third. | |
| 2014–15 | Adam Federici | Australia | Goalkeeper | (Scotland) Jamie Mackie and (Jamaica) Michael Hector shortlisted. | |
| 2015–16 | Ali Al-Habsi | Oman | Goalkeeper | (Republic of Ireland) Paul McShane and (England) Oliver Norwood shortlisted. | |
| 2016–17 | Ali Al-Habsi | Oman | Goalkeeper | (France) Yann Kermorgant and (England) Liam Moore shortlisted. | |
| 2017–18 | Liam Moore | England | Defender | (The Gambia) Modou Barrow second; (Republic of Ireland) Liam Kelly third. | |
| 2018–19 | Andy Rinomhota | England | Midfielder | (Ghana) Andy Yiadom second; (Ivory Coast) Yakou Méïté third. | |
| 2019–20 | Rafael Cabral | Brazil | Goalkeeper | | |
| 2020–21 | Josh Laurent | England | Midfielder | | |
| 2021–22 | Andy Yiadom | Ghana | Defender | | |
| 2022–23 | Tom Ince | England | Forward | (England) Joe Lumley second; (England) Andy Carroll third. | |
| 2023–24 | Lewis Wing | England | Midfielder | (New Zealand) Tyler Bindon second; (England) Harvey Knibbs third. | |
| 2024–25 | Tyler Bindon | New Zealand | Defender | (Portugal) Joel Pereira second; (England) Harvey Knibbs third. | |
| 2025–26 | Jack Marriott | England | Forward | (England) Lewis Wing second; (Portugal) Joel Pereira third. | |

=== Wins by player ===
| Winner | Total wins | Season(s) |
|---|---|---|
| (England) Steve Death | 4 | 1969–70, 1972–73, 1973–74, 1976–77 |
| (England) Mick Gooding | 3 | 1991–92, 1992–93, 1995–96 |
| (Scotland) Colin Meldrum | 2 | 1963–64, 1964–65 |
| (England) Robin Friday | 2 | 1974–75, 1975–76 |
| (England) Richie Bowman | 2 | 1977–78, 1978–79 |
| (England) Steve Richardson | 2 | 1982–83, 1983–84 |
| (England) Steve Wood | 2 | 1984–85, 1985–86 |
| (England) Phil Parkinson | 2 | 1997–98, 1998–99 |
| (Scotland) Graeme Murty | 2 | 2001–02, 2003–04 |
| (Oman) Ali Al-Habsi | 2 | 2015–16, 2016–17 |
| (England) Jimmy Wheeler | 1 | 1965–66 |
| (England) George Harris | 1 | 1966–67 |
| (England) Mike Dixon | 1 | 1967–68 |
| (England) Peter Silvester | 1 | 1968–69 |
| (England) Terry Bell | 1 | 1970–71 |
| (Scotland) Gordon Cumming | 1 | 1971–72 |
| (England) Mark White | 1 | 1979–80 |
| (England) Steve Hetzke | 1 | 1980–81 |
| (England) Jerry Williams | 1 | 1981–82 |
| (Scotland) Kevin Bremner | 1 | 1986–87 |
| (England) Steve Francis | 1 | 1987–88 |
| (England) Trevor Senior | 1 | 1988–89 |
| (England) Martin Hicks | 1 | 1989–90 |
| (England) Keith McPherson | 1 | 1990–91 |
| (Malta) Dylan Kerr | 1 | 1993–94 |
| (Trinidad and Tobago) Shaka Hislop | 1 | 1994–95 |
| (England) Trevor Morley | 1 | 1996–97 |
| (England) Darren Caskey | 1 | 1999–00 |
| (England) Martin Butler | 1 | 2000–01 |
| (England) James Harper | 1 | 2002–03 |
| (England) Dave Kitson | 1 | 2004–05 |
| (Republic of Ireland) Kevin Doyle | 1 | 2005–06 |
| (Iceland) Ivar Ingimarsson | 1 | 2006–07 |
| (Republic of Ireland) Stephen Hunt | 1 | 2007–08 |
| (Scotland) Chris Armstrong | 1 | 2008–09 |
| (Iceland) Gylfi Sigurðsson | 1 | 2009–10 |
| (Republic of Ireland) Shane Long | 1 | 2010–11 |
| (Republic of Ireland) Alex Pearce | 1 | 2011–12 |
| (England) Adam Le Fondre | 1 | 2012–13 |
| (England) Jordan Obita | 1 | 2013–14 |
| (Australia) Adam Federici | 1 | 2014–15 |
| (England) Liam Moore | 1 | 2017–18 |
| (England) Andy Rinomhota | 1 | 2018–19 |
| (Brazil) Rafael Cabral | 1 | 2019–20 |
| (England) Josh Laurent | 1 | 2020–21 |
| (Ghana) Andy Yiadom | 1 | 2021–22 |
| (England) Tom Ince | 1 | 2022–23 |
| (England) Lewis Wing | 1 | 2023–24 |
| (New Zealand) Tyler Bindon | 1 | 2024–25 |
| (England) Jack Marriott | 1 | 2025–26 |

=== Wins by playing position ===
| Position | Number of wins |
|---|---|
| Defender | 19 |
| Midfielder | 16 |
| Forward | 15 |
| Goalkeeper | 11 |

=== Wins by nationality ===
| Nationality | Total winners | Unique winners |
|---|---|---|
| England | 42 | 32 |
| Scotland | 7 | 5 |
| Republic of Ireland | 4 | 4 |
| Iceland | 2 | 2 |
| Oman | 2 | 1 |
| Trinidad and Tobago | 1 | 1 |
| Australia | 1 | 1 |
| Brazil | 1 | 1 |
| Ghana | 1 | 1 |
| Malta | 1 | 1 |
| New Zealand | 1 | 1 |
