= 1985–86 Reading F.C. season =

Reading
1985–86 season
- Manager: Ian Branfoot
- Football League Third Division: 1st
- FA Cup: Fourth round
- League Cup: First round
- Associate Members Cup: First round
- Top goalscorer: League: Trevor Senior (27); All: Trevor Senior (31)
Home colours

During the 1985–86 English football season, Reading F.C. competed in the Football League Third Division where they finished in 1st position with 94 points. Reading set a new league record during the season for the most consecutive wins from the start of a season (13).

== Squad ==
Note: Flags indicate national team as defined under FIFA eligibility rules; some limited exceptions apply. Players may hold more than one non-FIFA nationality.

Pos.	Nation	Player
GK	ENG	Gary Westwood
DF	ENG	Steve Wood
DF	WAL	Nigel Stevenson
DF	ENG	Steve Richardson
DF	ENG	Brian Roberts
DF	ENG	Gary Peters
DF	ENG	Martin Hicks
DF	ENG	Glenn Burvill
MF	NIR	Colin Bailie
MF	ENG	Jerry Williams
MF	ENG	Mark White

Pos.	Nation	Player
MF	ENG	Andy Rogers
MF	ENG	Sean Reck
MF	ENG	Nick Platnauer
MF	ENG	Deane Foster
MF	ENG	Terry Hurlock
MF	ENG	Michael Gilkes
MF	ENG	Stuart Beavon
FW	SCO	Kevin Bremner
FW	ENG	Dean Horrix
FW	ENG	Trevor Senior

== Results ==
Reading's score comes first

=== Legend ===
Win	Draw	Loss

=== Football League Division Three ===
Match	Date	Opponent	Venue	Result	Scorers
1	17 August 1985	Blackpool	H	1–0	Williams
2	24 August 1985	Plymouth Argyle	A	1–0	Senior
3	26 August 1985	Bristol Rovers	H	3–2	Bater (o.g.), Hicks, Horrix
4	31 August 1985	Cardiff City	A	3–1	Senior (3)
5	7 September 1985	Walsall	H	2–1	Brazier (o.g.), Senior
6	14 September 1985	Rotherham United	A	2–1	Rogers, White
7	17 September 1985	Brentford	A	2–1	Peters, Senior
8	21 September 1985	Swansea City	H	2–0	Horrix, Senior
9	28 September 1985	Doncaster Rovers	A	1–0	White
10	2 October 1985	Chesterfield	H	4–2	Senior (3), Williams
11	5 October 1985	Bolton Wanderers	H	1–0	Wood
12	12 October 1985	Newport County	A	2–0	Beavon, Bremner
13	19 October 1985	Lincoln City	A	1–0	Senior
14	23 October 1985	Wolverhampton Wanderers	H	2–2	Bremner, Senior
15	26 October 1985	Bury	A	1–3	Rogers
16	2 November 1985	Wigan Athletic	H	1–0	Williams
17	6 November 1985	Notts County	H	3–1	Bremner (2), Senior
18	9 November 1985	York City	A	1–0	Bremner
19	23 November 1985	Darlington	H	0–2	
20	30 November 1985	Derby County	A	1–1	Gilkes
21	14 December 1985	Bristol City	H	1–0	Gilkes
22	21 December 1985	Plymouth Argyle	H	4–3	Horrix (pen), Senior (2), Bremner
23	26 December 1985	Bournemouth	A	1–0	Horrix
24	28 December 1985	Bristol Rovers	A	2–0	Senior, Rogers
25	1 January 1986	Gillingham	H	1–2	Horrix
26	11 January 1986	Cardiff City	H	1–1	Bremner
27	18 January 1986	Blackpool	A	0–0	
28	1 February 1986	Walsall	A	0–6	
29	22 February 1986	Swansea City	A	3–2	Senior, Beavon (2)
30	4 March 1986	Chesterfield	A	4–3	Senior (2), Peters, Williams
31	8 March 1986	Bolton Wanderers	A	0–2	
32	12 March 1986	Lincoln City	H	0–2	
33	15 March 1986	Newport County	H	2–0	Wood, Hicks
34	19 March 1986	Rotherham United	H	2–1	Wood, Senior
35	22 March 1986	Bury	H	2–0	Senior, Horrix
36	29 March 1986	Gillingham	A	0–3	
37	31 March 1986	Bournemouth	H	1–2	Senior
38	5 April 1986	Notts County	A	0–0	
39	8 April 1986	Wolverhampton Wanderers	A	3–2	Rogers (2), White
40	12 April 1986	York City	H	0–0	
41	16 April 1986	Brentford	H	3–1	Senior (2), Wood
42	19 April 1986	Darlington	A	0–0	
43	22 April 1986	Wigan Athletic	A	0–1	
44	26 April 1986	Derby County	H	1–0	Senior
45	3 May 1986	Bristol City	A	0–3	
46	5 May 1986	Doncaster Rovers	H	2–0	Senior (2)

==== Table ====
Pos	Team	Pld	W	D	L	GF	GA	GD	Pts	Promotion or relegation
1	Reading (C, P)	46	29	7	10	67	51	+16	94	Promotion to the Second Division
2	Plymouth Argyle (P)	46	26	9	11	88	53	+35	87	Promotion to the Second Division
3	Derby County (P)	46	23	15	8	80	41	+39	84	Promotion to the Second Division
4	Wigan Athletic	46	23	14	9	82	48	+34	83	
5	Gillingham	46	22	13	11	81	54	+27	79	

(C) Champions; (P) Promoted

=== FA Cup ===
Round	Date	Opponent	Venue	Result	Scorers
R1	16 November 1985	Wealdstone	H	1–0	Horrix (pen)
R2	7 December 1985	Hereford United	H	2–0	Senior, Horrix
R3	4 January 1986	Huddersfield Town	A	0–0	
R3 Replay	13 January 1986	Huddersfield Town	H	2–1	Senior (2)
R4	25 January 1986	Bury	H	1–1	Senior
R4 Replay	28 January 1986	Bury	A	0–3	

=== League Cup ===
Round	Date	Opponent	Venue	Result	Scorers
R1 1st Leg	21 August 1985	Bournemouth	H	1–3	Rogers
R1 2nd Leg	3 September 1985	Bournemouth	A	0–2	

=== Associate Members Cup ===
Group 1
Team	Pld	W	D	L	GF	GA	GD	Pts
Leyton Orient	2	2	0	0	6	1	+5	6
Bournemouth	2	1	0	1	6	3	+3	3
Reading	2	0	0	2	0	8	−8	0

Round	Opponent	Venue	Result	Scorers
R1 A	Bournemouth	A	0–5	
R1 B	Leyton Orient	H	0–3	

== Squad statistics ==
=== Appearances and goals ===
No.	Pos	Nat	Player	Total		Division Three		FA Cup		League Cup		Members Cup	
No.	Pos	Nat	Player	Apps	Goals	Apps	Goals	Apps	Goals	Apps	Goals	Apps	Goals
	GK	(England) ENG	Gary Westwood	55	0	46	0	6	0	2	0	1	0
	DF	(England) ENG	Steve Wood	55	4	46	4	6	0	2	0	1	0
	DF	(Wales) WAL	Nigel Stevenson	3	0	3	0	0	0	0	0	0	0
	DF	(England) ENG	Brian Roberts	2	0	0+1	0	0	0	0	0	1	0
	DF	(England) ENG	Steve Richardson	38	0	32	0	4	0	2	0	0	0
	DF	(England) ENG	Gary Peters	47	2	41	2	5	0	0	0	1	0
	DF	(England) ENG	Martin Hicks	44	2	34	2	6	0	2	0	1+1	0
	DF	(England) ENG	Glenn Burvill	24	0	11+5	0	5	0	0+1	0	2	0
	MF	(England) ENG	Stuart Beavon	54	3	44	3	6	0	2	0	2	0
	MF	(Northern Ireland) NIR	Colin Bailie	34	0	25+1	0	3+2	0	2	0	1	0
	MF	(England) ENG	Michael Gilkes	15	2	7+2	2	3+1	0	0	0	2	0
	MF	(England) ENG	Terry Hurlock	16	0	16	0	0	0	0	0	0	0
	MF	(England) ENG	Deane Foster	2	0	0	0	0	0	0	0	2	0
	MF	(England) ENG	Nick Platnauer	8	0	7	0	0	0	0	0	1	0
	MF	(England) ENG	Sean Reck	1	0	1	0	0	0	0	0	0	0
	MF	(England) ENG	Andy Rogers	45	6	40	5	2	0	2	1	0+1	0
	MF	(England) ENG	Jerry Williams	37	4	26+5	4	3	0	2	0	1	0
	MF	(England) ENG	Mark White	27	3	25	3	0	0	2	0	0	0
	FW	(England) ENG	Trevor Senior	55	31	46	27	6	4	2	0	1	0
	FW	(Scotland) SCO	Kevin Bremner	28	7	18+4	7	5	0	0	0	1	0
	FW	(England) ENG	Dean Horrix	51	8	38+3	6	6	2	2	0	2	0

=== Goal scorers ===
As of match played 28 March 2026

Place	Position	Nation	Name	Division Three	FA Cup	League Cup	Members Cup	Total
1	FW	(England)	Trevor Senior	27	4	0	0	31
2	FW	(England)	Dean Horrix	6	2	0	0	8
3	FW	(Scotland)	Kevin Bremner	7	0	0	0	7
4	MF	(England)	Andy Rogers	5	0	1	0	6
5	MF	(England)	Jerry Williams	4	0	0	0	4
5	DF	(England)	Steve Wood	4	0	0	0	4
7	MF	(England)	Stuart Beavon	3	0	0	0	3
7	DF	(England)	Mark White	3	0	0	0	3
9	MF	(England)	Michael Gilkes	2	0	0	0	2
9	DF	(England)	Martin Hicks	2	0	0	0	2
9	DF	(England)	Gary Peters	2	0	0	0	2
			Own goal	2	0	0	0	2
Total				67	6	1	0	74

== See also ==
- 1985–86 in English football
