= List of Reading F.C. records and statistics =

Reading's progress through the English football league system from 1920 to present

Reading Football Club hold the record for the number of successive league wins at the start of a season, with a total of 13 wins at the start of the 1985–86 Third Division campaign.

The club's largest win was a 10–0 victory over Gibraltar on 10 July 2019 in a pre-season friendly. Their biggest league win was a 10–2 victory over Crystal Palace on 4 September 1946 in the Third Division South. Reading's heaviest loss was an 18–0 defeat against Preston North End in the FA Cup 1st round on 27 January 1894.

The player with the most league appearances is Martin Hicks with a total of 500 from 1978 to 1991. The most capped player is Kevin Doyle, who earned 26 for Ireland while at the club. The most league goals in total and in a season is Ronnie Blackman with 158 from 1947 to 1954 and 39 in 1951–52 respectively. The player with the most league goals in a game is Arthur Bacon with six against Stoke City in 1930–31. The first Reading-based player to play in the World Cup is Bobby Convey at the 2006 World Cup with the United States. The record time for a goalkeeper not conceding a goal is Steve Death at 1,103 minutes in 1978–79, which is a former English league record.

Reading's highest attendance at Elm Park was in 1927, when 33,042 spectators watched Reading beat Brentford 1–0. The highest attendance at the Madejski Stadium is 24,160 for the Premier League game with Tottenham Hotspur on 16 September 2012.

The highest transfer fee received for a Reading player is the £8 million received from Crystal Palace for Michael Olise in July 2021, beating the £7 million fee that 1899 Hoffenheim paid for Gylfi Sigurðsson in August 2010. The most expensive player Reading have ever bought is George Pușcaș, for an estimated £8,000,000 from Internazionale on 7 August 2019.

== Honours ==
League competitions

- English 2nd tier

Winners (2): 2006, 2012
Runners Up (1): 1995

- English 3rd tier

Winners (3): 1926, 1986, 1994
Runners Up (5): 1932, 1935, 1949, 1952, 2002

- English 4th tier

Winners (1): 1979

- Highest league finish

Premier League 2007, 8th Place

Cup competitions

- FA Cup

Semi-final: 1927, 2015
Quarter-final: 1901, 2010, 2011, 2016

- EFL Cup

Quarter-final: 1996, 1998

- Full Members Cup

Winners (1): 1988

- London War Cup

Winners (1): 1941

- Football League Third Division South Cup

Winners (1): 1938

Youth and reserve competitions

- Premier League Cup

Winners (1): 2014
Runners Up (1): 2017

- Berks & Bucks Senior Cup

Winners (5): 1879, 1892, 1995, 2022, 2024
Runners-Up (4): 1941, 1997, 1998, 2000

=== Managerial ===
- LMA Manager of the Year
  - Steve Coppell 2005–06, 2006–07
- LMA Championship Manager of the Year
  - Brian McDermott 2011–12

== Player records ==
Appearances

- Most appearances: Martin Hicks (603; 1978–1991)
- Most league appearances: Martin Hicks (500; 1978–1991)

Goals

- Most goals: Trevor Senior (191; 1983–1987, 1988–1992)
- Most goals in a season: Trevor Senior (41; 1983–84)
- Most league goals: Ronnie Blackman (158; 1947–1954)
- Most league goals in a season: Ronnie Blackman (39; 1951–52)
- Most league goals in a game: Arthur Bacon (6 vs. Stoke City; 1930–31)
- Most penalties: Ray Reeves (21)

Goalkeeping

- Longest time without conceding a goal: Steve Death (1,103 minutes; 1978–79; former English league record)

Transfers

- Record transfer fee paid: George Pușcaș (£7,500,00 from Inter Milan August 2019)
- Record transfer fee received: Michael Olise (£8,000,000 to Crystal Palace; July 2021)

Internationals

- Most capped player (whilst at Reading): Kevin Doyle (Republic of Ireland)
- First Reading-based player to play in World Cup: Bobby Convey (2006; United States)

=== Appearances ===
The following players have played more than 398 times for Reading, in all competitions.

Pos.	Player	App.
1	(England) Martin Hicks	603
2	(England) Steve Death	537
3	(England) Dick Spiers	505
4	(England) Michael Gilkes	487
5	(England) Stuart Beavon	481
6	(England) Maurice Evans	459
7	(England) Steve Richardson	457
8	(England) Jimmy Wheeler	453
9	(England) Phil Parkinson	426
10	(Wales) Ady Williams	398

=== Goalscorers ===
The following players have scored more than 85 times for Reading, in all competitions.

Pos.	Player	Gls
1	(England) Trevor Senior	191
2	(England) Jimmy Wheeler	168
3	(England) Ronnie Blackman	167
4	(England) Tony MacPhee	104
5	(England) Tommy Tait	103
6	(England) Denis Allen	95
7	(Northern Ireland) Jimmy Quinn	94
8	(England) Douggie Webb	93
9	(England) Les Chappell	90
10	(England) Pat Earles	85

=== List of hat-tricks ===
The Result column shows the Reading score first.

As of match played 28 March 2026

Key
(X)	Number of times player scored a hat-trick (only for players with multiple hat-tricks)
4	Player scored four goals
5	Player scored five goals
6	Player scored six goals
	Reading lost the match
	Reading drew the match

#	Player	G	Against	Res.	Date	Competition	Location	Ref.
1	(England) Kerry Dixon	3	Aldershot	3–3	21 August 1982	Group Cup	Away	
2	(England) Kerry Dixon (2)	4	Doncaster Rovers	5–7	25 September 1982	Third Division	Away	
3	(England) Kerry Dixon (3)	3	Newport County	4–3	6 November 1982	Third Division	Home	
4	(England) Gary Donnellan	3	Watford	5–3	8 December 1982	Group Cup	Home	
5	(England) Trevor Senior	3	Stockport County	6–2	3 September 1983	Fourth Division	Home	
6	(England) Trevor Senior (2)	3	Colchester United	4–3	14 September 1983	League Cup	Home	
7	(England) Trevor Senior (3)	3	Cambridge United	3–1	24 November 1984	Third Division	Home	
8	(England) Trevor Senior (4)	3	Cardiff City	3–1	31 August 1985	Third Division	Away	
9	(England) Trevor Senior (5)	3	Bristol Rovers	4–2	2 October 1985	Third Division	Home	
10	(England) Trevor Senior (6)	3	Bristol Rovers	4–0	3 September 1986	League Cup	Home	
11	(England) Trevor Senior (7)	3	Swansea City	6–1	23 September 1989	Third Division	Away	
12	(England) Craig Maskell	3	Darlington	4–2	10 March 1992	Third Division	Away	
13	(Australia) Stuart Lovell	3	Swindon Town	3–0	1 April 1995	First Division	Home	
14	(Wales) Lee Nogan	3	Port Vale	3–3	15 April 1995	First Division	Home	
15	(Wales) Lee Nogan (2)	3	Southend United	3–3	19 March 1996	First Division	Home	
16	(England) Trevor Morley	3	Bolton Wanderers	3–2	8 February 1997	First Division	Home	
17	(England) Jamie Cureton	3	Brentford	4–0	9 September 2000	Second Division	Home	
18	(England) Martin Butler	3	Swansea City	4–0	23 September 2000	Second Division	Home	
19	(England) Jamie Cureton (2)	3	Luton Town	4–1	23 December 2000	Second Division	Home	
20	(England) Nicky Forster	3	Blackpool	3–0	19 January 2002	Second Division	Home	
21	(England) Nicky Forster (2)	3	Ipswich Town	3–0	19 October 2002	Second Division	Home	
21	(England) Nicky Forster (3)	3	Preston North End	3–0	15 April 2003	Second Division	Home	
22	(England) Dave Kitson	3	Gillingham	3–1	18 September 2004	EFL Championship	Home	
23	(England) Dave Kitson (2)	3	West Ham United	3–1	12 March 2005	EFL Championship	Home	
24	(England) Dave Kitson (3)	3	Brighton & Hove Albion	5–1	10 December 2005	EFL Championship	Home	
25	(England) Leroy Lita	3	West Bromwich Albion	3–2	17 January 2006	FA Cup	Home	
26	(Republic of Ireland) Kevin Doyle	3	Crystal Palace	4–2	30 August 2008	EFL Championship	Home	
27	(Republic of Ireland) Kevin Doyle (2)	3	Sheffield Wednesday	6–0	16 September 2008	EFL Championship	Home	
28	(England) Adam Le Fondre	3	Bolton Wanderers	7–1	18 January 2014	EFL Championship	Home	
29	(England) Adam Le Fondre (2)	3	Blackpool	5–1	28 January 2014	EFL Championship	Home	
30	(Portugal) Orlando Sá	3	Ipswich Town	5–1	19 January 2016	EFL Championship	Home	
31	(Czech Republic) Matěj Vydra	3	Huddersfield	5–2	19 January 2016	FA Cup	Home	
32	(Iceland) Jón Daði Böðvarsson	3	Stevenage	3–0	16 January 2018	FA Cup	Home	
33	(Romania) George Pușcaș	3	Wigan Athletic	3–1	30 November 2019	EFL Championship	Away	
34	(Ivory Coast) Yakou Méïté	4	Luton Town	5–0	4 July 2020	EFL Championship	Away	
35	(Portugal) Lucas João	3	Colchester United	3–0	5 September 2020	EFL Cup	Home	
36	(England) John Swift	3	Queens Park Rangers	3–3	11 September 2021	EFL Championship	Home	
37	(England) Harvey Knibbs	3	Swindon Town	5–0	10 October 2023	EFL Trophy	Home	
38	(England) Jack Marriott	3	Wycombe Wanderers	3–2	14 February 2026	EFL League One	Home	
39	(Nigeria) Kelvin Ehibhatiomhan	3	Luton Town	3–2	7 March 2026	EFL League One	Away	
40	(England) Jack Marriott (2)	3	Luton Town	3–4	15 August 2026	EFL League One	Home	

== Team records ==
- Biggest win: 9–0 v Exeter City (19 September 2023, Football League Trophy)
- Heaviest defeat: 18–0 v Preston North End (27 January 1894, FA Cup 1st round)
- Longest winning sequence at the start of a season: 13 victories in 1985–86.
- Most points in a single season in any English professional league: 106 points (2005–06)
- Longest winless sequence at the start of a season (club record): 6 (2 draws and 4 defeats), (2018–19)
- Heaviest home defeat: 7-0 vs Fulham, (11 January 2022)
- Longest winless sequence: 15 defeats (4 March 2023 - 8 August 2023)
