= 1988 Full Members' Cup final =

1988 Simod Cup final
- Event: 1987–88 Full Members' Cup
Luton Town	Reading
1	4
- Date: 27 March 1988
- Venue: Wembley Stadium, London
- Attendance: 61,740

The 1988 Full Members' Cup final was the third Full Members' Cup final, contested by First Division side Luton Town and Second Division team Reading at Wembley Stadium on 27 March 1988. It was the first, and only, Full Members' Cup final for both teams. Reading were making their first appearance at the national stadium, while Luton had not played at the ground since 1959.

== Background ==
English teams had been banned from Europe following the Heysel Stadium disaster at the 1985 European Cup final between Liverpool and Juventus. The Football League started a new tournament for sides in the top two leagues to increase revenues, particularly for sides who had lost revenue through the lack of European football. The 1987–88 Full Members' Cup saw Reading start in the first round of the competition, while Luton were given a bye to the third round following their high league position in the previous season. Reading defeated a top division side in all rounds, excluding the quarter-finals.

Reading's semi-final victory against Coventry City became the latest finish to a football match in Britain at the time, finishing at 22:38. The record stood until 2002.

=== Route to the final ===
==== Luton Town ====
10 February 1988 Third round	Everton (1)	1–2	Luton Town (1)	Goodison Park, Liverpool

1 March 1988 Quarter-final	Luton Town (1)	4–1	Stoke City (2)	Kenilworth Road, Luton
			Shaw	Attendance: 4,480

8 March 1988 Semi-final	Luton Town (1)	2–1 (a.e.t.)	Swindon Town (2)	Kenilworth Road, Luton

==== Reading ====
21 December 1987 First round	Queens Park Rangers (1)	1–3	Reading (2)	Loftus Road, London
			Jones; Tait

13 January 1988 Second round	Reading (2)	1–0	Oxford United (1)	Elm Park, Reading
	Horrix

3 February 1988 Third round	Reading (2)	2–1 (a.e.t.)	Nottingham Forest (1)	Elm Park, Reading
	Horrix; Beavon

10 February 1988 Quarter-final	Reading (2)	2–1 (a.e.t.)	Bradford City (2)	Elm Park, Reading
	Bailie; Horrix

2 March 1988 Semi-final	Reading (2)	1–1 (a.e.t.) (4–3 p)	Coventry City (1)	Elm Park, Reading
	Smillie 57'		Speedie 79'	Attendance: ~15,000
	Penalties
	Curle (penalty missed); Beavon (penalty scored); Horrix (penalty scored); Williams (penalty scored); Gilkes (penalty scored)		Kilcline (penalty scored); Downs (penalty scored); Sedgley (penalty missed); Smith (penalty scored); Bennett (penalty missed)

== Match summary ==
England international Mick Harford put Luton 1–0 up after fourteen minutes, although he admitted after the game that he handled the ball into the net. On twenty minutes, Michael Gilkes levelled the game for Reading. Gilkes was fouled five minutes later and Reading were awarded a penalty. Stuart Beavon dispatched it, despite Les Sealey, in the Luton goal, guessing the right direction. Mick Tait doubled Reading's lead on 55 minutes, while Neil Smillie finished the game off with the Royals' fourth.

=== Aftermath ===
Reading became the second non-top flight side in a row to win the competition, after Blackburn Rovers, but were unable to defend the trophy due to relegation to the Third Division later on in the season. The club never played a Full Members' Cup match again, before the competition was abolished at the end of the 1991–92 season. The victory remains the only major trophy that the club has won, with two semi-final appearances in the FA Cup being the next best cup results for Reading.

Victory for Luton would've been their first major trophy, as well, but they only had to wait a month after the Full Members' Cup final before they defeated Arsenal in the League Cup final to do so. They subsequently finished their First Division season in ninth position. Luton didn't appear in another Full Members' Cup final; a southern semi-final appearance in the 1990–91 season being their best performance following their defeat.

== Match details ==
27 March 1988
15:00 BST

Luton Town	1–4	Reading
Harford 13'		Gilkes 20'; Beavon 25' (pen.); Tait 57'; Smillie 66'

Wembley Stadium, London
Attendance: 61,740

Luton Town	Reading

GK	1	(England) Les Sealey
RB	2	(England) Tim Breacker
CB	5	(England) Steve Foster
CB	6	(Northern Ireland) Mal Donaghy
LB	3	(Republic of Ireland) Ashley Grimes
RM	7	(Northern Ireland) Danny Wilson
CM	4	(England) Darron McDonough
CM	8	(England) Brian Stein
LM	11	(England) Ian Allinson
CF	9	(England) Mick Harford
CF	10	(England) Mark Stein
Substitutes:
GK		(Wales) Andy Dibble
DF		(England) Rob Johnson
MF		(Northern Ireland) Kingsley Black
MF		(England) David Oldfield
FW		(Nigeria) Emeka Nwajiobi
Manager:
(England) Ray Harford

GK	1	(England) Steve Francis
RB	2	(Northern Ireland) Colin Bailie
CB	5	(England) Martin Hicks
CB	6	(England) Keith Curle
LB	3	(England) Steve Richardson
RM	7	(Wales) Linden Jones
CM	4	(Northern Ireland) Stuart Beavon
CM	8	(England) Les Taylor
LM	11	(England) Neil Smillie
CF	9	(England) Mick Tait
CF	10	(England) Michael Gilkes
Substitutes:
GK		(England) Gary Westwood
DF		(England) Paul Franklin
MF		(England) Gary Peters
MF		(England) Jerry Williams
FW		(England) Francis Joseph
Manager:
(England) Ian Branfoot

Match rules

- 90 minutes
- 30 minutes of extra-time if necessary
- Penalty shootout if scores still level
- Five named substitutes
- Maximum of two substitutions
