= List of Reading F.C. seasons =

Reading performance from 1920 until 2026

This is a list of seasons played by Reading F.C. in the English Football League. The team, established in 1871, competes in EFL League One, the third football league in England. Established in 1871, the club first entered the FA Cup in 1878–79 but did not play league football until the 1920–21 season.

The club has competed in all four tiers of the English Football League and has won the Championship twice, the Football League Second Division three times, the Football League Third Division once, reached the FA Cup semi-finals twice, reached the EFL Cup quarter-finals twice, won the London War Cup, won the Full Members Cup, won the Football League Third Division South Cup and won the Berks & Bucks Senior Cup five times.

== Key ==
- Pld = Matches played
- W = Matches won
- D = Matches drawn
- L = Matches lost
- GF = Goals for
- GA = Goals against
- Pts = Points
- Pos = Final position
- Premier League = Premier League
- Championship = EFL Championship
- Division 1 = Football League First Division
- Division 2 = Football League Second Division
- Division 3 = Football League Third Division
- Division 3 South = Football League Third Division South
- Division 4 = Football League Fourth Division
- Southern 1 = Southern Football League Division 1
- Southern 2 = Southern Football League Division 2
- Western Pro = Western Football League Professional Section
- Western 1 (A/B) = Western Football League Division One (Section A/B)
- United = United League
- Group = Group stage
- QR1/2/3 = First/Second/Third qualifying round etc.
- RInt = Intermediate round
- R1/2/3 = First/Second/Third round etc.
- QF = Quarter-finals
- SF = Semi-finals
- F = Final
- W = Winners

Champions	Runners-up	Promoted	Play-Offs	Relegated

== Seasons ==
Season	League									FA Cup	EFL Cup	EFL Trophy	Other (Note: Covers the Berks & Bucks Senior Cup, FA Amateur Cup, Third Division South Cup, Southern Professional Floodlit Cup, Football League Group Cup (known as the Football League Trophy for the 1982–83 season), Associate Members' Cup (known as the Football League Trophy from the 1992–93 season onwards) and the Full Members' Cup.)		Top scorer(s) (Note: Includes goals scored in the Premier League, Football League (including play-offs), FA Cup, League Cup, Full Members' Cup and Football League Trophy, (known prior to 1992 as the Associate Members' Cup). Top goalscorers from 1970–71 to 1995–96 are sourced to Royals Record, and from 1996–97 to the present are sourced to Soccerbase.)	
Season	Division	Pld	W	D	L	GF	GA	Pts	Pos	FA Cup	EFL Cup	EFL Trophy	Competition	Result	Player(s)	Goals
1877–78										R2	–	–				
1878–79										R2	–	–	Berks & Bucks Senior Cup	W		
1879–80										R1	–	–				
1880–81										R2	–	–				
1881–82										R4	–	–				
1882–83										R2	–	–				
1883–84										R3	–	–				
1884–85										R2	–	–				
1885–86										R1	–	–				
1886–87										R1	–	–				
1887–88										R1	–	–				
1888–89										QR1	–	–				
1889–90										QR2	–	–				
1890–91										QR1	–	–				
1891–92										QR2	–	–	Berks & Bucks Senior Cup	W		
1892–93										QR3	–	–				
1893–94										R1	–	–	FA Amateur Cup	R2		
1894–95	Southern 1	16	6	2	8	33	38	14	5th	QR3	–	–	FA Amateur Cup	QF		
1895–96	Southern 1	18	11	1	6	45	38	23	4th	QR3	–	–				
1896–97	Southern 1	20	8	3	9	31	49	19	7th	QR4	–	–				
1897–98	Southern 1 Western Pro	22 14	8 7	7 2	7 5	39 28	31 25	23 16	5th 3rd	QR3	–	–				
1898–99	Southern 1 United League	24 20	9 8	8 5	7 7	31 36	24 25	26 21	5th 6th	QR5	–	–				
1899–1900	Southern 1	28	15	2	11	41	28	32	4th	R1	–	–				
1900–01	Southern 1 Western 1	28 16	8 5	8 5	12 6	24 24	25 29	24 15	9th 6th	R3	–	–				
1901–02	Southern 1 Western 1	30 16	16 7	7 3	7 6	57 29	24 22	39 17	5th 3rd	R2	–	–				
1902–03	Southern 1 Western 1	30 16	19 7	7 0	4 9	72 20	30 21	45 14	2nd 6th	R1	–	–				
1903–04	Southern 1 Western 1	34 16	14 4	13 4	7 8	48 16	35 26	41 12	6th 7th	R1	–	–				
1904–05	Southern 1 Western 1	34 20	18 6	7 3	9 11	57 27	38 37	43 15	2nd 9th	R1	–	–				
1905–06	Southern 1 Western 1	34 20	12 6	9 6	13 8	53 28	46 38	33 18	10th 9th	R2	–	–				
1906–07	Southern 1 Western 1A	38 10	14 4	6 1	18 5	57 12	47 18	34 9	12th 4th	R1	–	–				
1907–08	Southern 1 Western 1B	38 12	15 4	6 3	17 5	55 20	50 25	36 11	12th 5th	R1	–	–				
1908–09	Southern 1 Western 1A	40 12	11 4	18 2	11 6	60 19	57 21	40 10	8th 6th	R1	–	–				
1909–10	Southern 1	42	7	10	25	38	73	24	22nd	R1	–	–				
1910–11	Southern 2	22	16	3	3	55	11	35	1st	QR4	–	–				
1911–12	Southern 1	38	11	14	13	43	69	36	11th	R3	–	–				
1912–13	Southern 1	38	17	8	13	59	55	42	8th	R3	–	–				
1913–14	Southern 1	38	17	10	11	43	36	44	4th	R1	–	–				
1914–15	Southern 1	38	21	7	10	68	43	49	2nd	R1	–	–				
1915–19	The Southern League and FA Cup were suspended until the First World War ended in November 1918.															
1919–20	Southern 1	42	16	13	13	51	43	45	7th	R1	–	–				
1920–21	Division 3 (Note: At the start of the 1920–21 season Reading, along with virtually all of the clubs in the top division of the Southern Football League were elected to the Football League Third Division.)	42	12	7	23	42	59	31	20th	R1	–	–				
1921–22	Division 3 South (Note: A year after Reading joined the league, the Third Division was split regionally into North and South Divisions.)	42	14	10	18	40	47	38	13th	R1	–	–				
1922–23	Division 3 South	42	10	14	18	36	55	34	19th	QR5	–	–				
1923–24	Division 3 South	42	13	9	20	51	57	35	18th	QR5	–	–				
1924–25	Division 3 South	42	14	10	18	37	38	38	14th	QR6	–	–				
1925–26	Division 3 South	42	23	11	8	77	52	57	1st	R3	–	–				
1926–27	Division 2	42	16	8	18	64	72	40	14th	SF	–	–				
1927–28	Division 2	42	11	13	18	53	75	35	18th	R4	–	–				
1928–29	Division 2	42	15	9	18	63	86	39	15th	R5	–	–				
1929–30	Division 2	42	12	11	19	54	67	35	19th	R3	–	–				
1930–31	Division 2	42	12	6	24	72	96	30	21st	R3	–	–				
1931–32	Division 3 South	42	23	9	10	97	67	55	2nd	R1	–	–				
1932–33	Division 3 South	42	19	13	10	103	71	51	4th	R3	–	–				
1933–34	Division 3 South	42	21	12	9	82	50	54	3rd	R3	–	–	Third Division South Cup	R2		
1934–35	Division 3 South	42	21	11	10	89	65	53	2nd	R5	–	–	Third Division South Cup	R1		
1935–36	Division 3 South	42	26	2	14	87	62	54	3rd	R3	–	–	Third Division South Cup	R3		
1936–37	Division 3 South	42	19	11	12	76	60	49	5th	R3	–	–	Third Division South Cup	R2		
1937–38	Division 3 South	42	20	11	11	71	63	51	6th	R1	–	–	Third Division South Cup	W		
1938–39	Division 3 South	42	16	14	12	69	59	46	5th	R1	–	–	Third Division South Cup	R3		
1939–40	Division 3 South	3	2	1	0	8	2	5	1st (Note: The outbreak of the Second World War meant that the 1939–40 Third Division South was abandoned after only three games with Reading topping the table. In its place, several regional leagues were set up with Reading competing in League South B and League South D, finish 4th and 9th respectively (of 10 teams).)	– (Note: The FA Cup was abandoned before any matches were played with the Football League War Cup held in its place. Reading reached the second round, losing 4–0 to Birmingham over two legs.)	–	–	–			
1940–45	The Football league and FA Cup were suspended until the Second World War ended in September 1945.															
1945–46	–									R1 (Note: The FA Cup was contested during 1945–46 though the Football League did not resume until the following season.)	–	–	Third Division South Cup	Group		
1946–47	Division 3 South	42	16	11	15	83	74	43	9th	R3	–	–	–			
1947–48	Division 3 South	42	15	11	16	56	58	41	10th	R3	–	–	–			
1948–49	Division 3 South	42	25	5	12	77	50	55	2nd	R2	–	–	–			
1949–50	Division 3 South	42	17	8	17	70	64	42	10th	R3	–	–	–			
1950–51	Division 3 South	46	21	15	10	88	53	57	3rd	R3	–	–	–			
1951–52	Division 3 South	46	29	3	14	112	60	61	2nd	R3	–	–	–			
1952–53	Division 3 South	46	19	8	19	69	64	46	11th	R1	–	–	–			
1953–54	Division 3 South	46	20	9	17	86	73	49	8th	R1	–	–	–			
1954–55	Division 3 South	46	13	15	18	65	73	41	18th	R3	–	–	–			
1955–56	Division 3 South	46	15	9	22	70	79	39	17th	R2	–	–	Southern Floodlit Cup	SF		
1956–57	Division 3 South	46	18	9	19	80	81	45	13th	R3	–	–	Southern Floodlit Cup	F		
1957–58	Division 3 South	46	21	13	12	79	51	55	5th	R3	–	–	Southern Floodlit Cup	F		
1958–59	Division 3	46	21	8	17	78	63	50	6th	R1	–	–	Southern Floodlit Cup	R1		
1959–60	Division 3	46	18	10	18	84	77	46	11th	R3	–	–	Southern Floodlit Cup	R2		
1960–61	Division 3	46	14	12	20	72	83	40	18th	R3	R2	–	–			
1961–62	Division 3	46	22	9	15	77	66	53	7th	R1	R2	–	–			
1962–63	Division 3	46	16	8	22	74	78	40	20th	R1	R2	–	–			
1963–64	Division 3	46	21	10	15	79	62	52	6th	R2	R1	–	–			
1964–65	Division 3	46	16	14	16	70	70	46	13th	R4	R4	–	–			
1965–66	Division 3	46	19	13	14	70	63	51	8th	R3	R4	–	–			
1966–67	Division 3	46	22	9	15	76	57	53	4th	R2	R2	–	–			
1967–68	Division 3	46	21	9	16	70	60	51	5th	R3	R3	–	–			
1968–69	Division 3	46	15	13	18	67	66	43	14th	R3	R1	–	–			
1969–70	Division 3	46	21	11	14	87	77	53	8th	R1	R1	–	–			
1970–71	Division 3	46	14	11	21	48	85	39	21st	R3	R1	–	–		(Scotland) Gordon Cumming	15
1971–72	Division 4	46	17	8	21	56	76	42	16th (Note: Lowest League finish.)	R4	R1	–	–		(Scotland) Gordon Cumming	19
1972–73	Division 4	46	17	18	11	51	38	52	7th	R4	R1	–	–		(England) Les Chappell	17
1973–74	Division 4	46	16	19	11	58	37	51	6th	R2	R2	–	–		(England) Les Chappell	28
1974–75	Division 4	46	21	10	15	63	47	52	7th	R1	R3	–	–		(England) Robin Friday	20
1975–76	Division 4	46	24	12	10	70	51	60	3rd	R1	R1	–	–		(England) Robin Friday	22
1976–77	Division 3	46	13	9	24	49	73	35	21st	R3	R1	–	–		(England) John Murray	19
1977–78	Division 4	46	18	14	14	55	52	50	8th	R2	R1	–	–		(England) Pat Earles	18
1978–79	Division 4	46	26	13	7	76	35	65	1st	R3	R4	–	–		(England) Pat Earles	19
1979–80	Division 3	46	16	16	14	66	65	48	7th	R4	R2	–	–		(England) Pat Earles (Scotland) Mike Kearney	16
1980–81	Division 3	46	18	10	18	62	62	46	10th	R1	R2	–	–		(England) Kerry Dixon	13
1981–82	Division 3	46	17	11	18	67	75	62 (Note: The 1981–82 season saw the introduction of three points for a win rather than two which was used previously.)	12th	R1	R1	–	Football League Group Cup	Group	(England) Kerry Dixon (England) Neil Webb	15
1982–83	Division 3	46	12	17	17	64	79	53	21st	R1	R1	–	Football League Trophy	SF	(England) Kerry Dixon	32
1983–84	Division 4	46	22	16	8	84	56	82	3rd	R2	R1	R1	–		(England) Trevor Senior	41
1984–85	Division 3	46	19	12	15	68	62	69	9th	R3	R1	R1	–		(England) Trevor Senior	27
1985–86	Division 3	46	29	7	10	67	51	94	1st	R4	R1	Group	–		(England) Trevor Senior	31
1986–87	Division 2	42	14	11	17	52	59	53	13th	R3	R2	–	Full Members' Cup	R2	(England) Trevor Senior	24
1987–88	Division 2	42	10	12	22	44	70	42	22nd	R3	R4	–	Full Members' Cup	W	(England) Colin Gordon	10
1988–89	Division 3	46	15	11	20	68	72	56	18th	R4	R2	R1	–		(England) Trevor Senior	24
1989–90	Division 3	46	15	19	12	57	53	64	10th	R4	R2	R1	–		(England) Trevor Senior	22
1990–91	Division 3	46	17	8	21	53	66	59	15th	R1	R1	Group	–		(England) Trevor Senior	15
1991–92	Division 3	46	16	13	17	59	62	61	12th	R3	R1	Group	–		(England) Craig Maskell	16
1992–93	Division 2 (Note: In 1991, following the breakaway of the 22 First Division clubs to form the Premier League, the Football League divisions were renamed. As a result of the re-branding, the Third Division was renamed the Second Division.)	46	18	15	13	66	51	69	8th	R3	R2	R2	–		(Northern Ireland) Jimmy Quinn	23
1993–94	Division 2	46	26	11	9	81	44	89	1st	R1	R2	QF	–		(Northern Ireland) Jimmy Quinn	40
1994–95	Division 1	46	23	10	13	58	44	79	2nd (Note: The Premier League was reduced from 22 teams to 20 from the 1995–96 season onwards. As a result only one team was promoted automatically from the First Division during the 1994–95 season with the second placed team entering the play-offs. Reading lost 4–3 in the play-off final to Bolton Wanderers.)	R3	R2	–	Berks & Bucks Senior Cup	W	(Australia) Stuart Lovell	14
1995–96	Division 1	46	13	17	16	54	63	56	19th	R4	QF	–	–		(Northern Ireland) Jimmy Quinn	17
1996–97	Division 1	46	15	12	19	58	67	57	18th	R4	R1	–	Berks & Bucks Senior Cup	F	(England) Trevor Morley	23
1997–98	Division 1	46	11	9	26	39	78	42	24th	R5	QF	–	Berks & Bucks Senior Cup	F	(England) Carl Asaba	12
1998–99	Division 2	46	16	13	17	54	63	61	11th	R1	R2	R1	–		(England) Martin Williams	11
1999–2000	Division 2	46	16	14	16	57	63	62	10th	R3	R2	SF	Berks & Bucks Senior Cup	F	(England) Darren Caskey	23
2000–01	Division 2	46	25	11	10	86	52	86	3rd	R2	R1	QF	–		(England) Jamie Cureton	30
2001–02	Division 2	46	23	15	8	70	43	84	2nd	R2	R3	QF	–		(England) Nicky Forster	18
2002–03	Division 1	46	25	4	17	61	46	79	4th	R3	R1	–	–		(England) Nicky Forster	17
2003–04	Division 1	46	20	10	16	55	57	70	9th	R3	R4	–	–		(Bermuda) Shaun Goater	14
2004–05	Championship (Note: The First Division was re-branded as The Championship from the 2004–05 season.)	46	19	13	14	51	44	70	7th	R4	R2	–	–		(England) Dave Kitson	19
2005–06	Championship	46	31	13	2	99	32	106	1st	R4	R4	–	–		(England) Dave Kitson	22
2006–07	Premier League	38	16	7	15	52	47	55	8th (Note: Highest League finish.)	R5	R3	–	–		(England) Leroy Lita	14
2007–08	Premier League	38	10	6	22	41	66	36	18th	R3	R3	–	–		(England) Dave Kitson	10
2008–09	Championship	46	21	14	11	72	40	77	4th	R3	R3	–	–		(Republic of Ireland) Kevin Doyle	18
2009–10	Championship	46	17	12	17	68	63	63	9th	R6	R2	–	–		(Iceland) Gylfi Sigurðsson	20
2010–11	Championship	46	20	17	9	77	51	77	5th	R6	R2	–	–		(Republic of Ireland) Shane Long	25
2011–12	Championship	46	27	8	11	69	41	89	1st	R3	R1	–	–		(England) Adam Le Fondre	12
2012–13	Premier League	38	6	10	22	43	73	28	19th	R5	R4	–	–		(England) Adam Le Fondre	14
2013–14	Championship	46	19	14	13	70	56	71	7th	R3	R2	–	–		(England) Adam Le Fondre	15
2014–15	Championship	46	13	11	22	48	69	50	19th	SF	R3	–	–		(England) Glenn Murray (Republic of Ireland) Simon Cox	8
2015–16	Championship	46	13	13	20	52	59	52	17th	R6	R3	–	–		(England) Nick Blackman	11
2016–17	Championship	46	26	7	13	68	64	85	3rd	R3	R4	R3 (Note: Reading were invited to the EFL Trophy due to having a Category One academy. Officially, they were represented by a development side and were required to feature six under-21 players in their matchday squads.)	–		(France) Yann Kermorgant	19
2017–18	Championship	46	10	14	22	48	70	44	20th	R4	R3	Group	–		(The Gambia) Modou Barrow (Iceland) Jón Daði Böðvarsson	10
2018–19	Championship	46	10	17	19	49	66	47	20th	R3	R2	–	Berks & Bucks Senior Cup (Note: Reading were represented in the Berks & Bucks Senior Cup by a development side.)	F	(Ivory Coast) Yakou Méïté	13
2019–20	Championship	46	15	11	20	59	58	56	14th	R5	R3	–	Berks & Bucks Senior Cup	SF (Note: Reading reached the semi-finals of the 2019–20 Berks & Bucks Cup, however the competition was cancelled due to the COVID-19 pandemic.)	(Ivory Coast) Yakou Méïté	17
2020–21	Championship	46	19	13	14	62	54	70	7th	R3	R2	–	–		(Portugal) Lucas João (Note: Lucas João switched his international allegiance from Portugal to Angola during the 2021–22 season.)	22
2021–22	Championship	46	13	8	25	54	87	41 (Note: Reading were deducted 6 points due to breaching the EFL's profitability and sustainability rules.)	21st	R3	R1	–	Berks & Bucks Senior Cup	W	(England) John Swift	11
2022–23	Championship	46	13	11	22	46	68	44 (Note: Reading were deducted 6 points for breaching an EFL business plan.)	22nd	R4	R1	–	Berks & Bucks Senior Cup	SF	(England) Andy Carroll (England) Tom Ince	9
2023–24	League One	46	16	11	19	68	70	53 (Note: Reading were deducted 6 points: One point for failing to pay players on time and in full on three occasions in the 2022–23 season.; Three points for failing to deposit wages on time.; Two points due to late HMRC payments.)	17th	R2	R2	R3	Berks & Bucks Senior Cup	W	(England) Sam Smith (England) Harvey Knibbs	16
2024–25	League One	46	21	12	13	68	57	75	7th	R3	R1	R2	Berks & Bucks Senior Cup	QF	(England) Harvey Knibbs	16
2025–26	League One	46	16	15	15	64	60	63	12th	R1	R3	Group	Berks & Bucks Senior Cup	SF	(England) Jack Marriott	17
