= Michael Dixon =

Michael Dixon may refer to:

- Michael Dixon (basketball) (born 1990), basketball player
- Mike Dixon (footballer, born 1937) (1937–2022), English footballer for Coventry and Luton
- Mike Dixon (footballer, born 1943) (1943–1993), English footballer for Reading and Aldershot
- Michael Dixon (doctor), British general practitioner and former chair of the NHS Alliance
- Michael Dixon (museum director) (born 1956), former director of the Natural History Museum; principal of Green Templeton College, Oxford since 2020
- Michael Dixon (U.S. politician), U.S. political activist
- Mike Dixon, Baron Dixon of Jericho, British peer
- Mike Dixon (rugby league) (born 1971), rugby league footballer for Scotland, Hull F.C., and Hull Kingston Rovers
- Michael Dixon (umpire) (born 1954), English cricket umpire
- Mike Dixon (biathlete) (born 1962), Briton who competed at six Winter Olympics
- Mike Dixon (Brookside), character in British soap opera Brookside
- Mike Dixon, owner of Major League Productions

== See also ==
- Michael Dickson (disambiguation)
