= Stuart Beavon =

Stuart Beavon may refer to:

- Stuart Beavon (footballer born 1958), English footballer
- Stuart Beavon (footballer born 1984), English footballer
