= Keith Curle =

English professional footballer and manager

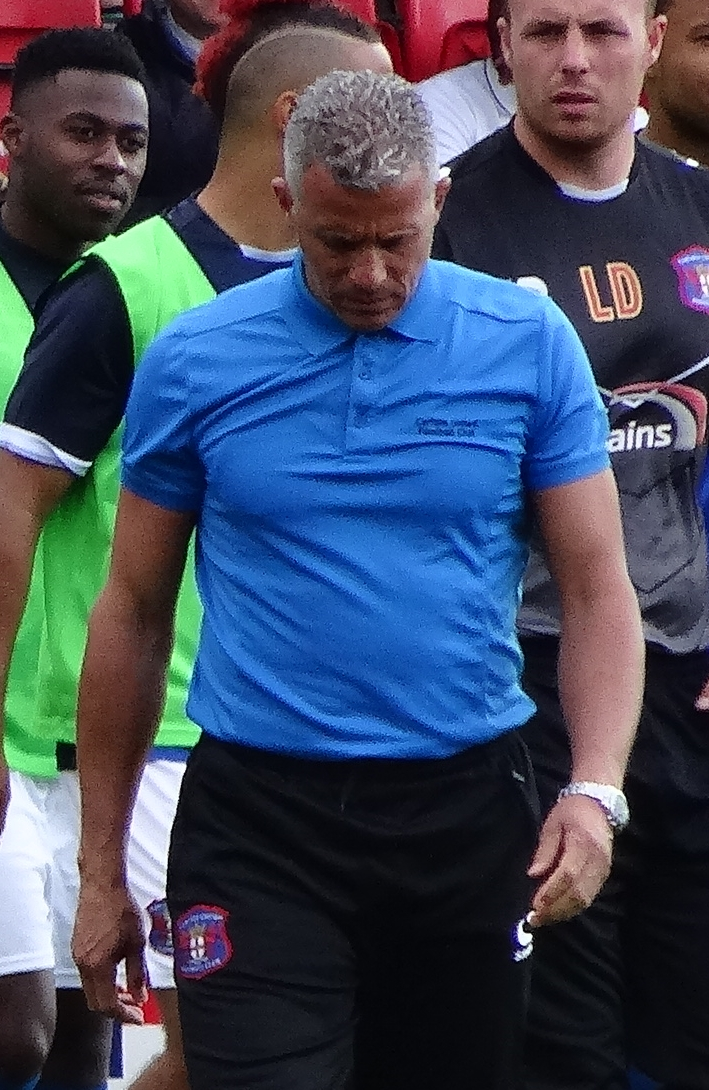
- Curle as manager of Carlisle United in 2015

Personal information
- Full name: Keith Curle
- Date of birth: 14 November 1963 (age 62)
- Place of birth: Bristol, England
- Height: 6 ft 0 in (1.83 m)
- Position: Centre back

Team information
- Current team: Macclesfield (chief executive officer)

Senior career*
Years	Team	Apps	(Gls)
1981–1983	Bristol Rovers	32	(4)
1983–1984	Torquay United	16	(5)
1984–1987	Bristol City	121	(1)
1987–1988	Reading	40	(0)
1988–1991	Wimbledon	93	(3)
1991–1996	Manchester City	174	(11)
1996–2000	Wolverhampton Wanderers	150	(10)
2000–2002	Sheffield United	57	(1)
2002	Barnsley	11	(0)
2002–2003	Mansfield Town	14	(0)
Total		708	(35)

International career
1991–1992	England B	4	(0)
1992	England	3	(0)

Managerial career
- 2002–2004: Mansfield Town
- 2005–2006: Chester City
- 2007: Torquay United
- 2012–2013: Notts County
- 2014–2018: Carlisle United
- 2018–2021: Northampton Town
- 2021: Oldham Athletic
- 2022–2023: Hartlepool United
- * Club domestic league appearances and goals

Keith Curle (born 14 November 1963) is an English football manager and former professional player, who is currently the Chief Executive Officer of National League North club Macclesfield.

He played as a centre back from 1981 to 2005, notably in the Premier League for Manchester City, where he was also the club captain. He also played for Bristol Rovers, Torquay United, Bristol City, Reading, Wimbledon, Wolverhampton Wanderers, Sheffield United, Barnsley. He was capped three times by England and received four caps at B Team level.

He became player-manager of Mansfield Town in 2002, where he remained until 2005. He later managed Chester City, Torquay United, Notts County, Carlisle United, Northampton Town and Oldham Athletic.

== Playing career ==
Born in Bristol, Curle began his career at hometown club Bristol Rovers, for whom he made a goalscoring debut on 29 August 1981 in the (old) Third Division against Chester. He left two seasons later to join Torquay United for £5,000 but remained at Plainmoor only for four months before returning to his native city, this time with Bristol City.

The Robins won promotion from the fourth tier at the end of the 1983–84 season soon after Curle's arrival. He remained with the club for three full seasons in the third flight, amassing 128 appearances in total. He finally left Ashton Gate to join Reading for £150,000 in October 1987.

After a year at Reading – during which Reading won the Simod Cup and were relegated from the Second Division – he made a £500,000 move to Division One and FA Cup holders Wimbledon. He spent two and a half years battling with the Crazy Gang before Manchester City paid a club record £2.5million for him in August 1991. This was the joint highest fee paid for a defender by a British club at the time, and one of the highest paid for a player of any position.

His first season at Maine Road saw a fifth place league finish and earned him a call-up to the England squad, debuting on 29 April 1992 as a substitute in a 2–2 friendly draw against the CIS in Moscow. After starting in a further warm-up game (a 1–0 win over Hungary), he was selected for the squad for Euro '92. Here, he covered at right-back in their opening goalless group game against Denmark, but played no further part as the nation crashed out at the first stage and was not selected again.

Back with his club, Curle was promoted to club captain but they were unable to match their fifth-place finish after manager Peter Reid was fired and eventually suffered relegation in the 1995–96 season. Curle remained with the club during pre-season for the following campaign but was soon stripped of his captaincy and transfer-listed before being sold to Wolves in August 1996 for £650,000.

He spent four seasons at Molineux as the club tried to win promotion to the Premier League. His first season with the team saw them lose in the play-offs to Crystal Palace, but they failed to qualify for them in his subsequent seasons. He was however made club captain and led to the side to an FA Cup semi-final in 1998, where they lost to eventual double winners Arsenal.

The promise of a coaching role saw him move to Sheffield United in 2000 and he spent two years working with manager Neil Warnock in this capacity, scoring once as a player against Bradford City. He joined Barnsley in 2002 but stayed just two months before ending his contract by mutual consent and joining third flight club Mansfield Town, where he was soon appointed player-manager. He played through the remainder of the 2002–03 season before focusing solely on management.

== Managerial career ==
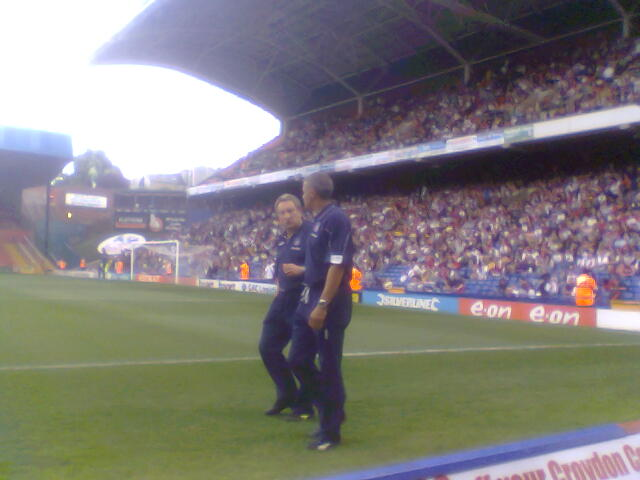
Curle (right) in 2008

=== Mansfield Town ===
Curle began his management career on 3 December 2002 after being appointed as player-manager of Mansfield Town, after the dismissal of Stuart Watkiss. He took over with the team struggling in the relegation zone and could not prevent the drop to the fourth tier, but took them to the play-off final in his first full season in charge, where they lost on penalties to Huddersfield Town.

In December 2004, he was controversially fired over claims that he had intimidated a member of the youth team. However, in August 2006, Curle won a case for wrongful dismissal against the club and was awarded undisclosed damages. The judge in the case cleared Curle of any wrongdoing, and described Mansfield's disciplinary process as a "sham".

=== Chester City ===
Despite the outcome of his hearing not yet being clear, he was appointed as manager of Chester City in May 2005 and began brightly with the club challenging for promotion from League Two and eliminating Nottingham Forest from the FA Cup. However, a disastrous losing run of 11 games in 12 cost Curle his job in February 2006 after just nine months in charge.

=== Torquay United ===
On 8 February 2007, he was appointed head coach (effectively manager under Director of Football Colin Lee, his former manager at Wolves) at Torquay United, where he had played earlier in his career. He was on a short-term contract that ended in the summer of 2007. After failing to save Torquay from relegation, Curle's contract was not renewed and he was replaced by Leroy Rosenior on 17 May 2007.

=== Coaching Roles ===
Curle reunited with Neil Warnock, when the latter was appointed manager of Championship side Crystal Palace in October 2007 and immediately brought Curle into his coaching team. Curle followed Warnock across London to Queens Park Rangers on 1 March 2010, again as coach. On 8 January 2012, he was sacked by the club with manager Warnock and assistant manager Mick Jones.

=== Notts County ===
On 20 February 2012, he was named as manager of Notts County. Curle made an impressive start to his reign at Notts County winning his first four games. He finished the 2011–12 season with Notts in seventh place, only missing out on the play-offs by goal difference. Curle's team made a good start to the 2012–13 season. A 2–2 draw with Oldham Athletic meant Curle equaled a 41-year record by going unbeaten away from home in the league in 10 consecutive games for the first time since 1971. The record was broken three days later when Notts County drew 1–1 with MK Dons. The run finally came to end on 27 January 2013 when Notts County were beaten 2–1 by Leyton Orient. Before that the team had gone 22 consecutive away games without defeat.

On 3 February 2013, Curle was sacked by Notts County.

=== Carlisle United ===
In September 2014, he was appointed as manager of Carlisle United, where he remained until the end of the 2017–18 season.

=== Northampton Town ===
On 1 October 2018, Curle was appointed manager at Northampton Town.

On 29 June 2020, Northampton Town won the League Two Play-Off Final under Curle, gaining him his first promotion with a club in the EFL as the Cobblers beat Exeter 4–0 at Wembley.

On 10 February 2021, Curle was sacked by Northampton Town with the club occupying 23rd place in League One, having endured a run of one win in 10 matches, and one goal scored in 2021.

=== Oldham Athletic ===
On 8 March 2021 Curle was appointed boss of League Two side Oldham Athletic following the sacking of Harry Kewell the day before. Curle left his position on 24 November 2021 with the club sitting in 22nd position in League Two, one place and two points above the relegation zone.

=== Hartlepool United ===
On 18 September 2022, Curle was appointed as the interim manager of League Two side Hartlepool United following the sacking of Paul Hartley earlier that day. At the time of his appointment, Hartlepool were winless in their first nine league games of the season and sat in 23rd place. On 3 December 2022, Curle was appointed as Hartlepool's permanent manager on a deal until the end of the 2023–24 season.

Curle was relieved of his duties on 22 February 2023. He won eight of 29 games during his tenure, leaving the side one point clear of the relegation zone but having played four more games than 23rd place Crawley Town. Hartlepool were later relegated at the end of the 2022–23 season.

=== Macclesfield ===
On 17 June 2026, Curle was appointed chief executive officer of National League North club Macclesfield.

== Managerial statistics ==
As of match played 21 February 2023

Managerial record by team and tenure
Team	From	To	Record					Ref.
Team	From	To	P	W	D	L	Win %	Ref.
Mansfield Town	3 December 2002	11 November 2004	104	39	23	42	37.5	
Chester City	2 May 2005	18 February 2006	39	12	10	17	30.8	
Torquay United	8 February 2007	17 May 2007	15	2	4	9	13.3	
Notts County	20 February 2012	3 February 2013	51	23	14	14	45.1	
Carlisle United	19 September 2014	5 May 2018	207	79	62	66	38.2	
Northampton Town	1 October 2018	10 February 2021	125	47	32	46	37.6	
Oldham Athletic	8 March 2021	24 November 2021	40	9	9	22	22.5	
Hartlepool United	18 September 2022	22 February 2023	29	7	7	15	24.1	
Total			610	218	161	231	35.7	

== Honours ==
=== Player ===
Bristol City

- Associate Members' Cup: 1985–86; runner-up: 1986–87

Reading

- Full Members' Cup: 1987–88

Individual

- Wolverhampton Wanderers Player of the Year: 1997–98

=== Manager ===
Northampton Town

- EFL League Two play-offs: 2020

Individual

- EFL League Two Manager of the Month: October 2016
