= Michael Dickson (disambiguation) =

Michael Dickson (born 1996) is an Australian gridiron football punter.

Michael Dickson may also refer to:

- Michael Dickson (Irish republican), Scottish former Provisional Irish Republican Army (IRA) volunteer
- Michael Dickson (engineer) (1944–2018), British structural engineer
- Michael Dickson (educator) (born 1977), executive director of StandWithUs Israel
- Michael Dickson (skier) (born 1975), Australian Olympic skier
- Michael Dickson (hurdler) (born 1994), American track and field sprint hurdler

== See also ==
- Michael Dixon (disambiguation)
