= Michael Gilkes =

Michael Gilkes may refer to:

- Michael Gilkes (footballer) (born 1965), English footballer
- Michael Gilkes (writer) (1933–2020), Guyanese critic, dramatist, filmmaker and university lecturer
