= Sean Reck =

English footballer

Personal information
- Date of birth: 5 May 1967 (age 59)
- Place of birth: Oxford, Oxfordshire, England
- Position: Midfielder

Youth career
- Oxford United

Senior career*
| Years | Team | Apps | (Gls) |
| 1984–1989 | Oxford United | 14 | (0) |
| 1985–1986 | → Newport County (loan) | 15 | (0) |
| 1986 | → Reading (loan) | 1 | (0) |
| 1989–1991 | Wrexham | 45 | (2) |
| 1991–1992 | Cheltenham Town | | |
- * Club domestic league appearances and goals

Sean Reck (born 5 May 1967) is an English former professional footballer who played as a midfielder.

== Career ==
Reck started his career at Oxford United, where he was loaned out to Newport County and Reading.

After leaving Oxford, he went to Wrexham and Cheltenham Town, retiring at the latter.
