= Andy Rogers (footballer) =

English footballer

Personal information
- Full name: Andrew Rogers
- Date of birth: 1 December 1956 (age 69)
- Place of birth: Chatteris, England
- Height: 5 ft 9 in (1.75 m)
- Position: Midfielder

Youth career
- Chatteris Town

Senior career*
Years	Team	Apps	(Gls)
1975–1978	Peterborough United	29	(1)
1980–1981	Southampton	5	(0)
1981–1985	Plymouth Argyle	163	(15)
1985–1986	Reading	44	(5)
1986–1988	Southend United	45	(2)
Total		286	(23)
- * Club domestic league appearances and goals

Andrew Rogers (born 1 December 1956) is an English former professional footballer. Rogers, a midfielder, is most noted for playing for Plymouth Argyle in the 1980s. He also played for Peterborough United, Southampton, Reading and Southend United.

== Playing career ==
Rogers began his career with local club Chatteris Town before being signed by Peterborough United in 1975. He was released in 1978 and spent a brief spell with non-league Hampton before joining Southampton in 1979. Rogers was signed by Plymouth Argyle in 1981 where he would be a prominent member of the first-team for the next four years, making 195 appearances in all competitions, scoring 19 goals. He featured for them in the 1983–84 FA Cup semi-final at Villa Park. He scored a remarkable goal in the quarter-finals against Derby County at the Baseball Ground, direct from a corner kick.

He was signed by Reading in the summer of 1985, where he would make 44 league appearances for the Elm Park side, scoring 5 goals, before spending a season with Southend United.

He saw out his career in non-league football, playing for Carshalton Athletic and then Farnborough Town.

== After football ==
Rogers now works as a probation officer in Devon. His son Gabriel Rogers is a footballer for Torquay United.

== Honours ==
Reading

- Football League Third Division: 1985–86
