= Colin Bailie =

Northern Ireland footballer (born 1964)

Personal information
- Full name: Colin James Bailie
- Date of birth: 31 March 1964 (age 62)
- Place of birth: Belfast, Northern Ireland
- Height: 5 ft 11 in (1.80 m)
- Positions: Full back; midfielder

Youth career
- Swindon Town

Senior career*
Years	Team	Apps	(Gls)
1982–1985	Swindon Town	107	(4)
1985–1988	Reading	84	(1)
1988–1992	Cambridge United	119	(3)
–	Eynesbury Rovers		
- * Club domestic league appearances and goals

Colin James Bailie (born 31 March 1964) is a former professional footballer, born in Belfast, Northern Ireland, who played in the Football League for Swindon Town, Reading and Cambridge United.

Bailie began his career at Swindon Town, where he turned professional in 1982. He made his debut in the Third Division 5–0 defeat at Oxford United on 7 April 1982, playing as a full back. He made 121 appearances for the club in all competitions, scoring 4 goals, before a move to Reading in 1985 for a fee of £22,500. While at Elm Park, he played a further 84 league games and played at Wembley as Reading reached the final of the Full Members Cup in 1988. Cambridge United paid £25,000 for his services in 1988, and when John Beck took over as manager in 1990, he converted Bailie to a midfielder, a position he played in as the club went on a run of successive promotions and FA Cup quarter-final appearances. In 1992, Bailie claimed he had lost his appetite for football and was quitting the game; he had a brief spell in non-league football with Eynesbury Rovers before moving to Cumbria to become a police officer.

== Honours ==
Reading

- Football League Third Division: 1985–86
- Full Members' Cup: 1987–88

Cambridge United

- Football League Third Division: 1990–91
- Football League Fourth Division play-offs: 1990
