= Dean Horrix =

English footballer

Personal information
- Full name: Dean Victor Horrix
- Date of birth: 21 November 1961
- Place of birth: Burnham, Buckinghamshire, England
- Date of death: 11 March 1990 (aged 28)
- Height: 5 ft 10 in (1.78 m)
- Position: Forward

Senior career*
Years	Team	Apps	(Gls)
1980–1983	Millwall	72	(19)
1983	Gillingham	14	(0)
1983–1988	Reading	158	(35)
1987	→ Cardiff City (loan)	9	(3)
1988–1990	Millwall	11	(1)
1990	Bristol City	3	(0)
- * Club domestic league appearances and goals

Dean Victor Horrix (21 November 1961 – 11 March 1990) was an English footballer.

He joined Millwall as a striker and made 65 league appearances plus 7 as substitute, scoring 19 goals, in the Football League Third Division. He was sold to Gillingham in 1983 and joined Reading later the same year. He formed a successful striking partnership with Trevor Senior and was very popular with the fans, helping the Royals win promotion to the Third Division in 1984 and the Second Division in 1986. He was also part of the team that won the Full Members' Cup in 1988, but were relegated from the Second Division in the same season. He then rejoined Millwall, who had just reached the Football League First Division, but was unable to break up the partnership of Tony Cascarino and Teddy Sheringham, and played just 11 league games in 18 months.

Horrix was sold to Bristol City in March 1990, but died the following week in a car crash while returning to his home in the Tadley area. His wife Carol, who was driving the car, survived. Horrix had played just three games for the club, who were on the verge of promotion to the Second Division.

== Honours ==
Reading

- Football League Third Division: 1985–86
