= Mick Tait =

English footballer, manager and scout

Personal information
- Full name: Michael Paul Tait
- Date of birth: 30 September 1956 (age 70)
- Place of birth: Wallsend, England
- Height: 5 ft 11 in (1.80 m)
- Positions: Defender; midfielder

Team information
- Current team: Newcastle United (scout)

Youth career
- Wallsend Boys Club

Senior career*
Years	Team	Apps	(Gls)
1974–1977	Oxford United	64	(23)
1977–1979	Carlisle United	106	(20)
1979–1980	Hull City	33	(3)
1980–1987	Portsmouth	240	(30)
1987–1990	Reading	99	(10)
1990–1992	Darlington	79	(2)
1992–1994	Hartlepool United	61	(1)
1994	Gretna	0	(0)
1994–1998	Hartlepool United	77	(2)
Total		769	(93)

Managerial career
- 1996–1999: Hartlepool United
- 1999–2000: Blyth Spartans
- 2002–2003: Darlington (caretaker)
- 2003: Darlington
- 2009: Newcastle Blue Star
- 2009–2011: Blyth Spartans
- * Club domestic league appearances and goals

Michael Tait (born 30 September 1956) is an English former professional footballer, manager and football scout who works for Premier League club Newcastle United.

During a playing career spanning more than two decades, he represented Oxford United, Carlisle United, Hull City, Portsmouth, Reading, Darlington and Hartlepool United in the Football League.

== Playing career ==
Born in Wallsend, Tait began his professional career with Oxford United in October 1974. He made 64 league appearances, including three as a substitute, and scored 23 goals before joining Carlisle United for £65,000 in February 1977.

Tait spent two and a half years at Carlisle, making 106 league appearances and scoring 20 goals. In September 1979, he joined Hull City for £150,000. He made 33 league appearances and scored three goals during his single season at Hull.

In June 1980, Tait moved to Portsmouth for £100,000. He spent seven years at the club, making 240 league appearances and scoring 30 goals. During his time at Portsmouth, the club won the Football League Third Division in 1982–83 and gained promotion to the First Division after finishing as runners-up in the Second Division in 1986–87.

Tait joined Reading for £50,000 in September 1987. He made 99 league appearances and scored ten goals before leaving for Darlington on a free transfer in August 1990.

At Darlington, Tait made 79 league appearances and scored twice. He was part of the team that won the Football League Fourth Division title in 1990–91.

In July 1992, Tait joined Hartlepool United on a free transfer. He made 61 league appearances during his first spell with the club before leaving in 1994. After a brief spell with Gretna, he returned to Hartlepool in September 1994 and remained registered as a player until 1998.

== Coaching and managerial career ==
=== Hartlepool United ===
While still registered as a player, Tait moved into coaching at Hartlepool United. In November 1996, following the departure of Keith Houchen, he was appointed manager of the club. He led Hartlepool to a 20th-place finish in the Third Division in his first season.

Tait remained in charge until January 1999. He also continued to be registered as a player during the early part of his managerial tenure; Hartlepool records him as the oldest player to represent the club, at 40 years and 173 days.

=== Blyth Spartans ===
Later in 1999, Tait was appointed manager of Blyth Spartans, succeeding John Gamble. He remained at Croft Park until 2000.

=== Darlington ===
Tait later returned to Darlington, initially working within the club's coaching structure. In 2002, he became caretaker manager and was subsequently appointed to the position on a permanent basis in 2003. His permanent spell ended later that year, when David Hodgson returned as manager.

Tait remained associated with Darlington after his spell as first-team manager, later working with the club's reserve side before leaving in 2008.

=== Newcastle Blue Star and return to Blyth Spartans ===
In 2009, Tait briefly worked with Newcastle Blue Star before returning to Blyth Spartans for a second spell as manager. Blyth appointed him on 9 May 2009 following the departure of Harry Dunn.

In an interview shortly after his appointment, Tait said that the club had changed considerably since his first spell, particularly in its financial position and infrastructure.

Tait remained in charge for two seasons. During his second spell, Blyth reached the quarter-finals of the FA Trophy and finished ninth in Conference North in 2010–11. He left the club at the end of that season when his contract was not renewed.

== Scouting career ==
=== Newcastle United ===
In 2012, Tait joined Newcastle United as a scout. He has continued to work in the club's scouting operation. In March 2024, Tait was reported to have attended a Championship match between Sunderland and Queens Park Rangers on behalf of Newcastle, amid reported interest in Sunderland midfielder Chris Rigg.

== Managerial statistics ==
Team	From	To	Record				
Team	From	To	G	W	L	D	Win %
Hartlepool United	November 1996	January 1999	115	33	37	45	28.7
Blyth Spartans	October 1999	May 2000					
Darlington (caretaker)	October 2002	June 2003	35	11	11	13	31.4
Darlington	June 2003	October 2003	19	5	11	3	26.3
Blyth Spartans	May 2009	May 2011					

== Honours ==
Portsmouth

- Football League Third Division: 1982–83
- Football League Second Division promotion: 1986–87

Reading

- Full Members' Cup: 1987–88

Darlington

- Football League Fourth Division: 1990–91
