= Mike Dixon (footballer, born 1943) =

English footballer

Personal information
- Full name: Michael George Dixon
- Date of birth: 12 October 1943
- Place of birth: Reading, England
- Date of death: 30 January 1993 (aged 49)
- Place of death: Hammersmith, England
- Position: Goalkeeper

Senior career*
Years	Team	Apps	(Gls)
1962–1969	Reading	113	(0)
1969–1971	Aldershot	38	(0)
	Salisbury City		(0)
Total		151	(0)

Managerial career
- Wokingham
- * Club domestic league appearances and goals

Michael George Dixon (12 October 1943 – 30 January 1993) was an English professional footballer who played as a goalkeeper. He later managed Wokingham.

== Career ==
Born in Reading, Dixon played for Reading, Aldershot and Salisbury City.
