= Mick Gooding =

English footballer and manager

Personal information
- Full name: Michael Charles Gooding
- Date of birth: 12 April 1959 (age 67)
- Place of birth: Newcastle upon Tyne, England
- Height: 5 ft 7 in (1.70 m)
- Position: Midfielder

Senior career*
Years	Team	Apps	(Gls)
1978–1979	Bishop Auckland		
1979–1982	Rotherham United	102	(10)
1982–1983	Chesterfield	12	(0)
1983–1987	Rotherham United	156	(33)
1987–1988	Peterborough United	47	(21)
1988–1989	Wolverhampton Wanderers	44	(4)
1989–1997	Reading	314	(26)
1998–1999	Southend United	25	(0)
Total		700	(94)

Managerial career
- 1994–1997: Reading
- 1999: Southend United
- 2000: Southend United
- * Club domestic league appearances and goals

Michael Charles Gooding (born 12 April 1959) is a former professional footballer and football manager.

In the twilight of a successful playing career, Gooding was appointed joint player-manager of Reading with Jimmy Quinn when manager Mark McGhee acrimoniously left to take the reins at Leicester City. Under their guidance, Reading finished second in the First Division but was left to battle for a place in the Premier League through the playoffs, as the Premier League was being reduced in size from 22 teams to 20. Reading were beaten 4-3 by Bolton Wanderers in the playoff final at Wembley.

Gooding and Quinn remained in charge at Elm Park for two seasons afterward, until they were replaced by Terry Bullivant after failing to mount any further promotion challenges.

After Reading, Gooding had a short spell at Southend United, before retiring from football. He remained at Roots Hall for a while as a coach.

He has since carved himself a career as a radio commentary pundit, performing such roles as co-commentator for BBC Radio Berkshire's coverage of Reading's league matches, while also working as an estate agent in Tadley.

Despite playing 700 league games in a career stretching 20 years, Gooding never played top-division football – the closest he came to reaching the top flight was with Reading when they narrowly missed out on promotion to the Premier League in 1995.

== Honours ==
Rotherham United

- Football League Third Division: 1980–81

Wolverhampton Wanderers

- Football League Third Division: 1988–89

Reading

- Football League Second Division: 1993–94

Individual

- PFA Team of the Year: 1987–88 Fourth Division
- Reading Player of the Year: 1991–92, 1992–93, 1995–96
