= Kevin Bremner =

Scottish footballer

Personal information
- Full name: Kevin Johnston Bremner
- Date of birth: 7 October 1957 (age 69)
- Place of birth: Banff, Scotland
- Height: 5 ft 9 in (1.75 m)
- Position: Striker

Senior career*
Years	Team	Apps	(Gls)
1976–1979	Deveronvale		
1979–1980	Keith		
1980–1983	Colchester United	95	(31)
1982	→ Birmingham City (loan)	4	(1)
1982–1983	→ Wrexham (loan)	4	(1)
1983	→ Plymouth Argyle (loan)	5	(1)
1983–1985	Millwall	96	(32)
1985–1987	Reading	64	(21)
1987–1990	Brighton & Hove Albion	128	(35)
1990–1991	Peterborough United	17	(3)
1991–1992	Dundee	24	(6)
1992	→ Shrewsbury Town (loan)	7	(2)
1992–1994	Brora Rangers		
1994–1995	Deveronvale		
1995	Gillingham	0	(0)

Managerial career
- 1992–1994: Brora Rangers (player-manager)
- 1994–1995: Deveronvale (player-manager)
- * Club domestic league appearances and goals

Kevin Johnston Bremner (born 7 October 1957) is a Scottish former professional footballer who played as a striker. He made nearly 450 appearances in the English and Scottish Football Leagues, representing ten different clubs.

== Football career ==
Bremner was born in Banff, which is now in Aberdeenshire. He began his senior career as an 18-year-old with home-town club Deveronvale of the Highland League; he had been with the club since he was 14 years of age. In the 1977–78 season, he was part of the team which defeated Huntly to win the Bell's Cup; he finished the season as leading scorer with 27 goals and won the club's player of the year award. Celtic manager Billy McNeill had invited him for a two-week trial, but no contract offer ensued and Bremner left Deveronvale for fellow Highland League club Keith.

In October 1980 he moved to England to join Colchester United of the Third Division for a fee of £40,000; that season Colchester were relegated to the Fourth Division. Bremner played more than 100 matches for the club in all competitions, and during the 1982–83 season he spent short periods on loan at Birmingham City, Wrexham and Plymouth Argyle, scoring a goal for each. In February 1983 he joined Millwall for £25,000. His first goal for the club gave him the distinction of having played and scored in the Football League for five different clubs in the same season.

Bremner played more than 100 games in all competitions for Millwall, helping them gain promotion to the Second Division as Third Division runners-up. At the beginning of the 1985–86 season he joined Reading; as the clubs were unable to agree on a transfer fee, the Football League tribunal valued his services at £35,000. In his second season at the club, he contributed to Reading winning the Third Division title, before joining Brighton & Hove Albion, where for the third time in four seasons he played his part in his club gaining promotion from the Third Division. He finished the season as the club's leading scorer, with 12 goals in all competitions.

He spent a season at Peterborough United before returning to Scotland where he signed for Dundee, contributing to their First Division title in 1991–92. A short spell on loan at Shrewsbury Town preceded his first foray into management, as player-manager of Highland League club Brora Rangers. He then rejoined Deveronvale as player-manager for one season, in which he was leading goalscorer with 17 goals and managed them to victory in the Aberdeenshire Shield.

Bremner returned to England to take up a coaching role at Gillingham, where he became youth team manager, but was made redundant in April 2003 along with other staff as a cost-cutting measure. He made one playing appearance for the club in 1995 in a Football League Trophy match.

His older brother Des was also a prominent professional footballer, with Hibernian, Aston Villa and Birmingham City.

== Honours ==
=== Player ===
Deveronvale

- Bell's Cup: 1977–78
- Aberdeenshire Shield: 1994–95

Millwall

- Football League Third Division runner-up: 1984–85

Reading

- Football League Third Division: 1985–86

Brighton & Hove Albion

- Football League Third Division runner-up: 1987–88

Peterborough United

- Football League Fourth Division promoted: 1990–91

Dundee

- Scottish First Division: 1991–92

Individual

- Deveronvale Player of the Year: 1977–78

=== Manager ===
Deveronvale

- Aberdeenshire Shield: 1994–95
