= Gary Peters (footballer) =

English footballer and manager (born 1954)

Personal information
- Full name: Gary David Peters
- Date of birth: 3 August 1954 (age 72)
- Place of birth: Carshalton, England
- Height: 5 ft 11 in (1.80 m)
- Position: Defender

Youth career
- 1972–1975: Aldershot

Senior career*
Years	Team	Apps	(Gls)
1975–1979	Reading	156	(7)
1979–1982	Fulham	64	(2)
1982–1984	Wimbledon	83	(7)
1984–1985	Aldershot	17	(1)
1985–1988	Reading	100	(4)
1988–1990	Fulham	11	(2)
Total		431	(23)

Managerial career
- 1994–1998: Preston North End
- 2003: Exeter City
- 2004–2008: Shrewsbury Town
- * Club domestic league appearances and goals

Gary David Peters (born 3 August 1954) is an English former professional footballer and now manager. His last position was with Shrewsbury Town in from 2004 to 2008.

== Playing career ==
Peters had a moderately successful playing career as a defender including spells at Aldershot (twice), Reading (twice), Fulham (twice) and Wimbledon. Originally rejected as a trainee at Aldershot, he began his career at Southern League Guildford City before moving on to Reading as a right-back in 1975, winning promotion to Division 3 in his first season. After failing to agree terms on a contract extension, Peters left the club in 1979, having made 156 appearances.

Between March and August 1979, Gary was one of the Reading back five that kept a clean sheet for 1,103 minutes – a record that stood until broken by Manchester Utd.

A Football League tribunal decided upon a transfer fee of £25,000 as Peters moved to Fulham. After 64 appearances for the club, Peters then joined Wimbledon, who had spent the previous four years moving between the third and fourth divisions, after being elected into the Football League in 1977. In his first full season for The Dons (1982–83) Peters helped the club to promotion as Fourth Division champions. The following year Wimbledon, with Peters now club captain, won promotion again and reached Division Two. However, he did not play for the club at this higher level as he was released to join fourth division Aldershot.

Peters rejoined his original club, Aldershot, for the 1984–85 season, where he played in central defence. However, he stayed for just one campaign, in which he made only 23 appearances, before leaving to rejoin Reading. His first season back at Elm Park saw the club clinch promotion to Division Two. Peters made nearly a hundred appearances for The Royals in his second spell, where he also coached the youth team. He returned to Fulham, and played sporadically over two further seasons before retiring in 1990.

== Management career ==
=== Preston ===
Following his retirement as player, Peters took on roles as assistant manager at Fulham, Cambridge and Preston North End. After the departure of John Beck in late 1993–94, Peters was promoted to manager at Preston, who at the time were third from bottom of Division Three. Under Beck, Preston had played the long-ball system, but with Peters in charge the team played a more attractive passing game. He also changed their fortunes, as Preston won promotion to Division Two in 1996. During his time at Preston, Peters brought in players such as David Beckham (on loan) and Jon Macken. In 1997, he sold Kevin Kilbane for a club record fee of £1.2m. Jon Macken would eventually be sold by the club for another record, £5m, after scoring more than 70 goals for the club.

In early 1998, with Preston sinking back towards Division Three, and having finished fifteenth two years running, Peters resigned and David Moyes was promoted to become their new manager. A month later, after considering his future, Peters rejoined Preston as the club's Centre of Excellence Manager. He set about developing the club's Centre of Excellence, nurturing the talents of local 9- to 16-year-olds. Recent graduates of the Preston academy include Paul McKenna and Andrew Lonergan. But with the Centre of Excellence ticking over, Preston chose to make Peters redundant, in a cost-cutting measure.

=== Exeter City ===
Exeter City quickly secured his services and issued him with the challenge, with just 13 matches of the 2002–03 season remaining, of preserving their league status. Peters lost this challenge, but Exeter lost only three of those 13 games. With the club in financial turmoil, the chairman and vice-chairman both resigned after they had been arrested as part of an investigation of club finances. Possibly facing a large points penalty for going into administration, having to release a large number of the playing staff and being unable to sign any new players, Peters resigned four days later. Peters joined Everton, where David Moyes was now manager, as a scout.

=== Shrewsbury Town ===
On 15 November 2004, Peters took over the reins at Shrewsbury Town. The club had been promoted out of the Football Conference in the summer of 2004 under Jimmy Quinn but were struggling in the newly titled "League Two", and had been knocked out of the FA Cup by non-league Histon.

Peters appointed the much-travelled Mick Wadsworth as his assistant in January 2005, and Shrewsbury finished 21st out of 24 that season, 11 points above the relegated Kidderminster. Going into the 2005–06 season, Shrewsbury were favourites for relegation, and after a poor start to the season it looked a likelihood. But Peters turned Shrewsbury's fortunes upwards, with the club even knocking Football League Championship club Brighton out of the League Cup and taking Sheffield United, also of the Championship, to a penalty shootout in the same competition. Towards the end of the season, a consistently good run of results gave Town a chance of reaching the play-offs, though the club eventually finishing tenth.

Despite being linked with the vacant managerial post at League One Tranmere Rovers, Peters agreed a two-year extension to his contract on 17 May 2006, which now ran until the end of the 2008–09 season. He finished the 2006–07 season by taking Shrewsbury to the play-off final at the new Wembley Stadium, after knocking out the highly fancied Milton Keynes Dons. However, Town lost 3–1 to Bristol Rovers in the final, ensuring another season in the fourth tier.

The 2007–08 season saw Peters managing the club at its new home, New Meadow. However, the new location failed to bring a positive effect on the field as the club faltered after a bright start. On 3 March 2008, after collecting just 6 points from 12 matches, Peters parted company with the club by mutual consent. His final game had been a 4–1 defeat at Barnet and was less than a season after a Wembley appearance.

On 4 October 2011, Peters was appointed Director of Football at League Two club Hereford United, a local rival of Shrewsbury. He left the club on 29 October 2012 after his role was made redundant following their relegation.

== Managerial career ==
(Correct as of 3 March 2008)

Gary Peters		League						Cups/Playoffs				Total			
Club	Season	Position	Played	Won	Drew	Lost	Points Average	Played	Won	Drew	Lost	Played	Won	Drew	Lost
Preston; North; End	1994–95	4th in Div.3 (IV)	25	15	8	2	2.12	4	0	1	3	29	15	9	5
Preston; North; End	1995–96	1st in Div. 3 (IV)	46	23	17	6	1.87	4	1	1	2	50	24	18	8
Preston; North; End	1996–97	15th in Div. 2 (III)	46	18	7	21	1.33	6	2	2	2	52	20	9	23
Preston; North; End	1997–98	Did not finish	21	8	4	9	1.33	7	5	1	1	28	13	5	10
December 1994 – January 1998			138	64	36	38	1.65	21	8	5	8	159	72	41	46
Exeter City	2002–03	23rd in Div. 3 (IV)	13	5	5	3	1.54	-	-	-	-	13	5	5	3
February – May 2003			13	5	5	3	1.54	-	-	-	-	13	5	5	3
Shrewsbury; Town	2004–05	21st in Lge.Two (IV)	29	11	10	8	1.48	-	-	-	-	29	11	10	8
Shrewsbury; Town	2005–06	10th in Lge.Two (IV)	46	16	13	17	1.33	5	2	1	2	51	18	14	19
Shrewsbury; Town	2006–07	7th in Lge.Two (IV)	46	18	17	11	1.54	10	4	2	4	56	22	19	15
Shrewsbury; Town	2007–08	Did not finish	34	11	7	16	1.18	4	1	0	3	38	12	7	19
November 2004 – March 2008			155	56	47	52	1.39	19	7	3	9	174	60	50	64
Total			259	107	77	74	1.54	33	13	7	13	353	137	97	119

== Honours ==
=== As a player ===
Wimbledon

- Football League Fourth Division: 1982–83

Reading

- Football League Third Division: 1985–86
- Full Members' Cup: 1987–88

=== As a manager ===
Preston North End

- Football League Third Division: 1995–96
