= Steve Wood (footballer, born February 1963) =

English footballer

Personal information
- Full name: Stephen Alan Wood
- Date of birth: 2 February 1963 (age 63)
- Place of birth: Bracknell, England
- Height: 6 ft 0 in (1.83 m)
- Position: Central defender

Senior career*
Years	Team	Apps	(Gls)
1981–1987	Reading	219	(9)
1987–1991	Millwall	110	(0)
1991–1994	Southampton	46	(0)
1994–1996	Oxford United	13	(0)
	Woking	8	(0)
Total		388	(9)
- * Club domestic league appearances and goals

Steve Wood (born 2 February 1963) is an English former football defender.

Wood started his career as an apprentice at Arsenal but was then snapped up by Reading for whom he had eight successful years gaining promotion to the Second Division. He then moved to Millwall for £85,000, and finally onto Southampton for £400,000. He had a brief spells at Oxford United and Woking in the latter part of his career then retired.

He now runs his own football representation company, Midas Sports.

== Career statistics ==
Appearances and goals by club, season and competition
Club	Season	League			FA Cup		League Cup		Other		Total	
Club	Season	Division	Apps	Goals	Apps	Goals	Apps	Goals	Apps	Goals	Apps	Goals
Reading
Reading	1979–80	Third Division	2	0	0	0	0	0	—		2	0
Reading	1980–81	Third Division	6	0	0	0	0	0	—		6	0
Reading	1981–82	Third Division	32	0	1	0	1	0	1 (Note: Appearances in Group Cup)	0	35	0
Reading	1982–93	Third Division	18	0	1	0	2	0	2	0	23	0
Reading	1983–84	Fourth Division	37	3	3	0	1	0	—		41	3
Reading	1984–85	Third Division	46	1	3	0	2	0	2 (Note: Appearances in Associate Members' Cup)	0	53	1
Reading	1985–86	Third Division	46	4	6	0	2	0	1	0	55	4
Reading	1986–87	Second Division	32	1	1	0	2	0	1 (Note: Appearances in Full Members' Cup)	0	36	1
Reading	Total		219	9	15	0	10	0	7	0	251	9
Millwall
Millwall	1987–88	Second Division	22	0	0	0	2	0	2	0	26	0
Millwall	1988–89	First Division	35	0	2	0	2	0	1	0	40	0
Millwall	1989–90	First Division	21	0	5	0	2	0	—		28	0
Millwall	1990–91	Second Division	25	0	3	0	3	0	1	0	32	0
Millwall	1991–92	Second Division	7	0	0	0	1	0	—		8	0
Millwall	Total		110	0	10	0	10	0	4	0	134	0
Southampton
Southampton	1991–92	First Division	15	0	1	1	0	0	4	0	20	1
Southampton	1992–93	Premier League	4	0	0	0	1	0	—		5	0
Southampton	1993–94	Premier League	27	0	1	0	2	0	—		30	0
Southampton	Total		46	0	2	1	3	0	4	0	55	1
Oxford United
Oxford United	1994–95	Second Division	2	0	0	0	0	0	1	0	3	0
Oxford United	1995–96	Second Division	11	0	3	2	0	0	2	0	16	2
Oxford United	Total		13	0	3	2	0	0	3	0	19	2
Career total			388	9	30	3	23	0	18	0	459	12

== Honours ==
Reading

- Football League Third Division: 1985–86

Southampton

- Full Members Cup runner-up: 1991–92
