= Gordon Cumming =

Scottish footballer

Personal information
- Full name: Gordon Robert Riddell Cumming
- Date of birth: 23 January 1948 (age 78)
- Place of birth: Johnstone, Scotland
- Position: Winger

Youth career
- Glasgow United

Senior career*
Years	Team	Apps	(Gls)
1961-1963	Eaglesham Amateurs		
1963–1969	Arsenal	0	(0)
1969–1977	Reading	331	(61)
- * Club domestic league appearances and goals

Gordon Cumming is a Scottish former footballer who played as a winger for English clubs Arsenal and Reading.

== Career ==
Cumming was born on 23 January 1948 in Johnstone, Scotland. His primary position was as a winger. He started his playing career at Scottish team Glasgow United. Before moving to Arsenal Cumming played for successful amateur team Eaglesham Amateurs, where his family lived. Cumming then moved to London, joining Arsenal where he won the FA Youth Cup in 1966. He then spent the next three years at Highbury before moving to Reading in 1969. There, he was the primary taker of penalties until the arrivals of Robin Friday and Alan Taylor. He was Reading's player of the year in 1971–72. In 1975–76, Cumming played in the Reading team that won promotion to the Third Division. In all, he scored 61 goals in 331 games for the Royals.

== Personal life ==
Cumming retired from football in 1978 and went on to open a restaurant. Cumming is married to wife Christina and has two daughters, Susan and Amanda.

== Honours ==
=== Club ===
Arsenal

- FA Youth Cup: 1966

=== Individual ===
- Reading FC Player of the Year.
