= Mark White (footballer, born 1958) =

English footballer

Personal information
- Full name: Mark Ivan White
- Date of birth: 26 October 1958 (age 68)
- Place of birth: Sheffield, England
- Height: 5 ft 10 in (1.78 m)
- Position: Left back

Youth career
- Sheffield United

Senior career*
Years	Team	Apps	(Gls)
1977–1988	Reading	278	(11)
Total		278	(11)
- * Club domestic league appearances and goals

Mark Ivan White (born 26 October 1958) is an English former professional footballer who played as a left back.

== Career ==
Born in Sheffield, White played for Sheffield United and Reading.

Between March and August 1979, White was one of the Reading back five that kept a clean sheet for 1,103 minutes – a record that stood until broken by Manchester United.

== Honours ==
Reading

- Football League Third Division: 1985–86
