= Pat Earles =

English footballer

Personal information
- Full name: Patrick John Earles
- Date of birth: 22 March 1955 (age 71)
- Place of birth: Titchfield, Hampshire, England
- Height: 5 ft 7 in (1.70 m)
- Position: Forward

Youth career
- 1970–1972: Southampton

Senior career*
Years	Team	Apps	(Gls)
1972–1977	Southampton	12	(1)
1977–1982	Reading	247	(68)
Total		259	(69)

International career
1970	England Schoolboys	1	(0)
- * Club domestic league appearances and goals

Patrick John Earles (born 22 March 1955 in Titchfield, Hampshire) is an English former footballer who played as a forward in the Football League for Southampton and Reading. He was a member of the Southampton squad which reached the 1976 FA Cup Final, and made over 250 appearances for Reading, scoring 85 goals, and helped the club win the Fourth Division title in 1979. He then had a spell playing non-league football, with clubs including Road-Sea Southampton and Bognor Regis Town.

Earles went on to work as a probation officer for Hampshire Probation Service.
