= Steve Death =

English footballer

Personal information
- Full name: Stephen Victor Death
- Date of birth: 19 September 1949
- Place of birth: Norton, England
- Date of death: 26 October 2003 (aged 54)
- Place of death: Reading, England
- Height: 1.70 m (5 ft 7 in)
- Position: Goalkeeper

Youth career
- 1967–1969: West Ham United

Senior career*
Years	Team	Apps	(Gls)
1969	West Ham United	1	(0)
1969–1982	Reading	471	(0)
- * Club domestic league appearances and goals

Stephen Victor Death (19 September 1949 – 26 October 2003) was an English football goalkeeper who played for Reading for almost the entirety of his career. Death was one of the longest-serving players to appear for Reading. He has been described as "Reading's greatest ever goalkeeper".

== Career ==
=== West Ham United ===
Death was an England schoolboy international who made one League appearance for West Ham United on 30 April 1969 in a 1–1 away draw with Manchester City covering for regular goalkeeper Bobby Ferguson. Death had originally joined West Ham as an apprentice in 1967 but by 1969 found his opportunities for first team football blocked by Ferguson and Peter Grotier.

=== Reading ===
He joined Reading in 1969 and went straight into the team as first choice goalkeeper, and despite being only 5 ft 7 in (1.70 m), the smallest goalkeeper in the Football League, he made the position his own for the next ten years with a total of 537 first team appearances. There were doubts about his height as a goalkeeper immediately on joining Reading. He made his debut on 8 November 1969 in a 1–0 win against Brighton after which the press described him as "an insignificantly built bundle of daredevil energy". Doubts about his height resurfaced after the next game on 22 November 1969 a 6–2 defeat by Southport but Death continued to win the popularity of Reading fans so as to be named their player of the season in his first season for the club.

Death set many other records during his time at Elm Park. He was elected Player of the Season four times for seasons 1969/70, 1972/73, 1973/74 and 1976/77, won PFA Divisional Awards in 1973–74 and 1978–79, collected a Division Four Championship plaque in 1978–79, kept 26 clean sheets in that season, and at one stage made 156 consecutive first team appearances; this remains a club record. Death held the record of 1,074 minutes without conceding a goal in English league football, before Manchester United's Edwin van der Sar broke the record against Everton on 31 January 2009.

== After football ==
Death was given a testimonial in the 1979–80 season, with over 7,000 watching his Testimonial Match against a Young England XI managed by his former manager at West Ham, Ron Greenwood. He left the game in 1982 and returned to his native Suffolk. He subsequently returned to Reading to work as a greenkeeper at Mapledurham local golf course.

== Death ==
Death died of cancer in 2003, aged 54 in the Duchess of Kent Hospice, Reading. He was survived by his partner, Sharon and his children Justin, Amber and Alexandria.
