= Martin Hicks =

English footballer

Personal information
- Date of birth: 27 February 1957 (age 69)
- Place of birth: Stratford-on-Avon, England
- Height: 6 ft 3 in (1.91 m)
- Position: Defender

Senior career*
Years	Team	Apps	(Gls)
19??–1977	Stratford Town		
1977–1978	Charlton Athletic	0	(0)
1978–1991	Reading	500	(23)
1991–1993	Birmingham City	60	(1)
1993–1995	Newbury Town		

Managerial career
- 1993–1995: Newbury Town (player-manager)
- * Club domestic league appearances and goals

Martin Hicks (born 27 February 1957) is a former footballer who played in the Football League as a defender for Reading and Birmingham City. He made 500 League appearances for Reading.

Hicks holds the record for the highest number of first team appearances by a Reading player, making a total of 603 first team appearances.

In a 2005 fans' vote to compile Reading's best-ever eleven, Hicks was voted on the team as one of the centre backs.

Between March and August 1979, Hicks was one of the Reading back five that kept a clean sheet for 1,103 minutes – a record that stood until broken by Manchester United.

After leaving Reading he joined Birmingham City, and was their Player of the Year for 1992.

== Honours ==
Reading

- Football League Third Division: 1985–86
- Full Members' Cup: 1987–88
