= Steve Richardson (footballer) =

English footballer

Personal information
- Date of birth: 11 February 1962 (age 64)
- Place of birth: Slough, England
- Height: 5 ft 5 in (1.65 m)
- Position: Left back

Senior career*
Years	Team	Apps	(Gls)
1980–1982	Southampton	0	(0)
1982–1993	Reading	380	(3)
1993–1995	Newbury Town		
1995–2000	Basingstoke Town	147	(1)

Managerial career
- 2008: Basingstoke Town (caretaker)
- * Club domestic league appearances and goals

Steve Richardson (born 11 February 1962) is an English former professional footballer who played as a left back, making over 300 career appearances.

== Career ==
Born in Slough, Richardson played for Southampton, Reading and Newbury Town. He joined Basingstoke in 1995, playing for them until 2000. During his time as a player he became a coach, a job he held until becoming assistant manager in 2006.

He became caretaker manager at Basingstoke in March 2008, but left the club at the end of the season to become assistant manager at Farnborough.

== Honours ==
Reading

- Football League Third Division: 1985–86
- Full Members' Cup: 1987–88
