= Jerry Williams (footballer) =

English footballer

Personal information
- Date of birth: 24 March 1960 (age 66)
- Place of birth: Didcot, England
- Height: 5 ft 11 in (1.80 m)
- Position: Midfielder

Senior career*
Years	Team	Apps	(Gls)
1976–1988	Reading	309	(17)
1988–1989	Gillingham	13	(0)
1989–1991	Aldershot	67	(7)
- Windsor & Eton
Total		389	(24)
- * Club domestic league appearances and goals

Jerry Williams (born 24 March 1960) is an English former professional footballer who played as a midfielder.

== Career ==
Born in Didcot, Williams played in the Football League for Reading, Gillingham and Aldershot, before playing non-league football for Windsor & Eton.

== Honours ==
Reading

- Football League Third Division: 1985–86
- Full Members' Cup: 1987–88
