= 1987–88 Full Members' Cup =

Tournament details
- Country: England
- Teams: 40

Final positions
- Champions: Reading (1st title)
- Runners-up: Luton Town
- Semifinalists: Coventry City; Swindon Town

Tournament statistics
- Matches played: 39
- Goals scored: 119 (3.05 per match)

The 1987–88 Full Members' Cup, known as the Simod Cup for sponsorship reasons, was the third edition of the tournament created to compensate for the ban on English clubs from European football following the Heysel Stadium disaster. It was won by Reading, who beat Luton Town 4–1 in the final at Wembley.

Arsenal, Liverpool, Manchester United and Tottenham opted out of this competition.

== First round ==
10 November 1987	Blackburn Rovers (2)	1–2	Swindon Town (2)	Ewood Park

10 November 1987	Charlton Athletic (1)	1–1 (a.e.t.) (4–2 p)	Hull City (2)	The Valley

10 November 1987	Ipswich Town (2)	1–0	Middlesbrough (2)	Portman Road

10 November 1987	Leicester City (2)	1–0	Huddersfield Town (2)	Filbert Street

10 November 1987	Manchester City (2)	6–2	Plymouth Argyle (2)	Maine Road

10 November 1987	Oldham Athletic (2)	0–3	West Bromwich Albion (2)	Boundary Park

10 November 1987	Portsmouth (1)	0–3	Stoke City (2)	Fratton Park
			Heath; Daly; Shaw	Attendance: 3,226

10 November 1987	Sheffield Wednesday (1)	2–0	Bournemouth (2)	Hillsborough Stadium

10 November 1987	West Ham United (1)	1–2	Millwall (2)	Boleyn Ground

11 November 1987	Aston Villa (2)	0–5	Bradford City (2)	Villa Park

11 November 1987	Oxford United (1)	1–0	Crystal Palace (2)	Manor Ground

18 November 1987	Chelsea (1)	2–1	Barnsley (2)	Stamford Bridge
	Durie 65'; Coady 82'		MacDonald 39'	Attendance: 8,501; Referee: Mike D. Reed

25 November 1987	Derby County (1)	3–1 (a.e.t.)	Birmingham City (2)	Baseball Ground

25 November 1987	Leeds United (2)	3–0	Sheffield United (2)	Elland Road

25 November 1987	Newcastle United (1)	2–1	Shrewsbury Town (2)	St James' Park

21 December 1987	Queens Park Rangers (1)	1–3	Reading (2)	Loftus Road

== Second round ==
1 December 1987	Charlton Athletic (1)	1–2 (a.e.t.)	Leicester City (2)	The Valley

1 December 1987	Ipswich Town (2)	2–1	West Bromwich Albion (2)	Portman Road

1 December 1987	Sheffield Wednesday (1)	0–1	Stoke City (2)	Hillsborough Stadium
			Berry	Attendance: 15,228

2 December 1987	Bradford City (2)	2–1	Newcastle United (1)	Valley Parade

8 December 1987	Millwall (2)	2–0	Leeds United (2)	The Den

16 December 1987	Manchester City (2)	0–2	Chelsea (1)	Maine Road
			K. Wilson 67'; Dixon 88'	Attendance: 6,406; Referee: Trelford Mills

23 December 1987	Swindon Town (2)	2–1	Derby County (1)	County Ground

13 January 1988	Reading (2)	1–0	Oxford United (1)	Elm Park

== Third round ==
13 January 1988	Coventry City (1)	2–1	Wimbledon (1)	Highfield Road

13 January 1988	Leicester City (2)	0–0 (3–5 p)	Stoke City (2)	Filbert Street
				Attendance: 5,161

13 January 1988	Millwall (2)	2–3	Norwich City (1)	The Den

13 January 1988	Swindon Town (2)	4–0	Chelsea (1)	County Ground
	Parkin 7'; White 8', 63'; Quinn 43'			Attendance: 12,317; Referee: Allan Gunn

25 January 1988	Bradford City (2)	1–0	Southampton (1)	Valley Parade

25 January 1988	Ipswich Town (2)	5–2 (a.e.t.)	Watford (1)	Portman Road

3 February 1988	Reading (2)	2–1 (a.e.t.)	Nottingham Forest (1)	Elm Park

10 February 1988	Everton (1)	1–2	Luton Town (1)	Goodison Park
	Power 20'		Oldfield (2) 61', 83'

== Quarter-final ==
9 February 1988

Coventry City (1)	2–0	Ipswich Town (2)

10 February 1988

Reading (2)	2–1 (a.e.t.)	Bradford City (2)
Baillie; Horrix

23 February 1988

Swindon Town (2)	2–0	Norwich City (1)

1 March 1988

Luton Town (1)	4–1	Stoke City (2)
Harford (2); B. Stein (2)		Shaw

Attendance: 4,480

== Semi-final ==
2 March 1988

Reading (2)	1–1 (a.e.t.)	Coventry City (1)
Smillie 57'		Speedie 79'
Penalties
Curle (penalty missed); Beavon (penalty scored); Horrix (penalty scored); Williams (penalty scored); Gilkes (penalty scored)	4–3	Kilcline (penalty scored); Downs (penalty scored); Sedgley (penalty missed); Smith (penalty scored); Bennett (penalty missed)

Elm Park, Reading
Attendance: ~15,000
8 March 1988

Luton Town (1)	2–1 (a.e.t.)	Swindon Town (2)

Kenilworth Road

== Final ==
27 March 1988	Reading (2)	4–1	Luton Town (1)	Wembley Stadium
	Smillie; Gilkes; Tait; Beavon		Harford	Attendance: 61,470
