= Stuart Beavon (footballer, born 1958) =

English footballer (born 1958)

Personal information
- Full name: Michael Stuart Beavon
- Date of birth: 30 November 1958 (age 67)
- Place of birth: Wolverhampton, England
- Height: 5 ft 6 1/2 in (1.69 m)
- Position: Midfielder

Senior career*
Years	Team	Apps	(Gls)
1978–1980	Tottenham Hotspur	4	(0)
1979–1980	→ Notts County (loan)	6	(0)
1980–1990	Reading	396	(44)
1990–1993	Northampton Town	98	(14)
	Newbury Town	?	(?)
- * Club domestic league appearances and goals

Michael Stuart Beavon (born 30 November 1958) is an English former footballer.

== Career ==
=== Tottenham Hotspur ===
Beavon started his football career as an apprentice with Tottenham Hotspur. He then joined the first-team squad in 1978, and spent time on loan at Notts County for the 1979-80 season.

=== Reading ===
Beavon joined Reading in 1980. Here, he made a total of 396 league appearances, scoring 44 goals.

=== Northampton Town ===
Beavon joined Northampton Town in 1990. He made a total of 98 league appearances and 14 goals.

=== Newbury Town ===
Beavon joined Newbury Town in 1993.

== Personal life ==
He is the son of the former late footballer Cyril Beavon. He is also the father of football player Stuart Beavon. He is now working as a Self-Employed Painter.

== Honours ==
Reading

- Football League Third Division: 1985–86
- Full Members' Cup: 1987–88
