= Trevor Senior =

English footballer and manager

Personal information
- Full name: Trevor John Senior
- Date of birth: 28 November 1961 (age 64)
- Place of birth: Stratton, Dorset, England
- Height: 6 ft 1 in (1.85 m)
- Position: Striker

Team information
- Current team: Dorchester Town (assistant manager)

Youth career
- Dorchester Town

Senior career*
Years	Team	Apps	(Gls)
1981	Dorchester Town		
1981–1983	Portsmouth	11	(2)
1982–1983	→ Aldershot (loan)	10	(7)
1983–1987	Reading	164	(102)
1987–1988	Watford	24	(1)
1988	Middlesbrough	10	(2)
1988–1992	Reading	137	(51)
1992–1993	Woking	31	(11)
1993	Dorchester Town		
1993–1994	Farnborough Town		
1995–1996	Farnborough Town		

Managerial career
- 1995: Weymouth
- ?–2000: Bridport
- 2001: Bashley
- 2001–2006: Bridgwater Town
- 2009–2016: Bridport
- * Club domestic league appearances and goals

Trevor Senior (born 28 November 1961) is a former professional footballer who played as a striker, primarily at Reading. He is the assistant manager of Dorchester Town.

== Playing career ==
Senior was born in Stratton, near Dorchester, Dorset. He started his career at Dorchester Town. He joined Portsmouth in 1981 for £35,000, and then (after a loan spell with Aldershot) moved to Reading where he scored 184 goals in 362 league and cup appearances in two spells between 1983 and 1992. In season 1983–84, when Reading won promotion from the Fourth Division, Senior was top scorer in all four divisions of the Football League with 36 goals in the league and a total of 41 in all competitions. Two years later he scored 27 times in the Third Division campaign as Reading won another promotion, this time as champions of their division.

In March 1988 Senior signed for Middlesbrough on transfer deadline day for a fee of £200,000 from Watford, where he had moved in July 1987. After making just ten league appearances for Boro and being part of their Second Division promotion winning team, Senior moved back to Reading in October 1988. Despite his time on Teesside being seen generally as a disappointment, Senior was instrumental in Boro's promotion in May 1988 after scoring two important goals in the play-offs.

After he left Reading for a second time in 1992, and making his last Football League appearance at the age of 30, Senior spent a season with non-league Woking, and then a short spell at Dorchester Town before signing in November 1993 for Farnborough Town.

== Managerial and coaching career ==
The following season Senior became manager of Weymouth and subsequently during 1995–96 had another spell at Farnborough. He managed Bridgwater Town in the Western Football League, before joining Dorchester, and becoming the Under 18's manager. His last game as U-18's manager was in May 2008.

Senior was appointed manager of Western League Division One Bridport on 15 June 2009 following the resignation of Ian Hutchinson.

== Honours ==
Reading

- Football League Third Division: 1985–86

Middlesbrough

- Football League Second Division play-offs: 1988
