= History of Reading F.C. =

History of an English football club

Reading's progress through the English football league system from 1920 to present

The history of Reading Football Club covers almost 150 years of both success and failure of the football club from Reading, England. The club was established in 1871, making it one of the oldest professional teams in England. Reading joined the Football League in 1920. The Royals competed at the top flight of English football for the first time in the 2006–07 season.

== Early years (1871–1941) ==
Reading Football Club was formed on 25 December 1871 by founder Joseph Edward Sydenham. They were originally nicknamed The Biscuitmen after one of the main trades in the town, Huntley & Palmers biscuits, but changed to the Royals in the 1970s, when the company closed their factory. This history is reflected in the name of the club's unofficial fanzine, Hob Nob Anyone?, named after a popular British biscuit.

The switch to professionalism in 1895 resulted in the need for a bigger ground and, to this end, the club moved again, to the purpose-built Elm Park on 5 September 1896.

...without doubt, Reading FC are the finest foreign team seen in Italy.

— Corriere della Sera

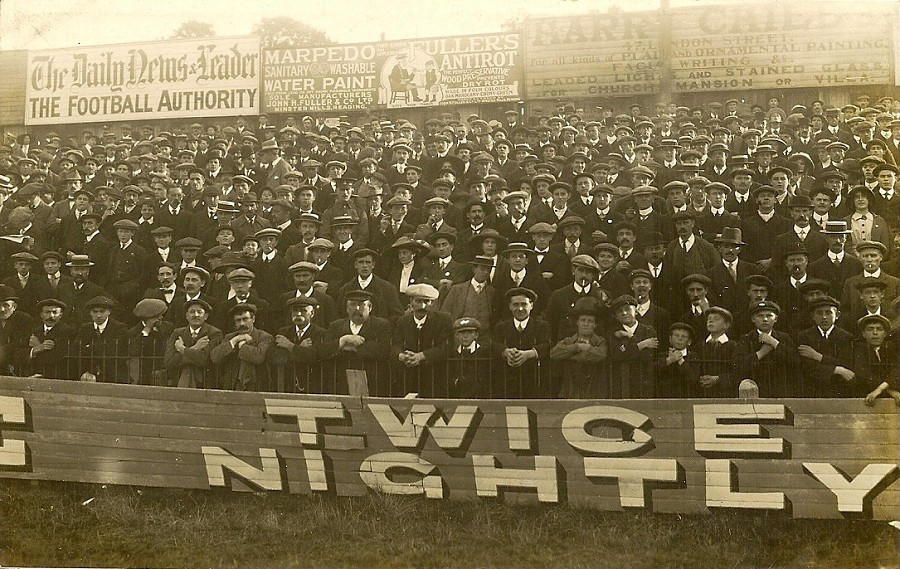
Supporters at a Reading match at Elm Park in 1913

In 1913, Reading toured Italy and beat Genoa 4–2 and AC Milan 5–0, narrowly lost 2–1 to Casale, before beating Italian champions Pro Vercelli 6–0 and the full Italy national team 2–0, prompting the leading sports newspaper Corriere della Sera to write "without doubt, Reading FC are the finest foreign team seen in Italy." Reading were invited back for another tour the following year, but there is no evidence it took place. It is possible it was cancelled due to the imminence of World War I, which claimed the lives of many Reading F.C. players, including Alan Foster, who put a hat-trick past Milan. Other players lost included amateurs Charles West and Heber Slatter. Attilio Fresia moved to Reading as a result of the tour, becoming the first Italian to play in English football.

Reading were elected to the Third Division of the Football League in 1920, as the league absorbed the first division club of the Southern Football League. The club have spent the majority of the time since then in the third and fourth tiers of the league, with occasional flirtations with the second tier.

Reading's best performance in the FA Cup came in 1926–27 when they lost to eventual winners Cardiff City at Molineux in Wolverhampton in the semi-final. The attendance at the 1–0 victory over Brentford in the fifth round set a new attendance record for Elm Park, at 33,042 people. This remains the highest attendance at a Reading home match.

Reading were promoted to the Second Division, following a Third Division South title win in 1926; the Royals were relegated back to the third tier in May 1931. The club defeated Bristol City to win the Southern Section Cup in 1938, and won the London War Cup in 1941 by defeating Brentford 3–2 in the final at Stamford Bridge.

== Post-war years (1945–1990) ==
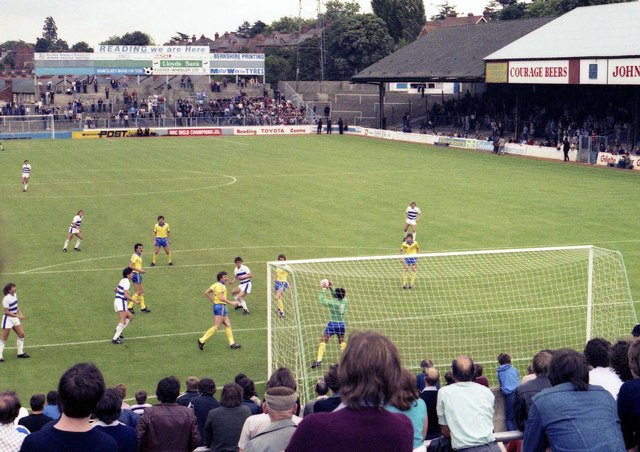
Reading playing at Elm Park in 1981

The club remained in Division Three after the war, but finished in second place in their division in 1948–49 and 1951–52. Their 10–2 win over Crystal Palace in September 1946 remains the club's scoring record.

Reading were relegated to the fourth tier of English football for the first time in the 1971–72 season. A return to the Third Division was achieved, following a third-placed finish in 1975–76, but the club suffered immediate relegation. The 1978–79 season saw Reading win the Fourth Division to win promotion back to the Third Division.

Relegation was suffered in 1982–83. Towards the end of that season, Oxford United chairman Robert Maxwell announced that he had completed a deal to merge Oxford and Reading into a single club – Thames Valley Royals. Maxwell claimed that both clubs were on the verge of bankruptcy and having a united team was required for the Thames Valley region to retain a Football League club. The proposed amalgamation was prevented by the actions of Roy Tranter, a Reading director, and Roger Smee, a former Reading player. Smee disputed the legitimacy of the controlling interest in Reading held by the three board members that supported the merger plan. Tranter launched a legal challenge to the sale of certain shares on 22 April 1983. The supporters of the plan allies resigned under pressure from the rest of the Reading board in May 1983. At an extraordinary shareholders' meeting in July, Smee took over the club to end the amalgamation plans.

Following the collapse of the merger plan, Reading were promoted back to the Third Division at the end of the 1983–84 season. This remains the last time the football club has competed at this level of English football. Reading won the league in the 1985–86 season under the management of Ian Branfoot, following a run of thirteen successive wins at the start of the season, earning promotion to the Second Division. This was the first time in fifty-five years that the club had played at this level.

The club reached their first major cup final in the 1987–88 season, when they won the Simod Cup. They beat four top flight sides en route to the final. The club's first Wembley appearance saw the club victorious over First Division Luton Town, with a 4–1 victory. Later in the season, the club were relegated back to the third tier. Branfoot left his job as manager in October 1989, having failed to get the Royals back into the Second Division. His successor, Ian Porterfield, lasted just 18 months before further failures cost him his job.

== New era (1990–1998) ==
The appointment of Mark McGhee as player-manager, shortly after the takeover by John Madejski, in June 1991 saw Reading move forward.

They were crowned champions of the new Division Two in 1994, seeing the club promoted to the second tier. When McGhee moved to Leicester City halfway through the following season, Reading were in contention for a second successive promotion. 35-year-old striker Jimmy Quinn was put in charge of the first team alongside midfielder Mick Gooding and guided Reading to runners-up in the final Division One table – only to be denied automatic promotion because of the streamlining of the Premier League, from twenty-two teams to twenty. Reading had eased past Tranmere Rovers in the play-off semi-finals and looked to have booked their place in the Premier League after building up a 2–0 lead over Bolton Wanderers by half time in the play-off final. Two late goals from Bolton forced extra time and the match ended 4–3 to Bolton. Quinn and Gooding's contracts were not renewed two years later after Reading had slid into the bottom half of Division One.

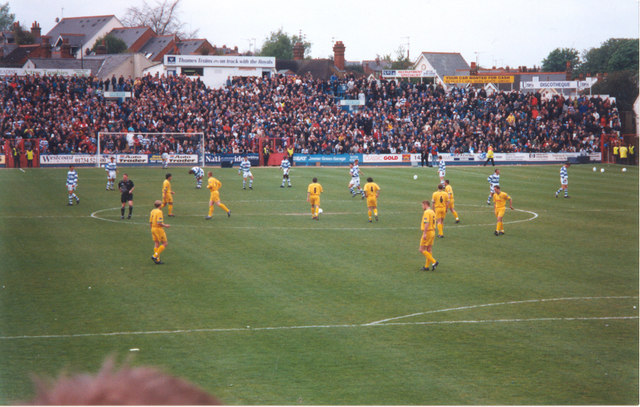
The last ever competitive match played at Elm Park between Reading and Norwich City in May 1998

Their successor, Terry Bullivant, lasted less than one season before being sacked in March 1998. The Royals finished that season bottom of Division One, slipping back into Division Two in their final season at Elm Park.

== Onwards and upwards (1998–2008) ==
Reading moved into the new 24,200 all-seater Madejski Stadium, named after chairman John Madejski, in August 1998. The club won their first match at the ground, beating Luton Town 3–0.

Tommy Burns had taken over from Terry Bullivant but lasted just 18 months before being sacked in September 1999, after a poor start to the season after the club's failure to win promotion the previous season. He was replaced by former reserve team manager Alan Pardew.

Pardew guided Reading to a third-place finish in the 2000–01 season, where the club were beaten in the play-off final by Walsall 3–2 after extra time. Later on in 2001, Reading became the first football club to register their fans as an official member of their squad, giving the "player" registered with squad number 13 as 'Reading Fans'.

Reading returned to Division One for the 2002–03 season after finishing runners-up in Division Two. A final day draw away at promotion rivals Brentford saw the club promoted. The following season they finished fourth in Division One and qualified for the play-offs, where they lost in the semi-final to eventual winners Wolverhampton Wanderers. Pardew acrimoniously moved to West Ham United the following October and being replaced by Brighton & Hove Albion manager Steve Coppell. Coppell took the Royals to seventh in his first full season with the club, missing out on a place in the play-offs by three points.

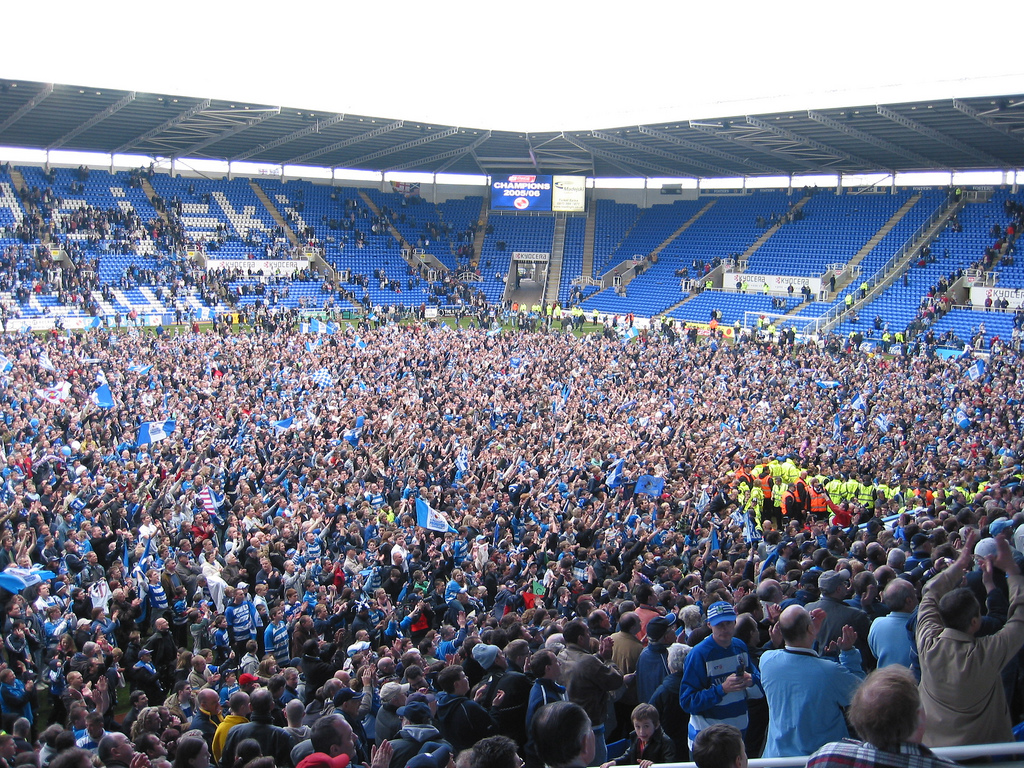
Fans celebrate their team winning the 2005–06 Football League Championship

Reading won the 2005–06 Championship with a league record 106 points, scoring 99 goals and losing only twice in league. Promotion to the Premiership was assured on 25 March 2006, with a 1–1 draw away at Leicester City. The following Saturday, the club secured the title with a 5–0 thumping of Derby County.

The 2006–07 season saw Reading make their first appearance in the top flight of English football. Striker Dave Kitson became the first player to score for Reading in the top flight, as the Royals came from 2–0 to beat Middlesbrough 3–2 in their first game in the Premiership. The Royals defied pre-season predictions of relegation to finish the season in eighth place with 55 points, missing out on UEFA Cup football by a single point; Reading turned down the chance to play in the UEFA Intertoto Cup.

In the run up to their second season in the Premier League, Reading were invited to take part in the 2007 Peace Cup in South Korea, playing Argentine giants River Plate, French champions Lyon and Japanese side Shimizu S-Pulse. The Royals failed to qualify for the final on goal difference. This second season was less successful and Reading were relegated back to the Championship following a loss of form in the second half of the season. Despite winning 4–0 away at fellow strugglers Derby County on the last day of the season, Fulham's 1–0 at Portsmouth was enough to see the club fall out of the top flight.

== Recent seasons (2008–present) ==
Reading started the 2008–09 season with a 15 match unbeaten home run until losing to Southampton. In the second half of the season, they struggled to regain the form and slipped down the table before recovering to finish fourth and qualify for the play-offs, where they lost to Burnley in the semi-final. Manager Steve Coppell resigned just hours after the game, being replaced by former academy manager Brendan Rodgers. Rodgers left the club by mutual consent on 16 December 2009, following a poor start to the season which saw the Royals in a relegation battle.

Brian McDermott was made caretaker manager the same day. He was given the job on a full-time basis, following a surprise 2–1 extra time win over Liverpool at Anfield in the FA Cup. Reading reached the quarter-finals of the competition for the first time since the 1927 cup-run, losing 4–2 to Aston Villa at the Madejski Stadium. In the following season, Reading beat West Bromwich Albion, Stevenage and Everton to reach the quarter-final of the competition for the second successive season, where they lost 1–0 to Manchester City at the City of Manchester Stadium. In the league, Reading finished fifth in the Championship to qualify for the division's play-offs. After beating Cardiff City in the semi-finals they lost 4–2 to Swansea City in the final at Wembley Stadium.

Reading started the 2011–12 season by selling captain Matt Mills and player of the season Shane Long. Early results were not favourable and the club sat second-bottom of the table after six games. However, a streak of good form in the second half of the season, combined with the signings of Adam Le Fondre, Kaspars Gorkšs and Jason Roberts, ensured promotion to the Premier League on 17 April 2012 with 1–0 home win against Nottingham Forest. In their next match on 21 April 2012, Reading secured the Championship title with a game to spare after 2–2 draw with Crystal Palace when second-placed Southampton failed to beat Middlesbrough, losing 2–1.

On 21 January 2012, it was announced that John Madejski planned to sell 51% of the club to Thames Sport Investments led by Russian-born Anton Zingarevich which was eventually completed on 29 May 2012.

On 30 October 2012, Reading created an unwanted record in the last 16 of the League Cup. At home to Arsenal, they took a 4–0 lead after 37 minutes, but Arsenal drew level at 4–4 in stoppage time to take the match into extra time, where Reading lost 7–5. Reading became the first club in the League or FA Cup to have scored five goals in a match and to have still lost. At the end of the 2012–13 season, Reading were relegated back to the Championship following a 0–0 draw with relegation rivals Queens Park Rangers.

=== Return to the Championship (2013–2023) ===
On 17 March 2015, Reading beat Bradford City 3–0 at the Madjeski Stadium in an FA Cup quarter-final replay to advance to the semi-finals of the FA Cup for the first time since 1927. The Royals were defeated by Premier League Arsenal 2–1, after extra time, to end the club's run in the competition. The club reached the quarter-finals in the next season, losing to Crystal Palace after two late goals by the Premier League outfit.

In the 2016–17, Reading reached the play-offs, following a third place league finish, under new manager Jaap Stam. The Royals narrowly beat Fulham 2–1 on aggregate in the semi-finals to advance to the final. Following a 0–0 draw at Wembley on 29 May 2017, Huddersfield Town defeated Reading 4–3 on penalties to deny the club a return to the Premier League. In 2017, Chinese investors Dai Yongge and Dai Xiu Li acquired the club.

The team languished towards the bottom of the table for most of the 2017–18 season. On 21 March 2018, Stam resigned as manager after a nine-game winless run. Two days later, on 23 March 2018, Paul Clement was appointed as Reading's new manager; the club finished the season in 20th place, avoiding relegation by three points.

Clement was sacked on 6 December 2018 after poor results left the club outside of the relegation zone only on goal difference. He was replaced by José Gomes on 22 December, who steered the club away from relegation to finish 20th again. However, after a slow start to the 2019–20 season, Gomes was dismissed after less than a year in charge with the team in the relegation zone in October 2019. Sporting director Mark Bowen was promoted to the role as his replacement a week later and led the team to finish 14th before departing the club in August 2020.

Former Chicago Fire boss Veljko Paunović was appointed manager on 29 August 2020. The team got off to an excellent start to the 2020–21 season, winning seven of their first eight league games. However, the team's form faded after injuries to several key players and they eventually narrowly missed out of the play-offs, finishing seventh.

On 17 November 2021 it was confirmed Reading would be deducted six points due to breaching the EFL's profitability and sustainability rules. Over five years, the club reported pre-tax losses of £146m, way beyond the EFL's limit of a £13m annual pre-tax loss. In 2021, the club spent 234% of its revenue on player wages.

Following a 3–2 away victory over Preston North End in February 2022, manager Veljko Paunović left by mutual consent, with Paul Ince being placed in interim charge of the team alongside academy manager Michael Gilkes. On 16 May, Ince became the team's permanent manager, with Mark Bowen returning as head of football operations.

On 1 March 2023, the team was reported to be facing another six-point deduction for breaching profitability and sustainability rules. The club accepted the penalty on 4 April 2023, enforced with immediate effect. A week later, on 11 April, Ince left after a run of eight games without a win, leaving the club in 22nd place, one point from safety. Under-21 manager Noel Hunt was placed in interim charge until the end of the season. The club was relegated from the Championship on 4 May 2023 after 10 years in the second tier. Without the six point deduction, Reading would have finished on 50 points, escaping relegation.

=== League One struggles (2023–) ===
In June 2023, Reading were charged by the EFL with failing to pay their players on time and in full, in October and November 2022, and April 2023, and with non-payment of taxes – charges that meant Reading might start their 2023–24 League One season with a points deduction. Following the EFL's action, Reading fans groups united to launch a campaign, Sell Before We Dai, urging owner Dai Yongge to sell the club, calling his stewardship "an unmitigated disaster" and citing the club's "excruciating financial losses". On 27 June, Reading were served a winding-up petition by HMRC over the unpaid tax bills, with a hearing set for 9 August (on 12 July, football finance expert Kieran Maguire described the club's ownership as "a car crash"). On 28 July, the club was placed under another transfer embargo because of the unpaid taxes. On 2 August, Dai Yongge was reported to be seeking new investors to bring financial stability to the club.

On 27 February 2024, Reading received their second points deduction of the season, being docked two more points by the EFL after failing to make HMRC payments within an 80-day limit. The deduction left the club three points above the relegation places. At the end of April 2024, the club finished the League One season in 17th position. The ongoing financial difficulties caused the women's team to withdraw from the Women's Championship on 30 June. An attempted takeover by former Wycombe Wanderers owner Rob Couhig collapsed in September 2024, a bid by former Reading chairman Roger Smee ended in December 2024, and negotiations over another (unnamed) takeover bid expired in February 2025.

Meanwhile, on 26 June 2023, Reading announced the provisional appointment of Rubén Sellés as their new manager, confirmed on 14 July, after his visa application was successful.

On 16 August 2023, after one win and two defeats in their opening three league fixtures, Reading had a point deducted (their third deduction in three consecutive seasons), and a further three-point deduction suspended, for its failures to pay players fully and on time during the 2022–23 season. Dai Yongge was ordered to pay 125% of the club's forecast monthly wages into a designated account. Failure to comply, or not paying wages on time up to 30 June 2024, would activate the suspended penalty; the three-point deduction was applied on 13 September, and Dai Yongge faced a misconduct charge.

On 29 September 2023, Dai Yongge said he was open to "credible offers of interest" to buy the club after another transfer embargo was imposed in respect to an outstanding tax bill. A 3–2 home defeat by Portsmouth on 28 October 2023 dropped the club to the bottom of League One on six points, eight from safety; the match was preceded by a fans protest against Dai Yongge's ownership.

On 19 December 2023, Dai Yongge was fined £20,000 for Reading's wages failures; the EFL had recommended a 12-month ban from all football activities, but an independent disciplinary commission opted not to enforce it. A further £50,000 fine was suspended until 12 January 2024, but will be triggered if Dai Yongge again fails to make the required full wage deposits.

On 13 January 2024, Reading's match against Port Vale was abandoned after home fans invaded the pitch to protest about Yongge's ownership of the club. After imposing a £50,000 fine for failing to meet wages deadlines, the EFL said Dai Yongge must "fund the club adequately" or "make immediate arrangements to sell". Reading CEO Dayong Pang said that, after two unsuccessful offers, Dai Yongge was "100% willing to sell the club" and the selling process was "ongoing"; On 26 January 2024, former CEO Nigel Howe (asked by Dai Yongge to oversee the club's sale) said eight parties were interested in buying Reading but any sale would take at least two months to complete.

On 27 February 2024, Reading received their second points deduction of the season, being docked two more points by the EFL after failing to make HMRC payments within an 80-day limit. The deduction left the club three points above the relegation places. In total, under Dai Yongge's ownership, the club has had 18 points deducted. In March 2024, Dai Yongge was "open to the sale" of the club's Bearwood Park training facility to secure funding while new owners were sought, a move criticised by supporters groups for the confusing message it sent to potential investors; the club faces a cash shortfall of about £1m for March. On 14 March, Reading announced they were holding talks with Wycombe Wanderers over the sale of Bearwood Park, but Wycombe put the talks "on hold" after learning that "planning limitations allowed only Reading to use the grounds".

On 21 March 2024, Nigel Howe said there have been "approaches from around the world" to buy Reading. Four days later, Reading were reported to be in "exclusive negotiations" with a buyer to agree final terms for Dai's shareholding, the stadium and the training ground, which could take up to two months.

At the end of April 2024, the club finished the League One season in 17th position. The ongoing financial difficulties caused the women's team to withdraw from the Women's Championship on 30 June.

An attempted takeover by former Wycombe Wanderers owner Rob Couhig collapsed in September 2024, a bid by former Reading chairman Roger Smee ended in December 2024, and negotiations over another (unnamed) takeover bid expired in February 2025. Also in February 2025, local MP Yuan Yang backed a supporters' group call for an inquiry into the club's governance since May 2012.

In March 2025, Yongge was given until 4 April 2025 to sell the club after the EFL disqualified him under its Owners' and Directors' Test. Also in March 2025, 12 months late, Reading finally submitted financial accounts for the 2022-23 relegation campaign, revealing a loss of over £20m. The late filing of accounts resulted in an EFL transfer embargo, which could be reinstated if Reading failed to publish their 2023-24 accounts by 31 March.

=== New ownership (2025–) ===
On 3 May 2025, prior to the final match of the 2024-25 season, a 4-2 home defeat to Barnsley, Reading announced that a sale in principle of the club, stadium, and training ground to Rob Couhig's Redwood Holdings Limited had been agreed. On 14 May 2025, Reading and the EFL announced that Redwood Holdings had completed their takeover of the club ending Dai Yongge's ownership of the club.

On 26 June 2025, the fixtures were announced with Reading starting their third consecutive season in EFL League One with a trip to Sincil Bank to face Lincoln City and would end the season by hosting Blackpool at the Select Car Leasing Stadium.
