= Thames Valley Royals proposal =

Unsuccessful proposal to merge football teams

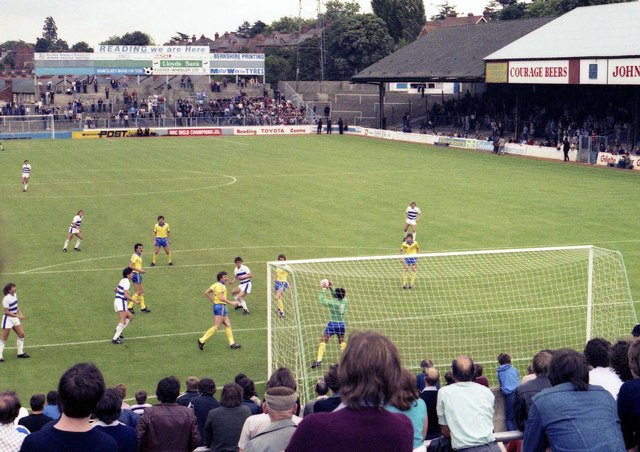
A Football League Group Cup match between Reading (blue and white) and Oxford United (yellow and blue) at Reading's Elm Park in August 1981. The "Thames Valley Royals" proposal of 1983 was to merge the two clubs.

The Thames Valley Royals proposal was a controversial and ultimately unsuccessful 1983 proposal to merge the Oxford United and Reading football clubs.

Shortly before the end of the 1982–83 Football League season, Robert Maxwell, the then-owner and chairman of Oxford United Football Club, announced that he had made a deal with the owners of nearby Reading to amalgamate the two teams to create a new club he proposed to name "Thames Valley Royals". This appellation combined a loose term for the geographical region, "Thames Valley", with the Reading team's nickname, "the Royals". With each team having financial problems, Maxwell claimed that both were on the verge of going out of business and that uniting them was necessary for the region to retain a Football League club.

Maxwell envisioned the Thames Valley Royals' future home as an unspecified location somewhere between Oxford and Reading where a new stadium would be built, perhaps in Didcot; home matches would alternate between Oxford and Reading in the meantime. Both sets of supporters promptly embarked on mass demonstrations against the merger, including protest marches and a 2,000-man sit-in on the pitch at Oxford before a match on 23 April. Maxwell pressed on with his plan regardless, insisting that "nothing short of the end of the Earth" would prevent its fruition.

The proposed amalgamation was stopped by the actions of one of Reading's board directors, Roy Tranter, and Roger Smee, a businessman and former Reading player. Smee disputed the legitimacy of the controlling interest in Reading held by the faction of three Reading board members that backed the merger plan, including the chairman Frank Waller, and Tranter launched a legal challenge to the sale of certain shares on 22 April 1983. Waller and his boardroom allies resigned under pressure from the rest of the Reading board on 12 May 1983, and at an extraordinary shareholders' meeting in July, Smee took over the club, ending the amalgamation plans.

== Context ==
During the 1982–83 Football League season, both Oxford United and Reading competed in the Football League Third Division, then the third tier of English football—equivalent to today's League One. Managed by Jim Smith, Oxford challenged for promotion throughout the season, while Maurice Evans' Reading team languished near the relegation zone for much of the year, despite possessing one of the division's top-scoring forwards in Kerry Dixon. The media mogul and former MP Robert Maxwell owned and chaired Oxford, having prevented the club's bankruptcy by buying it in 1982. One of the world's oldest football teams (established in 1871), Reading were a public limited company, chaired by Frank Waller, a prominent local businessman; while owning Oxford, Maxwell also held 19% of Reading's shares. The two clubs share a local rivalry. At the time, both were in financial difficulties, particularly Reading. Maxwell sought to build a new stadium for Oxford United; he had negotiated with the council over potential locations since the time of his takeover, favouring a site in the northern suburb of Marston, but had yet to win council permission to buy the land.

== Proposal ==
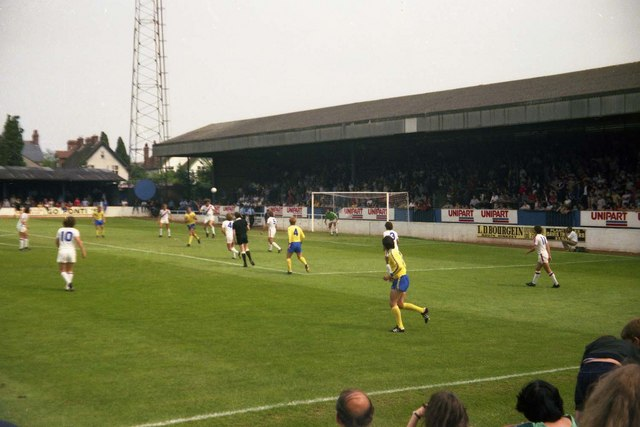
Oxford United (yellow and blue) playing a home match at the Manor Ground in 1980

Thames Valley Royals proposal
Proposed colours

On 16 April 1983, about a month before the end of the 1982–83 season, Maxwell told the BBC that he was close to acquiring a controlling interest in Reading, and that he was intent on merging that club with Oxford. The merged club would be called Thames Valley Royals, a combination of "Thames Valley", a loose term for the geographical area, and the nickname of Reading Football Club, "the Royals"; the proposed colours were amber and gold hooped shirts - a mix of Reading's hoops and Oxford's gold - and white shorts, while the club's home games would alternate between Oxford and Reading. "If we in Thames Valley are to retain a League club we've got to unite Reading and Oxford," he explained. "Everything in the world that cannot pay its way must go the way of merger to combine into stronger units."

Maxwell made this announcement on a Saturday when most Football League clubs, including Oxford and Reading, were playing League fixtures. Oxford were playing away at Doncaster Rovers. Jim Smith learned of the announcement shortly before kick-off at Doncaster's Belle Vue ground from John Ley, a journalist with the Oxford Mail, who had heard the news from another newsman by telephone. Smith immediately called Maxwell to ask whether or not he would be retained to manage Thames Valley Royals, and was told that he would be.

Maxwell issued a statement announcing that Oxford United were poised to acquire Reading by purchasing all of that club's issued share capital, comprising 73,000 shares, at £3 per share (a total cost of £219,000), and that Waller and a group of Reading board directors, holding a majority of the shares in Reading F.C., had "irrevocably accepted" this offer. The two clubs would continue separately for the last few weeks of the 1982–83 campaign, and Thames Valley Royals would begin play at the start of the 1983–84 League season. Maxwell claimed to have support in principle for this from the Football League. He said that the amalgamated team would ultimately be based at a new stadium to be built somewhere between Oxford and Reading, and that in the meantime home games would alternate between the two old grounds, Elm Park in Reading and the Manor Ground in Oxford, both of which would eventually be sold. The general public learned of the proposed merger in the late afternoon on 16 April, when it was announced by David Coleman on the television show Grandstand following the report of the day's football results.

== Reactions ==
Mr Maxwell obviously believes that if you add 6,000 United fans to 6,000 Reading fans you'll get 12,000 supporters for the new club. You won't.

— Ron Atkinson, a former Oxford United captain

Many supporters from both teams expressed opposition to the merger proposal. While many Oxford supporters acknowledged that Maxwell had been instrumental in saving the club the previous year, most perceived merging with another club as tantamount to killing both Oxford United and professional football in the city. A spokesman for the Oxford United Supporters Club called the idea "crazy and unworkable". Many Reading fans strongly opposed the merger; Mike Habbits, chairman of the Reading Supporters Club, said "Our fans can't stand Oxford fans and I can't see them travelling to Oxford to watch the new team". Supporters and pressmen alike ridiculed the "Thames Valley Royals" name, which the sports historian John Bale later described as "mid-Atlantic"; observers at the time variously perceived it as sounding more like an American football, ice hockey or speedway team than a football club. Some Oxford fans supported Maxwell's proposal, saying that with a new stadium and the pooled financial resources of Oxford and Reading, an amalgamated team might be successful, but these were a minority. One angry fan wrote to the Oxford Mail that "I will not follow Thames Valley Royals or whatever their name is if they played at the end of my street".

Players at both clubs received the news with apprehension. As Ley put it, "When you merge two clubs into one, you cannot have a squad of 45." The Oxford team learned of the impending merger and the new name from Smith in the dressing room at Belle Vue just before the match against Doncaster on 16 April. Mark Jones, one of the Oxford midfielders, recalled that the room "went totally quiet", and that his first thought was that it might be hard for him to keep his place in the first team with Reading's players also on the books. According to Jones, Smith attempted to assuage the Oxford players' fears by telling them that "we're only doing it so we can buy Kerry Dixon. All your places are safe". Alan Judge, the Reading goalkeeper, reported his team reacting in a similar way—indeed, he described the Reading players as even more worried as Oxford had far outperformed them in the League that season. Ley, who accompanied the Oxford team on the bus ride home after the game, recalled that the players were almost silent, their victory over Doncaster overshadowed by "a feeling of incredulity, confusion, worry and fear".

Oxford United's board of directors unanimously supported Maxwell's proposed amalgamation at a board meeting held on 20 April 1983. Their only reservation was regarding the name; they preferred "Thames Valley United". The chairman of the Football League, Jack Dunnett, described Maxwell's proposal as "a bold and imaginative move which I'll be watching with interest". Meanwhile, Maxwell re-entered talks with Oxford City Council over local stadium sites, repeating his preference for the Marston location. The council again refused. The mayor of Didcot, a small town about halfway between Oxford and Reading, suggested that Thames Valley Royals could build a ground there, on a site that had already been picked out for non-League amateurs Didcot Town. Wallingford, a similar proposition just east of Didcot, was also proposed. Some reports suggested that residents of Didcot and Wallingford were hesitant to host the new club, citing concerns including football hooliganism.

== Controversy ==
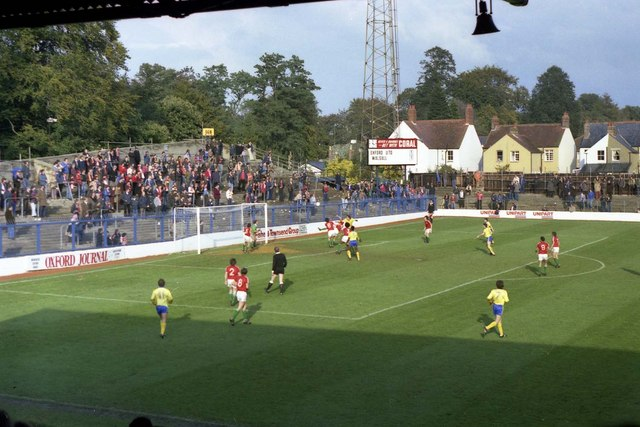
An Oxford United match at the Manor Ground in 1980

Oxford and Reading supporters embarked on a series of demonstrations against Maxwell's proposed merger. The Reading Evening Post set up a campaign called "Save Our Soccer", while Oxford fans launched a similar initiative called "Save Oxford Soccer". Before Oxford's match against Wigan Athletic at the Manor Ground on 23 April 1983, about 2,000 fans conducted a sit-in in the centre of the pitch, delaying the start of the game by half an hour. Maxwell, in the directors' box, was jeered by supporters, some of whom spat at him, and was confronted by a number of banners around the stadium reading "Judas". After the match (which Oxford won 2–0), Maxwell called the demonstration a "bloody disgrace". He reaffirmed his commitment to the Thames Valley Royals project a few days later through a phone-in on BBC Radio Oxford. "If they want to become supporters of someone else, they're entirely welcome," he said. "If the deal does not go through, both Reading and Oxford will be dead before the beginning of next season. Nothing short of the end of the Earth will prevent this from going through." Steve Daniels, an Oxford fan opposed to a merger, called in and claimed that Maxwell's amalgamation proposal was a ploy intended to alter the council's line regarding a new stadium in Oxford.

Meanwhile, efforts to stop the merger were stepped up at Reading by Roger Smee, a former Reading player, born and raised in the town, who had become a millionaire in the construction industry. Smee, who strongly opposed the merger plan, had read the club's accounts the previous year, and so was aware of how the team's stock was allocated. He knew that Waller and his boardroom allies, Leslie Davies and John Briggs, had not held a controlling interest in the club in 1982 and that a large number of Reading shares had then been noted as unissued. His interest was therefore piqued when the Thames Valley Royals deal was declared "irrevocable" on the basis that Waller's faction controlled the majority of the shares in Reading. "A year ago they didn't have a majority," Smee later said, "so how on earth have they issued these shares to themselves while Reading was a public company? That would be against the law." Smee contacted Roy Tranter, a director at Reading who opposed the merger, and Tranter's legal team filed a complaint with the High Court objecting to the sale of the unissued shares.

On 22 April 1983, just as Waller and Maxwell were about to officially announce the merger, Tranter's solicitors handed Waller a High Court injunction temporarily blocking sale of the disputed stock. Three days later, the High Court imposed a further injunction preventing any dealing in Reading shares until a further hearing on 3 May. Maxwell described the legal challenge as a "side show"; he made a fresh bid to all of Reading's shareholders. On 1 May, the Oxford chairman told the press that he and his supporters at Reading controlled 40% of the shares. Meanwhile, Oxford City Council offered Oxford United a new "£6 million sports complex" in the western suburb of Botley. Maxwell said that he was still pursuing the merger with Reading, but would look into the Botley proposal.

Reading supporters marched from the town centre to Elm Park in protest against the merger before the team's match against Millwall on 30 April. Two days later, Oxford and Reading met at the Manor Ground in what the Glasgow Herald commented might be "the last Thames Valley derby". Oxford fans held another protest march before the game, which Reading won 2–1. At the High Court on 3 May, Mr Justice Harman sided with Tranter and Smee, and handed down a new injunction forbidding trading in Reading stock until 13 June 1983. Following a Reading board meeting on 12 May, Waller, Davies and Briggs resigned their positions, and returned the disputed unissued shares to the club. The Reading Evening Post reported the news with the headline: "We've won! Merger off". The next day, Reading played Wrexham at home on the last day of the League season, needing to win to have any chance of avoiding relegation to the Fourth Division; they won 1–0, but still went down because of results elsewhere. The club held an extraordinary meeting of shareholders in July 1983, at which a vote was taken to decide between Maxwell's takeover bid and a rival offer from Smee, supported by Tranter. The latter proposition narrowly won, and Smee took over as chairman of Reading, putting an end to the planned merger.

== Aftermath ==
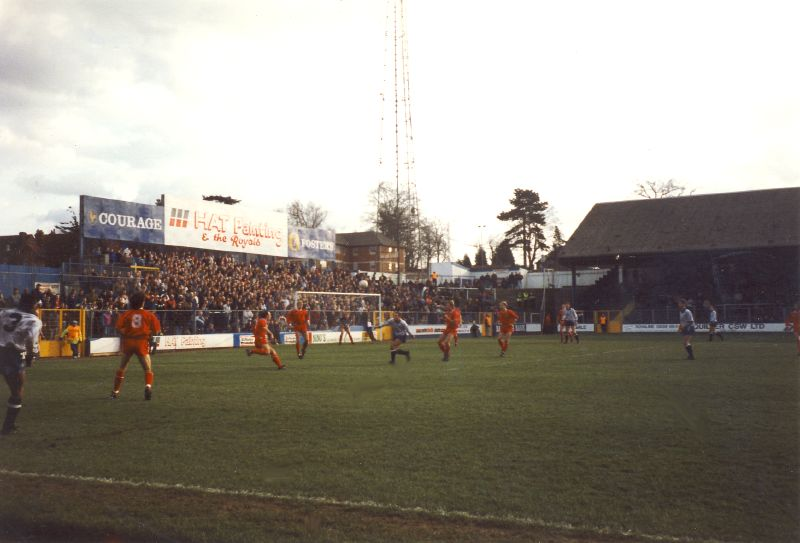
A Reading match at Elm Park in 1992

Maxwell ceased efforts to merge the clubs but retained his 19% stake in Reading. Under Smee's chairmanship, the team won promotion back from the Fourth Division at the end of the 1983–84 season, and won the Third Division title two years later, taking it into the Second Division. Smee remained at the helm until 1990, when amid a financial crisis at the club he sold it to John Madejski. During Maxwell's ownership, Oxford United achieved financial stability and gained promotion in the 1983–84 and 1984–85 seasons. The team played in the First Division, then the top level of English football, for the first time during 1985–86, and won its first major trophy, the League Cup, in April 1986. Despite Maxwell's reservations about the Manor Ground, the club remained there throughout this time.

Maxwell stepped down as Oxford's chairman in 1987 and later took control of Derby County; still owning Oxford as well, he installed his son Kevin as chairman there. In late 1987 he attempted to buy Watford from Elton John, prompting the Football League to institute new regulations preventing the major shareholder of any member club from owning more than 2% of another League team. While Maxwell was able to keep his stakes in Derby, Oxford and Reading under a grandfather clause, the new rules prevented him from adding Watford to his football empire. He grudgingly accepted this. He retained his football club shares until his mysterious death in November 1991, when he apparently fell off his yacht near the Canary Islands.

== Notes and references ==
=== Online sources ===
- Bunce, Alan (1 May 2013). "History month: Fans march against Reading FC merger with Oxford United". Reading: Surrey & Berkshire Media.
- Hassan, Nabil (13 June 2013). "Robert Maxwell's phantom club, the Thames Valley Royals". London: BBC.
- Roach, Stuart (27 March 2006). "Reading's rags to riches". London: BBC.
- "One man and a mad dream – the strange story of Robert Maxwell and the Thames Valley Royals". Reading: Supporters' Trust At Reading. Archived from the original on 19 April 2014.

=== Journal and newspaper articles ===
- Pennington, Piers (16 March 2001). "Three's a crowd". When Saturday Comes. London.
- "Merger blocked by High Court". Glasgow Herald. Glasgow. 26 April 1983. p. 23.
- "New plan to help Oxford". Glasgow Herald. Glasgow. 2 May 1983. p. 15.
- "We've Won! Merger Off. Page one opinion". Reading Evening Post. Reading. 13 May 1983. p. 1.
- "A tale of an artful Roger". New Straits Times. Kuala Lumpur. 21 November 1985. p. 24.
- "Tranter was the saviour of Reading FC". Reading Post. Reading. 13 January 2009.

=== Bibliography ===
- Bale, John (1993). Sport, Space and the City. London: Routledge. ISBN 0-415-08098-3.
- Brodetsky, Martin (2009). Oxford United: The Complete Record. Derby: Breedon Books. ISBN 978-1-85983-715-3.
- Dhaliwal, Spinder (2008). Making a Fortune: Learning from the Asian Phenomenon. Hoboken, New Jersey: John Wiley & Sons. ISBN 978-1-90646-516-2.
- Downs, David; Edwards, Leigh (July 1998). The Definitive Reading F.C.: A Statistical History to 1998. Nottingham: Soccerdata. ISBN 9781899468119.
- Thompson, Peter; Delano, Anthony (February 1988). Maxwell: A Portrait of Power. London: Bantam Press. ISBN 978-0593014998.
