= Elm Park (stadium) =

Former football stadium in Reading, Berkshire, England

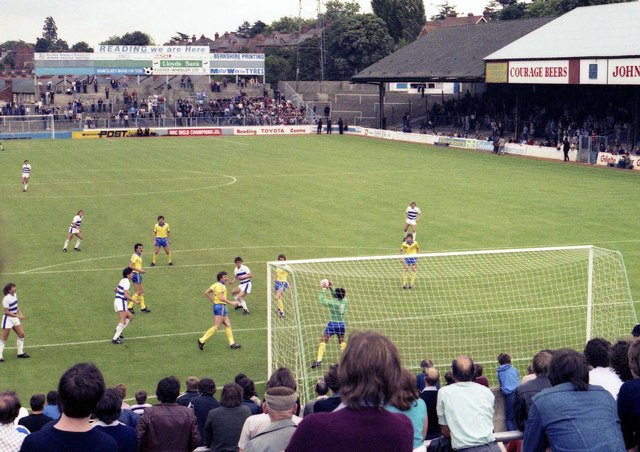
- Elm Park in 1981
- Interactive map of Elm Park
- Location: Reading, Berkshire, England
- Coordinates: 51.4534°N 1.0026°W
- Owner: Reading Football Club
- Operator: Reading Football Club
- Capacity: ~33,000 (historically); 14,800 (final)
- Surface: Grass
- Record attendance: 33,042
- Public transit: Reading West (1.1 km (0.7 mi))

Construction
- Opened: 1896
- Renovated: Norfolk Road: 1926, 1986; Town End: 1931; South Bank: 1936, 1949, 1956; Tilehurst End: 1957; Floodlights: 1954, 1969
- Closed: 1998
- Demolished: 1998

Elm Park was a football stadium in the West Reading district of Reading, Berkshire, England. The stadium was the home of Reading Football Club from 1896 to 1998, when the club moved to the new Madejski Stadium.

== History ==
=== Early years ===
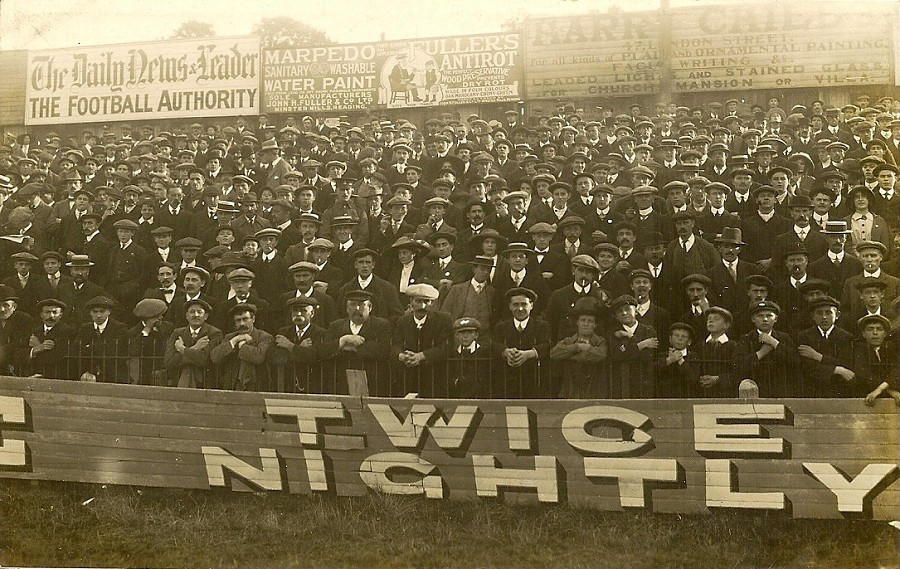
Supporters at a Reading match at Elm Park in 1913

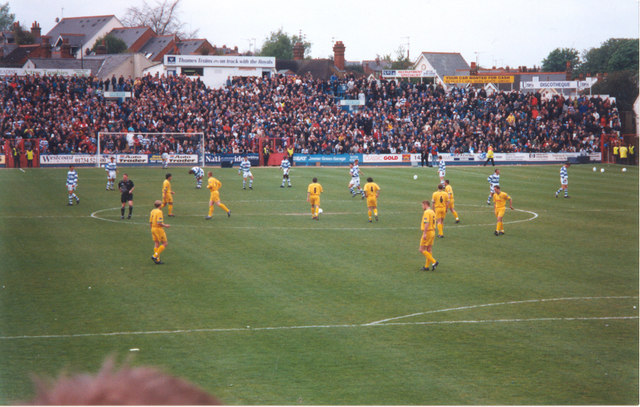
The last competitive match played at Elm Park between Reading and Norwich City in May 1998

In 1889, Reading were unable to continue playing at Coley Park as W.B. Monck (the local squire) no longer allowed football due to "rowdyism [by] the rougher elements". With club membership exceeding 300 by the time the club went professional in 1895, Reading required a proper ground. A meeting the following year determined that funding would be difficult. £20 was donated by J.C. Fidler, on the proviso that "no liquors were to be sold" on site. The rest of the cost was financed through donations by wealthy supporters, as well as one large individual donation. A former gravel pit in West Reading was identified as the site and the area was leased from Councillor Jesse.

The first game at Elm Park was held on 5 September 1896 between Reading and the A. Roston Bourke XI, named after honorary secretary of the Referees' Association Arthur Roston Bourke. The visitors were a scratch team from Holloway College and thus not registered with the Football Association. The match was abandoned due to torrential weather when Reading were leading 7–1. £44 was taken on the gate, with an attendance of approximately 2,500. After the match, Reading were fined £5 and suspended for playing against an unregistered team.

In 1908, the club's annual general meeting proposed moving to a new ground near Reading railway station. A board meeting the following year decided that the move would not be possible, as "there was no chance of a move to the ground near to the GWR railway stations due to the actions of the Great Western Railway".

=== Redevelopment ===
The ground was redeveloped following the club's promotion to the Second Division in 1926. A new grandstand, holding around 4,000 people, was opened on 13 November 1926 and remained until the ground's demolition. The Town End terrace was improved in 1931 as a result of Supporters' Club's 'one shilling' scheme, whilst the central section of the South Bank was roofed in 1936. A public address system was installed in 1946 and in the same year a 'twenty thousand shilling fund' was sent up to completely cover the South Bank. This was completed in two stages (1949 and 1956).

In 1949, club chairman William Lee commissioned a firm of architects to redesign the ground. The club built new turnstiles, access routes, dressing rooms, office space and bathing facilities. Plans to cover the Town End and building a new 'double-decker' stand over the South Bank never progressed due to the post-World War II regulations restricting the club's ability to obtain building materials. The club installed floodlights which were first used on 6 October 1954 against Racing Club de Paris in a friendly match, with the second-half broadcast live on the BBC in front of a crowd of 13,000.

The Tilehurst End was rebuilt in 1957: the railway sleepers had become rotten and weed-infested and were replaced with four-inch high concrete steps. The capacity of the ground was roughly 30,000 at this stage.

=== Decay ===
The addition of a few refreshment stands, the opening of a club shop and the installation of folding seats to replace the bench seating in the Norfolk Road grandstand were among the limited improvements to the ground until its closure. The appointment of new manager Jack Mansell in 1969 saw improved floodlights added. Talk of a two-tiered south stand re-emerged as crowds briefly topped 15,000, but relegation to Division Four, where the club remained for five years, prevented this from happening.

The increase of football hooliganism in the 1970s led to the club erecting fencing at their end of the South Bank, completely separating each of the four stands for the first time. Previously, supporters had been able to walk from one end of the ground to the other via the South Bank. It wasn't until the 1980s when the club officially designated the Town End to away supporters.

In the early 1980s, ageing club chairman Frank Waller was negotiating a merger with Oxford United owner Robert Maxwell, which reduced any desire for the club's board to improve facilities at Elm Park. The initial proposal was for a new stadium to be built in Didcot. The merger would have almost certainly led to the closure of Elm Park, with the ground being sold for re-development. The teams' merger and closure of the stadium was subsequently averted and the following season saw Reading's promotion back to Division Three under the guidance of Ian Branfoot.

=== Final years ===
Following the collapse of merger, new chairman Roger Smee had ambitions to move the club to a new ground. The Reading Chronicle reported his desire for a "10,000 all-seater stadium in the Smallmead area which would be linked to commercial use and incorporate a leisure complex". At the time, no Football League club had move grounds for nearly thirty years and it wouldn't be until Scunthorpe's relocation to Glanford Park in 1988 that a new ground was built. In 1984, the proposal for the club's move to the Smallmead area of Reading was noted in the local government's Kennet Valley Plan.

For six years between 1979 and 1985 there was no league match that attracted a gate higher than 10,000 at Elm Park, in a downward trend echoed by the rest of English football. The Popplewell Report into the Bradford City stadium fire had implications for Elm Park, especially the 1926-built wooden grandstand. Smoking was banned in seated areas, the gangways were widened and seats were deemed unusable due to being too far from the fire exits. As these seats were at the back of stand, they were replaced with twelve executive boxes. In total, around a thousand seats were lost and Elm Park's capacity was initially reduced to 8,000 ahead of the 1985–86 season.

The first match of the season attracted less than 4,000 spectators, however Reading were forced to lock people out of their game against Bolton Wanderers as the club embarked on a thirteen-match winning run from the start of the league season. By the time Reading played Wolverhampton Wanderers in late-October, efforts had been made to increase the usable capacity of the ground. Officially 13,000 watched the game which ended the club's winning start to the season, although it was later reported by the then-managing director the crowd was actually 17,500.

That season saw the club promoted back to the Second Division for the first time since 1931. Minor changes to the ground were required: a new fire exit added for egress onto Norfolk Road, the Tilehurst Road turnstiles were demolished and replaced with a new block towards the South Bank and the Royals Rendezvous bar was constructed behind the South Bank. Reading introduced an identity card scheme ahead of the government's proposed legislation on the topic, which would've required all supporters to be registered with a Football League club. It was required for entry to the South Bank, and fences were introduced at the front of the stands to prevent home and away supporters from entering the field of play. The club returned to the third tier for the 1988–89 season.

=== Moving to the Madejski Stadium ===
The Taylor Report regarding the 1989 Hillsborough disaster recommended all-seater stadia become compulsory in the top two divisions of English football, something which was to be introduced for the 1994–95 season. The report also led to a provision being dropped in the Football Spectators Act 1989 that would have required supporters to have an identity cards and fences were no longer insisted on by footballing authorities. Initially clubs in the lower two divisions of the Football League would have been required to have all-seater stadia by 1999, but this was later scrapped.

In 1992, the club believed they had seven years before they had to be playing at an all-seater stadium and the Footballing Licencing Authority had concerns about the safety of the Town End. Whilst some safety work was carried out at that end of the ground, the club put its efforts into building a new stadium. Following Reading's promotion back to the second tier in 1994, they became required to have an all-seated ground within three seasons. Converting Elm Park to an all-seater stadium would have been impractical, with a fully seated Elm Park having an estimated capacity of around 9,000. The club would have constraints related to parking and providing large enough offices for the club's expanding backroom staff.

Reading lost the 1995 First Division play-off final, with the victors being promoted to the Premiership. It was unclear whether Elm Park would have been allowed to host Premiership matches, with locations in London being mooted. The club's progression during this period saw the club's plan for the new ground increase from 15,000 seats in 1992 to 25,000 seats once the plans were publicly revealed in August 1995, around three times the capacity of a fully-seated Elm Park. The plans for Elm Park were to flatten the ground and build 128 dwellings on the site and retaining the Royals Rendezvous bar.

A location in Smallmead, to the south of the town, was identified as the site for a new stadium. The former council landfill site was bought for £1, with further conditions that the development of the stadium would include part-funding of the A33 relief road. Expansion of the club's home would also allow for alternative commercial ventures (particularly leisure facilities) and shared use with other teams (such as rugby union clubs Richmond and London Irish).

The last competitive match at Elm Park took place on 3 May 1998 against Norwich City, with Reading losing 1–0, having already been relegated to Division Two, to a 57th-minute goal by a young Craig Bellamy. The ground was maintained over the summer to be used in the event the new Madejski Stadium wasn't finished in time for the new season. Reading played Sheffield Wednesday in a pre-season friendly at the ground prior to the start of the following season, winning 3–0 in front of a 7,500 crowd. Two testimonials, for Fred Neate and Michael Gilkes, and an over-35s tournament, featuring a Supporters' Club team, followed before the contents of the ground were auctioned off.

Reading began the 1998–99 season at the Madejski Stadium, named after chairman John Madejski, who had taken over the club in 1991 and delivered the new stadium. Demolition of Elm Park began in October 1998.

== Structure and facilities ==
Plan of Elm Park

Elm Park featured four stands:

- North ("Norfolk Road")
- South ("Tilehurst Terrace" or "South Bank")
- West ("Tilehurst End")
- East ("Reading End" or "Town End")

The north (with a capacity of 4,000 seated) and south (6,000 standing) stands were covered; the west and east stands were uncovered terraces. The east stand was reserved for away supporters, as was a small section of the north stand.

In 1920, the seats in the north stand were upholstered. At the same time, the railings on the south stand were moved forward 3 yards (2.7 m) to allow a further 2,500 spectators in the ground.

The stadium's capacity was traditionally given as approximately 33,000, though changes implemented in the wake of the Taylor report meant that the capacity upon the ground's closure was approximately 14,800.

== Records ==
The ground's record attendance was in 1927, when 33,042 spectators watched Reading beat Brentford 1–0. The lowest attendance was on 26 October 1938 when 801 people watched Reading play Watford in the Division 3 cup.

Reading's greatest ticket revenue was on 27 January 1996, when the club hosted Manchester United in the fourth round of the 1995–96 FA Cup. Revenue from ticket sales totalled £110,741.

=== Highest attendance ===
With the capacity previously far greater than the current capacity of the Madejski Stadium, Elm Park has been the venue of Reading's highest attendances to date. Reading's highest attendances at home have been:

Date	Opponent	Competition	Attendance
19 February 1927	Brentford	1926–27 FA Cup	33,042
16 February 1935	Arsenal	1934–35 FA Cup	30,621
26 January 1929	The Wednesday	1928–29 FA Cup	29,248
24 September 1949	Notts County	Division 3 South	29,029
8 January 1927	Manchester United	1926–27 FA Cup	28,918
12 January 1952	Swansea Town	1951–52 FA Cup	28,129
8 March 1952	Plymouth Argyle	Division 3 South	28,055
28 January 1928	Leicester City	1927–28 FA Cup	27,243

== Transport ==
Bus services between Reading town centre and Elm Park were operated by Reading Buses. Reading West railway station was the closest railway station to the stadium, though major services only stop at Reading railway station.

== Sources ==
- "Reading v Blackpool, 17 August 1985", 11vs11.com, 2024a
- "Reading v Wolverhampton Wanderers, 23 October 1985", 11vs11.com, 2024b
- "The Home Grounds of Reading FC", 1871.net, 2003
- Davies, Mal; Carosi, Julian (2006), 100 Years, Coventry, Warwickshire: Referees Association, archived from the original on 24 July 2011
- Digby, Bob (2001), It's a World Thing, Oxford, Oxfordshire: Oxford University Press, ISBN 0199134286
- "Thatcher won't back down on soccer ID cards", The Guardian, London, 7 July 1988
- Hob Nob Anyone? (1998), Away Fans' Guide, Reading, Berkshire: Hob Nob Anyone?
- Josey, Zac; Titford, Roger (1999), Rusting Tin & Shiny Plastic, Inkpen, Berkshire: Further Thought Publishing, ISBN 0951877119
- Loader, Graham (1998), READING 0 Norwich City 1, Hob Nob Anyone?
- Reading Football Club (13 October 2009), The History of Reading Football Club, Reading Football Club, archived from the original on 4 February 2010
- Royals Record (2011a), Reading's Grounds, Royals Record, archived from the original on 16 May 2019
- Royals Record (2011b), Record Attendances, Royals Record, archived from the original on 16 May 2019
- van Eijden, Han (2011), Elm Park Reading, Old Football Grounds, archived from the original on 30 June 2009
- Yeo, Stephen (1976), Religion and Voluntary Organisations in Crisis, Abingdon, Oxfordshire: Taylor and Francis, ISBN 0856640174
