= Hob Nob Anyone? =

Reading F.C. fan website

- Website type: Internet forum
- Available in: English
- Owner: Graham Loader
- Creator: Graham Loader
- Website: www.royals.org
- Commercial: No
- Registration: Optional
- Launched: August 1994
- Current status: Active

Hob Nob Anyone? is an unofficial fanzine site for fans of Reading F.C. the association football club in Reading, England. The name is a reference to the town's association with biscuit making: for many years, the town of Reading was home to the Huntley & Palmers biscuit factory.

== History ==
The site was first launched in November 1994, and is believed to be the oldest unofficial football club website on the Internet. The website was initially used by the club for official news and ticket information, and later was used for organizing fan based events such as "Pants Day", which was inspired by events at Reading Football Club as a safe alternative to other demonstrations, and was held during the 2-2 home draw against Wrexham F.C. in December 1999.

The website was hosted at the University of East Anglia in 1994. Early in 1999, the site got its domain names (royals.cx and royals.org), and moved to its own virtual server, where it has received over a million hits per month since the year 2000. In the summer of 2002, Hob Nob Anyone? moved again to be hosted at Oscura Ltd, a web development and hosting company in Reading.

The site includes match reports dating back to the 1994-95 season, a forum with around 12000 members, fans' analysis, and regular news and articles.

The site also has a section on the Supporters Trust At Reading (STAR) and links with Tim Dellor and BBC Radio Berkshire Sports, and the Reading Evening Post, a local newspaper.

The site was featured in the football book Motson's National Obsession,, and was a "site of the week" in the Daily Star. In 2010 the website was given the STAR (Supporters Trust At Reading) award "for services to supporters of Reading Football Club"
