= Supporters' Trust at Reading =

Football Supporters' Society

Supporters' Trust At Reading logo

Supporters' Trust at Reading also known as STAR, is the official organisation representing the interests of supporters of Reading Football Club. STAR is the successor to Reading Football Supporters’ Club (RFSC), which was established in 1930.

== Constitution and organisation ==
STAR is the trading name of Reading Football Supporters' Society Ltd, and was incorporated in the UK in March 2002 as an industrial and provident society (IPS). On 1 August 2014 it became a Registered Society under the Co-operative and Community Benefit Societies Act 2014. Like most other supporters' trusts, STAR is a non-profit making, democratically accountable supporters' organization. It is regulated by the Financial Conduct Authority.

The trust is managed on a day-to-day basis by a board of between 12 and 15 people, at least 8 of whom are elected by the trust's members at elections held annually. Elections to the board take place by rotation every three years and any member nominated by four other members may stand for election to the Board at the Annual General Meeting, normally held in September with nominations by the end of May.

STAR board members meet at least monthly, and are responsible for the overall policy and financial direction of the Trust, including its relationship with Reading Football Club, and other football clubs, supporters' groups, the football authorities, the media and the local and wider community.

== Objectives ==
STAR has the following objectives written into its constitution:

- to strengthen the bonds between the club and the community which it serves and to represent the interests of the community in the running of the Club
- to benefit present and future members of the community served by the club by promoting encouraging and furthering the game of football as a recreational facility, sporting activity and focus for community involvement
- to facilitate the participation of supporters of the club in activities promoting football in communities throughout the United Kingdom
- to encourage the club to take proper account of the interests of its supporters and the community it serves in its decisions and to honour the contribution made by the community in the past to the life of the club
- to acquire and hold shares in the club or any company controlling the club and to be an active and growing shareholder thus giving supporters collectively the opportunity to have a stake in the Club
- to promote the full, accountable democratic and constructive involvement of supporters in the running and direction of the club, including the principle of supporter representation on the board of the Club
- to continue the work of Reading Football Supporters’ Club, with particular reference to away travel, ticket priority and Fans’ Forums.

== History ==
Reading Football Supporters’ Club (RFSC) was founded in December 1930, largely through the inspiration of a local journalist Mr H Sirett, at a time when the football club was financially hard-pressed and facing relegation from Division Two. The first meeting was in the Railway Tavern, Greyfriars Road. Though relegation happened RFSC continued to raise funds on an extensive basis, donating funds to buy a forward (Tommy Tait) through providing refreshments in the Elm Park ground and improving the terraced accommodation.

In the post-war years RFSC ran the football club's offices and an extremely successful lottery scheme. The RFSC chairman, Jim Brooks, was also for a time on the board of Reading FC such was the supporters’ club's financial contribution. During the 1980s much of RFSC's work and infrastructure (Lottery, refreshments, souvenirs) was taken in-house by the football club though RFSC continued to run the popular Royals Rendezvous Bar on the Tilehurst Road at Elm Park and away travel coaches.

When Reading FC moved to the new Madejski Stadium in the south of the town in 1998 the role of RFSC changed substantially. It ceased to have access to a supporters’ bar and it ceased to fund-raise for the football club. Instead it concentrated on being a stronger representative of the fans’ voice, on creating member benefits and on away travel. Regular Fans Forums and discounts at the club shop were among the new benefits.

The recommendations in the Labour government's Football Task Force (1999) endorsed a new form of supporters’ organisation, the supporters trust. RFSC decided to take advantage of this opportunity and a working party under the leadership of ex-RFSC chairman Roger Titford and including several non-members of RFSC launched STAR (Supporters Trust at Reading) on 18 March 2002 in the Jazz Café at the stadium.

By combining supporters’ club benefits with a supporters’ trust structure, STAR developed its membership base. Since its formation, it has met regularly with the club's senior management and, as a shareholder, has attended the club's annual general meetings.

== Activities ==
STAR is an active participant within Supporters Direct and the Football Supporters' Federation.

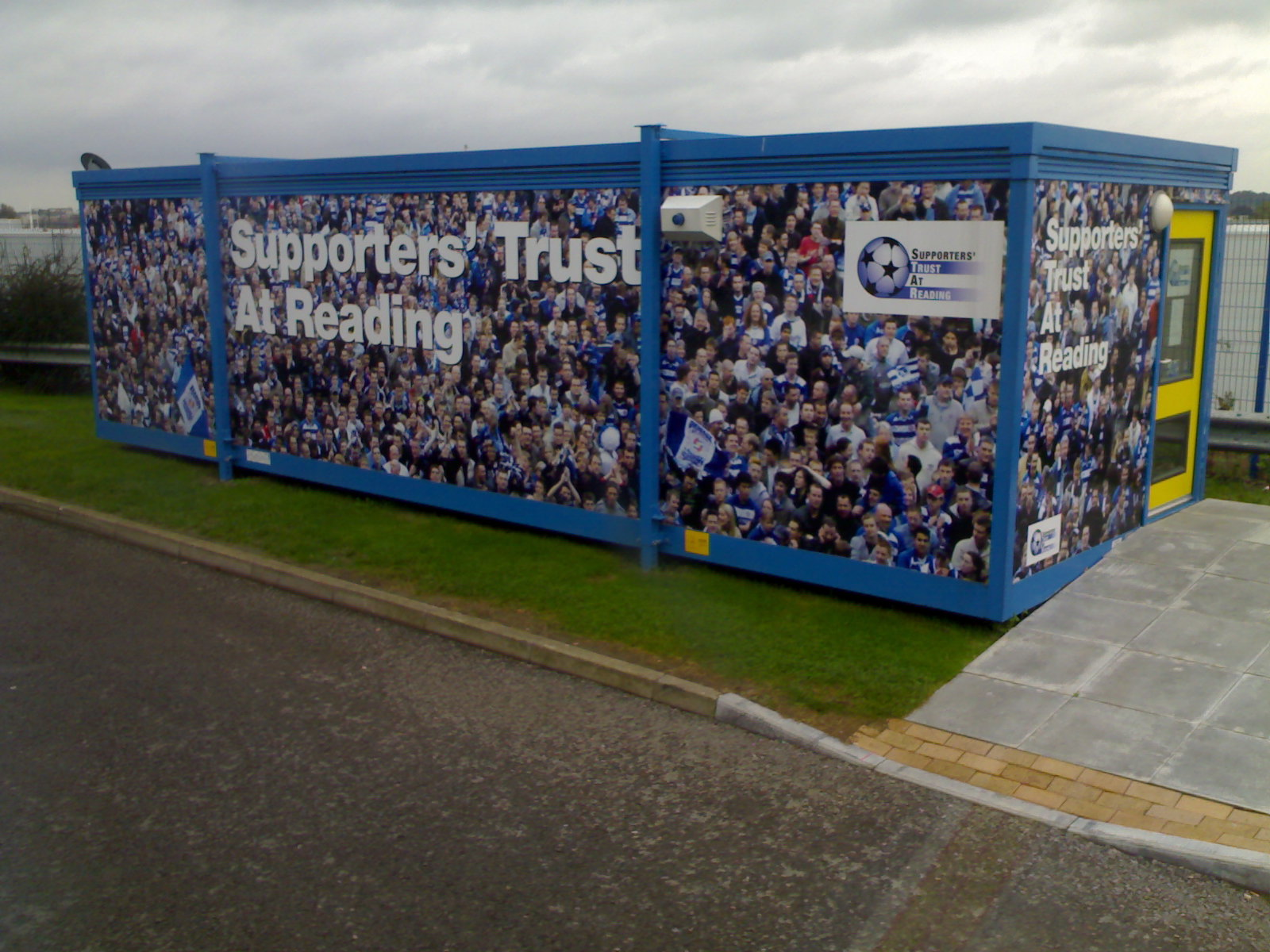
The STAR Base headquarters is situated outside the East Stand of the Madejski Stadium

STAR runs coaches for STAR members to all Reading FC away matches, with bookings taken in the STAR HQ behind the East Stand at the Madejski Stadium. STAR holds at least 3 Fans' Forums every season. Guests have included Sir John Madejski, Steve Coppell, Kevin Doyle, Marcus Hahnemann, Brian McDermott (footballer), Nigel Adkins and Alex Pearce.

Representatives of STAR meet with Reading's Senior Management Team every six weeks in order to discuss supporters' issues, and also have on-going contact with the relevant people at Reading FC such as customer services or stadium manager as appropriate.

In January 2006 STAR presented Reading with the "STAR Ticketing Blueprint", outlining ways in which Reading's fans’ believe that the club's ticketing policies should operate in the Premier League.

In April 2006 STAR organised the "Raise the Hoops" event which involved Reading supporters filling the Madejski Stadium with hoops before the Championship match with Queens Park Rangers.

In August 2006 STAR ran a highly successful campaign to persuade Reading FC to grant broadcasting rights for live matches to BBC Radio Berkshire after these were set to be granted exclusively to intermediate station Reading 107.

In August 2006, at half-time in Reading's first Premier League match, versus Middlesbrough at the Madejski Stadium, STAR was presented with a Football League Championship Winners Medal, in recognition of the contribution which STAR and all Reading supporters had made to the previous Championship winning season.

Between August and December 2007, STAR organised the production of a book entitled "Reading 'Til I Die" - an oral history collection featuring the memories and stories of a number of Reading supporters, aged between 7 and 93.

A fuller list of STAR's efforts and effects can be seen on their website. These include creating the No.13 fans flag, organising stewarding forums, launching a travel service for disabled supporters (Readibus), enabling ‘exiled’ supporters to get away tickets, staging a re-match of Reading FC's first ever game in 1872 and running coach tours to Flanders and the Somme to commemorate Reading players who gave their lives during the 1914-18 war.
