= Hartland High School (Reading) =

Location
- Hartland Road; Reading, Berkshire, RG2 8AF; England; 51.425709°N 0.961286°W

Information
- Type: Academy
- Religious affiliation: None
- Established: 2006
- Founder: John Madejski
- Local authority: Reading
- Specialist: Sports Academy
- Department for Education URN: 130247 Tables
- Head teacher: Emily Davey
- Gender: Mixed
- Age: 11 to 19
- Enrolment: 900
- Capacity: 1000
- Houses: Amethyst, Amber, Ruby, Emerald, and Sapphire
- Former name: Thamesbridge College
- Website: hartlandhigh.co.uk

Hartland High School is an 11–19 years old academy in Reading, Berkshire, England. It was previously known as Ashmead School, Thamesbridge College and the John Madjeski Academy.

The school formed part of the White Horse Federation Trust until 2025, where it is now part of the Greenshaw Learning Trust. Emily Davey became the principal of Hartland High School in 2025

Hartland’ curriculum includes technology, music, textiles, computing, physical education, history, geography, drama, PSHE (personal, social, health, and economic education), art, science, English, and mathematics.

== History ==
The academy was officially established on 1 September 2006 following the closure of its 11-16 predecessor, Thamesbridge College. Thamesbridge College was previously known as Ashmead School. It was officially opened by Tony Blair on 5 December 2007.

The new buildings were opened in 2010, with Sir John Madejski cutting the ribbon. In 2017, Madejski described financing the academy as "his proudest achievement".

The academy last achieved a "good" Ofsted inspection outcome in 2008. It was found to be "inadequate" in its most recent full inspection in October 2023. Following this, the academy received a termination warning notice from the Regional Director at the Department for Education.

In January 2025 the academy was transferred from the White Horse Federation to Greenshaw Learning Trust, to enable the academy to benefit from close collaboration with the Trust’s other schools.

In September 2025 the academy was renamed to Hartland High School following a community consultation and vote.

== Architecture ==
The building was designed by international architecture firm Wilkinson Eyre and it was shortlisted for an award at the World Architecture Festival 2008.
