= Ronnie Blackman =

English footballer

Personal information
- Full name: Ronald Henry Blackman
- Date of birth: 2 April 1925
- Place of birth: Cosham, England
- Date of death: 16 February 2016 (aged 90)
- Position: Forward

Senior career*
Years	Team	Apps	(Gls)
- Gosport Borough
1946–1954	Reading	218	(158)
1954–1955	Nottingham Forest	11	(3)
1955–1958	Ipswich Town	27	(12)
- Tonbridge
Total		256	(173)
- * Club domestic league appearances and goals

Ronald Henry Blackman (2 April 1925 – 16 February 2016), known as Ronnie or Ron Blackman, was an English professional footballer.

Blackman played a vital role in the Reading team that finished second in the 1951–52 Third Division, narrowly missing out on promotion. Towards the end of that season, within the space of three weeks, Blackman scored a total of 10 goals at Elm Park – including five goals against Southend United on 14 April and four against Bournemouth on 3 May to end the season on a high note. He scored 39 league goals that season and another goal in the FA Cup, a league club record which has yet to be equalled six decades later, although Trevor Senior edged ahead by scoring 41 goals in all competitions in 1983–84.

Blackman died on 16 February 2016. A minute's applause was held in his honour before Reading's FA Cup tie with West Bromwich Albion on 19 February 2016.
