= Carzone =

Irish car dealing platform

- The current logo, in use since 2016
- Industry: Automotive
- Founded: January 1, 1998; 28 years ago in Dublin, Ireland
- Parent: Mediahuis
- Website: www.carzone.ie

Carzone is an Irish online automotive marketplace for new and used vehicles. Founded in 1998 and headquartered in Dublin, Ireland, the platform carries vehicle advertisements from motor dealers and private sellers. Carzone has been owned by Mediahuis Ireland since 2022.

== History ==
Carzone was founded in Dublin in 1998 and was operated by Webzone Ltd, a web design and production company. Carzone is available across multiple devices with a dedicated iPhone App, Android App, Desktop Website and Mobile Site. In 2004 Carzone was sold to the Guardian Media Group (GMG). Trader Media Group (TMG) a subsidiary of GMG, acquired Webzone Ltd, the Dublin holding company of the motor website. Trader Media Group is the predecessor of Auto Trader Group.

In October 2022, Mediahuis Ireland, the publisher formerly known as Independent News & Media (INM), acquired Carzone from Auto Trader Group for €30 million. Mediahuis is a newspaper and magazine publishing, distribution, printing, TV, radio and online media company founded in 2014 with operations in Belgium, the Netherlands, Ireland, Luxembourg and Germany.
