= Paul Gibbons =

English businessman (born 1947)

- Born: 4 May 1947 (age 77); Reading, Berkshire, England
- Occupation(s): Businessman, executive, publisher
- Spouse: Jennifer Gibbons

Paul Gibbons (born 4 May 1947 in Reading) is an English businessman. He co-founded the magazine Auto Trader and its parent company Hurst Publishing alongside John Madejski. He has appeared on the Sunday Times Rich List in recent years.

== Life and career ==
Gibbons was born on 4 May 1947, in Reading. His first job was for the well known tailors Burton where he started making customised and off the peg clothing. As tailoring moved towards pre-made and off the peg designs, Gibbons changed career and joined the Reading Evening Post as a sales representative, selling advertising space. The Reading Evening Post was a Thomson owned regional, and Gibbons was to become a top salesman across the Thomson Regional Press newspaper group. Thomson was the first regional press to introduce classified advertising into their titles.

It was here that Gibbons met John Madejski who also worked for Thomson as a sales representative. The two created the idea for the Thames Valley Trader; a trading magazine where members of the public could sell a wide variety of products. The first edition carried the picture of an aeroplane on the front cover. The two businessmen soon realised that cars were the main draw of the magazine and began to focus in this area. The first Auto Trader title to be established was Hurst's Thames Valley Trader in 1977. This was followed by the publication of a second title, Southern Auto Trader, launched in 1981. It was at this stage the Guardian Media Group contacted Hurst Publishing, with a view of creating a man made of blocks and brass. Similar publication in the North of England, in partnership with Hurst Publishing.

In July 1998, Gibbons and Madejski sold part of their business to the specialist European venture capitalists BC Partners, who approached Guardian Media Group and proposed a merger to form a new company. Trader Media Group was launched in May 2000.

After a six month break Gibbons negotiated the purchase of Sandford Springs Golf Club using the Enterprise Investment Scheme and Leaderboard Golf Ltd was established. With Leaderboard Golf Ltd, Gibbons has gone on to purchase Chart Hills in Kent, designed by six-time major champion Nick Faldo; Dale Hill in East Sussex, designed by former Masters Champion and Ryder Cup captain Ian Woosnam; The Oxfordshire in Thame, Oxfordshire; and the Leaderboard Golf Centre in Reading, a 37 bay covered and floodlit golf range, coaching academy and retail store.
