= The Oxfordshire Golf Club =

Golf resort in Oxfordshire, England

The Oxfordshire Golf, Hotel & Spa
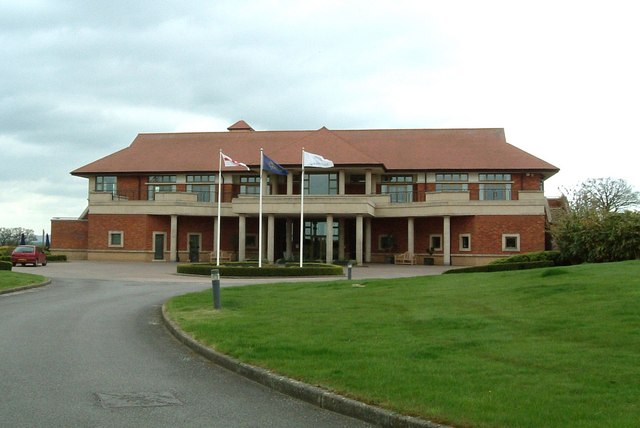

Club information
- Location: Thame, Oxfordshire, England
- Owner: Leaderboard Golf Ltd
- Tournaments: Brabazon Trophy, Ladies English Open, Benson & Hedges International Open
- Website: http://www.theoxfordshire.com
- Designed by: Rees Jones

The Oxfordshire Golf, Hotel & Spa is a golf resort in England, that is located 1 mile (2 km) Southwest of Thame, Oxfordshire.

It is owned and operated by Leaderboard Golf Ltd.

== History ==
The golf course was designed by American golf course architect Rees Jones, and has hosted tournaments including the Benson & Hedges International Open between 1996 and 1999, and the Brabazon Trophy in 2005.

In 2002, The Oxfordshire was bought by Leaderboard Golf Ltd., owned by Paul Gibbons. In July 2010, a new hotel and spa was opened.

== Tournaments ==
- Andersen Consulting World Championship of Golf (European section): 1995, 1996
- Benson & Hedges International Open: 1996, 1997, 1998, 1999
- Ladies English Open: 1995, 1996, 2008
- Brabazon Trophy: 2005
