= Arthur Roston Bourke =

English football referee

Arthur Roston Bourke was an association football referee in the late 19th and early 20th centuries, was vice-president of the London Football Association until October 1900, and principal of Holloway College in London. He was involved in the founding of the first Referees' Association and was appointed as the organisation's first honorary secretary in 1893.

As well as officiating football games Bourke ran his own team, known as A. Roston Bourke's XI. Roston Bourke's XI were the first team to face Reading on their new Elm Park ground in 1896. He was initially suspended by the Football Association for playing this match as his team was not FA-registered, but the suspension was later overturned.

Arthur was the son of William Roston Bourke who was a member of the London School Board, representing Finsbury from 1882 to 1897, and headmaster of Holloway College.
