= Autotrader Group =

Classified advertising business

Autotrader Group plc
- Type: Public
- Traded as: LSE: AUTO; FTSE 100 Component
- Industry: Automotive trading via Internet and mobile
- Founded: 1977
- Founders: John Madejski, Paul Gibbons, Peter Taylor
- Headquarters: Manchester, England, UK
- Area served: United Kingdom
- Key people: Matt Davies (Chairperson); Nathan Coe (CEO); Catherine Faiers (COO); Jamie Warner (CFO)
- Products: Vehicle advertisements
- Revenue: ▲£624.3 million (2026)
- Operating income: ▲£392.7 million (2026)
- Net income: ▲£293.9 million (2026)
- Subsidiaries: Autorama (acquired in 2022) Carzone (former) AutoTrader.co.za (former)
- Website: www.autotrader.co.uk

Autotrader Group plc, commonly known as Autotrader, is a British automotive online marketplace and classified advertising business. Autotrader is listed on the London Stock Exchange trading under the ticker symbol AUTO, and is a constituent of the FTSE 100 Index.

== History ==
=== Early history: twentieth century ===
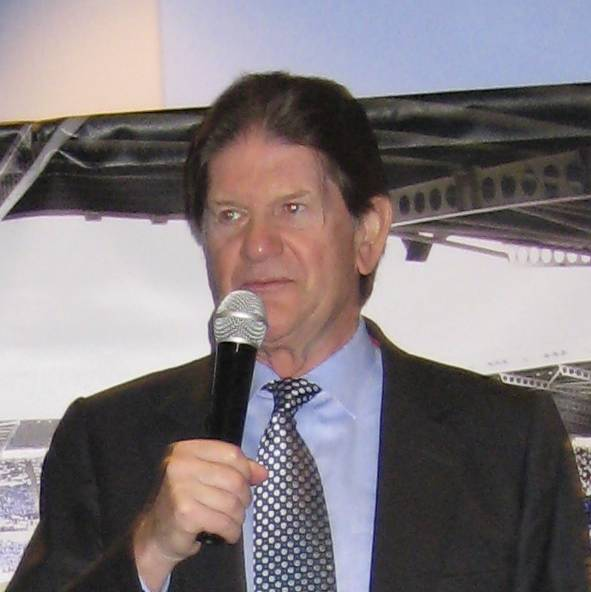
Autotrader founder, John Madejski, pictured in 2007

The company was founded by John Madejski, Paul Gibbons and Peter Taylor as Thames Valley Trader in 1977.

It was rebranded Auto Trader in 1988. The first title was followed by the publication of a second one, Southern Auto Trader.

The company launched a website, Autotrader.co.uk, in 1996, giving people the ability to buy or sell a car online.

British international investment firm BC Partners bought a stake in the business from John Madejski in July 1998 for £260m; then Guardian Media Group, who had acquired Automart in 1982, merged that business with Hurst Publishing in May 2000 so creating Trader Media.

=== 21st century and evolution to digital only ===
The company launched a mobile website in 2002, initially using the WAP protocol.

In July 2008, the company launched a .mobi site, and in July 2009, separate versions for differing handset capability levels were released.

The company developed its mobile offering further from March 2010, releasing applications enabling users to search for vehicles on iOS, Android and Windows Mobile devices using augmented reality features.

In April 2011 a group called the Motor Traders Advertising Union launched an online petition and proposed a mass pull out by auto dealers who objected to an increase in the fee for a dealership to advertise a car, from £7 to £8.50, before any discounts for bulk advertisers.

Sales of the print magazine dwindled in line with the decline of the print industry. By July 2012, circulation had dropped to an average of 87,000 copies a week and down to 27,000 in March 2013.

In June 2013, after thirty six years, the final editions of the printed magazine were published, with the company concentrating on its online business.

In October 2013, AutoTrader.co.za (Auto Trader South Africa) a subsidiary of the company, was sold off to become an independent South African company.

In January 2014, Apax Partners bought the business from Guardian Media Group for £600m.

In March 2014, the company changed its name from Trader Media Group to Auto Trader, and in March 2015, Auto Trader Group launched an initial public offering, with a market capitalisation of about £2bn, floated on the London Stock Exchange and became a constituent of the FTSE 250.

In 2020 it was reported that the company had created a data lake and intelligence platform using services including Amazon Web Services and Google's Looker, and was working to foster a ‘culture of data’ internally by setting up a data academy for employees.

The company granted four months of free advertising to its retailer customers to support them during the COVID-19 pandemic.

In 2022, the company began a partnership with the Office for National Statistics sharing its used car pricing data to power its official measures of inflation, including the Consumer Prices Index.

Also in 2022, the company acquired Autorama, owner of Vanarama, one of the UK’s largest transactional marketplaces for leasing new vehicles and sponsor of the Football National League.

The company changed its name from Auto Trader Group plc to Autotrader Group plc on 14 January 2026.

== Acquisitions ==
Autotrader’s acquisitions
Company	Year of acquisition	Acquired company’s activities
TNT Group	2000	Publisher of titles for Australians, New Zealanders and South Africans in the UK
Carzone.ie	2005	Website for motor dealers and consumers in Ireland
2nd Byte	2006	Provides used car digital marketing services to car manufacturers and franchised dealers
Deltapoint Associates	2012	Automotive software
Motor Trade Delivery	2017	Vehicle moving service
Dealer Auction	2018	Formed a joint venture with Cox Automotive providing an online B23B auction platform for cars
KeeResources	2019	Provider of software, vehicle data, and digital software to the automotive industry
AutoConvert	2020	Finance, insurance and compliance software platform
Autorama	2022	Online vehicle leasing platform

== Marketplace and products ==
=== Online marketplace ===
At the core of Autotrader is its online marketplace, where consumers buy and sell cars and other vehicles, and where car dealerships advertise and sell their stock, both new and used, to consumers. Retailers pay to advertise vehicles, and consumers also pay a fee unless the transaction is less than £1,000.

=== Deal Builder ===
Launched in mid 2025, Deal Builder was developed to support connected online and offline journeys, enabling buyers to add a part exchange, apply for finance and reserve vehicles through Autotrader. In November 2025 Autotrader made Deal Builder non-optional for dealers advertising; this caused widespread backlash from dealers resulting in many removing their vehicles from the marketplace.

=== AutoTrader.co.uk website ===
The Autotrader website was ranked first in the UK in the vehicles category by Similarweb and Eighth globally in January 2024.

=== Mobile app ===
As of May 2026, Autotrader's mobile app had ratings of 4.8/5 on the Apple App Store and 4.8/5 on Google Play.

=== YouTube channel ===
Autotrader operates a YouTube channel where it publishes videos such as car reviews, car comparisons, drag races, and buying guides. Television presenter and automotive journalist Rory Reid joined Autotrader as YouTube Director in December 2019, and fronts the videos on the channel.
