= Roger Smee =

English footballer

Roger Smee MBE
Personal information
- Full name: Roger Guy Smee
- Date of birth: 14 August 1948 (age 78)
- Place of birth: Reading, England
- Position: Forward

Youth career
- Chelsea

Senior career*
Years	Team	Apps	(Gls)
1966–1967	Chelsea	0	(0)
1967–1970	Reading	50	(16)
1970	→ Chelmsford City (loan)	12	(10)
1970	Hillingdon Borough		
1970–1972	Hereford United		
1972–1973	VG Oostende		
1973–1974	Reading	9	(1)
- * Club domestic league appearances and goals

Roger Guy Smee MBE (born 14 August 1948) is an English former footballer who played as a forward.

== Career ==
In January 1967, Reading signed Smee from Chelsea, where he had played in the youth set-up. On 3 March 1967, Smee scored on his Reading debut in a 2–0 win against Shrewsbury Town. Smee scored nine goals in 15 appearances in the 1966–67 season following his transfer. Following suffering a broken leg, Smee was deemed surplus to requirements by manager Jack Mansell and dropped down to non-League football, firstly being loaned to Chelmsford City, before signing for Hillingdon Borough and Hereford United.

In 1972, Smee signed for Belgian club VG Oostende, before moving back to Reading, where he made nine further Football League appearances, scoring once.

== Post-playing career ==
Following his playing career, Smee moved into business. In May 1983, Oxford United chairman Robert Maxwell announced his intention to acquire a majority shareholding in Reading and merge Reading and Oxford into a club named Thames Valley Royals. Smee and Reading director Roy Tranter opposed such a merger and stopped Maxwell's plans following a boardroom vote at Reading between the Maxwell merger offer and a rival bid headed by Smee. In July 1983, Smee became chairman of Reading. During Smee's time as chairman, Reading reached Wembley for the first time, winning the 1988 Full Members' Cup Final as well as gaining promotion from the Fourth Division in 1983–84, winning the Third Division in 1985–86 and achieving the club's highest finish in 1987. In 1990, Smee was replaced as Reading chairman by John Madejski, as a result of the early 1990s recession.

In 2013, Smee was awarded an MBE for his work with young people in Berkshire.

Smee now spends much of his time on his duties as the President of Berkshire Youth, a youth charity based out of Berkshire that runs youth centres and detached youth work throughout West Berkshire and Reading.
