= Unissued stock =

Unissued stock is stock that has been authorized in a company's charter, but has never been sold. It differs from Treasury stock (in the UK, Treasury shares, as treasury stock means something else), in that treasury stock has been issued, and bought back by the company, whereas unissued stock has never been issued.
