= Attilio Fresia =

Italian soccer player (1891-1923)

Personal information
- Full name: Attilio Fresia
- Date of birth: 5 March 1891
- Place of birth: Turin, Italy
- Date of death: 14 April 1923 (aged 32)
- Place of death: Modena, Italy
- Position: Midfielder

Senior career*
Years	Team	Apps	(Gls)
1907–1908	Piemonte	?	(?)
1908–1909	Torino	5	(0)
1909–1910	Piemonte	?	(?)
1910–1911	Torino	1	(0)
1911–1912	Piemonte	?	(?)
1912–1913	Andrea Doria	?	(?)
1913	Geona	10	(0)
1913–1914	Reading	?	(?)
1914–1918	Modena	0	(0)
1919–1920	Livorno	8	(1)
1920	Modena	?	(?)

International career
1913	Italy	1	(0)

Managerial career
- 1919–1920: Livorno
- 1920–1921: Palestra Itália
- 1922–1923: Modena
- * Club domestic league appearances and goals

Attilio Fresia (Italian pronunciation: [atˈtiːljo ˈfrɛːzja]; 5 March 1891 – 14 April 1923) was an Italian footballer who played as a midfielder. He represented the Italy national football team once, appearing on 1 May 1913 in a friendly match against Belgium in a 1–0 home win.
