= Reading F.C. =

Association football club in England

Reading
- Full name: Reading Football Club
- Nicknames: The Royals, The Biscuitmen
- Founded: 25 December 1871; 154 years ago
- Ground: Madejski Stadium
- Capacity: 24,161
- Owner: Redwood Holdings Limited
- Chairman: Rob Couhig
- Manager: Leam Richardson
- League: EFL League One
- 2025–26: EFL League One, 12th of 24
- Website: readingfc.co.uk
Home colours	Away colours

Reading Football Club (/ˈrɛdɪŋ/ RED-ing) is a professional football club based in Reading, Berkshire, England. They compete in EFL League One, the third level of the English football league system. They play their home matches at the Select Car Leasing Stadium in the RG2 area of Reading.

Reading are nicknamed The Royals after the Royal County of Berkshire, and were previously known as The Biscuitmen, due to the town's association with biscuit maker Huntley & Palmers. Established in 1871, the club is one of the oldest teams in England, but did not join The Football League until 1920, and first played in the top tier of English football league system in the 2006–07 season. The club competed in the 2012–13 Premier League season, having gained promotion at the end of the 2011–12 season after winning the Championship, but were relegated after just one season back in the top flight.

Reading won the 1987–88 Full Members' Cup and were one of only two Second Division clubs to lift the trophy, beating Luton Town 4–1 in the final at Wembley. The club's best performance in the FA Cup was reaching the semi-finals which they achieved twice: in 1926–27 and 2014–15.

The club played at Elm Park for 102 years, from 1896 to 1998. In 1998, the club moved to the new Madejski Stadium, which was named after the club's former chairman Sir John Madejski. In 2021, the club announced that the ground would be known as the Select Car Leasing Stadium for the subsequent decade for sponsorship reasons.

The club holds the record for the number of successive league wins at the start of a season, with a total of 13 wins at the start of the 1985–86 Third Division campaign. During their 2005–06 Football League Championship season, Reading set a new record for the highest number of points gained in a professional league season, at 106. Reading then achieved their highest finish of eighth in the 2006–07 Premier League, their first season as a top flight club.

== History ==
=== Formation and gradual rise (1871–1991) ===
Reading were formed on 25 December 1871, following a public meeting at the Bridge Street Rooms organised by Joseph Edward Sydenham, who would go on to be club secretary. The early matches were played at Reading Recreation Ground, and later the club held fixtures at Reading Cricket Ground, Coley Recreation Ground and Caversham Cricket Ground. The switch to professionalism in 1895 resulted in the need for a bigger ground and, to this end, the club moved again, to the purpose-built Elm Park on 5 September 1896. In 1913, Reading had a successful tour of Italy, prompting the leading sports newspaper Corriere della Sera to write, "Without doubt, Reading FC are the finest foreign team seen in Italy". Attilio Fresia moved to Reading as a result of the tour, becoming the first Italian to play in English football.

The team from the 1926–27 season

Reading were elected to the Football League Third Division South of the Football League in 1920. The club were promoted to the Second Division, following a Third Division South title win in 1926. Reading's best performance in the FA Cup came in 1926–27 when they lost to eventual winners Cardiff City at Wolverhampton in the semi-final, a placement the club would not match again until 2015, when they lost to holders Arsenal in the semi-final. The attendance at the 1–0 victory over Brentford in the fifth round set a new attendance record for Elm Park, at 33,042 people. This remains the highest attendance at a Reading home match. Reading lost their place in the Second Division in May 1931, and remained in Third Division South until the outbreak of World War II. The club won the Southern Section Cup, beating Bristol City in the two-legged final in 1938, and when taking part in the regional London War League and Cup competitions, gained another honour by beating Brentford in the London War Cup Final of 1941 by 3–2 at Stamford Bridge.

When League football resumed after the war, Reading quickly came to prominence once again. The club's record victory, 10–2 versus Crystal Palace, was recorded in September 1946, and Reading twice finished runners-up in the Third (South), in 1948–49 and 1951–52, but they were denied a return to Division Two as only the champions were promoted. Reading were relegated to the fourth tier of English football for the first time in the 1971–72 season. A return to the Third Division was achieved, following a third-placed finish in 1975–76, but the club suffered immediate relegation. The 1978–79 season saw Reading win the Fourth Division to win promotion back to the Third Division.

Relegation was suffered in 1982–83. Towards the end of that season, Oxford United chairman Robert Maxwell announced that he had completed a deal to merge Oxford and Reading into a single club – Thames Valley Royals. Maxwell claimed that both clubs were on the verge of bankruptcy and having a united team was required for the Thames Valley region to retain a Football League club. The proposed amalgamation was prevented by the actions of Roy Tranter, a Reading director, and Roger Smee, a former Reading player. Smee disputed the legitimacy of the controlling interest in Reading held by the three board members that supported the merger plan. Tranter launched a legal challenge to the sale of certain shares on 22 April 1983. The supporters of the plan allies resigned under pressure from the rest of the Reading board in May 1983. At an extraordinary shareholders' meeting in July, Smee took over the club to end the amalgamation plans.

The side's moment of cup glory came in 1988 when they won the Simod Cup, beating a number of top-flight sides en route to their Wembley win over Luton Town. Reading were promoted to the Second Division as champions in 1986 under the management of Ian Branfoot, but were relegated back to the Third Division in 1988.

=== Onwards and upwards (1991–2005) ===
The appointment of Mark McGhee as player-manager, shortly after the takeover by John Madejski, in 1991 saw Reading move forward. They were crowned champions of the new Division Two in 1994. Thirty-five-year-old striker Jimmy Quinn was put in charge of the first team alongside midfielder Mick Gooding and guided Reading to runners-up in the final Division One table – only to be denied automatic promotion because of the streamlining of the Premier League, from 22 teams to 20. In 1995, Reading had eased past Tranmere Rovers in the play-off semi-finals and looked to have booked their place in the Premier League only to lose 4–3 against Bolton Wanderers in the final having been 2–0 up and missed a penalty at half-time. Quinn and Gooding's contracts were not renewed two years later after Reading had slid into the bottom half of Division One. Their successor, Terry Bullivant, lasted less than a season before being dismissed in March 1998. Reading were relegated back to Division Two at the end of the 1997–98 season.

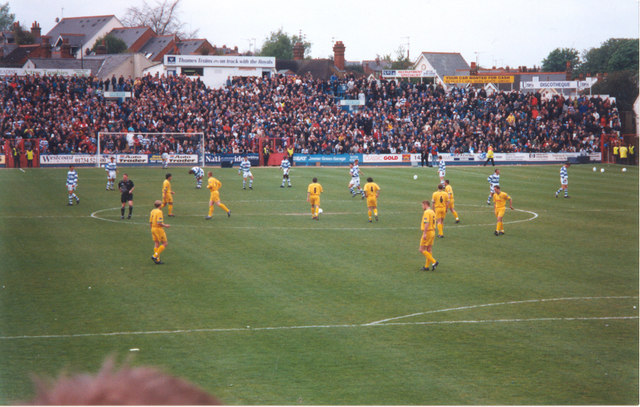
The last competitive match played at Elm Park between Reading and Norwich City in May 1998

The year 1998 also saw Reading move into the new 24,200 all-seater Madejski Stadium, named after chairman John Madejski. Tommy Burns had taken over from Terry Bullivant but lasted just 18 months before being replaced by Alan Pardew, who had previously been reserve team manager before being released. The club finished third in 2000–01 qualifying for the play-offs, losing 2–3 in the final against Walsall at the Millennium Stadium in Cardiff. Reading returned to Division One for 2002–03 after finishing runners-up in Division Two. The following season, they finished fourth in Division One and qualified for the play-offs, where they lost in the semi-final to Wolverhampton Wanderers. Pardew moved to West Ham United the following October and was replaced by Steve Coppell.

=== Rise to the Premier League and yo-yo years (2005–2013) ===
Reading won the 2005–06 Championship with a league record 106 points, scoring 99 goals and losing only twice. They were promoted to English football's top division for the first time in their history. The 2006–07 season saw Reading make their first appearance in the top flight of English football. Reading defied pre-season predictions of relegation to finish the season in eighth place with 55 points. Reading turned down the chance to play in the UEFA Intertoto Cup. In the run up to their second season in the Premier League, Reading took part in the 2007 Peace Cup in South Korea. This second season was less successful, however, and Reading were relegated back to the Championship.

Reading started the 2008–09 season with a 15 match unbeaten home run. They finished fourth and qualify for the play-offs, where they lost to Burnley in the semi-final. Manager Steve Coppell resigned just hours after the game, replaced by Brendan Rodgers. Rodgers left the club by mutual consent on 16 December 2009 and Brian McDermott made caretaker manager the same day. In the 2010–11 FA Cup, Reading reached the quarter-final, where they lost 1–0 to Manchester City at Etihad Stadium, Reading eventually finished fifth in the Championship to qualify for the division's play-offs. After beating Cardiff City in the semi-finals, they lost 4–2 to Swansea City in the final at Wembley. In the 2011–12 season, a streak of good form in the second half of the season, ensured promotion back to the Premier League on 17 April 2012 with 1–0 home win against Nottingham Forest.

On 21 January 2012 it was reported that Madejski planned to relinquish control of the club by selling a 51% stake for £40 million to Thames Sports Investments, a Russian consortium headed by Anton Zingarevich. As part of the deal, Madejski would continue as chairman before becoming honorary life president. Madejski's ownership of the club ended on 29 May 2012.

McDermott led Reading to their first Premier League win of the 2012–13 season on 17 November 2012 at their 11th attempt, defeating Everton 2–1 at home. On 11 March 2013, however, he left his position at Reading. Nigel Adkins was then appointed as manager, though he was unable to save them from relegation after drawing with Queens Park Rangers 0–0 on 28 April 2013 at Loftus Road.

Reading's progress through the English football league system from 1920 to present.

=== Return to the Championship (2013–2023) ===
The following season back in the Championship saw Reading make two high-profile signings in Wayne Bridge and Royston Drenthe in hope of an immediate return to the Premier League. Reading, however, missed out on the playoffs because of a last minute winner from Brighton & Hove Albion's Leonardo Ulloa.

In 2014–15, the club was under a high threat of administration, causing departures of Sean Morrison and Adam Le Fondre and a Thai consortium taking over the club. A good start to Nigel Adkins' second season in charge was followed by a poor run of results that ended with his sacking after a 6–1 away defeat to Birmingham City with Steve Clarke taking over the next day. Despite almost getting relegated to League One, the club embarked on a successful FA Cup journey, reaching the semi-final where they lost 2–1 to Arsenal at Wembley. The following season saw the club bring in many players in the hopes of gaining promotion, but the club finished 17th.

In the summer leading up to the 2016–17 season the club announced the departure of Brian McDermott and was later replaced by former Manchester United defender Jaap Stam. Under Stam, Reading achieved their highest finish since relegation back to the Championship by finishing third and reaching the play-offs, where they beat Fulham on aggregate before facing Huddersfield Town in the final at Wembley where they lost on penalties following 0–0 draw after extra time. In 2017, Chinese investors Dai Yongge and Dai Xiu Li acquired the club.

The team languished towards the bottom of the table for most of the 2017–18 season. On 21 March 2018, Stam resigned as manager after a nine-game winless run. Two days later, on 23 March 2018, Paul Clement was appointed as Reading's new manager; the club finished the season in 20th place, avoiding relegation by three points.

Clement was dismissed on 6 December 2018 after poor results left the club outside of the relegation zone only on goal difference. He was replaced by José Gomes on 22 December, who steered the club away from relegation to finish 20th again. However, after a slow start to the 2019–20 season, Gomes was dismissed after less than a year in charge with the team in the relegation zone in October 2019. Sporting director Mark Bowen was promoted to the role as his replacement a week later and led the team to finish 14th before departing the club in August 2020.

Former Chicago Fire boss Veljko Paunović was appointed manager on 29 August 2020. The team got off to an excellent start to the 2020–21 season, winning seven of their first eight league games. However, the team's form faded after injuries to several key players and they eventually narrowly missed out of the play-offs, finishing seventh.

On 17 November 2021 it was confirmed Reading would be deducted six points due to breaching the EFL's profitability and sustainability rules. Over five years, the club reported pre-tax losses of £146m, way beyond the EFL's limit of a £13m annual pre-tax loss. In 2021, the club spent 234% of its revenue on player wages.

Following a 3–2 away victory over Preston North End in February 2022, manager Veljko Paunović left by mutual consent, with Paul Ince being placed in interim charge of the team alongside academy manager Michael Gilkes. On 16 May, Ince became the team's permanent manager, with Mark Bowen returning as head of football operations.

On 1 March 2023, the team was reported to be facing another six-point deduction for breaching profitability and sustainability rules. The club accepted the penalty on 4 April 2023, enforced with immediate effect. A week later, on 11 April, Ince left after a run of eight games without a win, leaving the club in 22nd place, one point from safety. Under-21 manager Noel Hunt was placed in interim charge until the end of the season. The club was relegated from the Championship on 4 May 2023 after 10 years in the second tier. Without the six point deduction, Reading would have finished on 50 points, escaping relegation.

=== League One struggles and club for sale (2023–present) ===
In June 2023, Reading were charged by the EFL with failing to pay their players on time and in full, in October and November 2022, and April 2023, and with non-payment of taxes – charges that meant Reading started their 2023–24 League One season with a points deduction. Following the EFL's action, Reading fans groups united to launch a campaign, Sell Before We Dai, urging owner Dai Yongge to sell the club, calling his stewardship "an unmitigated disaster" and citing the club's "excruciating financial losses". On 28 July, the club was placed under another transfer embargo because of the unpaid taxes. On 2 August, Dai was reported to be seeking new investors to bring financial stability to the club.

Meanwhile, on 26 June 2023, Reading announced the provisional appointment of Rubén Sellés as their new manager, confirmed on 14 July, after his visa application was successful.

On 16 August 2023, after one win and two defeats in their opening three league fixtures, Reading had a point deducted (their third deduction in three consecutive seasons), and a further three-point deduction suspended, for failing to pay players fully and on time during the 2022–23 season. Dai Yongge was ordered to pay 125% of the club's forecast monthly wages into a designated account. After failing to comply, the suspended points deduction was applied on 13 September, and Dai faced a misconduct charge. On 13 January 2024, Reading's match against Port Vale was abandoned after home fans invaded the pitch to protest about Dai's ownership of the club. On 27 February 2024, Reading received their second EFL points deduction of the season, being docked two more points for failing to make HMRC payments within an 80-day limit. At the end of April 2024, the club finished the League One season in 17th position. The ongoing financial difficulties caused the women's team to withdraw from the Women's Championship on 30 June.

An attempted takeover by former Wycombe Wanderers owner Rob Couhig collapsed in September 2024, a bid by former Reading chairman Roger Smee ended in December 2024, and negotiations over another (unnamed) takeover bid expired in February 2025. In late February 2025, local MP Yuan Yang backed a supporters' group petition calling for an inquiry into the club's governance since May 2012, while the club entered into exclusive talks with another potential buyer.

In March 2025, Dai was given until 4 April 2025 to sell the club after the EFL disqualified him under its Owners' and Directors' Test. The sale deadline was subsequently extended to 22 April 2025; on that date, the club said it had agreed terms with a buyer, and the EFL extended its deadline to complete a deal to 5 May 2025. On 3 May, it was announced that a sale in principle had been agreed with Couhig; the EFL deadline was initially extended into early May.

On 14 May, Reading and the EFL confirmed that Redwood Holdings Limited had completed its takeover of the club.

In March 2025, 12 months late, Reading finally submitted financial accounts for the 2022–23 relegation campaign, revealing a loss of over £20m. The late filing of accounts resulted in an EFL transfer embargo, which could be reinstated if Reading failed to publish their 2023–24 accounts by 31 March. Accounts revealing a further loss of £12.1m were filed in May 2025 and the transfer embargo was lifted.

== Crest and colours ==
Reading F.C. crest (1987–96)

A change from 1965 to 1969 saw Reading wear sky blue.

The Reading Coat of Arms was used as the crest of the club on early match day programs. It is recognised as the first crest of the club. The first crest to appear on a Reading kit was in 1953, it featured just the letter "R". There was no crest seen again until 1981 when there was a crest featuring three elm trees and the rivers Thames and Kennet; this only lasted two seasons. From 1987 to 1996 the crest used the new kit colours of yellow, sky blue, royal blue and white. A brief return to a design based on the 1981 crest was reintroduced for the 1996–97 and 1997–98 seasons. Commenting on the need for a new crest to coincide with the move to the Madejski Stadium, as well as moving into the new millennium, Sir John Madejski said: "I know some traditionalists will say we should keep the old badge but they should bear in mind the need to move forward." The current crest was first seen on the kits for the 1998–99 season. It is based on the club colours—blue and white—and includes a crown to represent the Royal County of Berkshire and the Maiwand Lion to represent Reading.

The club's home kit for the 2022–23 season saw University of Reading's Ed Hawkins' stripe design included on the sleeves with the stripes representing the average temperature for a single year since Reading's foundation to raise awareness for climate change, the shirt itself being made of recycled plastic bottles.

== Stadium ==
The club played at Reading Recreation Ground until 1878, before moving on to Reading Cricket Ground (1878–1882), Coley Park (1882–1889) and Caversham Cricket Ground (1889–1896).

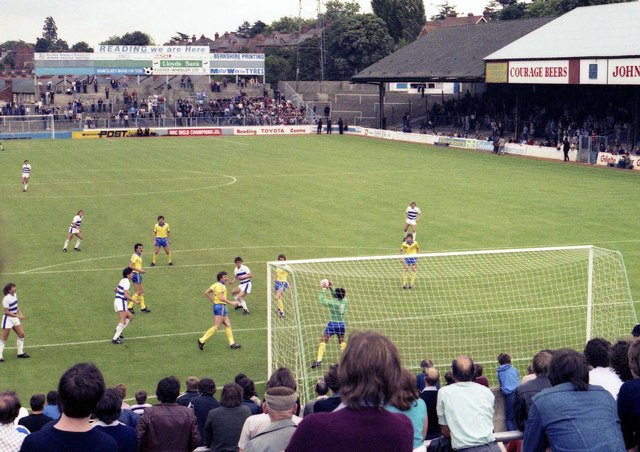
Elm Park was Reading's stadium for 102 years, pictured here in 1981.

In 1889, Reading were unable to continue playing at Coley Park as W B Monck (the local squire) no longer allowed football due to "rowdyism [by] the rougher elements". With club membership exceeding 300 by the time the club went professional in 1895, Reading required a proper ground. A meeting the following year determined that funding would be difficult. £20 was donated by J C Fidler, on the proviso that "no liquors were to be sold" on site. The rest of the cost was financed through donations by wealthy supporters, as well as one large individual donation. A former gravel pit in West Reading was identified as the site. The first game at Elm Park was held on 5 September 1896 between Reading and A Roston Bourke's XI. The visitors were a scratch team from Holloway College. £44 was taken on the gate, with an attendance of approximately 2,500.

In 1908, the club's annual general meeting proposed moving to a new ground near Reading railway station. A board meeting the following year decided that the move would not be possible, as "there was no chance of a move to the ground near to the GWR railway stations due to the actions of the Great Western Railway".

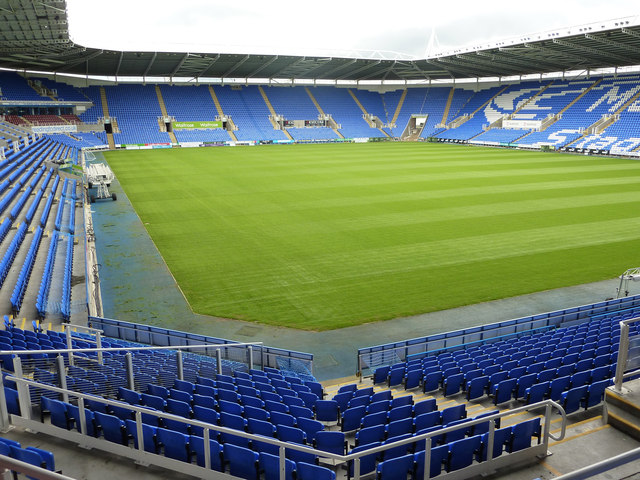
The Madejski Stadium has been Reading's home ground since 1998.

In 1994, the Taylor Report made an all-seater stadium compulsory in the top two divisions (the Premier League and the first division). Reading were champions of the second division in 1994, and were promoted to the first division. Reading became subject to the Taylor requirements, though converting Elm Park to an all-seater stadium would have been impractical. Instead, a location in Smallmead (to the south of the town) was identified as the site for a new stadium. The former council landfill site was bought for £1, with further conditions that the development of the stadium would include part-funding of the A33 relief road. Expansion of the club's home would also allow alternative commercial ventures (particularly leisure facilities) and shared use with other teams (such as rugby union clubs Richmond and London Irish). The last competitive match at Elm Park took place on 3 May 1998 against Norwich City, with Reading losing 1–0. Reading began the 1998–99 season at the Madejski Stadium. It was opened on 22 August 1998 when Luton Town were beaten 3–0. The stadium cost more than £50 million to build. For the first time in its history, Reading Football Club participated in the Premier League in the 2006–07 season. As a result of the sell-out crowds for their first few fixtures of the season, the club announced their intention, in October 2006, to make a planning application to extend the ground to between 37,000 and 38,000 seats. The application was made on 24 January 2007, proposing initially the extension of the East Stand with a further 6,000 seats (raising capacity to around 30,000) and subsequently extension of the North and South Stands to reach the full proposed capacity. On 24 May 2007, it was announced that planning permission had been granted to extend the stadium to a capacity of 36,900.

On 5 July 2016, at the end of Eamonn Dolan's funeral, Reading announced that the North Stand would be renamed the Eamonn Dolan Stand.

During the 2019–20 season Reading moved to a new training ground at Bearwood Golf Club to replace Hogwood Park, their previous training facility. In March 2024, owner Dai Yongge agreed to sell the Bearwood Park training ground to Wycombe Wanderers, claiming it was necessary to fund the club's short-term future while trying to sell the club.

In July 2021, at the beginning of the club's 150th anniversary season, it was announced that the Madejski Stadium had been rebranded as the Select Car Leasing Stadium for the next ten years, under a sponsorship deal. In honour of Sir John Madejski, the East Stand was renamed the Sir John Madejski Stand.

== Support ==
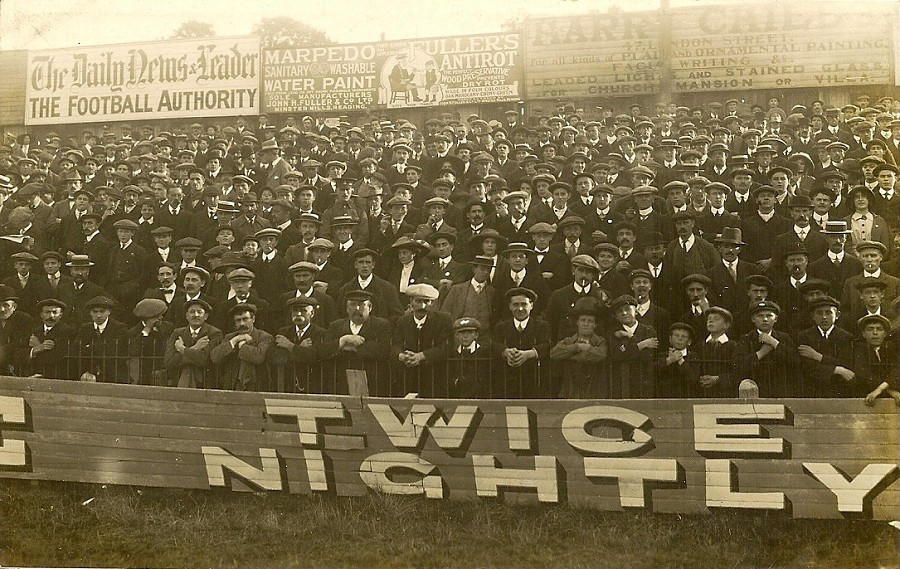
Supporters at a Reading match at Elm Park in 1913

In 1930, the Reading Football Supporters’ Club (RFSC) was formed to represent the interests of supporters of the club and to assist in raising funds for the football club. On 18 March 2002, the Supporters' Trust at Reading become the official successor to the RFSC.

In 2001, Reading became the first football club to register their fans as an official member of their squad, giving the "player" registered with squad number 13 as 'Reading Fans'.

For the 2015–16 season, Reading had 12,983 season ticket holders – ranked 10th in the Championship and almost identical to former league champions Leeds United. The figure for that season was greater than the 12,552 recorded in the previous season, but down from the 2013–14 Championship peak of 14,547. The average attendance for the 2015–16 season was 17,570 – the 10th highest in the Championship.

=== Rivalries ===
Before going out of business in 1992, Aldershot were Reading's biggest rivals. Aldershot were, geographically, the closest Football League club to Reading. There was a strong rift between the two sets of fans, with fighting between fans occurring on several occasions. Strong feelings remain between fans of Reading and fans of Aldershot Town, the refounded club in Aldershot. Aldershot Town were promoted into the Football League in 2008, but the clubs haven't met in a competitive match since the demise of the original club. Aldershot were relegated out of the league in 2013, having entered administration, reducing the chances of a competitive meeting between the two sides in the near future.

Since Aldershot's exile, Reading's main local rivalries have been with Oxford United and Swindon Town. When the three teams had shared a division, their rivalry was referred to as the "Didcot Triangle". However, the rivalry between Oxford and Swindon is stronger than between either of the two and Reading, largely due to them both spending their recent history in lower divisions than Reading, and spending their previous history in higher divisions than Reading. In 2012, a small survey showed that Reading's main rivals were Aldershot Town, followed by Swindon Town and Oxford United.

== Sponsorship ==
Period	Kit manufacturer	Shirt sponsor (front)	Shirt sponsor (back)	Shorts sponsor	Sleeve sponsor
1976–77	Umbro	—			
1977–81	Bukta	—			
1981–82	—	—			
1982–83	—	Reading Chronicle			
1983–84	Umbro	Radio 210			
1984–89	Patrick	Courage			
1989–90	Matchwinner	Courage			
1990–92	Matchwinner	HAT Painting			
1992–93	Brooks	Auto Trader			
1993–96	Pelada	Auto Trader			
1996–99	Mizuno	Auto Trader			
1999–2001	Mizuno	Westcoast			
2001–04	Kit@	Westcoast			
2004–05	Puma	Westcoast			
2005–08	Puma	Kyocera			
2008–15	Puma	Waitrose	Marussia F1	Legend	
2015–16	Puma	Carabao Daeng (home); Thai Airways (away)	Euro Cake		
2016–19	Puma	Carabao Daeng			
2019–21	Macron	Casumo			
2021–2026	Macron	Select Car Leasing	Village Hotel Club / Rapidz	CRL Fire & Flood Damage / RSSL	Barracuda Networks
2026–	Macron	Mr Vegas	Select Car Leasing		

== Ownership and finances ==
As of May 2025, The Reading Football Club Limited, incorporated on 11 August 1897, was:

- 100% owned by Redwood Holdings 1 Ltd

== Players ==
As of 13 November 2026

=== First-team squad ===
Note: Flags indicate national team as defined under FIFA eligibility rules; some limited exceptions apply. Players may hold more than one non-FIFA nationality.

No.	Pos.	Nation	Player
1	GK	POR	Joel Pereira (vice-captain)
2	DF	ENG	Udoka Godwin-Malife
3	DF	MSR	Jeriel Dorsett
4	MF	ZIM	Andy Rinomhota
5	DF	ENG	Haydon Roberts
6	MF	CAN	Liam Fraser
7	FW	ENG	Jack Marriott
8	MF	WAL	Charlie Savage
9	FW	NIR	Jamie Reid
10	MF	ENG	Lewis Wing (captain)
11	MF	GER	Daniel Kyerewaa
14	MF	ENG	Randell Williams
15	DF	IRL	Paudie O'Connor

No.	Pos.	Nation	Player
16	DF	ENG	Benn Ward
17	MF	ENG	George Earthy
18	FW	SCO	Jacob Brown
19	FW	ENG	Kyreece Lisbie
20	DF	ENG	Josh Knight (on loan from Portsmouth)
22	FW	IRL	Sean Patton
23	DF	IRL	Conor Masterson
25	GK	ENG	Jack Stevens
28	MF	ENG	Josh Stokes (on loan from Bristol City)
32	MF	NIR	Paddy Lane
39	DF	ENG	Ashqar Ahmed
42	DF	ENG	Boyd Beacroft
48	GK	ENG	Matthew Rowley

=== Out on loan ===
Note: Flags indicate national team as defined under FIFA eligibility rules; some limited exceptions apply. Players may hold more than one non-FIFA nationality.

No.	Pos.	Nation	Player
12	DF	GHA	Kelvin Abrefa (on loan at Forest Green Rovers until 4 December 2026)
31	GK	ENG	Tom Norcott (on loan at Derry City until 31 December 2026)
49	MF	ENG	Emmanuel Osho (on loan at AFC Totton until 13 January 2027)

=== Under 21s and academy ===
The Reading Academy refers to the development teams of Reading Football Club. The club takes part in the Professional Development League system, with the Under-21s competing in the Premier League 2 – Division 2, and the Under-18s competing in the U18 Premier League – South Division.

== Club officials and management ==
Board of directors and senior club staff
Role	Person
Chairman	(United States) Rob Couhig
Director	(United States) Todd Trosclair
Director	(United States) Alec Lundberg
Director	(Israel) Ross Kestin
Director	(United States) Rick Catania
Managing director	(England) Neil Peters
Club secretary	(England) Sue Hewett
Chief executive officer	(Wales) Joe Jacobson
Financial controller	(United States) Crispin Boyce
Director of recruitment	(Republic of Ireland) Brian Carey

Coaching Staff
Role	Person
Manager	(England) Leam Richardson
Assistant manager	(England) John Coleman
First team coach	(Antigua and Barbuda) Mikele Leigertwood
First team coach	(England) James Beattie
First team coach	(England) Danny Schofield
Goalkeeping coach	(England) Robert Shay
Head physiotherapist	(England) Matt Hirons
Head of physical performance	(England) Mat Bramhall
Head of sports science	(England) Lewis Keeble
First team analyst	(England) Alex Forsey
Kit manager	(England) Roberto Fung

Academy management
Role	Person
Academy manager	(Barbados) Michael Gilkes
Head of academy operations	(England) Celeste Stevens
Head of academy sports science & medicine	(England) Steve Cottrell

== Records and statistics ==
=== Records ===
- Highest league finish: 8th in Premier League, 2006–07
- Best FA Cup performance: Semi-finals, 1926–27, 2014–15
- Best League Cup performance: Quarter-finals, 1995–96, 1997–98
- Biggest win: 9–0 v. Exeter City (19 September 2023, EFL Trophy 1st round).
- Heaviest defeat: 18–0 v. Preston North End (27 January 1894, FA Cup 1st round)
- Longest winning sequence at the start of a season: 13 victories in 1985–86.
- Longest winless sequence at the start of a season (club record): 6 (2 draws and 4 defeats), (2018–19)
- Fastest goal in a competitive game (club record), 55th fastest in association football: 9.55 seconds (Yakou Méïté; 2020–21)
- Fastest goal in FA Cup history: 9 seconds (Jimmy Kébé; 2009–10)

=== Notable players ===
In 1999, Reading commissioned a poll of the supporters' 'Player of the Millennium' to determine the club's best ever player.

Dates	Name
Pos.	Player
1	(England) Robin Friday
2	(England) Trevor Senior
3	(England) Steve Death
3	(Trinidad and Tobago) Shaka Hislop
5	(England) Phil Parkinson
6	(England) Alf Messer
7	(Northern Ireland) Jimmy Quinn
8	(England) Michael Gilkes
9	(England) Ronnie Blackman
10	(England) Martin Hicks

=== Appearances ===
- Most appearances: Martin Hicks (603; 1978–1991)
- Most league appearances: Martin Hicks (500; 1978–1991)

The following players have played more than 398 times for Reading, in all competitions.

Pos.	Player	App.
1	(England) Martin Hicks	603
2	(England) Steve Death	537
3	(England) Dick Spiers	505
4	(England) Michael Gilkes	487
5	(England) Stuart Beavon	481
6	(England) Maurice Evans	459
7	(England) Steve Richardson	457
8	(England) Jimmy Wheeler	453
9	(England) Phil Parkinson	426
10	(Wales) Ady Williams	398

=== Goalscorers ===
- Most goals: Trevor Senior (191; 1983–1987, 1988–1992)
- Most goals in a season: Trevor Senior (41; 1983–84)
- Most league goals: Ronnie Blackman (158; 1947–1954)
- Most league goals in a season: Ronnie Blackman (39; 1951–52)
- Most league goals in a game: Arthur Bacon (6 vs. Stoke City; 1930–31)
- Most penalties: Ray Reeves (21)

The following players have scored more than 85 times for Reading, in all competitions.

Pos.	Player	Goals
1	(England) Trevor Senior	191
2	(England) Jimmy Wheeler	168
3	(England) Ronnie Blackman	167
4	(England) Tony MacPhee	104
5	(England) Tommy Tait	103
6	(England) Denis Allen	95
7	(Northern Ireland) Jimmy Quinn	94
8	(England) Douggie Webb	93
9	(England) Les Chappell	90
10	(England) Pat Earles	85

=== Goalkeeping ===
- Longest time without conceding a goal: Steve Death (1,103 minutes; 1978–79; former English league record)

=== Other records ===

The regular starting line-up of the 2005/06 Coca-Cola Championship winning team, who finished the season with a record 106 points.

Reading hold the record for the number of successive league wins at the start of a season, with a total of 13 wins at the start of the 1985–86 Third Division campaign and also the record for the number of points gained in a professional league season with 106 points in the 2005–06 Football League Championship campaign. Reading finished champions of their division on both of these occasions.

The club's largest win was a 10–2 victory over Crystal Palace on 4 September 1946 in the Football League Third Division South. Reading's heaviest loss was an 18–0 defeat against Preston North End in the FA Cup 1st round on 27 January 1894. Reading have lost the two highest-scoring matches in the history of the Premier League; Portsmouth 7–4 Reading on 29 September 2007, and Tottenham Hotspur 6–4 Reading on 29 December 2007, as well as losing the highest-scoring League Cup game, Reading 5–7 Arsenal on 30 October 2012.

The player with the most league appearances is Martin Hicks, with 500 from 1978 to 1991. The most capped player to play for Reading is Chris Gunter, who has currently won 62 caps for Wales since being a Reading player since July 2012. The most league goals in total and in a season are held by Ronnie Blackman with 158 from 1947 to 1954 and 39 in 1951–52 respectively. The player with the most league goals in a game is Arthur Bacon with six against Stoke City in 1930–31. The first Reading-based player to play in the FIFA World Cup was Bobby Convey in 2006 with the United States. The record time for a goalkeeper not conceding a goal is held by Steve Death at 1,103 minutes in 1978–79, which is a former English league record in itself.

Reading's highest attendance at Elm Park was in 1927, when 33,042 spectators watched Reading defeat Brentford 1–0. The highest attendance at the Madejski Stadium is 24,184 for the Premier League game with Everton on 17 November 2012.

The highest transfer fee received for a Reading player is the £6.6 million 1899 Hoffenheim paid for Gylfi Sigurðsson on 31 August 2010.

Gylfi Sigurðsson and Samúel Friðjónsson became the first players from the Reading academy to feature in a World Cup squad by being named by Iceland for the 2018 FIFA World Cup. Gylfi Sigurðsson went on to become the first academy graduate to score at the World Cup in Iceland's 2–1 defeat to Croatia on 26 June 2018, after becoming the first academy graduate to play in the World Cup with his appearance against Argentina on 16 June 2018.

=== Captains (21st century) ===
Dates	Name
2000–2003	(England) Phil Parkinson
2003–2009	(Scotland) Graeme Murty
2009–2011	(Iceland) Ívar Ingimarsson
2011–2014	(Jamaica) Jobi McAnuff
2014–2015	(Turkey) Jem Karacan
2015–2019	(Republic of Ireland) Paul McShane
2019–2022	(Jamaica) Liam Moore
2022–2025	(Ghana) Andy Yiadom
2025–	(England) Lewis Wing

== Honours ==
League

- Second Division / Championship (level 2)
  - Champions: 2005–06, 2011–12
- Third Division South / Third Division / Second Division (level 3)
  - Champions: 1925–26, 1985–86, 1993–94
  - Runners-up: 2001–02
- Fourth Division (level 4)
  - Champions: 1978–79
  - Promoted: 1975–76, 1983–84

Cup

- Full Members' Cup
  - Winners: 1987–88
- London War Cup
  - Winners: 1941
- Third Division South Cup
  - Winners: 1938

== Women's team ==
In May 2006, Reading launched the Reading FC Women's team. They used to play in the FA Premier League Southern Division. From 2014, Reading FC Women played in the FA Women's Super League 2 until they won promotion to the FA Women's Super League 1 in 2015 after winning the league. In the 2017–18 season, they finished fourth in the Women's Super League – their highest league position to date. The team currently plays at the Madjeski Stadium. It was announced Reading FC Women would switch to operating on a part-time basis ahead of the 2023–24 season. On 30 June 2024, Reading FC Women withdrew from the Women's Championship due to financial difficulties, dropping to Tier 5 of the women's football pyramid.

== Bibliography ==
- Digby, Bob (2001). It's a World Thing. Oxford, Oxfordshire: Oxford University Press. ISBN 978-0-19-913428-1. Archived from the original on 25 April 2021.
- Yeo, Stephen (1976). Religion and Voluntary Organisations in Crisis. Abingdon, Oxfordshire: Taylor & Francis. ISBN 978-0-85664-017-9. Archived from the original on 23 September 2021.
