= John Madejski =

English businessman (born 1941)

Sir John Madejski OBE DL
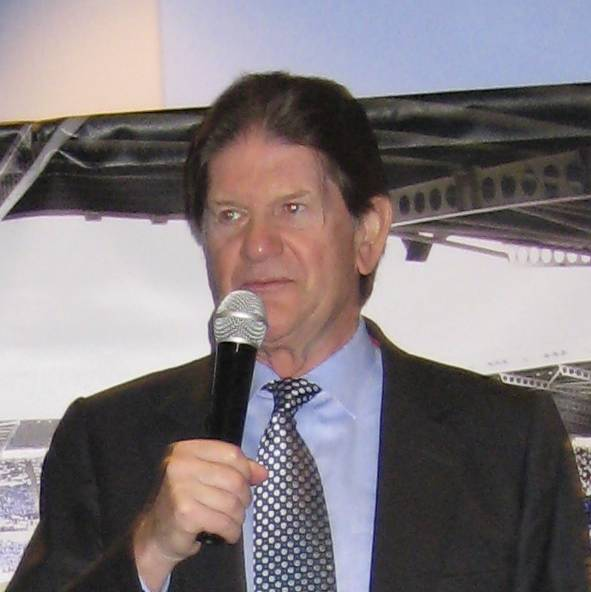
- John Madejski c 2007
- Born: Robert John Hurst; 28 April 1941 (age 85); Stoke-on-Trent, England
- Occupations: Company director, football club chairman

Sir John Robert Madejski (/məˈdeɪski/; born Robert John Hurst; 28 April 1941) is an English businessman, with commercial interests spanning property, broadcast media, hotels, restaurants, publishing and football.

Madejski is the founder of the magazine which became Auto Trader and was chairman of Reading F.C., Chancellor of the University of Reading and a Deputy Lieutenant of Berkshire. He is a benefactor to many institutions, especially in academia, education and the arts. In the Sunday Times Rich List 2009 ranking of the wealthiest people in the UK he was placed 222nd with an estimated fortune of £250 million.

== Personal life ==
Madejski was born Robert John Hurst on 28 April 1941, in Stoke-on-Trent, as a result of a wartime fling, being initially placed with a foster family. While still a baby, Hurst was moved back to his mother's home town of Reading and placed in a children's home. His mother later married a Second World War Polish airman, Zygmunt Madejski, with Hurst eventually coming to live with them and adopting his stepfather's surname. Hurst's biological father had started another family.

Madejski has two daughters, but has never married. He made front-page headlines in UK tabloid newspapers in October 2004 due to his alleged romantic attachment with singer and TV star Cilla Black. The pair became friends due to their mutual affiliation with the Conservative Party.

He owns a large number of luxury cars, including two Rolls-Royces, two Bentleys, four Jaguars, an AC Cobra and two Ferraris, including a red 328 which is kept in a glass case at his home.

== Career ==
While on holiday in the US in the mid-1970s, Madejski saw a car sales magazine that included pictures of the vehicles on sale. He immediately realised the potential of the idea and with the help of his business partners Paul Gibbons and Peter Taylor founded Thames Valley Trader in 1976. Initially the magazine advertised a range of items, from houses to cars and aircraft, but it soon concentrated on vehicles and was renamed Auto Trader. Madejski partnered with the Guardian Media Group in 1982 to give the title national exposure.

By 1998, 52 titles were being published with a combined circulation of more than 700,000. In 1998, he sold his company Hurst Publishing for £174 million.

=== Reading F.C. ===
Madejski became chairman of the Football League club Reading F.C. in 1990. And built the club's Madejski Stadium, with £25 million largely contributed by him. When the stadium was built, it had a capacity of 24,161. He rescued Reading from receivership. He said "When Robert Maxwell was alive I offered him five pounds a share. When he fell off his boat I got them for 10p. Funny old life isn't it?". In 2006, he led the club to the top tier of English football for the first time in its 135-year history and proposed to expand the stadium to 38,000 seats ,after winning the Championship by a record breaking 106 points.

On 21 January 2012 it was announced that Madejski planned to relinquish control of the club by selling a 51% stake for £40 million to Thames Sports Investments, a Russian consortium headed by Anton Zingarevich. Madejski announced that as part of the deal he would continue as chairman for at least another two years, followed by becoming honorary life president. Madejski's ownership of the club ended on 29 May 2012 when the takeover deal was completed.

== Charitable activities ==
In 1990, Madejski donated £500,000 to the trustees of the Falkland Islands Memorial Chapel Trust. The donation was crucial to the fund-raising effort and enabled the trustees to build the War Memorial Chapel, dedicated to the 255 fallen of the Falkland Islands War: it is situated in the grounds of Pangbourne College and was opened by the Queen in 2000.

He is also a benefactor to the Royal Academy of Arts in Piccadilly, London and in 2004 had the John Madejski Fine Rooms at Burlington House named after him in recognition of a contribution of £3 million to the institution. A sculpture by Edgar Degas, La Petite Danseuse de Quatorze Ans, that he purchased at Sotheby's in 2004 was on display in the John Madejski Fine Rooms; it was sold in February 2009 for £13.3 million.

Madjeski founded Madjeski Academy in 2006, and built new buildings in 2010. In 2017, he said building the academy was his finest achievement.

The John Madejski Centre for Reputation at Henley Management College, the new garden at the Victoria and Albert Museum, a lecture theatre at the University of Reading and a gallery at the Museum of Reading also bear his name. The John Madejski Academy (formerly Thamesbridge College) last achieved a "good" Ofsted inspection outcome in 2008. It was found to be "inadequate" in its most recent full inspection in October 2023. In January 2025 the academy was transferred from the White Horse Federation to Greenshaw Learning Trust.

== Political activities ==
In the early 2000s, Madejski was active in politics: he contributed extensively to the Conservative Party. Madejski and Dave Whelan called for football clubs to observe a minute's silence to mark the death of Margaret Thatcher.

== Honours ==
- In 2000, Madejski was appointed Officer of the Order of the British Empire (OBE) in the 2000 Birthday Honours "for services to Reading Football Club and the community in Reading, Berkshire." He is also Deputy Lord Lieutenant of Berkshire.
- In 2006, he was admitted as a Freeman of the Borough "in recognition of the distinguished service rendered to the Borough of Reading, by his contribution to the growth and success of football in Reading, and by his support for education and arts".
- On 14 December 2007, Madejski was awarded the Honorary Degree of Doctor of Letters University of Reading and formally installed as the seventh chancellor of the university, succeeding to the post on the retirement of Lord Carrington. He was succeeded as Chancellor in December 2016 by Lord Waldegrave.
- Madejski was knighted in the 2009 New Year Honours for charitable services.

Academic offices
Preceded by The Lord Carrington	Chancellor of the University of Reading; 2007–2016	Succeeded by William Waldegrave, Baron Waldegrave of North Hill
