= 2003 Columbus Crew season =

Columbus Crew
2003 season
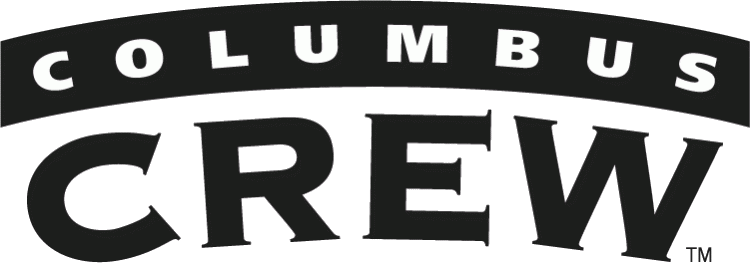
- Investor-operators: Lamar Hunt; Clark Hunt; Dan Hunt; Lamar Hunt Jr. Sharron Hunt Munson; Ron Pizzuti and a group of local investors
- Head Coach: Greg Andrulis
- Stadium: Columbus Crew Stadium
- Major League Soccer: Conference: 5th Overall: 8th
- MLS Cup playoffs: Did not qualify
- U.S. Open Cup: Fourth round
- CONCACAF Champions' Cup: Quarterfinals
- Top goalscorer: League: Brian McBride (12); All: Edson Buddle (16)
- Highest home attendance: 22,058 (4/5 v. LA)
- Lowest home attendance: 3,358 (4/16 v. MON)
- Average home league attendance: 16,250 (72%)
- Biggest win: CLB 6–2 CHI (6/2)
- Biggest defeat: MON 6-0 CLB (4/9)
Home colors	Away colors

The 2003 Columbus Crew season was the club's eighth season of existence and their eighth consecutive season in Major League Soccer, the top flight of soccer in the United States. The first match of the season was on April 5 against Los Angeles Galaxy. It was the third season under head coach Greg Andrulis.

This was also the final season for longtime Crew icons Mike Clark, who retired as the club's all-time appearance leader (now second), and Brian McBride, who went to play in the Premier League at Everton and Fulham.

== Roster ==
As of October 18, 2003

Note: Flags indicate national team as defined under FIFA eligibility rules; some limited exceptions apply. Players may hold more than one non-FIFA nationality.

No.	Pos.	Nation	Player
1	GK	USA	Jon Busch
2	DF	USA	Frankie Hejduk
3	DF	USA	Mike Clark (captain)
4	DF	NIR	Mark Williams
5	DF	USA	Chad McCarty
6	DF	USA	Eric Denton
7	MF	BRA	Diego Walsh
8	DF	NZL	Duncan Oughton
10	MF	USA	Brian Maisonneuve
11	FW	USA	Jeff Cunningham
12	FW	USA	Edson Buddle
15	MF	GUA	Freddy Garcia

No.	Pos.	Nation	Player
16	MF	USA	Ross Paule
17	FW	USA	Brian West
18	DF	USA	Nelson Akwari
20	FW	USA	Brian McBride
21	MF	USA	Kyle Martino
22	GK	USA	Tom Presthus
23	DF	HON	Alex Pineda Chacon
24	MF	USA	Jeff Matteo
25	MF	USA	Michael Ritch
27	MF	ECU	Andres Murriagui
28	DF	USA	Jake Traeger
31	GK	USA	Michael Ueltschey

== Technical staff ==
Position	Staff
President/General Manager	(United States) Jim Smith
Head Coach	(United States) Greg Andrulis
Assistant Coach	(United States) Jim Launder
Assistant Coach	(Poland) Robert Warzycha
Head Trainer	(United States) Craig Devine
Team Manager	(United States) Tucker Walther

== Non-competitive ==
=== Preseason ===
For the preseason match against Cincinnati Riverhawks, the Crew brought in non-roster invitees Shane Curran, Gary Berry and Bret Jones from the Columbus Shooting Stars. The Crew spent a portion of preseason in Portugal where they played a series of friendlies against local teams. They brought in Michael Thomas as a non-roster invitee on this trip. After returning from Portugal, the Crew went to Florida to continue training. They played another series of friendly matches. Omar Belbey joined the team as a non-roster invitee on this leg of preseason.

February 12 Friendly	Columbus Crew	9-0	Cincinnati Riverhawks	Mason, OH
	Gonzalez 18', 41'; Buddle 25', 57'; Martino 37'; Walsh 68' (pen.); Curran 83'; Berry 88'; Jones 89'	Report		Stadium: Wall2Wall Soccer Facility

February 18 Friendly	C.D. Fátima	1-1	Columbus Crew	Fátima, Portugal
	35'	Report	Martino 9'

February 20 Friendly	Sporting CP	2-1	Columbus Crew	Lisbon, Portugal
	Prates 43'; Niculae 53'	Report	Cunningham 16'	Stadium: Lisbon Training Center; Attendance: 400

February 23 Friendly	S.C. Lourinhanense	0-1	Columbus Crew	Lourinhã, Portugal
		Report	Cunningham

February 26 Friendly	U.D. Leiria	2-1	Columbus Crew	Leiria, Portugal
	Goal	Report	Goal

March 4 Friendly	San Jose Earthquakes	2-1	Columbus Crew	Fort Lauderdale, FL
7:00 PM EST	Lagos 36'; Wegerle 66'; Corrales (yellow card) 79'	Report	Walsh 6'; Clark (yellow card) 29'; McCarty (yellow card) 83'	Stadium: Lockhart Stadium

March 6 Friendly	Columbus Crew	1-1	U.S. U-23 National Team	Fort Lauderdale, FL
	Dante Washington	Report	Goal

March 6 Friendly	Columbus Crew	7-1	Lynn Fighting Knights	Fort Lauderdale, FL
	Goal	Report	Goal

March 8 Copa Carnaval	Columbus Crew	4-2	D.C. United	Miami, FL
5:00 PM EST	McCarty (yellow card) 5'; Clark 19'; Buddle 33', 45'; Cunningham 42'	Report	Ivanov (yellow card) 18' (yellow-red card) 27'; Etcheverry 56', 74' (pen.); Stewart (yellow card) 60'	Stadium: Miami Orange Bowl

March 10 Friendly	NY/NJ MetroStars	2-2	Columbus Crew	Boca Raton, FL
2:00 PM EST	Pope 35'; Droze 90'	Report	Matteo 1'; García 61'	Stadium: Lynn University

March 25 Friendly	Columbus Crew	4-0	Dayton Flyers	Obetz, OH
4:00 PM EST	Traeger; Maisonneuve; Washington; West			Stadium: Crew Training Center

March 29 Friendly	Kansas City Wizards	1-2	Columbus Crew	Edmond, OK
8:00 PM EST	Walsh 10'; Washington 83'; Maisonneuve (yellow card) 90+1'	Report	Fabbro (yellow card) 9'; Preki (yellow card) 14'; Wolff 51'	Stadium: Wantland Stadium; Attendance: 9,223; Referee: Terry Vaughn; Assistant referees: Paul Scott; Brent Hall

April 1 Keith Evans Memorial Match	Columbus Crew	5-0	Cincinnati Riverhawks	Obetz, OH
7:00 PM EST	Paule,, McBride; Cunningham			Stadium: Crew Training Center

=== Midseason ===
The Crew played a midseason friendly against Santos Laguna in Kansas City as a double header with Kansas City Wizards vs. Dallas Burn which was the first time all three Clark owned MLS teams played in the same stadium on the same day. The Crew who came into the game with many injuries called up Taly Goode, Kevin Friedland, and Taylor Graham from Kansas City Wizards.

April 23 Connor Senn Memorial Match	Ohio State Buckeyes	1-3	Columbus Crew	Columbus, OH
	Nugent 6'	Report	Cunningham 30'; West 59'; Oughton 69'	Stadium: Jesse Owens Memorial Stadium; Attendance: 439

July 12 Friendly	Santos Laguna	0-1	Columbus Crew	Kansas City, MO
5:15 PM EDT			West 41'	Stadium: Arrowhead Stadium

== Competitive ==
=== Overview ===
Competition	First match	Last match	Starting round	Final position	Record							
Competition	First match	Last match	Starting round	Final position	Pld	W	D	L	GF	GA	GD	Win %
Major League Soccer	April 5, 2003	October 26, 2003	Matchday 1	8th	30	10	8	12	44	44	+0	33.33
U.S. Open Cup	August 6, 2003	August 6, 2003	Fourth Round	Fourth Round	1	0	0	1	3	4	−1	0.00
CONCACAF Champions' Cup	March 16, 2003	April 16, 2003	Round of 16	Quarterfinals	4	2	0	2	6	7	−1	50.00
Total					35	12	8	15	53	55	−2	34.29

Source: Competitions

=== MLS ===
==== Standings ====
===== Eastern Conference =====
Pos	Team	Pld	W	L	T	GF	GA	GD	Pts	Qualification
1	Chicago Fire	30	15	7	8	53	43	+10	53	MLS Cup Playoffs
2	New England Revolution	30	12	9	9	55	47	+8	45	MLS Cup Playoffs
3	MetroStars	30	11	10	9	40	40	0	42	MLS Cup Playoffs
4	D.C. United	30	10	11	9	38	36	+2	39	MLS Cup Playoffs
5	Columbus Crew	30	10	12	8	44	44	0	38	

Source: MLS

===== Overall table =====
Pos	Team	Pld	W	L	T	GF	GA	GD	Pts
6	Colorado Rapids	30	11	12	7	40	45	−5	40
7	D.C. United	30	10	11	9	38	36	+2	39
8	Columbus Crew	30	10	12	8	44	44	0	38
9	Los Angeles Galaxy	30	9	12	9	35	35	0	36
10	Dallas Burn	30	6	19	5	35	64	−29	23

Source: MLS
Rules for classification: 1) points; 2) head-to-head record; 3) goal difference; 4) number of goals scored

==== Results summary ====
Overall								Home						Away					
Pld	Pts	W	L	T	GF	GA	GD	W	L	T	GF	GA	GD	W	L	T	GF	GA	GD
30	38	10	12	8	44	44	0	6	3	6	24	15	+9	4	9	2	20	29	−9

Source: MLS standings
Pld = Matches played; Pts = Points; W = Matches won; T = Matches tied; L = Matches lost; GF = Goals for; GA = Goals against; GD = Goal difference

==== Results by round ====
Round	1	2	3	4	5	6	7	8	9	10	11	12	13	14	15	16	17	18	19	20	21	22	23	24	25	26	27	28	29	30
Stadium	H	A	A	H	A	H	A	H	H	H	A	A	H	H	H	H	A	A	H	A	A	H	A	H	A	A	H	A	A	H
Result	T	W	W	L	T	W	L	L	T	W	L	L	W	T	L	T	L	L	T	L	W	W	T	W	L	L	T	L	W	W

Source: schedule
A = Away; H = Home; W = Win; L = Loss; T = Tie

==== Match results ====
April 5 1	Columbus Crew	1-1 (a.e.t.)	Los Angeles Galaxy	Columbus, OH
4:00 PM EST	Buddle 35'; Oughton (yellow card) 94'	Report	Myung-bo (yellow card) 37'; Ruíz 63'; Marshall (yellow card) 75'	Stadium: Columbus Crew Stadium; Attendance: 22,058; Referee: Kevin Terry; Assistant referees: Craig Lowry; Richard Eddy; Fourth official: Ricardo Salazar

April 12 2	NY/NJ MetroStars	0-1	Columbus Crew	East Rutherford, NJ
7:30 PM EDT	Maisonneuve (yellow card) 18'; Cunningham 90'	Report	Clark (yellow card) 81'	Stadium: Giants Stadium; Attendance: 23,786; Referee: Ricardo Salazar; Assistant referees: Rob Fereday; Steven Davidson; Fourth official: Steve Karaduzovic

April 19 3	New England Revolution	1-2	Columbus Crew	Foxborough, MA
4:00 PM EDT	Kanté (yellow card) 64'; Franchino (yellow card) 81'; Ralston 86'	Report	Denton 12'; McBride 53'	Stadium: Gillette Stadium; Attendance: 15,827; Referee: Brian Hall; Assistant referees: Greg Barkey; Thomas Supple; Fourth official: Erich Simmons

April 26 4	Columbus Crew	0-1	NY/NJ MetroStars	Columbus, OH
4:00 PM EDT	Maisonneuve (yellow card) 31'	Report	Williams (yellow card) 10'; Magee 59'	Stadium: Columbus Crew Stadium; Attendance: 12,165; Referee: Michael Kennedy; Assistant referees: Richard Eddy; Bahij Salman; Fourth official: Elias Bazakos

May 3 5	Kansas City Wizards	2-2 (a.e.t.)	Columbus Crew	Kansas City, MO
8:00 PM EDT	Zavagnin (yellow card) 14'; Preki 45+2' (pen.); Armstrong (yellow card) 69'; Quill 89'; Fabbro (yellow card) 94'	Report	Oughton (yellow card) 42'; Paule (yellow card) 47'; McBride 49', (yellow card) 90'; Martino 55'; Busch (yellow card) 58'; Cunningham (yellow card) 60'	Stadium: Arrowhead Stadium; Attendance: 16,006; Referee: Marcel Yonan; Assistant referees: Steven Davidson; Jose Andrade; Fourth official: Bronson Broockerd

May 10 6	Columbus Crew	2-0	Colorado Rapids	Columbus, OH
7:30 PM EDT	Cunningham 25' (pen.); McBride 43'; Maisonneuve (yellow card) 74'	Report	Mastroeni (yellow card) 56'; Hart (yellow card) 60'; Herdsman (yellow card) 85'	Stadium: Columbus Crew Stadium; Attendance: 16,555; Referee: Abbey Okulaja; Assistant referees: Rob Fereday; Steven Davidson; Fourth official: Ricardo Salazar

May 17 7	San Jose Earthquakes	4-3	Columbus Crew	San Jose, CA
10:00 PM EDT	Mulrooney (yellow card) 10'; Mullan 30'; Ching 49'; Agoos 67'; Donovan 87'	Report	McBride 38' (pen.); Cunningham 61'; Clark (yellow card) 69'; Paule 90'	Stadium: Spartan Stadium; Attendance: 7,180; Referee: Ali Saheli; Assistant referees: Emiliano Monje; Gibby Widner; Fourth official: Cory Dean

May 24 8	Columbus Crew	2-3	New England Revolution	Columbus, OH
7:30 PM EDT	Paule 40'; Dunseth 76'	Report	Kamler 36', 70'; Twellman 89'	Stadium: Columbus Crew Stadium; Attendance: 13,186; Referee: Kevin Stott; Assistant referees: Greg Barkey; David Bragg; Fourth official: Hilario Grajeda

May 31 9	Columbus Crew	1-1 (a.e.t.)	NY/NJ MetroStars	Columbus, OH
7:30 PM EDT	Cunningham 34'; McBride (yellow card) 84'; Busch (yellow card) 90'; McCarty (yellow card) 97'	Report	Lisi (yellow card) 13'; Mathis 64' (pen.); Jolley (yellow card) 65'	Stadium: Columbus Crew Stadium; Attendance: 12,518; Referee: Jair Marrufo; Assistant referees: Francisco Sanchez; Bill Dittmar; Fourth official: Mikael Lundqvist

June 7 10	Columbus Crew	1-0	San Jose Earthquakes	Columbus, OH
7:30 PM EDT	Walsh (yellow card) 53' (yellow-red card) 78'; McBride 85'	Report	Mullan (yellow card) 14'	Stadium: Columbus Crew Stadium; Attendance: 16,481; Referee: Gus St. Silva; Assistant referees: Thomas Supple; Chip Reed; Fourth official: Hilario Grajeda

June 14 11	D.C. United	3-0	Columbus Crew	Washington, D.C.
7:30 PM EDT	Petke (yellow card) 27', (goal) 43'; Eskandarian 79', 85'	Report	Torres (yellow card) 21'	Stadium: Robert F. Kennedy Memorial Stadium; Attendance: 13,907; Referee: Terry Vaughn; Assistant referees: George Gansner; Bill Dittmar; Fourth official: David Simon

June 21 12	San Jose Earthquakes	2-1	Columbus Crew	San Jose, CA
10:00 PM EDT	Mullan 43'; Lagos (red card) 57'; Ekelund (yellow card) 59'; Walker 77'	Report	Dunseth (yellow card) 27'; McBride 55'; Clark (red card) 57'; Paule (yellow card) 66'	Stadium: Spartan Stadium; Attendance: 8,058; Referee: Marcel Yonan; Assistant referees: David Bragg; Dinesh Singh; Fourth official: Yader Reyes

June 28 13	Columbus Crew	3-0	D.C. United	Columbus, OH
7:30 PM EDT	West 8'; Dunseth (yellow card) 18'; McBride 25'; Walsh 60'; Hejduk (yellow card) 62'	Report	Convey (yellow card) 37'	Stadium: Columbus Crew Stadium; Attendance: 16,489; Referee: Alex Prus; Assistant referees: Craig Lowry; Paul Scott; Fourth official: Hilario Grajeda

July 5 14	Columbus Crew	0-0 (a.e.t.)	Dallas Burn	Columbus, OH
7:30 PM EDT	West (yellow card) 50'	Report		Stadium: Columbus Crew Stadium; Attendance: 14,412; Referee: Ricardo Salazar; Assistant referees: Rob Fereday; Thomas Supple; Fourth official: Abbey Okulaja

July 19 15	Columbus Crew	0-1	Kansas City Wizards	Columbus, OH
7:30 PM EDT	Clark (yellow card) 46'; Dunseth (yellow card) 62'; Denton (yellow card) 68'; McCarty (yellow card) 90'	Report	Zavagnin (yellow card) 38'; Simutenkov 58'	Stadium: Columbus Crew Stadium; Attendance: 16,472; Referee: Michael Kennedy; Assistant referees: Greg Watson; Hilario Grajeda; Fourth official: Elias Bazakos

July 23 16	Columbus Crew	1-1 (a.e.t.)	New England Revolution	Columbus, OH
7:30 PM EDT	Matteo 33'	Report	Joseph (yellow card) 35'; Noonan 55'; Llamosa (yellow card) 77'	Stadium: Columbus Crew Stadium; Attendance: 14,632; Referee: Brian Hall; Assistant referees: George Vergara; Jose Corro; Fourth official: Ricardo Salazar

July 30 17	Los Angeles Galaxy	2-1	Columbus Crew	Carson, CA
10:30 PM EDT	Ruiz (yellow card) 11'; Martínez 44'; Lalas 52'	Report	Hejduk (yellow card) 11'; Dunseth (yellow card) 20'; Oughton (yellow card) 45+2'; Clark (yellow card) 57'; Maisonneuve 79'	Stadium: The Home Depot Center; Attendance: 21,806; Referee: Noel Kenny; Assistant referees: Nate Clement; Richard Eddy; Fourth official: Hector Tobon
Note: Originally scheduled on September 3

August 9 18	Los Angeles Galaxy	3-1	Columbus Crew	Carson, CA
10:00 PM EDT	Ruiz 68', 86'; Serna 89'	Report	Clark (yellow card) 22'; Dunseth (yellow card) 28'; McCarty (yellow card) 44'; Hejduk (yellow card) 45+1'; Buddle 74'	Stadium: The Home Depot Center; Attendance: 22,063; Referee: Alex Prus; Assistant referees: Kermit Quisenberry; Francisco Sanchez; Fourth official: Ramon Hernandez

August 13 19	Columbus Crew	2-2 (a.e.t.)	Chicago Fire	Columbus, OH
7:30 PM EDT	Denton (yellow card) 37'; Buddle 47'; West 52'; Busch (yellow card) 68'; Cunningham (yellow card) 74'; McCarty (yellow card) 80'	Report	Razov 34' (pen.); Ralph 90'; Bocanegra (yellow card) 98' (yellow-red card) 100+1'	Stadium: Columbus Crew Stadium; Attendance: 17,193; Referee: Brian Hall; Assistant referees: Fabio Tovar; Bahij Salman; Fourth official: Hilario Grajeda

August 16 20	Colorado Rapids	2-1 (a.e.t.)	Columbus Crew	Denver, CO
9:00 PM EDT	Spencer 57', (yellow card) 65'; Chung 91'	Report	McCarty (yellow card) 9'; Buddle 72'; Denton (yellow card) 78'; Oughton (yellow card) 89'	Stadium: Invesco Field at Mile High; Attendance: 11,671; Referee: Jesse Johnson; Assistant referees: Greg Barkey; David Bragg; Fourth official: Kevin Stott

August 23 21	Dallas Burn	1-2	Columbus Crew	Southlake, TX
9:00 PM EDT	Deering (yellow card) 9' (yellow-red card) 28'; Gbandi (yellow card) 31'; Rhine 75'	Report	Denton (yellow card) 35'; Hejduk (yellow card) 37'; Buddle 43'; Paule 62'	Stadium: Dragon Stadium; Attendance: 7,950; Referee: Kevin Stott; Assistant referees: George Vergara; Jose Andrade; Fourth official: Hector Tobon

August 31 22	Columbus Crew	1-0	Kansas City Wizards	Columbus, OH
7:30 PM EDT	West 37'; Oughton (yellow card) 55'	Report	Quill (yellow card) 4'	Stadium: Columbus Crew Stadium; Attendance: 18,147; Referee: Terry Vaughn; Assistant referees: Jorge De La Bandera; Chip Reed; Fourth official: Mikael Lundqvist
Note: Originally scheduled on August 30

September 6 23	Chicago Fire	1-1 (a.e.t.)	Columbus Crew	Naperville, IL
9:00 PM EDT	Marsch (yellow card) 52'; Bocanegra 66'; Curtin (yellow card) 94'	Report	Buddle 37', (yellow card) 53'; Oughton (yellow card) 49'; West (yellow card) 89'	Stadium: Cardinal Stadium; Attendance: 15,136; Referee: Gus St. Silva; Assistant referees: Richard Eddy; Bill Dittmar; Fourth official: Cien Asoera
Note: Originally scheduled on September 7

September 13 24	Columbus Crew	3-2	Dallas Burn	Columbus, OH
7:30 PM EDT	Buddle 28', 81'; McBride 39'	Report	Dunseth 15'; Stone (yellow card) 49' (yellow-red card) 86'; Johnson 52'; Pareja (yellow card) 90+2'	Stadium: Columbus Crew Stadium; Attendance: 16,049; Referee: Alex Prus; Assistant referees: Kermit Quisenberry; Gibby Widner; Fourth official: Hilario Grajeda

September 20 25	NY/NJ MetroStars	1-0 (a.e.t.)	Columbus Crew	East Rutherford, NJ
7:30 PM EDT	Lisi (yellow card) 32'; Williams (yellow card) 33'; Wolyniec 100+1'	Report	Williams (yellow card) 5'; Oughton (yellow card) 70'	Stadium: Giants Stadium; Attendance: 16,507; Referee: Noel Kenny; Assistant referees: Rob Fereday; Thomas Supple; Fourth official: Ricardo Salazar

September 28 26	New England Revolution	3-2 (a.e.t.)	Columbus Crew	Foxborough, MA
6:00 PM EDT	Llamosa (yellow card) 50'; Joseph (yellow card) 65', (goal) 81'; Moore 78'; Franchino 97'	Report	Williams (yellow card) 22'; Hejduk (yellow card) 27'; McBride (yellow card) 30'; Martino 41', (yellow card) 67'; Denton 72', (yellow card) 80'; Matteo (yellow card) 96'	Stadium: Gillette Stadium; Attendance: 8,594; Referee: Terry Vaughn; Assistant referees: George Vergara; Jorge De La Bandera; Fourth official: Gus St. Silva
Note: Originally scheduled on September 27

October 4 27	Columbus Crew	1-1 (a.e.t.)	D.C. United	Columbus, OH
7:30 PM EDT	Paule 19'; Denton (yellow card) 36'; Maisonneuve (yellow card) 39'; Williams (yellow card) 72'	Report	Nelsen (yellow card) 44'; Stewart (yellow card) 51'; Etcheverry 59' (pen.), (yellow card) 61'	Stadium: Columbus Crew Stadium; Attendance: 17,995; Referee: Ricardo Valenzuela; Assistant referees: Nate Clement; George Gansner; Fourth official: Marcel Yonan

October 10 28	Chicago Fire	2-0	Columbus Crew	Chicago, IL
9:00 PM EDT	Jaqua 11', (yellow card) 67'; Razov 49'; Beasley (yellow card) 57'	Report	Hejduk (yellow card) 54'; Akwari (yellow card) 88'; Clark (yellow card) 89'	Stadium: Soldier Field; Attendance: 30,845; Referee: Brian Hall; Assistant referees: Chris Strickland; Jose Corro; Fourth official: Michael Kennedy
Note: Originally scheduled on October 11

October 19 29	D.C. United	2-3 (a.e.t.)	Columbus Crew	Washington, D.C.
4:00 PM EDT	Stoichkov (yellow card) 22', (goal) 37' (pen.); Martins (yellow card) 72'; Kovalenko (yellow card) 73'; Petke 90+6'; Eskandarian (yellow card) 92' (yellow-red card) 93'	Report	Denton (yellow card) 20'; West 26'; Maisonneuve (yellow card) 38'; Williams (yellow card) 44'; McBride 90' (pen.), 100'; Walsh (yellow card) 98'	Stadium: Robert F. Kennedy Memorial Stadium; Attendance: 14,368; Referee: Abbey Okulaja; Assistant referees: Thomas Supple; Gibby Widner; Fourth official: Erich Simmons

October 26 30	Columbus Crew	6-2	Chicago Fire	Columbus, OH
4:00 PM EST	Williams (yellow card) 45+1'; McBride 49', 67'; Cunningham 54'; Buddle 74' 85'; García 90'	Report	Selolwane 3'; Marsch 25' (pen.)	Stadium: Columbus Crew Stadium; Attendance: 19,404; Referee: Kevin Stott; Assistant referees: Chip Reed; Bahij Salman; Fourth official: Marcel Yonan

=== MLS Cup Playoffs ===
The Columbus Crew failed to qualify for the playoffs in this season.

=== U.S. Open Cup ===
August 6 Fourth Round	Columbus Crew (MLS) (Ohio)	3-4	(New Jersey) NY/NJ MetroStars (MLS)	Columbus, OH
7:30 PM EDT	Buddle 10', 11', (yellow card) 73'; Denton (yellow card) 21'; Maisonneuve 43'; West (red card) 68'	Report	Maisonneuve 24' (o.g.); Jolley 54'; Lisi (yellow card) 70'; Pope 77', 86'	Stadium: Columbus Crew Stadium; Attendance: 5,590; Referee: Kevin Stott; Assistant referees: Hilario Grajeda; Mikael Lundqvist; Fourth official: Jason Krnac

=== CONCACAF Champions' Cup ===
==== Round of 16 ====
March 16 Leg 1	C.D. Árabe Unido (Panama)	1-2	(United States) Columbus Crew	Colon, Panama
2:00 PM EST	7'; 65'	Report	Busch (yellow card) 6'; Cunningham (red card) 56'; Martino 63'	Stadium: Estadio Armando Dely Valdés; Attendance: 3,500; Referee: Neftali Recinos (El Salvador)

March 23 Leg 2	Columbus Crew (United States)	3-0 (3-2 agg.)	(Panama) C.D. Árabe Unido	Columbus, OH
4:00 PM EST	Hejduk (yellow card) 37' (yellow-red card) 71'; Buddle 42', 59'; Martino (yellow card) 55', (goal) 70'	Report	(yellow card) 20'; (yellow card) 29'; (yellow card) 59'; (yellow card) 62'	Stadium: Columbus Crew Stadium; Attendance: 6,443; Referee: Jorge Casso (Mexico); Assistant referees: Craig Lowry (United States); Nathan Clement (United States); Fourth official: Michael Kennedy (United States)

==== Quarterfinals ====
April 9 Leg 1	Monarcas Morelia (Mexico)	6-0	(United States) Columbus Crew	Morelia, Mexico
9:00 PM EDT	Palacios 38'; Íñiguez 42', 69'; Bautista 49', 54'; (yellow card) 48'; Navia 65'	Report	Clark (yellow card) 11'; McCarty (yellow card) 82'	Stadium: Estadio Morelos; Attendance: 10,000; Referee: Joel Aguilar (El Salvador)

April 16 Leg 2	Columbus Crew (United States)	2-0 (2-6 agg.)	(Mexico) Monarcas Morelia	Columbus, OH
7:00 PM EDT	Denton (yellow card) 13' (yellow-red card) 31'; Buddle 15'; Cunningham 28', (yellow card) 43'; Hejduk (yellow card) 62'; Oughton (yellow card) 78'; Walsh (yellow card) 88'	Report	(yellow card) 27'; (yellow card) 64'; (yellow card) 86'	Stadium: Columbus Crew Stadium; Attendance: 3,358; Referee: Jean-Francois Corrivault (Canada); Assistant referees: George Vargara (United States); Robert Fereday (United States); Fourth official: Ali Saheli (United States)

== Statistics ==
=== Appearances and goals ===
Under "Apps" for each section, the first number represents the number of starts, and the second number represents appearances as a substitute.

No.	Pos	Nat	Player	Total		MLS		U.S. Open Cup		CONCACAF Champions' Cup	
No.	Pos	Nat	Player	Apps	Goals	Apps	Goals	Apps	Goals	Apps	Goals
1	GK	(United States) USA	Jon Busch	27	0	24+0	0	0+0	0	3+0	0
2	DF	(United States) USA	Frankie Hejduk	27	0	23+0	0	1+0	0	3+0	0
3	DF	(United States) USA	Mike Clark	33	0	29+0	0	1+0	0	3+0	0
4	DF	(Northern Ireland) NIR	Mark Williams	5	0	5+0	0	0+0	0	0+0	0
5	DF	(United States) USA	Chad McCarty	23	0	14+5	0	0+0	0	3+1	0
6	DF	(United States) USA	Eric Denton	30	2	25+1	2	1+0	0	3+0	0
7	MF	(Brazil) BRA	Diego Walsh	17	1	6+8	1	1+0	0	1+1	0
8	DF	(New Zealand) NZL	Duncan Oughton	27	0	18+5	0	1+0	0	2+1	0
10	MF	(United States) USA	Brian Maisonneuve	28	2	20+3	1	1+0	1	2+2	0
11	FW	(United States) USA	Jeff Cunningham	25	6	13+8	5	1+0	0	2+1	1
12	FW	(United States) USA	Edson Buddle	26	16	16+5	10	1+0	2	4+0	4
15	MF	(Guatemala) GUA	Freddy Garcia	26	1	12+10	1	0+0	0	4+0	0
16	MF	(United States) USA	Ross Paule	30	4	25+0	4	0+1	0	2+2	0
17	FW	(United States) USA	Brian West	28	4	17+7	4	0+1	0	2+1	0
18	DF	(United States) USA	Nelson Akwari	14	0	5+6	0	0+1	0	2+0	0
20	FW	(United States) USA	Brian McBride	27	12	23+1	12	0+0	0	2+1	0
21	MF	(United States) USA	Kyle Martino	24	3	20+2	2	0+0	0	2+0	1
22	GK	(United States) USA	Tom Presthus	9	0	6+1	0	1+0	0	1+0	0
23	FW	(Honduras) HON	Alex Pineda Chacon	9	0	3+5	0	0+1	0	0+0	0
24	MF	(United States) USA	Jeff Matteo	7	1	3+3	1	1+0	0	0+0	0
25	FW	(United States) USA	Michael Ritch	3	0	0+3	0	0+0	0	0+0	0
27	MF	(Ecuador) ECU	Andres Murriagui	0	0	0+0	0	0+0	0	0+0	0
28	DF	(United States) USA	Jake Traeger	2	0	0+1	0	0+0	0	0+1	0
31	GK	(United States) USA	Michael Ueltschey	0	0	0+0	0	0+0	0	0+0	0
			Own goal	0	0	-	0	-	0	-	0
Players who left Columbus during the season:
4	DF	(Costa Rica) CRC	Daniel Torres	9	0	6+2	0	0+0	0	1+0	0
13	DF	(United States) USA	Brian Dunseth	22	1	17+2	1	1+0	0	2+0	0
26	MF	(United States) USA	Trevor Perea	1	0	0+1	0	0+0	0	0+0	0
-	MF	(United States) USA	Ryan Mack	0	0	0+0	0	0+0	0	0+0	0
-	GK	(United States) USA	Clint Baumstark	0	0	0+0	0	0+0	0	0+0	0

=== Disciplinary record ===
No.	Pos.	Name	MLS		U.S. Open Cup		CONCACAF Champions' Cup		Total	
No.	Pos.	Name	Booked	Sent off (straight red)	Booked	Sent off (straight red)	Booked	Sent off (straight red)	Booked	Sent off (straight red)
1	GK	(United States) Jon Busch	3	0	0	0	1	0	4	0
2	DF	(United States) Frankie Hejduk	6	0	0	0	3	1	9	1
3	DF	(United States) Mike Clark	5	1	0	0	1	0	6	1
4	DF	(Northern Ireland) Mark Williams	5	0	0	0	0	0	5	0
5	DF	(United States) Chad McCarty	5	0	0	0	1	0	6	0
6	DF	(United States) Eric Denton	7	0	1	0	2	1	10	1
7	MF	(Brazil) Diego Walsh	2	1	0	0	1	0	3	1
8	DF	(New Zealand) Duncan Oughton	6	0	0	0	1	0	7	0
10	MF	(United States) Brian Maisonneuve	5	0	0	0	0	0	5	0
11	FW	(United States) Jeff Cunningham	2	0	0	0	1	1	3	1
12	FW	(United States) Edson Buddle	2	0	1	0	0	0	3	0
15	MF	(Guatemala) Freddy Garcia	0	0	0	0	0	0	0	0
16	MF	(United States) Ross Paule	2	0	0	0	0	0	2	0
17	FW	(United States) Brian West	2	0	0	1	0	0	2	1
18	DF	(United States) Nelson Akwari	1	0	0	0	0	0	1	0
20	FW	(United States) Brian McBride	3	0	0	0	0	0	3	0
21	MF	(United States) Kyle Martino	1	0	0	0	1	0	2	0
22	GK	(United States) Tom Presthus	0	0	0	0	0	0	0	0
23	FW	(Honduras) Alex Pineda Chacon	0	0	0	0	0	0	0	0
24	MF	(United States) Jeff Matteo	1	0	0	0	0	0	1	0
25	FW	(United States) Michael Ritch	0	0	0	0	0	0	0	0
27	MF	(United States) Andres Murriagui	0	0	0	0	0	0	0	0
28	DF	(United States) Jake Traeger	0	0	0	0	0	0	0	0
31	GK	(United States) Michael Ueltschey	0	0	0	0	0	0	0	0
Players who left Columbus during the season:
4	DF	(Costa Rica) Daniel Torres	1	0	0	0	0	0	1	0
13	DF	(United States) Brian Dunseth	6	0	0	0	0	0	6	0
26	MF	(United States) Trevor Perea	0	0	0	0	0	0	0	0
-	MF	(United States) Ryan Mack	0	0	0	0	0	0	0	0
-	GK	(United States) Clint Baumstark	0	0	0	0	0	0	0	0

=== Clean sheets ===
No.	Name	MLS	U.S. Open Cup	CONCACAF Champions' Cup	Total	Games Played
1	(United States) Jon Busch	4	0	0	0	27
22	(United States) Tom Presthus	2	0	1	0	9
31	(United States) Michael Ueltschey	0	0	0	0	0
Players who left Columbus during the season:
-	(United States) Clint Baumstark	0	0	0	0	0

== Transfers ==
=== In ===
Pos.	Player	Transferred from	Fee/notes	Date	Source
DF	(Brazil) Diego Walsh	(United States) SMU Mustangs	Drafted in round 1 of the 2003 MLS SuperDraft	January 17, 2003	
DF	(United States) Nelson Akwari	(United States) NY/NJ MetroStars	Traded for a second round draft pick in the 2003 MLS SuperDraft	January 17, 2003	
FW	(United States) Michael Ritch	(United States) Auburn Tigers	Drafted in round 4 of the 2003 MLS SuperDraft	January 17, 2003	
DF	(United States) Jake Traeger	(United States) Ohio State Buckeyes	Drafted in round 6 of the 2003 MLS SuperDraft	January 17, 2003	
DF	(United States) Frankie Hejduk	(Germany) Bayer Leverkusen		March 8, 2003	
MF	(United States) Ross Paule	(United States) NY/NJ MetroStars	Traded for Chris Leitch and Jeff Matteo	March 13, 2003	
MF	(United States) Trevor Perea	(United States) Duke Blue Devils	Signed to a developmental contract	March, 2003	
GK	(United States) Michael Ueltschey	(United States) Cincinnati Riverhawks	Signed to a developmental contract	March, 2003	
MF	(United States) Ryan Mack	(United States) Chicago Fire	Signed to a developmental contract	April, 2003	
MF	(United States) Jeff Matteo	(United States) NY/NJ MetroStars	Claimed off waivers	May 23, 2003	
MF	(Honduras) Alex Pineda Chacon	(United States) Los Angeles Galaxy	Traded for a third round draft pick in the 2004 MLS SuperDraft	July 31, 2003	
DF	(Northern Ireland) Mark Williams	(England) Stoke City F.C.	Signed via discovery	August 21, 2003	
MF	(Ecuador) Andres Murriagui	(United States) Cincinnati Riverhawks	Signed to a developmental contract	August 23, 2003	

=== Loan in ===
Pos.	Player	Parent club	Length/Notes	Beginning	End	Source
GK	(United States) Clint Baumstark	(United States) MLS Pool	Short term agreement	July 30, 2003	July 30, 2003	

=== Out ===
Pos.	Player	Transferred to	Fee/notes	Date	Source
DF	(United States) Chris Leitch	(United States) NY/NJ MetroStars	Traded with Jeff Matteo for Ross Paule	March 13, 2003	
MF	(United States) Jeff Matteo	(United States) NY/NJ MetroStars	Traded with Chris Leitch for Ross Paule	March 13, 2003	
FW	(United States) Dante Washington	(United States) Virginia Beach Mariners	Contract expired	March 23, 2003	
MF	(United States) Ryan Mack	(United States) Syracuse Salty Dogs	Placed on waivers	May 23, 2003	
DF	(Costa Rica) Daniel Torres	(Costa Rica) Deportivo Saprissa	Transfer, terms undisclosed	July 2, 2003	
MF	(United States) Trevor Perea	(United States) Cincinnati Riverhawks	Placed on waivers	August 20, 2003	
DF	(United States) Brian Dunseth	(United States) Dallas Burn	Traded for a fifth round draft pick in the 2004 MLS SuperDraft	August 21, 2003	
DF	(United States) Chad McCarty	Retired	Placed on waivers	December 31, 2003	
MF	(United States) Jeff Matteo	(United States) Minnesota Thunder	Contract expired	December 31, 2003	
DF	(Northern Ireland) Mark Williams	(England) Wimbledon F.C.	Contract expired	December 31, 2003	
MF	(Honduras) Alex Pineda Chacon	(United States) Atlanta Silverbacks	Contract expired	December 31, 2003	
MF	(United States) Brian West	(Norway) Fredrikstad FK	Contract expired	December 31, 2003	
GK	(United States) Michael Ueltschey	Puerto Rico Islanders	Contract expired	December 31, 2003	
MF	(Ecuador) Andres Murriagui	(United States) Atlanta Silverbacks	Contract expired	December 31, 2003	

=== Loans out ===
Pos.	Player	Loanee club	Length/Notes	Beginning	End	Source
FW	(United States) Brian McBride	(England) Everton F.C.		January 10, 2003	March 21, 2003	
MF	(United States) Trevor Perea	(United States) Cincinnati Riverhawks	Multiple short term agreements	April, 2003	August 20, 2003	
DF	(United States) Nelson Akwari	(United States) Cincinnati Riverhawks	Multiple short term agreements	April, 2003	End of Season	
DF	(United States) Jake Traeger	(United States) Cincinnati Riverhawks	Multiple short term agreements	April, 2003	End of Season	
FW	(United States) Michael Ritch	(United States) Syracuse Salty Dogs	Multiple short term agreements	April, 2003	End of Season	
GK	(United States) Michael Ueltschey	(Canada) Montreal Impact	Multiple short term agreements	April 16, 2003	End of Season	
MF	(United States) Andres Murriagui	(United States) Cincinnati Riverhawks	Multiple short term agreements	August, 2003	End of Season	

=== MLS Draft picks ===
Draft picks are not automatically signed to the team roster. Only those who are signed to a contract will be listed as transfers in. The picks for the Columbus Crew are listed below:

2003 Columbus Crew SuperDraft Picks
Round	Pick	Player	Position	College
1	7	(Brazil) Diego Walsh	DF	SMU
4	37	(United States) Michael Ritch	FW	Auburn
5	47	(United States) Guy Abrahamson	MF	Rutgers
6	58	(United States) Jake Traeger	DF	Ohio State

2003 Columbus Crew Supplemental Draft Picks
Round	Pick	Player	Position	Team
1	7	(Scotland) Ian Joy	DF	Kidderminster Harriers F.C.

== Awards ==
=== MLS Player of the Week ===
Week	Player	Opponent(s)	Link
1	(United States) Edson Buddle	Los Angeles Galaxy	
3	(United States) Brian McBride	New England Revolution	

=== 2003 MLS All-Star Game ===
Starters

- DF Frankie Hejduk

Reserves

- MF Kyle Martino

=== Postseason ===
MLS Fair Play Award

- FW Brian McBride

=== Crew Team Awards ===
- Most Valuable Player – Ross Paule
- Defensive Player of the Year – Eric Denton
- Scoring Champion – Brian McBride
- Man of the Year – Brian McBride
- Coach's Award – Brian Maisonneuve
- Goal of the Year – Brian McBride & Diego Walsh
- Humanitarian of the Year – Mike Clark
- Hardest Working Man of the Year – Frankie Hejduk
- Comeback Player of the Year – Edson Buddle
