= 2009 San Jose Earthquakes season =

San Jose Earthquakes
2009 season
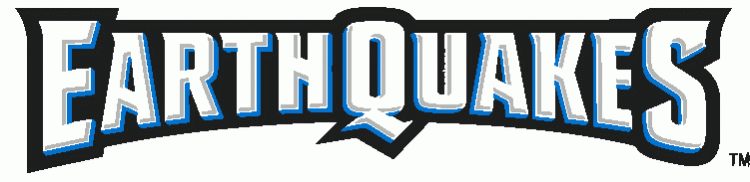
- Owner: Earthquakes Soccer, LLC
- Coach: Frank Yallop
- Stadium: Buck Shaw Stadium
- Major League Soccer: Conference: 8th Overall: 14th
- MLS Cup: Did not qualify
- U.S. Open Cup: Did not qualify
- California Clásico: 2nd
- Heritage Cup: 1st
- Top goalscorer: Ryan Johnson (11)
- Average home league attendance: 14,114
Home colors	Away colors

The 2009 San Jose Earthquakes season was the twelfth season of the team's existence, and the second since its revival. The season began with a 1-0 home loss to the New England Revolution on March 21, and ended with a 2-0 loss at the Los Angeles Galaxy on October 24.

== Squad ==
=== Current squad ===
As of August 18, 2009. Note: Flags indicate national team as defined under FIFA eligibility rules; some limited exceptions apply. Players may hold more than one non-FIFA nationality.

No.	Pos.	Nation	Player
1	GK	USA	Joe Cannon
4	DF	USA	Chris Leitch
5	DF	BRA	Fábio da Silva
6	FW	ENG	Darren Huckerby
7	MF	NZL	Simon Elliott
8	MF	CAN	António Ribeiro
10	MF	SLV	Arturo Alvarez
11	MF	USA	Bobby Convey
12	MF	USA	Ramiro Corrales (captain)
13	FW	TRI	Cornell Glen
14	MF	USA	Brandon McDonald
15	MF	USA	Shea Salinas

No.	Pos.	Nation	Player
17	FW	USA	Chris Wondolowski
18	DF	USA	Jamil Roberts
19	FW	JAM	Ryan Johnson
20	MF	SLV	Ramón Sánchez
21	DF	USA	Jason Hernandez (vice-captain)
23	DF	USA	Mike Zaher
24	GK	USA	Andrew Weber
25	FW	USA	Quincy Amarikwa
27	DF	USA	Aaron Pitchkolan
28	MF	BRA	André Luiz Moreira
31	GK	USA	Mike Graczyk

== Club ==
=== Management ===
Position	Staff
General Manager	(United States) John Doyle
Head Coach	(Canada) Frank Yallop
Assistant Coach	(United States) Ian Russell
Goalkeeper Coach	(New Zealand) Jason Batty
Head trainer	(United States) Bruce Morgan
Equipment manager	(El Salvador) Jose Vega
Team Manager	(Italy) Daniele Cosmi

Last updated: April 18, 2009
Source: San Jose Earthquakes

=== Other information ===
Owner	(United States) Earthquakes Soccer, LLC
Ground (capacity and dimensions)	Buck Shaw Stadium (10,300 / 71x110 yards)

Source: San Jose Earthquakes

=== Kits ===
Home	Home Alternate	Away

Type	Shirt	Shorts	Socks	First appearance / Info
Home	Black	Black	Black	
Home Alt.	Black	Black	White	MLS, October 10 against Toronto, second half
Away	White	Blue	White	

== Competitions ==
=== Overall ===
Competition	Started round	Current position / round	Final position / round	First match	Last match
MLS	—	—		March 21, 2009	

Updated to match played April 15, 2008
Source: Competitions

==== Results summary ====
Overall								Home						Away					
Pld	Pts	W	L	T	GF	GA	GD	W	L	T	GF	GA	GD	W	L	T	GF	GA	GD
30	30	7	14	9	36	50	−14	6	5	4	22	21	+1	1	9	5	14	29	−15

Last updated: October 25, 2009
Source: Major League Soccer
Pld = Matches played; Pts = Points; W = Matches won; T = Matches tied; L = Matches lost; GF = Goals for; GA = Goals against; GD = Goal difference

Round	1	2	3	4	5	6	7	8	9	10	11	12	13	14	15	16	17	18	19	20	21	22	23	24	25	26	27	28	29	30
Stadium	H	H	A	H	H	A	H	A	A	A	H	A	A	H	A	H	A	H	H	H	H	A	H	A	A	H	H	A	A	A
Result	L	W	L	T	T	L	L	L	L	L	W	T	L	W	T	L	L	T	W	L	W	L	T	T	W	W	L	T	T	L

Updated to match(es) played on October 25, 2009. Source: San Jose Earthquakes
A = Away; H = Home; W = Win; L = Loss; T = Tie

== Matches ==
Win Tie Loss

=== MLS ===
March 21, 2009	San Jose Earthquakes	0–1	New England Revolution	Santa Clara, California
	Amarikwa (yellow card) 74'; Denton (yellow card) 79'	Report	Dube 55'	Stadium: Buck Shaw Stadium; Attendance: 10,335; Referee: Ricardo Salazar

March 28, 2009	San Jose Earthquakes	3–2	Houston Dynamo	Santa Clara, California, United States
	Johnson 30'; Alvarez 33'; Weaver 44'; Corrales (yellow card) 66'	Report	Cameron (yellow card) 23'; Wondolowski 34'; Davis 36'; Boswell (yellow card) 70'; Clark (yellow card) 93+'	Stadium: Buck Shaw Stadium; Attendance: 9,177; Referee: Kevin Stott

April 5, 2009	Kansas City Wizards	2–0	San Jose Earthquakes	Kansas City, Kansas
	Hohlbein 28'; López 78'; Gomez (yellow card) 92+'	Report	Huckerby (yellow card) 30'; Alvarez (yellow card) 34'	Stadium: CommunityAmerica Ballpark; Attendance: 6,922; Referee: Edvin Jurisevic

April 11, 2009	San Jose Earthquakes	3–3	Chicago Fire	Santa Clara, California
	Leitch (yellow card) 7'; Johnson 14'; Convey 43'; Alvarez 75'; Corrales (yellow card) 78'; Salinas (yellow card) 73' (yellow-red card) 81'	Report	Pappa 41'; Segares (yellow card) 55'; McBride 57'; Robinson (yellow card) 73'; Rolfe 85'	Stadium: Buck Shaw Stadium; Attendance: 9,717; Referee: Jorge Gonzalez

April 18, 2009	San Jose Earthquakes	1–1	Los Angeles Galaxy	Oakland, California
	Campos 5'; Corrales (yellow card) 67'; Garcia (yellow card) 90'; Amarikwa (yellow card) 92+'	Report	Kovalenko (yellow card) 25'; Miglioranzi (yellow card) 73'; Jordan 76'	Stadium: Oakland–Alameda County Coliseum; Attendance: 15,463; Referee: Alex Prus

April 25, 2009	Seattle Sounders FC	2–0	San Jose Earthquakes	Seattle, Washington
	Alonso (yellow card) 30'; Zakuani 42'; Evans 50'	Report	Convey (yellow card) 4'; Garcia (yellow card) 41'	Stadium: Qwest Field; Attendance: 28,838; Referee: Kevin Stott

May 2, 2009	San Jose Earthquakes	0–1	Chivas USA	Santa Clara, California
		Report	Stepanovic (yellow card) 37'; Braun 53'; Marsch (yellow card) 86'; Kljestan (yellow card) 92+'	Stadium: Buck Shaw Stadium; Attendance: 10,049; Referee: Alex Prus

May 8, 2009	New York Red Bulls	4–1	San Jose Earthquakes	East Rutherford, New Jersey
	Rojas 7' 13'; Angel 22'; Kandji 40'	Report	Weaver (yellow card) 37'; Johnson 45'; Pitchkolan (yellow card) 59'; Denton (yellow card) 63'; Amarikwa (yellow card) 88'	Stadium: Giants Stadium; Attendance: 8,042; Referee: Jeff Gontarek

May 23, 2009	Houston Dynamo	3–1	San Jose Earthquakes	Houston, Texas, United States
	Ching 4'; Kamara 12'; Waibel (yellow card) 46'; Waibel 50'; Cameron (yellow card) 59'	Report	Johnson (yellow card) 14'; Johnson 53'	Stadium: Robertson Stadium; Attendance: 12,619; Referee: Alex Prus

May 27, 2009	Columbus Crew	2–1	San Jose Earthquakes	Columbus, Ohio
	Gaven 29'; Schelotto 46'	Report	Amarikwa (yellow card) 13'; Johnson 23'; Convey (yellow card) 36'; Corrales (yellow card) 63'	Stadium: Columbus Crew Stadium; Attendance: 8,793; Referee: Abiodun Okulaja

May 30, 2009	San Jose Earthquakes	2–1	Real Salt Lake	Santa Clara, California
	Glen 52'; Johnson (yellow card) 57'; Alvarez 63'; Alvarez (yellow card) 63'; Corrales (yellow card) 69'	Report	Beckerman (yellow card) 28'; Johnson (yellow card) 48'; Morales (yellow card) 70'; Findley 80'	Stadium: Buck Shaw Stadium; Attendance: 10,153; Referee: Kevin Stott

June 7, 2009	FC Dallas	2–2	San Jose Earthquakes	Frisco, Texas
	Saragosa (yellow card) 16'; Ferreira 29'; Moor (yellow card) 70'; Cooper 87'	Report	Campos (yellow card) 25'; Ricchetti 60' (o.g.); Alvarez 82'	Stadium: Pizza Hut Park; Attendance: 5,724; Referee: Tim Weyland

June 13, 2009	Seattle Sounders FC	2–1	San Jose Earthquakes	Seattle, Washington
19:30 PST	Ljungberg 42'; Evans (yellow card) 43'; Montero 59'; Montero (yellow card) 74'; Ljungberg (yellow card) 94+'	Report	Pitchkolan (yellow card) 16'; Corrales (yellow card) 34'; Ribeiro (yellow card) 50'; Huckerby 68'; Wondolowski (yellow card) 92+'	Stadium: Qwest Field; Attendance: 28,999; Referee: Silviu Petrescu

June 20, 2009	San Jose Earthquakes	2–1	Los Angeles Galaxy	Oakland, California
	Campos 6' (pen.); Pitchkolan (yellow card) 24'; Johnson (yellow card) 48'; Johnson 54'; Huckerby (yellow card) 90'	Report	Kirovski (yellow card) 28'; Kirovski 65'	Stadium: Oakland–Alameda County Coliseum; Attendance: 17,128; Referee: Yader Reyes

July 4, 2009	Real Salt Lake	1–1	San Jose Earthquakes	Sandy, Utah
	Williams (yellow card) 43'; Espindola (red card) 77'; Leitch 91+' (o.g.)	Report	Campos (yellow card) 13'; Salinas (yellow card) 47'; Alvarez 63'; McDonald (yellow card) 75'; Hernandez (yellow card) 76'; Leitch (yellow card) 86'; Cannon (yellow card) 95+'	Stadium: Rio Tinto Stadium; Attendance: 17,478; Referee: Michael Kennedy

July 11, 2009	San Jose Earthquakes	1–3	Toronto FC	Santa Clara, California, United States
	Huckerby 32'; Alvarez (yellow card) 53'	(report)	Barrett 5'; Vitti 54'; Barrett 69'; De Rosario (yellow card) 84'	Stadium: Buck Shaw Stadium; Attendance: 9,679; Referee: Abiodun Okulaja

July 18, 2009	Chicago Fire	2–0	San Jose Earthquakes	Bridgeview, Illinois
	Soumaré (yellow card) 17'; Nyarko 82'; Blanco 92+'	Report	Hernandez (yellow card) 2'; Wondolowski (yellow card) 5'; Zaher (yellow card) 90'	Stadium: Toyota Park; Attendance: 14,228; Referee: Jasen Anno

July 25, 2009	San Jose Earthquakes	2–2	D.C. United	Santa Clara, California
	Hernandez (yellow card) 22'; Johnson 36'; Glen 62' (pen.)	Report	Gomez 3' (pen.); Gomez 21'; Olsen (yellow card) 60'; Wallace (yellow card) 62'	Stadium: Buck Shaw Stadium; Attendance: 9,022; Referee: Kevin Stott

August 2, 2009	San Jose Earthquakes	4–0	Seattle Sounders FC	Santa Clara, California
12:00 PST	Alonso 2' (o.g.); Hernandez (yellow card) 27'; Huckerby (yellow card) 37'; Glen 54'; Huckerby 78'; Wondolowski 84'; Wondolowski (yellow card) 85'	Report	Ianni (yellow card) 22'; Riley (red card) 33'; Montero (yellow card) 35'	Stadium: Buck Shaw Stadium; Attendance: 9,919; Referee: Paul Ward

August 8, 2009	San Jose Earthquakes	0–3	Columbus Crew	San Francisco, California
	Salinas (yellow card) 55'	Report	Lenhart (yellow card) 53'; Carroll (yellow card) 67'; Moreno 69'; Rogers 73'; Moffat 86'	Stadium: Candlestick Park; Attendance: 61,572; Referee: Jeff Gontarek

August 22, 2009	San Jose Earthquakes	1–0	Kansas City Wizards	Santa Clara, California
	Hernandez (yellow card) 52'; Alvarez (yellow card) 81'; Wondolowski 93+'; Luiz (yellow card) 94+'	Report	Arnaud (yellow card) 87'; Lopez (yellow card) 90'; Besler (yellow card) 91+'	Stadium: Buck Shaw Stadium; Attendance: 9,031; Referee: Ricardo Salazar

August 29, 2009	New England Revolution	2–1	San Jose Earthquakes	Foxborough, Massachusetts
	Ralston 68'; Thompson 74'; Thompson (yellow card) 75'	Report	Corrales (yellow card) 4'; Sanchez (yellow card) 48'; Sanchez 92+'	Stadium: Gillette Stadium; Attendance: 7,286; Referee: Alex Prus

September 18, 2009	San Jose Earthquakes	1–1	Colorado Rapids	Santa Clara, California
	Johnson 8'; Leitch (yellow card) 94+'; McDonald (yellow card) 95+'	Report	Baudet (yellow card) 33'; Casey 95+' (pen.)	Stadium: Buck Shaw Stadium; Attendance: 10,525; Referee: Edvin Jurisevic

September 23, 2009	Colorado Rapids	1–1	San Jose Earthquakes	Commerce City, Colorado
	Casey 93+' (pen.)	Report	Wondolowski 67' (pen.); Cannon (yellow card) 91+'	Stadium: Dick's Sporting Goods Park; Attendance: 6,234; Referee: Ricardo Salazar

September 27, 2009	D.C. United	1–2	San Jose Earthquakes	Washington, D.C. United States
	Moreno 26'; Wallace (yellow card) 54'; Pontius (yellow card) 68'	Report	McDonald (yellow card) 28'; Sanchez 58'; Johnson 73'	Stadium: Robert F. Kennedy Memorial Stadium; Attendance: 14,375; Referee: Baldomero Toledo

October 3, 2009	San Jose Earthquakes	1–0	New York Red Bulls	Santa Clara, California
	Johnson 24' (pen.)	Report	Richards (yellow card) 46+'	Stadium: Buck Shaw Stadium; Attendance: 10,525; Referee: Steven DePiero

October 7, 2009	San Jose Earthquakes	1–2	FC Dallas	Santa Clara, California
	Convey (yellow card) 18'; Ribeiro (yellow card) 32'; Amarikwa 73'	Report	Ferreira 49'; Cunningham 81'; Ihemelu (yellow card) 90'	Stadium: Buck Shaw Stadium; Attendance: 9,023; Referee: Hilario Grajeda

October 10, 2009	Toronto FC	1–1	San Jose Earthquakes	Toronto, Ontario Canada
	Attakora 47'; Serioux (yellow card) 69'; Brennan (yellow card) 90'; De Rosario (yellow card) 95+'	Report	Amarikwa (yellow card) 74'; Glen 93+'	Stadium: BMO Field; Attendance: 20,571; Referee: Mark Geiger

October 17, 2009	Chivas USA	2–2	San Jose Earthquakes	Carson, California
	Galindo 7'; Cuesta (yellow card) 36'; Braun 66'; Santos (yellow card) 74'	Report	McDonald 21'; Johnson 58'	Stadium: The Home Depot Center; Attendance: 12,316; Referee: Ricardo Salazar

October 24, 2009	Los Angeles Galaxy	2–0	San Jose Earthquakes	Carson, California
	Burling 24' (o.g.); Donovan 77'; Gonzalez (yellow card) 78'	Report	Convey (yellow card) 17'; Alvarez (yellow card) 69'	Stadium: The Home Depot Center; Attendance: 27,000; Referee: Silviu Petrescu

=== U.S. Open Cup qualification ===
April 29, 2009 Qualification semifinals	San Jose Earthquakes	1–2	New York Red Bulls	Santa Clara, California
	Salinas (yellow card) 39'; Campos (yellow card) 47'; Denton (yellow card) 67'; Campos 71'	Report	Petke 2'; Sassano (yellow card) 76'; Wolyniec 80'; Pietravallo (yellow card) 82'	Stadium: Buck Shaw Stadium; Attendance: 4,011; Referee: Alejandro Mariscal

=== Major League Soccer ===
==== Standings ====
Pos	Team	Pld	W	L	T	GF	GA	GD	Pts	Qualification
1	LA Galaxy	30	12	6	12	36	31	+5	48	MLS Cup Playoffs
2	Houston Dynamo	30	13	8	9	39	29	+10	48	MLS Cup Playoffs
3	Seattle Sounders FC	30	12	7	11	38	29	+9	47	MLS Cup Playoffs
4	Chivas USA	30	13	11	6	34	31	+3	45	MLS Cup Playoffs
5	Real Salt Lake	30	11	12	7	43	35	+8	40	MLS Cup Playoffs
6	Colorado Rapids	30	10	10	10	42	38	+4	40	
7	FC Dallas	30	11	13	6	50	47	+3	39	
8	San Jose Earthquakes	30	7	14	9	36	50	−14	30	

Source: MLS

Pos	Team	Pld	W	L	T	GF	GA	GD	Pts	Qualification
1	Columbus Crew (S)	30	13	7	10	41	31	+10	49	CONCACAF Champions League
2	LA Galaxy	30	12	6	12	36	31	+5	48	CONCACAF Champions League
3	Houston Dynamo	30	13	8	9	39	29	+10	48	North American SuperLiga
4	Seattle Sounders FC	30	12	7	11	38	29	+9	47	CONCACAF Champions League
5	Chicago Fire	30	11	7	12	39	34	+5	45	North American SuperLiga
6	Chivas USA	30	13	11	6	34	31	+3	45	North American SuperLiga
7	New England Revolution	30	11	10	9	33	37	−4	42	North American SuperLiga
8	Real Salt Lake (C)	30	11	12	7	43	35	+8	40	CONCACAF Champions League
9	Colorado Rapids	30	10	10	10	42	38	+4	40	
10	D.C. United	30	9	8	13	43	44	−1	40	
11	FC Dallas	30	11	13	6	50	47	+3	39	
12	Toronto FC	30	10	11	9	37	46	−9	39	CONCACAF Champions League
13	Kansas City Wizards	30	8	13	9	33	42	−9	33	
14	San Jose Earthquakes	30	7	14	9	36	50	−14	30	
15	New York Red Bulls	30	5	19	6	27	47	−20	21	

Source: MLS
Rules for classification: 1) points; 2) head-to-head record; 3) goal difference; 4) number of goals scored
(C) Champions; (S) Supporters' Shield
