= Brett Jones =

Brett Jones may refer to:

== Sports ==
- Bret Jones (born 1980), American soccer player
- Brett Jones (footballer) (born 1982), Australian rules footballer
- Brett Jones (gridiron football) (born 1991), Canadian football center, also played in the United States

== Others ==
- Brett Jones (songwriter), American singer and songwriter
- Brett Jones (born 1989), petitioner in United States Supreme Court case Jones v. Mississippi (2021)
