= 2003 MLS SuperDraft =

College draft for soccer teams

General information
- Sport: Soccer
- Date: January 17, 2003
- Location: Kansas City, Missouri
- Network: Fox Sports World

Overview
- 60 total selections
- First selection: Alecko Eskandarian, D.C. United

The 2003 MLS Superdraft was held January 17, 2003 in Kansas City, Missouri. It was the fifth annual SuperDraft held by Major League Soccer.

== Player selection ==
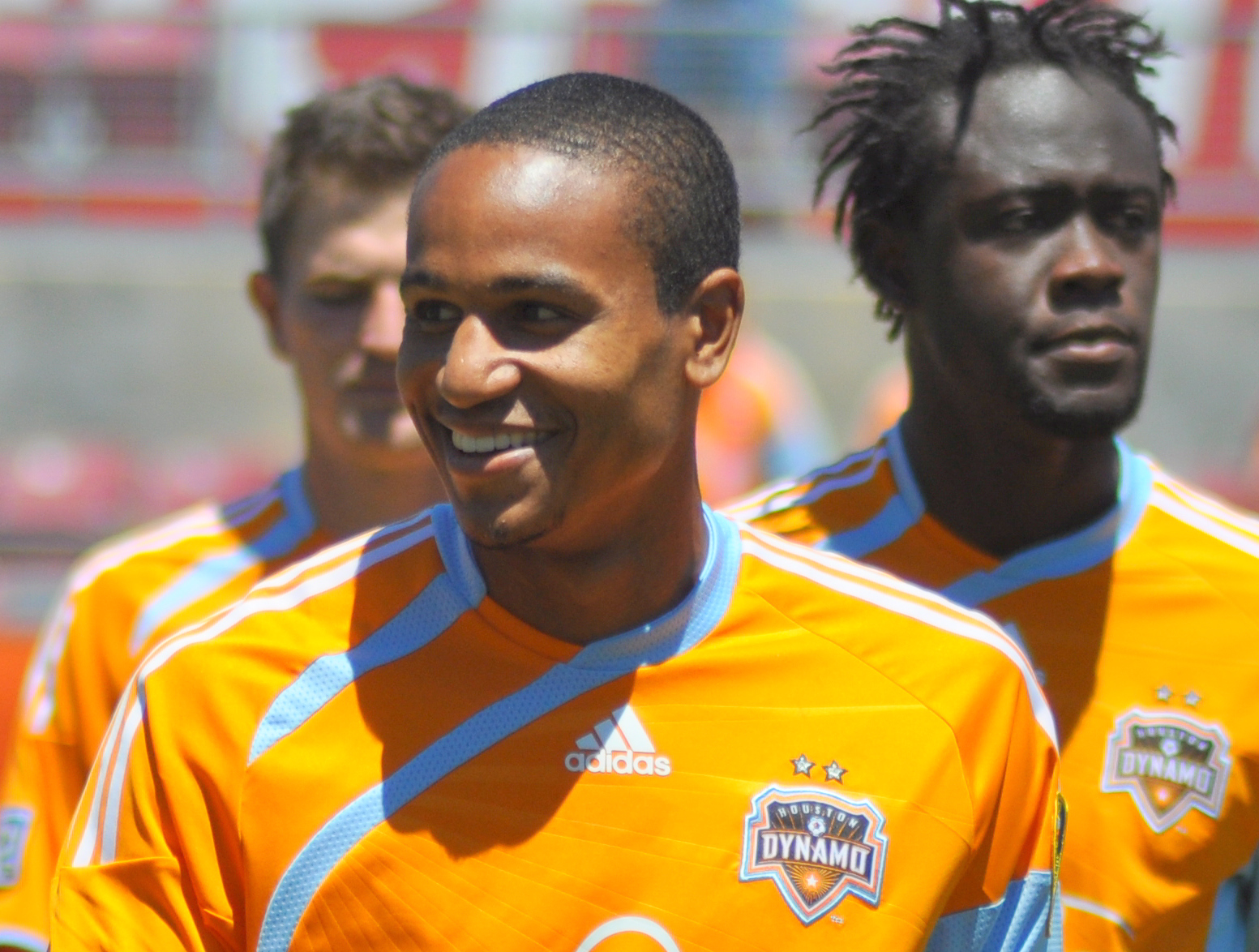
The MetroStars selected Ricardo Clark second overall. A 3x MLS All-Star, he was named to the 2006 MLS Best XI. Clark earned 34 caps with the US Men's National Team and was selected to the 2010 FIFA World Cup squad.

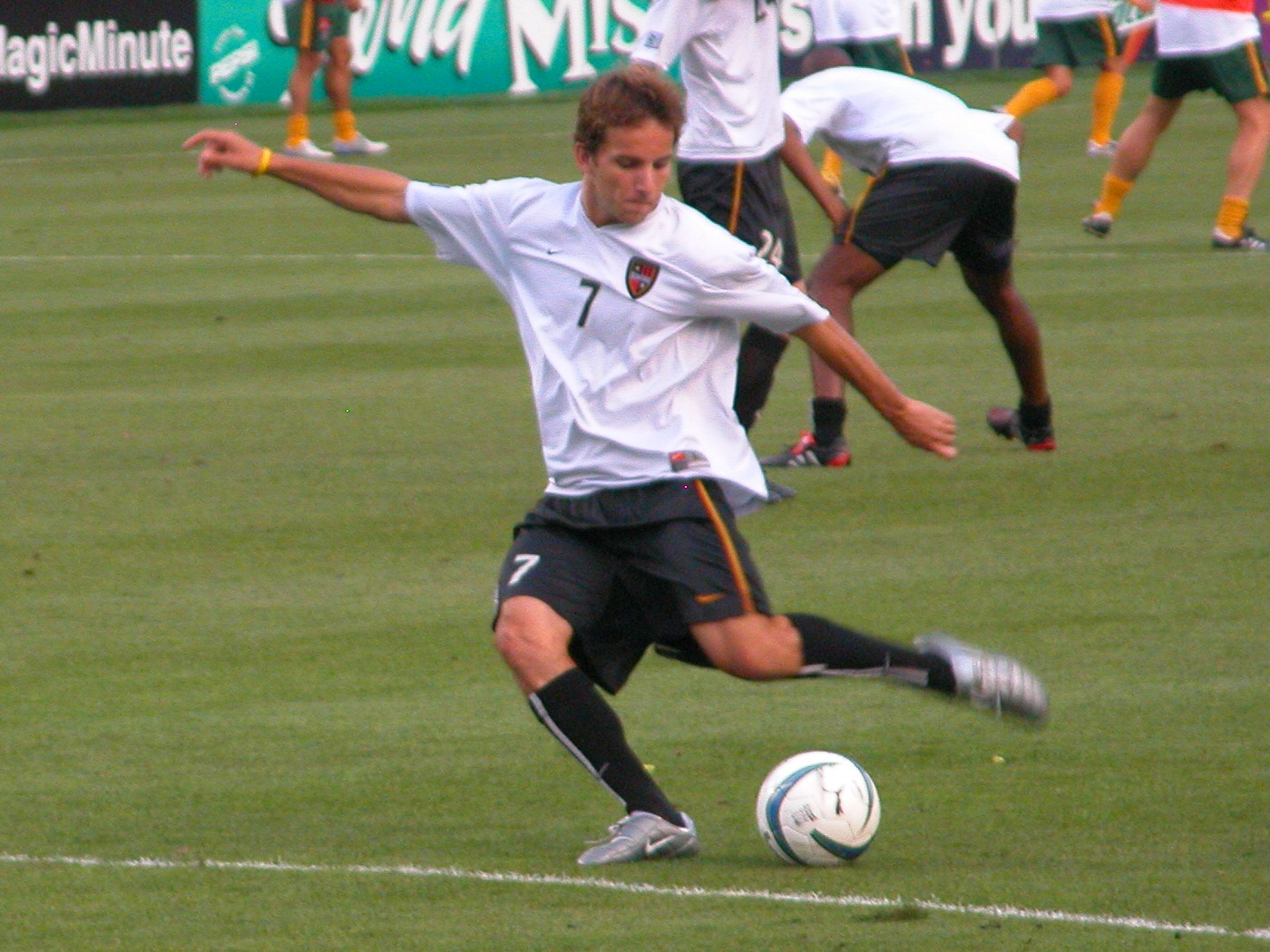
The MetroStars selected Mike Magee 4th overall. In 2013, he won the Major League Soccer MVP and was named to the MLS Best XI.

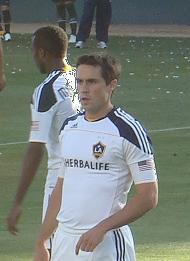
San Jose selected Todd Dunivant 6th overall. He was named to the 2011 MLS Best XI.

Key

*	Denotes a player contracted under the Project-40 program
^	Denotes player who has been selected to an MLS All-Star Game
§	Denotes a player who won the MLS Rookie of the Year
†	Denotes player who has been selected for an MLS Best XI team
~	Denotes a player who won the MLS MVP

=== Round One ===
Pick #	MLS team	Player	Position	Affiliation
1	D.C. United	Alecko Eskandarian*^	F	University of Virginia
2	MetroStars	Ricardo Clark*^†	M	Furman University
3	Chicago Fire (Note: #3: Kansas City Wizards → Chicago Fire. 2003-01-07: Chicago Fire acquired this first-round pick from Kansas City Wizards in exchange for forward Josh Wolff.)	Nate Jaqua*^	F	University of Portland
4	MetroStars (Note: #4: Chicago Fire → Dallas Burn → MetroStars. 2003-01-17: MetroStars acquired this first-round pick from Dallas Burn in exchange for midfielder Brad Davis. On 2002-05-18, Dallas had acquired this pick from Chicago Fire in exchange for a third-round pick in the 2003 SuperDraft and an undisclosed amount of salary cap relief.)	Mike Magee*^†~	F	Nike Project-40
5	D.C. United (Note: #5: Dallas Burn → MetroStars → D.C. United. 2002-12-23: D.C. United acquired this first-round pick, defender Mike Petke, and an allocation from MetroStars in exchange for defender Eddie Pope, midfielder Richie Williams, and forward Jaime Moreno. (Note: "MetroStars trade for United's Pope". Sports Illustrated. December 23, 2002.) On 2002-03-13, MetroStars had acquired this pick and midfielder Winston Griffiths from Dallas Burn in exchange for goalkeeper D.J. Countess and a second-round pick in the 2003 SuperDraft.)	David Stokes*	D	University of North Carolina
6	San Jose Earthquakes	Todd Dunivant	D	Stanford University
7	Columbus Crew	Diego Walsh	M	Southern Methodist University
8	Los Angeles Galaxy (Note: #8: Colorado Rapids → Los Angeles Galaxy. 2001-04-02: Los Angeles Galaxy acquired this first-round pick from Colorado Rapids as part of a trade for defender Robin Fraser.)	Guillermo Gonzalez*	M	Nike Project-40
9	New England Revolution (Note: #9: New England Revolution → Miami Fusion → New England Revolution. 2001-08-16: New England Revolution re-acquired this first-round pick and acquired defender Leo Cullen from Miami Fusion in exchange for forward Johnny Torres and midfielder Shaker Asad. On 2001-06-20, Miami had acquired this pick and defender Brian Dunseth from New England in exchange for a second-round pick in the 2003 SuperDraft and defender Jay Heaps.)	Pat Noonan^	F	Indiana University
10	Dallas Burn (Note: #10: Los Angeles Galaxy → Dallas Burn. 2003-01-17: Dallas Burn acquired this first-round pick from Los Angeles Galaxy in exchange for selections in the second-round and sixth-round.)	Shavar Thomas	D	University of Connecticut

=== Round Two ===
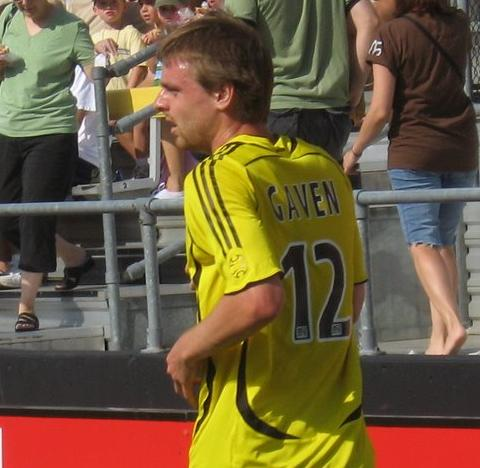
The MetroStars selected Eddie Gaven12th overall. He was named to the 2004 MLS Best XI.

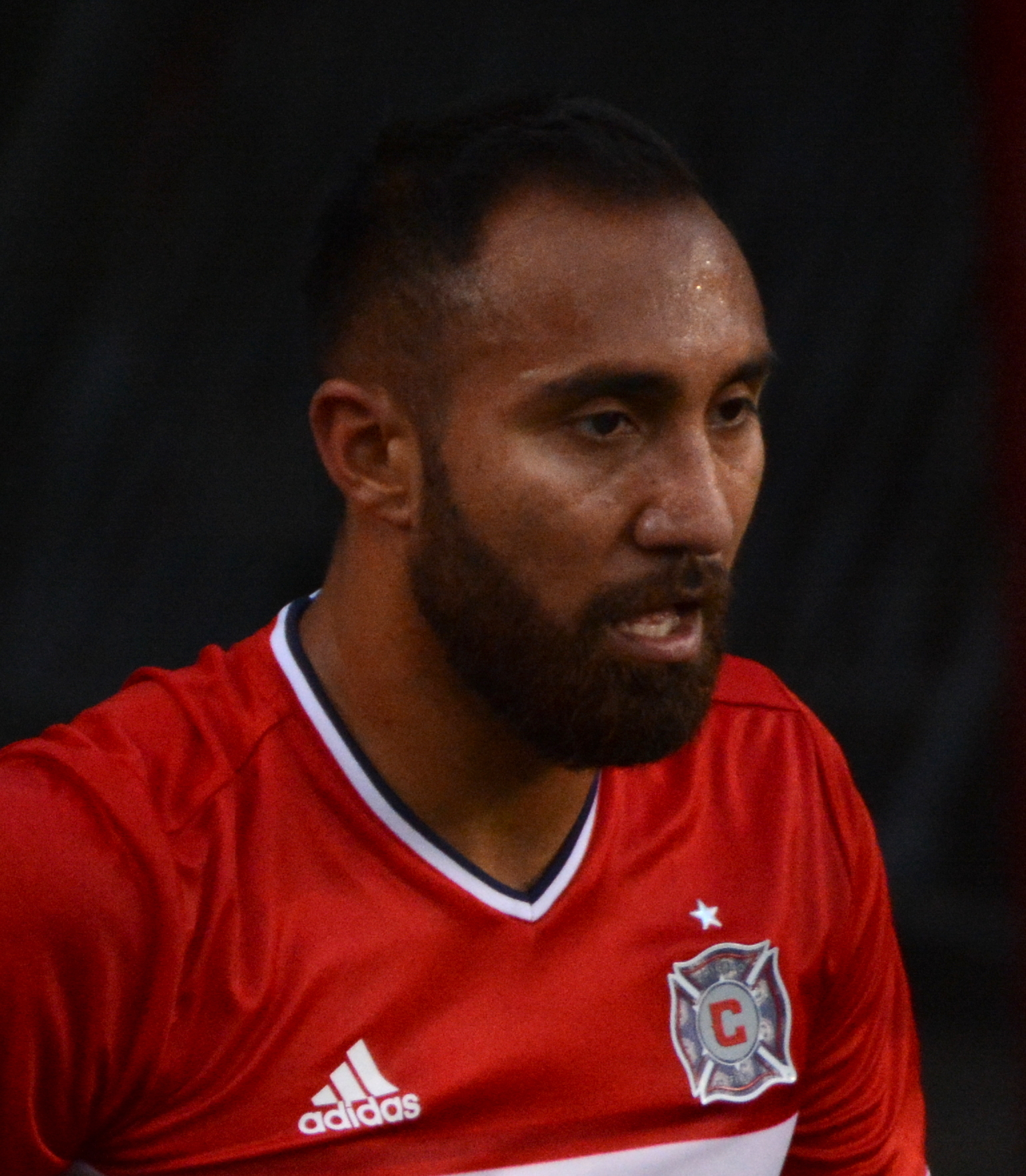
The Earthquakes selected Arturo Álvarez 13th overall. With the National Team from El Salvador, he earned 46 caps.

Pick #	MLS team	Player	Position	Affiliation
11	D.C. United	Brian Carroll*	M	Wake Forest University
12	MetroStars (Note: #12: MetroStars → Dallas Burn → Los Angeles Galaxy → MetroStars. 2003-01-17: MetroStars acquired this second-round pick from Los Angeles Galaxy in exchange for a first-round selection in the 2004 MLS SuperDraft. Earlier in the day, Los Angeles had acquired this pick and a sixth-round pick from Dallas Burn in exchange for a first-round selection. On 2002-03-13, Dallas had acquired this pick and goalkeeper D.J. Countess from MetroStars in exchange for midfielder Winston Griffiths and a first-round pick in the 2003 SuperDraft.)	Eddie Gaven*^†	M	Nike Project-40
13	San Jose Earthquakes (Note: #13: Kansas City Wizards → D.C. United → Kansas City Wizards → San Jose Earthquakes. 2003-01-17: San Jose Earthquakes acquired this second-round pick and a conditional selection in the 2004 MLS SuperDraft from Kansas City Wizards in exchange for defender Jimmy Conrad. On 2002-07-29, Kansas City had re-acquired this selection and a third-round pick in the 2004 SuperDraft from D.C. United in exchange for a Discovery Pick. On 2002-02-10, D.C. United had acquired future considerations, which became this pick, from Kansas City in exchange for defender Carey Talley.)	Arturo Alvarez*	M	Nike Project-40
14	D.C. United (Note: #14: Chicago Fire → D.C. United. 2002-07-18: D.C. United acquired this second-round pick from Chicago Fire in exchange for defender Orlando Perez.)	Doug Warren	GK	Clemson University
15	Dallas Burn	Jason Thompson*	F	Eastern Illinois University
16	Los Angeles Galaxy (Note: #16: San Jose Earthquakes → Los Angeles Galaxy. 2003-01-17: Los Angeles Galaxy acquired this second-round pick from San Jose Earthquakes in exchange for forward Brian Mullan.)	Scot Thompson	D	UCLA
17	MetroStars (Note: #17: Columbus Crew → MetroStars. 2003-01-17: MetroStars acquired this second-round pick from Columbus Crew in exchange for defender Nelson Akwari and a second-round selection in the 2004 MLS SuperDraft.)	Tim Regan	D	Bradley University
18	Chicago Fire (Note: #18: Colorado Rapids → Chicago Fire. 2002-05-09: Chicago Fire acquired this second-round pick from Colorado Rapids in exchange for midfielder Raúl Palacios.)	Damani Ralph^§	F	University of Connecticut
19	Los Angeles Galaxy (Note: #19: New England Revolution → Los Angeles Galaxy. 2003-01-17: Los Angeles Galaxy acquired this second-round pick and midfielder Alex Pineda Chacón from New England Revolution in exchange for goalkeeper Matt Reis.)	Arturo Torres	M	Loyola Marymount University
20	Los Angeles Galaxy (Note: #20: Los Angeles Galaxy → D.C. United → Los Angeles Galaxy. 2002-08-15: Los Angeles Galaxy re-acquired this second-round pick, originally a conditional selection, from D.C. United in exchange for forward Henry Zambrano. On 2002-01-12, D.C. United had acquired this pick and first-round and second-round selections in the 2002 MLS SuperDraft from Los Angeles in exchange for forward Chris Albright and a second-round pick in the 2002 SuperDraft.)	Ricky Lewis*	D	Clemson University

=== Round Three ===
Pick #	MLS team	Player	Position	Affiliation
21	Dallas Burn (Note: #21: D.C. United → Dallas Burn. 2002-03-13: Dallas Burn acquired this third-round pick from D.C. United in exchange for forward Ali Curtis.)	David Comfort	GK	University of Virginia
22	New England Revolution (Note: #22: MetroStars → New England Revolution. 2002-02-10: New England Revolution acquired this third-round pick from MetroStars in exchange for a third-round pick in the 2002 MLS SuperDraft.)	Dimelon Westfield	F	Clemson University
23	San Jose Earthquakes (Note: #23: Kansas City Wizards → San Jose Earthquakes. 2001-03-13: San Jose Earthquakes acquired this third-round selection, originally a conditional pick, and a second-round selection in the 2002 MLS SuperDraft, also originally a conditional selection, from Kansas City Wizards in exchange for defender Mike Burns.)	Roger Levesque	F	Stanford University
24	Chicago Fire	Logan Pause*	M	University of North Carolina
25	Chicago Fire (Note: #25: Dallas Burn → Chicago Fire. 2001-03-27: Chicago Fire acquired this third-round pick from Dallas Burn in exchange for goalkeeper Chris Snitko.)	Ryan Mack	M	Indiana University
26	Chicago Fire (Note: #26: San Jose Earthquakes → Dallas Burn → Chicago Fire. 2002-05-18: Chicago Fire acquired this third-round pick and an undisclosed amount of salary cap relief from Dallas Burn in exchange for a first-round pick in the 2003 SuperDraft. On 2002-02-10, Dallas had acquired this pick from San Jose Earthquakes in exchange for a third-round selection in the 2002 MLS SuperDraft.)	Phil Swenda	F	Seton Hall University
27	Colorado Rapids (Note: #27: Columbus Crew → Colorado Rapids. 2003-01-17: Colorado Rapids acquired this third-round pick from Columbus Crew in exchange for a sixth-round pick in the 2003 SuperDraft and a third-round selection in the 2004 MLS SuperDraft.)	Jason Cole	D	St. Louis University
28	Colorado Rapids	Alex Blake	F	Williams College
29	New England Revolution	Kyle Singer	GK	Boston College
30	MetroStars (Note: #30: Los Angeles Galaxy → MetroStars. 2002-04-20: MetroStars acquired this third-round pick, originally a conditional pick, from Los Angeles Galaxy in exchange for midfielder Winston Griffiths.)	Tim Glowienka	D	University of South Carolina

=== Round Four ===
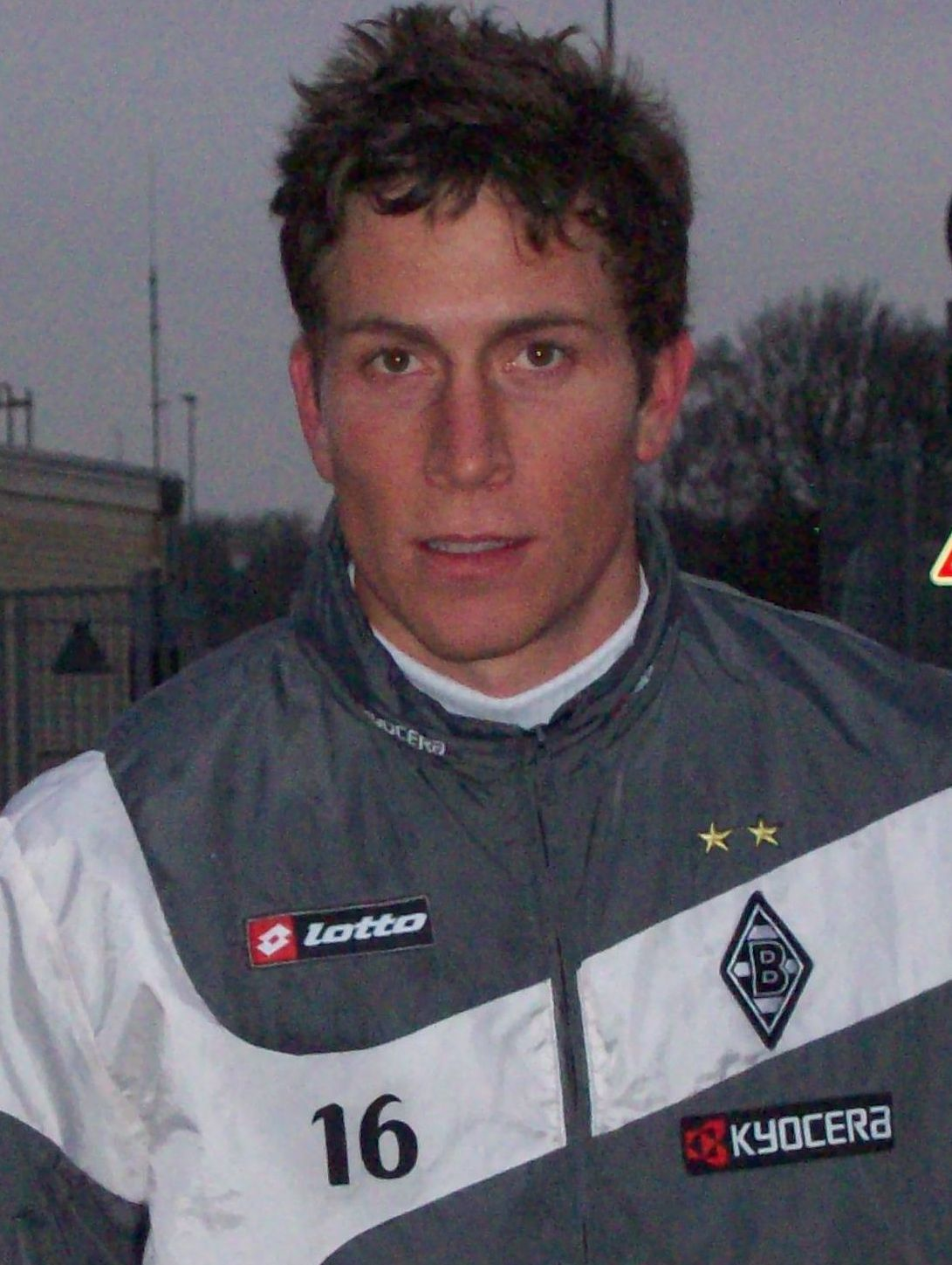
The Chicago Fire selected Rob Friend 35th overall despite him previously signing a contract with Norwegian club Moss FK. He would play in Major League Soccer in 2014. He earned 32 caps with the Canada Men's National Team.

Pick #	MLS team	Player	Position	Affiliation
31	D.C. United	Hayden Woodworth	M	Messiah College
32	MetroStars	Kenny Arena	D	University of Virginia
33	Kansas City Wizards	Taylor Graham	D	Stanford University
34	Dallas Burn (Note: #34: Chicago Fire → Dallas Burn. 2002-01-15: Dallas Burn acquired this fourth-round pick, originally a conditional selection, and a sixth-round pick in the 2002 MLS SuperDraft from Chicago Fire in exchange for forward Aleksey Korol and midfielder Miguel Saavedra.)	Mike Tranchilla	F	Creighton University
35	Chicago Fire (Note: #35: Dallas Burn → Chicago Fire. 2003-01-17: Chicago Fire acquired this fourth-round pick from Dallas Burn in exchange for a third-round selection in the 2004 MLS SuperDraft.)	Rob Friend	F	UC Santa Barbara
36	San Jose Earthquakes	Josh Saunders^	GK	University of California
37	Columbus Crew	Michael Ritch	F	Auburn University
38	Colorado Rapids	Matt Crawford	M	University of North Carolina
39	San Jose Earthquakes (Note: #39: New England Revolution → San Jose Earthquakes. 2002-07-30: San Jose Earthquakes acquired this fourth-round pick from New England Revolution in exchange for salary budget relief.)	Jamil Walker	M	Santa Clara University
40	Los Angeles Galaxy	Hamid Mehreioskouei	F	Bradley University

=== Round Five ===
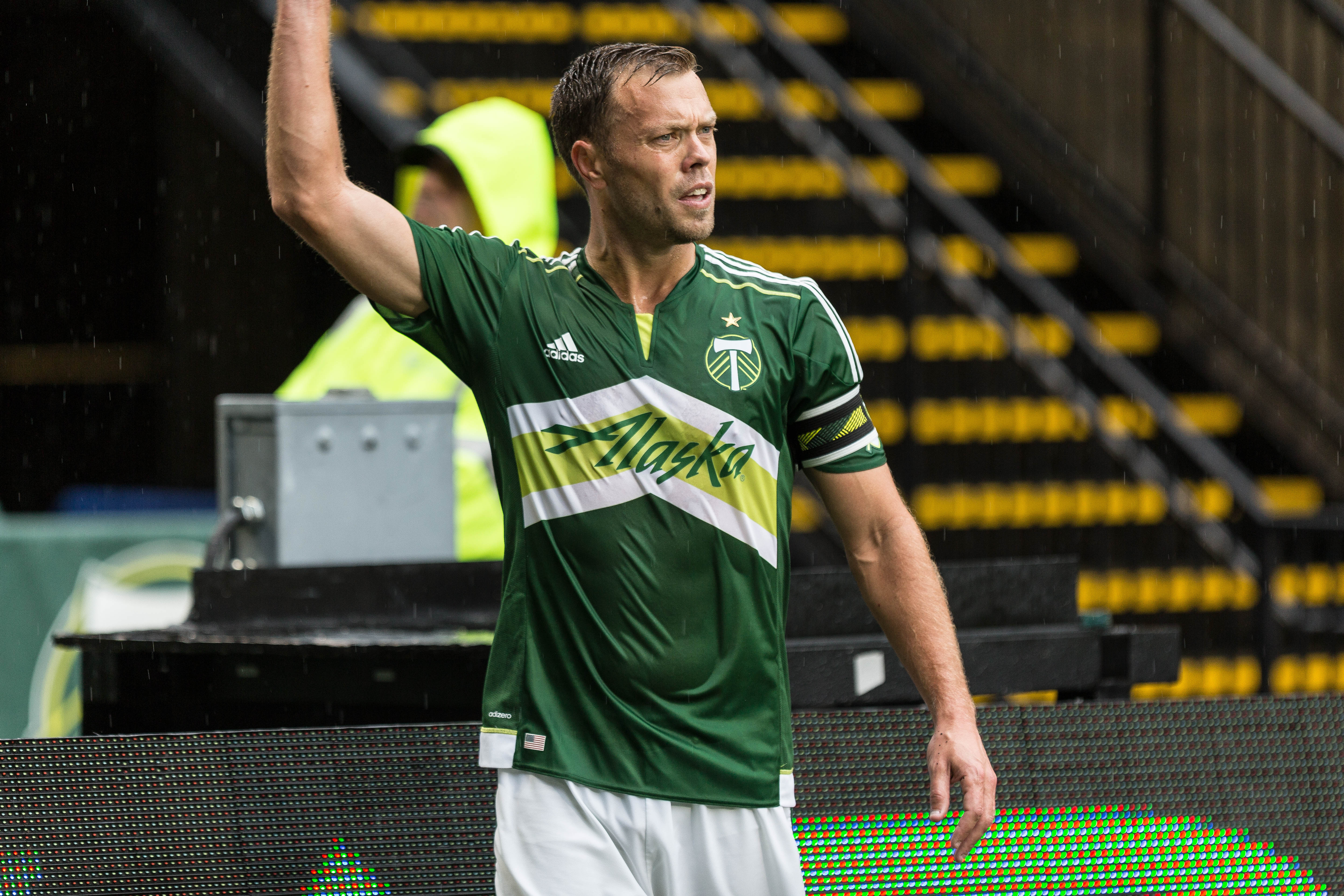
The Kansas City Wizards selected Jack Jewsbury 43 overall. He was selected to the 2011 MLS All-Star Game.

Pick #	MLS team	Player	Position	Affiliation
41	D.C. United	John Swann	D	Indiana University
42	MetroStars	Jacob LeBlanc*	M	University of Virginia
43	Kansas City Wizards	Jack Jewsbury^	M	St. Louis University
44	Chicago Fire	Chad Dombrowski	D	University of Wisconsin–Milwaukee
45	Dallas Burn	Michael Mariscalco	M	Butler University
46	San Jose Earthquakes	Johanes Maliza	M	Stanford University
47	Columbus Crew	Guy Abrahamson	M	Rutgers University
48	Colorado Rapids	Casey Schmidt	F	Boston College
49	MetroStars (Note: #49: New England Revolution → MetroStars. 2003-01-17: MetroStars acquired this fifth-round pick from New England Revolution in exchange for a sixth-round selection in the 2004 MLS SuperDraft.)	Marco Vélez	M	Barry University
50	Los Angeles Galaxy	Jimmy Frazelle	M	UCLA

=== Round Six ===
Pick #	MLS team	Player	Position	Affiliation
51	D.C. United	Michael Behonick	GK	American University
52	Dallas Burn (Note: #52: MetroStars → Dallas Burn. 2002-02-10: Dallas Burn acquired this sixth-round pick from MetroStars in exchange for a sixth-round selection in the 2002 MLS SuperDraft.)	Andy Rosenband	F	Ohio State University
53	Kansas City Wizards	Kevin Friedland	D	Southern Methodist University
54	Chicago Fire	Ryan Futagaki	M	UCLA
55	Los Angeles Galaxy (Note: #55: Dallas Burn → Los Angeles Galaxy. 2003-01-17: Los Angeles Galaxy acquired this sixth-round pick and a second-round pick from Dallas Burn in exchange for a first-round selection.)	Joe Barton	GK	Cal State-Northridge
56	San Jose Earthquakes	Frank Sanfilippo	M	San Jose State University
57	New England Revolution (Note: #57: Columbus Crew → New England Revolution. 2002-02-10: New England Revolution acquired this sixth-round pick from Columbus Crew in exchange for a fifth-round selection in the 2002 MLS SuperDraft.)	PASS		
58	Columbus Crew (Note: #58: Colorado Rapids → Columbus Crew. 2003-01-17: Columbus Crew acquired this sixth-round pick and a third-round selection in the 2004 MLS SuperDraft from Colorado Rapids in exchange for a third-round pick in the 2003 SuperDraft.)	Jake Traeger	M	Ohio State University
59	D.C. United (Note: #59: Pick originally belonged to New England Revolution. Info needed on how D.C. acquired this pick.)	PASS		
60	Kansas City Wizards (Note: #60: Los Angeles Galaxy → Kansas City Wizards. 2003-01-17: Kansas City Wizards acquired this sixth-round pick from Los Angeles Galaxy in exchange for a sixth-round selection in the 2004 MLS SuperDraft.)	Byron Carmichael	F	Marshall University

== Notable undrafted players ==
Player	Pos	Affiliation	Played in MLS	Notes
Troy Perkins	GK	University of Evansville	2004–07; 2010–15	7 caps with U.S. national team; 2006 MLS Best XI
