= Michael Ritch (soccer) =

American soccer player

Personal information
- Date of birth: April 26, 1981 (age 45)
- Place of birth: Tallassee, Alabama, United States
- Height: 6 ft 3 in (1.91 m)
- Positions: Midfielder; striker

Youth career
- 1999–2002: Auburn-Montgomery

Senior career*
Years	Team	Apps	(Gls)
2003–2004	Columbus Crew	15	(1)
2003	→ Syracuse Salty Dogs (loan)	3	(1)
- * Club domestic league appearances and goals as of July 25, 2007

Michael Ritch (born April 26, 1981, in Tallassee, Alabama) is an American soccer striker, who last played for the Columbus Crew of Major League Soccer.

Ritch played college soccer at Auburn University Montgomery in the NAIA from 1999 to 2002, where he helped lead the team to four straight conference championships. Ritch was named a second-team All-American in 2001, and as a senior, after scoring 29 goals with 15 assists in 23 games, he was named a first team All-American. Ritch finished his career at the school with 64 goals and 48 assists.

In December 2002, Ritch was selected as the #1 overall pick in the 2003 A-League College Draft by the Syracuse Salty Dogs. Upon graduating from college, Ritch was drafted 37th overall in the 2003 MLS SuperDraft by the Columbus Crew, and signed a two-year contract with the club. This made Michael the first ever player drafted in the MLS from the state of Alabama. He only played 21 minutes over three games as a rookie, however in his second year, Ritch appeared in 12 games (4 as a starter) and finished the year with one goal and one assist. In 2003, the Crew sent Ritch on loan to the Salty Dogs for three games.

Michael Ritch is currently the Executive Director at Louisiana Krewe Rush in Lafayette, LA.
