= Ross Paule =

American soccer player (born 1976)

Personal information
- Date of birth: April 4, 1976 (age 50)
- Place of birth: Memphis, Tennessee, United States
- Height: 5 ft 10 in (1.78 m)
- Position: Midfielder

Youth career
- 1994–1996: Creighton

Senior career*
Years	Team	Apps	(Gls)
1997–2000	Colorado Rapids	111	(18)
1997	→ Colorado Foxes (loan)	4	(3)
2001–2002	MetroStars	31	(2)
2003–2005	Columbus Crew	50	(11)
Total		196	(34)

Managerial career
- 2015–2023: Creighton (women)
- 2018–: US Women's U-17
- * Club domestic league appearances and goals

Ross Paule (born April 4, 1976) is an American former soccer midfielder, who last played for the Columbus Crew of Major League Soccer.

== Playing career ==
Paule moved from Dallas, TX as a youth and joined the Memphis Futbol Club in Memphis, Tennessee. Paule also starred for Houston High School in Germantown, Tennessee where he was awarded the Commercial Appeal's Best of the Preps title.

Paule played college soccer at Creighton University, but left only after three seasons, becoming one of the first players to leave college early for a jump to MLS. He was drafted 11th overall by the Colorado Rapids in the 1997 MLS College Draft, and became a regular right away, a starter by his second season, appearing in 19 games and starting seven. Paule's best year with the Rapids came in 1998, when he tallied ten goals and six assists. He stayed with the team through 2001, running the team's midfield, and was atop the league's assist charts at midseason, when the Rapids traded for midfield maestro Carlos Valderrama. With no place for Paule on the squad, he was dealt to the MetroStars for Steve Shak and a draft pick.

Paule spent the rest of 2001 and all of 2002 with the Metros, usually playing—in a new out-of-position role of defensive midfielder, as mandated by Metro coach Octavio Zambrano. Ross was traded to Columbus prior to the 2003 season for Chris Leitch and Jeff Matteo and spent the next two seasons there, scoring seven goals in 2004, including a hat-trick against Los Angeles Galaxy. In eight years in MLS, his totals are 31 goals and 41 assists.

Paule retired early into the 2005 season because of post-concussion syndrome. He then went on to coach a local club, WASA, for the u12A girls team. After his first season with them he moved back to Memphis and is now the executive director of the Fellowship of Christian Athletes Soccer where he is producing a Soccer Themed New Testament with high-profile professional soccer player testimonies inserted into the New Testament. Each testimony is unique as Paule is connecting the players character trait to a person of faith throughout the Bible. He also is the executive director of newly formed Arlington Soccer Academy in TN.

== Career highlights ==
Ross Paule was inducted into the Creighton University Athletic Hall of Fame in 2011.

=== United States National Team ===
- U17 US National Team (1991–92)
- U20 US National Team (1993–95)
- US Men's Full National Team Pool Player (1998–2001)

=== Major League Soccer (MLS) ===
- Played in MLS Cup Championship as a rookie vs. DC United – 1997
- Top three Rookie of the Year – 1997
- MLS Player of the Month – 1998
- MVP for Colorado Rapids – 1998
- MLS All Star Team – 1998 and 1999
- MVP for Columbus Crew – 2003
- Top three MLS Goal of the Year – 2004

== Coaching ==
Ross has continued with his interest in soccer, serving as a coach and mentor to others, focusing on using his professional experience to develop youth soccer in the US. Ross has been involved in coaching youth soccer at the US National level through the Adidas ESP Program, where he is a Staff Coach since 2006. Adidas ESP is one of the Nation's Top Events for the elite US players ages 12–18. 300+ College coaches and professional scouts attend this event to see the best talent the US has to offer.

- Columbus Crew, Assistant Coach (MLS) – 2005
- Memphis Futbol Club Youth Director – 2005 – 2009
- Tennessee Rush Technical Director – 2009 – 2011
- Tennessee Olympic Development Program (ODP) Staff Coach – 2007
- Arlington Soccer Academy Executive Director – 2011 to Present
- Fellowship of Christian Athletes (FCA) Soccer National Director and leading the National Soccer Ministry – 2011 – 2015
- Creighton University Women's Soccer Coach – 2014 – 2023
- Paule was Awarded The Big East Coaching Staff of the Year- 2020

== Personal life ==
In 1997, Ross married Laurie Paule. He has three children, Jorden, Emma, and Rossi. They currently live in Tennessee, where Ross' wife serves as the Director/Owner of the Arlington Recreation Soccer academy with over 600 players. All three of his children play with the Arlington Soccer Academy.

== Honors ==
Individual

- MLS All-Star, 1998, 1999
