= Daniel Torres (Costa Rican footballer) =

Costa Rican footballer (born 1977)

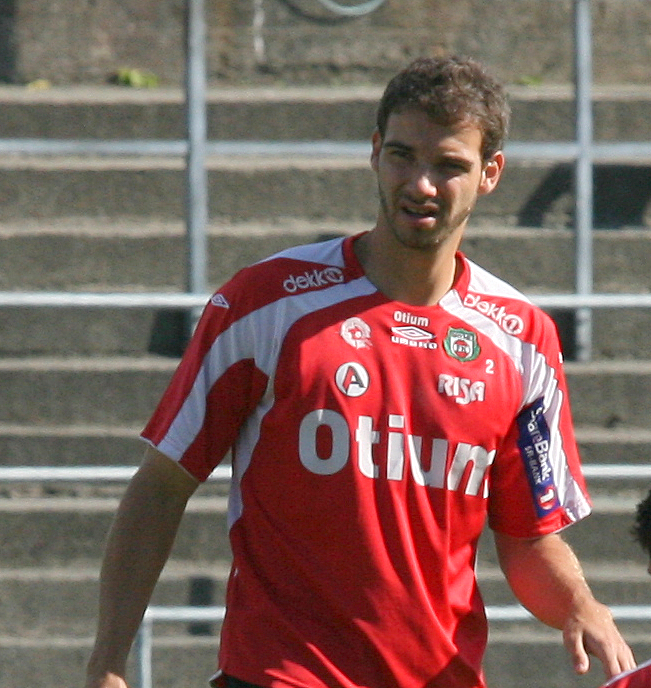

Personal information
- Full name: Daniel Torres González
- Date of birth: October 14, 1977 (age 49)
- Place of birth: Moravia, Costa Rica
- Height: 1.81 m (5 ft 11 1/2 in)
- Position: Defender

Senior career*
Years	Team	Apps	(Gls)
1996–1997	Deportivo Saprissa	2	(0)
1997–1998	Ramonense	27	(0)
1998–2001	Deportivo Saprissa	53	(1)
2001–2003	Columbus Crew	34	(0)
2003–2004	Deportivo Saprissa		
2005	Tromsø	12	(0)
2005	Bodens BK	11	(0)
2006–2007	Real Salt Lake	26	(0)
2008	Bryne	12	(0)
2009	FC Dallas	15	(0)

International career^{‡}
2009	Costa Rica	1	(0)
- * Club domestic league appearances and goals as of 25 November 2009 ‡ National team caps and goals as of 3 April 2009

Daniel Torres González (born October 14, 1977) is a retired Costa Rican footballer.

== Career ==
=== Club ===
Torres started his football career with Deportivo Saprissa, making his Primera División debut on 16 February 1996 against Ramonense. With Saprissa, he won several national and international titles between 1996 and 2001.

He signed with the Columbus Crew of Major League Soccer on September 8, 2001. In 2002, Torres appeared in 28 matches for the Crew, starting in 25 of them. He appeared in only eight games in 2003 before being transferred to his former team, Deportivo Saprissa, where he spent 2004 helping the club capture its 24th Costa Rican First Division Title.

In 2005, Torres signed with Tromsø IL of the Norwegian Premier League. He spent part of the season at the club before being transferred to Bodens BK in the Swedish Superettan. He played 11 games for his new club and was named “Player of the Match” five times. Torres made his return to Major League Soccer in the 2006 season, starting in the first 16 games for Real Salt Lake before suffering a season ending foot injury on July 14, 2006 in a 3–1 victory against the New England Revolution. He started in nine of the first ten games of the 2007 season for Real Salt Lake before being transferred to Bryne FK in the Norwegian First Division, where he played through the 2008 season alongside compatriot Carlos Johnson.

Torres signed with FC Dallas on January 27, 2009. He played during the 2009 season, but was waived at the end of the same season.

=== International ===
He played in the 1997 FIFA World Youth Championship, held in Malaysia.

Torres has been capped once for the senior Costa Rica national football team. His lone cap came on January 25, 2009, in a 3-1 victory over Guatemala at the 2009 UNCAF Nations Cup.

== Personal life ==
Torres is a son of José Torres and Yadira González and has two brothers.

== Honors ==
=== Club ===
Columbus Crew

- Lamar Hunt U.S. Open Cup: 2002
