= Jake Traeger =

American soccer player

Jake Traeger (April 16, 1980) is an American retired soccer player.

== College career ==
Traeger played college soccer for the Ohio State Buckeyes. He was team MVP, first-team all-Big Ten Conference, first-team all state, and second-team all region.

== Professional career ==
Traeger was selected 58th overall in the 2003 MLS SuperDraft by the Columbus Crew and made two appearances over two seasons for the Crew.
