= Chad McCarty =

American soccer player and coach

Personal information
- Full name: Chad McCarty
- Date of birth: October 5, 1977 (age 49)
- Place of birth: Fresno, California, United States
- Height: 5 ft 11 in (1.80 m)
- Position: Midfielder

Youth career
- 1995–1997: Washington Huskies

Senior career*
Years	Team	Apps	(Gls)
1998–2001	Tampa Bay Mutiny	62	(2)
1998	→ MLS Pro-40 (loan)	7	(0)
2002–2003	Columbus Crew	37	(0)

International career^{‡}
1999	United States	1	(0)

Managerial career
- California Odyssey
- Clovis North
- * Club domestic league appearances and goals as of 31 May 2006 ‡ National team caps and goals as of 22 June 2006

Chad McCarty (born October 5, 1977, in Fresno, California) is a former U.S. soccer midfielder who spent six seasons in Major League Soccer. He also earned one cap with the U.S. national team in 1999.

== Youth and college ==
McCarty grew up in Clovis, California and attended Clovis High School. After graduating from high school, McCarty attended the University of Washington where he spent three seasons (1995–1997) on the Huskies soccer team. In 1998, he elected to not return for a fourth season and went professional with the Major League Soccer (MLS) Project-40 team.

== MLS ==
After McCarty signed with Project-40, the league allocated him to the Tampa Bay Mutiny. In 1998, he spent most of his time with the Project-40 team which competed in the A-League. However, he did have six games with the Mutiny that year. In 1999 and 2000, he became a regular with the Mutiny, starting 30 games and 22 games respectively.

McCarty broke his left ankle on April 7, 2001, in a game against the Dallas Burn. His rehabilitation took four months. On January 17, 2002, the Columbus Crew SC used the fifth pick in that season's waiver draft to select McCarty.

Columbus waived McCarty on March 2, 2004. When no club picked him up, McCarty retired from playing professionally.

== National and Olympic teams ==
He was a member of the U.S. U-20 national team at the 1997 U-20 World Cup. The U.S. made the second round only to fall to eventual tournament runner-up Uruguay. By the end of 1997, he had earned 13 caps with the U-20 team. The following year, he moved up to the U-23 national team. He became a regular on the team before breaking his right ankle on March 25, 1998.

McCarty earned his only cap with the senior U.S. team in a September 8, 1999 tie with Jamaica.

In 2000, McCarty was selected for the U.S. Olympic Team which competed at the 2000 Summer Olympics in Sydney, Australia. That team, coached by Clive Charles, went to the Bronze Medal match where it fell 2–0 to Chile. McCarty was the team captain for the Olympics.

== Managerial career ==
After retiring from playing, McCarty joined the youth coaching ranks with the California Odyssey of the Super Y-League. Since leaving the Odyssey, he is now coaching the High School Boy's Varsity team at Clovis North Educational Center and the Men's Soccer team at Clovis Community College .

== Honors ==
=== Club ===
Columbus Crew SC

- Lamar Hunt U.S. Open Cup: 2002
