= Diego Walsh =

Brazilian footballer (born 1979)

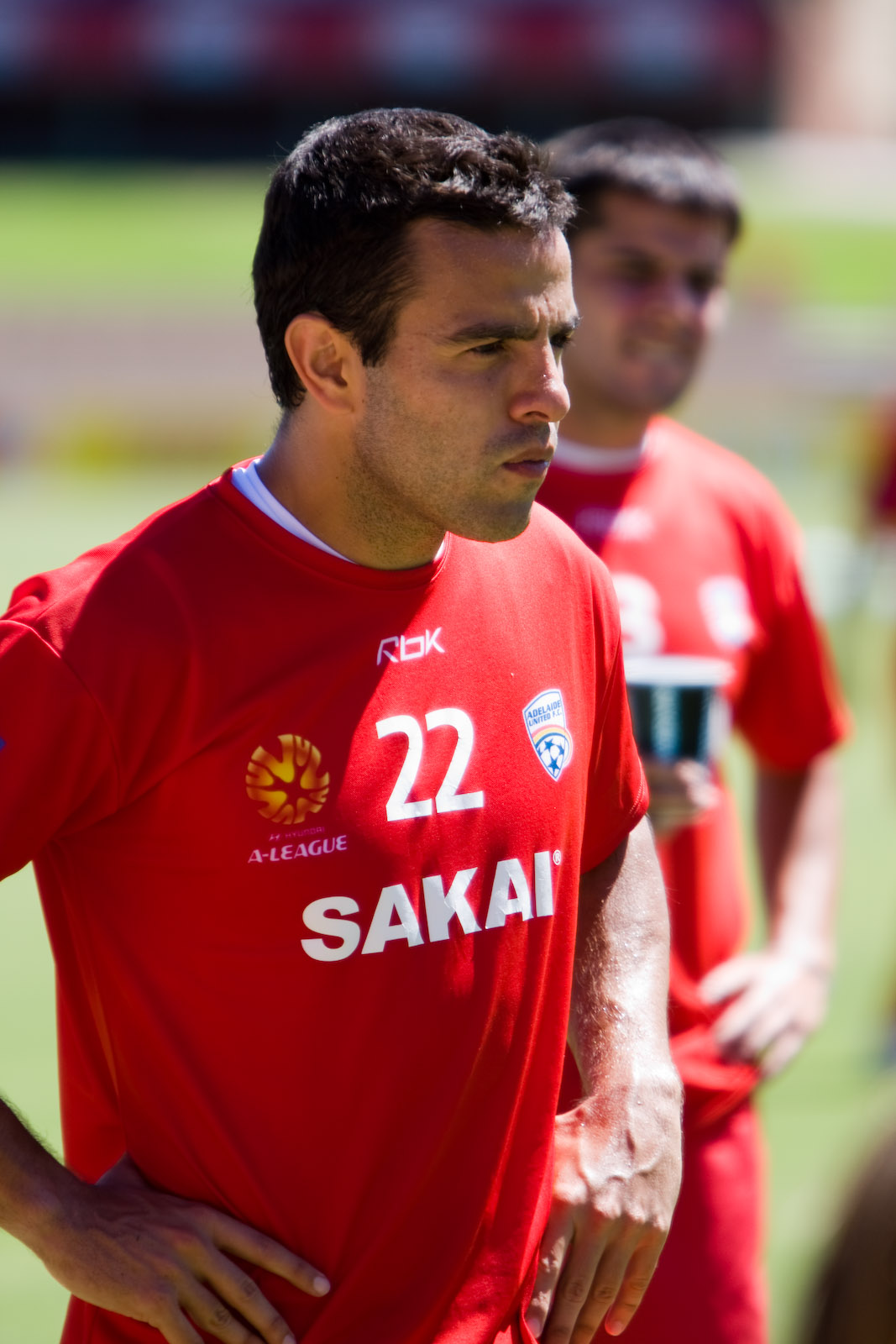

Personal information
- Full name: Diego Costa Bastos Walsh
- Date of birth: 8 December 1979 (age 46)
- Place of birth: Santos, Brazil
- Height: 1.83 m (6 ft 0 in)
- Position: Midfielder

Youth career
- 1999–2002: SMU Mustangs

Senior career*
Years	Team	Apps	(Gls)
2003	Columbus Crew	14	(1)
2004–2005	Kansas City Wizards	16	(0)
2006	Real Salt Lake	0	(0)
2006	Miami FC	22	(5)
2006–2009	Adelaide United	30	(1)
2010–2011	Wellington Phoenix	12	(0)
2011	Charleston Battery	5	(0)
2011–2012	TOT S.C.	27	(9)
Total		126	(16)
- * Club domestic league appearances and goals

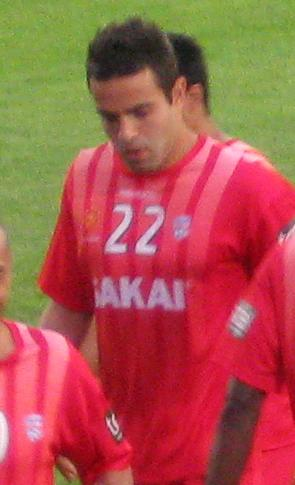
Diego warming up before the A-League match against the Newcastle Jets

Diego Costa Bastos Walsh (born 8 December 1979) is a Brazilian footballer who last played for TOT S.C. in the Thai Premier League.

== Career ==
=== Youth and college ===
While growing up in Brazil, Diego played in the youth system of Santos FC, before moving to Miami, Florida at the age of 14. He played club soccer for Miami Strike Force, and was a major part of a talented team which won 5 consecutive state championships, 2 regional championships, and finished second in the National Championship.

Diego turned down numerous other university scholarships to play four years of college soccer for Southern Methodist University, from 1999 to 2002, on a full scholarship. In both his junior and senior years, Diego was a NSCAA first team All-American. He is also currently SMU's all-time leader in assists, with 39, and ranks fifth in goals, also with 39. He was later named in the NSCAA "Team of the Decade," in 2010.

=== Professional ===
Upon graduating, Diego was drafted seventh overall in the 2003 MLS SuperDraft by the Columbus Crew. Walsh did not garner much time with the Crew, although playing extremely well when he was given the opportunity earning Columbus Crew Goal of the Year for 2003. He was traded at the end of the season to the Kansas City Wizards.

Although Diego started the season with a starting role in the Wizards' offense because of an injury to Preki, Diego did not fit into the Kansas City style of play. He was released by Kansas City Wizards during the 2005 season. After a brief stint with Real Salt Lake in the 2006 pre-season, he was released again, and played for Miami FC along with Brazilian superstar Romario where the pair helped the team make it to the USL playoffs in its first year in the league.

Diego joined Adelaide United in the Australian A-League during the 2006/2007 season after impressive displays during two Miami FC friendlies in Adelaide, which were organised by former Adelaide United chairman Mel Patzwald who facilitated both the Romario transfer as well as the sister relationship between both clubs and was instrumental in the Adelaide United Brazilian connection. which also netted United former World Player of the Year Romario. Diego was recommended to Adelaide by Romario himself, who regarded him highly as a player.

He debuted impressively against Sydney FC on 14 January 2007, with an assist to Fernando for an 88th-minute winner. During his second season with Adelaide United, he established himself as an excellent defensive and central midfielder, not only for Adelaide but in the whole A-League, and was regarded by his teammates as the outstanding player of the 2008 Asian Champions League campaign. He was the team's top goal scorer with 4 goals helping Adelaide United reach the 2008 Asian Champions League final for the first time. Adelaide United ended up losing the final to Gamba Osaka of Japan.

In a shock decision for Adelaide fans, Diego was released by the club on 20 January 2009. Adelaide coach Aurelio Vidmar cited Diego's 19 starts out of a possible 41 in two seasons, as a key factor in the decision. "He missed 50 per cent of the games due to injury – hamstrings, quads and back," said Vidmar. He was signed up by the Wellington Phoenix, on a two-year contract and became a firm favorite with the Wellington Phoenix supporter's group Yellow Fever.

On 20 May 2011 it was announced that he had signed a temporary contract with Charleston Battery. On 6 July 2011 it was announced in the Thai media that Diego had taken up a contract with Thai Premier League team TOT S.C.

He is currently an assistant coach at NCAA D1 program Grand Canyon University.

== A-League career statistics ==
All-Time Club Performances
Club	Season	A-League		Finals Series		Asia		Total
Club	Season	App	Goals	App	Goals	App	Goals	App	Goals
Adelaide United (A-League)	2006–07	6	0					6	0
Adelaide United (A-League)	2007–08	16	1					16	1
Adelaide United (A-League)	2008–09	8	0	1	0	13	4	22	4
Adelaide United (A-League)	Club Total	30	1	1	0	13	4	44	5
Club	Season	A-League		Finals Series		Asia		Total
Club	Season	App	Goals	App	Goals	App	Goals	App	Goals
Wellington Phoenix F.C. (A-League)	2009–10	12	0	1	0			13	0
Wellington Phoenix F.C. (A-League)	2010–11	0	0	0	0			0	0
Wellington Phoenix F.C. (A-League)	Club Total	12	0	1	0			13	0
Career totals		42	1	2	0	13	4	57	5
Last updated 21 February 2011
