= Ryan Mack =

American soccer midfielder (born 1979)

Personal information
- Full name: Gary Ryan
- Date of birth: November 13, 1979 (age 46)
- Place of birth: Birmingham, Michigan
- Height: 5 ft 9 in (1.75 m)
- Position: Midfielder

College career
Years	Team	Apps	(Gls)
1998–2002	Indiana Hoosiers		

Senior career*
Years	Team	Apps	(Gls)
2003	Chicago Fire	0	(0)
2004	Syracuse Salty Dogs	17	(0)
2004–2005	San Diego Sockers (indoor)	10	(6)
2006	Virginia Beach Mariners	27	(1)
2006–2009	Detroit Ignition (indoor)	56	(44)
2009–2011	Milwaukee Wave (indoor)	32	(13)
2011–2012	Detroit Waza (indoor)	14	(17)
2012–2013	Syracuse Silver Knights (indoor)	15	(0)
- * Club domestic league appearances and goals

Gary "Ryan" Mack (born November 13, 1979, in Birmingham, Michigan) is an American soccer midfielder who played for the Syracuse Silver Knights of the MISL.

== Youth ==
Mack was the Michigan High School Player of the Year as a soccer player at Seaholm High School. He attended Indiana University where he played on the men's soccer team from 1998 to 2002. In 1998 and 1999, the Hoosiers won the NCAA Men's Soccer Championship. He was a 2000 third team All American, but missed the 2001 season with a torn anterior cruciate ligament, returning for a final season in 2002.

== Professional ==
On January 17, 2003, the Chicago Fire selected Mack in the third round (25th overall) in the 2003 MLS SuperDraft. In 2004, he played for the Syracuse Salty Dogs of the USL A-League. Mack played for the San Diego Sockers during the 2004-2005 Major Indoor Soccer League season. The Sockers folded mid-season. He then played for the Virginia Beach Mariners during the 2006 USL-1 season. On October 5, 2006, the expansion Detroit Ignition of Major Indoor Soccer League signed Mack for the team's first season. The Ignition had selected Mack with the 12th pick in the 2006 MISL Expansion Draft. He played for the Ignition until they folded in 2009. That fall, Mack moved to the Milwaukee Wave where he spent two seasons. In November 2011, he signed with the Detroit Waza of the Professional Arena Soccer League. In 2012, he returned to Syracuse and signed for the MISL side the Syracuse Silver Knights.
