= Bobby Convey =

American soccer player

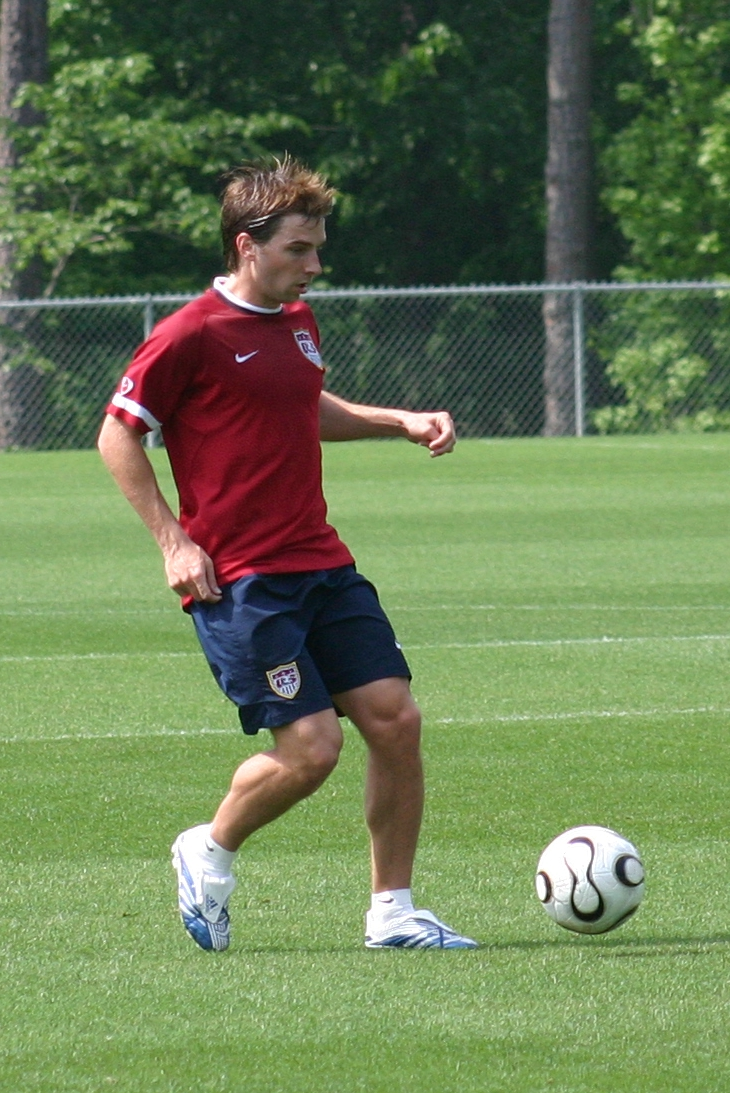
- Convey training with the United States Men's National Team

Personal information
- Full name: Robert Francis Convey
- Date of birth: May 27, 1983 (age 43)
- Place of birth: Philadelphia, Pennsylvania, United States
- Height: 5 ft 9 in (1.75 m)
- Position: Left winger

Youth career
- 1999–2000: IMG Soccer Academy

Senior career*
Years	Team	Apps	(Gls)
2000–2004	D.C. United	89	(8)
2000	→ MLS Pro-40 (loan)	2	(1)
2004–2009	Reading	98	(7)
2009–2011	San Jose Earthquakes	75	(3)
2012–2013	Sporting Kansas City	19	(1)
2013	Toronto FC	21	(1)
2014	New York Red Bulls	13	(0)
Total		317	(21)

International career^{‡}
1999	United States U17	6	(0)
2001–2003	United States U20	9	(2)
2000–2008	United States	46	(1)
Medal record
Representing United States
Third place	CONCACAF Gold Cup	2003
Men's Soccer
- * Club domestic league appearances and goals as of 7 December 2014 (UTC) ‡ National team caps and goals as of December 7, 2014

Robert Francis Convey (/ˈkɒnvi/; born May 27, 1983) is an American former professional soccer player who played as a left winger. His career included spells at several Major League Soccer clubs, where he won the MLS Comeback Player of the Year Award in 2010, and five years in England with Reading, whom he helped gain promotion to the Premier League for the first time. He played in 46 international matches for the United States, and made their squads for the 2003 Gold Cup and 2006 World Cup.

== Career ==
=== Youth ===
Convey attended the William Penn Charter School in Philadelphia and played club soccer for the Philadelphia Soccer Club Coppa. He was a member of the initial class of the Bradenton Academy that also included current and former national team members Landon Donovan, Oguchi Onyewu and DaMarcus Beasley. Together they helped lead the Under-17 squad to a fourth-place finish in the 1999 U-17 World Cup in New Zealand.

=== Professional ===
==== D.C. United ====
Convey was drafted in 2000 in the first round by D.C. United of Major League Soccer. That year, he became the youngest player ever signed by MLS. Convey was originally slated to play the majority of the season with the Project-40 squad; however, as United faltered he was called upon to step in and perform almost immediately. He played 22 games for United in 2000, starting 18 of those. Convey entered his first game in United's 4–0 loss to Los Angeles Galaxy in the home opener at Robert F. Kennedy Memorial Stadium on March 25, 2000, and was awarded his first start in United's 2–1 loss at the Columbus Crew on May 3, 2000. It was not until July 4, 2000, against the Colorado Rapids that Convey served up Raúl Díaz Arce at the far post for a header past a helpless David Kramer. The teenager also was impressive against English Premier League side Newcastle United, when the Magpies visited D.C. during a pre-season training stint in the U.S. Convey's two assists and high work rate during that friendly were enough to draw the attention of Newcastle's famed manager Bobby Robson. In four and a half seasons in MLS, Convey finished with eight goals and 16 assists.

==== Reading ====
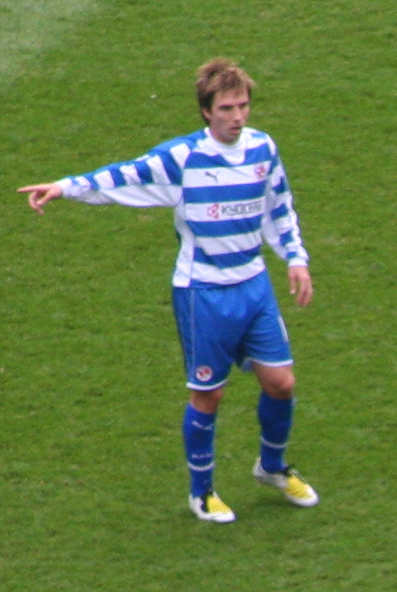
Convey playing for Reading against Arsenal

Convey looked set to move to Tottenham Hotspur of the Premier League in the summer of 2003, when the London club agreed to a $3 million move with MLS, but the transfer stalled when his work permit application was denied due to his lack of appearances with the senior national team. Then, on July 22, 2004, after five seasons with D.C. United, Convey signed a three-year contract with Reading, who were then playing in the Championship. His transfer fee was around £900,000, the highest paid by Reading up to that date.

Convey made his debut for his new club in a 1–0 loss away to West Ham United, coming on as a substitute. He made his first start a few days later during a 1–0 Reading victory over Sheffield United on August 14, 2004. However, the start of his career in England lacked distinction, as Convey made only seven starts and 15 substitute appearances during the 2004–05 season.

Convey entered the 2005–06 season in much better form, with a starting place in the team, and he helped the Royals win the Championship title setting a new English record of 106 points in 46 games to gain promotion to the Premier League for the 2006–07 season. Convey's first goals for the club came during a 5–0 victory over Millwall.

Convey's first season in the Premier League started with Reading's 3–2 win over Middlesbrough on August 19, 2006. However, Convey missed much of the remainder of the season following a training ground injury in October 2006 and subsequent knee operations.

He returned from injury on July 28, 2007, playing the first half in a pre-season friendly match against Brighton, appearing "comfortable and in good shape", according to the team's match report. He returned to competitive football for Reading in the club's 1–0 victory over Everton on August 18, 2007.

On February 6, 2009, Convey and Reading reached a mutual agreement on Convey's release from the club.

==== San Jose Earthquakes ====
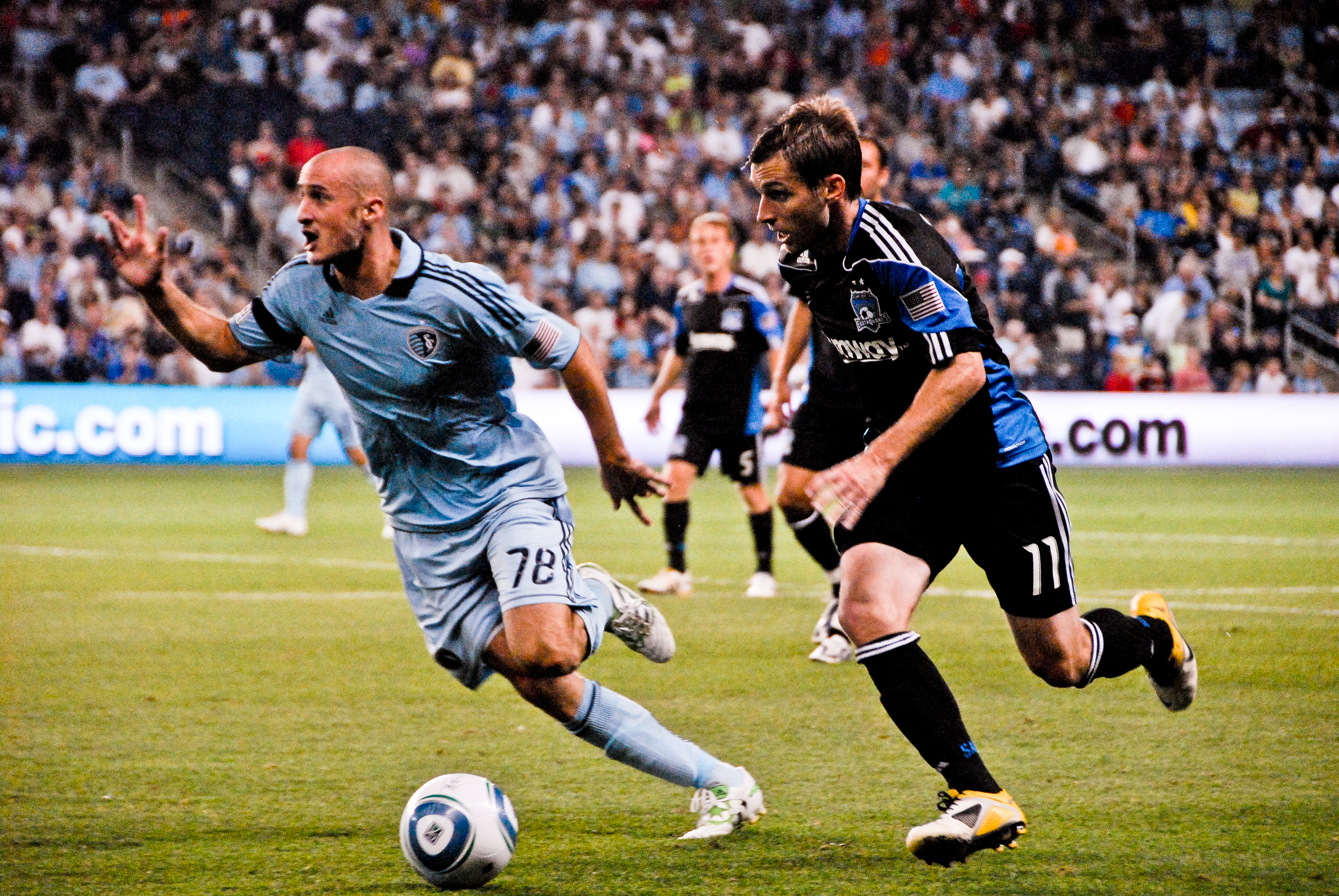
Convey playing for the San Jose Earthquakes

Four days after being released by Reading, Convey returned to MLS, signing with the San Jose Earthquakes. He scored his first goal for the Quakes on April 11, 2009, against the Chicago Fire, while playing left-back. In 2010, Convey recorded 10 assists and was given the MLS Comeback Player of the Year Award. After a fractious relationship with manager Frank Yallop, it was announced that Convey would not be returning to San Jose for the 2012 season. In his three seasons at the club, Convey appeared in 75 league matches and scored three goals.

==== Sporting Kansas City ====
On December 2, 2011, Sporting Kansas City announced that it had acquired Convey in exchange for use of an international roster slot during the 2012 season. In 2012, Convey started 14 games, scoring one goal and providing two assists before suffering a series of injuries. He made a total of 20 MLS appearances for the club, recording one goal and two assists.

==== Toronto FC ====
On May 16, 2013, Toronto FC announced that it had acquired Convey from Sporting KC in exchange for a third round pick in the 2014 MLS SuperDraft. In his only season in Toronto Convey appeared in 21 matches and tallied 1 goal and 4 assists.

==== New York Red Bulls ====
On December 13, 2013, Convey was traded to New York along with a 2014 MLS SuperDraft second-round pick in exchange for a 2014 MLS SuperDraft first-round pick and a 2016 MLS SuperDraft third-round pick.

After an injury-plagued 2014 season, Convey's 2015 contract option was declined by New York on December 2, 2014.

Convey subsequently retired without making an announcement, but in 2017, he claimed that he was suffering from Asthma attacks, which left him fighting for his life. On his Instagram account, he posted: "I retired from soccer and didn't really talk about it as it was just kind of forced upon me and extremely depressing at times...I have had 2 separate surgeries and 4 separate hospitalizations since I retired 2 seasons ago...This morning I was almost unconscious being physically carried out of my house to the ambulance by four firefighters to the hospital where they cut my clothes off to administer four breathing treatments and three separate steroid injections as my airways were completely closed up...The doctor said I was way too close this time."

=== International ===
Convey received his first cap for the senior United States team on October 25, 2000, against Mexico, becoming the third-youngest player in U.S. soccer history to do so. Convey captained the under-20 team at the 2003 FIFA World Youth Championship in the United Arab Emirates. He was named to the 23-man squad for the 2006 FIFA World Cup in Germany, wearing number 15. It was his slicing free kick that resulted in the own goal against Italy which settled the outcome of the 1–1 draw. He and teammate Marcus Hahnemann were the first Reading players to play in the World Cup. He played in all three games as the United States exited in the first round. Convey earned 46 caps and scored one goal for the United States national team from 2000 to 2008.

==== International goals ====
Goal	Date	Venue	Opponent	Score	Result	Competition
1	July 26, 2003	Miami, Florida	Costa Rica	3–2	3–2	2003 CONCACAF Gold Cup

== Personal life ==
Convey is partially blind in his left eye due to optic nerve damage.

== Career statistics ==
Club	Season	League			Cup		League Cup		Other^{1}		Total	
Club	Season	Division	Apps	Goals	Apps	Goals	Apps	Goals	Apps	Goals	Apps	Goals
D.C. United	2000	MLS	22	0	2	0	—				24	0
D.C. United	2001	MLS	12	1	1	0	—				13	1
D.C. United	2002	MLS	26	5	0	0	—				26	5
D.C. United	2003	MLS	19	2	1	0	—		2	0	22	2
D.C. United	2004	MLS	10	0	0	0	—				10	0
D.C. United totals			89	8	4	0	—		2	0	95	8
Reading	2004–05	Championship	18	0	2	0	2	0	—		22	0
Reading	2005–06	Championship	45	7	0	0	0	0	—		45	7
Reading	2006–07	Premier League	9	0	3	0	0	0	—		12	0
Reading	2007–08	Premier League	20	0	2	0	2	1	—		24	1
Reading	2008–09	Championship	6	0	1	0	2	0	—		9	0
Reading F.C. totals			98	7	8	0	6	1	—		112	8
San Jose Earthquakes	2009	MLS	26	1	1	0	—				27	1
San Jose Earthquakes	2010	MLS	28	1	1	0	—		3	2	32	3
San Jose Earthquakes	2011	MLS	21	1	0	0	—				21	1
San Jose Earthquakes totals			75	3	2	0	—		3	2	80	5
Sporting Kansas City	2012	MLS	16	1	0	0	—		1	0	17	1
Sporting Kansas City	2013	MLS	3	0	0	0	—				3	0
Sporting Kansas City totals			19	1	0	0	—		1	0	20	1
Toronto FC	2013	MLS	21	1	0	0	—				21	0
New York Red Bulls	2014	MLS	13	0	1	0	—				14	0
Career totals			315	20	15	0	6	1	6	2	342	23

- 1.Includes MLS Cup playoffs

== Honors ==
Reading

- Football League Championship: 2005–06

Sporting Kansas City

- Lamar Hunt U.S. Open Cup: 2012

Individual

- CONCACAF Gold Cup Best XI (Reserves): 2003
- MLS Comeback Player of the Year Award: 2010
