= Chris Leitch =

American soccer player

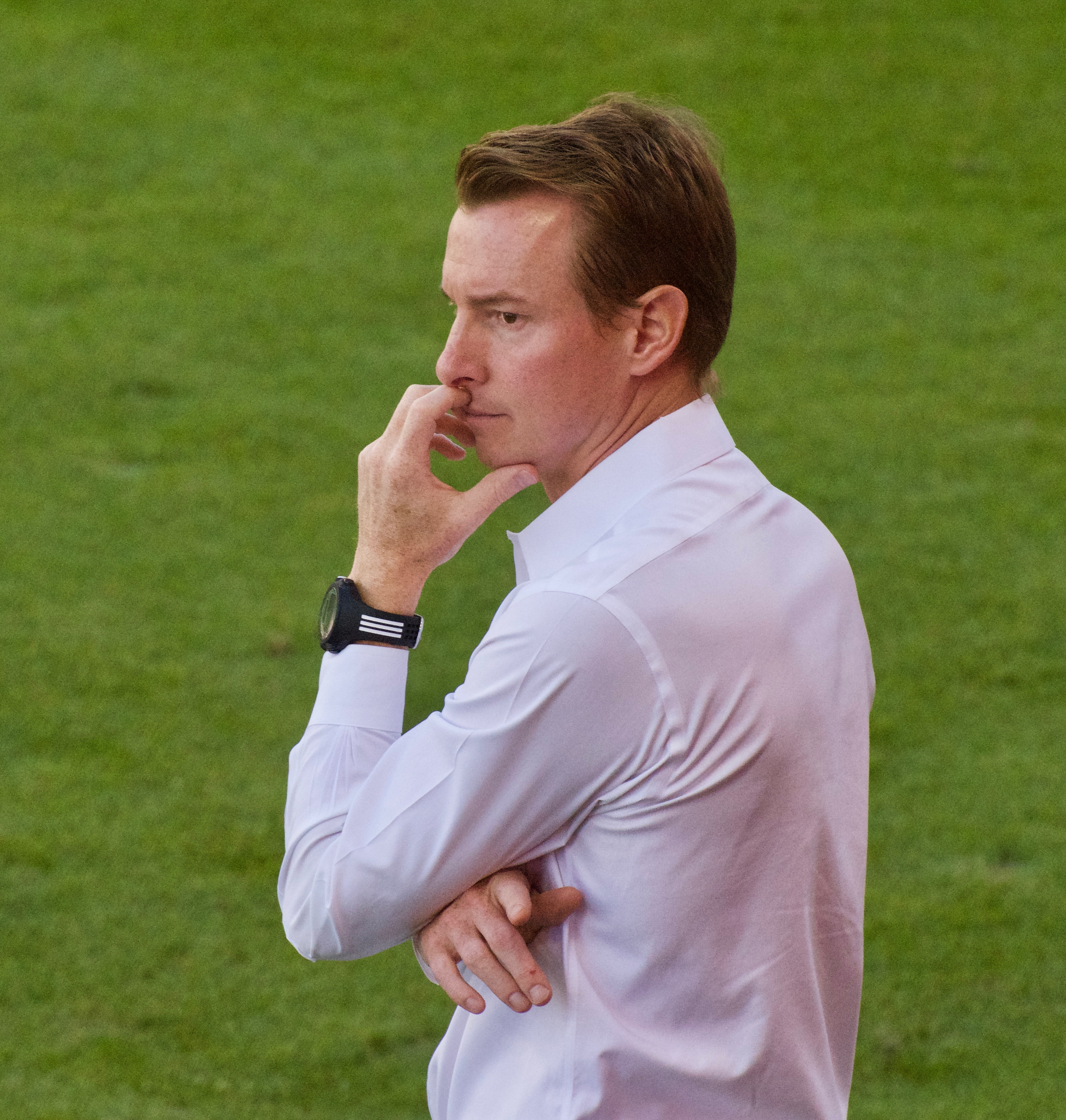
- Leitch in 2017

Personal information
- Date of birth: April 1, 1979 (age 47)
- Place of birth: Pickerington, Ohio, United States
- Height: 5 ft 11 in (1.80 m)
- Position: Defender

College career
Years	Team	Apps	(Gls)
1997–2001	North Carolina	88	(0)

Senior career*
Years	Team	Apps	(Gls)
2002	Columbus Crew	13	(0)
2002–2005	MetroStars	72	(0)
2006	Columbus Crew	24	(0)
2007–2008	New York Red Bulls	29	(0)
2009–2011	San Jose Earthquakes	58	(0)
Total		196	(0)

Managerial career
- 2017: San Jose Earthquakes
- 2021–2025: San Jose Earthquakes (general manager)
- * Club domestic league appearances and goals as of August 12, 2011

Chris Leitch (born April 1, 1979) is a former American soccer player, head coach, and general manager for the San Jose Earthquakes.

== Career ==
=== College ===
Leitch played college soccer at the University of North Carolina, leading them to the NCAA Championship in 2001, setting a school record for games played (88) and starts (87).

=== Professional ===
Leitch was drafted by Columbus Crew in the fourth round of the 2002 MLS SuperDraft, but only played 13 games for his hometown team in his first professional season.

Leitch was traded to the MetroStars with Jeff Matteo for Ross Paule prior to the 2003 season. He became a regular in the Metro lineup late in the year, playing in 15 games. He then became an automatic starter in 2004, playing every minute of all but a single game. Originally a right back, Leitch acquitted himself well on the left flank when the Metros needed help at that position. He switched back to the right flank in 2005. Despite being named the team's Defender of the Year, he was waived by the club in the offseason and then came back to Columbus. He appeared in 24 matches in the 2006 season for his hometown club.

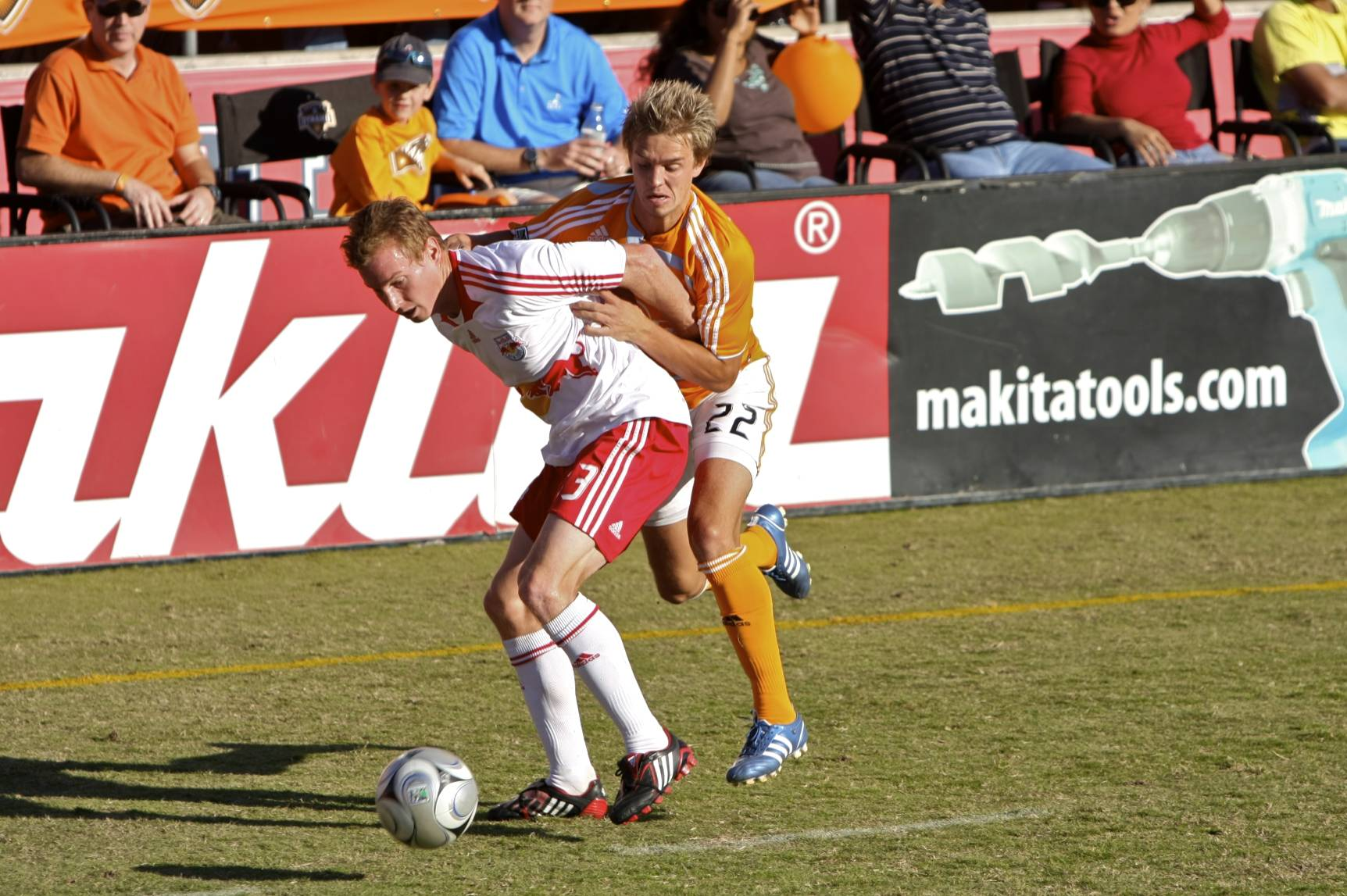
Leitch matching up with Stuart Holden

In the 2007 pre-season, Leitch was waived again, this time by the Crew as they sought to clear roster spots. He would return to the New York franchise, now New York Red Bulls, in July. The versatile defender appeared in 12 league matches for the club, starting 11. In 2008 Leitch appeared in 17 regular season matches. He helped the club reach the 2008 Western Conference Final, starting in both matches of the Red Bulls historic upset over defending champion Houston Dynamo (4–1 on aggregate). The following week he helped shut out Real Salt Lake 1–0 to help the Red Bulls reach the MLS Cup Final for the first time in club history.

Just prior to the start of the 2009 season on March 2, San Jose Earthquakes acquired Leitch in a trade with New York for an undisclosed sum of allocation money and one of the Earthquakes' eight international roster spots. Leitch had a career year with San Jose in 2009 appearing in 29 matches during the MLS regular season and contributing with 7 assists from his full back position.

Leitch remained with San Jose through the 2011 season. At season's end, the club declined his 2012 contract option and he entered the 2011 MLS Re-Entry Draft. Leitch was selected by Los Angeles Galaxy in stage two of the draft on December 12, 2011. However, Leitch decided to retire rather than return for the 2012 season.

=== Coaching ===
On January 31, 2012, Leitch was named Technical Director for the San Jose Earthquakes Youth Development Academy.

On August 10, 2015, he was promoted to Technical Director for the San Jose Earthquakes proper, including the first team as well as the academy.

On June 25, 2017, he was named the head coach of the Earthquakes, replacing Dominic Kinnear. His coaching debut was San Jose's 2–1 victory over Seattle Sounders FC in the knockout round of the U.S. Open Cup on June 28, advancing the Earthquakes to the quarterfinals for the first time since 2012 while also achieving the team's first-ever victory over another MLS team during the Open Cup. Leitch's first MLS match as head coach saw San Jose beat the LA Galaxy 2–1 at Stanford Stadium on July 1 off of a stoppage time winner from Shea Salinas.

He was replaced as San Jose's head coach by Mikael Stahre on November 24, 2017, and thereafter returned to his former role as technical director.

On November 8, 2021, he was promoted from technical director to general manager of the San Jose Earthquakes.

After 17 years with the team, the Earthquakes would announce the departure of Leitch from the organization on November 14, 2025.

== Titles ==
Season	Team	Title
2002	Columbus Crew	U.S. Open Cup
2008	New York Red Bulls	MLS Western Conference (Playoffs)

== Career statistics ==
=== Player ===
Club performance			League		Cup		League Cup		Continental		Total	
Season	Club	League	Apps	Goals	Apps	Goals	Apps	Goals	Apps	Goals	Apps	Goals
United States			League		Open Cup		League Cup		North America		Total	
2002	Columbus Crew	Major League Soccer	13	0	2	0	-	-	-	-	15	0
2003	MetroStars	Major League Soccer	15	0	3	0	2	0	-	-	20	0
2004	MetroStars	Major League Soccer	29	0	1	0	2	0	-	-	32	0
2005	MetroStars	Major League Soccer	28	0	1	0	-	-	-	-	29	0
2006	Columbus Crew	Major League Soccer	24	0	2	0	-	-	-	-	26	0
2007	New York Red Bulls	Major League Soccer	12	0	-	-	1	0	-	-	13	0
2008	New York Red Bulls	Major League Soccer	17	0	1	0	4	0	-	-	22	0
2009	San Jose Earthquakes	Major League Soccer	29	0	1	0	-	-	-	-	30	0
2010	San Jose Earthquakes	Major League Soccer	15	0	1	1	1	0	-	-	17	1
2011	San Jose Earthquakes	Major League Soccer	14	0	-	-	-	-	-	-	14	0
Total	United States		196	0	12	1	10	0	-	-	218	1
Career total			196	0	12	1	10	0	-	-	218	1

=== Manager ===
Team	Nat	From	To	Record				
Team	Nat	From	To	G	W	D	L	Win %
San Jose Earthquakes	(United States)	2017	2017	17	7	2	8	41.18
Total				17	7	2	8	41.18

As of November 26, 2017
