= Eric Denton (soccer) =

American soccer player (born 1978)

Personal information
- Full name: Eric Denton
- Date of birth: February 8, 1978 (age 48)
- Place of birth: Falls Church, Virginia, United States
- Height: 5 ft 9 in (1.75 m)
- Position: Defender

Youth career
- 1996–1999: Santa Clara Broncos

Senior career*
Years	Team	Apps	(Gls)
2000–2001	D.C. United	27	(1)
2000	→ MLS Pro-40 (loan)	3	(0)
2001	Tampa Bay Mutiny	13	(0)
2002–2004	Columbus Crew	67	(3)
2005–2006	Colorado Rapids	53	(1)
2007	New York Red Bulls	0	(0)
2008–2009	San Jose Earthquakes	37	(0)

International career^{‡}
2000	United States U23	2	(0)
- * Club domestic league appearances and goals as of 26 October 2009 ‡ National team caps and goals as of 30 July 2014

Eric Denton (born February 8, 1978, in Falls Church, Virginia) is an American former professional soccer player.

== Career ==
=== College ===
Denton played college soccer at Santa Clara University from 1996 to 1999, playing in a total of 83 matches, and registering 7 goals and 14 assists. In his senior season, Denton lead the Broncos to the College Cup, where the team lost to Indiana University; he was also named a first-team All-American.

=== Professional ===
Upon graduating, Denton was selected 19th overall in the 2000 MLS SuperDraft by D.C. United. Denton earned a spot on the squad, starting 12 games as a rookie. Although he began the 2001 as a starter for the team, he was traded in the middle of the year to the Tampa Bay Mutiny in exchange for Scott Vermillion. Denton played briefly for the Mutiny, but the team was contracted at the end of 2001. Upon Tampa Bay's contraction, Denton was selected by the Columbus Crew in the 2002 MLS Dispersal Draft.

Denton was immediately a starter at left back for the Crew, appearing in 23 games, and adding one goal and four assists. He did much the same in 2003, playing in 26 games, scoring two goals and one assist. Although he began the 2004 season as a starter, he was supplanted in the middle of the year by rookie Chris Wingert, and ended the season with only 18 appearances. The Crew cut Denton after the season, and he signed with the Colorado Rapids. Following the 2006 season, Denton was waived by the Colorado Rapids. The New York Red Bulls picked up Denton via the waiver draft only to release him in March 2007.

Denton signed to Major League Soccer expansion side San Jose Earthquakes on its return to the league for the 2008 season, but was later waived on June 25, 2009.

== Honors ==
=== Club ===
Columbus Crew SC

- Lamar Hunt U.S. Open Cup: 2002
- MLS Supporters' Shield: 2004
