= Bret Jones =

American soccer player (born 1980)

Personal information
- Full name: Bret Eric Jones
- Date of birth: December 8, 1980 (age 45)
- Place of birth: Xenia, Ohio, United States
- Height: 5 ft 9 in (1.75 m)
- Position: Forward

Youth career
- 1999–2002: Wright State Raiders

Senior career*
Years	Team	Apps	(Gls)
2002	Dayton Gemini		
2003	Columbus Shooting Stars	12	(0)
2005–2006	Cincinnati Kings	26	(1)
2008–2009	1790 Cincinnati (indoor)		
2010–2012	Dayton Dutch Lions	46	(2)
- * Club domestic league appearances and goals as of February 14, 2014

Bret Jones (born December 8, 1980) is an American former soccer player.

== Career ==
=== Youth and amateur ===
Jones attended Xenia High School and played college soccer at Wright State University from 1999 to 2001, being named to the All-Horizon League team as a senior. He subsequently played with Dayton Gemini and the Columbus Shooting Stars in the USL Premier Development League.

=== Professional ===
Jones turned professional in 2005 when he signed with the expansion franchise Cincinnati Kings in the USL Second Division. He made his professional debut on June 11, 2005, in a 0–0 tie with the Wilmington Hammerheads, and went on to play 11 games and score 1 goal in his debut season.

After a brief period playing professional indoor soccer with 1790 Cincinnati, and training with the Columbus Crew reserves, Jones signed with the Dayton Dutch Lions in the USL Premier Development League in 2010, scoring 2 goals in 10 games during the team's debut season. He continued with the team in 2011 when the team self-promoted to the USL Professional Division in 2011.
