= 2007–08 Reading F.C. season =

Reading
2007–08 season
- Chairman: John Madejski
- Manager: Steve Coppell
- Stadium: Madejski Stadium
- Premier League: 18th (relegated)
- FA Cup: Third round vs Tottenham Hotspur
- League Cup: Third round vs Liverpool
- Top goalscorer: League: Dave Kitson (10); All: Dave Kitson (10)
- Highest home attendance: 24,135 vs Manchester United (19 January 2008)
- Lowest home attendance: 21,379 vs Wigan Athletic (22 September 2007)
- Average home league attendance: 23,467 (3 May 2008)
Home colours	Away colours	Third colours

The 2007–08 Reading F.C. season was only the second top-flight campaign in the club's history. The team suffered an extremely poor run of form in January and February 2008, losing a club-record eight league games in a row. The club was relegated on the final day of the season after Fulham's victory at Portsmouth saw Reading finish in 18th place.

== Review and events ==
=== Pre-season ===
Reading travelled to South Korea to play in the 2007 Peace Cup. Reading lost to River Plate, won against Lyon and Shimizu S-Pulse, and came second in Group B on goal difference.

In Didcot, a Reading XI won 2–0, followed by a 6–1 hammering of Brentford. Reading went away to Brighton & Hove Albion and won 3–1, then a Reading XI drew 1–1 at a rescheduled game at Tooting & Mitcham United. Reading's final pre-season game was against Wolverhampton Wanderers at Molineux, which Reading won 3–2.

=== August ===
A tough start to the Premier League season saw Reading travel to Old Trafford to play Manchester United. Reading secured a creditable 0–0 draw, despite losing Dave Kitson to a red card just seconds after the player had entered the game as a substitute; Kitson was dismissed for a lunge on Patrice Evra.

Reading's first home game of the season was a midweek fixture against reigning Premier League champions Chelsea. Reading dominated the first half and led at half-time through André Bikey's first goal for the club, smashed home after Petr Čech and Steve Sidwell collided in the Chelsea penalty area. Chelsea scored two quick goals, however, in the second half, to win the game 2–1, and Reading again had a player sent off, Kalifa Cissé, this time for two yellow cards.

The following Saturday, Reading gained a badly needed win against Everton. Stephen Hunt converted from a looping throw-in in the first-half, and Reading secured a 1–0 victory. In their final league fixture of the month, an injury-hit Reading, without Nicky Shorey and Graeme Murty in defence, lost 3–0 at Bolton Wanderers.

On 28 August, Reading began their League Cup campaign with a 1–0 victory away to League One Swansea City. Reading again played some of the match with only ten men, after Sam Sodje was red-carded in the 58th minute, but Leroy Lita struck the winning goal in extra-time, converting a Dave Kitson cross.

=== September ===
Reading fans could have been forgiven for expecting a victory from the opening league fixture in the month at home to West Ham United, having won last season's corresponding fixture 6–0. Two goals from Matthew Etherington, however, helped West Ham to a 3–0 victory, as Reading's defence continued to struggle. Another defeat followed at newly promoted Sunderland, Dave Kitson scoring a late consolation from a Nicky Shorey cross, as Sunderland won 2–1.

Reading returned to winning ways on 22 September, and moved out of the relegation places with a 2–1 home victory over Wigan Athletic, Dave Kitson becoming the first Royal to score multiple times in the season, and James Harper with a late winner. The next league match was an away loss to Portsmouth in an 11-goal thriller, the highest goal scoring game in the history of the Premier League to date. While the two sides were equal at 2–2 early in the second half, Pompey went on to a decisive 7–4 victory. Benjani scored a hat-trick for the home squad in this wild match, which included a missed penalty by Nicky Shorey and scoring by Dave Kitson, Liam Rosinor, Shane Long and Nicky Shorey (later given as a Sol Campbell own goal).

Again, Reading played one cup fixture in the month. Despite a spirited showing by a number of reserves, they lost 4–2 to Liverpool at home in the Carling Cup third round, with Fernando Torres scoring a hat-trick. John Halls and Bobby Convey scored Reading's goals.

=== October ===
Reading began the month with a home game against Derby County on 7 October. In what proved to be a scrappy affair, Reading came out with a 1–0 victory through a Kevin Doyle goal; Derby did not manage a shot on target the whole game.

Next followed an away game against Blackburn Rovers on 20 October after the international break. Reading's defensive frailties away from home showed once again as they went down 4–2. Kevin Doyle netted twice after coming on as a substitute while Benni McCarthy scored twice with Roque Santa Cruz and Tugay Kerimoğlu getting the other two goals for Blackburn.

Reading finished October with a home game against Newcastle United. Reading took the lead courtesy of a 53rd minute Dave Kitson goal but a clumsy Michael Duberry own goal in the 76th minute looked to have rescued a point for the Magpies, however a moment of tactical brilliance by Steve Coppell resulted in the winning goal. Shane Long was brought on in the 84th minute to promptly score the winning goal on his second touch of the ball.

=== November ===
Following its victory over Newcastle, Reading travelled to Craven Cottage with hopes of a second consecutive league win for the first time in the season. A laboured performance, however, saw Fulham win the game 3–1, after Kevin Doyle's second-half equaliser had put the Royals back in it.

On 12 November, Reading hosted unbeaten Arsenal under the Madejski Stadium floodlights, and were soundly beaten 3–1, Nicky Shorey slotting home a late consolation after substitute Shane Long had headed against the bar. The result ended a run of three consecutive home victories, and cemented the five-point gap in the table between Newcastle in 11th (on 18 points), and Reading in 12th (on 13 points).

Reading rounded up November with an away trip to Manchester City, many saw this game as a certain victory for the home team considering both City's home record and Reading's away record. City took the lead thanks to an 11th-minute goal by Martin Petrov only to be cancelled out just before half time by a well struck James Harper goal in the 43rd minute. Reading looked set to earn a hard-fought point but their hopes were dashed by a 94th minute Stephen Ireland strike. This result was Reading's sixth consecutive away defeat as they remained winless on the road.

=== December ===
The month of December saw an improvement for Reading. They met Middlesbrough at home on 1 December; after an entirely forgettable first half, Dave Kitson gave Reading the lead, superbly lobbing Ross Turnbull. But with seven minutes remaining, Middlesbrough's Tuncay headed home Luke Young's cross for his first goal for Boro. The game concluded with a 1–1, just enough for Reading to stay out of the relegation zone.

8 December saw an impressive and unexpected win for Reading over Liverpool. With a controversial penalty after Jamie Carragher fouled Brynjar Gunnarsson in the corner of the box, Stephen Hunt put the ball into the back of the goal, with Pepe Reina not standing a chance. Steven Gerrard eventually equalised after many failed Liverpool attacks before and after from Fernando Torres. A free kick was eventually awarded to Reading following an unsuccessful tackle by Gerrard, which Nicky Shorey floated into the area, and Kevin Doyle headed in. James Harper scored a fine third and Reading, with the help of the post, kept the Reds at bay for the remainder of the match.

Following a 1–1 draw away to Birmingham City, in which Stephen Hunt earned Reading a point with his second goal from the penalty spot in two games. Reading scraped a controversial victory over Sunderland at the Madejski Stadium. Leading through an Ívar Ingimarsson goal, Reading conceded a penalty when Ibrahima Sonko appeared to trip Kenwyne Jones. In the final minute, Stephen Hunt poked a Shane Long cross towards goal, and Sunderland goalkeeper Craig Gordon appeared to palm the ball away. The assistant referee gave a goal, however, and Reading celebrated a 2–1 victory.

On Boxing Day, Reading travelled to West Ham, leaving Upton Park with a creditable 1–1 draw. Dave Kitson equalized Nolberto Solano's opener after Brynjar Gunnarsson had been sent off for a two-footed challenge on West Ham's Hayden Mullins.

Reading's final game of 2007 was against Tottenham Hotspur at White Hart Lane, where the teams threatened to eclipse the 11 goals in Reading's match at Portsmouth earlier in the season. Tottenham won the match 6–4, although Reading led three times in the second half with goals from Kalifa Cissé and Ívar Ingimarsson and two from Dave Kitson. Tottenham controversially regained the lead after Jermain Defoe headed home Robbie Keane's saved penalty, Defoe having been two yards inside the penalty area when the kick was taken.

=== January ===
2008 started badly for Reading, as Ibrahima Sonko was sent off after only four minutes of a home match against Portsmouth on 1 January, for fouling Benjani in the penalty area. Niko Kranjčar missed the resultant penalty, but Sol Campbell bundled the ball over the line a few minutes later after a mistake from Marcus Hahnemann. Reading failed to make much impact against Portsmouth after that, and the extra work-rate required due to being a man down showed in the second half when John Utaka outpaced Nicky Shorey for a second goal after 66 minutes to give the visitors a 2–0 victory.

Just a week after losing 6–4 to Tottenham Hotspur in the league, Reading had an opportunity to give a better account of themselves in a FA Cup Third Round match at White Hart Lane. Fielding effectively a reserve team, Reading earned a replay at Madejski Stadium through a 2–2 draw and another two goals for Stephen Hunt.

Reading returned to league action at Villa Park, and despite an injury to Michael Duberry, and the absence of Ibrahima Sonko and André Bikey to the African Cup of Nations, Steve Coppell opted to play Brynjar Gunnarsson in defence in first half, and Kalifa Cissé in the second half, despite the availability of reserves team captain Alex Pearce. Reading fell to a disappointing 3–1 defeat to Villa, James Harper scoring a late consolation goal for the Royals.

Soon Reading played Tottenham again in the third round replay at home. Robbie Keane scored the only goal as Tottenham Hotspur went to win 1–0 and go into the hat in the fourth round draw.

Next, Reading played Manchester United at the Madejski Stadium. Despite a spirited performance, Manchester United broke the deadlock on 77 minutes with a goal from Wayne Rooney. In injury time, Cristiano Ronaldo wrapped up the points after a second goal, condemning Reading to their fifth-straight defeat.

Reading then played Chelsea at Stamford Bridge. Chelsea dominated the match and took a deserved 1–0 lead on a 33rd-minute goal from Michael Ballack, despite numerous chances, that was the final score.

=== February ===
February started miserably for the Royals. First, they lost against fellow strugglers Bolton Wanderers at home 0–2 with the goals coming from Kevin Nolan and Heiðar Helguson. After a seventh-straight Premier League loss to Everton, Reading dropped into the relegation zone.

Reading went to Everton trying to get a win. Everton proved too strong and beat Reading 1–0 through a Phil Jagielka goal just after the hour mark.

Reading's next game was at home to Aston Villa. Shorey scored Reading's first goal in five matches in the 90th minute for the Royals, but it was all too late—Villa had scored two goals earlier on in the match through Ashley Young and Marlon Harewood, condemning Reading to 2–1 defeat.

=== March ===
March began well for Reading, making a complete turn-around. Their first match was against Middlesbrough at the Riverside, a hard-fought match that seeming looked to finish in a draw. In injury time, however, James Harper scored the winner, making the final score 1–0. The victory took Reading out of the relegation zone and into 14th place.

Reading beat Manchester City 2–0, at home, to make it six points out of six. Shane Long and substitute Dave Kitson scored for Reading.

Reading then travelled to Liverpool, going up 1–0 up after a screamer from Marek Matějovský. Liverpool, however, won the game 2–1 in the end. In their next game, Reading beat Birmingham 2–1, as Bikey scored both goals for Reading, making Mauro Zárate's equaliser trivial. Reading then drew against Blackburn in their final game in March, with Matějovský being controversially sent off for two yellow cards.

=== April ===
Reading went to St James' Park to play Newcastle in the Premier League. The Royals were beaten 3–0 with goals from Obafemi Martins in the 18th minute, Michael Owen in the 43rd and Mark Viduka in the 57th. This was only the start of a bad month for the Royals. Reading played fellow relegation rivals Fulham at home. 24,221 fans saw a 2–0 defeat as Brian McBride scored within 25 minutes. The Royals' day was over after Fulham substitute Erik Nevland scored a 90th-minute goal to see the Reading's hopes of staying up getting harder by the game.

Arsenal away was next. The Royals were not on form on the road and it showed. Reading lost 2–0 to the Gunners, with Emmanuel Adebayor and Gilberto Silva scoring. Wigan away was next for the Royals, which finished in a fair 0–0 draw. If Reading lost their next game, they could have been in the drop zone.

=== May ===
Reading's goal drought continued into May, as the club slipped into the relegation places following a 1–0 home defeat to Tottenham. Robbie Keane's first-half goal was enough to seal all three points for Spurs, for whom Radek Černý made an important late save from a Liam Rosenior shot.

Reading were officially relegated to the Championship on the final day of the season, despite securing a 4–0 victory away to Derby. Reading's strikers found their form a little too late, as Dave Kitson, Kevin Doyle and Leroy Lita all added to James Harper's first-half goal. Fulham beat Portsmouth 1–0 in their final game of the season to condemn Reading to relegation.

== Squad ==
As of match played 11 May 2008

No.	Name	Nationality	Position	Date of birth (age)	Signed from	Signed in	Contract ends	Apps.	Goals
Goalkeepers
1	Marcus Hahnemann	(United States)	GK	15 June 1972 (aged 35)	Fulham	2002		266	0
32	Adam Federici	(Australia)	GK	31 January 1985 (aged 23)	Torres	2005		10	0
36	Mikkel Andersen	(Denmark)	GK	17 December 1988 (aged 19)	AB	2007	2009	0	0
Defenders
2	Graeme Murty	(Scotland) (Note: Graeme Murty was born in Saltburn-by-the-Sea, North Yorkshire, England, but qualified to represent Scotland internationally through his parents, making his international debut for Scotland in 2004.)	DF	13 November 1974 (aged 33)	York City	1998		338	2
3	Nicky Shorey	(England)	DF	19 February 1981 (aged 27)	Leyton Orient	2001		296	12
5	Ibrahima Sonko	(Senegal)	DF	22 January 1981 (aged 27)	Brentford	2004		133	5
14	John Halls	(England)	DF	14 February 1982 (aged 26)	Stoke City	2006		8	2
16	Ívar Ingimarsson	(Iceland)	DF	20 August 1977 (aged 30)	Wolverhampton Wanderers	2003		206	11
19	Liam Rosenior	(England)	DF	9 July 1984 (aged 23)	Fulham	2007	2010	19	1
22	André Bikey	(Cameroon)	DF	8 January 1985 (aged 23)	Lokomotiv Moscow	2007	2010	45	4
23	Ulises de la Cruz	(Ecuador)	DF	8 February 1974 (aged 34)	Aston Villa	2006		25	1
29	Michael Duberry	(England)	DF	14 October 1975 (aged 32)	Stoke City	2007	2008	24	0
33	Scott Golbourne	(England)	DF	29 February 1988 (aged 20)	Bristol City	2006		4	0
38	Adam Bygrave	(England)	DF	24 February 1989 (aged 19)	Academy	2007		0	0
Midfielders
4	Kalifa Cissé	(Mali) (Note: Kalifa Cissé was born in Dreux, France, but qualified to represent Mali internationally and made his international debut for Mali in March 2008, having previously represented them at U-20 level.)	MF	9 January 1984 (aged 24)	Boavista	2007	2010	25	1
6	Brynjar Gunnarsson	(Iceland)	MF	16 October 1975 (aged 32)	Watford	2005		81	8
7	Glen Little	(England)	MF	15 October 1975 (aged 32)	Burnley	2004		114	6
10	Stephen Hunt	(Republic of Ireland)	MF	1 August 1981 (aged 26)	Brentford	2005		124	13
11	John Oster	(Wales) (Note: John Oster was born in Boston, England, but qualified to represent Wales, making his international debut for Wales in 1997.)	MF	8 December 1978 (aged 29)	Burnley	2005		90	3
15	James Harper	(England)	MF	9 November 1980 (aged 27)	Arsenal	2001		320	22
17	Bobby Convey	(United States)	MF	27 May 1983 (aged 24)	D.C. United	2004		103	8
20	Emerse Faé	(Ivory Coast) (Note: Emerse Faé was born in Nantes, France and represented them at U-17 and U-21 level, but also qualified to represent the Ivory Coast internationally and made his international debut for Ivory Coast in March 2005.)	MF	24 January 1984 (aged 24)	Nantes	2007	2010 (+1)	11	0
28	Marek Matějovský	(Czech Republic)	MF	20 December 1981 (aged 26)	Mladá Boleslav	2008	2011	14	1
30	Jimmy Kébé	(Mali) (Note: Jimmy Kébé was born in Vitry-sur-Seine, France, but qualified to represent Mali internationally and made his international debut for Mali in 2004.)	MF	19 January 1984 (aged 24)	Lens	2008	2010	5	0
34	James Henry	(England) (Note: James Henry was born in Reading, England, but also qualified to represent Scotland internationally through his parents and has represented Scotland at youth level. However, he would later represent England at youth level.)	MF	9 July 1987 (aged 20)	Academy	2004		1	0
42	Oliver Bozanic	(Australia)	MF	8 January 1989 (aged 19)	Central Coast Mariners	2007	2009	0	0
Forwards
8	Leroy Lita	(England) (Note: Leroy Lita was born in Kinshasa, DR Congo, but qualified to represent England, representing England at U-21 level.)	FW	28 December 1984 (aged 23)	Bristol City	2005		88	31
9	Kevin Doyle	(Republic of Ireland)	FW	18 September 1983 (aged 24)	Cork City	2005		121	38
12	Dave Kitson	(England)	FW	21 January 1980 (aged 28)	Cambridge United	2003		147	60
24	Shane Long	(Republic of Ireland)	FW	22 January 1987 (aged 21)	Cork City	2005		72	9
43	Viktor Illugason	(Iceland)	FW	25 January 1990 (aged 18)	Breiðablik	2007		0	0
	Radoslav Vasilev	(Bulgaria)	FW	12 October 1990 (aged 17)	Slavia Sofia	2007		0	0
Out on loan
18	Sam Sodje	(Nigeria) (Note: Sam Sodje was born in Greenwich, England, but also qualified to represent Nigeria internationally through his parents and made his international debut for Nigeria in 2004.)	DF	9 April 1981 (aged 27)	Brentford	2006		8	1
21	Graham Stack	(Republic of Ireland) (Note: Graham Stack was born in Hampstead, England, but qualified to represent Ireland, making his Republic of Ireland Under-21 debut 2003.)	GK	26 September 1981 (aged 26)	Arsenal	2005	2008	10	0
25	Alan Bennett	(Republic of Ireland)	DF	4 October 1981 (aged 26)	Cork City	2007		0	0
26	Curtis Osano	(Kenya)	DF	8 March 1987 (aged 21)	Academy	2005		2	0
27	Aaron Brown	(England)	DF	23 June 1983 (aged 24)	Tamworth	2005		0	0
35	Alex Pearce	(Scotland) (Note: Alex Pearce was born in Wallingford, England, but also qualified to represent Scotland and Ireland internationally through his parents and has represented Scotland at youth and U-21 level. He would, however, later be called up and make his full international debut for the Republic of Ireland in September 2012.)	DF	9 November 1988 (aged 19)	Academy	2006		4	0
37	Hal Robson-Kanu	(England) (Note: Hal Robson-Kanu was born in Ealing, England, and represented England at U-19 and U-20 level, but also qualified to represent Wales through his grandmother and made his international debut for the Welsh U-21 side in May 2010 before making his full international debut for Wales five days later.)	MF	21 May 1989 (aged 18)	Academy	2007		0	0
39	Simon Church	(Wales) (Note: Simon Church was born in High Wycombe, England, but also qualifies to represent Wales through his grandparents and made his international debut for the Welsh U-21 side in August 2007 before making his full international debut for Wales in May 2009.)	FW	10 December 1988 (aged 19)	Academy	2007		0	0
40	Jem Karacan	(Turkey) (Note: Jem Karacan was born in Lewisham, England, but also qualifies to represent Turkey internationally through his father and has represented Turkey at every youth level.)	MF	21 February 1989 (aged 19)	Academy	2007		0	0
41	Ben Hamer	(England)	GK	20 November 1987 (aged 20)	Academy	2006		0	0
44	Scott Davies	(Republic of Ireland) (Note: Scott Davies was born in Aylesbury, England, but also qualified to represent Ireland internationally and has represented them at youth and U-21 level.)	MF	9 July 1987 (aged 20)	Academy	2004		0	0
Left during the season
19	Seol Ki-hyeon	(South Korea)	MF	8 January 1979 (aged 29)	Wolverhampton Wanderers	2006		34	4
31	Simon Cox	(England) (Note: Simon Cox was born in Reading, England, but also qualified to represent Ireland internationally though his grandmother and would make his international debut for the Republic of Ireland in May 2011.)	FW	28 April 1987 (aged 21)	Academy	2005		9	0
47	Péter Máté	(Hungary)	DF	2 December 1984 (aged 23)	on loan from Debrecen	2006		1	1

=== Out on loan ===
Note: Flags indicate national team as defined under FIFA eligibility rules; some limited exceptions apply. Players may hold more than one non-FIFA nationality.

No.	Pos.	Nation	Player
18	DF	NGR	Sam Sodje (at Charlton Athletic until end of the season)
21	GK	IRL	Graham Stack (at Wolverhampton Wanderers until end of the season)
25	DF	IRL	Alan Bennett (at Brentford until end of the season)
26	DF	KEN	Curtis Osano (at Rushden & Diamonds until end of the season)
27	DF	ENG	Aaron Brown (at Walsall until end of the season)
35	DF	SCO	Alex Pearce (at Norwich City until end of the season)

No.	Pos.	Nation	Player
37	MF	WAL	Hal Robson-Kanu (at Southend United until end of the season)
39	FW	WAL	Simon Church (at Yeovil Town until end of the season)
40	MF	TUR	Jem Karacan (at Millwall until end of the season)
41	GK	ENG	Ben Hamer (at Brentford until end of the season)
44	MF	IRL	Scott Davies (at Aldershot Town until end of the season)

=== Left club during season ===
Note: Flags indicate national team as defined under FIFA eligibility rules; some limited exceptions apply. Players may hold more than one non-FIFA nationality.

No.	Pos.	Nation	Player
19	MF	KOR	Seol Ki-Hyeon (to Fulham)
31	FW	ENG	Simon Cox (to Swindon Town)
47	DF	HUN	Péter Máté (loan return to Debrecen)

== Transfers ==
=== In ===
Date	Position	Nationality	Name	From	Fee	Ref.
16 May 2007	MF	(Mali)	Kalifa Cissé	Boavista	€1,000,000	
2 August 2007	MF	(Ivory Coast)	Emerse Faé	Nantes	£2,500,000	
31 August 2007	DF	(England)	Liam Rosenior	Fulham	Undisclosed	
12 December 2007	FW	(Bulgaria)	Radoslav Vasilev	Slavia Sofia	Undisclosed	
7 January 2008	MF	(Czech Republic)	Marek Matějovský	Mladá Boleslav	Undisclosed	
28 January 2008	MF	(Mali)	Jimmy Kébé	Lens	Undisclosed	

=== Out ===
Date	Position	Nationality	Name	To	Fee	Ref.
31 August 2007	MF	(South Korea)	Seol Ki-Hyeon	Fulham	Undisclosed	
31 January 2008	FW	(England)	Simon Cox	Swindon Town	Undisclosed	

=== Loans out ===
Start date	Position	Nationality	Name	To	End date	Ref.
6 July 2007	DF	(Kenya)	Curtis Osano	Rushden & Diamonds	End of season	
24 July 2007	MF	(Republic of Ireland)	Scott Davies	Aldershot Town	End of season	
31 July 2007	DF	(Republic of Ireland)	Alan Bennett	Southampton	13 January 2008	
9 August 2007	GK	(Republic of Ireland)	Graham Stack	Wolverhampton Wanderers	End of season	
11 August 2007	GK	(England)	Ben Hamer	Brentford	14 October 2007	
31 August 2007	FW	(England)	Simon Cox	Swindon Town	January 2008	
31 August 2007	DF	(Nigeria)	Sam Sodje	Charlton Athletic	End of season	
18 October 2007	MF	(Turkey)	Jem Karacan	Bournemouth	6 January 2008	
19 October 2007	FW	(Wales)	Simon Church	Crewe Alexandra	19 January 2008	
1 November 2007	DF	(England)	John Halls	Preston North End	1 December 2007	
2 November 2007	MF	(England)	James Henry	Bournemouth	3 January 2008	
2 November 2007	DF	(Scotland)	Alex Pearce	Bournemouth	3 January 2008	
6 November 2007	DF	(England)	Scott Golbourne	Bournemouth	12 January 2008	
20 November 2007	DF	(England)	Adam Bygrave	Gillingham	22 April 2008	
1 January 2008	GK	(England)	Ben Hamer	Brentford	End of season	
9 January 2008	DF	(England)	John Halls	Crystal Palace	11 February 2008	
29 January 2008	FW	(Wales)	Simon Church	Yeovil Town	End of season	
30 January 2008	MF	(England)	Hal Robson-Kanu	Southend United	End of season	
31 January 2008	MF	(England)	James Henry	Norwich City	17 March 2008	
31 January 2008	DF	(Scotland)	Alex Pearce	Norwich City	End of season	
5 March 2008	FW	(England)	Leroy Lita	Charlton Athletic	19 April 2008	
7 March 2008	DF	(Republic of Ireland)	Alan Bennett	Brentford	End of Season	
20 March 2008	MF	(Turkey)	Jem Karacan	Millwall	End of Season	
27 March 2008	DF	(England)	Aaron Brown	Walsall	End of Season	

=== Released ===
Date	Position	Nationality	Name	Joined	Date	Ref
16 May 2008	DF	(England)	Aaron Brown	Yeovil Town	11 August 2008	
16 May 2008	DF	(England)	Adam Bygrave	Weymouth	25 May 2008	
16 May 2008	DF	(Ecuador)	Ulises de la Cruz	Birmingham City	3 March 2009	
16 May 2008	DF	(England)	John Halls	Brentford	25 September 2008	
16 May 2008	MF	(Wales)	John Oster	Crystal Palace	11 August 2008	
16 May 2008	GK	(Republic of Ireland)	Graham Stack	Plymouth Argyle	18 July 2008	
20 June 2008	MF	(England)	Glen Little	Portsmouth	20 June 2008	
30 June 2008	DF	(Kenya)	Curtis Osano	Rushden & Diamonds	July 2008	

=== Trial ===
Date from	Position	Nationality	Name	Last club	Date to	Ref.
17 January 2008	GK	(Poland)	Wojciech Kowalewski	Spartak Moscow	27 January 2008	

== Competitions ==
=== Overview ===
Competition	First match	Last match	Starting round	Final position	Record							
Competition	First match	Last match	Starting round	Final position	Pld	W	D	L	GF	GA	GD	Win %
Premier League	12 August 2007	11 May 2008	Matchday 1	18th	38	10	6	22	41	66	−25	26.32
FA Cup	5 January 2008	15 January 2008	Third round	Third round replay	2	0	1	1	2	3	−1	0.00
League Cup	28 August 2007	25 September 2007	Second round	Third round	2	1	0	1	3	4	−1	50.00
Total					42	11	7	24	46	73	−27	26.19

Last updated: 11 May 2008
Source: Competitions

=== Premier League ===
==== Results summary ====
Overall								Home						Away					
Pld	W	D	L	GF	GA	GD	Pts	W	D	L	GF	GA	GD	W	D	L	GF	GA	GD
38	10	6	22	41	66	−25	36	8	2	9	19	25	−6	2	4	13	22	41	−19

==== Results by round ====
Round	1	2	3	4	5	6	7	8	9	10	11	12	13	14	15	16	17	18	19	20	21	22	23	24	25	26	27	28	29	30	31	32	33	34	35	36	37	38
Ground	A	H	H	A	H	A	H	A	H	A	H	A	H	A	H	H	A	H	A	A	H	A	H	A	H	A	H	A	H	A	H	H	A	H	A	A	H	A
Result	D	L	W	L	L	L	W	L	W	L	W	L	L	L	D	W	D	W	D	L	L	L	L	L	L	L	L	W	W	L	W	D	L	L	L	D	L	W
Position	12	15	7	13	18	18	16	17	12	12	12	12	12	12	12	12	13	12	12	13	13	13	14	16	17	18	18	18	13	14	15	14	16	16	17	17	18	18

A = Away; H = Home; W = Win; D = Draw; L = Loss

==== Results ====
12 August 2007 1	Manchester United	0–0	Reading	Trafford
16:00 BST (UTC+1)		Report	Seol (yellow card) 22'; Kitson (red card) 73'; Harper (yellow card) 90'	Stadium: Old Trafford; Attendance: 75,655; Referee: Rob Styles

15 August 2007 2	Reading	1–2	Chelsea	Reading
20:00 BST (UTC+1)	Long (yellow card) 13'; Cissé (yellow card) 15' (yellow-red card) 72'; Bikey 30'; Hunt (yellow card) 37'; Ingimarsson (yellow card) 52'	Report	Carvalho (yellow card) 26'; Sidwell (yellow card) 31'; Lampard 47'; Drogba 50'; Wright-Phillips (yellow card) 76'; A. Cole (yellow card) 89'; Mikel (yellow card) 90'	Stadium: Madejski Stadium; Attendance: 24,031; Referee: Mike Dean

18 August 2007 3	Reading	1–0	Everton	Reading
15:00 BST (UTC+1)	Hunt 44'; Ingimarsson (yellow card) 74'; Long (yellow card) 85'	Report	Lescott (yellow card) 73'; McFadden (yellow card) 81'	Stadium: Madejski Stadium; Attendance: 22,813; Referee: Steve Bennett

25 August 2007 4	Bolton Wanderers	3–0	Reading	Horwich
15:00 BST (UTC+1)	Speed 31'; Anelka 54'; N.Hunt (yellow card) 70'; Méïté (yellow card) 76'; Braaten 90+1'	Report	de la Cruz (yellow card) 71'	Stadium: Reebok Stadium; Attendance: 20,023; Referee: Mark Clattenburg

1 September 2007 5	Reading	0–3	West Ham United	Reading
15:00 BST (UTC+1)		Report	Bellamy 6'; Etherington 49', 90'; Green (yellow card) 55'	Stadium: Madejski Stadium; Attendance: 23,533; Referee: Howard Webb

15 September 2007 6	Sunderland	2–1	Reading	Sunderland
15:00 BST (UTC+1)	Jones 29'; Wallace 47', (yellow card) 47'	Report	Gunnarsson (yellow card) 49'; Bikey (yellow card) 66'; Kitson 85'	Stadium: Stadium of Light; Attendance: 39,272; Referee: Steve Tanner

22 September 2007 7	Reading	2–1	Wigan Athletic	Reading
15:00 BST (UTC+1)	Kitson 29'; Ingimarsson (yellow card) 30'; Rosenior (yellow card) 43'; Harper 90'; Hahnemann (yellow card) 90'	Report	Brown (yellow card) 35'; Bent 50'; Bramble (yellow card) 90'	Stadium: Madejski Stadium; Attendance: 21,379; Referee: Keith Stroud

29 September 2007 8	Portsmouth	7–4	Reading	Portsmouth
15:00 BST (UTC+1)	Benjani 7', 37', 70'; Hreiðarsson 55'; Taylor (yellow card) 65'; Kranjčar 75'; Imgimarsson 81' (o.g.); Muntari 90+2' (pen.)	Report	Hunt 45'; Kitson 48'; Long 79'; Duberry (yellow card) 90'; Campbell 90+4' (o.g.)	Stadium: Fratton Park; Attendance: 20,102; Referee: Mark Halsey

7 October 2007 9	Reading	1–0	Derby County	Reading
14:00 BST (UTC+1)	Ingimarsson (yellow card) 30'; Doyle 63'	Report	Davis (yellow card) 38'	Stadium: Madejski Stadium; Attendance: 23,091; Referee: Lee Mason

20 October 2007 10	Blackburn Rovers	4–2	Reading	Blackburn
15:00 BST (UTC+1)	McCarthy 18', 82' (pen.); Santa Cruz 22'; Kerimoğlu 32'	Report	Doyle 80', 90+1'	Stadium: Ewood Park; Attendance: 19,425; Referee: Andre Marriner

27 October 2007 11	Reading	2–1	Newcastle United	Reading
15:00 BST (UTC+1)	Kitson 53'; Long 84'	Report	Faye (yellow card) 71'; Duberry 76' (o.g.)	Stadium: Madejski Stadium; Attendance: 24,119; Referee: Phil Dowd

3 November 2007 12	Fulham	3–1	Reading	Fulham
15:00 GMT (UTC)	Davies 16'; Stefanović (yellow card) 34'; Omozusi (yellow card) 50' (yellow-red card) 90'; Dempsey 72'; Healy (yellow card) 83', (goal) 90'	Report	Doyle 54'	Stadium: Craven Cottage; Attendance: 22,086; Referee: Mark Clattenburg

12 November 2007 13	Reading	1–3	Arsenal	Reading
20:00 GMT (UTC)	Gunnarsson (yellow card) 85'; Shorey 87'	Report	Flamini 43'; Adebayor 52'; Hleb 78'; Fàbregas (yellow card) 79'	Stadium: Madejski Stadium; Attendance: 24,024; Referee: Rob Styles

24 November 2007 14	Manchester City	2–1	Reading	Manchester
15:00 GMT (UTC)	Petrov 11'; Ireland 90+4'	Report	Harper 43'; Hunt (yellow card) 50'; Long (yellow card) 86'	Stadium: City of Manchester Stadium; Attendance: 43,813; Referee: Steve Tanner

1 December 2007 15	Reading	1–1	Middlesbrough	Reading
15:00 GMT (UTC)	Murty (yellow card) 44'; Kitson 54'; Gunnarsson (yellow card) 55'	Report	Johnson (yellow card) 48'; Tuncay 83'	Stadium: Madejski Stadium; Attendance: 22,262; Referee: Alan Wiley

8 December 2007 16	Reading	3–1	Liverpool	Reading
17:15 GMT (UTC)	Hunt 16' (pen.); Doyle 59'; Harper 67'	Report	Gerrard 28', (yellow card) 58'	Stadium: Madejski Stadium; Attendance: 24,022; Referee: Andre Marriner

15 December 2007 17	Birmingham City	1–1	Reading	Birmingham
15:00 GMT (UTC)	Forssell 4'; Johnson (yellow card) 39'; Larsson (yellow card) 63'	Report	Murty (yellow card) 38'; Hunt 51' (pen.)	Stadium: St. Andrews; Attendance: 27,300; Referee: Lee Probert

22 December 2007 18	Reading	2–1	Sunderland	Reading
15:00 GMT (UTC)	Ingimarsson 69'; Hunt 90+2'	Report	Murphy (yellow card) 32'; Leadbitter (yellow card) 38'; Jones (yellow card) 61'; Chopra 82' (pen.); Yorke (yellow card) 90'	Stadium: Madejski Stadium; Attendance: 24,082; Referee: Steve Tanner

26 December 2007 19	West Ham United	1–1	Reading	Newham
13:00 GMT (UTC)	Solano 42'; Green (yellow card) 44'; Cole (yellow card) 64'	Report	Gunnarsson (red card); Hunt (yellow card) 44'; Kitson 60'; Shorey (yellow card) 66'	Stadium: Upton Park; Attendance: 34,277; Referee: Peter Walton

29 December 2007 20	Tottenham Hotspur	6–4	Reading	Tottenham
15:00 GMT (UTC)	Berbatov 7', 63', 73', 83'; Malbranque 76'; Defoe 79'	Report	Cissé (yellow card) 8', (goal) 16'; Ingimarsson 53'; Kitson 69', 74'; Shorey (yellow card) 77'; Long (yellow card) 90'	Stadium: White Hart Lane; Attendance: 36,178; Referee: Keith Stroud

1 January 2008 21	Reading	0–2	Portsmouth	Reading
15:00 GMT (UTC)	Sonko (red card) 3'; Murty (yellow card) 23'; Cissé (yellow card) 63'; Bikey (yellow card) 81'	Report	Campbell 9'; Hughes (yellow card) 58'; Utaka 66'	Stadium: Madejski Stadium; Attendance: 24,084; Referee: Mike Dean

12 January 2008 22	Aston Villa	3–1	Reading	Birmingham
15:00 GMT (UTC)	Carew 22', 87'; Laursen 55'	Report	de la Cruz (yellow card) 26'; Hahnemann (yellow card) 48'; Harper 90+2'	Stadium: Villa Park; Attendance: 38,288; Referee: Uriah Rennie

19 January 2008 23	Reading	0–2	Manchester United	Reading
15:00 GMT (UTC)	Convey (yellow card) 68'	Report	Ferdinand (yellow card) 68'; Rooney 77'; Ronaldo 90+3'	Stadium: Madejski Stadium; Attendance: 24,135; Referee: Steve Bennett

30 January 2008 24	Chelsea	1–0	Reading	Walham Green
19:45 GMT (UTC)	Ballack 31'	Report		Stadium: Stamford Bridge; Attendance: 41,171; Referee: Mike Dean

2 February 2008 25	Reading	0–2	Bolton Wanderers	Reading
15:00 GMT (UTC)	Lita (yellow card) 34'; Kitson (yellow card) 44'; Ingimarsson (yellow card) 90'	Report	Davies (yellow card) 13'; Nolan 33'; Helguson 58'	Stadium: Madejski Stadium; Attendance: 21,893; Referee: Phil Dowd

9 February 2008 26	Everton	1–0	Reading	Liverpool
15:00 GMT (UTC)	Jagielka 62'	Report		Stadium: Goodison Park; Attendance: 36,582; Referee: Mark Halsey

24 February 2008 27	Reading	1–2	Aston Villa	Reading
12:30 GMT (UTC)	Sonko (yellow card) 42'; Matějovský (yellow card) 52'; Shorey 90+4'	Report	Young 45'; Gardner (yellow card) 51'; Harewood 83'	Stadium: Madejski Stadium; Attendance: 23,889; Referee: Martin Atkinson

1 March 2008 28	Middlesbrough	0–1	Reading	Middlesbrough
15:00 GMT (UTC)	Boateng (yellow card) 30'; Wheater (yellow card) 32'; Grounds (yellow card) 73'; Downing (yellow card) 77'	Report	Bikey (yellow card) 17'; Rosenior (yellow card) 41'; Hunt (yellow card) 65'; Shorey (yellow card) 80'; Long (yellow card) 90'; Harper 90+1'	Stadium: Riverside Stadium; Attendance: 23,273; Referee: Howard Webb

8 March 2008 29	Reading	2–0	Manchester City	Reading
15:00 GMT (UTC)	Long 61'; Kitson 88'	Report	Hamann (yellow card) 18'; Johnson (yellow card) 43'	Stadium: Madejski Stadium; Attendance: 24,062; Referee: Uriah Rennie

15 March 2008 30	Liverpool	2–1	Reading	Liverpool
15:00 GMT (UTC)	Mascherano 19'; Torres 48'	Report	Matějovský 5'; Hunt (yellow card) 59'; Ingimarsson (yellow card) 65'; Bikey (yellow card) 79'; Cissé (yellow card) 87'	Stadium: Anfield; Attendance: 43,524; Referee: Andre Marriner

22 March 2008 31	Reading	2–1	Birmingham City	Reading
15:00 GMT (UTC)	Bikey 31', 79'	Report	Zárate 64'; Ridgewell (yellow card) 79'	Stadium: Madejski Stadium; Attendance: 24,085; Referee: Mike Riley

29 March 2008 32	Reading	0–0	Blackburn Rovers	Reading
15:00 GMT (UTC)	Hahnemann (yellow card) 39'; Matějovský (yellow card) 61' (yellow-red card) 72'; Shorey (yellow card) 77'	Report	Nelsen (yellow card) 39'; Warnock (yellow card) 49'; Roberts (yellow card) 52'; Reid (yellow card) 58'; Khizanishvili (yellow card) 90'	Stadium: Madejski Stadium; Attendance: 23,374; Referee: Mark Clattenburg

5 April 2008 33	Newcastle United	3–0	Reading	Newcastle upon Tyne
15:00 BST (UTC+1)	Martins 18'; Owen 43'; Viduka 57'	Report	Bikey (yellow card) 41'	Stadium: St James' Park; Attendance: 52,179; Referee: Lee Probert

12 April 2008 34	Reading	0–2	Fulham	Reading
15:00 BST (UTC+1)		Report	McBride 24'; Stalteri (yellow card) 79'; Nevland 90'	Stadium: Madejski Stadium; Attendance: 24,112; Referee: Chris Foy

19 April 2008 35	Arsenal	2–0	Reading	Islington
12:45 BST (UTC+1)	Adebayor 30'; Gilberto 39'	Report	Kitson (yellow card) 28'; Bikey (yellow card) 58'; Sonko (yellow card) 70'	Stadium: Emirates Stadium; Attendance: 60,109; Referee: Peter Walton

26 April 2008 36	Wigan Athletic	0–0	Reading	Wigan
15:00 BST (UTC+1)	Taylor (yellow card) 55'; Kilbane (yellow card) 69'	Report	Shorey (yellow card) 30'; Hunt (yellow card) 32'; Bikey (yellow card) 53'; Duberry (yellow card) 64'	Stadium: JJB Stadium; Attendance: 19,043; Referee: Martin Atkinson

3 May 2008 37	Reading	0–1	Tottenham Hotspur	Reading
15:00 BST (UTC+1)	Harper (yellow card) 88'	Report	Keane 16'	Stadium: Madejski Stadium; Attendance: 24,125; Referee: Howard Webb

11 May 2008 38	Derby County	0–4	Reading	Derby
15:00 BST (UTC+1)		Report	Harper 14'; Kitson 60'; Doyle 68'; Lita 90'	Stadium: Pride Park Stadium; Attendance: 33,087; Referee: Mike Riley

==== Table ====
Pos	Team	Pld	W	D	L	GF	GA	GD	Pts	Qualification or relegation
16	Bolton Wanderers	38	9	10	19	36	54	−18	37	
17	Fulham	38	8	12	18	38	60	−22	36	
18	Reading (R)	38	10	6	22	41	66	−25	36	Relegation to Football League Championship
19	Birmingham City (R)	38	8	11	19	46	62	−16	35	Relegation to Football League Championship
20	Derby County (R)	38	1	8	29	20	89	−69	11	Relegation to Football League Championship

Source: Barclays Premier League
Rules for classification: 1) points; 2) goal difference; 3) number of goals scored.
For further information on European qualification see Premier League – Competition
(R) Relegated

=== FA Cup ===
5 January 2008 Third Round	Tottenham Hotspur	2–2	Reading	London
15:00 GMT (UTC)	Berbatov 29', 49' (pen.); Huddlestone (red card) 82'; Jenas (yellow card) 90'; Zokora (yellow card) 90'	Report	Duberry (yellow card) 46'; Hunt 25', 77'; Convey (yellow card) 82'	Stadium: White Hart Lane; Attendance: 35,243; Referee: Mark Clattenburg

15 January 2008 Third Round Reply	Reading	0–1	Tottenham Hotspur	Reading
20:00 GMT (UTC)	Lita (yellow card) 12'; Long (yellow card) 86'	Report	Keane 15' (yellow card) 73'	Stadium: Madejski Stadium; Attendance: 22,130; Referee: Mike Riley

=== League Cup ===
28 August 2007 Second Round	Swansea City	0–1 (a.e.t.)	Reading	Swansea
19:45 BST (UTC+1)	Monk (yellow card)	Report	Sodje (yellow card) (yellow-red card) 58'; Lita 105'; Halls (yellow card); Cissé (yellow card); Faé (yellow card)	Stadium: Liberty Stadium; Attendance: 12,027; Referee: Kevin Friend

25 September 2007 Third Round	Reading	2–4	Liverpool	Reading
19:45 BST (UTC+1)	Convey 28'; Halls 64'; Bikey (yellow card); Duberry (yellow card); Faé (yellow card)	Report	Benayoun 23'; Torres 50', 72', 86'; Leiva (yellow card)	Stadium: Madejski Stadium; Attendance: 23,563; Referee: Martin Atkinson

== Statistics ==
As of match played 11 May 2008

=== Appearances and goals ===
No.	Pos	Nat	Player	Total		Premier League		FA Cup		League Cup	
No.	Pos	Nat	Player	Apps	Goals	Apps	Goals	Apps	Goals	Apps	Goals
1	GK	(United States) USA	Marcus Hahnemann	38	0	38	0	0	0	0	0
2	DF	(Scotland) SCO	Graeme Murty	28	0	28	0	0	0	0	0
3	DF	(England) ENG	Nicky Shorey	38	2	36	2	1	0	1	0
4	MF	(Mali) MLI	Kalifa Cissé	25	1	11+11	1	2	0	1	0
5	DF	(Senegal) SEN	Ibrahima Sonko	16	0	15+1	0	0	0	0	0
6	MF	(Iceland) ISL	Brynjar Gunnarsson	20	0	18+2	0	0	0	0	0
7	MF	(England) ENG	Glen Little	2	0	0+2	0	0	0	0	0
8	FW	(England) ENG	Leroy Lita	18	2	10+4	1	2	0	2	1
9	FW	(Republic of Ireland) IRL	Kevin Doyle	36	6	34+2	6	0	0	0	0
10	MF	(Republic of Ireland) IRL	Stephen Hunt	40	6	37	4	2	2	1	0
11	MF	(Wales) WAL	John Oster	18	0	12+6	0	0	0	0	0
12	FW	(England) ENG	Dave Kitson	36	10	34	10	0	0	2	0
14	DF	(England) ENG	John Halls	3	1	0+1	0	0	0	2	1
15	MF	(England) ENG	James Harper	41	6	38	6	1	0	2	0
16	DF	(Iceland) ISL	Ívar Ingimarsson	35	2	33+1	2	1	0	0	0
17	MF	(United States) USA	Bobby Convey	24	1	12+8	0	2	0	2	1
18	DF	(Nigeria) NGR	Sam Sodje	1	0	0	0	0	0	1	0
19	DF	(England) ENG	Liam Rosenior	19	1	15+2	1	2	0	0	0
20	MF	(Ivory Coast) CIV	Emerse Faé	11	0	3+5	0	1	0	2	0
22	DF	(Cameroon) CMR	André Bikey	24	3	14+8	3	1	0	1	0
23	DF	(Ecuador) ECU	Ulises de la Cruz	10	0	6	0	2	0	2	0
24	FW	(Republic of Ireland) IRL	Shane Long	32	3	29	3	2	0	1	0
28	MF	(Czech Republic) CZE	Marek Matějovský	14	1	14	1	0	0	0	0
29	DF	(England) ENG	Michael Duberry	16	0	13	0	1	0	2	0
30	MF	(Mali) MLI	Jimmy Kébé	5	0	5	0	0	0	0	0
32	GK	(Australia) AUS	Adam Federici	4	0	0	0	2	0	2	0
33	DF	(England) ENG	Scott Golbourne	2	0	1	0	0	0	1	0
34	MF	(England) ENG	James Henry	1	0	0	0	0	0	1	0
35	DF	(Scotland) SCO	Alex Pearce	3	0	0	0	2	0	1	0
Players who appeared for Reading no longer at the club:
19	MF	(South Korea) KOR	Seol Ki-hyeon	3	0	3	0	0	0	0	0
31	FW	(England) ENG	Simon Cox	2	0	0	0	1	0	1	0

=== Goal Scorers ===
Place	Position	Nation	Number	Name	Premier League	FA Cup	League Cup	Total
1	FW	(England)	12	Dave Kitson	10	0	0	10
2	FW	(Republic of Ireland)	19	Kevin Doyle	6	0	0	6
2	MF	(England)	15	James Harper	6	0	0	6
2	MF	(Republic of Ireland)	10	Stephen Hunt	4	2	0	6
5	DF	(Cameroon)	22	André Bikey	3	0	0	3
5	FW	(Republic of Ireland)	24	Shane Long	3	0	0	3
7	DF	(Iceland)	16	Ívar Ingimarsson	2	0	0	2
7	DF	(England)	3	Nicky Shorey	2	0	0	2
7	FW	(England)	8	Leroy Lita	1	0	1	2
10	MF	(Czech Republic)	28	Marek Matějovský	1	0	0	1
10	DF	(England)	19	Liam Rosenior	1	0	0	1
10	MF	(Mali)	4	Kalifa Cissé	1	0	0	1
10	MF	(United States)	17	Bobby Convey	0	0	1	1
10	DF	(England)	14	John Halls	0	0	1	1
10				Own goal	1	0	0	1
				TOTALS	41	2	3	46

=== Clean sheets ===
Place	Position	Nation	Number	Name	Premier League	FA Cup	League Cup	Total
1	GK	(United States)	1	Marcus Hahnemann	8	0	0	8
2	GK	(Australia)	32	Adam Federici	0	0	1	1
TOTALS					8	0	1	9

=== Disciplinary record ===
Number	Nation	Position	Name	Premier League		FA Cup		League Cup		Total	
Number	Nation	Position	Name	Yellow card	Red card	Yellow card	Red card	Yellow card	Red card	Yellow card	Red card
2	(Scotland)	DF	Graeme Murty	3	0	0	0	0	0	3	0
3	(England)	DF	Nicky Shorey	5	0	0	0	0	0	5	0
4	(Mali)	MF	Kalifa Cissé	4	1	0	0	1	0	5	1
5	(Senegal)	DF	Ibrahima Sonko	2	1	0	0	0	0	2	1
6	(Iceland)	MF	Brynjar Gunnarsson	3	1	0	0	0	0	3	1
8	(England)	FW	Leroy Lita	1	0	1	0	0	0	2	0
9	(Republic of Ireland)	FW	Kevin Doyle	1	0	0	0	0	0	1	0
10	(Republic of Ireland)	MF	Stephen Hunt	5	0	0	0	0	0	5	0
11	(Wales)	MF	John Oster	1	0	0	0	0	0	1	0
12	(England)	FW	Dave Kitson	2	1	0	0	0	0	2	1
14	(England)	DF	John Halls	0	0	0	0	1	0	1	0
15	(England)	MF	James Harper	1	0	0	0	0	0	1	0
16	(Iceland)	DF	Ívar Ingimarsson	6	0	0	0	0	0	6	0
17	(United States)	MF	Bobby Convey	1	0	1	0	0	0	2	0
18	(Nigeria)	DF	Sam Sodje	0	0	0	0	2	1	2	1
19	(England)	DF	Liam Rosenior	2	0	0	0	0	0	2	0
20	(Ivory Coast)	MF	Emerse Faé	0	0	0	0	2	0	2	0
22	(Cameroon)	DF	André Bikey	7	0	0	0	1	0	8	0
23	(Ecuador)	DF	Ulises de la Cruz	2	0	0	0	0	0	2	0
24	(Republic of Ireland)	FW	Shane Long	6	0	1	0	0	0	7	0
28	(Czech Republic)	MF	Marek Matějovský	3	1	0	0	0	0	3	1
29	(England)	DF	Michael Duberry	2	0	1	0	1	0	4	0
Players away on loan:
Players who left Reading during the season:
19	(South Korea)	MF	Seol Ki-hyeon	1	0	0	0	0	0	1	0
Total				58	5	4	0	8	1	70	6
