= 2006–07 Reading F.C. season =

Reading
2006–07 season
- Chairman: John Madejski
- Manager: Steve Coppell
- Premier League: 8th
- FA Cup: Fifth Round vs Manchester United
- League Cup: Third Round vs Liverpool
- Top goalscorer: League: Kevin Doyle (13); All: Leroy Lita (14)
- Highest home attendance: 24,122 vs Aston Villa (10 February 2007)
- Lowest home attendance: 10,353 vs Darlington (19 September 2006)
Home colours	Away colours	Third colours

The 2006–07 season was Reading Football Club's first season in the Premier League, and their first season in the top flight of English football. Reading also participated in the League Cup, beating Darlington in the second round before losing 4–3 to Liverpool at Anfield. Reading entered the FA Cup at the third round stage, defeating Burnley 3–2 and then Birmingham City by the same score to meet Manchester United in the Fifth Round. After drawing the initial game 1–1 at Old Trafford, Reading lost 2–3 at home in the replay ten days later, conceding the three goals in the first six minutes of the match. They collected 55 points from 38 matches which was good enough for eighth place, making this Reading's best ever league season.

== Review and events ==
=== August ===
Reading's first ever Premier League game came at home to Middlesbrough. Reading were 2–0 down after 20 minutes after goals from Stewart Downing and Yakubu, but ended up 3−2 winners through goals from Dave Kitson, Steve Sidwell and Leroy Lita. Kitson, however, was injured in a reckless tackle by Chris Riggott, and would not play again until the end of January 2007.

Reading's next game was against Aston Villa. After an early lead through Kevin Doyle, Ibrahima Sonko conceded a penalty and was sent off. Juan Pablo Ángel scored the resulting penalty for Villa, and Gareth Barry scored in the 61st minute to seal a win for Villa. The Royals next played Wigan Athletic, Emile Heskey scoring the only goal in a 1−0 win for Wigan.

=== September ===
In September, Reading's first game was against Manchester City, live on Sky Sports at home. Ívar Ingimarsson scored the only goal, despite being knocked unconscious before scoring. The first game against a side promoted with Reading was Sheffield United. Kevin Doyle scored after 16 seconds and in the 25th minute, followed by Seol Ki-hyeon scoring a 25-yard goal. Rob Hulse pulled a goal back in the 61st minute, but it was not enough for Sheffield United, who lost 2−1. Reading's first cup game came against Darlington, but Reading needed penalties after an exciting 3−3 draw. Next up were league runners up Manchester United at the Madejski. Reading ensured it was goalless at half-time and went 1−0 up through a Kevin Doyle penalty after Gary Neville handballed. Cristiano Ronaldo, however, scored a 73rd-minute goal to make it 1−1.

=== October ===
In October, Reading played West Ham at Upton Park where a second-minute goal turned out to be the winner, scored by Seol. Reading–Chelsea hit the headlines as both Chelsea goalkeepers were knocked out in a match where the visitors took a fortuitous 1−0 win. Frank Lampard scored Chelsea's goal which took two deflections before going in. The goal was given as an Ívar Ingimarsson own goal. In the same match 2), Robin van Persie and Alexander Hleb scoring. Shane Long made his first Premier League start in this match. Reading also lost 4−3 to Liverpool in the Carling Cup (Reading were 3−0 down).

=== November ===
In November, Reading lost 2−0 to Liverpool (which was also the first ever league meeting between the two sides). The goals came from Dirk Kuyt. The Royals then won 3−1 against Tottenham Hotspur. Robbie Keane opened the scoring for Spurs before Nicky Shorey scored a 25-yard goal. Then Steve Sidwell scored a header on the stroke of half-time with Kevin Doyle completing the scoring to make it 3−1. Reading's next match was against Charlton. They won 2−0 with the goals coming from Seol Ki-hyeon and Doyle. They ended the month with a 1−0 win over Fulham with a penalty kick from Doyle, after the striker had been bought down by Ian Pearce.

=== December ===
In December, Reading Won 1−0 at Bolton, a Kevin Doyle goal won the match. Next was Reading's longest away trip this season when Reading played Newcastle United. Reading lost 3−2, an 84th-minute winner by Emre. Reading played Watford in the worst game of the season, Watford 0−0). Reading and Blackburn Rovers was the next game at the Madjeski. Reading went 1–0 up on half-time, but Rovers scored two goals to make it Reading 1−2 Rovers. Chelsea played Reading next, two months after the teams played in Reading; the match ended 2−2. Reading then played Manchester United: Reading were losing 1−0, but Sonko scored to level the game. United then scored two goals though Cristiano Ronaldo to make it 3−1, although Lita scored a consolation goal to make the final score United 3−2 Reading.

=== January ===
In January, Reading could not have got a better start. On New Year's Day, Reading put six past West Ham United. On 6 January, Reading were due to play Burnley in the FA Cup but it was postponed due to a waterlogged pitch, but Reading beat Burnley on the Tuesday night, a 3−2 win. Reading went to Everton unbeaten in the new year, and the game ended 1−1 in a match attended by Sylvester Stallone as an Everton supporter and guest of the chairman. Reading played Sheffield United at 2−0 Reading came a push-up in the dug out. Warnock and Downs sent off. Reading won 3−1. Reading Played Birmingham in the FA Cup (again). Birmingham had just enjoyed a 5−1 win at Newcastle United but they lost 3−2 to the Royals. Reading beat Wigan by the same score.

=== February ===
In February, Reading beat Manchester City away and Aston Villa at home. Both ending 2–0. At Old Trafford, Reading drew 1−1 with United in the FA Cup. Boro became the first team to beat Reading in 2007. Boro won 2−1. Reading were 3–0 down in the FA Cup 5th Round Replay against United in 5 minutes 41 seconds, but fought back to lose by only 3−2.

=== March to May ===
In March, April and May, Reading lost at Arsenal 2−1. Reading were 2−0 down, but drawing 0−0 at half-time, in the 87th minute when Arsenal scored an own goal courtesy of Cesc Fàbregas. Reading got a point at home to Portsmouth drawing 0−0. Reading lost to Spurs 1−0. Spurs scored a consolation penalty on half-time. Liverpool won at Reading 2−1. Liverpool's winner was in the 85th minute by Kuyt. Reading were held to a 0−0 draw at Charlton. Reading won at home to Fulham. They won at Bolton, 3−1, after being 1−0 down in the 85th minute. A midweek win at home to Newcastle United, 1−0, Kitson scored for the Royals. Reading shockingly lost to Watford at home 2−0. On the final day of the season, Reading played Blackburn Rovers away and needing a win to enter the UEFA Cup, Reading drew 3−3.

== Squad ==
As of match played 13 May 2007

No.	Name	Nationality	Position	Date of birth (age)	Signed from	Signed in	Contract ends	Apps.	Goals
Goalkeepers
1	Marcus Hahnemann	(United States)	GK	15 June 1972 (aged 34)	Fulham	2002		228	0
21	Graham Stack	(Republic of Ireland) (Note: Graham Stack was born in Hampstead, England, but qualified to represent Republic of Ireland, making his Republic of Ireland Under-21 debut 2003.)	GK	26 September 1981 (aged 25)	Arsenal	2005	2008	10	0
32	Adam Federici	(Australia)	GK	31 January 1985 (aged 22)	Torres	2005		6	0
36	Mikkel Andersen	(Denmark)	GK	17 December 1988 (aged 18)	AB	2007	2009	0	0
Defenders
2	Graeme Murty	(Scotland) (Note: Graeme Murty was born in Saltburn-by-the-Sea, North Yorkshire, England, but qualified to represent Scotland internationally through his parents, making his international debut for Scotland in 2004.)	DF	13 November 1974 (aged 32)	York City	1998		310	2
3	Nicky Shorey	(England)	DF	19 February 1981 (aged 26)	Leyton Orient	2001		258	10
5	Ibrahima Sonko	(Senegal)	DF	22 January 1981 (aged 26)	Brentford	2004		117	5
14	John Halls	(England)	DF	14 February 1982 (aged 25)	Stoke City	2006		5	1
16	Ívar Ingimarsson	(Iceland)	DF	20 August 1977 (aged 29)	Wolverhampton Wanderers	2003		172	9
18	Sam Sodje	(Nigeria) (Note: Sam Sodje was born in Greenwich, England, but also qualified to represent Nigeria internationally through his parents and made his international debut for Nigeria in 2004.)	DF	9 April 1981 (aged 26)	Brentford	2006		7	1
22	André Bikey	(Cameroon)	DF	8 January 1985 (aged 22)	Lokomotiv Moscow	2007	2010	21	1
23	Ulises de la Cruz	(Ecuador)	DF	8 February 1974 (aged 33)	Aston Villa	2006	2007	15	1
25	Alan Bennett	(Republic of Ireland)	DF	4 October 1981 (aged 25)	Cork City	2007		0	0
26	Curtis Osano	(Kenya)	DF	8 March 1987 (aged 20)	Academy	2005		2	0
27	Aaron Brown	(England)	DF	23 June 1983 (aged 23)	Tamworth	2005		0	0
28	Greg Halford	(England)	DF	8 December 1984 (aged 22)	Colchester United	2007		3	0
29	Michael Duberry	(England)	DF	14 October 1975 (aged 31)	Stoke City	2007	2008	8	0
34	Scott Golbourne	(England)	DF	29 February 1988 (aged 19)	Bristol City	2006		2	0
35	Alex Pearce	(Scotland) (Note: Alex Pearce was born in Wallingford, England, but also qualified to represent Scotland and the Republic of Ireland internationally through his parents and has represented Scotland at youth and U-21 level. He would, however, later be called up and make his full international debut for the Republic of Ireland in September 2012.)	DF	9 November 1988 (aged 18)	Academy	2006		1	0
47	Péter Máté	(Hungary)	DF	2 December 1984 (aged 22)	on loan from Debrecen	2006		1	1
Midfielders
4	Steve Sidwell	(England)	MF	14 December 1982 (aged 24)	Arsenal	2003		187	30
6	Brynjar Gunnarsson	(Iceland)	MF	16 October 1975 (aged 31)	Watford	2005		61	8
7	Glen Little	(England)	MF	15 October 1975 (aged 31)	Burnley	2004		112	6
10	Stephen Hunt	(Republic of Ireland)	MF	1 August 1981 (aged 25)	Brentford	2005		84	7
11	John Oster	(Wales) (Note: John Oster was born in Boston, England, but qualified to represent Wales, making his international debut for Wales in 1997.)	MF	8 December 1978 (aged 28)	Burnley	2005		72	3
15	James Harper	(England)	MF	9 November 1980 (aged 26)	Arsenal	2001		279	16
17	Bobby Convey	(United States)	MF	27 May 1983 (aged 23)	D.C. United	2004		79	7
19	Seol Ki-hyeon	(South Korea)	MF	8 January 1979 (aged 28)	Wolverhampton Wanderers	2006		31	4
20	Jonny Hayes	(Republic of Ireland)	MF	9 July 1987 (aged 19)	Academy	2004		0	0
30	Scott Davies	(Republic of Ireland) (Note: Scott Davies was born in Aylesbury, England, but also qualified to represent the Republic of Ireland internationally and has represented them at youth and U-21 level.)	MF	9 July 1987 (aged 19)	Academy	2004		0	0
34	James Henry	(Scotland) (Note: James Henry was born in Reading, England, but also qualified to represent Scotland internationally through his parents and has represented Scotland at youth level. However, he would later represent England at youth level.)	MF	9 July 1987 (aged 19)	Academy	2004		0	0
Forwards
8	Leroy Lita	(England) (Note: Leroy Lita was born in Kinshasa, DR Congo, but qualified to represent England, representing England at U-21 level.)	FW	28 December 1984 (aged 22)	Bristol City	2005		70	29
9	Kevin Doyle	(Republic of Ireland)	FW	18 September 1983 (aged 23)	Cork City	2005		85	32
12	Dave Kitson	(England)	FW	21 January 1980 (aged 27)	Cambridge United	2003		111	50
24	Shane Long	(Republic of Ireland)	FW	22 January 1987 (aged 20)	Cork City	2005		40	6
31	Simon Cox	(England) (Note: Simon Cox was born in Reading, England, but also qualified to represent the Republic of Ireland internationally though his grandmother and would make his international debut for the Republic of Ireland in May 2011.)	FW	28 April 1987 (aged 20)	Academy	2005		7	0
Out on loan
Left during the season
33	Conor Sinnott	(Republic of Ireland)	MF	9 July 1987 (aged 19)	Bray Wanderers	2006		0	0
	Curtis Ujah	(England)	DF	22 August 1988 (aged 18)	Academy	2006		0	0
	Pierre-Joseph Dubois	(France)	FW	12 February 1988 (aged 19)	Academy	2006		0	0

=== Left club during season ===
Note: Flags indicate national team as defined under FIFA eligibility rules; some limited exceptions apply. Players may hold more than one non-FIFA nationality.

No.	Pos.	Nation	Player
33	MF	IRL	Conor Sinnott (to Wexford)
—	DF	ENG	Curtis Ujah (to Tamworth)
—	FW	FRA	Pierre-Joseph Dubois (to Grays Athletic)

== Transfers ==
=== In ===
Date	Position	Nationality	Name	From	Fee	Ref.
12 July 2006	DF	(Nigeria)	Sam Sodje	Brentford	£350,000	
12 July 2006	MF	(South Korea)	Seol Ki-hyeon	Wolverhampton Wanderers	£1,500,000	
25 August 2006	DF	(Ecuador)	Ulises de la Cruz	Aston Villa	Free	
26 January 2007	GK	(Denmark)	Mikkel Andersen	AB	Undisclosed	
30 January 2007	DF	(Republic of Ireland)	Alan Bennett	Cork City	Undisclosed	
30 January 2007	DF	(England)	Greg Halford	Colchester United	Undisclosed	
31 January 2007	DF	(England)	Michael Duberry	Stoke City	Undisclosed	
24 April 2007	DF	(Cameroon)	André Bikey	Lokomotiv Moscow	£1,000,000	

=== Loans in ===
Start date	Position	Nationality	Name	From	End date	Ref.
11 August 2006	DF	(Cameroon)	André Bikey	Lokomotiv Moscow	End of season	
30 August 2006	DF	(Hungary)	Péter Máté	Debrecen	End of season	

=== Out ===
Date	Position	Nationality	Name	To	Fee	Ref.
11 June 2007	DF	(England)	Greg Halford	Sunderland	£2,500,000	

=== Released ===
Date	Position	Nationality	Name	Joined	Date	Ref
November 2006	MF	(Republic of Ireland)	Conor Sinnott	Wexford Youths	January 2007	
January 2007	FW	(France)	Pierre-Joseph Dubois	Grays Athletic		
January 2007	DF	(England)	Curtis Ujah	Tamworth		
30 June 2007	MF	(England)	Steve Sidwell	Chelsea	1 July 2007	
30 June 2007	MF	(Republic of Ireland)	Jonny Hayes	Leicester City	4 July 2007	

== Competitions ==
=== Overview ===
Competition	First match	Last match	Starting round	Final position	Record							
Competition	First match	Last match	Starting round	Final position	Pld	W	D	L	GF	GA	GD	Win %
Premier League	19 August 2006	13 May 2007	Matchday 1	8th	38	16	7	15	52	47	+5	42.11
FA Cup	9 January 2007	27 February 2007	Third round	Fifth round replay	4	2	1	1	9	7	+2	50.00
League Cup	19 September 2006	25 October 2006	Second round	Third round	2	0	1	1	6	7	−1	0.00
Total					44	18	9	17	67	61	+6	40.91

Last updated: 13 May 2007
Source: Competitions

=== Premier League ===
==== Results summary ====
Overall								Home						Away					
Pld	W	D	L	GF	GA	GD	Pts	W	D	L	GF	GA	GD	W	D	L	GF	GA	GD
38	16	7	15	52	47	+5	55	11	2	6	29	20	+9	5	5	9	23	27	−4

==== Results by round ====
Round	1	2	3	4	5	6	7	8	9	10	11	12	13	14	15	16	17	18	19	20	21	22	23	24	25	26	27	28	29	30	31	32	33	34	35	36	37	38
Ground	H	A	A	H	A	H	A	H	H	A	A	H	H	A	H	A	A	H	H	A	A	H	A	H	H	A	H	A	A	H	A	H	A	H	A	H	H	A
Result	W	L	L	W	W	D	W	L	L	L	L	W	W	W	W	L	D	L	L	D	L	W	D	W	W	W	W	L	L	D	L	L	D	W	W	W	L	D
Position	1	10	14	8	6	7	7	8	9	10	11	11	8	7	6	6	6	7	9	9	9	9	9	7	7	6	6	6	7	7	8	9	9	8	7	7	7	8

A = Away; H = Home; W = Win; D = Draw; L = Loss

==== Results ====
19 August 2006 1	Reading	3–2	Middlesbrough	Reading
15:00 BST (UTC+01:00)	Kitson 43'; Sidwell 44', (yellow card) 45'; Lita 56'	Report	Downing 11'; Yakubu 21'; Riggott (yellow card) 45'; Rochemback (yellow card) 61'; Boateng (yellow card) 90'	Stadium: Madejski Stadium; Attendance: 23,855; Referee: Mark Halsey

23 August 2006 2	Aston Villa	2–1	Reading	Birmingham
19:45 BST (UTC+01:00)	Ángel 36' (pen.); Barry 61'	Report	Doyle 4'; Sonko (red card) 33'	Stadium: Villa Park; Attendance: 37,329

26 August 2006 3	Wigan Athletic	1–0	Reading	Wigan
15:00 BST (UTC+01:00)	Heskey 38'	Report		Stadium: JJB Stadium; Attendance: 14,636

11 September 2006 4	Reading	1–0	Manchester City	Reading
20:00 BST (UTC+01:00)	Ingimarsson 23'	Report	Distin (yellow card) 22'; Reyna (yellow card) 52'; Sinclair (yellow card) 54'; Dabo (red card) 80'; Barton (yellow card) 90+1'	Stadium: Madejski Stadium; Attendance: 24,092

16 September 2006 5	Sheffield United	1–2	Reading	Sheffield
15:00 BST (UTC+01:00)	Hulse 61'	Report	Doyle 1'; Seol 25'	Stadium: Bramall Lane; Attendance: 28,288

23 September 2006 6	Reading	1–1	Manchester United	Reading
17:15 BST (UTC+01:00)	Doyle 48' (pen.)	Report	Ronaldo 73'	Stadium: Madejski Stadium; Attendance: 24,098

1 October 2006 7	West Ham United	0–1	Reading	London
14:00 BST (UTC+01:00)		Report	Seol 2'	Stadium: Upton Park; Attendance: 34,872

14 October 2006 8	Reading	0–1	Chelsea	Reading
17:15 BST (UTC+01:00)		Report	Ingimarsson 45' (o.g.)	Stadium: Madejski Stadium; Attendance: 24,025

22 October 2006 9	Reading	0–4	Arsenal	Reading
16:00 BST (UTC+01:00)		Report	Henry 1', 70' (pen.); Hleb 39'; Van Persie 50'	Stadium: Madejski Stadium; Attendance: 24,004; Referee: Alan Wiley

28 October 2006 10	Portsmouth	3–1	Reading	Portsmouth
15:00 BST (UTC+01:00)	Gunnarsson 10' (o.g.); Kanu 52'; Mendes 66'	Report	Doyle 84'	Stadium: Fratton Park; Attendance: 20,146

4 November 2006 11	Liverpool	2–0	Reading	Liverpool
15:00 GMT	Kuyt 43', 73'	Report		Stadium: Anfield; Attendance: 43,741

12 November 2006 12	Reading	3–1	Tottenham Hotspur	Reading
13:30 GMT	Shorey 38'; Sidwell 45'; Doyle 79'	Report	Keane 24' (pen.)	Stadium: Madejski Stadium; Attendance: 24,110

18 November 2006 13	Reading	2–0	Charlton Athletic	Reading
15:00 GMT	Seol 18'; Doyle 72'	Report		Stadium: Madejski Stadium; Attendance: 24,093

25 November 2006 14	Fulham	0–1	Reading	London
15:00 GMT	Pearce (red card) 16'	Report	Doyle 17' (pen.)	Stadium: Craven Cottage; Attendance: 22,673

2 December 2006 15	Reading	1–0	Bolton Wanderers	Reading
15:00 GMT	Doyle 33'	Report		Stadium: Madejski Stadium

6 December 2006 16	Newcastle United	3–2	Reading	Newcastle
19:45 GMT	Sibierski 23'; Martins 57' (pen.); Belözoğlu 84'	Report	Harper 37', 42'	Stadium: St James' Park; Attendance: 48,182

9 December 2006 17	Watford	0–0	Reading	London
15:00 GMT		Report		Stadium: Vicarage Road; Attendance: 19,223

16 December 2006 18	Reading	1–2	Blackburn Rovers	Reading
15:00 GMT	Harper 41'	Report	McCarthy 64'; Bentley 84'	Stadium: Madejski Stadium; Attendance: 23,074

23 December 2006 19	Reading	0–2	Everton	Reading
15:00 GMT		Report	Johnson 14'; McFadden 47'	Stadium: Madejski Stadium; Attendance: 24,053

26 December 2006 20	Chelsea	2–2	Reading	London
13:00 GMT	Drogba 38', 72'	Report	Lita 67'; Essien 85' (o.g.)	Stadium: Stamford Bridge; Attendance: 41,885

30 December 2006 21	Manchester United	3–2	Reading	Manchester
15:00 GMT	Solskjær 33'; Ronaldo 59', 77'	Report	Sonko 38'; Sodje (yellow card) 60' (yellow-red card) 69'; Lita 90'	Stadium: Old Trafford; Attendance: 75,910

1 January 2007 22	Reading	6–0	West Ham United	Reading
15:00 GMT	Gunnarsson 12'; Hunt 15'; Ferdinand 30' (o.g.); Doyle 36', 78'; Lita 53'	Report		Stadium: Madejski Stadium; Attendance: 24,073

14 January 2007 23	Everton	1–1	Reading	Liverpool
13:45 GMT	Johnson 81'	Report	Lescott 28' (o.g.)	Stadium: Goodison Park; Attendance: 34,722

20 January 2007 24	Reading	3–1	Sheffield United	Reading
15:00 GMT	Long 44'; De la Cruz 50'; Hunt 77'	Report	Gillespie (red card) 55'; Nadé 77'	Stadium: Madejski Stadium; Attendance: 23,956

30 January 2007 25	Reading	3–2	Wigan Athletic	Reading
20:00 GMT	Ingimarsson 31'; Long 51'; Lita 88'	Report	Heskey 3'; Landzaat 90+5'	Stadium: Madejski Stadium; Attendance: 21,954

3 February 2007 26	Manchester City	0–2	Reading	Manchester
15:00 GMT		Report	Lita 79', 89'	Stadium: City of Manchester Stadium; Attendance: 38,676

10 February 2007 27	Reading	2–0	Aston Villa	Reading
12:45 GMT	Sidwell 16', 90'	Report		Stadium: Madejski Stadium; Attendance: 24,122

24 February 2007 28	Middlesbrough	2–1	Reading	Middlesbrough
15:00 GMT	Viduka 7'; Yakubu 69'	Report	Oster 86'	Stadium: Riverside Stadium; Attendance: 26,412

3 March 2007 29	Arsenal	2–1	Reading	London
15:00 GMT	Silva 51' (pen.); Baptista 62'; Senderos (yellow card) 90+3'	Report	Kitson (yellow card) 42'; Fàbregas 87' (o.g.)	Stadium: Emirates Stadium; Attendance: 60,132; Referee: Chris Foy

17 March 2007 30	Reading	0–0	Portsmouth	Reading
15:00 GMT		Report		Stadium: Madejski Stadium; Attendance: 24,087

1 April 2007 31	Tottenham Hotspur	1–0	Reading	London
16:00 BST (UTC+01:00)	Keane 41' (pen.)	Report		Stadium: White Hart Lane; Attendance: 36,067

7 April 2007 32	Reading	1–2	Liverpool	Reading
15:00 BST (UTC+01:00)	Gunnarsson 47'	Report	Arbeloa 15'; Kuyt 86'	Stadium: Madejski Stadium; Attendance: 24,121

9 April 2007 33	Charlton Athletic	0–0	Reading	London
20:00 BST (UTC+01:00)		Report		Stadium: The Valley; Attendance: 26,271

14 April 2007 34	Reading	1–0	Fulham	Reading
15:00 BST (UTC+01:00)	Hunt 15'	Report		Stadium: Madejski Stadium; Attendance: 24,082

21 April 2007 35	Bolton Wanderers	1–3	Reading	Bolton
15:00 BST (UTC+01:00)	Shorey 64' (o.g.)	Report	Doyle 84' (pen.), 89'; Hunt 90+2'	Stadium: Reebok Stadium; Attendance: 23,533

30 April 2007 36	Reading	1–0	Newcastle United	Reading
20:00 BST (UTC+01:00)	Kitson 51'	Report		Stadium: Madejski Stadium; Attendance: 24,109

5 May 2007 37	Reading	0–2	Watford	Reading
15:00 BST (UTC+01:00)		Report	Shittu 60'; King 85'	Stadium: Madejski Stadium; Attendance: 23,294

13 May 2007 38	Blackburn Rovers	3–3	Reading	Blackburn
15:00 BST (UTC+01:00)	McCarthy 21'; Bentley 56'; Derbyshire 67'	Report	Seol Ki-Hyeon 36'; Doyle 58'; Gunnarsson 77'	Stadium: Ewood Park; Attendance: 22,671

==== League table ====
Pos	Team	Pld	W	D	L	GF	GA	GD	Pts	Qualification or relegation
6	Everton	38	15	13	10	52	36	+16	58	Qualification for the UEFA Cup first round (Note: Since both finalists of the FA Cup (Manchester United and Chelsea) and the League Cup winners (Chelsea) were qualified for the Champions League, their UEFA Cup spots were given to the 6th- and 7th-placed Premier League teams.)
7	Bolton Wanderers	38	16	8	14	47	52	−5	56	Qualification for the UEFA Cup first round
8	Reading	38	16	7	15	52	47	+5	55	
9	Portsmouth	38	14	12	12	45	42	+3	54	
10	Blackburn Rovers	38	15	7	16	52	54	−2	52	Qualification for the Intertoto Cup third round (Note: The highest-placed team who applied for the Intertoto Cup and not in an automatic UEFA Cup spot was awarded with a place in that competition. Blackburn Rovers occupied the Intertoto place, because Portsmouth and Reading did not apply. A further place in the UEFA Cup was up for grabs via the Premiership Fair Play League. The winner is placed into a draw with the winners of Fair Play leagues in other countries. The representatives from the two countries that come out of the hat first are given a place in the UEFA Cup first qualifying round. Since the winners of the Premiership Fair Play League, Tottenham Hotspur, had already qualified for the UEFA Cup by virtue of their league position, their place in the Fair Play draw was given to Aston Villa. However, the places in the UEFA Cup were awarded to the representatives from Finland and Norway.)

Source: Barclays Premier League
Rules for classification: 1) points; 2) goal difference; 3) number of goals scored.

=== FA Cup ===
9 January 2007 Third round	Reading	3–2	Burnley	Reading
20:00 GMT	Lita 27'; Long 37'; Sodje 55'	Report	Akinbiyi 69'; O'Connor 90+2'	Stadium: Madejski Stadium; Attendance: 11,514

27 January 2007 Fourth round	Birmingham City	2–3	Reading	Birmingham
15:00 GMT	Taylor 47'; Larsson 90+5'	Report	Kitson 3'; Lita 41', 79'	Stadium: St Andrew's; Attendance: 20,041

17 February 2007 Fifth round	Manchester United	1–1	Reading	Manchester
17:15 GMT	Carrick 45'	Report	Gunnarsson 67'	Stadium: Old Trafford; Attendance: 70,608

27 February 2007 Fifth round replay	Reading	2–3	Manchester United	Reading
20:05 GMT	Kitson 23'; Lita 84'	Report	Heinze 2'; Saha 4'; Solskjær 6'	Stadium: Madejski Stadium; Attendance: 23,821

=== Football League Cup ===
19 September 2006 Second round	Reading	3–3 (a.e.t.) (4–2 p)	Darlington	Reading
20:00 BST (UTC+1)	Lita 31', 35'; Máté 86'	Report	Johnson 19' (pen.); Joachim 34', 52'; Duke (red card) 73'	Stadium: Madejski Stadium; Attendance: 10,353
	Penalties
	Hunt (penalty scored); Little (penalty scored); Doyle (penalty missed); Long (penalty scored); Bikey (penalty scored)		(penalty missed) Holloway; (penalty scored) James; (penalty missed) Wainwright; (penalty scored) Johnson

25 October 2006 Third round	Liverpool	4–3	Reading	Liverpool
20:00 BST (UTC+1)	Fowler 44'; Riise 45+2'; Paletta 50'; Crouch 77'	Report	Bikey 75'; Lita 81'; Long 85'	Stadium: Anfield; Attendance: 42,445

== Statistics ==
As of match played 13 May 2007

=== Appearances and goals ===
No.	Pos	Nat	Player	Total		Premier League		FA Cup		League Cup	
No.	Pos	Nat	Player	Apps	Goals	Apps	Goals	Apps	Goals	Apps	Goals
1	GK	(United States) USA	Marcus Hahnemann	38	0	38	0	0	0	0	0
2	DF	(Scotland) SCO	Graeme Murty	24	0	23	0	1	0	0	0
3	DF	(England) ENG	Nicky Shorey	39	1	37	1	2	0	0	0
4	MF	(England) ENG	Steve Sidwell	37	4	35	4	2	0	0	0
5	DF	(Senegal) SEN	Ibrahima Sonko	23	1	23	1	0	0	0	0
6	MF	(Iceland) ISL	Brynjar Gunnarsson	27	4	23	3	2	1	2	0
7	MF	(England) ENG	Glen Little	28	0	18+6	0	0+2	0	2	0
8	FW	(England) ENG	Leroy Lita	38	14	22+11	7	2+1	4	2	3
9	FW	(Republic of Ireland) IRL	Kevin Doyle	34	13	28+4	13	1	0	1	0
10	MF	(Republic of Ireland) IRL	Stephen Hunt	38	4	28+7	4	0+1	0	2	0
11	MF	(Wales) WAL	John Oster	31	1	6+19	1	4	0	2	0
12	FW	(England) ENG	Dave Kitson	17	4	9+4	2	3+1	2	0	0
14	DF	(England) ENG	John Halls	2	0	0	0	0	0	2	0
15	MF	(England) ENG	James Harper	40	3	36+2	3	1	0	1	0
16	DF	(Iceland) ISL	Ívar Ingimarsson	42	2	38	2	3	0	1	0
17	MF	(United States) USA	Bobby Convey	12	0	8+1	0	3	0	0	0
18	DF	(Nigeria) NGA	Sam Sodje	7	1	2+1	0	2+1	1	1	0
19	MF	(South Korea) KOR	Seol Ki-hyeon	31	4	22+5	4	4	0	0	0
21	GK	(Republic of Ireland) IRL	Graham Stack	2	0	0	0	0	0	2	0
22	DF	(Cameroon) CMR	André Bikey	21	1	7+8	0	4	0	2	1
23	DF	(Ecuador) ECU	Ulises de la Cruz	15	1	9	1	4	0	2	0
24	FW	(Republic of Ireland) IRL	Shane Long	25	3	9+12	2	1	1	3	0
26	DF	(Kenya) KEN	Curtis Osano	1	0	0	0	0+1	0	0	0
28	DF	(England) ENG	Greg Halford	3	0	2+1	0	0	0	0	0
29	DF	(England) ENG	Michael Duberry	8	0	8	0	0	0	0	0
31	FW	(England) ENG	Simon Cox	1	0	0	0	0+1	0	0	0
32	GK	(Australia) AUS	Adam Federici	6	0	0+2	0	4	0	0	0
33	DF	(England) ENG	Scott Golbourne	1	0	0	0	1	0	0	0
35	DF	(Scotland) SCO	Alex Pearce	1	0	0	0	0+1	0	0	0
47	DF	(Hungary) HUN	Péter Máté	1	1	0	0	0	0	1	1
Players who left Reading during the season:

=== Goal scorers ===
Place	Position	Nation	Number	Name	Premier League	FA Cup	League Cup	Total
1	FW	(England)	8	Leroy Lita	7	4	3	14
2	FW	(Republic of Ireland)	19	Kevin Doyle	13	0	0	13
3	MF	(England)	4	Steve Sidwell	4	0	0	4
3	MF	(England)	10	Stephen Hunt	4	0	0	4
3	MF	(South Korea)	19	Seol Ki-hyeon	4	0	0	4
3	DF	(Iceland)	6	Brynjar Gunnarsson	3	1	0	4
3	FW	(England)	12	Dave Kitson	2	2	0	4
3	FW	(Republic of Ireland)	24	Shane Long	2	1	1	4
3				Own goal	4	0	0	4
10	MF	(England)	15	James Harper	3	0	0	3
11	DF	(Iceland)	16	Ívar Ingimarsson	2	0	0	2
12	DF	(Ecuador)	23	Ulises de la Cruz	1	0	0	1
12	MF	(England)	11	John Oster	1	0	0	1
12	DF	(Senegal)	5	Ibrahima Sonko	1	0	0	1
12	DF	(England)	3	Nicky Shorey	1	0	0	1
12	DF	(Cameroon)	22	André Bikey	0	1	0	1
12	DF	(Nigeria)	18	Sam Sodje	0	1	0	1
12	DF	(Hungary)	47	Péter Máté	0	0	1	1
				TOTALS	52	9	6	67

=== Clean sheets ===
Place	Position	Nation	Number	Name	Premier League	FA Cup	League Cup	Total
1	GK	(United States)	1	Marcus Hahnemann	13	0	0	13
TOTALS					13	0	0	13

=== Disciplinary record ===
Number	Nation	Position	Name	Premier League		FA Cup		League Cup		Total	
Number	Nation	Position	Name	Booked	Sent off (straight red)	Booked	Sent off (straight red)	Booked	Sent off (straight red)	Booked	Sent off (straight red)
1	(United States)	GK	Marcus Hahnemann	1	0	0	0	0	0	1	0
2	(Scotland)	DF	Graeme Murty	2	0	0	0	0	0	2	0
3	(England)	DF	Nicky Shorey	2	0	0	0	0	0	2	0
4	(England)	MF	Steve Sidwell	2	0	0	0	0	0	2	0
5	(Senegal)	DF	Ibrahima Sonko	3	1	0	0	0	0	3	1
6	(Iceland)	MF	Brynjar Gunnarsson	1	0	0	0	0	0	1	0
7	(England)	MF	Glen Little	1	0	0	0	1	0	1	0
8	(England)	FW	Leroy Lita	1	0	0	0	0	0	1	0
10	(Republic of Ireland)	MF	Stephen Hunt	4	0	0	0	0	0	4	0
11	(Wales)	MF	John Oster	1	0	0	0	0	0	1	0
12	(England)	FW	Dave Kitson	3	0	1	0	0	0	4	0
15	(England)	MF	James Harper	3	0	1	0	0	0	4	0
16	(Iceland)	DF	Ívar Ingimarsson	4	0	0	0	0	0	4	0
18	(Nigeria)	DF	Sam Sodje	3	0	0	0	0	0	3	0
19	(South Korea)	MF	Seol Ki-hyeon	3	0	1	0	0	0	4	0
22	(Cameroon)	DF	André Bikey	2	1	4	0	1	0	7	1
23	(Ecuador)	DF	Ulises de la Cruz	0	0	1	0	0	0	1	0
24	(Republic of Ireland)	FW	Shane Long	2	0	0	0	0	0	2	0
29	(England)	DF	Michael Duberry	1	0	0	0	0	0	1	0
32	(Australia)	GK	Adam Federici	0	0	1	0	0	0	1	0
Players away on loan:
Players who left Reading during the season:
Total				39	2	9	0	2	0	51	2

=== Awards ===
==== Premier League Manager of the Month ====
MONTH	Name	Award
September	(England) Steve Coppell	Won
November	(England) Steve Coppell	Won

==== PFA Young Player of the Year ====
Position	Name	Award
FW	(Republic of Ireland) Kevin Doyle	Nominated

==== Barclays Golden Glove Award ====
Name	Clean sheets	Award
(United States) Marcus Hahnemann	13	Third
