= Nicky Shorey =

English footballer (born 1981)

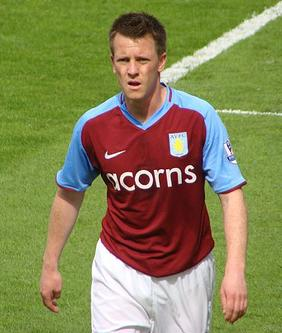
- Shorey playing for Aston Villa in 2009

Personal information
- Full name: Nicholas Robert Shorey
- Date of birth: 19 February 1981 (age 45)
- Place of birth: Romford, England
- Height: 5 ft 9 in (1.75 m)
- Positions: Left back; defensive midfielder

Youth career
- 1998–1999: Leyton Orient

Senior career*
Years	Team	Apps	(Gls)
1999–2001	Leyton Orient	15	(0)
2001–2008	Reading	267	(12)
2008–2010	Aston Villa	24	(0)
2009–2010	→ Nottingham Forest (loan)	9	(0)
2010	→ Fulham (loan)	9	(0)
2010–2012	West Bromwich Albion	53	(0)
2012–2013	Reading	17	(0)
2013–2014	Bristol City	14	(0)
2014–2015	Portsmouth	41	(0)
2015	Pune City	14	(0)
2016	Colchester United	15	(0)
2016	Hungerford Town	3	(0)
Total		481	(12)

International career
2007	England B	1	(0)
2007	England	2	(0)

Managerial career
- 2018: Wingate & Finchley
- * Club domestic league appearances and goals

Nicholas Robert Shorey (born 19 February 1981) is an English former professional footballer who played as a left back or a defensive midfielder.

After beginning his career at Leyton Orient, Shorey moved to Reading in 2001, where he made just under 300 appearances over seven years while helping the team reach the Premier League. He joined Aston Villa in 2008, but was limited to fewer than 40 appearances over two seasons. While with Villa, Shorey was loaned out to Nottingham Forest and Fulham. He joined West Bromwich Albion for £1.3 million in July 2010, making 53 Premier League appearances over two seasons with the club. After four years away from the club, Shorey rejoined Reading in July 2012, but could only manage 21 appearances when he joined Bristol City the following season. He spent just five months with City before joining Portsmouth in January 2014, and then Indian Super League club Pune City in the summer of 2015 for the forthcoming season. After playing in every match for Pune City, Shorey returned to England in January 2016 with League One club Colchester United. He finished his playing career with National League South club Hungerford Town.

Shorey has represented England at full international level on two occasions, with both appearances made at Wembley Stadium in 2007 against Brazil and Germany. He also made one appearance for the England B team.

== Club career ==
=== Leyton Orient ===
Born in Romford, London, Shorey grew up as a West Ham United fan. He started his career at Leyton Orient as an apprentice in 1998, where he signed his first professional contract in July 1999. He made his first-team debut during the 1999–2000 season as an 83rd-minute substitute during Orient's 1–0 Third Division defeat to Shrewsbury Town on 12 February 2000. He made his first start for the club on 7 March 2000 in a 2–1 defeat to Northampton Town. He made seven league appearances for Leyton Orient over the final three months of the campaign. He made nine further appearances for the club in the first half of the 2000–01 season, before making his final appearance on 20 January 2001 in Orient's 2–0 home defeat by Southend United.

=== Reading ===
Shorey joined Second Division club Reading initially on trial in February 2001 before signing a three-and-a-half-year contract on 10 February for an initial £25,000 fee, depending on appearances.

Shorey did not immediately break into the Reading first team until the 2001–02 season, when he made his debut starting in the Royals' 4–0 defeat of Luton Town in the League Cup first round on 21 August 2001. He made his next appearance, again in the Cup, on 10 October during Reading's 1–0 defeat by Aston Villa at Villa Park. From then onwards, Shorey established himself in the first-team, where he made 36 further appearances for the first-team and helped the club to second position in the Division Two table, achieving promotion to the First Division in the process.

Shorey remained a regular first-team member for the 2002–03 season, making 48 appearances across the campaign, including two appearances in the play-off defeats to Wolverhampton Wanderers. He scored his first professional goal on 29 October 2002 in a 1–0 win against Bradford City at the Madejski Stadium. He scored his second goal of the season on 15 April 2003 when he scored from the penalty spot during a 5–1 win against Preston North End.

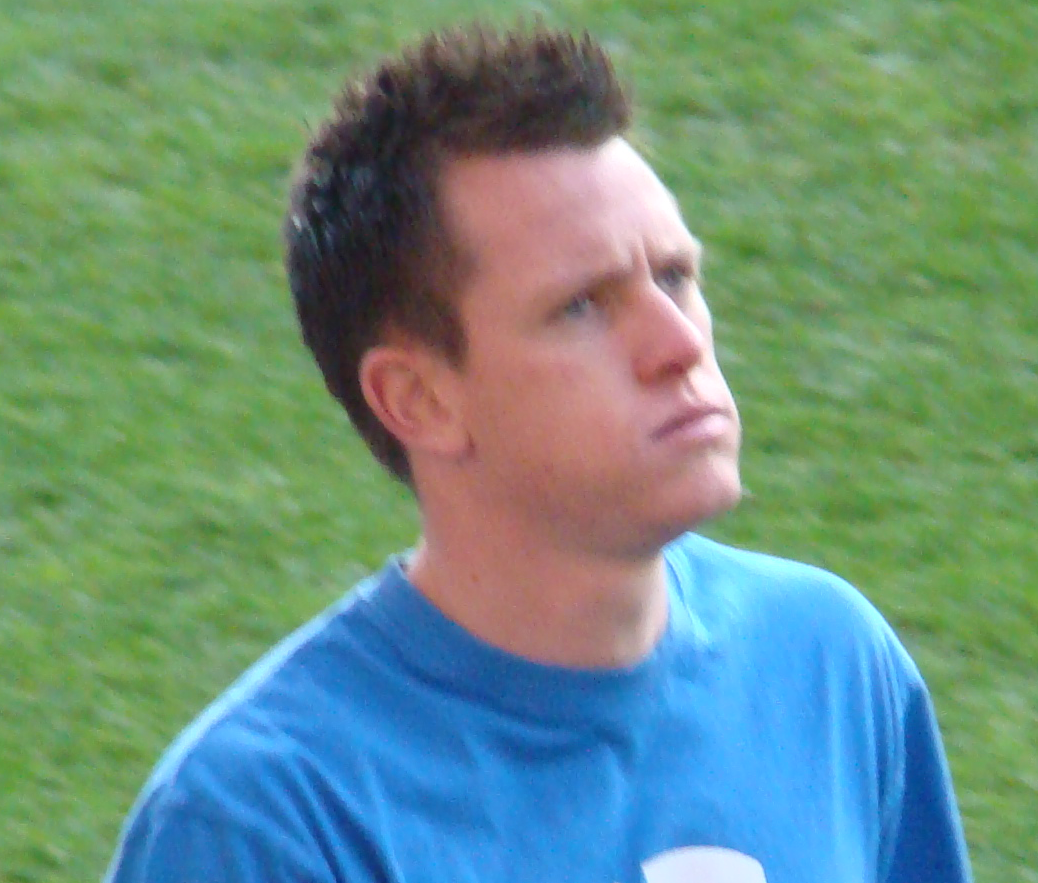
Shorey warming up for Reading in 2008

In the opening match of the 2003–04 season, Shorey was sent off during the 1–1 draw with Ipswich Town at Portman Road. He had another consistent season, racking up 41 league and cup appearances and scoring twice, once against Walsall on 28 December 2003 in a 1–1 draw, and another in a 2–1 win over Sheffield United on 28 February 2004. However, following the 0–0 home draw with Stoke City on 13 March, Shorey noticed that his foot has swelled and was throbbing, and by the time he reached hospital, the situation had become serious. Doctors had informed Shorey that they may need to amputate his foot. He received an intravenous drip in hospital for two weeks, and underwent treatment at his home for the following three months.

Shorey recovered in time to be involved in the first match of the 2004–05 season on 7 August 2004, a 3–2 home win against Brighton & Hove Albion. He scored three goals that season, with one in a 2–1 away defeat to Derby County, the only goal in a win away to Stoke, and the only goal in a win over Queens Park Rangers, on the way to making 48 appearances in all competitions.

In the 2005–06 season, Shorey was an important figure in the Reading team that won the Championship title and promotion to the Premier League with a record of 106 points. He also scored twice during the season, both of which were free kicks in consecutive matches against Norwich City and Crewe Alexandra. After making 44 appearances during the season, Shorey committed his future to Reading on 1 August 2006, signing a new deal to remain with the club until June 2009. He was named in the PFA Team of the Year for the Championship that season.

Shorey's transition from fourth tier to the top tier of English football was complete on 19 August 2006 when Reading hosted Middlesbrough at the Madejski Stadium. He played the full 90-minutes as Reading battled from 2–0 down to win 3–2. Shorey was nearly ever-present across the season, missing just one league match, while also scoring once during Reading's 3–1 win over Tottenham Hotspur on 12 November. Shorey was praised for his abilities not only defensively but also in going forward and his set piece play. An example of these abilities was seen in Reading's 6–0 win over West Ham United on 1 January 2007, with Shorey contributing to four of Reading's six goals. Owing to his impressive form during the campaign, helping Reading to an eighth-place finish in the Premier League table, Shorey was called up to the England B team by Steve McClaren for their match against Albania, and then became the first Reading player to represent the England national team in almost 100 years when he played in the first England match at the new Wembley Stadium on 1 June 2007. Shorey was runner-up to Ívar Ingimarsson for Reading's 2006–07 Player of the Season award.

Ahead of the 2007–08 season, Shorey was linked with a move away from Reading, with a number of Premier League club interested, while he had also reportedly turned down an improved contract offer from the club. Shorey later confirmed that he had no intention of leaving Reading despite the interest, although he later revealed he had made it clear to manager Steve Coppell that he wanted to move on, and a move a proposed move to West Ham United would have interested him but ultimately fell through.

Shorey's final season with Reading saw him make 39 appearances and score twice, once against Arsenal in their 3–1 defeat on 12 November 2007, and again in Reading's 2–1 home defeat by Aston Villa. Despite his near ever-presence, Shorey could not help his team from suffering relegation at the end of the season on goal difference.

=== Aston Villa ===
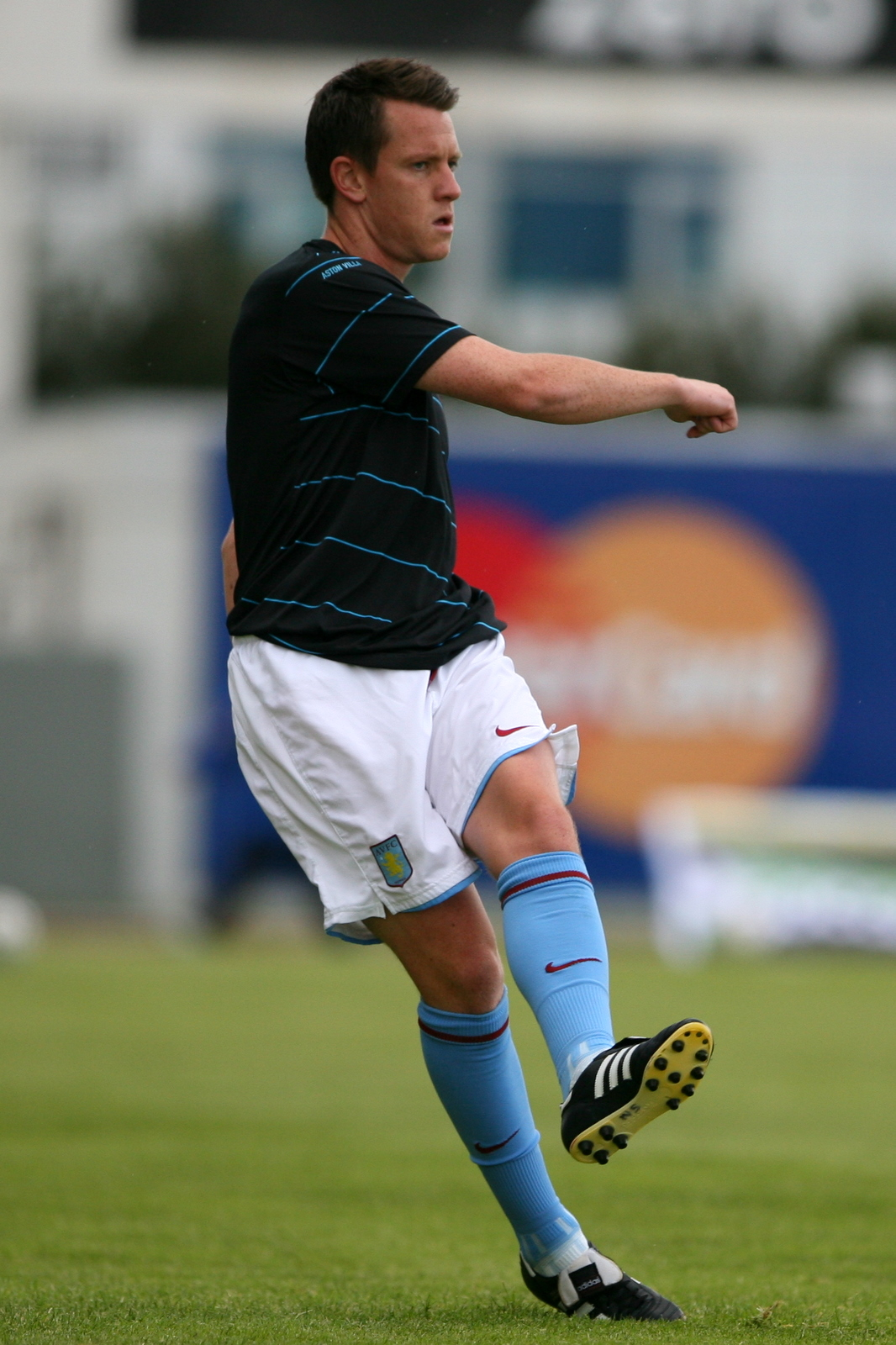
Shorey warming up for Aston Villa in 2008

On 7 August 2008, Aston Villa signed Shorey on a three-year contract for an undisclosed fee, but Shorey did not rule out a return to Reading later in his career. Providing cover for the injured Wilfred Bouma, Shorey made his debut in the UEFA Cup in Villa's 4–1 away win against Icelandic team FH on 14 August.

After an inconsistent first season with the club, making 33 appearances across four competitions, a number of media reports suggested that Shorey was unsure whether or not his future lay at Villa Park, despite manager Martin O'Neill claiming previously that he had plans for the former Reading defender. Nonetheless, Shorey began the 2009–10 season in the Villa first team, starting their four opening league matches. On 1 September 2009, Shorey was set to make a season-long loan move to Portsmouth. Having travelled to Fratton Park to conclude the deal, Shorey decided against making the move, instead remaining with Villa.

==== Nottingham Forest loan ====
After struggling to hold down a first-team place at Aston Villa, Shorey made a loan move to Championship club Nottingham Forest for one month on 24 November 2009. He made his Forest debut on 28 November in their 4–1 home win over Doncaster Rovers, quickly becoming a regular starter. His loan was extended on 31 December until the end of January having helped the team to three clean sheets in five matches. Shorey played his final match for the club on 16 January 2010 against his former club Reading, a match in which he was sent off after 68 minutes. With his loan deal expiring at the end of January, Villa manager Martin O'Neill said that he had no intention of selling Shorey during the transfer window.

==== Fulham loan ====
Fulham signed Shorey on loan until the end of the season on 1 February 2010, seeing the player make his Premier League return following his loan spell in the Championship. The move was made with a view to a permanent move in the summer if Shorey sufficiently impressed Fulham manager Roy Hodgson. He made his debut for the Cottagers on 3 February in their 1–0 win over Portsmouth, going on to make twelve appearances for the club. He was cup-tied for Fulham's run to the 2010 UEFA Europa League Final.

=== West Bromwich Albion ===
Roberto Di Matteo signed Shorey for newly promoted Premier League club West Bromwich Albion on 9 August 2010, joining on a two-year contract while the club had the option of extending the deal for a further year. The transfer fee was £1.3 million. Shorey made his club debut in a 1–0 home win over Sunderland on 21 August. He made 31 appearances during the 2010–11 season, and made a further 26 appearances in the 2011–12 season. Shorey was released at the end of his second season with the club after Liam Ridgewell became the first-choice left-back at the club. He left the club on 16 May 2012.

=== Return to Reading ===
Much to Shorey's delight, he made a return to Reading in July 2012, following his acrimonious exit from the club in 2008. He signed on 10 July a free transfer in a one-year deal following his release from West Brom. He made his second debut for Reading on 22 September when his team were beaten 1–0 at the Hawthorns by his previous club West Brom, before scoring his first goal since his return in his next match, a 3–2 League Cup win against Queens Park Rangers on 26 September. After making 21 first-team appearances for Reading across the campaign, he was one of ten players released by the club after they were relegated back to the Championship after only one season in the Premier League.

Following his release, Shorey joined Brighton & Hove Albion on trial in June 2013, before training with Millwall in July 2013.

=== Bristol City ===
Having spent part of August 2013 training with League One club Bristol City, it was announced that Shorey had signed a short-term deal with the club on 30 August. He made his club debut the following day as a second-half substitute for Bobby Reid in their 1–1 draw at Gillingham. After 17 appearances, Shorey was released at the end of his four-month contract on 30 December.

=== Portsmouth ===
On 9 January 2014, Shorey signed for League Two's Portsmouth on a contract until the end of the season. He made his club debut on 11 January in Portsmouth's 0–0 draw with Oxford United, going on to make 21 league appearances until the end of the season.

Shorey signed a new one-year deal with Portsmouth on 27 May 2014. He would make a further 23 appearances for the club during the 2014–15 season, but he was released by the club when his deal expired on 18 May 2015 alongside seven other players.

=== Pune City ===
In September 2015, Shorey opted to join Pune City for the second season of the Indian Super League, which would run from October to December. He made his debut in Pune City's 3–1 win against Mumbai City on 5 October, and played in each of Pune City's 14 league fixtures as they went on to finish in seventh position of eight teams.

=== Colchester United ===
Shorey returned to England following his stint in India joining Colchester United on 20 January 2016. He made his debut for the League One club on 13 February in Colchester's 4–1 home defeat by Swindon Town.

After making 15 appearances for Colchester in 2016, the club announced at the end of the season that Shorey would not be offered a new contract following Colchester's relegation to League Two.

=== Hungerford Town ===
National League South club Hungerford Town signed Shorey on 2 September 2016.

=== Stevenage ===
In October 2016, having made three league appearances for Hungerford, Shorey joined Darren Sarll's coaching staff at Stevenage, with whose squad he had also been training since August.

== International career ==
Following his good performances for Reading during the 2006–07 season, the Reading supporters introduced a "Shorey for England" song. As the season progressed, the media began to pay attention to the then uncapped player.

Shorey was called up to the England B squad to play Albania at Burnley's Turf Moor ground on 25 May 2007, and started the match before being substituted after 73 minutes with the score at 3–1 to England. He was replaced by Joleon Lescott.

Pundits had suggested that Shorey could make the step up to the senior squad, and on 26 May 2007, England coach Steve McClaren named him in his squad to face Brazil in a friendly match, and Estonia in a Euro 2008 qualifier. He made his full debut in England's first match at the new Wembley Stadium on 1 June 2007 as they drew 1–1 with Brazil, becoming the first Reading player in almost 100 years to represent the England national team at senior level.

Shorey earned his second and final England cap on 22 August 2007 in a 2–1 friendly defeat to Germany at Wembley Stadium.

== Managerial career ==
On 8 October 2018, Shorey and his former Reading team-mate Glen Little were appointed joint managers of Isthmian League Premier Division side Wingate & Finchley. This was short lived as on 29 October he left his managerial role for personal reasons.

== Other roles in football ==
On 2 July 2019, Shorey returned to Reading, taking up the role of Academy Lead Scout.

On 28 March 2022, he was appointed as Head of Recruitment at League One side Gillingham, a role he departed on 6 December 2022.

In August 2023, Shorey joined West Ham as their head of academy recruitment.

== Career statistics ==
=== Club ===
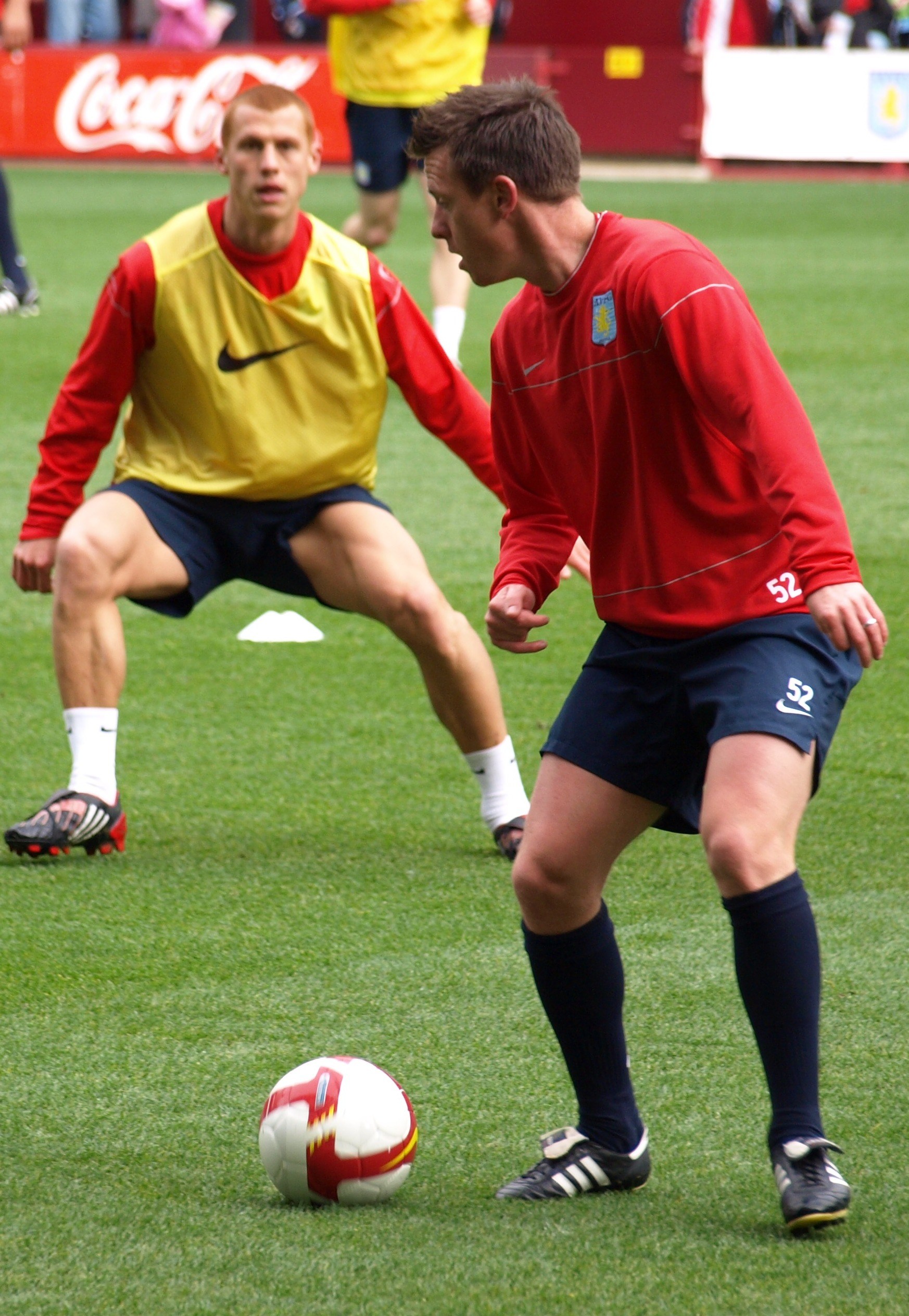
Shorey (right) warming up for Aston Villa in 2009

Appearances and goals by club, season and competition
Club	Season	League			FA Cup		League Cup		Other		Total	
Club	Season	Division	Apps	Goals	Apps	Goals	Apps	Goals	Apps	Goals	Apps	Goals
Leyton Orient	1999–2000	Third Division	7	0	0	0	0	0	0	0	7	0
Leyton Orient	2000–01	Third Division	8	0	1	0	0	0	0	0	9	0
Leyton Orient	Total		15	0	1	0	0	0	0	0	16	0
Reading	2000–01	Second Division	0	0	—		—		0	0	0	0
Reading	2001–02	Second Division	32	0	2	0	2	0	2 (Note: Appearance(s) in Football League Trophy)	0	38	0
Reading	2002–03	First Division	43	2	2	0	1	0	2 (Note: Appearances in First Division play-offs)	0	48	2
Reading	2003–04	First Division	35	2	2	0	4	0	—		41	2
Reading	2004–05	Championship	44	3	3	0	1	0	—		48	3
Reading	2005–06	Championship	40	2	1	0	3	0	—		44	2
Reading	2006–07	Premier League	37	1	2	0	0	0	—		39	1
Reading	2007–08	Premier League	36	2	1	0	1	0	—		38	2
Reading	Total		267	12	13	0	12	0	4	0	296	12
Aston Villa	2008–09	Premier League	21	0	3	0	1	0	8 (Note: Appearances in UEFA Cup)	0	33	0
Aston Villa	2009–10	Premier League	3	0	—		1	0	2 (Note: Appearances in UEFA Europa League)	0	6	0
Aston Villa	Total		24	0	3	0	2	0	10	0	39	0
Nottingham Forest (loan)	2009–10	Championship	9	0	—		—		—		9	0
Fulham (loan)	2009–10	Premier League	9	0	3	0	—		—		12	0
West Bromwich Albion	2010–11	Premier League	28	0	0	0	3	0	—		31	0
West Bromwich Albion	2011–12	Premier League	25	0	1	0	0	0	—		26	0
West Bromwich Albion	Total		53	0	1	0	3	0	—		57	0
Reading	2012–13	Premier League	17	0	2	0	2	1	—		21	1
Bristol City	2013–14	League One	14	0	1	0	1	0	1	0	17	0
Portsmouth	2013–14	League Two	21	0	—		—		—		21	0
Portsmouth	2014–15	League Two	20	0	2	0	0	0	1	0	23	0
Portsmouth	Total		41	0	2	0	0	0	1	0	44	0
Pune City	2015	Indian Super League	14	0	—		—		—		14	0
Colchester United	2015–16	League One	15	0	0	0	—		—		15	0
Hungerford Town	2016–17	National League South	3	0	—		—		—		3	0
Career total			481	12	26	0	20	1	16	0	543	13

=== International ===
Appearances and goals by national team and year
National team	Year	Apps	Goals
England	2007	2	0
Total		2	0

== Honours ==
Reading

- Football League Championship: 2005–06

Individual

- PFA Team of the Year: 2005–06 Championship
