= James Harper (footballer) =

English footballer (born 1980)

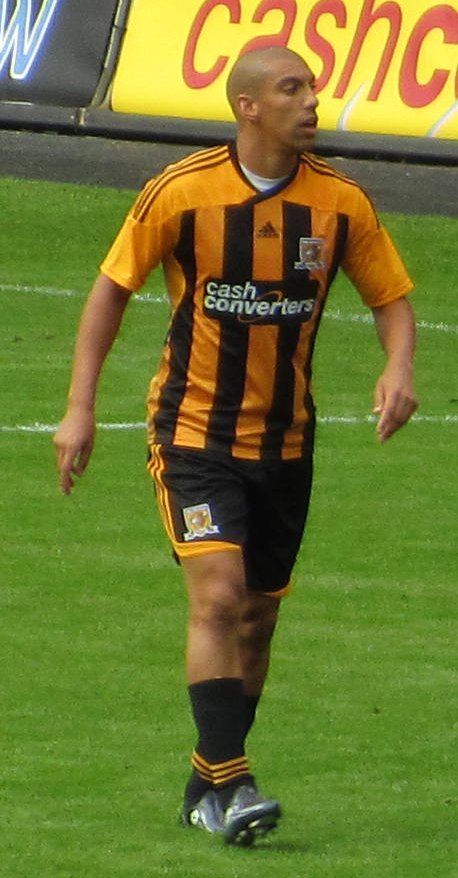
- Harper playing for Hull City in 2011

Personal information
- Full name: James Alan John Harper
- Date of birth: 9 November 1980 (age 46)
- Place of birth: Chelmsford, Essex, England
- Height: 5 ft 10 in (1.78 m)
- Position: Midfielder

Youth career
- 1994–2000: Arsenal

Senior career*
Years	Team	Apps	(Gls)
2000–2001	Arsenal	0	(0)
2000–2001	→ Cardiff City (loan)	3	(0)
2001–2010	Reading	312	(25)
2009–2010	→ Sheffield United (loan)	21	(3)
2010	Sheffield United	13	(1)
2010–2012	Hull City	29	(1)
2012	→ Wycombe Wanderers (loan)	5	(0)
2012–2014	Doncaster Rovers	27	(0)
2014	Barnet	6	(0)
2014–2016	Basingstoke Town	53	(0)
2016	Hayes & Yeading United	15	(1)
2016	Hungerford Town	1	(0)
2016–2017	Metropolitan Police	5	(0)
2017	Hendon	14	(0)
2018	Gosport Borough	10	(0)
2018	Walton Casuals	5	(1)
2018–2019	Gosport Borough	5	(0)
2019	Hendon	0	(0)
2019–2020	Uxbridge	9	(1)
2021	Windsor	0	(0)
2021–2022	Ascot United	8	(0)
Total		541	(33)
- * Club domestic league appearances and goals

James Alan John Harper (born 9 November 1980) is an English footballer who last played for Ascot United.

== Club career ==
=== Arsenal ===
Born in Chelmsford, Essex, Harper attended the Anglo European School in the nearby village of Ingatestone. He started his career as a trainee with Arsenal, but as his first team opportunities were limited, he first went on loan to Cardiff City, before signing permanently for Reading for an undisclosed fee said to be "a substantial six-figure fee" at the end of February 2001.

=== Reading ===
James had a real impact at Reading including playing a key role in a number of promotions, single handed defeat of Liverpool (Reading's only ever win over one of the premier leagues big four), and inexplicably wearing a shirt that was far too big for him. After helping Reading to win the 2005–06 Football League Championship, and thus win promotion to the Premier League, he scored his first Premiership goals for Reading in a clash with Newcastle United at St James' Park, scoring twice despite losing 3–2.

At the start of July 2007, Harper signed an improved three–year contract to keep him at Reading until the end of the 2009–10 season.

=== Sheffield United ===
Harper joined Sheffield United in September 2009, on loan until the end of the season. With his contract set to expire at the same time, Reading manager Brendan Rodgers admitted it was likely that he had played his last game for Reading. Harper duly made his début for The Blades in an away victory at Derby County just under a fortnight later. After being a regular in the first team from that point his loan deal was made permanent during the January transfer window, with Harper signing until the end of the season. Harper was a regular starter for the remainder of the season notching up four goals in the process. At the end of the season however his contract was not extended further and he was released.

=== Hull City ===
Harper began a trial with Hull City in early July 2010 following the arrival of Nigel Pearson as manager of the club. On 12 July 2010 it was announced that Harper had signed for Hull on a two-year contract. He made his league debut on 23 October in the home match against Portsmouth when he came on, just after half time, to replace Nolberto Solano. Harper scored his first goal for Hull City, with a long range strike against former club Reading in a 1–1 draw at the KC Stadium on 28 December 2010.

On 24 January he moved to Wycombe Wanderers on a month-long loan.

In May 2012 it was announced that his contract at Hull would not be extended and he was released by the club.

On 26 July Harper joined Hungerford Town of the Southern Football League Division One South and West where close friend Bobby Wilkinson was Manager. Harper featured in friendlies against Mortimer and Wokingham & Emmbrook to help build match fitness as he planned a return to league football.

=== Doncaster Rovers ===
On 17 August 2012 Harper signed a one-year deal with Doncaster Rovers and made his debut as a second-half substitute in a 3 – 0 win over Walsall the next day. He won a League 1 winners medal as Doncaster won promotion to the Championship. The following season Harper made no appearances for the club leading to him leaving by mutual consent in January 2014 in search of regular football.

=== Non-league ===
On 21 March 2014, Harper signed for Conference Premier side Barnet for the remainder of the season and made his debut in the 2–0 win over Hereford United at the Hive. After six appearances, it was announced that Harper was being released at the end of the season, although he was invited back for 2014-15 pre-season training at the Hive.

On 24 October 2014 Harper signed for Basingstoke Town, making his debut for the club on 8 November in the FA Cup first round replay at Telford United. Following some solid displays, he soon became a regular 1st team choice, making 31 appearances as Town reached the Conference South play-offs, narrowly missing out to Whitehawk at the Semi Final stage. The 2015/16 season was not so successful with the team performing poorly and sat with Basingstoke Town in 22nd position Harper was released by manager Terry Brown following a one on one meeting.

In March 2016, Harper signed for Hayes & Yeading United.

On 11 October 2016, Harper signed for Hungerford Town. After making just one league appearance for The Crusaders, he joined Metropolitan Police to make his debut in a Surrey Senior Cup loss to Kingstonian on 13 December 2016. On 3 February 2017, Hendon announced his signature.

On 16 March 2018, Harper joined Gosport Borough, making his début as a second-half substitute in a 2–5 defeat to Redditch United the following day.

Harper joined Walton Casuals for the 2018–19 season and scored on his debut against Shoreham in the FA Cup, as well as his league debut against Metropolitan Police. He re-joined Gosport for the rest of the season in October.

Harper briefly re-joined Hendon at the start of the 2019–20 season before joining Uxbridge.

On 16 September 2021, Windsor announced the signing of Harper. Eight days later, Harper signed for Ascot United. He made his début for the club in the 5–0 win over Burnham on 28 September.

== International career ==
Harper rejected the chance to go to the 2006 FIFA World Cup with Ghana, saying: "I've never even been to Ghana. I don't know the colour of their flag and it's not my country. I wouldn't feel right putting on the shirt." He qualified to play for Ghana because his mother was born there.

== Career statistics ==
=== Club ===
As of match played 29 March 2022

Appearances and goals by club, season and competition
Club	Season	League			FA Cup		League Cup		Other		Total	
Club	Season	Division	Apps	Goals	Apps	Goals	Apps	Goals	Apps	Goals	Apps	Goals
Arsenal	2000–01	Premier League	0	0	0	0	0	0	0	0	0	0
Cardiff City (loan)	2000–01	Division Three	3	0	0	0	0	0	0	0	3	0
Reading	2000–01	Division Two	12	1	0	0	0	0	2 (Note: Appearance(s) in Division Two play-offs)	0	14	1
Reading	2001–02	Division Two	26	1	1	0	3	0	2 (Note: Appearance(s) in Football League Trophy)	0	32	1
Reading	2002–03	Division One	36	2	2	0	0	0	2 (Note: Appearance(s) in Division One play-offs)	0	40	2
Reading	2003–04	Division One	39	1	2	0	2	1	—		43	2
Reading	2004–05	Championship	41	3	3	0	2	0	—		46	3
Reading	2005–06	Championship	45	7	3	0	3	0	—		51	7
Reading	2006–07	Premier League	38	3	1	0	1	0	—		40	3
Reading	2007–08	Premier League	38	6	1	0	2	0	—		41	6
Reading	2008–09	Championship	34	1	0	0	2	0	0	0	36	1
Reading	2009–10	Championship	3	0	0	0	2	0	—		5	0
Reading	Total		312	25	13	0	17	1	6	0	348	26
Sheffield United	2009–10 (Note: Part of this season was spent on loan from Reading)	Championship	34	4	2	0	0	0	—		36	4
Hull City	2010–11	Championship	28	1	1	0	0	0	—		29	1
Hull City	2011–12	Championship	1	0	0	0	1	0	—		2	0
Hull City	Total		29	1	1	0	1	0	—		31	1
Wycombe Wanderers (loan)	2011–12	League One	5	0	0	0	0	0	0	0	5	0
Doncaster Rovers	2012–13	League One	27	0	0	0	2	0	0	0	29	0
Doncaster Rovers	2013–14	Championship	0	0	0	0	0	0	—		0	0
Doncaster Rovers	Total		27	0	0	0	2	0	0	0	29	0
Barnet	2013–14	Conference Premier	6	0	0	0	—		0	0	6	0
Basingstoke Town	2014–15	Conference South	23	0	4	0	—		4 (Note: Two appearances in FA Trophy; two appearances in Conference South play-offs)	0	31	0
Basingstoke Town	2015–16	National League South	30	0	4	0	—		3 (Note: One appearance in FA Trophy; two appearances in Hampshire Senior Cup)	0	37	0
Basingstoke Town	Total		53	0	8	0	—		7	0	68	0
Hayes & Yeading United	2015–16	National League South	6	1	0	0	—		0	0	6	1
Hayes & Yeading United	2016–17	Southern League Premier Division	9	0	2	0	—		1 (Note: Appearance(s) in Southern League Cup)	0	12	0
Hayes & Yeading United	Total		15	1	2	0	—		1	0	18	1
Hungerford Town	2016–17	National League South	1	0	0	0	—		1 (Note: Appearance(s) in Berks & Bucks Senior Cup)	0	2	0
Metropolitan Police	2016–17	Isthmian League Premier Division	5	0	0	0	—		1 (Note: Appearance(s) in Surrey Senior Cup)	0	6	0
Hendon	2016–17	Isthmian League Premier Division	14	0	0	0	—		1 (Note: Appearance(s) in Middlesex Senior Cup)	0	15	0
Gosport Borough	2017–18	Southern League Premier Division	10	0	0	0	—		0	0	10	0
Walton Casuals	2018–19	Southern League Premier Division South	5	1	3	0	—		0	0	8	1
Gosport Borough	2018–19	Southern League Premier Division South	5	0	0	0	—		0	0	5	0
Hendon	2019–20	Southern League Premier Division South	0	0	0	0	—		0	0	0	0
Uxbridge	2019–20	Isthmian League South Central Division	7	1	0	0	—		5 (Note: Four appearances in Isthmian League Cup; one appearance in Middlesex Senior Cup)	0	12	1
Uxbridge	2020–21	Isthmian League South Central Division	2	0	0	0	—		0	0	2	0
Uxbridge	Total		9	1	0	0	—		5	0	14	1
Windsor	2021–22	Combined Counties League Premier Division North	0	0	0	0	—		1	0	1	0
Ascot United	2021–22	Combined Counties League Premier Division North	8	0	0	0	—		1 (Note: Appearance(s) in Combined Counties League Premier Challenge Cup)	0	9	0
Career total			541	33	29	0	20	1	24	0	614	34

== Honours ==
Reading

- Football League Championship: 2005–06

Doncaster Rovers

- Football League One: 2012–13
