= André Bikey =

Cameroonian footballer (born 1985)

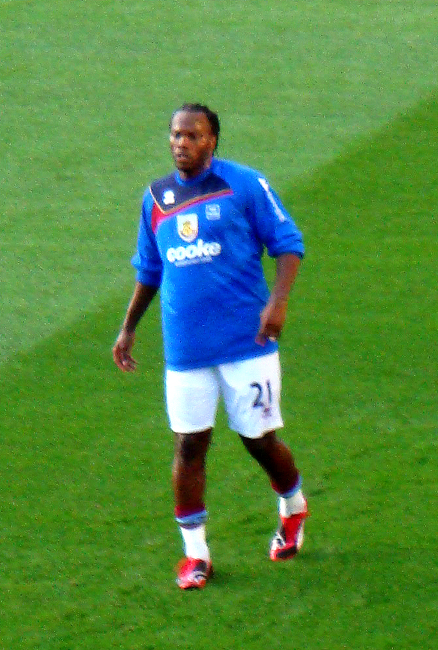
- Bikey on his Burnley debut in 2009

Personal information
- Full name: André Stéphane Bikey-Amougou
- Date of birth: 8 January 1985 (age 41)
- Place of birth: Douala, Cameroon
- Height: 1.82 m (6 ft 0 in)
- Positions: Defender; midfielder

Team information
- Current team: Zamalek SC (assistant)

Youth career
- 2000–2001: Espanyol

Senior career*
Years	Team	Apps	(Gls)
2001–2002	Espanyol B	0	(0)
2002–2003	Marco	13	(1)
2003–2004	Paços de Ferreira	2	(0)
2004	Aves	14	(0)
2004–2005	União de Leiria	0	(0)
2005	Shinnik Yaroslavl	11	(1)
2005–2007	Lokomotiv Moscow	14	(0)
2006–2007	→ Reading (loan)	15	(0)
2007–2009	Reading	47	(6)
2009–2012	Burnley	70	(3)
2012	→ Bristol City (loan)	7	(0)
2012–2013	Middlesbrough	33	(1)
2013–2014	Panetolikos	23	(2)
2014–2015	Charlton Athletic	31	(1)
2015	NorthEast United	9	(1)
2016	Pune City	0	(0)
2017	Port Vale	7	(0)
2017–2018	Jamshedpur	15	(0)
2018–2019	ATK	14	(1)
2020	CF Igualada	2	(0)
Total		324	(17)

International career
2006–2010	Cameroon	25	(1)
2008	Cameroon U23	4	(0)
- * Club domestic league appearances and goals

André Stéphane Bikey-Amougou (born 8 January 1985) is a Cameroonian former footballer who is an assistant manager of Egyptian club Zamalek. Primarily a defender, he could also play in midfield and was known for his physical presence. He is generally known by his first surname Bikey except between 2011 and 2012 while playing for Burnley when he decided to use his second surname Amougou.

He moved to Spain at the age of 15 to train with Espanyol before finding the opportunity of first-team football in Portugal with Marco in the 2002–03 season. He went on to have brief spells with Paços de Ferreira, Aves, and União de Leiria, before joining Russian club Shinnik Yaroslavl in 2005. He switched to Lokomotiv Moscow the following year. He joined English Premier League side Reading on a season-long loan in August 2006 before joining the club permanently for a £1 million fee in April 2007. He was sold to Burnley for £2.8 million in August 2009. He joined Bristol City on loan in March 2012 before joining Middlesbrough on a free transfer in August 2012. He moved on to Greek club Panetolikos in September 2013 before returning to England in July 2014 to play for Charlton Athletic. He moved to India in October 2015 after being recruited by NorthEast United and moved on to Pune City in July 2016. He returned to England to join Port Vale in March 2017 before going back to India five months later to play for a new club Jamshedpur. He switched to ATK in August 2018 and played for Spanish club CF Igualada in 2020.

He won a total of 25 caps for Cameroon, scoring one international goal. He was a squad member in three Africa Cup of Nations tournaments: 2006, 2008, and 2010. Cameroon finished as runners-up in 2008, though he missed the final after being sent off in the semi-finals for pushing over a stretcher bearer. He also represented the Cameroon Olympic team at the 2008 Summer Olympics.

== Club career ==
=== Spain and Portugal ===
Bikey left his native Cameroon to start his footballing career at Espanyol in Spain when he was 15. Still, he failed to make the grade at the Estadi Olímpic Lluís Companys and left without making a first-team appearance. He signed with Portuguese Segunda Liga side Marco, and made his debut in professional football in a 6–1 home win over Ovarense on 29 September 2002. He scored his first senior goal in a 3–0 home win over Felgueiras on 19 April. He played a total of 13 games during the 2002–03 season and was sent off for two bookable offences on the penultimate match of the campaign, in a 4–0 defeat by Farense at the Estádio de São Luís on 25 May.

He then joined Primeira Liga club Paços de Ferreira. He made his debut in the top flight in a 1–0 defeat by Marítimo at the Estádio da Mata Real on 13 September 2003. He played one further game for the "Beavers" before he followed manager José Manuel Gomes to return to the Segunda Liga to play for Aves. He played 14 games for Aves in the second half of the 2003–04 season and was sent off on the final day of the campaign after being shown two yellow cards in a 3–0 loss to Sporting Covilhã at the Estádio do CD Aves on 9 May. He went on to train with Primeira Liga side União de Leiria, though did not make a competitive appearance for the club.

=== Russia ===
Bikey moved to Russia to join Premier League club Shinnik Yaroslavl. He scored one goal in 11 league games for Oleg Dolmatov's "Black-Blues". His performances attracted the attention of Lokomotiv Moscow head coach Vladimir Eshtrekov, who signed him in July 2005. Lokomotiv ended the 2005 season in third place after finishing behind runners-up Spartak Moscow on matches won. He played for the club in the qualification stages of the UEFA Champions League, and was sent off in the competition as they were knocked out by Austrian side Rapid Wien. Lokomotiv dropped into the UEFA Europa League, and Bikey played for the club as they were knocked out by Spanish side Sevilla in the Round of 32. Bikey featured in five league games in the early part of the 2006 season. He was popular with supporters yet struggled to find a common ground with most of the teammates, and perceived himself as targeted for racist abuse to the extent that he felt it necessary to carry a gun whilst out in Moscow to protect himself from racist gangs. He was allowed to leave by head coach Slavoljub Muslin in August 2006, who said "he is a good player, he just doesn’t fit into our team".

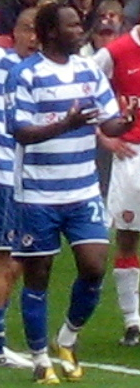
Bikey playing for Reading in 2008

=== Reading ===
Bikey joined English Premier League club Reading for an initial trial period during their pre-season trip to Sweden in 2006, where he impressed manager Steve Coppell despite being sent off in his final trial match for head-butting an Örgryte IS player. After much negotiation with Lokomotiv, a season-long loan deal was agreed on 26 August 2006, giving Reading the option to purchase the player at the end of the loan. He was sent off for receiving two yellow cards in only his second Premier League appearance, after pulling Didier Drogba's shirt in a 1–0 defeat to Chelsea at the Madejski Stadium on 14 October. He scored his first goal for the club in his return to action 11 days later, as Reading were knocked out of the League Cup after being beaten 4–3 by Liverpool at Anfield. He expressed a desire to obtain a permanent deal, and following improving performances, it was announced on 24 April 2007 that Bikey had signed a three-year contract with Reading for a transfer fee in excess of £1 million.

Bikey scored his first league goal for Reading in a 2–1 home defeat to Chelsea on 15 August 2007, which he celebrated with a triple somersault. He scored two more goals in a 2–1 home win over Birmingham City on 22 March. He ended the 2007–08 season with 24 appearances to his name. Still, he was unable to prevent the "Royals" from being relegated. Speaking in September 2008, Coppell bemoaned the fact that Bikey's international commitments had left him only able to train with the club for six days within three months. He scored three goals in 25 Championship games during the 2008–09 campaign as Reading qualified for the play-offs. However, he was sent off for stamping on Robbie Blake during the play-off semi-final first leg at Burnley on 9 May, having earlier conceded the winning penalty taken by Graham Alexander. He aggravated the situation by ripping off his shirt and stamping around the pitch, resulting in the extension of his ban to five games and a charge for improper conduct.

=== Burnley ===
Having beaten Reading in the play-offs, Burnley went on to win promotion into the Premier League, and manager Owen Coyle signed Bikey to a three-year deal on 18 August 2009. The fee was undisclosed, but was reported as being around £2.8 million. He scored his first goal for the "Clarets" in a 2–1 win over Birmingham City at Turf Moor on 3 October. He ended the 2009–10 season with 31 appearances to his name, playing mostly in midfield, as Burnley were relegated to the Championship. Speaking in August 2010, manager Brian Laws said that Bikey would be played at centre-half as he was more comfortable there and "could be one of outstanding centre halves in the division". Laws reportedly turned down an approach for Bikey from "a major European club" on transfer deadline day. Bikey went on to score two goals in 30 appearances across the 2010–11 campaign.

He was dropped by manager Eddie Howe at the start of the 2011–12 season. On 22 March, he secured a loan move to Championship rivals Bristol City until the end of the season. Manager Derek McInnes said he was "delighted" with his performances, and Bikey played in seven of the "Robins" last eight fixtures, in which City remained unbeaten, to help the club retain their Championship status. However, after returning from Ashton Gate to Burnley he learned that he would be released upon the expiry of his contract.

=== Middlesbrough ===
On 11 September 2012, Bikey signed for Middlesbrough on a free transfer after impressing manager Tony Mowbray on trial, who wanted cover for injured captain Rhys Williams. He made his debut in a 2–0 home win over Ipswich Town four days later. Mowbray praised him after the match. He scored his first goal for "Boro" with a header in a 4–1 defeat away to Blackpool. He made 37 appearances throughout the 2012–13 season, but left the Riverside Stadium after he was released in the summer.

=== Later career ===
In July 2013, he trained with the Spanish Segunda División team Sabadell. On 16 September 2013, Bikey signed a one-year contract with Greek Super League side Panetolikos. On 10 November, he scored both goals in the "Canaries" 2–1 win over Levadiakos at Panetolikos Stadium. He made a total of 26 appearances for Panetolikos over the course of the 2013–14 season.

In July 2014, Bikey returned to England to sign for Championship side Charlton Athletic on a two-year contract after impressing manager Bob Peeters on trial. He scored his first and only goal for Charlton in a 1–1 draw with Wolverhampton Wanderers at The Valley on 16 September. He featured 34 times for the "Addicks" in the 2014–15 season. Still, he was a peripheral figure after Guy Luzon took charge in January. On 31 August 2015, Bikey's contract was cancelled by mutual consent.

In October 2015, Bikey signed for Indian Super League team NorthEast United as a replacement for the injured Miguel Garcia. He featured nine times during the 2015 season, scoring one goal, as César Farías's "Highlanders" posted a fifth-place finish. In July 2016, Bikey signed for fellow Indian Super League side FC Pune City after being signed by Antonio López Habas. However, he was unable to feature for the club due to injury.

On 17 March 2017, Bikey once again returned to England and signed for EFL League One side Port Vale on a deal until the end of the 2016–17 season. He was signed by caretaker manager Michael Brown to provide cover for his only two fit centre-halves. Brown emphasized that Bikey was still recovering fitness from a quadriceps injury and that there was no timescale on how soon he would be able to play for the first-team. However, injury trouble with Remie Streete meant Bikey was forced to play despite struggling with fitness and hamstring problems of his own, and Bikey was in fact one of the "Valiants" better players towards the end of the season.

On 29 August 2017, Bikey signed with newly formed Indian Super League side Jamshedpur after being recruited by former Reading manager Steve Coppell. On 18 August 2018, he joined Steve Coppell at Indian Super League rivals ATK. He played two Tercera División games for CF Igualada in the 2019–20 season.

== International career ==
Bikey was named by head coach Artur Jorge in the Cameroon squad for the 2006 Africa Cup of Nations in Egypt, and won his first cap after coming on as a substitute for Raymond Kalla in a 2–0 win over Togo in a group stage game at Cairo's Military Academy Stadium on 25 January. He went on to play in the quarter-finals, and converted his penalty in the shoot-out defeat to the Ivory Coast on 4 February. He was dropped by new coach Arie Haan after the tournament, and then turned down a call-up under Jules Nyongha in March 2007.

He was named by Otto Pfister in Cameroon's squad for the 2008 Africa Cup of Nations in Ghana. On 31 February, he was sent off in the semi-final win over Ghana after a bizarre incident where he pushed a Ghanaian stretcher bearer in the dying seconds of the match. The medic in question, Samuel Ashia, said that "It was very forceful, and I landed badly. It didn’t hurt at the time but the next day my head ached and the area around my waist did, too... he hasn't apologised and I will be happy when he does, because no player should do that." Bikey was banned from the final and Cameroon were fined US$5,000 by the CAF. Egypt went on to beat Cameroon in the final.

He scored his first and only international goal in a 3–0 victory over Mauritius in a World Cup qualification match in Curepipe on 8 June 2008. He was named in Cameroon's squad for the 2008 Summer Olympics in Beijing. He played in all three group games as well as the quarter-final, where Cameroon were beaten 2–0 by Brazil in extra time at the Shenyang Olympic Sports Center Stadium.

He was named in the squad for the 2010 Africa Cup of Nations in Angola, and played in Cameroon's 3–1 extra-time defeat to Egypt at the Estádio Nacional de Ombaka in the quarter-finals on 25 January. However, he was benched for much of the tournament by Paul Le Guen and was not named in the squad for the 2010 FIFA World Cup. He was recalled by new head coach Javier Clemente and won the last of his 25 caps in a 3–0 friendly victory over Poland on 11 August 2010.

== Coaching career ==
On 27 July 2020, Bikey was named José Gomes' assistant at Spanish Segunda División side UD Almería. He joined Gomes again in 2022 to be his assistant at rival Segunda División side SD Ponferradina. He joined Egyptian club Zamalek as a coach in 2024, three months before they lifted the CAF Confederations Cup.

== Style of play ==
Primarily a defender, he could also play in midfield. He had great strength and athleticism, as well as good technical ability. He was described by the Middlesbrough Gazette as an "absolute monster, a physically imposing hulk with a massive turning circle who did a solid if sometimes erratic job at Boro but was always worth at least one heart-stopping moment of madness per game". He celebrated his goals with a hat-trick of somersaults.

== Personal life ==
In April 2007, it was reported that Bikey had a Portuguese wife and was a fan of British food and comedy, particularly Mr. Bean.

== Career statistics ==
=== Club ===
Appearances and goals by club, season and competition
Club	Season	League			National cup (Note: Includes Copa del Rey, Taça de Portugal, Russian Cup, FA Cup, Greek Cup, AIFF Super Cup)		League cup (Note: Includes Taça da Liga, Football League Cup)		Other		Total	
Club	Season	Division	Apps	Goals	Apps	Goals	Apps	Goals	Apps	Goals	Apps	Goals
Espanyol B	2002–03	Segunda División B Group III	0	0	0	0	—		0	0	0	0
Marco	2002–03	Segunda Liga	13	1	0	0	—		0	0	13	1
Paços de Ferreira	2003–04	Primeira Liga	2	0	0	0	0	0	0	0	2	0
Aves	2003–04	Segunda Liga	14	0	0	0	0	0	0	0	14	0
União de Leiria	2004–05	Primeira Liga	0	0	0	0	0	0	0	0	0	0
Shinnik Yaroslavl	2005	Russian Premier League	11	1	0	0	—		0	0	11	1
Lokomotiv Moscow	2005	Russian Premier League	9	0	1	0	—		10 (Note: Appearances in the UEFA Champions League and UEFA Europa League.)	0	18	0
Lokomotiv Moscow	2006	Russian Premier League	5	0	1	0	—		0	0	6	0
Lokomotiv Moscow	Total		14	0	2	0	0	0	10	0	24	0
Reading	2006–07	Premier League	15	0	4	0	2	1	—		21	1
Reading	2007–08	Premier League	22	3	1	0	1	0	—		24	3
Reading	2008–09	Championship	25	3	1	0	1	0	1 (Note: Appearance(s) in the play-offs.)	0	28	3
Reading	Total		62	6	6	0	4	1	1	0	73	7
Burnley	2009–10	Premier League	28	1	1	0	2	0	0	0	31	1
Burnley	2010–11	Championship	28	2	1	0	1	0	—		30	2
Burnley	2011–12	Championship	14	0	1	0	2	1	—		17	1
Burnley	Total		70	3	3	0	5	1	0	0	78	4
Bristol City (loan)	2011–12	Championship	7	0	—		—		—		7	0
Middlesbrough	2012–13	Championship	33	1	2	0	2	0	0	0	37	1
Panetolikos	2013–14	Super League Greece	23	2	3	0	—		0	0	26	2
Charlton Athletic	2014–15	Championship	31	1	1	0	2	0	0	0	34	1
Charlton Athletic	2015–16	Championship	0	0	0	0	0	0	0	0	0	0
Charlton Athletic	Total		31	1	1	0	2	0	0	0	34	1
NorthEast United	2015	Indian Super League	9	1	0	0	—		0	0	9	1
Pune City	2016	Indian Super League	0	0	0	0	—		0	0	0	0
Port Vale	2016–17	EFL League One	7	0	—		—		—		7	0
Jamshedpur	2017–18	Indian Super League	15	0	0	0	—		0	0	15	0
ATK	2018–19	Indian Super League	14	1	0	0	—		0	0	14	1
CF Igualada	2019–20	Tercera División	2	0	0	0	—		0	0	2	0
Career total			327	17	17	0	13	2	11	0	368	19

=== International ===
Appearances and goals by national team and year
National team	Year	Apps	Goals
Cameroon	2006	5	0
Cameroon	2007	3	0
Cameroon	2008	10	1
Cameroon	2009	4	0
Cameroon	2010	3	0
Total		25	1

Score and result list Cameroon's goal tally first, score column indicates score after Bikey goal.

International goal scored by André Bikey
No.	Date	Venue	Opponent	Score	Result	Competition
1	8 June 2008	Stade George V, Curepipe	Mauritius	1–0	3–0	2010 World Cup qualification

== Honours ==
Cameroon

- Africa Cup of Nations runner-up: 2008
