= Adam Bygrave =

English footballer

Personal information
- Full name: Adam Michael Bygrave
- Date of birth: 24 February 1989 (age 37)
- Place of birth: Walthamstow, England
- Position: Defender

Youth career
- ?–2007: Reading

Senior career*
Years	Team	Apps	(Gls)
2007–2008	Reading	0	(0)
2007–2008	→ Gillingham (loan)	15	(0)
2008–2009	Weymouth	16	(1)
2009–2010	Histon	34	(0)
2010–2011	Hayes & Yeading United	44	(0)
2011–2012	Farnborough	40	(2)
2012–2016	Hayes & Yeading United	18	(2)
- * Club domestic league appearances and goals as of 13:44, 11 September 2023 (UTC)

Adam Michael Bygrave (born 24 February 1989) is an English footballer who plays as a defender.

== Career ==
Bygrave joined Reading's Youth Academy as a junior, and on 6 July 2007, he signed a one-year professional contract with Reading.

Bygrave joined Gillingham on loan on 20 November 2007 initially for one month. He made his league debut in Gillingham's 2–1 win over Hartlepool United on 24 November 2007, and the loan was then extended for a second month, then a third, then finally extended to the end of the 2007–08 season. However, the loan was then cut short, and Bygrave returned to Reading on 22 April 2008.

He was released by Reading at the end of his current contract, and signed with Conference National side Weymouth on 25 May 2008. He signed for fellow Conference team Histon for a fee of £5,000 on 1 January 2009.

Bygrave signed for Hayes & Yeading United on 2 August 2010.

Out of contract at the end of the 2010–11 season, he followed manager Garry Haylock to Farnborough.

On 27 August 2012 he was sacked by Farnborough after being found to have made "numerous racist, disabled and paedophile based comments on social networking sites which are totally unacceptable in any walk of life," and became a free agent. He re-signed for Hayes & Yeading United in December 2012 after serving a football ban for the offence.
