= 2005–06 Reading F.C. season =

Reading
2005–06 season
- Chairman: John Madejski
- Manager: Steve Coppell
- Championship: 1st (promoted)
- FA Cup: Fourth Round vs Birmingham City
- League Cup: Fourth Round vs Arsenal
- Top goalscorer: League: Two Players (18); All: Dave Kitson (22)
- Highest home attendance: 23,845 vs Southampton (10 February 2006)
- Lowest home attendance: 6,941 vs Luton Town (20 September 2005)
Home colours	Away colours	Third colours

The 2005–06 season was Reading's 135th year in existence and fourth consecutive season in the Championship, since their promotion from the Second Division in 2002, and covers the period from 1 July 2005 to 30 June 2006.

Reading finished the season as Champions, winning promotion to the Premier League for the first time, and registered the highest points total gained in a professional league season with 106, bettering the previous record held by Sunderland by 1 point.

== Review and events ==
=== Pre-season ===
==== Transfers ====
Following the completion of the 2004–05 season Reading announced on 11 May that veteran duo Martin Keown and Les Ferdinand, along with Ricky Newman, Bas Savage and youngster Louie Soares would not have their contracts renewed and were free to leave the club. On 22 June striker Nicky Forster left the club after 6 years, opting to sign for Ipswich Town having turned down a new contract at Reading. He was followed in the days after by Paul Brooker and Lloyd Owusu who both moved to Brentford on free transfers. On 21 July Andy Hughes moved to Norwich City in a deal thought to be worth £500,000 and the next day Dean Morgan moved to Luton Town on a free transfer. The final summer departure from the Madejski was Shaun Goater who agreed to have his contract terminated by mutual consent on 27 July.

The first signings of the summer were Irish pair Kevin Doyle and Shane Long who joined from Cork City on 7 June. Stephen Hunt arrived from Brentford on a free transfer on 29 June and he was followed by Graham Stack who signed on a six-month loan from Arsenal on 7 July. Leroy Lita was signed from Bristol City for a then club record £1,000,000 on 14 July and on 22 July Brynjar Gunnarsson transferred from Watford for an undisclosed fee. On 2 August Chris Makin and John Oster both arrived on free transfers from Leicester City and Burnley respectively. Eric Obinna signed on a short-term deal on 24 August and Reading's summer transfer business was completed by Sekou Baradji who was signed on loan from West Ham on 1 September.

=== August ===
Reading's first match in the Championship was a home game against Plymouth Argyle on 6 August and despite dominating the game Reading lost 1 – 2. Having gone one down Leroy Lita equalised with a goal on his debut but a late finish from Nick Chadwick was enough to give Plymouth all the points. On 9 August Reading faced Brighton in the first of two away games with goals in each half for Glen Little and Dave Kitson enough for a 2 – 0 victory. Reading then faced a trip north to Preston on 13 August and a came away with a comfortable 3 – 0 win thanks to a brace from Lita and a second goal in four days from Glen Little. Reading returned to the Madejski on 20 August to face Millwall in a game they won emphatically 5 – 0. Bobby Convey scored two and one each from James Harper, Kitson and Steve Sidwell completed the scoring.

Reading faced Swansea City on 23 August in the first round of the League Cup. Kitson opened the scoring on 13 minutes but an 80th-minute equaliser from Adebayo Akinfenwa saw the game go into extra times with the score at 1–1. A second goal Kitson and one for Lita in extra time were enough to earn a 3–1 victory and progress into the second round. Reading were back in league action on 27 August away at Watford though neither team could make the breakthrough and it ended 0 – 0. The last game in August saw Reading at home in the league against Burnley. Leroy Lita put Reading into the lead on 7 minutes but Burnley equalised through Ade Akinbiyi. Kevin Doyle won the match for Reading with his first goal for the club on 70 minutes with the game finishing 2 – 1.

=== September ===
After a 12-day break Reading travelled to the Ricoh Arena to face Coventry City on 10 September. A second goal in two games from Kevin Doyle was only enough for a 1 – 1 draw with Rob Page equalising in the 86th minute. Three days later Reading faced Crystal Palace at home in a game they won 3 – 2. Kevin Doyle opened the scoring for Reading but Andy Johnson equalised shortly after and Clinton Morrison then gave Palace the lead at the start of the second half. However goals from Leroy Lita and Ibrahima Sonko were enough to secure the win for Reading. Next up was the visit of Crewe on 17 September which Reading won 1 – 0 thanks to a 78th-minute header from Ivar Ingimarsson. Reading were back in Football League Cup action on 20 September with a second round home tie against Luton Town. A single John Oster goal was enough to see Reading progress to the third round. On 24 September Reading traveled to Norwich City in the Football League Championship recorded and a third straight 1 – 0 win thanks to a goal from James Harper. The final game in September was at Southampton which finished 0 – 0 with both sides having chances but failing to make the breakthrough.

===October===

Reading continued their impressive form in October, winning five consecutive league matches. On 1 October, Reading defeated Sheffield United 2–1 at home, with Brynjar Gunnarsson scoring twice to cement their position at the top of the table. Reading also progressed in the League Cup, defeating Sheffield United 2–0 in the third round on 25 October.

== Squad ==
As of match played 30 April 2006

No.	Name	Nationality	Position	Date of birth (age)	Signed from	Signed in	Contract ends	Apps.	Goals
Goalkeepers
1	Marcus Hahnemann	(United States)	GK	15 June 1972 (aged 33)	Fulham	2002		190	0
21	Graham Stack	(Republic of Ireland) (Note: Graham Stack was born in Hampstead, England, but qualified to represent Republic of Ireland, making his Republic of Ireland Under-21 debut 2003.)	GK	26 September 1981 (aged 24)	Arsenal	2005	2008	8	0
28	Jamie Young	(England) (Note: Jamie Young was born in Brisbane, Australia, but qualified to represent England, Representing England at U-18, U-19 and U-20 level.)	GK	25 August 1985 (aged 20)	Youth team	2002		1	0
Defenders
2	Graeme Murty	(Scotland) (Note: Graeme Murty was born in Saltburn-by-the-Sea, North Yorkshire, England, but qualified to represent Scotland internationally through his parents, making his international debut for Scotland in 2004.)	DF	13 November 1974 (aged 31)	York City	1998		286	2
3	Nicky Shorey	(England)	DF	19 February 1981 (aged 25)	Leyton Orient	2001		219	9
5	Ibrahima Sonko	(Senegal)	DF	22 January 1981 (aged 25)	Brentford	2004		94	4
14	John Halls	(England)	DF	14 February 1982 (aged 24)	Stoke City	2006		3	1
16	Ívar Ingimarsson	(Iceland)	DF	20 August 1977 (aged 28)	Wolverhampton Wanderers	2003		130	7
18	Michael Dobson	(England)	DF	9 April 1981 (aged 25)	loan from Brentford	2005	2006	1	0
23	Chris Makin	(England)	DF	8 May 1973 (aged 32)	Leicester City	2005	2006	19	0
25	Johnny Mullins	(England)	DF	6 November 1985 (aged 20)	Youth team	2004		0	0
26	Curtis Osano	(Kenya)	DF	8 March 1987 (aged 19)	Youth team	2005		1	0
27	Aaron Brown	(England)	DF	23 June 1983 (aged 22)	Tamworth	2005		0	0
34	Scott Golbourne	(England)	DF	29 February 1988 (aged 18)	Bristol City	2006		1	0
Midfielders
4	Steve Sidwell	(England)	MF	14 December 1982 (aged 23)	Arsenal	2003		150	26
6	Brynjar Gunnarsson	(Iceland)	MF	16 October 1975 (aged 30)	Watford	2005		34	4
7	Glen Little	(England)	MF	15 October 1975 (aged 30)	Burnley	2004		84	6
10	Stephen Hunt	(Republic of Ireland)	MF	1 August 1981 (aged 24)	Brentford	2005		46	3
11	John Oster	(Wales) (Note: John Oster was born in Boston, England, but qualified to represent Wales, making his international debut for Wales in 1997.)	MF	8 December 1978 (aged 27)	Burnley	2005		41	2
15	James Harper	(England)	MF	9 November 1980 (aged 25)	Arsenal	2001		239	13
17	Bobby Convey	(United States)	MF	27 May 1983 (aged 22)	D.C. United	2004		67	7
20	Jonny Hayes	(Republic of Ireland)	MF	9 July 1987 (aged 18)	Youth team	2004		0	0
33	Conor Sinnott	(Republic of Ireland)	MF	9 July 1987 (aged 18)	Bray Wanderers	2006		0	0
Forwards
8	Leroy Lita	(England) (Note: Leroy Lita was born in Kinshasa, DR Congo, but qualified to represent England, representing England at U-21 level.)	FW	28 December 1984 (aged 21)	Bristol City	2005		32	15
12	Dave Kitson	(England)	FW	21 January 1980 (aged 26)	Cambridge United	2003		94	46
19	Kevin Doyle	(Republic of Ireland)	FW	18 September 1983 (aged 22)	Cork City	2005		51	19
24	Shane Long	(Republic of Ireland)	FW	22 January 1987 (aged 19)	Cork City	2005		15	4
31	Simon Cox	(England)	FW	28 April 1987 (aged 19)	Academy	2005		6	0
Out on loan
14	Simieon Howell	(Jamaica) (Note: Simieon Howell was born in Reading, England, but qualified to represent Jamaica, representing Jamaica at U-23 level.)	MF	26 August 1985 (aged 20)		2005		0	0
32	Adam Federici	(Australia)	GK	31 January 1985 (aged 21)	Torres	2005		0	0
Left during the season
18	Darren Campbell	(Scotland) (Note: Darren Campbell was born in Cambridge, England, but qualified to represent Scotland through his parents, representing Scotland at U-17 level in 2003 after representing the England U-17 in 2002.)	MF	16 April 1986 (aged 20)	Academy	2003		1	0
22	Peter Castle	(England)	DF	12 March 1987 (aged 19)	Academy	2003		1	0
27	Ryan Catney	(Northern Ireland)	MF	17 February 1987 (aged 19)	Academy	2003		0	0
29	Eric Obinna	(Nigeria)	FW	10 June 1981 (aged 24)	1. FC Kaiserslautern	2005		8	0
30	Sekou Baradji	(France)	DF	24 April 1984 (aged 22)	loan from West Ham United	2005	2005	1	0

=== On loan ===
Note: Flags indicate national team as defined under FIFA eligibility rules; some limited exceptions apply. Players may hold more than one non-FIFA nationality.

No. / Pos. / Nation / Player; 14 / MF / JAM / Simieon Howell (at Forest Green Rovers until 30 June 2006)	No. / Pos. / Nation / Player; 32 / GK / AUS / Adam Federici (at Carshalton Athletic until 30 June 2006)

=== Left club during season ===
Note: Flags indicate national team as defined under FIFA eligibility rules; some limited exceptions apply. Players may hold more than one non-FIFA nationality.

No.	Pos.	Nation	Player
18	MF	SCO	Darren Campbell (released)
22	DF	ENG	Peter Castle (to Rushden & Diamonds)
27	MF	NIR	Ryan Catney (to Lisburn Distillery)

No.	Pos.	Nation	Player
29	FW	NGR	Eric Obinna (to Stevenage Borough)
30	MF	FRA	Sekou Baradji (loan return to West Ham United)

== Transfers ==
=== In ===
Date	Position	Nationality	Name	From	Fee	Ref.
7 June 2005	FW	(Republic of Ireland)	Kevin Doyle	Cork City	Undisclosed	
7 June 2005	FW	(Republic of Ireland)	Shane Long	Cork City	Undisclosed	
29 June 2005	MF	(Republic of Ireland)	Stephen Hunt	Brentford	Free	
14 July 2005	FW	(England)	Leroy Lita	Bristol City	£1,000,000	
22 July 2005	MF	(Iceland)	Brynjar Gunnarsson	Watford	Undisclosed	
2 August 2005	DF	(England)	Chris Makin	Leicester City	Free	
2 August 2005	MF	(Wales)	John Oster	Burnley	Free	
24 August 2005	FW	(Nigeria)	Eric Obinna	1. FC Kaiserslautern	Free	
14 November 2005	MF	(Republic of Ireland)	Conor Sinnott	Bray Wanderers	Free	
30 December 2005	DF	(England)	Aaron Brown	Tamworth	Undisclosed	
30 December 2005	GK	(Republic of Ireland)	Graham Stack	Arsenal	Undisclosed	
6 January 2006	DF	(England)	Scott Golbourne	Bristol City	Undisclosed	
19 January 2006	DF	(England)	John Halls	Stoke City	£250,000	

=== Out ===
Date	Position	Nationality	Name	To	Fee	Ref.
30 November 2005	MF	(Northern Ireland)	Ryan Catney	Lisburn Distillery	Free	
31 January 2006	DF	(England)	Peter Castle	Rushden & Diamonds	Free	

=== Loans in ===
Start date	Position	Nationality	Name	From	End date	Ref.
7 July 2005	GK	(Republic of Ireland)	Graham Stack	Arsenal	6-month loan	
1 September 2005	MF	(France)	Sekou Baradji	West Ham United	2-month loan	
23 November 2005	DF	(England)	Aaron Brown	Tamworth	30 December 2005	
24 November 2005	DF	(England)	Michael Dobson	Brentford	Season long loan	

=== Loans out ===
Start date	Position	Nationality	Name	To	End date	Ref.
4 August 2005	MF	(Jamaica)	Simieon Howell	Forest Green Rovers	Season long loan	
9 September 2005	MF	(Scotland)	Darren Campbell	Tamworth		
December 2005	GK	(Australia)	Adam Federici	Northwood	One month loan	
10 January 2006	DF	(England)	Peter Castle	Rushden & Diamonds	Season long loan	
January 2006	GK	(Australia)	Adam Federici	Carshalton Athletic	Season long loan	
4 July 2006	MF	(Republic of Ireland)	Conor Sinnott	Limerick	November 2006	

=== Released ===
Date	Position	Nationality	Name	Joined	Date	Ref
November 2005	MF	(Scotland)	Darren Campbell	Colchester United	January 2006	
31 January 2006	FW	(Nigeria)	Eric Obinna	Stevenage Borough		
31 May 2006	DF	(England)	Johnny Mullins	Mansfield Town	Free	
30 June 2006	MF	(Jamaica)	Simieon Howell	Basingstoke Town	August 2006	
30 June 2006	GK	(Australia)	Jamie Young	Wycombe Wanderers	2 August 2006	
30 June 2006	DF	(England)	Chris Makin	Southampton	16 August 2006	

== Competitions ==
=== Overview ===
Competition	First match	Last match	Starting round	Final position	Record							
Competition	First match	Last match	Starting round	Final position	Pld	W	D	L	GF	GA	GD	Win %
Championship	6 August 2005	30 April 2006	Matchday 1	1st	46	31	13	2	99	32	+67	67.39
FA Cup	7 January 2006	7 February 2006	Third round	Fourth round	4	1	2	1	6	6	+0	25.00
League Cup	23 August 2005	29 November 2005	First round	Fourth round	4	3	0	1	6	4	+2	75.00
Total					54	35	15	4	111	42	+69	64.81

Last updated: 30 April 2006
Source: Competitions

=== Championship ===
==== Results summary ====
Overall								Home						Away					
Pld	W	D	L	GF	GA	GD	Pts	W	D	L	GF	GA	GD	W	D	L	GF	GA	GD
46	31	13	2	99	32	+67	106	19	3	1	58	14	+44	12	10	1	41	18	+23

==== Results by round ====
Round	1	2	3	4	5	6	7	8	9	10	11	12	13	14	15	16	17	18	19	20	21	22	23	24	25	26	27	28	29	30	31	32	33	34	35	36	37	38	39	40	41	42	43	44	45	46
Ground	H	A	A	H	A	H	A	H	H	A	A	H	H	H	A	H	H	A	H	A	A	H	H	A	A	H	A	H	H	A	H	A	H	A	A	H	A	H	H	A	H	A	A	H	A	H
Result	L	W	W	W	D	W	D	W	W	W	D	W	W	D	W	D	W	W	W	W	W	W	W	W	W	W	D	W	W	D	W	W	W	D	L	W	W	D	D	D	W	W	D	W	D	W
Position	21	18	4	1	2	2	2	2	2	2	2	2	2	2	2	2	2	2	1	1	1	1	1	1	1	1	1	1	1	1	1	1	1	1	1	1	1	1	1	1	1	1	1	1	1	1

A = Away; H = Home; W = Win; D = Draw; L = Loss

==== Results ====
6 August 2005 1	Reading	1–2	Plymouth Argyle	Madejski Stadium
15:00 BST (UTC+1)	Lita 54'	Report	Evans 21'; Chadwick 90'	Attendance: 16,836; Referee: Paul Taylor

9 August 2005 2	Brighton & Hove Albion	0–2	Reading	Withdean Stadium
19:45 BST (UTC+1)		Report	Little 15'; Kitson 63'	Attendance: 6,676; Referee: Kevin Friend

13 August 2005 3	Preston North End	0–3	Reading	Deepdale
15:00 BST (UTC+1)		Report	Lita 35', 46'; Little 58'	Attendance: 13,154; Referee: Lee Probert

20 August 2005 4	Reading	5–0	Millwall	Madejski Stadium
15:00 BST (UTC+1)	Convey 6', 25'; Harper 38'; Kitson 44'; Sidwell 79'	Report	Marshall (red card) 23'	Attendance: 14,225; Referee: Steve Tanner

27 August 2005 5	Watford	0–0	Reading	Vicarage Road
17:15 BST (UTC+1)		Report		Attendance: 12,152; Referee: Richard Beeby

29 August 2005 6	Reading	2–1	Burnley	Madejski Stadium
15:00 BST (UTC+1)	Lita 8'; Doyle 70'	Report	Akinbiyi 40'	Attendance: 14,027; Referee: Ray Olivier

10 September 2005 7	Coventry City	1–1	Reading	Ricoh Arena
15:00 BST (UTC+1)	Page 86'	Report	Doyle 68'	Attendance: 22,074; Referee: Andy Hall

13 September 2005 8	Reading	3–2	Crystal Palace	Madejski Stadium
20:00 BST (UTC+1)	Doyle 26'; Lita 68'; Sonko 87'	Report	Johnson 29'; Morrison 47'	Attendance: 17,562; Referee: Brian Curson

17 September 2005 9	Reading	1–0	Crewe Alexandra	Madejski Stadium
15:00 BST (UTC+1)	Ingimarsson 78'	Report		Attendance: 17,668; Referee: Andy Woolmer

24 September 2005 10	Norwich City	0–1	Reading	Carrow Road
15:00 BST (UTC+1)		Report	Harper 61'	Attendance: 24,850; Referee: Trevor Kettle

28 September 2005 11	Southampton	0–0	Reading	St Mary's
19:45 BST (UTC+1)		Report		Attendance: 24,946; Referee: Graham Poll

1 October 2005 12	Reading	2–1	Sheffield United	Madejski Stadium
15:00 BST (UTC+1)	Gunnarsson 3', 88'	Report	Kabba 15'	Attendance: 22,068; Referee: Grant Hegley

16 October 2005 13	Reading	2–0	Ipswich Town	Madejski Stadium
13:30 BST (UTC+1)	Naylor 18' (o.g.); Doyle 47'	Report		Attendance: 17,581; Referee: Steve Tanner

18 October 2005 14	Hull City	1–1	Reading	KC Stadium
19:45 BST (UTC+1)	Brown 56'	Report	Little 74'	Attendance: 17,698

22 October 2005 15	Stoke City	0–1	Reading	Britannia Stadium
15:00 BST (UTC+1)		Report	Kitson 75' (pen.)	Attendance: 13,484

29 October 2005 16	Reading	1–1	Leeds United	Madejski Stadium
15:00 BST (UTC+1)	Gunnarsson 62'	Report	Ingimarsson 74' (o.g.)	Attendance: 22,012

1 November 2005 17	Reading	2–0	Sheffield Wednesday	Madejski Stadium
20:00 GMT	Whelan 38' (o.g.); Kitson 64'	Report		Attendance: 16,188

5 November 2005 18	Queens Park Rangers	1–2	Reading	Loftus Road
15:00 GMT	Cook 47'	Report	Harper 10'; Ingimarsson 65'	Attendance: 15,347

19 November 2005 19	Reading	3–1	Hull City	Madejski Stadium
15:00 GMT	Convey 7'; Doyle 69'; Little 70'	Report	Barmby 55'	Attendance: 17,864

22 November 2005 20	Ipswich Town	0–3	Reading	Portman Road
19:45 GMT		Report	Sidwell 28'; Lita 53'; Doyle 76'	Attendance: 22,62

26 November 2005 21	Plymouth Argyle	0–2	Reading	Home Park
15:00 GMT		Report	Little 20'; Doyle 56'	Attendance: 14,020

3 December 2005 22	Reading	3–0	Luton Town	Madejski Stadium
15:00 GMT	Sidwell 43'; Kitson 75'; Doyle 88'	Report		Attendance: 19,478

10 December 2005 23	Reading	5–1	Brighton & Hove Albion	Madejski Stadium
15:00 GMT	Oatway 27' (o.g.); Kitson 51' (pen.), 70', 90'; Hunt 76'	Report	Elphick (red card) 48'; Kazim-Richards 84'	Attendance: 18,546

17 December 2005 24	Millwall	0–2	Reading	The Den
15:00 GMT		Report	Sidwell 40'; Doyle 68'	Attendance: 12,920

26 December 2005 25	Wolverhampton Wanderers	0–2	Reading	Molineux
15:00 GMT		Report	Kitson 29'; Convey 64'	Attendance: 27,980

28 December 2005 26	Reading	2–0	Leicester City	Madejski Stadium
20:00 GMT	Doyle 60'; Gunnarsson 87'	Report		Attendance: 22,061

31 December 2005 27	Derby County	2–2	Reading	Pride Park
17:15 GMT	Johnson 32', 62'; Davies (yellow card) (yellow-red card) 71'	Report	Doyle 34'; Long 88'	Attendance: 21,434

2 January 2006 28	Reading	5–1	Cardiff City	Madejski Stadium
15:00 GMT	Sidwell 10', 70'; Sonko 31'; Kitson 50', 75'	Report	Jerome 61'	Attendance: 22,668

14 January 2006 29	Reading	2–0	Coventry City	Madejski Stadium
15:00 GMT	Kitson 46', 78'	Report		Attendance: 22,813

20 January 2006 30	Crystal Palace	1–1	Reading	Selhurst Park
19:45 GMT	Johnson 79' (pen.)	Report	Harper 81'	Attendance: 19,888

31 January 2006 31	Reading	4–0	Norwich City	Madejski Stadium
20:00 GMT	Shorey 6'; Sidwell 17'; Lita 55'; Convey 69'	Report		Attendance: 21,442

4 February 2006 32	Crewe Alexandra	3–4	Reading	Alexandra Stadium
15:00 GMT	Bell 14'; Taylor 50'; Lunt 68' (pen.)	Report	Shorey 24'; Sidwell 26'; Lita 43', 53'	Attendance: 6,484

10 February 2006 33	Reading	2–0	Southampton	Madejski Stadium
19:45 GMT	Lita 16'; Doyle 38'	Report		Attendance: 23,845

14 February 2006 34	Sheffield United	1–1	Reading	Bramall Lane
19:45 GMT	Dyer 9'	Report	Kitson 12'	Attendance: 25,011

17 February 2006 35	Luton Town	3–2	Reading	Kenilworth Road
19:45 GMT	Vine 20', 26'; Morgan 51'	Report	Doyle 1', 90'	Attendance: 8,705

25 February 2006 36	Reading	2–1	Preston North End	Madejski Stadium
15:00 GMT	Sidwell 6'; Lita 45+1'	Report	Davidson 8'	Attendance: 23,011

4 March 2006 37	Burnley	0–3	Reading	Turf Moor
15:00 GMT		Report	Convey 10'; Sonko 55'; Kitson 90'	Attendance: 12,888

11 March 2006 38	Reading	0–0	Watford	Madejski Stadium
15:00 GMT		Report		Attendance: 23,724

18 March 2006 39	Reading	1–1	Wolverhampton Wanderers	Madejski Stadium
15:00 GMT	Convey 22'	Report	Miller 64'	Attendance: 23,502

25 March 2006 40	Leicester City	1–1	Reading	Walkers Stadium
15:00 GMT	Hume 38'	Report	Doyle 85'	Attendance: 25,578

1 April 2006 41	Reading	5–0	Derby County	Madejski Stadium
15:00 BST (UTC+1)	Harper 59'; Doyle 65'; Oster 69'; Long 73', 83'	Report		Attendance: 22,981

8 April 2006 42	Cardiff City	2–5	Reading	Ninian Park
15:00 BST (UTC+1)	Jerome 40'; Parry 79'	Report	Harper 10', 90'; Kitson 40'; Loovens 52' (o.g.); Doyle 87'	Attendance: 11,866

15 April 2006 43	Leeds United	1–1	Reading	Elland Road
15:00 BST (UTC+1)	Hulse 47'	Report	Hunt 85'	Attendance: 24,535

17 April 2006 44	Reading	3–1	Stoke City	Madejski Stadium
15:00 BST (UTC+1)	Sidwell 25'; Doyle 56' (pen.); Halls 62'	Report	Rooney 59'	Attendance: 22,119

22 April 2006 45	Sheffield Wednesday	1–1	Reading	Hillsborough
15:00 BST (UTC+1)	MacLean 59' (pen.)	Report	Kitson 34'	Attendance: 27,307

30 April 2006 46	Reading	2–1	Queens Park Rangers	Madejski Stadium
13:30 BST (UTC+1)	Kitson 40'; Murty 84' (pen.)	Report	Furlong 72'	Attendance: 23,156

==== League table ====
Pos	Team	Pld	W	D	L	GF	GA	GD	Pts	Promotion, qualification or relegation
1	Reading (C, P)	46	31	13	2	99	32	+67	106	Promotion to the FA Premier League
2	Sheffield United (P)	46	26	12	8	76	46	+30	90	Promotion to the FA Premier League
3	Watford (O, P)	46	22	15	9	77	53	+24	81	Qualification for Championship play-offs
4	Preston North End	46	20	20	6	59	30	+29	80	Qualification for Championship play-offs
5	Leeds United	46	21	15	10	57	38	+19	78	Qualification for Championship play-offs

Updated to match(es) played on 2 December 2011. Source: RSSSF
Rules for classification: 1) points; 2) goal difference; 3) number of goals scored.
(C) Champions; (O) Play-off winners; (P) Promoted

=== FA Cup ===
7 January 2006 Third Round	West Bromwich Albion	1–1	Reading	The Hawthorns
15:00 GMT	Gera 82' (pen.)	Report	Doyle 84' (pen.)	Attendance: 19,197; Referee: Matt Messias

17 January 2006 Third Round Replay	Reading	3–2 (a.e.t.)	West Bromwich Albion	Madejski Stadium
20:00 GMT	Lita 50', 65', 93'	Report	Chaplow 9', 32'	Attendance: 16,737; Referee: Paul Taylor

28 January 2006 Fourth Round	Reading	1–1	Birmingham City	Madejski Stadium
15:00 GMT	Long 32'	Report	Dunn 67'	Attendance: 23,762; Referee: Rob Styles

7 February 2006 Fourth Round Replay	Birmingham City	2–1	Reading	St. Andrews
19:45 GMT	Forssell 30'; Gray 67'	Report	Hunt 51'	Attendance: 16,644; Referee: Peter Walton

=== Football League Cup ===
23 August 2005 First Round	Reading	3–1 (a.e.t.)	Swansea City	Madejski Stadium
20:00 BST (UTC+1)	Kitson 13', 95'; Lita 114'	Report	Akinfenwa 80'; Anderson (red card) 85'	Attendance: 7,603; Referee: Keith Stroud

20 September 2005 Second Round	Reading	1–0	Luton Town	Madejski Stadium
20:00 BST (UTC+1)	Oster 80'	Report		Attendance: 6,941; Referee: Mick Fletcher

25 October 2005 Third Round	Reading	2–0	Sheffield United	Madejski Stadium
20:00 BST (UTC+1)	Kitson 53', 75'	Report		Attendance: 11,607; Referee: Rob Styles

29 November 2005 Fourth Round	Arsenal	3–0	Reading	Highbury
19:45 GMT	Reyes 12'; Van Persie 41'; Lupoli 65'	Report		Attendance: 36,167; Referee: Lee Mason

== Squad statistics ==
As of match played 30 April 2006

=== Appearances and goals ===
No.	Pos	Nat	Player	Total		Championship		FA Cup		League Cup	
No.	Pos	Nat	Player	Apps	Goals	Apps	Goals	Apps	Goals	Apps	Goals
1	GK	(United States) USA	Marcus Hahnemann	47	0	45	0	0	0	1+1	0
2	DF	(Scotland) SCO	Graeme Murty	44	1	40	1	1	0	3	0
3	DF	(England) ENG	Nicky Shorey	44	2	40	2	1	0	3	0
4	MF	(England) ENG	Steve Sidwell	40	10	29+4	10	4	0	3	0
5	DF	(Senegal) SEN	Ibrahima Sonko	52	3	46	3	2	0	4	0
6	MF	(Iceland) ISL	Brynjar Gunnarsson	34	4	19+10	4	4	0	0+1	0
7	MF	(England) ENG	Glen Little	38	5	34+1	5	0+1	0	0+2	0
8	FW	(England) ENG	Leroy Lita	32	15	22+4	11	2+1	3	1+2	1
10	MF	(Republic of Ireland) IRL	Stephen Hunt	46	3	3+35	2	4	1	4	0
11	MF	(Wales) WAL	John Oster	41	2	11+22	1	4	0	4	1
12	FW	(England) ENG	Dave Kitson	39	22	27+7	18	2	0	3	4
14	DF	(England) ENG	John Halls	3	1	1	1	2	0	0	0
15	MF	(England) ENG	James Harper	51	7	44+1	7	3	0	3	0
16	DF	(Iceland) ISL	Ívar Ingimarsson	53	2	46	2	3	0	4	0
17	MF	(United States) USA	Bobby Convey	45	7	45	7	0	0	0	0
19	FW	(Republic of Ireland) IRL	Kevin Doyle	51	19	41+4	18	0+3	1	2+1	0
21	GK	(Republic of Ireland) IRL	Graham Stack	8	0	1	0	4	0	3	0
23	DF	(England) ENG	Chris Makin	19	0	11+1	0	4	0	2+1	0
24	FW	(Republic of Ireland) IRL	Shane Long	15	4	1+10	3	4	1	0	0
26	DF	(England) ENG	Curtis Osano	1	0	0	0	0+1	0	0	0
31	FW	(England) ENG	Simon Cox	6	0	0+2	0	0+2	0	0+2	0
33	DF	(England) ENG	Scott Golbourne	1	0	0+1	0	0	0	0	0
Players who left Reading during the season:
18	DF	(England) ENG	Michael Dobson	1	0	0+1	0	0	0	0	0
29	FW	(Nigeria) NGR	Eric Obinna	8	0	0+6	0	0	0	2	0
30	MF	(France) FRA	Sekou Baradji	3	0	0+1	0	0	0	2	0

=== Goal scorers ===
Place	Position	Nation	Number	Name	Championship	FA Cup	League Cup	Total
1	FW	(England)	12	Dave Kitson	18	0	4	22
2	FW	(Republic of Ireland)	19	Kevin Doyle	18	1	0	19
3	FW	(England)	8	Leroy Lita	11	3	1	15
4	MF	(England)	4	Steve Sidwell	10	0	0	10
5	MF	(England)	15	James Harper	7	0	0	7
5	MF	(United States)	17	Bobby Convey	7	0	0	7
7	FW	(England)	7	Glen Little	5	0	0	5
8	DF	(Iceland)	6	Brynjar Gunnarsson	4	0	0	4
8				Own goal	4	0	0	4
8	FW	(Republic of Ireland)	24	Shane Long	3	1	0	4
11	DF	(Senegal)	5	Ibrahima Sonko	3	0	0	3
12	DF	(Iceland)	16	Ívar Ingimarsson	2	0	0	2
12	DF	(England)	3	Nicky Shorey	2	0	0	2
12	MF	(England)	10	Stephen Hunt	2	0	0	2
12	MF	(England)	11	John Oster	1	0	1	2
16	DF	(Scotland)	2	Graeme Murty	1	0	0	1
16	DF	(England)	14	John Halls	1	0	0	1
				TOTALS	99	6	6	111

=== Clean sheets ===
Place	Position	Nation	Number	Name	Championship	FA Cup	League Cup	Total
1	GK	(United States)	1	Marcus Hahnemann	22	0	1	23
2	GK	(Republic of Ireland)	21	Graham Stack	0	0	1	1
TOTALS					22	0	2	24
