= Shane Long =

Irish footballer (born 1987)

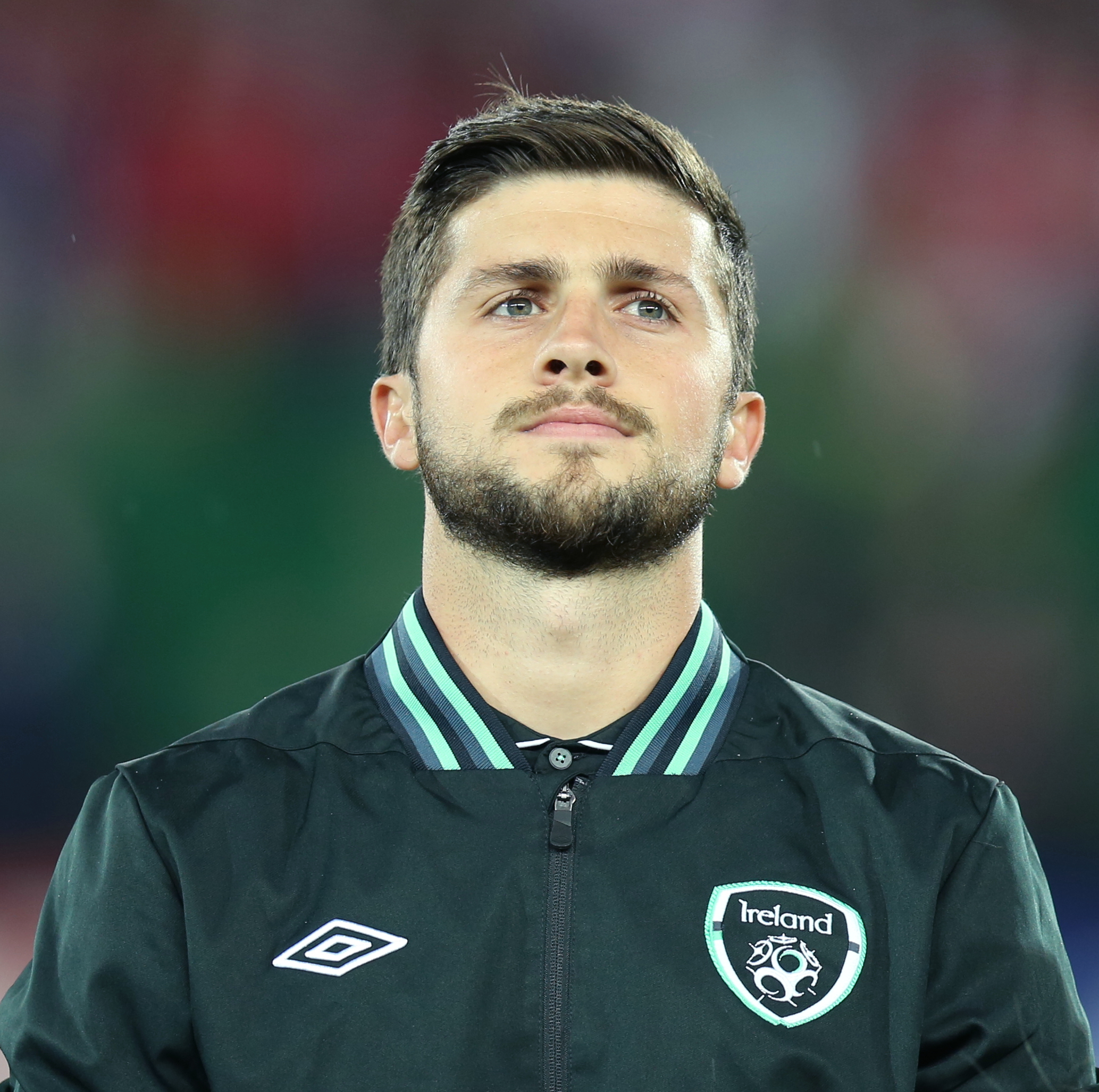
- Long with the Republic of Ireland in 2013

Personal information
- Full name: Shane Patrick Long
- Date of birth: 22 January 1987 (age 39)
- Place of birth: Gortnahoe, Ireland
- Height: 1.80 m (5 ft 11 in)
- Position: Forward

Youth career
- 1994–2002: Borris St. Kevins
- 2002–2004: St. Michael's
- 2004–2005: Cork City

Senior career*
Years	Team	Apps	(Gls)
2005	Cork City	1	(0)
2005–2011	Reading	174	(44)
2011–2014	West Bromwich Albion	81	(19)
2014	Hull City	15	(4)
2014–2022	Southampton	198	(28)
2021	→ Bournemouth (loan)	11	(2)
2022–2023	Reading	30	(1)
Total		512	(99)

International career
2005–2006	Republic of Ireland U19	8	(0)
2006	Republic of Ireland U21	1	(0)
2007–2021	Republic of Ireland	88	(17)
- * Club domestic league appearances and goals

Shane Patrick Long (born 22 January 1987) is an Irish former professional footballer who played as a striker.

Long began his football career at Cork City. He later moved to Reading where, among other achievements, he scored three goals in ten substitute appearances during his team's Championship-winning 2005–06 campaign, guided his team into the fourth round of the FA Cup by defeating Liverpool in a third round replay match in 2010, and later won a player of the season award. He signed for Premier League side West Bromwich Albion in 2011 for a fee of £6 million, and joined Hull City in January 2014, then Southampton in August 2014. On 23 April 2019, he scored the fastest goal in Premier League history. He had a loan spell with Bournemouth, and returned to Reading in July 2022 before retiring a year later.

Long made his senior debut for the Republic of Ireland in 2007, earning 88 international caps and scoring 17 goals over a 14-year career with the national team.

== Early life ==
Long was born in Gortnahoe, County Tipperary, Ireland. He was a talented hurler and appeared in two All-Ireland Minor Hurling Championship (under-18) semi-finals with Tipperary at Croke Park, and was regarded as a pacey and promising forward. Long was also playing Gaelic football at this time, and started his career in the game with Two-Mile Borris club St Kevin's FC in 1994, joining St. Michael's in Tipperary Town in 2002.

== Club career ==
=== Cork City ===
Long was discovered and brought to Cork City with a scholarship on 1 July 2004 by Pat Dolan. He was called to the first team squad for the 2005 season when manager Dolan was replaced by Damien Richardson, and the new manager awarded him his senior League of Ireland debut on 25 March 2005 as a substitute for Joe Gamble. His only other appearance was again as a substitute in the Setanta Sports Cup on 2 May. However, following Dolan's consultation with his brother, Reading coach Eamonn Dolan, Reading made bids for both Long and Kevin Doyle. Cork were forced to sell Doyle due to a contract clause, but the circumstances surrounding Long's transfer were not disclosed. Long signed as a Reading player on 7 June 2005.

=== Reading ===
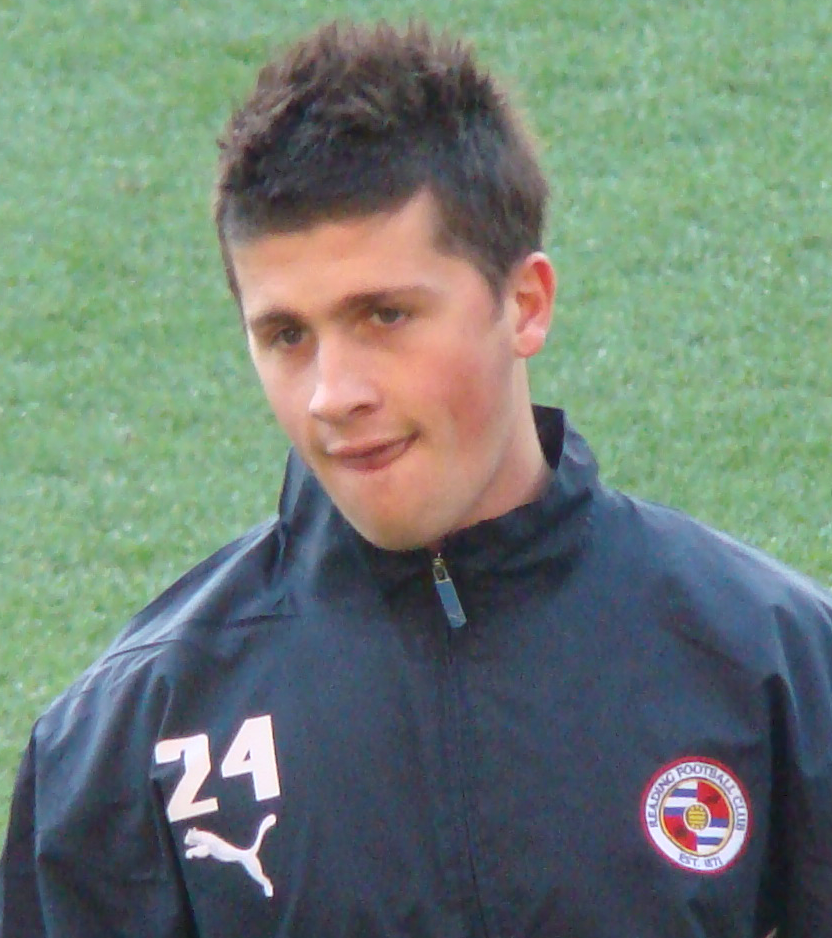
Long training for Reading in 2008

In Reading's Championship-winning 2005–06 campaign, Long scored three goals in ten substitute appearances, making his first league start on 17 April 2006 in the 3–1 home victory against Stoke City. For the first season, he was mostly second choice in the pecking order behind fellow Irishman Kevin Doyle, Dave Kitson and Leroy Lita. He started all of the games in Reading's FA Cup campaign and scored one goal.

On 4 July 2007, Long signed an improved four-year contract to keep him at Reading until the end of the 2010–11 season.

On 16 March 2008, in a 2–1 defeat at Anfield against Liverpool, Long was involved in an incident as to where he flung his shirt to the ground, citing frustration at his performance and frustration with the match official Andre Marriner, after being subbed by manager Steve Coppell. In the post-match interview, Steve Coppell made a stern point in that "it will not happen again". Long made a full apology on the official club website.

His 2008–09 season ended happily after scoring an equaliser in a 1–1 draw at Southampton, before ending the season with a brace in a 2–0 victory at Norwich City.

In the 2010 FA Cup third round replay match against Liverpool, Long was fouled by Yossi Benayoun to win a 93rd-minute penalty as Liverpool led 1–0 at Anfield to bring the match into extra time. Long then scored a glancing header in the 100th minute in front of the Anfield Kop from a cross supplied by Brynjar Gunnarsson, which sent Reading into the Fourth round of the FA Cup to play at home against Burnley.

On 29 January 2010, Long scored a crucial goal at home to strugglers Barnsley that gifted Reading all three points in a 1–0 win for the Royals. The following Saturday, his good run of form continued with an opening goal which contributed to a 2–1 win away to Doncaster Rovers at the Keepmoat Stadium. His goalscoring continued, as on 9 February 2010, he scored a brace in a 2–1 win at home to Plymouth Argyle, giving Reading their third consecutive league victory and Long's fourth goal in three games.

On 13 February 2010, however, in an FA Cup fifth round match at home to West Bromwich Albion, Long was sent off for a careless lunge at West Brom Ivorian defender Abdoulaye Méïté. It was his second-straight dismissible offence of the season, the first procured away to Derby County in a Championship match in November. On 7 March 2010, in Reading's FA Cup quarter-final against Aston Villa, Long scored a brace in the first half, which saw Reading leading 2–0 at half-time. However, a hat-trick from Norwegian striker John Carew and a strike from Ashley Young in the second-half saw Long's brace go to waste as Aston Villa booked themselves a place in the semi-finals. On 2 May 2010, Long played his 150th game for Reading in the 4–1 Championship win over Preston North End at the Madejski Stadium.

On 11 September 2010, Long won two penalties and converted the first in Reading's 3–0 win over Crystal Palace. On 4 November, Shane Long signed a one-year contract extension, valid until 2012. On 18 December, he scored twice against Derby, which led to the best goal-scoring form of his life. He followed up with a brace against Bristol City on Boxing Day. On 3 January 2011, Long scored another brace to give Reading the three points against Burnley in a 2–1 victory. On 8 January 2011, Long then hit the only goal in the FA Cup's third round encounter with West Brom. After an impressive season for Reading, Long won the Player of the Season award, beating Jimmy Kébé and Jem Karacan.

Long scored two goals for Reading on 17 May 2011 in a 3–0 away win against Cardiff City in the second leg of the Championship Play-off semi-finals; one goal came from the penalty spot and the other a lob after a blocked clearance from Cardiff goalkeeper Stephen Bywater. Long received the Man of the Match award for his efforts. He finished the season with 28 goals in 58 matches for club and country, the best season in his career to date. After the play-off final defeat against Swansea City, Reading chairman John Madejski declared Long to be world-class: "What is the value I would place on him? £20m."

=== West Bromwich Albion ===
On 9 August 2011, Long signed for Premier League side West Bromwich Albion on a three-year deal, with a further year's option. Although the fee was undisclosed, it is believed to be £4.5 million, with add-ons that could eventually rise to £6.5 million, which would be a record fee for West Bromwich, surpassing the £4.7 million paid for Spanish international midfielder Borja Valero from Mallorca in 2008. On 12 August, Long was handed the number 9 shirt, and two days later made his debut in the league opener against Manchester United at The Hawthorns. He marked his debut by scoring an equalising goal that went past Manchester United goalkeeper David de Gea, albeit in a losing effort, 2–1. Long scored again in the fourth minute of his second match, against Chelsea on 20 August 2011, in what proved to be yet another 2–1 defeat. Long scored his third goal in the fifth minute against Sunderland on 1 October, his seventh game of the season. The match ended 2–2 with James Morrison also scoring on the fourth minute.

On 16 October 2011, Long was named man of the match in the Black Country derby against Wolverhampton Wanderers, despite not scoring. The match ended 2–0 for West Brom, with Chris Brunt scoring in the eighth minute and Peter Odemwingie scoring in the 76th minute. Long suffered a chipped bone in his knee after a match against Aston Villa after a robust challenge by Alan Hutton, ruling him out for approximately six weeks. On 19 November, weeks before he was predicted injury-free, he played 90 minutes against Bolton Wanderers, a game which Albion won 2–1, with Long scoring what proved to be the winner with a header against a much more physical opponent in David Wheater. On 3 December, Long scored a goal off a deflected shot in the last minutes of a match against Queens Park Rangers earning Albion a draw by leveling the game at 1–1. Long once again found the net on 25 March against Newcastle United, with a consolation goal in a 1–3 defeat. On the final day of the season, he scored in a 2–3 defeat against Arsenal to finish his debut season for West Brom with eight Premier League goals.

In the 2012–13 season, he started off the season very brightly after winning two penalties against Liverpool. Although he missed the first penalty, he won the second, which Peter Odemwingie converted. He continued his good form with Premier League goals against Everton, Aston Villa, Manchester City, Chelsea and Sunderland, as well as a brace against Yeovil Town in the second round of the Football League Cup, to put him on seven goals for the season by the end of November. He finished the season with 11 goals in all competitions, supplemented with two goals for Republic of Ireland.

On the final day of the summer transfer window for the 2013–14 season, a move to Hull City valued at £5 million fell through at the last moment, after West Brom manager Steve Clarke pulled out from the transfer. Clarke stated that Long was needed, as he did not have enough attacking options, despite signing Stéphane Sessègnon and Victor Anichebe just minutes earlier both for £6 million fees from Sunderland and Everton respectively. After limited starts at the beginning of the season, Long started and scored his first of the season against Chelsea away at Stamford Bridge. The game finished 2–2. Long continued his good run of form against Aston Villa with two superb goals in the first 11 minutes, later being named Man of the Match.

=== Hull City ===
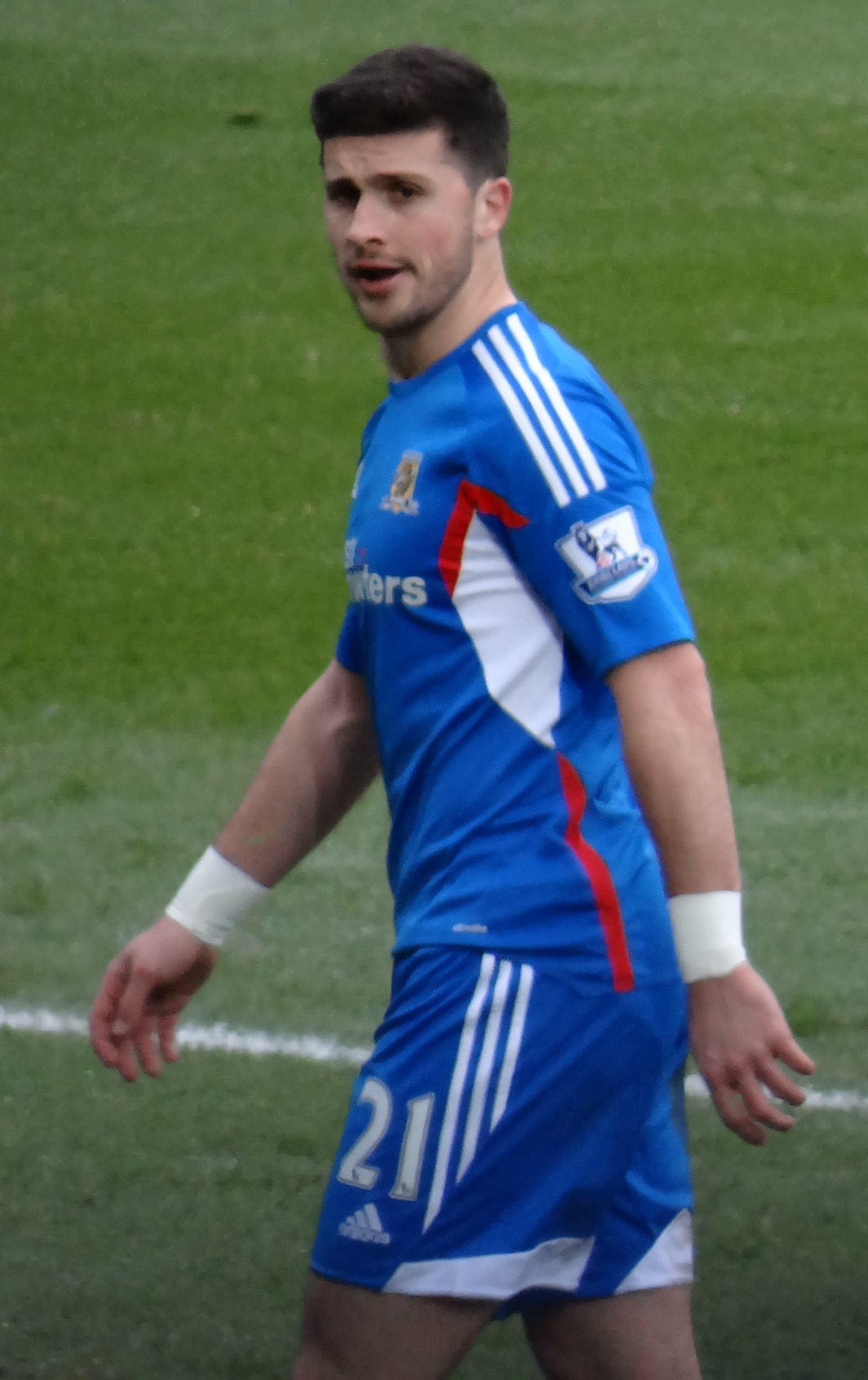
Long playing for Hull City in February 2014

On 17 January 2014, Long signed for Hull City for an undisclosed fee on a three-and-a-half-year deal. Long made his debut on 28 January 2014 away at Crystal Palace in a 1–0 defeat. In his next match, at home to Tottenham Hotspur on 1 February 2014, Long opened the scoring in a 1–1 draw. On 22 March 2014, he played in his first match against previous club West Brom at the KC Stadium. Despite a warm reception before the game from the travelling West Brom fans, he won a penalty for Hull after 30 minutes, which has been interpreted as a dive by the West Brom supporters. From then, West Brom fans booed his every touch, and he scored his third Hull goal before half time, cementing a 2–0 win for Hull. Long missed out on Hull's historic run to the FA Cup Final as he was cup-tied, having played in West Brom's third-round tie against Crystal Palace.

=== Southampton ===
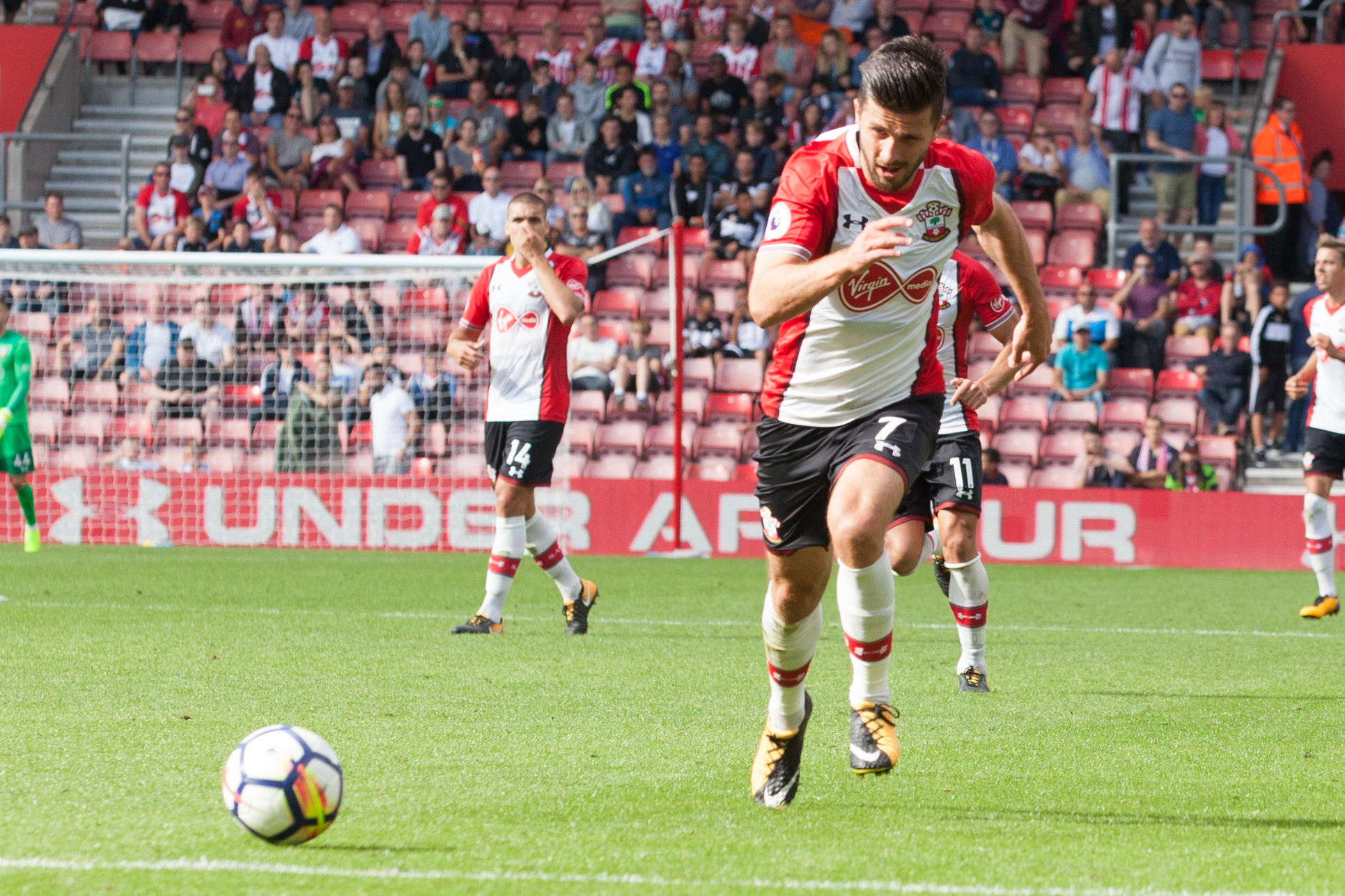
Long playing for Southampton in 2017

Long played in both legs of Hull's Europa League qualifying tie against AS Trencín before the start of the 2014–15 Premier League season. They were his last official matches for Hull, as on 14 August 2014, Long signed a four-year contract with Southampton for an undisclosed fee, believed to be in the region of £12 million.

Three days later, he made his first appearance for the club, replacing fellow debutant Dušan Tadić for the final 16 minutes of a 2–1 defeat at Liverpool in Southampton's opening game of the league season. He almost scored a late equaliser when he nodded a header just wide of the post. Long scored his first Southampton goal against Stoke City in the League Cup on 29 October, putting his team 2–0 up in a 3–2 victory.

He scored his first league goals for the club with a brace in a 2–0 win over Leicester City, having come on as a substitute for Sadio Mané with 22 minutes remaining.

On 16 May 2015, Long assisted teammate Sadio Mané twice inside three minutes as the latter scored the fastest ever hat-trick in Premier League history during the first half of a 6–1 demolition of Aston Villa. Later on in the first half, Long himself scored twice to give the Saints a 5–0 lead five minutes from half-time. The second of these efforts was a 35-yard lob which was named as Southampton's Goal of the Season.

In his first appearance the following season, Long scored Southampton's final goal in a 3–0 victory over Dutch opponents Vitesse Arnhem at St Mary's Stadium in the first leg of the Europa League third qualifying round. He scored his first Premier League goal of the season on the opening weekend, coming off the bench against Newcastle to head the score level, bringing the game to 2–2. On 26 December 2015, Long scored two goals against Arsenal in a game that ended 4–0 to Southampton. He scored his 100th career goal in English football in the 4–2 home win over Manchester City on 1 May 2016.

On 21 July 2016, Long signed a new contract with Southampton, extending his stay with the club until 2020. He ended a barren run of 23 games without a goal for Southampton on 31 December 2016, when he headed in against West Bromwich Albion at St. Mary's to give the home side a 1–0 lead. The match finished 2–1 to the visitors.

On 5 April 2019, he became only the fourth Irish player to score 50 Premier League goals, after Robbie Keane, Niall Quinn and Damien Duff when he scored in a 3–1 defeat to Liverpool.

On 23 April 2019, Long scored the fastest goal in Premier League history against Watford, clocking in at 7.69 seconds after kick off. The record was previously held by Ledley King when he scored after 10 seconds for Tottenham Hotspur against Bradford City in December 2000.

On 4 June 2020, it was announced that Long had signed a two-year contract extension with Southampton, which would extend his stay at the club until the 2021–22 season.

On 1 July 2022, Long's contract expired and Southampton announced that he would be leaving the club.

==== Bournemouth (loan) ====
On 2 February 2021, Long joined Championship club Bournemouth on loan for the remainder of the 2020–21 season. Five days later, he made his debut for the Cherries, being included in the starting lineup for a 3–2 home league win over Birmingham City. He scored his first goal for Bournemouth in a 2–1 defeat at Queens Park Rangers on 20 February 2021.

=== Return to Reading ===
On 13 July 2022, Long returned to Reading, signing a one-year contract. He retired from playing at the end of the season.

== International career ==
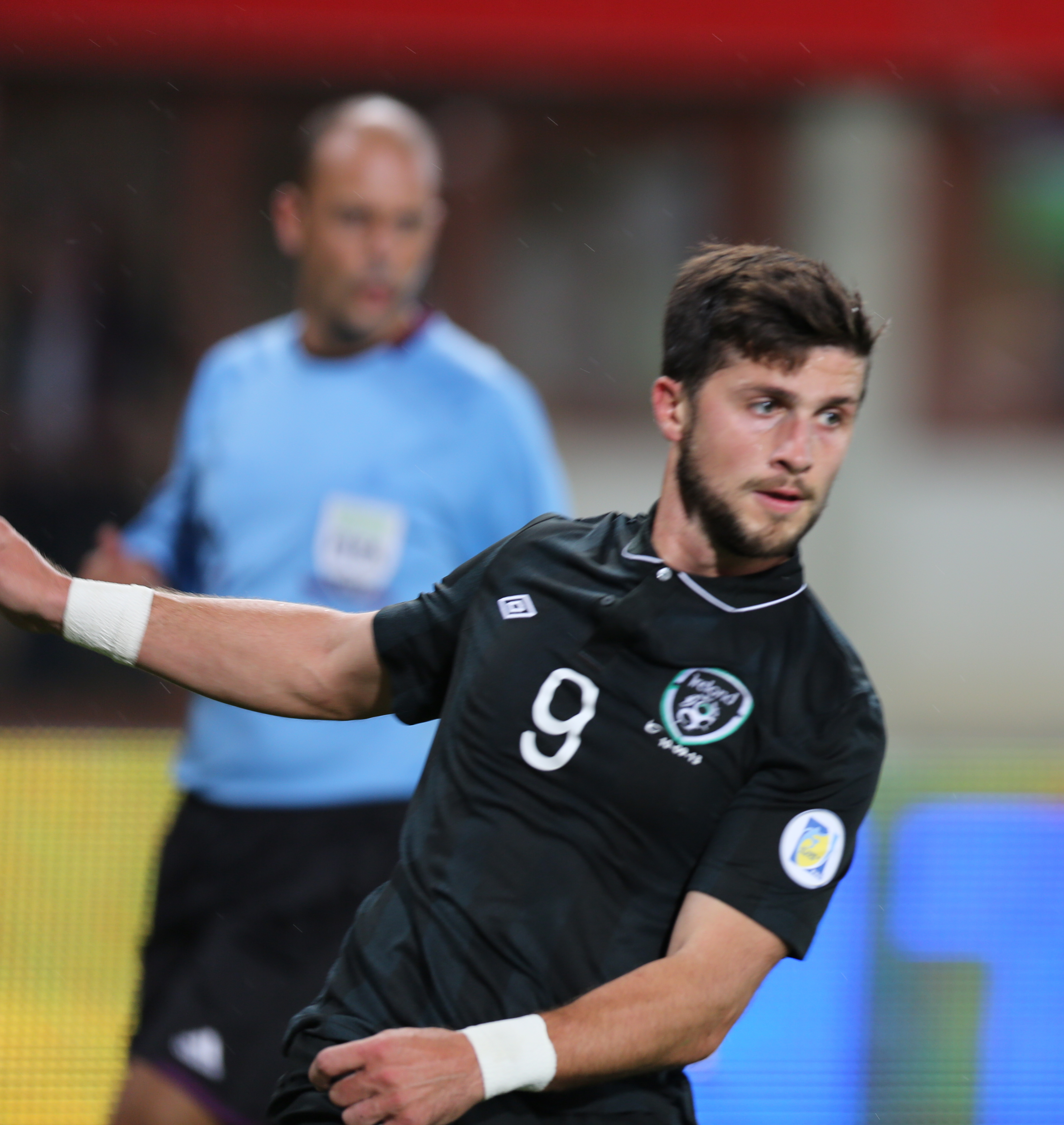
Long in action for the Republic of Ireland against Austria, September 2013

Long's form for Reading in the 2005–06 season earned him four Republic of Ireland U19 caps. Due to injuries to his Reading teammate Kevin Doyle and Sunderland's Stephen Elliott, he earned his first senior cap for the Republic of Ireland in their 2–1 win away to San Marino on 7 February 2007.

When Long earned his second cap as a substitute against Slovakia on 28 March 2007 he became the first person to play both hurling and international football at Croke Park, having been part of the Tipperary team for the All-Ireland Minor semi-finals in 2003 and 2004. Long scored his first international goal in a friendly 1–1 draw against Bolivia on 26 May 2007, and followed this with a brace in Ireland's 4–0 win over Denmark on 22 August 2007. He was nominated as the Football Association of Ireland Young Player of the Year for 2007.

In March 2011, Long was brought on early to replace the injured Kevin Doyle in a UEFA Euro 2012 qualifier against Macedonia in Dublin. His performance was rewarded with a start in Ireland's next game against Uruguay in which Long scored the first of Ireland's goals with a header in a 2–3 loss. On 26 May 2012, Long scored when he headed the winner in a 1–0 win over Bosnia and Herzegovina. He played in UEFA Euro 2012, coming off the bench against Croatia and Italy.

On 29 May 2013, Long scored his ninth goal for Ireland, a header against England at Wembley Stadium, a match which finished 1–1. He then captained Ireland for the first time on 2 June 2013 against Georgia, a match which Ireland won 4–0. On 5 March 2014, Long scored his 11th goal for his country in a 2–1 loss to Serbia. On 29 March 2015, Long came off the bench to score a last-minute equaliser against Poland in 2016 Euro qualifier. On 8 October 2015, Long again came off the bench to score the winning goal against reigning world champions Germany in another 2016 Euro qualifier in the Aviva Stadium.

== Personal life ==
Long Played Minor hurling for Tipperary and made in the back to back All Ireland Semi-Finals in 2002 and 2003. He played club hurling for Gortnahoe in his youth and in 2024 returned to play junior hurling with them.

In June 2013, Long married his partner Kayleah Adams in Enniskerry in County Wicklow. They have three children.

== Career statistics ==
=== Club ===
Appearances and goals by club, season and competition
Club	Season	League			FA Cup		League Cup		Other		Total	
Club	Season	Division	Apps	Goals	Apps	Goals	Apps	Goals	Apps	Goals	Apps	Goals
Cork City	2005	League of Ireland Premier Division	1	0	0	0	—		1 (Note: Appearance in Setanta Cup)	0	2	0
Reading	2005–06	Championship	11	3	4	1	0	0	—		15	4
Reading	2006–07	Premier League	21	2	1	1	2	1	—		24	4
Reading	2007–08	Premier League	29	3	2	0	1	0	—		32	3
Reading	2008–09	Championship	37	9	1	0	3	0	2 (Note: Appearance(s) in Championship play-offs)	0	43	9
Reading	2009–10	Championship	31	6	5	3	0	0	—		36	9
Reading	2010–11	Championship	44	21	4	2	1	0	3	2	52	25
Reading	2011–12	Championship	1	0	0	0	0	0	—		1	0
Reading	Total		174	44	17	7	7	1	5	2	203	54
West Bromwich Albion	2011–12	Premier League	32	8	1	0	0	0	—		33	8
West Bromwich Albion	2012–13	Premier League	34	8	1	1	2	2	—		37	11
West Bromwich Albion	2013–14	Premier League	15	3	1	0	1	0	—		17	3
West Bromwich Albion	Total		81	19	3	1	3	2	—		87	22
Hull City	2013–14	Premier League	15	4	0	0	0	0	—		15	4
Hull City	2014–15	Premier League	0	0	0	0	0	0	2 (Note: Appearances in UEFA Europa League)	0	2	0
Hull City	Total		15	4	0	0	0	0	2	0	17	4
Southampton	2014–15	Premier League	32	5	3	1	4	1	—		39	7
Southampton	2015–16	Premier League	28	10	1	0	2	2	3	1	34	13
Southampton	2016–17	Premier League	32	3	3	1	5	1	5	0	45	5
Southampton	2017–18	Premier League	30	2	4	0	1	0	—		35	2
Southampton	2018–19	Premier League	26	5	2	0	0	0	—		28	5
Southampton	2019–20	Premier League	26	2	2	1	3	0	—		31	3
Southampton	2020–21	Premier League	11	0	2	0	1	0	—		14	0
Southampton	2021–22	Premier League	13	1	4	1	2	0	—		19	2
Southampton	Total		198	28	21	4	20	4	8	1	245	37
Bournemouth (loan)	2020–21	Championship	11	2	0	0	0	0	1	0	12	2
Reading	2022–23	Championship	30	1	2	1	0	0	—		32	2
Career total			510	98	43	13	28	7	17	3	598	121

=== International ===
Appearances and goals by national team and year
National team	Year	Apps	Goals
Republic of Ireland	2007	7	3
Republic of Ireland	2008	2	0
Republic of Ireland	2009	2	0
Republic of Ireland	2010	5	2
Republic of Ireland	2011	7	1
Republic of Ireland	2012	9	2
Republic of Ireland	2013	10	2
Republic of Ireland	2014	9	1
Republic of Ireland	2015	8	3
Republic of Ireland	2016	12	3
Republic of Ireland	2017	8	0
Republic of Ireland	2018	3	0
Republic of Ireland	2020	3	0
Republic of Ireland	2021	3	0
Total		88	17

Scores and results list Republic of Ireland's goal tally first, score column indicates score after each Long goal.

List of international goals scored by Shane Long
No.	Date	Venue	Opponent	Score	Result	Competition
1	26 May 2007	Gillette Stadium, Foxborough, United States	Bolivia	1–1	1–1	Friendly
2	22 August 2007	NRGi Park, Aarhus, Denmark	Denmark	3–0	4–0	Friendly
3	22 August 2007	NRGi Park, Aarhus, Denmark	Denmark	4–0	4–0	Friendly
4	8 October 2010	Aviva Stadium, Dublin, Ireland	Russia	2–3	2–3	UEFA Euro 2012 qualification
5	17 November 2010	Aviva Stadium, Dublin, Ireland	Norway	1–0	1–2	Friendly
6	29 March 2011	Aviva Stadium, Dublin, Ireland	Uruguay	1–1	2–3	Friendly
7	26 May 2012	Aviva Stadium, Dublin, Ireland	Bosnia and Herzegovina	1–0	1–0	Friendly
8	11 September 2012	Craven Cottage, London, England	Oman	3–0	4–1	Friendly
9	29 May 2013	Wembley Stadium, London, England	England	1–0	1–1	Friendly
10	15 November 2013	Aviva Stadium, Dublin, Ireland	Latvia	3–0	3–0	Friendly
11	5 March 2014	Aviva Stadium, Dublin, Ireland	Serbia	1–0	1–2	Friendly
12	29 March 2015	Aviva Stadium, Dublin, Ireland	Poland	1–1	1–1	UEFA Euro 2016 qualification
13	4 September 2015	Estádio Algarve, Faro, Portugal	Gibraltar	4–0	4–0	UEFA Euro 2016 qualification
14	8 October 2015	Aviva Stadium, Dublin, Ireland	Germany	1–0	1–0	UEFA Euro 2016 qualification
15	29 March 2016	Aviva Stadium, Dublin, Ireland	Slovakia	1–1	2–2	Friendly
16	27 May 2016	Aviva Stadium, Dublin, Ireland	Netherlands	1–0	1–1	Friendly
17	9 October 2016	Zimbru Stadium, Chișinău, Moldova	Moldova	1–0	3–1	2018 FIFA World Cup qualification

== Honours ==
Reading

- Football League Championship: 2005–06

Southampton

- EFL Cup runner-up: 2016–17

Republic of Ireland

- Nations Cup: 2011

Individual

- Reading Player of the Season: 2010–11
- FAI Young International Player of the Year: 2010
- FAI International Goal of the Year: 2013 vs. England
- Southampton Goal of the Season: 2014–15

Tipperary GAA

- Munster Minor Hurling Championship: 2003
