= Sekou =

Sekou, also spelled Sékou or Seku, is a given name from the Fula language. It is equivalent to the Arabic Sheikh. People with this name include:

== People ==
- Sekou (singer), British singer

=== Given name ===
- Seku Amadu (1776–1845), also known as Sékou Amadou or Sheikh Amadu, founder of the Massina Empire in Mali
- Ahmed Sékou Touré (1922–1984), first president of Guinea (1958–1984)
- Sekou Sundiata (1948–2007), African-American poet and performer at The New School in New York City
- Sekou Conneh (born 1960), Liberian politician and former rebel leader
- Sékou Dramé (born 1973), Guinean football player
- Sékou Berthé (born 1977), Malian football defender who last played for Persepolis in Iran Pro League
- Sékou Fofana (born 1980), Malian football defender who plays for FC Banants in Armenian Premier League
- Sékou Tidiane Souaré (born 1983), Ivorian football player, who currently plays for B36 Tórshavn
- Sekou Baradji (born 1984), French football midfielder
- Sékou Camara (footballer, born 1985) (1985–2013), Malian footballer
- Sekou Cissé (born 1985), Côte d'Ivoire football striker
- Sekou Bagayoko (born 1987), Malian professional football player who plays for Jeunesse Sportive de la Saoura
- Sekou Jabateh Oliseh (born 1990), Liberian international footballer who plays professionally for Russian side Kuban Krasnodar
- Sékou Koné (born 2006), Malian footballer
- Sékou Mara (born 2002), French footballer who plays as a striker for RC Strasbourg and formerly for Southampton
- Sekou Bangoura (born 1991), American tennis player
- Sékou Baradji (born 1995), French football forward
- Sekou Lumumba, Canadian rock musician
- Sekou Odinga, born Nathanial Burns, American activist who was imprisoned for actions with the Black Liberation Army
- Sekou Tidiany Bangoura (born 2002), Guinean footballer
- Sékou Traoré, filmmaker from Burkina Faso
- Sekou Kone, Malian footballer who plays as a defensive midfielder for Man United
- Sekou Smith (1972-2021), American sportswriter
- Hakeem Sekou Jeffries, American politician, Representative for New York's 8th congressional district

=== Surname ===
- Lasana M. Sekou (born 1959), writer from Saint Martin
- Malik Sekou (born 1964), academic from the United States Virgin Islands

== See also ==
- Sékou, Benin, a town and arrondissement in the Atlantique Department of southern Benin
