= Seku =

Seku may refer to:

- Seku (given name), a masculine given name
- Seku (surname), a Malian surname
