= Kevin Doyle (footballer) =

Irish footballer (born 1983)

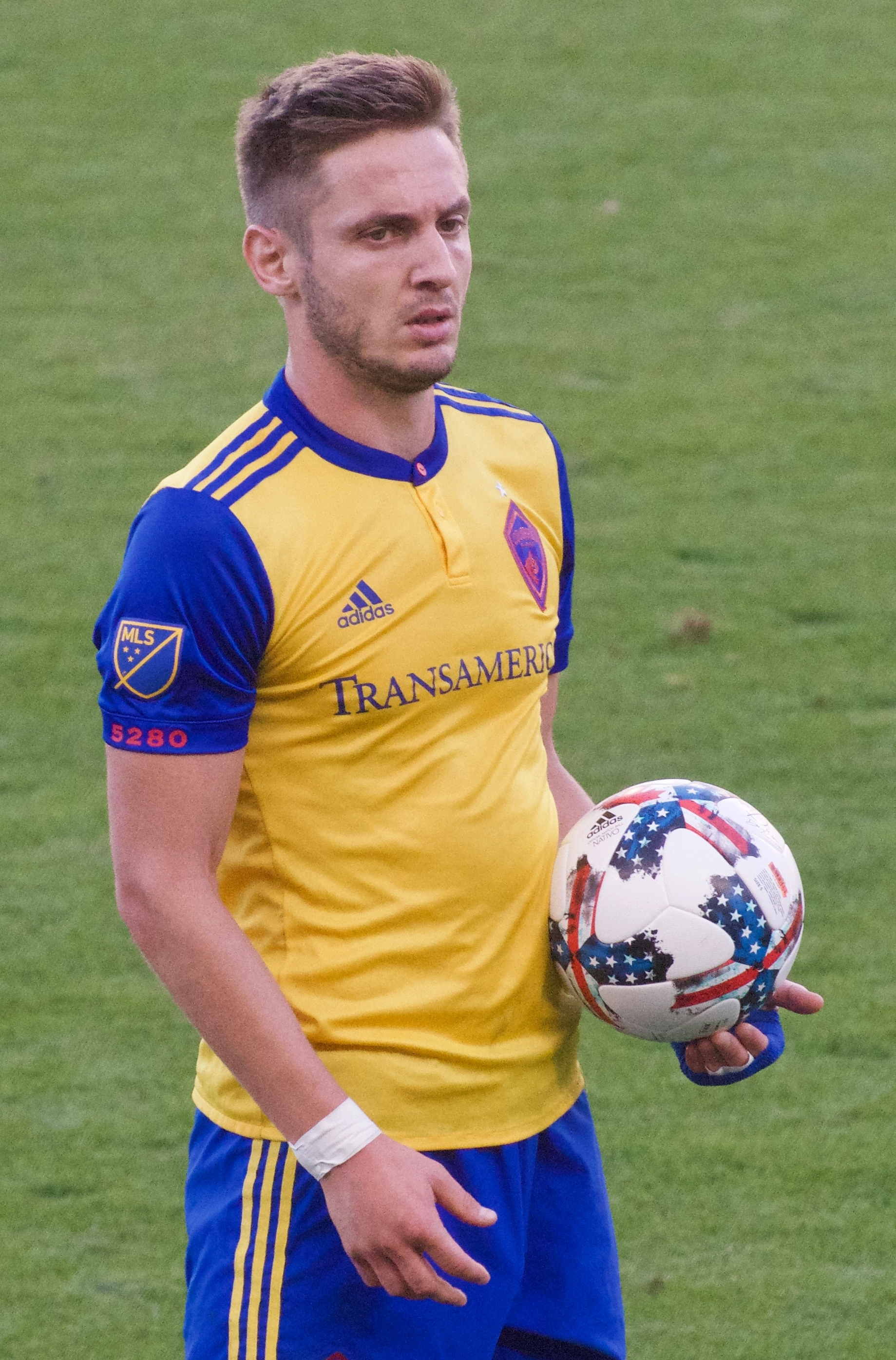
- Doyle playing for the Colorado Rapids in 2017

Personal information
- Full name: Kevin Edward Doyle
- Date of birth: 18 September 1983 (age 43)
- Place of birth: Adamstown, County Wexford, Ireland
- Height: 1.81 m (5 ft 11 in)
- Position: Forward

Youth career
- Wexford
- 2002: St Patrick's Athletic

Senior career*
Years	Team	Apps	(Gls)
2002–2003	St Patrick's Athletic	13	(0)
2003–2005	Cork City	76	(25)
2005–2009	Reading	157	(55)
2009–2015	Wolverhampton Wanderers	164	(30)
2014	→ Queens Park Rangers (loan)	9	(2)
2014–2015	→ Crystal Palace (loan)	3	(0)
2015–2017	Colorado Rapids	75	(17)
Total		490	(128)

International career
2003	Republic of Ireland U20	5	(1)
2002–2005	Republic of Ireland U21	11	(7)
2006–2017	Republic of Ireland	62	(14)
- * Club domestic league appearances and goals

Kevin Edward Doyle (born 18 September 1983) is an Irish former professional footballer who played as a forward.

He played for Wexford F.C. (formerly Wexford Youths), St Patrick's Athletic, and Cork City in his homeland before he moved to English side Reading. He was part of Reading's record-breaking promotion to the Premier League in 2006. In June 2009, he moved to Wolverhampton Wanderers for a then-club record £6.5 million and finished his career in the United States with the Colorado Rapids.

Doyle made his debut for the Republic of Ireland national team in 2006. He scored fourteen goals in 62 appearances for Ireland and represented the country at UEFA Euro 2012.

In February 2018, Doyle took a job with the Wexford GAA Under-20s football team as an advisor to the team.

== Club career ==
=== St Patrick's Athletic ===
Doyle signed for his first professional club St Patrick's Athletic in September 2001 as a free agent. Doyle initially played for the club's under 18 side but within weeks had made his League of Ireland Premier Division debut on 25 November 2001 in a 1–1 draw with Monaghan United at Richmond Park. He made 13 appearances in all competitions for the club.

=== Cork City ===
He then had a successful spell with Cork City, who he joined in March 2003 on a two-year deal, linking up with his former St. Patrick's Athletic manager Pat Dolan, who had recently taken over at Turners Cross. Doyle scored 25 goals for Cork City where he began playing on the right-wing but soon reverted to his natural position of striker. He also scored two goals from six appearances in the 2004 UEFA Intertoto Cup, including the winner against Dutch side NEC Nijmegen.

For his form he was awarded the eircom/Soccer Writers' Association of Ireland Player of the Month for November 2004

Thousands of fans gave him a standing ovation in his final game for Cork City, against Finn Harps, before his transfer to Reading.

=== Reading ===
On 7 June 2005, Doyle signed for Reading on a two-year deal from Cork City, Ireland for €117,000 (about £78,000). Despite having left Cork City, Doyle received a championship medal when they won the League of Ireland Premier Division in November 2005. Originally, he was signed as a back-up, but injuries to Dave Kitson and then Leroy Lita gave him an opportunity in the first team which he retained thanks to a number of important goals along the way. He scored 19 in total including the equalising goal at Leicester City on the day the Royals were promoted to the Premier League for the first time in their history, 25 March 2006. He became an intrinsic part of Reading's Championship-winning 2005–06 squad, and according to the Actim Index was the top player in the Championship. He was named the official Reading F.C. player of the season for 2005–06. In April 2006, he was also named as Championship Fans' Player of the Year and one of the Championship Team of the Year by the Professional Footballers' Association (PFA).

Doyle played an important role for Reading in the 2006–07 Premier League season. His first Premiership goal came in the Royals 2–1 defeat at Aston Villa, when he headed Reading into a third-minute lead. Doyle began to show a great threat in the air, during the year 2007 he scored more headers than any other player in England's leagues. He was nominated for the PFA Young Player of the Year but lost out to Cesc Fàbregas. He finished the season with 13 Premier League goals after being curtailed with a torn hamstring for two months. Reading were relegated in the 2007–08 season, but they decided to hold onto Doyle and many of their top players.

On 1 September 2008, he was linked with a move to Aston Villa but in the end the striker remained at Reading.

Doyle remained at Reading to try to help them return to the top flight in the 2008–09 season. He scored 18 league goals but the club failed to achieve promotion after finishing fourth and losing in the play-offs to Burnley.

=== Wolverhampton Wanderers ===
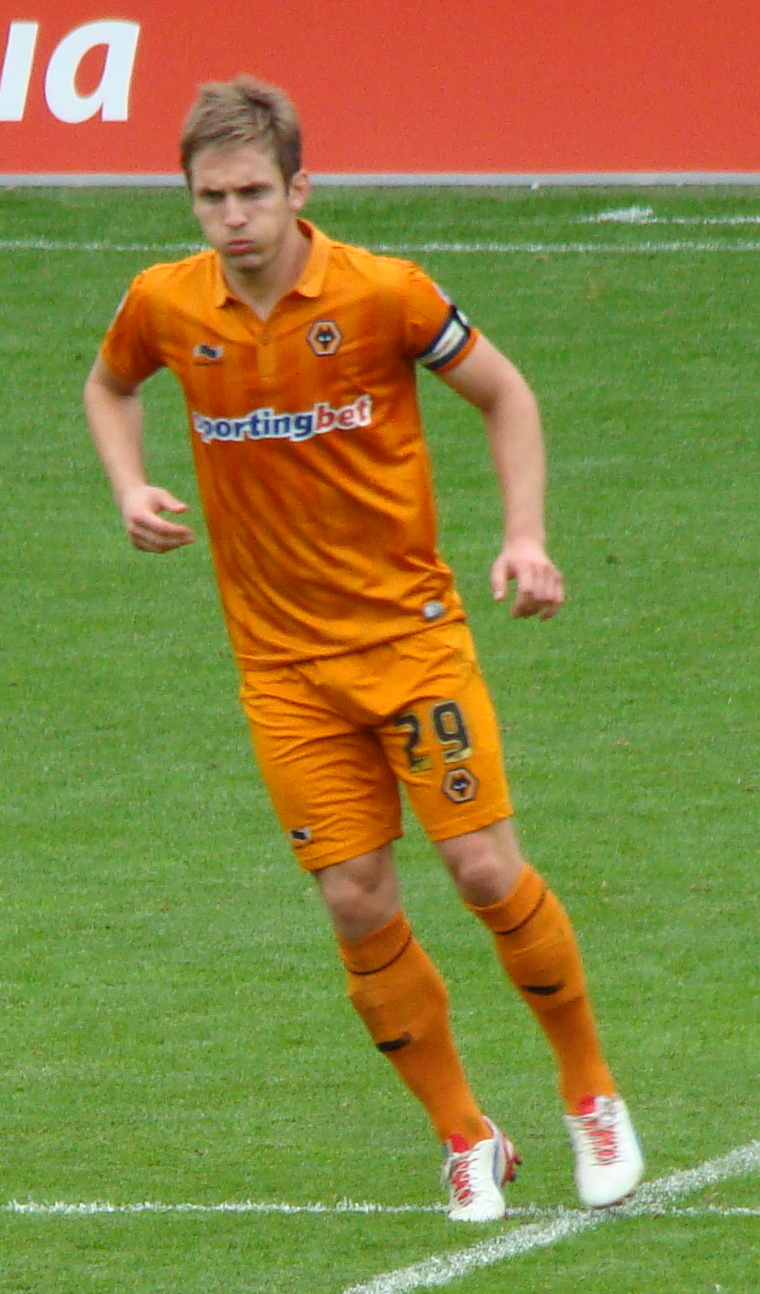
Doyle playing for Wolves in 2012

Doyle joined newly promoted Premier League side Wolverhampton Wanderers on 30 June 2009 when he signed a four-year contract for a club record fee, reportedly £6.5 million. However, he immediately had to undergo an operation to remove a hernia, which hindered his first pre-season at his new club. He picked up another minor injury while on international duty with Ireland that caused him to miss the start of the league season. He finally made his debut for Wolves on 22 August 2009, as a half time substitute at Manchester City.

He scored his first Wolves goal on 20 September 2009 to earn a 2–1 win over Fulham. Throughout much of the season he operated as a lone striker in a 4–5–1 formation. His contribution helped the club finish 15th in their first season in the Premier League. He also won the club's Player's Player of the Season Award and their Top Goalscorer Award after reaching nine goals.

Doyle continued to play the lone striker role throughout most of the 2010–11 season, despite the arrival of Steven Fletcher who equalled Doyle's club record fee. After Mick McCarthy rotated systems using various strikers, he eventually reverted to his previously successful 4–5–1 formation, with Doyle playing the lone front man role. He went on to score five goals for Wolves in the second half of the season – including the winner against Manchester United that halted their 29 match unbeaten run. On 26 March 2011, Doyle tore a knee ligament while on international duty with Ireland, which kept him out of action for up to 6 weeks. He returned to action on 14 May against Sunderland, coming on as a substitute, but played no part in their final game in which they narrowly escaped relegation.

Doyle was part of the Wolves squad who suffered successive relegations in consecutive seasons, to drop from the Premier League to League One during the 2011–12 and 2012–13 seasons. New Wolves manager Kenny Jackett stated that Doyle's wages were "too high for where we are" and that he expected him to leave. No bids materialised for the striker though during the Summer 2013 transfer window and he featured instead for Wolves' first team during the first part of the season as one of the few remaining players from their time in the Premier League.

On 31 January 2014 Doyle was loaned to Championship side Queens Park Rangers in a deal due to run until the end of the season. He scored on his debut against Burnley on 1 February 2014, and netted a second goal for the club against Reading, as the team chased an immediate return to the Premier League. However, a knee injury sustained against Birmingham City saw him spend a period back at Wolves during March and April as he underwent treatment. After returning to Loftus Road, Doyle featured in all three games of QPR's successful play-off campaign as they won promotion back to the Premier League.

On 1 September 2014, Doyle was loaned to Premier League side Crystal Palace until January 2015. He made only three substitute appearances for the Eagles in the Premier League, failing to score in any of these appearances. His final appearance during his loan spell saw him score his only goal for the club when he netted in an FA Cup tie against non-league Dover Athletic. At the end of his loan, he returned to Wolves, making a handful of appearances as substitute before his contract expired at the conclusion of the season. In total he scored 33 times for Wolves during 179 appearances, spread across playing from the Premier League to League One level.

=== Colorado Rapids ===
On 20 March 2015 it was announced that Doyle had signed a pre-contract agreement with the MLS club Colorado Rapids. The two-and-a-half-year deal was originally due to take effect from 1 July 2015 upon the expiry of his contract with Wolves, but the club reached a settlement on 6 May 2015, following the conclusion of Wolves' season, to allow Doyle to join Colorado earlier than planned. He made his MLS debut on 23 May 2015 as a substitute in a 1–0 win over the Vancouver Whitecaps.

On 28 September 2017, Doyle announced his immediate retirement from the game due to ongoing effects of concussion.

== International career ==
Doyle was first selected for his national team that won the Under-20 UAE invitational tournament in January 2003 He was then part of the squad at the 2003 FIFA World Youth Championship and scored against Colombia Doyle played for the Republic of Ireland U21 team, making his debut on 2 February 2004 against Portugal. With 11 caps, and scoring seven goals making him joint top scorer at that grade.

He was called up to the senior Republic of Ireland squad in October 2005, making his full international debut against Sweden at Lansdowne Road on 1 March 2006. His first start in a competitive international was against Germany on 2 September 2006 in a Euro 2008 qualifier. With this appearance, his family also won a €100 bet at 100/1 they had placed two years earlier on Doyle playing competitively for Ireland.

Doyle scored his first goal for Ireland against San Marino in November 2006. He was then named the official Football Association of Ireland Young Player of 2006 on 4 February 2007, also receiving a nomination for the senior award.

His second goal came in a 1–0 victory over Slovakia at Croke Park in March 2007. He also scored against Ecuador on 23 May 2007 securing a valiant 1–1 draw against the South Americans, and he scored his best goal for Ireland, with a long-range left-foot shot into the top corner to the keeper's right, in a 2–2 draw against Slovakia on 9 September 2007 in the Euro 2008 qualifying game in Bratislava. His fifth international goal and fourth in the Euro 2008 qualifiers came away to Wales as Ireland drew 2–2.

During 2010 World Cup qualifying, Doyle established himself as Robbie Keane's ideal strike partner in the national team's attacking quartet that included Damien Duff and Aiden McGeady. He played in 8 of the 10 games, scoring two goals, including the first in a 2–1 win in the opening game against Georgia. He also scored against Cyprus, his seventh international goal, in a 2–1 win in Nicosia. In the absence of Robbie Keane, Shay Given and other players who had been allowed to return to their clubs, Doyle captained Ireland for the first time in a friendly against South Africa on 8 September 2009.

Doyle was nominated as the Football Association of Ireland Player of the Year for 2007 and won the award in 2009, as well as for Goal of the Year for his goal against Slovakia in September 2007. Doyle scored his ninth international goal, and first in 2012 European Championships qualification, against Andorra at the Aviva Stadium on 7 September 2010. On 6 February 2011, Doyle was named Republic of Ireland Player of the Year for 2010, while he also earned the Goal of the Year award for Ireland, for his superb strike in last September's Euro 2012 qualifier against Andorra.

Doyle was sent off against Armenia on 11 October 2011. He reached 50 international caps against Italy at UEFA Euro 2012.

In the first game of 2014 FIFA World Cup qualification – UEFA Group C, Ireland were in a bad way against Kazakhstan, the team ranked 142nd in the world. Ireland were 1–0 down with 89 minutes gone. Doyle came off the bench to assist with the equalising goal (a Robbie Keane penalty) and then scored the winner. His reward was being named captain in an international friendly against Oman four days later, the second time he would captain his country. He scored again in that game.

Towards the end of the Trapattoni era, Doyle fell out of favour and was dropped from the squads but he was recalled by Interim manager Noel King for the qualifiers against Germany and Kazakhstan. Doyle played the full 90 minutes in both qualifiers against Germany and Kazakhstan in an unfamiliar role playing out on the wings.

In his 62nd match for the Republic, at home against Switzerland, he suffered a serious leg injury. After finding out that there were no broken bones, Doyle tweeted a picture of the injury. O'Neill was quoted as saying Doyle would still be in the running for the upcoming Euros.

== Other Interests ==
=== Media career ===
Doyle was part of RTÉ Sport's punditry team for the UEFA Euro 2020, alongside Damien Duff, Liam Brady and Richie Sadlier. He continued this role for the 2026 FIFA World Cup.

=== Horse racing ===
Since 2016 Doyle has been breeding horses at Slaney River Stud. In November 2018 he became a part owner of Augusta Kate. His father Paddy Doyle bred Cheltenham Festival winner Holywell.

== Career statistics ==
=== Club ===
As of 21 June 2024

Eircom League Annual 2001/02 – by Michael Hayes (2001) Eircom League Annual 2002/03 – by Michael Hayes (2002) Eircom League Annual 2003 – by Michael Hayes (2003) Eircom League Annual 2004 – by Michael Hayes (2004)

Appearances and goals by club, season and competition
Club	Season	League			National cup		League cup		Other		Total	
Club	Season	Division	Apps	Goals	Apps	Goals	Apps	Goals	Apps	Goals	Apps	Goals
St Patrick's Athletic	2001–02	LOI Premier Division	3	0	1	0	1	0	—		5	0
St Patrick's Athletic	2002–03	LOI Premier Division	10	0	0	0	—		—		10	0
St Patrick's Athletic	Total		13	0	1	0	1	0	0	0	15	0
Cork City	2003	LOI Premier Division	33	5	1	0	3	0	—		37	5
Cork City	2004	LOI Premier Division	32	13	0	0	2	0	6 (Note: Appearance(s) in 2004 UEFA Intertoto Cup)	2	40	15
Cork City	2005	LOI Premier Division	11	7	0	0	0	0	0	0	11	7
Cork City	Total		76	25	1	0	5	0	6	2	88	27
Reading	2005–06	Championship	45	18	3	1	3	0	—		51	19
Reading	2006–07	Premier League	32	13	1	0	1	0	—		34	13
Reading	2007–08	Premier League	36	6	0	0	0	0	—		36	6
Reading	2008–09	Championship	41	18	0	0	0	0	1 (Note: Appearance(s) in Football League Championship play-offs)	0	42	18
Reading	Total		154	55	4	1	4	0	1	0	163	56
Wolverhampton Wanderers	2009–10	Premier League	34	9	1	0	2	0	—		37	9
Wolverhampton Wanderers	2010–11	Premier League	26	5	2	1	3	2	—		31	8
Wolverhampton Wanderers	2011–12	Premier League	33	4	2	0	1	0	—		36	4
Wolverhampton Wanderers	2012–13	Championship	42	9	1	0	1	0	—		44	9
Wolverhampton Wanderers	2013–14	League One	23	3	1	0	1	0	0	0	25	3
Wolverhampton Wanderers	2014–15	Championship	6	0	0	0	0	0	—		6	0
Wolverhampton Wanderers	Total		164	30	7	1	8	2	0	0	179	33
Queens Park Rangers (loan)	2013–14	Championship	9	2	0	0	0	0	3	0	12	2
Crystal Palace (loan)	2014–15	Premier League	3	0	1	1	1	0	—		5	1
Colorado Rapids	2015	MLS	20	5	1	0	—		—		21	5
Colorado Rapids	2016	MLS	26	6	1	0	—		4	1	31	7
Colorado Rapids	2017	MLS	25	5	1	0	—		—		26	5
Colorado Rapids	Total		71	16	3	0	-	-	4	1	78	17
Career total			490	128	17	3	19	2	14	3	540	138

=== International ===
As of match played 28 March 2017

Appearances and goals by national team and year
National team	Year	Apps	Goals
Republic of Ireland	2006	5	1
Republic of Ireland	2007	10	4
Republic of Ireland	2008	7	1
Republic of Ireland	2009	9	1
Republic of Ireland	2010	7	2
Republic of Ireland	2011	7	1
Republic of Ireland	2012	7	2
Republic of Ireland	2013	4	0
Republic of Ireland	2014	4	2
Republic of Ireland	2016	1	0
Republic of Ireland	2017	1	0
Total		62	14

Scores and results list Republic of Ireland's goal tally first, score column indicates score after each Doyle goal.

List of international goals scored by Kevin Doyle
No.	Date	Venue	Opponent	Score	Result	Competition
1	15 November 2006	Lansdowne Road, Dublin, Ireland	San Marino	2–0	5–0	UEFA Euro 2008 qualifying
2	28 March 2007	Croke Park, Dublin, Ireland	Slovakia	1–0	1–0	UEFA Euro 2008 qualifying
3	23 May 2007	Giants Stadium, New York, United States	Ecuador	1–1	1–1	Friendly
4	9 September 2007	Tehelné Pole, Bratislava, Slovakia	Slovakia	2–1	2–2	UEFA Euro 2008 qualifying
5	17 November 2007	Millennium Stadium, Cardiff, Wales	Wales	2–1	2–2	UEFA Euro 2008 qualifying
6	6 September 2008	Stadion am Bruchweg, Mainz, Germany	Georgia	1–0	2–1	2010 FIFA World Cup qualification
7	5 September 2009	Neo GSP Stadium, Nicosia, Cyprus	Cyprus	1–0	2–1	2010 FIFA World Cup qualification
8	25 May 2010	RDS Arena, Dublin, Ireland	Paraguay	1–0	2–1	Friendly
9	7 September 2010	Aviva Stadium, Dublin, Ireland	Andorra	2–0	3–1	UEFA Euro 2012 qualifying
10	7 October 2011	Estadi Comunal, Andorra la Vella, Andorra	Andorra	1–0	2–0	UEFA Euro 2012 qualifying
11	7 September 2012	Astana Arena, Astana, Kazakhstan	Kazakhstan	2–1	2–1	2014 FIFA World Cup qualification
12	11 September 2012	Craven Cottage, London, England	Oman	3–0	4–1	Friendly
13	6 June 2014	PPL Park, Philadelphia, United States	Costa Rica	1–0	1–1	Friendly
14	3 September 2014	Aviva Stadium, Dublin, Ireland	Oman	1–0	2–0	Friendly

== Honours ==
Cork City

- League of Ireland: 2005

Reading

- Football League Championship: 2005–06

Wolverhampton Wanderers

- Football League One: 2013–14

Queens Park Rangers

- Football League Championship play-offs: 2014

Republic of Ireland

- Nations Cup: 2011

Individual

- PFA Fans' Player of the Year: 2005–06 Championship
- PFA Team of the Year: 2005–06 Championship
- Reading Player of the Season: 2005–06
- FAI Under 21 International Player of the Year: 2005
- FAI Young International Player of the Year: 2006
- FAI Senior International Player of the Year: 2008, 2010
- FAI International Goal of the Year: 2007 vs. Slovakia, 2010 vs. Andorra, 2012 vs. Kazakhstan
- Football League Championship Player of the Month: September 2008
