= Leroy Lita =

English footballer (born 1984)

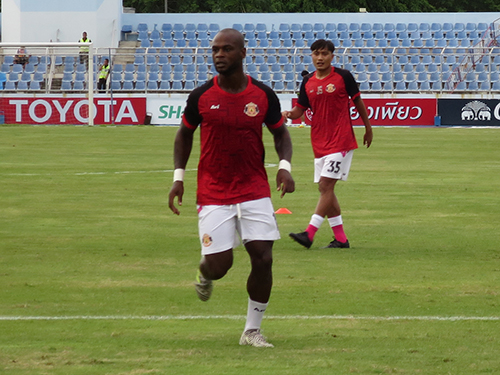
- Lita playing for Sisaket in 2017

Personal information
- Full name: Leroy Halirou Bohari Lita
- Date of birth: 28 December 1984 (age 41)
- Place of birth: Kinshasa, Zaire
- Height: 1.76 m (5 ft 9 in)
- Position: Forward

Team information
- Current team: Barwell; Sunderland Academy (professional development phase coach)

Youth career
- 1999–2001: Chelsea

Senior career*
Years	Team	Apps	(Gls)
2002–2005	Bristol City	85	(31)
2005–2009	Reading	83	(20)
2008	→ Charlton Athletic (loan)	8	(3)
2008–2009	→ Norwich City (loan)	16	(7)
2009–2011	Middlesbrough	78	(20)
2011–2014	Swansea City	18	(2)
2012	→ Birmingham City (loan)	10	(3)
2013	→ Sheffield Wednesday (loan)	17	(6)
2013	→ Brighton & Hove Albion (loan)	5	(1)
2014–2015	Barnsley	19	(2)
2015	→ Notts County (loan)	6	(0)
2015–2016	AO Chania	11	(1)
2016	Yeovil Town	8	(1)
2017	Sisaket	21	(5)
2018	Margate	3	(0)
2019	Salisbury	3	(2)
2019–2020	Chelmsford City	12	(1)
2020–2022	Nuneaton Borough	21	(5)
2022	Stratford Town	11	(3)
2022–2023	Hednesford Town	29	(17)
2023	Ilkeston Town	18	(16)
2023–2024	Nuneaton Borough	22	(6)
2024	Coalville Town	6	(1)
2024–	Barwell	8	(3)

International career
2005–2007	England U21	9	(6)
- * Club domestic league appearances and goals as of 12:33, 2 August 2024 (UTC)

Leroy Halirou Bohari Lita (born 28 December 1984) is an English football player and coach who is currently a professional development phase coach at the Sunderland Academy.

Lita was a product of the Chelsea youth system but never made a first-team appearance for the club; in 2002, he moved to Bristol City and later represented Reading, where his form helped him earn a place with the England under-21 side. He later played for Middlesbrough, Swansea City, Barnsley, Yeovil Town, in Greece for AO Chania and in Thailand for Sisaket, with loan spells at Charlton Athletic, Norwich City, Birmingham City, Sheffield Wednesday, Brighton & Hove Albion and Notts County. He then moved into non-League football.

== Club career ==
=== Bristol City ===
Born in Kinshasa, Lita made his debut for Bristol City at the start of the 2002–03 season, and his first goal followed when he scored a late winner against Port Vale in September 2002. Lita signed his first professional contract for Bristol City at the age of 18 at the start of the 2003–04 season, after being discovered by scout Roger Barton. After Brian Tinnion had taken over from Danny Wilson as manager at the start of the 2004–05 season that Lita really established himself in the first team. That year he scored 29 goals in all competitions for club and one U21 international goal taking his tally to 30 for the season.

=== Reading ===
Lita moved to Reading of the Championship on 13 July 2005 for a then club record fee of £1 million.

Lita scored on his debut at home to Plymouth Argyle with a fine header to equalise, but Reading lost 2–1, however they only lost one more league game during the entire season. Lita made it three goals in his first three games as he scored two well taken goals in Reading's 3–0 win away at Preston. He scored in home wins against Swansea City in the League Cup and Burnley in the league, before scoring an overhead kick in the 3–2 win at home to Crystal Palace. He then endured a barren spell in front of goal, but he ended it with a goal in a 3–0 win at Ipswich, a result which took Reading to the top of the Championship.

He then suffered an injury that kept him out for 6 weeks, but on his return against West Bromwich Albion in the third round of the FA Cup, he produced a high quality display, netting a superb hat trick that included a spectacular second goal with a dipping shot from 25 yards, after a series of one touch passes from the Royals. He found the net in a 4–0 win at home to Norwich City, and followed it up in the next game with two excellent finishes in a 4–3 away win at Crewe Alexandra. He scored for the third league game in a row with a tap in during a 2–0 victory at home to Southampton. He came on as a substitute to score the winner in a 2–1 win at home to Preston but his 2005–06 season ended early in the next game at Burnley when he sustained a broken ankle after landing awkwardly, but Reading still won the Championship title and promotion to the Premier League with a record total of 106 points.

Lita had a promising start to life in the Premiership, in which he netted the winner at home to Middlesbrough on the opening day, a game in which Reading came from 2–0 down to win, 3–2. He ended a goal drought by scoring in a 2–2 draw against Chelsea at Stamford Bridge, the first of ten goals in twelve games, as he scored away at Manchester United in a 3–2 defeat, and scored again in the 6–0 home win over West Ham. He also scored three goals in two games in the FA Cup against Burnley and twice against Birmingham City. His next goal came at home to Wigan in a 3–2 win, and in the next game he scored two late goals in a 2–0 win away at Manchester City. Both goals came from through balls; for the first Lita hit a powerful first time shot from the edge of the box, across the keeper and into the top corner. The second was a finish when through one on one. He would have had a hat trick, but had a goal wrongly disallowed in the first half. Leroy scored again against Manchester United, as he pulled one back in a 3–2 home defeat in the FA Cup.

Lita had suffered some niggling injuries and found himself behind in form Kevin Doyle and Dave Kitson for parts of the season. On 13 April 2007, Lita was banned for three games for allegedly headbutting Talal El Karkouri of Charlton Athletic on 9 April, a charge disputed by both the player and Reading's manager, Steve Coppell. However, Reading still managed to finish eighth in their first ever top division campaign, just missing out on a UEFA Cup place. Following the end of that season speculation surrounding the future of Lita increased as he continued to be linked with several premier league clubs. However the striker said in July that he wanted to stay at Reading "I'm happy here. This is an important year for me and the club and I just want to play and be successful." In a freak occurrence just prior to the start of the 2007–08 season, Lita was faced with a month of downtime after damaging a leg muscle as he stretched in bed upon waking. Coppell told the BBC: "Leroy is in a great deal of pain. It's a point of laughter but a serious business for him because he's going to be out for three or four weeks." Lita found himself largely out of favour in the 2007–08 season, and spent much of it either left out or injured, he also had a loan spell at Charlton Athletic. He only scored one goal in the Premier League that season, it came on the final day against already relegated Derby County with a diving header in a 4–0 away win. But Reading found themselves joining Derby, as they were relegated on goal difference.

==== Loan spells ====
On 5 March 2008, Lita joined Charlton Athletic on a one-month loan deal, after finding his first team opportunities limited at Reading during the 2007–08 season. The loan was later extended to the end of the season, but he was called back from the loan on 19 April for the last three games of the season.

Lita then went to Norwich City for a month-long loan on 1 October. He scored four goals in his initial six game spell including a hat-trick against Wolverhampton Wanderers in a 5–2 victory. Reading and Norwich agreed to extend the loan for another six games until 7 December. Following Norwich's 2–0 win over local rivals Ipswich, it was announced on 8 December that Lita would sign a further third month on loan. Lita went on to score seven goals for Norwich, and in a season which ultimately ended up with relegation, Lita was City's top scorer.

==== Return to Reading ====
Lita returned to Reading and played in the third round FA Cup tie defeat at Cardiff City.

He then made his first league appearance since August, coming on as a sub, to score a goal against Watford at home on 9 January 2009, to make it 4–0. Later, in the same week Lita announced that he had changed for the better, and that he would stay with Reading for the promotion push.

Sheffield United had a seven figure sum accepted by Reading for Lita on 13 January 2009, but the club later withdrew from proceedings after they were not willing to pay the £1.2 million signing-on fee being requested by Lita. On 15 May, Lita, Michael Duberry, Marcus Hahnemann and club captain Graeme Murty were told that their contracts would not be renewed.

=== Middlesbrough ===
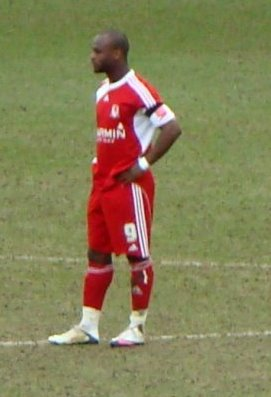
Lita playing for Middlesbrough in 2010

On 3 August 2009, it was announced that he would join Middlesbrough on a free transfer. He made his debut for Middlesbrough on 7 August 2009 in a 0–0 draw with Sheffield United, but had limited opportunities to score. Lita scored his first goal for Middlesbrough against Doncaster Rovers, in a 2–0 win for the Boro. He received a yellow card for removing his shirt in his subsequent celebration. He scored his second goal when returning to his old club Reading in Middlesbrough's 2–0 win on 3 October 2009. His third goal for Middlesbrough came on 21 November 2009 against Nottingham Forest off a rebound off a Julio Arca shot. On 5 December 2009, Lita scored two goals in a 5–1 win against QPR, Middlesbrough's first win under new manager Gordon Strachan. Lita again received a yellow card for his goal celebration. On 26 December 2009, Lita received a red card for an elbow during the win against Scunthorpe, which was the first of his career.

Lita's first goal of the 2010–11 season came on 18 September 2010 against old club Reading and his second followed on 27 November with a headed goal in a 2–2 draw with Hull. On 28 December, Lita's 26th birthday, he scored two goals against Preston in a 3–1 win for Middlesbrough – his first being an individual effort, scoring after a weaving run from the halfway line. Lita scored twice against the club where he began his career, Bristol City, in Middlesbrough's 4–0 away victory on 15 January 2011. He was yellow-carded for his celebration following his first goal, after being subjected to abuse from the home fans. Lita later took the unusual step of using the Bristol City website to apologising to their fans for his actions.

=== Swansea City ===
On 27 July 2011, newly promoted Premier League side Swansea City had a fee of £1.75 million accepted by Middlesbrough for Lita's services. He completed his medical the following week and signed a three-year contract. He made his Swansea debut against Manchester City as a substitute. Lita scored his first Swansea City goal on 17 September 2011 against West Bromwich Albion scoring a header in a 3–0 win.

==== Birmingham City (loan) ====
On 6 September 2012, Lita agreed to join Birmingham City on a three-month emergency loan, the move to be completed when the loan transfer window opened two days later. He scored his first goal for the club on his second appearance, touching in a Paul Caddis cross to open the scoring at home to Bolton Wanderers. After ten league games in which he scored three goals, Lita's loan was terminated on 12 November to allow him to return to his owning club to complete his recovery from a thigh injury.

==== Sheffield Wednesday (loan) ====
Lita made his debut on 26 January 2013, scoring the winning goal against Charlton Athletic after coming on as a substitute for Kieran Lee in the 54th minute. He went on to score his second goal in as many games, through a first half volley in a 3–1 home victory against Brighton & Hove Albion. Leroy scored against Crystal Palace on 23 February to take his tally for Sheffield Wednesday to 3 goals. He uses a trademark celebration when he scores goals for Wednesday, using his fingers to make an "M" which stands for massive. Lita scored his fourth goal of the season for Sheffield Wednesday from a well placed penalty to add to the 3–2 victory against Blackburn Rovers on 6 April. He has also helped them stave off the relegation with a second goal in a 2–0 victory over Middlesbrough, Lita's former club.

==== Brighton & Hove Albion (loan) ====
On 16 October 2013, Lita signed for Brighton on loan until 1 January 2014. Lita made his début as a substitute in the 0–0 draw against Yeovil on 19 October 2013. Lita scored his first goal for the club in a 3–1 away win at Doncaster Rovers. By the end of his loan spell with the Seagulls, Lita had made 5 appearances, scoring 1 goal.

=== Barnsley ===
After his departure from Swansea City, Lita signed a one-year deal at League One side Barnsley on 9 August 2014.

==== Notts County (loan) ====
Lita joined Notts County on loan until the end of the 2014–15 season in March 2015.

=== AO Chania ===
In August 2015, Lita signed for Greek Football League side AO Chania.

=== Yeovil Town ===
On 5 March 2016, Lita joined League Two side Yeovil Town on a short-term deal until the end of the season. He was released at the end of the 2015–16 season.

=== Sisaket ===
On 7 January 2017, Lita joined Thai League T1 side Sisaket.

=== Non-League football ===
In September 2018 Lita joined English non-league club Margate.

At the age of 34, Lita announced his retirement from professional football in August 2019. He joined Haverhill Rovers as a coach at the end of the month, before signing a short-term deal with Southern League club Salisbury in late September. On 8 November, Lita signed a short-term deal for National League South club Chelmsford City; he left at the end of the season having made 14 appearances in all competitions. He then spent 18 months with Southern League club Nuneaton Borough before joining division rivals Stratford Town in January 2022.

==== Hednesford Town, Ilkeston Town ====
On 24 March 2022, Lita signed for Southern League Premier Division Central side Hednesford Town. He scored a hattrick on his debut against Stourbridge. and finished the season with six goals from six appearances, before signing a new deal with the club for the 2022–23 campaign.

After Hednesford parted company with manager Keenen Meakin-Richards and his backroom staff, on 27 August 2022, Lita was announced as caretaker manager before being appointed player-coach after the club appointed Steve Burr as manager on 12 September 2022. On 1 October 2022, Lita scored a four-minute hat-trick as Hednesford beat AFC Rushden & Diamonds 5–0 for their first win of the season. In January 2023, Lita joined Southern League Premier Division Central club Ilkeston Town.

==== Nuneaton Borough, Coalville Town, Barwell ====
On 1 August 2023, Lita re-signed for Nuneaton Borough. He left the club on 8 January 2024, and the following day he and former Borough captain Scott McManus joined another Southern League Premier Central club, Coalville Town. After two months and eight appearances, he was released to continue his tour of the Premier Central with Barwell. He finished the season with three goals from six appearances, and re-signed for the 2024–25 season.

== International career ==
=== England U21 breakthrough ===
Lita turned down the chance to play for DR Congo in favour of pursuing an international career with England, despite having previously stated he wished to represent the country of his birth. He scored on his debut for England U21 with a goal against the Netherlands U21 in a 2–1 loss on 8 February 2005, coming on as a second-half substitute. He had to wait over a year to make his second appearance, again as a substitute, in a 3–1 win over Norway on 28 February 2006. Following excellent goal-scoring form in the Premier League, Lita was awarded with a further cap as a substitute in the 2–2 draw with Spain on 6 February 2007, scoring his second goal in three international appearances.

=== 2007 European U21 Championship ===
Lita was eligible to compete in the 2007 UEFA European Under-21 Football Championship, and was called up to the squad.

In the first group game against the Czech Republic, England were awarded a penalty in the 88th minute which Lita subsequently dragged wide condemning England to a scoreless draw. However, he then scored for England in each of their next three games; a 2–2 draw against Italy, a 2–0 win over Serbia, and a 1–1 (13–12) penalty shoot-out loss to the Netherlands in the semi-finals.

He was named in the UEFA Dream Team for the tournament.

== Career statistics ==
As of match played 9 January 2024

Appearances and goals by club, season and competition
Club	Season	League			National cup		League cup		Other		Total	
Club	Season	Division	Apps	Goals	Apps	Goals	Apps	Goals	Apps	Goals	Apps	Goals
Bristol City	2002–03	Second Division	15	2	1	2	0	0	2 (Note: One appearance in Football League Trophy, one in Second Division play-offs)	0	18	4
Bristol City	2003–04	Second Division	26	5	2	0	1	0	2	0	31	5
Bristol City	2004–05	League One	44	24	2	1	2	2	3 (Note: Appearances in Football League Trophy)	2	51	29
Bristol City	Total		85	31	5	3	3	2	7	2	100	38
Reading	2005–06	Championship	26	11	3	3	3	1	—		32	15
Reading	2006–07	Premier League	33	7	3	4	2	3	—		38	14
Reading	2007–08	Premier League	14	1	2	0	2	1	—		18	2
Reading	2008–09	Championship	10	1	1	0	1	0	—		12	1
Reading	Total		83	20	9	7	8	5	—		100	32
Charlton Athletic (loan)	2007–08	Championship	8	3	—		—		—		8	3
Norwich City (loan)	2008–09	Championship	16	7	—		—		—		16	7
Middlesbrough	2009–10	Championship	40	8	0	0	1	0	—		41	8
Middlesbrough	2010–11	Championship	38	12	1	0	2	0	—		41	12
Middlesbrough	Total		78	20	1	0	3	0	—		82	20
Swansea City	2011–12	Premier League	16	2	1	0	1	0	—		18	2
Swansea City	2012–13	Premier League	0	0	0	0	0	0	—		0	0
Swansea City	2013–14	Premier League	2	0	1	0	0	0	0	0	3	0
Swansea City	Total		18	2	2	0	1	0	0	0	21	2
Birmingham City (loan)	2012–13	Championship	10	3	—		—		—		10	3
Sheffield Wednesday (loan)	2012–13	Championship	17	6	—		—		—		17	6
Brighton & Hove Albion (loan)	2013–14	Championship	5	1	—		—		—		5	1
Barnsley	2014–15	League One	19	2	4	0	1	0	0	0	24	2
Notts County (loan)	2014–15	League One	6	0	—		—		—		6	0
AO Chania	2015–16	Football League	11	1	4	2	—		0	0	15	3
Yeovil Town	2015–16	League Two	8	1	—		—		—		8	1
Sisaket	2017	Thai Premier League	21	5	0	0	—		—		21	5
Margate	2018–19	Isthmian League Premier Division	3	0	1	0	—		0	0	4	0
Salisbury	2019–20	Southern League Premier Division South	3	2	1	0	—		2 (Note: One appearance in FA Trophy, one in Southern League Cup)	0	6	2
Chelmsford City	2019–20	National League South	12	1	0	0	—		2 (Note: Appearances in Essex Senior Cup)	1	14	2
Nuneaton Borough	2020–21	Southern League Premier Division Central	8	4	3	1	—		3 (Note: Appearances in FA Trophy)	1	14	6
Nuneaton Borough	2021–22	Southern League Premier Division Central	13	1	1	0	—		5 (Note: Two appearances and one goal in FA Trophy, one appearance in Southern League Cup, two in Birmingham Senior Cup)	1	19	2
Nuneaton Borough	Total		21	5	4	1	—		8	2	33	8
Hednesford Town	2021–22	Southern League Premier Division Central	6	6	—		—		—		6	6
Hednesford Town	2022–23	Southern League Premier Division Central	23	11	1	1	—		4 (Note: Three appearances and one goal in FA Trophy, one appearance in Birmingham Senior Cup)	1	28	12
Hednesford Town	Total		29	17	1	1	—		4	1	34	18
Ilkeston Town	2022–23	Southern League Premier Division Central	18	16	—		—		0	0	18	16
Nuneaton Borough	2023–24	Southern League Premier Division Central	22	6	1	0	—		6 (Note: Four appearances and three goals in FA Trophy, two appearances and three goals in Birmingham Senior Cup)	6	29	12
Coalville Town	2023–24	Southern League Premier Division Central	6	1	—		—		2 (Note: Appearances in Leicestershire and Rutland Senior Cup)	1	8	2
Barwell	2023–24	Southern League Premier Division Central	8	3	—		—		—		8	3
Career total			507	151	33	14	16	7	31	13	587	184

== Honours ==
Reading

- Football League Championship: 2005–06

Individual

- PFA Team of the Year: 2004–05 League One
