= Seku (given name) =

Seku is a masculine given name. Notable people with the name include:

- Seku Amadu (1773–1845), Malian imam
- Seku Conneh (born 1995), Liberian footballer
- Seku Ture (1922–1984), President of Guinea

== See also ==
- Sekou
