= Peter Castle =

English footballer

Personal information
- Full name: Peter Castle
- Date of birth: 12 March 1987 (age 39)
- Place of birth: Southampton, England
- Height: 6 ft 0 in (1.83 m)
- Position: Centre-back

Youth career
- 1996–2001: AFC Bournemouth
- 2001–2003: Reading

Senior career*
| Years | Team | Apps | (Gls) |
| 2003–2006 | Reading | 1 | (0) |
| 2005 | → St. Albans City (loan) | 2 | (0) |
| 2006 | → Rushden & Diamonds (loan) | 1 | (0) |
| 2006 | Rushden & Diamonds | 0 | (0) |
| 2006 | Staines Town | 9 | (1) |
| 2006 | Eastleigh | 1 | (0) |
| 2006–2010 | Bashley | 107 | (8) |
| 2010 | AFC Totton | 2 | (0) |
| 2010–2011 | Gosport Borough | 14 | (0) |
| 2011 | Lymington Town | 7 | (0) |
| 2011–2012 | GE Hamble | 22 | (0) |
| 2012 | Winchester City | 18 | (2) |
| 2012–2019 | Sholing | 166 | (14) |
| 2019–2020 | Hamble Club | 21 | (2) |
| 2020–2021 | AFC Portchester | 7 | (1) |
| 2022 | Brockenhurst | 3 | (0) |
| 2023 | Sholing | 3 | (0) |
| 2024 | Millbrook | 5 | (0) |

International career
| 2003 | England U16 | 3 | (0) |
- * Club domestic league appearances and goals as of 10:00, 24 July 2024 (UTC)

Peter Castle (born 12 March 1987) is an English footballer who plays as a centre-back. In 2003, he became Reading's youngest ever player aged 16 years and 49 days. At international level, Castle has represented the England under-16s and Ireland under-18s.

== Club career ==
=== Football League ===
Castle began his career at AFC Bournemouth aged nine before moving to Reading in 2001 where he broke into the reserve team at 15. He made his Reading debut as a 79th-minute substitute against Watford on 30 April 2003 along with fellow academy graduate Darren Campbell. At just 16 years and 49 days he became the club's youngest ever player, a record he still holds. Despite making his debut at such a young age, he could not establish himself at Reading and the match against Watford proved to be his first and last appearance for the club.

In September 2005 he moved to St. Albans City on a one-month loan and made six appearances in total before returning to Reading on 11 October. Soon afterwards, Castle was soon loaned out again, this time joining Rushden & Diamonds in January on loan for the rest of the season. He made his debut against Wrexham, starting in a 2–0 home defeat and with his Reading contract due to expire at the end of the season, Castle made his loan move to Rushden permanent on the last day of the transfer window, signing on a short-term deal until the end of the season. He made one further appearance on 24 April in the Maunsell Cup against Peterborough United before being released by the club at the end of the 2005–06 season.

=== Non-league ===
Following his release Castle moved into non-league football. He joined Staines Town in July 2006 but remained there for only a few months, making nine league appearances, before joining Conference South side Eastleigh in October. He made just one first team appearance for Eastleigh, a league match against Weston Super Mare, before moving on to Bashley in the Southern League Division One South & West a month later.

Castle remained at Bashley for three and a half years and helped the club to promotion to the Southern League Premier Division during the 2006–07 season. He made 131 appearances in total, scoring nine goals before moving on to A.F.C. Totton in January 2010. After a brief stay with Totton, Castle joined Southern League Division One South & West rivals Gosport Borough in June, remaining there for one season before switching to Lymington Town on 1 July 2011. Castle was released by the club just three months later though when it emerged he had been playing Sunday league football without permission. Following his release he joined GE Hamble until the end of the 2011–12 season before returning to Southern League football with Winchester City in June 2012. After early exits from the FA Cup and FA Trophy, Castle left Winchester and joined Sholing in September. In April 2019, he reached the milestone of playing 200 matches in all competitions for Sholing. In May 2019, he joined Hamble Club after seven years with Sholing. In February 2020, he joined AFC Portchester. In August 2023, he was back playing for former side Sholing. In July 2024, he joined Millbrook.

== International career ==
While at Reading, Castle represented the England under-16s and the Ireland under-18s at international level.

== Honours ==
FA Vase

- Winner: 2013–14
