= Eric Obinna Chukwunyelu =

Nigerian footballer (born 1981)

Eric Obinna
Personal information
- Full name: Eric Obinna Chukwenyelu
- Date of birth: 10 June 1981 (age 45)
- Place of birth: Owerri, Nigeria
- Height: 1.90 m (6 ft 3 in)
- Position: Striker

Youth career
- Iwuanyanwu Comets
- 1998: Vitória
- 1998: Arsenal

Senior career*
Years	Team	Apps	(Gls)
1999	Saint-Étienne	7	(2)
1999–2000	Red Star Saint-Ouen	4	(0)
2000–2002	Rouen	17	(5)
2002–2004	Stuttgarter Kickers	40	(9)
2004–2005	1. FC Kaiserslautern	0	(0)
2005	Reading	6	(0)
2006	Stevenage Borough	9	(0)
2007	Cassino	36	(1)
2008	Daejeon Citizen	14	(2)
2009	Singapore Armed Forces	?	(?)
2010	Étoile FC	?	(?)
2011	St. George's	14	(3)
2014–2015	US Monastir	10	(0)
2017–2018	Churchill Brothers	5	(0)
- * Club domestic league appearances and goals

Eric Obinna Chukwunyelu // (born 10 June 1981) is a Nigerian former professional footballer who played as a striker.

== Club career ==
Obinna was born in Owerri, Nigeria. He holds French nationality.

Obinna played in Reading's record-breaking promotion season. He did not score in six substitute appearances, but set up several goals.

== Honours ==
Étoile

- Singapore League Cup: 2010
