= Sekou Baradji (footballer, born 1984) =

French professional footballer

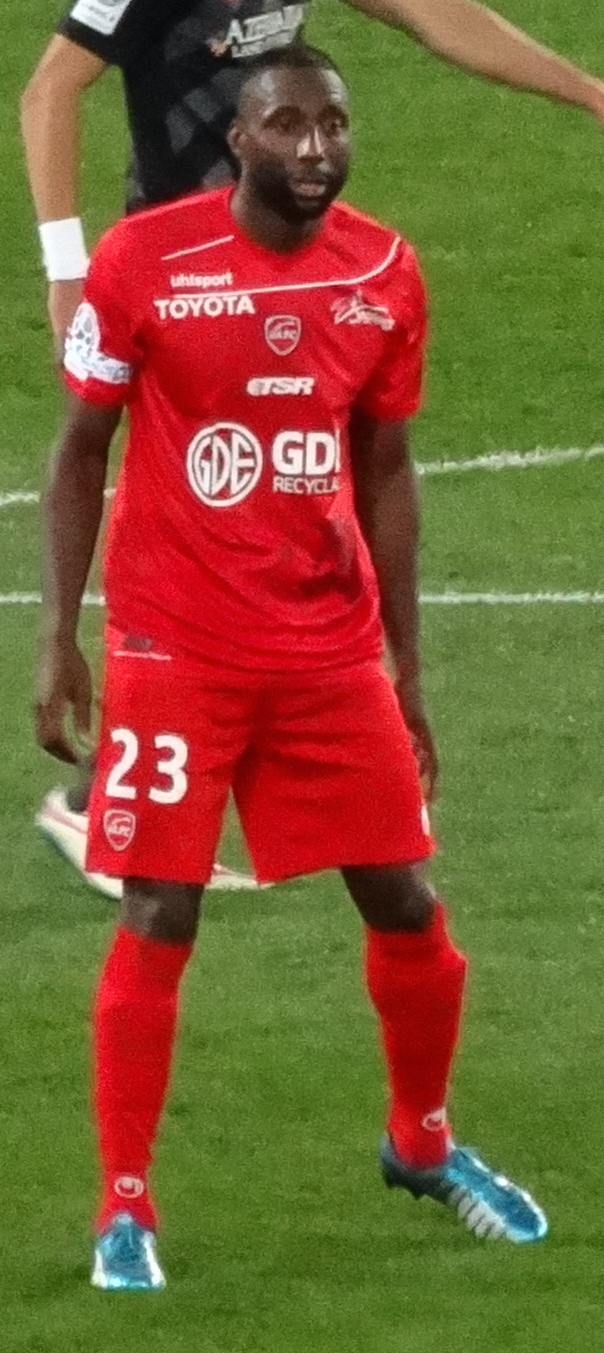

Personal information
- Date of birth: 24 April 1984 (age 42)
- Place of birth: Paris, France
- Height: 1.85 m (6 ft 1 in)
- Position: Midfielder

Team information
- Current team: Istres
- Number: 7

Youth career
- ?–2002: Le Mans

Senior career*
Years	Team	Apps	(Gls)
2003–2005	Le Mans	21	(2)
2005–2006	West Ham United	0	(0)
2005	→ Reading (loan)	1	(0)
2006–2007	Tours	12	(0)
2007–2008	Martigues	22	(1)
2008–2010	Naval 1º de Maio	31	(1)
2011	Hapoel Ra'anana	11	(0)
2011–2014	Dijon	78	(1)
2014–2017	Valenciennes	40	(1)
2017–2018	Amiens	1	(0)
2018–	Istres	6	(1)
- * Club domestic league appearances and goals as of 1 July 2019

Sekou Baradji (born 24 April 1984) is a French professional footballer. A midfielder, he plays for FC Istres. He also holds Gambian citizenship.

== Career in England ==
Baradji signed for West Ham United on the transfer deadline, 31 August 2005. He was immediately loaned to Reading. He had been on trial with Derby; Burnley tried to offer him a contract before West Ham signed the midfielder. He only made three appearances for the Royals, twice in the Football League Cup and once in the league, a substitute appearance against Sheffield United in which Baradji's free kick allowed Brynjar Gunnarsson to score the winner in a pivotal first-against-second match. Reading did not extend Baradji's loan and West Ham later released him.

In 2010 Baradji was on trial with Premier League club Wigan Athletic and played in their pre-season friendly draw with Oldham Athletic. He also travelled to Austria with the team and played in their 4–1 victory over NK Rudar on 26 July 2010.
