= 2005–06 Football League Championship =

Football League Championship
- Season: 2005–06
- Champions: Reading; 1st Championship title 1st 2nd tier title
- Promoted: Reading; Sheffield United; Watford
- Relegated: Crewe Alexandra; Millwall; Brighton & Hove Albion
- Matches: 557
- Goals: 1,341 (2.41 per match)
- Top goalscorer: Marlon King (Watford), 21

The 2005–06 Football League Championship (known as the Coca-Cola Championship for sponsorship reasons) was the second season of the league under its current title and fourteenth season under its current league division format.

Reading dominated the Championship, setting a new league record of 33 league games unbeaten between the opening day defeat by Plymouth Argyle and the loss at Luton Town in February; these were the only league defeats the team would suffer that season. On 25 March 2006 they clinched promotion to the top flight for the first time in their 135-year history thanks to a 1–1 draw away to Leicester City. Coppell's team secured the league title in the following week, with a 5–0 drubbing of Derby County, and they would go on to set a new English league record for the number of points won in a season, with 106. Until 2025, Birmingham City set a new English league record for the number of points in a season, with 111 in the 2024–25 EFL League One season.

== Changes from last season ==
=== Team changes ===
==== From Championship ====
Promoted to Premier League

- Sunderland
- Wigan Athletic
- West Ham United

Relegated to League One

- Gillingham
- Nottingham Forest
- Rotherham United

=== To Championship ===
Promoted from League One

- Luton Town
- Hull City
- Sheffield Wednesday

Relegated from Premier League

- Crystal Palace
- Norwich City
- Southampton

== Team overview ==
=== Stadia and locations ===
Locations of the Football League Championship 2005–2006 teams

Team	Location	Stadium	Capacity
Brighton & Hove Albion	Brighton & Hove	Withdean Stadium	8,850
Burnley	Burnley	Turf Moor	22,546
Cardiff City	Cardiff	Ninian Park	21,508
Coventry City	Coventry	Ricoh Arena	32,602
Crewe Alexandra	Crewe	Alexandra Stadium	10,153
Crystal Palace	London	Selhurst Park	26,309
Derby County	Derby	Pride Park Stadium	33,597
Hull City	Hull	KC Stadium	25,586
Ipswich Town	Ipswich	Portman Road	30,311
Leeds United	Leeds	Elland Road	39,460
Leicester City	Leicester	Walkers Stadium	32,500
Luton Town	Luton	Kenilworth Road	10,226
Millwall	London	The Den	20,146
Norwich City	Norwich	Carrow Road	26,018
Plymouth Argyle	Plymouth	Home Park	18,000
Preston North End	Preston	Deepdale	23,408
Queens Park Rangers	London	Loftus Road	18,360
Reading	Reading	Madejski Stadium	24,161
Sheffield United	Sheffield	Bramall Lane	32,702
Sheffield Wednesday	Sheffield	Hillsborough Stadium	39,812
Southampton	Southampton	St Mary's Stadium	32,690
Stoke City	Stoke	Britannia Stadium	27,740
Watford	Watford	Vicarage Road	17,504
Wolverhampton Wanderers	Wolverhampton	Molineux	27,828

=== Personnel and sponsoring ===
Team	Manager	Kit maker	Main sponsor
Brighton & Hove Albion	(Scotland) Mark McGhee	Erreà	Skint Records
Burnley	(England) Steve Cotterill	Erreà	Hunters Estate Agents
Cardiff City	(England) Dave Jones	Joma	Redrow Houses
Coventry City	(England) Micky Adams	Kit@	Cassidy Group
Crewe Alexandra	(England) Dario Gradi	Diadora	Mornflake Oats
Crystal Palace	(Northern Ireland) Iain Dowie	Diadora	Churchill Insurance
Derby County	(England) Terry Westley	Joma	The Derbyshire
Hull City	(England) Peter Taylor	Diadora	Bonus Electrical
Ipswich Town	(England) Joe Royle	Punch	PowerGen
Leeds United	(England) Kevin Blackwell	Admiral	Whyte & Mackay
Leicester City	(England) Rob Kelly	JJB	Alliance & Leicester
Luton Town	(England) Mike Newell	Diadora	Electrolux
Millwall	(England) Tony Burns & (England) Alan McLeary	Lonsdale	Beko
Norwich City	(Northern Ireland) Nigel Worthington	Xara	Proton Cars (H) / Lotus Cars (A)
Plymouth Argyle	(Wales) Tony Pulis	Puma	Ginsters
Preston North End	(Scotland) Billy Davies	Diadora	Enterprise plc
Queens Park Rangers	(England) Gary Waddock	Le Coq Sportif	Binatone
Reading	(England) Steve Coppell	Puma	Kyocera
Sheffield United	(England) Neil Warnock	Le Coq Sportif	HFS Loans
Sheffield Wednesday	(Scotland) Paul Sturrock	Diadora	Plusnet
Southampton	(Scotland) George Burley	Saints	Friends Provident
Stoke City	(Netherlands) Johan Boskamp	Puma	Britannia Building Society
Watford	(England) Aidy Boothroyd	Diadora	Loans.co.uk
Wolverhampton Wanderers	(England) Glenn Hoddle	Le Coq Sportif	Chaucer Consulting

== League table ==
Pos	Team	Pld	W	D	L	GF	GA	GD	Pts	Promotion, qualification or relegation
1	Reading (C, P)	46	31	13	2	99	32	+67	106	Promotion to the FA Premier League
2	Sheffield United (P)	46	26	12	8	76	46	+30	90	Promotion to the FA Premier League
3	Watford (O, P)	46	22	15	9	77	53	+24	81	Qualification for Championship play-offs
4	Preston North End	46	20	20	6	59	30	+29	80	Qualification for Championship play-offs
5	Leeds United	46	21	15	10	57	38	+19	78	Qualification for Championship play-offs
6	Crystal Palace	46	21	12	13	67	48	+19	75	Qualification for Championship play-offs
7	Wolverhampton Wanderers	46	16	19	11	50	42	+8	67	
8	Coventry City	46	16	15	15	62	65	−3	63	
9	Norwich City	46	18	8	20	56	65	−9	62	
10	Luton Town	46	17	10	19	66	67	−1	61	
11	Cardiff City	46	16	12	18	58	59	−1	60	
12	Southampton	46	13	19	14	49	50	−1	58	
13	Stoke City	46	17	7	22	54	63	−9	58	
14	Plymouth Argyle	46	13	17	16	39	46	−7	56	
15	Ipswich Town	46	14	14	18	53	66	−13	56	
16	Leicester City	46	13	15	18	51	59	−8	54	
17	Burnley	46	14	12	20	46	54	−8	54	
18	Hull City	46	12	16	18	49	55	−6	52	
19	Sheffield Wednesday	46	13	13	20	39	52	−13	52	
20	Derby County	46	10	20	16	53	67	−14	50	
21	Queens Park Rangers	46	12	14	20	50	65	−15	50	
22	Crewe Alexandra (R)	46	9	15	22	57	86	−29	42	Relegation to Football League One
23	Millwall (R)	46	8	16	22	35	62	−27	40	Relegation to Football League One
24	Brighton & Hove Albion (R)	46	7	17	22	39	71	−32	38	Relegation to Football League One

Updated to match(es) played on 2 December 2011. Source: RSSSF
Rules for classification: 1) points; 2) goal difference; 3) number of goals scored.
(C) Champions; (O) Play-off winners; (P) Promoted; (R) Relegated

=== Semi-finals ===
==== First leg ====
5 May 2006
19:45 BST

Leeds United	1–1	Preston North End
Lewis 74'	Statistics	Nugent 48'

Elland Road
Referee: P Crossley

6 May 2006
12:15 BST

Crystal Palace	0–3	Watford
	Statistics	King 46'; Young 67'; Spring 85'

Selhurst Park
Referee: M J Jones

==== Second leg ====
8 May 2006
20:00 BST

Preston North End	0–2	Leeds United
	Statistics	Hulse 56'; Richardson 61'; Crainey (yellow card) 68' (yellow-red card); Cresswell (yellow card) 90' (yellow-red card)

Deepdale
Referee: Mike Thorpe
- Leeds United win 3–1 on aggregate.

9 May 2006
19:45 BST

Watford	0–0	Crystal Palace
	Statistics

Vicarage Road
Referee: Steve Tanner
- Watford win 3–0 on aggregate.

=== Final ===
21 May 2006
15:00 BST

Leeds United	0–3	Watford
	(Details)	DeMerit 25'; Sullivan 57' (o.g.); Henderson 84' (pen.)

Millennium Stadium, Cardiff
Attendance: 64,736
Referee: Mike Dean

== Results ==
Home \ Away	BHA	BUR	CAR	COV	CRE	CRY	DER	HUL	IPS	LEE	LEI	LUT	MIL	NWC	PLY	PNE	QPR	REA	SHE	SHW	SOU	STK	WAT	WOL
Brighton & Hove Albion		0–0	1–2	2–2	2–2	2–3	0–0	2–1	1–1	2–1	1–2	1–1	1–2	1–3	2–0	0–0	1–0	0–2	0–1	0–2	0–2	1–5	0–1	1–1
Burnley	1–0		3–3	4–0	3–0	0–0	2–2	1–0	3–0	1–2	1–0	1–1	2–1	2–0	1–0	0–2	1–0	0–3	1–2	1–2	1–1	1–0	4–1	0–1
Cardiff City	1–1	3–0		0–0	6–1	1–0	0–0	1–0	2–1	2–1	1–0	1–2	1–1	0–1	0–2	2–2	0–0	2–5	0–1	1–0	2–1	3–0	1–3	2–2
Coventry City	2–0	1–0	3–1		1–1	1–4	6–1	0–2	1–1	1–1	1–1	1–0	1–0	2–2	3–1	0–1	3–0	1–1	2–0	2–1	1–1	1–2	3–1	2–0
Crewe Alexandra	2–1	2–1	1–1	4–1		2–2	1–1	2–2	1–2	1–0	2–2	3–1	4–2	1–2	1–2	0–2	3–4	3–4	1–3	2–0	1–1	1–2	0–0	0–4
Crystal Palace	0–1	2–0	1–0	2–0	2–2		2–0	2–0	2–2	1–2	2–0	1–2	1–1	4–1	1–0	1–1	2–1	1–1	2–3	2–0	2–1	2–0	3–1	1–1
Derby County	1–1	3–0	2–1	1–1	5–1	2–1		1–1	3–3	0–0	1–1	1–1	1–0	2–0	1–0	1–1	1–2	2–2	0–1	0–2	2–2	2–1	1–2	0–3
Hull City	2–0	0–0	2–0	1–1	1–0	1–1	2–1		2–0	1–0	1–1	0–1	1–1	1–1	1–0	1–1	0–0	1–1	1–3	1–0	1–1	0–1	1–2	2–3
Ipswich Town	1–2	2–1	1–0	2–2	2–1	0–2	2–0	1–1		1–1	2–0	1–0	1–1	0–1	3–1	0–4	2–2	0–3	1–1	2–1	2–2	1–4	0–1	1–1
Leeds United	3–3	2–0	0–1	3–1	1–0	0–1	3–1	2–0	0–2		2–1	2–1	2–1	2–2	0–0	0–0	2–0	1–1	1–1	3–0	2–1	0–0	2–1	2–0
Leicester City	0–0	0–1	1–2	2–1	1–1	2–0	2–2	3–2	0–0	1–1		0–2	1–1	0–1	1–0	1–2	1–2	1–1	4–2	2–0	0–0	4–2	2–2	1–0
Luton Town	3–0	2–3	3–3	1–2	4–1	2–0	1–0	2–3	1–0	0–0	1–2		2–1	4–2	1–1	3–0	2–0	3–2	1–1	2–2	3–2	2–3	1–2	1–1
Millwall	0–2	1–0	0–0	0–0	1–3	1–1	2–1	1–1	1–2	0–1	0–1	2–1		1–0	1–1	1–2	1–1	0–2	0–4	0–1	0–2	0–1	0–0	0–0
Norwich City	3–0	2–1	1–0	1–1	1–1	1–1	2–0	2–1	1–2	0–1	2–1	2–0	1–1		2–0	0–3	3–2	0–1	2–1	0–1	3–1	2–1	2–3	1–2
Plymouth Argyle	1–0	1–0	0–1	3–1	1–1	2–0	0–2	0–1	2–1	0–3	1–0	1–2	0–0	1–1		0–0	3–1	0–2	0–0	1–1	2–1	2–1	3–3	2–0
Preston North End	0–0	0–0	2–1	3–1	1–0	2–0	1–1	3–0	3–1	2–0	0–0	5–1	2–0	2–0	0–0		1–1	0–3	0–0	0–0	1–1	0–1	1–1	2–0
Queens Park Rangers	1–1	1–1	1–0	0–1	1–2	1–3	1–1	2–2	2–1	0–1	2–3	1–0	1–0	3–0	1–1	0–2		1–2	2–1	0–0	1–0	1–2	1–2	0–0
Reading	5–1	2–1	5–1	2–0	1–0	3–2	5–0	3–1	2–0	1–1	2–0	3–0	5–0	4–0	1–2	2–1	2–1		2–1	2–0	2–0	3–1	1–1	1–1
Sheffield United	3–1	3–0	0–0	2–1	0–0	1–0	2–1	3–2	2–0	1–0	4–1	4–0	2–2	1–3	2–0	2–1	2–3	1–1		1–0	3–0	2–1	1–4	1–0
Sheffield Wednesday	1–1	0–0	1–3	3–2	3–0	0–0	2–1	1–1	0–1	1–0	2–1	0–2	1–2	1–0	0–0	2–0	1–1	1–1	1–2		0–1	0–2	1–1	0–2
Southampton	2–1	1–1	3–2	1–1	2–0	0–0	0–0	1–1	0–2	3–4	2–0	1–0	2–0	1–0	0–0	0–0	1–1	0–0	0–1	3–0		2–0	1–3	0–0
Stoke City	3–0	1–0	0–3	0–1	2–0	1–3	1–2	0–3	2–2	0–1	3–2	2–1	2–1	3–1	0–0	0–0	1–2	0–1	1–1	0–0	1–2		0–3	1–3
Watford	1–1	3–1	2–1	4–0	4–1	1–2	2–2	0–0	2–1	0–0	1–2	1–1	0–2	2–1	1–1	1–2	3–1	0–0	2–3	2–1	3–0	1–0		3–1
Wolverhampton Wanderers	1–0	0–1	2–0	2–2	1–1	2–1	1–1	1–0	1–0	1–0	0–0	2–1	1–2	2–0	1–1	1–1	3–1	0–2	0–0	1–3	0–0	0–0	1–1	

Updated to match(es) played on 10 September 2020. Source:
Legend: Blue = home team win; Yellow = draw; Red = away team win.

== Attendances ==
No.	Club	Average	Change	Highest	Lowest
1	Norwich City	24,952	2.5%	27,470	23,838
2	Sheffield Wednesday	24,853	7.6%	33,439	20,244
3	Ipswich Town	24,253	-5.5%	29,184	22,551
4	Derby County	24,166	-4.2%	30,391	21,434
5	Sheffield United	23,650	20.7%	30,558	17,739
6	Wolverhampton Wanderers	23,624	-11.3%	27,980	21,683
7	Southampton	23,614	-22.9%	30,173	19,086
8	Leeds United	22,355	-23.5%	27,843	18,353
9	Leicester City	22,234	-7.9%	25,578	18,856
10	Coventry City	21,302	32.7%	26,851	16,156
11	Reading	20,207	17.7%	23,845	14,027
12	Hull City	19,841	10.1%	23,486	17,698
13	Crystal Palace	19,457	-19.3%	23,843	17,291
14	Watford	15,450	8.1%	19,842	11,722
15	Preston North End	14,619	5.3%	19,350	12,453
16	Stoke City	14,432	-12.3%	20,408	10,121
17	Plymouth Argyle	13,776	-16.1%	17,726	10,460
18	Queens Park Rangers	13,441	-16.3%	16,152	10,901
19	Burnley	12,462	-1.4%	17,912	10,431
20	Cardiff City	11,720	-9.7%	16,403	8,724
21	Millwall	9,529	-18.2%	13,209	7,108
22	Luton Town	9,139	15.1%	10,248	7,474
23	Brighton & Hove Albion	6,802	5.8%	7,999	5,859
24	Crewe Alexandra	6,732	-9.1%	8,942	5,686
