= 1999–2000 Walsall F.C. season =

Walsall
1999–2000 season
- Chairman: (England) Jeff Bonser
- Manager: (England) Ray Graydon
- Stadium: Bescot Stadium
- First Division: 22nd (relegated)
- FA Cup: Third round
- League Cup: Second round
- Top goalscorer: Michael Ricketts (11)
- Highest home attendance: 9,422 (vs. Wolverhampton Wanderers, 29 January 2000)
- Lowest home attendance: 5,384 (vs. Grimsby Town, 4 March 2000)
- Average home league attendance: 6,779
Home colours

During the 1999–2000 English football season, Walsall F.C. competed in the Football League First Division.

== Season summary ==
In the 1999–2000 season, Walsall were relegated on the final day despite derby wins over local rivals Wolverhampton Wanderers, Birmingham City and West Bromwich Albion earlier in the campaign.

== Final league table ==
Pos	Team	Pld	W	D	L	GF	GA	GD	Pts	Qualification or relegation
20	Grimsby Town	46	13	12	21	41	67	−26	51	
21	West Bromwich Albion	46	10	19	17	43	60	−17	49	
22	Walsall (R)	46	11	13	22	52	77	−25	46	Relegation to the Second Division
23	Port Vale (R)	46	7	15	24	48	69	−21	36	Relegation to the Second Division
24	Swindon Town (R)	46	8	12	26	38	77	−39	36	Relegation to the Second Division

Rules for classification: 1) Points; 2) Goal difference; 3) Goals scored
(R) Relegated

== Results ==
Walsall's score comes first

=== Legend ===
Win	Draw	Loss

=== Football League First Division ===
Date	Opponent	Venue	Result	Attendance	Scorers
7 August 1999	Swindon Town	H	0–0	6,437	
14 August 1999	Sheffield United	A	1–1	12,581	Wrack
21 August 1999	Crewe Alexandra	H	1–4	6,238	Robins
28 August 1999	Wolverhampton Wanderers	A	2–1	24,439	Barras, Rammell
30 August 1999	Norwich City	H	2–2	6,187	Barras, Wrack
4 September 1999	Nottingham Forest	A	1–4	15,081	Robins
11 September 1999	Grimsby Town	A	0–1	6,014	
18 September 1999	Manchester City	H	0–1	7,260	
25 September 1999	Blackburn Rovers	A	0–2	18,232	
2 October 1999	Stockport County	H	1–2	5,492	Ricketts
8 October 1999	Birmingham City	H	1–0	7,164	Rammell
16 October 1999	West Bromwich Albion	A	1–0	19,562	Rammell
19 October 1999	Portsmouth	A	1–5	9,042	Wrack
23 October 1999	Ipswich Town	H	0–1	6,526	
25 October 1999	Blackburn Rovers	H	1–1	6,484	Ricketts
30 October 1999	Stockport County	A	1–1	6,592	Ricketts
6 November 1999	Charlton Athletic	A	1–2	18,663	Bukrán
12 November 1999	Port Vale	H	0–0	6,190	
20 November 1999	Queens Park Rangers	A	1–2	10,058	Ricketts
23 November 1999	Huddersfield Town	H	2–0	5,860	Robins, Rammell
26 November 1999	Fulham	H	1–3	5,449	Matías
4 December 1999	Swindon Town	A	1–1	7,186	Wrack
18 December 1999	Barnsley	A	2–3	13,300	Keates, Roper
26 December 1999	Tranmere Rovers	H	1–2	7,214	Bukrán
28 December 1999	Crystal Palace	A	2–3	13,943	Ricketts (2)
3 January 2000	Bolton Wanderers	H	2–0	6,873	Ricketts, Matías
15 January 2000	Sheffield United	H	2–1	6,222	Viveash, Robins
22 January 2000	Crewe Alexandra	A	3–2	6,275	Bennett, Ricketts, Harper
29 January 2000	Wolverhampton Wanderers	H	1–1	9,422	Barras
5 February 2000	Norwich City	A	1–1	16,837	Ricketts
12 February 2000	Nottingham Forest	H	0–2	8,027	
19 February 2000	Fulham	A	0–2	10,540	
26 February 2000	Manchester City	A	1–1	32,438	Matías
4 March 2000	Grimsby Town	H	1–0	5,384	Robins
7 March 2000	Charlton Athletic	H	2–4	6,227	Robins (pen), Vlachos
11 March 2000	Huddersfield Town	A	1–1	12,424	Eyjólfsson
18 March 2000	Queens Park Rangers	H	2–3	6,414	Barras, Hall
21 March 2000	Port Vale	A	2–1	5,737	Matías, Fenton
25 March 2000	Tranmere Rovers	A	1–1	6,537	Ricketts (pen)
1 April 2000	Barnsley	H	1–4	7,218	Hall
8 April 2000	Bolton Wanderers	A	3–4	11,777	Hall, Ricketts, Bennett
15 April 2000	Crystal Palace	H	2–2	6,323	Matías, Hall
22 April 2000	West Bromwich Albion	H	2–1	9,161	Rammell, Bennett
24 April 2000	Birmingham City	A	0–2	24,268	
29 April 2000	Portsmouth	H	1–0	8,151	Matías
7 May 2000	Ipswich Town	A	0–2	21,908	

=== FA Cup ===
Round	Date	Opponent	Venue	Result	Attendance	Goalscorers
R3	11 December 1999	Gillingham	H	1–1	4,314	Robins (pen)
R3R	8 January 2000	Gillingham	A	1–2	6,538	Lárusson

=== League Cup ===
Round	Date	Opponent	Venue	Result	Attendance	Goalscorers
R1 1st Leg	10 August 1999	Plymouth Argyle	H	4–1	3,502	Bukrán, Robins, Eyjólfsson
R1 2nd Leg	24 August 1999	Plymouth Argyle	A	4–1 (won 8–2 on agg)	1,834	Keates, Barras, Bukrán, Eyjólfsson
R2 1st Leg	14 September 1999	Sunderland	A	2–3	14,388	Bukrán, Rae (own goal)
R2 2nd Leg	21 September 1999	Sunderland	H	0–5 (lost 2–8 on agg)	5,109	

== Squad ==
Note: Flags indicate national team as defined under FIFA eligibility rules; some limited exceptions apply. Players may hold more than one non-FIFA nationality.

No.	Pos.	Nation	Player
1	GK	(England) ENG	Jimmy Walker
2	DF	(England) ENG	Chris Marsh
3	DF	(England) ENG	Ian Brightwell
4	DF	(England) ENG	Adi Viveash
5	DF	(Greece) GRE	Michalis Vlachos
6	DF	(England) ENG	Ian Roper
7	MF	(England) ENG	Darren Wrack
8	FW	(England) ENG	Mark Robins
9	FW	(England) ENG	Andy Rammell
10	MF	(England) ENG	Dean Keates
11	DF	(Argentina) ARG	Gino Padula
14	MF	(England) ENG	Jason Brissett
15	MF	(Iceland) ISL	Bjarni Lárusson

No.	Pos.	Nation	Player
16	MF	(Iceland) ISL	Sigurður Ragnar Eyjólfsson
17	GK	(England) ENG	Carl Emberson
19	MF	(Jamaica) JAM	Paul Hall
20	MF	(England) ENG	Graham Fenton
21	DF	(England) ENG	Matt Gadsby
22	FW	(England) ENG	Michael Ricketts
23	FW	(England) ENG	Alfie Carter
24	DF	(England) ENG	Dion Scott
25	DF	(England) ENG	Tony Barras
26	MF	(Hungary) HUN	Gábor Bukrán
27	MF	(Spain) ESP	Pedro Matías
28	FW	(England) ENG	Jamie Forrester
29	MF	(Scotland) SCO	Tom Bennett (on loan from Stockport County)

=== Left club during season ===
Note: Flags indicate national team as defined under FIFA eligibility rules; some limited exceptions apply. Players may hold more than one non-FIFA nationality.

No.	Pos.	Nation	Player
3	MF	(England) ENG	Neil Pointon (to Chesterfield)
5	DF	(England) ENG	Richard Green (to Northampton Town)
11	MF	(England) ENG	Tony Daley (to Forest Green Rovers)
11	FW	(France) FRA	Samassi Abou (returned to West Ham United)
12	MF	(Bosnia and Herzegovina) BIH	Darko Mavrak (released)
18	MF	(England) ENG	Wayne Thomas (to Shrewsbury Town)

No.	Pos.	Nation	Player
19	FW	(England) ENG	Clive Platt (to Rochdale)
19	DF	(England) ENG	Lee Todd (returned to Bradford City)
19	MF	(Scotland) SCO	Kevin Harper (returned to Derby County)
20	MF	(Sierra Leone) SLE	John Keister (to Chester City)
28	FW	(Brazil) BRA	Marcus di Giuseppe (to Universitario de Deportes)
