= 2001–02 Walsall F.C. season =

Walsall
2001–02 season
- Chairman: Jeff Bonser
- Manager: Ray Graydon (until 22 January); Colin Lee (from 24 January)
- Stadium: Bescot Stadium
- First Division: 18th
- FA Cup: Fifth round
- League Cup: Second round
- Top goalscorer: League: Leitão (8); All: Leitão (10)
- Average home league attendance: 6,832
Home colours

During the 2001–02 English football season, Walsall competed in the Football League First Division.

== Season summary ==
After a disappointing start to the 2001–02 season, pressure was piling on Graydon and following an abject performance and 1–0 defeat, against local rivals West Brom, Jeff Bonser dismissed Graydon. His replacement, ex-Wolves manager Colin Lee polarised supporters, but ultimately proved to be a success. The style of football improved and Lee's signings improved the team dramatically. Relegation was avoided thanks to vital away wins against Nottingham Forest and Sheffield United.

== Final league table ==
Pos	Team	Pld	W	D	L	GF	GA	GD	Pts
16	Nottingham Forest	46	12	18	16	50	51	−1	54
17	Portsmouth	46	13	14	19	60	72	−12	53
18	Walsall	46	13	12	21	51	71	−20	51
19	Grimsby Town	46	12	14	20	50	72	−22	50
20	Sheffield Wednesday	46	12	14	20	49	71	−22	50

Rules for classification: 1) Points; 2) Goal difference; 3) Goals scored

Results summary

Overall								Home						Away					
Pld	W	D	L	GF	GA	GD	Pts	W	D	L	GF	GA	GD	W	D	L	GF	GA	GD
46	13	12	21	51	71	−20	51	10	6	7	29	27	+2	3	6	14	22	44	−22

Source: 2001-02 Football League First Division table

Results by round

Round	1	2	3	4	5	6	7	8	9	10	11	12	13	14	15	16	17	18	19	20	21	22	23	24	25	26	27	28	29	30	31	32	33	34	35	36	37	38	39	40	41	42	43	44	45	46
Ground	H	A	H	A	A	A	H	H	A	H	H	H	A	H	A	A	H	H	A	A	H	A	A	H	A	H	H	A	H	A	H	A	H	A	H	A	A	H	A	H	A	H	A	H	A	H
Result	W	D	L	L	L	L	D	L	L	D	W	L	L	W	L	W	D	W	L	D	L	L	L	W	L	W	L	D	L	L	W	D	L	L	D	L	D	W	D	W	L	D	W	W	W	D
Position	8	6	11	16	20	22	22	22	23	23	20	21	23	21	22	21	22	19	20	19	21	21	23	20	22	21	21	21	21	22	22	21	22	22	22	23	23	23	23	22	23	23	22	20	18	18

Source: 11v11.com: 2001-02 Walsall results
A = Away; H = Home; W = Win; D = Draw; L = Loss

== Results ==
Walsall's score comes first

=== Legend ===
Win	Draw	Loss

=== Football League First Division ===
Date	Opponent	Venue	Result	Attendance	Scorers
11 August 2001	West Bromwich Albion	H	2–1	9,181	Leitão, Barras
18 August 2001	Preston North End	A	1–1	11,402	Herivelto
25 August 2001	Birmingham City	H	1–2	7,245	Herivelto
27 August 2001	Watford	A	1–2	14,652	Leitão
8 September 2001	Crewe Alexandra	A	1–2	6,809	Simpson
15 September 2001	Burnley	A	2–5	14,019	Wrack, Davis (own goal)
18 September 2001	Portsmouth	H	0–0	6,153	
21 September 2001	Wolverhampton Wanderers	H	0–3	8,327	
25 September 2001	Manchester City	A	0–3	31,525	
29 September 2001	Millwall	H	0–0	6,289	
9 October 2001	Norwich City	H	2–0	5,713	Barras, Byfield
14 October 2001	Coventry City	H	0–1	7,515	
20 October 2001	Sheffield Wednesday	A	1–2	16,275	Byfield
23 October 2001	Rotherham United	H	3–2	6,162	Matías (2), Wrack
27 October 2001	Gillingham	A	0–2	7,548	
30 October 2001	Stockport County	A	2–0	4,553	Angell, Thøgersen
3 November 2001	Crystal Palace	H	2–2	6,795	Barras (2)
11 November 2001	Nottingham Forest	H	2–0	6,754	Matías, Angell
17 November 2001	Bradford City	A	0–2	14,251	
20 November 2001	Wimbledon	A	2–2	4,249	Thøgersen, Leitão
24 November 2001	Sheffield United	H	1–2	6,415	Wrack
1 December 2001	Rotherham United	A	0–2	6,273	
8 December 2001	Barnsley	A	1–4	12,509	Aranalde
15 December 2001	Grimsby Town	H	4–0	5,080	Biancalani, Angell, Leitão, Herivelto
22 December 2001	Birmingham City	A	0–1	20,127	
26 December 2001	Crewe Alexandra	H	2–1	7,325	Aranalde, Biancalani
29 December 2001	Watford	H	0–3	6,882	
1 January 2002	Norwich City	A	1–1	19,434	Tillson
12 January 2002	Preston North End	H	1–2	6,314	Wrack
20 January 2002	West Bromwich Albion	A	0–1	20,290	
29 January 2002	Wimbledon	H	2–1	5,388	Leitão, Carbon
2 February 2002	Millwall	A	2–2	11,285	Matías, Keates (pen)
9 February 2002	Sheffield Wednesday	H	0–3	8,290	
19 February 2002	Coventry City	A	1–2	13,736	Holdsworth
23 February 2002	Manchester City	H	0–0	7,618	
26 February 2002	Wolverhampton Wanderers	A	0–3	27,043	
2 March 2002	Portsmouth	A	1–1	13,203	O'Connor
5 March 2002	Burnley	H	1–0	5,611	Marcelo
9 March 2002	Grimsby Town	A	2–2	7,016	Leitão, Byfield
16 March 2002	Barnsley	H	2–1	7,495	Byfield, Goodman
23 March 2002	Crystal Palace	A	0–2	21,038	
30 March 2002	Gillingham	H	1–1	6,190	Herivelto
1 April 2002	Nottingham Forest	A	3–2	16,659	Simpson, Matías, Corica
6 April 2002	Stockport County	H	1–0	6,322	Leitão
13 April 2002	Sheffield United	A	1–0	20,520	Leitão
21 April 2002	Bradford City	H	2–2	8,079	Corica (2)

=== FA Cup ===
Round	Date	Opponent	Venue	Result	Attendance	Goalscorers
R3	8 January 2002	Bradford City	H	2–0	4,509	Bennett, Angell
R4	26 January 2002	Charlton Athletic	A	2–1	18,573	Leitão (2)
R5	16 February 2002	Fulham	H	1–2	8,766	Byfield

=== League Cup ===
Round	Date	Opponent	Venue	Result	Attendance	Goalscorers
R1	21 August 2001	Exeter City	A	1–0	1,993	Herivelto
R2	11 September 2001	Bolton Wanderers	A	3–4 (a.e.t.)	5,761	Wrack, Byfield, Barras

== Squad ==
Note: Flags indicate national team as defined under FIFA eligibility rules; some limited exceptions apply. Players may hold more than one non-FIFA nationality.

No.	Pos.	Nation	Player
1	GK	ENG	Jimmy Walker
2	DF	ENG	Matt Carbon
3	DF	NED	Gus Uhlenbeek (on loan from Sheffield United)
4	MF	SCO	Tom Bennett
5	MF	ENG	Martin O'Connor
6	DF	ENG	Ian Roper
7	MF	ENG	Darren Wrack
9	FW	ENG	Don Goodman
10	MF	ENG	Dean Keates
12	MF	JAM	Fitzroy Simpson
14	FW	POR	Jorge Leitão
15	DF	ESP	Zigor Aranalde
16	MF	NGA	Adolphus Ofodile
17	GK	ENG	Lee Harper

No.	Pos.	Nation	Player
18	MF	ENG	Mark Wright
19	MF	POR	Carlos André (on loan from Vitória S.C.)
20	MF	ENG	Gary Birch
21	DF	ENG	Matt Gadsby
22	FW	ENG	Karl Hawley
23	MF	POR	Carlos Garrocho
24	DF	ENG	Dion Scott
25	DF	ENG	Tony Barras
26	MF	BRA	Moreira Herivelto
27	MF	ESP	Pedro Matías
28	DF	FRA	Frédéric Biancalani
29	DF	ENG	David Holdsworth (on loan from Birmingham City)
31	FW	BRA	Marcelo
32	MF	AUS	Steve Corica

=== Left club during season ===
Note: Flags indicate national team as defined under FIFA eligibility rules; some limited exceptions apply. Players may hold more than one non-FIFA nationality.

No.	Pos.	Nation	Player
23	DF	ENG	Ian Gaunt (Released)
19	MF	JAM	Paul Hall (to Rushden & Diamonds)
29	MF	ENG	Tom Curtis (on loan from Portsmouth)
30	DF	ENG	Steve Chettle (on loan from Barnsley)
29	DF	DEN	Thomas Thøgersen (on loan from Portsmouth)

No.	Pos.	Nation	Player
5	DF	ENG	Andy Tillson (to Rushden & Diamonds)
33	DF	SCO	Greg Shields (on loan from Charlton Athletic)
3	DF	ENG	Ian Brightwell (to Stoke City)
11	FW	ENG	Brett Angell (to Rushden & Diamonds)
8	FW	ENG	Darren Byfield (to Rotherham United)

=== Reserve squad ===
Note: Flags indicate national team as defined under FIFA eligibility rules; some limited exceptions apply. Players may hold more than one non-FIFA nationality.

No.	Pos.	Nation	Player
-	GK	ENG	Dean Coleman
-	DF	ENG	Julian Bennett
-	MF	FRA	Xavier Barrau
-	MF	AUS	Dino Mennillo

No.	Pos.	Nation	Player
-	MF	ENG	Craig Stanley
-	FW	ENG	Taiwo Atieno
-	FW	ENG	Andy Bishop
-	FW	ENG	Matty Fryatt
