= 2002–03 Walsall F.C. season =

Walsall
2002–03 season
- Chairman: Jeff Bonser
- Manager: Colin Lee
- Stadium: Bescot Stadium
- First Division: 17th
- FA Cup: Fifth round
- League Cup: Third round
- Top goalscorer: League: José Júnior (15); All: José Júnior (16)
- Highest home attendance: 11,037 (vs. Wolverhampton Wanderers, 11 January)
- Lowest home attendance: 3,847 (vs. Shrewsbury Town, 10 September)
- Average home league attendance: 6,978
Home colours

During the 2002–03 English football season, Walsall competed in the Football League First Division. It was the club's second consecutive season at that level.

== Season summary ==
Walsall managed to avoid relegation to extend their stay in English football's second tier to a third season. Much of their success was down to the signing of key players, such as ex-Tottenham Hotspur midfielder Vinny Samways, returning to English football after a six-year spell in Spain.

== Kit ==
Xara became Walsall's new kit manufacturers. Banks's remained the kit sponsors.

== Final league table ==
Pos	Team	Pld	W	D	L	GF	GA	GD	Pts
15	Rotherham United	46	15	14	17	62	62	0	59
16	Burnley	46	15	10	21	65	89	−24	55
17	Walsall	46	15	9	22	57	69	−12	54
18	Derby County	46	15	7	24	55	74	−19	52
19	Bradford City	46	14	10	22	51	73	−22	52

Updated to match(es) played on 11 May 2003. Source: Soccerway
Rules for classification: 1) points; 2) goal difference; 3) number of goals scored.

== Results ==
Walsall's score comes first

=== Legend ===
Win	Draw	Loss

=== Football League First Division ===
Date	Opponent	Venue	Result	Attendance	Scorers
10 August 2002	Ipswich Town	H	0–2	5,253	
14 August 2002	Wolverhampton Wanderers	A	1–3	27,904	Herivelto
17 August 2002	Sheffield United	A	1–1	14,011	Corica
24 August 2002	Nottingham Forest	H	2–1	5,096	Sonner (pen), Wrack
26 August 2002	Brighton & Hove Albion	A	2–0	6,519	Corica, Leitão
31 August 2002	Reading	H	0–2	5,327	
7 September 2002	Watford	A	0–2	10,528	
14 September 2002	Bradford City	H	0–1	4,678	
17 September 2002	Rotherham United	H	3–4	4,648	Zdrilic (2), Leitão
21 September 2002	Millwall	A	3–0	7,525	Zdrilic, Wrack, Leitão
28 September 2002	Sheffield Wednesday	H	1–0	6,792	Simpson
5 October 2002	Derby County	A	2–2	25,247	Corica, Aranalde (pen)
12 October 2002	Burnley	A	1–2	12,907	Birch
19 October 2002	Preston North End	H	3–3	6,832	Leitão, Júnior, Aranalde (pen)
26 October 2002	Coventry City	A	0–0	14,544	
29 October 2002	Crystal Palace	H	3–4	6,368	Corica, Júnior (2)
2 November 2002	Stoke City	H	4–2	6,391	Leitão (2), Júnior, Aranalde (pen)
9 November 2002	Leicester City	A	0–2	25,243	
16 November 2002	Wimbledon	A	2–3	1,255	Júnior, Sonner (pen)
23 November 2002	Gillingham	H	1–0	6,630	Júnior
30 November 2002	Portsmouth	A	2–3	17,701	Sonner (2 pens)
7 December 2002	Grimsby Town	H	3–1	5,888	Júnior, Leitão, Wrack
14 December 2002	Wimbledon	H	2–0	6,596	Wrack, Júnior
21 December 2002	Norwich City	A	1–2	19,872	Easton (own goal)
26 December 2002	Sheffield United	H	0–1	10,459	
28 December 2002	Ipswich Town	A	2–3	26,550	Wrack (2)
1 January 2003	Nottingham Forest	A	1–1	28,441	Ainsworth
11 January 2003	Wolverhampton Wanderers	H	0–1	11,037	
18 January 2003	Reading	A	0–0	11,786	
1 February 2003	Brighton & Hove Albion	H	1–0	8,413	Leitão
8 February 2003	Leicester City	H	1–4	8,741	O'Connor
22 February 2003	Watford	H	2–0	7,705	Júnior, Leitão
26 February 2003	Stoke City	A	0–1	10,409	
1 March 2003	Bradford City	A	2–1	10,893	Robinson, Matías
4 March 2003	Rotherham United	A	0–0	5,792	
8 March 2003	Millwall	H	1–2	6,647	Júnior
15 March 2003	Burnley	H	3–2	6,327	Leitão, Carbon, Matías
18 March 2003	Preston North End	A	0–5	11,170	
22 March 2003	Crystal Palace	A	0–2	19,102	
5 April 2003	Portsmouth	H	1–2	7,899	Júnior
12 April 2003	Gillingham	A	1–0	6,972	Leitão
15 April 2003	Coventry City	H	0–0	7,337	
19 April 2003	Norwich City	H	0–0	7,018	
21 April 2003	Grimsby Town	A	1–0	4,618	Júnior
26 April 2003	Derby County	H	3–2	8,416	Júnior (3)
4 May 2003	Sheffield Wednesday	A	1–2	20,864	Matías

=== FA Cup ===
Round	Date	Opponent	Venue	Result	Attendance	Goalscorers
R3	4 January 2003	Reading	H	0–0	5,987	
R3R	14 January 2003	Reading	A	1–1 (won 4–1 on pens)	8,767	Wrack
R4	25 January 2003	Wimbledon	H	1–0	6,693	Zdrilic
R5	15 February 2003	Sheffield United	A	0–2	17,510	

=== League Cup ===
Round	Date	Opponent	Venue	Result	Attendance	Goalscorers
R1	10 September 2002	Shrewsbury Town	H	1–0	3,847	Leitão
R2	2 October 2002	Nottingham Forest	A	2–1	6,343	Leitão, Júnior
R3	6 November 2002	Blackburn Rovers	A	2–2 (lost 4–5 on pens)	9,486	Aranalde (pen), Zdrilic

== First-team squad ==
Squad at end of season

Note: Flags indicate national team as defined under FIFA eligibility rules; some limited exceptions apply. Players may hold more than one non-FIFA nationality.

No.	Pos.	Nation	Player
1	GK	(England) ENG	Jimmy Walker
2	MF	(England) ENG	Darren Bazeley
3	DF	(Spain) ESP	Zigor Aranalde
4	DF	(England) ENG	Matt Carbon
5	DF	(New Zealand) NZL	Danny Hay
6	DF	(England) ENG	Ian Roper
7	MF	(England) ENG	Darren Wrack
8	MF	(England) ENG	Martin O'Connor
9	FW	(Portugal) POR	Jorge Leitão
10	MF	(Australia) AUS	Steve Corica
11	MF	(Spain) ESP	Pedro Matías
12	MF	(Wales) WAL	Carl Robinson (on loan from Portsmouth)
14	FW	(Australia) AUS	David Zdrilic

No.	Pos.	Nation	Player
15	DF	(England) ENG	Tony Barras
16	MF	(Northern Ireland) NIR	Danny Sonner
17	FW	(England) ENG	Gary Birch
18	MF	(England) ENG	Gareth Ainsworth (on loan from Wimbledon)
19	MF	(England) ENG	Mark Wright
24	MF	(England) ENG	Vinny Samways
25	FW	(Brazil) BRA	José Júnior (on loan from Treze)
26	MF	(Jamaica) JAM	Fitzroy Simpson
27	GK	(England) ENG	Gavin Ward
29	MF	(England) ENG	Chris Shuker (on loan from Manchester City)
29	MF	(Jamaica) JAM	Jamie Lawrence
30	DF	(France) FRA	Ludovic Pollet (on loan from Wolverhampton Wanderers)
33	MF	(England) ENG	Neil Emblen (on loan from Norwich City)

=== Left club during season ===
Note: Flags indicate national team as defined under FIFA eligibility rules; some limited exceptions apply. Players may hold more than one non-FIFA nationality.

No.	Pos.	Nation	Player
12	FW	(Portugal) POR	Dani Rodrigues (to Ionikos)
13	MF	(Brazil) BRA	Moreira Herivelto (to Ionikos)

No.	Pos.	Nation	Player
18	DF	(England) ENG	Matt Gadsby (to Mansfield Town)
24	MF	(Spain) ESP	Roberto Martínez (to Swansea City)

== Reserve squad ==
Note: Flags indicate national team as defined under FIFA eligibility rules; some limited exceptions apply. Players may hold more than one non-FIFA nationality.

No.	Pos.	Nation	Player
20	FW	(England) ENG	Karl Hawley
21	MF	(England) ENG	Craig Stanley
22	FW	(England) ENG	Andy Bishop

No.	Pos.	Nation	Player
23	MF	(England) ENG	Nick Smith
28	GK	(England) ENG	Matthew Harris
31	MF	(France) FRA	Jean-Philippe Javary (on loan from Sheffield United)
