= 2001 Football League Second Division play-off final =

English association football match in 2001

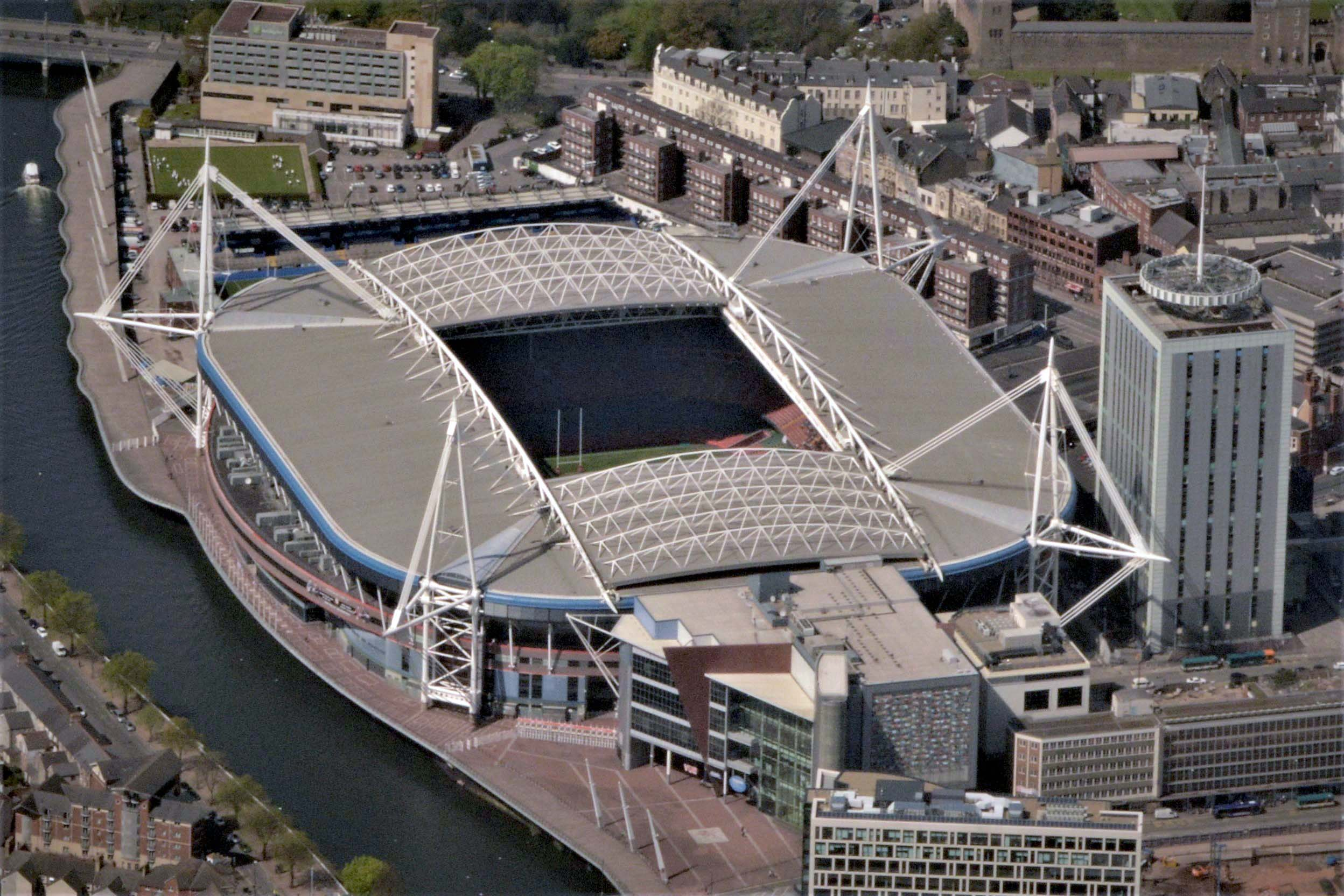
- The final took place at the Millennium Stadium.
Walsall	Reading
3	2
- After extra time
- Date: 27 May 2001
- Venue: Millennium Stadium, Cardiff
- Referee: Eddie Wolstenholme
- Attendance: 50,496

The 2001 Football League Second Division play-off final was an association football match which was played on 27 May 2001 at the Millennium Stadium, Cardiff, between Walsall and Reading. It was to determine the third and final team to gain promotion from the Football League Second Division to the First Division. The top two teams of the 2000–01 Football League Second Division league, Millwall and Rotherham United, gained automatic promotion to the First Division, while the teams placed from third to sixth place in the table took part in play-offs. The winners of the play-off semi-finals competed for the final place for the 2001–02 season in the First Division. The losing semi-finalists were Wigan Athletic and Stoke City who had been defeated by Reading and Walsall respectively. It was the first season that the play-off finals were contested at the Millennium Stadium during the redevelopment of Wembley Stadium.

The match was refereed by Eddie Wolstenholme in front of a crowd of 50,496. Reading took the lead through Jamie Cureton half an hour into the game with a volley that crept over the line having struck Jimmy Walker in the Walsall goal. The half ended with the score 1–0 to Reading. Three minutes into the second half, Walsall levelled the game after Don Goodman scored from an Andy Tillson header. With the score 1–1 after 90 minutes, the match went into extra time. Less than a minute into the first half of extra time, Martin Butler's header from a James Harper throw-in put Reading 2–1 ahead. In the 107th minute, substitute Tony Rougier was credited with an own goal after a clearance from Barry Hunter deflected off him into the Reading goal. Two minutes later, Ian Brightwell passed to Darren Byfield who turned and scored with a low shot which beat Phil Whitehead in the Reading goal. The match ended 3–2 and Walsall were promoted to the First Division.

Walsall ended the following season in 18th place in the First Division table, four places and two points above the relegation zone, securing safety with three wins in their last four games. Reading's next season saw them gain automatic promotion to the First Division after finishing in second place.

== Route to the final ==
Football League Second Division final table, leading positions
Pos	Team	Pld	W	D	L	GF	GA	GD	Pts
1	Millwall	46	28	9	9	89	38	+51	93
2	Rotherham United	46	27	10	9	79	55	+24	91
3	Reading	46	25	11	10	86	52	+34	86
4	Walsall	46	23	12	11	79	50	+29	81
5	Stoke City	46	21	14	11	74	49	+25	77
6	Wigan Athletic	46	19	18	9	53	42	+11	75

Reading finished the regular 2000–01 season in third place in the Second Division, the third tier of the English football league system, one place ahead of Walsall. Both therefore missed out on the two automatic places for promotion to the First Division and instead took part in the play-offs to determine the third promoted team. Reading finished five points behind Rotherham United (who were promoted in second place) and seven behind league winners Millwall. Walsall ended the season five points behind Reading.

Walsall faced Stoke City in their play-off semi-final with the first match of the two-legged tie taking place at the Britannia Stadium on 13 May 2001. Both sides had numerous chances to score, with Walsall's Don Goodman missing at least three opportunities. Stoke substitute Ben Petty who had come on as a substitute for Stoke was sent off in the 84th minute for a foul on Pedro Matías, and the game ended goalless. The second leg of the semi-final was played three days later at the Bescot Stadium in Walsall. In the 31st minute, Stoke's Graham Kavanagh scored with a volley from a Ríkharður Daðason header. Tom Bennett's inswinging corner was fumbled by Gavin Ward, the Stoke goalkeeper, and ended in the goal to level the scores. Two minutes after half time, Matías put Walsall ahead and three minutes later, a free kick from Dean Keates eluded Ward to make it 3–1. Matías scored his second of the match before a consolation goal from Peter Thorne ended the match 4–2 and Walsall progressed to the final.

Reading's opposition for their play-off semi-final was Wigan Athletic and the first leg was played at the JJB Stadium in Wigan on 13 May 2001. Andy Liddell missed a number of chances for the home side before Roy Carroll saved headers from Reading's Barry Hunter and Phil Parkinson within the space of a minute; the match ended 0–0. The second leg of the semi-final took place at the Madejski Stadium in Reading three days later. Kevin Nicholls put Wigan ahead midway through the first half with a shot from 20 yards (18 m) after being set up by Scott Green. Their side held the lead until the 86th minute when Martin Butler scored from close range after Carroll had deflected Nicky Forster's cross. In the last minute of the game, Forster was awarded a penalty after being fouled by Kevin Sharp. Jamie Cureton took the spot kick but his shot was saved by Carroll, and Forster scored, to make it 2–1 and ensured Reading qualified for the final.

== Match ==
=== Background ===
Reading had played in the third tier of English football since they were relegated from the First Division in the 1997–98 season. They had featured in a play-off final on one previous occasion when they lost 4–3 to Bolton Wanderers in the 1995 Football League First Division play-off final. Walsall had been relegated to the Second Division the previous season. They had also played in one play-off final, winning the 1988 Football League Third Division play-off final against Bristol City after a replay. Reading's top scorers during the regular season were Cureton with 28 goals (26 in the league, 1 in the FA Cup and 1 in the League Cup) and Butler with 26 (24 in the league and 2 in the FA Cup). For Walsall, Leitão had scored 21 (18 in the league, 1 in the FA Cup and 2 in the League Cup) while Angell had 13 (12 in the league and 1 in the FA Cup). During the regular season meetings between the sides, Walsall won the game at the Bescot Stadium 2–1 in November 2000 while the clubs played out a 2–2 draw at the Madejski Stadium the following April.

According to Martin Thorpe writing in The Guardian, Walsall had spent £185,000 on players compared to £3.1 million by Reading. The referee for the match was Eddie Wolstenholme. Both teams adopted a 4–4–2 formation. As a result of the redevelopment of Wembley Stadium, it was the first time the English Football League play-offs had taken place at the Millennium Stadium in Cardiff, Wales.

=== Summary ===
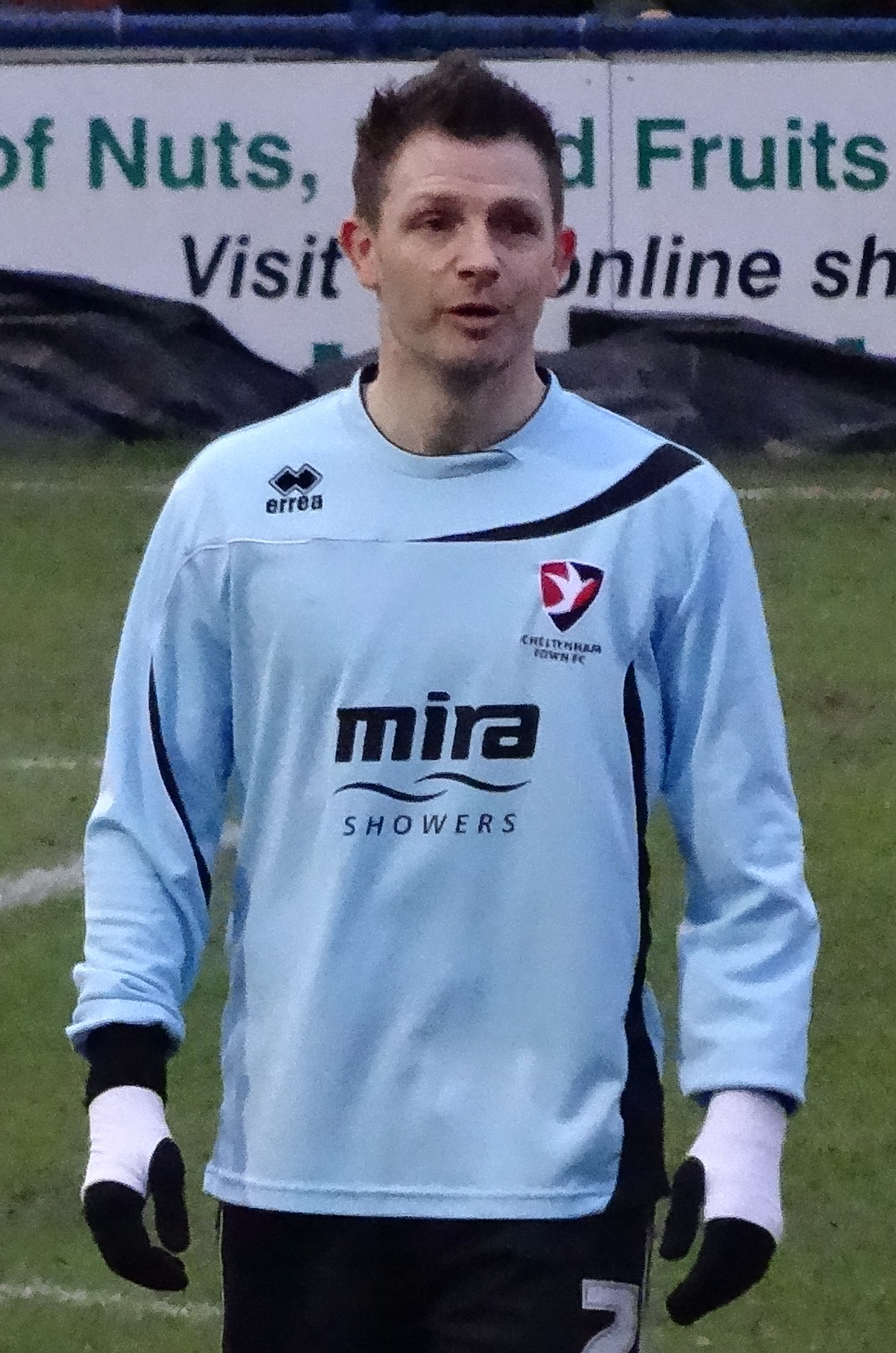
Jamie Cureton (pictured in 2014) scored the opening goal of the final for Reading.

The match kicked off around 3 p.m. on 27 May 2001 in front of a crowd of 50,496. The game was goalless for the first half-hour and then Reading took the lead through Cureton. James Harper crossed the ball into Walsall's six-yard area, and it was headed on by Jim McIntyre. It fell to Cureton 8 yards (7.3 m) out and he volleyed it straight at Jimmy Walker in the Walsall goal. Walker parried the ball but it rolled into the goal to make it 1–0. Soon after, McIntyre's header from Sammy Igoe's cross hit the Walsall crossbar with Walker beaten. The half ended with the score 1–0 to Reading. No personnel changes were made by either side during the interval. In the 45th minute, Walsall's Tony Barras was shown the first yellow card of the match.

Three minutes into the second half, Walsall levelled the game. Matías' cross was headed back across goal by Andy Tillson and Goodman sidefooted it into the Reading goal. In the 65th minute, Reading made their first substitution of the game with Igoe being replaced by Forster. Sixteen minutes later Tony Rougier came on in place of Reading's McIntyre. With five minutes of regular time remaining, Parkinson became the first Reading player to be booked. With the score 1–1 after 90 minutes, the match went into extra time.

Less than a minute into the first half of extra time, Butler's header from a Harper throw-in found the back of the Walsall net to put Reading 2–1 ahead. Midway through the half, Walsall made a triple substitution, Paul Hall, Leitão and Bennett being replaced by Matt Gadsby, Darren Byfield and Gábor Bukrán respectively. In the 107th minute, Rougier was credited with an own goal after a clearance from Hunter deflected off him into the Reading goal. Two minutes later, Ian Brightwell passed to Byfield who was 25 yards (23 m) away from goal. He turned and advanced on goal, and struck a low shot which beat Phil Whitehead in the Reading goal. The match ended 3–2 and Walsall were promoted to the First Division.

=== Details ===
27 May 2001
15:00 BST

Walsall	3–2	Reading
Goodman 48'; Rougier 107' (o.g.); Byfield 109'	Report	Cureton 31'; Butler 91'

Millennium Stadium, Cardiff
Attendance: 50,496

Walsall	Reading

GK	1	Jimmy Walker
DF	3	Ian Brightwell
DF	15	Zigor Aranalde
DF	25	Tony Barras	(yellow card) 45'
DF	5	Andy Tillson
MF	10	Dean Keates
MF	27	Pedro Matías
MF	4	Tom Bennett		(substituted off) 98'
MF	19	Paul Hall		(substituted off) 98'
FW	9	Don Goodman
FW	14	Jorge Leitão		(substituted off) 98'
Substitutes:
GK	17	Carl Emberson
DF	21	Matt Gadsby		(substituted on) 98'
FW	8	Darren Byfield		(substituted on) 98'
FW	11	Brett Angell
MF	26	Gábor Bukrán		(substituted on) 98'
Manager:
Ray Graydon

GK	1	Phil Whitehead
DF	7	Graeme Murty
DF	3	Matthew Robinson
DF	5	Adi Viveash	(yellow card) 120'
DF	29	Ady Williams		(substituted off) 105'
MF	40	James Harper
MF	14	Sammy Igoe		(substituted off) 65'
MF	16	Phil Parkinson	(yellow card) 85'
FW	22	Jim McIntyre		(substituted off) 81'
FW	9	Martin Butler
FW	12	Jamie Cureton
Substitutes:
GK	21	Scott Howie
DF	6	Barry Hunter		(substituted on) 105'
MF	8	Darren Caskey
MF	37	Tony Rougier		(substituted on) 81'
FW	10	Nicky Forster		(substituted on) 65'
Manager:
Alan Pardew

== Post-match ==
The Walsall manager Ray Graydon said: "it was not a classic game but it was a fantastic day." His opposite number Alan Pardew suggested his team should "come through it stronger". Graydon left Walsall in January 2002 with the club in 22nd place in the First Division table. The club's owner Jeff Bonser described the victory at the Millennium Stadium as the greatest day in the history of Walsall F.C.

Walsall ended the following season in 18th place in the First Division table, four places and two points above the relegation zone, securing safety with three wins in their last four games of the season. Reading's next season saw them gain automatic promotion to the First Division after finishing in second place.
