= 2003–04 Walsall F.C. season =

Walsall
2003–04 season
- Chairman: Jeff Bonser
- Manager: Colin Lee (until 16 April); Paul Merson
- First Division: 22nd (relegated)
- FA Cup: Third round
- League Cup: Second round
- Top goalscorer: Jorge Leitão (7)
- Average home league attendance: 7,853
Home colours

During the 2003–04 season, Walsall participated in the Football League First Division.

== Season summary ==
Walsall started the season strongly with 4–1 wins over local rivals West Bromwich Albion and Nottingham Forest, and on Boxing Day were four points off the play-offs. However, the club's form slumped in 2004, with the club not picking up another league win until March. Manager Colin Lee was sacked on 16 April, though the official reason given was that Lee had contacted Plymouth Argyle regarding their managerial vacancy. Paul Merson was appointed temporary player-manager, assisted by fellow player Simon Osborn. Ultimately, Walsall would be relegated on the last day of the season despite a 3–2 win over Rotherham United: an extra two goals scored during the campaign would have been enough for them to climb above Gillingham to safety. Despite the sorry end to the campaign, Paul Merson was handed a permanent contract as manager.

Defender Paul Ritchie was named as the club's Player of the Season, but returned to Scotland to play for Dundee United at the end of the season.

== Final league table ==
Pos	Team	Pld	W	D	L	GF	GA	GD	Pts	Promotion, qualification or relegation
20	Derby County	46	13	13	20	53	67	−14	52	
21	Gillingham	46	14	9	23	48	67	−19	51	
22	Walsall (R)	46	13	12	21	45	65	−20	51	Relegation to Football League One
23	Bradford City (R)	46	10	6	30	38	69	−31	36	Relegation to Football League One
24	Wimbledon (R)	46	8	5	33	41	89	−48	29	Renamed Milton Keynes Dons in Football League One

Source: Soccerway
Rules for classification: 1) points; 2) goal difference; 3) number of goals scored.
(R) Relegated

== Players ==
=== First-team squad ===
Squad at end of season

Note: Flags indicate national team as defined under FIFA eligibility rules; some limited exceptions apply. Players may hold more than one non-FIFA nationality.

No.	Pos.	Nation	Player
1	GK	ENG	Jimmy Walker
2	DF	ENG	Darren Bazeley
3	DF	ESP	Zigor Aranalde
5	DF	ENG	Matt Carbon
6	DF	ENG	Ian Roper
7	MF	ENG	Simon Osborn
8	MF	AUS	Steve Corica
9	FW	POR	Jorge Leitão
10	FW	ENG	Paul Merson
11	MF	ENG	Darren Wrack
12	MF	ESP	Pedro Matías
15	MF	ENG	Neil Emblen
16	FW	ENG	Gary Birch
17	MF	ENG	Mark Wright

No.	Pos.	Nation	Player
18	MF	ENG	Vinny Samways
19	MF	SCO	Craig Burley
21	MF	ENG	Kris Taylor
22	MF	ENG	Nick Smith
23	FW	ENG	Andy Bishop
24	FW	ENG	Matty Fryatt
25	DF	ENG	Gavin Caines
26	DF	SCO	Paul Ritchie
27	GK	NIR	Aaron Kerr
28	FW	ENG	Jermaine McSporran
30	DF	ENG	Julian Bennett
32	GK	AUS	Andy Petterson
33	MF	IRL	Keith Andrews (on loan from Wolverhampton Wanderers)
34	FW	ENG	Lee Bradbury

=== Left club during season ===
Note: Flags indicate national team as defined under FIFA eligibility rules; some limited exceptions apply. Players may hold more than one non-FIFA nationality.

No.	Pos.	Nation	Player
4	DF	NZL	Danny Hay (to Football Kingz)
14	MF	JAM	Jamie Lawrence (Note: Lawrence was born in Wandsworth, England, but also qualified to represent Jamaica internationally and made his international debut for Jamaica in 2000.) (to Grimsby Town)
19	MF	ENG	Craig Stanley (to Telford United)
20	FW	ENG	Karl Hawley (to Hednesford Town)
28	FW	JAM	Deon Burton (Note: Burton was born in Reading, England, but also qualified to represent Jamaica internationally and made his international debut for Jamaica in September 1997.) (on loan from Portsmouth)
28	DF	ENG	Jamie Vincent (on loan from Portsmouth)

No.	Pos.	Nation	Player
28	FW	SCO	Gary Wales (on loan from Heart of Midlothian)
30	DF	NIR	Chris Baird (on loan from Southampton)
31	GK	ENG	Shaun Allaway (on loan from Leeds United)
32	MF	ENG	Tony Dinning (on loan from Wigan Athletic)
33	MF	ENG	Gary O'Neil (on loan from Portsmouth)
50	MF	ENG	Stefan Oakes (to Notts County)

== Transfers ==
=== In ===
- Paul Merson - Portsmouth
- Simon Osborn - Gillingham, 3 July
- Stefan Oakes - Leicester City, 3 July
- Paul Ritchie - Manchester City, August, free
