= Darren Wrack =

English footballer (born 1976)

Personal information
- Full name: Darren Wrack
- Date of birth: 5 May 1976 (age 50)
- Place of birth: Cleethorpes, England
- Height: 5 ft 9 in (1.75 m)
- Position: Midfielder

Youth career
- Derby County

Senior career*
Years	Team	Apps	(Gls)
1994–1996	Derby County	26	(1)
1996–1998	Grimsby Town	13	(1)
1997	→ Shrewsbury Town (loan)	4	(0)
1998–2008	Walsall	336	(46)
2008–2010	Kettering Town	63	(1)
2010–2011	Stafford Rangers	6	(0)
Total		448	(49)
- * Club domestic league appearances and goals

Darren Wrack (born 5 May 1976) is an English former professional footballer who played as a midfielder. He scored 55 goals from 509 league and cup appearances in a 17-year career in the English Football League and Conference.

Wrack began his career at Derby County in 1994. He helped the club to win promotion out of the First Division in 1995–96, before he was sold to Grimsby Town in July 1996. He never established himself in the Grimsby first-team and had a brief loan spell at Shrewsbury Town before moving on to Walsall in July 1998. He went on to spend ten years with the club, winning promotion out of the Second Division in 1998–99 and out of League Two in 2006–07. He was also voted onto the PFA Team of the Year in 1998–99. He joined Kettering Town in July 2008 after receiving treatment at the Sporting Chance Clinic for a gambling addiction. He joined Stafford Rangers in September 2010 before retiring in January 2011. He later worked as a scout for Brighton & Hove Albion and Port Vale.

== Playing career ==
=== Derby County ===
Wrack began his career as a trainee at Derby County in 1994 and made his debut for the "Rams" under Roy McFarland in the 1994–95 season. Jim Smith led the club to promotion into the Premier League as runners-up of the First Division in 1995–96. Wrack played 31 games during his two seasons at the Baseball Ground.

=== Grimsby Town ===
Wrack returned home to Cleethorpes and signed with his home town club Grimsby Town in July 1996 for a fee of £100,000. He was handed his "Mariners" debut by player-manager Brian Laws on 17 August 1996 when he came on as a 78th-minute replacement for Neil Woods in Town's 3–1 home defeat to Wolverhampton Wanderers. Grimsby were relegated from the First Division at the end of the 1996–97 season with Wrack featuring 11 times, scoring once in a 1–1 away draw with Reading. During the same season Wrack also spent a month on loan at Shrewsbury Town, featuring in five games for Fred Davies's "Shrews". During the 1997–98 season, with the club now under the tenure of Alan Buckley, Wrack failed to make an impact in the first-team with the likes of Kevin Donovan, Tommy Widdrington and Paul Groves favoured over Wrack. Wrack would only feature twice for Grimsby under Buckley this season, a Football League Trophy victory over Hull City and a league defeat to Northampton Town. Grimsby earned promotion back to the First Division via the play-offs as well as winning the Football League Trophy in a Wembley double, however, Wrack did not feature in either occasion. Speaking in 2006, Wrack stated that he felt he was "never given the chance to shine" at Blundell Park.

=== Walsall ===
Wrack was signed by Walsall manager Ray Graydon on a free transfer in July 1998. He was voted onto the PFA Team of the Year as the "Saddlers" secured promotion out of the Second Division in the 1998–99 season after finishing in second place behind runaway leaders Fulham. He played 50 games during the 1999–2000 season as Walsall were immediately relegated back into the Second Division. Walsall achieved promotion via the play-offs at the end of the 2000–01 campaign. Still, Wrack was not included in the matchday squad for the play-off final victory over Reading. He signed a new one-year contract in July 2002. He scored seven goals from 50 games in the 2002–03 season, and manager Colin Lee praised Wrack's versatility and willingness to play out of position. He signed a new two-year contract in June 2003. He was limited to 29 appearances during the 2003–04 season due to injury problems as Walsall suffered relegation.

He scored seven goals in 43 League One games during the 2004–05 season. He signed a new contract in June 2005, which resulted in a pay cut but guaranteed him a testimonial match; manager Paul Merson said: "this is a real boost to us because when he's fit his name is first on the team sheet". Wrack broke his leg following a challenge by Colin Miles during a 2–1 defeat to Yeovil Town in September 2005. It took him 13 months to return to full fitness, during which time Walsall were relegated. He marked his return to action with a last-minute goal in a 1–1 draw with Swansea City in a Football League Trophy tie on 17 October 2006. However, he pulled his hamstring during a 1–0 win over Hereford United on 18 November, which was only his second league start in a year. New manager Richard Money led the club to the League Two title in the 2006–07 season. Wrack was given a testimonial match against Wolverhampton Wanderers at the Bescot Stadium in April 2008, which attracted only 1,330 supporters. Both Wrack and long-time teammate Ian Roper were released by the club the following month; this was despite Wrack playing 44 games during the 2007–08 season.

=== Later career ===
Wrack joined Mark Cooper's Kettering Town in July 2008. He made 41 appearances across the 2008–09 campaign. The "Poppies" reached the second round of the FA Cup in the 2009–10 season, and took Leeds United to a replay at Elland Road. He was given a one-year contract extension by manager Lee Harper in May 2010. However, Wrack left Rockingham Road in September 2010 and joined Conference North side Stafford Rangers. He was sent off in manager Tim Flowers's first game in charge and the resulting three-game suspension and a series of call-offs due to the weather limited his appearances at Marston Road. He announced his retirement from the game in January 2011.

== Scouting career ==
Wrack joined Brighton & Hove Albion as a scout in April 2012. He assisted Port Vale caretaker manager Michael Brown with scouting in January 2017, and was confirmed as the club's chief scout four months later He left his post when Neil Aspin replaced Brown as manager on 4 October 2017. He went on to work for a football agency firm.

== Personal life ==
Wrack lost over £500,000 due to a gambling addiction and, in June 2008, received treatment at the Sporting Chance Clinic in Hampshire after becoming suicidal. He said that "I was living in a dream world. It's a sad fact that gambling took everything from me." He married Lisa and the couple had a daughter, Macey, born in 2009.

== Career statistics ==
Appearances and goals by club, season and competition
Club	Season	League			FA Cup		Other		Total	
Club	Season	Division	Apps	Goals	Apps	Goals	Apps	Goals	Apps	Goals
Derby County	1994–95	First Division	16	1	1	0	0	0	17	1
Derby County	1995–96	First Division	10	0	1	0	3	0	14	0
Derby County	Total		26	1	2	0	3	0	31	1
Grimsby Town	1996–97	First Division	12	1	0	0	0	0	12	1
Grimsby Town	1997–98	Second Division	1	0	0	0	1	0	2	0
Grimsby Town	Total		13	1	0	0	1	0	14	1
Shrewsbury Town (loan)	1996–97	Second Division	4	0	0	0	1	0	5	0
Walsall	1998–99	Second Division	46	13	2	0	8	1	56	14
Walsall	1999–2000	First Division	44	4	2	0	4	0	50	4
Walsall	2000–01	Second Division	28	4	2	1	3	0	33	5
Walsall	2001–02	First Division	43	4	3	0	2	1	48	5
Walsall	2002–03	First Division	43	6	4	1	3	0	50	7
Walsall	2003–04	First Division	27	6	1	0	1	0	29	6
Walsall	2004–05	League One	43	7	1	1	3	0	47	8
Walsall	2005–06	League One	7	0	0	0	0	0	7	0
Walsall	2006–07	League Two	18	1	1	0	1	1	20	2
Walsall	2007–08	League One	37	1	5	0	2	0	44	1
Walsall	Total		336	46	21	3	27	3	384	52
Kettering Town	2008–09	Conference Premier	36	0	5	0	0	0	41	0
Kettering Town	2009–10	Conference Premier	27	1	1	0	0	0	28	1
Kettering Town	2010–11	Conference Premier	0	0	0	0	0	0	0	0
Kettering Town	Total		63	1	6	0	0	0	69	1
Stafford Rangers	2010–11	Conference North	6	0	0	0	0	0	6	0
Career total			448	49	29	3	32	3	509	55

== Honours ==
Derby County

- Football League First Division second-place promotion: 1995–96

Walsall

- Football League Second Division second-place promotion: 1998–99
- Football League Two: 2006–07

Individual

- PFA Team of the Year: 1998–99 Second Division
