= Garrocho =

Garrocho may refer to:

- Garrocho family, Spanish family
- Garrocho (surname), Spanish surname
- Native name of Viburnum triphyllum, a plant
- Native name of Quararibea asterolepis, a tree
- Native name of Quararibea turbinata, a tree
