= Thomas Thøgersen =

Danish footballer (born 1968)

Personal information
- Full name: Thomas Thøgersen
- Date of birth: 2 April 1968 (age 58)
- Place of birth: Copenhagen, Denmark
- Positions: Full back; midfielder; forward

Youth career
- AIK Frederiksholm,
- Frem, KHB

Senior career*
| Years | Team | Apps | (Gls) |
| 1988–1993 | Frem | 85 | (10) |
| 1993–1998 | Brondby | 163 | (22) |
| 1998–2002 | Portsmouth | 108 | (8) |
| 2001 | → Walsall (loan) | 7 | (2) |
| 2002 | Frem | 14 | (3) |
- * Club domestic league appearances and goals

Thomas Thøgersen (born 2 April 1968) is a Danish former professional footballer who won three Danish football championships with Brondby.

Thøgersen was born in Copenhagen. He made his senior debut with Frem in 1989, but left the club when they were relegated in 1993. He moved to Brondby in the top-flight Danish Superliga championship, and helped the club win the 1994 Danish Cup trophy from his position as forward. From 1996 to 1998, he was a part of the Brøndby team which won three Superliga titles in a row. In 1998, he moved abroad to play for English club Portsmouth in the second-tier Football League First Division. Initially playing as a defender, he was eventually moved into the attacking midfielder position. He played a total of 119 games for Portsmouth until 2002, when he returned to end his career with childhood club Frem.

== Honours ==
- Danish Cup: 1994
- Danish Superliga: 1996, 1997 and 1998
