= Ken Hodgkisson =

English footballer (1933–2018)

Personal information
- Full name: William Kenneth Hodgkisson
- Date of birth: 12 March 1933
- Place of birth: West Bromwich, England
- Date of death: 10 May 2018 (aged 85)
- Position: Inside forward

Senior career*
Years	Team	Apps	(Gls)
1950–1955	West Bromwich Albion	21	(4)
1955–1966	Walsall	336	(58)
1966–1967	Worcester City		
1967–1968	Dudley Town		

Managerial career
- 1968–1971: Dudley Town
- * Club domestic league appearances and goals

William Kenneth Hodgkisson (12 March 1933 – 10 May 2018) was an English professional footballer who played as an inside forward. He began his career with West Bromwich Albion, making his professional debut in 1953 before being sold to Walsall in 1956. He went on to make over 350 appearances for the club during an eleven-year spell, winning promotion on two occasions. He later played non-league football with Worcester City and Dudley Town, where he also spent three years as manager.

== Career ==
Born in West Bromwich, Hodgkisson attended George Salter Academy. He began his career with his hometown club West Bromwich Albion as an amateur, signing his first professional contract in April 1950. He made his senior debut three years later, in April 1953 during a match against Aston Villa and scored three times in five appearances at the end of the season. However, he struggled to establish himself in the first team, making twenty league appearances during six years at the club.

In December 1955, he joined Walsall for a fee of £1,600. He quickly formed a forward partnership with Tony Richards and the pair were instrumental in helping the club win the Fourth Division title during the 1959–60 season and achieve a second promotion to the Second Division the following year. In August 1965, Hodgkisson became the first Walsall player to be used as a substitute when he came on during a match against Workington. Having made over 350 appearances in all competitions during eleven years, he left the club in 1966 to join Worcester City. He joined Dudley Town the following year, taking over as manager of the side in 1968 before leaving in 1971.

In 1975, Hodgkisson returned to West Bromwich Albion as a coach. He was appointed youth team manager in 1981, remaining in the role until 1985. He later worked as a scout for Derby County.

== Death ==
Hodgkisson died on 10 May 2018 at the age of 85 and was survived by a wife and three daughters.

== Honours ==
Walsall

- Football League Fourth Division: 1959–60
