= Bjarni Lárusson =

Icelandic footballer

Bjarnólfur Lárusson
Personal information
- Full name: Bjarnólfur Lárusson
- Date of birth: 11 March 1976 (age 50)
- Place of birth: Vestmannaeyjar, Iceland
- Height: 1.86 m (6 ft 1 in)
- Position: Midfielder

Senior career*
Years	Team	Apps	(Gls)
1994–1997	ÍBV	63	(13)
1997–1998	Hibernian	7	(1)
1998–2000	Walsall	59	(3)
2000–2001	Scunthorpe United	33	(4)
2001–2005	ÍBV	63	(12)
2005–2008	KR	43	(2)
2008–2009	ÍBV	6	(0)
Total		274	(35)

International career
1991	Iceland U17	7	(0)
1993–1994	Iceland U19	11	(5)
1996–1997	Iceland U21	10	(3)

Managerial career
- 2011: Víkingur
- * Club domestic league appearances and goals

Bjarnólfur "Bjarni" Lárusson (born 11 March 1976) is an Icelandic former professional footballer who played as a midfielder for Walsall and Scunthorpe United in the English Football League.

He also played for Hibernian in the Scottish Premier League, where he scored once against Kilmarnock.
