= Colin Harrison (footballer) =

English footballer

Personal information
- Date of birth: 18 March 1946 (age 80)
- Place of birth: Pelsall, England
- Position: Defender

Youth career
- Walsall

Senior career*
Years	Team	Apps	(Gls)
1964–1982	Walsall	473	(33)
1982–1983	Rushall Olympic		
- * Club domestic league appearances and goals

Colin Harrison (born 18 March 1946) is an English former professional footballer who played as a full back. He spent his entire professional career at Walsall where he holds the record for the most Football League appearances made by any one player at the club, making 473 league appearances across 18 years.

== Career ==
A product of the Walsall youth system, he signed for the club on amateur terms in June 1961 before turning professional on 13 November 1963. His league debut came in September 1964 against Southend United and in his early days at the club he was employed as a utility player before settling into the role of full back. He established himself as first choice in that position for a number of years until suffering an injury in 1979 which saw him miss all but three of the league games in the 1979–80 season. He returned for 19 league appearances the following season and made his final appearance in a game against Chesterfield in September 1981.

Towards the end of his time at Walsall, Harrison also acted as trainer of the reserve team. Harrison made in total either 467 or 473 league appearances depending on the source consulted. He left the club in 1982 and signed for local non-league side Rushall Olympic in August 1982 before leaving the club and retiring in early 1983.

Harrison also held the record for most Walsall appearances in all competitions until this was overhauled by Jimmy Walker in January 2012.
