= Garrucho =

Garrocho is a Spanish surname. Notable people with the surname include:

- Joseph Garrucho, 18th-century Jesuit missionary
- Vicente Salgado y Garrucho, Filipino Roman Catholic bishop

== See also ==
- Garruchos
- Garrocho
