= Frédéric Biancalani =

French footballer (born 1974)

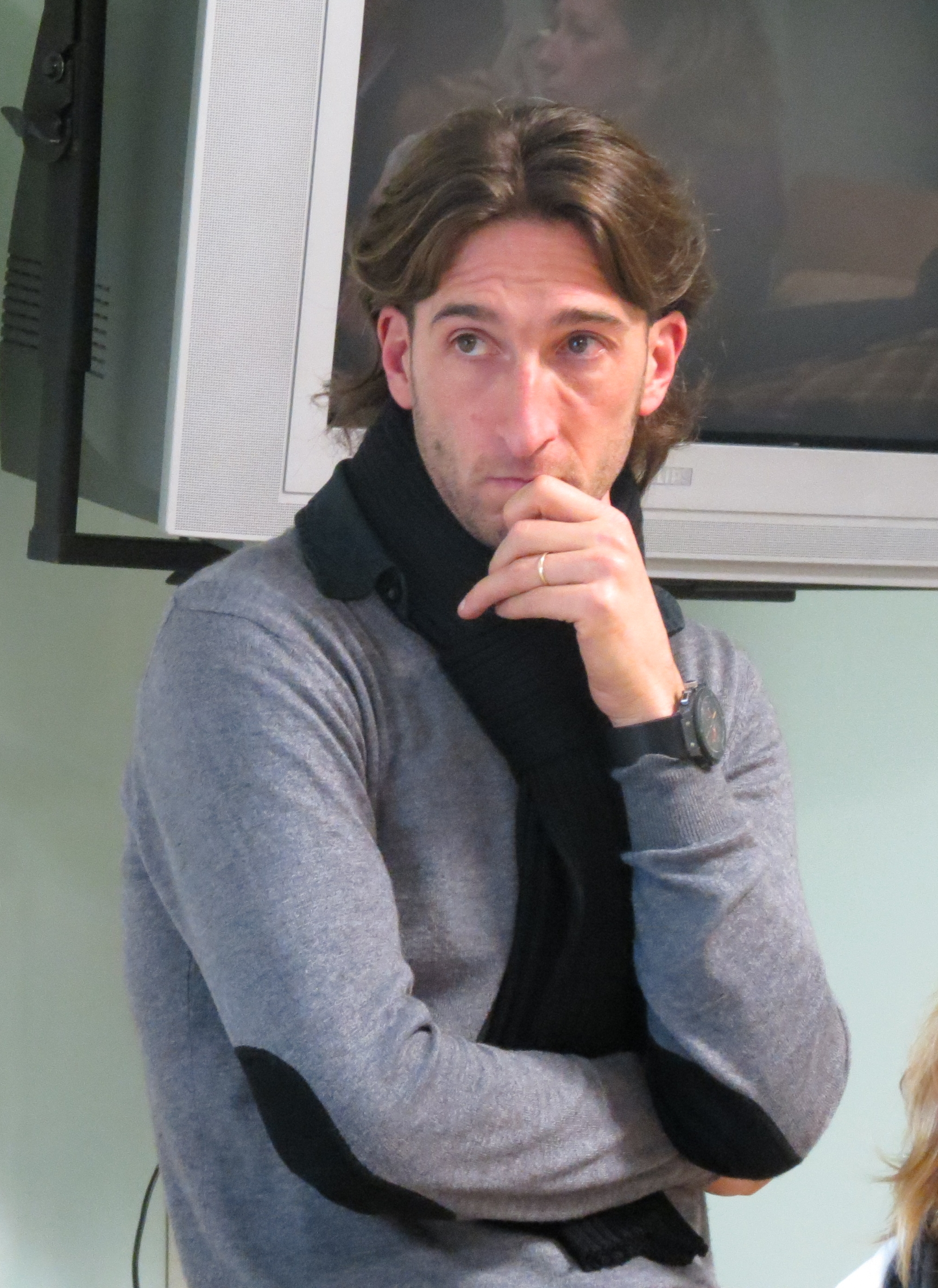
- Biancalani in November 2012

Personal information
- Full name: Frédéric Biancalani
- Date of birth: 21 July 1974 (age 52)
- Place of birth: Villerupt, France
- Height: 1.82 m (6 ft 0 in)
- Position: Defender

Senior career*
Years	Team	Apps	(Gls)
1994–2001	Nancy	185	(7)
2001–2002	Walsall	18	(2)
2002–2009	Nancy	175	(3)
2009–2010	Metz	18	(0)
2010–2011	Reims	19	(0)
Total		415	(12)
- * Club domestic league appearances and goals

Frédéric Biancalani (born 21 July 1974) is a French former professional footballer who played as a defender.

== Career ==
Biancalani was born in Villerupt, France. He came from the youth academy at Nancy and played his first professional match in August 1996 against Paris Saint-Germain. The result was 0–0. In 2001, Biancalani moved to Walsall, when they were in the old First Division. He played 15 games, making six substitutes appearances, scoring twice and receiving three yellow cards and one red card. In 2002, he returned to Nancy. On 6 August 2009, Metz announced the signing of Biancalani on a free transfer after seven years with Nancy.

== Honours ==
Nancy

- Coupe de la Ligue: 2005–06
