= Garrocho (surname) =

Garrocho is a Spanish surname associated with the Garrocho family that originates from Huelva, Spain. Notable people with the surname include:

- Carlos Garrocho, Angolan soccer player
- Thiago Garrocho (born 1987), Brazilian politician

== See also ==
- Garrucho
- Jarocho
