= Garruchos =

Garruchos may refer to two places in South America:

- Garruchos, Corrientes, a municipality in the Santo Tomé Department of province of Corrientes, Argentina
- Garruchos, Rio Grande do Sul, a municipality in the western part of the state of Rio Grande do Sul in Brasil

== See also ==
- Garrucho
