= Union Namur =

Belgian football club

- Full name: Union Royale Namur
- Nickname: Les Merles (The Blackbirds)
- Short name: U.R.N.
- Founded: 1905; 121 years ago
- Ground: Stade ADEPS de Jambes
- Capacity: 2,500
- Chairman: Bernard Annet
- Manager: Gabor Bukran
- League: Division 2 (D2 FFA) (4th national level)
- 2025–26: 12th of 12
- Website: www.unionnamur.be
| Home colours | Away colours |

Union Namur, formerly known as Union Royale Namur, is a Belgian football club based in Namur, capital of Namur Province. The team currently play in the National Division 2, the fourth tier of Belgian football. They are often nicknamed Les Merles due to their colours black with a touch of yellow.

== History ==
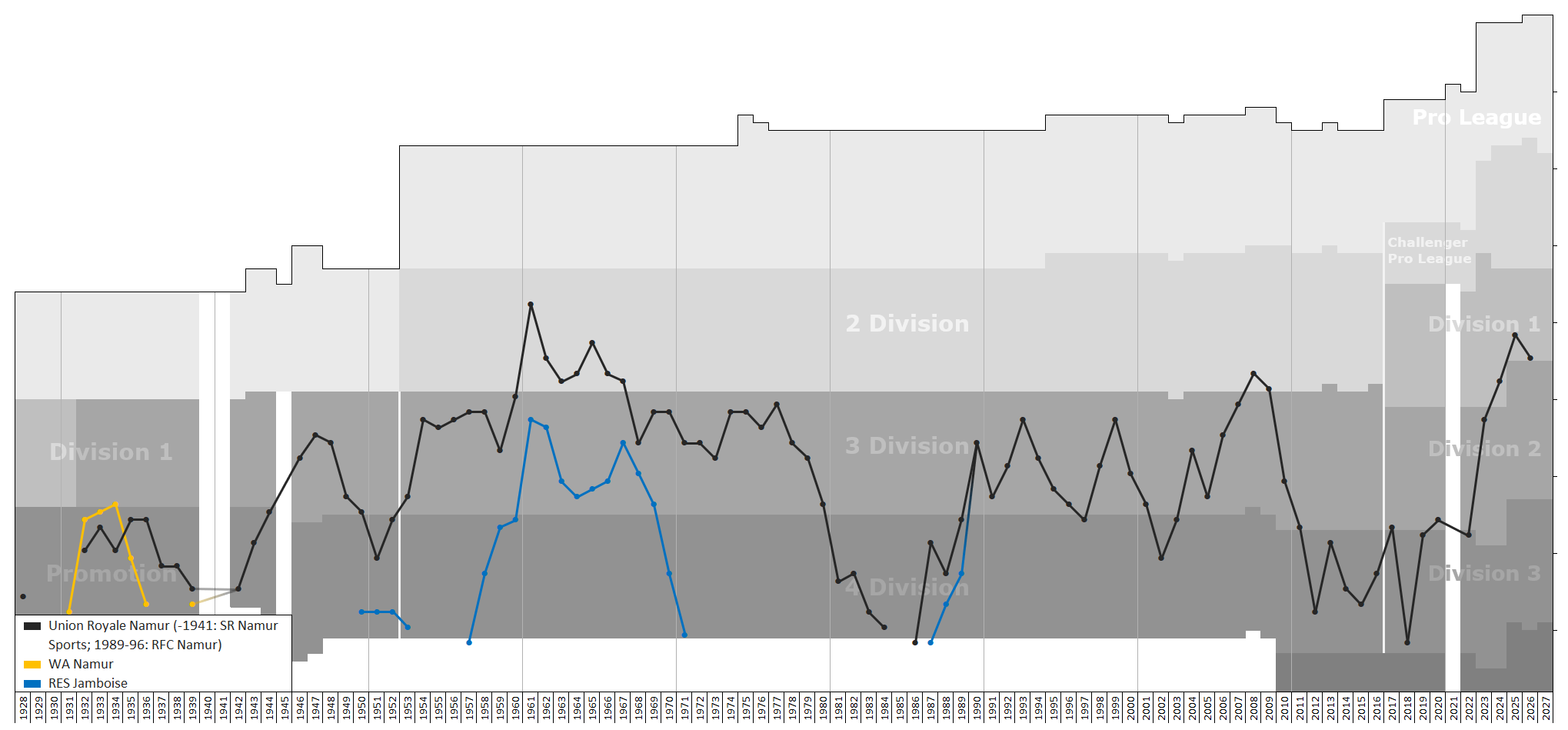
Historical chart of Union Namur league performance

The club was founded in 1905. Until 2018, the team was known as UR Namur, however as the team faced relegation from the 2017–18 Belgian Third Amateur Division into the Belgian provincial leagues, the team instead merged with newly promoted Fosses to form Union Royale Namur Fosses-La-Ville and retain its place in the Belgian Third Amateur Division.

In 2021–22, the club renamed to Union Namur promotes to the Second Amateur Division (4th tier of Belgian football).

In 2022–23, Union Namur secure promotion to Belgian National Division 1 from 2023–24 season, after finishing runner-up due to RFC Warnant finishing as Champions of Belgian Division 2 ACFF cause fail obtain a licence to Belgian third tier.

== Stadium ==
Union Namur play in Stade Communal de Namur (En: City of Namur Stadium) with a capacity 3,500 seats (700 seats).

== Current squad ==
As of 5 February, 2026

Note: Flags indicate national team as defined under FIFA eligibility rules; some limited exceptions apply. Players may hold more than one non-FIFA nationality.

| No. | Pos. | Nation | Player |
|---|---|---|---|
| 2 | DF | BEL | Jordan Kerstenne |
| 4 | DF | BEL | Jérémie Mugabo |
| 6 | MF | BEL | Amaury Patris |
| 7 | FW | BEL | Paolino Bertaccini |
| 8 | MF | COL | Carlos Uhía |
| 10 | FW | BEL | Dieudonné Lwangi |
| 11 | FW | GUI | Oumar Traoré |
| 12 | DF | BEL | Abdoul Botaka |
| 13 | DF | BEL | Adel Sbaa |
| 14 | FW | BEL | Eli Honnof |
| 17 | FW | COD | José Musset Quintais |
| 18 | DF | FRA | David Perreira-Bofomua |
| 19 | MF | BEL | David Nobrega |

| No. | Pos. | Nation | Player |
|---|---|---|---|
| 21 | FW | BEL | Jules Foll |
| 23 | MF | CGO | Yannick Loemba |
| 25 | FW | FRA | Mamoudou Koumé |
| 27 | GK | BEL | Clément Libertiaux |
| 29 | FW | BEL | Yanis Lahrach |
| 33 | MF | BEL | Lukas Bokota |
| 34 | FW | BEL | Walid Aabdi |
| 36 | DF | BEL | Luca Chavet |
| 45 | DF | FRA | Yanis Afkir |
| 54 | DF | BEL | Tom Adant |
| 77 | FW | BEL | Noé Pierot |
| 94 | MF | BEL | Marlon Vandekerkhove |
| 99 | GK | CMR | Herwell Tsague |

=== Retired numbers ===
3 – (Belgium) Michel Soulier, defender (1967–77)

== Staff ==
Head Coach (Hungary) Gabor Bukran

Assistant Coach

Goalkeeper Coach

== Honours ==
- Belgian Division 4
  - Runners-up (1): 2022–23
