= Gábor Bukrán =

Hungarian footballer (born 1975)

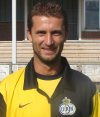

Personal information
- Full name: Gábor Bukrán
- Date of birth: 16 November 1975 (age 50)
- Place of birth: Eger, Hungary
- Height: 1.83 m (6 ft 0 in)
- Position: Midfielder

Senior career*
Years	Team	Apps	(Gls)
1992–1993	Budapest Honvéd	0	(0)
1993–1997	Charleroi	63	(1)
1997–1998	Córdoba	29	(3)
1998–1999	Xerez	18	(2)
1999–2001	Walsall	73	(4)
2001	Wigan Athletic	1	(0)
2001–2003	SV Salzburg	14	(0)
2003–2005	Royal Antwerp	20	(1)
2005–2010	Union Royale Namur	124	(8)
2010–2012	R. JS Heppignies-Lambusart-Fleurus	16	(0)
2012–2015	R.C.S. Onhaye		

International career
1996–1997	Hungary U21	2	(0)
2000	Hungary	1	(0)
- * Club domestic league appearances and goals

Gábor Bukrán (born 16 November 1975) is a Hungarian former professional footballer who played as a midfielder. He played club football in Hungary, Belgium, Spain, England and Austria. He made a single appearance for Hungary in 2000.

== Early life ==
Bukrán was born in Eger.

== Club career ==
He began his career in 1992 with Budapest Honvéd before moving to Belgian First Division side Charleroi in 1993. Bukrán helped Charleroi to a fourth-place finish in 1993–94 and qualification for European competition in three out of his four years in Belgium.

In 1997, he moved to Spain to play for Córdoba in the Segunda División B. After only one season, he moved to Xerez, who also played in Segunda División B. In his two years in Spain, Bukrán played 47 league games and scored five goals.

In the summer of 1999, Bukrán came to the attention of English side Walsall and, on 5 August 1999, he signed a two-year contract with the newly promoted First Division side. He quickly became a fans' favourite but could not prevent the team's relegation on the final day of the season. The 2000–01 season was a much happier one as Bukrán helped Walsall to promotion back to the First Division via the Second Division play-off final, beating Reading 3–2 at Cardiff's Millennium Stadium.

Bukrán left Walsall having made 73 appearances in the league for the club. He then played for Wigan Athletic, signing on a non-contract basis for the club. Bukrán scored Wigan's only goal in a 6–1 pre-season friendly loss against Everton. He had a shot on target in the opening league match of the season, although he didn't score, in a 1–1 draw with Brentford, subsequently leaving the club without signing a contract.

Bukrán later played for Austrian side SV Salzburg, where he spent two years. He then returned to Belgium with Royal Antwerp in 2003. He played out the remainder of his career in Belgium with Union Royale Namur, R. JS Heppignies and R.C.S. Onhaye.

== International career ==
Bukrán made his international debut for Hungary in a 3–0 friendly defeat to Australia in February 2000. Despite being selected in the squad for the majority of Hungary's Euro 2000 Qualifying campaign, his debut turned out to be his first and last international appearance.

== Honours ==
Walsall

- Football League Second Division play-offs: 2001
