= Carlos Garrocho =

Angolan soccer player (born 1974)

Personal information
- Full name: Carlos Miguel dos Santos Franco Garrocho
- Date of birth: 26 January 1974 (age 52)
- Place of birth: Benguela, Angola
- Positions: Midfielder; winger; forward

Youth career
- –1993: Real

Senior career*
Years	Team	Apps	(Gls)
1993–2000	Arrifanense		(15+)
2000	Feirense	16	(3)
2000	Leça	9	(0)
2001	Feirense	13	(5)
2001–2002	Walsall	4	(0)
2002–2004	Lusitânia	39	(18)
2004–2005	Famalicão		
2005–2006	Tirsense		

International career
2002	Angola	1	(0)
- * Club domestic league appearances and goals

Carlos Miguel dos Santos Franco Garrocho (born 26 January 1974) is an Angolan retired footballer who played as a midfielder, winger, and attacker. Spending nearly his entire career in Portugal, Garrocho earned one cap for the Angola national team in 2002.

== Career ==
Garrocho started his career with Arrifanense. In 2001, he signed for Walsall in the English Football League First Division, where he made five appearances and scored zero goals. After that, he played for Portuguese clubs Lusitânia and Famalicão before retiring.
