= Dean Keates =

English footballer

Personal information
- Full name: Dean Scott Keates
- Date of birth: 30 June 1978 (age 48)
- Place of birth: Walsall, England
- Height: 5 ft 6 in (1.68 m)
- Position: Midfielder

Senior career*
Years	Team	Apps	(Gls)
1995–2002	Walsall	162	(10)
2002–2004	Hull City	50	(4)
2004–2005	Kidderminster Harriers	49	(7)
2005–2006	Lincoln City	21	(4)
2006–2007	Walsall	53	(15)
2007–2009	Peterborough United	84	(11)
2010	Wycombe Wanderers	13	(1)
2010–2015	Wrexham	160	(13)
2015–2016	Rhyl	22	(1)
2016	Rushall Olympic	7	(0)
Total		621	(66)

Managerial career
- 2016–2018: Wrexham
- 2018–2019: Walsall
- 2019–2021: Wrexham
- * Club domestic league appearances and goals

Dean Scott Keates (born 30 June 1978) is an English professional football manager and former player who was most recently the manager of Wrexham.

During his playing career, Keates played as a midfielder, making his professional debut for hometown club Walsall in 1996. He won promotion six times with three of his clubs – three times with Walsall in 1999, 2001 and 2007, once with Hull City in 2004 and twice with Peterborough United in 2008 and 2009.

== Playing career ==
=== Walsall ===
Keates came through the ranks at his hometown club Walsall, making his professional debut as a substitute in a 1–0 loss to Plymouth Argyle on 12 October 1996. He made his first start for the club later that season on 25 January 1997, playing the full game in a 3–1 victory over Notts County. He became a first team regular in the next season as, at the age of 19, he played in 48 games in all competitions. He scored his first goal for the club in a 1–0 win away at Millwall on 3 December 1997. Keates was a key member of the Saddlers' midfield in a successful 1998–99 season, playing in all but three games as Walsall won promotion to First Division as runners-up, ahead of Manchester City. Relegation followed the next year as Walsall struggled to adapt to life at a higher level, though the club immediately won promotion back to Division One with a play-off final victory over Reading at the end of the 2000–01 campaign. Keates played for the full 120 minutes of the game, which ended in a 3–2 win for Walsall after extra time. He played 15 games in the 2001–02 season as Walsall survived in the division, before he was released in July 2002.

=== Hull City ===
Keates moved to Third Division club Hull City, initially on a non-contract basis, in August 2002. By the end of September, Keates' displays had earned him a two-year contract, awarded to him by then-Hull manager Jan Mølby. Despite new chairman Adam Pearson's money being pumped into the club on new players, Keates endured a lukewarm season at Hull, playing in 35 league games as they finished mid-table. The next season, 2003–04, was more fruitful with Hull achieving promotion to the newly named League One as runners-up. Keates, however, played no part in the campaign after December 2003 – a knee injury that kept him sidelined proved his undoing, as he could not force his way back into the team and subsequently left the club before the end of the season.

=== Kidderminster Harriers ===
On 10 February 2004, Third Division club Kidderminster Harriers, now managed by former Hull boss Jan Mølby, signed Keates on a free transfer. He played in eight games as the Harriers avoided relegation back to the Football Conference. Though he played 41 games the next season, Keates and Kidderminster were relegated. He left the club at the end of the season, his contract having expired.

=== Lincoln City ===
On 1 July 2005, Keates signed for League Two club Lincoln City on a one-year deal. He made his Lincoln debut in a 2–1 defeat to Notts County on 13 August 2005 and scored his first goal for the club in a 1–1 draw with Rushden & Diamonds later that month. He went on to play 24 games and score four goals for the Imps.

=== Return to Walsall ===
Keates re-joined former club Walsall on a free transfer on transfer deadline day in January 2006, after his Lincoln contract was cancelled by mutual consent. It was initially an unhappy return for Keates as Walsall were relegated to League Two at the end of the season. Richard Money was appointed as the Saddlers' new manager in May 2006, and under him, Keates was appointed captain. He played a key role in Walsall's promotion as champions back to League One in the 2006–07 season, scoring a career best 13 goals. Keates was named in the PFA League Two Team of the Year for the 2006–07 season, as well as being named Walsall's Player of the Season.

=== Peterborough United ===
Keates was signed by League Two club Peterborough United on a three-year deal on 14 May 2007, having refused the offer of a new contract from Walsall. He played 78 league games, scoring 11 goals, as Peterborough achieved successive promotions to the Championship. Keates was released by Peterborough United on 31 December 2009, having not played a minute of football under new Posh manager Mark Cooper. He managed just 6 games and 1 goal, against Newcastle United at St James Park, in the 2009–10 season before Cooper's arrival.

=== Wycombe Wanderers ===
On 21 January 2010, Keates signed for League One club Wycombe Wanderers on a 6-month contract. He scored his first, and only, goal for the club against Huddersfield Town on 3 April 2010. He was released by Wycombe on 10 May 2010.

=== Wrexham ===
Keates signed for Conference Premier club Wrexham two days after being released by Wycombe. He was named captain for the season, and scored his first goal four games into the season with a 30-yard volley against former club Kidderminster Harriers. In his first season for the club, Keates lead the team to a play-off semi-final against Luton Town but they lost the tie 5–1 on aggregate. In the 2011–12 season Keates played in some major matches, including the FA Cup 3rd round match at Championship club Brighton & Hove Albion. A draw at Brighton's Falmer Stadium meant a replay was to be played at The Racecourse which Wrexham lost 4–5 on penalties, the only missed penalty being the first taken by Keates. There was also déjà vu at the end of the season, as Wrexham fell to another play-off semi-final defeat to Luton Town. Despite the disappointment, Keates signed a new one-year deal at the club at the end of the season. The 2012–13 season was disappointing one in the league as Wrexham missed out on a place in the play-offs, finishing in 10th place. The season was still to end with glory for the Dragons, however, as they reached the 2013 FA Trophy Final and beat Grimsby Town on penalties at Wembley Stadium. After becoming a fans' favourite during his time at the Racecourse, by making 180 appearances in total for the club as captain, he was released in May 2015.

=== Rhyl ===
Following his release by Wrexham, Keates joined the coaching staff at the groundbreaking Glyndŵr Wrexham Football Academy. He joined in order to develop his coaching skills and complete his sports coaching degree at the university. Keates refused to completely hang up his boots, however, and also signed part-time with Welsh Premier League club Rhyl.

=== Rushall Olympic ===
Keates returned to his roots by signing for Walsall-based Northern Premier League side Rushall Olympic in July 2016. He made seven appearances in the league and two in the FA Cup in a short spell for The Pics before leaving the club to take over as Wrexham manager.

== Management career ==
=== Wrexham ===
Keates was appointed as Wrexham's new permanent manager on 25 October 2016 after a brief interim spell in charge after the sacking of Gary Mills. With just nine games of the 2017–18 National League season remaining, Keates left Wrexham for Walsall. Subsequently, Wrexham failed to make the National League play-offs that season.

=== Walsall ===
On 16 March 2018, Keates re-joined hometown club Walsall for a third time, this time as first-team manager. On 6 April 2019, Keates was dismissed as Walsall manager following a 3–1 home defeat to Oxford United. This followed winning just three, drawing three and losing 14 of Keates' last 20 games as manager. The following month Walsall were relegated to League Two.

=== Return to Wrexham ===
Keates was re-appointed as Wrexham's new permanent manager on 6 October 2019 after the sacking of Bryan Hughes. Keates took over with Wrexham in 20th position, one place above the relegation places. On 1 December 2019 the Wrexham A.F.C. board publicly apologised to supporters for poor performances after crisis talks with Keates. This was immediately following a defeat against the then bottom-of-the-table side Ebbsfleet United F.C. Wrexham A.F.C. reached the lowest league position in their 155-year history. Following a 1–1 draw on the final day of the 2020–21 season, Wrexham having missed out on play-offs, Keates' contract was not renewed

== Playing statistics ==
Appearances and goals by club, season and competition
Club	Season	League			FA Cup		League Cup		Other		Total	
Club	Season	Division	Apps	Goals	Apps	Goals	Apps	Goals	Apps	Goals	Apps	Goals
Walsall	1996–97	Second Division	2	0	0	0	0	0	0	0	2	0
Walsall	1997–98	Second Division	33	1	4	0	6	0	5 (Note: Appearance(s) in Football League Trophy)	1	48	2
Walsall	1998–99	Second Division	43	2	2	0	2	0	5	1	52	3
Walsall	1999–2000	First Division	35	1	2	0	4	1	—		41	2
Walsall	2000–01	Second Division	36	5	3	0	3	0	1	0	43	5
Walsall	2001–02	First Division	13	1	3	1	1	0	—		17	1
Walsall	Total		162	10	14	0	16	1	11	2	203	13
Hull City	2002–03	Third Division	36	4	0	0	1	0	0	0	37	4
Hull City	2003–04	Third Division	14	0	0	0	1	0	2	0	17	0
Hull City	Total		50	4	0	0	2	0	2	0	54	4
Kidderminster Harriers	2003–04	Third Division	8	2	0	0	0	0	0	0	8	2
Kidderminster Harriers	2004–05	League Two	41	5	1	0	1	0	1	0	44	5
Kidderminster Harriers	Total		49	7	1	0	1	0	1	0	52	7
Lincoln City	2005–06	League Two	21	4	1	0	2	0	0	0	24	4
Walsall	2005–06	League One	14	2	0	0	0	0	0	0	14	2
Walsall	2006–07	League Two	39	13	2	0	2	0	0	0	43	13
Walsall	Total		53	15	2	0	2	0	0	0	57	15
Peterborough United	2007–08	League Two	40	5	3	0	2	0	0	0	45	5
Peterborough United	2008–09	League One	38	5	5	0	1	0	0	0	44	5
Peterborough United	2009–10	Championship	6	1	0	0	1	0	—		7	1
Peterborough United	Total		84	11	8	0	4	0	0	0	96	11
Wycombe Wanderers	2009–10	League One	13	1	0	0	0	0	0	0	13	1
Wrexham	2010–11	Conference Premier	42	6	0	0	—		0	0	42	6
Wrexham	2011–12	Conference Premier	31	2	2	0	—		0	0	33	2
Wrexham	2012–13	Conference Premier	41	2	1	0	—		7 (Note: Appearance(s) in FA Trophy)	1	49	3
Wrexham	2013–14	Conference Premier	27	2	2	0	—		1	0	30	2
Wrexham	2014–15	Conference Premier	19	1	1	0	—		6	0	26	1
Wrexham	Total		160	13	6	0	—		14	1	180	14
Rhyl	2015–16	Welsh Premier League	22	1	0	0	0	0	0	0	22	1
Rushall Olympic	2016–17	Northern Premier League	7	0	2	0	0	0	0	0	9	0
Career total			621	66	34	0	27	1	42	3	724	70

== Managerial statistics ==
As of match played 29 May 2021

Managerial record by team and tenure
Team	From	To	Record					Ref.
Team	From	To	P	W	D	L	Win %	Ref.
Wrexham	13 October 2016	16 March 2018	73	25	26	22	34.2	
Walsall	16 March 2018	6 April 2019	60	18	13	29	30.0	
Wrexham	6 October 2019	30 May 2021	74	30	18	26	40.5	
Total			207	73	57	77	35.3	

== Honours ==
Walsall

- Football League Second Division second-place promotion: 1998–99; play-offs: 2001
- Football League Two: 2006–07

Hull City

- Football League Third Division second-place promotion: 2003–04

Peterborough United

- Football League One second-place promotion: 2008–09
- Football League Two second-place promotion: 2007–08

Wrexham

- FA Trophy: 2012–13; runner-up: 2014–15

Individual

- PFA Team of the Year: 2006–07 Football League Two
- Walsall Player of the Year: 2006–07
- Conference Premier Team of the Year: 2012–13
