= Matt Gadsby =

English footballer

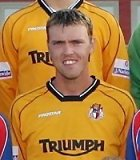
- Gadsby with Hinckley United in 2006

Personal information
- Full name: Matthew John Gadsby
- Date of birth: 6 September 1979
- Place of birth: Sutton Coldfield, England
- Date of death: 9 September 2006 (aged 27)
- Place of death: Harrogate, England
- Position: Defender

Youth career
- 1996–1998: Walsall

Senior career*
Years	Team	Apps	(Gls)
1998–2002	Walsall	37	(0)
2002–2003	Mansfield Town	20	(0)
2003–2004	Kidderminster Harriers	32	(2)
2004–2006	Forest Green Rovers	66	(3)
2006	Hinckley United	7	(1)
Total		162	(6)
- * Club domestic league appearances and goals

Matthew John Gadsby (6 September 1979 – 9 September 2006) was an English professional footballer. Born in Sutton Coldfield, he played for Walsall, Mansfield Town, Kidderminster Harriers, Forest Green and Hinckley United as a defender and midfielder.

== Playing career ==
Born in Sutton Coldfield, Gadsby began his career at Walsall, where he graduated from the youth team. He made his professional debut on 2 May 1998, replacing Adi Viveash for the final nine minutes as they lost 1–0 to Wycombe Wanderers at the Bescot Stadium in the Second Division. On 30 September, he made his first career start, in a 2–0 home defeat against Reading. He was an extra-time substitute on 27 May 2001, when Walsall defeated Reading 3–2 at the Millennium Stadium to win the play-off final for promotion to the First Division.

After a season at Mansfield Town in the Second Division, in 2003 Gadsby returned to the West Midlands, joining Third Division club Kidderminster Harriers. On 15 November, he scored the first goal of his professional career, the only one in a victory over Rochdale at Spotland. He scored his only other league goal on 13 December, the winner from Bo Henriksen's cross as they came from a goal down to defeat Leyton Orient at Aggborough.

Ahead of the 2004–05 season, Gadsby moved to a new club in the next division down for the third consecutive year, joining Football Conference side Forest Green Rovers. His first goal for the club came on 9 October, equalising in a 2–1 defeat away to Canvey Island with a shot from outside the penalty area. On 20 November, with another long-range goal, he began a 79th-minute comeback as Forest Green came from 2–0 down to defeat Burton Albion 3–2 at The New Lawn.

He signed for Hinckley United in July 2006 from Forest Green Rovers, scoring the winning goal in a 2-1 victory over Farsley Celtic on 19 August.

== Death ==
Gadsby collapsed on the pitch on 9 September 2006, playing for Hinckley United in a Conference North game against Harrogate Town. Despite efforts by paramedics to revive him, he died soon afterwards in Harrogate District Hospital, three days after his 27th birthday. Medical tests revealed that Gadsby died from a heart condition known as arrhythmogenic right ventricular cardiomyopathy, an inherited condition that affects the muscle of the right ventricle of the heart.

Hinckley United's next game away at Moor Green was postponed after his death. The club, after consultation with the Football Conference, also decided to withdraw the number 5 shirt worn by Gadsby for the remainder of the season. It was replaced by the number 18 shirt in the starting line-up. A remembrance area was set up at the Marston's Stadium by the turnstiles, and a memorial game was played on 29 October 2006, at the Newton Regis recreational ground, between Tamworth Sunday league team Newton Thistle and a Leicester City old stars side.

== Honours ==
Walsall

- Football League Second Division play-offs: 2001

== See also ==
- List of footballers who died while playing
