= Pedro Matías =

Spanish footballer

Personal information
- Full name: Pedro Manuel Miguel Matías
- Date of birth: 11 October 1973 (age 53)
- Place of birth: Madrid, Spain
- Height: 1.86 m (6 ft 1 in)
- Position: Attacking midfielder

Youth career
- Ciudad de los Ángeles
- 1989–1993: Real Madrid

Senior career*
Years	Team	Apps	(Gls)
1993–1994	Real Madrid C	28	(11)
1994–1996	Real Madrid B	53	(7)
1996–1997	Almería	32	(4)
1997–1998	Logroñés	12	(0)
1998–1999	Macclesfield Town	22	(2)
1999	Tranmere Rovers	4	(0)
1999–2004	Walsall	144	(26)
2004	→ Blackpool (loan)	7	(1)
2004	Bristol Rovers	0	(0)
2004–2005	Kidderminster Harriers	5	(1)
2005	Ciempozuelos	15	(1)
2005–2006	Gimnástica Segoviana	28	(9)
2006–2007	Socuéllamos		
2007–2009	Illescas	66	(12)
2009–2010	Vallecas	20	(0)
2010–2012	Carabanchel	61	(13)
Total		497	(87)

International career
1994	Spain U21	1	(0)
- * Club domestic league appearances and goals

Pedro Manuel Miguel Matías (born 11 October 1973) is a Spanish retired footballer who played as an attacking midfielder.

He spent the vast majority of his professional career in England, representing six clubs, mainly Walsall for which he appeared in 162 competitive matches and scored 27 goals.

== Club career ==
Born in Madrid, Matías was an unsuccessful Real Madrid youth graduate, only playing for its reserves for three seasons, two of those in the Segunda División. For 1996–97 he was released but stayed in that level, appearing regularly and being relegated with Almería.

After a couple of months with Logroñés also in the second tier, Matías left his homeland, going on to spend the following decade in the English Football League with six teams: Macclesfield Town, Tranmere Rovers, Walsall – by far his biggest spell with any club in the country, five seasons – Blackpool (where he scored once against Brighton & Hove Albion), Bristol Rovers and Kidderminster Harriers (netting against Grimsby Town). On 24 March 2001, whilst playing for the Saddlers, he scored a hat-trick in a 5–1 home win over Wycombe Wanderers, being crucial to the club's promotion; the following campaign he also figured prominently as Walsall finished 18th and out of the relegation zone, notably scoring twice in a 3–2 home defeat of Rotherham United.

Matías returned to Spain in 2005 aged 31, citing personal reasons, signing with lowly Gimnástica Segoviana of Tercera División and helping the Castile and León side to win their group albeit without a final playoff promotion. Subsequently, he saw out the remainder of his career in amateur football.

== Honours ==
Walsall

- Football League Second Division play-offs: 2001
