= Jimmy Walker (footballer, born 1973) =

English footballer and coach (born 1973)

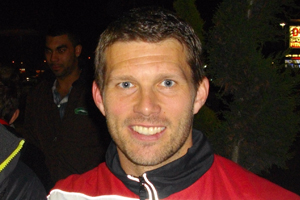
- Walker with Walsall in 2011

Personal information
- Full name: James Barry Walker
- Date of birth: 9 July 1973 (age 53)
- Place of birth: Sutton-in-Ashfield, England
- Position: Goalkeeper

Team information
- Current team: West Ham United Women (assistant manager)

Youth career
- 1991–1993: Notts County

Senior career*
Years	Team	Apps	(Gls)
1993–2004	Walsall	406	(0)
2004–2009	West Ham United	13	(0)
2008–2009	→ Colchester United (loan)	16	(0)
2009–2010	Tottenham Hotspur	0	(0)
2010–2013	Walsall	50	(0)
2014–2015	Peterborough United	0	(0)
2016–2018	Lincoln City	0	(0)
Total		487	(0)
- * Club domestic league appearances and goals

James Barry Walker (born 9 July 1973) is an English former professional footballer who played as a goalkeeper. Since 2013, Walker has been a goalkeeping coach at numerous clubs.

== Early life ==
Walker was born on 9 July 1973 at 3.00am in Sutton-in-Ashfield, Nottinghamshire, weighing 7lbs 13oz. His father, Barry, was employed as a miner before working in an office, while his mother ran her own hairdressing salon. He has a younger sister, Elizabeth. When Walker was eleven years old, his parents divorced, and he continued to live with his mother. Within a year, his father married again to his step-mother, Hilary.

== Club career ==
=== Walsall ===
Walker joined Notts County as a trainee in July 1991, but failed to make a first-team appearance and moved to Walsall in August 1993, making his debut in the same month. He went on to make 475 appearances in all competitions for Walsall in eleven years, the most by any goalkeeper for the club and became a cult hero at Bescot Stadium.

While at Walsall he was a key player in three promotion seasons, won their Player of the Season award twice and was selected in the PFA Second Division Team of the Year in 2001. He was awarded a testimonial in the summer of 2003. Walker's popularity proved such that an autobiography was commissioned to coincide with his testimonial season; ghostwritten by Walsall programme editor, Andrew Poole, it proved to be a relative success with fans of Walsall and of West Ham United.

Walker's successes at Walsall included promotion from Division Three in 1995 and from Division Two in 1999 and again in 2001. He was nicknamed "Wacka" by the Walsall fans.

=== West Ham United ===
West Ham acquired Walker's services from Walsall on a Bosman free transfer in the summer of 2004. Walker, who provided competition for Stephen Bywater, was the second choice goalkeeper at Upton Park but gained a regular first team place within a year of his arrival. Walker gained praise from West Ham fans on saving a penalty taken by Frank Lampard in the League Cup in October 2004, in front of the West Ham supporters' end at Stamford Bridge. However, despite his heroics, the Hammers lost the tie 1–0.

Walker helped West Ham win promotion in 2005, but a serious knee injury in the closing stages of the play-off final saw him miss the majority of the 2005–06 season. He made his first appearance since the knee injury, and his Premiership debut at the age of 32, in a 4–2 defeat to Portsmouth in March 2006. He made only two more first team appearances, though collected a FA Cup Final runners up medal as an unused substitute in May 2006. The presence of Roy Carroll and Robert Green as goalkeepers at West Ham during the 2006–07 season meant that Walker's first-team chances were limited; in spite of this, he still remained a popular figure at Upton Park.

On 27 November 2008, Walker signed on loan for Colchester United. He made his debut for Colchester on 29 November 2008 in their 2–1 victory against Northampton Town and played 16 times for the club before returning to West Ham.

On 3 June 2009, West Ham announced that Walker had been released.

=== Tottenham Hotspur ===
At the start of September 2009, at the age of 36, Walker was signed on a short-term contract by Tottenham Hotspur as a third choice goalkeeper. He was released by Tottenham on 1 July 2010 without making a first-team appearance.

=== Return to Walsall ===
On 29 October 2010, Walker re-signed for Walsall, on a short-term contract due to end in January 2011. On 28 January 2011 he extended his contract to the end of the 2010–11 season. On 12 April 2011 Walker made his 500th appearance for the "Saddlers", against Brentford, which ended in a 3–2 win for Walsall. On 8 June 2011, Walker signed a further one-year contract with the club.

On 7 January 2012, in a 2–2 home draw with AFC Bournemouth, Walker made his 529th appearance in all competitions for the club, equalling Colin Harrison's appearance record. He broke the record, which had stood since 1981, in an away fixture against Brentford the following week, on 14 January 2012. He kept a clean sheet in a match that finished 0–0. In July 2012, Walker signed a fresh one-year deal with Walsall which saw him working in a player-coach role with the League One club.

On 7 February 2013, after making 533 appearances for the club during two separate spells over the past two decades, Walker left Walsall by mutual consent. He had failed to make a first-team appearance during his final season with the club.

== Coaching career ==
In 2013, Walker replaced Barry Richardson as the first team goalkeeper coach at Peterborough United. On 21 February 2015, Walker left Peterborough following the sacking of manager Darren Ferguson. He has since worked at Gillingham, Lincoln City, Sunderland. He joined Ipswich Town as goalkeeping coach in 2018. In April 2021, Walker left his position at Ipswich. On 16 February 2022, West Ham confirmed Walker would be returning to the club as a goalkeeping consultant for the under-18s. On 18 November 2022, West Ham announced that Walker had been appointed as assistant manager of the Women's Super League side West Ham United Women.

== Honours ==
Walsall

- Football League Second Division runner-up: 1998–99
- Football League Third Division runner-up: 1994–95
- Football League Second Division play-offs: 2001

West Ham United

- Football League Championship play-offs: 2005
- FA Cup runner-up: 2005–06

Lincoln City

- National League: 2016–17

Individual

- Walsall Player of the Year: 1998–99, 2001–02
- PFA Team of the Year: 2000–01 Second Division

== Bibliography ==
- Walker, Jimmy; Poole, Andrew (2003), Wacka: Size Isn't Everything – The James Walker Story, Birmingham: Westpoint Printing
