= Ian Roper =

English footballer

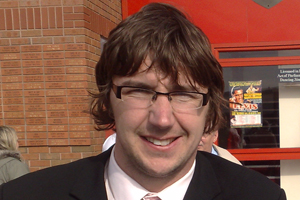

Personal information
- Full name: Ian Robert Roper
- Date of birth: 20 June 1977 (age 49)
- Place of birth: Nuneaton, England
- Height: 6 ft 3 in (1.91 m)
- Position: Defender

Senior career*
Years	Team	Apps	(Gls)
1995–2008	Walsall	325	(7)
2008–2009	Luton Town	19	(3)
2009–2011	Kettering Town	70	(1)
2011	Tamworth	0	(0)
2011–2013	Bedworth United	?	(2)
- * Club domestic league appearances and goals as of 08:03, 10 May 2012 (UTC)

Ian Robert Roper (born 20 June 1977) is an English former footballer who played as a defender.

He made over 300 appearances in the Football League for Walsall between 1995 and 2008.

== Career ==
=== Walsall ===
Born in Nuneaton, Warwickshire, Roper worked his way up through the Bescot Stadium ranks to sign professional forms in May 1995. He collected the 2002–03 Player of the Year award to add to the Young Player of the Year prize that he earned a couple of years earlier. He was an important member of the back-line who did well to get his Saddlers' career back on track after falling out of favour for a spell under former boss Ray Graydon, which saw him placed on the transfer list. He completed his resurgence by signing a new three-year contract at the end of the 2003–04 season, but suffered at the hands of suspension and injury for much of 2004–05. He returned to the side in early February 2005 and was soon back to his solid best with some commanding displays in the heart of the back-line, supported all the way by Matthew Davies

In March 2007, Roper suffered significant damage to his knee following an injury picked up during the 1–0 defeat at Stockport County on 20 February. In May of the same year, Roper agreed a new one-year contract with Walsall. Roper, along with eight other players was released at the end of the 2007–08 season by the managerless club.

=== Luton Town ===
Roper joined Luton Town on a free transfer in August 2008. His no-nonsense defending and important goals soon turned him into a fan favourite. Injury and the return of George Pilkington to central defence limited Roper's chances during the second half of the season, but he played a total of nineteen league games for Luton in 2008–09, scoring three goals.

=== Kettering Town ===
On 30 July 2009, Roper signed for Conference Premier side Kettering Town on a free transfer. He was appointed Kettering captain in September 2009. He scored his first goal for the club against Leeds United in the FA Cup and followed this up with a neat finish against Grays Athletic in the league. In May 2010, Roper signed a new two-year contract with the club.

=== Tamworth ===
After impressing during a pre-season trial, Roper followed former Poppies manager Marcus Law to rivals Tamworth in July 2011. Roper however decided a week later that he did not want to continue his playing career in the Conference, and asked for his Tamworth contract to be cancelled, as he wished to continue his playing career at a lower level. Tamworth manager Marcus Law accepted Roper's request, and he went in search of a new club.

=== Bedworth United ===
Roper agreed to drop down three levels to join Southern Football League side Bedworth United in August 2011. Bedworth United manager Steve Farmer said Roper was drawn in by the clubs ambitions and described it as a major "coup" to get someone of his experience. Roper joined having played in the club's three previous friendlies, and will have a major influence on the younger players at the club, said Farmer.

== Honours ==
Walsall

- Football League Two: 2006–07

Luton Town

- Football League Trophy: 2008–09
