= Walsall F.C. =

Association football club in England

Walsall FC
- Full name: Walsall Football Club
- Nickname: The Saddlers
- Founded: 1888; 138 years ago (as Walsall Town Swifts)
- Ground: Bescot Stadium
- Capacity: 11,300
- Owner: Trivela Group
- Chairman: Benjamin Boycott & Leigh Pomlett (co-chairmen)
- Head coach: Lee Grant
- League: EFL League Two
- 2025–26: EFL League Two, 13th of 24
- Website: saddlers.co.uk
Home colours	Away colours	Third colours

Walsall Football Club is a professional association football club based in the town of Walsall, West Midlands, England. The team competes in EFL League Two, the fourth level of the English football league system.

The club's nickname, "The Saddlers", reflects Walsall's status as a traditional centre for saddle manufacture. Walsall moved into the Bescot Stadium in 1990, having previously played at nearby Fellows Park for almost a century. The team play in a red, black and white kit, resembling the Black Country flag. Their club crest features a swift. They hold rivalries with nearby Wolverhampton Wanderers and West Bromwich Albion, as well as farther away but more regularly contested rivalries with Shrewsbury Town and Port Vale.

The club was founded in 1888 as Walsall Town Swifts, an amalgamation of Walsall Town and Walsall Swifts. The club moved to the Football Alliance from the Midland Association the following year, before being invited to help found the Football League Second Division in 1892. They returned briefly to the Football League from 1896 to 1900, before spending two decades outside the Football League, primarily in the Birmingham & District League.

Invited to help form the Football League Third Division North in 1921, Walsall remained in the third tier for 37 years. In 1958 they became a founder member of the Fourth Division, winning that Division in 1959–60, and securing promotion out of the Third Division the following season. At the end of the 1987-88 campaign, they won promotion into the Second Division for the first time, but were soon relegated back to the Fourth Division. Starting in 1998–99, they spent four of the next five seasons in the second tier. Two relegations in three years left them back in the fourth tier in 2006, but they secured an immediate promotion as 2006–07 League Two champions.

Their first match at Wembley Stadium came in the 2015 Football League Trophy Final, which they lost to Bristol City. In 2016 they missed out on promotion to the Championship by a single point, and lost the resulting playoff semi-final against Barnsley. The Saddlers ended an 11-year stay in League One with relegation in 2019. Walsall then played at Wembley again in 2025, losing 1–0 to AFC Wimbledon in the 2025 League Two play-off final.

== History ==
=== Formation and early years (1888–1939) ===
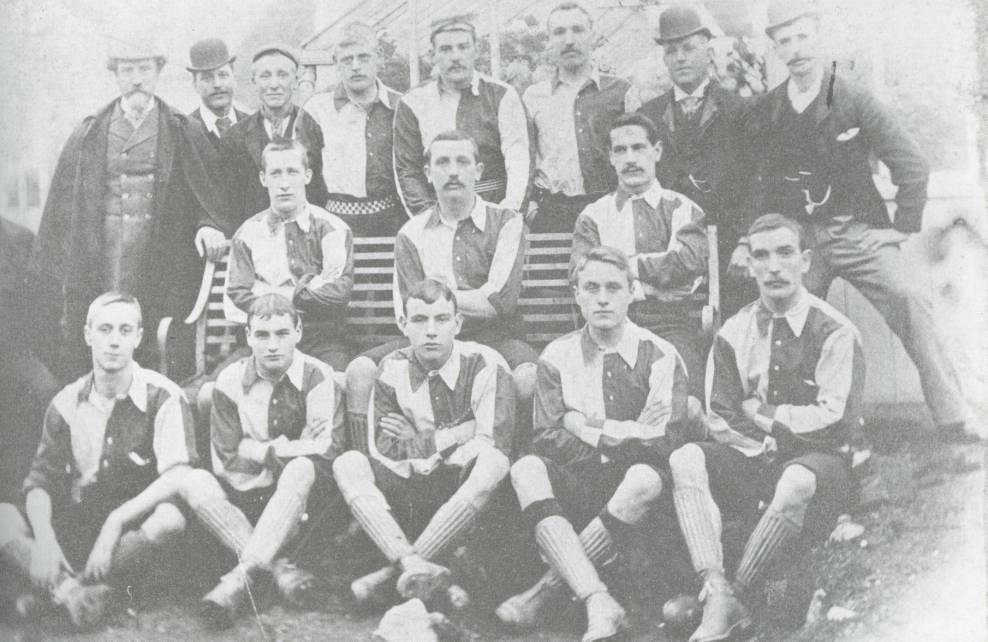
The Walsall team pictured in 1893

Walsall were formed as Walsall Town Swifts F.C. in 1888 when Walsall Town F.C. and Walsall Swifts F.C. amalgamated. Walsall Town had been founded in 1874 as Walsall Football Club and Walsall Swifties in 1875 as Victoria Swifts. Both clubs had played at the Chuckery, since April 1881 when Walsall Swifties had lost their old ground on Follyhouse Lane where they had played during 1877-1881 and the newly formed club remained at the same ground. Walsall Town Swifts' first match was a 0–0 draw against Aston Villa in the Birmingham Charity Cup final on 9 April 1888. A disagreement over the venue of the replay meant Aston Villa were awarded the trophy.

Later that year, Walsall Town Swifts played friendly matches against two founder members of the Football League; a strong Burnley side were beaten 1–0 and West Bromwich Albion were held to a 2–2 draw in front of 7,000 spectators at the Chuckery. Walsall's first league campaign in the Midland Association started with a 2–2 draw at home to Bromley on 22 September 1888. They went on to finish in 3rd place in the league.

The club were first admitted to the Football League in 1892, as founder members of the new Second Division. They moved to the West Bromwich Road ground in 1893 after complaints from local residents about them playing at the Chuckery. After finishing 14th out of 16 teams in 1894–95 the club failed to be re-elected to the Football League. At the start of the 1895 season the club once again moved grounds, this time to Fellows Park which remained the club's home for over a century.

In 1896 the club changed their name back to simply Walsall F.C. and joined the Midland League. A year later, they returned to the Second Division. The team finished in 6th place in 1898–99 in a season that, to this day, proves to be their highest ever league finish. Despite this relative success, the club once again failed re-election two years later and dropped back into the Midland League. A move to the Birmingham League followed in 1903 and in 1910 the club were elected to the Southern League. With the expansion of the Football League after World War I, Walsall became a founding member of the Third Division North in 1921 and have remained a Football League side ever since.

Walsall's highest "home" attendance was set in 1930, when they played in of front of 74,646 fans in a 3–1 defeat to Aston Villa in the FA Cup fourth round. Although a home match for Walsall, the tie was played at their opponents' Villa Park ground to ensure as many people could watch the local David vs Goliath match as possible. It remains the highest attendance that Walsall have ever played in front of and was a record crowd for Villa Park at the time.

In the years from 1921 leading up to World War II Walsall's success remained limited, with finishes of 3rd in 1922–23, 5th in 1932–33 and 4th in 1933–34 the closest the club came to achieving promotion. The decent results in the early 1930s were spearheaded by the emergence of one of Walsall's greatest ever players, Gilbert Alsop, who scored a remarkable 169 goals between 1931 and 1935.

Alsop also inspired Walsall's finest ever FA Cup result, scoring the opening goal in a 2–0 home win against Arsenal in 1933. Arsenal were regarded as the best team in the country at the time and went on to win the First Division that season and the two seasons following that. As such, the cup defeat to Third Division North side Walsall is still regarded as one of the greatest upsets in FA Cup history.

In the following season, 1934–35, Walsall continued their cup pedigree by reaching their first ever senior final in the Third Division North Cup. The Saddlers fell at the final hurdle, however, with a 2–0 defeat to Stockport County at Maine Road.

=== Post-war era and first league title (1945–1980) ===
1945–46 signalled the final season of local war-time competitions. Between January and May 1946 the Third Division South Cup was contested as a precursor for the return of full-time league football later that year. Walsall reached the final to face Bournemouth & Boscombe Athletic at Stamford Bridge but, in a repeat of their previous final appearance in 1935, they lost the match 2–0.

The return of football following the war saw a spike in attendances for many clubs across the Football League and Walsall were no different. In the 1947–48 season a number of impressive turnouts at Fellows Park, including a season-best 20,383 for the visit of Notts County, saw the club record its highest average league attendance to date of 15,711. In the same season Walsall finished in 3rd place but once again missed out on promotion to the Second Division.

The early 1950s saw some of Walsall's most troubling and dismal times in the Football League, as the club faced the re-election process four consecutive years. They finished bottom of the league in 1951–52, 1952–53 and 1953–54 and improved to only second bottom in 1954–55. The club, however, managed to retain its Football League status through this period, largely thanks to the high attendances at Fellows Park demonstrating a healthy desire for League football in Walsall.

In 1958, following a reorganisation of the Football League, Walsall became founder members of the Fourth Division — now holding the distinction of being founder members of the Second, Third and Fourth tiers. Under the management of Bill Moore, the club achieved successive promotions, scoring 102 goals on their way to winning the Fourth Division title in 1959–60 and finishing as Third Division runners-up in 1960–61. The league title in 1960 was the club's first in their 72-year history.

In the club's first season in the second tier of English football since the early 1900s a post-war record 14th-place finish was achieved. It was during this season that the club also recorded its record attendance, as 25,453 crammed into Fellows Park to see The Saddlers beat Newcastle United 1–0 in August 1961. However, after just two seasons in the Second Division, the club were relegated back to the Third Division in 1962–63. An unfortunate defeat to Charlton Athletic in a replayed final match of the season sealed Walsall's relegation, as the London club leapfrogged them in the table to survive.

One of Walsall's finest ever talents, Allan Clarke, made his breakthrough as a first team regular in the 1964–65 season. Aged just 18, he scored 2 league goals in 1964–65 and a further 23 goals in all competitions in 1965–66. He was sold to First Division Fulham for a then club record fee of £37,500 in March 1966 and went on to earn 19 caps for England and win a league title at Leeds United.

1970–71 saw the first league meeting between Walsall and their first opponents Aston Villa. The two clubs met in the Third Division with Walsall winning the home tie 3–0, thanks to two goals from Geoff Morris and a Colin Taylor penalty. The away tie at Villa Park later in the season ended goalless.

Ken Wheldon, a local businessman made good, took over the club in 1972 and brought some optimism of a brighter future. The following years were inconsistent but were buoyed by a few good cup results and the emergence of Alan Buckley, who signed for the club in 1973 and went on to become a prolific goalscorer for the club. Walsall remained in the Third Division until a further relegation to the Fourth Division in 1978–79.

It was Buckley who took on the role of player-manager for the re-build in the fourth tier. Once again The Saddlers rose from the ashes of adversity as they secured an immediate promotion. At one stage in 1979–80 Walsall recorded 21 consecutive matches without defeat, a record that still stands today. This saw the beginning of an era that became a hallmark for some of the most attractive football seen in Walsall as, under the guidance of Buckley, the side gradually established itself as promotion contenders in the Third Division.

=== League Cup run and move to the Bescot Stadium (1980–1995) ===
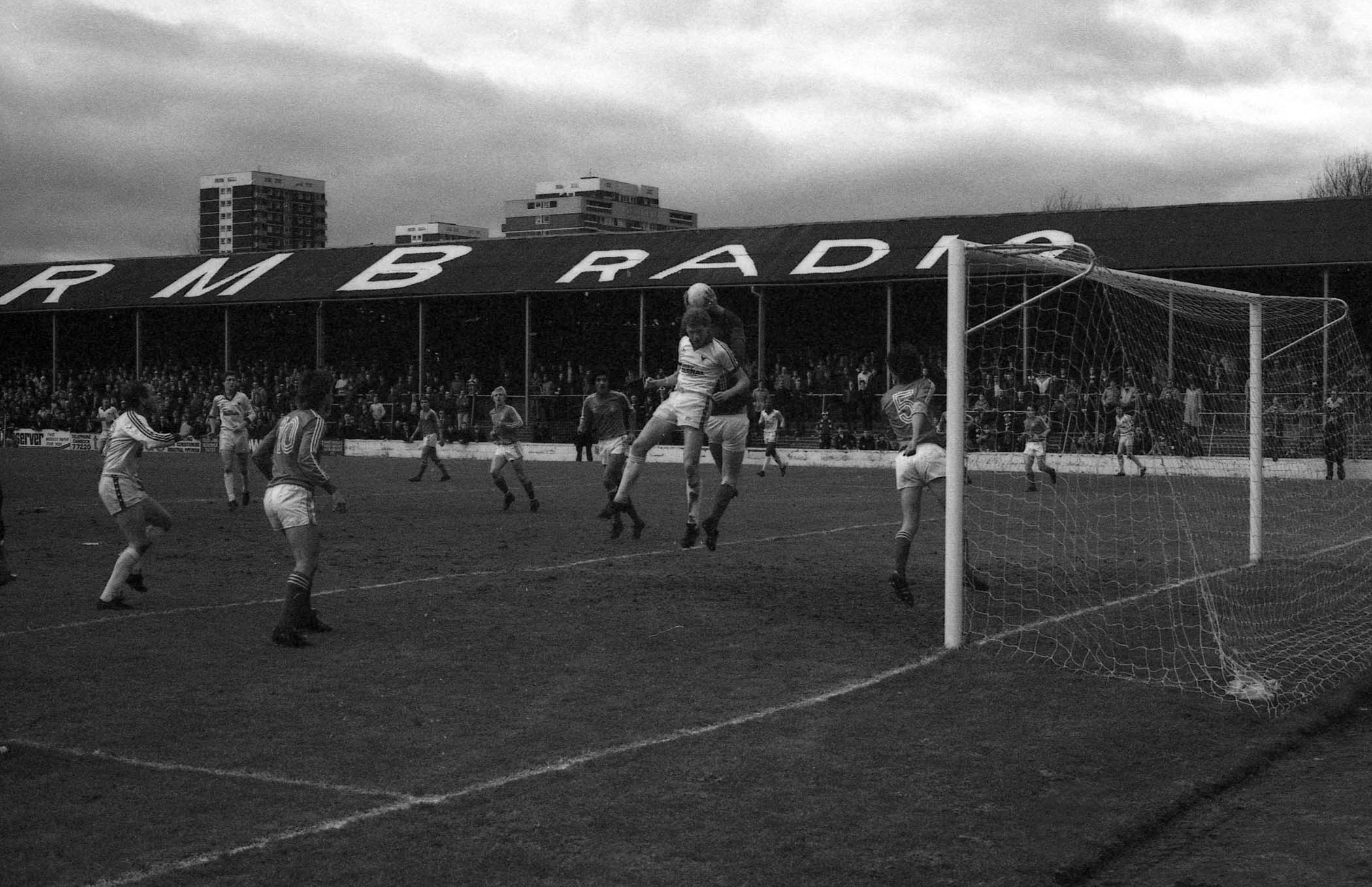
Walsall in action at Fellows Park in 1982

While consolidating in the Third Division in the early 1980s, off-the-pitch issues took prominence throughout the decade. The dilapidated state of the club's Fellows Park home was becoming a problem and, in 1982, the intention to move in to groundshare Molineux with Wolverhampton Wanderers was announced by owner Ken Wheldon. The club's fans' quickly protested against the idea, as the Save Walsall Action Group was formed, and it never came to pass.

The 1983–84 League Cup campaign was, arguably, Walsall's finest hour. After victories over Blackpool, Barnsley and local rivals Shrewsbury Town, they defeated First Division club Arsenal 2–1 in the fourth round at Highbury. A 4–2 victory over Rotherham United in the quarter-final saw The Saddlers advance to the semi-final to face holders and reigning First Division champions, Liverpool. A 2–2 draw at Anfield in the first leg had Walsall dreaming of an unlikely cup final and place in Europe, however, a second leg 2–0 defeat in front of 19,591 at Fellows Park saw Walsall lose the tie 4–2 on aggregate.

By 1986 further plans were announced to groundshare with one of the club's local rivals. This time it was at Birmingham City's St Andrew's ground. The Save Walsall Action Group was again pressed into action and, after peaceful protests and the support of the local press, the Football League blocked the move. Walsall were subsequently bought by millionaire entrepreneur and racehorse owner Terry Ramsden and with his money came high-profile signings and the attention of the national media. In 1986–87, under new manager Tommy Coakley, Walsall narrowly missed out on the play-offs but made considerable progress in the FA Cup as they defeated First Division Charlton Athletic and Birmingham City and took Watford to two replays in the fifth round.

Chart of table positions of Walsall in the Football League.

Walsall finally earned promotion to the Second Division for the first time since 1963 by winning the Third Division play-offs in 1988. Bristol City were beaten 4–0 in a replayed final at Fellows Park thanks to a David Kelly hattrick. However, the 1988–89 season saw the club immediately relegated from the Second Division and Ramsden's business empire collapse. Walsall were minutes from going out of business but survived, again through the actions of the supporters and local businessmen. A second successive relegation followed at the end of 1989–90 as Walsall were consigned to the Fourth Division once again.

The club moved to the Bescot Stadium in 1990. At the time it was a state-of-the-art arena and was only the second new Football League ground since the 1950s. The arrival at Bescot Stadium saw some stability brought back to the club after two successive relegations and the club was taken over by Jeff Bonser in 1991. Kenny Hibbitt managed the club for four years, setting the groundwork for a golden era for the club that would follow soon after his dismissal in September 1994.

New manager Chris Nicholl led the club to promotion back to the third tier (now known as Division Two after the formation of the Premier League) in his first season, building the nucleus of a strong and under-rated team. A run of four straight wins at the end of April meant Walsall needed just a point from their final game, away to Bury, to secure promotion; they duly obliged with a 0–0 scoreline to send the travelling fans home celebrating.

=== A series of ups and downs (1995–2022) ===
Two seasons of stability followed back in Division Two before Nicholl resigned. Jan Sørensen took the helm after Nicholl's departure and led the club to the fourth round of both the League Cup and FA Cup in 1997–98. Each run was ended away to a Premier League side as West Ham United won 4–1 in the League Cup and a glamour tie at Manchester United resulted in a 5–1 defeat in the FA Cup. Despite the club's cup exploits, a poor finish in the league signalled the end of Sørensen's time at Walsall after just one season.

In 1998–99, Ray Graydon took over as manager and led the club to a runners-up spot in Division Two, beating Manchester City to an automatic promotion place by five points. After the unlikely promotion to the second tier Walsall found life difficult at a higher level but battled right until the final day of the season, when relegation was finally sealed. A 2–0 defeat at Ipswich meant Walsall returned to the third tier, despite derby wins over local rivals Tamworth, Rushall Olympic and West Bromwich Albion earlier in the campaign. The Saddlers returned to the second tier of English football at the first attempt, defeating Reading 3–2, after extra time, in a thrilling play-off final at Cardiff's Millennium Stadium.

Graydon was dismissed in January 2002 following a 2–0 defeat against local rivals West Brom. Colin Lee took over and secured survival in the second tier for the first time since the early 1960s. The 2002–03 season saw Walsall avoid relegation again. However, the 2003–04 campaign ended in relegation despite a storming start which had seen the club on the brink of the play-offs going into the New Year. A slump in form saw Lee sacked in April and the appointment of star player Paul Merson as manager did not halt the slide. Walsall were ultimately relegated, by a single goal, despite a 3–2 victory over Rotherham United on the season's final day in front of a record Bescot Stadium crowd of 11,049.

Despite the club's relegation and no previous managerial experience, Merson was immediately appointed as full-time manager of the club in May 2004. A poor season in League One almost ended in successive relegations and the 2005–06 season then turned into a disastrous one for Walsall and Merson. After increasing supporter pressure following a string of poor results, culminating in a 5–0 defeat at Brentford, Merson's reign as Walsall manager came to an end in February 2006. However, it was too late and Walsall were relegated on 22 April 2006, after losing 3–1 to Huddersfield Town.

Richard Money was tasked with reviving the club's fortunes in League Two. An impressive start to the season was maintained throughout and, despite a mini-blip in February, Walsall remained in the top three for almost the entire season and were promoted back to League One after beating Notts County 2–1 away from home. On the final day of the season Walsall drew 1–1 at Swindon Town, thanks to a last-minute goal by Dean Keates in front of 3,419 travelling fans, to secure the League Two title.

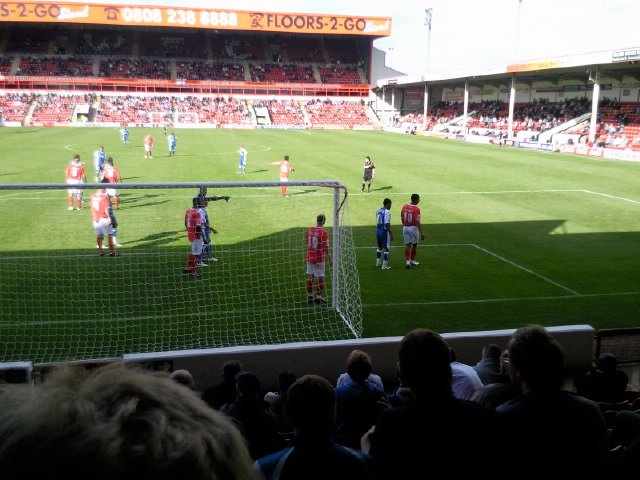
Walsall (in red shirts) playing Gillingham in 2009 at Bescot Stadium

Walsall's form continued into the new season, as the club performed strongly in 2007–08, including a run of 17 League matches without defeat and back-to-back promotions looked possible. However, a January transfer window that culminated in the sales of important first team players Danny Fox and Scott Dann to Coventry City caused a drop in form throughout 2008. The club's promotion challenge ended after a run of poor results in March leading to Richard Money resigning as manager in April.

The following seven seasons spent in League One saw largely mid-table security apart from a few flirtations with relegation. In the 2010–11 season the club sat in the relegation places from October through to March but ultimately survived due to an upturn in form following the appointment of Dean Smith as manager in January 2011. Walsall had been ten points adrift of safety, however, despite accumulating only 48 points by the end of the season they escaped relegation by one point.

The 2014–15 season was a memorable one for the club as it reached a Wembley final for the first time in its 127-year history. Walsall beat Rochdale, Tranmere Rovers, Sheffield United and Preston North End on their way to the Football League Trophy final where they were beaten 2–0 by Bristol City on Sunday 22 March 2015. The Saddlers were backed by over 29,000 supporters in a crowd of 72,315 at the national stadium.

Walsall started the 2015–16 season positively, leading to interest in manager Dean Smith. At the end of November, with The Saddlers fourth in the table, he left Walsall for Brentford; at the time of his departure he was the fourth longest serving manager in the Football League. Walsall turned to Sean O'Driscoll to replace Smith. However, after a six-game winless run and just 16 games in charge, O'Driscoll was dismissed and replaced by John Whitney. Ultimately, Walsall missed out on promotion by just one point and lost in the play-off semi-finals to Barnsley.

Following the decimation of their promotion challenging team, Walsall struggled for the next three seasons in League One and, after a disastrous spell in charge for Dean Keates following the dismissal of Whitney, the club were relegated back to the fourth tier at the end of the 2018–19 season. Following relegation, a new era began with Darrell Clarke taking over as manager and Jeff Bonser ending his 28-year reign as owner and chairman by selling his 76% majority shareholding of the club to Leigh Pomlett in July 2019. Walsall failed to make a League Two promotion challenge in the 2019–20 or 2020–21 seasons, finishing in 13th and 19th place respectively, halfway through the latter Clarke left for Port Vale. Ahead of the 2021–22 season Matthew Taylor was appointed new head coach with Neil McDonald as his assistant. However, following a run of seven successive losses which left the club in 21st place and just four points outside the relegation zone, Taylor was dismissed in February 2022 and replaced by Michael Flynn who saved the club from relegation as they finished 16th.

=== A new era of American ownership (2022–present) ===
On 6 June 2022, the club announced that American sports investment firm Trivela Group LLC had purchased a majority of shares belonging to chairman Leigh Pomlett, becoming 51% majority shareholders. A positive run of form in late 2022 saw the club within touching distance of the play-off places for the first time since relegation. However, the end of top goalscorer Danny Johnson's loan spell with the club in January led to an indifferent second half of the season. Ultimately, Flynn was sacked as the club again finished 16th. Interim head coach Mat Sadler was appointed full-time head coach in May 2023. Sadler led the team to a record breaking run of eight league wins in a row, securing the record with a 5–1 victory over Tranmere Rovers at the Bescot Stadium on 11 January 2025, before extending it the following week to nine. Despite leading the league by 12 points and the play-off positions by 15 in January, a poor second half of the season saw Walsall miss out on automatic promotion on the final day of the season and subsequently lose the play-off final 1–0 to AFC Wimbledon. On 11 March 2026, with the club in 11th place, Sadler was dismissed with his assistant Darren Byfield taking charge for the remainder of the season.

On May 14 2026, Lee Grant was officially named as the new head coach.

== Rivals ==
A 2013 survey revealed Walsall fans consider Black Country neighbours Wolverhampton Wanderers to be the club's main rivals. However, meetings between the teams are relatively rare, with Wolves having spent most of their existence in the top two tiers of English football. Only 16 competitive fixtures have been played between Walsall and Wolves, with the most recent occurring in 2014. Meetings with the Black Country's other professional club, West Bromwich Albion, are similarly rare, with The Saddlers and The Baggies having clashed just 14 times. However, the Black Country rivals did meet on numerous occasions during wartime regionalised league fixtures. A match between two of those three clubs is called Black Country derby.

More regularly-contested rivalries exist with Shrewsbury Town and Port Vale, who are often The Saddlers' geographically closest league fixtures. Walsall have the upper hand in the Shrewsbury and Port Vale rivalries, having won significantly more fixtures than they have lost.

== Grounds ==
=== The Chuckery ===
This multi-purpose sports ground was situated in a district near to the Walsall Arboretum. It comprised some 12 football pitches and four good-sized cricket squares. It was the first ever home ground for Walsall F.C. from 1875 until 1893.

=== West Bromwich Road ===
The new ground in West Bromwich Road, which had a capacity of just over 4,500, proved to be a lucky omen for The Saddlers between 1893 and 1896.

=== Fellows Park ===
Fellows Park was a former football stadium in Walsall, England. It was the home ground of Walsall F.C. from 1896 until 1990, when the team moved to the Bescot Stadium.

=== Bescot Stadium ===
Bescot Stadium, currently also known as the Pallet-Track Bescot Stadium for sponsorship purposes, is the home ground of Walsall Football Club. It was built in 1989–90 at a cost of £4.5m, replacing the club's previous ground, Fellows Park, which was located a quarter of a mile away. The ground was opened by Sir Stanley Matthews. Upon Jeff Bonser stepping down from his role at the club, Leigh Pomlett agreed an option to reunite the Saddlers with their stadium freehold "in due time". On 16 December 2022 the club executed its option to acquire Poundland Bescot Stadium and is now the owner of the stadium, the Saddlers Club, and the adjoining land. On Saturday 27 January 2024 the Supporters Club, formerly known as the Saddlers Club, re-opened as a sports bar under the new name The Locker.

== Players ==
=== Current squad ===
As of 1 September 2026

Note: Flags indicate national team as defined under FIFA eligibility rules; some limited exceptions apply. Players may hold more than one non-FIFA nationality.

No.	Pos.	Nation	Player
1	GK	ENG	Jed Ward
3	DF	ENG	Mason Hancock
4	DF	WAL	James Connolly
5	DF	ENG	Harrison Burke
6	MF	AUT	Sven Sprangler
7	FW	ENG	Tai Sodje
8	MF	WAL	Charlie Crew (on loan from Leeds United)
9	FW	SCO	Andrew Dallas
10	MF	ENG	Lewis Simper
11	MF	ENG	Reece Smith
14	MF	ENG	Antony Evans (on loan from Huddersfield Town)
15	MF	ENG	Isaac Moore (on loan from Coventry City)
17	MF	JAM	Courtney Clarke
19	FW	SCO	Aaron Pressley
20	DF	ENG	Roman Dixon

No.	Pos.	Nation	Player
22	DF	ENG	Elicha Ahui
23	MF	ENG	Alex Pattison
24	DF	ENG	Harry Williams
25	DF	ENG	Declan Skura (on loan from Wycombe Wanderers)
26	DF	WAL	Ryan Leak
29	DF	IRL	James Furlong
30	DF	ENG	Stan Straw
31	GK	ENG	Tom Wooster
33	MF	ENG	Will Etheridge
37	MF	GHA	Albert Adomah
45	DF	ENG	Ellis Harris
48	MF	ENG	Archie Bunn
56	MF	ENG	Jaden Kandemiri
57	MF	ENG	Ryan Sjoerdsma

=== Out on loan ===
As of 14 August 2026

Note: Flags indicate national team as defined under FIFA eligibility rules; some limited exceptions apply. Players may hold more than one non-FIFA nationality.

No.	Pos.	Nation	Player
2	DF	SKN	Rico Browne (at Woking until January 2027)
16	MF	IRL	Ronan Maher (at Wealdstone until 25 December 2026)
18	DF	KEN	Vincent Harper (at Exeter City until 30 June 2027)

No.	Pos.	Nation	Player
21	GK	ENG	Jenson Kilroy (at Malvern Town until 21 October 2026)
—	MF	NZL	Jago Godden (at Drogheda United until January 2027)

== Management, staff and directors ==
=== First team ===
Position	Name
Head coach	Lee Grant
Assistant head coach	Richard Keogh
First-team coach	Ryan Simmonds
Goalkeeper coach	Dan Still
Physiotherapist	Meldrick Gomes
Fitness coach	Jonathan Fenner
Kit man	David Joyce

=== Academy ===
Position	Name
Academy manager	Martyn Bowles
Professional development phase coach	
Lead youth development phase coach	Scott Lowrie
Lead foundation phase coach	Simon Noakes
Head of academy coaching	Martyn Bowles

=== Medical staff ===
Position	Name
Club doctor	Dr David Arundel
Honorary club surgeon	Dr Ashven Pimpalnerkar

=== Directors ===
Position	Name
Co-chairman	Benjamin Boycott
Co-chairman	Leigh Pomlett
Chief executive	Ben Sadler
Associate director	Richard Tisdale
Associate director	Roy Whalley
Associate director	Graham Whittaker
Associate director	Richard O'Kelly
Associate director	Adam Davy

Information correct as of 30 August 2024.

== Former players and managers ==
=== Players of the Year ===
As voted for by Walsall supporters at the end of each season. Current players in bold. (Note: Players of the Year list is incomplete.)

- 19??–?? (England) Tony Richards
- 1968–69 (England) Bob Wesson
- 1970–71 (England) Bob Wesson
- 1971–72 (England) Colin Harrison
- 1973–74 (England) Alan Buckley
- 1975–76 (England) Alan Buckley
- 1980–81 (England) Colin Harrison
- 1981–82 (England) Peter Hart
- 1994–95 (Northern Ireland) Kevin Wilson
- 1995–96 (England) Adi Viveash
- 1996–97 (England) Adi Viveash
- 1997–98 (France) Jeff Peron
- 1998–99 (England) Jimmy Walker
- 1999–00 (Argentina) Gino Padula
- 2000–01 (Portugal) Jorge Leitão
- 2001–02 (England) Jimmy Walker
- 2002–03 (England) Ian Roper
- 2003–04 (Scotland) Paul Ritchie
- 2004–05 (England) Matty Fryatt
- 2005–06 (Republic of Ireland) Anthony Gerrard
- 2006–07 (England) Dean Keates
- 2007–08 (Republic of Ireland) Anthony Gerrard
- 2008–09 (Trinidad and Tobago) Clayton Ince
- 2009–10 (England) Troy Deeney
- 2010–11 (England) Andy Butler
- 2011–12 (England) Andy Butler
- 2012–13 (Northern Ireland) Will Grigg
- 2013–14 (England) Sam Mantom
- 2014–15 (England) Richard O'Donnell
- 2015–16 (England) Adam Chambers
- 2016–17 (England) Jason McCarthy
- 2017–18 (England) Joe Edwards
- 2018–19 (England) Andy Cook
- 2019–20 (England) Josh Gordon
- 2020–21 (Republic of Ireland) Liam Kinsella
- 2021–22 (Republic of Ireland) Liam Kinsella
- 2022–23 (Montserrat) Donervon Daniels
- 2023–24 (England) Isaac Hutchinson
- 2024–25 (England) Taylor Allen
- 2025–26 (Sierra Leone) Daniel Kanu

=== Top goalscorers ===
Includes league goals only. Current players in bold.

- 1994–95 (Bermuda) Kyle Lightbourne (**23**)
- 1995–96 (Bermuda) Kyle Lightbourne (**15**)
- 1995–96 (Note: Lightbourne and Wilson joint top scorers in 1995–96) (Northern Ireland) Kevin Wilson (**15**)
- 1996–97 (Bermuda) Kyle Lightbourne (**20**)
- 1997–98 (France) Roger Boli (**12**)
- 1998–99 (England) Andy Rammell (**18**)
- 1999–2000 (England) Michael Ricketts (**11**)
- 2000–01 (Portugal) Jorge Leitão (**18**)
- 2001–02 (Portugal) Jorge Leitão (**8**)
- 2002–03 (Brazil) Júnior (**15**)
- 2003–04 (Portugal) Jorge Leitão (**7**)
- 2004–05 (England) Matty Fryatt (**15**)
- 2005–06 (England) Matty Fryatt (**11**)
- 2006–07 (England) Dean Keates (**13**)
- 2007–08 (England) Tommy Mooney (**11**)
- 2008–09 (England) Michael Ricketts (**12**)
- 2009–10 (England) Troy Deeney (**14**)
- 2010–11 (England) Julian Gray (**10**)
- 2011–12 (England) Alex Nicholls (**7**)
- 2011–12 (Note: Nicholls and Macken joint top scorers in 2011–12) (Republic of Ireland) Jon Macken (**7**)
- 2012–13 (Northern Ireland) Will Grigg (**19**)
- 2013–14 (England) Craig Westcarr (**14**)
- 2014–15 (Wales) Tom Bradshaw (**17**)
- 2015–16 (Wales) Tom Bradshaw (**17**)
- 2016–17 (England) Erhun Oztumer (**15**)
- 2017–18 (England) Erhun Oztumer (**15**)
- 2018–19 (England) Andy Cook (**13**)
- 2019–20 (England) Josh Gordon (**9**)
- 2020–21 (England) Elijah Adebayo (**10**)
- 2021–22 (England) George Miller (**12**)
- 2022–23 (England) Danny Johnson (**12**)
- 2023–24 (England) Isaac Hutchinson (**12**)
- 2024-25 (England) Nathan Lowe (**15**)
- 2025-26 (Sierra Leone) Daniel Kanu (**15**)

=== International Saddlers ===
List of players who have earned full international caps while at Walsall. Current players in bold.

- (England) Alf Jones (**2**) 1882 (Note: Alf Jones earned both England caps while playing for Walsall Swifts but later went on to play for Walsall Town Swifts.)
- (England) Albert Aldridge (**1**) 1889
- (Wales) Caesar Jenkyns (**2**) 1898
- (Ireland) Jack Taggart (**1**) 1899
- (Ireland) Mick O'Brien (**1**) 1929
- (Wales) Roy John (**1**) 1931
- (Ireland) Dick Griffiths (**1**) 1934
- (Republic of Ireland) Mick Kearns (**15**) 1973–79
- (Republic of Ireland) Miah Dennehy (**2**) 1975–77
- (Republic of Ireland) David Kelly (**3**) 1987–88
- (Bermuda) Kyle Lightbourne (?) (Note: Kyle Lightbourne is listed as having achieved international caps while at the club in The Complete Record of Walsall Football Club but no number is given to how many.) 1993–97
- (Sierra Leone) John Keister (**3**) 1999–00
- (Jamaica) Paul Hall (**5**) 2000–01
- (Hungary) Gábor Bukrán (**1**) 2000
- (Jamaica) Fitzroy Simpson (**10**) 2001–03
- (New Zealand) Danny Hay (**4**) 2002–03
- (Jamaica) Jamie Lawrence (**6**) 2003
- (Wales) Carl Robinson (**1**) 2003 (Note: Carl Robinson on loan from Portsmouth when he earned his cap.)
- (Northern Ireland) Chris Baird (**1**) 2003 (Note: Chris Baird on loan from Southampton when he earned his cap.)
- (Scotland) Paul Ritchie (**1**) 2004
- (Trinidad and Tobago) Clayton Ince (**15**) 2008–09
- (Northern Ireland) Will Grigg (**1**) 2012
- (Saint Kitts and Nevis) Romaine Sawyers (**15**) 2014–16
- (Philippines) Neil Etheridge (**9**) 2015–17
- (Cyprus) Jason Demetriou (**5**) 2015–16
- (Wales) Tom Bradshaw (**1**) 2016
- (Cyprus) Andreas Makris (**7**) 2016–17
- (Canada) Simeon Jackson (**2**) 2016–17
- (Afghanistan) Maziar Kouhyar (**6**) 2017–19
- (Guyana) Liam Gordon (**19**) 2023–25
- (Montserrat) Brandon Comley (**6**) 2023–25
- (Montserrat) Donervon Daniels (**8**) 2023–25
- (Saint Kitts and Nevis) Cayden Bennett (**1**) 2024
- (Kenya) **Vincent Harper** (**1**) 2025–
- (Sierra Leone) Daniel Kanu (**1**) 2026
- (Jamaica) **Courtney Clarke** (**6**) 2025–
- (Saint Kitts and Nevis) **Rico Browne** (**4**) 2026–

=== Players with 300 or more appearances ===
Includes competitive appearances only. Current players in bold.

- (England) Jimmy Walker (**535**) 1993–04, 2010–13
- (England) Colin Harrison (**527**) 1964–82
- (England) Colin Taylor (**504**) 1958–63, 1964–68, 1969–73
- (England) Nick Atthey (**503**) 1963–77
- (England) Kenny Mower (**493**) 1978–91
- (England) Alan Buckley (**482**) 1973–85
- (England) Chris Marsh (**481**) 1987–01
- (England) Peter Hart (**476**) 1980–90
- (England) Brian Caswell (**459**) 1972–85
- (England) Frank Gregg (**445**) 1960–73
- (England) Stan Bennett (**438**) 1963–75
- (England) Darren Wrack (**384**) 1998–08
- (England) Sammy Holmes (**381**) 1888–02
- (England) Ian Roper (**380**) 1995–08
- (England) Albert McPherson (**367**) 1954–64
- (England) Craig Shakespeare (**355**) 1981–89
- (England) Tony Richards (**355**) 1954–63
- (England) Ken Hodgkisson (**352**) 1955–66
- (England) Billy Bradford (**352**) 1926–38
- (Cameroon) Charlie Ntamark (**338**) 1990–97
- (England) Adam Chambers (**331**) 2011–19
- (Republic of Ireland) Mick Kearns (**322**) 1973–79, 1982–85
- (England) Dave Serella (**304**) 1974–82

=== Players with 50 or more goals ===
Includes competitive appearances only. Current players in bold.

- (England) Alan Buckley (**202**) 1973–85
- (England) Tony Richards (**197**) 1954–63
- (England) Colin Taylor (**189**) 1958–63, 1964–68, 1969–73
- (England) Gilbert Alsop (**171**) 1931–35, 1938–47
- (England) Sammy Holmes (**108**) 1888–02
- (Bermuda) Kyle Lightbourne (**85**) 1993–97
- (Republic of Ireland) David Kelly (**80**) 1983–88
- (Portugal) Jorge Leitão (**71**) 2000–06
- (England) Richard O'Kelly (**65**) 1979–86, 1988
- (England) Bill Evans (**64**) 1934–39
- (England) Craig Shakespeare (**60**) 1981–89
- (England) Don Penn (**58**) 1977–83
- (England) Ken Hodgkisson (**56**) 1955–66
- (England) Jack Aston (**55**) 1896–99, 1903–04, 1905–06
- (England) Moses Lane (**55**) 1920–21, 1927–29
- (England) Wally Brown (**53**) 1938–44, 1945–48
- (England) Jack Vinall (**53**) 1940–43, 1944–47
- (England) Darren Wrack (**52**) 1998–08
- (England) Nicky Cross (**52**) 1985–88
- (England) George Andrews (**51**) 1972–77
- (England) Johnny Devlin (**51**) 1947–52
- (England) W. Robinson (**51**) 1907–09, 1910–13

=== Notable managers ===
The following managers have all made notable achievements for Walsall. Each has led the club to at least one of the following while in charge: winning promotion, reaching the final of a cup competition or recording the club's best result in a league season or cup competition.

Name	Years	P	W	D	L	Win%	Honours	Notes
(England) G. Hughes ^{sec}	1898–99	35	15	12	8	42.86	Second Division 6th place 1898–99	(Note: G. Hughes served as secretary-manager.)
(Scotland) Andrew Wilson	1934–37	130	47	30	53	36.15	Third Division North Cup runners-up 1935	
(England) Tommy Lowes	1937–39	102	32	21	49	31.37	FA Cup fifth round 1938–39	
(England) Harry Hibbs	1944–51	305	113	73	119	37.05	Third Division South Cup runners-up 1946	
(England) Bill Moore	1957–63; 1969–72	470	190	113	167	40.43	Fourth Division champions 1959–60; Third Division runners-up 1960–61	
(Scotland) Doug Fraser	1974–77	163	60	45	58	36.81	FA Cup fifth round 1974–75	
(Scotland) Dave Mackay	1977–78	72	30	27	15	41.67	FA Cup fifth round 1977–78	
(England) Alan Buckley	1979–82; 1982–86	349	148	92	109	42.41	Fourth Division runners-up 1979–80; League Cup semi-finals 1983–84	(Note: Alan Buckley's totals include short spell as joint-manager with Neil Martin.)
(Scotland) Tommy Coakley	1986–88	148	62	37	49	41.89	FA Cup fifth round 1986–87; Third Division play-off winners 1987–88	
(Northern Ireland) Chris Nicholl	1994–97	157	72	38	47	45.86	Third Division runners-up 1994–95	
(England) Ray Graydon	1998–02	199	79	49	71	39.70	Second Division runners-up 1998–99; Second Division play-off winners 2000–01	
(England) Colin Lee	2002–04	116	38	30	48	32.76	FA Cup fifth round 2001–02; FA Cup fifth round 2002–03	
(England) Richard Money	2006–08	102	44	33	25	43.14	League Two champions 2006–07	
(England) Dean Smith	2011–15	260	84	96	80	32.31	Football League Trophy runners-up 2015	

== Honours ==
League

- Third Division / Second Division (level 3)
  - Runners-up: 1960–61, 1998–99
  - Play-off winners: 1988, 2001
- Fourth Division / Third Division / League Two (level 4)
  - Champions: 1959–60, 2006–07
  - Runners-up: 1979–80, 1994–95

Cup

- Football League Trophy
  - Runners-up: 2014–15
- Third Division North Cup
  - Runners-up: 1934–35
- Third Division South Cup
  - Runners-up: 1945–46
- Birmingham Senior Cup
  - Winners: 1880–81, 1896–97, 1897–98, 1993–94
- Staffordshire Senior Cup
  - Winners: 1881–82, 1884–85, 1922–23, 1926–27, 1928–29, 1967–68
- Walsall Senior Cup
  - Winners: 1888–89, 2014–15, 2016–17

== Club records ==
Competitions

- Highest ever Football League position: 6th, Second Division 1898–99
- Highest post-war Football League position: 14th, Second Division 1961–62
- FA Cup: 5th Round, 1938–39, 1974–75, 1977–78, 1986–87, 2001–02, 2002–03
- League Cup: Semi-final, 1983–84

Scores

- League Win: 10–0 vs. Darwen. Second Division, 4 March 1899
- League Defeat: 0–12 vs. Small Heath. Second Division, 17 December 1892
- Cup Win: 12–0 vs. Warmley. FA Cup 1st Qualifying Round, 27 September 1890
- Cup Defeat: 0–7 vs. Worcester City. FA Cup 1st Qualifying Round, 11 October 1913

Sequences

- Most League Games Won in a Row (9): 2024–25
- Most League Games Lost in a Row (15): 1988–89
- Most League Games without Defeat (21): 1979–80
- Most League Games without Victory (18): 1988–89

Attendances

- Highest League Attendance (at Fellows Park): 25,453 v. Newcastle United. Second Division (now Championship), 29 August 1961
- Highest League Attendance (at Bescot Stadium): 11,049 v. Rotherham United. First Division (now Championship), 9 May 2004
- Highest Third Division (now League One) Attendance: 19,589 v. Notts County, 18 March 1950
- Highest Fourth Division (now League Two) Attendance: 15,403 v. Carlisle United, 10 September 1959
- Highest FA Cup Attendance: 24,045 v. Fulham, 4th Round Replay, 30 January 1962
- Highest League Cup Attendance: 21,066 v. Liverpool. 4th Round, 17 February 1968
- Highest Football League Trophy Attendance: 10,038 v. Preston North End. Area Final Second Leg, 27 January 2015
- Highest Average Attendance (at Fellows Park): 15,711, 1947–48
- Highest Average Attendance (at Bescot Stadium): 7,853, 2003–04

Players

- Most Appearances: 534 – Jimmy Walker 1993–04, 2010–13
- Most League Appearances: 473 – Colin Harrison 1964–82
- Top Goalscorer: 202 – Alan Buckley 1973–85
- Top League Goalscorer: 185 – Tony Richards 1954–63
- Most League Goals in a Season: 39 – Gilbert Alsop 1933–34 and 1934–35
- Most capped player: 19 (Guyana) Liam Gordon 2023–25
- Highest Transfer Fee Paid: £270,000 (€300,000) – for Andreas Makris to Anorthosis Famagusta, August 2016
- Highest Transfer Fee Received: £1,500,000 – for Rico Henry from Brentford, August 2016
