= 1988 Football League Third Division play-off final =

Association football match

| Walsall | Bristol City |
| 3 | 3 |
- on aggregate Walsall won 4–0 after a replay

First leg
| Walsall | Bristol City |
| 3 | 1 |
- Date: 25 May 1988
- Venue: Ashton Gate, Bristol
- Referee: Joe Worrall
- Attendance: 25,128

Second leg
| Bristol City | Walsall |
| 2 | 0 |
- Date: 28 May 1988
- Venue: Fellows Park, Walsall
- Referee: George Tyson
- Attendance: 13,941

Replay
| Bristol City | Walsall |
| 0 | 4 |
- Date: 30 May 1988
- Venue: Fellows Park, Walsall
- Referee: George Courtney
- Attendance: 13,007

The 1988 Football League Third Division play-off final was an association football match contested by Walsall and Bristol City over two legs on 25 and 28 May 1988, and then a replay on 30 May 1988, to determine which club would play the following season in the Second Division. Walsall had finished in third place in the Third Division while Bristol City finished fifth. They were joined in the play-offs by fourth-placed Notts County and Sheffield United, who had finished in 21st place in the division above. Walsall defeated Notts County in their semi-final while Bristol City beat Sheffield United in the other.

The first leg of the final took place on 25 May 1988 at Ashton Gate in Bristol and was refereed by Joe Worrall. Alan Walsh scored directly from a free kick for Bristol City before Walsall equalised in the 62nd minute through Trevor Christie. David Kelly put Walsall ahead with ten minutes to go and scored again just before the final whistle to end the match 3–1. The second leg took place three days later at Fellows Park in Walsall, refereed by George Tyson. Rob Newman gave Bristol City the lead in the 31st minute and Carl Shutt made it 2–0 midway through the second half. The match ended with the aggregate score at 3–3 so a penalty shootout was used to determine the venue for a replay: Walsall won 4–2 so the deciding match took place at Fellows Park on 30 May 1988. A hat-trick from Kelly along with a header from Phil Hawker secured a 4–0 victory for Walsall and promotion to the Second Division.

Walsall's manager Tommy Coakley was sacked in December 1988 after a losing streak of eleven games, culminating in a 5–1 Boxing Day defeat at home to Oxford United which sent Walsall to the bottom of the league. He was replaced the following January by John Barnwell, but Walsall ended their following season in last position in the Second Division and were relegated back to the Third Division. Bristol City's next season saw them finish in 11th position in the Third Division, five places and nine points outside the play-offs.

== Route to the final ==
Football League Second Division final table, relegation positions
| Pos | Team | Pld | W | D | L | GF | GA | GD | Pts |
|---|---|---|---|---|---|---|---|---|---|
| 21 | Sheffield United | 44 | 13 | 7 | 24 | 45 | 74 | −29 | 46 |
| 22 | Reading | 44 | 10 | 12 | 22 | 44 | 70 | −26 | 42 |
| 23 | Huddersfield Town | 44 | 6 | 10 | 28 | 41 | 100 | −59 | 28 |

Football League Third Division final table, leading positions
| Pos | Team | Pld | W | D | L | GF | GA | GD | Pts |
|---|---|---|---|---|---|---|---|---|---|
| 1 | Sunderland | 46 | 27 | 12 | 7 | 92 | 48 | +44 | 93 |
| 2 | Brighton & Hove Albion | 46 | 23 | 15 | 8 | 69 | 47 | +22 | 84 |
| 3 | Walsall | 46 | 23 | 13 | 10 | 68 | 50 | +18 | 82 |
| 4 | Notts County | 46 | 23 | 12 | 11 | 82 | 49 | +33 | 81 |
| 5 | Bristol City | 46 | 21 | 12 | 13 | 77 | 62 | +15 | 75 |

This was the second time the Football League play-offs had taken place. They were introduced in the previous season as part of the "Heathrow Agreement", a ten-point proposal to restructure the Football League. For the first two years of the play-offs, the club which had finished immediately above the relegation places in the Second Division competed with three clubs from the Third Division for a place in the second tier of English football for the following season.

Sheffield United had finished the 1987–88 season in 21st place in the Second Division, having won their final game against bottom club Huddersfield Town on the last day of the season to avoid automatic relegation. Walsall had finished in third place in the Third Division, two points behind Brighton & Hove Albion (who were automatically promoted in second position) and eleven behind Sunderland (who were promoted as champions). Bristol City ended the regular season in fifth place, two positions and seven points below Walsall.

Walsall's opponents in their play-off semi-final were Notts County with the first match of the two-legged tie being played at Meadow Lane in Nottingham on 15 May 1988. The home side took an early lead when Dean Yates scored with a header from an Aidey Thorpe inswinging cross in the second minute of the match. Walsall started to control the match and four minutes before half-time, David Kelly scored the equaliser from a Richard O'Kelly cross. Two minutes after half-time, Craig Shakespeare gave Walsall the lead with a low strike and nine minutes later Kelly scored Walsall's third goal after holding off a tackle from Chris Withe to convert O'Kelly's headed pass. No further goals were scored and the first leg ended 3–1 to Walsall. The second leg of the semi-final took place at Fellows Park in Walsall three days later. Notts County took an early lead, once again with a headed goal from Yates, in the 12th minute of the match. Although the visiting side dominated the match and made several chances to score, Walsall equalised on the hour mark when Trevor Christie scored from around 12 yards (11 m) after the initial strike by Kelly was blocked by Yates. The match ended 1–1 and Walsall progressed to the final with a 4–2 aggregate victory.

Bristol City faced Sheffield United in the other semi-final and the first leg was held at Ashton Gate in Bristol on 15 May 1988. In front of their largest crowd in nine years, Alan Walsh put the home side ahead two minutes before half-time with his 14th goal of the season after shooting from close range after a long throw-in from Steve McClaren. Bristol City's goalkeeper Keith Waugh made a number of saves, from Richard Cadette, Wally Downes and Paul Stancliffe, and the match ended 1–0. The second leg was played three days later at Bramall Lane in Sheffield. In the 16th minute, Bristol City took the lead when Carl Shutt scored with a diving header. Colin Morris equalised after half-time after he lifted the ball over Waugh in the Bristol City goal and the match ended 1–1. With a 2–1 aggregate victory, Bristol City progressed to the final while Sheffield United were relegated to the Third Division.

== Match ==
=== Background ===
Bristol City had last played in the Second Division in the 1979–80 season after which they suffered three consecutive relegations before gaining promotion from the Fourth Division in the 1983–84 season. Walsall had been promoted to the Third Division after ending the 1979–80 season as Fourth Division runners-up. They had finished the previous season in eighth position, one place outside the play-offs. Before the final, there was speculation over the future of Kelly who had scored 25 goals for Walsall during the season: he was reportedly the subject of a £500,000 transfer bid from First Division side Liverpool. Colin Gordon was no longer available for selection by Bristol City as Reading had refused to extend his loan. Gordon had scored five goals in ten games for Bristol City, but his loan had expired the day of the first leg of the final: Reading had insisted on a transfer fee of £70,000 to secure Kelly's services but Bristol City's manager Joe Jordan said "there's no way we can afford that."

Both matches between the sides during the regular season ended in draws, 1–1 at Fellows Park in September 1987 and 0–0 at Ashton Gate the following February. According to bookmakers, Bristol City were clear favourites to win the final over two legs.

=== First leg ===
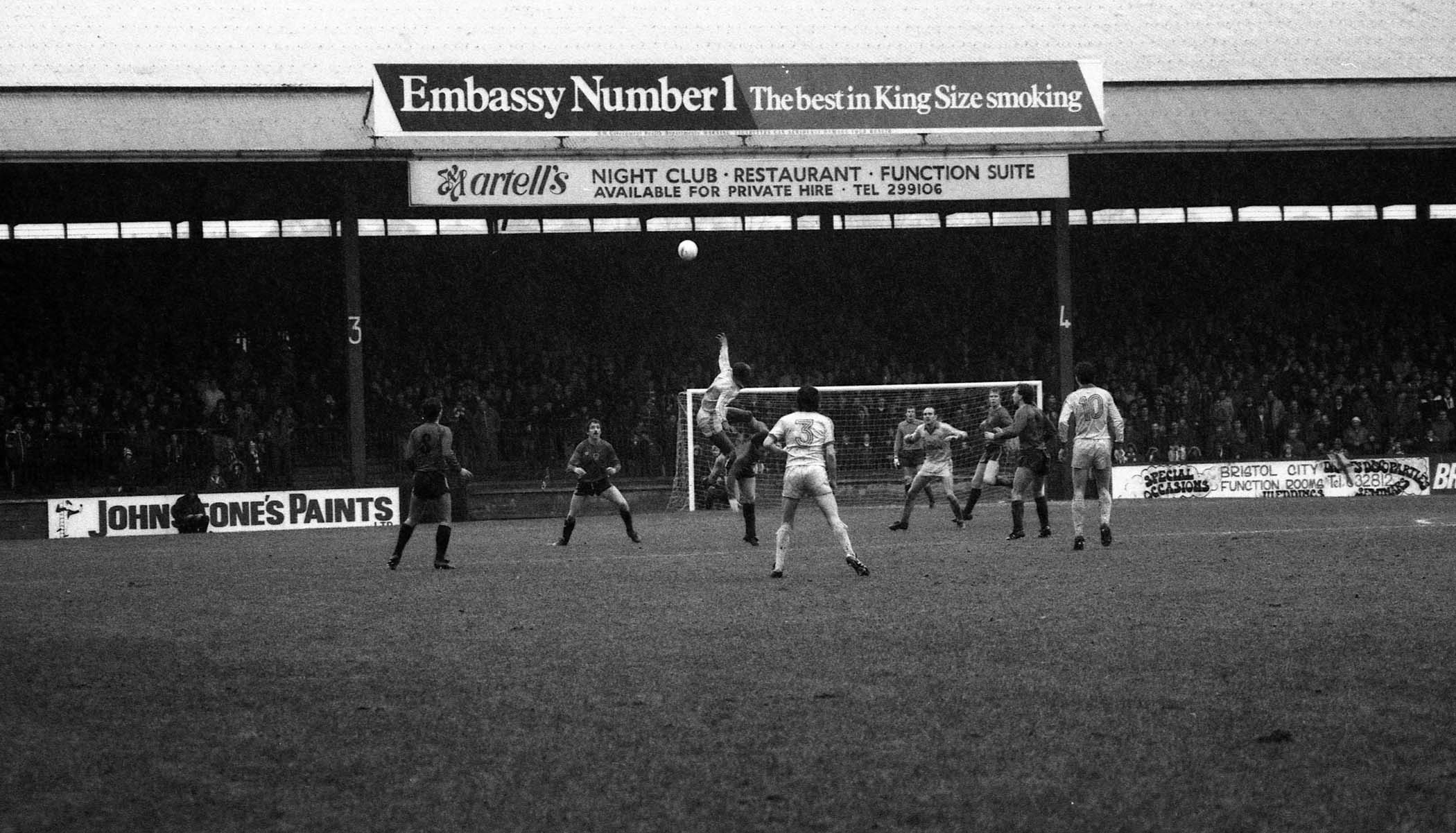
Ashton Gate (pictured in 1982) hosted the first leg of the final.

==== Summary ====
The first leg of the final kicked off at 7:45 p.m. on 25 May 1988 at Ashton Gate in front of 25,128 spectators and refereed by Joe Worrall. Walsall made the better start with Christie going close to scoring within the opening minute of the match. Bristol City's Walsh then saw his carefully placed shot saved by Fred Barber, the Walsall goalkeeper. Seven minutes before half-time, Graeme Forbes fouled Steve Neville and Walsh scored directly from the resulting free kick to give Bristol City the lead. Both Rob Newman and Neville went close to doubling the lead but the half ended with Bristol City leading 1–0.

Walsall equalised in the 62nd minute: Forbes' header from a Mark Goodwin corner was cleared off the Bristol City goalline and Christie bundled in the rebound. Joe Jordan, Bristol City's player-manager, substituted himself on for Neville two minutes later, and soon after saw his shot pass a foot wide of the Walsall goalpost. With ten minutes remaining, a Peter Hart free kick was headed on by Christie to Kelly who scored to give Bristol City the lead. In the final minute of the match, Barber's goal kick found Kelly in Bristol City's half of the pitch who ran with the ball and shot from around 20 yards (18 m), past Waugh in the goal to score and make the final score 3–1.

==== Details ====
| 25 May 1988 | Bristol City | 1–3 | Walsall | Ashton Gate, Bristol |
| 19:45 UTC | Walsh 38' | | Christie 62'; Kelly 79', 90' | Attendance: 25,128; Referee: Joe Worrall |

| 1 | Keith Waugh |
| 2 | Andy Llewellyn |
| 3 | Rob Newman |
| 4 | Glenn Humphries |
| 5 | John Pender |
| 6 | Steve McClaren |
| 7 | Ralph Milne |
| 8 | Steve Galliers |
| 9 | Carl Shutt |
| 10 | Alan Walsh |
| 11 | Steve Neville (substituted off) 64' |
Substitutes used:
| 12 | Joe Jordan (substituted on) 64' |
Manager:
Joe Jordan

| 1 | Fred Barber |
| 2 | Mark Taylor |
| 3 | Richard O'Kelly (substituted off) 45' |
| 4 | Craig Shakespeare |
| 5 | Graeme Forbes |
| 6 | Mark Goodwin |
| 7 | Phil Hawker |
| 8 | Peter Hart |
| 9 | Trevor Christie |
| 10 | David Kelly |
| 11 | Willie Naughton |
Substitutes used:
| 12 | Mark Jones (substituted on) 45' |
Manager:
Tommy Coakley

=== Second leg ===
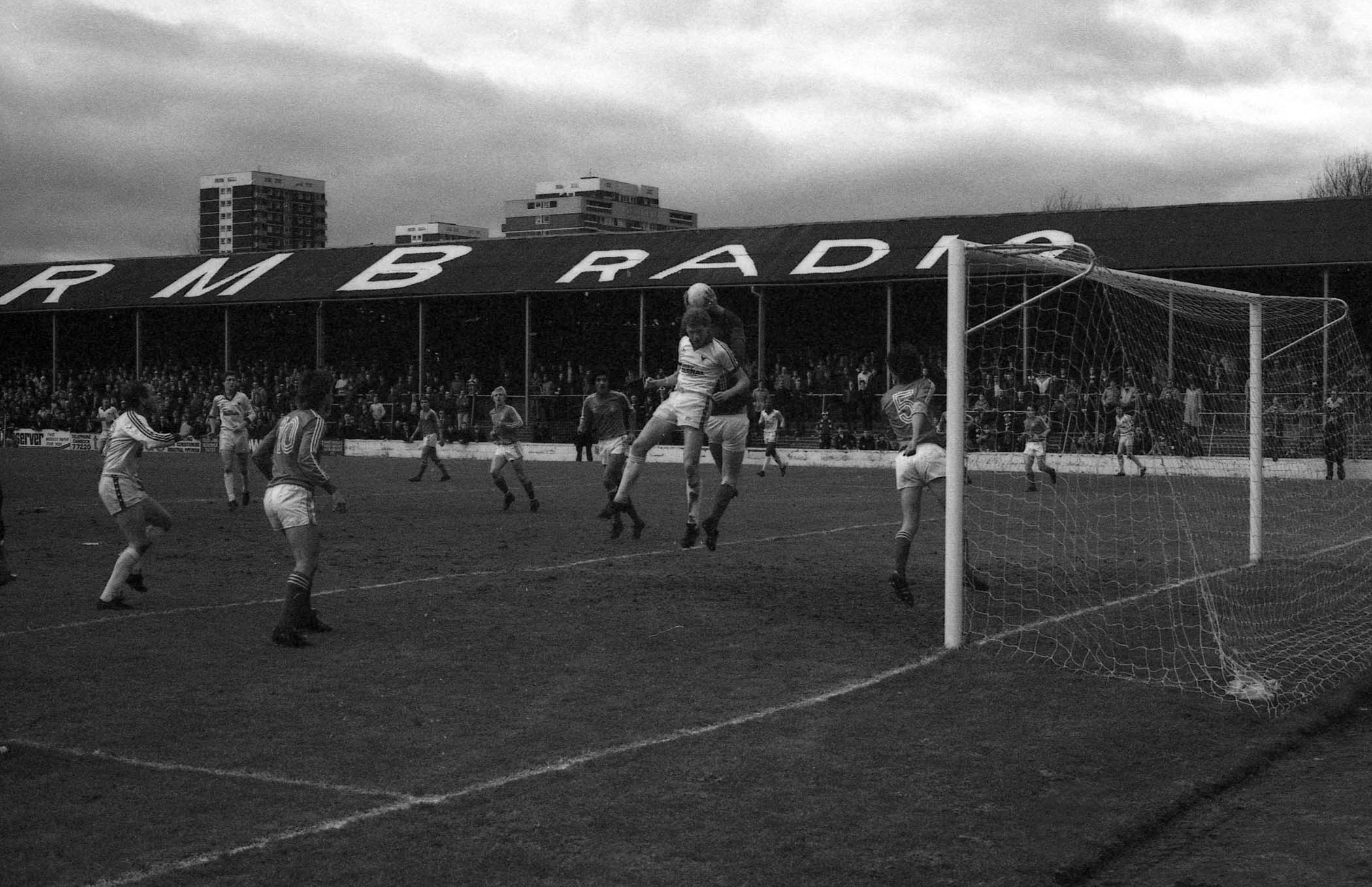
Fellows Park (pictured in 1982) hosted the second leg and the subsequent replay.

==== Summary ====
O'Kelly was unavailable for Walsall for the match having pulled a calf muscle in the first leg. The second leg of the final kicked off at 3 p.m. on 28 May 1988 at Fellows Park in front of 13,941 spectators and was refereed by George Tyson. Bristol City started the stronger of the sides and Barber punched a shot away from Ralph Milne in the third minute. An early strike from Walsh hit the Walsall goalpost, a shot from Shutt went close and Walsh's 25 yards (23 m) free kick also narrowly missed the target. In the 31st minute, Walsh played in a corner which Newman headed into the Walsall goal and although Craig Shakespeare hooked the ball out from under the crossbar, the linesman adjudged that the ball has crossed the goalline.

Cynthia Bateman, writing in The Guardian suggested that the "strong, swirling wind was not altogether responsible for some pretty awful football". Shakespeare and Kelly had both come close to equalising, but midway through the second half, McClaren crossed for Shutt to shoot past Barber to make it 2–0 and level the aggregate score at 3–3. In the 76th minute Forbes saw his header cleared off the Bristol City goalline by Steve Galliers. With no outright winner after 90 minutes, a penalty shootout was used to determine which side would host the replay: Walsall won 4–2 and earned the right to play the deciding match at Fellows Park.

==== Details ====
| 28 May 1988 | Walsall | 0–2 | Bristol City | Fellows Park, Walsall |
| 15:00 UTC | | | Newman 31'; Shutt 65' | Attendance: 13,941; Referee: George Tyson |

| 1 | Fred Barber |
| 2 | Mark Taylor |
| 3 | Andy Dornan |
| 4 | Craig Shakespeare |
| 5 | Graeme Forbes |
| 6 | Mark Goodwin |
| 7 | Phil Hawker |
| 8 | Peter Hart |
| 9 | Trevor Christie |
| 10 | David Kelly |
| 11 | Willie Naughton |
Manager:
Tommy Coakley

| 1 | Keith Waugh |
| 2 | Andy Llewellyn |
| 3 | Rob Newman |
| 4 | Glenn Humphries |
| 5 | John Pender |
| 6 | Steve McClaren |
| 7 | Ralph Milne |
| 8 | Steve Galliers |
| 9 | Carl Shutt (substituted off) 85' |
| 10 | Alan Walsh |
| 11 | Joe Jordan |
Substitutes used:
| 12 | Tony Caldwell (substituted on) 85' |
Manager:
Joe Jordan

=== Replay ===
==== Summary ====
The replay of the final kicked off at 3 p.m. on 30 May 1988 at Fellows Park in front of 13,007 spectators and refereed by George Courtney. Walsall took the lead in the 11th minute: Bristol City's John Pender had tackled Shakespeare but failed to clear the ball which Kelly won and struck past Waugh. Six minutes later, Kelly ran onto a through-ball from Goodwin and scored his second goal. Within minutes, Walsall were 3–0 ahead: Goodwin's corner was headed into the Bristol City net by Phil Hawker. Willie Naughton's diving header just before half-time went wide for Walsall and the half ended without further scoring.

Although the second half started with Bristol City winning a series of corners, it was Walsall who scored. Kelly beat Galliers and struck the ball which took a deflection off Humphries before spinning round Waugh and ending in the Bristol City goal off the goalpost, to complete Kelly's hat-trick. Towards the end of the match, Shutt was sent off for a foul on Barber and the match ended 4–0 to Walsall who secured promotion to the Second Division.

==== Details ====
| 30 May 1988 | Walsall | 4–0 | Bristol City | Fellows Park, Walsall |
| 15:00 UTC | Kelly 11', 17', 64'; Hawker 19' | | | Attendance: 13,007; Referee: George Courtney |

| 1 | Fred Barber |
| 2 | Mark Taylor |
| 3 | Andy Dornan (substituted off) |
| 4 | Craig Shakespeare |
| 5 | Graeme Forbes |
| 6 | Mark Goodwin (substituted off) |
| 7 | Phil Hawker |
| 8 | Peter Hart |
| 9 | Trevor Christie |
| 10 | David Kelly |
| 11 | Willie Naughton |
Substitutes:
| 12 | Mark Jones (substituted on) |
| 13 | Paul Sanderson (substituted on) |
Manager:
Tommy Coakley

| 1 | Keith Waugh |
| 2 | Andy Llewellyn |
| 3 | Rob Newman |
| 4 | Glenn Humphries |
| 5 | John Pender |
| 6 | Steve McClaren |
| 7 | Ralph Milne |
| 8 | Steve Galliers |
| 9 | Carl Shutt (red card) |
| 10 | Alan Walsh |
| 11 | Joe Jordan |
Manager:
Joe Jordan

== Post-match ==
Kelly was sold by Walsall to West Ham United in July 1988 for a fee of £600,000. Walsall's manager Tommy Coakley was sacked in December 1988 after a losing streak of eleven games, culminating in a 5–1 Boxing Day defeat at home to Oxford United which sent Walsall to the bottom of the league. He was replaced the following January by John Barnwell, but Walsall ended their following season in last position in the Second Division and were relegated back to the Third Division. Bristol City's next season saw them finish in 11th position in the Third Division, five places and nine points outside the play-offs.

== Sources ==
- Foster, Richard (2015). The Agony & The Ecstasy. Ockley Books. ISBN 978-1-9109-0600-2.
