= Richard O'Kelly =

English footballer and manager (born 1957)

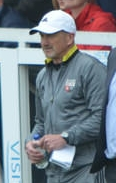
- O'Kelly while Brentford assistant coach in 2017.

Personal information
- Full name: Richard Florence O'Kelly
- Date of birth: 8 January 1957 (age 69)
- Place of birth: West Bromwich, England
- Height: 5 ft 10 in (1.78 m)
- Position: Forward

Youth career
- Alvechurch

Senior career*
Years	Team	Apps	(Gls)
1979–1986	Walsall	204	(56)
1986–1988	Port Vale	28	(4)
1988	Walsall	12	(1)
1988–1989	Grimsby Town	39	(10)
Total		283	(71)

Managerial career
- 2012: Hereford United
- * Club domestic league appearances and goals

Richard Florence O'Kelly (born 8 January 1957) is an English former footballer turned manager.

He began his career at Walsall in 1979, as they won promotion into the Third Division in 1979–80, where they remained for his next six seasons at Fellows Park. During that time, he scored 56 goals in 204 league games. He was sold to Port Vale for a £6,000 fee in July 1986, before returning to Walsall on a free transfer January 1988. Helping the "Saddlers" to win promotion via the play-offs, he moved on to Grimsby Town before retiring due to injury the following year.

After retiring due to injury in 1989, he took up coaching and has served as the assistant manager at Hereford United, Bournemouth, and Doncaster Rovers. He became a manager for the first time with Hereford United in March 2012 but quit the post two months later after the "Bulls" were relegated out of the Football League. He immediately returned to the number two role at former club Walsall before following manager Dean Smith to Brentford in November 2015.

== Playing career ==
=== Walsall ===
O'Kelly started his career with Alvechurch before moving into the English Football League with Walsall in 1979 after being signed by manager Alan Buckley. The "Saddlers" were promoted into the Third Division as Fourth Division as runners-up in 1979–80, two points behind champions Huddersfield Town. Walsall retained their third-tier status in 1980–81 by finishing one place and one point above the drop zone. They came even closer to relegation in 1981–82, finishing ahead of relegated Wimbledon on goal difference. They then improved, finishing tenth in 1982–83, before finishing sixth in 1983–84, eight points behind promoted Sheffield United. However, Walsall dropped to eleventh in 1984–85, and O'Kelly was the club's top scorer with 18 goals. They finished sixth in 1985–86, nine points behind promoted Derby County. In his seven years at Fellows Park, he made over 200 appearances, with a goal rate of one goal every four games.

=== Port Vale ===
In July 1986, the cultured striker joined fellow West Midlands and Third Division side Port Vale for a £6,000 fee. His Vale Park career started with a bang as he scored on his debut in a 2–2 draw at Middlesbrough on 23 August 1986. After playing the next three matches, he was struck down with an injury to his knee ligaments, which required an operation the following January. Sidelined for the rest of the 1986–87 season, he returned to the first-team at the beginning of the 1987–88 season, and scored three goals in 22 appearances.

=== Return to Walsall ===
In January 1988, John Rudge allowed him to return to Walsall on a free transfer. The club won promotion at the end of the 1987 season under Tommy Coakley's stewardship, beating Bristol City 4–0 in the play-off final. He then joined former manager Alan Buckley at Fourth Division Grimsby Town, as the "Mariners" posted a ninth-place finish in 1988–89; O'Kelly finished his playing career in 1989 following a bad injury sustained playing for Grimsby in an encounter with Doncaster Rovers.

== Management career ==
=== Coaching ===
After finishing his playing career, O'Kelly worked as Port Vale's community officer from August 1990 to May 1991 before returning to Blundell Park as a youth team coach. He left Grimsby for the same position at West Bromwich Albion in 1994. He spent seven years at The Hawthorns as a youth team coach and then six months at Aston Villa before joining Hereford United in 2002 as assistant manager to Graham Turner.

He was appointed assistant manager of Bournemouth in the summer of 2004 and two years later followed manager Sean O'Driscoll to Doncaster Rovers. Under the pair's first full season at Rovers, the club gained promotion into the Championship after winning the League One play-off final in 2008 against Leeds United. The pair were placed on 'gardening leave' by the club in September 2011, with Rovers sitting bottom of the Championship.

In November 2011 he announced his return to Walsall, coaching for the club voluntarily.

=== Hereford United ===
On 5 March 2012, O'Kelly was appointed manager of Hereford United, replacing Jamie Pitman, who stayed on at Edgar Street as a coach. He took charge with the club two places and two points above the League Two relegation zone and signed a contract until the end of the 2011–12 season. He got his first point in charge at the club the following day, when his side squandered a two-goal lead to draw 2–2 with Macclesfield Town at Moss Rose. Four days later they beat Morecambe 1–0 at the Globe Arena, further boosting their chances of survival. He later signed full-back James Chambers and winger James Baxendale on loan from Doncaster Rovers. To avoid relegation on the last day of the campaign, the "Bulls" needed to beat Torquay United and hope Burton Albion could avoid defeat at home to Barnet. Chairman David Keyte said that he should have appointed O'Kelly earlier in the season. His team won a futile 3–2 victory, as a win for Barnet sent Hereford back down to the Conference. He was asked to remain in charge for the subsequent Conference campaign, but declined the offer.

=== Return to coaching ===
In June 2012, Dean Smith appointed O'Kelly as his assistant manager at League One side Walsall. In accepting the job he turned down Sean O'Driscoll's offer to join the coaching staff at Crawley Town. However, he went on to quit Walsall for Championship side Bristol City in January 2013, after O'Driscoll was appointed as the "Robins" new manager. Four months later he resigned, citing personal reasons. He made an immediate return to Walsall to once again work as Dean Smith's assistant.

Once Smith was appointed as manager of Championship side Brentford in November 2015, he immediately named O'Kelly as his assistant.

O'Kelly followed Smith to Aston Villa in October 2018. The "Villans" went on to win promotion to the Premier League with a 2–1 victory over Derby County in the 2019 EFL Championship play-off final. On 12 August 2021, Aston Villa announced O'Kelly's decision to leave his role there.

== Career statistics ==
=== Playing statistics ===
Appearances and goals by club, season and competition
Club	Season	League			FA Cup		Other^{[A]}		Total	
Club	Season	Division	Apps	Goals	Apps	Goals	Apps	Goals	Apps	Goals
Walsall	1980–81	Third Division	38	7	1	0	2	0	41	7
Walsall	1981–82	Third Division	29	6	2	0	0	0	31	6
Walsall	1982–83	Third Division	35	8	3	0	0	0	38	8
Walsall	1983–84	Third Division	40	12	1	0	9	3	50	15
Walsall	1984–85	Third Division	34	16	1	0	8	2	43	18
Walsall	1985–86	Third Division	28	7	3	2	4	1	35	10
Walsall	Total		204	56	11	2	23	6	238	64
Port Vale	1986–87	Third Division	12	3	1	0	2	2	15	5
Port Vale	1987–88	Third Division	16	1	3	1	3	1	22	3
Port Vale	Total		28	4	4	1	5	3	37	8
Walsall	1987–88	Third Division	12	1	0	0	3	0	15	1
Grimsby Town	1988–89	Fourth Division	39	10	6	0	5	0	50	10
Career total			283	71	21	3	36	9	340	83

A. The "Other" column constitutes appearances and goals in the League Cup, Football League Trophy, Football League play-offs and Full Members Cup.

=== Managerial statistics ===
Managerial record by team and tenure
Team	From	To	Record				
Team	From	To	G	W	D	L	Win %
Hereford United	5 March 2012	11 May 2012	12	3	4	5	25.00

== Honours ==
Walsall

- Football League Fourth Division second-place promotion: 1979–80
- Football League Third Division play-offs: 1988
