= EFL League One play-offs =

Annual postseason elimination tournament of English Football League

- Sport: Football
- Founded: 1987
- No. of teams: 4
- Region: England; Wales
- Broadcasters: United Kingdom: Sky Sports; International: Varies by territory
- Streaming partners: United Kingdom: Sky Go; NOW TV; International: Varies by region

The EFL League One play-offs are a series of play-off matches contested by the association football teams finishing from third to sixth in the EFL League One table and are part of the EFL playoffs. As of 2022, the play-offs comprise two semi-finals, where the team finishing third plays the team finishing sixth, and the team finishing fourth plays the team finishing fifth, each conducted as a two-legged tie. The winners of the semi-finals progress to the final which is contested at Wembley Stadium. The winner of the Final is promoted to the Championship league.

For the first three years, the play-off final took place over two legs, played at both side's grounds. Swindon Town won the first Third Division play-off final in 1987, requiring a replay to defeat Gillingham. From 1990, the play-off final was a one-off match, hosted at the original Wembley Stadium, while from 2001 to 2006, the final was played at the Millennium Stadium in Cardiff as Wembley was being rebuilt. Since 2007, the match has been hosted at Wembley Stadium except for the 2011 final which took place at Old Trafford to avoid a clash with the 2011 UEFA Champions League final.

When the third tier play-offs were first contested in 1987, they were known as the Football League Third Division play-offs. From 1993 to 2004, following the creation of the FA Premier League as a breakaway from the Football League, the competition became known as the Second Division play-offs, and since 2005 has taken its current name as the League One play-offs following a rebranding of the remaining three divisions of the Football League.

== Format ==
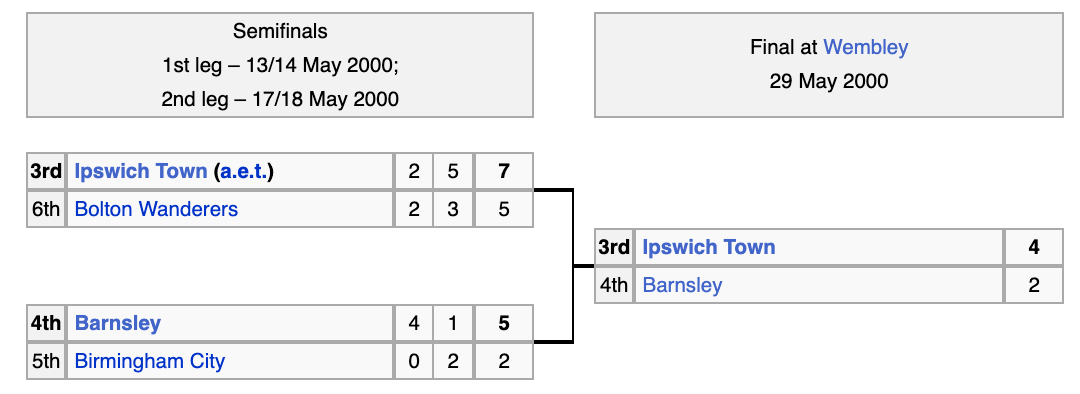
An example of the play-off format, from the 2000 First Division play-offs

As of 2021, the League One play-offs involve the four teams that finish directly below the automatic promotion places in EFL League One, the third tier of the English football league system. These teams meet in a series of play-off matches to determine the final team that will be promoted to the EFL Championship. Based on the ranking, the team finishing in third place plays the sixth-placed team, while the team in fourth plays the fifth-placed team in the "play-off semi-finals". Two ties are played over two legs, with the higher-ranked side hosting the second leg. According to the EFL, "this is designed to give the highest finishing team an advantage".

The winner of each semi-final is determined by the aggregate score across the two legs, with the number of goals scored in each match of the tie being added together. The team with the higher aggregate score qualifies for the final. If, at the end of the regular 90 minutes of the second leg, the aggregate score is level then the match goes into extra time where two 15-minute halves are played. If the score remains level at the end of extra time, the tie is decided by a penalty shootout. The away goals rule does not apply in the play-off semi-finals.

In 2022, VAR (virtual assistance referee) was available to be used, for the first time, in the play-off final between Wycombe Wanderers and Sunderland.

The clubs that win the semi-finals then meet at Wembley Stadium, a neutral venue, for a one-off match referred to as the "play-off final". If required, extra time and a penalty shootout can be employed in the same manner as for the semi-finals to determine the winner. The runner-up and losing semi-finalists remain in League One while the winning side is promoted. The match, along with the finals of the Championship and League Two play-offs, usually takes place over the long weekend of the second bank holiday in May.

== Background ==
The mid-1980s saw a decline in attendances at football matches and public disenchantment with English football. A number of instances of violence and tragedy struck the game. In March 1985 at the semi-final of the 1984–85 Football League Cup between Chelsea and Sunderland where more than 100 people were arrested after various invasions of the Stamford Bridge pitch and more than 40 people, including 20 policemen, were injured. Nine days later, violence flared at the FA Cup match between Millwall and Luton Town: seats were used as missiles against the police and resulted in Luton Town banning away supporters. On 11 May, 56 people were killed and 265 injured in the Bradford City stadium fire and less than three weeks later, 39 supporters died and more than 600 were injured in the Heysel Stadium disaster where Liverpool were playing Juventus in the European Cup final.

Initially the Play-Offs would operate for two years, but if they proved popular with spectators they could become a permanent part of the calendar.

— Heathrow Agreement

In an attempt to persuade fans to return to the stadia, the Football League had rejected a £19 million television deal to broadcast matches live on the BBC and ITV before the 1985–86 Football League season with League president Jack Dunnett suggesting that "football is prepared to have a year or two with no television".In December 1985, the "Heathrow Agreement" was agreed which aimed to revitalise the financial affairs of the league. It was a ten-point plan which included a structural reorganisation of the league, reducing the top tier from 22 clubs to 20, and the introduction of play-offs to facilitate the change. The play-offs were introduced to the end of the 1986–87 Football League season. They were initially introduced for two years but with the proviso that if they were successful with the general public, they would be retained permanently.

== History ==
In the first two seasons, the team one place above the relegation zone in the Second Division, along with the three clubs below the automatic promotion positions in the Third Division, took part in the play-offs. In the inaugural play-offs, Second Division Sunderland were eliminated in the semi-finals by Third Division side Gillingham and suffered relegation to the third tier of English football for the first time in their history. In the final, Gillingham faced Second Division Swindon Town but they could not be separated over the two home-and-away legs, so the tie was settled in a replay. Played at a neutral ground, Crystal Palace's stadium Selhurst Park in Croydon, Swindon Town won the game 2–0 to gain promotion to the First Division, while Gillingham remained in the Second Division. A replay was also required the following season when Walsall and Bristol City ended their two-legged final 3–3 on aggregate. A penalty shootout was used to determine which side would host the replay, which Walsall won. Played at Fellows Park two days after the second leg took place there, the match ended 4–0 to Walsall who were promoted.

EFL League One play-off nomenclature
| Years | Name |
|---|---|
| 1987–1992 | Football League Third Division play-offs |
| 1993–2004 | Football League Second Division play-offs |
| 2005–2015 | Football League One play-offs |
| 2016–present | EFL League One play-offs |

The primary objective of the play-offs was achieved within the first two seasons, namely the reorganisation of the four leagues with 20 clubs in the first tier and 24 in the second to fourth tiers. However, the popularity of the play-offs was such that the post-season games were retained and the play-offs were the first to feature four teams from the Third Division: Port Vale defeated Bristol Rovers over two legs in the 1989 Football League Third Division play-off final. From 1990, the format of the final changed to a single match played at a neutral venue, initially the original Wembley Stadium. The first winners of the inaugural one-off final were Notts County who beat Tranmere Rovers 2–0 in front of 29,252 spectators.

Wembley Stadium was demolished early in the 21st century to make way for a brand new stadium. The 2000 Second Division final was the last third-tier final to be hosted beneath the Twin Towers. For the next six years, the finals were hosted at the Millennium Stadium in Cardiff, where Walsall needed extra time to beat Reading 3–2 in the final watched by a crowd of 50,496. The play-off finals returned to the new Wembley Stadium in 2007. The first such final saw Blackpool defeat Yeovil Town 2–0.

The League One play-off final was relocated to Old Trafford for a single season as a result of a scheduling clash with the 2011 UEFA Champions League Final. The 2020 final was played behind closed doors as a result of the COVID-19 pandemic in the United Kingdom. Wycombe Wanderers beat Oxford United to reach the second-tier for the first time in their history. The official attendance was 0.

Since the first play-off final, the third tier of English football's league itself has undergone a number of re-brands. In 1993, the Premier League was formed, a move which caused the third-tier league to be renamed as the Second Division. In 2004, the Second Division was re-branded as Football League One, before the League's adoption of English Football League (EFL) led to a 2016 renaming as the EFL League One.

== Prize ==
The financial value of winning the EFL League One play-off is derived from the additional remuneration clubs receive in the Championship. As of 2018 clubs in the third tier receive around £1.4 million, comprising a "basic award" and a "solidarity" payment, the latter of which is funded by the Premier League. In the second tier, the total funding rises to a total of around £7 million, a fivefold increase in revenue. The winners of the final receive a trophy.

== Winners and semi-finalists ==
Key to list of winners and semi-finalists
| Year | Link to play-off article for specified year |
| Venue | Location(s) of the final match(es) |
| Winner (X) | Team that won play-off final, (X) indicates cumulative number of play-off final victories |
| Final | Link to play-off final article for the specified match |
| ^ | Final played over one leg |
| R | Final decided by a replay |
| † | Final decided in extra time |
| ‡ | Final decided by a penalty shoot-out |
| Runner-up | Team that lost play-off final |
| Semi-finalists | Two teams that lost in play-off semi-finals |

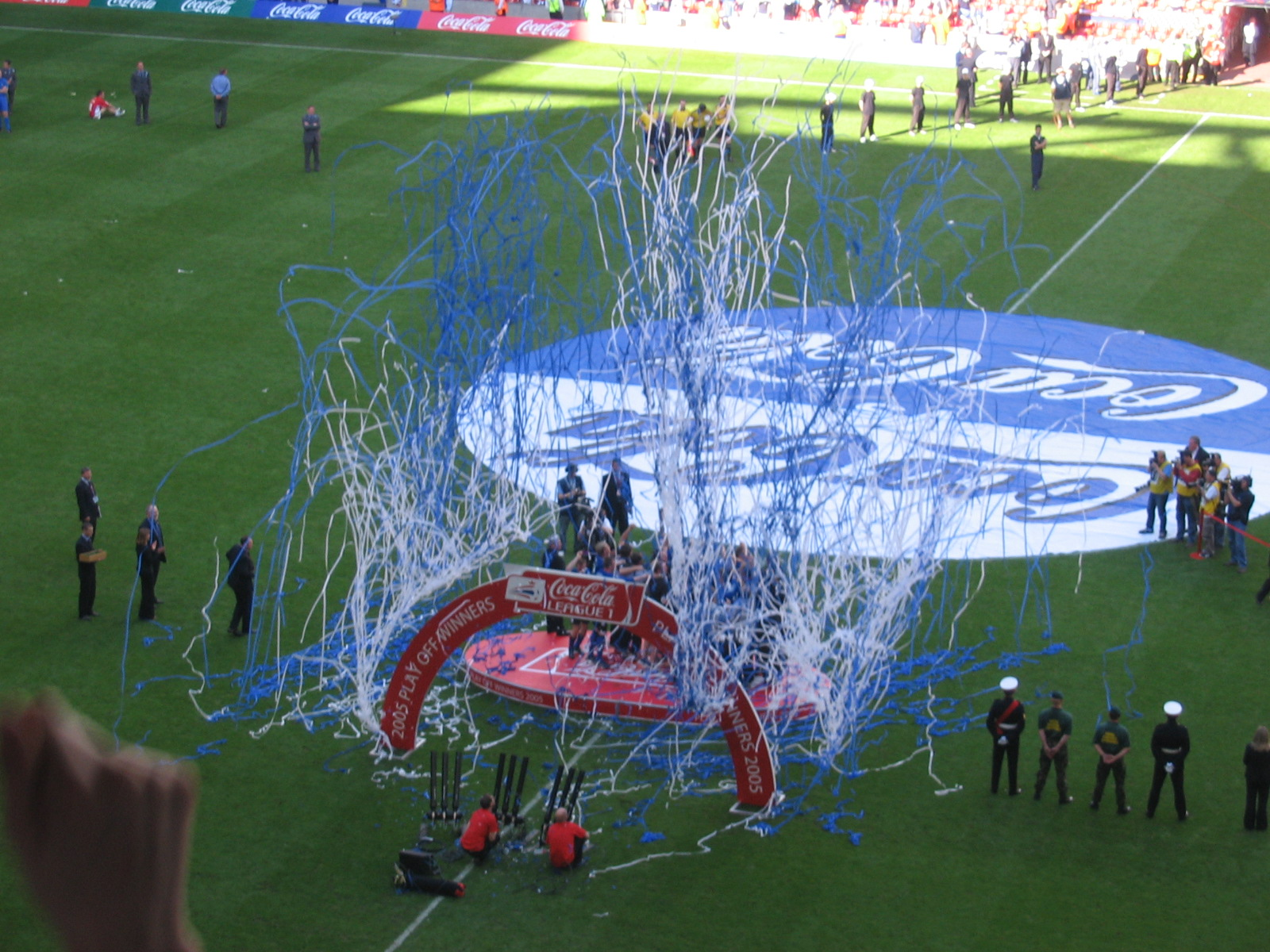
Sheffield Wednesday celebrating victory in the 2005 Football League One play-off final at the Millennium Stadium

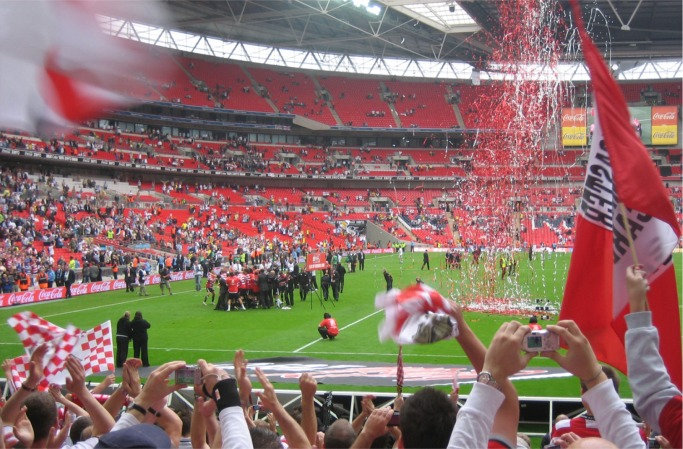
The 2008 Football League One play-off final at Wembley Stadium was won by Doncaster Rovers.

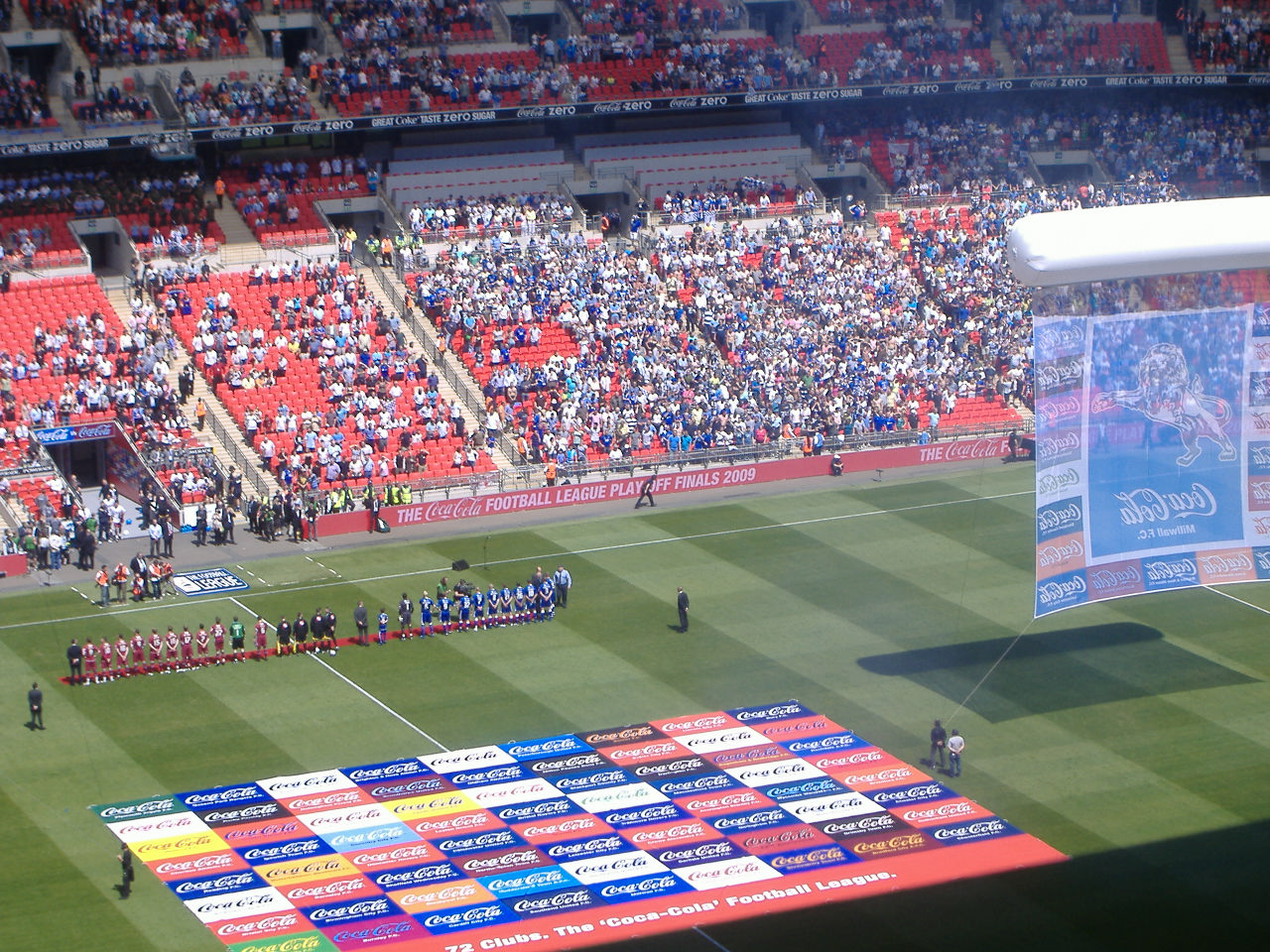
Scunthorpe United and Millwall players line up before the 2009 Football League One play-off final at Wembley Stadium.

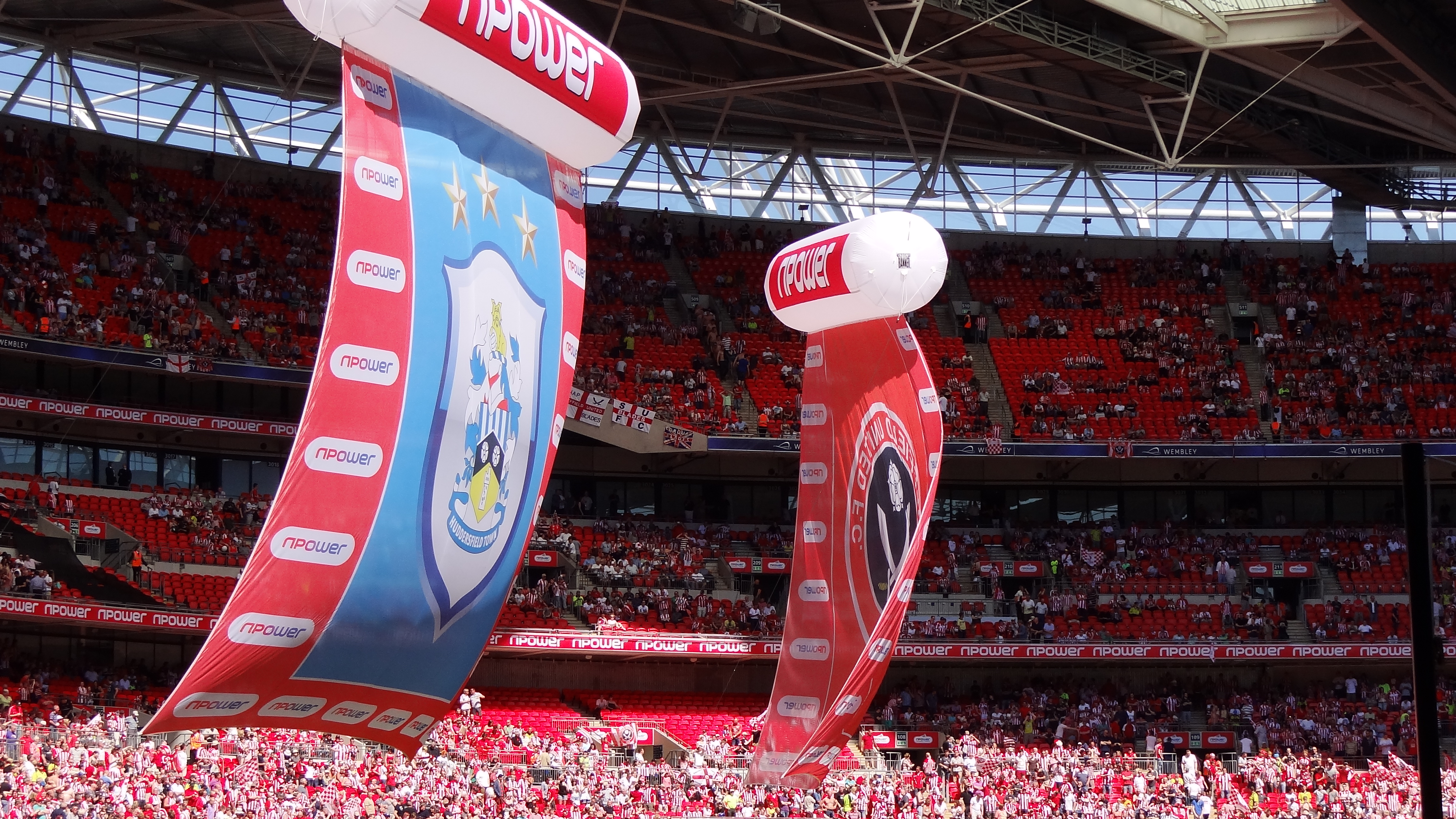
Huddersfield Town and Sheffield United flags flying before the 2012 Football League One play-off final

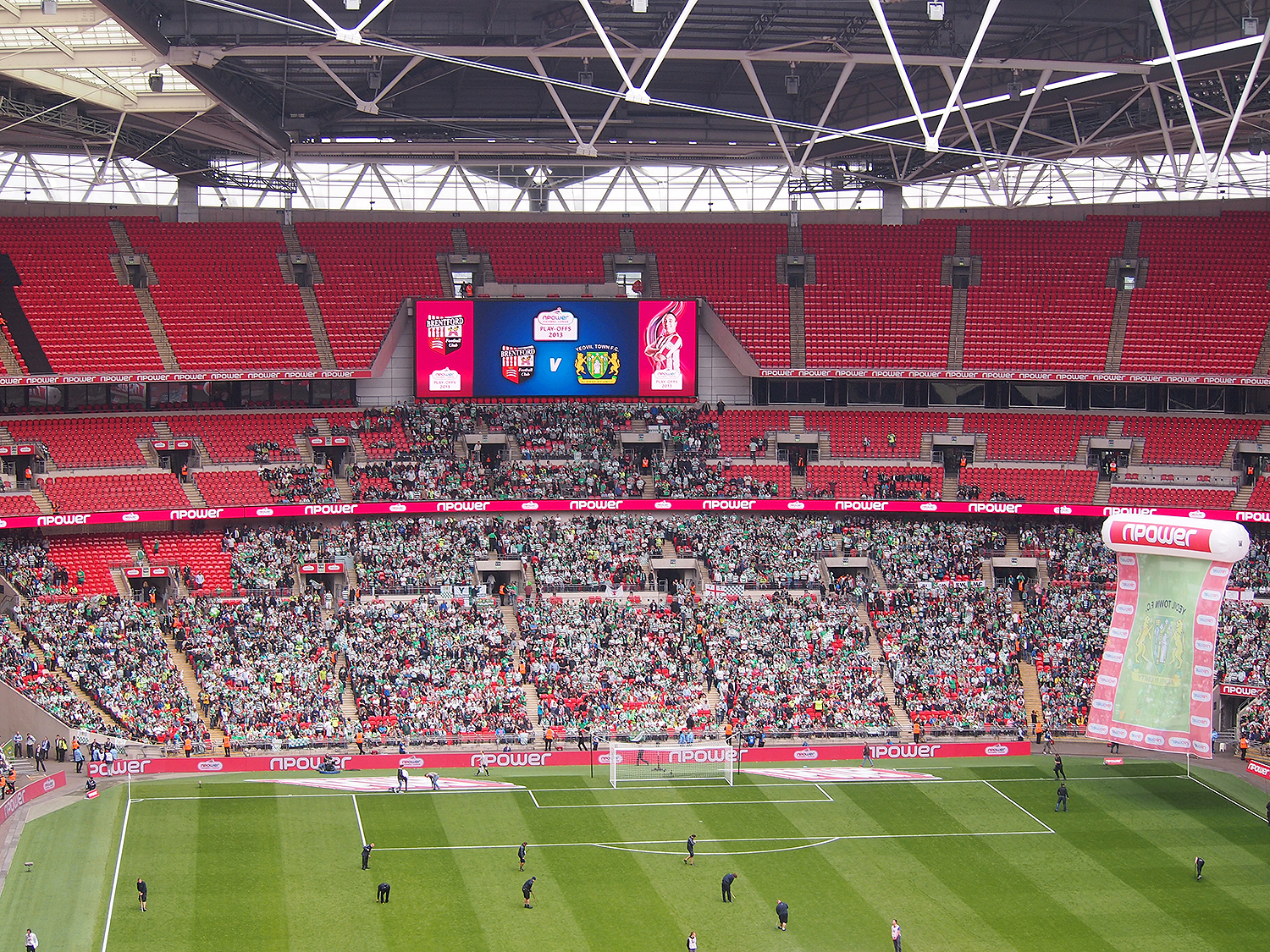
Yeovil Town supporters at Wembley before the 2013 Football League One play-off final

Winners of the EFL League One play-offs along with runners-up and semi-finalists
| Year | Venue | Winner | Final | Runner-up | Semi-finalists | Ref. |
|---|---|---|---|---|---|---|
| 1987 | Priestfield Stadium/County Ground ^ | Swindon Town (1) | 2–2 | Gillingham | Sunderland; Wigan Athletic | |
| 1987 (R) | Selhurst Park | Swindon Town (1) | 2–0 | Gillingham | Sunderland; Wigan Athletic | |
| 1988 | Ashton Gate/Fellows Park ^ | Walsall (1) | 3–3 | Bristol City | Notts County; Sheffield United | |
| 1988 (R) | Fellows Park | Walsall (1) | 4–0 | Bristol City | Notts County; Sheffield United | |
| 1989 | Twerton Park/Vale Park ^ | Port Vale (1) | 2–1 | Bristol Rovers | Fulham; Preston North End | |
| 1990 | Wembley Stadium (original) | Notts County (1) | 2–0 | Tranmere Rovers | Bolton Wanderers; Bury | |
| 1991 | Wembley Stadium (original) | Tranmere Rovers (1) | 1–0 | Bolton Wanderers | Brentford; Bury | |
| 1992 | Wembley Stadium (original) | Peterborough United (1) | 2–1 | Stockport County | Huddersfield Town; Stoke City | |
| 1993 | Wembley Stadium (original) | West Bromwich Albion (1) | 3–0 | Port Vale | Stockport County; Swansea City | |
| 1994 | Wembley Stadium (original) | Burnley (1) | 2–1 | Stockport County | Plymouth Argyle; York City | |
| 1995 | Wembley Stadium (original) | Huddersfield Town (1) | 2–1 | Bristol Rovers | Brentford; Crewe Alexandra | |
| 1996 | Wembley Stadium (original) | Bradford City (1) | 2–0 | Notts County | Blackpool; Crewe Alexandra | |
| 1997 | Wembley Stadium (original) | Crewe Alexandra (1) | 1–0 | Brentford | Bristol City; Luton Town | |
| 1998 | Wembley Stadium (original) | Grimsby Town (1) | 1–0 | Northampton Town | Bristol Rovers; Fulham | |
| 1999 | Wembley Stadium (original) | Manchester City (1) | 2–2 ‡ (Note: Manchester City won the 1999 Football League Second Division play-off final with a 3–1 penalty shoot-out victory over Gillingham.) | Gillingham | Preston North End; Wigan Athletic | |
| 2000 | Wembley Stadium (original) | Gillingham (1) | 3–2 † | Wigan Athletic | Millwall; Stoke City | |
| 2001 | Millennium Stadium | Walsall (2) | 3–2 † | Reading | Stoke City; Wigan Athletic | |
| 2002 | Millennium Stadium | Stoke City (1) | 2–0 | Brentford | Cardiff City; Huddersfield Town | |
| 2003 | Millennium Stadium | Cardiff City (1) | 1–0 † | Queens Park Rangers | Bristol City; Oldham Athletic | |
| 2004 | Millennium Stadium | Brighton & Hove Albion (1) | 1–0 | Bristol City | Hartlepool United; Swindon Town | |
| 2005 | Millennium Stadium | Sheffield Wednesday (1) | 4–2 † | Hartlepool United | Brentford; Tranmere Rovers | |
| 2006 | Millennium Stadium | Barnsley (1) | 2–2 ‡ (Note: Barnsley won the 2006 Football League One play-off final with a 4–3 penalty shoot-out victory over Swansea City.) | Swansea City | Brentford; Huddersfield Town | |
| 2007 | Wembley Stadium | Blackpool (1) | 2–0 | Yeovil Town | Nottingham Forest; Oldham Athletic | |
| 2008 | Wembley Stadium | Doncaster Rovers (1) | 1–0 | Leeds United | Carlisle United; Southend United | |
| 2009 | Wembley Stadium | Scunthorpe United (1) | 3–2 | Millwall | Leeds United; Milton Keynes Dons | |
| 2010 | Wembley Stadium | Millwall (1) | 1–0 | Swindon Town | Charlton Athletic; Huddersfield Town | |
| 2011 | Old Trafford | Peterborough United (2) | 3–0 | Huddersfield Town | Bournemouth; Milton Keynes Dons | |
| 2012 | Wembley Stadium | Huddersfield Town (2) | 0–0 ‡ (Note: Huddersfield won the 2012 Football League One play-off final with an 8–7 penalty shoot-out victory over Sheffield United.) | Sheffield United | Milton Keynes Dons; Stevenage | |
| 2013 | Wembley Stadium | Yeovil Town (1) | 2–1 | Brentford | Sheffield United; Swindon Town | |
| 2014 | Wembley Stadium | Rotherham United (1) | 2–2 ‡ (Note: Rotherham United won the 2014 Football League One play-off final with a 4–3 penalty shoot-out victory over Leyton Orient.) | Leyton Orient | Peterborough United; Preston North End | |
| 2015 | Wembley Stadium | Preston North End (1) | 4–0 | Swindon Town | Chesterfield; Sheffield United | |
| 2016 | Wembley Stadium | Barnsley (2) | 3–1 | Millwall | Bradford City; Walsall | |
| 2017 | Wembley Stadium | Millwall (2) | 1–0 | Bradford City | Fleetwood Town; Scunthorpe United | |
| 2018 | Wembley Stadium | Rotherham United (2) | 2–1 † | Shrewsbury Town | Charlton Athletic; Scunthorpe United | |
| 2019 | Wembley Stadium | Charlton Athletic (1) | 2–1 | Sunderland | Doncaster Rovers; Portsmouth | |
| 2020 | Wembley Stadium | Wycombe Wanderers (1) | 2–1 | Oxford United | Fleetwood Town; Portsmouth | |
| 2021 | Wembley Stadium | Blackpool (2) | 2–1 | Lincoln City | Oxford United; Sunderland | |
| 2022 | Wembley Stadium | Sunderland (1) | 2–0 | Wycombe Wanderers | Milton Keynes Dons; Sheffield Wednesday | |
| 2023 | Wembley Stadium | Sheffield Wednesday (2) | 1–0 † | Barnsley | Peterborough United; Bolton Wanderers | |
| 2024 | Wembley Stadium | Oxford United (1) | 2–0 | Bolton Wanderers | Barnsley; Peterborough United | |
| 2025 | Wembley Stadium | Charlton Athletic (2) | 1–0 | Leyton Orient | Wycombe Wanderers; Stockport County | |
| 2026 | Wembley Stadium | Bolton Wanderers (1) | 4–1 | Stockport County | Stevenage; Bradford City | |

== Records ==
Nine clubs have secured promotion from the third tier of English football through the play-off final twice, Walsall becoming the first to do so in 2001 and most recently Charlton Athletic who beat Leyton Orient in the 2025 final. Brentford have failed to be promoted via the play-offs on seven occasions. Along with Bristol City, they have lost in the final three times.
