= Graeme Forbes =

Graeme Forbes is the name of:

- Graeme Forbes (philosopher), American philosopher
- Graeme Forbes (footballer) (born 1958), Scottish footballer

== See also ==
- Graham Forbes, Scottish priest
