= Yokley =

Yokley is a surname. Notable people with the surname include:

- Darryl Yokley (born 1982), American tenor and alto saxophonist, composer, and music conservatory teacher
- Eddie Yokley (born 1952), American politician

== See also ==
- Cokley
