= Mark Jones (footballer, born 1968) =

English footballer

Personal information
- Date of birth: 4 January 1968 (age 58)
- Place of birth: Brownhill, England
- Height: 5 ft 8 in (1.73 m)
- Position: Midfielder

Senior career*
Years	Team	Apps	(Gls)
1987–1989	Walsall	8	(0)
1989	→ Exeter City (loan)	5	(0)
1989–1990	Hereford United	42	(8)
- Hednesford Town
Total		55	(8)
- * Club domestic league appearances and goals

Mark Jones (born 4 January 1968) is an English former footballer who played as a midfielder in the Football League for Walsall, Exeter City and Hereford United during the 1980s.

== Honours ==
Walsall

- Football League Third Division play-offs: 1988
