= David Emmanuel Noel =

English painter (born 1972)

- Born: 12 December 1972 (age 53); London, U.K.
- Known for: Painting, illustrations
- Notable work: Pictures at an African Exhibition
- Website: davidemmanuelnoel.com

David Emmanuel Noel (born 12 December 1972) is a London-born painter, illustrator and designer with a career that includes working on art projects with local government bodies and charitable organizations such as the CAMBA, and the NSPCC. A Fellow of the Royal Society of Arts, he has worked extensively with health professionals, architects, designers, and professional institutes, including the Royal Institute of British Architects, championing design quality and therapeutic benefits of art in public spaces. He was a director of the Brixton Artists Collective (BAC) in the early 1990s, established Artsway Ltd; a promotion company for visual and performance artists in the UK, and is a Co-Founder of PR and Arts Media company Occhi Arts & Entertainment, publisher of Occhi Magazine. He continues to work with other artists on collaborative projects.

== Artwork and career ==
David Emmanuel Noel studied art at college before pursuing undergraduate and post graduate study in the social sciences. He maintained an interest in the arts, particularly painting, and became successful selling work and securing commissions to pay his rent. In the early 1990s he went on to be involved in the Brixton Art Gallery in south London, exhibiting in the gallery's first advertised all-black male artist exhibition entitled From Where I Stand, and other public arts initiatives designed to create platforms for cross disciplinary collaboration. Working preferably in acrylics and oils, he has produced work of various styles which historically center on family, relationships, society and environmental issues.

== Exhibitions and collaborations ==
He has exhibited widely and participated in several high-profile arts-related events including The African and African-Caribbean Design Diaspora (ACDD) – originally co-funded by the Arts Council England/ Lottery Fund and supported by the London Design Festival – and the Whole 9/Culver City Peace Project Arts initiative, launched in 2010 to raise awareness and funds for victims of war and environment-related disasters, particularly in Africa and Asia. Based in New York, he continues to exhibit, working with a variety of visual and performing artists such as RnB artist and Britain's Got Talent finalist Lifford Shillingford and composer Darryl Yokley, providing artwork for the album Pictures at an African Exhibition, released via Truth Revolution Records in early 2018. The album’s title points to its clear inspiration, Modest Mussorgsky's famed Pictures at an Exhibition (1874), in which Mussorgsky composed music inspired by the artwork of his friend Viktor Hartmann. David Emmanuel Noel produced artwork for the album cover and 13 original pieces to accompany each album track. These were featured as part of a live performance and installation at the Philadelphia Museum of Art and the John F. Kennedy Center for the Performing Arts, Washington, D.C.

Continuing the diasporic theme, the artist has collaborated with others exploring the subjects of race, culture, and identity. Working with other interdisciplinary artists, including Professor Cheryl D Miller, and Neo-African abstract expressionist painter, Danny Simmons, he has co-curated and exhibited at the Caribbean Fine Art Fair in Barbados and facilitated various platforms promoting visual arts, music, and cinema from the region.

With a background in public relations, he has collaborated with fellow PR professionals whose creative practice spans the visual arts. He was a founding contributor to the Art of PR initiative, a collective of communications specialists comprising both amateur and professional artists, including award-winning painter Tonye Ekine, all of whom work in or have worked in communications and marketing. The collective has presented group exhibitions at the Coningsby Gallery in Fitzrovia, London, sponsored by Boldspace and 72Point Group.
