= Yaxley (surname) =

- Earlier spellings: Yoakley, Yockley, Yackslee, Yexley and Yokley
- Origin: England

Yaxley is an English toponymic surname, which along with dialectal variants, Yexley, Yoakley, Yockley, and Yokley, may derive from any of the English places that bore this name, including Yaxley, Cambridgeshire (formerly Huntingdonshire) and Yaxley, Suffolk. "Yacksley" is a variant form.

Notable people with the surname include:

Jonny Yaxley, a two time UK gravedigger of the year in 2014 and 2025

- Francis Yaxley (died 1565), English politician and conspirator
- Greta Yaxley (born 2000), television cook
- John Yaxley (died c. 1625), English lawyer and MP
- John Francis Yaxley (born 1936), civil servant in the UK Colonial Office
- Peter Yaxley (1928–2015), New Zealand rugby league player and referee
- Richard Yaxley (1560–1589), Catholic martyr
- Robert Yaxley (1912–1943), Royal Air Force pilot and commander during the Second World War
- Sandra Yaxley (born 1968), Australian swimmer with cerebral palsy, won gold in 1988 and 1992 Summer Paralympics
- Stephen Yaxley-Lennon (born 1982), better known as Tommy Robinson, British far-right political activist
