= Joe Worrall =

Joe Worrall may refer to:

- Joe Worrall (referee) (born 1945), English football referee
- Joe Worrall (footballer) (born 1997), English footballer
