= Cokley =

Cokley is a surname. Notable people with the surname include:

- Chris Cokley (born 1996), American basketball player
- Rebecca Cokley (born 1978), American disability rights activist and public speaker

== See also ==
- Coakley
- Cowley (surname)
