= Phil Hawker =

English footballer

Personal information
- Full name: Philip Nigel Hawker
- Date of birth: 7 December 1962 (age 63)
- Place of birth: Solihull, England
- Height: 6 ft 1 in (1.85 m)
- Position: Defender

Youth career
- 1978–1980: Birmingham City

Senior career*
Years	Team	Apps	(Gls)
1980–1983	Birmingham City	35	(1)
1982–1990	Walsall	177	(10)
1990	→ West Bromwich Albion (loan)	1	(0)
1990–1991	Kidderminster Harriers		
1991–1993	Solihull Borough		

International career
1981	England Youth	2	(0)
- * Club domestic league appearances and goals

Philip Nigel Hawker (born 7 December 1962) is an English former footballer who played as a defender. He scored 11 goals in 213 appearances in the Football League playing for Birmingham City, Walsall and West Bromwich Albion.

== Career ==
Hawker was born in Solihull. He began his football career as an apprentice with Birmingham City where he turned professional in 1980. He deputised at left-back for Mark Dennis in the latter's absence, but was allowed to join Walsall in the 1982–83 season. Hawker spent eight seasons with the club, helping them to promotion to the Second Division in 1988. He scored in the play-off final against Bristol City heading home a corner from Mark Goodwin to make it 3–0 as Walsall won 4–0. He played one league game on loan for West Bromwich Albion before moving into non-league football with Kidderminster Harriers and then Solihull Borough. He went on to run a car dealership.

== Honours ==
Walsall

- Football League Third Division play-offs: 1988
