= Coakley =

Coakley is a surname. Notable people with the surname include:

- Adam Coakley (born 1987), Scottish football striker
- Andy Coakley (1882–1963), US baseball pitcher born in Providence, Rhode Island
- Cheryl Coakley-Rivera (active 1995–2014), US politician from Massachusetts
- Daniel Coakley (born 1989), Filipino/US swimmer, member of Philippine team at 2007 Southeast Asian Games
- Dexter Coakley (born 1972), US American football linebacker
- Jackie Coakley (active 2014–2016), US student involved in sexual assault allegations reported in retracted article A Rape on Campus
- John Coakley (active 1994–2016), professor in School of Politics & International Relations, University College, Dublin
- Marion Coakley (1896–1968), American actress
- Martha Coakley (born 1953), US Attorney General of Massachusetts
- Paul Stagg Coakley (born 1955), US Roman Catholic prelate
- Richard Coakley (born 1983), Irish rower
- Sarah Coakley (born 1951), English Anglican theologian
- Sheridan Coakley, British interior designer
- Tommy Coakley (born 1947), Scottish football player and coach
- Vincent Coakley (1955–2020), Irish Gaelic footballer
- Wendy Coakley-Thompson (born 1966), US mainstream fiction author
