= Graeme Forbes (footballer) =

Scottish footballer

Personal information
- Full name: Graeme Scott Alexander Forbes
- Date of birth: 29 July 1958 (age 68)
- Place of birth: Forfar, Scotland
- Height: 6 ft 0 in (1.83 m)
- Position: Defender

Senior career*
Years	Team	Apps	(Gls)
1979–1980	Lochee United		
1980–1986	Motherwell	186	(16)
1986–1990	Walsall	173	(9)
1991	Dundee		
1992	Montrose		
- * Club domestic league appearances and goals

Graeme Scott Alexander Forbes (born 29 July 1958) is a Scottish former footballer who played in the Football League for Walsall. He also made over 200 appearances for Motherwell.

== Honours ==
Walsall

- Football League Third Division play-offs: 1988
