= English Football League play-offs =

Annual postseason elimination tournament

EFL play-offs
- Most recent season or competition: 2026 EFL play-offs
- Sport: Football
- Founded: 1987
- No. of teams: 14 (6, 4, 4 per division)
- Region: England; Wales
- Most recent champions: Leeds United (2nd title)
- Most titles: Blackpool (6 titles)
- Broadcasters: United Kingdom: Sky Sports; International: Varies by territory
- Streaming partners: United Kingdom: Sky Go; NOW TV; International: Varies by region
- Website: EFL Play-offs

The English Football League (EFL) play-offs are a series of play-off matches contested by six, four and four association football teams finishing immediately below the automatic promotion places in the second, third and fourth tiers of the English football league system, namely the EFL Championship, EFL League One and EFL League Two.

The play-offs currently comprise two single-leg "eliminators" (EFL Championship only), two semi-finals, each conducted as a two-legged tie with games played at each side's home ground. The aggregate winners of the semi-finals progress to the final, which is contested at Wembley Stadium; the victorious side is promoted to the league above, and the runners-up remain in the same division. In the event of drawn ties or finals, extra time followed by a penalty shoot-out are d as necessary.

The play-offs were introduced to the English Football League in 1987 and have been staged at the conclusion of every season since. The first three play-off seasons saw the finals also being conducted over two legs, on a home-and-away basis. Since 1990 the winners of each division's play-off competition have been determined in a one-off final. The venue for the final was the original Wembley Stadium for ten years before being moved to the Millennium Stadium in Cardiff, Wales, during Wembley's reconstruction, between 2000 and 2006. Since then, the finals have taken place at the rebuilt Wembley Stadium every year with the exception of 2011, when the third- and fourth-tier finals were hosted at Old Trafford as a result of a clash of fixtures with the UEFA Champions League final of that same year. The highest attendance for a championship final was in 2014, when QPR beat Derby County 1–0 before a crowd of 87,348. The play-off finals took place behind closed doors in 2020 as a result of the COVID-19 pandemic, while a restricted attendance watched the following season's finals.

In 2020, Deloitte reported that the club winning the Championship play-off final could expect a financial bonus of between £135 million and £265 million. This has led to the second-tier play-off final being variously described as "one of the most lucrative games in all of football" and "the richest game in football".

In 2022, VAR was introduced to all three of the finals at Wembley.

== History ==
The mid-1980s saw a decline in attendances at football matches and public disenchantment with English football. A number of instances of violence and tragedy struck the game. In March 1985 at the semi-final of the 1984–85 Football League Cup between Chelsea and Sunderland more than 100 people were arrested after various invasions of the Stamford Bridge pitch and more than 40 people, including 20 policemen, were injured. Nine days later, violence flared at the FA Cup match between Millwall and Luton Town: seats were used as missiles against the police and Luton Town subsequently banned away supporters. On 11 May, 56 people were killed and 265 injured in the Bradford City stadium fire and less than three weeks later, 39 supporters died and more than 600 were injured in the Heysel Stadium disaster while Liverpool were playing Juventus in the European Cup final.

In an attempt to persuade fans to return to the stadia, the Football League had rejected a £19 million television deal to broadcast matches live on the BBC and ITV before the 1985–86 Football League season, with League president Jack Dunnett suggesting that "football is prepared to have a year or two with no television". In December 1985 a ten-point plan was agreed which aimed to revitalise the financial affairs of the league. This "Heathrow Agreement" included a structural reorganisation of the league, reducing the top tier from 22 clubs to 20, and the introduction of play-offs to facilitate the change. The play-offs were brought in at the end of the 1986–87 Football League season. They were initially introduced for two years, with the provision that if they were successful with the general public they would be retained permanently.

== Format ==
=== History ===
For the first two seasons after the play-offs were inaugurated, the semi-finals were played between the three sides finishing below the automatic promotion places and the team one place above the relegation zone in the division above.

=== Current ===
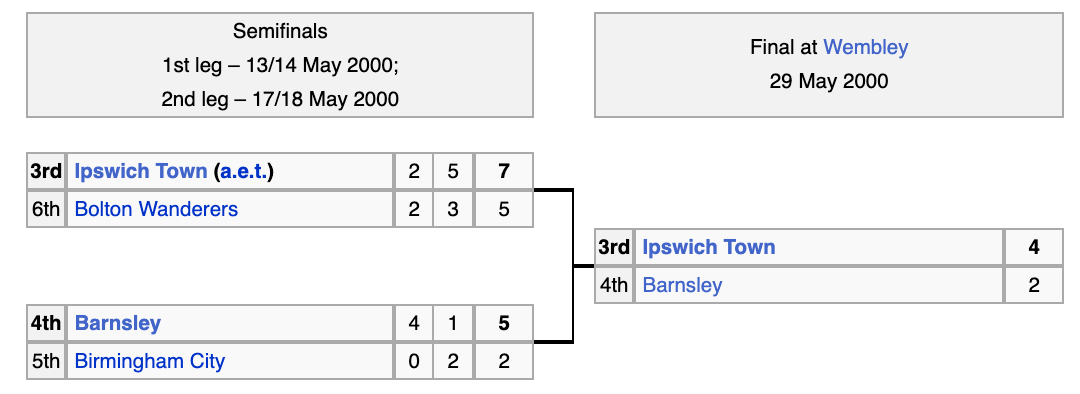
An example of the play-off format, from the 2000 First Division play-offs

Until 2025, the English Football League play-offs involved the four teams that finish directly below the automatic promotion places in each of the Championship, League One and League Two (the second, third, and fourth tiers of the English football league system). These teams meet in a series of play-off matches to determine the final team that will be promoted. The best-ranked team that fails to get automatically promoted plays the worst team that makes the playoffs while the other two teams play against each other, both in a two-legged tie: these matches are referred to as the "play-off semi-finals". The first leg between two teams in the semi-finals is played at the ground of the lower-position team in the league, while the second leg takes place at the higher-ranking side's ground. According to the EFL, "this is designed to give the highest finishing team an advantage".

The winner of each semi-final is determined by the aggregate score of the two legs. If the two teams are level on goals at the end of the regular 90 minutes of the second leg, the match goes into extra time, two 15-minute halves being played. If the score remains level at the end of extra time, the tie is decided by a penalty shootout. The away goals rule does not apply in the play-off semi-finals. The two semi-final winners then meet at Wembley Stadium, a neutral venue, for a one-off match referred to as the "play-off final". If required, extra time and a penalty shootout can be employed in the same manner as for the semi-finals to determine the winner. The runner-up and losing semi-finalists remain in the same league while the winning side are promoted.

Play-off nomenclature
Years	Second tier	Third tier	Fourth tier
1987–1992	Football League Second Division play-offs	Football League Third Division play-offs	Football League Fourth Division play-offs
1993–2004	Football League First Division play-offs	Football League Second Division play-offs	Football League Third Division play-offs
2005–2015	Football League Championship play-offs	Football League One play-offs	Football League Two play-offs
2016–present	EFL Championship play-offs	EFL League One play-offs	EFL League Two play-offs

=== Changes to format ===
During the first two stagings of the play-offs in 1987 and 1988, the four teams involved were the three clubs that finished directly below the automatic promotions positions, plus the club which finished directly above the automatic relegation places in the division above, similar to the Football League test matches of the 1890s. These play-offs were part of the league's two-season-long restructuring to reduce the number of teams in the top tier from 22 to 20 while increasing the number in the lower divisions to create three divisions of 24 clubs. During these seasons, only one club that entered the play-offs in a relegation place managed to win the play-offs and thereby retain their divisional status, Charlton Athletic in 1987.

In the seasons prior to the 1990 play-offs, the finals were two-legged ties with both teams hosting the other once. If the two teams could not be separated, a tie-breaker was then staged at a neutral venue. This was used on three occasions: the 1987 Second Division final was played at Birmingham City's St. Andrews; the 1987 Third Division final was played at Crystal Palace's Selhurst Park; and the 1988 Third Division final was played at Walsall's Fellows Park (though this was not a neutral venue, as Walsall was one of the clubs involved).

Before the 1999–2000 season away goals were used as a tie-breaker after extra time had been played, but this was abolished following a club initiative launched by then-Ipswich Town chairman David Sheepshanks, after his club had twice lost on away goals in 1997 and 1999. Since then away goals have played no part in the play-off system.

On 5 March 2026, the EFL approved the expansion of the Championship play-offs from 4 to 6 teams with the teams ranked 3rd and 4th advancing directly to two-legged semi-finals with 5th-8th contesting single-leg "eliminator" games. There will be reseeding before the semifinals so that the 3rd place plays the lowest-seeded eliminator round winner and 4th place plays the highest-seeded eliminator round winner. Any changes to the League One and League Two play-off formats have been ruled out.

=== Proposed changes ===
In 2003 Crystal Palace chief executive Phil Alexander proposed a change to the format of the play-offs. Alexander recommended expanding the number of teams in each play-off series from four to six, providing more clubs with a chance at promotion. Additionally, the two-legged semi-finals would have been replaced by one-off quarter-final and semi-final games, both of which would give home advantage to the team that finished higher during the league season. The two highest placed clubs in the play-off series would advance directly to the semi-final, while the other four clubs would contest the quarter-final. The proposed changes were narrowly approved by Football League chairmen and were set to be voted upon at the league's annual general meeting. However, the motion was withdrawn because of objections from the Premier League and the Football Association.

== Venues ==
Play-off final venues
Years	Venue
1987–1989	Home and away
1990–2000	Wembley Stadium (former)
2001–2006	Millennium Stadium
2007–2010	Wembley Stadium
2011	Wembley Stadium/Old Trafford
2012–Present	Wembley Stadium

Throughout the history of the English Football League play-offs, the semi-finals have been conducted as two-legged matches played at the two stadia of the competing teams, less than a week apart. Between the 1987 and 1989 play-offs, the finals were also played on a home-and-away basis over two matches, occasionally with a replay being required: in the 1988 Football League Third Division play-off final, the aggregate score after the two legs between Walsall and Bristol City was 3–3, so a penalty shoot-out was used to determine which side would host the replay. Walsall won 4–2 and earned the right to play the deciding match at their home ground, Fellows Park, where they triumphed 4–0.

From the 1990 play-offs, each play-off final was a single match, which was hosted at the original Wembley Stadium. Typically, the finals of the three divisions took place, one match per day, across the second bank holiday weekend in May. During that first "Wembley Weekend" in 1990, spectators totalled almost 130,000, including nearly 73,000 for the Second Division final between Swindon Town and Sunderland. This was markedly greater than the largest crowd during the 1989–90 First Division season, around 47,000, at Old Trafford to watch Manchester United against Arsenal, and roughly the same as the attendance at the 1990 FIFA World Cup Final. All of the second tier play-off finals played between 1990 and 1999 attracted crowds in excess of 55,000, with half of them seeing more than 70,000 in attendance. During that period, the record attendance for the third-tier decider came at the 1999 Second Division play-off final, when 76,935 people watched Manchester City beat Gillingham in a penalty shoot-out after scoring twice in the final two minutes to force the match into extra time. The former Wembley Stadium record for attendance in the fourth tier play-off final came in 1997 when a crowd of 46,804 witnessed Northampton Town's John Frain score in the last minute of the match to beat Swansea City 1–0.

The play-off finals were held outside England for the first time from the 2000 season. Due to the redevelopment of Wembley Stadium, along with the FA Cup Final, they were hosted by the Millennium Stadium in Cardiff, Wales. Teams who prepared for matches, including in cup competitions, in the south changing room went undefeated in twelve consecutive games; however, the "jinx" was broken in the 2002 Second Division play-off final, when Stoke City beat Brentford after having used the north changing room. Attendances continued to be high at the Welsh national stadium, with the second tier finals attracting more than 65,000 spectators on all but one occasion and the 2003 third tier final watched by 66,096 people when Cardiff City beat Queens Park Rangers 1–0 with an extra-time goal from Andy Campbell.

The play-off finals returned to Wembley Stadium for the first time after its reconstruction in the 2007 season, and over the next five seasons attendances improved further. The 2007 fourth tier play-off final between Bristol Rovers and Shrewsbury Town drew a crowd of 61,589, while 75,132 people watched Doncaster Rovers beat Leeds United 1–0 in the 2008 Football League One play-off final. The same season saw 86,703 in attendance at the Championship play-off final in which Hull City beat Bristol City 1–0. Owing to the 2011 UEFA Champions League Final being held at Wembley Stadium on 28 May 2011, it was confirmed in January 2011 that Wembley would host the Championship play-off final on 30 May, while Old Trafford would host the League Two and League One finals on the preceding two days. From the 2012 final onwards, the final matches for all three divisions have been at Wembley. For the 2020 finals, all three games were delayed until August and played behind closed doors, with an official attendance of zero, because of the COVID-19 pandemic. The following season, a restricted number of supporters were allowed to attend the finals. That year the Championship play-off final was watched by 11,689 spectators, while the third and fourth tier finals both saw crowds of under 10,000.

== Prize ==
View source data.
Minimum value of winning the second tier play-off final over three years

The significant financial boost from winning the Championship play-off final has led to it being described as "one of the most lucrative games in all of football", and "the richest game in soccer". Accountants Deloitte described the 2020 final as the "contest for biggest financial prize in world football" with promotion worth at least £135 million in the first season after promotion and an additional £130 million the following season should an immediate relegation be avoided. However, by convention the two finalists agree that the loser will keep all the gate receipts from the game, to slightly soften the financial blow of missing out.

As the gulf in financial power between clubs in the Premier League and the Championship widened, in the 2006-07 season parachute payments were introduced to reduce the impact of relegation. Thus for two seasons following relegation a club would receive half of the per-club Premier League basic television money. As a result, should the Championship play-off winners be relegated in their first season in the Premier League, as of 2020 they would still receive a total of around £75 million in "parachute payments" over the next two seasons. The parachute payments were intended to lower the risk of a club going into administration because of the high cost base (mainly player wages) they brought from the higher division.

The financial value of winning the EFL League One play-off is the additional remuneration clubs receive in the Championship. As of 2018 clubs in the third tier receive around £1.4 million, comprising a "basic award" and a "solidarity" payment, the latter of which is funded by the Premier League to help mitigate concerns about the impact the parachute payments might have to the competitive balance of the league. In the second tier, the total funding rises to around £7 million, a fivefold increase in revenue. Similarly the financial benefit of winning the lower league play-offs is derived from the additional remuneration clubs receive in the league above. For example, as of 2020, clubs in League One receive around £675,000 from the Premier League as a "core club" payment compared to £450,000 in League Two. The winners of each final also receive a trophy.

== Past winners ==
Key to list of winners and runner-sup
Year	Link to play-off article for specified year
Winner (X)	Team that won play-off final, (X) indicates cumulative number of play-off final victories
Score	Link to play-off final article for the specified match
^	Final played over two legs
R	Final decided by a replay
a.e.t.	Final went to extra time
pen.	Final decided by a penalty shoot-out
Runner-up	Team that lost play-off final

Year	Second tier			Third tier			Fourth tier		
Year	Winner	Final score	Runner-up	Winner	Final score	Runner-up	Winner	Final score	Runner-up
1987^	Charlton Athletic	2–1 R	Leeds United	Swindon Town	2–0 R	Gillingham	Aldershot	3–0	Wolverhampton Wanderers
1988^	Middlesbrough	2–1	Chelsea	Walsall	4–0 R	Bristol City	Swansea City	5–4	Torquay United
1989^	Crystal Palace	4–3	Blackburn Rovers	Port Vale	2–1	Bristol Rovers	Leyton Orient	2–1	Wrexham
1990	Swindon Town	1–0 (Note: Owing to financial irregularities, Swindon Town were prevented from taking their place in the top division, which was instead awarded to the losing finalists, Sunderland.)	Sunderland	Notts County	2–0	Tranmere Rovers	Cambridge United	1–0	Chesterfield
1991	Notts County	3–1	Brighton & Hove Albion	Tranmere Rovers	1–0	Bolton Wanderers	Torquay United	2–2 (a.e.t.) (5–4 pen.)	Blackpool
1992	Blackburn Rovers	1–0	Leicester City	Peterborough United	2–1	Stockport County	Blackpool	1–1 (a.e.t.) (4–3 pen.)	Scunthorpe United
1993	Swindon Town (2)	4–3	Leicester City	West Bromwich Albion	3–0	Port Vale	York City	1–1 (a.e.t.) (5–3 pen.)	Crewe Alexandra
1994	Leicester City	2–1	Derby County	Burnley	2–1	Stockport County	Wycombe Wanderers	4–2	Preston North End
1995	Bolton Wanderers	4–3 (a.e.t.)	Reading	Huddersfield Town	2–1	Bristol Rovers	Chesterfield	2–0	Bury
1996	Leicester City (2)	2–1 (a.e.t.)	Crystal Palace	Bradford City	1–0	Notts County	Plymouth Argyle	1–0	Darlington
1997	Crystal Palace (2)	1–0	Sheffield United	Crewe Alexandra	1–0	Brentford	Northampton Town	1–0	Swansea City
1998	Charlton Athletic (2)	4–4 (a.e.t.) (7–6 pen.)	Sunderland	Grimsby Town	1–0	Northampton Town	Colchester United	1–0	Torquay United
1999	Watford	2–0	Bolton Wanderers	Manchester City	2–2 (a.e.t.) (3–1 pen.)	Gillingham	Scunthorpe United	1–0	Leyton Orient
2000	Ipswich Town	4–2	Barnsley	Gillingham	3–2 (a.e.t.)	Wigan Athletic	Peterborough United	1–0	Darlington
2001	Bolton Wanderers (2)	3–0	Preston North End	Walsall (2)	3–2 (a.e.t.)	Reading	Blackpool (2)	4–2	Leyton Orient
2002	Birmingham City	1–1 (a.e.t.) (4–2 pen.)	Norwich City	Stoke City	2–0	Brentford	Cheltenham Town	3–1	Rushden & Diamonds
2003	Wolverhampton Wanderers	3–0	Sheffield United	Cardiff City	1–0 (a.e.t.)	Queens Park Rangers	Bournemouth	5–2	Lincoln City
2004	Crystal Palace (3)	1–0	West Ham United	Brighton & Hove Albion	1–0	Bristol City	Huddersfield Town	0–0 (a.e.t.) (4–1 pen.)	Mansfield Town
2005	West Ham United	1–0	Preston North End	Sheffield Wednesday	4–2 (a.e.t.)	Hartlepool United	Southend United	2–0 (a.e.t.)	Lincoln City
2006	Watford (2)	3–0	Leeds United	Barnsley	2–2 (a.e.t.) (4–3 pen.)	Swansea City	Cheltenham Town (2)	1–0	Grimsby Town
2007	Derby County	1–0	West Bromwich Albion	Blackpool	2–0	Yeovil Town	Bristol Rovers	3–1	Shrewsbury Town
2008	Hull City	1–0	Bristol City	Doncaster Rovers	1–0	Leeds United	Stockport County	3–2	Rochdale
2009	Burnley	1–0	Sheffield United	Scunthorpe United	3–2	Millwall	Gillingham	1–0	Shrewsbury Town
2010	Blackpool	3–2	Cardiff City	Millwall	1–0	Swindon Town	Dagenham & Redbridge	3–2	Rotherham United
2011	Swansea City	4–2	Reading	Peterborough United (2)	3–0	Huddersfield Town	Stevenage	1–0	Torquay United
2012	West Ham United (2)	2–1	Blackpool	Huddersfield Town (2)	0–0 (a.e.t.) (8–7 pen.)	Sheffield United	Crewe Alexandra	2–0	Cheltenham Town
2013	Crystal Palace (4)	1–0 (a.e.t.)	Watford	Yeovil Town	2–1	Brentford	Bradford City	3–0	Northampton Town
2014	Queens Park Rangers	1–0	Derby County	Rotherham United	2–2 (a.e.t.) (4–3 pen.)	Leyton Orient	Fleetwood Town	1–0	Burton Albion
2015	Norwich City	2–0	Middlesbrough	Preston North End	4–0	Swindon Town	Southend United (2)	1–1 (a.e.t.) (7–6 pen.)	Wycombe Wanderers
2016	Hull City (2)	1–0	Sheffield Wednesday	Barnsley (2)	3–1	Millwall	AFC Wimbledon	2–0	Plymouth Argyle
2017	Huddersfield Town	0–0 (a.e.t.) (4–3 pen.)	Reading	Millwall (2)	1–0	Bradford City	Blackpool (3)	2–1	Exeter City
2018	Fulham	1–0	Aston Villa	Rotherham United (2)	2–1 (a.e.t.)	Shrewsbury Town	Coventry City	3–1	Exeter City
2019	Aston Villa	2–1	Derby County	Charlton Athletic	2–1	Sunderland	Tranmere Rovers	1–0 (a.e.t.)	Newport County
2020	Fulham (2)	2–1 (a.e.t.)	Brentford	Wycombe Wanderers	2–1	Oxford United	Northampton Town (2)	4–0	Exeter City
2021	Brentford	2–0	Swansea City	Blackpool (2)	2–1	Lincoln City	Morecambe	1–0	Newport County
2022	Nottingham Forest	1–0	Huddersfield Town	Sunderland	2–0	Wycombe Wanderers	Port Vale	3–0	Mansfield Town
2023	Luton Town	1–1 (a.e.t.) (6–5 pen.)	Coventry City	Sheffield Wednesday (2)	1–0 (a.e.t.)	Barnsley	Carlisle United	1–1 (a.e.t.) (5–4 pen.)	Stockport County
2024	Southampton	1–0	Leeds United	Oxford United	2–0	Bolton Wanderers	Crawley Town	2–0	Crewe Alexandra
2025	Sunderland	2–1	Sheffield United	Charlton Athletic	1–0	Leyton Orient	AFC Wimbledon	1–0	Walsall
2026	Hull City (3)	1-0	Middlesbrough	Bolton Wanderers	4-1	Stockport County	Notts County	3-0	Salford City

== See also ==
- Football League test matches
