= Glenn Humphries =

English footballer

Personal information
- Full name: Glenn Humphries
- Date of birth: 11 August 1964 (age 62)
- Place of birth: Hull, England
- Height: 6 ft 0 in (1.83 m)
- Position: Defender

Youth career
- Doncaster Rovers

Senior career*
Years	Team	Apps	(Gls)
1982–1987	Doncaster Rovers	180	(8)
1987	→ Lincoln City (loan)	9	(0)
1987–1991	Bristol City	85	(0)
1991–1993	Scunthorpe United	72	(5)
1993–1995	Voicelink/Golden		
1995–1996	Hull City	12	(0)
1996–1997	Gainsborough Trinity		
Total		358	(13)

International career
1983	England Youth	6	(0)
- * Club domestic league appearances and goals

Glenn Humphries (born 11 August 1964) is an English former footballer who played as a defender in the Football League for Doncaster Rovers, Lincoln City, Bristol City, Scunthorpe United and Hull City, and in the Hong Kong First Division League for Golden. He was part of the Doncaster team promoted from the Fourth Division in the 1983–84 season.
