= 2015 Football League One play-off final =

Association football match between Swindon and Preston North End held in 2015

- The match took place at Wembley Stadium.
Preston North End	Swindon Town
4	0
- Date: 24 May 2015
- Venue: Wembley Stadium, London
- Man of the Match: Jermaine Beckford (Preston)
- Referee: Andrew Madley
- Attendance: 48,236

The 2015 Football League One play-off final was an association football match which was played on 24 May 2015 at Wembley Stadium, London, between Preston North End and Swindon Town to determine the third and final team to gain promotion from League One to the Championship. The top two teams of the 2014–15 League One season gained automatic promotion to the Championship, while the teams placed from third to sixth place in the table partook in play-off semi-finals; the winners of these semi-finals competed for the final place for the 2015–16 season in the Championship.

It was the first time that Preston had ever been promoted through the play-offs, having failed in their nine previous attempts and losing in all three final appearances. Swindon had won three of their four previous play-off finals. A Wembley Stadium crowd of more than 48,000 people watched the game, which was refereed by Andrew Madley. Preston's Jermaine Beckford, who was on loan from Bolton Wanderers, opened the scoring after four minutes and Paul Huntington doubled the lead on thirteen minutes. Beckford scored again just before the end of the first half, and completed his hat-trick twelve minutes into the second half, becoming the third player to score three or more goals in a play-off final held at Wembley. Despite dominating possession throughout, Swindon were unable to score, and the match ended 4–0 in Preston's favour.

Swindon ended the following season in sixteenth place in League One, fifteen points outside the play-off places and thirteen points above the relegation zone. Preston's next season saw them finish in eleventh place in the EFL Championship, twelve points below the play-offs and twenty-two points above the relegation zone.

== Route to the final ==
Football League One final table, leading positions
Pos	Team	Pld	W	D	L	GF	GA	GD	Pts
1	Bristol City	46	29	12	5	96	38	+58	99
2	Milton Keynes Dons	46	27	10	9	101	44	+57	91
3	Preston North End	46	25	14	7	79	40	+39	89
4	Swindon Town	46	23	10	13	76	57	+19	79
5	Sheffield United	46	19	14	13	66	53	+13	71
6	Chesterfield	46	19	12	15	68	55	+13	69

Preston North End finished the regular 2014–15 season in third place in League One, the third tier of the English football league system, one place ahead of Swindon Town. Both therefore missed out on the two automatic places for promotion to the Championship and instead took part in the play-offs to determine the third promoted team. Preston finished two points behind Milton Keynes Dons (who were promoted in second place) and ten behind league winners Bristol City. Swindon ended the season ten points behind Preston.

Swindon's opponents for the play-off semi-final were Sheffield United and the first leg was played at Bramall Lane in Sheffield. Kieron Freeman put the home side into the lead on 17 minutes with a half-volley, while Swindon's Ben Gladwin saw his penalty saved eleven minutes later. Sam Ricketts equalised for the visitors with a header but Nathan Byrne's low strike in injury time from 18 yards (16 m) beat Mark Howard to ensure Swindon won the match 2–1. The return leg was held at Swindon's County Ground four days later. Gladwin scored twice in the opening ten minutes before Michael Smith further extended Swindon's lead to 3–0. Nathan Thompson scored an own goal a minute later, and United's Chris Basham's header made it 3–2 in Swindon's favour at half time. Smith scored his second, and Swindon's fourth of the match, from the penalty spot, before Steven Davies pulled one back for United. Jon Obika's 84th minute goal made it 5–3, but late goals from Matt Done and Ché Adams ensured the game ended level at 5–5, with Swindon qualifying for the play-off final 7–6 on aggregate. It was the highest scoring play-off semi-final in history, and was described by Swindon's manager Mark Cooper as "a freak of a game ... we kept scoring, they kept scoring and it was a ridiculous game of football."

Preston North End faced Chesterfield in their semi-final play-off, and the first leg was played at the Proact Stadium, Chesterfield. Jermaine Beckford, on loan at Preston from Bolton Wanderers since November 2014, scored early in the first half for the visiting team, and despite second-half dominance by Chesterfield, no further goals were scored and the match ended 1–0. The second leg was played three days later at Preston's Deepdale. Beckford opened the scoring late in the first half, before a penalty from Joe Garner doubled Preston's lead on the day. With three minutes remaining in regular time, Beckford scored his second, this time from the halfway line, and the game ended 3–0, meaning that Preston progressed to the final with a 4–0 aggregate victory.

Preston North End			Round	Swindon Town
Opponent	Result	Legs	Semi-finals	Opponent	Result	Legs
Chesterfield	4–0	1–0 away; 3–0 home		Sheffield United	7–6	2–1 away; 5–5 home

== Match ==
=== Background ===
This was Preston North End's tenth attempt to be promoted via the play-offs, with their three previous finals all ending in defeat. They lost the 1994 Third Division play-off final against Wycombe Wanderers 4–2, the 2001 First Division play-off final 3–0 to Bolton Wanderers, and the 2005 Championship play-off final 1–0 against West Ham United. Swindon had experienced victory and defeat in play-off finals, and this was their fifth final appearance. They won the two-legged 1987 Third Division play-off final against Gillingham, although it required a replay at a neutral venue after the first two matches ended in an aggregate draw. Swindon then won the 1990 Second Division play-off final 1–0 against Sunderland, although they were not promoted as a result of financial irregularities throughout the 1989–90 season. In the 1993 First Division play-off final, Swindon did secure promotion to the top tier of English football with a 4–3 victory over Leicester City. The club's most recent play-off final was when they lost 1–0 to Millwall in the 2010 League One play-off final. In the two league matches played between the clubs during the regular season, Swindon won 1–0 at home in November 2014 but lost 3–0 at Preston the following April. Preston's Garner was the league's highest scorer with 25 goals before the play-offs, while Andy Williams was Swindon's top marksman with 21.

Preston were aiming to be promoted back to the second tier of English having spent four seasons in League One. Swindon had been promoted as champions from League Two in the 2011–12 season but failed to progress past the semi-finals in the 2013 Football League play-offs and had played in League One for two seasons. Preston were favourites to win, according to bookmakers. The match was broadcast live in the UK on Sky Sports.

The referee for the match was Andrew Madley, representing the West Yorkshire Association Football League, with assistants Dan Cook and Wade Norcott, and Mark Haywood acting as the fourth official. Preston were allocated 30,035 seats in the West End of Wembley Stadium, while Swindon's allocation was 30,485 in the East End. Preston named an unchanged starting line-up from the team who won the second leg of the semi-final against Chesterfield. There were two changes for Swindon, Obika and Harry Toffolo were chosen ahead of Jermaine Hylton and Ricketts. Both teams wore their traditional home kits for the match, with Preston in white and Swindon in red.

=== First half ===
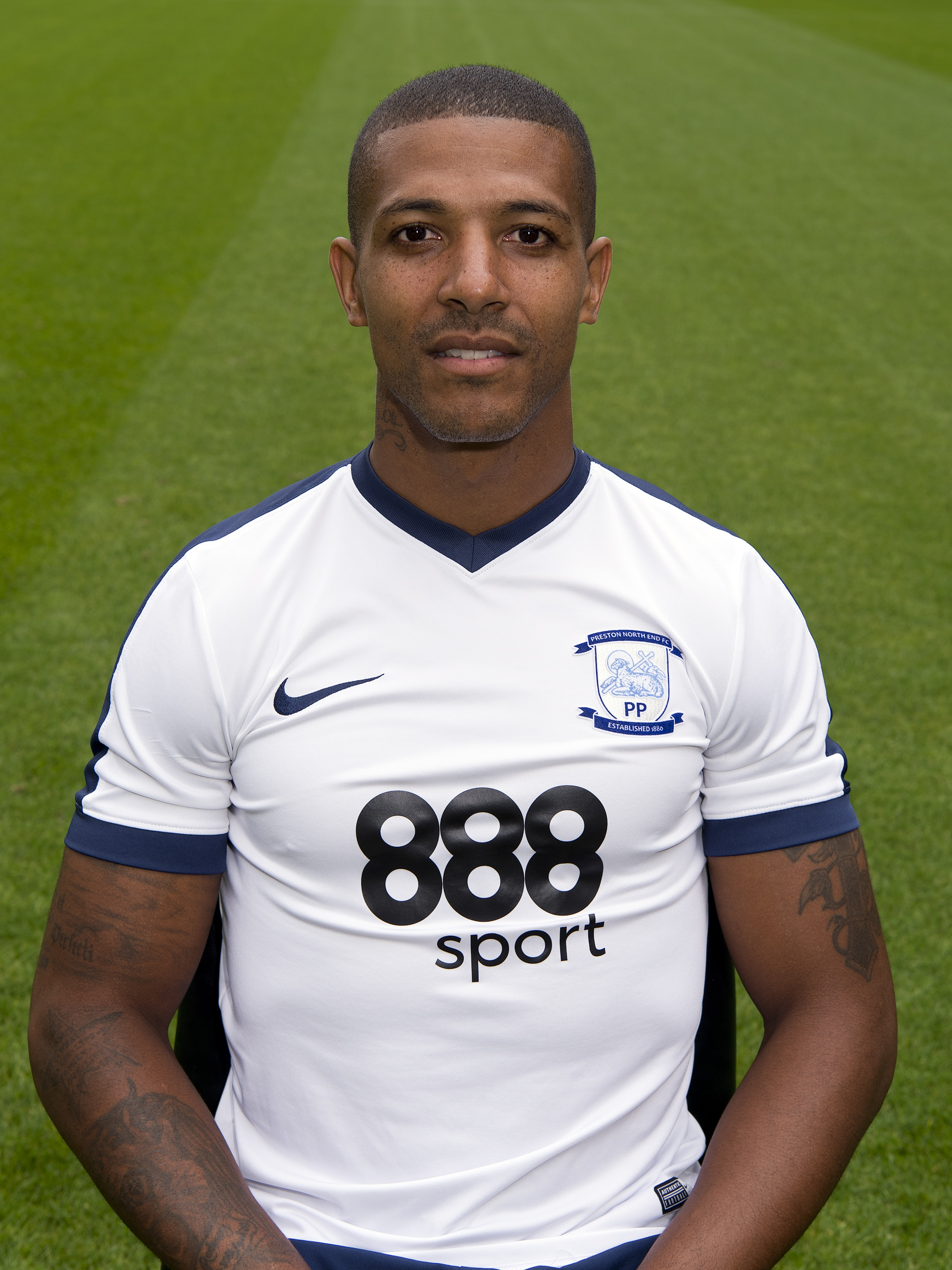
Jermaine Beckford (pictured in 2016) scored twice in the first half before completing his hat-trick in the second.

Swindon kicked the match off around 5:30 p.m. in front of a Wembley Stadium crowd of 48,236. Preston's Beckford was fouled by Thompson after two minutes. The resulting free kick from Paul Gallagher was swept into the Swindon net by Beckford, making it 1–0 to Preston. Thompson was injured during the goal and was stretchered off the pitch, forcing Swindon to make an early substitution, with Ricketts coming on to replace him. On 6 minutes, Garner passed to Gallagher whose shot was blocked. Seven minutes later, Gallagher's corner was initially cleared back to him, but his subsequent cross was converted by Paul Huntington from 5 yards (4.6 m), doubling Preston's lead after thirteen minutes. In the 23rd minute, Swindon defender Jack Stephens set off on a run, beat the Preston midfielder John Welsh with a step over, but his shot was deflected. Five minutes later, Gallagher went down with a foot injury and despite being able to continue briefly, he was replaced in the 37th minute by Alan Browne. With two minutes of the half remaining, Swindon's Smith came close to halving the deficit but his header from Byrne's cross went wide from 2 yards (1.8 m). In the 44th minute, Garner won a flick-on, allowing Beckford to run onto it. After a Cruyff Turn, he curled a left-footed shot into the far corner to make it 3–0 to Preston at half time, despite Swindon having almost two-thirds of the possession.

=== Second half ===
No changes were made at half-time and Preston kicked off the second half. On 50 minutes, Garner's through ball was picked up by Beckford but his shot was turned behind by Wes Foderingham in the Swindon goal. Three minutes later, Yaser Kasim received the first yellow card of the game for kicking Garner after also fouling him. In the 57th minute, Beckford made it 4–0 to Preston: a poor pass from Kasim was intercepted by Garner, who played the ball forward to Beckford. He advanced on to Swindon's goal and slid the ball past an advancing Foderingham, to complete his hat-trick. In doing so, Beckford became the third player to score a hat-trick in a Wembley play-off final, after Scott Sinclair for Swansea City in the 2011 Championship play-off final and Clive Mendonca for Charlton Athletic in the 1998 First Division play-off final. Five minutes later, Swindon's appeal for a penalty were turned down after Calum Woods' handball in the Preston penalty area was deemed accidental. On 65 minutes, Obika's first chance in the form of a header was easily saved by the Preston goalkeeper Sam Johnstone. A minute later Toffolo was substituted off for Swindon's top scorer Williams, before Preston made their second change of the game, with Kevin Davies on for Beckford. Davies' first chance came from a free kick in the 72nd minute, but he headed wide of the Swindon goal. Five minutes after that, he narrowly failed to convert a Garner header. With eight minutes remaining, Johnstone saved Gladwin's 25 yards (23 m) strike and a minute later prevented Obika's header from going in. After three minutes of additional time, the referee brought the game to a close, and Preston won 4–0.

=== Details ===
24 May 2015
17:30

Preston North End	4–0	Swindon Town
Beckford 3', 44', 57'; Huntington 13'	Report

Wembley Stadium, London
Attendance: 48,236
Referee: Andrew Madley

Preston North End	Swindon Town

34	Sam Johnstone
5	Tom Clarke
6	Bailey Wright
23	Paul Huntington
15	Calum Woods
19	John Welsh
8	Neil Kilkenny
24	Daniel Johnson
12	Paul Gallagher	(substituted off) 37'
10	Jermaine Beckford	(substituted off) 68'
14	Joe Garner
Substitutes:
21	Thorsten Stuckmann
3	Scott Laird
7	Chris Humphrey
17	Kyel Reid
31	Alan Browne	(substituted on) 37'
9	Kevin Davies	(substituted on) 68'
25	Jordan Hugill
Manager:
Simon Grayson

1	Wes Foderingham
5	Jack Stephens
2	Nathan Thompson	(substituted off) 5'
6	Jordan Turnbull
3	Nathan Byrne
4	Massimo Luongo
8	Yaser Kasim	(yellow card) 53'
7	Ben Gladwin	(substituted off) 58'
15	Harry Toffolo	(substituted off) 66'
9	Michael Smith
20	Jonathan Obika
Substitutes:
25	Tyrell Belford
29	Raphael Rossi Branco
36	Sam Ricketts	(substituted on) 5'
19	Louis Thompson	(substituted on) 58'
26	Anton Rodgers
10	Andy Williams	(substituted on) 66'
24	Jermaine Hylton
Manager:
Mark Cooper

=== Statistics ===
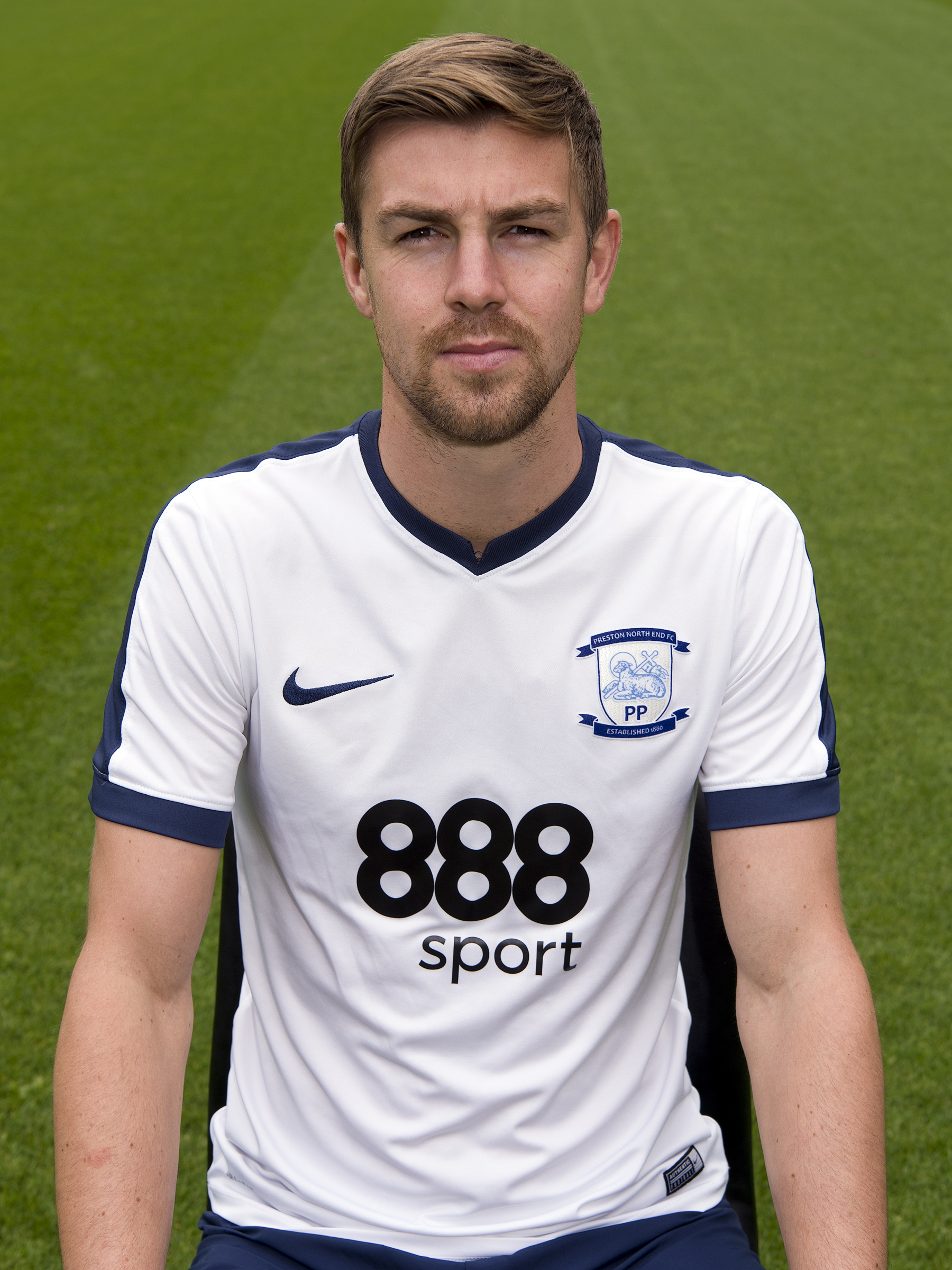
Paul Huntington (pictured in 2016) doubled Preston's lead early in the first half.

Statistics
	Preston	Swindon
Possession	32%	68%
Goals scored	4	0
Shots on target	6	3
Shots off target	3	10
Fouls committed	14	7
Corner kicks	3	6
Yellow cards	0	1
Red cards	0	0

== Post-match ==
Simon Grayson, the Preston manager, commented: "We had two weeks to prepare for this match and it's full credit to the players that they turned up on the day and executed the gameplan to a tee. We showed character and determination and finished off a job we should have completed two weeks ago." Beckford remarked: "We knew it would be a difficult game and it shows the character and the application we've got within the team and the staff. We did a fantastic job of exploiting the spaces." Huntington spoked of finally breaking Preston's play-off run of defeats: "It means everything. We had to do it the hard way. I can't speak highly enough of the staff and the players. We've broken that hoodoo now." Swindon's manager Cooper said after the game: "we didn't deal with Joe Garner and Jermaine Beckford. If a ball comes in your box and you don't want to head it or compete then you're in trouble. You've got to give credit to Preston, they were excellent." Beckford won the man of the match award, and when asked if he was going to stay with Preston, he stated: "we'll see". After being released by Bolton Wanderers, Beckford signed a permanent two-year contract with Preston North End effective from 1 July 2015.

Swindon ended the following season in sixteenth place in League One, fifteen points outside the play-off places and thirteen points above the relegation zone. Mark Cooper left the club on 17 October 2015. Preston's following season saw them finish in eleventh place in the EFL Championship, twelve points below the play-offs and twenty-two points above the relegation zone.
