= Tommy Coakley =

Scottish footballer and manager

Personal information
- Full name: Thomas Coakley
- Date of birth: 21 May 1947 (age 79)
- Place of birth: Bellshill, Scotland
- Position: Right winger

Senior career*
Years	Team	Apps	(Gls)
- Possilpark Juniors
–1963	Bellshill Athletic		
1963–1966	Motherwell	22	(1)
1966–1967	Arsenal	9	(1)
1968	Detroit Cougars	20	(0)
1968–1970	Greenock Morton	44	(8)
1970–1976	Chelmsford City		

Managerial career
- 1976–1983: Maldon Town
- 1983–1986: Bishop's Stortford
- 1986–1988: Walsall
- Blakenall
- Telford United
- * Club domestic league appearances and goals

Thomas Coakley (born 21 May 1947) is a Scottish former football player and coach. Coakley, who played as a right winger, made 95 league appearances in a professional career which saw him play in Scotland, England, and the United States. After retiring as a player, Coakley became a football coach.

== Playing career ==
Born in Bellshill, Coakley began his career with local side Possilpark Juniors, later moving to Bellshill Athletic, before making his debut in the Scottish Football League with Motherwell.

Coakley later played in the Football League for Arsenal. Following the departure of Alan Skirton, Coakley became a mainstay of the Arsenal first team for the start of the 1966–67 season when he made 13 consecutive starts under new manager Bertie Mee. On 8 October 1966. Coakley made his final appearance in an Arsenal shirt in a 2–0 victory over Newcastle United at Highbury. Coakley subsequently moved to the United States, to play in the North American Soccer League for the Detroit Cougars, before returning to Scotland to play with Greenock Morton. In total, Coakley made 95 league appearances for Morton, scoring 10 goals.

In 1970, Coakley signed for Chelmsford City, scoring on his debut in a 1–0 Southern League Cup win against Hereford United on 2 December 1970. In the 1971–72 season, Coakley made 45 appearances in all competitions, scoring three goals, as Chelmsford won the Southern League and Non-League Champions Cup double. Coakley retired in 1976, having scored 20 goals in 276 appearances in all competitions for Chelmsford.

== Managerial career ==
Coakley's management career began in the English non-league system, managing clubs including Maldon Town and Bishop's Stortford. When Alan Buckley was dismissed within 90 minutes of Third Division club Walsall being taken over by Terry Ramsden in the 1986 close season, Coakley was a surprise replacement. He led the club to an eighth-place finish in his first season, and promotion via the playoffs in 1988, but was dismissed in December 1988 after a ten-game losing streak. Coakley later managed Telford United, before leaving football in 1993.

== After football ==
After an unsuccessful investment in betting shops, Coakley started a golf business with David Kelly, who had played for him at Walsall.

== Honours ==
Walsall

- Football League Third Division play-offs: 1988
