= Alan Walsh (footballer) =

English footballer

Personal information
- Full name: Alan Walsh
- Date of birth: 9 February 1956 (age 70)
- Place of birth: Hartlepool, England
- Height: 6 ft 0 in (1.83 m)
- Positions: Winger; striker

Senior career*
Years	Team	Apps	(Gls)
1977–1978	Middlesbrough	3	(0)
1978–1984	Darlington	251	(87)
1984–1989	Bristol City	218	(77)
1989–1991	Beşiktaş	45	(13)
1991	Walsall	4	(0)
1991	Huddersfield Town	4	(0)
1992	Shrewsbury Town	2	(0)
1992	Cardiff City	1	(0)
1992–1993	Michelotti		(6)
1994–1995	Hartlepool United	4	(1)
1995	Bath City		
- * Club domestic league appearances and goals

Alan Walsh (born 9 December 1956) is an English former professional footballer who played as a winger or striker. He spent much of his career with Bristol City and Darlington, where he was the club's record goalscorer. He won two Turkish Süper Lig championships with Beşiktaş.

== Early and personal life ==
Walsh was born to June (née Stockton) and John Walsh. He has one younger sister, Terry. His son, Phil is also a footballer who has played in the Football League for Dagenham & Redbridge and Barnet. His eldest daughter, Kayte, married actor Kelsey Grammer in February 2011.

== Career ==
Walsh started his career in 1977 with Middlesbrough, but moved to Darlington the following year. He spent six years at the club, where he became the club's record goalscorer, with 87 goals in the league and 100 overall.

In 1984, he joined Bristol City, where he amassed 218 league appearances, winning their player of the season award in 1987–88. During his time at Bristol City he became renowned as an early exponent of the stepover football skill, colloquially known as the 'Walshy shuffle', later to be popularised by players such as Cristiano Ronaldo. In 1986 Walsh won a winners medal as part of the Bristol City team that beat Bolton Wanderers 3–0 in the Football League Trophy final.

He moved to Turkish club Beşiktaş in 1989, where he won two Süper Lig titles, before finishing his professional career back in the English Football League with short spells at Walsall, Huddersfield Town, Shrewsbury Town and Cardiff City.

After retiring from playing he rejoined Bristol City as a coach and stayed with the club for 11 years in a variety of coaching roles. On 19 October 2011 he left his job as Bristol City's development coach. He joined Bristol Rovers as youth team coach in 2012, a role he held until 2016.

== Honours ==
Bristol City

- Associate Members' Cup: 1985–86; runner-up: 1986–87

Beşiktaş

- Süper Lig: 1989–90, 1990–91
- Turkish Cup: 1989–90
- Turkish Super Cup: 1989
