= 1988 Football League play-offs =

Football League play-offs
- Season: 1987–88
- Champions: Middlesbrough (Second Division); Walsall (Third Division); Swansea City (Fourth Division)
- Matches played: 19
- Goals scored: 50 (2.63 per match)
- Biggest home win: Walsall 4–0 Bristol City (Third Division)
- Biggest away win: Notts County 1–3 Walsall (Third Division); Bristol City 1–3 Walsall (Third Division)
- Highest scoring: Torquay 3–3 Swansea (6 goals)
- Highest attendance: 40,550 – Chelsea v Middlesbrough (Second Division final)
- Lowest attendance: 4,602 – Torquay v Scunthorpe (Fourth Division semi-final)
- Average attendance: 16,094

The Football League play-offs for the 1987–88 season were held in May 1988, with the two-legged finals taking place at the finalists home stadiums. The play-off semi-finals were also played over two legs and were contested by the teams who finished in 3rd, 4th and 5th place in the Football League Second Division and Football League Third Division and the 4th, 5th, 6th placed teams in the Football League Fourth Division table, along with a team from the league above. The winners of the semi-finals progressed through to the finals, with the winner of these matches either gaining promotion or avoiding relegation for the following season.

== Background ==
The Football League play-offs have been held every year since 1987. They take place for each division following the conclusion of the regular season and are contested by the four clubs finishing below the automatic promotion places. For the first three seasons the final was played over two legs but this was changed to a single match at Wembley Stadium from 1990. Additionally, for the 1986–87 and 1987-88 play-offs the semi-finals included a team from the next league who had finished above the relegation positions up, e.g. one team from the first tier and three teams from the second tier. The team from the higher division would be relegated if they failed to win the play-offs, with the play-off winner being promoted in their place.

== Second Division ==
First Division relegation places

Pos	Team	Pld	W	D	L	GF	GA	GD	Pts
18	Chelsea	40	9	15	16	50	68	–18	42
19	Portsmouth	40	7	14	19	36	66	–30	35
20	Watford	40	7	11	22	27	51	–24	32
21	Oxford United	40	6	13	21	44	80	–36	31

Second Division play-off places

Pos	Team	Pld	W	D	L	GF	GA	GD	Pts
3	Middlesbrough	44	22	12	10	63	36	+27	78
4	Bradford City	44	22	11	11	74	54	+20	77
5	Blackburn Rovers	44	21	14	9	68	52	+16	77

=== Semi-finals ===
First leg

15 May 1988
12:00

Bradford City	2–1	Middlesbrough
Goddard 67'; McCall		Senior 68'

Valley Parade, Bradford
Attendance: 16,017
Referee: David Scott

15 May 1988
15:00

Blackburn Rovers	0–2	Chelsea
		Durie 46'; Nevin 68'

Ewood Park, Blackburn
Attendance: 16,568
Referee: John Key

Second leg

18 May 1988
19:30

Chelsea	4–1	Blackburn Rovers
K. Wilson 26', 77'; Dixon 55'; Durie 83'		Sellars 61'

Stamford Bridge, London
Attendance: 22,757
Referee: Allan Gunn

Chelsea won 6–1 on aggregate.

18 May 1988
19:30

Middlesbrough	2–0 (a.e.t.)	Bradford City
Slaven 35'; Hamilton 91'

Ayresome Park, Middlesbrough
Attendance: 25,868
Referee: Joe Worrall

Middlesbrough won 3–2 on aggregate.

=== Final ===
First leg

25 May 1988
19:30

Middlesbrough	2–0	Chelsea
Slaven 30'; Senior 81'

Ayresome Park, Middlesbrough
Attendance: 25,531
Referee: Keith Hackett

Second leg

28 May 1988
15:00

Chelsea	1–0	Middlesbrough
Durie 18'

Stamford Bridge, London
Attendance: 40,550
Referee: Brian Hill

Middlesbrough won 2–1 on aggregate and were promoted to the First Division. Chelsea was relegated to the Second Division.

== Third Division ==
Second Division relegation places

Pos	Team	Pld	W	D	L	GF	GA	GD	Pts
21	Sheffield United	44	13	7	24	45	74	–29	46
22	Reading	44	10	12	22	44	70	–26	42
23	Huddersfield Town	44	6	10	28	41	100	–59	28

Third Division play-off places

Pos	Team	Pld	W	D	L	GF	GA	GD	Pts
3	Walsall	46	23	13	10	68	50	+18	82
4	Notts County	46	23	12	11	82	49	+33	81
5	Bristol City	46	21	12	13	77	62	+15	75

=== Semi-finals ===
First leg

15 May 1988
15:30

Notts County	1–3	Walsall
Yates		Kelly; Shakespeare

Meadow Lane, Nottingham
Attendance: 11,522

15 May 1988
18:00

Bristol City	1–0	Sheffield United
Walsh

Ashton Gate, Bristol
Attendance: 25,335

Second leg

18 May 1988
19:30

Sheffield United	1–1	Bristol City
Morris 49'		Shutt 17'

Bramall Lane, Sheffield
Attendance: 19,056
Referee: George Courtney

Bristol City won 2–1 on aggregate.

18 May 1988
19:30

Walsall	1–1	Notts County
Christie 60'		Yates 12'

Fellows Park, Walsall
Attendance: 8,901

Walsall won 4–2 on aggregate.

=== Final ===
First leg

25 May 1988
19:45

Bristol City	1–3	Walsall
Walsh 40'		Christie 60'; Kelly 78', 90'

Ashton Gate, Bristol
Attendance: 25,128
Referee: Joe Worrall

Second leg

28 May 1988
15:00

Walsall	0–2	Bristol City
		Newman 31'; Shutt 64'

Fellows Park, Walsall
Attendance: 13,941
Referee: George Tyson

Walsall 3–3 Bristol City on aggregate - Walsall won 4-2 on pens to decide who would host the replay.

Replay

30 May 1988
15:00

Walsall	4–0	Bristol City
Kelly 12', 17', 63'; Hawker 19'

Fellows Park, Walsall
Attendance: 13,007
Referee: George Courtney

== Fourth Division ==
Third Division relegation places

Pos	Team	Pld	W	D	L	GF	GA	GD	Pts
21	Rotherham United	46	12	16	18	50	66	–16	52
22	Grimsby Town	46	12	14	20	48	58	–10	50
23	York City	46	8	9	29	48	91	–43	33
24	Doncaster Rovers	46	8	9	29	40	84	–44	33

Fourth Division play-off places

Pos	Team	Pld	W	D	L	GF	GA	GD	Pts
4	Scunthorpe United	46	20	17	9	76	51	+25	77
5	Torquay United	46	21	14	11	66	41	+25	77
6	Swansea City	46	20	10	16	62	56	+6	70

=== Semi-finals ===
First leg

15 May 1988
12:00

Torquay United	2–1	Scunthorpe United
Dobson; Caldwell		Flounders 71'

Plainmoor, Torquay
Attendance: 4,602

15 May 1988
15:00

Swansea City	1–0	Rotherham United
McCarthy 85'

Vetch Field, Swansea
Attendance: 9,148

Second leg

18 May 1988
19:30

Rotherham United	1–1	Swansea City
Johnson 46'		McCarthy 19'

Millmoor, Rotherham
Attendance: 5,558

Swansea City won 2–1 on aggregate.

18 May 1988
19:30

Scunthorpe United	1–1	Torquay United
Lister 81' (pen.)		Loram

Old Showground, Scunthorpe
Attendance: 6,483

Torquay United won 3–2 on aggregate.

=== Final ===
First leg

25 May 1988
19:30

Swansea City	2–1	Torquay United
McCarthy; Love 25'		McNichol 90'

Vetch Field, Swansea
Attendance: 10,825
Referee: Roger Milford

Second leg

28 May 1988
15:00

Torquay United	3–3	Swansea City
McNichol; Caldwell		Raynor; McCarthy .' (pen.); Davies

Plainmoor, Torquay
Attendance: 5,000

Swansea City won 5–4 on aggregate.
