= Darryl Yokley =

American musician (born 1982)

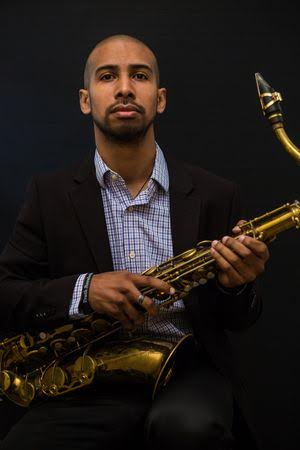

Background information
- Born: Darryl Yokley II; February 2, 1982 (age 44); Los Angeles, California, United States
- Genres: Jazz; Rhythm and blues Classical music
- Occupations: Musician, composer, arranger, educator, operations manager for Truth Revolution Recording Collective
- Instruments: Tenor saxophone Alto saxophone Soprano saxophone
- Years active: 2006–present
- Labels: Artist Recording Collective, Truth Revolution Recording Collective
- Member of: Sound Reformation
- Website: www.darrylyokley.com

Darryl Yokley II (born February 2, 1982) is an American tenor and alto saxophonist, composer and music conservatory teacher. Yokley started to learn jazz after extensive studies in classical saxophone. As a bandleader of Sound Reformation, Yokley has gained recognition as an inventive composer and soloist after releasing its debut album The Void (2012) and Pictures at an African Exhibition (2018). He has performed with Motown legends the Four Tops, The Temptations, and The O'Jays, Eddie Palmieri, Orrin Evans, The Captain Black Big Band, Duane Eubanks, Ralph Peterson Jr., Nasheet Waits, Valery Pomonarev, and many more.

== Biography ==
Bborn in Los Angeles, Yokley began his musical studies in his native state of California, starting at the age of ten on clarinet and moving to saxophone a year later upon entering middle school. He took quickly to the saxophone and the language of music, placing in honors bands for both classical and jazz. Yokley moved to North Carolina in high school and met his future saxophone professor James Houlik at a clinic in Lenoir, NC. It was then in 1997 that Yokley decided to focus solely on classical saxophone and it would be ten years before he truly rededicated himself to jazz. He attended Duquesne University for his undergraduate studies and Michigan State University for graduate studies. He studied with the aforementioned James Houlik as well as jazz saxophonist, composer and arranger, Mike Tomaro, and then later concert alto saxophonist Joseph Lulloff in Michigan as well as jazz composition with Derrick Gardner.

After graduating Michigan State University, Yokley started playing and touring with Motown legends the Four Tops, the Temptations, and the O'Jays. He moved to Philadelphia in 2007 to complete his “doctoral studies" from mentors such as Tim Warfield, Orrin Evans, Mike Boone, Sid Simmons, Mickey Roker, Edgar Bateman, and Byron Landham, performing frequently in Philadelphia. He moved to New York in 2009 and since then has performed with Eddie Palmieri, Orrin Evans, the Captain Black Big Band, Ralph Peterson Jr., Nasheet Waits, Valery Pomonarev, Jack Walrath, Frank Lacy, Duane Eubanks, Bill McHenry, and many others. He was also a member of the horn section and arranger for both the Captain Black Big Band and singer-songwriter, Rhonda Ross.

Yokley formed his band Sound Reformation in 2010. Their debut album The Void (2012) received favorable reviews from critics Brent Black and Charles Latimer. The band premiered a commissioned project for the Philadelphia Museum of Art in January 2015 which received much praise by critics and audience members alike, including the Philadelphia City Paper.

In addition to leading his own band, Yokley performs often in New York City and the surrounding area. Yokley was the special guest artist for the closing night awards ceremony at the 17th annual Arpa International Film Festival in Hollywood, he has performed for legendary musician and producer Quincy Jones, and has expanded to the international stage performing in South America, Europe, and multiple tours in Japan. He continues to perform as a soloist and chamber music musician having collaborated with colleagues at Westminster Conservatory as well as currently collaborating with pianist, Kyle Walker.

In 2018, Yokley released his second album with the Sound Reformation entitled Pictures at an African Exhibition accompanied by a small chamber wind ensemble. The project is also his first cross disciplinary collaboration with British born artist David Emmanuel Noel, who specifically produced original artwork for the album. The album received a significant amount of notoriety including write ups in The New York Times, a 3 1/2 star review in DownBeat, and his album was selected as the editors pick for Downbeat magazine. The albums success has allowed him to perform at the Kennedy Center in 2019, multiple east coast tours, and him and Sound Reformation have started touring on the West Coast since 2021.

Yokley continues to stay active as an educator teaching students of all levels and ages. He teaches privately where he helps students figure out a personalized approach to playing their instrument, whether it be saxophone, clarinet, or flute and he also serves as a clinician traveling all over the country. He also helps run Truth Revolution Recording Collective, where he has been the operations manager since 2021.

== Discography ==
- 2010: The Captain Black Big Band
- 2012: Darryl Yokley's Sound Reformation – The Void
- 2012: Together presented by Truth Revolution Records
- 2016: Rhonda Ross – In Case You Didn't Know
- 2018: Darryl Yokley's Sound Reformation – Pictures at an African Exhibition
- 2021: Spiritual Jazz 13 NOW! Part One / Modern Sounds for the 21st Century
- 2021: Truth Revolution Recording Collective – Together Again
- 2023: Voices of my People – We R the Church
