= Joe Worrall (referee) =

English football referee

- Full name: Joseph Bertram Worrall
- Born: 21 October 1945 (age 81); Warrington, Lancashire, England

Domestic
Years	League	Role
?–1973	Cheshire League	Referee
1976–1995	Football League	Referee

International
Years	League	Role
1981–1991	FIFA listed	Referee

Joseph Bertram Worrall (born 21 October 1945) is an English former football referee, who operated in the Football League and for FIFA. He comes from Warrington in Lancashire, and has the distinction of having refereed both of the major club competition Finals in England.

== Career ==
Worrall took up refereeing in 1964, at the age of 19, officiating in the Warrington and District Football League. He eventually progressed to the Cheshire County League. He was appointed a Football League linesman in 1973, a supplementary referee two years later and one year later gained promotion to the full Referees List in 1976 at the age of only thirty.

He was appointed as a FIFA referee in 1981, serving the world body for 11 years until 1991, when he had to step down due to age restrictions.

He was given control of the first of his two major domestic competition Finals on 24 April 1988, when Luton Town defeated Arsenal by three goals to two at Wembley in the League Cup final of that year. Worrall awarded Arsenal a penalty in the last ten minutes, with the score at 2–1 to the 'Gunners', but Nigel Winterburn failed to convert it.

On 20 May 1989, he stepped out again at Wembley to take charge of the FA Cup final between Liverpool and Everton, which finished 3–2 to Liverpool after extra time, the scores being tied at 1-1 after 90 minutes.

Worrall was the referee for the 1992 European Championships qualifier between Italy and Hungary at the Stadio Arechi, Salerno, on 1 May 1991. Italy were the victors by 3–1.

His last appointment on the FIFA list, and his highest international honour, was to referee the 1992 UEFA Cup final first leg at the Stadio Delle Alpi on 29 April 1992 between Torino of Italy and Ajax of the Netherlands. The score from that match was 2-2, but after a 0–0 draw in the second leg in Amsterdam, Ajax were declared winners on away goals.

== Retirement ==
He was appointed as one of the first Premier League referees in 1992. He reached the standard retirement age at the end of the 1993–1994 season but was granted a one-year extension as a result of his strong performances. He retired from refereeing at the end of the 1994–1995 season. However, he continued his involvement in the game by becoming a referees' assessor and match delegate.

Preceded by Brian Hill	FA Cup Final Referee; 1989	Succeeded by Allan Gunn
