= Fellows Park =

Old Walsall stadium

Coordinates: 52°34′16.13″N 1°59′50.70″W

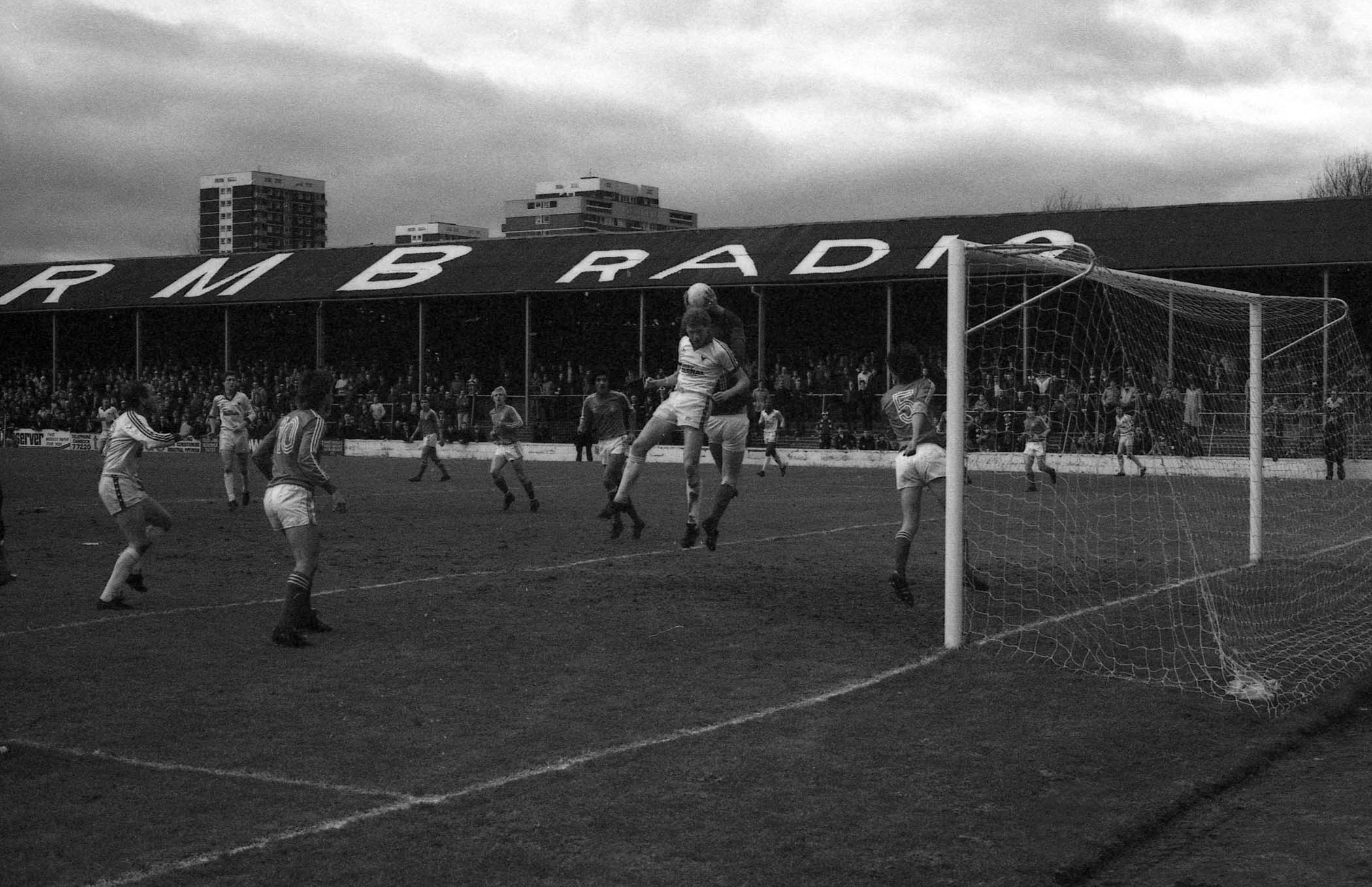
- Fellows Park in 1982
- Interactive map of Fellows Park
- Full name: Hilary Street (1896–1930); Fellows Park (1930–1990)
- Location: Hilary Street, Bescot, Walsall

Construction
- Closed: 1990

Tenant
- Walsall F.C. (1896–1990)

Fellows Park was a football stadium in Walsall, England. It was the home ground of Walsall F.C. from 1896 until 1990, when the team moved to the Bescot Stadium.

Fellows Park was situated about a quarter of a mile away from the club's present ground, The Bescot Stadium, at the junction of Hilary Street and Wallows Lane.

The club moved to the ground from West Bromwich Road in 1896. Until 1930 it was named Hilary Street, at which point it was renamed after H.L. Fellows, a club director. Walsall's record home attendance was at Fellows Park, when 25,453 spectators were present for the team's Second Division match against Newcastle United on 29 August 1961.

By March 1988, the club was planning to build a new stadium at nearby Bescot Crescent. Within two years, construction work was underway at the new stadium site and the last league game at Fellows Park was played on 1 May 1990, when Walsall, in the process of their second successive relegation which took them into the Football League Fourth Division, drew 1–1 at home to Rotherham United, with Andy Dornan scoring the last league goal at the ground – his only goal in his time at Walsall.

The final game played at the ground was on 11 May 1990, when retiring defender Peter Hart's testimonial was held there with local rivals West Bromwich Albion providing the opposition. This game also ended in a 1–1 draw, with Gary Shaw scoring an equaliser for Walsall in the 37th minute, thus going down in history as the last player to score at the stadium, in its 94-year history. The new Bescot Stadium was ready for the 1990–91 season. A reminder of Fellows Park remains in the new stadium, in the name of the H.L. Fellows Stand. The old stadium was demolished in early 1991 and a Morrisons supermarket built on the site.

In December 1990, several weeks before the stadium's demolition, heavy snow caused the roof of the "cowshed" section of the stadium to collapse.
