= List of Walsall F.C. seasons =

R

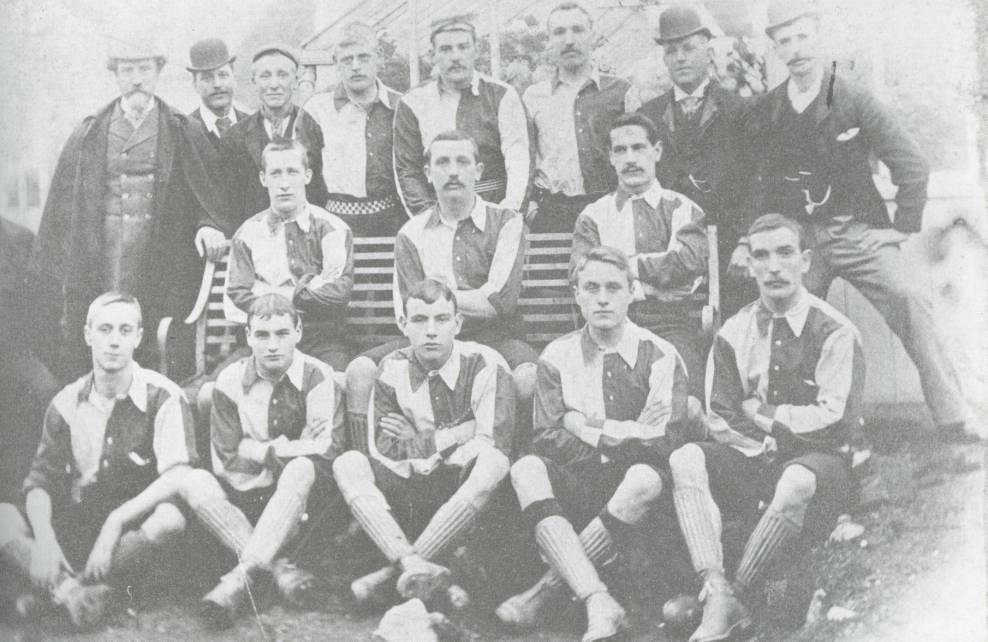
The Walsall team of 1893

Walsall Football Club was formed in 1888 when Walsall Town and Walsall Swifts amalgamated. They joined the Football League in 1892, as founder members of the new Second Division.

The table below details the club's achievements in all national competitions and records their average attendance and top goalscorer for each completed league season.

== Key ==
Key to league record:

- P = Games played
- W = Won
- D = Drawn
- L = Lost
- F = Goals for
- A = Goals against
- Pts = Points
- Pos = Final position

Key to rounds:

- 1Q = 1st qualifying round
- 2Q = 2nd qualifying round
- 3Q = 3rd qualifying round
- 4Q = 4th qualifying round
- 5Q = 5th qualifying round
- 6Q = 6th qualifying round
- IR = Intermediate round
- PR = Preliminary round
- R1 = Round 1
- R2 = Round 2
- R3 = Round 3
- R4 = Round 4
- R5 = Round 5
- QF = Quarter-finals
- SF = Semi-finals
- AR1 = Area round 1
- AR2 = Area round 2
- AQF = Area quarter-finals
- ASF = Area semi-finals
- AF = Area final

== Seasons ==
Season	League										FA Cup	League Cup	Other Cup (Note: Birmingham Senior Cup 1888–1905, Third Division North Cup 1934–36, Third Division South Cup 1936–46 and EFL Trophy (under various names) 1983–present.)	Average att. (Note: Average attendance taken from league matches only.)	Top goalscorer (Note: Top goalscorer statistics include goals scored in league matches only.)	
Season	Tier	Division	P	W	D	L	F	A	Pts	Pos	FA Cup	League Cup	Other Cup	Average att.	Name	Gls
1888–89	–	Midland Association (Note: In the same year an attempt was made to set up a league called The Combination involving clubs not invited to join The Football League. Lack of proper organisation meant it materialised into a series of friendly matches without proper league structure and wound up in April 1889.)	14	8	2	4	28	32	18	–	R2 (Note: Walsall have competed in the FA Cup every season since their formation in 1888. Both preceding clubs, Walsall Town and Walsall Swifts, also both competed in each season from 1882–83 until the amalgamation.)	–	R2	1,643	Sammy Holmes	7
1889–90	–	Football Alliance (Note: The Football Alliance was formed in 1889 by 12 clubs as an alternative to the Football League. Walsall Town Swifts were founder members.)	22	8	3	11	44	59	19	9th	4Q	–	SF	2,100	Sammy Holmes	12
1890–91	–	Football Alliance	22	9	3	10	34	61	21	7th	4Q	–	R1	3,090	Sammy Holmes	11
1891–92	–	Football Alliance	22	6	3	13	33	59	15	11th	2Q	–	R1	2,636	Sammy Holmes	9
1892–93	2	Division 2 (Note: The Second Division was formed in 1892 largely by clubs who had been competing in the Football Alliance. Walsall Town Swifts were founder members.)	22	5	3	14	37	75	13	12th (Note: Having finished in last place, Walsall Town Swifts had to reapply for their place in the league. They were re-elected and following expansion to 16 teams, joined in the Second Division by Liverpool, Newcastle United and Woolwich Arsenal.)	3Q	–	R1	1,310	Norman Forsyth	7
1892–93	2	Division 2	22	5	3	14	37	75	13	12th	3Q	–	R1	1,310	Sammy Holmes	7
1892–93	2	Division 2	22	5	3	14	37	75	13	12th	3Q	–	R1	1,310	Joe Turner	7
1893–94	2	Division 2	28	10	3	15	51	61	23	10th	3Q	–	R1	3,100	Walt McWhinnie	11
1894–95	2	Division 2	30	10	0	20	47	92	20	14th (Note: Having finished in the bottom four, Walsall Town Swifts again had to reapply for their place in the league. They were not re-elected and replaced in the league by Loughborough Town.)	1Q	–	R1	2,200	Will Devey	7
1895–96	–	Midland League	28	17	6	5	92	48	40	3rd	3Q	–	R2	1,736	David Copeland	21
1896–97	2	Division 2 (Note: Walsall (having dropped the Town Swifts in their name) elected back to the Football League for the 1896–97 season, joining Blackpool and Gainsborough Trinity in replacing Burslem Port Vale, Crewe Alexandra and Rotherham Town.)	30	11	4	15	53	69	26	12th	4Q	–	W (Note: Walsall beat Wolves 2–1 in the final of the Birmingham Senior Cup.)	3,950	Alf Griffin	12
1897–98	2	Division 2	30	12	5	13	58	58	29	10th	R1	–	W (Note: Retained the Birmingham Senior Cup by beating Wolves 3–0 in the final.)	2,900	Jack Aston	12
1897–98	2	Division 2	30	12	5	13	58	58	29	10th	R1	–	W	2,900	George Johnson	12
1898–99	2	Division 2	34	15	12	7	79	36	42	6th (Note: Highest ever league position. With 18 teams in the First Division, Walsall were placed 24th nationally – the equivalent of 4th place in the modern day Championship.)	3Q	–	R3	3,710	Jack Aston	16
1898–99	2	Division 2	34	15	12	7	79	36	42	6th	3Q	–	R3	3,710	Tommy Vail	16
1899–1900	2	Division 2	34	12	8	14	50	55	32	12th	R1	–	R2	3,200	Jim Moffatt	13
1900–01	2	Division 2	34	7	13	14	40	56	27	16th (Note: Having finished in the bottom three, Walsall had to reapply to the Football League. They were not re-elected and replaced in the league by Bristol City. This would begin the club's twenty year absence from league football.)	IR	–	SF	3,015	Alfred Dean	11
1901–02	–	Midland League	28	14	7	7	51	37	35	5th	R2	–	R1	1,750	Alf Green	12
1902–03	–	Midland League (Note: Reapplied for a place in the Football League in 1902–03 but were not elected.)	32	12	7	13	52	48	31	9th	2Q	–	SF	1,450	Reg Bastock	8
1903–04	–	B'ham DL	34	11	7	16	45	65	29	13th	5Q	–	DNE	1,306	Laurie Pember	10
1904–05	–	B'ham DL	34	11	6	17	44	77	28	14th	Q2	–	PR (Note: From 1905 the larger clubs in the region, including Walsall and other Football League clubs, were allowed to enter their reserve sides in the Birmingham Senior Cup and invariably did so. Therefore, results beyond this year are not included in the seasons records.)	1,318	Jimmy Ellard	9
1905–06	–	B'ham DL	34	7	6	21	42	89	20	16th	4Q	–	–	1,741	Tommy Holt	13
1906–07	–	B'ham DL	34	14	4	16	58	79	32	13th	1Q	–	–	1,820	Alfred Hunt	14
1907–08	–	B'ham DL	34	15	3	16	67	72	33	10th	1Q	–	–	2,550	Gilbert Bytheway	16
1908–09	–	B'ham DL	34	10	8	16	47	56	28	15th	1Q	–	–	2,835	Sid Francis	12
1909–10	–	B'ham DL	34	18	7	9	66	44	43	5th	PR	–	–	3,294	Billy Caddick	18
1910–11	–	B'ham DL SL Div 2 (Note: Elected to the Southern League Division 2 in 1910–11 but continued to play in the Birmingham & District League.)	34 22	20 7	6 4	8 11	60 37	44 41	46 18	3rd 9th	1Q	–	–	2,959	Hubert Parsonage	13
1911–12	–	B'ham DL SL Div 2 (Note: Left the Southern League at end of the 1911–12 season and continued to play in only the Birmingham & District League.)	34 26 (Note: Home match against Cwm Albion in April 1912 was not played as Cwm could not complete their fixtures. Walsall were awarded the win.)	17 14	7 1	10 11	56 44	34 41	41 27	4th 6th	R1	–	–	2,640	W. Freeman	18
1912–13	–	B'ham DL	34	15	5	14	60	54	35	7th	5Q	–	–	2,356	Amos Baddeley	16
1913–14	–	B'ham DL	34	13	8	13	48	61	34	10th	1Q	–	–	2,582	C. Crossley	16
1914–15	–	B'ham DL	34	21	5	8	66	44	47	3rd	5Q	–	–	2,494	Arthur Campey	20
The Football League and FA Cup were suspended until after the First World War.
1919–20	–	B'ham DL	34	11	6	17	53	62	28	16th	5Q	–	–	3,673	Jack Radford	12
1920–21	–	B'ham DL (Note: Applied for a place in the Football League in 1920–21 but were not elected.)	34	18	6	10	68	47	42	5th	1Q	–	–	7,512	Ernie Edwards	21
1921–22	3	Division 3 (N) (Note: The Third Division North was formed in 1921 from several regional leagues including the Birmingham & District League. Walsall were founder members and re-joined the Football League after a twenty year absence.)	38	18	3	17	66	65	39	8th	R1	–	–	7,400	Paddy Reid	21
1922–23	3	Division 3 (N)	38	19	8	11	51	44	46	3rd	6Q	–	–	6,440	Teddy Groves	13
1923–24	3	Division 3 (N)	42	14	8	20	44	59	36	17th	6Q	–	–	5,075	Teddy Groves	11
1924–25	3	Division 3 (N)	42	13	11	18	44	53	37	19th	5Q	–	–	4,810	Fred Burrill	14
1925–26	3	Division 3 (N)	42	10	6	26	58	107	26	21st (Note: Forced to reapply to the Football League for the 1926–27 season but were comfortably re-elected with 33 votes.)	R1	–	–	3,368	Harry Crockford	17
1926–27	3	Division 3 (N)	42	14	10	18	68	81	38	14th	R3	–	–	4,728	Bert White	24
1927–28	3	Division 3 (S)	42	12	9	21	75	101	33	18th	R1	–	–	6,580	Moses Lane	36
1928–29	3	Division 3 (S)	42	13	12	17	73	79	38	14th	R3	–	–	6,527	Moses Lane	15
1929–30	3	Division 3 (S)	42	13	8	21	71	78	34	17th	R4	–	–	5,607	Albert Walters	25
1930–31	3	Division 3 (S)	42	14	9	19	78	95	37	17th	R3	–	–	5,091	Johnny Eyres	16
1931–32	3	Division 3 (N)	40	16	3	21	57	85	35	16th	R1	–	–	3,490	Gilbert Alsop	15
1932–33	3	Division 3 (N)	42	19	10	13	75	58	48	5th	R4	–	–	5,279	Gilbert Alsop	28
1933–34	3	Division 3 (N)	42	23	7	12	97	60	53	4th	R2	–	–	6,228	Gilbert Alsop	39
1934–35	3	Division 3 (N)	42	13	10	19	81	72	36	14th	R3	–	F (Note: Reached the final of the Third Division North Cup, losing 2–0 to Stockport County at Maine Road.)	5,645	Gilbert Alsop	39
1935–36	3	Division 3 (N)	42	16	9	17	79	59	41	10th	R3	–	R2	6,551	Bill Evans	24
1936–37	3	Division 3 (S)	42	13	10	19	63	85	36	17th	R4	–	R1	5,672	Bill Evans	15
1937–38	3	Division 3 (S)	42	11	7	24	52	88	29	21st (Note: Forced to reapply to the Football League for the 1938–39 season but were re-elected with 34 votes.)	R2	–	R2	4,564	Bill Evans	9
1938–39	3	Division 3 (S)	42	11	11	20	68	69	33	21st (Note: Forced to reapply to the Football League for the 1939–40 season and were re-elected with 36 votes.)	R5	–	R1	7,364	Gilbert Alsop	23
1939–40 (Note: 1939–40 season was abandoned after 3 league matches due to the Second World War and all results were annulled.)	3	Division 3 (S)	3	1	1	1	3	3	3	–	–	–	–	–	–	–
The Football League and FA Cup were suspended until after the Second World War.
1945–46	N/A										R1 (Note: The FA Cup was contested in 1945–46 but the Football League did not resume until the following season.)	–	F (Note: The Third Division North and South Cup was revived in 1946. In each regional section 11 teams played on a league basis, with the first two places in each region then contesting the semi-finals of a knockout competition. Walsall reached the final where they lost 1–0 to Bournemouth at Stamford Bridge.)	–	–	–
1946–47	3	Division 3 (S)	42	17	12	13	74	59	46	5th	R3	–	–	11,173	Dennis Wilshaw	18
1947–48	3	Division 3 (S)	42	21	9	12	70	40	51	3rd	R3	–	–	15,711	Dave Massart	23
1948–49	3	Division 3 (S)	42	15	8	19	56	64	38	14th	R4	–	–	10,772	Phil Chapman	25
1949–50	3	Division 3 (S)	42	9	16	17	61	62	34	19th	R1	–	–	10,099	Johnny Devlin	22
1950–51	3	Division 3 (S)	46	15	10	21	52	62	40	15th	R1	–	–	8,788	Don Dearson	10
1950–51	3	Division 3 (S)	46	15	10	21	52	62	40	15th	R1	–	–	8,788	Jack Winter	10
1951–52	3	Division 3 (S)	46	13	5	28	55	94	31	24th (Note: Forced to reapply to the Football League for the 1952–53 season and were re-elected with 45 votes.)	R1	–	–	7,084	Hugh Evans	12
1951–52	3	Division 3 (S)	46	13	5	28	55	94	31	24th	R1	–	–	7,084	Billy O'Neill	12
1952–53	3	Division 3 (S)	46	7	10	29	56	118	24	24th (Note: For the second season in a row, Walsall were forced to reapply to the Football League and were re-elected with 41 votes.)	R1	–	–	5,992	Jack Bridgett	10
1953–54	3	Division 3 (S)	46	9	8	29	40	87	26	24th (Note: For the third season in a row, Walsall were forced to reapply to the Football League and were re-elected with 32 votes.)	R3	–	–	9,278	George Dean	10
1953–54	3	Division 3 (S)	46	9	8	29	40	87	26	24th	R3	–	–	9,278	Fred Morris	10
1954–55	3	Division 3 (S)	46	10	14	22	75	86	34	23rd (Note: Walsall were forced to reapply to the Football League for the fourth season in a row ahead of the 1955–56 season and were re-elected with 33 votes. This was the tenth and final election the club had to face.)	R3	–	–	11,201	Tony Richards	22
1955–56	3	Division 3 (S)	46	15	8	23	68	84	38	20th	R3	–	–	12,644	Tony Richards	15
1956–57	3	Division 3 (S)	46	16	12	18	80	74	44	15th	R1	–	–	11,347	Don Dorman	18
1957–58	3	Division 3 (S)	46	14	9	23	61	75	37	20th	R1	–	–	8,802	Tony Richards	21
1958–59	4	Division 4 (Note: The Fourth Division was created in 1958 by merging the regionalised Third Division North and South. The 12 best teams of each regional league in 1957–58 remained in the nationalised Third Division and the rest, including Walsall, became founder members of the Fourth Division. This gave Walsall the distinction of being founder members of Second, Third and Fourth tiers in the Football League.)	46	21	10	15	95	64	52	6th	R1	–	–	9,050	Tony Richards	28
1959–60	4	Division 4	46	28	9	9	102	60	65	1st↑	R2	–	–	11,157	Tony Richards	24
1960–61	3	Division 3	46	28	6	12	98	60	62	2nd↑	R1	R2 (Note: The League Cup was introduced in the 1960–61 season specifically as a mid-week floodlit tournament, to replace the Southern Professional Floodlit Cup.)	–	10,827	Tony Richards	36
1961–62	2	Division 2	42	14	11	17	70	75	39	14th	R4	R2	–	12,703	Colin Taylor	17
1962–63	2	Division 2	42	11	9	22	53	89	31	21st↓	R3	R2	–	9,824	Colin Taylor	10
1963–64	3	Division 3	46	13	14	19	59	76	40	19th	R1	R3	–	7,308	Graham Matthews	15
1964–65	3	Division 3	46	15	7	24	55	80	37	19th	R1	R1	–	6,754	Allan Clarke	23
1965–66	3	Division 3	46	20	10	16	77	64	50	9th	R4	R2	–	9,297	Allan Clarke	18
1966–67	3	Division 3	46	18	10	18	65	72	46	12th	R3	R4	–	8,594	Alan Baker	13
1966–67	3	Division 3	46	18	10	18	65	72	46	12th	R3	R4	–	8,594	Colin Taylor	13
1967–68	3	Division 3	46	19	12	15	74	61	50	7th	R4	R2	–	9,119	Jimmy Murray	11
1967–68	3	Division 3	46	19	12	15	74	61	50	7th	R4	R2	–	9,119	Colin Taylor	11
1968–69	3	Division 3	46	14	16	16	50	49	44	13th	R3	R2	–	5,867	Geoff Morris	9
1968–69	3	Division 3	46	14	16	16	50	49	44	13th	R3	R2	–	5,867	Dave Wilson	9
1969–70	3	Division 3	46	17	12	17	54	67	46	12th	R3	R1	–	5,428	Colin Taylor	9
1970–71	3	Division 3	46	14	11	21	51	57	39	20th	R2	R2	–	5,212	Colin Taylor	13
1971–72	3	Division 3	46	15	18	13	62	57	48	9th	R4	R1	–	5,445	Geoff Morris	11
1972–73	3	Division 3	46	18	7	21	56	66	43	17th	R2	R1	–	4,803	Chris Jones	11
1973–74	3	Division 3	46	16	13	17	57	48	45	15th	R2	R2	–	4,789	Alan Buckley	21
1974–75	3	Division 3	46	18	13	15	67	52	49	8th	R5	R1	–	6,268	Alan Buckley	21
1975–76	3	Division 3	46	18	14	14	74	61	50	7th	R1	R1	–	5,618	Alan Buckley	34
1976–77	3	Division 3	46	13	15	18	57	65	41	15th	R3	R2	–	5,498	Alan Buckley	20
1977–78	3	Division 3	46	18	17	11	61	50	53	6th	R5	R3	–	5,317	Alan Buckley	24
1978–79	3	Division 3	46	10	12	24	56	71	32	22nd↓	R1	R2	–	4,047	Terry Austin	13
1979–80	4	Division 4	46	23	18	5	75	47	64	2nd↑	R2	R1	–	5,549	Don Penn	25
1980–81	3	Division 3	46	13	15	18	59	74	41	20th	R2	R1	–	4,265	Alan Buckley	11
1981–82	3	Division 3	46	13	14	19	51	55	53	20th	R2	R1	–	3,744	Don Penn	14
1982–83	3	Division 3	46	17	13	16	64	63	64	10th	R3	R1	–	3,243	Alan Buckley	13
1983–84	3	Division 3	46	22	9	15	68	61	75	6th	R1	SF	AR2 (Note: Associate Members' Cup introduced for third and fourth tier teams for the 1983–84 season. In 1992 it was renamed the Football League Trophy and renamed again as the EFL Trophy in 2016.)	5,017	Alistair Brown	13
1984–85	3	Division 3	46	18	13	15	58	52	67	11th	R3	R3	AQF	4,812	Richard O'Kelly	16
1985–86	3	Division 3	46	22	9	15	90	64	75	6th	R3	R2	PR	4,891	Nicky Cross	21
1986–87	3	Division 3	46	22	9	15	80	67	75	8th	R5	R2	AR1	5,313	David Kelly	23
1987–88	3	Division 3	46	23	13	10	68	50	82	3rd↑ (Note: Won promotion by beating Bristol City 4–0 in a replayed play-off final at Fellows Park. The original tie was played over two legs and ended 3–3 with a penalty shootout to decide the venue of the replay, which Walsall won.)	R2	R2	AR1	5,598	David Kelly	20
1988–89	2	Division 2	46	5	16	25	41	80	31	24th↓	R3	R2	–	6,108	Stuart Rimmer	8
1989–90	3	Division 3	46	9	14	23	40	72	41	24th↓	R3	R1	ASF	4,077	Stuart Rimmer	10
1990–91	4	Division 4	46	12	17	17	48	51	53	16th	R2	R2	AR1	4,149	Stuart Rimmer	13
1991–92	4	Division 4	42	12	13	17	48	58	49	15th	R1	R1	AQF	3,367	Rod McDonald	17
1992–93	4	Division 3 (Note: The Fourth Division was renamed the Third Division after the Premier League was formed and broke away from the Football League.)	42	22	7	13	76	61	73	5th (Note: Lost 3–9 on aggregate to Crewe in the play-off semi-final.)	R1	R2	AR2	3,628	Wayne Clarke	21
1993–94	4	Division 3	42	17	9	16	48	53	60	10th	R2	R1	AR1	4,237	Kyle Lightbourne	7
1994–95	4	Division 3	42	24	11	7	75	40	83	2nd↑	R3	R2	AR1	4,071	Kyle Lightbourne	23
1995–96	3	Division 2	46	19	12	15	60	45	69	11th	R4	R1	AR2	3,982	Kyle Lightbourne	15
1995–96	3	Division 2	46	19	12	15	60	45	69	11th	R4	R1	AR2	3,982	Kevin Wilson	15
1996–97	3	Division 2	46	19	10	17	54	53	67	12th	R2	R1	AR2	3,892	Kyle Lightbourne	20
1997–98	3	Division 2	46	14	12	20	43	52	54	19th	R4	R4	AF	4,062	Roger Boli	12
1998–99	3	Division 2	46	26	9	11	63	47	87	2nd↑	R2	R1	AF	5,457	Andy Rammell	18
1999–2000	2	Division 1	46	11	13	22	52	77	46	22nd↓	R3	R2	–	6,779	Michael Ricketts	11
2000–01	3	Division 2	46	23	12	11	79	50	81	4th↑ (Note: Won promotion by beating Reading 3–2 after extra-time in the play-off final at the Millennium Stadium in Cardiff. It was the first year the play-off finals were held in Cardiff following the closure of Wembley Stadium for redevelopment.)	R3	R2	AQF	5,632	Jorge Leitão	18
2001–02	2	Division 1	46	13	12	21	51	71	51	18th	R5	R2	–	6,832	Jorge Leitão	8
2002–03	2	Division 1	46	15	9	22	57	69	54	17th	R5	R3	–	6,978	José Júnior	15
2003–04	2	Division 1	46	13	12	21	45	65	51	22nd↓	R3	R2	–	7,853	Jorge Leitão	7
2004–05	3	League 1 (Note: The Second Division was renamed and rebranded League 1 from the start of the 2004–05 season, along with the Championship and League 2.)	46	16	12	18	65	69	60	14th	R1	R1	AQF	6,108	Matty Fryatt	15
2005–06	3	League 1	46	11	14	21	47	70	47	24th↓	R4	R1	ASF	5,392	Matty Fryatt	11
2006–07	4	League 2	46	25	14	7	66	34	89	1st↑	R1	R2	AR1	5,716	Dean Keates	13
2007–08	3	League 1	46	16	16	14	52	46	64	12th	R3	R1	AR1	5,620	Tommy Mooney	11
2008–09	3	League 1	46	17	10	19	61	66	61	13th	R1	R1	AQF	4,572	Michael Ricketts	12
2009–10	3	League 1	46	16	14	16	60	63	62	10th	R2	R1	AR1	4,029	Troy Deeney	14
2010–11	3	League 1	46	12	12	22	56	75	48	20th	R2	R1	AR1	3,846	Julian Gray	10
2011–12	3	League 1	46	10	20	16	51	57	50	19th	R2	R1	AR2	4,274	Jon Macken	7
2011–12	3	League 1	46	10	20	16	51	57	50	19th	R2	R1	AR2	4,274	Alex Nicholls	7
2012–13	3	League 1	46	17	17	12	65	58	68	9th	R1	R2	AR2	4,234	Will Grigg	19
2013–14	3	League 1	46	14	16	16	49	49	58	13th	R2	R2	AR1	4,807	Craig Westcarr	14
2014–15	3	League 1	46	14	17	15	50	54	59	14th	R1	R2	F (Note: Walsall reached the final of the Football League Trophy, losing 2–0 to Bristol City at Wembley Stadium. It was the club's first appearance at the National Stadium in their 127-year history.)	4,392	Tom Bradshaw	17
2015–16	3	League 1	46	24	12	10	71	49	84	3rd (Note: Lost 1–6 on aggregate to Barnsley in the play-off semi-final.)	R4	R3	AR1	5,382	Tom Bradshaw	17
2016–17	3	League 1	46	14	16	16	51	58	58	14th	R1	R1	R2	5,072	Erhun Öztumer	15
2017–18	3	League 1	46	13	13	20	53	66	52	19th	R1	R1	R2	4,760	Erhun Öztumer	15
2018–19	3	League 1	46	12	11	23	49	71	47	22nd↓	R3	R2	R2	4,927	Andy Cook	13
2019–20	4	League 2	36 (Note: The League Two season was delayed on 13 March 2020 due to the COVID-19 pandemic. League Two clubs voted by an overwhelming majority to formally end the 2019–20 season on 9 June 2020, with the final standings to be determined by point-per-game ratios.)	13	8	15	40	49	47	12th (Note: With an overall PPG of 1.31, Walsall finished in 12th place.)	R2	R1	R3	4,664	Josh Gordon	9
2020–21	4	League 2	46	11	20	15	45	53	53	19th	R1	R1	Grp	0 (Note: Due to the ongoing COVID-19 pandemic all matches were played behind closed doors with no spectators.)	Elijah Adebayo	10
2021–22	4	League 2	46	14	12	20	47	60	54	16th	R2	R1	R2	4,979	George Miller	12
2022–23	4	League 2	46	12	19	15	46	49	55	16th	R4	R2	Grp	5,540	Danny Johnson	12
2023–24	4	League 2	46	18	11	17	69	73	65	11th	R3	R1	Grp	5,618	Isaac Hutchinson	12
2024–25	4	League 2	46	21	14	11	75	54	77	4th (Note: Lost 0–1 to AFC Wimbledon in the play-off final.)	R2	R3	R3	6,319	Nathan Lowe	15
2025–26	4	League 2	46	18	11	17	56	56	65	13th	R3	R1	R3	6,356	Daniel Kanu	15

=== Overall ===
- Seasons spent in First Division / Premier League (1st tier): 0
- Seasons spent in Second Division / Championship (2nd tier): 15 (1892–95, 1896–01, 1961–63, 1988–89, 1999–00, 2001–04)
- Seasons spent in Third Division / League One (3rd tier): 75 (1921–58, 1960–61, 1963–79, 1980–88, 1989–90, 1995–99, 2000–01, 2004–06, 2007–19)
- Seasons spent in Fourth Division / League Two (4th tier): 15 (1958–60, 1979–80, 1990–95, 2006–07, 2019–)

Correct up to end of 2024–25 season.
