= 1996–97 Walsall F.C. season =

Walsall
1996–97 season
- Chairman: Scott Davidson
- Manager: Chris Nicholl
- Stadium: Bescot Stadium
- Second Division: 12th
- FA Cup: Second round
- League Cup: First round
- Football League Trophy: Second round
- Top goalscorer: League: Lightbourne (20); All: Lightbourne (25)
- Average home league attendance: 3,892
Home colours

During the 1996–97 English football season, Walsall F.C. competed in the Football League Second Division.

== Season summary ==
In the 1996–97 season, Walsall had another satisfying mid-table finish under Nicholl, ending the season in 12th place. At the end of the season, Nicholl resigned because of family reasons.

== Final league table ==
Pos	Team	Pld	W	D	L	GF	GA	GD	Pts
10	Chesterfield	46	18	14	14	42	39	+3	68
11	Gillingham	46	19	10	17	60	59	+1	67
12	Walsall	46	19	10	17	54	53	+1	67
13	Watford	46	16	19	11	45	38	+7	67
14	Millwall	46	16	13	17	50	55	−5	61

Rules for classification: In the Football League goals scored (GF) takes precedence over goal difference (GD).

== Results ==
Walsall's score comes first

=== Legend ===
Win	Draw	Loss

=== Football League Second Division ===
Date	Opponent	Venue	Result	Attendance	Scorers
17 August 1996	Rotherham United	H	1–1	4,040	Butler
24 August 1996	Burnley	A	1–2	10,322	Wilson
27 August 1996	Chesterfield	A	0–1	3,561	
7 September 1996	Blackpool	A	1–2	5,176	Blake
10 September 1996	Wycombe Wanderers	H	2–2	2,659	Wilson, Watson
14 September 1996	Gillingham	H	1–0	3,419	Viveash
21 September 1996	Bristol City	A	1–4	7,412	Lightbourne
24 September 1996	Wrexham	H	0–1	2,832	
28 September 1996	Bury	H	3–1	3,254	Viveash, Lightbourne, Blake
1 October 1996	Bournemouth	A	1–0	2,747	Hodge
5 October 1996	Luton Town	A	1–3	5,002	Lightbourne
12 October 1996	Plymouth Argyle	H	0–1	3,720	
15 October 1996	Preston North End	H	1–0	3,224	Wilson
19 October 1996	Brentford	A	1–1	5,419	Lightbourne
26 October 1996	Stockport County	H	1–1	3,767	Wilson (pen)
29 October 1996	Notts County	A	0–2	3,127	
2 November 1996	Millwall	A	0–1	9,176	
9 November 1996	Peterborough United	H	4–0	3,921	Lightbourne (2), Wilson (pen), Donowa
23 November 1996	Crewe Alexandra	H	1–0	3,653	Wilson
30 November 1996	Stockport County	A	0–2	5,333	
3 December 1996	Bristol Rovers	H	1–0	4,084	Viveash
14 December 1996	Watford	H	1–1	3,674	Keister
20 December 1996	Shrewsbury Town	A	2–2	3,007	Viveash, Wilson
26 December 1996	Wycombe Wanderers	A	2–0	5,073	Blake, Lightbourne
18 January 1997	Bournemouth	H	2–1	3,037	Viveash, Lightbourne
25 January 1997	Notts County	H	3–1	3,261	Viveash, Ntamark, Hodge
1 February 1997	Peterborough United	A	1–0	4,940	Watson
8 February 1997	Millwall	H	2–1	3,833	Watson, Viveash
11 February 1997	York City	A	2–0	2,136	Lightbourne, Viveash
15 February 1997	Crewe Alexandra	A	0–1	4,648	
22 February 1997	York City	H	1–1	3,664	Lightbourne
1 March 1997	Bristol Rovers	A	1–0	5,891	Watson
4 March 1997	Bristol City	H	2–0	4,322	Lightbourne (2)
8 March 1997	Shrewsbury Town	H	2–2	4,819	Lightbourne, Ricketts
15 March 1997	Watford	A	0–1	7,818	
18 March 1997	Blackpool	H	1–1	3,459	Hodge
22 March 1997	Burnley	H	1–3	6,306	Lightbourne
29 March 1997	Rotherham United	A	2–1	2,428	Lightbourne, Viveash
1 April 1997	Chesterfield	H	1–1	3,784	Blake
5 April 1997	Wrexham	A	2–1	3,266	Lightbourne, Watson
8 April 1997	Bury	A	1–2	4,082	Lightbourne
12 April 1997	Luton Town	H	3–2	5,415	Lightbourne (2), Hodge
19 April 1997	Plymouth Argyle	A	0–2	5,535	
26 April 1997	Brentford	H	1–0	5,359	Lightbourne
29 April 1997	Gillingham	A	0–2	4,095	
3 May 1997	Preston North End	A	0–2	10,800	

=== FA Cup ===
Round	Date	Opponent	Venue	Result	Attendance	Goalscorers
R1	16 November 1996	Northwich Victoria	A	2–2	3,142	Wilson, Lightbourne
R1R	26 November 1996	Northwich Victoria	H	3–1	3,491	Lightbourne (2), Wilson (pen)
R2	7 December 1996	Burnley	H	1–1	5,031	Lightbourne
R2R	23 December 1996	Burnley	A	1–1 (lost 2–4 on pens)	5,799	Viveash

=== League Cup ===
Round	Date	Opponent	Venue	Result	Attendance	Goalscorers
R1 1st Leg	20 August 1996	Watford	H	1–0	2,659	Lightbourne
R1 2nd Leg	3 September 1996	Watford	A	0–2 (lost 1–2 on agg)	5,325	

=== Football League Trophy ===
Round	Date	Opponent	Venue	Result	Attendance	Goalscorers
SR2	21 January 1997	Peterborough United	A	0–2	2,274	

== Squad ==
Note: Flags indicate national team as defined under FIFA eligibility rules; some limited exceptions apply. Players may hold more than one non-FIFA nationality.

No.	Pos.	Nation	Player
—	GK	(England) ENG	Jimmy Walker
—	GK	(Northern Ireland) NIR	Trevor Wood
—	DF	(England) ENG	Ray Daniel
—	DF	(Wales) WAL	Wayne Evans
—	DF	(England) ENG	Chris Marsh
—	DF	(England) ENG	Derek Mountfield
—	DF	(England) ENG	Darren Rogers
—	DF	(England) ENG	Ian Roper
—	DF	(England) ENG	Stuart Ryder
—	DF	(England) ENG	Adi Viveash
—	MF	(England) ENG	Mark Blake
—	MF	(England) ENG	Darren Bradley
—	MF	(England) ENG	Louie Donowa

No.	Pos.	Nation	Player
—	MF	(England) ENG	Dean Keates
—	MF	(Sierra Leone) SLE	John Keister
—	MF	(Cameroon) CMR	Charlie Ntamark
—	MF	(England) ENG	Wayne Thomas
—	FW	(England) ENG	Darren Beckford
—	FW	(England) ENG	Martin Butler
—	FW	(England) ENG	John Hodge
—	FW	(Bermuda) BER	Kyle Lightbourne
—	FW	(England) ENG	Clive Platt
—	FW	(England) ENG	Michael Ricketts
—	FW	(England) ENG	Andy Watson
—	FW	(England) ENG	Kevin Wilson
