= 1997–98 Walsall F.C. season =

Walsall
1997–98 season
- Chairman: Jeff Bonser
- Manager: Jan Sørensen
- Stadium: Bescot Stadium
- Second Division: 19th
- FA Cup: Fourth round
- League Cup: Fourth round
- Auto Windscreens Shield: Southern Area final
- Top goalscorer: League: Boli (12); All: Boli (24)
- Average home league attendance: 4,062
Home colours

The 1997–98 season was the 99th completed season in the history of Walsall Football Club, the clubs 78th season in the Football League and third consecutive season in the Football League Second Division. In addition to the league, Walsall also participated in the FA Cup, League Cup and Football League Trophy.

== Season summary ==
The Saddlers finished in the top half of the Second Division in the previous two seasons under Chris Nicholl's management, however, he quit in May 1997 citing family reasons. After Nicholl's departure, Walsall turned to former Denmark international Jan Sørensen who became Walsall's first, and to date only, ever manager from continental Europe.

Sørensen attracted foreign talent to Walsall, bringing in former Ligue 1 top goalscorer Roger Boli and his compatriot Jean-François Péron,p.

Whilst Walsall finished a lowly 19th in the Second Division, the club reached the fourth round of the League Cup, fourth round of the FA Cup and the Southern Area Final of the Football League Trophy, being just ten minutes away from a first ever appearance at Wembley Stadium.

However, despite the club's cup exploits, a poor finish in the league signalled the end of Sørensen's time at Walsall after just one season.

== Final league table ==
Pos	Team	Pld	W	D	L	GF	GA	GD	Pts	Promotion or relegation
17	Luton Town	46	14	15	17	60	64	−4	57	
18	Millwall	46	14	13	19	43	54	−11	55	
19	Walsall	46	14	12	20	43	52	−9	54	
20	Burnley	46	13	13	20	55	65	−10	52	
21	Brentford (R)	46	11	17	18	50	71	−21	50	Relegation to the Third Division

Rules for classification: In the Football League goals scored (GF) takes precedence over goal difference (GD).
(R) Relegated

== Results ==
Walsall's score comes first

=== Legend ===
Win	Draw	Loss

=== Football League Second Division ===
Date	Opponent	Venue	Result	Attendance	Scorers
9 August 1997	Chesterfield	A	1–3	5,193	Platt
16 August 1997	Fulham	H	1–1	4,418	Mountfield
23 August 1997	Gillingham	A	1–2	5,083	Boli
30 August 1997	Southend United	H	3–1	3,304	Boli (3)
2 September 1997	Northampton Town	H	0–2	5,550	
9 September 1997	Bristol Rovers	A	0–2	6,225	
13 September 1997	Preston North End	A	0–0	9,092	
20 September 1997	York City	H	2–0	2,972	Boli, Hodge
27 September 1997	Plymouth Argyle	A	1–2	6,207	Boli
4 October 1997	Carlisle United	H	3–1	3,957	Boli (2), Watson
11 October 1997	Wrexham	H	3–0	4,042	Boli, Hodge (pen), Watson
18 October 1997	Brentford	A	0–3	4,874	
21 October 1997	Wycombe Wanderers	A	2–4	3,884	Viveash, Watson
25 October 1997	Bristol City	H	0–0	4,618	
1 November 1997	Burnley	A	1–2	9,293	Viveash
4 November 1997	Grimsby Town	H	0–0	2,599	
8 November 1997	Watford	H	0–0	5,077	
22 November 1997	Luton Town	A	1–0	4,726	Hodge
29 November 1997	Blackpool	H	2–1	3,933	Watson, Boli
3 December 1997	Millwall	A	1–0	4,647	Keates
13 December 1997	Bournemouth	H	2–1	3,548	Boli, Hodge
19 December 1997	Oldham Athletic	A	0–0	4,677	
26 December 1997	Bristol Rovers	H	0–1	6,634	
28 December 1997	Northampton Town	A	2–3	7,094	Porter, Hodge
10 January 1998	Chesterfield	H	3–2	4,042	Reeves (own goal), Watson (2)
17 January 1998	Southend United	A	1–0	3,310	Watson
31 January 1998	Preston North End	H	1–1	5,377	Hodge (pen)
7 February 1998	York City	A	0–1	2,959	
14 February 1998	Carlisle United	A	1–1	4,530	Hodge
21 February 1998	Plymouth Argyle	H	0–1	4,612	
24 February 1998	Brentford	H	0–0	3,166	
28 February 1998	Wrexham	A	1–2	3,622	Ricketts
3 March 1998	Watford	A	2–1	8,096	Tholot, Blake
7 March 1998	Burnley	H	0–0	5,212	
14 March 1998	Grimsby Town	A	0–3	4,916	
21 March 1998	Wigan Athletic	H	1–0	3,169	Péron
28 March 1998	Luton Town	H	2–3	3,922	Viveash, Tholot
31 March 1998	Gillingham	H	1–0	3,117	Evans
4 April 1998	Blackpool	A	0–1	4,451	
7 April 1998	Fulham	A	1–1	6,733	Boli
11 April 1998	Millwall	H	2–0	3,307	Tholot, Hodge (pen)
14 April 1998	Bournemouth	A	0–1	3,404	
18 April 1998	Oldham Athletic	H	0–0	3,562	
21 April 1998	Wigan Athletic	A	0–2	2,725	
25 April 1998	Bristol City	A	1–2	15,059	Tholot
2 May 1998	Wycombe Wanderers	H	0–1	4,412	

=== FA Cup ===
Round	Date	Opponent	Venue	Result	Attendance	Goalscorers
R1	15 November 1997	Lincoln United	H	2–0	3,279	Watson, Boli
R2	6 December 1997	Macclesfield Town	A	7–0	3,566	Boli (2, 1 pen), Hodge (2, 1 pen), Viveash, Porter (2)
R3	13 January 1998	Peterborough United	A	2–0	12,809	Watson (2)
R4	24 January 1998	Manchester United	A	1–5	54,669	Boli

=== League Cup ===
Round	Date	Opponent	Venue	Result	Attendance	Goalscorers
R1 1st Leg	12 August 1997	Exeter City	H	2–0	2,321	Platt, Boli
R1 2nd Leg	26 August 1997	Exeter City	A	1–0 (won 3–0 on agg)	2,467	Boli
R2 1st Leg	17 September 1997	Nottingham Forest	A	1–0	7,841	Skinner
R2 2nd Leg	24 September 1997	Nottingham Forest	H	2–2 (won 3–2 on agg)	6,037	Watson (2)
R3	14 October 1997	Sheffield United	H	2–1	8,239	Watson, Tiler (own goal)
R4	19 November 1997	West Ham United	A	1–4	17,463	Watson

=== Football League Trophy ===
Round	Date	Opponent	Venue	Result	Attendance	Goalscorers
SR1	9 December 1997	Barnet	A	2–1	754	Blake, Boli
SR2	6 January 1998	Brighton & Hove Albion	H	5–0	2,562	Watson, Boli (2), Keates, Allan (own goal)
SQF	28 January 1998	Bristol Rovers	A	1–0 (a.e.t.)	4,165	Boli
SSF	17 February 1998	Peterborough United	A	2–1	4,199	Boli, Ricketts
Southern F 1st Leg	10 March 1998	Bournemouth	H	0–2	6,017	
Southern F 2nd Leg	17 March 1998	Bournemouth	A	3–2 (lost 3–4 on agg)	8,972	Thomas, Boli, Tholot

== Squad ==
Note: Flags indicate national team as defined under FIFA eligibility rules; some limited exceptions apply. Players may hold more than one non-FIFA nationality.

No.	Pos.	Nation	Player
-	GK	ENG	Jimmy Walker
-	DF	WAL	Wayne Evans
-	DF	ENG	Adi Viveash
-	DF	ENG	Chris Marsh
-	DF	ENG	Derek Mountfield
-	MF	FRA	Jean-François Péron
-	MF	ENG	Dean Keates
-	MF	ENG	Gary Porter
-	FW	FRA	Roger Boli
-	FW	ENG	John Hodge
-	FW	ENG	Andy Watson
-	DF	ENG	Ian Roper
-	MF	ENG	Mark Blake
-	FW	FRA	Didier Tholot

No.	Pos.	Nation	Player
-	FW	ENG	Clive Platt
-	MF	ENG	John Keister
-	DF	ENG	Stuart Ryder
-	MF	FRA	Jean-Jacques Eydelie
-	FW	ENG	Michael Ricketts
-	MF	ENG	Louie Donowa (on loan from Birmingham City)
-	MF	ENG	Wayne Thomas
-	MF	ENG	Justin Skinner (on loan from Bristol Rovers)
-	FW	ENG	John Williams
-	DF	ENG	Matt Gadsby
-	FW	ENG	Darren Beckford
-	FW	NED	Gijsbert Bos (on loan from Rotherham United)
-	GK	ENG	Danny Naisbitt
-	DF	ENG	Darren Rogers
