= 1998–99 Dundee United F.C. season =

Dundee United
1998–99 season
- Chairman: Jim McLean
- Manager: Tommy McLean (until 5 September); Paul Sturrock (from 5 September)
- Stadium: Tannadice Park
- SPL: Ninth place
- Scottish Cup: Semi–finals
- League Cup: Third round
- Top goalscorer: League: Billy Dodds (16); All: Billy Dodds (17)
- Highest home attendance: 12,788 vs. Rangers, SPL, 12 September 1998
- Lowest home attendance: 4,700 vs. Stirling Albion, League Cup, 8 August 1998
Home colours	Away colours

The 1998–99 season was the 90th year of football played by Dundee United, and covered the period from 1 July 1998 to 30 June 1999. United finished in ninth place with 34 points in the inaugural season of the Scottish Premier League.

== Summary ==
The cup campaigns brought mixed fortunes: a third round League Cup exit to Ross County was bettered by a Scottish Cup semi-final loss to Celtic.

The club's playing kits were sponsored by Telewest for the third season in a row.

Joe Miller, who signed from Aberdeen, scored two goals during his time with United – both against Aberdeen.

United led eventual champions Celtic in three of the four league matches in 1998–99 but only managed to take one point.

United's highest and lowest home attendances occurred in consecutive matches at Tannadice – nearly 13,000 watched United in a goalless draw against Rangers while less than 6,500 turned up eleven days later to watch them play Dunfermline. It was the second season in a row that United's lowest home attendance was against the Pars.

Seventeen players were signed during the 1998–99 season, with a total (public) transfer cost of over £1.75m. One loan signing was also made during the season. Fourteen players left the club during and at the end of the 1998–99 season, with one player also going out on loan. The club received £900k in transfer fees, amounting to around half of the transfer expenditure.

== Fixtures and results ==
=== Scottish Premier League ===
1 August 1998 1	Kilmarnock	2–0	Dundee United	Rugby Park
	Wright 32'; Nevin 72'			Attendance: 8,208; Referee: M McCurry

16 August 1998 2	Dundee United	0–0	Heart of Midlothian	Tannadice Park
	Thompson (red card) 89'			Attendance: 9,629; Referee: S Dougal

22 August 1998 3	Celtic	2–1	Dundee United	Celtic Park
	Burley 80'; Burchill 83'		Winters 31'	Attendance: 59,738; Referee: A Freeland

30 August 1998 4	Motherwell	1–0	Dundee United	Fir Park
	Nyyssonen 43'			Attendance: 11,201; Referee: J McCluskey

12 September 1998 5	Dundee United	0–0	Rangers	Tannadice Park
				Attendance: 12,788; Referee: J Rowbotham

19 September 1998 6	Dundee	2–2	Dundee United	Dens Park
	Annand 69'; Adamczuk 89'		McSwegan 63'; Olofsson 67'	Attendance: 12,081; Referee: W Young

23 September 1998 7	Dundee United	1–1	Dunfermline Athletic	Tannadice Park
	McSwegan 27'		Squires 40'	Attendance: 6,449; Referee: J McCluskey

26 September 1998 8	St Johnstone	1–3	Dundee United	McDiarmid Park
	McCluskey (red card) 35'; Grant 84'		Dodds 16', 35' (pen.), 83'; Olofsson (red card) 85'	Attendance: 6,665; Referee: S Dougal

4 October 1998 9	Dundee United	1–0	Aberdeen	Tannadice Park
	McSwegan 23'			Attendance: 8,933; Referee: M McCurry

17 October 1998 10	Dundee United	0–2	Kilmarnock	Tannadice Park
			McGowne 12'; Vareille 80'	Attendance: 8,137; Referee: M McCurry

24 October 1998 11	Heart of Midlothian	0–1	Dundee United	Tynecastle Park
			Mathie 84'	Attendance: 13,124; Referee: G Simpson

31 October 1998 12	Rangers	2–1	Dundee United	Ibrox Stadium
	Wallace 63'; Amoruso 84'		Dodds 25'	Attendance: 49,503; Referee: G Simpson

7 November 1998 13	Dundee United	2–2	Motherwell	Tannadice Park
	Dodds 48'; Jonsson 60'		Coyle 4', 50'	Attendance: 6,616; Referee: M McCurry

15 November 1998 14	Dunfermline Athletic	2–1	Dundee United	East End Park
	Tod 26'; McCulloch 35'		Mathie 3'	Attendance: 10,704; Referee: J Rowbotham

22 November 1998 15	Dundee United	0–1	Dundee	Tannadice Park
			Grady 82'	Attendance: 11,230; Referee: H Dallas

28 November 1998 16	Aberdeen	0–3	Dundee United	Pittodrie Stadium
			Olofsson 17'; Miller 49'; Easton 56'	Attendance: 11,964; Referee: J Rowbotham

5 December 1998 17	Dundee United	1–1	St Johnstone	Tannadice Park
	Dodds 53'		Grant 55' (pen.)	Attendance: 7,293; Referee: G Simpson

12 December 1998 18	Dundee United	1–1	Celtic	Tannadice Park
	Zetterlund 49'		Larsson 85'	Attendance: 11,612; Referee: J McCluskey

20 December 1998 19	Kilmarnock	2–0	Dundee United	Rugby Park
	Wright 30'; Durrant 87' (pen.)			Attendance: 13,538; Referee: H Dallas

26 December 1998 20	Motherwell	2–0	Dundee United	Fir Park
	McMillan 55'; Brannan 57'			Attendance: 6,001; Referee: D McDonald

30 December 1998 21	Dundee United	1–2	Rangers	Tannadice Park
	Dodds 43'		Wilson 32'; Wallace 90'	Attendance: 11,707; Referee: M McCurry

2 January 1999 22	Dundee	1–3	Dundee United	Dens Park
	McSkimming 28'		Dodds 10'; Thompson 16'; Olofsson 70'	Attendance: 11,751; Referee: S Dougal

30 January 1999 23	Dundee United	1–1	Dunfermline Athletic	Tannadice Park
	Olofsson 33'		Smith 46'	Attendance: 7,646; Referee: H Dallas

6 February 1999 24	St Johnstone	1–0	Dundee United	McDiarmid Park
	Bollan 9' (pen.)			Attendance: 5,771; Referee: J McCluskey

20 February 1999 25	Dundee United	3–0	Aberdeen	Tannadice Park
	Olofsson 34'; Dodds 48'; Hannah 66'			Attendance: 8,309; Referee: J McCluskey

27 February 1999 26	Celtic	2–1	Dundee United	Celtic Park
	Burley 74'; Larsson 78'		Dodds 25'	Attendance: 59,902; Referee: M McCurry

20 March 1999 27	Rangers	0–1	Dundee United	Ibrox Stadium
			Olofsson 44'; Skoldmark (red card) 64'	Attendance: 49,164; Referee: M Clark

3 April 1999 28	Dundee United	0–3	Motherwell	Tannadice Park
			Brannan 3'; Spencer 38', 60'	Attendance: 8,110; Referee: M Clark

6 April 1999 29	Dundee United	1–3	Heart of Midlothian	Tannadice Park
	Dodds 7'		McSwegan 25', 45'; Cameron 60'	Attendance: 10,648; Referee: J McCluskey

17 April 1999 30	Aberdeen	0–4	Dundee United	Pittodrie Stadium
	Pepper (red card) 72'		Dodds 36', 56'; Miller 53'; Olofsson 54'	Attendance: 11,603; Referee: Dallas

20 April 1999 31	Dundee United	0–1	St Johnstone	Tannadice Park
	Dodds 53'		Griffin 42'; Lowndes (yellow card) 50' (red card)	Attendance: 6,741; Referee: M McCurry

24 April 1999 32	Dunfermline Athletic	2–2	Dundee United	East End Park
	Millar 46' (pen.); Smith 5'		Dodds 13', 18' (pen.)	Attendance: 10,704; Referee: J Rowbotham

1 May 1999 33	Dundee United	0–2	Dundee	Tannadice Park
	Patterson (yellow card) 76' (red card)		Irvine 67'; Grady 90'	Attendance: 12,280; Referee: H Dallas

8 May 1999 34	Dundee United	0–0	Kilmarnock	Tannadice Park
				Attendance: 7,190; Referee: J Rowbotham

15 May 1999 35	Heart of Midlothian	4–1	Dundee United	Tynecastle Park
	Ritchie 41'; McSwegan 50'; Adam 67'; Cameron 77'		Eustace 90'	Attendance: 13,187; Referee: D Smith

23 May 1999 36	Dundee United	1–2	Celtic	Tannadice Park
	Dodds 59' (pen.)		Burchill 34', Burchill 35'	Attendance: 10,062; Referee: S Dougal

=== Scottish Cup ===
2 February 1999 Third round	Queen's Park	0–0	Dundee United	Excelsior Stadium
19:45				Attendance: 1,953

9 February 1999 Third round replay	Dundee United	1–0	Queen's Park	Tannadice Park
	Dodds 38'			Attendance: 4,973; Referee: J Rowbotham

3 March 1999 Fourth round	Clydebank	2–2	Dundee United	Kilbowie Park
19:45	Nicholls 13'; Gardner 68'		Olofsson 51'; Patterson 79'	Attendance: 1,299; Referee: K Clark

6 March 1999 Fourth round replay	Dundee United	3–0	Clydebank	Tannadice Park
	Duffy 14'; Olofsson 62', 65'			Attendance: 5,570; Referee: K Clark

13 March 1999 Quarter-finals	Ayr United	0–0	Dundee United	Somerset Park
				Attendance: 5,508; Referee: S Dougal

16 March 1999 Quarter-final replay	Dundee United	2–1	Ayr United	Tannadice Park
	Murray 42'; Skoldmark 51'		Walker 46'	Attendance: 7,313; Referee: S Dougal

10 April 1999 Semi-finals	Celtic	2–0	Dundee United	Ibrox Stadium
	Blinker 30'; Viduka 39'			Attendance: 43,691; Referee: W Young

=== Scottish League Cup ===
8 August 1998 Second round	Dundee United	2–2 (a.e.t.) (5–4 p)	Stirling Albion	Tannadice Park
	McSwegan 24'; Boli 36'		Bone 27', 71'	Attendance: 4,700; Referee: J McCluskey

19 August 1998 Third round	Ross County	2–0 (a.e.t.)	Dundee United	Victoria Park
	Adams 104', 118'			Attendance: 3,206; Referee: G Simpson

== Player statistics ==
During the 1998–99 season, United used 35 different players comprising 11 nationalities, plus two unused substitutes. The table below shows the number of appearances and goals scored by each player.

No.	Pos	Nat	Player	Total		SPL		Scottish Cup		League Cup	
No.	Pos	Nat	Player	Apps	Goals	Apps	Goals	Apps	Goals	Apps	Goals
1	GK	(Netherlands) NED	Sieb Dijkstra	36	0	26+1	0	7	0	2	0
2	DF	(Northern Ireland) NIR	Iain Jenkins	7	0	5+1	0	0	0	1	0
3	DF	(Scotland) SCO	Maurice Malpas	37	0	31	0	4	0	2	0
4	DF	(Iceland) ISL	Sigurður Jónsson	18	1	12+2	1	4	0	0	0
5	DF	(Northern Ireland) NIR	Darren Patterson	28	1	19+5	0	3	1	1	0
6	DF	(Norway) NOR	Erik Pedersen	8	0	6	0	2	0	0	0
7	FW	(Sweden) SWE	Kjell Olofsson	43	10	32+2	7	6+1	3	1+1	0
8	MF	(Sweden) SWE	Lars Zetterlund	24	1	20+1	1	2	0	1	0
9	MF	(Scotland) SCO	David Hannah	13	1	13	1	0	0	0	0
9	FW	(France) FRA	Roger Boli	5	1	3	0	0	0	2	1
10	MF	(Scotland) SCO	Jamie Dolan	8	0	4+1	0	1	0	1+1	0
11	MF	(Scotland) SCO	Craig Easton	37	1	28+2	1	6	0	1	0
12	FW	(Scotland) SCO	Gary McSwegan	7	4	5	3	0	0	1+1	1
12	FW	(Scotland) SCO	Alex Mathie	28	2	13+9	2	4+2	0	0	0
13	GK	(Scotland) SCO	Alan Combe	10	0	10	0	0	0	0	0
14	FW	(Scotland) SCO	Robbie Winters	4	1	1+2	1	0	0	1	0
14	FW	(Scotland) SCO	Billy Dodds	37	17	29+1	16	7	1	0	0
15	MF	(Scotland) SCO	Joe Miller	33	2	14+10	2	6+1	0	2	0
16	DF	(Scotland) SCO	Mark McNally	6	0	4+1	0	0	0	1	0
17	MF	(Scotland) SCO	Andy McLaren	12	0	3+5	0	0+3	0	0+1	0
18	DF	(Scotland) SCO	Neil Duffy	20	1	12+3	0	5	1	0	0
19	FW	(Scotland) SCO	Steven Thompson	19	1	5+10	1	1+3	0	0	0
20	MF	(Sweden) SWE	Magnus Sköldmark	33	1	22+3	0	2+4	1	1+1	0
21	DF	(Canada) CAN	Jason de Vos	31	0	23+2	0	6	0	0	0
23	MF	(Belgium) BEL	Tonny Mols	16	0	11	0	3	0	2	0
25	MF	(Scotland) SCO	Neil Murray	6	1	2+2	0	2	1	0	0
26	MF	(England) ENG	John Eustace	13	1	8+3	1	2	0	0	0
30	MF	(Scotland) SCO	Jim Paterson	15	0	6+4	0	4+1	0	0	0
31	DF	(Republic of Ireland) IRL	David Worrell	5	0	3+2	0	0	0	0	0
34	DF	(Wales) WAL	David Partridge	1	0	0+1	0	0	0	0	0
35	DF	(France) FRA	Bernard Pascual	18	0	16	0	0	0	2	0
36	DF	(Scotland) SCO	Scott McCulloch	9	0	9	0	0	0	0	0
37	MF	(Scotland) SCO	Brian McLaughlin	1	0	1	0	0	0	0	0
45	MF	(Peru) PER	José Espinoza	1	0	0+1	0	0	0	0	0
52	FW	(Scotland) SCO	Stephen McConalogue	1	0	0+1	0	0	0	0	0

=== Goalscorers ===
United had 17 players score with the team scoring 47 goals in total. The top goalscorer was Billy Dodds, who finished the season with 17 goals.

Name	League	Cups	Total
Billy Dodds	16	1	17
Kjell Olofsson	7	3	10
Gary McSwegan	3	1	4
Alex Mathie	2	0	2
Joe Miller	2	0	2
Craig Easton	1	0	1
John Eustace	1	0	1
David Hannah	1	0	1
Siggi Jonsson	1	0	1
Steven Thompson	1	0	1
Robbie Winters	1	0	1
Lars Zetterlund	1	0	1
Roger Boli	0	1	1
Neil Duffy	0	1	1
Neil Murray	0	1	1
Darren Patterson	0	1	1
Magnus Sköldmark	0	1	1

=== Discipline ===
During the 1998–99 season, four United players were sent off and 23 players received at least one caution. In total, the team received four red cards and x yellows.

Name	Cautions	Dismissals
Darren Patterson	(yellow card) 7	(red card) 1
Magnus Sköldmark	(yellow card) 2	(red card) 1
Kjell Olofsson		(red card) 1
Steven Thompson		(red card) 1
Maurice Malpas	(yellow card) 6	
Lars Zetterlund	(yellow card) 6	
Billy Dodds	(yellow card) 4	
Siggi Jonsson	(yellow card) 4	
Jason de Vos	(yellow card) 4	
David Hannah	(yellow card) 3	
Jamie Dolan	(yellow card) 2	
Craig Easton	(yellow card) 2	
Andy McLaren	(yellow card) 2	
Erik Pedersen	(yellow card) 2	
Alan Combe	(yellow card) 1	
Sieb Dykstra	(yellow card) 1	
John Eustace	(yellow card) 1	
Iain Jenkins	(yellow card) 1	
Gary McSwegan	(yellow card) 1	
Joe Miller	(yellow card) 1	
Tonny Mols	(yellow card) 1	
Bernard Pascual	(yellow card) 1	
Jim Paterson	(yellow card) 1	
David Worrell	(yellow card) 1	

== Competitions ==
=== League table ===
Pos	Team	Pld	W	D	L	GF	GA	GD	Pts	Qualification or relegation
6	Heart of Midlothian	36	11	9	16	44	50	−6	42	
7	Motherwell	36	10	11	15	35	54	−19	41	
8	Aberdeen	36	10	7	19	43	71	−28	37	
9	Dundee United	36	8	10	18	37	48	−11	34	
10	Dunfermline Athletic (R)	36	4	16	16	28	59	−31	28	Relegation to the 1999–2000 Scottish First Division

Updated to match(es) played on end of season. Source: Soccerway and SPL official website
Rules for classification: 1) Points; 2) Goal difference; 3) Goals scored
(R) Relegated

== Transfers ==
=== In ===
Date	Player	From	Fee
12 June 1998	(Scotland) Alan Combe	(Scotland) St Mirren	Free
1 July 1998	(Scotland) Joe Miller	(Scotland) Aberdeen	Free
9 July 1998	(Scotland) Mark McNally	(England) Stoke City	Free
10 July 1998	(Northern Ireland) Darren Patterson	(England) Luton Town	Free
15 July 1998	(France) Roger Boli	(England) Walsall	£150,000
31 July 1998	(Belgium) Tonny Mols	(Belgium) Lokeren	Free
31 July 1998	(Peru) José Espinoza	(Peru) Universitario	Free
6 August 1998	(France) Bernard Pascual	(France) Le Havre	Free
23 September 1998	(Scotland) Billy Dodds	(Scotland) Aberdeen	Swap
12 October 1998	(Canada) Jason de Vos	(England) Darlington	£400,000
16 October 1998	(Scotland) Alex Mathie	(England) Ipswich Town	£600,000
5 February 1999	(Scotland) David Hannah	(Scotland) Celtic	£300,000
11 February 1999	(Scotland) Neil Murray	(Scotland) Rangers	Free
26 February 1999	(Scotland) Scott McCulloch	(Scotland) Dunfermline Athletic	£300,000
11 March 1999	(Wales) David Partridge	(England) West Ham	£40,000
29 March 1999	(Republic of Ireland) David Worrell	(England) Blackburn Rovers	£50,000
1 April 1999	(Scotland) Brian McLaughlin	(Scotland) Celtic	Free

=== Out ===
Date	Player	From	Fee
31 August 1998	(Peru) José Espinoza	(Peru) Sporting Cristal	Free
23 September 1998	(Scotland) Robbie Winters	(Scotland) Aberdeen	£700,000
10 October 1998	(Scotland) Gary McSwegan	(Scotland) Heart of Midlothian	Free
16 October 1998	(Scotland) David Sinclair	(Scotland) Falkirk	Free
22 October 1998	(France) Roger Boli	(England) Bournemouth	£100,000
5 November 1998	(Scotland) Paul Walker	(Scotland) St Mirren	Free
1 February 1998	(England) Julian Alsford	(England) Chester City	Free
26 February 1999	(Scotland) Jamie Dolan	(Scotland) Dunfermline Athletic	Swap
25 March 1999	(Scotland) Andy McLaren	(England) Reading	£100,000
2 June 1999	(Scotland) Neil Duffy	(Scotland) Ayr United	Free
11 June 1999	(Netherlands) Sieb Dijkstra	(England) Ipswich Town	Free
18 June 1999	(Sweden) Kjell Olofsson	(Sweden) Moss FK	Free
23 June 1999	(Scotland) Brian McLaughlin	(England) Wigan Athletic	Free
30 June 1999	(Scotland) Neil Murray	(Germany) Mainz	Free

=== Loans in ===
Date	Player	From	Duration
19 February 1999	(England) John Eustace	(England) Coventry City	End of season

=== Loans out ===
Date	Player	From	Duration
18 September 1998	(England) Julian Alsford	(England) Barnet	3 months
