= Tony Richards (footballer, born 1934) =

English footballer (1934–2010)

Personal information
- Full name: Anthony Willis Richards
- Date of birth: 6 March 1934
- Place of birth: Birmingham, England
- Date of death: 4 March 2010 (aged 75)
- Position: Forward

Youth career
- Birmingham City

Senior career*
Years	Team	Apps	(Gls)
1951–1954	Birmingham City	0	(0)
1954–1963	Walsall	335	(184)
1963–1966	Port Vale	63	(30)
1966–1969	Nuneaton Borough	71	(45)
- Dudley Town
Total		469+	(259+)
- * Club domestic league appearances and goals

Anthony Willis Richards (6 March 1934 – 4 March 2010) was an English footballer who played as a forward.

Associated with Birmingham City as a teenager, he joined Walsall in 1954. He became the club's top scorer for five successive seasons, firing the "Saddlers" to two successive promotions from the Fourth Division into the Second Division in 1959–60 and 1960–61. After 185 goals in 334 league games for the club, he was sold to Port Vale for £9,000 in March 1963. Twice becoming the club's top scorer, a series of injuries brought his career to a close, and he moved into Non-League football in May 1966 with Nuneaton Borough and Dudley Town.

== Career ==
Richards was in the Army from 1952 to his demobbing in 1954, playing football (as captain) for the Battery and Regimental team whilst serving in Egypt.

Richards started his career with Birmingham City but did not make a league appearance for the club before joining Walsall in 1954. Walsall finished 23rd in the 24 team Third Division South in 1954–55 under the stewardship of Frank Buckley, and were forced to apply for re-election. They rose to 20th in 1955–56 under John Love, and then 15th in 1956–57. Richards came to prominence after Bill Moore was appointed manager, and finished as the club's top scorer in 1957–58 with 20 goals, as a 20th-place finish meant that Walsall became founder members of the Fourth Division. He scored 28 goals in 1958–59, as his team posted a sixth-place finish, two places and six points behind promoted Shrewsbury Town. His 26 goals in 1959–60 helped to fire Walsall to the top of the table, a clear five points ahead of second place Notts County. He was the highest goal scorer in the Third Division in 1960–61 with 36 goals, as he fired the "Saddlers" to a second-successive promotion as runners-up, six points behind champions Bury. His 20 goals in 1961–62 helped to secure the club's place in the Second Division. However, they were relegated in 1962–63, as for the first time in six seasons, Richards was not the club's top goalscorer. In his nine years at Fellows Park, Richards scored 185 goals in 334 league games and became the club's second-highest goal scorer. In one memorable game against Bournemouth and Boscombe Athletic he scored a penalty and then saved a penalty after an injury to his goalkeeper.

He joined Freddie Steele's Port Vale for £9,000 in March 1963. Amazingly, with 13 goals in 14 games in the 1962–63 season, he had become the club's top scorer despite only playing for three months of the season. The following season, with nine months to play in, a leg injury Richards suffered in September meant he was only able to re-create his previous season's record; scoring 13 goals in 34 games, once more becoming the club's top scorer. He hit a hat-trick against Bristol City in a 4–1 win at Vale Park on 31 August 1963. However, he began to be plagued by injuries at Vale, missing the start of the 1964–65 relegation season after suffering the effects of an insect bite. In September 1964 he sustained a cartilage injury that required surgery. He scored five goals in 20 appearances in 1965–66. Still, he never really recovered after his operation and was given a free transfer by manager Jackie Mudie in May 1966. He finished his career with non-League clubs Nuneaton Borough and Dudley Town.

Before he died, Richards was appointed an Honorary Life President of Walsall to mark his contribution to the club and his cult status amongst the club's fans. Richards died on 4 March 2010, two days before what would have been his 76th birthday. A minute's silence was held before Walsall's 2–2 draw with Millwall on 7 March as a tribute to Richards and Macclesfield Town manager Keith Alexander, who had died on 3 March.

== Career statistics ==
Appearances and goals by club, season and competition
Club	Season	League			FA Cup		Other		Total	
Club	Season	Division	Apps	Goals	Apps	Goals	Apps	Goals	Apps	Goals
Birmingham City	1951–52	Second Division	0	0	0	0	—		0	0
Walsall	1954–55	Third Division South	32	22	3	4	—		35	26
Walsall	1955–56	Third Division South	35	15	4	2	—		39	17
Walsall	1956–57	Third Division South	36	17	0	0	—		36	17
Walsall	1957–58	Third Division South	41	20	1	0	—		42	20
Walsall	1958–59	Fourth Division	43	28	1	0	—		44	28
Walsall	1959–60	Fourth Division	46	24	2	2	—		48	26
Walsall	1960–61	Third Division	45	36	1	0	0	0	46	36
Walsall	1961–62	Second Division	36	15	4	4	2 (Note: Appearance(s) in Football League Cup)	1	42	20
Walsall	1962–63	Second Division	21	7	1	0	1	0	23	7
Walsall	Total		335	184	17	12	3	1	355	197
Port Vale	1962–63	Third Division	14	13	0	0	0	0	14	13
Port Vale	1963–64	Third Division	30	12	4	1	0	0	34	13
Port Vale	1964–65	Third Division	1	0	0	0	0	0	1	0
Port Vale	1965–66	Fourth Division	18	5	1	0	1	0	20	5
Port Vale	Total		63	30	5	1	1	0	69	31
Nuneaton Borough	1966–67	Southern League Premier Division	35	29	9	7	19 (Note: Five appearances and three goals in Southern League Cup, four appearances and four goals in Birmingham Senior Cup, ten appearances and eleven goals in Midland Floodlit Cup)	18	63	54
Nuneaton Borough	1967–68	Southern League Premier Division	31	14	2	0	17 (Note: Two appearances in Southern League Cup, twelve appearances and nine goals in Midland Floodlit Cup, two appearances in Camkin Cup)	9	50	23
Nuneaton Borough	1968–69	Southern League Premier Division	5	2	0	0	13 (Note: One appearance in Southern League Cup, two appearances and one goal in Birmingham Senior Cup, seven appearances and four goals in Midland Floodlit Cup, two appearances in East Anglian Cup, one appearance and one goal in Camkin Cup)	6	18	8
Nuneaton Borough	Total		71	45	11	7	49	33	131	85
Career total			469	259	33	20	53	34	555	313

== Honours ==
Walsall

- Football League Fourth Division: 1959–60
- Football League Third Division second-place promotion: 1960–61
