= Brian McLaughlin (footballer, born 1974) =

Scottish footballer

Personal information
- Date of birth: 14 May 1974 (age 52)
- Place of birth: Glasgow, Scotland
- Position: Winger

Senior career*
Years	Team	Apps	(Gls)
1992–1999	Celtic	75	(5)
1998	→ Airdrie (loan)	0	(0)
1999	Dundee United	1	(0)
1999–2001	Wigan Athletic	18	(0)
2001–2002	Ayr United	19	(1)
2002–2003	Queen of the South	32	(1)
2003–2004	St Johnstone	29	(3)
2004–2006	Queen of the South	45	(3)
2006–2007	Stenhousemuir	45	(1)
Total		264	(14)

International career
1994–1995	Scotland U21	8	(0)

Managerial career
- 2017–: Scotland U17
- * Club domestic league appearances and goals

Brian McLaughlin (born 14 May 1974 in Bellshill) is a Scottish former footballer, who most notably played for Celtic in the early 1990s, and was a Scottish under-21 international.

== Career ==
Educated in Coatbridge, McLaughlin began his professional career with Celtic. He impressed as a youngster and made his league debut in November 1993 under then manager Lou Macari. He stayed at Celtic for another six years, with the bulk of his appearances made under Macari's successor, Tommy Burns. McLaughlin won his only major winner's medal on 27 May 1995, when Celtic defeated Airdrie 1–0 in the Scottish Cup Final.

McLaughlin was linked with a move to Livingston in November 1998, but the midfielder turned the offer down.

After a brief loan period with Airdrie, he left Celtic to join Dundee United on a free transfer. He then had a two-year spell in England with Wigan Athletic, where he scored once in a Football League Trophy tie against Oldham Athletic. In 2001, he returned to Scotland and joined Ayr United, where he scored once against Falkirk. After one season, McLaughlin moved on to Queen of the South, where his only goal ironically came in a 1–0 win over Ayr. His next club was St Johnstone, joining them in 2003, only to return to Queen of the South again after only a year. He finally ended his career at Stenhousemuir, scoring once against Elgin City, before retiring in 2008.

McLaughlin later became a football coach. He was appointed head coach of the Scotland under-17 team in 2017.

== Honours ==
Celtic

- Scottish Cup: 1994–95

== See also ==
- Dundee United FC Season 1998-99
