= Clive Platt =

English footballer

Personal information
- Full name: Clive Linton Platt
- Date of birth: 27 October 1977 (age 49)
- Place of birth: Wolverhampton, England
- Height: 6 ft 4 in (1.93 m)
- Position: Striker

Senior career*
Years	Team	Apps	(Gls)
1995–1999	Walsall	32	(4)
1999	→ Rochdale (loan)	6	(3)
1999–2003	Rochdale	163	(27)
2003–2004	Notts County	19	(3)
2004–2005	Peterborough United	37	(6)
2005–2007	Milton Keynes Dons	102	(27)
2007–2010	Colchester United	125	(25)
2010–2012	Coventry City	67	(7)
2012–2014	Northampton Town	47	(6)
2014	Bury	19	(2)
Total		617	(110)
- * Club domestic league appearances and goals

Clive Linton Platt (born 27 October 1977) is an English former professional footballer. A forward, he made 617 appearances in the Football League, including 169 for Rochdale.

In his 19-year-long playing career, Platt also played for Walsall, Notts County, Peterborough United, Milton Keynes Dons, Colchester United, Coventry City, Northampton Town and Bury.

== Club career ==
=== Walsall ===
Platt was born in Wolverhampton and began his playing career with Walsall as an apprentice in 1995. A spell of just 32 games over four years saw him loaned to Rochdale in 1999.

=== Rochdale ===
The loan secured him a permanent move to Rochdale for a fee of £100,000 – then a club record. Platt made 169 league appearances and scored 30 goals for the club.

=== Notts County ===
In 2003, Platt signed a monthly deal with Notts County, where he scored just three times despite being a first-team regular. An indifferent year at Peterborough United followed, where Platt scored six times.

=== Milton Keynes Dons ===
Platt joined relegation-threatened Milton Keynes Dons in January 2005 and scored vital goals to help save the Dons from relegation under the guidance of Danny Wilson. However, the 2005–06 season was not much better for MK Dons, as they fought relegation again. Platt had a relatively fruitless campaign, but a good run of form towards the end of the season saw him finish second in the League One Player of the Month award for May and almost save the Dons from relegation.

The 2006–07 season saw MK Dons fighting for promotion from League Two. This turned out to be Platt's best season in terms of strike-rate, with him finding the net 18 times before suffering an injury that caused him to miss the first leg of a play-off tie against Shrewsbury Town and have an indifferent second leg.

=== Colchester United ===
In July 2007, Platt was sold to Championship side Colchester United for £300,000 – six times Colchester's previous transfer record. Before the transfer, Colchester had recently lost star goal-scorers Chris Iwelumo and Jamie Cureton to Charlton Athletic and Norwich City respectively.

In the 2007–08 season, Platt was paired up front with Kevin Lisbie and scored eight goals. In the 2008–09 season, however, he had many different strike partners, including Steven Gillespie, Mark Yeates, Scott Vernon and Jermaine Easter, and he notched 10 goals. In the 2009–10 season, he was once again paired up front with Kevin Lisbie, and he scored two goals on the opening day of the season.

=== Coventry City ===
Platt joined Coventry City on 29 July 2010 for a nominal fee, and signed a one-year contract with the club. He made his first league appearance in a 2–0 victory against Portsmouth on 7 August. He also scored against Leicester City, Bristol City and Ipswich Town. On 5 November 2011, Platt scored his 100th professional league goal, aged 34, against Southampton. The match ended in a 4–2 win for Southampton.

=== Northampton Town ===
On 25 May 2012, Platt signed for Northampton Town, where he rejoined former manager Aidy Boothroyd. He scored his first goal for the club in the league cup second round match against Wolverhampton Wanderers. On 9 Jan 2014, it was announced that his contract had been terminated by mutual consent. This came just three weeks after Boothroyd's dismissal as manager.

=== Bury ===
On 24 January 2014, he signed a contract with Bury until the end of the 2013–14 season. Shakers manager David Flitcroft had recruited Platt on the same day that he managed to bring in Rochdale's Andrew Tutte and Jean-Louis Akpa Akpro of Tranmere Rovers.

=== Retirement ===
Platt retired from football in October 2014 due to persistent injury problems.

== Career statistics ==
Appearances and goals by club, season and competition
Club	Season	League			FA Cup		League Cup		Other		Total	
Club	Season	Division	Apps	Goals	Apps	Goals	Apps	Goals	Apps	Goals	Apps	Goals
Walsall	1995–96	Second Division	4	2	0	0	0	0	0	0	4	2
Walsall	1996–97	Second Division	1	0	0	0	1	0	0	0	2	0
Walsall	1997–98	Second Division	20	1	1	0	2	1	4 (Note: Appearance(s) in Football League Trophy)	0	27	2
Walsall	1998–99	Second Division	7	1	0	0	0	0	3	0	10	1
Walsall	Total		32	4	1	0	3	1	7	0	43	5
Rochdale	1999–2000 (Note: Figures include six league appearances and three goals while on loan from Walsall.)	Third Division	41	9	3	1	0	0	4	0	48	10
Rochdale	2000–01	Third Division	43	8	1	1	2	1	1	0	47	10
Rochdale	2001–02 (Note: The 27 April 2002 match against Rushden & Diamonds, listed by Soccerbase as a regular-season league match, was in fact the first leg of the play-off semifinal.)	Third Division	43	7	3	0	2	0	2 (Note: One appearance in Football League Trophy, one in Third Division play-offs)	1	50	8
Rochdale	2002–03	Third Division	42	6	6	3	1	0	0	0	49	9
Rochdale	Total		169	30	13	5	5	1	7	1	194	37
Notts County	2003–04	Second Division	19	3	3	3	3	0	0	0	25	6
Peterborough United	2003–04	Second Division	18	2	—		—		—		18	2
Peterborough United	2004–05	League One	19	4	1	0	1	0	0	0	21	4
Peterborough United	Total		37	6	1	0	1	0	0	0	39	6
Milton Keynes Dons	2004–05	League One	20	3	—		—		—		20	3
Milton Keynes Dons	2005–06	League One	40	6	4	2	1	0	0	0	45	8
Milton Keynes Dons	2006–07	League Two	42	18	3	0	2	0	1 (Note: Appearance in League Two play-offs)	0	48	18
Milton Keynes Dons	Total		102	27	7	2	3	0	1	0	113	29
Colchester United	2007–08	Championship	41	8	0	0	1	0	—		42	8
Colchester United	2008–09	League One	43	10	1	0	2	0	2	0	48	10
Colchester United	2009–10	League One	41	7	2	1	1	0	1	1	45	9
Colchester United	Total		125	25	3	1	4	0	3	1	135	27
Coventry City	2010–11	Championship	34	3	2	0	1	0	—		37	3
Coventry City	2011–12	Championship	33	4	0	0	0	0	—		33	4
Coventry City	Total		67	7	2	0	1	0	0	0	70	7
Northampton Town	2012–13	League Two	36	5	2	1	2	1	2 (Note: One appearance in Football League Trophy, one in League Two play-offs)	0	42	7
Northampton Town	2013–14	League Two	11	1	1	0	0	0	0	0	12	1
Northampton Town	Total		47	6	3	1	2	1	2	0	54	8
Bury	2013–14	League Two	17	2	—		—		—		17	2
Bury	2014–15	League Two	2	0	—		0	0	0	0	2	0
Bury	Total		19	2	—		0	0	0	0	19	2
Career total			617	110	33	12	22	3	20	2	692	125

== Honours ==
- Milton Keynes Dons Player of the Year: 2006–07
