= 1993–94 Blackpool F.C. season =

English football club season

Blackpool F.C.
1993–94 season
- Owner and chairman: Owen Oyston
- Manager: Billy Ayre
- Division Two: 20th
- FA Cup: First round
- League Cup: Third round
- Top goalscorer: Andy Watson (20)

The 1993–94 season was Blackpool F.C.'s 86th season (83rd consecutive) in the Football League. They competed in the 24-team Division Two, then the third tier of English league football, finishing twentieth, avoiding relegation by one point after a final-day 4–1 victory over Leyton Orient at Bloomfield Road. It was Billy Ayre's third full season as manager. He was sacked in the summer.

Andy Watson was the club's top league scorer, with twenty goals. Watson's total remained a record for 27 years, until Jerry Yates went one better in the 2020–21 campaign.

On 22 January 1994, Blackpool ended a run of seven consecutive defeats with a 1–1 draw against Swansea City at Bloomfield Road. Andy Gouck put the Seasiders ahead after seven minutes. The free admission attracted 7,080 spectators to the match, and the experiment was a deemed a success. "The crowd was twice as big as we would have expected otherwise," said Billy Ayre. "It gave us all a lift."

== Table ==
Pos	Team	Pld	W	D	L	GF	GA	GD	Pts	Promotion or relegation
18	Leyton Orient	46	14	14	18	57	71	−14	56	
19	Cardiff City	46	13	15	18	66	79	−13	54	
20	Blackpool	46	16	5	25	63	75	−12	53	
21	Fulham (R)	46	14	10	22	50	63	−13	52	Relegation to the Third Division
22	Exeter City (R)	46	11	12	23	52	83	−31	45	Relegation to the Third Division

(R) Relegated
