= Tonny Mols =

Belgian footballer

Personal information
- Full name: Antonio Mols
- Date of birth: 8 January 1969 (age 57)
- Place of birth: Eeklo, Belgium
- Height: 1.80 m (5 ft 11 in)
- Position: Midfielder

Youth career
- 1988–1989: Eeklo

Senior career*
Years	Team	Apps	(Gls)
1989–1992	Club Brugge	4	(0)
1992–1993	RWDM		
1993–1998	Lokeren	120	(5)
1998–1999	Dundee United	11	(0)
1999	Arbroath	3	(0)
1999	Clyde	1	(0)
1999	Ross County	1	
1999–2000	Geel		
- Standaard Wetteren
2004–2005	Maldegem		
- * Club domestic league appearances and goals

Tonny Mols (born 8 January 1969 in Eeklo, Belgium) is a Belgian footballer who played for numerous clubs in Belgium and Scotland. In Scotland, he played with Dundee United for a season, and had trials with Arbroath, Clyde, and Ross County before returning to Belgium. He retired in 2005.

== Honours ==
- Belgian Cup Runner-up: 1

2004–05

== See also ==
- Dundee United F.C. season 1998–99
