= Jorge Leitão =

Portuguese football manager and former player

Personal information
- Full name: Jorge Manuel Vasconcelos Leitão
- Date of birth: 14 January 1974 (age 52)
- Place of birth: Nespereira, Portugal
- Height: 1.80 m (5 ft 11 in)
- Position: Striker

Youth career
- 1991–1992: Coimbrões

Senior career*
Years	Team	Apps	(Gls)
1992–1997	Coimbrões		
1997–1998	Avintes		
1998–2000	Feirense	67	(21)
2000–2005	Walsall	233	(57)
2006–2007	Beira-Mar	27	(8)
2007–2009	Feirense	69	(11)
2009–2012	Arouca	83	(10)
Total		479+	(107+)

Managerial career
- 2012–2018: Arouca (assistant)
- 2017: Arouca
- * Club domestic league appearances and goals

Jorge Manuel Vasconcelos Leitão (born 14 January 1974) is a Portuguese former professional footballer who played as a striker.

He was best known for his six-year spell with Walsall in England, but also scored 28 goals in 169 games in the Portuguese Segunda Liga over seven seasons.

== Club career ==
=== Early years and Walsall ===
Born in Nespereira, Cinfães, Viseu District, Leitão started playing in amateur football. Aged 24, he signed with Feirense, being relegated from the Segunda Liga in his first season and scoring 14 goals in the second. In July 2000, he moved to England with Walsall, who paid £150,000 for his services following an impressive trial spell.

Leitão scored a career-best 18 goals in 44 matches in his debut campaign. The Saddlers promoted to the Championship after disposing of Reading in the play-off final.

In 2001–02, after a difficult start, Leitão's fate was transformed following the sacking of Ray Graydon. In the first game under new manager Colin Lee, he netted twice at Premier League's Charlton Athletic in the fourth round of the FA Cup. The team also managed to finally stay clear of the relegation zone, and he scored the goal that saved them from the drop, the only one in an away win over Sheffield United on 13 April 2002; two weeks later, he extended his contract for a further two years.

2002–03 was Walsall's most successful season in the league since the 1950s, with Leitão pairing with Brazilian José Junior for a Portuguese-speaking front line which scored 30 goals. Highlights included a brace against Stoke City (4–2 home win), one against Grimsby Town (3–1, home) and the game's only against Brighton & Hove Albion (also at home); however, after the loss of Júnior to Derby County in the summer – his replacement being former Arsenal and England star Paul Merson – the team suffered relegation, with Leitão netting seven times from 39 appearances, his worst during his tenure.

In late December 2005, Leitão signed a pre-contract with Beira-Mar in his country, citing homesickness as a factor in his sudden departure from English football. Though the deal did not come into effect until June 2006, both Merson (now the team's manager) and chairman Jeff Bonser offered to release the player earlier, in recognition of the dedication he had given to the club in his five and a half years of service. The penultimate of his 262 competitive matches for Walsall (71 goals) was a 3–0 defeat away to Bristol City, in which he also suffered a groin injury; in his last, at Bescot Stadium against Blackpool, he was treated to a near half-hour rendition of his name by the home fans, eventually being reduced to tears before leaving the field through a guard of honour composed of some of his teammates.

=== Later career ===
After helping Beira-Mar promote to the Primeira Liga in 2006, Leitão had his only experience in the competition, scoring twice in ten appearances as the Aveiro side were immediately relegated. He subsequently spent two and a half seasons with Feirense in the second tier and, at the age of 35, moved to modest Arouca.

Immediately after retiring, Leitão was named his last club's assistant coach. On 21 March 2017 he became the third first-team manager of the season after Lito Vidigal and Manuel Machado. He was not able to prevent top-division relegation, after winning only once in his five games in charge.

== Honours ==
Walsall

- Football League Second Division play-offs: 2001

Beira-Mar

- Segunda Liga: 2005–06

Arouca

- Segunda Divisão: 2009–10
