= Colin Taylor (footballer, born 1940) =

English footballer (1940–2005)

Personal information
- Date of birth: 24 August 1940
- Place of birth: Stourbridge, Worcestershire, England
- Date of death: June 2005 (aged 64)
- Position: Left winger

Youth career
- ?–1958: Stourbridge

Senior career*
Years	Team	Apps	(Gls)
1958–1963	Walsall	213	(93)
1963–1964	Newcastle United	33	(7)
1964–1968	Walsall	148	(52)
1968–1969	Crystal Palace	34	(8)
1969–1973	Walsall	96	(24)
1973–?	Kidderminster Harriers		
- * Club domestic league appearances and goals

Colin Taylor (24 August 1940 — June 2005) was an English professional footballer who played as a left winger for Walsall F.C. in three different spells, with whom he made at least 459 league appearances by the end of the 1972–73 season, scoring at least 169 goals. He also made 33 appearances in league games for Newcastle (7 goals) in season 1963–64 and 34 appearances in league games for Crystal Palace (8 goals), in season 1968–69, in which he helped Palace achieve promotion to the top flight for the first time. His haul of 32 goals for Walsall in season 1959–60 remains a record from the left wing.

Taylor was a flame-haired, barrel-chested left-winger who was a member of Walsall's first team during their golden days of the 1950s and 1960s. Taylor was given the nickname "Cannonball Colin" by Walsall supporters because of his accurate left foot and strong shooting abilities. Such was the power in his left boot, Walsall fans of his era would claim that "his left leg was out of proportion to his right". Supporters would also eulogise that, when he shot at the "Railway End" goal at Fellow's Park, and happened to miss, the speed of the ball would be such, as to knock the rust off an old tea-sales caravan, permanently parked at that end.

On his retirement from professional football, Taylor, a quiet, modest man, worked as a painter and decorator.

Following his death in 2005, Walsall F.C. promised to build a permanent memorial for Taylor.

== Honours ==
Walsall

- Football League Fourth Division: 1959–60
