= Teddy Groves =

English footballer

Personal information
- Full name: Edwin Groves
- Date of birth: 1900
- Place of birth: Walsall, England
- Height: 5 ft 10 in (1.78 m)
- Position: Utility player

Senior career*
Years	Team	Apps	(Gls)
- Talbot Stead Tube Works
1921–1929	Walsall	249	(25)
- Shrewsbury Town
- Wellington Town
- * Club domestic league appearances and goals

Edwin Groves (1900 – after 1929) was an English footballer who played in The Football League for Walsall. Born in Walsall, he also played for Talbot Stead Tube Works, Shrewsbury Town and Wellington Town.
