= Roger Boli =

French footballer (born 1965)

Personal information
- Full name: Roger Zokou Boli
- Date of birth: 26 September 1965 (age 61)
- Place of birth: Adjamé, Ivory Coast
- Height: 1.74 m (5 ft 9 in)
- Position: Forward

Senior career*
Years	Team	Apps	(Gls)
1984–1988	Auxerre	55	(5)
1988–1989	Lille	25	(5)
1989–1996	Lens	229	(67)
1996–1997	Le Havre	26	(4)
1997–1998	Walsall	41	(12)
1998	Dundee United	3	(0)
1998–1999	AFC Bournemouth	6	(0)

International career
	France U21	1	(0)
- * Club domestic league appearances and goals

Roger Zokou Boli (born 26 September 1965) is a former professional footballer who played as a forward for clubs in the French and British leagues. Born in Ivory Coast, he represented France at youth level. He is currently a sports agent.

== Career ==
Roger Boli started his career with Auxerre, where he spent four seasons. A season at Lille followed, before a long spell with Lens. During his seven seasons with the club, Boli won promotion to Ligue 1, and finished joint-top scorer in the 1993–94 season. A season was spent with Le Havre, before moving to England with Walsall in 1997. Boli's twelve league goals with the Saddlers drew attention from Scottish side Dundee United and Boli moved north in a £150,000 deal in 1998. Injuries restricted him to just three league appearances, although he did score once in the Scottish League Cup against Stirling Albion, and within three months a £100,000 move saw him head to AFC Bournemouth. Boli's seven appearances would be his last before retiring in the summer of 1999.

In May 2001, Boli arranged a benefit match – Le Jubilé de Roger Boli – which saw past and present Lens players play against a team of French superstars (Zinedine Zidane, Marcel Desailly, Patrick Vieira, Eric Cantona, Jean-Pierre Papin, etc.). Lens won 7–2, with the match proceeds going to the Raoul-Follereau association.

== Personal life ==
Boli holds Ivorian and French nationalities.

He is the brother of the French former footballer Basile Boli, and uncle of the Ivorian footballer Yannick Boli. His sons, Charles, Yohan, and Kevin are also professional footballers.

== Career statistics ==
Appearances and goals by club, season and competition
Club	Season	League			National cup		League cup		Other		Total	
Club	Season	Division	Apps	Goals	Apps	Goals	Apps	Goals	Apps	Goals	Apps	Goals
Auxerre	1984–85	Division 1	10	1	0	0	—		—		10	1
Auxerre	1985–86	Division 1	17	3	1	0	—		2 (Note: Appearance(s) in UEFA Cup)	0	20	3
Auxerre	1986–87	Division 1	12	1	3	3	—		—		15	4
Auxerre	1987–88	Division 1	16	0	2	0	—		1	0	19	0
Auxerre	Total		55	4	6	3	—		3	0	64	7
Lille	1988–89	Division 1	25	5	3	1	—		—		28	6
Lens	1989–90	Division 2B	33	16	1	0	—		—		34	16
Lens	1990–91	Division 2B	31	11	1	0	—		5 (Note: Appearance(s) in Division 2 promotion play-offs)	4	37	15
Lens	1991–92	Division 1	33	4	2	0	—		—		35	4
Lens	1992–93	Division 1	31	3	2	0	—		—		33	3
Lens	1993–94	Division 1	35	20	4	2	—		—		39	22
Lens	1994–95	Division 1	38	9	2	0	2	0	—		42	9
Lens	1995–96	Division 1	28	4	1	0	1	0	4	2	34	6
Lens	Total		229	67	13	2	3	0	9	6	254	75
Le Havre	1996–97	Division 1	26	4	1	0	1	0	—		28	4
Walsall	1997–98	Division Two	41	12	4	4	6	2	6 (Note: Appearance(s) in the Football League Trophy)	6	57	24
Dundee United	1998–99	Premier League	3	0	—		2	1	—		5	1
AFC Bournemouth	1998–99	Division Two	6	0	2	0	1	0	1	0	10	0
Career total			385	92	26	10	13	3	19	12	443	117

== Honours ==
Individual

- Ligue 1 Golden Boot: 1993–94
- PFA Team of the Year: 1997–98 Second Division

== See also ==
- Top goalscorers in Ligue 1
- 1997–98 Walsall season
- 1998–99 Dundee United season
- 1998–99 AFC Bournemouth season
