= Don Penn =

English footballer

Personal information
- Full name: Donald John Penn
- Date of birth: 15 March 1960 (age 66)
- Place of birth: Smethwick, England
- Position: Striker

Senior career*
Years	Team	Apps	(Gls)
- Newton Albion
- Warley Borough
1977–1983	Walsall	141	(54)
- Nuneaton Borough
- Harrisons
- * Club domestic league appearances and goals

Donald John Penn (born 15 March 1960) is an English former professional footballer who played as a striker, making nearly 150 career appearances.

== Career ==
Born in Smethwick, Penn played for Newton Albion, Warley Borough, Walsall, Nuneaton Borough, and Harrisons.
