= Bernard Pascual =

French footballer (born 1967)

Personal information
- Full name: Bernard Pascual
- Date of birth: 10 April 1967 (age 59)
- Place of birth: Aubervilliers, France
- Position: Defender

Team information
- Current team: Le Havre AC (Assistant manager)

Senior career*
Years	Team	Apps	(Gls)
1990–1993	AS Beauvais		
1993–1998	Le Havre AC	115	(0)
1998–2000	Dundee United	48	(0)
- * Club domestic league appearances and goals

Bernard Pascual (born 10 April 1967) is a retired French footballer. He played as a defender. He is currently an assistant manager with Le Havre AC.

== Career ==
Pascual began his career with AS Beauvais, before joining Le Havre AC in 1993. After five seasons with Le HAC, Pascual moved to Scottish side Dundee United, spending two years at Tannadice. Following his release in 2000, Pascual played in the 2001 Thailand beach soccer tournament with France, scoring alongside Eric Cantona's hat-trick.
