= Charlie Ntamark =

Cameroonian footballer

Personal information
- Date of birth: 22 July 1964 (age 62)
- Place of birth: Paddington, England
- Position: Midfielder

Senior career*
Years	Team	Apps	(Gls)
- Canon Yaoundé
- Boreham Wood
1990–1997	Walsall	276	(12)
- Hednesford Town

International career
	Cameroon	31	(?)
Medal record
Men's football
Representing Cameroon
Africa Cup of Nations
Winner	1988 Morocco
- * Club domestic league appearances and goals

Charlie Ntamark (born 22 July 1964) is a Cameeroonian former footballer who played at both professional and international levels as a midfielder.

== Career ==
Ntamark played in Cameroon for Canon Yaoundé, and in England for Boreham Wood, Walsall and Hednesford Town.

He also represented Cameroon at international level, earning 31 caps and appearing on Cameroon's championship team at the 1988 African Cup of Nations.

== Later life ==
After retiring from professional football, Ntamark studied law at the University of Birmingham.

== Personal life ==
His son Charlie Anagho-Ntamark is also a footballer, active in English non-league and in Canada after being released from Aston Villa's academy aged 16.

== Honours ==
Cameroon

- African Cup of Nations: 1988
