= Stuart McCluskey =

Scottish footballer

Personal information
- Full name: Stuart Campbell McCluskey
- Date of birth: 29 October 1977 (age 49)
- Place of birth: Bellshill, Scotland
- Position: Defender

Youth career
- St Johnstone

Senior career*
Years	Team	Apps	(Gls)
1994–2003	St Johnstone	102	(3)
2003–2004	Falkirk	1	(0)
2004	Clyde	17	(1)
2004–2005	Greenock Morton	22	(1)
2005	Airdrie United	1	(0)
2005–2006	Dundee	14	(0)
2007–20??	Richmond SC		

International career
- Scotland U19
1996–1998	Scotland U21	14	(1)
- * Club domestic league appearances and goals

Stuart Campbell McCluskey (born 29 October 1977) is a Scottish former professional footballer. He represented his country, occasionally as captain, at under-19 and under-21 levels.

== Career ==
McCluskey began his career at St Johnstone, with whom he progressed through the youth ranks alongside Danny Griffin and under Paul Sturrock. The defender spent a decade at McDiarmid Park, notching up over a century of league appearances along the way.

In 2004, he joined Clyde, then under the guidance of McCluskey's former teammate in Perth, Alan Kernaghan, until the end of the season.

For the 2004–05 season he joined Greenock Morton, with whom he played one season, before moving back to Tayside to sign with St Johnstone's rivals Dundee, again linking up with Kernaghan, who was the new boss at Dens Park.

In April 2006, McCluskey was one of several players released by Dundee. He was reported to be looking to try his hand in Australia, and in May 2007 joined Melbourne-based Richmond SC, becoming club captain. During the 2008 season he also took up coaching and along with Tony Gignalito coached the Under 16 Richmond junior boys team.
