= Moses Lane =

English footballer

Personal information
- Full name: Moses Alexander Edmund Lane
- Date of birth: 17 February 1895
- Place of birth: Willenhall, England
- Date of death: 14 July 1949 (aged 54)
- Place of death: Cannock, England
- Height: 5 ft 6 1/2 in (1.69 m)
- Positions: Centre forward; inside forward

Senior career*
Years	Team	Apps	(Gls)
19??–1920	Willenhall		
1920–1921	Walsall		
1921–1922	Willenhall		
1922–1924	Birmingham	15	(4)
1924–1925	Derby County	0	(0)
1925–1926	Wellington Town		
1926–1927	Worcester City		(29)
1927–1929	Walsall	57	(51)
1929–19??	Brierley Hill Alliance		
–	Netherton		
19??–1933	Dudley Town		
- * Club domestic league appearances and goals

Moses Alexander Edmund Lane MM (17 February 1895 – 14 July 1949) was an English professional footballer who scored 55 goals from 72 appearances in the Football League playing for Birmingham and Walsall.

Lane was born in Willenhall, Staffordshire. During the First World War he served in France and Italy and was awarded the Military Medal. He began his football career in junior football in the Black Country area before joining Birmingham in April 1922. He made his debut in the First Division on 28 April 1923, in the penultimate game of the 1922–23 season, playing at inside left in a 1–0 win at home to Burnley. He kept his place for the last game of the season, and for the first six games of the next, but the arrival of Ernie Islip and the form and fitness of Johnny Crosbie and Joe Bradford restricted his first-team opportunities. He spent the 1924–25 season with Derby County. He was unable to break into the league side, but did play one match for the Rams in the F.A. Cup. In 1925 he returned to non-league football with successively Wellington Town and Worcester City.

His performances for Worcester, for whom he scored 34 goals in all competitions in the 1926–27 season, earned him a return to the Football League with Walsall of the Third Division South. Lane repaid them with 36 goals in all competitions in his first season, One more season at Walsall brought his goals tally up to 51 league goals from 57 appearances, and he finished off his career back in non-league with Brierley Hill Alliance, Netherton and Dudley Town.

Lane died in Cannock, Staffordshire, in 1949 at the age of 54.
