= John Hodge (English footballer) =

English footballer

Personal information
- Date of birth: 1 April 1969 (age 57)
- Place of birth: Ormskirk, England
- Position: Winger

Senior career*
Years	Team	Apps	(Gls)
1990–1991	Falmouth Town	3	(4)
1991–1993	Exeter City	65	(13)
1993–1996	Swansea City	102	(10)
1996–1998	Walsall	76	(13)
1998–2000	Gillingham	52	(1)
2000	→ Northampton Town (loan)	1	(0)
2000–2003	Northampton Town	59	(2)
2003	Kidderminster Harriers	0	(0)
- * Club domestic league appearances and goals

John Hodge (born 1 April 1969) is an English former professional footballer who played as a right winger.

He went on trial with Manchester United from November 1989 to December 1989. While at Swansea, he was a part of the team that won after a penalty shoot-out in the 1994 Football League Trophy Final. He joined Gillingham in July 1998.

His only league goal was a second-half injury-time equaliser against Macclesfield on 3 October 1998. He was regarded as a "supersub", often coming off the bench to great effect, including setting up Robert Taylor for a last-minute goal against Fulham on 28 November 1998, and Andy Thomson for a 100th-minute winner against Walsall in a FA Cup replay on 8 January 2000.

He was the only Gillingham player to successfully convert a penalty in their 3–1 penalty shoot-out defeat to Manchester City in the 1998–99 Division Two play-off final. Hodge was signed by Kidderminster Harriers in January 2003.

== Honours ==
Swansea City

- Football League Trophy: 1993–94

Individual

- PFA Team of the Year: 1997–98 Second Division
