= Andy Watson (footballer, born 1967) =

English footballer

Personal information
- Full name: Andrew Anthony Watson
- Date of birth: 1 April 1967 (age 59)
- Place of birth: Leeds, England
- Height: 5 ft 9 in (1.75 m)
- Position: Striker

Youth career
- Yorkshire Amateur

Senior career*
Years	Team	Apps	(Gls)
1987–1988	Harrogate Town		
1988–1990	Halifax Town	83	(15)
1990–1991	Swansea City	14	(1)
1991–1993	Carlisle United	56	(22)
1993–1996	Blackpool	115	(43)
1996–1999	Walsall	84	(15)
- Garforth Town
- Doncaster Rovers
Total		352	(96)
- * Club domestic league appearances and goals

Andrew Anthony Watson (born 1 April 1967) is an English former professional footballer. He played as a striker in a career spanning twelve years, and made over 300 league appearances.

After coming through the youth system at Yorkshire Amateur, Watson began his career in his native Yorkshire with Harrogate Town in 1987. After just a year he was signed by Halifax Town, then under the guidance of Billy Ayre.

After two years at the Shay, Watson joined Swansea City in 1990 for £40,000. With only a handful of games for the Swans to his name, he moved north the following year to Carlisle United. It was with the Cumbrians that he established his best goals average, scoring 22 times in 56 league appearances.

In 1993, Watson was signed for £55,000 by Blackpool, where he was reunited with Billy Ayre. He was purchased with funds raised via the club's "Buy A Player" match, a scheme by which money from gate receipts was given to the manager for spending in the transfer market. (The match in question was Blackpool v. Rotherham United on 16 January 1993, which drew a crowd of 6,144.)

Watson scored his first goals for Blackpool in a 3–3 draw with Preston North End in the West Lancashire derby. His haul of 20 League goals in the 1993–94 season remained a record for 27 years, until Jerry Yates equalled it in the 2020–21 campaign.

In six years at Bloomfield Road, Watson formed a successful partnership with Tony Ellis and scored 43 goals in League 115 appearances.

Gary Megson, who succeeded Sam Allardyce as Blackpool manager in 1996, decided Watson was surplus to requirements and sold him to Walsall for £60,000. He brought his career to a close at Doncaster Rovers.
