= 1962–63 Walsall F.C. season =

Walsall
1962–63 season
- Manager: Bill Moore
- Stadium: Fellows Park
- Second Division: 21st (31 Points)
- FA Cup: Third Round
- League Cup: Second Round
Home colours

During the 1962–63 season Walsall competed in the Football League Second Division where they finished in 21st position level on points with Charlton Athletic but had an inferior goal average and were relegated to the third tier.

== Final league table ==
=== Second Division ===
Pos	Team	Pld	W	D	L	GF	GA	GAv	Pts	Qualification or relegation
18	Derby County	42	12	12	18	61	72	0.847	36	
19	Grimsby Town	42	11	13	18	55	66	0.833	35	
20	Charlton Athletic	42	13	5	24	62	94	0.660	31	
21	Walsall (R)	42	11	9	22	53	89	0.596	31	Relegation to the Third Division
22	Luton Town (R)	42	11	7	24	61	84	0.726	29	Relegation to the Third Division

Rules for classification: 1) Points; 2) Goal average; 3) Goals scored
(R) Relegated

== Results ==
=== Legend ===
Win	Draw	Loss

=== Football League Second Division ===
18 August 1962 1	Portsmouth	4–1	Walsall	Fratton Park

21 August 1962 2	Walsall	1–1	Huddersfield Town	Fellows Park

25 August 1962 3	Walsall	4–1	Preston North End	Fellows Park

29 August 1962 4	Huddersfield Town	4–0	Walsall	Leeds Road

1 September 1962 5	Plymouth Argyle	3–0	Walsall	Home Park

4 September 1962 6	Walsall	1–0	Middlesbrough	Fellows Park

8 September 1962 7	Walsall	4–1	Grimsby Town	Fellows Park

12 September 1962 8	Middlesbrough	2–3	Walsall	Ayresome Park

15 September 1962 9	Norwich City	2–1	Walsall	Carrow Road

22 September 1962 10	Walsall	1–0	Rotherham United	Fellows Park

29 September 1962 11	Walsall	0–6	Newcastle United	Fellows Park

6 October 1962 12	Charlton Athletic	3–2	Walsall	The Valley

13 October 1962 13	Walsall	0–0	Stoke City	Fellows Park

20 October 1962 14	Sunderland	5–0	Walsall	Roker Park

27 October 1962 15	Walsall	1–1	Leeds United	Fellows Park

3 November 1962 16	Swansea Town	3–0	Walsall	Vetch Field

10 November 1962 17	Walsall	1–5	Chelsea	Fellows Park

17 November 1962 18	Luton Town	4–3	Walsall	Kenilworth Road

24 November 1962 19	Walsall	1–1	Southampton	Fellows Park

30 November 1962 20	Scunthorpe United	2–0	Walsall	Old Showground

8 December 1962 21	Walsall	3–1	Bury	Fellows Park

15 December 1962 22	Walsall	3–5	Portsmouth	Fellows Park

2 March 1963 23	Stoke City	3–0	Walsall	Victoria Ground
	Mudie

9 March 1963 24	Walsall	2–3	Sunderland	Fellows Park

13 March 1963 25	Leeds United	3–0	Walsall	Elland Road

16 March 1963 26	Walsall	1–3	Derby County	Fellows Park

19 March 1963 27	Preston North End	4–2	Walsall	Deepdale

23 March 1963 28	Walsall	0–1	Swansea Town	Fellows Park

26 March 1963 29	Walsall	2–2	Plymouth Argyle	Fellows Park

30 March 1963 30	Chelsea	0–1	Walsall	Stamford Bridge

6 April 1963 31	Walsall	1–1	Luton Town	Fellows Park

13 April 1963 32	Southampton	2–0	Walsall	The Dell

15 April 1963 33	Cardiff City	2–2	Walsall	Ninian Park

16 April 1963 34	Walsall	2–1	Cardiff City	Fellows Park

20 April 1963 35	Walsall	1–1	Scunthorpe United	Fellows Park

24 April 1963 36	Derby County	2–0	Walsall	Baseball Ground

27 April 1963 37	Bury	0–0	Walsall	Gigg Lane

30 April 1963 38	Grimsby Town	3–1	Walsall	Blundell Park

4 May 1963 39	Rotherham United	1–2	Walsall	Millmoor

8 May 1963 40	Newcastle United	0–2	Walsall	St James' Park

14 May 1963 41	Walsall	3–1	Norwich City	Fellows Park

24 May 1963 42	Walsall	1–2	Charlton Athletic	Fellows Park

=== FA Cup ===
6 March 1963 Round 3	Walsall	0–1	Manchester City	Fellows Park

=== League Cup ===
25 September 1962 Round 2	Walsall	1–2	Stoke City	Fellows Park
			Matthews; Bebbington
