= Adi Viveash =

English footballer (born 1969)

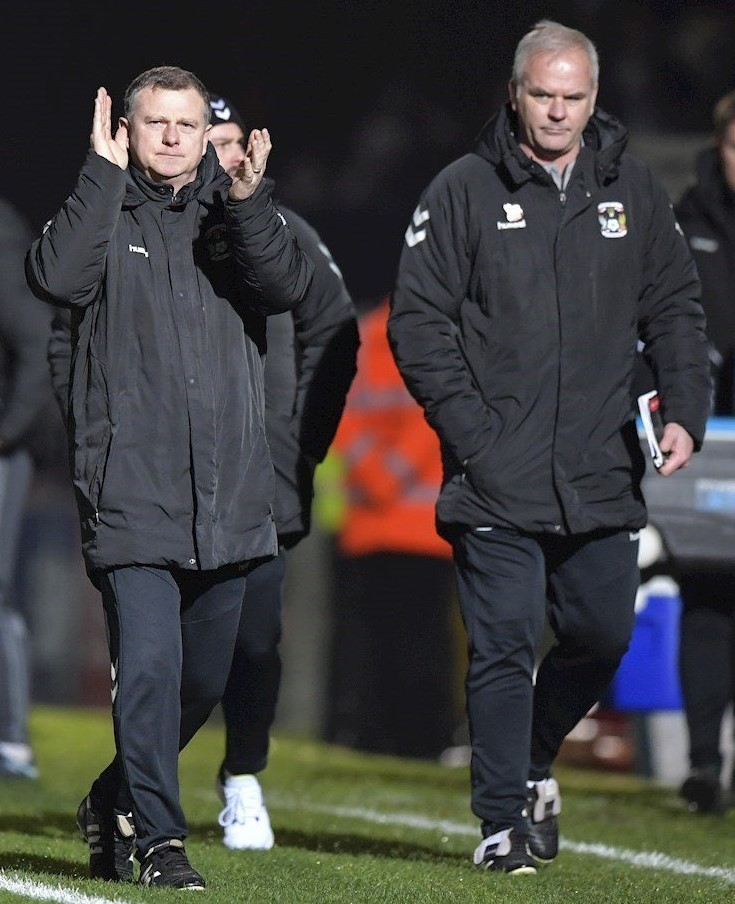
- Viveash (right) as assistant manager of Coventry City in 2020 with manager Mark Robins

Personal information
- Full name: Adrian Lee Viveash
- Date of birth: 30 September 1969 (age 57)
- Place of birth: Swindon, England
- Height: 6 ft 2 in (1.88 m)
- Position: Defender

Team information
- Current team: Middlesbrough (assistant head coach)

Youth career
- Swindon Town

Senior career*
Years	Team	Apps	(Gls)
1989–1995	Swindon Town	54	(3)
1992–1993	→ Reading (loan)	5	(0)
1994–1995	→ Reading (loan)	6	(0)
1995	→ Barnsley (loan)	2	(1)
1995–2000	Walsall	202	(13)
2000–2002	Reading	66	(3)
2002–2003	→ Oxford United (loan)	11	(0)
2003–2004	Swindon Town	15	(0)
2004	→ Kidderminster (loan)	7	(0)
2004	→ Kidderminster (loan)	7	(0)
2004–2005	Aldershot Town	6	(0)
2005–2007	Cirencester Town	44	(3)
Total		425	(23)

Managerial career
- 2007–2008: Cirencester Town
- 2017–2024: Coventry City (assistant)
- 2025–: Middlesbrough (assistant)
- 2025: Middlesbrough (caretaker)
- * Club domestic league appearances and goals

Adrian Lee Viveash (born 30 September 1969) is an English football coach and former professional player who is currently assistant head coach of EFL Championship club Middlesbrough.

Viveash is most known for his spells with Swindon, Reading and Walsall during the 1990s. He played in the Reading team which won the Division Two title in 1994, reached the Division One playoff final in 2000, and achieved promotion to the Championship in 2001. He also helped Walsall reach Division One in 1999.

== Playing career ==
Viveash began his career with home-town club Swindon Town before joining Walsall in 1995. After two loan spells earlier in his career Viveash joined Reading permanently on 3 July 2000 on a three-year contract. He joined Oxford United on loan on 6 October 2002 with a view to a permanent move but a deal could not be agreed and he returned to Reading after two months. Viveash was released by Reading following the 2002–03 season and made a return to Swindon on 27 June 2003.

On 2 March 2004 Viveash joined Kidderminster Harriers on loan until the end of the season and on 6 August he returned for another loan spell, this time for one month. He moved to Conference National side Aldershot Town on a short-term contract on 3 December 2004 after having his Swindon Town contract terminated by mutual consent the day before. He was released by Aldershot on 7 January 2005 and joined Cirencester Town later that month.

== Coaching career ==
In May 2007 he took over as manager of Cirencester Town. On 14 September 2008 Viveash resigned as manager after 16 months in charge to take up a coaching role with Chelsea's academy. His final match in charge was a 2–1 derby defeat by Cinderford Town in which Viveash was sent to the stands for protesting against Cinderford's equaliser.

In July 2011 Viveash became Under-18 team manager at Chelsea having previously served as assistant academy and assistant reserve team coach. In June 2014, following Dermot Drummy's promotion to international head coach, Adi Viveash took charge of the club's Under-21 squad for the 2014–15 season.

In May 2017, following nine successful years with Chelsea, Viveash left his role as development squad manager.

He joined Coventry City as assistant manager to Mark Robins in July 2017 following his departure from Chelsea. The pair subsequently led Coventry to two promotions in three seasons.

In May 2023, Viveash signed a new four-year contract at Coventry City.

On 1 July 2024, Coventry City announced that Viveash had left the club after seven years as assistant manager.

On 24 June 2025, Middlesbrough announced that Viveash would join Rob Edwards' backroom staff.
