= 1998–99 Reading F.C. season =

Reading
1998–99 season
- Chairman: John Madejski
- Manager: Tommy Burns
- Stadium: Madejski Stadium
- Second Division: 11th
- FA Cup: First Round vs Stoke City
- Football League Cup: Second Round vs Barnsley
- Football League Trophy: First Round vs Bournemouth
- Top goalscorer: League: Martin Williams (11); All: Martin Williams (11)
Home colours

The 1998–99 season was Reading's 128th year in existence and first season back in the Second Division, since the 1993–94 season, and covers the period from 1 July 1998 to 30 June 1999. Reading finished the season in 11th position, were knocked out of the FA Cup at the First Round by Stoke City, the Football League Cup by Barnsley in the Second Round and the First Round of the Football League Trophy by Bournemouth. It was the club's first full season with Tommy Burns as manager, and their first at their new Madejski Stadium.

== Squad ==
As of match played 8 May 1999

Name	Nationality	Position	Date of birth (Age (Note: Age as of the end of the season))	Signed from	Signed in	Contract ends	Apps.	Goals
Goalkeepers
Steve Mautone	(Australia)	GK	10 August 1970 (aged 28)	West Ham United	1997		34	0
Jamie Ashdown	(England)	GK	30 November 1980 (aged 18)	Trainee	1998		0	0
Nick Hammond	(England)	GK	7 September 1967 (aged 31)	Plymouth Argyle	1996		33	0
Peter van der Kwaak	(Netherlands)	GK	12 October 1968 (aged 30)	Dordrecht	1998		4	0
Scott Howie	(Scotland)	GK	4 January 1972 (aged 27)	Motherwell	1998		53	0
Defenders
Andy Bernal	(Australia)	DF	21 February 1973 (aged 26)	Sydney Olympic	1994		197	2
Tony Barras	(England)	DF	29 March 1971 (aged 28)	York City	1999		6	1
Jason Bristow	(England)	DF	23 April 1980 (aged 19)	Trainee	1998		0	0
Chris Casper	(England)	DF	28 April 1975 (aged 24)	Manchester United	1998		35	0
Andy Gurney	(England)	DF	25 January 1974 (aged 25)	Torquay United	1999		8	0
Graeme Murty	(England) (Note: Graeme Murty was born in Saltburn-by-the-Sea, England, but also qualified to represent Scotland internationally through his father, going on to make his debut for Scotland in 2004.)	DF	13 November 1974 (aged 24)	York City	1998		9	0
John Polston	(England)	DF	10 June 1968 (aged 30)	Norwich City	1998		4	0
Linvoy Primus	(England)	DF	14 September 1973 (aged 25)	Barnet	1997		79	1
Neville Stamp	(England)	DF	7 July 1981 (aged 17)	Trainee	1998		1	0
Elroy Kromheer	(Netherlands)	DF	15 January 1970 (aged 29)	Zwolle	1998		12	0
Barry Hunter	(Northern Ireland)	DF	18 November 1968 (aged 30)	Wrexham	1996		32	2
Alan Maybury	(Republic of Ireland)	DF	8 August 1978 (aged 20)	loan from Leeds United	1999	1999	8	0
Stuart Gray	(Scotland) (Note: Stuart Gray was born in Harrogate, England, but also qualified to represent Scotland internationally, representing Scotland U21 between 1995 and 1996.)	DF	18 December 1973 (aged 25)	Celtic	1998		38	2
Midfielders
Darren Caskey	(England)	MF	21 August 1974 (aged 24)	Tottenham Hotspur	1996		127	12
Sean Evers	(England)	MF	10 October 1977 (aged 21)	Luton Town	1999		1	0
Byron Glasgow	(England)	MF	18 February 1979 (aged 20)	Trainee	1996		44	1
Phil Hadland	(England)	MF	20 October 1980 (aged 18)	Trainee	1998		1	0
Lee Hodges	(England)	MF	4 September 1973 (aged 25)	Barnet	1997		36	6
Jamie Lambert	(England)	MF	14 September 1973 (aged 25)	Trainee	1992		152	20
Phil Parkinson	(England)	MF	1 December 1967 (aged 31)	Bury	1992		301	16
Jim Crawford	(Republic of Ireland) (Note: Jim Crawford was born in Chicago, United States, but also qualified to represent Republic of Ireland internationally, representing Republic of Ireland U21 between 1993 and 1994.)	MF	1 May 1973 (aged 26)	Newcastle United	1998		20	0
Ray Houghton	(Republic of Ireland)	MF	9 January 1962 (aged 37)	Crystal Palace	1997		56	1
Grant Brebner	(Scotland)	MF	6 December 1977 (aged 21)	Manchester United	1998		43	10
Andy McLaren	(Scotland)	MF	5 June 1973 (aged 25)	Dundee United	1999		7	1
Forwards
Paul Brayson	(England)	FW	16 September 1977 (aged 21)	Newcastle United	1998		37	1
Keith Scott	(England)	FW	9 June 1967 (aged 31)	Wycombe Wanderers	1999		9	2
Martin Williams	(England)	FW	12 July 1973 (aged 25)	Luton Town	1995		117	23
Mass Sarr	(Liberia)	FW	6 February 1973 (aged 26)	Hajduk Split	1998		32	3
Jim McIntyre	(Scotland)	FW	24 May 1972 (aged 26)	Kilmarnock	1998		40	6
Out on loan
Left during the season
Martyn Booty	(England)	DF	30 May 1971 (aged 27)	Crewe Alexandra	1996		82	2
Neil Clement	(England)	DF	3 October 1978 (aged 20)	loan from Chelsea	1998	1999	12	1
Keith McPherson	(England)	DF	11 September 1963 (aged 35)	Northampton Town	1990			
Chris Westwood	(England)	DF	13 February 1977 (aged 22)	Wolverhampton Wanderers	1998		0	0
Gareth Davies	(Wales) (Note: Gareth Davies was born in Hereford, England, but also qualified to represent Wales internationally, representing Wales U21.)	DF	11 December 1973 (aged 25)	Crystal Palace	1997		23	0
Andy Legg	(Wales)	DF	28 July 1966 (aged 32)	Birmingham City	1998		13	0
Andy Wright	(England)	MF	21 October 1978 (aged 20)	loan from Leeds United	1998	1988	3	0
Mark McKeever	(Republic of Ireland) (Note: Mark McKeever was born in Derry, Northern Ireland, but qualified to represent Republic of Ireland internationally, representing both the U19 and U21.)	MF	16 November 1978 (aged 20)	loan from Sheffield Wednesday	1999	1999	7	2
Mark Reilly	(Scotland)	MF	30 March 1969 (aged 30)	Kilmarnock	1998		8	0
Carl Asaba	(England)	FW	28 January 1973 (aged 26)	Brentford	1997		45	13
Neville Roach	(England)	FW	29 September 1978 (aged 20)	Trainee	1996		23	2
Tony Thorpe	(England)	FW	10 April 1974 (aged 25)	loan from Bristol City	1998	1998	6	1
Robert Fleck	(Scotland)	FW	11 August 1965 (aged 33)	Norwich City	1998		10	1
Jason Bowen	(Wales)	FW	24 August 1972 (aged 26)	Birmingham City	1997		22	1

=== Left club during season ===
Note: Flags indicate national team as defined under FIFA eligibility rules; some limited exceptions apply. Players may hold more than one non-FIFA nationality.

No.	Pos.	Nation	Player
—	DF	ENG	Martyn Booty (to Southend United)
—	DF	ENG	Neil Clement (loan return to Chelsea)
—	DF	ENG	Keith McPherson (to Brighton & Hove Albion)
—	DF	ENG	Chris Westwood (to Hartlepool United)
—	DF	WAL	Gareth Davies (to Swindon Town)
—	DF	WAL	Andy Legg (to Cardiff City)
—	MF	ENG	Andy Wright (loan return to Leeds United)

No.	Pos.	Nation	Player
—	MF	IRL	Mark McKeever (loan return to Sheffield Wednesday)
—	MF	SCO	Mark Reilly (to Kilmarnock)
—	FW	ENG	Carl Asaba (to Gillingham)
—	FW	ENG	Neville Roach (to Southend United)
—	FW	ENG	Tony Thorpe (to Bristol City)
—	FW	SCO	Robert Fleck (Retired)
—	FW	WAL	Jason Bowen (to Cardiff City)

== Transfers ==
=== In ===
Date	Position	Nationality	Name	From	Fee	Ref.
10 May 1998	MF	(Scotland)	Mark Reilly	Kilmarnock	Free	
25 May 1998	DF	(England)	John Polston	Norwich City	Free	
12 June 1998	MF	(Scotland)	Grant Brebner	Manchester United	£300,000	
6 July 1998	DF	(England)	Graeme Murty	York City	£700,000	
6 July 1998	FW	(England)	Mass Sarr	Hajduk Split	£158,000	
1 August 1998	GK	(Netherlands)	Peter van der Kwaak	Dordrecht	Free	
1 August 1998	DF	(England)	Chris Westwood	Wolverhampton Wanderers	Free	
1 August 1998	DF	(Netherlands)	Elroy Kromheer	Zwolle	£150,000	
1 August 1998	MF	(Scotland)	Grant Smith	Wycombe Wanderers	Free	
2 November 1998	DF	(England)	Chris Casper	Manchester United	£300,000	
13 January 1999	DF	(England)	Andy Gurney	Torquay United	£100,000	
25 March 1999	DF	(England)	Tony Barras	York City	£20,000	
25 March 1999	FW	(England)	Keith Scott	Wycombe Wanderers	£250,000	
25 March 1999	MF	(England)	Sean Evers	Luton Town	£500,000	
25 March 1999	MF	(Scotland)	Andy McLaren	Dundee United	£100,000	

=== Loan in ===
Date from	Position	Nationality	Name	From	Date to	Ref.
18 November 1998	DF	(England)	Neil Clement	Chelsea	13 February 1999	
8 December 1998	MF	(England)	Andy Wright	Leeds United	19 December 1998	
5 February 1999	FW	(England)	Tony Thorpe	Bristol City	24 March 1999	
8 March 1999	FW	(Republic of Ireland)	Mark McKeever	Sheffield Wednesday	12 April 1999	
19 March 1999	DF	(England)	Tony Barras	York City	24 March 1999	
25 March 1999	DF	(Republic of Ireland)	Alan Maybury	Leeds United	End of Season	

=== Out ===
Date	Position	Nationality	Name	To	Fee	Ref.
10 August 1998	FW	(England)	Carl Asaba	Gillingham	£590,000	
4 November 1998	MF	(Scotland)	Mark Reilly	Kilmarnock	Undisclosed	
4 March 1999	FW	(England)	Neville Roach	Southend United	£30,000	
19 March 1999	MF	(England)	Ross Harrison	Stevenage	Undisclosed	
19 March 1999	DF	(England)	Keith McPherson	Brighton & Hove Albion	Undisclosed	

=== Released ===
Date	Position	Nationality	Name	Joined	Date
4 November 1998	DF	(Wales)	Andy Legg	Cardiff City	4 November 1998
15 January 1999	FW	(Wales)	Jason Bowen	Cardiff City	15 January 1999
18 February 1999	FW	(Scotland)	Robert Fleck	Retired	
19 February 1999	DF	(England)	Martyn Booty	Southend United	19 February 1999
2 March 1999	DF	(Wales)	Gareth Davies	Swindon Town	2 March 1999
19 March 1999	DF	(England)	Chris Westwood	Hartlepool United	19 March 1999
19 March 1999	MF	(Scotland)	Grant Smith	Heart of Midlothian	19 March 1999
30 June 1999	DF	(England)	Jason Bristow	Basingstoke Town	
30 June 1999	MF	(England)	Jamie Lambert	Oxford United	27 August 1999
30 June 1999	MF	(Republic of Ireland)	Ray Houghton	Stevenage Borough	24 September 1999

== Results ==
=== Second Division ===
==== Results ====
8 August 1998 1	Wrexham	3–0	Reading	Wrexham
	Connolly 35'; Legg 50' (o.g.); Ward 61' (yellow card); McGregor (yellow card); Chalk (yellow card); Owen (yellow card)	Report	Lambert (yellow card)	Stadium: Racecourse Ground; Attendance: 6,671; Referee: R.Pearson

15 August 1998 2	Bristol Rovers	4–1	Reading	Bristol
	Hayles 32'; Meaker 36'; Cureton 40' (pen.); Roberts 84'; Andreasson (yellow card)	Report	Williams 7'; Brebner (yellow card); Parkinson (yellow card)	Stadium: Memorial Ground; Attendance: 7,529; Referee: Paul Rejer

22 August 1998 3	Reading	3–0	Luton Town	Reading
	Brebner 10'; McIntyre 51'; Fleck 84'; Kromheer (yellow card)	Report	McGowan (yellow card); Evers (yellow card); Gray (yellow card); George (yellow card)	Stadium: Madejski Stadium; Attendance: 18,108; Referee: Rob Styles

29 August 1998 4	Chesterfield	1–0	Reading	Chesterfield
	Howard 35'; Williams (yellow card)	Report	Sarr (yellow card)	Stadium: Saltergate; Attendance: 4,145; Referee: David Laws

9 September 1998 5	Reading	1–1	Burnley	Reading
	Williams 28'; Brebner (yellow card)	Report	Swan (red card) 35'; Payton 76'; Scott (yellow card)	Stadium: Madejski Stadium; Attendance: 10,080; Referee: Paul Danson

12 September 1998 6	Preston North End	4–0	Reading	Preston
	Jackson 19', 34'; Eyres 36', 74'	Report	Sarr (yellow card) (yellow-red card) 32'; Booty (yellow card); Brebner (yellow card)	Stadium: Deepdale; Attendance: 9,836; Referee: Matt Messias

19 September 1998 7	Reading	1–1	Colchester United	Reading
	Williams 17'; Glasgow (yellow card)	Report	Duguid 87' (yellow card); Forbes (yellow card)	Stadium: Madejski Stadium; Attendance: 9,058; Referee: D.Pugh

26 September 1998 8	Macclesfield Town	2–1	Reading	Macclesfield
	Holt 25'; Askey 77'; Hitchen (yellow card)	Report	Williams 60' (pen.); Booty (yellow card)	Stadium: Moss Rose; Attendance: 2,920; Referee: Mike Pike

30 September 1998 9	Walsall	0–2	Reading	Walsall
	Viveash (yellow card); Keates (yellow card)	Report	Williams 8' (yellow card); Brebner 66'	Stadium: Bescot Stadium; Attendance: 3,729; Referee: J.A.Kirkby

3 October 1998 10	Reading	2–1	Stoke City	Reading
	Brebner 44'; McIntyre 73'; Howie (yellow card)	Report	Whittle 69'; Robinson (yellow card); Thorne (yellow card)	Stadium: Madejski Stadium; Attendance: 13,089; Referee: Peter Walton

17 October 1998 11	Reading	0–0	Gillingham	Reading
	Glasgow (yellow card)	Report	Williams (yellow card)	Stadium: Madejski Stadium; Attendance: 11,467; Referee: Anthony Leake

21 October 1998 12	Reading	1–1	Blackpool	Reading
	Williams 86'; Casper (yellow card) 90' (yellow-red card)	Report	Bryan 90'; Carlisle (yellow card); Hills (yellow card)	Stadium: Madejski Stadium; Attendance: 8,450; Referee: Ray Olivier

24 October 1998 13	Manchester City	0–1	Reading	Manchester
	Tiatto (red card) 20'; Whitley (yellow card); Dickov (yellow card)	Report	Williams 56'; Glasgow (yellow card); Sarr (yellow card)	Stadium: Maine Road; Attendance: 24,365; Referee: P.R.Richards

31 October 1998 14	Wycombe Wanderers	2–3	Reading	High Wycombe
	Lawrence 32'; Cousins 80'; Mohan (yellow card) 85' (yellow-red card); Beeton (yellow card); Brown (yellow card)	Report	Brebner 3', 9'; Williams 71' (yellow card); Caskey (yellow card); Parkinson (yellow card)	Stadium: Adams Park; Attendance: 6,373; Referee: C.R.Wilkes

4 November 1998 15	Reading	1–0	York City	Reading
	Brebner 31'; Bernal (yellow card); Caskey (yellow card)	Report	Jones (yellow card); Tinkler (yellow card); Agnew (yellow card)	Stadium: Madejski Stadium; Attendance: 7,914; Referee: M.Fletcher

7 November 1998 16	Reading	3–3	Bournemouth	Reading
	Caskey 7'; Williams 44'; Parkinson 80'; Brebner (yellow card); Glasgow (yellow card)	Report	Warren 40'; Stein 51' (pen.), 89'; Howe (yellow card); Berthé (yellow card)	Stadium: Madejski Stadium; Attendance: 13,004; Referee: Steve Baines

11 November 1998 17	Reading	0–1	Wigan Athletic	Reading
	Howie (yellow card); Primus (yellow card)	Report	Bradshaw 8' (pen.); Balmer (yellow card); Green (yellow card); Greenall (yellow card); Kilford (yellow card); Haworth (yellow card)	Stadium: Madejski Stadium; Attendance: 9,317; Referee: Alan Wiley

21 November 1998 18	Northampton Town	0–1	Reading	Northampton
	Hodgson (yellow card); Hunter (yellow card)	Report	Brebner 61'; McIntyre (yellow card)	Stadium: Sixfields Stadium; Attendance: 5,970; Referee: Mike Dean

28 November 1998 19	Reading	2–1	Lincoln City	Reading
	Clement 46'; Sarr 67'; Casper (yellow card); Caskey (yellow card)	Report	Holmes 2' (pen.); Fleming (yellow card)	Stadium: Madejski Stadium; Attendance: 8,694; Referee: Bill Jordan

12 December 1998 20	Millwall	1–1	Reading	Bermondsey
	Neill 33'; Lavin (yellow card); Newman (yellow card); Cahill (yellow card)	Report	Sarr 67'; Clement (yellow card); McPherson (yellow card); Parkinson (yellow card)	Stadium: The Den; Attendance: 6,058; Referee: Paul Taylor

19 December 1998 21	Reading	1–1	Oldham Athletic	Reading
	McIntyre 29'; Kromheer (yellow card); Crawford (yellow card)	Report	Allott 56'; Thom (yellow card); Rickers (yellow card); Sheridan (yellow card); Reid (yellow card)	Stadium: Madejski Stadium; Attendance: 9,390; Referee: Keith Hill

28 December 1998 22	Reading	1–0	Notts County	Reading
	Richardson 24' (o.g.); Brebner (yellow card); Parkinson (yellow card); McIntyre (yellow card); Sarr (yellow card)	Report	Redmile (yellow card); Hughes (yellow card)	Stadium: Madejski Stadium; Attendance: 13,026; Referee: Rob Styles

2 January 1999 23	Reading	1–2	Chesterfield	Reading
	Sarr 88'; Casper (yellow card)	Report	Curtis 33'; Breckin 44'; Curtis (yellow card)	Stadium: Madejski Stadium; Attendance: 10,409; Referee: Chris Foy

9 January 1999 24	Reading	4–0	Wrexham	Reading
	Williams 7' (pen.), 53' (pen.); Brebner 44'; Parkinson 82'; Casper (yellow card); Caskey (yellow card)	Report	Spink (yellow card); Brammer (yellow card)	Stadium: Madejski Stadium; Attendance: 8,087; Referee: M.E.Pierce

16 January 1999 25	Reading	0–6	Bristol Rovers	Reading
	Clement (yellow card); McPherson (yellow card); McIntyre (yellow card); Sarr (yellow card)	Report	Cureton 49', 57' (pen.), 63', 70'; Roberts 88', 90'; Lee (yellow card); Challis (yellow card); Léoni (yellow card)	Stadium: Madejski Stadium; Attendance: 13,258; Referee: Barry Knight

23 January 1999 26	York City	1–1	Reading	York
	Rowe 71'	Report	Bernal (red card) 61'; Parkinson 80'; Caskey (yellow card); Parkinson (yellow card); Williams	Stadium: Bootham Crescent; Attendance: 3,274; Referee: D.Pugh

30 January 1999 27	Notts County	1–1	Reading	Nottingham
	Owers 77'; Liburd (yellow card); Dyer (yellow card); Owers (yellow card)	Report	Glasgow 17'	Stadium: Meadow Lane; Attendance: 5,192

6 February 1999 28	Reading	0–1	Walsall	Reading
		Report	Keates 44'; Pointon (yellow card)	Stadium: Madejski Stadium; Attendance: 9,481; Referee: Andy D'Urso

13 February 1999 29	Burnley	1–1	Reading	Burnley
	Reid 90'; Davis (yellow card); Morgan (yellow card); Mellon (yellow card)	Report	Caskey 54' (yellow card); Parkinson (yellow card)	Stadium: Turf Moor; Attendance: 9,366; Referee: K.M.Lynch

20 February 1999 30	Reading	2–1	Preston North End	Reading
	Caskey 55'; Thorpe 90' (pen.); Parkinson (yellow card)	Report	Basham 80'	Stadium: Madejski Stadium; Attendance: 10,937; Referee: D.R.Crick

23 February 1999 31	Fulham	3–1	Reading	Fulham
	Horsfield 49', 51' (yellow card); Symons 67'; Albert (yellow card); Peschisolido (yellow card)	Report	Brebner 3'; Thorpe (yellow card)	Stadium: Craven Cottage; Attendance: 11,247; Referee: Mike Jones

27 February 1999 32	Colchester United	1–1	Reading	Colchester
	Gregory 8'; Aspinall (yellow card); Williams (yellow card); Dozzell (yellow card)	Report	Parkinson 81'; Primus (yellow card)	Stadium: Layer Road; Attendance: 4,686; Referee: Anthony Bates

6 March 1999 33	Reading	1–0	Macclesfield Town	Reading
	Caskey 62'	Report		Stadium: Madejski Stadium; Attendance: 8,085; Referee: Mark Halsey

10 March 1999 34	Stoke City	0–4	Reading	Stoke-on-Trent
		Report	McKeever 59'; McIntyre 76', 82'; Gray 87'	Stadium: Britannia Stadium; Attendance: 8,280; Referee: M.Cowburn

13 March 1999 35	Bournemouth	0–1	Reading	Bournemouth
	Young (yellow card) 73'; Vincent (yellow card); Hayter (yellow card); Fletcher (yellow card)	Report	McKeever 76'; Bernal (yellow card); Houghton (yellow card); Caskey (yellow card); Parkinson (yellow card); McIntyre (yellow card)	Stadium: Dean Court; Attendance: 9,445; Referee: Keith Hill

20 March 1999 36	Reading	2–1	Wycombe Wanderers	Reading
	McIntyre 28' (yellow card); Bernal (red card) 39'; Caskey 73'; Gray (yellow card)	Report	Devine 80'; Brown (yellow card); Simpson (yellow card); Emblen (yellow card)	Stadium: Madejski Stadium; Attendance: 10,298; Referee: Paul Danson

23 March 1999 37	Luton Town	1–1	Reading	Luton
	Spring 13'; McLaren (red card) 90'; McGowan (yellow card)	Report	Barras 84'; Casper (yellow card)	Stadium: Kenilworth Road; Attendance: 5,527; Referee: L.Cable

27 March 1999 38	Reading	1–3	Manchester City	Reading
	Maybury (red card) 61'; Scott 90'; Caskey (yellow card); McLaren (yellow card)	Report	Cooke 31', 62'; Goater 54' (yellow card); Dickov (yellow card)	Stadium: Madejski Stadium; Attendance: 20,055; Referee: Paul Rejer

1 April 1999 39	Gillingham	2–1	Reading	Gillingham
	Saunders 4'; Asaba 64'; Southall (yellow card); Hessenthaler (yellow card)	Report	Scott 77'; Casper (yellow card); McIntyre (yellow card)	Stadium: Priestfield Stadium; Attendance: 8,195

5 April 1999 40	Reading	0–1	Fulham	Reading
	Casper (yellow card); Maybury (yellow card)	Report	Morgan 77' (yellow card); Horsfield (yellow card)	Stadium: Madejski Stadium; Attendance: 18,741; Referee: M.J.Brandwood

10 April 1999 41	Blackpool	2–0	Reading	Blackpool
	Aldridge 31' (pen.); Clarkson 47'	Report	Hunter (yellow card)	Stadium: Bloomfield Road; Attendance: 3,617; Referee: Jarnail Singh

13 April 1999 42	Lincoln City	2–2	Reading	Lincoln
	Barnett 53'; Thorpe 78'	Report	Caskey 40', 84'; Casper (yellow card)	Stadium: Sincil Bank; Attendance: 2,518; Referee: G.B.Frankland

17 April 1999 43	Reading	0–1	Northampton Town	Reading
	Brebner (yellow card)	Report	Savage 89'; Howey (yellow card); Howard (yellow card)	Stadium: Madejski Stadium; Attendance: 10,132; Referee: Ray Olivier

24 April 1999 44	Wigan Athletic	4–1	Reading	Wigan
	Rodgers 6'; Barlow 15', 24'; Greenall 69'	Report	McLaren 67'; Casper (yellow card)	Stadium: Springfield Park; Attendance: 3,885; Referee: T.Jones

1 May 1999 45	Reading	2–0	Millwall	Reading
	Parkinson 23'; Gray 31'; Caskey (yellow card)	Report	Fitzgerald (yellow card); Harris (yellow card)	Stadium: Madejski Stadium; Attendance: 7,943; Referee: B.Coddington

8 May 1999 46	Oldham Athletic	2–0	Reading	Oldham
	Innes 5' (yellow card); Rickers 27'	Report		Stadium: Boundary Park; Attendance: 7,724; Referee: R.D.Furnandiz

==== League table ====
Pos	Team	Pld	W	D	L	GF	GA	GD	Pts
9	Chesterfield	46	17	13	16	46	44	+2	64
10	Millwall	46	17	11	18	52	59	−7	62
11	Reading	46	16	13	17	54	63	−9	61
12	Luton Town	46	16	10	20	51	60	−9	58
13	Bristol Rovers	46	13	17	16	65	56	+9	56

Rules for classification: 1) Points; 2) Goals scored; 3) Goal difference

=== FA Cup ===
14 November 1998 First Round	Reading	0–1	Stoke City	Reading
GMT (UTC)	Casper (yellow card); Bernal (yellow card); Williams (yellow card)	Report	Lightbourne 27'; Kavanagh (yellow card)	Stadium: Madejski Stadium; Attendance: 10,095; Referee: G.P.Barber

=== League Cup ===
11 August 1998 First Round 1st leg	Peterborough United	1–1	Reading	Peterborough
BST (UTC+1)	Carruthers 50'; Bodley (yellow card)	Report	Asaba 79'; Parkinson (yellow card); McIntyre (yellow card)	Stadium: London Road; Attendance: 2,187; Referee: Steve Bennett

26 August 1998 First Round 2nd leg	Reading	2–0 (3–1 agg.)	Peterborough United	Reading
BST (UTC+1)	Caskey 40' (pen.); Brebner 88'	Report		Stadium: Madejski Stadium; Attendance: 9,151

15 September 1998 Second Round 1st leg	Barnsley	3–0	Reading	Barnsley
BST (UTC+1)	Barnard 22'; Fjørtoft 59', 86'	Report		Stadium: Oakwell; Attendance: 7,840; Referee: G.Cain

23 September 1998 Second Round 2nd leg	Reading	1–1 (1–4 agg.)	Barnsley	Reading
BST (UTC+1)	Caskey 90' (pen.); Parkinson (yellow card)	Report	Ward 85'; Richardson (yellow card)	Stadium: Madejski Stadium; Attendance: 6,983; Referee: D.R.Crick

=== League Trophy ===
8 December 1998 First Round	Bournemouth	2–0	Reading	Bournemouth
GMT (UTC)	Fletcher 9'; Cox 76'	Report		Stadium: Dean Court; Attendance: 2,666; Referee: Mark Halsey

== Squad statistics ==
As of match played 8 May 1999

=== Appearances and goals ===
No.	Pos	Nat	Player	Total		First Division		FA Cup		League Cup		League Trophy	
No.	Pos	Nat	Player	Apps	Goals	Apps	Goals	Apps	Goals	Apps	Goals	Apps	Goals
	GK	(England) ENG	Nick Hammond	2	0	1	0	0	0	1	0	0	0
	GK	(Netherlands) NED	Peter van der Kwaak	4	0	3	0	0	0	1	0	0	0
	GK	(Scotland) SCO	Scott Howie	46	0	42	0	1	0	2	0	1	0
	DF	(Australia) AUS	Andy Bernal	23	0	18+4	0	1	0	0	0	0	0
	DF	(England) ENG	Tony Barras	6	1	4+2	1	0	0	0	0	0	0
	DF	(England) ENG	Chris Casper	35	0	32	0	1	0	1	0	1	0
	DF	(England) ENG	Andy Gurney	8	0	5+3	0	0	0	0	0	0	0
	DF	(England) ENG	Graeme Murty	9	0	8+1	0	0	0	0	0	0	0
	DF	(England) ENG	John Polston	4	0	4	0	0	0	0	0	0	0
	DF	(England) ENG	Linvoy Primus	36	0	31	0	1	0	3	0	1	0
	DF	(England) ENG	Neville Stamp	1	0	0+1	0	0	0	0	0	0	0
	DF	(Netherlands) NED	Elroy Kromheer	12	0	11	0	0	0	1	0	0	0
	DF	(Northern Ireland) NIR	Barry Hunter	3	0	2+1	0	0	0	0	0	0	0
	DF	(Republic of Ireland) IRL	Alan Maybury	8	0	8	0	0	0	0	0	0	0
	DF	(Scotland) SCO	Stuart Gray	31	2	25+2	2	0	0	4	0	0	0
	MF	(England) ENG	Darren Caskey	48	9	42	7	1	0	3+1	2	1	0
	MF	(England) ENG	Sean Evers	1	0	0+1	0	0	0	0	0	0	0
	MF	(England) ENG	Byron Glasgow	36	1	28+4	1	1	0	2	0	1	0
	MF	(England) ENG	Phil Hadland	1	0	0	0	0	0	1	0	0	0
	MF	(England) ENG	Lee Hodges	1	0	0+1	0	0	0	0	0	0	0
	MF	(England) ENG	Jamie Lambert	1	0	1	0	0	0	0	0	0	0
	MF	(England) ENG	Phil Parkinson	46	5	42	5	0	0	3	0	1	0
	MF	(Republic of Ireland) IRL	Jim Crawford	14	0	9+2	0	1	0	1	0	1	0
	MF	(Republic of Ireland) IRL	Ray Houghton	21	0	13+5	0	0	0	2+1	0	0	0
	MF	(Scotland) SCO	Grant Brebner	43	10	36+3	9	1	0	3	1	0	0
	MF	(Scotland) SCO	Andy McLaren	7	1	7	1	0	0	0	0	0	0
	FW	(England) ENG	Paul Brayson	31	0	13+15	0	1	0	0+1	0	1	0
	FW	(England) ENG	Keith Scott	9	2	5+4	2	0	0	0	0	0	0
	FW	(England) ENG	Martin Williams	31	11	20+6	11	1	0	2+2	0	0	0
	FW	(Liberia) LBR	Mass Sarr	32	3	18+10	3	0+1	0	2	0	0+1	0
	FW	(Scotland) SCO	Jim McIntyre	34	6	22+10	6	0	0	1	0	1	0
Players away on loan:
Players who appeared for Reading but left during the season:
	DF	(England) ENG	Martyn Booty	12	0	7+1	0	0	0	4	0	0	0
	DF	(England) ENG	Neil Clement	12	1	11	1	0	0	0	0	1	0
	DF	(England) ENG	Keith McPherson	18	0	13+2	0	1	0	2	0	0	0
	DF	(Wales) WAL	Gareth Davies	1	0	1	0	0	0	0	0	0	0
	DF	(Wales) WAL	Andy Legg	3	0	2	0	0	0	1	0	0	0
	MF	(England) ENG	Andy Wright	3	0	0+2	0	0	0	0	0	0+1	0
	MF	(Republic of Ireland) IRL	Mark McKeever	7	2	6+1	2	0	0	0	0	0	0
	MF	(Scotland) SCO	Mark Reilly	8	0	4+2	0	0	0	2	0	0	0
	FW	(England) ENG	Carl Asaba	3	1	0+1	0	0	0	0+2	1	0	0
	FW	(England) ENG	Neville Roach	7	0	3+2	0	0+1	0	0	0	0+1	0
	FW	(England) ENG	Tony Thorpe	6	1	6	1	0	0	0	0	0	0
	FW	(Scotland) SCO	Robert Fleck	5	1	2+2	1	0	0	1	0	0	0
	FW	(Wales) WAL	Jason Bowen	2	0	1	0	0	0	1	0	0	0

=== Goal scorers ===
Place	Position	Nation	Name	Second Division	FA Cup	League Cup	League Trophy	Total
1	FW	(England)	Martin Williams	11	0	0	0	11
2	MF	(Scotland)	Grant Brebner	9	0	1	0	10
3	MF	(England)	Darren Caskey	7	0	2	0	9
4	FW	(Scotland)	Jim McIntyre	6	0	0	0	6
5	MF	(England)	Phil Parkinson	5	0	0	0	5
6	FW	(Liberia)	Mass Sarr	3	0	0	0	3
7	DF	(Scotland)	Stuart Gray	2	0	0	0	2
7	FW	(Republic of Ireland)	Mark McKeever	2	0	0	0	2
7	FW	(England)	Keith Scott	2	0	0	0	2
10	DF	(England)	Tony Barras	1	0	0	0	1
10	DF	(England)	Neil Clement	1	0	0	0	1
10	FW	(Scotland)	Robert Fleck	1	0	0	0	1
10	MF	(England)	Byron Glasgow	1	0	0	0	1
10	MF	(Scotland)	Andy McLaren	1	0	0	0	1
10	FW	(England)	Tony Thorpe	1	0	0	0	1
10	FW	(England)	Carl Asaba	0	0	1	0	1
10			Own goal	1	0	0	0	1
Total				54	0	4	0	58

=== Clean sheets ===
Place	Position	Nation	Name	Second Division	FA Cup	League Cup	League Trophy	Total
1	GK	(Scotland)	Scott Howie	11	0	1	0	12
2	GK	(Netherlands)	Peter van der Kwaak	1	0	0	0	1
Total				12	0	1	0	13

=== Disciplinary record ===
Position	Nation	Name	First Division		FA Cup		League Cup		League Trophy		Total	
Position	Nation	Name	Yellow card	Red card	Yellow card	Red card	Yellow card	Red card	Yellow card	Red card	Yellow card	Red card
GK	(Scotland)	Scott Howie	2	0	0	0	0	0	0	0	2	0
DF	(Australia)	Andy Bernal	2	2	1	0	0	0	0	0	3	2
DF	(England)	Chris Casper	10	1	1	0	0	0	0	0	11	1
DF	(England)	Linvoy Primus	2	0	0	0	0	0	0	0	2	0
DF	(Netherlands)	Elroy Kromheer	2	0	0	0	0	0	0	0	2	0
DF	(Northern Ireland)	Barry Hunter	1	0	0	0	0	0	0	0	1	0
DF	(Republic of Ireland)	Alan Maybury	1	1	0	0	0	0	0	0	1	1
DF	(Scotland)	Stuart Gray	1	0	0	0	0	0	0	0	1	0
MF	(England)	Darren Caskey	9	0	0	0	0	0	0	0	9	0
MF	(England)	Byron Glasgow	4	0	0	0	0	0	0	0	4	0
MF	(England)	Jamie Lambert	1	0	0	0	0	0	0	0	1	0
MF	(England)	Phil Parkinson	8	0	0	0	2	0	0	0	10	0
MF	(Republic of Ireland)	Jim Crawford	1	0	0	0	0	0	0	0	1	0
MF	(Republic of Ireland)	Ray Houghton	1	0	0	0	0	0	0	0	1	0
MF	(Scotland)	Grant Brebner	6	0	0	0	0	0	0	0	6	0
MF	(Scotland)	Andy McLaren	1	0	0	0	0	0	0	0	1	0
FW	(England)	Martin Williams	3	0	1	0	0	0	0	0	4	0
FW	(Liberia)	Mass Sarr	6	1	0	0	0	0	0	0	6	1
FW	(Scotland)	Jim McIntyre	6	0	0	0	1	0	0	0	7	0
Players away on loan:
Players who left Reading during the season:
DF	(England)	Martyn Booty	2	0	0	0	0	0	0	0	2	0
DF	(England)	Neil Clement	2	0	0	0	0	0	0	0	2	0
DF	(England)	Keith McPherson	2	0	0	0	0	0	0	0	2	0
FW	(England)	Tony Thorpe	1	0	0	0	0	0	0	0	1	0
Total			74	5	3	0	3	0	0	0	80	5
