= 1999–2000 Reading F.C. season =

Reading
1999–2000 season
- Chairman: John Madejski
- Manager: Tommy Burns (until 17 September); Alan Pardew (caretaker, 17 September-13 October); Alan Pardew (from 13 October)
- Second Division: 10th
- FA Cup: Third Round vs Plymouth Argyle
- League Cup: Second Round vs Bradford City
- League Trophy: Semi Final vs Bristol City
- Top goalscorer: League: Darren Caskey (17); All: Darren Caskey (23)
Home colours

The 1999–2000 season was Reading F.C.'s second consecutive season in Division Two, following their relegation from the Division One in 1998.

== Season events ==
In July, midfielder Byron Glasgow tested positive cocaine and cannabis, and was subsequently sacked by the club.

On 17 September, Manager Tommy Burns and Assistant Manager Packie Bonner where sacked by the club due to poor results, with Alan Pardew being announced as the Caretaker Manager.

In February, Andy McLaren become the second Reading player to test positive for cocaine within the last year, and was sacked by the club.

== Squad ==
As of match played 6 May 2000

No.	Name	Nationality	Position	Date of birth (Age (Note: Age as of the end of the season))	Signed from	Signed in	Contract ends	Apps.	Goals
Goalkeepers
1	Scott Howie	(Scotland)	GK	4 January 1972 (aged 28)	Motherwell	1998		100	0
25	Peter van der Kwaak	(Netherlands)	GK	12 October 1968 (aged 31)	Dordrecht	1998		5	0
27	Phil Whitehead	(England)	GK	17 December 1969 (aged 30)	West Bromwich Albion	1999		13	0
40	Jamie Ashdown	(England)	GK	30 November 1980 (aged 19)	Academy	1998		0	0
Defenders
2	John Polston	(England)	DF	10 June 1968 (aged 31)	Norwich City	1998		24	1
3	Stuart Gray	(Scotland) (Note: Stuart Gray was born in Harrogate, England, but also qualified to represent Scotland internationally, representing Scotland U21 between 1995 and 1996.)	DF	18 December 1973 (aged 26)	Celtic	1998		59	2
5	Linvoy Primus	(England)	DF	14 September 1973 (aged 26)	Barnet	1997		114	1
6	Barry Hunter	(Northern Ireland)	DF	18 November 1968 (aged 31)	Wrexham	1996		71	5
7	Chris Casper	(England)	DF	28 April 1975 (aged 25)	Manchester United	1998		55	0
14	Graeme Murty	(England) (Note: Graeme Murty was born in Saltburn-by-the-Sea, England, but also qualified to represent Scotland internationally through his father, going on to make his debut for Scotland in 2004.)	DF	13 November 1974 (aged 25)	York City	1998		33	0
16	Matthew Robinson	(England)	DF	23 December 1974 (aged 25)	Portsmouth	2000		20	0
18	Andy Gurney	(England)	DF	25 January 1974 (aged 26)	Torquay United	1999		57	2
20	Andy Bernal	(Australia)	DF	21 February 1973 (aged 27)	Sydney Olympic	1994		231	4
23	John Mackie	(England)	DF	5 July 1976 (aged 23)	Sutton United	1999		0	0
28	Ricky Newman	(England)	DF	5 August 1970 (aged 29)	loan from Millwall	2000	2000	7	1
29	Ady Williams	(Wales) (Note: Ady Williams was born in Reading, England, but also qualified to represent Wales internationally through his father, and would make his international debut for Wales on 23 May 1994.)	DF	16 September 1971 (aged 28)	loan from Wolverhampton Wanderers	2000	2000		
33	Adam Lockwood	(England)	DF	26 October 1981 (aged 18)	Academy	1999		0	0
36	Chris Smith	(England)	DF	30 June 1981 (aged 18)	Academy	1999		0	0
37	Neville Stamp	(England)	DF	7 July 1981 (aged 18)	Academy	1998		1	0
42	Ricky Allaway	(England)	DF	12 February 1983 (aged 17)	Academy	1999		0	0
Midfielders
4	Phil Parkinson	(England)	MF	1 December 1967 (aged 32)	Bury	1992		330	17
8	Darren Caskey	(England)	MF	21 August 1974 (aged 25)	Tottenham Hotspur	1996		184	35
11	Peter Grant	(Scotland)	MF	30 August 1965 (aged 34)	Norwich City	1999		38	1
15	Sean Evers	(England)	MF	10 October 1977 (aged 22)	Luton Town	1999		26	0
19	Jim Crawford	(Republic of Ireland) (Note: Jim Crawford was born in Chicago, United States, but also qualified to represent Republic of Ireland internationally, representing Republic of Ireland U21 between 1993 and 1994.)	MF	1 May 1973 (aged 27)	Newcastle United	1998		28	1
22	Lee Hodges	(England)	MF	4 September 1973 (aged 26)	Barnet	1997		65	7
26	Neil Smith	(England)	MF	30 September 1971 (aged 28)	Fulham	1999		43	1
31	Adam Beasley	(England)	MF		Academy	1999		0	0
32	Phil Hadland	(England)	MF	20 October 1980 (aged 19)	Academy	1998		1	0
34	Alex Haddow	(England)	MF	8 January 1982 (aged 18)	Academy	1999		3	0
35	Steve Osborne	(England)	MF		Academy	1999		0	0
41	Sammy Igoe	(England)	MF	30 September 1975 (aged 24)	Portsmouth	2000		6	0
Forwards
9	Jim McIntyre	(Scotland)	FW	24 May 1972 (aged 27)	Kilmarnock	1998		74	11
10	Nicky Forster	(England)	FW	8 September 1973 (aged 26)	Birmingham City	1999		44	10
12	Keith Scott	(England)	FW	9 June 1967 (aged 32)	Wycombe Wanderers	1999		43	8
17	Martin Williams	(England)	FW	12 July 1973 (aged 26)	Luton Town	1995		156	29
24	Mass Sarr	(Liberia)	FW	6 February 1973 (aged 26)	Hajduk Split	1998		38	3
30	Martin Butler	(England)	FW	15 September 1974 (aged 25)	Cambridge United	2000		18	4
38	Nathan Tyson	(England)	FW	4 May 1982 (aged 17)	Academy	1999		1	0
39	Darius Henderson	(England)	FW	7 September 1981 (aged 18)	Academy	1999		6	0
Out on loan
21	Paul Brayson	(England)	FW	16 September 1977 (aged 22)	Newcastle United	1998		47	1
Left during the season
11	Grant Brebner	(Scotland)	MF	6 December 1977 (aged 22)	Manchester United	1998		46	11
13	Nick Hammond	(England)	GK	7 September 1967 (aged 32)	Plymouth Argyle	1996		33	0
16	Andy McLaren	(Scotland)	MF	5 June 1973 (aged 26)	Dundee United	1999		11	1
23	Elroy Kromheer	(Netherlands)	DF	15 January 1970 (aged 30)	Zwolle	1998		12	0
26	Steve Mautone	(Australia)	GK	10 August 1970 (aged 29)	West Ham United	1997		34	0
28	Mark Bowen	(Wales)	DF	7 December 1963 (aged 36)	Wigan Athletic	1999		1	0
28	Mark Nicholls	(England)	FW	30 May 1977 (aged 22)	loan from Chelsea	1999	2000	7	3
29	Graham Potter	(England)	DF	20 May 1975 (aged 24)	loan from West Bromwich Albion	1999	1999	5	0
30	Kevin Lisbie	(England) (Note: Kevin Lisbie was born in Hackney, England, but also qualified to represent Jamaica internationally, going on to make his international debut for Jamaica in 2002.)	FW	17 October 1978 (aged 21)	loan from Charlton Athletic	1999	1999	2	0
	Shaun Allaway	(England)	GK	16 February 1983 (aged 17)	Academy	1999		0	0

=== Out on loan ===
Note: Flags indicate national team as defined under FIFA eligibility rules; some limited exceptions apply. Players may hold more than one non-FIFA nationality.

No.	Pos.	Nation	Player
21	FW	ENG	Paul Brayson (at Cardiff City)

=== Left club during season ===
Note: Flags indicate national team as defined under FIFA eligibility rules; some limited exceptions apply. Players may hold more than one non-FIFA nationality.

No.	Pos.	Nation	Player
11	MF	SCO	Grant Brebner (to Hibernian)
13	GK	ENG	Nick Hammond (Retired)
16	MF	SCO	Andy McLaren
23	DF	NED	Elroy Kromheer (to 1. FC Nürnberg)
26	GK	AUS	Steve Mautone (to Wolverhampton Wanderers)

No.	Pos.	Nation	Player
28	DF	WAL	Mark Bowen (Retired)
28	FW	ENG	Mark Nicholls (loan return to Chelsea)
29	DF	ENG	Graham Potter (loan return to West Bromwich Albion)
30	FW	ENG	Kevin Lisbie (loan return to Charlton Athletic)
—	GK	ENG	Shaun Allaway (to Leeds United)

== Transfers ==
=== In ===
Date	Position	Nationality	Name	From	Fee	Ref.
22 June 1999	FW	(Scotland)	Nicky Forster	Birmingham City	£650,000	
17 August 1999	MF	(England)	Neil Smith	Fulham	£100,000	
20 August 1999	MF	(Scotland)	Peter Grant	Norwich City	Free	
7 October 1999	GK	(England)	Phil Whitehead	West Bromwich Albion	£250,000	
28 October 1999	DF	(England)	John Mackie	Sutton United	Undisclosed	
7 December 1999	DF	(Wales)	Mark Bowen	Wigan Athletic	Undisclosed	
28 January 2000	DF	(England)	Matthew Robinson	Portsmouth	£150,000	
1 February 2000	FW	(England)	Martin Butler	Cambridge United	£750,000	
23 March 2000	FW	(England)	Sammy Igoe	Portsmouth	£100,000	

=== Loan in ===
Date from	Position	Nationality	Name	From	Date to	Ref.
26 November 1999	FW	(England)	Kevin Lisbie	Charlton Athletic	26 December 1999	
3 December 1999	DF	(England)	Graham Potter	West Bromwich Albion	31 December 1999	
30 December 1999	FW	(England)	Mark Nicholls	Chelsea	10 February 2000	
1 February 2000	DF	(Wales)	Ady Williams	Wolverhampton Wanderers	End of season	
18 March 2000	DF	(England)	Ricky Newman	Millwall	End of Season	

=== Out ===
Date	Position	Nationality	Name	To	Fee	Ref.
12 July 1999	DF	(England)	Tony Barras	Walsall	Undisclosed	
6 August 1999	GK	(Australia)	Steve Mautone	Wolverhampton Wanderers	Undisclosed	
19 August 1999	MF	(Scotland)	Grant Brebner	Hibernian	Undisclosed	
5 March 2000	GK	(England)	Shaun Allaway	Leeds United	Undisclosed	

=== Loans out ===
Date from	Position	Nationality	Name	To	Date to	Ref.
17 March 2000	FW	(England)	Paul Brayson	Cardiff City	End of Season	

=== Released ===
Date	Position	Nationality	Name	Joined	Date	Ref.
July 1999	MF	(England)	Byron Glasgow	Crawley Town		
17 August 1999	DF	(Netherlands)	Elroy Kromheer	1. FC Nürnberg		
9 December 1999	DF	(Wales)	Mark Bowen	Retired		
February 2000	MF	(Scotland)	Andy McLaren	Kilmarnock	2 June 2000	
13 April 2000	GK	(England)	Nick Hammond	Retired		
30 June 2000	GK	(Netherlands)	Peter van der Kwaak	Go Ahead Eagles		
30 June 2000	DF	(Australia)	Andy Bernal	Retired		
30 June 2000	DF	(England)	Linvoy Primus	Portsmouth		
30 June 2000	MF	(England)	Adam Beasley			
30 June 2000	MF	(England)	Steve Osborne			
30 June 2000	MF	(Republic of Ireland)	Jim Crawford	Shelbourne		
30 June 2000	MF	(Scotland)	Peter Grant	Bournemouth		
30 June 2000	FW	(England)	Paul Brayson	Cardiff City	14 July 2000	
30 June 2000	FW	(England)	Martin Williams	Swindon Town	30 August 2000	
30 June 2000	FW	(Liberia)	Mass Sarr	Sydney Olympic		

== Competitions ==
=== Second Division ===
==== Results summary ====
Overall								Home						Away					
Pld	W	D	L	GF	GA	GD	Pts	W	D	L	GF	GA	GD	W	D	L	GF	GA	GD
46	16	14	16	57	63	−6	62	10	9	4	28	18	+10	6	5	12	29	45	−16

==== Results by round ====
Round	1	2	3	4	5	6	7	8	9	10	11	12	13	14	15	16	17	18	19	20	21	22	23	24	25	26	27	28	29	30	31	32	33	34	35	36	37	38	39	40	41	42	43	44	45	46
Ground	H	A	H	A	H	A	H	H	A	A	H	H	A	A	H	A	H	H	A	H	A	H	A	H	H	A	H	A	A	H	A	A	H	A	H	A	H	H	A	A	H	A	A	H	A	H
Result	W	L	L	L	D	L	W	D	L	L	L	W	W	D	L	L	D	D	L	D	L	D	D	D	D	L	W	D	W	W	D	L	W	W	W	L	W	L	W	W	D	W	L	W	D	W
Position	6	17	18	21	20	23	19	18	19	19	22	20	17	16	19	20	20	20	21	21	21	21	21	21	21	22	20	20	18	17	17	18	18	18	16	17	15	16	16	13	12	13	13	12	12	10

Source: Soccerbase; 11v11
A = Away; H = Home; W = Win; D = Draw; L = Loss

==== Results ====
7 August 1999 1	Reading	2–1	Bristol City	Reading
15:00 BST (UTC+1)	Brebner 15'; Crawford 85'; Gurney (yellow card)	Report	Lavin (red card) 27'; Tinnion 77'; Akinbiyi (yellow card)	Stadium: Madejski Stadium; Attendance: 13,348; Referee: G.Cain

14 August 1999 2	Cambridge United	3–1	Reading	Cambridge
15:00 BST (UTC+1)	Kyd 35'; Benjamin 59'; Duncan 68'; Eustace (yellow card); Chenery (yellow card); Butler (yellow card)	Report	McIntyre 82'; Polston (yellow card); Gurney (yellow card)	Stadium: Abbey Stadium; Attendance: 4,630; Referee: Steve Baines

21 August 1999 3	Reading	1–2	Luton Town	Reading
15:00 BST (UTC+1)	M.Williams 56'; Gurney (yellow card); Gray (yellow card)	Report	Fotiadis 54'; George 85'; Spring (yellow card); McLaren (yellow card)	Stadium: Madejski Stadium; Attendance: 8,741; Referee: Bennet

28 August 1999 4	Colchester United	3–2	Reading	Colchester
15:00 BST (UTC+1)	Aspinall 45', 88' (pen.); Duguid 78'	Report	Forster 22'; M.Williams 64'; Bernal (yellow card)	Stadium: Layer Road; Attendance: 3,443; Referee: Paul Rejer

1 September 1999 5	Reading	2–2	Preston North End	Reading
19:45 BST (UTC+1)	Smith 71'; Scott 79'; Casper (yellow card)	Report	Eyres 32'; Basham 39'	Stadium: Madejski Stadium; Attendance: 7,628; Referee: Paul Taylor

11 September 1999 6	Bournemouth	3–1	Reading	Bournemouth
15:00 BST (UTC+1)	Grant 22' (o.g.); Hughes 31'; Casper 43' (o.g.); Mean (yellow card)	Report	Caskey 9' (pen.); Hunter (yellow card) (yellow-red card) 76'; Casper (yellow card); Gurney (yellow card); Grant (yellow card); Scott (yellow card)	Stadium: Dean Court; Attendance: 6,007; Referee: Keith Hill

18 September 1999 7	Reading	1–0	Chesterfield	Reading
15:00 BST (UTC+1)	Caskey 58'; Grant (yellow card)	Report	Reeves (yellow card)	Stadium: Madejski Stadium; Attendance: 6,932; Referee: M.Fletcher

25 September 1999 8	Reading	1–1	Oldham Athletic	Reading
15:00 BST (UTC+1)	Polston 90'	Report	Allott 69'	Stadium: Madejski Stadium; Attendance: 7,274; Referee: Paul Robinson

2 October 1999 9	Wycombe Wanderers	5–3	Reading	High Wycombe
15:00 BST (UTC+1)	Ryan 8' (yellow card); Carroll 45'; Devine 52', 69', 83' (yellow card); Cousins (yellow card)	Report	Forster 58', 71'; Crawford (red card) 60'; Caskey 86' (pen.); Casper (yellow card); Bernal (yellow card); Parkinson (yellow card)	Stadium: Adams Park; Attendance: 7,042; Referee: C.R.Wilkes

9 October 1999 10	Stoke City	2–1	Reading	Stoke-on-Trent
15:00 BST (UTC+1)	Mohan 68'; Lightbourne (yellow card) (yellow-red card) 77'; Jacobsen 89'; Keen (yellow card)	Report	Forster 52'; M.Williams (yellow card)	Stadium: Britannia Stadium; Attendance: 9,621; Referee: T.Jones

16 October 1999 11	Reading	0–2	Wigan Athletic	Reading
15:00 BST (UTC+1)	Whitehead (yellow card); Bernal (yellow card); Parkinson (yellow card)	Report	Barlow 41' (yellow card); Bradshaw 90' (pen.)	Stadium: Madejski Stadium; Attendance: 7,708; Referee: Peter Walton

20 October 1999 12	Reading	2–0	Bury	Reading
19:45 BST (UTC+1)	Scott 41'; M.Williams 90'; Whitehead (yellow card); Hunter (yellow card); Parkinson (yellow card)	Report	Billy (yellow card)	Stadium: Madejski Stadium; Attendance: 5,393; Referee: M.D.Reed

23 October 1999 13	Oldham Athletic	1–2	Reading	Oldham
15:00 BST (UTC+1)	Dudley 20'; McNiven (yellow card); Hotte (yellow card); Whitehall (yellow card)	Report	Gurney 9'; Caskey 45' (pen.); Scott (yellow card)	Stadium: Boundary Park; Attendance: 4,963; Referee: Phil Joslin

2 November 1999 14	Brentford	1–1	Reading	Brentford
19:45 GMT (UTC)	Folan 74'; Evans (yellow card)	Report	Gurney 17'; Caskey (yellow card); McIntyre (yellow card)	Stadium: Griffin Park; Attendance: 6,774; Referee: Mark Warren

7 November 1999 15	Reading	1–2	Oxford United	Reading
11:00 GMT (UTC)	McIntyre 77'; Hunter (yellow card)	Report	Folland 7'; Murphy 84'; Whelan (yellow card); Lambert (yellow card); Lilley (yellow card)	Stadium: Madejski Stadium; Attendance: 10,101; Referee: Steve Dunn

16 November 1999 16	Millwall	5–0	Reading	Bermondsey
19:45 GMT (UTC)	Moody 8', 20', 54'; Harris 23', 69' (yellow card); Ryan (yellow card)	Report	Polston (yellow card); Hunter (yellow card); McIntyre (yellow card)	Stadium: The Den; Attendance: 5,202; Referee: Matt Messias

24 November 1999 17	Reading	0–0	Burnley	Reading
19:45 GMT (UTC)	Caskey (yellow card); McIntyre (yellow card)	Report	West (yellow card); Mullin (yellow card)	Stadium: Madejski Stadium; Attendance: 6,149; Referee: K.M.Lynch

27 November 1999 18	Reading	1–1	Scunthorpe United	Reading
15:00 GMT (UTC)	Hunter 88' (yellow card); Parkinson (yellow card)	Report	Hodges 72'; Logan (yellow card); Harsley (yellow card); Ipoua (yellow card); Graves (yellow card)	Stadium: Madejski Stadium; Attendance: 6,142; Referee: Rob Styles

4 December 1999 19	Bristol City	3–1	Reading	Bristol
15:00 GMT (UTC)	Torpey 45'; Taylor 50'; Beadle 76'; Millen (yellow card)	Report	Caskey 56' (yellow card); Gurney (yellow card); McIntyre (yellow card)	Stadium: Ashton Gate; Attendance: 8,936; Referee: Phil Dowd

18 December 1999 20	Reading	2–2	Wrexham	Reading
15:00 GMT (UTC)	Grant 39'; Scott 62'; Hunter (yellow card)	Report	Owen 45' (yellow card); Roberts 54' (yellow card); Ferguson (yellow card); Russell (yellow card)	Stadium: Madejski Stadium; Attendance: 6,223; Referee: Michael Ryan

26 December 1999 21	Cardiff City	1–0	Reading	Cardiff
12:15 GMT (UTC)	Nugent 75'; Carpenter (yellow card)	Report	Gurney (yellow card); Caskey (yellow card); M.Williams (yellow card)	Stadium: Ninian Park; Attendance: 9,791; Referee: Bill Jordan

28 December 1999 22	Reading	0–0	Notts County	Reading
15:00 GMT (UTC)		Report	Fenton (yellow card); Richardson (yellow card)	Stadium: Madejski Stadium; Attendance: 7,703; Referee: Mike Pike

3 January 2000 23	Gillingham	2–2	Reading	Gillingham
13:00 GMT (UTC)	Southall 20'; Thomson 90'	Report	Nicholls 87'; M.Williams 90' (pen.); Polston (yellow card); Gurney (yellow card)	Stadium: Priestfield Stadium; Attendance: 7,453; Referee: M.J.Brandwood

8 January 2000 24	Reading	1–1	Blackpool	Reading
15:00 GMT (UTC)	Caskey 66'	Report	Matthews 49'; Shuttleworth (red card) 56'; Hills (yellow card); Bushell (yellow card); Beesley (yellow card); Murphy (yellow card); Coid (yellow card)	Stadium: Madejski Stadium; Attendance: 7,297; Referee: Keith Hill

15 January 2000 25	Reading	0–0	Cambridge United	Reading
15:00 GMT (UTC)	Primus (yellow card)	Report		Stadium: Madejski Stadium; Attendance: 6,953; Referee: P.R.Richards

22 January 2000 26	Luton Town	3–1	Reading	Luton
15:00 GMT (UTC)	Watts 18'; George 69', 90'; McGowan (yellow card); Gray (yellow card)	Report	Caskey 60'; Primus (yellow card); Scott (yellow card)	Stadium: Kenilworth Road; Attendance: 6,044; Referee: Richard Beeby

29 January 2000 27	Reading	2–0	Colchester United	Reading
15:00 GMT (UTC)	Caskey 22', 78'; McIntyre (yellow card); Forster (yellow card)	Report	Wilkins (yellow card)	Stadium: Madejski Stadium; Attendance: 7,304; Referee: Barry Knight

5 February 2000 28	Preston North End	2–2	Reading	Preston
15:00 GMT (UTC)	Macken 53'; Jackson 56'; Gregan (yellow card)	Report	Forster 39'; Butler 60' (yellow card); Gurney (yellow card)	Stadium: Deepdale; Attendance: 12,618; Referee: Scott Mathieson

8 February 2000 29	Blackpool	0–2	Reading	Blackpool
19:45 GMT (UTC)	Murphy (yellow card)	Report	McIntyre 68'; Butler 80'	Stadium: Bloomfield Road; Attendance: 4,291; Referee: Ray Olivier

12 February 2000 30	Reading	2–0	Millwall	Reading
15:00 GMT (UTC)	Parkinson 65'; Forster 87'; Butler (yellow card); Bernal (yellow card)	Report	Nethercott (yellow card); Livermore (yellow card); Cahill (yellow card); Sadlier (yellow card); Moody (yellow card)	Stadium: Madejski Stadium; Attendance: 11,994; Referee: J.A.Kirkby

19 February 2000 31	Scunthorpe United	2–2	Reading	Scunthorpe
15:00 GMT (UTC)	Torpey 28' (yellow card); Quailey 40'; Housham (yellow card)	Report	Caskey 43' (pen.); McIntyre 56' (yellow card)	Stadium: Glanford Park; Attendance: 4,082; Referee: Chris Foy

26 February 2000 32	Chesterfield	2–0	Reading	Chesterfield
15:00 GMT (UTC)	Payne 41'; Breckin 71'	Report	Caskey (yellow card); Parkinson (yellow card); Hodges (yellow card)	Stadium: Saltergate; Attendance: 2,986; Referee: Peter Jones

4 March 2000 33	Reading	2–0	Bournemouth	Reading
15:00 GMT (UTC)	Caskey 3'; Forster 30'	Report	Elliott (yellow card)	Stadium: Madejski Stadium; Attendance: 10,551; Referee: William Burns

7 March 2000 34	Oxford United	1–3	Reading	Oxford
19:45 GMT (UTC)	Powell 8'; Tait (yellow card)	Report	Arendse 11' (o.g.); Hodges 32'; Caskey 61'; Butler (yellow card)	Stadium: Manor Ground; Attendance: 7,638; Referee: T.Jones

11 March 2000 35	Reading	1–0	Brentford	Reading
15:00 GMT (UTC)	A. Williams 80'; Forster (yellow card); Butler (yellow card)	Report	Ingimarsson (yellow card); Evans (yellow card)	Stadium: Madejski Stadium; Attendance: 11,427; Referee: A.N.Butler

18 March 2000 36	Burnley	3–0	Reading	Burnley
15:00 GMT (UTC)	Davis 37'; Payton 52'; Wright 84'	Report		Stadium: Turf Moor; Attendance: 14,436; Referee: R.D.Furnandiz

22 March 2000 37	Reading	2–0	Bristol Rovers	Reading
19:45 GMT (UTC)	Forster 24' (yellow card); Caskey 70'; Smith (yellow card)	Report	Challis (yellow card); Pethick (yellow card); Thomson (yellow card); Astafjevs (yellow card); Hillier (yellow card); Roberts (yellow card)	Stadium: Madejski Stadium; Attendance: 11,707; Referee: Eddie Wolstenholme

25 March 2000 38	Reading	0–1	Cardiff City	Reading
15:00 GMT (UTC)	Caskey (yellow card); Newman (yellow card); Hunter (yellow card)	Report	Bowen 58'	Stadium: Madejski Stadium; Attendance: 10,044; Referee: Trevor Parkes

1 April 2000 39	Wrexham	0–1	Reading	Wrexham
15:00 BST (UTC+1)	Hardy (yellow card); Roberts (yellow card)	Report	Butler 7'; Robinson (yellow card); Grant (yellow card); Forster (yellow card)	Stadium: Racecourse Ground; Attendance: 2,613; Referee: Mike Pike

4 April 2000 40	Bristol Rovers	0–1	Reading	Bristol
19:45 BST (UTC+1)	Walters (yellow card); Hunter (yellow card); Robinson (yellow card); Caskey (yellow card); Grant (yellow card)	Report	Caskey 65'	Stadium: Memorial Ground; Attendance: 7,771; Referee: Paul Durkin

7 April 2000 41	Reading	2–2	Gillingham	Reading
19:45 BST (UTC+1)	Butler 43'; Caskey 75'; Grant (yellow card); Williams (yellow card)	Report	Southall 49'; Onuora 65'	Stadium: Madejski Stadium; Attendance: 11,064; Referee: Richard Beeby

15 April 2000 42	Notts County	1–2	Reading	Nottingham
15:06 BST (UTC+1)	Darby 58'	Report	Forster 46'; Newman 60'	Stadium: Meadow Lane; Attendance: 4,791; Referee: R.Pearson

22 April 2000 43	Wigan Athletic	1–0	Reading	Wigan
15:00 BST (UTC+1)	Redfearn 34' (pen.); Nicholls (yellow card); Péron (yellow card); Haworth (yellow card)	Report	Primus (yellow card); A. Williams (yellow card); Grant (yellow card)	Stadium: JJB Stadium; Attendance: 5,855; Referee: David Laws

24 April 2000 44	Reading	2–1	Wycombe Wanderers	Reading
15:00 BST (UTC+1)	Grant (yellow card) 44' (yellow-red card); Forster 55'; M.Williams 71'; Henderson (yellow card); Butler (yellow card)	Report	McSporran 64'; McCarthy (yellow card)	Stadium: Madejski Stadium; Attendance: 11,834; Referee: P.R.Richards

29 April 2000 45	Bury	1–1	Reading	Bury
15:00 BST (UTC+1)	Preece 89'	Report	Caskey 43'; Murty (yellow card); Igoe (yellow card)	Stadium: Gigg Lane; Attendance: 3,869; Referee: Trevor Parkes

6 May 2000 46	Reading	1–0	Stoke City	Reading
15:00 BST (UTC+1)	Caskey 81' (pen.) (yellow card)	Report	Clarke (yellow card); Mohan (yellow card); Kavanagh (yellow card); Gunnarsson (yellow card)	Stadium: Madejski Stadium; Attendance: 13,146; Referee: Paul Robinson

==== League table ====
Pos	Team	Pld	W	D	L	GF	GA	GD	Pts
8	Notts County	46	18	11	17	61	55	+6	65
9	Bristol City	46	15	19	12	59	57	+2	64
10	Reading	46	16	14	16	57	63	−6	62
11	Wrexham	46	17	11	18	52	61	−9	62
12	Wycombe Wanderers	46	16	13	17	56	53	+3	61

Rules for classification: 1) Points; 2) Goal difference; 3) Goals scored

=== FA Cup ===
30 October 1999 First Round	Reading	4–2	Yeovil Town	Reading
15:00 GMT (UTC)	Bernal 31'; Caskey 63' (pen.); Hunter 80' (yellow card); M.Williams 87'; Scott (yellow card)	Report	Foster 36' (yellow card); Eaton 90'; C.Sparks (yellow card)	Stadium: Madejski Stadium; Attendance: 8,032; Referee: Bill Jordan

20 November 1999 Second round	Reading	1–1	Halifax Town	Reading
15:00 GMT (UTC)	Parkinson (yellow card) (yellow-red card) 39'; Caskey 75' (pen.); Bernal (yellow card); Hunter (yellow card)	Report	Mitchell 60'; Wilder (yellow card); R.Lucas (yellow card)	Stadium: Madejski Stadium; Attendance: 5,918; Referee: Richard Beeby

30 November 1999 Second round replay	Halifax Town	0–1	Reading	Halifax
19:45 GMT (UTC)	Wilder (yellow card); Paterson (yellow card)	Report	Caskey 64' (pen.); Polston (red card) 90'; Parkinson (yellow card)	Stadium: The Shay; Attendance: 2,156; Referee: Richard Beeby

1 December 1999 Third round	Reading	1–1	Plymouth Argyle	Reading
15:00 GMT (UTC)	McIntyre 37'; Evers (yellow card); Parkinson (yellow card)	Report	Hargreaves 82' (yellow card)	Stadium: Madejski Stadium; Attendance: 8,536; Referee: Alan Wiley

21 December 1999 Third round replay	Plymouth Argyle	1–0	Reading	Plymouth
19:45 GMT (UTC)	Heathcote 88'; Beswetherick (yellow card); Leadbitter (yellow card)	Report	Smith (yellow card) (yellow-red card) 39'	Stadium: Home Park; Attendance: 8,965; Referee: Alan Wiley

=== League Cup ===
11 August 1999 First Round 1st leg	Reading	0–0	Peterborough United	Reading
BST (UTC+1)	Hunter (yellow card)	Report	Hooper (yellow card)	Stadium: Madejski Stadium; Attendance: 4,651; Referee: A.R.Hall

24 August 1999 First Round 2nd leg	Peterborough United	1–2 (1–2 agg.)	Reading	Peterborough
BST (UTC+1)	Shields 20'	Report	Caskey 18'; Scott 71'	Stadium: London Road; Attendance: 4,109; Referee: R.D.Furnandiz

14 September 1999 Second Round 1st leg	Bradford City	1–1	Reading	Bradford
BST (UTC+1)	Blake 43' (pen.)	Report	Caskey 67' (pen.)	Stadium: Valley Parade; Attendance: 4,961; Referee: Terry Heilbron

22 September 1999 Second Round 2nd leg	Reading	2–2 (a.e.t.) (3–3 (a) agg.)	Bradford City	Reading
BST (UTC+1)	Scott 9'; Hunter 98'; Gurney (yellow card); Smith (yellow card); Gray (yellow card)	Report	Saunders 73'; Wetherall 108'; Wright (yellow card); Myers (yellow card); Windass (yellow card)	Stadium: Madejski Stadium; Attendance: 6,892; Referee: Paul Danson

=== League Trophy South ===
8 December 1999 First Round	Reading	1–0	Leyton Orient	Reading
GMT (UTC)	Bernal 21'	Report	McGhee (yellow card)	Stadium: Madejski Stadium; Attendance: 1,561; Referee: Steve Tomlin

18 January 2000 Second Round	Barnet	1–2 (a.e.t.)	Reading	Chipping Barnet
GMT (UTC)	Hackett 54'	Report	Caskey 21'; Scott 94'	Stadium: Underhill Stadium; Attendance: 1,109; Referee: M.Fletcher

24 January 2000 Quarter Final	Bristol Rovers	1–2	Reading	Bristol
GMT (UTC)	Cureton 54' (pen.)	Report	Nicholls 11', 30'	Stadium: Memorial Stadium; Attendance: 4,948; Referee: Mike Jones

15 February 2000 Semi Final	Bristol City	4–0	Reading	Bristol
GMT (UTC)	Beadle 35'; Thorpe 39', 68'; Murray 70'; Millen (yellow card)	Report	McIntyre (yellow card)	Stadium: Ashton Gate; Attendance: 8,733; Referee: K.A.Leach

== Squad statistics ==
As of match played 6 May 2000

=== Appearances and goals ===
No.	Pos	Nat	Player	Total		Second Division		FA Cup		League Cup		League Trophy	
No.	Pos	Nat	Player	Apps	Goals	Apps	Goals	Apps	Goals	Apps	Goals	Apps	Goals
1	GK	(Scotland) SCO	Scott Howie	47	0	35+1	0	3	0	4	0	4	0
2	DF	(England) ENG	John Polston	20	1	12+2	1	4	0	1	0	1	0
3	DF	(Scotland) SCO	Stuart Gray	21	0	12+3	0	0+1	0	4	0	1	0
4	MF	(England) ENG	Phil Parkinson	29	1	22	1	5	0	0	0	2	0
5	DF	(England) ENG	Linvoy Primus	35	0	27+1	0	4	0	0	0	3	0
6	DF	(Northern Ireland) NIR	Barry Hunter	39	3	27+4	1	2	1	3	1	3	0
7	DF	(England) ENG	Chris Casper	20	0	14+1	0	2	0	3	0	0	0
8	MF	(England) ENG	Darren Caskey	57	23	43+1	17	5	3	4	2	4	1
9	FW	(Scotland) SCO	Jim McIntyre	34	5	15+11	4	2+2	1	1+1	0	1+1	0
10	FW	(England) ENG	Nicky Forster	44	10	31+5	10	2	0	3	0	2+1	0
11	MF	(Scotland) SCO	Peter Grant	38	1	27+2	1	0+4	0	3	0	2	0
12	FW	(England) ENG	Keith Scott	34	6	14+11	3	2+1	0	2+1	2	1+2	1
14	DF	(England) ENG	Graeme Murty	24	0	14+3	0	4+1	0	0	0	0+2	0
15	MF	(England) ENG	Sean Evers	25	0	8+9	0	4	0	0+1	0	2+1	0
16	DF	(England) ENG	Matthew Robinson	20	0	19	0	0	0	0	0	1	0
17	FW	(England) ENG	Martin Williams	39	6	22+7	5	4+1	1	2+1	0	2	0
18	DF	(England) ENG	Andy Gurney	49	2	35+3	2	5	0	3	0	3	0
19	MF	(Republic of Ireland) IRL	Jim Crawford	8	1	3+1	1	0	0	1+2	0	0+1	0
20	DF	(Australia) AUS	Andy Bernal	34	2	19+4	0	4	1	3+1	0	3	1
22	MF	(England) ENG	Lee Hodges	29	1	15+10	1	0	0	1+2	0	0+1	0
24	FW	(Liberia) LBR	Mass Sarr	6	0	0+3	0	0+1	0	0	0	0+2	0
25	GK	(Netherlands) NED	Peter van der Kwaak	1	0	0+1	0	0	0	0	0	0	0
26	MF	(England) ENG	Neil Smith	43	1	26+10	1	1	0	3	0	2+1	0
27	GK	(England) ENG	Phil Whitehead	13	0	11	0	2	0	0	0	0	0
28	DF	(England) ENG	Ricky Newman	7	1	4+3	1	0	0	0	0	0	0
29	DF	(Wales) WAL	Ady Williams	16	1	15	1	0	0	0	0	1	0
30	FW	(England) ENG	Martin Butler	18	4	17	4	0	0	0	0	1	0
34	MF	(England) ENG	Alex Haddow	3	0	1+1	0	0	0	1	0	0	0
38	FW	(England) ENG	Nathan Tyson	1	0	0+1	0	0	0	0	0	0	0
39	FW	(England) ENG	Darius Henderson	6	0	2+4	0	0	0	0	0	0	0
41	MF	(England) ENG	Sammy Igoe	6	0	3+3	0	0	0	0	0	0	0
Players away on loan:
21	FW	(England) ENG	Paul Brayson	10	0	0+7	0	0+1	0	0+1	0	1	0
Players who appeared for Reading but left during the season:
11	MF	(Scotland) SCO	Grant Brebner	3	1	2	1	0	0	1	0	0	0
16	MF	(Scotland) SCO	Andy McLaren	4	0	2	0	0	0	1+1	0	0	0
28	DF	(Wales) WAL	Mark Bowen	1	0	0	0	0	0	0	0	1	0
28	FW	(England) ENG	Mark Nicholls	7	3	4+1	1	0	0	0	0	2	2
29	DF	(England) ENG	Graham Potter	5	0	4	0	0	0	0	0	1	0
30	FW	(Jamaica) JAM	Kevin Lisbie	2	0	1+1	0	0	0	0	0	0	0

=== Goal scorers ===
Place	Position	Nation	Number	Name	Division Two	FA Cup	League Cup	League Trophy	Total
1	MF	(England)	8	Darren Caskey	17	3	2	1	23
2	FW	(England)	10	Nicky Forster	10	0	0	0	10
3	FW	(England)	17	Martin Williams	5	1	0	0	6
3	FW	(England)	12	Keith Scott	3	0	2	1	6
5	FW	(Scotland)	9	Jim McIntyre	4	1	0	0	5
6	FW	(England)	30	Martin Butler	4	0	0	0	4
7	DF	(Northern Ireland)	6	Barry Hunter	1	1	1	0	3
7	FW	(England)	28	Mark Nicholls	1	0	0	2	3
9	DF	(England)	18	Andy Gurney	2	0	0	0	2
9	DF	(Australia)	20	Andy Bernal	0	1	0	1	2
11	MF	(Scotland)	11	Grant Brebner	1	0	0	0	1
11	MF	(Republic of Ireland)	19	Jim Crawford	1	0	0	0	1
11	MF	(Scotland)	11	Peter Grant	1	0	0	0	1
11	MF	(England)	22	Lee Hodges	1	0	0	0	1
11	MF	(England)	4	Phil Parkinson	1	0	0	0	1
11	DF	(England)	2	John Polston	1	0	0	0	1
11	MF	(England)	26	Neil Smith	1	0	0	0	1
11	DF	(Wales)	29	Ady Williams	1	0	0	0	1
11				Own goal	1	0	0	0	1
TOTALS					57	7	5	5	74

=== Clean sheets ===
Place	Position	Nation	Number	Name	Division Two	FA Cup	League Cup	League Trophy	Total
1	GK	(Scotland)	1	Scott Howie	11	1	1	1	14
2	GK	(England)	27	Phil Whitehead	3	0	0	0	3
TOTALS					14	1	1	1	17

=== Disciplinary record ===
Number	Nation	Position	Name	Division Two		FA Cup		League Cup		League Trophy		Total	
Number	Nation	Position	Name	Booked	Sent off (straight red)	Booked	Sent off (straight red)	Booked	Sent off (straight red)	Booked	Sent off (straight red)	Booked	Sent off (straight red)
2	(England)	DF	John Polston	3	0	0	1	0	0	0	0	3	1
3	(Scotland)	MF	Stuart Gray	1	0	0	0	1	0	0	0	2	0
4	(England)	MF	Phil Parkinson	5	0	4	1	0	0	0	0	9	1
5	(England)	DF	Linvoy Primus	3	0	0	0	0	0	0	0	3	0
6	(Northern Ireland)	DF	Barry Hunter	9	1	2	0	1	0	0	0	12	1
7	(England)	DF	Chris Casper	3	0	0	0	0	0	0	0	3	0
8	(England)	MF	Darren Caskey	8	0	0	0	0	0	0	0	8	0
9	(Scotland)	FW	Jim McIntyre	6	0	0	0	0	0	1	0	7	0
10	(England)	FW	Nicky Forster	4	0	0	0	0	0	0	0	4	0
11	(Scotland)	MF	Peter Grant	8	1	0	0	0	0	0	0	8	1
12	(England)	FW	Keith Scott	3	0	1	0	0	0	0	0	4	0
14	(England)	DF	Graeme Murty	1	0	0	0	0	0	0	0	1	0
15	(England)	MF	Sean Evers	0	0	1	0	0	0	0	0	1	0
16	(England)	MF	Matthew Robinson	2	0	0	0	0	0	0	0	2	0
17	(England)	FW	Martin Williams	3	0	0	0	0	0	0	0	3	0
18	(England)	DF	Andy Gurney	8	0	0	0	1	0	0	0	9	0
19	(Republic of Ireland)	MF	Jim Crawford	2	1	0	0	0	0	0	0	2	1
20	(Australia)	DF	Andy Bernal	4	0	1	0	0	0	0	0	5	0
22	(England)	MF	Lee Hodges	1	0	0	0	0	0	0	0	1	0
26	(England)	MF	Neil Smith	1	0	2	1	1	0	0	0	4	1
27	(England)	GK	Phil Whitehead	2	0	0	0	0	0	0	0	2	0
28	(England)	DF	Ricky Newman	1	0	0	0	0	0	0	0	1	0
29	(Wales)	DF	Ady Williams	1	0	0	0	0	0	0	0	1	0
30	(England)	FW	Martin Butler	5	0	0	0	0	0	0	0	5	0
39	(England)	FW	Darius Henderson	1	0	0	0	0	0	0	0	1	0
41	(England)	FW	Sammy Igoe	1	0	0	0	0	0	0	0	1	0
Players away on loan:
Players who left Reading during the season:
Total				86	3	11	3	4	0	1	0	102	6
