= Polston =

Polston is a surname. Notable people with the surname include:

- Andy Polston (born 1970), English footballer
- John Polston (born 1968), English footballer
- Ricky Polston (born 1956), American judge from Florida

== See also ==
- Polsten, make of gun
