= Madejski Stadium =

Sports stadium in Reading, Berkshire, England

Select Car Leasing Stadium
- The Mad Stad
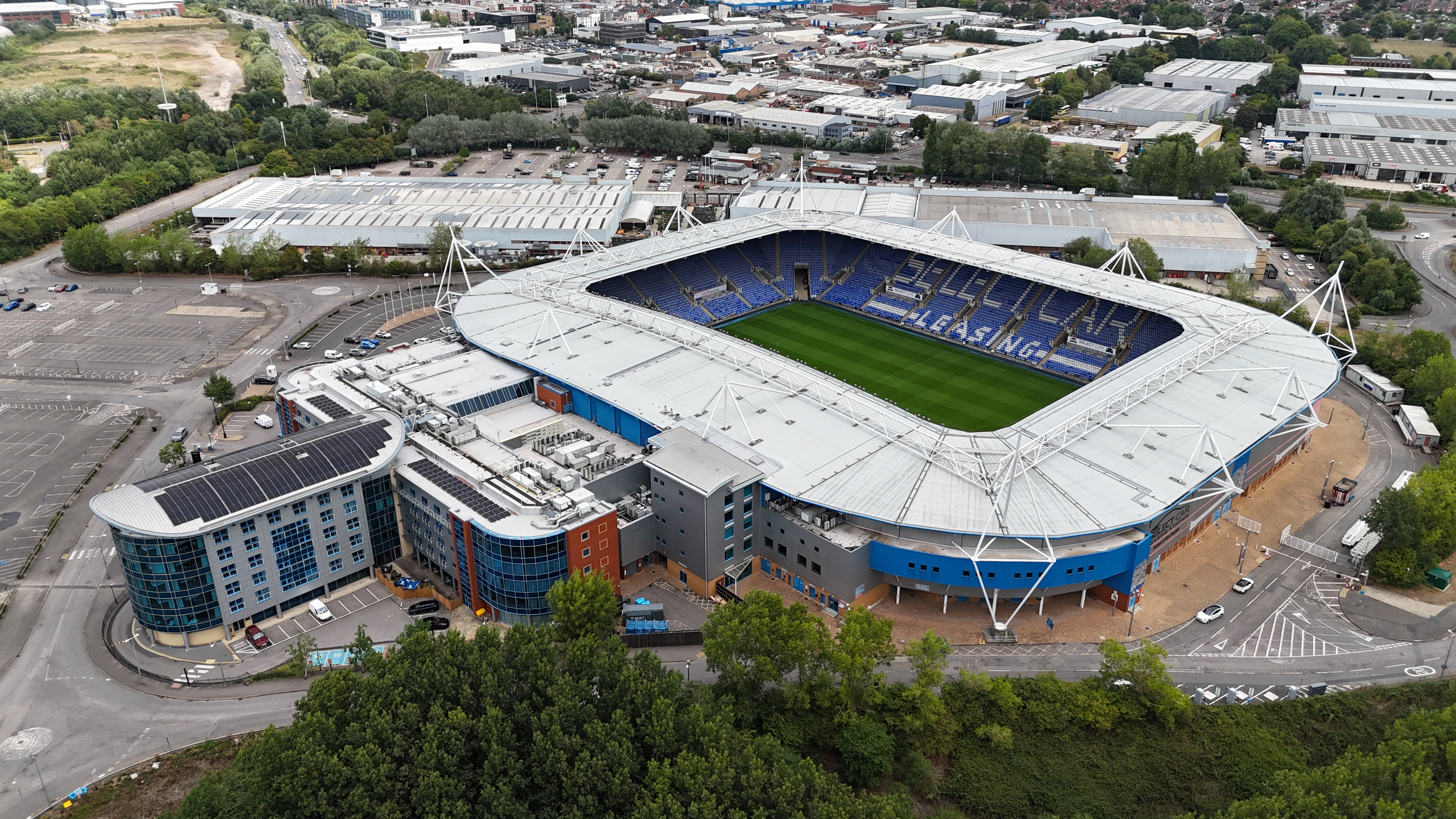
- Aerial view of the stadium in 2025
- Interactive map of Select Car Leasing Stadium
- Full name: Select Car Leasing Stadium
- Location: Junction 11; M4; Reading; Berkshire; RG2 0FL
- Coordinates: 51°25′20″N 0°58′58″W
- Owner: Redwood Holdings
- Operator: Reading F.C.
- Capacity: 24,161
- Surface: SIS Grass
- Record attendance: 24,184 (Reading v. Everton; 17 November 2012); 23,709 (London Irish v. London Wasps; 16 March 2008)
- Field size: 105m x 68m (football)
- Public transit: Reading Green Park (1.5 km (0.9 mi))

Construction
- Opened: 22 August 1998
- Cost: £50m (£97m in 2025)

Tenants
- Football; Reading (1998–present); Reading Women (2020–present); Rugby Union; London Irish (2000–2020); Richmond (1998–1999)

The Madejski Stadium (/məˈdeɪski/), currently known as the Select Car Leasing Stadium for sponsorship reasons, is a football stadium in Reading, Berkshire, England. It is the home of Reading Football Club, who play in EFL League One. It also provides the finish for the Reading Half Marathon. It is an all-seater bowl stadium with a capacity of 24,161 and is located close to the M4 motorway and Reading Green Park railway station. The West Stand contains the Voco Reading Hotel.

The stadium was opened on 22 August 1998 and replaced Elm Park as Reading's home ground. It was named after John Madejski, who was chairman of Reading FC and provided most of the funding.

== History ==
In January 1990, the Taylor Report made all-seater stadiums compulsory in the top two divisions of English football for the 1994–95 season. Having played in the second tier of the English league several times before, Reading were champions of Division Two in 1994, and were promoted to Division One. Reading became subject to the Taylor requirements. Converting Elm Park to an all-seater stadium was not practical, so a location in Smallmead (to the south of the town) was identified as the site for a new stadium. The location of a closed landfill, the site was purchased for £1, on the condition that the club develop the A33 relief road. Construction of the new stadium, which was undertaken by Birse Group, was underway by 1997, and the last competitive match at Elm Park took place on 3 May 1998 against Norwich City, with Reading losing 1–0, having already been relegated to Division Two.

Reading began the 1998–99 season at the Madejski Stadium. It was opened on 22 August 1998 when Reading beat Luton Town 3–0, with Grant Brebner scoring the first goal at the stadium. Following the death of academy manager Eamonn Dolan in 2016, the North Stand was renamed as a memorial to him.

For the first time in its history, Reading Football Club participated in the Premier League in the 2006–07 season. As a result of the sell-out crowds for their first few fixtures of the season, the club announced its intention, in October 2006, to make a planning application to extend the ground to between 37,000 and 38,000 seats. The application was made on 24 January 2007, proposing initially the extension of the East Stand with a further 6,000 seats (raising capacity to around 30,000) and subsequently extension of the North and South Stands to reach the full proposed capacity.

On 24 May 2007, it was announced that planning permission had been granted to extend the stadium to a capacity of 36,900. The first phase will expand the East Stand by 6,600 seats. Work was set to start in mid-2008, after the initial plan of extending in 2007 was scrapped due to spectator seats being affected, during the work, already being sold to season ticket holders.

Reading's relegation from the Premier League in 2008 meant that all expansion plans were put on hold, but were revived when promotion was again achieved in 2012.

Plans to expand the ground were again put on hold after Reading were relegated back to the Football League Championship at the end of the 2012–13 season after a goalless draw at home to QPR on 28 April 2013.

In July 2021, at the beginning of the 150th anniversary season, it was announced that the Madejski Stadium had been rebranded as the Select Car Leasing Stadium for the next ten years, under a sponsorship agreement . In honour of Sir John Madejski, the East Stand was renamed as The Sir John Madejski Stand.

== Structure and facilities ==
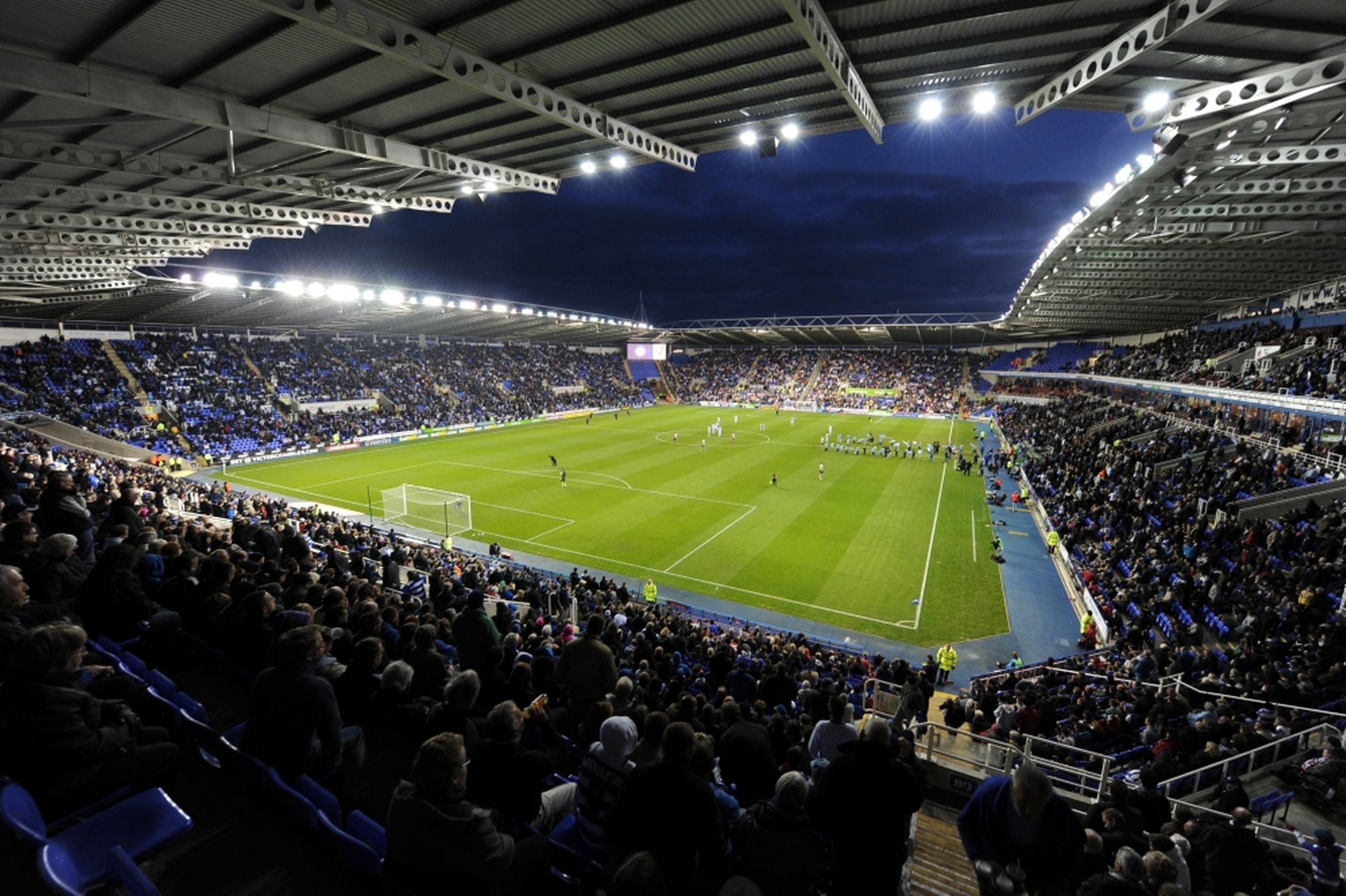
The Madejski Stadium as viewed from the stadium's north stand.

The stadium cost more than £50m to build and the pitch incorporates a system of synthetic fibres interwoven with natural grass, installed at a cost of more than £750,000. It is built on the site of a landfill site and is surrounded by methane vents.

The Eamonn Dolan Stand capacity is 4,946 including 25 spaces for wheelchairs. Although in use for all Reading matches, the stand was normally closed for London Irish and only opened in exceptional circumstances where demand required.

The South Stand has a capacity of 4,350 including 29 wheelchair spaces and contains an area for visiting supporters. The initial allocation visiting teams received up until the 2022–23 season was 2,127 and is the half of the stand joining onto the West Stand. The other half of the South Stand is Club 1871, a home fans member area, which encourages safe standing to create a matchday atmosphere. Under the terms of their original lease, London Irish only utilised the South Stand for the most popular matches. However, with the original renegotiation and extension of the lease, the South Stand was used for all London Irish matches with an unreserved seating plan. London Irish sold season tickets for South Stand between 2008 and 2014–15. Since 2015, with falling attendance at London Irish, the South Stand remained closed for rugby and only opened if required.

The Sir John Madejski Stand (East) has a capacity of 7,286 including 18 spaces for wheelchairs. The stand also contains the stadium's video screen which is located in the corner adjoining the South Stand. The stand was open for all London Irish fixtures only until the end of the 2015–16 season and again for the 2017–18 and 2019–20 seasons.

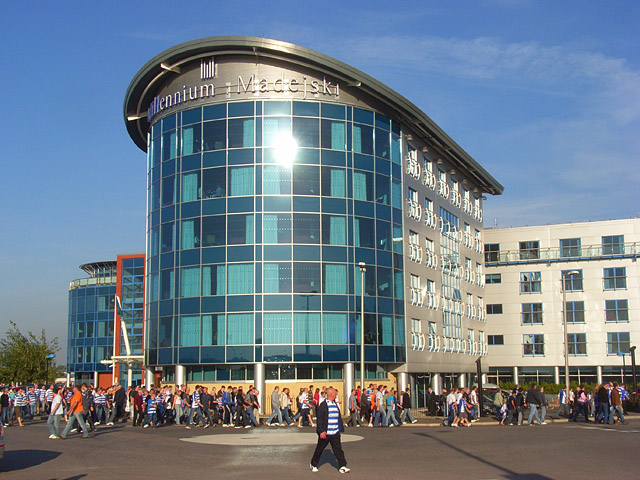
The Voco Reading Hotel, pictured when still known as the Millennium Madejski

The West Stand, the stadium's main stand, has a capacity of 7,579 including 15 wheelchair spaces and contains a lower and an upper tier. The upper level does not overhang the lower tier and the executive boxes are located between the two tiers. The tunnel and dugouts are located in this stand. During the 2016–17 and 2018–19 seasons, the West Stand was the only stand in regular use for London Irish home games. The outside of the stand contains the Voco Reading hotel, part of InterContinental Hotels Group's Voco chain. From the 2023–24 season the initial allocation for visiting fans will be located in the upper west corner.

== International football ==
The stadium has hosted eight international matches, including five England under-21 internationals and an England B team match.

Date	Home	Score	Away	Attendance	Competition
3 September 1999	England under-21	5–0	Luxembourg	18,094	2000 UEFA European Under-21 Championship qualification Group 5
14 August 2001	England under-21	4–0	Netherlands	19,467	International friendly
15 October 2002	England under-21	3–1	Macedonia	15,500	2004 UEFA European Under-21 Championship qualification Group 7
7 September 2003	Australia	2–1	Jamaica	8,050	International friendly
28 February 2006	England under-21	2–2	Norway	15,022	International friendly
25 May 2006	England	1–2	Belarus	22,032	International friendly
5 September 2013	England under-21	1–0	Moldova	5,268	2015 UEFA European Under-21 Championship qualification Group 1
7 September 2013	(England) Reading	0–2	Oman		Club v country friendly

== Rugby union ==
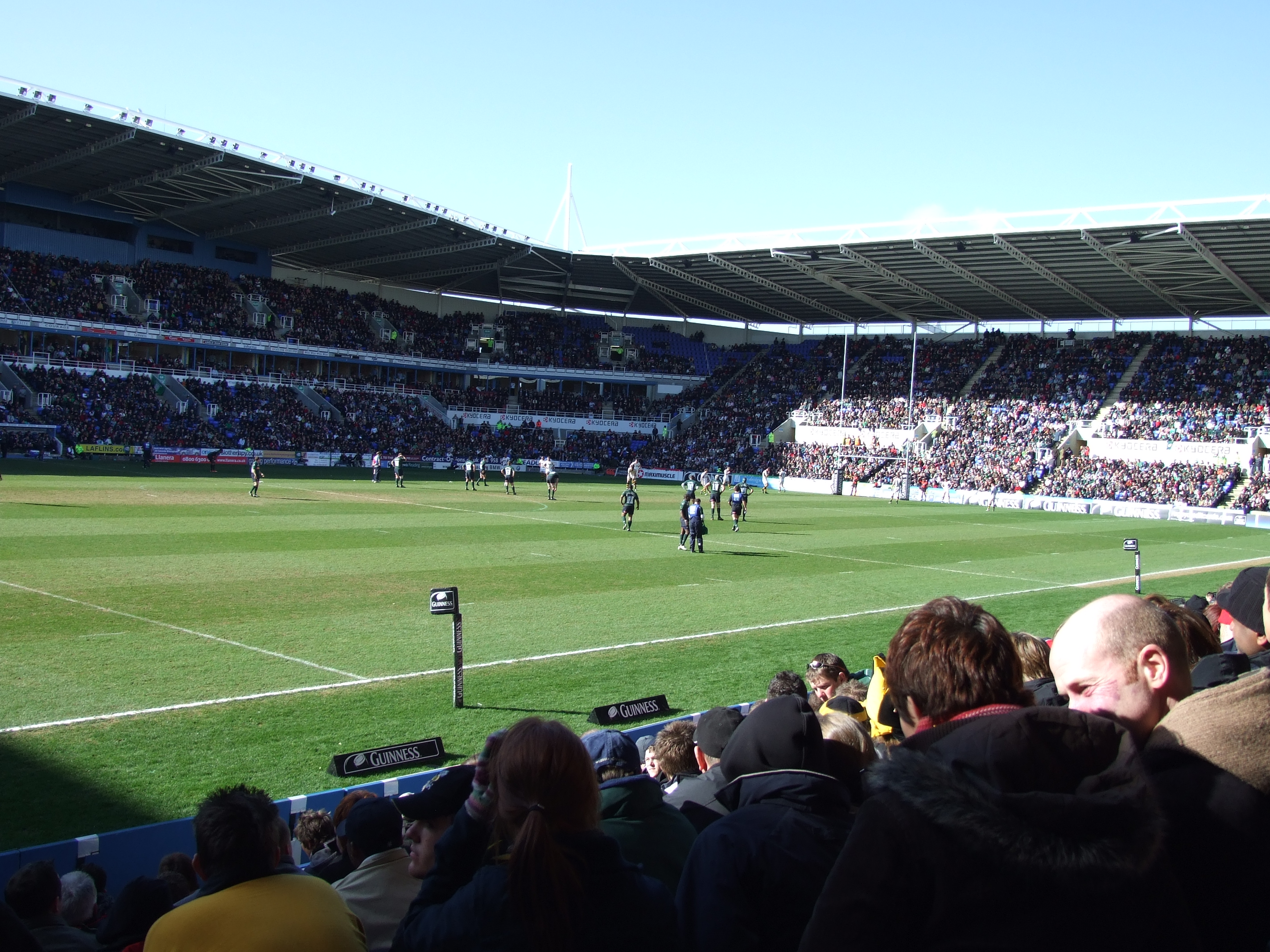
London Irish playing London Wasps in August 2011

Although a designated football stadium, the stadium was used regularly since opening for rugby union. Richmond were the first rugby team to become Reading's tenants, using the stadium from its opening season in 1998 after outgrowing their original home of Richmond Athletic Ground. This tenancy lasted only one season as Richmond went into administration and were nominally merged into London Irish.

London Irish moved into the stadium in 2000 after a year of ground sharing with Harlequins at the Stoop Memorial Ground in Twickenham. On 11 January 2008, it was announced that London Irish had reached an agreement to continue playing home games at the stadium until 2026. However, they were to leave after the 2019–20 season. London Irish played their last game at the stadium on 1 March 2020 when they were defeated by Wasps. The COVID-19 pandemic had disrupted the season causing a premature end to their tenancy and forcing them to return to the Stoop for the remainder of the elongated season.

Irish saw their average crowds grow to more than 11,100 after moving to Reading in 2000, holding the record for the biggest rugby union Premiership attendance at a club ground, when 23,709 people saw Irish play Wasps (then London Wasps) on 16 March 2008. This record stood until 19 September 2009, when Leicester Tigers opened their new stand to increase capacity to 24,000.

In addition to London Irish home matches, the stadium has also hosted several knock out phases of European cup rugby where a neutral ground was required or where teams were required to play at a larger capacity ground.

Date	Home	Score	Away	Attendance	Competition
20 May 2000	(England) NEC Harlequins	42–33	(France) Narbonne	11,211	2000–01 European Challenge Cup final
25 May 2003	(England) Bath	30–48	(England) London Wasps	18,074	2002–03 Parker Pen Challenge Cup final
22 May 2004	(France) Montferrand	26–27	(England) NEC Harlequins	13,123	2003–04 Parker Pen Challenge Cup final
23 April 2016	(England) Saracens	24–17	(England) Wasps	16,820	2015–16 European Champions Cup semi-final

== Music ==
Besides football, the Madejski Stadium can be configured to hold other events, including concerts.

On 13 June 2004, Busted played at the Madejski Stadium, with an attendance of 20,000.

On 26 May 2005, Elton John played at the Madejski Stadium in front of a crowd of 24,000. Reading FC supporters were given priority, with tickets going on sale on the 9 December 2004 ahead of the general sale on 14 December. This was followed by XS Madness on 6 June, attended by 9,000. The event featured multiple performers including McFly, Rachel Stevens, Charlotte Church, Bananarama and Melanie C.

Luciano Pavarotti was due to perform the stadium on 1 July 2006, after being delayed from the 11 June due the singer's neck surgery to repair two vertebrae. His final public performance was at opening ceremony of the 2006 Winter Olympics in Turin, before his death in 2007 from pancreatic cancer. He underwent surgery in early July 2006, with all his remaining concerts being cancelled.

On 3 July 2006, the Red Hot Chili Peppers played the Madejski Stadium as part of their Stadium Arcadium World Tour, with a crowd of 28,000 turning up for the event.

On 1 June 2013, the AllStarz Summer Party was held. JLS performed, with the headliner being Jessie J.

== Other uses ==
The Madejski was selected as the venue for a charity friendly football match on 3 May 2006, featuring celebrities and football legends from England and Germany. The Match, named England vs Germany: The Legends was held to raise money for the Bobby Moore Fund and the British Red Cross and to celebrate the fortieth anniversary of England winning the 1966 World Cup. The German team won the match 4–2, in an exact reversal of the score from 1966, in front of a crowd of 20,000.

The stadium is also the final venue for the Reading Senior Cup.

Runners finishing the Reading Half Marathon cross the finish line inside the stadium. The stadium is also used as a hub for pre- and post-event services e.g. public transport terminus and bag drop during the day of the event.

A match from the 2000 Rugby League World Cup was also held here.

Year	Date	Team 1	Score	Team 2	Attendance	Part of
2000	2 November	New Zealand	84–10	Cook Islands	3,982	2000 Rugby League World Cup Group 2

From February 2021 onwards, the stadium was used by the NHS as a mass vaccination centre as part of the nationwide vaccine rollout, at the height of the COVID-19 pandemic.

== Records ==
The highest attendance at the stadium was 24,184 (apparently exceeding the stadium's stated capacity) on 17 November 2012 for the Premier League game with Everton beating the previous record of 24,160 set on 16 September 2012 for the Premier League game with Tottenham Hotspur. The highest attendance for a cup match at the stadium was 24,107 on 3 December 2003 for the Football League Cup match with Chelsea.

=== Highest attendances ===
	Opponent	Competition	Date	Attendance	Notes
1	Everton	2012–13 Premier League	17 November 2012	24,184	Stadium's stated capacity at the time was 24,242
2	West Ham United	2012–13 Premier League	29 December 2012	24,183	Stadium's stated capacity at the time was 24,242
3	Tottenham Hotspur	2012–13 Premier League	16 September 2012	24,160	
4	Manchester United	2007–08 Premier League	19 January 2008	24,134	
5	Tottenham Hotspur	2007–08 Premier League	3 May 2008	24,125	
6	Aston Villa	2006–07 Premier League	10 February 2007	24,122	
7	Liverpool	2006–07 Premier League	7 April 2007	24,121	
8	Newcastle United	2007–08 Premier League	27 October 2007	24,119	
9	Fulham	2007–08 Premier League	12 April 2008	24,112	
10	Tottenham Hotspur	2006–07 Premier League	12 November 2006	24,110	
11	Newcastle United	2006–07 Premier League	30 April 2007	24,109	
12	Chelsea	2003–04 Football League Cup	3 December 2003	24,107	

=== Attendances by season ===
Season	Reading						Richmond					
Season	Average attendance (Note: The average attendance figure includes league matches only.)		Highest attendance				Average attendance (Note: Since 2004, London Irish have played a Premiership home match at Twickenham Stadium, London as part of the London Double Header. These matches are removed from the highest and average attendance figures to show only the highest and average attendances at the Madejski Stadium.)		Highest attendance			
Season	Division	Ave.	Date	Opponent	Competition	Att.	Division	Ave.	Date	Opponent	Competition	Att.
1998–99	Division Two	11,262 (▲16%)	27 March	Manchester City	Division Two	20,055	Premiership	7,205 (▲)	26 December	London Irish	Premiership	9,621
1999–2000	Division Two	8,985 (▼20%)	7 August	Bristol City	Division Two	13,348	London Irish					
2000–01	Division Two	12,647 (▲41%)	16 May	Wigan Athletic	Division Two play-offs	22,034	Premiership	6,305 (▲)	17 March	Northampton Saints	Premiership	12,037
2001–02	Division Two	14,115 (▲12%)	13 April	Peterborough United	Division Two	22,151	Premiership	7,254 (▲)	16 March	Bristol	Premiership	12,873
2002–03	Division One	16,011 (▲13%)	14 May	Wolverhampton Wanderers	Division One play-offs	24,060	Premiership	9,916 (▲)	15 March	Harlequins	Premiership	18,585
2003–04	Division One	15,095 (▼6%)	3 December	Chelsea	League Cup	24,107	Premiership	10,571 (▲)	21 March	Bath	Premiership	20,840
2004–05	Championship	17,169 (▲14%)	22 January	Ipswich Town	Championship	23,203	Premiership	10,312 (▼)	26 March	Gloucester	Premiership	17,111
2005–06	Championship	20,207 (▲18%)	10 February	Southampton	Championship	23,845	Premiership	10,953 (▲)	25 March	Sale Sharks	Premiership	19,884
2006–07	Premier League	23,829 (▲18%)	10 February	Aston Villa	Premiership	24,122	Premiership	10,731 (▼)	18 March	London Wasps	Premiership	22,648
2007–08	Premier League	23,585 (▼1%)	19 January	Manchester United	Premier League	24,135	Premiership	9,950 (▼)	16 March	London Wasps	Premiership	23,709
2008–09	Championship	19,936 (▼16%)	3 May	Birmingham City	Championship	23,879	Premiership	11,378 (▲)	22 March	Northampton Saints	Premiership	21,295
2009–10	Championship	17,408 (▼13%)	2 January	Liverpool	FA Cup	23,656	Premiership	14,303 (▲)	28 March	Sale Sharks	Premiership	21,535
2010–11	Championship	17,682 (▲2%)	27 November	Leeds United	Championship	23,677	Premiership	10,339 (▼)	26 March	Exeter Chiefs	Premiership	20,011
2011–12	Championship	19,219 (▲9%)	10 December	West Ham United	Championship	24,026	Premiership	10,398 (▲)	25 March	Leicester Tigers	Premiership	20,905
2012–13	Premier League	23,862 (▲24%)	17 November	Everton	Premier League	24,184	Premiership	9,471 (▼)	23 March	Worcester Warriors	Premiership	19,523
2013–14	Championship	19,171 (▼20%)	3 May	Burnley	Championship	23,335	Premiership	9,243 (▼)	22 March	Bath	Premiership	22,361
2014–15	Championship	17,022 (▼11%)	16 March	Bradford City	FA Cup	22,908	Premiership	8,943 (▼)	28 March	Newcastle Falcons	Premiership	15,731
2015–16	Championship	17,285 (▲2%)	11 March	Crystal Palace	FA Cup	23,110	Premiership	8,749 (▼)	20 March	Gloucester	Premiership	17,752
2016–17	Championship	17,505 (▲1%)	1 April	Leeds United	Championship	23,055	Championship	4,005 (▼)	18 March	Cornish Pirates	Championship	11,671
2017–18	Championship	16,656 (▼5%)	23 December	Burton Albion	Championship	21,771	Premiership	7,748 (▲)	24 March	Gloucester	Premiership	15,274
2018–19	Championship	14,991 (▼10%)	22 April	West Bromwich Albion	Championship	17,255	Championship	3,770 (▼)	23 March	Doncaster Knights	Championship	10,106
2019–20	Championship	14,407 (▼) (Note: Five matches were played behind closed doors due to the COVID-19 pandemic. These matches are removed from the average attendance.)	26 November	Leeds United	Championship	16,918	Premiership	4,535 (▲)	22 December	Bath	Premiership	9,259
							Reading Women					
2020–21	Championship	—N/a (Note: Most of the season was played behind closed doors due to the COVID-19 pandemic. Only the matches against Nottingham Forest (5 Dec), Birmingham City (9 Dec), and Norwich City (16 Dec) were played with spectators, with a maximum capacity of 2,000 people.)	Multiple	Multiple	Championship	2,000	Women's Super League	—N/a (Note: Most of the season was played behind closed doors due to the COVID-19 pandemic. Only the matches against Bristol City (6 Dec; 433 spectators) and Manchester United (13 Dec; 623 spectators) were played with spectators.)	13 December	Manchester United	Women's Super League	623
2021–22	Championship	12,852 (▼)	12 February	Coventry City	Championship	22,692	Women's Super League	827 (▲)	12 March	Manchester United	Women's Super League	1,371
2022–23	Championship	13,449 (▲)	29 April	Wigan Athletic	Championship	21,919	Women's Super League	2,332 (▲)	27 May	Chelsea	Women's Super League	6,305
2023–24	League One	13,115 (▼)	27 April	Blackpool	League One	18,480	Women's Championship	—N/a	—N/a	—N/a	Women's Championship	—N/a
2024–25	League One	12,535 (▼)	3 May	Barnsley	League One	21,481	—N/a	—N/a	—N/a	—N/a	—N/a	—N/a
2025–26	League One	12,194 (▼)	6 April	Lincoln City	League One	17,144	—N/a	—N/a	—N/a	—N/a	—N/a	—N/a

== Transport ==
On Reading match days, the stadium is served by a network of special bus services provided by Reading Buses and Stagecoach Buses. Two of these (Reading Buses F1 and F2) provide regular shuttle services from Reading railway station and from a park and ride site at Shinfield Park respectively. Fourteen further Reading Bus services provide links from various Reading suburbs and nearby towns and villages, including Newbury and Henley on Thames. Stagecoach services provide links from Basingstoke, Farnborough, Wokingham and Bracknell.

When no matches are taking place, the stadium can be reached from Reading town centre using Reading Buses Greenwave services.

The stadium is also close to Reading Green Park railway station, which also serves the adjacent Green Park Business Park. It is on the Reading–Basingstoke line and opened in May 2023. The new station is just under a 1-mile (1.6 km) walk from the stadium.

== See also ==
- Lists of stadiums
- List of football stadiums in England
