= Andy Polston =

English footballer

Andy Polston (born 26 July 1970) is a former footballer who played as a defender for Tottenham Hotspur, Gillingham, Cambridge United and Brighton. After leaving Brighton he moved into non-league football where he played for St Albans City, Braintree Town, Boreham Wood and Ford United. He became player/assistant manager of Billericay Town in May 2003.

Polston's only appearance for the Tottenham first team came on 3 March 1990, when he and his brother John became the first brothers to play in the same Tottenham side since 1912.
