= Andy Wright (footballer) =

English association football player

Personal information
- Full name: Andrew James Wright
- Date of birth: 21 October 1978 (age 48)
- Place of birth: Leeds, England
- Height: 6 ft 0 in (1.83 m)
- Position: Winger

Youth career
- Leeds United

Senior career*
Years	Team	Apps	(Gls)
1995–1999	Leeds United	0	(0)
1998	→ Reading (loan)	2	(0)
1999–2000	Fortuna Sittard	6	(0)
2001	Harrogate Town		
2001–2002	SV Meerssen		
2002	Scarborough		
2002	Droylsden		
2002	Whitby Town		
2002–2004	Bradford Park Avenue		
2004	Wakefield & Emley		
2004	Harrogate Town		
2004–2005	Wakefield & Emley		
2005	Sutton Town		
2005–2006	Wakefield & Emley		
2006	Stocksbridge Park Steels		
2006	Worksop Town		
2006–2007	Stocksbridge Park Steels		
2007	Worksop Town		
2007–2008	Leigh RMI		
2008–2009	Blyth Spartans		
2009	Newcastle Blue Star		
2009–2010	Harrogate Railway Athletic		
Total		8+	(0+)
- * Club domestic league appearances and goals

Andrew James Wright (born 21 October 1978) is an English former professional footballer who played as a winger.

== Career ==
Born in Leeds, Wright played for Leeds United, Reading, Fortuna Sittard, Harrogate Town, SV Meerssen, Scarborough, Droylsden, Whitby Town, Bradford Park Avenue, Wakefield & Emley, Sutton Town, Stocksbridge Park Steels, Worksop Town, Leigh RMI, Blyth Spartans, Newcastle Blue Star and Harrogate Railway Athletic.
