= Linvoy Primus =

English footballer (born 1973)

Linvoy Primus MBE
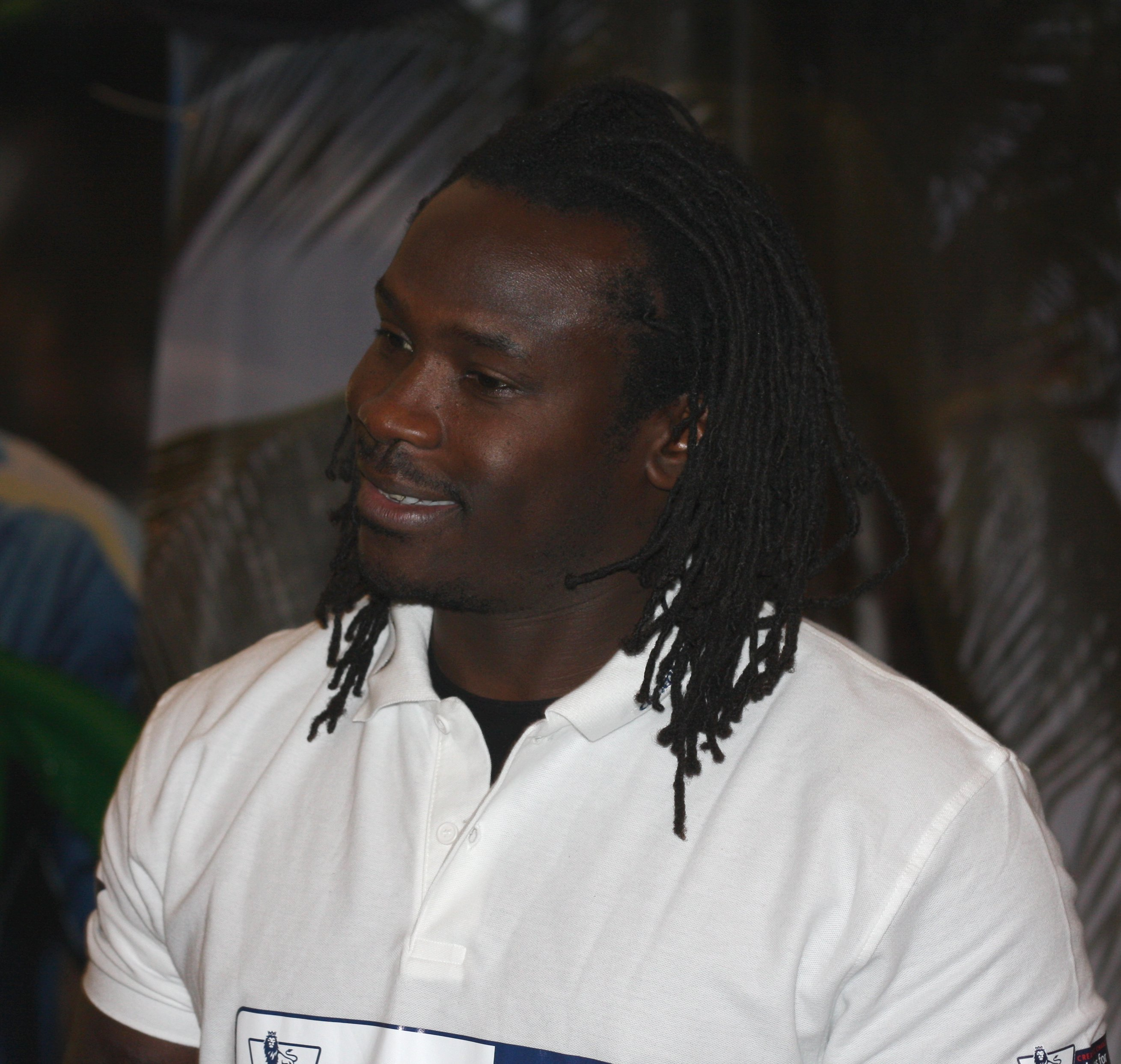
- Primus in 2009

Personal information
- Full name: Linvoy Stephen Primus
- Date of birth: 14 September 1973 (age 53)
- Place of birth: Forest Gate, Greater London, England
- Height: 6 ft 0 in (1.83 m)
- Position: Defender

Youth career
- 1990–1992: Charlton Athletic

Senior career*
Years	Team	Apps	(Gls)
1992–1994	Charlton Athletic	4	(0)
1994–1997	Barnet	127	(7)
1997–2000	Reading	94	(1)
2000–2009	Portsmouth	198	(5)
2008	→ Charlton Athletic (loan)	10	(1)
Total		433	(14)
- * Club domestic league appearances and goals

Linvoy Stephen Primus (born 14 September 1973) is an English former professional footballer who played as a defender.

Born in Forest Gate, England, to Caribbean-born parents, Primus began his professional career at Charlton Athletic, where he made four league appearances. Primus moved on a free transfer to Barnet and established himself as a first team regular in the lower divisions of English football before earning a £250,000 transfer to Reading.

A Bosman transfer to Portsmouth followed after three successful seasons at the Berkshire-based club. Initially, Primus struggled to break into the team and had his progress hindered by injuries. But the 2002–03 season signaled a change in direction as Primus broke into the first team and won Portsmouth fan's player of the season as well as the PFA Fans' Player of the Year for his division. For the next three seasons Primus was in and out of the first team and worked under three managers: Harry Redknapp, Velimir Zajec and Alain Perrin. The 2006–07 season was the last injury-free season for Primus as a career-threatening knee injury meant he would not make an appearance the following season. Primus went out on loan to former club Charlton and made 10 appearances and one further appearance for Portsmouth before retiring through injury in December 2009. The Milton End stand at Fratton Park was renamed the 'Linvoy Primus Community Stand' because of his outstanding services to the club.

Primus, who is married and has three children, is known for his Christian charity work. He is involved in the Christian charity 'Faith & Football' and walked the Great Wall of China to raise £100,000 for their cause. Other charitable causes he has been involved in are the Alpha course, a cinema advertisement about Christianity and the formation of a prayer group at Portsmouth. In 2007, he released his autobiography, titled Transformed, which details his conversion to Christianity.

== Early life ==
Primus was born the first child of Newton and Pauline Primus in Forest Gate Hospital, Forest Gate, Greater London on 14 September 1973. His Jamaican-born mother worked as an orderly at Whipps Cross Hospital in nearby Leytonstone. Primus' father, who was born in St. Vincent and the Grenadines, worked for Thames Water as an engineer. His parents are practising Christians who took Linvoy to church and Sunday school when he was young. In his autobiography he wrote that church was "a cold unwelcoming place" for him as a child but that it "instilled in [him] a very strong sense of right and wrong".

Primus attributed his desire to become a footballer from watching Ricky Villa's winning goal for Tottenham Hotspur against Manchester City in the 1981 FA Cup Final Replay. He played his first game of football two years later in a match between two Cub Scout groups and, because of his performance, he was offered a trial with the Newham District Schools under-11's by one of the Cub Scout leaders who was the manager of the Newham team. Primus was a striker or right winger at this time; in the team was future Portsmouth teammate Sol Campbell who played in midfield.

== Football career ==
=== Early career ===
In Primus' early teenage years he played for his local Sunday league football club, Pretoria, based in Canning Town after being introduced by a school friend. Charlton Athletic arranged a friendly match with Pretoria and Primus was offered the chance to join the Charlton associate schoolboys which he took. For the last two years of his school life, Primus traveled to Greenwich twice a week to train with the team; in addition to this he played matches on a Sunday against the schoolboy teams of clubs such as Maidstone United and Dover Athletic. Primus initially struggled to cope; he cited the "dog eat dog" nature and the "ambitious and aggressive" parents as factors but nevertheless he decided to see it through later remarking that it was a "very strong character building experience".

=== Charlton Athletic ===
After finishing his GCSEs, where he achieved three A grades, Primus signed a two-year apprenticeship with Charlton. He also received an offer from West Ham United, who were in a higher division, but he rejected this because he felt his first team opportunities would be greater at Charlton. Primus was playing in various positions until the club's youth team coach, Colin Clarke, decided that he should play as a centre back, "I see you as a centre back, that way you can see everything you want in front of you".

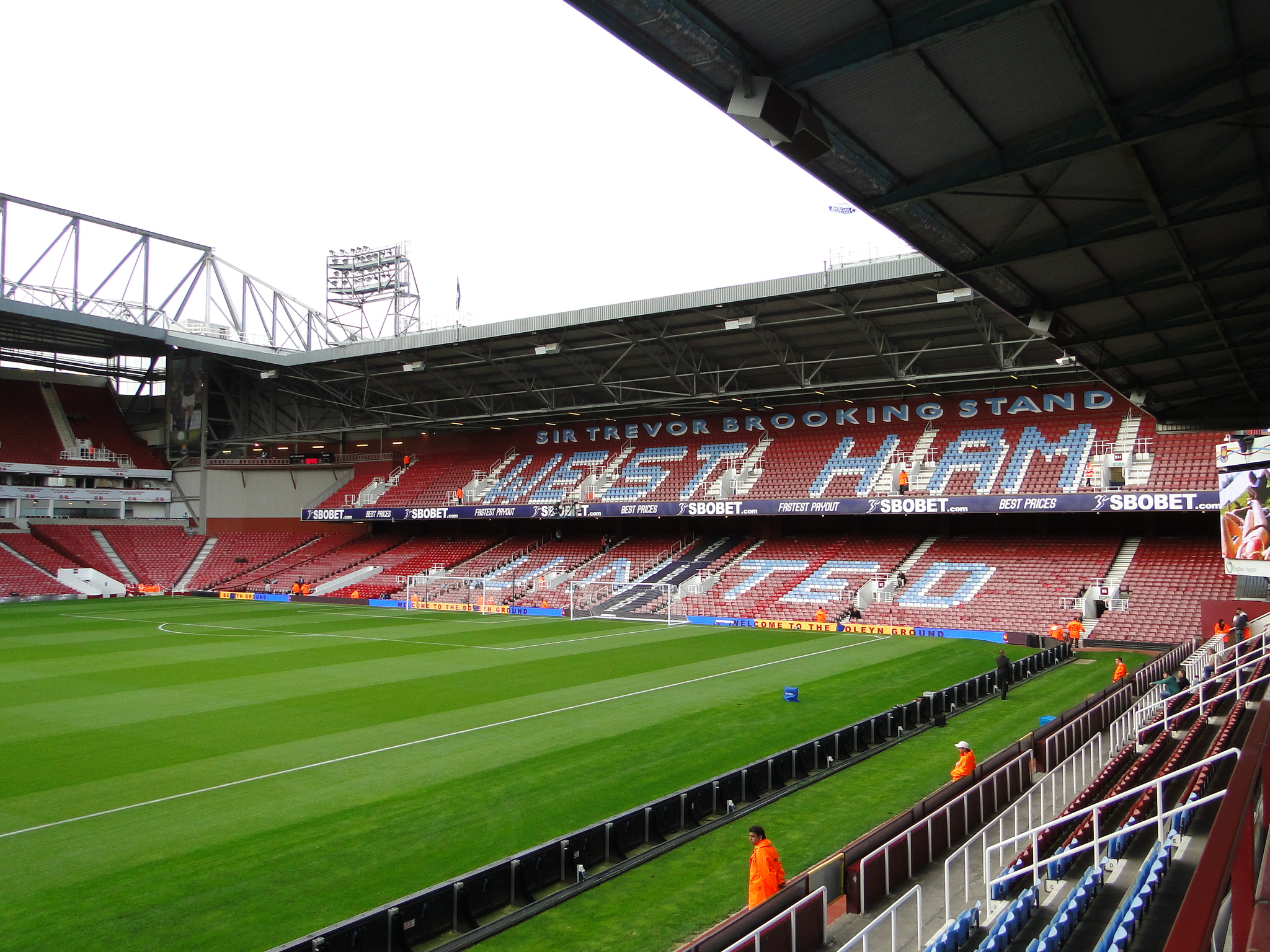
Boleyn Ground, often known as Upton Park, the stadium where Primus made his Charlton debut

Under the Youth Training Scheme, Primus was earning £35 a week while training with the youth and reserve teams as well as having cleaning duties. He had to study Leisure Management at a nearby college which he disliked. Primus, along with Jermaine Darlington, was chosen to travel to Charlton's temporary stadium Selhurst Park to lay out the kits and the boots for the senior players. He admitted this may have earned him "Brownie points" with the youth management. Primus began playing in the reserves under manager Alan Curbishley and, at the end of his apprenticeship, Primus was offered a one-year professional contract by the new youth team coach John Cartwright. Darlington was the only other apprentice who was offered a contract.

Due to injuries to first team centre backs Simon Webster and Darren Pitcher, Primus made his professional debut against Birmingham City. The match took place at their substitute stadium Upton Park in November 1992 and Primus was awarded man of the match for his performance. Primus played the next two matches against Leicester City and Brentford but was disappointed with his performances. Primus made two further first team appearances in the 1992–93 season but soon found himself lower in the pecking order after other players returned from injury and Primus got injured. He felt that he had to leave the club: "I really felt as though I wasn't wanted and that my days were numbered."

Despite this, he signed a one-year extension with the Greenwich-based club. However, he suffered another muscle injury, and with further competition for places in the form of Dean Chandler and Richard Rufus, he failed to make a single appearance for Charlton in the 1993–94 season. He was released at the end of it.

=== Barnet ===
Primus first rejected a trial with Crewe Alexandra before accepting one with Cardiff City. Just three days before his trial with Cardiff was set to begin Ray Clemence, the Barnet manager, offered Primus a two-year contract with the club. It was later revealed that Clemence was told by his assistant, Terry Harvey, that he should sign him immediately: "Get in now and sign him, if he goes down to Cardiff and sees their stadium he will sign for them." Primus was determined to prove Charlton wrong and says he "grew from a boy to a man" at Barnet. This was also a time when depression was common for Primus, and he became addicted to alcohol and drugs such as ecstasy and LSD.

In the second game of the 1994–95 season against Leyton Orient, Primus made his debut as a substitute coming on for the injured Mark Newson. His next appearance for Barnet, against Scarborough, was described as the "worst performance of [his] career" in his autobiography. He went on to say that he was "weighed down by the burden of expectation" and heard someone say he was the "worst player we've ever had at Barnet". He was often nervous before matches and recited the Lord's Prayer as a way of coping with his anxiety. At the end of the season, Primus was runner-up in the voting for the Player of the Season and was man of the match on several occasions. Barnet had a poor start to the next season and they were at the bottom of the table in mid-September. After beating Northampton Town 2–0, Barnet went on an 11-game winning streak which ended at Colchester United despite Primus scoring a goal. He would go on to score five goals in the season; more than any other season in his career. Once again, he was runner-up in the Player of the Season award, this time to the goalkeeper Maik Taylor.

His third season for the club was an unsettled one. The club went through three different managers after the departure of Clemence: Terry Bullivant (twice), Terry Gibson and Alan Mullery. Nevertheless, Barnet narrowly avoided relegation to the Conference and Primus was awarded the Player of the Season and given the captaincy after a season which saw him make 46 league appearances. After Bullivant left for Reading, however, Primus became unsettled and said "[I was] hankering after a move to join Terry [Bullivant] and Pards [Alan Pardew] at Reading".

=== Reading ===
Primus was signed for £500,000 at the start of the 1997–98 season although he found himself being sued by the Stellar Sports Agency after the £8,000 fee was not paid because of difficulties with Primus' agent. Joining him in Berkshire was Barnet teammate Lee Hodges. Primus partnered Keith McPherson in defence but Reading started the season poorly with just one point from the first six games despite Primus saying "I played well from the word go". Due to an injury crisis, Reading lost their penultimate league match at Nottingham Forest and were relegated from Division One. This was Primus' first experience of relegation. Earlier in the season Primus had scored his first and what turned out be only Reading goal in the home match against Forest.

In the next season, Reading finished 10th and faced strong competition from new signing Elroy Kromheer, but Primus became disillusioned at the financial situation he was in. He was on £1,500 a week and commented "[new signings were] on twice the wages I was being paid and I had seen the lifestyles they were enjoying". Primus was promised an improved contract, however no such contract was given to him over the summer. By popular demand, manager Tommy Burns was replaced by Alan Pardew. Fitness problems prevented Primus from getting much first team football at the start of the 1999–2000 season until a change of diet helped him regain stamina. As the season progressed, the club offered Primus a new contract which he dismissed as "derisory" saying the club was "taking advantage of [his] good nature".

At the end of the season, Primus was free to leave under the Bosman ruling and received an offer from Luton Town which he accepted. Lennie Lawrence, the manager who bidded for Primus was sacked soon afterwards, however, and the deal was cancelled to the dismay of Primus who said he felt as if "[his] whole world had collapsed". In the aftermath, Pardew put him in contact with Portsmouth manager Tony Pulis and a trial was agreed.

=== Portsmouth ===
After friendly matches with Dorchester Town and Exeter City, Primus signed a contract with Portsmouth although he was disappointed with the low wages in comparison to other players. He did not get his Portsmouth career off to a good start, scoring an own goal on his debut away at Sheffield United. Pulis was sacked early on in the 2000–01 season after a poor start and was replaced by fans' favourite Steve Claridge. Portsmouth were still near the relegation zone after a poor run of form that also saw Primus being sent off for the first time in his career for a foul on Fulham's Louis Saha. Gilmore's groin ruled him out of action for five months from November of that season, during which Claridge was replaced by Graham Rix, this was after Primus formed a partnership with Jamaican international Darren Moore. After a defeat to Crystal Palace (which Primus described as the "lowest point of [his] career"), Portsmouth needed a victory over Barnsley to stay in Division One and they duly won 3–0 with Huddersfield being relegated after their final day defeat. After the conclusion of the season, Primus fell out with Rix as he was unsure about whether Rix thought he had a future at the club.

The next season started with the death of goalkeeper Aaron Flahavan and the departure of Primus' close friend Moore to West Bromwich Albion. Primus struggled to get a game under Rix but the appointment of Harry Redknapp in March 2002 gave him a new lease of life and he ended that season with two league goals in games against Bradford City and Barnsley.

Despite originally being told by Redknapp he was not of Division One standard, let alone suitable for the Premier League, Primus proved his manager wrong by seizing his chance when other players missed out through injury and suspension. By the end of the 2002–03 season he had become a vital member of the side that won the Division One title, winning the Portsmouth fans' player of the season as well as the PFA accolade for Division One. He scored once that season for Portsmouth in the League Cup against Peterborough United. Primus credits his renaissance to his conversion to Christianity after a friend of his wife's invited him to church.

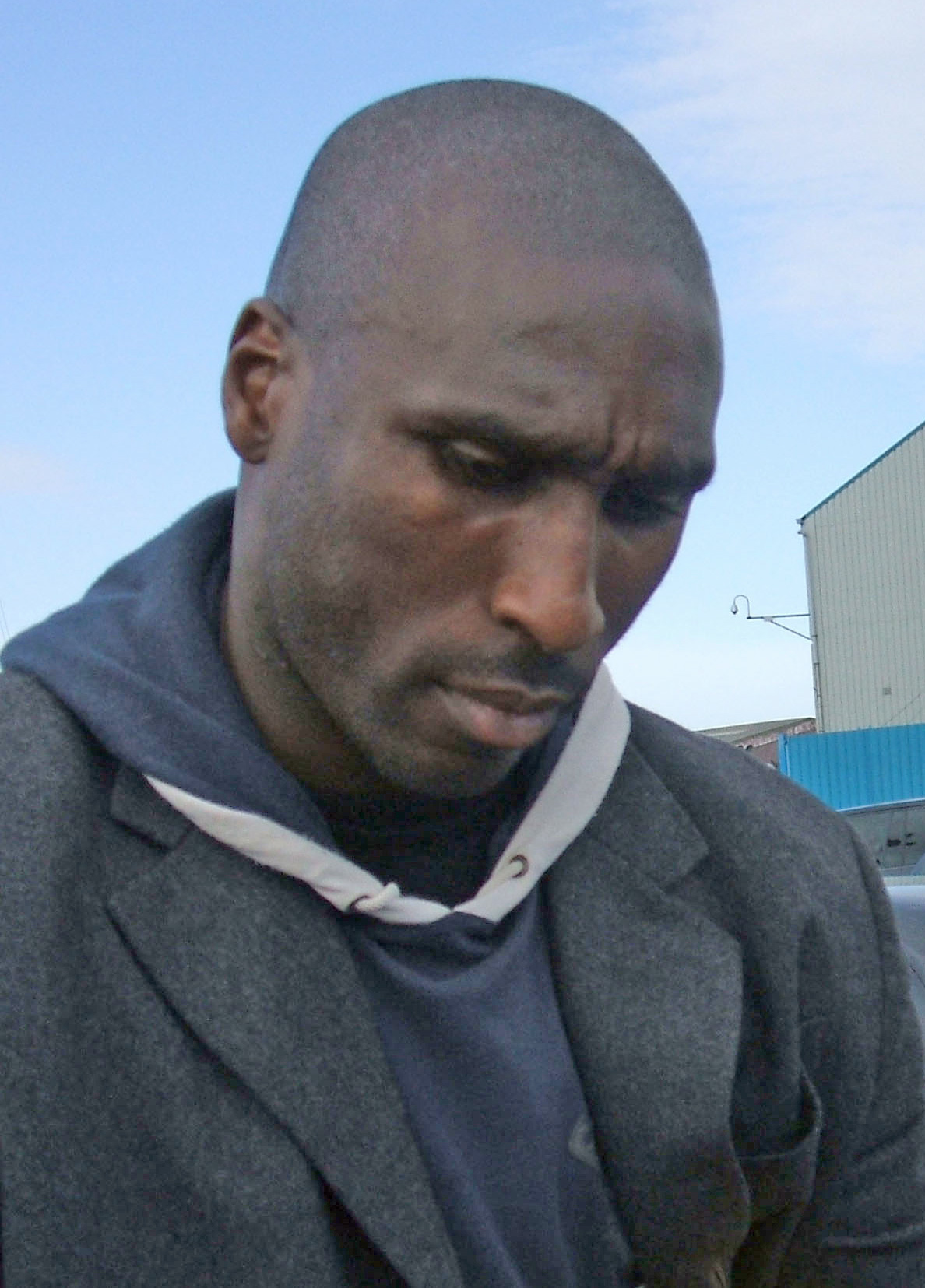
Sol Campbell was Primus' partner in defence for the majority of the 2006–07 season.

Despite the previous season's heroics, Primus was not used regularly in the early part of Portsmouth's first Premier League season. Harry Redknapp had ditched his 3–5–2 formation in favour of the more conventional 4–4–2 and partnered new record signing Dejan Stefanović with Arjan de Zeeuw. During December, Portsmouth were in a terrible run of form and Redknapp decided to bring one of his most reliable players back into his plans for the derby match with Southampton. In spite of a 3–0 loss, Primus retained his starting place for the remainder of the season.

The following season saw Primus remain a regular member of the Portsmouth team under first Redknapp and then both his successors, Velimir Zajec and Alain Perrin. He scored his first Premier League goal at Crystal Palace on Boxing Day 2004. He scored again on Boxing Day in 2006, when grabbing two headed goals against West Ham United.

Although Primus was a regular member of Perrin's team at the end of the 2004–05 season and captained the side on occasions during pre-season, he rarely featured until Perrin's sacking in November. The return of Harry Redknapp, who had been won over by his performances and was now one of his biggest admirers, to Portsmouth lead to Primus' immediate return to the side, and he was ever present in the side that achieved Premiership survival in the last 10 games of the season. Primus remained a regular in the Portsmouth defence for the 2006–07 season, partnering England international Sol Campbell in the centre of defence, and Redknapp hailed him as the unofficial Player of the Season; the official winner of the award was David James. He failed to make an appearance in 2007–08 due to a career threatening knee injury. He was treated with surgery performed by Dr. Richard Steadman who is known to have saved the careers of many footballers, including Alan Shearer and Ronaldo. After the operation, Primus commented "The difference between success and failure is what you do afterwards in your rehabilitation, not necessarily the actual operation." Despite his injury, he still managed to earn a new one-year deal at Portsmouth in May 2008.

=== Charlton Athletic loan and Portsmouth return ===
In August 2008, Primus returned to Charlton Athletic on a loan deal, however the deal almost collapsed as negotiations broke down between Portsmouth manager Harry Redknapp and Charlton manager Alan Pardew. Pardew wanted the centre half for the whole of the 2008–09 season, but Redknapp was only happy to loan him out until Christmas of 2008 to gain match fitness, and it appeared the deal would be called off by Portsmouth. Finally Charlton agreed to the terms and Primus move to the Valley on a three-month loan days before the transfer window closed. He scored his first goal for Charlton in a 5–2 home defeat to Sheffield United. The result ultimately led to the sacking of manager Alan Pardew. He played 10 matches for the Championship (new name for Division One) club before returning to Portsmouth for the rest of the 2008–09 season. He was due to play in a crucial match against Derby County, however the match was postponed by Sky until after the expiration of his loan; Primus' loan had to be rearranged and a deal was agreed by both clubs for the loan to expire after the match against Derby.

"He has been a great servant to the club and is loved by everyone here and in the city."

— Peter Storrie, on Primus' retirement.

After a near two-year absence, Primus made a comeback to the Portsmouth first team on 18 May 2009, the penultimate game of the 2008–09 season, as a late substitute appearance against Sunderland at Fratton Park. He received a standing ovation from the home crowd and was cheered each time he touched the ball.

Primus signed a one-year extension to his contract with Portsmouth in July 2009. Primus also agreed to take on an ambassadorial and advisory role to help guide emerging talent at Portsmouth, as well as a playing role. On 8 December 2009, Primus announced his retirement due to a knee injury. Portsmouth's chief executive Peter Storrie confirmed that Primus would retain his ambassadorial role.

Following his testimonial on 31 July 2010, Portsmouth announced that the Milton End Stand at Fratton Park would be renamed the 'Linvoy Primus Community Stand' because of his outstanding services to the club.

== Personal life ==
At the age of 17, Primus met future wife Trish through a mutual friend. Much to the chagrin of Primus' parents, they decided to have a child after 18 months. The footballer said in his autobiography, "Up until then I had been the model son and had brought no trouble to their door, but now they were upset at what they saw as my rebellion". In November 1993, their first son was born. Their daughter Atlanta, born in April 1997, plays for Southampton FC played in the FA Women's Championship. She previously represented England at youth level and played in the United States for California State University-Fullerton and Chelsea Women Primus and Trish married on 9 June 1999. Their third child, and second son, was born in 2002.

In 2007, he released his autobiography, Transformed, which was co-written by Peter Jeffs. It received generally positive reviews: Christianity Magazine said the book was a "disarmingly honest account of Primus's triumphs and struggles on and off the pitch" while FourFourTwo described it as "an antidote to the 'me-me-me' tales that weigh down the shelves". Rival football magazine When Saturday Comes was more critical, pointing out its "sometimes ungrammatical and often ponderous style" and going on to say "[the] book is also full of cliches".

== Charitable and Christian work ==
Trish suffered from depression and was introduced to Christianity by stable owners, Keith and Sam, who invited the Primus family to join them at church on a Sunday. Initially, Primus was reluctant but Trish convinced him. Primus remarked that it was a case of "well church is the last place we'd go, but why not?" The church was more "laid-back" than the one that Primus attended as a child and he, with the rest of his family, became regular churchgoers in 2001. Trish's depression was lifted and Primus converted to Christianity later that year. "In my heart I felt whole and complete, and I wanted to read the Bible at every opportunity." According to his autobiography, Primus is able to speak in tongues.

"Having travelled to Africa and India to visit orphanages and hospitals, seeing abandoned, orphaned or disabled children living in such poverty makes you appreciate the things we take for granted, even merely having a roof over your head."

— Primus commenting on the charity work he has done and how it affects him.

Primus, with Darren Moore, former footballer Mick Mellows, and former Portsmouth player Joel Ward is involved with the Christian charity 'Faith and Football, and walked the Great Wall of China in summer 2005 to raise £100,000 for Prospect Children's School in Ibadan, Nigeria and a new medical centre, school and orphanage for a village in Goa.

He was also involved in supporting the Alpha course, which is run all over the world, and is designed to explain Christian beliefs and promote discussion. Primus appeared in a cinema advertisement for the movement, alongside the comedian Lennie Bennett. At his former club Portsmouth, he founded a prayer group which has included teammates such as Nwankwo Kanu, Sean Davis and Benjani. In December 2006, he took part in a Football Focus feature on faith in the game presented by fellow Christian footballer Gavin Peacock. On 16 April 2013, Primus played for Portsmouth in a charity match raising money for the Portsmouth supporters trust.

Primus was appointed Member of the Order of the British Empire (MBE) in the 2015 New Year Honours for services to football and charity in Portsmouth.

== Career statistics ==
Appearances and goals by club, season and competition
Club	Season	League			Cup		League Cup		Continental		Total	
Club	Season	Division	Apps	Goals	Apps	Goals	Apps	Goals	Apps	Goals	Apps	Goals
Charlton Athletic	1992–93	First Division	4	0	—		1	0	—		5	0
Charlton Athletic	1993–94	First Division	–		—		—		—		—	
Charlton Athletic	Total		4	0	0	0	1	0	—		5	0
Barnet	1994–95	Third Division	39	0	2	0	4	0	—		45	0
Barnet	1995–96	Third Division	42	4	2	1	4	0	—		48	5
Barnet	1996–97	Third Division	46	3	1	0	4	0	—		51	3
Barnet	Total		127	7	5	1	12	0	—		144	8
Reading	1997–98	First Division	35	1	1	0	6	0	—		42	1
Reading	1998–99	Second Division	31	0	1	0	3	0	—		35	0
Reading	1999–2000	Second Division	28	0	4	0	—		—		32	0
Reading	Total		94	1	6	0	9	0	—		109	1
Portsmouth	2000–01	First Division	23	0	—		3	0	—		26	0
Portsmouth	2001–02	First Division	22	2	1	0	—		—		23	2
Portsmouth	2002–03	First Division	40	0	1	0	2	1	—		43	1
Portsmouth	2003–04	Premier League	21	0	4	0	1	0	—		26	0
Portsmouth	2004–05	Premier League	35	1	2	0	3	0	—		40	1
Portsmouth	2005–06	Premier League	20	0	1	0	—		—		21	0
Portsmouth	2006–07	Premier League	36	2	2	0	1	0	—		39	2
Portsmouth	2007–08	Premier League	–		—		—		—		—	
Portsmouth	2008–09	Premier League	1	0	0	0	0	0	—		1	0
Portsmouth	Total		198	5	11	0	10	1	—		219	6
Charlton Athletic	2008–09	Championship	10	1	—		—		—		10	1
Career total			433	14	22	1	32	1	—		487	16

== Honours ==
Portsmouth

- Football League First Division: 2002–03

Individual

- PFA Fans' Player of the Year: 2002–03 First Division
- Portsmouth Player of the Season: 2003
- Portsmouth Hall of Fame: 2010
