= Alan Beeton =

English footballer

Personal information
- Date of birth: 4 October 1978 (age 48)
- Place of birth: Watford, England
- Position: Defender

Senior career*
Years	Team	Apps	(Gls)
1996–2001	Wycombe Wanderers	55	(0)
- Chesham United
- * Club domestic league appearances and goals

Alan Beeton (born 4 October 1978) is an English former footballer who played in the Football League for Wycombe Wanderers.
