= Byron Glasgow =

English footballer

Personal information
- Date of birth: 18 February 1979 (age 47)
- Place of birth: London, England
- Height: 5 ft 6 in (1.68 m)
- Position: Midfielder

Youth career
- Arsenal
- Reading

Senior career*
Years	Team	Apps	(Gls)
1996–1999	Reading	39	(1)
1999	Crawley Town		
- Walton & Hersham
- St Albans City
2001–2003	Carshalton Athletic		
2003	Croydon Athletic		
2011–2012	East Grinstead Town		
- * Club domestic league appearances and goals as of 15:45, 10 December 2012 (UTC)

Byron Glasgow (born 18 February 1979) is an English footballer who plays as a midfielder. He began his career on the books at Arsenal before moving to Reading and graduating from the youth setup.

He made his debut in the FA Cup against Southampton on 4 January 1997 and scored his only goal for the club away at Notts County on 30 January 1999. He was sacked by Reading in 1999 after testing positive for cocaine and cannabis.

After leaving Reading he attracted interest from Swindon Town and had a trial at Northampton Town before joining Crawley Town on non-contract terms in November 1999. He has since gone on to represent a number of non league teams, playing for Walton & Hersham and St Albans City before joining Carshalton Athletic in March 2001. He joined Croydon Athletic in March 2003 but left the club a few months later in July.

On 9 December 2011 Glasgow joined Sussex County Football League side East Grinstead Town until the end of the season.

== Career statistics (partial) ==
As of match played 24 April 1999.

Appearances and goals by club, season and competition
Club	Season	League			FA Cup		League Cup		Other		Total	
Club	Season	Division	Apps	Goals	Apps	Goals	Apps	Goals	Apps	Goals	Apps	Goals
Reading	1996–97	First Division	4	0	1	0	0	0	—		5	0
Reading	1997–98	First Division	3	0	0	0	0	0	—		3	0
Reading	1998–99	Second Division	32	1	1	0	2	0	1 (Note: Appearance in the Football League Trophy)	0	36	1
Career total			39	1	2	0	2	0	1	0	44	1
