= Chris Casper =

English footballer (born 1975)

Personal information
- Full name: Christopher Martin Casper
- Date of birth: 28 April 1975 (age 51)
- Place of birth: Burnley, Lancashire, England
- Height: 6 ft 0 in (1.83 m)
- Position: Defender

Team information
- Current team: Burnley (academy manager)

Youth career
- 1991–1993: Manchester United

Senior career*
Years	Team	Apps	(Gls)
1993–1998	Manchester United	2	(0)
1996	→ AFC Bournemouth (loan)	16	(1)
1997	→ Swindon Town (loan)	10	(1)
1998	→ Reading (loan)	8	(0)
1998–2000	Reading	39	(0)
Total		75	(2)

International career
1992–1993	England U18	8	(0)
1995	England U21	1	(0)

Managerial career
- 2002–2003: Team Bath
- 2005–2008: Bury
- * Club domestic league appearances and goals

Christopher Martin Casper (born 28 April 1975) is an English football manager and former player who is the academy manager at EFL Championship side Burnley.

As a player he was a defender who played in the Premier League for Manchester United and in the Football League for AFC Bournemouth, Swindon Town and Reading. An injury forced him to retire from playing in 2000 at the age of 24.

Casper proceeded into management and took charge of Team Bath in 2002 before moving to Football League Two club Bury for three years. At the time, he was the youngest manager in the top four tiers of the English football league system. However, a run of poor form in 2008 led to his departure from Bury. Casper then took backroom jobs at Bradford City and Grimsby Town, before joining the Premier League as a club support manager.

== Early life ==
Casper was born in Burnley, Lancashire, and attended the town's St Theodore's RC High School. He is the son of former Burnley forward and manager Frank Casper.

== Playing career ==
=== Manchester United ===
Casper joined Manchester United as a trainee in 1991 and played in their FA Youth Cup winning team a year later. When still only 17, he signed professional terms in January 1993, making his United debut in the League Cup game against Port Vale at Old Trafford on 5 October 1994. Casper was a product of the same United youth setup that sparked the highly successful careers of players such as David Beckham, Paul Scholes, Gary Neville, Phil Neville and Nicky Butt, who all spent a decade or more with the club, helping them win numerous trophies and also being regular members of the England national football team.

Casper served as captain of the England youth team, and was a member of the UEFA European Under-18 Championship winning side in 1993. He also appeared for the England under-21 side in the Toulon Tournament against Malaysia in June 1995. Casper later had several spells on loan at AFC Bournemouth and Swindon Town during the 1990s, but was unable to claim a regular place in the first team at Old Trafford and he was sold to Division Two side Reading in November 1998 for £300,000.

=== Reading ===
He was playing for Reading against Cardiff City in a Division Two fixture on Boxing Day 1999 when he suffered a double leg fracture. This was the last professional game that Casper, then aged 24, ever played, as he announced his retirement in 2002 after failing to recover sufficiently from the injury. He had returned to action in 2001 for Reading's reserves, but recurring pain forced the retirement.

In 2003, Casper's court case against Carpenter was due to begin before Carpenter admitted liability and proceedings were stopped. The following year, Casper was awarded an undisclosed compensation, believed to be £1m, in an out-of-court settlement with Richard Carpenter, the Cardiff City player whose tackle had caused his career-ending injury. By this stage, Casper was a youth team coach at Bury.

== Personal life ==
He is the father of former Burnley goalkeeper, Charlie Casper.

== Managerial and coaching career ==
=== Team Bath ===
While undergoing rehabilitation at the University of Bath, he coached Team Bath along with Paul Tisdale, and it was that side that reached the first round of the FA Cup in 2002–03.

=== Bury ===
He left to join Bury as youth coach before taking charge of the reserves in the 2004–05 season. At the beginning of the 2005–06 season, with six defeats from the first nine games, he replaced Graham Barrow as manager. Casper offered to resign in 2006 when Bury were thrown out of the FA Cup in the 2006–07 season for fielding an ineligible player, but this was rejected by the club's board. After a run of poor results he was fired in January 2008.

=== Bradford City ===
Five months later, he was appointed youth team coach at fellow League Two side Bradford City, taking over from Jon Pepper.

=== Grimsby Town ===
On 1 December 2009, Casper was appointed assistant manager to Neil Woods at Grimsby Town, replacing Brian Stein. Town suffered relegation from the Football League and Casper stepped down as assistant manager at the end of the season.

=== FA Premier League ===
On 30 June 2010, Casper joined the Premier League as a club support manager working within the academy system. The role sees him working with the eight top-flight clubs in the north west to help them implement educational programmes and work with their academies.

== Managerial statistics ==
Team	Nat	From	To	Record				
Team	Nat	From	To	G	W	D	L	Win %
Bury	(England)	19 September 2005	14 January 2008	113	36	33	44	27.06

== Honours ==
Manchester United

- FA Charity Shield: 1994

England U18

- UEFA European Under-18 Championship: 1993
