= Neville Stamp =

English footballer

Personal information
- Full name: Neville Stamp
- Date of birth: 7 July 1981 (age 45)
- Place of birth: Reading, Berkshire, England
- Height: 5 ft 11 in (1.80 m)
- Position: Defender

Youth career
- –1998: Reading

Senior career*
| Years | Team | Apps | (Gls) |
| 1998–2000 | Reading | 1 | (0) |
| 2000–2002 | York City | 20 | (0) |
| 2002– | Basingstoke Town | | |
| Total | | 21 | (0) |
- * Club domestic league appearances and goals

Neville Stamp (born 7 July 1981) is an English former professional footballer who played as a defender in the Football League for Reading and York City, and in non-League football for Basingstoke Town.
