= Peter van der Kwaak =

Dutch footballer

Personal information
- Full name: Peter van der Kwaak
- Date of birth: 12 October 1968 (age 58)
- Place of birth: Haarlem, Netherlands
- Position: Goalkeeper

Senior career*
Years	Team	Apps	(Gls)
1994–1998	Dordrecht	17	(0)
1998–2000	Reading	4	(0)
2000	→ Carlisle United (loan)	2	(0)
2000–2002	Go Ahead Eagles	3	(0)
2002–2004	Excelsior	11	(0)
- * Club domestic league appearances and goals

Peter van der Kwaak (born 12 October 1968) is a Dutch footballer who played in The Football League for Carlisle United and Reading.
