= John Polston =

English footballer

Personal information
- Full name: John David Polston
- Date of birth: 10 June 1968 (age 58)
- Place of birth: Walthamstow, England
- Height: 5 ft 11 in (1.80 m)
- Position: Defender

Youth career
- 1984–1985: Tottenham Hotspur

Senior career*
| Years | Team | Apps | (Gls) |
| 1985–1990 | Tottenham Hotspur | 24 | (1) |
| 1990–1998 | Norwich City | 215 | (8) |
| 1998–2001 | Reading | 18 | (1) |
| Total | | 257 | (10) |

International career
| 1985 | England U17 | 2 | (0) |
| 1985–1986 | England Youth | 2 | (0) |
- * Club domestic league appearances and goals

John David Polston (born 10 June 1968) is an English football coach and former professional footballer.

He was a defender who began his career with Tottenham, before notably playing for Norwich City where he featured in the Premier League and UEFA Cup. He later retired with a spell in the Football League with Reading.

== Playing career ==
In March 1990, Polston and his brother Andy, became the first brothers to play together in the Spurs first team since 1912, although neither was a regular player and Andy played just once for Spurs. John left Spurs in 1990, after making 28 appearances for the club, when Norwich manager Dave Stringer paid £300,000 for him.

Polston was a key member of the Norwich team that finished third in the inaugural season of the Premier League (1992–93) and captained the side in the club's first ever European tie (in the UEFA Cup against Vitesse Arnhem) the following season, scoring the second goal in a 3–0 win. In the run-in to the end of the 1992–93 season, he scored a vital winning goal against Aston Villa at Carrow Road the day after his wife had given birth to their first child, Ron Aidy Polston.

Following his release from Norwich in 1998, Polston joined Reading. Polston retired from football in April 2001 after failing to recover from a knee injury. John is now a personal trainer.

== Coaching career ==
In September 2018, Polston join John Madejski Academy's Football team as Lead Development Squad coach.

== Personal life ==
His brother Andy was also a professional player and the two were on the books of Tottenham at the same time.
