= Elroy Kromheer =

Dutch footballer (born 1970)

Personal information
- Full name: Elroy Patrick Kromheer
- Date of birth: 15 January 1970 (age 56)
- Place of birth: Amsterdam, Netherlands
- Position: Defender

Senior career*
Years	Team	Apps	(Gls)
1989–1992	Volendam	72	(7)
1992–1993	Motherwell	24	(1)
1993–1996	Volendam	84	(4)
1996–1998	Zwolle	62	(4)
1998–1999	Reading	24	(0)
1999–2000	1. FC Nürnberg	12	(0)
- * Club domestic league appearances and goals

Elroy Patrick Kromheer (born 15 January 1970) is a Dutch former footballer who played in The Football League for Reading and in the Scottish Football League for Motherwell.

Elroy was twice signed for £250,000, the first occasion was in July 1992 when he joined Motherwell from Volendam. The second occasion was when he joined Reading from Zwolle.
