= 2000–01 Reading F.C. season =

Reading
2000–01 season
- Chairman: John Madejski
- Manager: Alan Pardew
- Second Division: 3rd
- FA Cup: Second Round vs York City
- League Cup: First Round vs Leyton Orient
- League Trophy: Quarter-final vs Swansea City
- Top goalscorer: League: Jamie Cureton (26); All: Jamie Cureton (30)
- Highest home attendance: 22,034 vs Wigan Athletic (16 May 2001)
- Lowest home attendance: 4,337 vs Leyton Orient (5 September 2000)
- Average home league attendance: 12,218
Home colours

The 2000–01 season was Reading's third season in Division Two, following their relegation from the Division One in 1998. It was Alan Pardew's second season as manager of the club. Reading finished the season in third place, qualifying for the Playoffs, where they were defeated in the final by Walsall 3–2. In the FA Cup, Reading were knocked out by York City after a replay in the Second Round, whilst in the League Cup, Leyton Orient defeated Reading over two legs in the First Round. Reading also reached the Second Round of the League Trophy, before defeat to Swansea City.

== Season review ==
See also Nationwide League Division Two

== Squad ==
As of match played 27 May 2001

No.	Name	Nationality	Position	Date of birth (Age (Note: Age as of the end of the season))	Signed from	Signed in	Contract ends	Apps.	Goals
Goalkeepers
1	Phil Whitehead	(England)	GK	17 December 1969 (aged 31)	West Bromwich Albion	1999		67	0
21	Scott Howie	(Scotland)	GK	4 January 1972 (aged 29)	Motherwell	1998		102	0
31	Jamie Ashdown	(England)	GK	30 November 1980 (aged 20)	Academy	1998		1	0
36	Simon Cox	(Republic of Ireland)	GK	24 March 1984 (aged 17)	Academy	2000		0	0
Defenders
3	Matthew Robinson	(England)	DF	23 December 1974 (aged 26)	Portsmouth	2000		59	0
5	Adi Viveash	(England)	DF	30 September 1969 (aged 31)	Walsall	2000	2003	62	3
6	Barry Hunter	(Northern Ireland)	DF	18 November 1968 (aged 32)	Wrexham	1996		100	6
7	Graeme Murty	(England) (Note: Graeme Murty was born in Saltburn-by-the-Sea, England, but also qualified to represent Scotland internationally through his father, going on to make his debut for Scotland in 2004.)	DF	13 November 1974 (aged 26)	York City	1998		59	1
18	Andy Gurney	(England)	DF	25 January 1974 (aged 27)	Torquay United	1999		84	3
20	Chris Casper	(England)	DF	28 April 1975 (aged 26)	Manchester United	1998		55	0
23	John Mackie	(England)	DF	5 July 1976 (aged 24)	Sutton United	1999		16	0
25	Ricky Newman	(England)	DF	5 August 1970 (aged 30)	Millwall	2000		51	2
28	Chris Smith	(England)	DF	30 June 1981 (aged 19)	Academy	1999		0	0
29	Ady Williams	(Wales) (Note: Ady Williams was born in Reading, England, but also qualified to represent Wales internationally through his father, and would make his international debut for Wales on 23 May 1994.)	DF	16 September 1971 (aged 29)	Wolverhampton Wanderers	2000	2003		
32	Ricky Allaway	(England)	DF	12 February 1983 (aged 18)	Academy	1999		0	0
34	Adrian Whitbread	(England)	DF	22 October 1971 (aged 29)	loan from Portsmouth	2001	2001	19	0
35	Nicky Shorey	(England)	DF	19 February 1981 (aged 20)	Leyton Orient	2001	2004	0	0
Midfielders
4	Keith Jones	(England)	MF	14 October 1965 (aged 35)	Charlton Athletic	2000	2002	28	1
8	Darren Caskey	(England)	MF	21 August 1974 (aged 26)	Tottenham Hotspur	1996		233	45
11	Lee Hodges	(England)	MF	4 September 1973 (aged 27)	Barnet	1997		99	10
14	Sammy Igoe	(England)	MF	30 September 1975 (aged 25)	Portsmouth	2000		46	6
16	Phil Parkinson	(England)	MF	1 December 1967 (aged 33)	Bury	1992		382	21
17	Neil Smith	(England)	MF	30 September 1971 (aged 29)	Fulham	1999		60	2
19	Joe Gamble	(Republic of Ireland)	MF	14 January 1982 (aged 19)	Cork City	2000		3	0
30	Alex Haddow	(England)	MF	8 January 1982 (aged 19)	Academy	1999		4	0
37	Tony Rougier	(Trinidad and Tobago)	MF	17 July 1971 (aged 29)	Port Vale	2000	2003	38	2
40	James Harper	(England)	MF	9 November 1980 (aged 20)	Arsenal	2001	2005	14	1
Forwards
9	Martin Butler	(England)	FW	15 September 1974 (aged 26)	Cambridge United	2000		72	32
10	Nicky Forster	(England)	FW	8 September 1973 (aged 27)	Birmingham City	1999		56	12
12	Jamie Cureton	(England)	FW	28 August 1975 (aged 25)	Bristol Rovers	2000	2003	53	30
22	Jim McIntyre	(Scotland)	FW	24 May 1972 (aged 29)	Kilmarnock	1998		114	16
24	Darius Henderson	(England)	FW	7 September 1981 (aged 19)	Academy	1999		12	0
27	Nathan Tyson	(England)	FW	4 May 1982 (aged 19)	Academy	1999		1	0
Out on loan
33	Adam Lockwood	(England)	DF	26 October 1981 (aged 19)	Academy	1999		0	0
Left during the season
2	John Polston	(England)	DF	10 June 1968 (aged 32)	Norwich City	1998		24	1
13	Keith Scott	(England)	FW	9 June 1967 (aged 33)	Wycombe Wanderers	1999		44	8
15	Sean Evers	(England)	MF	10 October 1977 (aged 23)	Luton Town	1999		27	0
26	Stuart Gray	(Scotland) (Note: Stuart Gray was born in Harrogate, England, but also qualified to represent Scotland internationally, representing Scotland U21 between 1995 and 1996.)	DF	18 December 1973 (aged 27)	Celtic	1998		64	2
32	Phil Hadland	(England)	MF	20 October 1980 (aged 20)	Academy	1998		1	0
	Neville Stamp	(England)	DF	7 July 1981 (aged 19)	Academy	1998		1	0

=== Out on loan ===
Note: Flags indicate national team as defined under FIFA eligibility rules; some limited exceptions apply. Players may hold more than one non-FIFA nationality.

No.	Pos.	Nation	Player
33	DF	ENG	Adam Lockwood (at Forest Green Rovers)

=== Left club during season ===
Note: Flags indicate national team as defined under FIFA eligibility rules; some limited exceptions apply. Players may hold more than one non-FIFA nationality.

No.	Pos.	Nation	Player
2	DF	ENG	John Polston (Retired)
13	FW	ENG	Keith Scott (to Colchester United)
15	MF	ENG	Sean Evers (to Plymouth Argyle)

No.	Pos.	Nation	Player
26	DF	SCO	Stuart Gray (to Rushden & Diamonds)
32	MF	ENG	Phil Hadland (to Rochdale)
—	DF	ENG	Neville Stamp (to York City)

== Transfers ==
=== In ===
Date	Position	Nationality	Name	From	Fee	Ref.
3 July 2000	DF	(England)	Adi Viveash	Walsall	Free	
3 July 2000	DF	(Wales)	Ady Williams	Wolverhampton Wanderers	Free	
3 July 2000	MF	(England)	Keith Jones	Charlton Athletic	Free	
25 July 2000	DF	(England)	Ricky Newman	Millwall	Free	
8 August 2000	MF	(Republic of Ireland)	Joe Gamble	Cork City	Free	
11 August 2000	MF	(Trinidad and Tobago)	Tony Rougier	Port Vale	£325,000	
21 August 2000	FW	(England)	Jamie Cureton	Bristol Rovers	£250,000	
9 February 2001	DF	(England)	Nicky Shorey	Leyton Orient	£25,000	
28 February 2001	MF	(England)	James Harper	Arsenal	Undisclosed	

=== Loans in ===
Date from	Position	Nationality	Name	From	Date to	Ref.
9 February 2001	DF	(England)	Adrian Whitbread	Portsmouth	End of Season	

=== Out ===
Date	Position	Nationality	Name	To	Fee	Ref.
7 August 2000	MF	(England)	Phil Hadland	Rochdale	Free	
11 October 2000	MF	(England)	Neville Stamp	York City		
14 March 2001	MF	(Scotland)	Stuart Gray	Rushden & Diamonds	Free	
19 March 2001	FW	(England)	Keith Scott	Colchester United	Free	

=== Loans out ===
Date from	Position	Nationality	Name	To	Date to	Ref.
27 July 2000	MF	(England)	Alex Haddow	Barnet	One-Month	
12 October 2000	FW	(England)	Keith Scott	Colchester United	One-Month	
14 October 2000	MF	(England)	Sean Evers	St Johnstone	15 January 2001	
12 March 2001	FW	(England)	Nathan Tyson	Maidenhead United	12 April 2001	
22 March 2001	DF	(England)	Adam Lockwood	Forest Green Rovers	End of Season	

=== Released ===
Date	Position	Nationality	Name	Joined	Date	Ref.
8 March 2001	MF	(England)	Sean Evers	Plymouth Argyle	8 March 2001	
April 2001	DF	(England)	John Polston	Retired		
30 June 2001	GK	(Republic of Ireland)	Simon Cox	Oxford United		
30 June 2001	GK	(Scotland)	Scott Howie	Bristol Rovers	31 July 2001	
30 June 2001	DF	(England)	Andy Gurney	Swindon Town	21 June 2001†	
30 June 2001	DF	(England)	Chris Smith	York City	26 May 2001†	
30 June 2001	MF	(England)	Darren Caskey	Notts County	27 June 2001†	
30 June 2001	MF	(England)	Alex Haddow	Carlisle United		
30 June 2001	MF	(England)	Lee Hodges	Plymouth Argyle		
30 June 2001	FW	(Scotland)	Jim McIntyre	Dundee United		

† Transfers announced on the above date, being finalised on 1 July 2001.

== Competitions ==
=== Second Division ===
==== Results summary ====
Overall								Home						Away					
Pld	W	D	L	GF	GA	GD	Pts	W	D	L	GF	GA	GD	W	D	L	GF	GA	GD
46	25	11	10	86	52	+34	86	15	5	3	58	26	+32	10	6	7	28	26	+2

==== Results by round ====
Round	1	2	3	4	5	6	7	8	9	10	11	12	13	14	15	16	17	18	19	20	21	22	23	24	25	26	27	28	29	30	31	32	33	34	35	36	37	38	39	40	41	42	43	44	45	46
Ground	A	H	A	H	A	H	H	A	H	A	A	H	H	A	A	H	A	H	H	A	H	A	H	H	A	H	H	A	H	A	A	H	A	H	A	H	A	H	A	A	A	H	A	H	A	H
Result	L	W	L	D	W	W	W	L	W	W	D	W	W	L	W	W	L	L	W	L	W	D	D	L	D	W	W	W	D	W	W	W	D	W	W	L	W	W	D	D	W	W	W	D	L	D
Position	22	13	19	19	10	5	4	5	4	3	4	2	2	2	2	1	2	5	5	5	5	5	6	6	6	6	6	6	6	5	5	3	4	3	3	3	3	3	3	3	2	2	2	2	3	3

Source: Reading FC; 11v11
A = Away; H = Home; W = Win; D = Draw; L = Loss

==== Results ====
12 August 2000 1	Millwall	2–0	Reading	Bermondsey
15:00 BST (UTC+1)	Cahill 5', 50'; Livermore (yellow card); Moody (yellow card)	Report	Rougier (yellow card); Parkinson (yellow card)	Stadium: The Den; Attendance: 11,043; Referee: G.Stretton

19 August 2000 2	Reading	2–0	Swindon Town	Reading
15:00 GMT (UTC)	Butler 17'; Caskey 47'; Gurney (yellow card)	Report	Davis (yellow card); Reeves (yellow card); Invincibile (yellow card)	Stadium: Madejski Stadium; Attendance: 14,134; Referee: M.Fletcher

26 August 2000 3	Northampton Town	2–0	Reading	Northampton
15:00 BST (UTC+1)	Forrester 32', 76'; Hunt (yellow card)	Report	Caskey (yellow card); Hodges (yellow card)	Stadium: Sixfields Stadium; Attendance: 5,728; Referee: Phil Joslin

29 August 2000 4	Reading	3–3	Stoke City	Reading
20:00 BST (UTC+1)	Butler 45'; Caskey 84' (pen.); Cureton 90'; Viveash (yellow card); Parkinson (yellow card); Cureton (yellow card)	Report	Hunter 17' (o.g.); Thordarson 22'; Fenton 75'; Mohan (yellow card); Guðjónsson (yellow card); Lightbourne (yellow card)	Stadium: Madejski Stadium; Attendance: 10,688; Referee: Paul Taylor

2 September 2000 5	Port Vale	0–1	Reading	Stoke-on-Trent
15:00 BST (UTC+1)		Report	Cureton 5'	Stadium: Vale Park; Attendance: 4,701; Referee: Steve Baines

9 September 2000 6	Reading	4–0	Brentford	Reading
15:00 GMT (UTC)	Cureton 19', 38', 69'; Caskey 45' (pen.) (yellow card); Gurney (yellow card); Parkinson (yellow card); Smith (yellow card)	Report	Javary (yellow card); Rowlands (yellow card); Mahon (yellow card); Pinamonte (yellow card)	Stadium: Madejski Stadium; Attendance: 10,222; Referee: Trevor Parkes

12 September 2000 7	Reading	5–0	Oldham Athletic	Reading
15:00 BST (UTC+1)	Butler 3'; Igoe 5', 43'; Hodges 49'; McIntyre 80'	Report		Stadium: Madejski Stadium; Attendance: 7,768; Referee: D.R.Crick

16 September 2000 8	Peterborough United	1–0	Reading	Peterborough
15:00 BST (UTC+1)	Cullen 89' (pen.); Hooper (yellow card)	Report	Hunter (red card) 89'; Caskey (yellow card); Cureton (yellow card); Butler (yellow card)	Stadium: London Road; Attendance: 5,767; Referee: C.R.Wilkes

23 September 2000 9	Reading	5–1	Swansea City	Reading
15:00 BST (UTC+1)	Cureton 29' (yellow card); Butler 53', 57', 88' (yellow card); Hodges 70'; Viveash (yellow card)	Report	Watkin 62'; Bound (yellow card); Thomas (yellow card); Roberts (yellow card)	Stadium: Madejski Stadium; Attendance: 11,003; Referee: Ray Olivier

30 September 2000 10	Rotherham United	1–3	Reading	Sheffield
15:00 BST (UTC+1)	Robins 28' (pen.); Wilsterman (yellow card); Scott (yellow card)	Report	Butler 3'; Cureton 49'; McIntyre 79'; Gurney (yellow card); Viveash (yellow card)	Stadium: Don Valley Stadium; Attendance: 4,288

6 October 2000 11	Wigan Athletic	1–1	Reading	Wigan
15:00 BST (UTC+1)	Bradshaw 11' de Zeeuw (yellow card); Roberts (yellow card)	Report	Butler 10'; Newman (yellow card)	Stadium: JJB Stadium; Attendance: 7,021; Referee: Graham Laws

14 October 2000 12	Reading	2–0	Wycombe Wanderers	Reading
15:00 BST (UTC+1)	Butler 59'; Viveash 73'; Newman (yellow card)	Report	Brown (yellow card) (yellow-red card) 64'; McCarthy (yellow card); Vinnicombe (yellow card)	Stadium: Madejski Stadium; Attendance: 15,443; Referee: Peter Walton

17 October 2000 13	Reading	4–1	Wrexham	Reading
15:00 GMT (UTC)	Butler 6', 43'; Caskey 21', 45'; Newman (yellow card)	Report	Faulconbridge 52'; Chalk (yellow card); Ferguson (yellow card); Sam (yellow card)	Stadium: Madejski Stadium; Attendance: 10,350; Referee: Mike Riley

21 October 2000 14	Bristol City	4–0	Reading	Bristol
15:00 GMT (UTC)	Peacock 9', 60' (yellow card); Murray 18'; Bell 30'; Carey (yellow card); Hulbert (yellow card)	Report	Hodges (yellow card)	Stadium: Ashton Gate; Attendance: 11,134; Referee: Paul Danson

24 October 2000 15	Bury	0–2	Reading	Bury
15:00 BST (UTC+1)	Reid (yellow card)	Report	Butler 54'; Cureton 60'; Hodges (yellow card)	Stadium: Gigg Lane; Attendance: 2,808; Referee: David Laws

28 October 2000 16	Reading	4–3	Oxford United	Reading
15:00 BST (UTC+1)	Caskey 28' (pen.); Cureton 60'; Rougier 78', 87'; Mackie (yellow card)	Report	Lilley 40'; Viveash 69' (o.g.); Richardson 73' (yellow card); McGowan (yellow card); Fear (yellow card); Anthrobus (yellow card)	Stadium: Madejski Stadium; Attendance: 16,022; Referee: Peter Jones

4 November 2000 17	Walsall	2–1	Reading	Walsall
15:00 GMT (UTC)	Matias 58'; Byfield 86'	Report	McIntyre 90'; Gurney (yellow card); Rougier (yellow card)	Stadium: Bescot Stadium; Attendance: 7,772; Referee: Howard Webb

11 November 2000 18	Reading	0–1	Colchester United	Reading
15:00 GMT (UTC)	Newman (yellow card); Cureton (yellow card)	Report	Johnson 38'	Stadium: Madejski Stadium; Attendance: 11,549; Referee: Matt Messias

2 December 2000 19	Reading	3–0	Cambridge United	Reading
15:00 GMT (UTC)	Viveash 1'; Parkinson 35'; Gurney 70' (yellow card); Robinson (yellow card); Parkinson (yellow card); Butler (yellow card)	Report		Stadium: Madejski Stadium; Attendance: 9,601; Referee: Barry Knight

16 December 2000 20	Notts County	3–2	Reading	Nottingham
15:00 GMT (UTC)	Allsopp 35', 89'; Stallard 43' (pen.); Fenton (yellow card); Stallard (yellow card)	Report	Richardson 45' (o.g.); Parkinson 64'	Stadium: Meadow Lane; Attendance: 5,106; Referee: T.Jones

23 December 2000 21	Reading	4–1	Luton Town	Reading
15:00 GMT (UTC)	Hunter 1'; Cureton 35', 80', 89'; Smith (yellow card)	Report	Nogan 69'; Whitbread (yellow card); McLaren (yellow card); Fraser (yellow card)	Stadium: Madejski Stadium; Attendance: 10,771; Referee: Steve Tomlin

26 December 2000 22	Bristol Rovers	2–2	Reading	Bristol
19:45 GMT (UTC)	Ellington 30'; Thomson 81'; Challis (yellow card) (yellow-red card) 90'; Hogg (red card) 90'; Culkin (yellow card); Mauge (yellow card); Jones (yellow card); Evans (yellow card)	Report	Smith 38'; Parkinson 44' (yellow card); Viveash (yellow card); Newman (yellow card); Butler (yellow card); Igoe (yellow card)	Stadium: Memorial Ground; Attendance: 8,029; Referee: Rob Styles

1 January 2001 23	Reading	1–1	Northampton Town	Reading
15:00 GMT (UTC)	Caskey 90'; Hunter (yellow card)	Report	Gabbiadini 87'; Sampson (yellow card); Hodge (yellow card)	Stadium: Madejski Stadium; Attendance: 10,599; Referee: Anthony Leake

6 January 2001 24	Reading	3–4	Millwall	Reading
15:00 GMT (UTC)	Igoe 65'; Caskey 76' (pen.); Cureton 90'	Report	Harris 17', 22', 50' (pen.) (yellow card); Newman 29' (o.g.); Livermore (yellow card); Cahill (yellow card); Reid (yellow card)	Stadium: Madejski Stadium; Attendance: 14,743; Referee: Mike Dean

13 January 2001 25	Stoke City	0–0	Reading	Stoke-on-Trent
15:00 GMT (UTC)	Kavanagh (yellow card)	Report	Viveash (yellow card); McIntyre (yellow card)	Stadium: Britannia Stadium; Attendance: 14,154; Referee: R.D.Furnandiz

20 January 2001 26	Reading	1–0	Bristol Rovers	Reading
15:00 GMT (UTC)	Cureton 42'; Newman (yellow card); McIntyre (yellow card)	Report		Stadium: Madejski Stadium; Attendance: 11,767; Referee: Graham Poll

3 February 2001 27	Reading	1–0	Port Vale	Reading
15:00 GMT (UTC)	Butler 78'; Newman (yellow card)	Report	Widdrington (yellow card)	Stadium: Madejski Stadium; Attendance: 9,026; Referee: M.North

10 February 2001 28	Brentford	1–2	Reading	Brentford
15:00 GMT (UTC)	McCammon 85'; Gibbs (yellow card); Owusu (yellow card)	Report	Parkinson 30'; Igoe 58'; Newman (yellow card)	Stadium: Griffin Park; Attendance: 7,550; Referee: R.D.Furnandiz

17 February 2001 29	Reading	1–1	Peterborough United	Reading
15:00 GMT (UTC)	Cureton 24'; Viveash (yellow card) (yellow-red card) 56'; Igoe (yellow card); McIntyre (yellow card)	Report	Lee 54'; Hooper (yellow card)	Stadium: Madejski Stadium; Attendance: 10,342; Referee: Mike Jones

20 February 2001 30	Oldham Athletic	0–2	Reading	Oldham
19:45 GMT (UTC)		Report	Butler 3' (yellow card); Cureton 45'; Whitbread (yellow card); Caskey (yellow card); Parkinson (yellow card)	Stadium: Boundary Park; Attendance: 4,160; Referee: Jeff Winter

24 February 2001 31	Swansea City	0–1	Reading	Swansea
15:00 GMT (UTC)		Report	Cureton 42'; Jones (yellow card)	Stadium: Vetch Field; Attendance: 5,073; Referee: Steve Dunn

3 March 2001 32	Reading	2–0	Rotherham United	Reading
20:00 GMT (UTC)	Harper 60'; Butler 80'	Report	Talbot (yellow card) (yellow-red card) 35'; Lee (yellow card) (yellow-red card) 90'; Scott (yellow card); Warne (yellow card)	Stadium: Madejski Stadium; Attendance: 13,103; Referee: G.Stretton

6 March 2001 33	Wycombe Wanderers	1–1	Reading	High Wycombe
15:00 GMT (UTC)	Lee 39'; Townsend (yellow card); Brown (yellow card)	Report	Igoe 87'; Caskey (yellow card); Newman (yellow card); Hodges (yellow card)	Stadium: Adams Park; Attendance: 6,788; Referee: Peter Jones

9 March 2001 34	Reading	1–0	Wigan Athletic	Reading
15:00 GMT (UTC)	McIntyre 69'; Parkinson (yellow card)	Report	McCulloch (yellow card); Sheridan (yellow card); Roberts (yellow card)	Stadium: Madejski Stadium; Attendance: 12,307; Referee: M.Fletcher

17 March 2001 35	Wrexham	1–2	Reading	Wrexham
15:00 GMT (UTC)	Trundle 69'	Report	Butler 12', 83'; Hunter (yellow card); McIntyre (yellow card)	Stadium: Racecourse Ground; Attendance: 5,080; Referee: M.J.Brandwood

23 March 2001 36	Reading	1–3	Bristol City	Reading
20:00 GMT (UTC)	Murty 9'	Report	Thorpe 45'; Peacock 54'; Matthews 71'	Stadium: Madejski Stadium; Attendance: 15,716; Referee: Paul Durkin

27 March 2001 37	Swindon Town	0–1	Reading	Swindon
19:45 BST (UTC+1)	Reeves (yellow card); S.Robinson (yellow card)	Report	Cureton 51' (yellow card); Butler (yellow card); McIntyre (yellow card)	Stadium: County Ground; Attendance: 9,674; Referee: David Elleray

31 March 2001 38	Reading	2–1	Notts County	Reading
15:00 BST (UTC+1)	Butler 55'; Cureton 74'; Viveash (yellow card); Whitbread (yellow card)	Report	Owers 81'	Stadium: Madejski Stadium; Attendance: 11,624; Referee: Trevor Parkes

3 April 2001 39	Luton Town	1–1	Reading	Luton
15:00 BST (UTC+1)	Harper 10' (o.g.); Taylor (yellow card); Mansell (yellow card)	Report	Butler 4'; Harper (yellow card)	Stadium: Kenilworth Road; Attendance: 6,132; Referee: Graham Poll

7 April 2001 40	Cambridge United	1–1	Reading	Cambridge
15:00 BST (UTC+1)	Wanless 83'; Joseph (yellow card)	Report	Cureton 33' (yellow card); Robinson (yellow card) (yellow-red card) 61'; Igoe (yellow card); Newman (yellow card)	Stadium: Abbey Stadium; Attendance: 4,745; Referee: Anthony Bates

10 April 2001 41	Bournemouth	1–2	Reading	Bournemouth
15:00 BST (UTC+1)	Defoe 3'	Report	Cureton 4'; Butler 9' (yellow card); Viveash (yellow card); Parkinson (yellow card)	Stadium: Dean Court; Attendance: 6,603; Referee: Bill Jordan

14 April 2001 42	Reading	4–1	Bury	Reading
15:00 BST (UTC+1)	Igoe 11'; Cureton 23'; Butler 55', 62'	Report	Cramb 8'; Cramb (red card) 49'; Halford (yellow card); Reid (yellow card)	Stadium: Madejski Stadium; Attendance: 16,829; Referee: Paul Rejer

17 April 2001 43	Oxford United	0–2	Reading	Oxford
15:00 GMT (UTC)		Report	Cureton 20'; Butler 71'; Caskey (yellow card)	Stadium: Manor Ground; Attendance: 6,886; Referee: S.J.Lodge

21 April 2001 44	Reading	2–2	Walsall	Reading
15:00 BST (UTC+1)	Cureton 15', 27'; Igoe (yellow card)	Report	Leitão 28' (yellow card); Barras 53' (yellow card); Bennett (yellow card)	Stadium: Madejski Stadium; Attendance: 16,710; Referee: Paul Robinson

28 April 2001 45	Colchester United	2–1	Reading	Colchester
15:00 BST (UTC+1)	Conlon 34'; Skelton 43' (pen.); Dunne (yellow card); Johnson (yellow card); Izzet (yellow card)	Report	Cureton 24'; Viveash (yellow card); Caskey (yellow card)	Stadium: Layer Road; Attendance: 5,010; Referee: Paul Danson

5 May 2001 46	Reading	3–3	Bournemouth	Reading
15:00 GMT (UTC)	Butler 26'; Caskey 72'; Forster 88'	Report	Elliott 4', 33'; Defoe 24'; Howe (yellow card); Jørgensen (yellow card)	Stadium: Madejski Stadium; Attendance: 20,589; Referee: Uriah Rennie

==== League table ====
Pos	Team	Pld	W	D	L	GF	GA	GD	Pts	Qualification or relegation
1	Millwall (C, P)	46	28	9	9	89	38	+51	93	Promotion to Football League First Division
2	Rotherham United (P)	46	27	10	9	79	55	+24	91	Promotion to Football League First Division
3	Reading	46	25	11	10	86	52	+34	86	Qualification for the Second Division play-offs
4	Walsall (O, P)	46	23	12	11	79	50	+29	81	Qualification for the Second Division play-offs
5	Stoke City	46	21	14	11	74	49	+25	77	Qualification for the Second Division play-offs

Rules for classification: 1) Points; 2) Goal difference; 3) Goals scored
(C) Champions; (O) Play-off winners; (P) Promoted

==== Play-offs ====
13 May 2001 First Leg	Wigan Athletic	0–0	Reading	Wigan
15:00 BST (UTC+1)	McGibbon (yellow card); Martínez (yellow card)	Report	Parkinson (yellow card); McIntyre (yellow card)	Stadium: JJB Stadium; Attendance: 12,638; Referee: R.Pearson

16 May 2001 Second Leg	Reading	2–1 (2–1 agg.)	Wigan Athletic	Reading
15:00 BST (UTC+1)	Butler 86' (yellow card); Forster 90'; Viveash (yellow card); McIntyre (yellow card)	Report	Nicholls 26' (yellow card); Haworth (yellow card)	Stadium: Madejski Stadium; Attendance: 22,034; Referee: David Laws

===== Final =====
27 May 2001	Walsall	3–2 (a.e.t.)	Reading	Cardiff
15:00 BST (UTC+1)	Goodman 48'; Rougier 107' (o.g.); Byfield 109'	Report	Cureton 31'; Butler 91'	Stadium: Millennium Stadium; Attendance: 50,496; Referee: Eddie Wolstenholme

Walsall	Reading

Walsall:
GK	1	(England) Jimmy Walker
DF	3	(England) Ian Brightwell
DF	15	(Spain) Zigor Aranalde
DF	25	(England) Tony Barras (yellow card)
DF	5	(England) Andy Tillson
MF	10	(England) Dean Keates
MF	27	(Spain) Pedro Matias
MF	4	(Scotland) Tom Bennett	(substituted off) 98'
MF	19	(Jamaica) Paul Hall	(substituted off) 98'
FW	9	(England) Don Goodman
FW	14	(Portugal) Jorge Leitão	(substituted off) 98'
Substitutes:
DF	21	(England) Matt Gadsby	(substituted on) 98'
GK	17	(England) Carl Emberson
MF	26	(Hungary) Gábor Bukrán	(substituted on) 98'
FW	11	(England) Brett Angell
FW	8	(England) Darren Byfield	(substituted on) 98'
Manager:
(England) Ray Graydon

Reading:
GK	1	(England) Phil Whitehead
DF	7	(Scotland) Graeme Murty
DF	3	(England) Matthew Robinson
DF	5	(England) Adi Viveash (yellow card)
DF	29	(Wales) Ady Williams	(substituted off) 105'
MF	40	(England) James Harper
MF	14	(England) Sammy Igoe	(substituted off) 66'
MF	16	(England) Phil Parkinson (yellow card)
FW	22	(Scotland) Jim McIntyre	(substituted off) 82'
FW	9	(England) Martin Butler
FW	12	(England) Jamie Cureton
Substitutes:
MF	37	(Trinidad and Tobago) Tony Rougier	(substituted on) 82'
DF	6	(England) Barry Hunter	(substituted on) 105'
GK	21	(Scotland) Scott Howie
FW	10	(England) Nicky Forster	(substituted on) 66'
MF	8	(England) Darren Caskey
Manager:
(England) Alan Pardew

=== FA Cup ===
18 November 2000 First Round	Reading	4–0	Grays Athletic	Reading
15:00 GMT (UTC)	Hodges 16'; Cureton 60'; Butler 72'; Jones 87'	Report		Stadium: Madejski Stadium; Attendance: 5,643; Referee: Paul Alcock

9 December 2000 Second Round	York City	2–2	Reading	York
15:00 GMT (UTC)	McNiven 56'; Mathie 73'; Hulme (yellow card) 82' (yellow-red card); Bower (yellow card); Edmondson (yellow card)	Report	Newman 48'; Butler 52'; Whitehead (yellow card)	Stadium: Bootham Crescent; Attendance: 2,926; Referee: Peter Walton

19 December 2000 Second Round Reply	Reading	1–3	York City	Reading
20:00 GMT (UTC)	Caskey 24'; Whitehead (yellow card); Viveash (yellow card); Rougier (yellow card)	Report	Agnew 30' (yellow card); Alcide 88'; Iwelumo 90'	Stadium: Madejski Stadium; Attendance: 6,968; Referee: Peter Walton

=== League Cup ===
22 August 2000 First Round 1st leg	Leyton Orient	1–1	Reading	Leyton
BST (UTC+1)	Brkovic 47'; Griffiths (yellow card)	Report	Cureton 37'	Stadium: Brisbane Road; Attendance: 2,316; Referee: Steve Tomlin

5 September 2000 First Round 2nd leg	Reading	0–2 (1–3 agg.)	Leyton Orient	Reading
BST (UTC+1)	Robinson (yellow card); Cureton (yellow card)	Report	Brkovic 51'; Christie 63'; Watts (yellow card) 90' (yellow-red card); C.Dorrian (yellow card); Griffiths (yellow card)	Stadium: Madejski Stadium; Attendance: 4,337; Referee: Mark Warren

=== League Trophy South ===
9 January 2001 Second Round	Hereford United	1–2	Reading	Hereford
GMT (UTC)	Williams 70'	Report	Cureton 36'; McIntyre 39'; Hunter (yellow card); Gray (yellow card)	Stadium: Edgar Street; Attendance: 1,693; Referee: Paul Rejer

30 January 2001 Quarter Final	Swansea City	1–0	Reading	Swansea
GMT (UTC)	Savarese 75'; Howard (yellow card)	Report	Murty (yellow card); Hunter (yellow card); Newman (yellow card); McIntyre (yellow card)	Stadium: Vetch Field; Attendance: 2,516; Referee: Ray Olivier

== Squad statistics ==
As of match played 27 May 2001

=== Appearances and goals ===
No.	Pos	Nat	Player	Total		Second Division		Playoffs		FA Cup		League Cup		League Trophy	
No.	Pos	Nat	Player	Apps	Goals	Apps	Goals	Apps	Goals	Apps	Goals	Apps	Goals	Apps	Goals
1	GK	(England) ENG	Phil Whitehead	54	0	46	0	3	0	3	0	2	0	0	0
3	DF	(England) ENG	Matthew Robinson	39	0	29+3	0	3	0	2	0	2	0	0	0
4	MF	(England) ENG	Keith Jones	28	1	18+5	0	1	0	3	1	0	0	1	0
5	DF	(England) ENG	Adi Viveash	50	2	40	2	3	0	3	0	2	0	2	0
6	DF	(Northern Ireland) NIR	Barry Hunter	29	1	21+2	1	1+1	0	0+1	0	1	0	2	0
7	DF	(England) ENG	Graeme Murty	26	1	18+5	1	1	0	0	0	0	0	2	0
8	MF	(England) ENG	Darren Caskey	49	10	35+8	9	1+1	0	1	1	1	0	2	0
9	FW	(England) ENG	Martin Butler	54	28	42+3	24	3	2	3	2	1+1	0	0+1	0
10	FW	(England) ENG	Nicky Forster	12	2	0+9	1	0+3	1	0	0	0	0	0	0
11	MF	(England) ENG	Lee Hodges	34	3	23+6	2	0	0	3	1	1	0	0+1	0
12	FW	(England) ENG	Jamie Cureton	53	30	37+6	26	3	1	2+1	1	2	1	2	1
14	MF	(England) ENG	Sammy Igoe	40	6	15+16	6	3	0	2	0	2	0	2	0
16	MF	(England) ENG	Phil Parkinson	52	4	44	4	3	0	3	0	1	0	1	0
17	MF	(England) ENG	Neil Smith	17	1	4+11	1	0	0	0+1	0	0+1	0	0	0
18	DF	(England) ENG	Andy Gurney	27	1	15+6	1	2	0	0+1	0	2	0	0+1	0
19	MF	(Republic of Ireland) IRL	Joe Gamble	3	0	0+1	0	0	0	0+1	0	0+1	0	0	0
21	GK	(Scotland) SCO	Scott Howie	2	0	0	0	0	0	0	0	0	0	2	0
22	FW	(Scotland) SCO	Jim McIntyre	40	5	25+8	4	3	0	0+1	0	0+1	0	2	1
23	DF	(England) ENG	John Mackie	16	0	7+3	0	0	0	3	0	1+1	0	0+1	0
24	FW	(England) ENG	Darius Henderson	6	0	0+4	0	0	0	0	0	1	0	0+1	0
25	DF	(England) ENG	Ricky Newman	44	1	37+2	0	0	0	3	1	1	0	1	0
29	DF	(Wales) WAL	Ady Williams	7	0	5	0	2	0	0	0	0	0	0	0
30	MF	(England) ENG	Alex Haddow	1	0	0+1	0	0	0	0	0	0	0	0	0
31	GK	(England) ENG	Jamie Ashdown	1	0	0+1	0	0	0	0	0	0	0	0	0
34	DF	(England) ENG	Adrian Whitbread	19	0	19	0	0	0	0	0	0	0	0	0
37	MF	(Trinidad and Tobago) TRI	Tony Rougier	38	2	14+17	2	0+2	0	1+1	0	1	0	2	0
40	MF	(England) ENG	James Harper	14	1	9+3	1	1+1	0	0	0	0	0	0	0
Players who appeared for Reading but left during the season:
13	FW	(England) ENG	Keith Scott	1	0	1	0	0	0	0	0	0	0	0	0
15	MF	(England) ENG	Sean Evers	1	0	0	0	0	0	0	0	1	0	0	0
26	DF	(Scotland) SCO	Stuart Gray	5	0	2+1	0	0	0	1	0	0	0	1	0

=== Goalscorers ===
Place	Position	Nation	Number	Name	Division Two	Playoffs	FA Cup	League Cup	League Trophy	Total
1	FW	(England)	12	Jamie Cureton	26	1	1	1	1	30
2	FW	(England)	9	Martin Butler	24	2	2	0	0	28
3	MF	(England)	8	Darren Caskey	9	0	1	0	0	10
4	MF	(England)	14	Sammy Igoe	6	0	0	0	0	6
5	FW	(Scotland)	22	Jim McIntyre	4	0	0	0	1	5
6	MF	(England)	16	Phil Parkinson	4	0	0	0	0	4
7	MF	(England)	11	Lee Hodges	2	0	1	0	0	3
8	MF	(Trinidad and Tobago)	37	Tony Rougier	2	0	0	0	0	2
8	DF	(England)	5	Adi Viveash	2	0	0	0	0	2
8	FW	(England)	10	Nicky Forster	1	1	0	0	0	2
11	DF	(England)	18	Andy Gurney	1	0	0	0	0	1
11	MF	(England)	40	James Harper	1	0	0	0	0	1
11	DF	(Northern Ireland)	6	Barry Hunter	1	0	0	0	0	1
11	DF	(England)	7	Graeme Murty	1	0	0	0	0	1
11	MF	(England)	17	Neil Smith	1	0	0	0	0	1
11	MF	(England)	4	Keith Jones	0	0	1	0	0	1
11	DF	(England)	25	Ricky Newman	0	0	1	0	0	1
11				Own goal	1	0	0	0	0	1
TOTALS					86	4	7	1	2	100

=== Clean sheets ===
Place	Position	Nation	Number	Name	Division Two	Playoffs	FA Cup	League Cup	League Trophy	Total
1	GK	(England)	1	Phil Whitehead	16	1	1	0	0	18
2	GK	(England)	31	Jamie Ashdown	1	0	0	0	0	1
TOTALS					16	1	1	0	0	18

Jamie Ashdown replaced the injured Phil Whitehead during the 5-0 victory over Oldham Athletic on 12 September 2000

=== Disciplinary record ===
Number	Nation	Position	Name	Division Two		Playoffs		FA Cup		League Cup		League Trophy		Total	
Number	Nation	Position	Name	Booked	Sent off (straight red)	Booked	Sent off (straight red)	Booked	Sent off (straight red)	Booked	Sent off (straight red)	Booked	Sent off (straight red)	Booked	Sent off (straight red)
1	(England)	GK	Phil Whitehead	0	0	0	0	2	0	0	0	0	0	2	0
3	(England)	DF	Matthew Robinson	3	1	0	0	0	0	1	0	0	0	4	1
4	(England)	MF	Keith Jones	1	0	0	0	0	0	0	0	0	0	1	0
5	(England)	DF	Adi Viveash	10	1	2	0	1	0	0	0	0	0	13	1
6	(Northern Ireland)	DF	Barry Hunter	2	1	0	0	0	0	0	0	2	0	4	1
7	(England)	DF	Graeme Murty	0	0	0	0	0	0	0	0	1	0	1	0
8	(England)	MF	Darren Caskey	7	0	0	0	0	0	0	0	0	0	7	0
9	(England)	FW	Martin Butler	7	0	1	0	0	0	0	0	0	0	8	0
11	(England)	MF	Lee Hodges	4	0	0	0	0	0	0	0	0	0	4	0
12	(England)	FW	Jamie Cureton	6	0	0	0	0	0	1	0	0	0	7	0
14	(England)	MF	Sammy Igoe	4	0	0	0	0	0	0	0	0	0	4	0
16	(England)	MF	Phil Parkinson	8	0	2	0	0	0	0	0	0	0	10	0
17	(England)	MF	Neil Smith	2	0	0	0	0	0	0	0	0	0	2	0
18	(England)	DF	Andy Gurney	5	0	0	0	0	0	0	0	0	0	5	0
22	(Scotland)	FW	Jim McIntyre	5	0	2	0	0	0	0	0	1	0	8	0
23	(England)	DF	John Mackie	1	0	0	0	0	0	0	0	0	0	1	0
25	(England)	DF	Ricky Newman	10	0	0	0	0	0	0	0	1	0	11	0
34	(England)	DF	Adrian Whitbread	2	0	0	0	0	0	0	0	0	0	2	0
37	(Trinidad and Tobago)	MF	Tony Rougier	2	0	0	0	1	0	0	0	0	0	3	0
40	(England)	MF	James Harper	1	0	0	0	0	0	0	0	0	0	1	0
Players away on loan:
Players who left Reading during the season:
26	(Scotland)	DF	Stuart Gray	0	0	0	0	0	0	0	0	1	0	0	0
Total				80	3	7	0	4	0	2	0	6	0	99	3
