= 2002–03 Reading F.C. season =

Reading
2002–03 season
- Chairman: Sir John Madejski
- Manager: Alan Pardew
- First Division: 4th (play-off semi-finals)
- FA Cup: Third Round vs Walsall
- League Cup: First Round vs Cambridge United
- Top goalscorer: League: Nicky Forster (15); All: Nicky Forster (16)
Home colours

The 2002–03 season was Reading's first season back in the First Division, since their promotion from the Second Division in 2002.

== Season review ==
See also Football League First Division 2002–03

== Squad ==
As of match played 14 May 2003

No.	Name	Nationality	Position	Date of birth (Age (Note: Age as of the end of the season))	Signed from	Signed in	Contract ends	Apps.	Goals
Goalkeepers
1	Phil Whitehead	(England)	GK	17 December 1969 (aged 33)	West Bromwich Albion	1999		108	0
21	Jamie Ashdown	(England)	GK	30 November 1980 (aged 22)	Academy	1998		5	0
31	Marcus Hahnemann	(United States)	GK	15 June 1972 (aged 30)	Fulham	2002		50	0
32	Jamie Young	(England) (Note: Jamie Young was born in Brisbane, Australia, and but qualified to represent England, represent England at U18, U19 and U20 level.)	GK	25 August 1985 (aged 17)	Academy	2002		0	0
Defenders
2	Graeme Murty	(England) (Note: Murty was born in Nunthorpe, England, but qualified to represent Scotland internationally through his parents and made his international debut for Scotland in 2004.)	DF	13 November 1974 (aged 28)	York City	1998		155	1
3	Nicky Shorey	(England)	DF	19 February 1981 (aged 22)	Leyton Orient	2001		86	2
5	Adi Viveash	(England)	DF	30 September 1969 (aged 33)	Walsall	2000	2003	91	4
6	John Mackie	(England)	DF	5 July 1976 (aged 26)	Sutton United	1999		75	2
8	Ady Williams	(Wales) (Note: Adrian Williams was born in Reading, England, but also qualified to represent Wales internationally, making his international debut for Wales in 1994.)	DF	16 August 1971 (aged 31)	Wolverhampton Wanderers	2000	2003		
26	Alex Smith	(England)	DF	15 February 1976 (aged 27)	Port Vale	2001		18	3
29	Steve Brown	(England)	DF	13 May 1972 (aged 31)	Charlton Athletic	2002		25	1
35	Ahmet Rifat	(England)	DF	3 January 1986 (aged 17)	Academy	2003		0	0
37	Peter Castle	(England)	DF	12 March 1987 (aged 16)	Academy	2003		1	0
Midfielders
4	Kevin Watson	(England)	MF	3 January 1974 (aged 29)	Rotherham United	2003		45	2
11	Andy Hughes	(England)	MF	2 January 1978 (aged 25)	Notts County	2001		89	15
14	Sammy Igoe	(England)	MF	30 September 1975 (aged 27)	Portsmouth	2000		105	7
15	James Harper	(England)	MF	9 November 1980 (aged 22)	Arsenal	2001		86	4
16	Glen Little	(England)	MF	15 October 1975 (aged 27)	on loan from Burnley	2003	2003	7	1
17	John Salako	(England) (Note: John Salako was born in Ibadan, Nigeria, but also qualified to represent England internationally, making his international debut for England in 1991.)	MF	11 February 1969 (aged 34)	Charlton Athletic	2001		78	10
19	Joe Gamble	(Republic of Ireland)	MF	14 January 1982 (aged 21)	Cork City	2000		13	0
23	Andre Boucaud	(England) (Note: Andre Boucaud was born in Enfield, England, and but chose to represent Trinidad and Tobago, qualifying through his parents. Boucaud represented Trinidad and Tobago 13 days after being released by Reading in 2004.)	MF	10 October 1984 (aged 18)	Academy	2002		0	0
25	Ricky Newman	(England)	MF	5 August 1970 (aged 32)	Millwall	2000		83	2
27	Steve Sidwell	(England)	MF	14 December 1982 (aged 20)	Arsenal	2003		15	2
28	Steve Warren	(England)	MF	27 September 1983 (aged 19)	Crystal Palace	2003		0	0
30	Luke Chadwick	(England)	MF	18 November 1980 (aged 22)	loan from Manchester United	2003	2003	17	1
34	Darren Campbell	(Scotland) (Note: Darren Campbell was born in Cambridge, England, but also qualified to represent Scotland internationally through his parents.Campbell represented the England U-17's in 2002 and then the Scotland U-17 team 2003.)	MF	16 April 1986 (aged 17)	Academy	2003		1	0
Forwards
7	Tony Rougier	(Trinidad and Tobago)	FW	17 July 1971 (aged 31)	Port Vale	2000		99	6
9	Martin Butler	(England)	FW	15 September 1974 (aged 28)	Cambridge United	2000		115	36
10	Nicky Forster	(England)	FW	8 September 1973 (aged 29)	Birmingham City	1999		147	47
12	Jamie Cureton	(England)	FW	28 August 1975 (aged 27)	Bristol Rovers	2000		127	55
20	Bas Savage	(England)	FW	7 January 1982 (aged 21)	Academy	2001		1	0
22	Nathan Tyson	(England)	FW	4 May 1982 (aged 21)	Academy	1999		32	1
24	Darius Henderson	(England)	FW	7 September 1981 (aged 21)	Academy	1999		82	15
Out on loan
Left during the season
16	Phil Parkinson	(England)	DF	1 December 1967 (aged 35)	Bury	1992			
18	Adrian Whitbread	(England)	DF	22 October 1971 (aged 31)	Portsmouth	2001		37	0
27	Ricky Allaway	(England)	DF	12 February 1983 (aged 20)	Academy	1999		0	0
29	Matthew Upson	(England)	DF	18 April 1979 (aged 24)	loan from Arsenal	2002	2002	15	1

=== Left club during season ===
Note: Flags indicate national team as defined under FIFA eligibility rules; some limited exceptions apply. Players may hold more than one non-FIFA nationality.

No.	Pos.	Nation	Player
16	MF	ENG	Phil Parkinson (to Colchester)
18	DF	ENG	Adrian Whitbread (Retired)

No.	Pos.	Nation	Player
27	DF	ENG	Ricky Allaway (Released)
29	DF	ENG	Matthew Upson (returned to Arsenal after loan)

== Transfers ==
=== In ===
Date	Position	Nationality	Name	From	Fee	Ref.
8 August 2002	GK	(United States)	Marcus Hahnemann	Fulham	Free	
19 December 2002	DF	(England)	Steve Brown	Charlton Athletic	Free	
20 January 2003	MF	(England)	Steve Sidwell	Arsenal	Undisclosed Fee	
20 March 2003			Mario Noto	Tottenham Hotspur	Free	

=== Out ===
Date	Position	Nationality	Name	To	Fee	Ref.
1 July 2002	DF	(England)	Matthew Robinson	Oxford United	Free	
9 August 2002	GK	(Australia)	Frank Talia	Wycombe Wanderers	Free	
16 August 2002	DF	(England)	Neil Smith	Stevenage	Free	
1 November 2002	DF	(England)	Ricky Allaway	Basingstoke Town	Free	
25 February 2003	MF	(England)	Phil Parkinson	Colchester United	Free	

=== Loans in ===
Date	Position	Nationality	Name	From	Until	Ref.
5 September 2002	DF	(England)	Matthew Upson	Arsenal	8 December 2002	
7 February 2003	MF	(England)	Luke Chadwick	Manchester United	19 March 2003	
27 March 2003	MF	(England)	Luke Chadwick	Manchester United	15 May 2003	
1 April 2003	MF	(England)	Glen Little	Burnley	15 May 2003	

=== Loans out ===
Date	Position	Nationality	Name	To	Until	Ref.
12 December 2002	DF	(England)	Alex Smith	Shrewsbury Town	4 May 2003	

=== Released ===
Date	Position	Nationality	Name	Joined	Date	Ref.
9 April 2003	DF	(England)	Adrian Whitbread	Retired		
2 June 2003	DF	(England)	Adi Viveash	Swindon Town		
2 June 2003		(England)	Steve Warren			
1 July 2003	DF	(England)	Alex Smith	Chester City	November 2003	

== Competitions ==
Competition	Started round	Final position / round	First match	Last match
First Division	—	4th	10 August 2002	4 May 2003
FL Cup	1st round	1st round	10 September 2002	10 September 2002
FA Cup	3rd round	3rd round	4 January 2003	14 January 2003

Updated to match played match played 4 May 2003
Source: Competitions

=== Division One ===
==== Results summary ====
Overall								Home						Away					
Pld	W	D	L	GF	GA	GD	Pts	W	D	L	GF	GA	GD	W	D	L	GF	GA	GD
46	25	4	17	61	46	+15	79	13	3	7	33	21	+12	12	1	10	28	25	+3

==== Results by round ====
Round	1	2	3	4	5	6	7	8	9	10	11	12	13	14	15	16	17	18	19	20	21	22	23	24	25	26	27	28	29	30	31	32	33	34	35	36	37	38	39	40	41	42	43	44	45	46
Ground	A	H	H	A	H	A	A	H	H	A	H	A	A	H	A	H	H	H	A	A	H	H	A	A	H	A	H	H	A	H	A	A	H	A	A	H	H	A	A	H	H	H	A	H	A	A
Result	L	W	L	L	W	W	D	L	L	W	D	W	W	W	L	W	W	W	W	W	D	L	L	L	W	L	D	L	W	W	W	W	W	L	W	L	W	L	W	L	W	W	L	W	W	L
Position	20	11	15	20	15	11	8	12	13	11	11	9	9	10	12	10	8	7	4	5	5	6	6	7	6	7	7	7	5	5	4	3	3	3	3	4	3	4	4	4	4	4	5	4	4	4

Source: Soccerbase; 11v11
A = Away; H = Home; W = Win; D = Draw; L = Loss

==== Fixtures and results ====
10 August 2002	Derby County	3–0	Reading	Pride Park
	Lee 60'; Ravanelli 62'; Christie 71'	Report		Attendance: 33,016

13 August 2002	Reading	2–1	Sheffield Wednesday	Madejski Stadium
	Cureton 47', 78'	Report	Sibon 18'; Quinn (yellow card) 89' (yellow-red card) 90'	Attendance: 13,638

17 August 2002	Reading	1–2	Coventry City	Madejski Stadium
	Cureton 12' (pen.)	Report	Davenport 74'; Bothroyd 81'	Attendance: 14,712

24 August 2002	Leicester City	2–1	Reading	Walkers Stadium
	Deane 3'; Dickov 4' (pen.)	Report	Cureton 20' (pen.)	Attendance: 22,978

27 August 2002	Reading	3–0	Burnley	Madejski Stadium
	Cureton 55', 90'; Butler 87'	Report		Attendance: 12,009

31 August 2002	Walsall	0–2	Reading	Bescot Stadium
	Martínez (red card) 84'	Report	Hughes 78', 90'	Attendance: 5,327

7 September 2002	Rotherham United	0–0	Reading	Don Valley Stadium
		Report		Attendance: 6,154

14 September 2002	Reading	0–1	Wimbledon	Madejski Stadium
		Report	McAnuff 90'	Attendance: 14,832

18 September 2002	Reading	0–2	Norwich City	Madejski Stadium
		Report	McVeigh 3'; Mulryne 5'	Attendance: 14,335

21 September 2002	Wolverhampton Wanderers	0–1	Reading	Molineux
		Report	Hughes 58'	Attendance: 25,560

28 September 2002	Reading	1–1	Stoke City	Madejski Stadium
	Rougier 11'	Report	Vandeurzen 39'	Attendance: 13,646

5 October 2002	Grimsby Town	0–3	Reading	Blundell Park
		Report	Hughes 15'; Forster 33'; Pouton 90' (o.g.)	Attendance: 5,582

19 October 2002	Reading	3–1	Ipswich Town	Madejski Stadium
	Forster 28', 40', 69'	Report	Ambrose 61'	Attendance: 19,524

26 October 2002	Preston North End	1–0	Reading	Deepdale
	Cresswell 22'	Report		Attendance: 13,021

29 October 2002	Reading	1–0	Bradford City	Madejski Stadium
	Shorey 70'	Report		Attendance: 12,110

2 November 2002	Reading	2–0	Millwall	Madejski Stadium
	Forster 5'; Hughes 90'	Report		Attendance: 13,081

9 October 2002	Gillingham	0–1	Reading	Priestfield Stadium
		Report	Rougier 82'	Attendance: 8,511

23 November 2002	Reading	1–0	Watford	Madejski Stadium
	Watson 61'	Report		Attendance: 17,465

26 November 2002	Crystal Palace	0–1	Reading	Selhurst Park
		Report	Forster 39'	Attendance: 15,712

29 November 2002	Brighton & Hove Albion	0–1	Reading	Withdean Stadium
		Report	Salako 22'	Attendance: 6,817

7 December 2002	Reading	0–0	Portsmouth	Madejski Stadium
		Report		Attendance: 23,462

14 December 2002	Reading	0–2	Sheffield United	Madejski Stadium
		Report	Harley 59'; Windass 76'	Attendance: 18,534

21 December 2002	Nottingham Forest	2–0	Reading	City Ground
	Johnson 4'; Harewood 67'	Report		Attendance: 25,831

26 December 2002	Coventry City	2–0	Reading	Highfield Road
	Hignett 39'; Partridge 52'	Report		Attendance: 19,526

28 December 2002	Reading	2–1	Derby County	Madejski Stadium
	Tyson 5'; Cureton 89'	Report	Burley 7' (pen.)	Attendance: 16,299

1 January 2003	Reading	Abandoned	Leicester City	Madejski Stadium
		Report
Note: Match abandoned at half-time due to waterlogged pitch with the score 0-0.

11 January 2003	Sheffield Wednesday	3–2	Reading	Hillsborough
	Quinn 52'; Sibon 69'; Johnston 71'	Report	Forster 9'; Butler 19'	Attendance: 17,715

18 January 2003	Reading	0–0	Walsall	Madejski Stadium
		Report		Attendance: 11,786

28 January 2003	Reading	1–3	Leicester City	Madejski Stadium
	Hughes 54'	Report	Dickov 17', 26' (pen.); Heath 34'	Attendance: 17,156

1 February 2003	Burnley	2–5	Reading	Turf Moor
	Moore 55'; West 90'	Report	Sidwell 37', 79'; Salako 45', 52'; Henderson 90'	Attendance: 14,420

10 February 2003	Reading	2–1	Gillingham	Madejski Stadium
	Chadwick 13'; Salako 87'	Report	Wallace 10'	Attendance: 11,030

15 February 2003	Millwall	0–2	Reading	The Den
		Report	Forster 45'; Henderson 83'	Attendance: 7,038

18 February 2003	Sheffield United	1–3	Reading	Bramall Lane
	Brown 4'	Report	Forster 36', 80'; Williams 74'	Attendance: 16,884

22 February 2003	Reading	3–0	Rotherham United	Madejski Stadium
	Harper 15'; Hughes 32'; Forster 40'	Report		Attendance: 14,816

1 March 2003	Wimbledon	2–0	Reading	Selhurst Park
	Francis 31'; Tapp 85'	Report		Attendance: 3,869

5 March 2003	Norwich City	0–1	Reading	Carrow Road
		Report	Kenton 75' (o.g.)	Attendance: 18,970

12 March 2003	Reading	0–1	Wolverhampton Wanderers	Madejski Stadium
		Report	Miller 44'	Attendance: 19,731

15 March 2003	Reading	2–1	Crystal Palace	Madejski Stadium
	Brown 66'; Harper 90'	Report	Johnson 76'	Attendance: 18,063

18 March 2003	Ipswich Town	3–1	Reading	Portman Road
	Gaardsoe 1'; Magilton 31'; Holland 70'	Report	Forster 16'	Attendance: 24,108

22 March 2003	Bradford City	0–1	Reading	Bradford & Bingley Stadium
		Report	Forster 66'	Attendance: 11,385

4 April 2003	Reading	1–2	Brighton & Hove Albion	Madejski Stadium
	Cureton 83'	Report	Brooker 17'; Kitson 77'	Attendance: 16,133

15 April 2003	Reading	5–1	Preston North End	Madejski Stadium
	Forster 29', 41', 57'; Shorey 56' (pen.); Henderson 90'	Report	Jackson (yellow card) 2' (yellow-red card) 27'; Lucas (red card) 55'; Mears 83'	Attendance: 14,012

18 April 2003	Reading	1–0	Nottingham Forest	Madejski Stadium
	Hughes 74'	Report		Attendance: 21,612

21 April 2003	Portsmouth	3–0	Reading	Fratton Park
	Pericard 19', 45'; Todorov 71'	Report		Attendance: 19,535

26 April 2003	Reading	2–1	Grimsby Town	Madejski Stadium
	Little 2'; Hughes 22'	Report	Keane 90'	Attendance: 20,273

30 April 2003	Watford	0–3	Reading	Vicarage Road
		Report	Rougier 27'; Henderson 70'; Cureton 90'	Attendance: 11,814

4 May 2003	Stoke City	1–0	Reading	Britannia Stadium
	Akinbiyi 55'	Report		Attendance: 20,477

==== Playoffs ====
===== Semi-finals =====
10 May 2003	Wolverhampton Wanderers	2–1	Reading	Molineux
17:30	Newton 74'; Naylor 82'	Report	Forster 25'; Tyson (red card) 90+2'	Attendance: 27,678; Referee: A Kaye

14 May 2003	Reading	0–1	Wolverhampton Wanderers	Madejski Stadium
19:45		Report	Rae 82'	Attendance: 24,060; Referee: Howard Webb

Reading lost 3–1 on aggregate

==== League table ====
Pos	Team	Pld	W	D	L	GF	GA	GD	Pts	Promotion or relegation
2	Leicester City (P)	46	26	14	6	73	40	+33	92	Promotion to 2003–04 FA Premier League
3	Sheffield United	46	23	11	12	72	52	+20	80	Qualification for First Division Playoffs
4	Reading	46	25	4	17	61	46	+15	79	Qualification for First Division Playoffs
5	Wolverhampton Wanderers (O, P)	46	20	16	10	81	44	+37	76	Qualification for First Division Playoffs
6	Nottingham Forest	46	20	14	12	82	50	+32	74	Qualification for First Division Playoffs

Updated to match(es) played on 11 May 2003. Source: Soccerway
Rules for classification: 1) points; 2) goal difference; 3) number of goals scored.
(O) Play-off winners; (P) Promoted

=== League Cup ===
10 September 2002	Cambridge United	3–1	Reading	Abbey Stadium
	Duncan 24'; Kitson 39'; Tudor 71'	Report	Upson 89'	Attendance: 2,696

=== FA Cup ===
4 January 2003; Third round	Walsall	0–0	Reading	Bescot Stadium
15:00		Report		Attendance: 5,987

14 January 2003; Third round reply	Reading	1–1 (a.e.t.) (1–4 p)	Walsall	Madejski Stadium
20:00	Aranalde 32' (o.g.)	Report	Wrack 7'	Attendance: 8,767
	Penalties
	Butler (penalty missed); Cureton (penalty scored); Harper (penalty missed)		(penalty scored) Aranalde; (penalty scored) Zdrilic; (penalty scored) Simpson; (penalty scored) Bazeley

== First team statistics ==
=== Appearances and goals ===
As of match played 14 May 2003

No.	Pos	Nat	Player	Total		First Division		Play-offs		FA Cup		League Cup	
No.	Pos	Nat	Player	Apps	Goals	Apps	Goals	Apps	Goals	Apps	Goals	Apps	Goals
1	GK	(England) ENG	Phil Whitehead	4	0	4	0	0	0	0	0	0	0
2	DF	(Scotland) SCO	Graeme Murty	48	0	43+1	0	2	0	2	0	0	0
3	DF	(England) ENG	Nicky Shorey	48	2	43	2	2	0	2	0	1	0
4	MF	(England) ENG	Kevin Watson	33	1	24+8	1	0+1	0	0	0	0	0
5	DF	(England) ENG	Adi Viveash	5	0	4+1	0	0	0	0	0	0	0
6	DF	(England) ENG	John Mackie	28	0	20+5	0	0	0	2	0	1	0
7	FW	(Trinidad and Tobago) TRI	Tony Rougier	22	3	13+7	3	0+1	0	0	0	0+1	0
8	DF	(Wales) WAL	Ady Williams	41	1	38	1	2	0	0	0	0+1	0
9	FW	(England) ENG	Martin Butler	24	2	12+9	2	0	0	2	0	1	0
10	FW	(England) ENG	Nicky Forster	44	17	35+5	16	1	1	1+1	0	1	0
11	MF	(England) ENG	Andy Hughes	47	9	41+2	9	2	0	0+1	0	1	0
12	FW	(England) ENG	Jamie Cureton	32	9	13+14	9	1+1	0	1+1	0	1	0
14	FW	(England) ENG	Sammy Igoe	18	0	8+7	0	0	0	2	0	0+1	0
15	MF	(England) ENG	James Harper	40	2	34+2	2	2	0	2	0	0	0
16	MF	(England) ENG	Glenn Little	7	1	6	1	1	0	0	0	0	0
17	MF	(England) ENG	John Salako	46	4	33+10	4	0	0	0+2	0	1	0
21	GK	(England) ENG	Jamie Ashdown	1	0	1	0	0	0	0	0	0	0
22	FW	(England) ENG	Nathan Tyson	27	1	9+14	1	0+1	0	2	0	0+1	0
24	FW	(England) ENG	Darius Henderson	25	4	1+21	4	2	0	0+1	0	0	0
25	MF	(England) ENG	Ricky Newman	32	0	21+7	0	2	0	1	0	0+1	0
26	DF	(England) ENG	Alex Smith	1	0	0+1	0	0	0	0	0	0	0
27	MF	(England) ENG	Steve Sidwell	15	2	13	2	2	0	0	0	0	0
29	DF	(England) ENG	Steve Brown	25	1	21	1	2	0	2	0	0	0
30	MF	(England) ENG	Luke Chadwick	17	1	15	1	1+1	0	0	0	0	0
31	GK	(United States) USA	Marcus Hahnemann	46	0	41	0	2	0	2	0	1	0
34	MF	(Scotland) SCO	Darren Campbell	1	0	0+1	0	0	0	0	0	0	0
37	DF	(England) ENG	Peter Castle	1	0	0+1	0	0	0	0	0	0	0
Players who appeared for Reading but left during the season:
16	MF	(England) ENG	Phil Parkinson	7	0	0+6	0	0	0	0	0	1	0
29	DF	(England) ENG	Matthew Upson	15	1	13+1	0	0	0	0	0	1	1

=== Top scorers ===
Place	Position	Nation	Number	Name	First Division	Play Off	FA Cup	League Cup	Total
1	FW	(England)	10	Nicky Forster	16	1	0	0	17
2	FW	(England)	12	Jamie Cureton	9	0	0	0	9
2	MF	(England)	11	Andy Hughes	9	0	0	0	9
4	MF	(England)	17	John Salako	4	0	0	0	4
4	FW	(England)	24	Darius Henderson	4	0	0	0	4
6	FW	(Trinidad and Tobago)	7	Tony Rougier	3	0	0	0	3
7	MF	(England)	15	James Harper	2	0	0	0	2
7	DF	(England)	3	Nicky Shorey	2	0	0	0	2
7	FW	(England)	9	Martin Butler	2	0	0	0	2
7	MF	(England)	27	Steve Sidwell	2	0	0	0	2
11	DF	(England)	29	Steve Brown	1	0	0	0	1
11	MF	(England)	4	Kevin Watson	1	0	0	0	1
11	FW	(England)	22	Nathan Tyson	1	0	0	0	1
11	MF	(England)	30	Luke Chadwick	1	0	0	0	1
11	DF	(Wales)	8	Ady Williams	1	0	0	0	1
11	MF	(England)	16	Glen Little	1	0	0	0	1
11	DF	(England)	29	Matthew Upson	0	0	0	1	1
				Totals	58	1	0	1	60

=== Disciplinary record ===
Number	Nation	Position	Name	First Division		Play Off		FA Cup		League Cup		Total	
Number	Nation	Position	Name	Booked	Sent off (straight red)	Booked	Sent off (straight red)	Booked	Sent off (straight red)	Booked	Sent off (straight red)	Booked	Sent off (straight red)
25	(England)	MF	Ricky Newman	10	0	0	0	1	0	0	0	11	0
6	(England)	DF	John Mackie	6	1	0	0	1	0	0	0	7	1
29	(England)	DF	Steve Brown	5	0	1	0	2	0	0	0	8	0
8	(Wales)	DF	Ady Williams	6	0	0	0	0	0	0	0	6	0
7	(Trinidad and Tobago)	FW	Tony Rougier	5	0	0	0	0	0	0	0	5	0
4	(England)	MF	Kevin Watson	5	0	0	0	0	0	0	0	5	0
14	(England)	MF	Sammy Igoe	4	0	0	0	0	0	0	0	4	0
10	(England)	FW	Nicky Forster	3	0	0	0	0	0	0	0	3	0
11	(England)	MF	Andy Hughes	2	0	0	0	0	0	1	0	3	0
3	(England)	DF	Nicky Shorey	3	0	0	0	0	0	0	0	3	0
27	(England)	MF	Steve Sidwell	1	0	2	0	0	0	0	0	3	0
29	(England)	DF	Matthew Upson	3	0	0	0	0	0	0	0	3	0
22	(England)	FW	Nathan Tyson	1	0	0	1	0	0	0	0	1	1
9	(England)	FW	Martin Butler	2	0	0	0	0	0	0	0	2	0
2	(Scotland)	DF	Graeme Murty	2	0	0	0	0	0	0	0	2	0
17	(England)	MF	John Salako	2	0	0	0	0	0	0	0	2	0
5	(England)	DF	Adi Viveash	0	1	0	0	0	0	0	0	0	1
15	(England)	MF	James Harper	0	0	0	0	1	0	0	0	1	0
24	(England)	FW	Darius Henderson	1	0	0	0	0	0	0	0	1	0
			Totals	62	2	3	1	4	0	1	0	70	4

== Team kit ==
Reading's kit for the 2002–03 was manufactured by Kit@, and the main sponsor was Westcoast.

2002–03 home colours	2002–03 away colours
