= 2003–04 Reading F.C. season =

Reading
2003–04 season
- Chairman: John Madejski
- Manager: Alan Pardew (until 10 September); Kevin Dillon (caretaker, 11 September - 9 October); Steve Coppell (from 9 October)
- First Division: 9th
- FA Cup: Third Round vs Preston North End
- League Cup: Fourth Round vs Chelsea
- Top goalscorer: League: Shaun Goater (12); All: Shaun Goater (14)
- Average home league attendance: 15,095
Home colours

The 2003–04 season was Reading's second consecutive season in the First Division, after promotion from the Second Division in 2002.

== Season events ==
At the start of September Reading rejected an approach from West Ham United for Manager Alan Pardew, with Reading subsequently rejecting Pardew's resignation on 10 September, before a High Court ruled in Pardew's favour on 18 September, allowing him to take over as Manager of West Ham United.

On 9 October, Reading appointed Steve Coppell as their new manager.

== Squad ==
As of match played 9 May 2004

No.	Name	Nationality	Position	Date of birth (Age (Note: Age as of the end of the season))	Signed from	Signed in	Contract ends	Apps.	Goals
Goalkeepers
1	Marcus Hahnemann	(United States)	GK	15 June 1972 (aged 31)	Fulham	2002		92	0
21	Jamie Ashdown	(England)	GK	30 November 1980 (aged 23)	Academy	1998		15	0
22	Kelvin Jack	(Trinidad and Tobago)	GK	29 April 1976 (aged 28)	Unattached	2004	2004	0	0
26	Jamie Young	(England) (Note: Jamie Young was born in Brisbane, Australia, and but qualified to represent England, represent England at U18, U19 and U20 level.)	GK	25 August 1985 (aged 18)	Youth team	2002		1	0
Defenders
2	Graeme Murty	(Scotland) (Note: Graeme Murty was born in Nunthorpe, England, but qualified to represent Scotland internationally through his parents and made his international debut for Scotland in 2004.)	DF	13 November 1974 (aged 29)	York City	1998		197	1
3	Nicky Shorey	(England)	DF	19 February 1981 (aged 23)	Leyton Orient	2001		127	4
5	Steve Brown	(England)	DF	13 May 1972 (aged 31)	Charlton Athletic	2002		47	1
6	Dean Gordon	(England)	DF	10 February 1973 (aged 31)	on loan from Coventry City	2004	2004	3	0
8	Ady Williams	(Wales) (Note: Ady Williams was born in Reading, England, but also qualified to represent Wales internationally, making his international debut for Wales in 1994.)	DF	16 August 1971 (aged 32)	Wolverhampton Wanderers	2000			
16	Ívar Ingimarsson	(Iceland)	DF	20 August 1977 (aged 26)	Wolverhampton Wanderers	2003	2006	28	1
35	Ahmet Rifat	(England)	DF	3 January 1986 (aged 18)	Academy	2003		0	0
37	Peter Castle	(England)	DF	12 March 1987 (aged 17)	Academy	2003		1	0
Midfielders
4	Kevin Watson	(England)	MF	3 January 1974 (aged 30)	Rotherham United	2003		70	2
11	Andy Hughes	(England)	MF	2 January 1978 (aged 26)	Notts County	2001		137	13
14	Steve Sidwell	(England)	MF	14 December 1982 (aged 21)	Arsenal	2003		63	11
15	James Harper	(England)	MF	9 November 1980 (aged 23)	Arsenal	2001		129	5
17	John Salako	(England) (Note: John Salako was born in Ibadan, Nigeria, but also qualified to represent England internationally, making his international debut for England in 1991.)	MF	11 February 1969 (aged 35)	Charlton Athletic	2001		121	14
18	Andre Boucaud	(England) (Note: Andre Boucaud was born in Enfield, England, and but chose to represent Trinidad and Tobago, qualifying through his parents. Boucaud represented Trinidad and Tobago 13 days after being released by Reading in 2004.)	MF	10 October 1984 (aged 19)	Academy	2002		0	0
19	Joe Gamble	(Republic of Ireland)	MF	14 January 1982 (aged 22)	Cork City	2000		13	0
25	Ricky Newman	(England)	MF	5 August 1970 (aged 33)	Millwall	2000		118	2
27	Darren Campbell	(Scotland) (Note: Darren Campbell was born in Cambridge, England, but also qualified to represent Scotland internationally through his parents.Campbell represented the England U-17's in 2002 and then the Scotland U-17 team 2003.)	MF	16 April 1986 (aged 18)	Academy	2003		1	0
30	Omar Daley	(Jamaica)	MF	25 April 1981 (aged 23)	on loan from Portmore United	2003	2004	7	0
31	Mark Uliano	(United States)	MF			2003		0	0
32	Louie Soares	(England) (Note: Louie Soares was born in Reading, England, and but chose to represent Barbados, qualifying through his parents. Soares went on to represent Barbados in 2007.)	MF	8 January 1985 (aged 19)	Academy	2003		0	0
Forwards
9	Shaun Goater	(Bermuda)	FW	25 February 1970 (aged 34)	Manchester City	2003	2006	38	14
10	Nicky Forster	(England)	FW	8 September 1973 (aged 30)	Birmingham City	1999		181	58
12	Dave Kitson	(England)	FW	21 January 1980 (aged 24)	Cambridge United	2003		17	5
20	Bas Savage	(England)	FW	7 January 1982 (aged 22)	Academy	2001		18	0
23	Dean Morgan	(England)	FW	3 October 1983 (aged 20)	Colchester United	2003		15	1
29	Andre Fashanu	(England)	FW	14 May 1984 (aged 19)	Academy	2003		0	0
31	Lloyd Owusu	(England) (Note: Lloyd Owusu was born in Slough, England, but qualified to represent Ghana internationally through his parents and made his international debut for Ghana in 2005.)	FW	12 December 1976 (aged 27)	Sheffield Wednesday	2004		16	4
Out on loan
Left during the season
6	John Mackie	(England)	DF	5 July 1976 (aged 27)	Sutton United	1999		85	3
7	Scott Murray	(Scotland)	MF	26 May 1974 (aged 29)	Bristol City	2004		40	5
16	Martin Butler	(England)	FW	15 September 1974 (aged 29)	Cambridge United	2000		118	36
22	Nathan Tyson	(England)	FW	4 May 1982 (aged 22)	Academy	1999		41	1
24	Darius Henderson	(England)	FW	7 September 1981 (aged 22)	Academy	1999		83	15
24	Paul Brooker	(England)	MF	25 November 1976 (aged 27)	on loan from Leicester City	2003	2004	11	0

=== Left club during season ===
Note: Flags indicate national team as defined under FIFA eligibility rules; some limited exceptions apply. Players may hold more than one non-FIFA nationality.

No.	Pos.	Nation	Player
6	DF	ENG	John Mackie (to Leyton Orient)
7	MF	SCO	Scott Murray (to Bristol City)
16	FW	ENG	Martin Butler (to Rotherham United)

No.	Pos.	Nation	Player
22	FW	ENG	Nathan Tyson (to Wycombe Wanderers)
24	FW	ENG	Darius Henderson (to Gillingham)
24	MF	ENG	Paul Brooker (loan return to Leicester City)

== Transfers ==
=== In ===
Date	Position	Nationality	Name	From	Fee	Ref.
8 July 2003	MF	(Scotland)	Scott Murray	Bristol City	£650,000	
1 August 2003	FW	(Bermuda)	Shaun Goater	Manchester City	£500,000	
23 October 2003	DF	(Iceland)	Ívar Ingimarsson	Wolverhampton Wanderers	£175,000	
27 November 2003	FW	(England)	Dean Morgan	Colchester United	Free	
26 December 2003	FW	(England)	Dave Kitson	Cambridge United	£150,000	
24 March 2004	GK	(Trinidad and Tobago)	Kelvin Jack	Unattached	Free	
11 March 2004	FW	(England)	Lloyd Owusu	Sheffield Wednesday	Free	

=== Loan in ===
Start date	Position	Nationality	Name	From	End date	Ref.
21 August 2003	MF	(Jamaica)	Omar Daley	Portmore United	10 May 2004	
23 December 2003	FW	(Ghana)	Lloyd Owusu	Sheffield Wednesday	11 March 2004	
19 November 2003	FW	(England)	Paul Brooker	Leicester City	27 March 2004	
23 March 2004	DF	(England)	Dean Gordon	Coventry City	End of season	

=== Out ===
Date	Position	Nationality	Name	To	Fee	Ref.
1 July 2003	MF	(England)	Sammy Igoe	Swindon Town	Free	
5 July 2003	FW	(England)	Jamie Cureton	Busan IPark	Free	
4 August 2003	GK	(England)	Phil Whitehead	Tamworth	Free	
15 August 2003	MF	(Trinidad and Tobago)	Tony Rougier	Brentford	Free	
29 August 2003	FW	(England)	Martin Butler	Rotherham United	£150,000	
2 January 2004	FW	(England)	Darius Henderson	Gillingham	Nominal	
2 January 2004	DF	(England)	John Mackie	Leyton Orient	Free	
12 March 2004	FW	(England)	Nathan Tyson	Wycombe Wanderers	Nominal	
25 March 2004	MF	(Scotland)	Scott Murray	Bristol City		

=== Released ===
Date	Position	Nationality	Name	Joined	Date	Ref
10 May 2004	MF	(Republic of Ireland)	Joe Gamble	Cork City		
10 May 2004	MF	(England)	Andre Boucaud	Peterborough United	14 May 2004	
30 June 2004	GK	(England)	Jamie Ashdown	Portsmouth		
30 June 2004	DF	(England)	Steve Brown	Retired		
30 June 2004	MF	(England)	Kevin Watson	Colchester United		
30 June 2004	MF	(England)	John Salako	Brentford		

== Competitions ==
=== Overview ===
Competition	First match	Last match	Starting round	Final position	Record							
Competition	First match	Last match	Starting round	Final position	Pld	W	D	L	GF	GA	GD	Win %
First Division	9 August 2003	9 May 2004	Matchday 1	9th	46	20	10	16	55	57	−2	43.48
FA Cup	3 January 2004	13 January 2004	Third round	Third round	2	0	1	1	4	5	−1	0.00
League Cup	13 August 2003	3 December 2003	First round	Fourth round	4	3	0	1	7	3	+4	75.00
Total					52	23	11	18	66	65	+1	44.23

Last updated: 9 May 2004
Source: Competitions

=== First Division ===
==== Results summary ====
Overall								Home						Away					
Pld	W	D	L	GF	GA	GD	Pts	W	D	L	GF	GA	GD	W	D	L	GF	GA	GD
46	20	10	16	55	57	−2	70	11	6	6	29	25	+4	9	4	10	26	32	−6

==== Results ====
9 August 2003 1	Ipswich Town	1–1	Reading	Portman Road
	Miller 90' (pen.)	Report	Sidwell 59'; Shorey (red card) 78'	Attendance: 24,830

16 August 2003 2	Reading	3–0	Nottingham Forest	Madejski Stadium
	Sidwell 49'; Murray 59'; Goater 79'	Report		Attendance: 16,833

23 August 2003 3	Derby County	2–3	Reading	Pride Park
	Taylor 7' (pen.); Svensson 81'	Report	Goater 3'; Murray 30', 36'	Attendance: 18,970

25 August 2003 4	Reading	0–0	Rotherham United	Madejski Stadium
		Report		Attendance: 14,047

30 August 2003 5	Wimbledon	0–3	Reading	Selhurst Park
		Report	Goater 12', 59'; Hughes 53'	Attendance: 2,066

13 September 2003 6	West Ham United	1–0	Reading	Upton Park
	Dailly 17'	Report		Attendance: 32,634

16 September 2003 7	Reading	2–1	Cardiff City	Madejski Stadium
	Forster 62'; Sidwell 79'	Report	Thorne 12'	Attendance: 15,810

20 September 2003 8	Reading	1–2	Coventry City	Madejski Stadium
	Forster 21'	Report	Adebola 35'; Morrell 76'	Attendance: 15,371

27 September 2003 9	Sunderland	2–0	Reading	Stadium of Light
	Arca 28'; Oster 32'	Report		Attendance: 22,420

30 September 2003 10	Norwich City	2–1	Reading	Carrow Road
	Huckerby 17'; McVeigh 87'	Report	Forster 25'	Attendance: 16,387

4 October 2003 11	Reading	2–2	Bradford City	Madejski Stadium
	Sidwell 5'; Hughes 78'	Report	Evans 44'; Gray 55'	Attendance: 12,594

14 October 2003 12	Reading	2–1	Gillingham	Madejski Stadium
	Murray 54'; Sidwell 85'	Report	King 73'	Attendance: 13,011

18 October 2003 13	Reading	3–2	Preston North End	Madejski Stadium
	Goater 39' (pen.); Mackie 82'; Forster 90'	Report	Fuller 20'; Alexander 53' (pen.)	Attendance: 13,130

21 October 2003 14	Reading	0–1	Walsall	Madejski Stadium
		Report	Samways 4'	Attendance: 11,225

24 October 2003 15	Sheffield United	1–2	Reading	Bramall Lane
	Ward 10'	Report	Williams 7'; Forster 43'	Attendance: 20,651

1 November 2003 16	Crewe Alexandra	1–0	Reading	Alexandra Stadium
	Jones 15'	Report		Attendance: 7,091

8 November 2003 17	Reading	1–0	Wigan Athletic	Madejski Stadium
	Hughes 69'	Report	Filan (red card) 90'	Attendance: 13,819

15 November 2003 18	Reading	1–0	Millwall	Madejski Stadium
	Salako 23'	Report		Attendance: 14,090

22 November 2003 19	West Bromwich Albion	0–0	Reading	The Hawthorns
		Report		Attendance: 22,839

25 November 2003 20	Burnley	3–0	Reading	Turf Moor
	Blake 5', 55'; Chaplow 48'	Report		Attendance: 9,473

29 November 2003 21	Reading	2–1	Watford	Madejski Stadium
	Forster 58'; Sidwell 88'	Report	Cook 60'	Attendance: 14,521

6 December 2003 22	Wigan Athletic	0–2	Reading	DW Stadium
		Report	Forster 55', 89'	Attendance: 7,512

13 December 2003 23	Stoke City	3–0	Reading	Britannia Stadium
	Hoekstra 18', 26', 87' (pen.)	Report		Attendance: 11,212

20 December 2003 24	Reading	0–3	Crystal Palace	Madejski Stadium
		Report	Johnson 40', 90'; Routledge 43'	Attendance: 12,743

26 December 2003 25	Reading	0–3	Wimbledon	Madejski Stadium
		Report	Small 8'; Lewington 22'; McAnuff 80'	Attendance: 14,486

28 December 2003 26	Walsall	1–1	Reading	Bescot Stadium
	Leitao 31'	Report	Shorey 71'	Attendance: 8,089

10 January 2004 27	Reading	1–1	Ipswich Town	Madejski Stadium
	Owusu 62'	Report	McGreal 72'	Attendance: 17,362

17 January 2004 28	Nottingham Forest	0–1	Reading	City Ground
		Report	Murray 41'	Attendance: 23,116

31 January 2004 29	Reading	3–1	Derby County	Madejski Stadium
	Goater 2'; Sidwell 41'	Report	Johnson 59'	Attendance: 14,382

7 February 2004 30	Rotherham United	5–1	Reading	Millmoor
	Proctor 24' (pen.), 79'; Monkhouse 36'; Butler 47'; Barker 90'	Report	Goater 20' (pen.)	Attendance: 6,405

21 February 2004 31	Gillingham	0–1	Reading	Priestfield Stadium
		Report	Goater 9'	Attendance: 8,600

24 February 2004 32	Reading	2–2	Burnley	Madejski Stadium
	Owusu 19'; Harper 90'	Report	Moore 23'; May 67'	Attendance: 10,543

28 February 2004 33	Reading	2–1	Sheffield United	Madejski Stadium
	Shorey 25'; Goater 33' (pen.)	Report	Gray 10'	Attendance: 15,545

2 March 2004 34	Preston North End	2–1	Reading	Deepdale
	Healy 35', 89'	Report	Salako 82'	Attendance: 11,745

6 March 2004 35	Crystal Palace	2–2	Reading	Selhurst Park
	Freedman 33'; Johnson 44'	Report	Owusu 15', 56'	Attendance: 17,853

13 March 2004 36	Reading	0–0	Stoke City	Madejski Stadium
		Report		Attendance: 14,132

16 March 2004 37	Cardiff City	2–3	Reading	Ninian Park
	Earnshaw 41'; Bullock 72'	Report	Ingimarsson 39'; Kitson 45'; Morgan 90'	Attendance: 14,051

20 March 2004 38	Reading	0–2	Sunderland	Madejski Stadium
		Report	Byfield 73'; Smith 74'	Attendance: 18,019

27 March 2004 39	Coventry City	1–2	Reading	Highfield Road
	McSheffrey 66'	Report	Salako 10'; Goater 54'	Attendance: 15,811

3 April 2004 40	Reading	2–0	West Ham United	Madejski Stadium
	Kitson 35', 52'	Report		Attendance: 23,314

10 April 2004 41	Bradford City	2–1	Reading	Bradford & Bingley Stadium
	Wetherall 12'; Emanuel 53'	Report	Kitson 25'	Attendance: 10,287

12 April 2004 42	Reading	0–1	Norwich City	Madejski Stadium
		Report	Mulryne 86'	Attendance: 18,460

17 April 2004 43	Reading	1–1	Crewe Alexandra	Madejski Stadium
	Kitson 10'	Report	Lunt 39'	Attendance: 14,729

24 April 2004 44	Millwall	0–1	Reading	The Den
		Report	Goater 16'	Attendance: 12,535

1 May 2004 45	Reading	1–0	West Bromwich Albion	Madejski Stadium
	Sidwell 88'	Report		Attendance: 20,619

9 May 2004 46	Watford	1–0	Reading	Vicarage Road
	Young 44'	Report		Attendance: 17,979

==== League table ====
Pos	Team	Pld	W	D	L	GF	GA	GD	Pts	Promotion, qualification or relegation
7	Wigan Athletic	46	18	17	11	60	45	+15	71	
8	Sheffield United	46	20	11	15	65	56	+9	71	
9	Reading	46	20	10	16	55	57	−2	70	
10	Millwall	46	18	15	13	55	48	+7	69	Qualification for the UEFA Cup first round (Note: Since the FA Cup winners Manchester United qualified for the Champions League, their place in the UEFA Cup went to Millwall, who were the FA Cup runners-up.)
11	Stoke City	46	18	12	16	58	55	+3	66	

Source: Soccerway
Rules for classification: 1) points; 2) goal difference; 3) number of goals scored.

=== League Cup ===
13 August 2003 First Round	Boston United	1–3	Reading	Boston
19:45 BST (UTC+1)	Redfearn 69' (pen.)	Report	Forster 16', 87'; Sidwell 83'	Stadium: York Street; Attendance: 2,055; Referee: A.Butler

24 September 2003 Second Round	Oxford United	1–3	Reading	Oxford
19:45 BST (UTC+1)	Louis 78'	Report	Salako 52'; Forster 66'; Harper 89'	Stadium: Kassam Stadium; Attendance: 9,870; Referee: B.Curson

28 October 2003 Third Round	Reading	1–0	Huddersfield Town	Reading
20:00 GMT (UTC)	Forster 82'	Report		Stadium: Madejski Stadium; Attendance: 11,892; Referee: Dermot Gallagher

3 December 2003 Fourth Round	Reading	0–1	Chelsea	Reading
20:00 GMT (UTC)		Report	Hasselbaink 57'	Stadium: Madejski Stadium; Attendance: 24,107; Referee: Steve Bennett

=== FA Cup ===
3 January 2004 Third Round	Preston North End	3–3	Reading	Preston
15:00 GMT (UTC)	O'Neil 9'; Fuller 32', 45'	Report	Goater 7'; Jackson 13' (o.g.); Davis 37' (og.)	Stadium: Deepdale; Attendance: 9,428; Referee: E.Ilderton

13 January 2004 Third Round Reply	Reading	1–2	Preston North End	Reading
20:00 GMT (UTC)	Goater 84'	Report	Cresswell 28'; Koumantarakis 47'	Stadium: Madejski Stadium; Attendance: 9,314; Referee: E.Ilderton

== Squad statistics ==
As of match played 9 May 2004

=== Appearances and goals ===
No.	Pos	Nat	Player	Total		First Division		FA Cup		League Cup	
No.	Pos	Nat	Player	Apps	Goals	Apps	Goals	Apps	Goals	Apps	Goals
1	GK	(United States) USA	Marcus Hahnemann	42	0	36	0	2	0	4	0
2	DF	(Scotland) SCO	Graeme Murty	42	0	37+1	0	2	0	2	0
3	DF	(England) ENG	Nicky Shorey	41	2	35	2	2	0	4	0
4	MF	(England) ENG	Kevin Watson	25	0	10+12	0	0+1	0	2	0
5	DF	(England) ENG	Steve Brown	22	0	19	0	1	0	2	0
6	DF	(England) ENG	Dean Gordon	3	0	0+3	0	0	0	0	0
8	DF	(Wales) WAL	Ady Williams	38	1	33	1	2	0	3	0
9	FW	(Bermuda) BER	Shaun Goater	38	14	30+4	12	2	2	1+1	0
10	FW	(England) ENG	Nicky Forster	34	12	28+2	8	0	0	4	4
11	MF	(England) ENG	Andy Hughes	48	3	42+1	3	1	0	4	0
12	FW	(England) ENG	Dave Kitson	17	5	10+7	5	0	0	0	0
14	MF	(England) ENG	Steve Sidwell	48	9	43	8	1+1	0	3	1
15	MF	(England) ENG	James Harper	43	1	35+4	1	2	0	2	0
16	DF	(Iceland) ISL	Ívar Ingimarsson	28	1	24+1	1	1	0	2	0
17	MF	(England) ENG	John Salako	43	4	32+5	3	0+2	0	3+1	1
20	FW	(England) ENG	Bas Savage	17	0	6+9	0	1	0	1	0
21	GK	(England) ENG	Jamie Ashdown	10	0	10	0	0	0	0	0
23	FW	(England) ENG	Dean Morgan	15	1	3+10	1	1+1	0	0	0
25	MF	(England) ENG	Ricky Newman	35	0	25+5	0	2	0	3	0
26	GK	(England) ENG	Jamie Young	1	0	0+1	0	0	0	0	0
30	MF	(Jamaica) JAM	Omar Daley	7	0	0+6	0	0	0	0+1	0
31	FW	(England) ENG	Lloyd Owusu	16	4	11+5	4	0	0	0	0
Players who appeared for Reading but left during the season:
6	DF	(England) ENG	John Mackie	10	1	7+2	1	0	0	1	0
7	MF	(Scotland) SCO	Scott Murray	40	5	25+9	5	2	0	3+1	0
16	FW	(England) ENG	Martin Butler	3	0	0+3	0	0	0	0	0
22	FW	(England) ENG	Nathan Tyson	9	0	0+8	0	0	0	0+1	0
24	FW	(England) ENG	Darius Henderson	1	0	0+1	0	0	0	0	0
24	MF	(England) ENG	Paul Brooker	11	0	5+6	0	0	0	0	0

=== Goal scorers ===
Place	Position	Nation	Number	Name	First Division	FA Cup	League Cup	Total
1	FW	(Bermuda)	9	Shaun Goater	12	2	0	14
2	FW	(England)	10	Nicky Forster	7	0	4	11
3	MF	(England)	14	Steve Sidwell	8	0	1	9
4	FW	(England)	12	Dave Kitson	5	0	0	5
4	DF	(Scotland)	7	Scott Murray	5	0	0	5
6	FW	(England)	31	Lloyd Owusu	4	0	0	4
6	MF	(England)	17	John Salako	3	0	1	4
8	MF	(England)	11	Andy Hughes	3	0	0	3
9	DF	(England)	3	Nicky Shorey	2	0	0	2
9	MF	(England)	15	James Harper	1	0	1	2
11	FW	(England)	23	Dean Morgan	1	0	0	1
11	DF	(Wales)	8	Ady Williams	1	0	0	1
11	FW	(England)	6	John Mackie	1	0	0	1
11	DF	(Iceland)	16	Ivar Ingimarsson	1	0	0	1
				TOTALS	55	2	7	64

=== Clean sheets ===
Place	Position	Nation	Number	Name	First Division	FA Cup	League Cup	Total
1	GK	(United States)	1	Marcus Hahnemann	0	0	1	1
TOTALS					0	0	1	1

=== Disciplinary record ===
Number	Nation	Position	Name	First Division		FA Cup		League Cup		Total	
Number	Nation	Position	Name	Yellow card	Red card	Yellow card	Red card	Yellow card	Red card	Yellow card	Red card
2	(Scotland)	DF	Graeme Murty	1	0	0	0	0	0	1	0
3	(England)	DF	Nicky Shorey	0	1	0	0	0	0	0	1
4	(England)	MF	Kevin Watson	0	0	0	0	0	0	1	0
5	(England)	DF	Steve Brown	5	0	0	0	0	0	5	0
7	(Scotland)	MF	Scott Murray	4	0	0	0	0	0	4	0
8	(Wales)	DF	Ady Williams	5	0	0	0	0	0	6	0
9	(Bermuda)	FW	Shaun Goater	1	0	0	0	0	0	1	0
10	(England)	FW	Nicky Forster	2	0	0	0	0	0	2	0
11	(England)	MF	Andy Hughes	4	0	0	0	0	0	4	0
12	(England)	FW	Dave Kitson	1	0	0	0	0	0	1	0
14	(England)	MF	Steve Sidwell	9	1	0	0	0	0	9	1
15	(England)	MF	James Harper	1	0	0	0	0	0	1	0
16	(Iceland)	DF	Ivar Ingimarsson	1	1	0	0	0	0	1	1
20	(England)	FW	Bas Savage	2	0	0	0	0	0	2	0
25	(England)	MF	Ricky Newman	7	0	0	0	0	0	8	0
31	(England)	FW	Lloyd Owusu	1	1	0	0	0	0	1	1
Players who left Reading during the season:
6	(England)	DF	John Mackie	1	0	0	0	0	0	1	0
			TOTALS	45	4	0	0	0	0	49	4
