= Alex Haddow =

English footballer (born 1982)

Personal information
- Full name: Alexander Haddow
- Date of birth: 8 January 1982 (age 44)
- Place of birth: Fleet, England
- Height: 5 ft 8 in (1.73 m)
- Positions: Full-back; midfielder

Youth career
- 1998–1999: Reading

Senior career*
Years	Team	Apps	(Gls)
1999–2001	Reading	3	(0)
2001–2002	Carlisle United	4	(0)
2002–2003	Hartley Wintney	?	(?)
2003	Aldershot Town	0	(0)
2003–2005	Slough Town	57	(12)
2005	Eastleigh	?	(?)
2005	→ Salisbury City (loan)	?	(?)
2005–2007	Salisbury City	?	(?)
2007	Hampton & Richmond	?	(?)
2007–2008	Bognor Regis Town	?	(?)
2008–2010	Horsham	?	(?)
- * Club domestic league appearances and goals

Alex Haddow (born 8 January 1982) is an English footballer who plays as a left sided defender or midfielder. He played in the Football League for Reading and Carlisle United before moving into non-league football following a serious knee injury.

== Club career ==
Born in Fleet, Haddow began his career in the Academy at Reading. He made his debut on 24 August 1999 against Peterborough United in the League Cup, making a total of three appearances during the 1999–2000 season. He joined Barnet on a one-month loan in July 2000 but did not make any appearances and returned to Reading, though he featured in just one game over the course of the season, a 4–0 win at home to Brentford. He was released by Reading in May 2001 and joined Carlisle United three months later. After five appearances for the club he damaged his cruciate ligament and was ruled out for the rest of the season. He left Carlisle at the end of the season and trialled with Canadian side Vancouver Whitecaps before moving into non-league football.

After short spells at Hartley Wintney and Aldershot Town he joined Isthmian League side Slough Town in August 2003. In two years with club Haddow accumulated 72 appearances in all competitions, scoring twice. He also won the FA Cup Player of the Round award for his performance in Slough's 2–1 first-round win over Walsall in November 2004. In February 2005 he joined divisional rivals Eastleigh on a two-year contract though he did not remain at the club long, joining Salisbury City on loan in September before making the move permanent two months later. He remained with the side until the end of the 2006–07 season, scoring nine goals in more than 70 appearances, but was not offered a new contract upon Salisbury's promotion to the Conference Premier.

He briefly turned out for Hampton & Richmond Borough before joining Bognor Regis Town in late 2007. He remained with the club until the end of the season before financial problems at Bognor saw him move to Horsham where he played until 2010.

== International career ==
Haddow was called up to the England futsal squad in 2005 and went on to make a number of appearances for the side.

== Career statistics (partial) ==
As of match played 12 February 2005.

Club	Season	League			FA Cup		League Cup		Other		Total	
Club	Season	Division	Apps	Goals	Apps	Goals	Apps	Goals	Apps	Goals	Apps	Goals
Reading	1999–2000	Second Division	2	0	0	0	1	0	0	0	3	0
Reading	2000–01	Second Division	1	0	0	0	0	0	0	0	1	0
Reading	Total		3	0	0	0	1	0	0	0	4	0
Carlisle United	2001–02	Third Division	4	0	0	0	1	0	0	0	5	0
Slough Town	2003–04	Isthmian League	37	7	1	0	—	—	2 (Note: 1 appearance in the Berks & Bucks Senior Cup, 1 appearance in the FA Trophy)	0	40	7
Slough Town	2004–05	Isthmian League	20	5	5	2	—	—	7 (Note: 4 appearances in the FA Trophy, 2 appearances in the Isthmian League Cup, 1 appearance in the Berks & Bucks Senior Cup)	0	32	7
Slough Town	Total		57	12	6	2	0	0	9	0	72	14
Career total			64	12	6	2	2	0	9	0	81	14

== After football ==
Haddow now works as a rehabilitation specialist and part-time university lecturer.
