= Darius Henderson =

English footballer (born 1981)

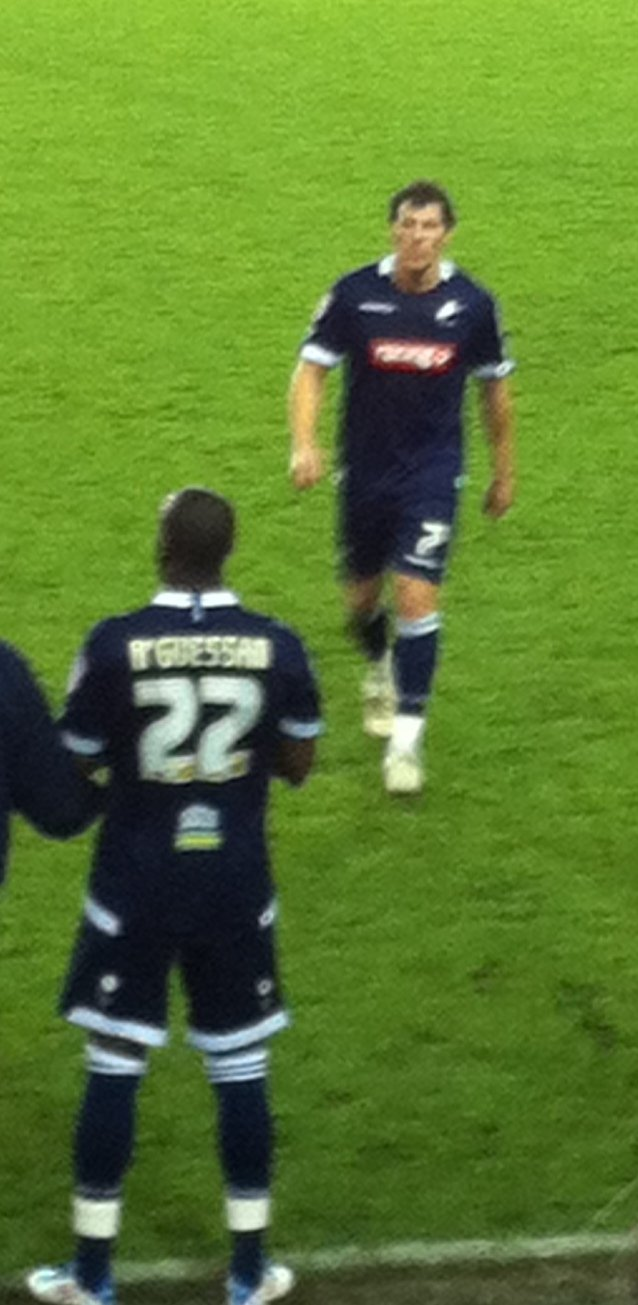
- Henderson playing for Millwall in 2011

Personal information
- Full name: Darius Alexis Henderson
- Date of birth: 7 September 1981 (age 45)
- Place of birth: Sutton, England
- Height: 6 ft 0 in (1.83 m)
- Position: Striker

Youth career
- Doncaster Rovers
- –1999: Reading

Senior career*
Years	Team	Apps	(Gls)
1999–2004	Reading	71	(11)
2003	→ Brighton & Hove Albion (loan)	10	(2)
2004–2005	Gillingham	36	(9)
2004	→ Swindon Town (loan)	6	(5)
2005–2008	Watford	105	(29)
2008–2011	Sheffield United	72	(20)
2011–2013	Millwall	51	(22)
2013–2014	Nottingham Forest	45	(10)
2014–2015	Leyton Orient	23	(8)
2015–2016	Scunthorpe United	13	(0)
2016	Coventry City	5	(0)
2016–2017	Mansfield Town	13	(1)
2017	Eastleigh	2	(0)
Total		453	(117)
- * Club domestic league appearances and goals

Darius Alexis Henderson (born 7 September 1981) is an English former professional footballer who played as a striker.

Born in Sutton, England, (although he is often mistakenly cited as being born in Doncaster, where he moved at a young age and attended school in the city), Henderson started his football career as a junior with Doncaster Rovers before signing professionally for Reading. Having spent four years at Reading he then moved initially to Gillingham before being signed by Watford with whom he achieved promotion from the Championship and played in the Premier League during the 2006–07 season. Leaving Watford, he then had spells at Sheffield United and Millwall before signing for Forest. Henderson has also played on loan for both Brighton & Hove Albion and Swindon Town during his career.

His record transfer fee was the £2,000,000 that Sheffield United paid for him in 2008. He scored 20 goals in 72 appearances for the Sheffield club.

== Club career ==
=== Reading ===
Henderson started his career at Reading, making his debut as a substitute in March 2000, in a 3–0 loss to Burnley. After a further two substitute appearances he made his first start, in a 2–1 victory over Wycombe Wanderers in April, although he was substituted at half-time. He made a further two appearances that season.

Despite his spell in the team towards the end of that season, he was limited to six appearances in the 2000–01 campaign. However, he became a regular in the Reading team in Division Two. His first League goals came in a 4–0 win over Luton Town, in which he scored twice. He made a further 24 appearances for Reading in the 2002–03 season, mostly in the latter part of the campaign, scoring four goals, but was loaned out to Brighton & Hove Albion for the start of the 2003–04 season for whom he scored two goals in ten games in a two-month spell. He made what was to be his final appearance for Reading in November 2003, before being sold to Gillingham for a nominal fee in January 2004. He had scored 11 goals in 71 games for Reading.

=== Gillingham ===
Unfortunately for Henderson, he was injured just a month after joining Gillingham, and did not play for the remainder of the 2003–04 season. Early in the 2004–05 season, he was loaned to League One team Swindon Town, for whom he scored an impressive five goals in six appearances. Returning to Priestfield, Gillingham were already struggling in the lower reaches of the Championship. Henderson became a regular in the team's struggle for survival, scoring 11 goals.

=== Watford ===
With the 2005–06 season due to start, he became part of Adrian Boothroyd's reshaped Watford team, joining for a fee of £450,000. Signed the day before the first game of the season, he made his début and scored in the 2–1 loss to Preston North End which opened the season. Henderson went on to be an integral part of Watford's successful season in the Championship, scoring 14 goals – nine of which were headers – in 27 games as they finished third, including a splendid half-volley in the local derby away at Luton Town. He also scored a penalty in Watford's 3–0 win against Leeds United in the Championship play-off final, as Watford were promoted to the Premier League. A passionate player, Henderson amassed six yellow cards and one red in the 2005–06 season.

While in the Premiership, it was not until 10 February 2007, that he scored his first goal of the season, against West Ham United at The Boleyn Ground in a 1–0. He soon notched his second, hooking in from close range against Wigan Athletic. His final goal of the season came away at Tottenham.

In the 2007–08 season, with Watford back in the Championship, Henderson scored thirteen league goals, including five in September. Two of these came in the last 10 minutes against Southampton, as, after coming on as a substitute, Henderson led Watford to victory. Henderson was named as the Championship Player of the Month for September. Henderson continued his good form until Christmas. Only three goals, however, came after the turn of the year. After being suspended for the first leg of the club's play-off semi-final against Hull City, Henderson returned to score the first goal in the second leg at the KC Stadium. However, Watford went on to lose the game 4–1, and 6–1 on aggregate. Henderson had been a highly popular player, and came third in the Player of the Season competition.

=== Sheffield United ===
In July 2008, Henderson signed a 4-year contract with Sheffield United after a fee of £2 million was agreed, with the possibility of further payments depending on appearances. He made his debut for the Blades in a 1–0 away defeat on the opening day of the season against Birmingham City. He scored his first goal in Blades colours at the end of August, away at Huddersfield Town in the second round of the League Cup. Although a regular starter he missed a number of matches through injury and suspension, scoring only 6 more goals in the 2008–09 season.

The following season, he was again favoured as the Blades main striker and netted twelve times before once again being hit with an injury that would eventually keep him out for almost twelve months. Henderson returned to the Blades first team in March 2011 but was red carded during his first game back, and made only eight appearances that season, scoring two goals, as the Blades slipped to relegation.

=== Millwall ===
With the Blades struggling to maintain their wage bill following their relegation to League One they agreed to sell Henderson to Championship team Millwall at the end of June 2011 for an undisclosed fee.

On 22 October 2011, Henderson scored a hat-trick against Leicester City. The game ended 3–0 to Millwall and earned the team valuable points to steer them out of the relegation zone. Henderson scored his second and third hat-tricks for Millwall within a week, in a 5–0 FA Cup win over Dagenham & Redbridge and a 3–1 away win at Barnsley. He followed this up, scoring the equalizer against Southampton in an FA Cup fourth round tie. This goal took his tally for his season to 16, from 22 matches. It was also his 100th professional goal. During the close-season, Henderson was reportedly being chased by several Championship rivals but Kenny Jackett was keen to keep him.

=== Nottingham Forest ===
Henderson joined Nottingham Forest in January 2013, agreeing a short-term deal to run until the end of the season, after Millwall agreed to allow him to leave on a free transfer to help cut their wage bill. In June 2013, Henderson agreed a further two-year deal with Forest, with an option of a third year.

=== Final playing years ===
On 1 August 2014, Henderson signed a three-year contract with Leyton Orient. On 24 July 2015, Henderson joined Scunthorpe United.

On 5 February 2016, Henderson signed for Coventry City, before going on to join Mansfield Town in August. He scored his first goal for Mansfield in a 3–1 win against Notts County on 8 October 2016.

Henderson signed for National League team Eastleigh in January 2017, leaving them by mutual in April after two appearances for the club. Following his retirement, Henderson confirmed that by the end of his playing career he could not head the ball properly, due to the deterioration of the cartilage in his neck.

== Post-playing career and personal life ==
Since retiring from playing, Henderson has become an agent and mentor with a football agency. He has five children. Henderson took up mountaineering in early 2019 and hopes to become the first footballer to summit Mount Everest, with an attempt set for May 2024. He has reached the summits of Gran Paradiso, Mont Blanc and Aconcagua.

On 1 January 2012, while still a professional footballer, Henderson was arrested on suspicion of causing GBH. He was alleged to have punched a customer in a restaurant where he and his girlfriend were eating, after the customer had tried to intervene in an argument between Henderson and another woman. He was found not guilty after a jury trial at St Albans Crown Court in February 2014.

== Career statistics ==
As of 29 March 2016

Appearances and goals by club, season and competition
Club	Season	League			National Cup		League Cup		Other		Total	
Club	Season	Division	Apps	Goals	Apps	Goals	Apps	Goals	Apps	Goals	Apps	Goals
Reading	1999–2000	Division Two	6	0	0	0	0	0	0	0	6	0
Reading	2000–01	Division Two	4	0	0	0	1	0	1 (Note: Appearances in Football League Trophy)	0	6	0
Reading	2001–02	Division Two	38	7	2	0	3	2	2	2	45	11
Reading	2002–03	Division One	22	4	1	0	0	0	2 (Note: Appearances in 2003 Football League play-offs)	0	25	4
Reading	2003–04	Division One	1	0	0	0	0	0	0	0	1	0
Reading	Total		71	11	3	0	4	2	5	2	83	15
Brighton & Hove Albion (loan)	2003–04	Division Two	10	2	0	0	0	0	0	0	10	2
Gillingham	2003–04	Division One	4	0	2	1	0	0	0	0	6	1
Gillingham	2004–05	Championship	32	9	1	0	0	0	0	0	33	9
Gillingham	Total		36	9	3	1	0	0	0	0	39	10
Swindon Town (loan)	2004–05	League One	6	5	0	0	0	0	0	0	6	5
Watford	2005–06	Championship	30	14	1	0	1	0	2 (Note: Appearances in 2006 Football League play-offs)	1	34	15
Watford	2006–07	Premier League	35	3	4	0	2	0	0	0	41	3
Watford	2007–08	Championship	40	12	1	0	0	0	1 (Note: Appearances in 2008 Football League play-offs)	1	42	13
Watford	Total		105	29	6	0	3	0	3	2	117	31
Sheffield United	2008–09	Championship	32	6	2	0	2	1	1 (Note: Appearances in 2009 Football League play-offs)	0	37	7
Sheffield United	2009–10	Championship	32	12	2	0	1	0	0	0	35	12
Sheffield United	2010–11	Championship	8	2	0	0	0	0	0	0	8	2
Sheffield United	Total		72	20	4	0	3	1	1	0	80	21
Millwall	2011–12	Championship	31	15	3	4	0	0	0	0	34	19
Millwall	2012–13	Championship	20	7	1	0	1	0	0	0	22	7
Millwall	Total		51	22	4	4	1	0	0	0	56	26
Nottingham Forest	2012–13	Championship	11	2	0	0	0	0	0	0	11	2
Nottingham Forest	2013–14	Championship	34	8	3	1	1	0	0	0	38	9
Nottingham Forest	Total		45	10	3	1	1	0	0	0	49	11
Leyton Orient	2014–15	League One	23	8	0	0	1	0	1	0	25	8
Scunthorpe United	2015–16	League One	13	0	2	0	1	0	0	0	16	0
Coventry City	2015–16	League One	5	0	0	0	0	0	0	0	5	0
Career total			437	116	25	6	14	3	10	4	486	129

== Honours ==
Watford

- Football League Championship play-offs: 2006
