= Matthew Robinson (footballer, born 1974) =

English footballer

Personal information
- Full name: Matthew Richard Robinson
- Date of birth: 23 December 1974 (age 51)
- Place of birth: Exeter, England
- Height: 5 ft 11 in (1.80 m)
- Position: Full back

Youth career
- Dorset Schools
- Southampton

Senior career*
Years	Team	Apps	(Gls)
1993–1998	Southampton	14	(0)
1998–2000	Portsmouth	69	(1)
2000–2002	Reading	65	(0)
2002–2006	Oxford United	171	(4)
2006–2007	Forest Green Rovers	30	(1)
2007–2009	Salisbury City	56	(1)
2009–2010	AFC Totton	?	(?)
2010–2012	Swindon Supermarine	61	(3)

Managerial career
- 2011: Swindon Supermarine
- * Club domestic league appearances and goals

Matthew Richard Robinson (born 23 December 1974) is an English football manager and former professional footballer.

As a player, he was a full back who notably played in the Premier League for Southampton, before switching to rivals Portsmouth. He later played in the Football League for Reading and Oxford United before moving into non-league football with Forest Green Rovers and Totton.

He later had a spell as player/manager of Swindon Supermarine, before later joining Chippenham Town as a coach.

== Playing career ==
Having represented Dorset Schools, Robinson joined Southampton as a trainee in July 1991, signing as a professional in 1993. His career at Southampton suffered from the rapid turnover of managers and in little over four years, he served under five different managers. He only made 14 appearances (of which 11 were from the bench) for Southampton before joining Portsmouth for £50,000 in February 1998.

At Portsmouth, he was Alan Ball's second signing as manager and he went straight into the side at left-back. His career also suffered from frequent managerial changes, but in his two years at Fratton Park, Robinson chalked up more than 75 games, including 69 league appearances and scoring one goal, before moving to Reading in a £150,000 deal in January 2000.

Robinson played another 75 league and cup games for Reading before he headed to Oxford United in July 2002 on a free transfer. A regular for Oxford, Robinson amassed 192 games in just over four years.

Another free transfer took him to Forest Green Rovers in September 2006 where he made thirty Conference appearances. In May 2007, he joined Salisbury City on a part-time basis and was in training to be a police officer. After a successful period with Salisbury, Robinson left the club and signed for A.F.C. Totton in February 2009.

In 2010, Robinson joined Southern League side Swindon Supermarine as player-manager. The 2011–12 season was a hard season for Swindon Supermarine finishing third from bottom under the management of Matt Robinson and Gary Horgan. With the appointment of Highworth manager Dave Webb and assistant Lee Spalding the club hoped Robinson would still play for the club and Horgan would take a coaching role. Robinson left Supermarine in April 2012.

== Personal life ==
Robinson is now a police officer.

In November 2021, Robinson spoke candidly about how it was difficult to be accepted by Portsmouth fans following his transfer from Southampton.

== Career statistics ==
Appearances and goals by club, season and competition
Club	Season	League			FA Cup		League Cup		Other		Total	
Club	Season	Division	Apps	Goals	Apps	Goals	Apps	Goals	Apps	Goals	Apps	Goals
Southampton
Southampton	1994–95	Premier League	1	0	0	0	0	0	—		1	0
Southampton	1995–96	Premier League	5	0	2	0	0	0	—		7	0
Southampton	1996–97	Premier League	7	0	1	0	0	0	—		8	0
Southampton	1997–98	Premier League	1	0	0	0	0	0	—		1	0
Southampton	Total		14	0	3	0	0	0	0	0	17	0
Portsmouth
Portsmouth	1997–98	First Division	15	0	0	0	0	0	—		15	0
Portsmouth	1998–99	First Division	29	1	2	0	1	0	—		32	1
Portsmouth	1999–2000	First Division	25	0	1	0	4	0	—		30	0
Portsmouth	Total		69	1	3	0	5	0	0	0	77	1
Reading
Reading	1999–2000	Second Division	19	0	0	0	0	0	1 (Note: Appearances in Football League Trophy)	0	20	0
Reading	2000–01	Second Division	32	0	2	0	2	0	3 (Note: Appearances in 2001 play-offs)	0	39	0
Reading	2001–02	Second Division	14	0	0	0	2	0	—		16	0
Reading	Total		65	0	2	0	4	0	4	0	75	0
Oxford United
Oxford United	2002–03	Third Division	42	1	3	0	3	0	1	0	49	1
Oxford United	2003–04	Third Division	40	1	0	0	2	0	1	0	43	1
Oxford United	2004–05	League Two	45	2	1	0	1	0	1	0	48	2
Oxford United	2005–06	League Two	44	0	4	0	1	0	3	0	52	0
Oxford United	Total		171	4	8	0	7	0	6	0	192	4
Forest Green Rovers	2006–07	Conference National	30	1	0	0	—		—		30	1
Salisbury City
Salisbury City	2007–08	Conference Premier	43	0	0	0	—		—		43	0
Salisbury City	2008–09	Conference Premier	13	1	0	0	—		—		13	1
Salisbury City	Total		56	1	0	0	0	0	0	0	56	1
Swindon Supermarine
Swindon Supermarine	2009–10	Southern Premier	25	0	1	0	—		5 (Note: Appearances in FA Trophy (1 appearance) and Southern League Cup (4 appearances, 1 goal))	1	31	1
Swindon Supermarine	2010–11	Southern Premier	27	2	6	1	—		3 (Note: Appearances in FA Trophy)	0	36	3
Swindon Supermarine	2011–12	Southern Premier	9	1	0	0	—		4 (Note: Appearances in FA Trophy (1 appearance) and Southern League Cup (3 appearances))	0	13	1
Swindon Supermarine	Total		61	3	7	1	0	0	12	1	80	5
Career total			466	10	23	1	16	0	22	1	527	12
