= Simon Cox (footballer, born 1984) =

English footballer

Personal information
- Date of birth: 24 March 1984 (age 42)
- Place of birth: Clapham, England
- Position: Goalkeeper
- 2002–2003: Oxford United

Senior career*
Years	Team	Apps	(Gls)
2003–2005	Oxford United	8	(0)

International career
2000–2001	Republic of Ireland U16	8	(0)
2002–2003	Republic of Ireland U18	0	(0)
2004–2005	Republic of Ireland U20	0	
- * Club domestic league appearances and goals as of 09:23, 27 June 2007 (UTC)

Simon Cox (born 23 March 1984) is an English former football goalkeeper.

He attended ADT College (now Ashcroft Technology Academy) when he was a teenager.

Cox started his career with Reading F.C. and joined to Oxford United in 2002. He was released in 2005, and has since been without a club.
