= Darren Caskey =

English footballer

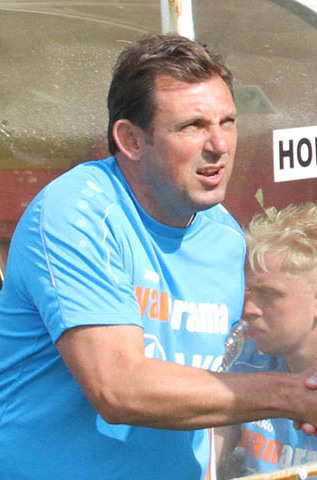
- Caskey with York City in 2017

Personal information
- Full name: Darren Mark Caskey
- Date of birth: 21 August 1974 (age 52)
- Place of birth: Basildon, England
- Height: 5 ft 8 in (1.73 m)
- Position: Midfielder

Youth career
- –1992: Tottenham Hotspur

Senior career*
Years	Team	Apps	(Gls)
1992–1996	Tottenham Hotspur	32	(4)
1995	→ Watford (loan)	6	(1)
1996–2001	Reading	201	(35)
2001–2004	Notts County	114	(10)
2004	Bristol City	0	(0)
2004	Hornchurch	15	(6)
2004–2005	Peterborough United	4	(0)
2005	Bath City	1	(0)
2005	Havant & Waterlooville	6	(0)
2005	Virginia Beach Mariners		
2006	Rushden & Diamonds	18	(1)
2006–2008	Kettering Town		
2007–2008	→ Halesowen Town (loan)		
2008–2009	Halesowen Town		
2009–2010	Ilkeston Town		
2011–2012	Ilkeston	20	(7)
2014–2015	Gateshead	0	(0)
Total		417	(64)

International career
1993	England U18	6	(1)
1992–1993	England U19	9	(0)
- * Club domestic league appearances and goals

Darren Mark Caskey (born 21 August 1974) is an English football coach and former professional footballer.

As a player, he was a midfielder who notably played in the Premier League for Tottenham Hotspur. He also played in the Football League for Watford, Reading, Notts County, Bristol City, Peterborough United and Rushden & Diamonds, in the United States with Virginia Beach Mariners and in non-league football with Hornchurch, Kettering Town, Halesowen Town, Ilkeston Town and Gateshead. He was capped at England U18 and U19 level.

Since retirement, Caskey has coached at Ilkeston Town, later taking on the role as assistant manager at Wrexham before a similar spell at York City.

== Club career ==
Caskey was born in Basildon, Essex. A central midfielder, he started his career as a trainee at Tottenham Hotspur, but failed to live up to early potential. He went on to have notable spells at Reading and Notts County, also playing for Peterborough United and Rushden & Diamonds, where he scored once against Shrewsbury Town. He ended his career as a player and assistant manager with Ilkeston Town, remaining in the same role with Ilkeston after the original club's liquidation.

== International career ==
He captained the England national under-18 team that won the 1993 UEFA European Under-18 Championship, scoring the winning penalty kick in the 1–0 victory against Turkey in the final. He was capped by the England schools team.

== Coaching career ==
Caskey combined his playing duties with the role of assistant manager for Ilkeston Town and Ilkeston under manager Kevin Wilson. In September 2013, he became assistant manager at Gateshead under Gary Mills.

Caskey followed Mills to Wrexham on 1 June 2015, after compensation was agreed between the two clubs. Caskey left the club on 26 October 2016, shortly after Mills was dismissed. Caskey had already been assisting Mills after his appointment at York City, working without a title or a contract. He eventually adopted the position of football consultant. He was dismissed alongside Mills on 30 September 2017.

== Personal life ==
His son Jake plays for Woking.

== Honours ==
Individual

- PFA Team of the Year: 1999–2000 Second Division
