= 2001–02 Carlisle United F.C. season =

Carlisle United F.C.
2001–02 season
- Chairman: Michael Knighton
- Manager: Roddy Collins (to April); Billy Barr (caretaker) (April–July)
- Stadium: Brunton Park
- Third Division: 17th
- FA Cup: Second round
- League Cup: First round
- Football League Trophy: First round

For the 2001–02 season, Carlisle United F.C. competed in Football League Division Three.

== Season summary ==
For the second season in a row, Carlisle made a poor start, only winning one of their first eleven matches. This time, however, Carlisle were given a cushion from the only relegation spot thanks to the truly dreadful form of Halifax Town, allowing new manager Roddy Collins time to experiment with the team and tactics, and find a formula that worked. From the start of December, Carlisle's form experienced a major improvement, and by March not only were the club experiencing their best season since relegation from the Second Division in 1998 and in absolutely no danger of relegation, but supporters were daring to dream of a top-half finish.

Any such dreams would ultimately be ended by the protracted takeover discussions between long-serving chairman Michael Knighton and prospective new owner John Courtenay. This led to the shock sacking of Collins after he publicly accused Knighton of undermining his position and not being serious about selling the club, and in turn resulted in Knighton's relationship with the fans, already strained at best, completely disintegrating, leading to a mass-boycott of their final six matches of the season. Caretaker manager Billy Barr could only win one of those six matches, leading to Carlisle slumping to 17th place, though this was still a much better finish than any of their previous three seasons. After the season ended, Knighton finally sold up to Courtenay, whose first decision was to reinstate Collins as manager.

== Results & fixtures ==
=== Third Division ===
==== League table ====
Pos	Team	Pld	W	D	L	GF	GA	GD	Pts
15	Darlington	46	15	11	20	60	71	−11	56
16	Exeter City	46	14	13	19	48	73	−25	55
17	Carlisle United	46	12	16	18	49	56	−7	52
18	Leyton Orient	46	13	13	20	55	71	−16	52
19	Torquay United	46	12	15	19	46	63	−17	51

Rules for classification: 1) Points; 2) Goal difference; 3) Goals scored

==== Matches ====
Match Day	Date	Opponent	H/A	Score	Carlisle United Scorer(s)	Attendance	Report
1	11 August	Luton Town	H	0–2			
2	18 August	Leyton Orient	A	0–0			
3	25 August	Hull City	H	0–0			
4	27 August	Torquay United	A	1–2			
5	1 September	Rochdale	H	1–2			
6	8 September	Darlington	A	2–2			
7	15 September	Cheltenham Town	A	0–2			
8	18 September	York City	H	2–1			
9	22 September	Lincoln City	H	2–2			
10	25 September	Southend United	A	2–3			
11	28 September	Hartlepool United	A	1–3			
12	6 October	Bristol Rovers	H	1–0			
13	13 October	Exeter City	A	0–1			
14	20 October	Kidderminster Harriers	H	1–0			
15	23 October	Oxford United	A	1–1			
16	27 October	Halifax Town	H	0–0			
17	3 November	Macclesfield Town	A	1–1			
18	10 November	Mansfield Town	H	0–1			
19	20 November	Shrewsbury Town	H	0–1			
20	24 November	Plymouth Argyle	A	0–3			
21	1 December	Scunthorpe United	H	3–0			
22	15 December	Swansea City	A	0–0			
23	22 December	Rushden & Diamonds	A	1–3			
24	12 January	Leyton Orient	H	6–1			
25	15 January	Hull City	A	1–0			
26	19 January	Luton Town	A	1–1			
27	22 January	Rushden & Diamonds	H	3–0			
28	29 January	Rochdale	A	1–1			
29	5 February	Darlington	H	1–3			
30	9 February	Kidderminster Harriers	A	2–2			
31	16 February	Exeter City	H	1–0			
32	19 February	Rochdale	H	2–0			
33	2 March	Lincoln City	A	1–3			
34	5 March	Southend United	H	0–0			
35	9 March	Swansea City	H	3–1			
36	12 March	Bristol Rovers	A	0–0			
37	16 March	Scunthorpe United	A	1–2			
38	19 March	Hartlepool United	H	0–2			
39	23 March	Oxford United	H	2–1			
40	29 March	Halifax Town	A	2–2			
41	1 April	Macclesfield Town	H	3–2			
42	6 April	Shrewsbury Town	A	0–1			
43	9 April	York City	A	0–0			
44	13 April	Plymouth Argyle	H	0–2			
45	16 April	Cheltenham Town	H	0–0			
46	20 April	Mansfield Town	A	0–2			

=== English League Cup ===
Round	Date	Opponent	H/A	Score	Carlisle United Scorer(s)	Attendance	Report
1	21 August	Stockport County	A	0–3			

=== FA Cup ===
Round	Date	Opponent	H/A	Score	Carlisle United Scorer(s)	Attendance	Report
1	17 November	Barnet	H	0–0		2,277	
1R	27 November	Barnet	H	1–0		1,470	
2	8 December	Tranmere Rovers	A	1–6			

=== Football League Trophy ===
Round	Date	Opponent	H/A	Score	Carlisle United Scorer(s)	Attendance	Report
1	16 October	Port Vale	A	1–2			
