= Jamie Ashdown =

English association football player

Personal information
- Full name: Jamie Lawrence Ashdown
- Date of birth: 30 November 1980 (age 45)
- Place of birth: Reading, England
- Height: 5 ft 10 in (1.78 m)
- Position: Goalkeeper

Youth career
- 1991–1998: Reading

Senior career*
Years	Team	Apps	(Gls)
1998–2004	Reading	13	(0)
2001	→ Gravesend & Northfleet (loan)	0	(0)
2002	→ Arsenal (loan)	0	(0)
2002	→ AFC Bournemouth (loan)	2	(0)
2003–2004	→ Rushden & Diamonds (loan)	19	(0)
2004–2012	Portsmouth	109	(0)
2006	→ Norwich City (loan)	2	(0)
2012–2014	Leeds United	0	(0)
2014	Crawley Town	9	(0)
2015	Oxford United	5	(0)
2022–2023	Ascot United	23	(0)
Total		182	(0)
- * Club domestic league appearances and goals

Jamie Lawrence Ashdown (born 30 November 1980) is an English former professional footballer who played as a goalkeeper. He spent a large part of his career at Portsmouth, for whom he made the majority of his professional appearances. He was an FA Cup finalist with Portsmouth in 2008 and 2010, and won the FA Vase with Ascot United in 2023.

== Club career ==
=== Reading ===
Born in Reading, Berkshire, Ashdown began his career at Reading when he was eight years old. Ashdown then established a reputation as an exciting prospect for the club. He signed his professional contract with Reading in February 1998.

On 12 September 2000, Ashdown made his league debut for the club, coming on as a 74th-minute substitute for Phil Whitehead, and played the rest of the game, as he kept a clean in a 5–0 win against Oldham Athletic. This turns out to be his only appearance of the 2000–01 season. Ashdown made his first appearance of the 2001–02 season against Colchester United in the Football League Trophy and helped them win 2–1. Following this, he was offered a new contract by Reading. After Whitehead suffered an injury, Ashdown started in goal once again, coming against Chesterfield on 1 December 2001, as the club lost 1–0. Following this, he signed a contract extension with Reading, keeping him until 2004. Ashdown appeared in the next two matches before the arrival of Marcus Hahnemann and the recovery of Whitehead saw him return to the substitute bench. At the end of the 2001–02 season, he made four appearances in all competitions. Following his loan spell at AFC Bournemouth came to an end, Ashdown returned as the club's second choice goalkeeper for the rest of the 2002–03 season. But he made his an appearance against Grimsby Town on 5 October 2002 and kept a clean sheet, in a 3–0 win.

The start of the 2003–04 season saw Ashdown remain as Reading's second choice goalkeeper and this lasted until he joined Rushden & Diamonds on loan. Following loan spell at Rushden & Diamonds came to an end, Ashdown made his first appearance of the 2003–04 season against Cardiff City on 16 March 2004 and helped the side win 3–2. As a result, he broke into Reading's first-team squad as a result of an injury to first-choice 'keeper Marcus Hahnemann. Ashdown kept three clean sheets out of the thirteen appearances he made for the Royals. In the summer of 2004 Ashdown declined Reading's offer of a new contract and instead signed for Premier League club Portsmouth before the start of the 2004–05 season to provide competition for Shaka Hislop, with a view to replacing the veteran on his retirement. Because he was under 23 at the time, Ashdown was subjected of a compensation as a result of him moving to the club. Eventually, the agreement was both reached for both sides.

==== Loan Spells ====
In March 2001, Ashdown was loaned out to Gravesend & Northfleet for a month. A year later, he joined Arsenal for work experience placement for the rest of the 2001–02 season. Despite not being used in the first team, Ashdown said: "I'm still learning the game, but I'm ready to take that step up if the opportunity arises. I played five games for Arsenal reserves and did work with Bob Wilson and David Seaman nearly every day. It was all about gaining experience and playing football at that level and it has been a great help to my confidence."

At the start of the 2002–03 season, Ashdown joined Bournemouth on a one-month loan. Ashdown made his debut for Bournemouth, starting the whole game, in a 1–1 draw against Oxford United on 27 August 2002. Following a 1–0 win against Macclesfield Town four days later, he suffered an injury and this resulted in him returning to his parent club.

It was announced on 13 November 2003 when Ashdown joined Rushden & Diamonds on a one-month loan deal. He made his debut for the club two days later on 15 November 2003, in a 2–1 loss against Hartlepool United. Since making his debut for Rushden & Diamonds, Ashdown quickly became the club's first choice goalkeeper and made an impression for the side, resulting in him "earning several 'Player of the month' awards". This lasted until Ashdown was recalled by his parent club in March. During his stay at Rushden & Diamonds, he kept four clean sheets out of the nineteen appearances he made.

=== Portsmouth ===
Ashdown started his first season at Portsmouth as substitute goalkeeper but gained a starting place after an injury to Hislop. On 20 November 2004, he made his debut for the club, in a 3–1 loss against Manchester City. Ashdown started in the next five matches for Portsmouth before suffering a groin injury that kept him out for a month. After the departure of Harry Redknapp as manager and alleged comments by Hislop, a new goalkeeper, Kostas Chalkias, was brought to the club and given the first-team place. After a number of poor performances by Chalkias, he returned to the starting line–up against Newcastle United on 19 March 2005, as Portsmouth drew 1–1. Ashdown was again restored to the first team and remained there for the remainder of the season. At the end of the 2004–05 season, he made nineteen appearances in all competitions.

In August 2005, Portsmouth signed another goalkeeper, Sander Westerveld, and Ashdown was in competition with him at the beginning of the 2005–06 season for a first-team place. Westerveld started the season as first-choice 'keeper. However, after a number of poor performances by Westerveld, he was dropped and Ashdown was again called on as Portsmouth's number one goalkeeper, making his first appearance of the season against Everton on 10 September 2005 and kept a clean sheet, as the club won 1–0. In the second round of the League Cup match against Gillingham, Ashdown was at fault when he made two mistakes, including scoring an own goal, in a 3–2 loss, eliminating the club from the tournament. Despite this, he remained as Portsmouth's first choice goalkeeper for the rest of the year, though his mistakes continued along the way. This lasted until Ashdown suffered an injury while warming up prior to a match against Fulham on 1 January 2006. After missing two matches, he returned to the starting line–up against Everton on 14 January 2006, as the club lost 1–0. With the return of former manager Harry Redknapp, Ashdown was dropped to second choice again after the arrival of Dean Kiely from Charlton Athletic in January 2006. At the end of the 2005–06 season, he went on to make seventeen appearances in all competitions. The 2006–07 season Ashdown faced even more competition from new high-profile signing David James. Even he returned in late 2006, Ashdown did not feature in the first team due to the presence of David James during the 2006–07 season. On 28 January 2007, he signed a contract with Portsmouth, keeping him until 2010.

The 2007–08 season saw Ashdown continuing to remain as Portsmouth's second choice goalkeeper behind James. He made his first appearance for the club in over a year against Leeds United in the second round of the League Cup and kept a clean sheet, in a 3–0 win. Ashdown, once again, kept another clean sheet, in a 1–0 win against Burnley in the third round of the League Cup. Following the injury of James, he made his first league appearances in two years, starting the whole game, in a 1–0 loss against Blackburn Rovers. Ashdown then started in the last remaining three league matches of the 2007–08 season for the club. He picked up an FA Cup winners' medal with Portsmouth in 2008, but it was subsequently stolen. The stolen medal never resurfaced and the FA reissued Ashdown with a winners' medal. Despite not playing in the FA Cup win, he made five appearances in all competitions for the 2007–08 season.

At the start of the 2008–09 season, Ashdown continuing to remain as Portsmouth's second choice goalkeeper behind James. Portsmouth played their first ever European match, against Vitória de Guimarães, which they won and thus qualified for the group stages of the UEFA Cup. His only appearance of the season came on 17 December 2008 against Heerenveen in the UEFA Cup match and kept a clean sheet, in a 3–0 win. However, a month later, he ruptured ligament in his ankle that eventually kept out for the next three months. The 2009–10 season saw Ashdown continuing to remain as Portsmouth's second choice goalkeeper behind James. On 27 October 2009, he made his first appearance of the season, in a 4–0 win against Stoke City in the last sixteen of League Cup. A month later on 22 November 2009, Ashdown made his second appearance of the season and playing against Stoke City in the league for the second time, as the club, once again, lost 1–0. On 15 March 2010, he made his third appearance of the season against Liverpool, as the club lost 4–1. Following an injury of James against Tottenham Hotspur on 27 March 2010, Ashdown started in the next two matches and kept two consecutive clean sheets against Blackburn Rovers and Wigan Athletic between 3 April 2010 and 14 April 2010, in which Portsmouth were relegated. At the end of Portsmouth's 2009–10 Premier League relegation season, he made eight appearances (playing six league games) in all competitions.

Following this, it was announced on 19 May 2010 that Ashdown was released by the club. However, before the start of the following season, he re-joined Portsmouth on a two–year contract after David James' departure to Bristol City. In the second round of the League Cup match against Crystal Palace on 24 August 2010, Ashdown helped the club progress to the next round after winning 4–3 in the penalty shootout following a 1–1 draw, in which he saved three penalties. Since returning to Portsmouth, he quickly was inserted as their first-choice goalkeeper. Ashdown's proudest moment in a Portsmouth shirt was when he broke a post-war club record for most minutes without conceding a goal (636 minutes) between February and March 2011. Ashdown helped Portsmouth finish 16th in the Championship and made 50 appearances including the League Cup and FA Cup in a season.

At the start of the 2011–12 season, Ashdown remained as Portsmouth's first choice goalkeeper, starting the first nine matches of the season. During which, he kept two consecutive clean sheets between 16 August 2011 and 20 August 2011 against Reading and Bristol City. However, Ashdown was dropped to the substitute bench in favour of Stephen Henderson. Following the departure of Henderson, he returned to the starting line–up against Brighton & Hove Albion on 11 March 2012, as the club lost 2–0. Following this, Ashdown established himself as number one for the rest of the 2011–12 season as the only goalkeeper for Portsmouth. However, the club were relegated to League One after losing to Derby County 2–1 on 21 April 2012. At the end of the 2011–12 season, he made twenty–one appearances in all competitions.

Following this, Ashdown was released along with Ricardo Rocha and Benjani after the three being told that they would not be offered new contracts because of the club's ongoing financial problems. After being released, he said it was a difficult decision to leave Portsmouth and wished the club every success in the future. Ashdown then supported the bid for the fans to buy back their club, managing to convince 10 other players to pledge their £1000 and paying his towards the fans' successful bid to take over control of Portsmouth.

==== Norwich City (loan) ====
Due to the intense competition for the goalkeeper's spot at Fratton Park, Ashdown was given the opportunity to go out on loan, Portsmouth deciding that this would help his career, and he joined Norwich City for a one-month loan.

Ashdown played the first game of a loan spell with Norwich City on 21 October 2006 in a 1–0 win against Cardiff City at Carrow Road, replacing Paul Gallacher in the starting XI. However, in a follow–up match against Stoke City, he was sent–off in the 72nd minute for a foul on Luke Chadwick, resulting a penalty and was successfully converted by Danny Higginbotham to score the opposition team's third goal of the game, as the club lost 5–0. Despite the criticism, Manager Peter Grant praised Ashdown, saying: "Jamie put both hands up and said it's the worst he's played in two years in the two games. I knew that because I know what Jamie Ashdown is all about. He has great qualities and he is going to be a massive keeper." Ashdown made two appearances for Norwich City before returning to his parent club.

=== Leeds United ===
After a trial at Middlesbrough, Ashdown chose to join Leeds United on 23 July 2012, along with Andy Gray. Upon joining the club, he was allocated the number 12 shirt for the 2012–13 season on 3 August. Having joined alongside former Portsmouth teammates Jason Pearce, David Norris and Luke Varney, Ashdown said he will face competition from newly signed goalkeeper Paddy Kenny for the first-choice goalkeeper position ahead of the 2012–13 season.

Ashdown made his debut for Leeds on 28 August in a League Cup match against Oxford United. He joined the starting line-up for Leeds' 2–1 victory against Premier League side Everton on 25 September 2012. In November 2012, Portsmouth made a loan bid to sign Ashdown for the second time, but the bid was rejected. He continued in the Cup competitions run until a defeat by Chelsea and Manchester City at the League Cup and FA Cup respectively. At the end of the 2012–13 season, Ashdown made eight appearances in all competitions.

Throughout his time at Leeds United, Ashdown found himself behind pecking order with Paddy Kenny (and eventually Jack Butland) becoming the club's first choice goalkeeper. On 16 May 2014, Ashdown was released by Leeds.

=== Crawley Town ===
After being released by Leeds United, Ashdown joined Crawley Town on a contract until the end of December 2014.

Ashdown made his debut on 16 September 2014, in a 0–0 draw against Doncaster Rovers, keeping a clean sheet. Ashdown managed to beat off competition from Brian Jensen as first-choice goalkeeper. However, he was later criticised for a slow start at the club, despite being man of the match in a 1–1 draw against Crewe on 1 November 2014. In late November he was left out of the squad in favour of Lewis Price.

After nine appearances for Crawley Town, it announced that Ashdown had left the club by mutual agreement.

=== Oxford United ===
On 3 February 2015, Ashdown signed for Oxford United until the end of the season.

He made his first-team debut, keeping a clean sheet, in a League Two match at AFC Wimbledon on 11 April 2015 that finished 0–0. Ashdown was featured in the last four remaining matches, including keeping three clean sheets for the club. At the end of the 2014–15 season, he made five appearances in all competitions. Following this, Ashdown was offered a new contract by Oxford United. However, the club withdrew the offer to him and was released after they signed Sam Slocombe instead. Following this, he announced his retirement from professional football.

== Career statistics ==
Club	Season	Division	League		FA Cup		League Cup		Other		Total	
Club	Season	Division	Apps	Goals	Apps	Goals	Apps	Goals	Apps	Goals	Apps	Goals
Reading	2000–01	Second Division	1	0	0	0	0	0	0	0	1	0
Reading	2001–02	Second Division	1	0	1	0	0	0	2 (Note: Appearance(s) in Football League Trophy)	0	4	0
Reading	2002–03	First Division	1	0	0	0	0	0	0	0	1	0
Reading	2003–04	First Division	10	0	0	0	0	0	0	0	10	0
Reading	Total		13	0	1	0	0	0	2		16	0
AFC Bournemouth (loan)	2002–03	Third Division	2	0	0	0	0	0	0	0	2	0
Rushden & Diamonds (loan)	2003–04	Second Division	19	0	0	0	0	0	0	0	19	0
Portsmouth	2004–05	Premier League	16	0	1	0	4	0	0	0	21	0
Portsmouth	2005–06	Premier League	17	0	0	0	1	0	0	0	18	0
Portsmouth	2006–07	Premier League	0	0	0	0	0	0	0	0	0	0
Portsmouth	2007–08	Premier League	3	0	0	0	2	0	0	0	5	0
Portsmouth	2008–09	Premier League	0	0	0	0	0	0	1 (Note: Appearance(s) in UEFA Cup)	0	1	0
Portsmouth	2009–10	Premier League	6	0	0	0	2	0	0	0	8	0
Portsmouth	2010–11	Championship	46	0	1	0	3	0	0	0	50	0
Portsmouth	2011–12	Championship	21	0	0	0	0	0	0	0	21	0
Portsmouth	Total		109	0	2	0	12	0	1		124	0
→ Norwich City (loan)	2006–07	Championship	2	0	0	0	0	0	0	0	2	0
Leeds United	2012–13	Championship	0	0	4	0	4	0	0	0	8	0
Leeds United	2013–14	Championship	0	0	0	0	0	0	0	0	0	0
Leeds United			0	0	4	0	4	0	0		8	0
Crawley Town	2014–15	League One	9	0	1	0	0	0	2	0	12	0
Oxford United	2014–15	League Two	5	0	0	0	0	0	0	0	5	0
Ascot United	2022–23	Combined Counties League Premier Division North	23	0	2	0	0	0	7 (Note: Appearance(s) in FA Vase)	0	32	0
Career total			182	0	10	0	16	0	12	0	220	0

== Post–playing career ==
A year later after announcing his retirement, Ashdown revealed that he went on a trial at his former club, Portsmouth after learning that John Keeley returned as the club's goalkeeper coach but was turned away and ignored by manager Paul Cook. In September 2018, Ashdown joined Ascot United as one of their new goalkeeping coaches. During the 2022–23 season, Ashdown made 32 appearances for Ascot in all competitions as the club won the Combined Counties League Premier Division North and the FA Vase.

== Personal life ==
In the summer of 2005, Ashdown married his girlfriend, Zoe. Together, they have three children.

Ashdown endorses goalkeeping gloves made by The One Glove Company, who are donating proceeds to the charity Jack's First Steps. The charity partnership first launched on 16 December 2014 with the release of the "Pulse" goalkeeper glove.

In 2013, Ashdown set up an online business, Trusted Pro Supplements, supplying and offering information to athletes about nutritional supplements that do not feature on banned substance lists and are believed not to be harmful. In a November 2020 interview with The News, Ashdown later revealed that his cafe business, which he opened in October 2019 after its success over four years, was closed down because of the COVID-19 pandemic, and he has since worked for his father's hardware store business.

== Honours ==
Portsmouth

- FA Cup: 2007–08; runner-up: 2009–10

Ascot United

- Combined Counties League Premier Division North: 2022–23
- FA Vase: 2022–23
