= Phil Whitehead =

English footballer

Personal information
- Full name: Philip Matthew Whitehead
- Date of birth: 17 December 1969 (age 56)
- Place of birth: Halifax, England
- Position: Goalkeeper

Senior career*
Years	Team	Apps	(Gls)
1988–1990	Halifax Town	42	(0)
1990–1993	Barnsley	16	(0)
1991	→ Halifax Town (loan)	9	(0)
1991–1992	→ Scunthorpe United (loan)	16	(0)
1992	→ Bradford City (loan)	6	(0)
1993–1998	Oxford United	207	(0)
1998–1999	West Bromwich Albion	26	(0)
1999–2003	Reading	94	(0)
2002	→ Tranmere Rovers (loan)	2	(0)
2003	→ York City (loan)	2	(0)
2003–2004	Tamworth	15	(0)
Total		435	(0)
- * Club domestic league appearances and goals

Philip Matthew Whitehead (born 17 December 1969) is an English former professional football goalkeeper. He is mainly remembered for his playing days with Oxford United and Reading. At Reading he made some important penalty saves, including one against AFC Bournemouth's Richard Hughes in a 2–1 win and one against Cambridge United's Tom Youngs in a 2–2 draw. He also saved a crucial Scott Minto penalty during a shootout as Reading knocked Premier League side West Ham United out of the 2001–02 League Cup.

His career ended after he suffered a major injury playing for Tamworth during an FA Cup fourth qualifying round replay, although he attempted a short-lived comeback when he made one more appearance for Tamworth in an FA Trophy replay against Aldershot Town. He served Brentford as part-time goalkeeping coach during the 2004–05 season.

== Career statistics ==
=== Club ===
Appearances and goals by club, season and competition
Club	Season	League			National Cup		League Cup		Other		Total	
Club	Season	Division	Apps	Goals	Apps	Goals	Apps	Goals	Apps	Goals	Apps	Goals
Reading	1999–2000	Second Division	11	0	2	0	0	0	0 (Note: Appearances in the Football League Trophy)	0	13	0
Reading	2000–01	Second Division	46	0	3	0	2	0	3 (Note: Three appearances in the Second Division Playoffs and zero appearances in the Football League Trophy)	0	54	0
Reading	2001–02	Second Division	33	0	1	0	3	0	0	0	37	0
Reading	2002–03	First Division	4	0	0	0	0	0	0 (Note: Appearances in the First Division Playoffs)	0	4	0
Reading	Total		94	0	6	0	5	0	3	0	108	0
Career total			94	0	6	0	5	0	3	0	108	0
