= Martin Butler (footballer, born 1974) =

English footballer

Personal information
- Full name: Martin Neil Butler
- Date of birth: 15 September 1974 (age 52)
- Place of birth: Wordsley, West Midlands, England
- Height: 5 ft 11 in (1.80 m)
- Position: Striker

Youth career
- –1993: Walsall

Senior career*
Years	Team	Apps	(Gls)
1993–1997	Walsall	74	(8)
1997–2000	Cambridge United	104	(41)
2000–2003	Reading	103	(32)
2003–2006	Rotherham United	97	(28)
2006–2008	Walsall	44	(11)
2007	→ Grimsby Town (loan)	8	(1)
2008	Grimsby Town	16	(5)
2009	Burton Albion	12	(2)
2009	Worcester City	0	(0)
Total		458	(128)
- * Club domestic league appearances and goals

Martin Neil Butler (born 15 September 1974) is an English former professional footballer who played as a striker from 1993 until 2009.

Butler played for Walsall, Cambridge United and Reading. He also had spells with Rotherham United, Grimsby Town, Burton Albion and Worcester City.

== Career ==
=== Walsall ===
Butler started his career at Walsall, where he rose through the youth ranks. He made his senior debut in the 1993–94 season.

=== Cambridge United and Reading ===
His career at Walsall faltered, and he was allowed to join Cambridge United for £22,500 in the summer of 1997. A prolific spell at the Abbey Stadium prompted Reading to pay around the £750k mark for his services in February 2000. Butler scored on his debut against Preston North End and continued his goal-scoring form – including a goal in the 2000–01 Football League Second Division play-off Final in May 2001, although Reading went on to lose the match 3–2 to Butler's former team Walsall. On 6 November 2001, Butler was stretchered off during Reading's 2–0 win over Wrexham, suffering serious damage to his ankle. He broke his ankle and fibula, and suffered ligament damage competing for a ball on the touchline after his foot stuck in the ground. He did not play again until April 2002 against Peterborough United, but his goals that season still helped Reading to get promoted to the First Division in 2nd place.

=== Rotherham United and Return to Walsall ===
After his injury, Butler could not recapture the form for Reading that he'd shown before, and after floating in and out of the first-team, he was sold to Rotherham United in a £150,000 deal in August 2003. Butler then moved back to Walsall three seasons later on a free transfer, signing a two-year deal on 1 July 2006.

=== Grimsby Town ===
In October 2007 Butler, whose contract with Walsall was due to end at the end of the 2007–08 season, signed a three-month loan deal at League Two side Grimsby Town. The move lasted until January at which point Grimsby signed him on a permanent deal. He made his debut for Grimsby on 20 October against Wycombe Wanderers. Butler's time at Grimsby was troubled due to the players concerns that his 350-mile trip from his Worcester home to Cleethorpes were affecting his performances on and off the pitch, and he notably missed training regularly due to the time it took to commute. Alan Buckley attempted to sell Butler to Hereford United on transfer deadline day, which was only two months after signing a two-year deal at Blundell Park, but the player rejected Hereford's contract offer. In an attempt to amend relations with Grimsby, Butler returned to regular training and won back his place in the side next to Danny North and helped the Mariners climb from 19th in League Two, to 10th. Despite Butler's renewed attempts to salvage his Grimsby career, he reignited his travel problems, and this eventually saw the player drop out of contention at the club. He played his last game for the club in the League Cup fixture with Blackburn Rovers and after that he was shelved by Buckley who dropped him to the reserves, which is where he remained for the rest of his time at Grimsby before he was eventually released in October 2008 by the club's new manager Mike Newell due to the aforementioned travel problems.

=== Burton Albion and Worcester City ===
In February 2009, he was announced as Roy McFarland's first signing at non-League club Burton Albion when he signed a contract until May 2009, he was released at the end of the season. Upon his release he signed for Worcester City in July 2009. It was said that Butler would be heading towards management, but he chose to retire shortly after departing Worcester and has since not returned to the game in any capacity.

== Personal life ==
Welsh cricketer Luke Michael Butler wears the number 9 shirt for his club as a tribute to Martin. Martin works as a heating engineer and runs his own business called MK Installations.

== Honours ==
Walsall

- Football League Third Division second-place promotion: 1994–95
- Football League Two: 2006–07

Cambridge United

- Football League Third Division second-place promotion: 1998–99

Reading

- Football League Second Division second-place promotion: 2001–02

Burton Albion

- Conference National: 2008–09

Individual

- PFA Team of the Year: 1998–99 Third Division 2000–01 Second Division
