= Sammy Igoe =

English footballer (born 1975)

Personal information
- Full name: Samuel Gary Igoe
- Date of birth: 30 September 1975 (age 51)
- Place of birth: Staines-upon-Thames, England
- Position: Midfielder

Senior career*
| Years | Team | Apps | (Gls) |
| 1994–2000 | Portsmouth | 160 | (11) |
| 2000–2003 | Reading | 87 | (7) |
| 2003 | → Luton Town (loan) | 2 | (0) |
| 2003–2005 | Swindon Town | 79 | (9) |
| 2005–2006 | Millwall | 5 | (0) |
| 2006 | → Bristol Rovers (loan) | 11 | (1) |
| 2006–2008 | Bristol Rovers | 61 | (1) |
| 2008 | → Hereford United (loan) | 4 | (0) |
| 2008–2010 | AFC Bournemouth | 49 | (3) |
| 2010–2012 | Havant & Waterlooville | 65 | (5) |
| 2012–2014 | Gosport Borough | 53 | (2) |
| 2014 | → Bognor Regis Town (loan) | | |
| Total | | 576 | (39) |
- * Club domestic league appearances and goals

Samuel Gary Igoe (born 30 September 1975) is an English former professional footballer who played as a midfielder during his career. He represented the England national beach soccer team.

== Career ==
He started his career with Portsmouth, and after spells with Reading, Luton Town and Swindon Town. Igoe signed for Millwall in August 2005 but he struggled to maintain a first team place after Steve Claridge was sacked as manager.

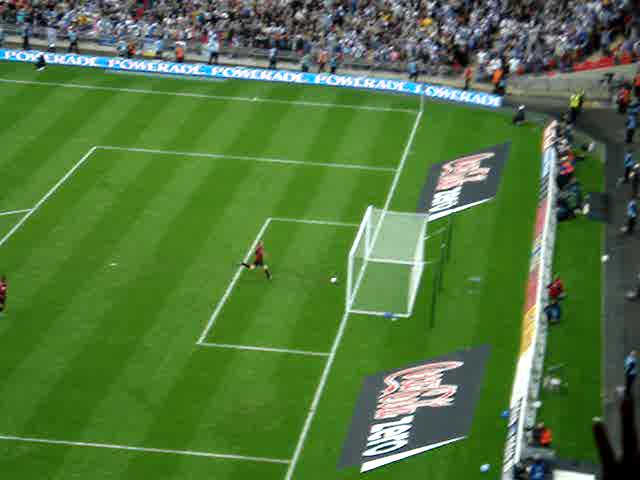
Sammy Igoe rolls in Bristol Rovers' third goal to seal their promotion to League One (Igoe not pictured).

Igoe impressed Bristol Rovers manager Paul Trollope during a loan spell at the club at the end of the 2005–06 season, and in the summer of 2006 he signed for the club on a permanent basis.

The next season, he became a regular in midfield. The highlight of the season came right at the end, he scored the last goal in the play-off final, in the 3–1 win against Shrewsbury Town at Wembley Stadium, on 26 May, running 60 yards to score it into an empty net, after the Shrewsbury goalkeeper had gone to the other goal to try to score an equaliser.

Igoe was given a loan spell at Hereford United, joining on 27 March 2008. When he returned from his loan spell at the end of the 2007–08 season he was released from his contract with Bristol Rovers, along with Chris Carruthers.

Igoe then signed a one-year contract with AFC Bournemouth after impressing whilst on trial.

On 10 May 2010, Igoe was released from Bournemouth having not being offered a new contract. On 30 June, he signed a one-year contract with Havant & Waterlooville with an option for another year.

In July 2012, having made 65 appearances for Havant & Waterlooville and scored 5 goals, Igoe signed for newly promoted Southern League Premier Division side Gosport Borough.

On 27 March 2014, it was announced that Igoe had joined Isthmian League Premier Division side Bognor Regis Town on loan.

== International career ==
Igoe was a part of the England beach soccer team that finished in third-place at the inaugural 1995 Beach Soccer World Championships.

== Honours ==
Bristol Rovers

- Football League Two play-offs: 2007
- Football League Trophy runner-up: 2006–07

Gosport Borough

- Southern League Premier Division play-offs: 2013
